= Expresso da Vitória =

Invocation https://en.wikipedia.org/wiki/Expresso_da_Vit%C3%B3ria#catlinksin Football

The Expresso da Vitória (English: Victory Express) is known as one of the best association football squads in the history of CR Vasco da Gama; it played between 1944 and 1953. The name would have appeared in a musical show of Rádio Nacional, where a singer, when performing, said that he would dedicate the music to Vasco, called by him "Expresso da Vitória", for running over his opponents on the pitch.

This generation of players, was mainly commanded by the Uruguayan coach Ondino Viera and was one of the first Brazilian team to use the 4–2–4 tactical scheme, which strongly influenced Brazilian and Uruguayan football in the 50s. The Vasco squad was also the first Brazilian team (either club or national team) to win an international title outside Brazil, the South American Championship of Champions in 1948. In all, there were eighteen titles in ten years, of which five Campeonato Carioca (three undefeatedly). It formed the basis of the Rio de Janeiro state team that won the Campeonato Brasileiro de Seleções Estaduais in 1946 and 1950, and of the Brazil national team, champion of the Copa Rio Branco in 1947 and 1950 and the Copa América in 1949, in addition to taking Brazil for the first time in history to a final of the 1950 FIFA World Cup, with eight Vasco players more the coach, Flávio Costa.

== History ==
=== Beginning ===
In 1942, the club lived an uncomfortable five-year fast without any title within the city of Rio de Janeiro. Trying to reverse this situation, the Vasco's president Cyro Aranha adopted a long-term policy, based on hiring young players. That's how goalkeeper Moacir Barbosa, striker Ademir de Menezes, midfielders Jair, Lelé, Isaías, Ely and Djalma and winger Chico arrived. The coach was the Uruguayan Ondino Viera.

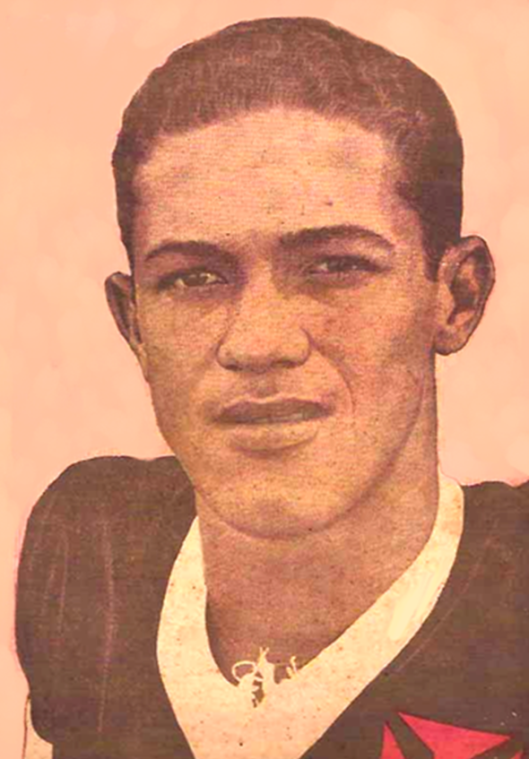
The striker Ademir de Menezes, main player of the Expresso da Vitória, which scored more than 300 goals for Vasco da Gama.

The first title came in 1944, with the victory in the Torneio Relâmpago of the Rio de Janeiro state. Later in the same season, the cast would go on to win the Torneio Início and the Torneio Municipal. In 1945, the team won the Campeonato Carioca, in addition to the Torneio Início and Torneio Municipal again.

In 1946, Vasco lost its main striker: Ademir de Menezes, who went to Fluminense. In addition to him, Uruguayan Ondino Viera left and coach Ernesto dos Santos took over. Even with the important shortage, Vasco still won the Torneio Relâmpago and Torneio Municipal that year. In this, Moacir Barbosa debuted, considered by many the greatest Vasco goalkeeper of all time.

In 1947, the coach Flávio Costa took over from Ernesto. The highlight of the season was the attack from Vasco, made up of Djalma, Maneca, Friaça, Lelé and Chico. In the Torneio Municipal there were 40 goals in 10 games; in the Campeonato Carioca the team scored 68 times in 20 games. In this one, the cast applied several routs, highlighting the 14–1 over Canto do Rio, the highest score of the professional era of Rio de Janeiro football. Ademir de Menezer would return to Vasco at the end of 1947.

=== First continental champion in history ===
On December 18, 1947, Vasco received the official invitation to compete in the 1948 South American Championship of Champions, in Santiago, organized by the Chilean champions club Colo-Colo. In addition to Vasco and the organizer, five more clubs took part in the competition: the Argentine River Plate, the Uruguayan Nacional, the Bolivian Litoral, the Ecuatorian Emelec, and the Peruvian Deportivo Municipal. This was the great favorite of the tournament: exercising wide dominance over Argentine football in the 40's, the River Plate's La Máquina had Alfredo Di Stéfano as its great star, considered the best player in the world at the time, while the Argentine squad was considered the great South American squad. Another club pointed out as a favorite was Nacional. Vasco, on the other hand, did not enjoy such prestige among the international chronicle.

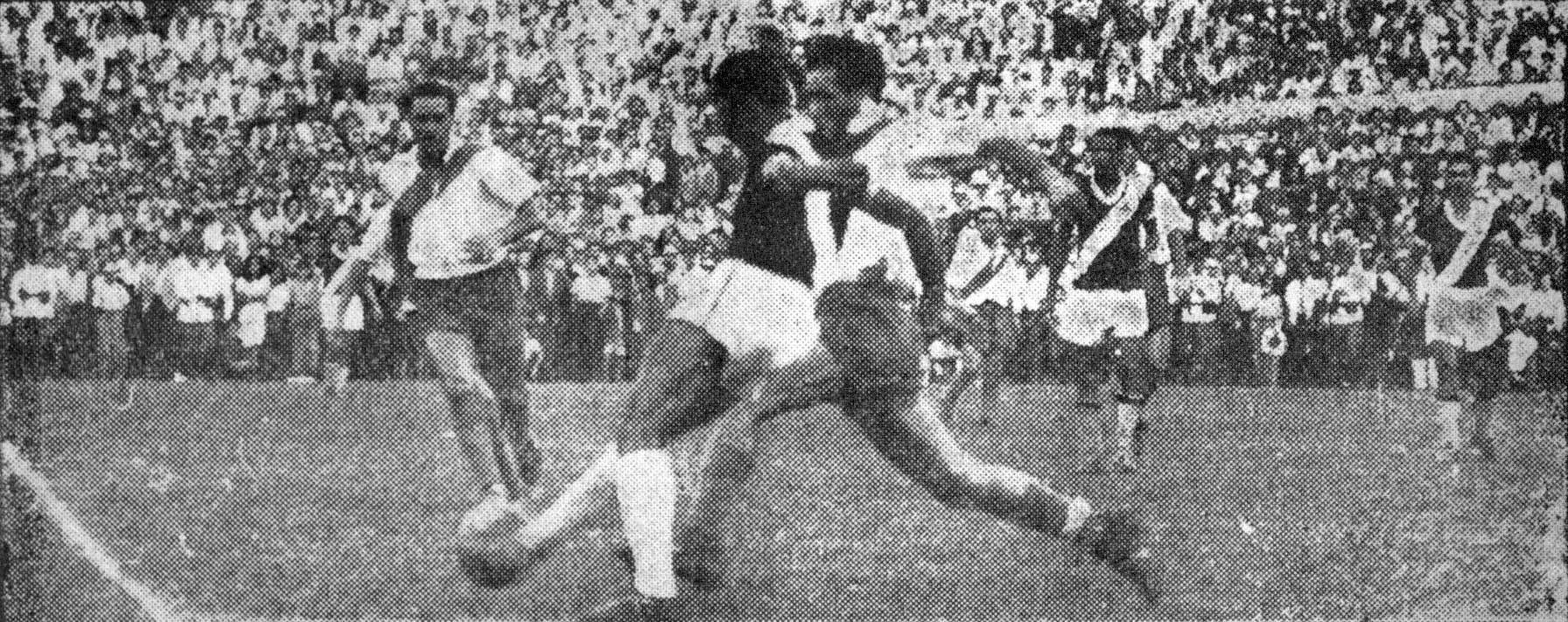
Vasco da Gama against River Plate for 1948 South American Championship.

Vasco da Gama landed in Santiago on February 8. The Vasco delegation consisted of 26 members under the leadership of Diogo Rangel: the director, Octávio Póvoas; the physician Amílcar Giffoni; the masseuse Mario Américo; cook Laudelino de Oliveira; referee Alberto da Gama Malcher; journalist Ricardo Serran (from the newspaper O Globo), coach Flavio Costa and eighteen players. The team was formed by the goalkeeper Moacir Barbosa, the defenders Augusto and Wilson, the midfielders Danilo Alvim, Ely and Jorge Dias, and the strikers Ademir Menezes, Chico, Djalma, Friaça, Ismael, Maneca and Lelé.

Vasco came away with the trophy after a deciding 0–0 draw against River Plate on the last round of matches. Vasco da Gama had already defeated Lítoral and Emelec 1–0 each, thumped Nacional 3–1, trashed Deportivo Municipal 4–0 and tied 1–1 with the host club Colo-Colo.

=== Last years ===
The team would win three more editions of the Campeonato Carioca in 1949, 1950 and 1952. The coach Flávio Costa was chosen to lead the Brazil national team in the 1950 FIFA World Cup, which also had six players from Vasco in its starting roster (Ademir, Augusto, Barbosa, Danilo, Friaça and Jair), while he was still at Vasco. In 1953, the club started looking for younger players. The old players were then replaced by new players, such as Vavá, Ademir's replacement, who was making his debut that year. Vavá would command a next Vasco team after Expresso da Vitória, which would go on to win important titles such as the 1957 Tournoi de Paris.

== Honours (1944–1953) ==
=== State ===
- Campeonato Carioca (5): 1945, 1947, 1949, 1950, 1952
- Torneio Relâmpago (2): 1944, 1946
- Torneio Início (3): 1944, 1945, 1948
- Torneio Municipal (4): 1944, 1945, 1946, 1947

=== Continental ===
- South American Championship of Champions (1): 1948

=== International ===
- Taça Centenários: 1947
- Troféu Presidente Juan Domingo Perón: 1948
- Quadrangular Internacional do Rio: 1953
- Taça Cinquentenário do Racing Club: 1953
- Torneio Internacional de Santiago: 1953
- Torneio Octogonal Rivadavia Correa Meyer: 1953

== Notable players ==
- (Brazil) Ademir de Menezes
- (Brazil) Alfredo II
- (Brazil) Augusto da Costa
- (Brazil) Hilderaldo Bellini
- (Uruguay) Sebastián Berascochea
- (Brazil) Chico
- (Brazil) Danilo Alvim
- (Brazil) Dimas da Silva
- (Brazil) Djalma
- (Brazil) Ely do Amparo
- (Brazil) Friaça
- (Brazil) Heleno de Freitas
- (Brazil) Ipojucan
- (Brazil) Ismael Caetano
- (Brazil) Jair Rosa Pinto
- (Brazil) Jorge Sacramento
- (Brazil) Lelé
- (Brazil) Maneca
- (Brazil) Moacir Barbosa
- (Brazil) Néstor Alves
- (Argentina) Ramón Rafanelli
- (Brazil) Sabará
- (Brazil) Tesourinha
- (Brazil) Wilson Francisco Alves
