= 1950 in Brazilian football =

Football in Brazil
- Season: 1950

The following article presents a summary of the 1950 football (soccer) season in Brazil, which was the 49th season of competitive football in the country.

== Torneio Rio-São Paulo ==
Final Standings

Position	Team	Points	Played	Won	Drawn	Lost	For	Against	Difference
1	Corinthians	11	7	5	1	1	20	15	5
2	Vasco da Gama	10	7	4	2	1	18	12	6
3	Portuguesa	9	7	4	1	2	27	26	1
4	Palmeiras	7	7	3	1	3	14	15	-1
5	Flamengo	6	7	2	2	3	18	17	1
6	São Paulo	5	7	2	1	4	18	23	-5
7	Botafogo	4	7	1	2	4	15	18	-3
8	Fluminense	4	7	2	0	5	14	18	-4

Corinthians declared as the Torneio Rio-São Paulo champions.

== Campeonato Paulista ==
Final Standings

Position	Team	Points	Played	Won	Drawn	Lost	For	Against	Difference
1	Palmeiras	32	22	13	6	3	45	22	23
2	São Paulo	31	22	13	5	4	54	26	28
3	Santos	31	22	13	5	4	47	34	13
4	Portuguesa	29	22	13	3	6	67	36	31
5	Corinthians	28	22	10	8	4	47	34	13
6	Guarani	23	22	9	5	8	34	41	-7
7	Ypiranga-SP	19	22	9	1	12	33	40	-7
8	Juventus	18	22	7	4	11	35	45	-10
9	XV de Piracicaba	17	22	6	5	11	30	40	-10
10	Portuguesa Santista	16	22	6	4	12	34	39	-5
11	Nacional-SP	12	22	4	4	14	20	55	-35
12	Jabaquara	8	22	3	2	17	23	57	-34

Palmeiras declared as the Campeonato Paulista champions.

== State championship champions ==
State	Champion	State	Champion
Acre	Rio Branco-AC	Paraíba	Treze
Alagoas	CRB	Paraná	Ferroviário-PR
Amapá	Amapá	Pernambuco	Náutico
Amazonas	Nacional	Piauí	River
Bahia	Bahia	Rio de Janeiro	Adrianino
Ceará	Ferroviário-CE	Rio de Janeiro (DF)	Vasco
Espírito Santo	Vitória-ES	Rio Grande do Norte	ABC
Goiás	Goiânia	Rio Grande do Sul	Internacional
Maranhão	Moto Club	Rondônia	Ferroviário-RO
Mato Grosso	Atlético Matogrossense	Santa Catarina	Carlos Renaux
Minas Gerais	Atlético Mineiro	São Paulo	Palmeiras
Pará	Remo	Sergipe	Passagem

== Other competition champions ==
Competition	Champion
Campeonato Brasileiro de Seleções Estaduais	Rio de Janeiro (DF)

== Brazil national team ==
The following table lists all the games played by the Brazil national football team in official competitions and friendly matches during 1950.

Date	Opposition	Result	Score	Brazil scorers	Competition
May 6, 1950	Uruguay	L	3-4	Zizinho, Ademir Menezes (2)	Copa Rio Branco
May 7, 1950	Paraguay	W	2-0	Pinga (2)	Taça Oswaldo Cruz
May 13, 1950	Paraguay	D	3-3	Pinga, Maneca, Baltazar	Taça Oswaldo Cruz
May 14, 1950	Uruguay	W	3-2	Ademir Menezes (2), Chico	Copa Rio Branco
May 18, 1950	Uruguay	W	1-0	Ademir Menezes	Copa Rio Branco
June 6, 1950	Rio Grande do Sul State Combined Team	W	6-4	Ademir Menezes (3), Jair da Rosa Pinto (2), Zizinho	International Friendly (unofficial match)
June 11, 1950	(São Paulo (state)) São Paulo State Combined Youth Team	W	4-3	Baltazar, Rodrigues (2), Ademir Menezes	International Friendly (unofficial match)
June 24, 1950	Mexico	W	4-0	Ademir Menezes (2), Jair da Rosa Pinto, Baltazar	World Cup
June 28, 1950	Switzerland	D	2-2	Alfredo, Baltazar	World Cup
July 1, 1950	Yugoslavia	W	2-0	Zizinho, Ademir Menezes	World Cup
July 9, 1950	Sweden	W	7-1	Ademir Menezes (4), Chico (2), Maneca	World Cup
July 13, 1950	Spain	W	6-1	Ademir Menezes (2), Jair da Rosa Pinto, Chico (2), Zizinho	World Cup
July 16, 1950	Uruguay	L	1-2	Friaça	World Cup
