= Vasconcelos (footballer) =

Brazilian footballer (1930 – 1983)

Personal information
- Full name: Wálter Vasconcelos Fernandes
- Date of birth: 25 May 1930
- Place of birth: Belo Horizonte, Brazil
- Date of death: 22 January 1983 (aged 52)
- Place of death: Brusque, Brazil
- Position: Forward

Senior career*
Years	Team	Apps	(Gls)
1947–1953	Vasco da Gama		
1953–1958	Santos	175	(111)
1958	São Paulo	6	(1)
1959–1960	Jabaquara		
1960–1961	Náutico		
1961	Apucarana		

International career
1955	Brazil	2	(0)
- * Club domestic league appearances and goals as of 30 December 2023

Wálter Vasconcelos Fernandes (25 May 1930 – 22 January 1983), simply known as Vasconcelos, was a Brazilian professional footballer who played as a forward.

== Career ==
Born in Belo Horizonte, Vasoncelos began his professional career at Vasco da Gama, being part of the champion team at the end of the 40s. He arrived at Santos in 1953 and stood out there with 111 goals in 175 appearances, being the team's greatest striker until his arrival of Pelé. His career changed, however, on 9 December 1956, after breaking his leg in an accidental throw. He was unable to repeat his great level of performance. He also played for São Paulo, Jabaquara, Náutico and Apucarana. He became an alcoholic and died as a result of his addiction at the age of 52.

== Honours ==
Vasco da Gama

- Campeonato Carioca: 1947, 1949, 1950
- South American Championship of Champions: 1948

Santos

- Campeonato Paulista: 1955, 1956

Individual

- 1953 Torneio Rio-São Paulo top scorer: 8 goals
