= Flávio Costa =

Brazilian footballer and manager (1906–1999)

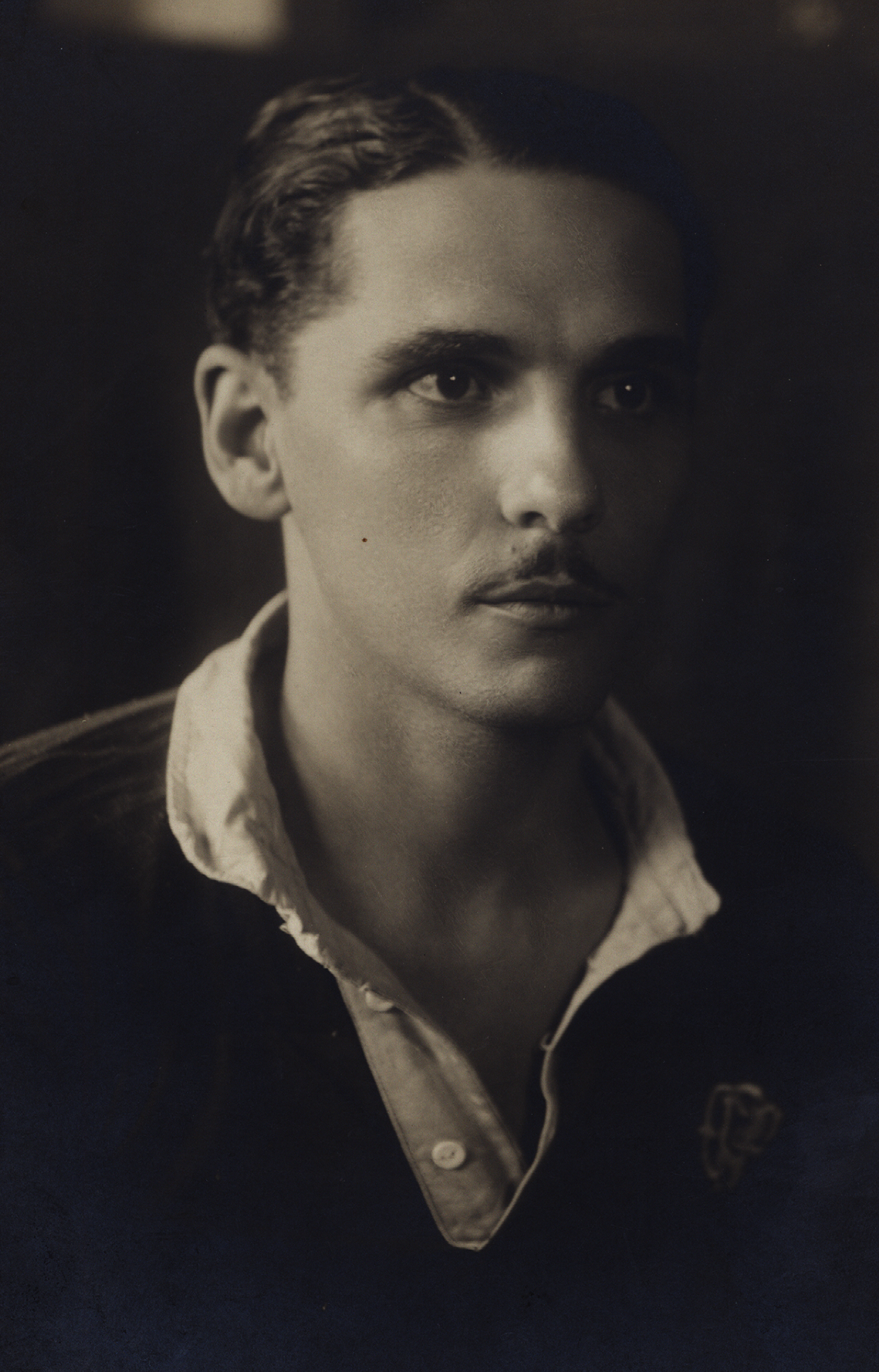

Personal information
- Full name: Flávio Rodrigues da Costa
- Date of birth: September 14, 1906
- Place of birth: Carangola, Minas Gerais, Brazil
- Date of death: November 22, 1999 (aged 93)
- Place of death: Rio de Janeiro, Brazil
- Position: Defensive midfielder

Senior career*
| Years | Team | Apps | (Gls) |
| 1926–1936 | Flamengo | 83 | (8) |

Managerial career
- 1934–1937: Flamengo
- 1937: Portuguesa-RJ
- 1938: Santos
- 1938–1945: Flamengo
- 1945–1950: Brazil
- 1946: Flamengo
- 1947–1950: Vasco da Gama
- 1951–1952: Flamengo
- 1953–1956: Vasco da Gama
- 1955–1956: Brazil
- 1956–1957: Porto
- 1957–1958: Portuguesa-SP
- 1959–1960: Colo-Colo
- 1960–1961: São Paulo
- 1962–1965: Flamengo
- 1965–1966: Porto
- 1968–1969: América
- 1970: Bangu
- * Club domestic league appearances and goals

Flávio Rodrigues da Costa (14 September 1906 – 22 November 1999) was a Brazilian football player and manager. He managed the Rio de Janeiro clubs Vasco da Gama and Flamengo, as well as Colo Colo of Chile, and FC Porto of Portugal.

Costa coached the Brazil national team at the 1950 FIFA World Cup; the loss against Uruguay has been described as Brazil's greatest humiliation of the 20th century. As a consequence of his World Cup failure, he lost his prestige among the Brazilian press and supporters of the national team. However, he was again manager of the Brazilian team in 1955 and in 1956.

He died in Rio de Janeiro in November 1999.

== Playing career ==
From 1926 until 1936, Costa played 145 matches, mostly as a midfielder, in the black and red jerseys of Flamengo and scored 15 goals in the process. From September 1934 forward he was player-manager.

The climax of his playing career was the winning of the state championship of Rio de Janeiro in 1927.

== Managerial statistics ==
| Team | Nation | From | To | Record | | | | |
| Team | Nation | From | To | G | W | D | L | Win % |
|---|---|---|---|---|---|---|---|---|
| Flamengo | Brazil | 16 September 1934 | 10 January 1937 | 102 | 63 | 21 | 18 | 61.76 |
| Associação Atlética Portuguesa (RJ) | Brazil | 1937 | 1937 | 22 | 6 | 3 | 13 | 27.27 |
| Santos | Brazil | 1938 | 1938 | 16 | 7 | 2 | 7 | 43.75 |
| Flamengo | Brazil | 8 December 1938 | 18 November 1945 | 293 | 164 | 62 | 67 | 55.97 |
| Brazil | Brazil | 14 May 1944 | 16 July 1950 | 41 | 27 | 6 | 8 | 65.85 |
| Flamengo | Brazil | 10 March 1946 | 21 December 1946 | 49 | 27 | 6 | 16 | 55.1 |
| Vasco da Gama | Brazil | 1947 | 1950 | 114 | 92 | 13 | 9 | 80.7 |
| Flamengo | Brazil | 17 February 1951 | 21 December 1952 | 101 | 63 | 15 | 23 | 62.38 |
| Vasco da Gama | Brazil | 1953 | 1956 | 103 | 62 | 24 | 17 | 60.19 |
| Brazil | Brazil | 13 November 1953 | 13 November 1953 | 1 | 1 | 0 | 0 | 100 |
| Brazil | Brazil | 1 April 1956 | 8 August 1956 | 13 | 7 | 3 | 3 | 53.85 |
| FC Porto | Portugal | August 1956 | 3 April 1957 | 32 | 20 | 4 | 8 | 53.85 |
| Associação Portuguesa de Desportos | Brazil | 1957 | 1958 | 75 | 37 | 18 | 20 | 49.33 |
| Colo-Colo | Chile | 1959 | 1960 | 27 | 16 | 6 | 5 | 59.26 |
| São Paulo FC | Brazil | 1960 | 1961 | 64 | 31 | 16 | 17 | 48.44 |
| Flamengo | Brazil | 21 January 1962 | 22 July 1965 | 220 | 122 | 43 | 55 | 62.38 |
| FC Porto | Portugal | 1965 | 1966 | 29 | 17 | 7 | 5 | 58.62 |
| América | Brazil | 11 May 1968 | 19 October 1969 | 57 | 20 | 19 | 18 | 35.09 |
| Bangu | Brazil | 1970 | 1970 | 25 | 5 | 5 | 13 | 20 |
| Total | | | | 1,384 | 787 | 273 | 324 | 56.86 |

== Honours ==
=== As player ===
Flamengo

- Campeonato Carioca: 1927

=== As manager ===
Flamengo

- Campeonato Carioca: 1939, 1942, 1943, 1944, 1963, 1965

Vasco da Gama

- Campeonato Carioca: 1947, 1949, 1950
- South American Championship of Champions: 1948

FC Porto

- Primeira Divisão: 1955–56
- Taça de Portugal: 1955–56, 1956–57

Colo-Colo

- Campeonato Nacional: 1960

Brazil national team

- South American Championship: 1949
- FIFA World Cup runner-up: 1950
- Copa Roca: 1945
- Copa Rio Branco: 1947, 1950
- Taça Oswaldo Cruz: 1950, 1955, 1956
- Taça do Atlântico: 1956

Rio de Janeiro state team

- Campeonato Brasileiro de Seleções Estaduais: 1940, 1943, 1944, 1946, 1950

== See also ==
- List of football managers with the most matches
