= Moacir Barbosa =

Brazilian footballer (1921–2000)

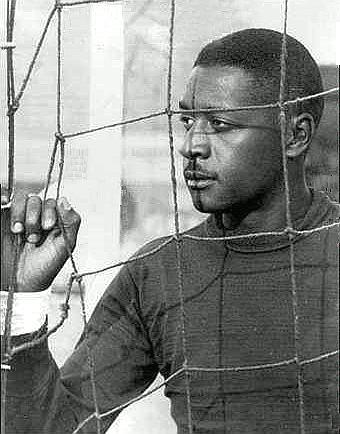
- Barbosa in 1945

Personal information
- Full name: Moacir Barbosa do Nascimento
- Date of birth: 27 March 1921
- Place of birth: Campinas, São Paulo, Brazil
- Date of death: 7 April 2000 (aged 79)
- Place of death: Praia Grande, Brazil
- Height: 1.74 m (5 ft 9 in)
- Position: Goalkeeper

Senior career*
Years	Team	Apps	(Gls)
1940–1941	ADCI-SP		
1942–1944	Ypiranga-SP		
1945–1955	Vasco da Gama	532	(0)
1956	→ Bonsucesso (loan)		
1957	Santa Cruz	34	(0)
1958–1960	Vasco da Gama	151	(0)
1962	Campo Grande		

International career
1945–1953	Brazil	20	(0)
Medal record
Men's Football
Representing Brazil
FIFA World Cup
Runner-up	1950 Brazil
South American Championship
Winner	1949 Brazil
Runner-up	1953 Peru
Third place	1959 Ecuador
- * Club domestic league appearances and goals

Moacir Barbosa do Nascimento (27 March 1921 – 7 April 2000) was a Brazilian professional footballer who played as a goalkeeper. His career spanned 22 years. He was regarded as one of the world's best goalkeepers in the 1940s and 1950s, and was known for not wearing gloves, as would be typical. Barbosa is mainly associated with Brazil's defeat against underdogs Uruguay in the decisive match of the 1950 FIFA World Cup, an upset dubbed the Maracanazo. Barbosa is also known for his achievements at Vasco da Gama, especially the first South American Championship, and the club's domination in the Campeonato Carioca in 1940s and 1950s.

== Club career ==
=== Success with Vasco da Gama ===
At club level, Barbosa had his greatest successes with Rio de Janeiro side CR Vasco da Gama. He won several trophies at Vasco, including the 1948 South American Championship of Champions, the original precursor to the Copa Libertadores.

== International career ==
=== 1949 Copa América ===
With the Brazilian national side, Barbosa won the 1949 Copa América. The 7–0 final victory over Paraguay remains to date the highest victory in a final of the competition.

=== The Maracanazo and its aftermath ===
At the 1950 FIFA World Cup held on home soil, Brazil played Uruguay in the decisive match of the World Cup finals at the Maracanã stadium in Rio de Janeiro. Brazil was heavily favoured to win and needed only a draw to win the round-robin tournament, but despite scoring first, they lost 2–1 when Alcides Ghiggia scored the winning goal for Uruguay in the 79th minute after skilfully dribbling past defender Bigode and then drilling the ball into the net while Barbosa was out of position, expecting a cross into the middle. The loss stunned Brazilians and plunged the country into mourning over what became known as the Maracanazo, or "the Maracanã blow". Barbosa was blamed for the defeat, for which he suffered for the rest of his life as the match became part of Brazilian folklore.

In 1963, Barbosa was presented with the old square wooden goalposts from the Maracanã as a present, which he took home and burned. Thirty years later, the president of the Brazilian Football Confederation, Ricardo Teixeira, did not allow him to be a commentator for the broadcast of an international match.

In 2000, Barbosa said in an interview: "The maximum punishment in Brazil is 30 years' imprisonment, but I have been paying, for something I am not even responsible for, by now, for 50 years." On 7 April of the same year, he died of a heart attack at the age of 79.

== In popular culture ==
Barbosa plays a large role in Ian McDonald's science fiction novel Brasyl. He is the subject of the biography The Last Save of Moacyr Barbosa, by Darwin Pastorin.

A Brazilian short film named Barbosa, premiered in 1988, in which a 49-year-old man (played by Antônio Fagundes) travels back in time trying to prevent Ghiggia's goal.

== Honours ==
Vasco da Gama

Official:

- Campeonato Carioca: 1945, 1947, 1949, 1950, 1952, 1958
- South American Championship of Champions: 1948
- Torneio Rio–São Paulo: 1958

Unofficial:

- Torneio Início Carioca: 1945, 1948, 1958
- Torneio Municipal: 1945, 1946, 1947
- Torneio Relâmpago: 1946
- Taça Centenários de Portugal: 1947
- Torneio Gerson dos Santos Coelho: 1948
- Trofeo Cinquentenario de Racing Club: 1953
- Torneio Quadrangular Internacional do Rio de Janeiro: 1953
- Torneo Internacional de Santiago de Chile: 1953
- Torneio Octogonal Rivadavia Correa Meyer: 1953
- Taça Cidade do Rio de Janeiro: 1959

Brazil national team

- Copa América: 1949
- FIFA World Cup runner-up: 1950
- Copa Roca: 1945
- Copa Rio Branco: 1947, 1950

Individual

- IFFHS Brazilian Keeper of the 20th Century: Third place
- IFFHS South American Keeper of the 20th Century: Eleventh place

== Books ==
- Darwin Pastorin, L'ultima parata di Moacyr Barbosa (The Last Save of Moacyr Barbosa) Arnoldo Mondadori Editore, 2005 (Published in Italy)
- Alex Bellos, Futebol: The Brazilian Way of Life, Bloomsbury, 2002
