= Augusto da Costa =

Brazilian footballer (1920-2004)

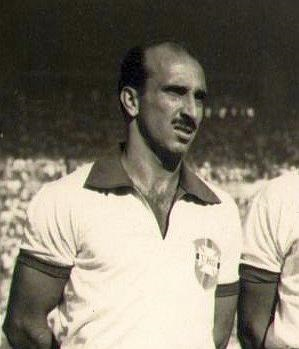
- Augusto lining up with Brazil at the 1950 FIFA World Cup

Personal information
- Full name: Augusto da Costa
- Date of birth: 22 October 1920
- Place of birth: Rio de Janeiro, Brazil
- Date of death: 1 March 2004 (aged 83)
- Place of death: Brazil
- Positions: Centre-back; right-back

Senior career*
Years	Team	Apps	(Gls)
1936–1944	São Cristóvão		
1945–1954	Vasco	297	(22)

International career
1946–1950	Brazil	18	(1)
Medal record
Men's Football
Representing Brazil
FIFA World Cup
Runner-up	1950 Brazil
Copa América
Winner	1949 Brazil
Runner-up	1946 Argentina
- * Club domestic league appearances and goals

Augusto da Costa (22 October 1920 – 1 March 2004), sometimes known as just Augusto, was a Brazilian footballer who played as a defender. He captained the Brazil national team to the 1950 FIFA World Cup final leading them to become the runners-up of the tournament after losing to Uruguay. He was born in Rio de Janeiro. He started his career in 1936, with São Cristóvão, leaving the club in 1944. In 1945 he joined to Vasco da Gama, retiring in 1954. He played 18 games for the Brazil national team and scored one goal.

== Honours ==
Vasco da Gama

- Campeonato Carioca: 1945, 1947, 1949, 1950, 1952
- South American Championship of Champions: 1948
- Torneio Octogonal Rivadavia Correa Meyer: 1953

Brazil

- Copa América: 1949
- FIFA World Cup runner-up: 1950

Individual

- Copa Rio Team of the Tournament: 1951
