= Wilson (footballer, born 1927) =

Brazilian footballer and manager

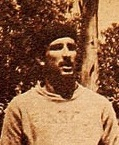
- Wilson in 1948

Personal information
- Full name: Wilson Francisco Alves
- Date of birth: 21 December 1927
- Place of birth: Rio de Janeiro, Brazil
- Date of death: 12 July 1998 (aged 70)
- Place of death: São Paulo, Brazil
- Position: Defender

Senior career*
Years	Team	Apps	(Gls)
1943–1952	Vasco da Gama		
1953–1954	Portuguesa		
1955–1957	Santos		

International career
1949	Brazil		

Managerial career
- 1963–1966: São Bento
- 1966–1967: Portuguesa
- 1968: Guarani
- 1968–1969: América-SP
- 1970–1971: São Bento
- 1971: Paulista
- 1972: América-SP
- 1973: Noroeste
- 1975: Marília
- 1975: Comercial-MS
- 1976–1977: Noroeste
- 1977–1978: Grêmio Maringá
- 1978: Comercial-MS
- 1979: América-SP
- 1979–1980: Marília
- 1981: São Bento
- 1981: Taubaté
- 1982: Grêmio Maringá
- 1982: América-SP
- 1985: Volta Redonda
- * Club domestic league appearances and goals

Wilson Francisco Alves - also known as Wilson only - (21 December 1927 – 12 July 1998) was a Brazilian football player and manager. The defender had his greatest successes with CR Vasco da Gama in the 1940s and 1950s, a club then known as Expresso da Vitória. With the Brazil national team he won a South American Championship. A highlight of his coaching years was the winning of a State Championship of Paraná, while he was considered a great Brazilian footballer.

== Career ==
Born in Rio de Janeiro, Wilson started to play at the age of 16 with the local club EC São José in Rio de Janeiro. From 1943 to 1952 he was part of CR Vasco da Gama, where he won five State Championships of Rio de Janeiro. The highlight of this period was the victory in the South American Championship of Champions 1948 in Chile, the predecessor of today's Copa Libertadores. From the decisive match of the tournament against Argentina's Champions CA River Plate it is reported that he marked the young Alfredo Di Stéfano "to perfection". Other notable players of Vasco in this era, remembered as o Expresso da Vitória ("the Victory Express") and managed initially by Ondino Viera and from 1947 by Flávio Costa, were amongst others the captain Augusto, goalkeeper Moacyr Barbosa and the attackers Jair da Rosa Pinto, Ademir Menezes and Chico.

Wilson was a core player of the Brazilian team that won the South American Football Championship of 1949. Altogether he played five times for his country, all matches in the successful tournament. Wilson finished his career as player until 1957 with Portuguesa and Santos FC where he won twice the São Paulo State Championship, generally known as Campeonato Paulista.

Wilson, frequently called Capão after Morro do Capão in Rio where he was born, then started a career as coach. In 1966 and 1967 he led Portuguesa through the matches of the Torneio Roberto Gomes Pedrosa, precursor to the national championship competition.

Between 1977 and 1982 he managed the campaigns of Grêmio Maringá, EC Comercial from Campo Grande (MS) and América FC from São José do Rio Preto (SP) in the national championships.

But on most occasions he coached small to midsize teams in small to midsize towns. In 1961 he took A. Prudentina EA from Presidente Prudente for the first time to the first division of the São Paulo state league. With Grêmio Maringá he won in 1977 the State Championship of Paraná, prevailing against the Coritiba Foot Ball Club in the finals with results of 1-0 and 1-1. With EC São Bento from Sorocaba (SP) he won the championships of the interior of the years 1964 and 1965 and in 1981 he defeated the national team of Saudi Arabia 1-0. Beyond this he coached numerous other clubs of the interior. Football-magazine Placar named him in 1975 in an article devoted to him the "best paid coach of the interior" and described him as rather focussing on friendship amongst the players, rather than "complicated tactics".

Wilson Francisco Alves, the Capão, died in São Paulo on 12 July 1998 at the age of 70 - the same day, when Brazil lost the final of the World Cup in France.

== Honours ==
=== As player ===
Brazil

- South American Football Championship: 1949

Clubs

- South American Championship of Champions: 1948
- State Championship of Rio de Janeiro: 1945, 1947, 1949, 1950, 1952
- State Championship of São Paulo: 1955, 1956

=== As coach ===
Clubs

- State Championship of Paraná: 1977
