= Chico (footballer, born 1922) =

Brazilian footballer and manager (1922–1997)

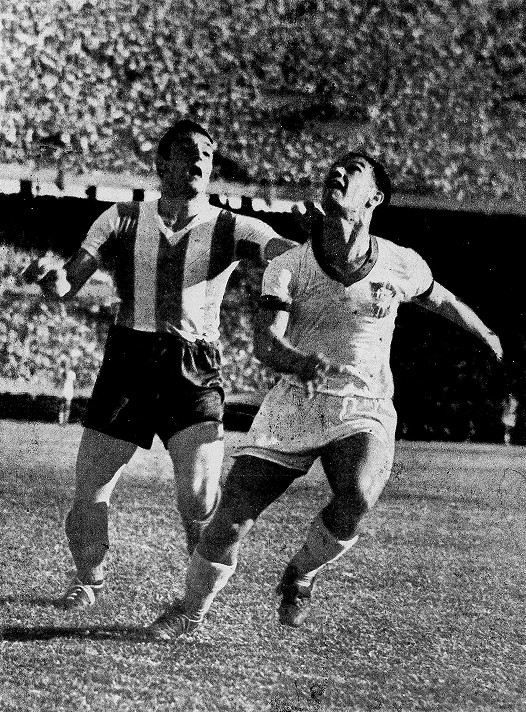
- Juan Carlos Fonda (left) and Francisco Aramburu (right) in 1946

Personal information
- Full name: Francisco Aramburu
- Date of birth: 7 January 1922
- Place of birth: Uruguaiana, Brazil
- Date of death: 1 October 1997 (aged 75)
- Place of death: Porto Alegre, Brazil
- Height: 1.68 m (5 ft 6 in)
- Position: Left winger

Senior career*
Years	Team	Apps	(Gls)
1939–1940	Ferro Carril		
1941–1942	Grêmio		
1942–1954	Vasco da Gama		
1955–1956	Flamengo		

International career
1945–1950	Brazil	21	(8)
Medal record
Representing Brazil
FIFA World Cup
Runner-up	1950 Brazil
Copa America
Runner-up	1946 Argentina
- * Club domestic league appearances and goals

Francisco Aramburu (7 January 1922 – 1 October 1997), commonly known as Chico, was a Brazilian footballer who played as a left winger.

Chico, commonly short for Francisco, commenced playing football in 1939, aged 17, in his hometown with EC Ferro Carril. A year later, he moved to the state capital Porto Alegre, where he was given the opportunity to display his skills in the colours of Grêmio. Just another year later in 1942 he followed an offer from CR Vasco da Gama in the then national capital Rio de Janeiro. the club with the Maltese cross in its crest then was the number five in town after Fluminense, Botafogo, Flamengo America-RJ.

The Uruguayan coach Ondino Viera, who before had won championships with Nacional in Montevideo, CA River Plate in Buenos Aires, joined Vasco at the same time. He not only reintroduced the since then typical kit with the diagonal strip, but also a number of tactical innovations. The former boxer Mário Américo, who would later acquire worldwide fame as the physiotherapist of the Brazil national team across seven World Cups from 1950 to 1974, was another new addition to the club.

By 1945, Viera had succeeded in establishing a competitive side and led the Vasco to the sixth state championship – undefeated. The Expresso da Vitrória as the team should be known from 1945 to 1952, benefited in particular from its strong attack with Ademir de Menezes, top scorer Lelé, Isaías, Jair da Rosa Pinto und Chico on the left wing. Chico, by then was already renowned as an athletic, fast, two-footed dribbler with a sharp shot and was soon considered for the national team.

In December 1945, he debuted for Brazil in São Paulo against Argentina in the series of matches for the Copa Roca. The hosts lost 3–4, but a few days later Brazil defeated Argentina 6–2 in the Estádio São Januário, Vasco's stadium. Chico contributed with one goal to this highest victory of Brazil against the archrival. Brazil secured the trophy in the deciding match at the same place, winning 3:1. Also, this series of matches between the two countries was marked by a very robust style. Argentina's Batagliero broke a leg in a duel with the 20-year-old Ademir.

In the 1950 FIFA World Cup, he played four games and scored four goals. He played in the famous game with Uruguay, which Brazil lost, known as "Maracanazo", ultimately resulting in Brazil's failure to win the 1950 World Cup. He was the third-highest top-scorer of the tournament, and won the Bronze Shoe award, along with Alcides Ghiggia, Telmo Zarra and Estanislau Basora.

== Honours ==
=== Club ===
Vasco da Gama

- Campeonato Carioca: 1945, 1947, 1949, 1950, 1952
- South American Championship of Champions: 1948
- Torneio Octogonal Rivadavia Correa Meyer: 1953

=== International ===
Brazil

- Copa América runner-up: 1946
- FIFA World Cup runner-up: 1950

=== Individuals ===
- FIFA World Cup Bronze Boot: 1950
- Brazilian Football Museum Hall of Fame
