= Roberto Capparelli =

Bolivian footballer (1923–2000)

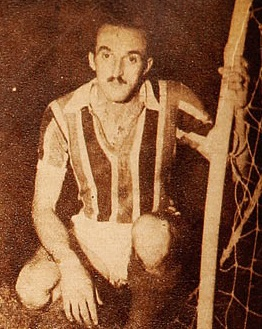
- Capparelli with The Strongest

Personal information
- Full name: Roberto Capparelli Coringrato
- Date of birth: November 18, 1923
- Place of birth: Argentina
- Date of death: 2000 (aged 76–77)
- Position: Forward

Senior career*
| Years | Team | Apps | (Gls) |
- Club Litoral
- The Strongest

International career
| 1950 | Bolivia | 1 | (0) |
- * Club domestic league appearances and goals

Roberto Capparelli Coringrato (November 18, 1923 – 2000) was an Argentine football forward who played for Bolivia in the 1950 FIFA World Cup. He also played for The Strongest.

== Overview ==
Capparelli spent his most successful years playing for The Strongest, being part of the team that won the 1945-46 Bolivian Primera División. In 1948 he was traded to Club Litoral that won the La Paz Football Association (LPFA) treble in 1947–49. The club also represented Bolivia in the South American Championship of Champions held in Chile in 1948, where Capparelli was also the topscorer of tournament.

In 1949 Capparelli returned to The Strongest and one year after he was called up for the Bolivia national team to compete at the 1950 FIFA World Cup. Capparelli had been naturalised Bolivian along with fellow countryman Antonio Grecco.
