= George Reader =

English football referee (1896–1978)

Personal information
- Date of birth: 22 November 1896
- Place of birth: Nuneaton, Warwickshire, England
- Date of death: 13 July 1978 (aged 81)
- Place of death: Southampton, England
- Position: Centre-forward

Youth career
- St Luke's College, Exeter

Senior career*
Years	Team	Apps	(Gls)
1919–1920	Exeter City	1	(1)
1920–1921	Southampton	3	(0)
1921–1922	Harland and Wolff		
1922–1930	Cowes		
- * Club domestic league appearances and goals

George Reader
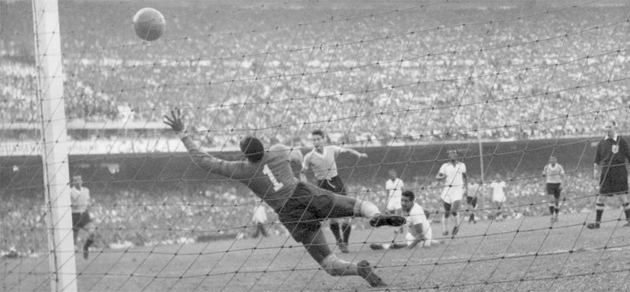
- Other occupation: Schoolteacher

Domestic
Years	League	Role
1936–1939	Football League	Linesman
1939–1944	Football League	Referee
1948–1950	Football League	Referee

International
Years	League	Role
1944–1950	FIFA listed	Referee

George Reader (22 November 1896 – 13 July 1978) was an English football referee, known for officiating in the 1950 FIFA World Cup Final. He is the first Englishman (one of only 10 match officials from the United Kingdom) to do so, and the oldest match official at any World Cup in history. He hailed from Nuneaton, Warwickshire.

== Early career ==
By profession he was a schoolmaster, going to St Luke's teacher training college (the same one that Ken Aston was to attend) just after the First World War in Exeter. St. Luke's is now part of Exeter University.

Finding work in Exeter as a young teacher, Reader first played as an amateur for Exeter City in the Southern Football League, in the 1919–20 season. It was with that club that he played in a friendly against Southampton on 3 January 1920, a week before the third round of the FA Cup. Reader scored and impressed the visiting side so much that they signed him for a fee of £50, as a handy replacement centre-forward to Bill Rawlings, who was a mainstay of the Saints side in the 1920s.

Unfortunately, given Rawling's abilities (he scored on average a goal every two games), Reader was unable to break into the side and played only three times in the old Third Division (South) before moving to Harland and Wolff for a year, and then playing on the Isle of Wight at Cowes until 1930, commuting on the ferry from his job as an assistant schoolmaster in Southampton.

== Refereeing ==
He first took up refereeing in 1930, appearing on Southampton Common, and progressed through the promotional system with an alacrity that underlined his ability and experience. Within six seasons he was running the line in the Football League, and three years later was invited to referee their matches in season 1939–40. That season was abandoned after three games, due to the start of the Second World War, and therefore Reader officially only refereed three Football League matches in his whole career.

However, during hostilities, Reader featured prominently in wartime football, and was appointed as referee in two War Cup finals and the British Home Championship and then, towards the end of hostilities, was appointed to take charge of Victory internationals between England and allied national teams. He retired from the Football League list in November 1944 but was still in such demand amongst foreign Football Associations that he was selected to officiate throughout Europe; in Barcelona for a Spain versus Argentina game in 1947, and also taking charge of matches in 1949 in Stockholm (between Sweden and Hungary), and in Geneva and Lisbon. In 1948 the Football League took the unusual step of recalling Reader from retirement to referee the Brentford versus Chelsea fixture at Griffin Park. His swansong, at the age of 50, appeared to be the Rest of Europe versus Great Britain representative match at Hampden Park, held to celebrate the "blessed Peace", but in 1949 England qualified for the FIFA World Cup finals in Brazil.

== 1950 FIFA World Cup ==
As an adjunct to England's participation, FIFA requested that a team of British match officials journey to Brazil for the 1950 FIFA World Cup. Despite reservations about his advanced age, Reader's international experience had placed him amongst those the Football Association could call on, and he was selected alongside Mervyn (Sandy) Griffiths (of Wales), George Mitchell (of Scotland) and the two English referees Reg Leafe and Arthur Ellis.

Given charge of the opening match, Reader's powers of control were put to the test just after Brazil scored their first goal against Mexico. As was the custom, the goal heralded a mass invasion by reporters demanding immediate responses from goalscorer and goalkeeper. Ellis, watching on, later wrote, in his book The Final Whistle: "How could any one man restore law and order? Somehow, George Reader did just that within a few minutes. He cleared the pitch almost single-handed and re-started the World Cup curtain-raiser as if it were an end-of-the-season fixture in the Yorkshire League." In their next match against the Swiss, the Brazilians voiced their criticisms of the Spanish referee, Ramón Azon Roma, stating that he had cost them victory (Jacques Fatton equalising in the 88th minute) and, as a result, the editor of a daily newspaper in São Paulo, Gazeta Esportivo, sang the praises of the British referees, telling his readers that even if they were to face England, Brazil would demand a British referee. "We must strongly demand that Brazil shall not take the field again in this World Championship if a British referee is not in charge. Even should we finally meet the English we shall still demand a British referee and have full confidence in him", he wrote. With England's early exit this unlikely event was averted. However, all four matches that Brazil played thereafter were refereed by one of the British contingent.

So, as Brazil won its way through to the final, and public expectation grew so much that it threatened to engulf even the massive Maracanã, each Brazilian game came to be refereed by one of the British team, including the decisive match of the final group stage.

=== Decisive game (Uruguay vs Brazil) ===
Reader had refereed two matches prior to the final group: the opening game (in which Brazil beat Mexico) and Uruguay's thrashing of the Bolivians in Group 4; but it was to be in his appointment to the final Brazilian game that he would secure his place in history. Although there was no provision for a final deciding match in this tournament, the last game of the tournament (albeit played at the same time as the Sweden v Spain fixture) was the determining fixture. Reader was appointed to referee this match, with Ellis and Mitchell running the lines. On the day of the final, Reader was 53 years and 236 days old, significantly older than any referee who officiated in the FIFA World Cup final at any other tournament.

Approximate recordings for the attendance that day differ wildly. FIFA consider that there were 174,000 people there, although other estimates indicate that there may have been between 199,854 and as many as 250,000 (which would have been more people than lived in Reader's Southampton at the time). In any event, it is the highest recorded attendance at a football match in history.

In the 47th minute of the game Obdulio Varela of Uruguay took the ball out of the net after Friaça's goal had put Brazil 1–0 up. Varela strode up to Reader and started arguing incomprehensibly in Spanish to the monolingual referee. By the time Reader had waved play to begin again, the crowd had settled and Varela had issued the rousing cry: "Now, it's time to win!" Brazil lost in such a shocking, emotional manner that suicides were reported at the stadium, and Jules Rimet would comment (about the lack of noise from the massed banks of the Maracanã): "The silence was morbid, sometimes too difficult to bear."

== Retirement ==
Uruguay went on to win and Reader returned home to Hanley Road in Southampton and promptly retired from refereeing, stating that he had had everything that football can give him. He ended his teaching career as headmaster of Western School, Shirley, in 1960.

George Reader became a director, and later chairman, of Southampton in 1963, and sat beside HM The Queen when Lawrie McMenemy's side won the 1976 FA Cup Final, dying on the anniversary of the first World Cup matches two years later.

Preceded by (France) Georges Capdeville	FIFA World Cup final match referees 1950 (England) George Reader	Succeeded by (England) William Ling
