= Ely (footballer) =

Brazilian footballer (1921–1991)

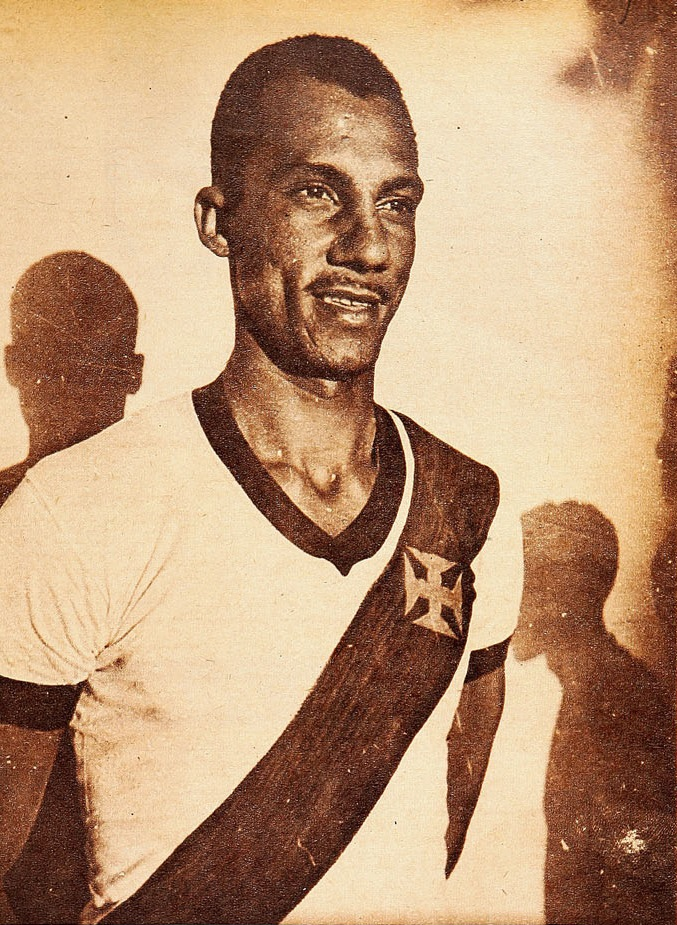
- Ely in 1948

Personal information
- Full name: Ely do Amparo
- Date of birth: 14 May 1921
- Place of birth: Paracambi, Brazil
- Date of death: 9 March 1991 (aged 69)
- Place of death: Paracambi, Brazil
- Position: Centre-back

Senior career*
| Years | Team | Apps | (Gls) |
| 1939 | América | | |
| 1940–1945 | Canto do Rio | | |
| 1945–1952 | Vasco | | |
| 1953–1955 | Sport | | |

International career
| 1949–1954 | Brazil | 17 | (0) |
Medal record
Men's Football
Representing Brazil
FIFA World Cup
| Runner-up | 1950 Brazil |
Copa América
| Winner | 1949 Brazil |
| Runner-up | 1953 Peru |
Panamerican Championship
| Winner | 1952 Chile |
- * Club domestic league appearances and goals

Ely do Amparo (14 May 1921 – 9 March 1991), commonly known as just Ely, was a Brazilian professional footballer who played as a centre-back. He played for Brazil in two World Cups.

== Career ==
Ely do Amparo started his career with América in 1939. He joined Canto do Rio in 1940, leaving the club in 1945 to join Vasco. Ely, as part of Vasco's Expresso da Vitória squad, won the Campeonato Carioca in 1945, 1947, 1949, 1950 and in 1952, winning the South American Club Championship in 1948 as well. Ely was transferred to Sport in 1953, winning the Campeonato Pernambucano in that year and in 1955, when he retired.

=== National team ===
Ely played 19 games for the Brazil national team, including being part of the World Cup squad in 1950 and in 1954. He was part of the squad that won the Panamerican Championship in 1952.

== Honours ==
=== Club ===
Sport

- Campeonato Pernambucano: 1953, 1955

Vasco

- Campeonato Carioca: 1945, 1947, 1949, 1950, 1952
- South American Championship of Champions: 1948

=== Country ===
Brazil

- South American Championship: 1949
- Panamerican Championship: 1952
- FIFA World Cup runner-up: 1950
