= Nestor (footballer) =

Brazilian footballer (1926–1987)

Personal information
- Full name: Nestor Alves da Silva
- Date of birth: 23 June 1926
- Place of birth: Niterói, Rio de Janeiro, Brazil
- Date of death: 13 September 1987 (aged 61)
- Place of death: São Paulo, Brazil
- Position: Outside right

Youth career
- 1944-1945: Fonseca-RJ

Senior career*
Years	Team	Apps	(Gls)
1945-1946	Canto do Rio	29	(9)
1947-1950	Vasco da Gama	93	(17)
1950-1951	Palmeiras	26	(3)
1951-1952	Flamengo	47	(13)
1952-1956	XV de Jaú	146	(53)
1956-1957	Palmeiras	63	(19)
1957-1958	Noroeste	34	(11)
1958-1959	Londrina		
1959-1960	Prudentina		

International career
1956	Brazil	3	(0)

Managerial career
- 1958: Noroeste (player-manager)
- 1961–1964: Prudentina
- 1964–1966: Grêmio Maringá
- 1968: Atlético Paranaense
- 1970–1971: Grêmio Maringá
- 1971: Atlético Paranaense
- 1976: XV de Jaú
- 1977: Inter de Limeira
- 1977: Grêmio Maringá
- 1978: XV de Piracicaba
- 1980: Inter de Limeira
- 1980: Noroeste
- * Club domestic league appearances and goals

Nestor Alves da Silva (23 June 1926 – 13 September 1987), known simply as Nestor, was a Brazilian footballer who played for the Brazil national football team in 1956. Additionally, he was a part of Brazil's squad for the 1956 South American Championship.

Nestor began his career in Niterói-RJ, in 1944, playing for the teams Fonseca and Canto do Rio. From 1947 until the beginning of 1950, he played for Vasco da Gama, among his main achievements being the Campeonato Carioca (Rio de Janeiro State Championship) in 1947 and 1949, as well as the South American Club Championship in 1948. He played in 93 games, scored 17 goals and provided 23 assists.

After leaving São Januário, he played for Palmeiras and had stints at Flamengo, XV de Jaú, Noroeste, Londrina, and ended his career at Prudentina-SP in 1960.

He was a coach between the 1960s and 1970s, working in the interior of São Paulo and Paraná state football, most notably winning the Paraná State Championship in 1964, by the Maringá team.

== Death ==
Nestor died in a car collision in São Paulo, on 13 September 1987, at the age of 61.

== Honours ==
Canto do Rio

- Campeonato Niteroiense: 1945

Vasco da Gama

- Campeonato Carioca: 1947 e 1948
- Sul-Americano de Clubes: 1948
- Torneio Início do Rio de Janeiro: 1948
- Torneio Municipal: 1947
- Taça Centenários de Portugal: 1947

Palmeiras

- Campeonato Paulista: 1950
- Taça Cidade de São Paulo: 1950

Seleção Paulista

- Brasileiro de Seleções Estaduais: 1956

Prudentina

- Campeonato Paulista Série A3: 1960
