= Friaça =

Brazilian footballer (1924-2009)

Albino Friaça
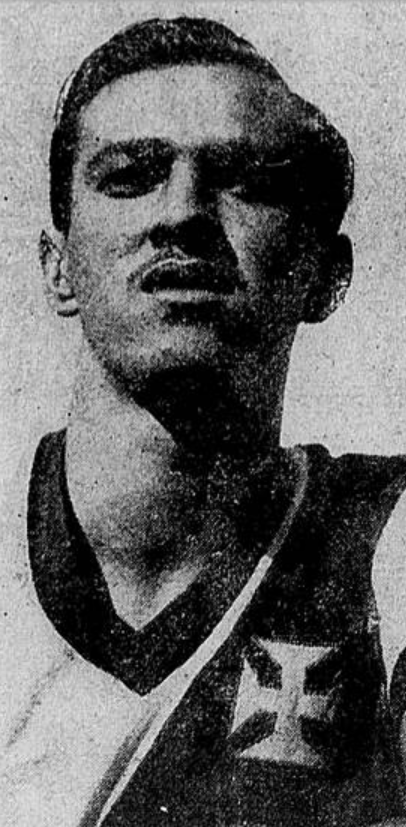
- Friaça in 1949

Personal information
- Full name: Albino Friaça Cardoso
- Date of birth: October 20, 1924
- Place of birth: Porciúncula, Brazil
- Date of death: January 12, 2009 (aged 84)
- Place of death: Itaperuna, Brasil
- Height: 1.78 m (5 ft 10 in)
- Position: Right winger

Senior career*
Years	Team	Apps	(Gls)
1944–1949	Vasco da Gama	432	(114)
1949–1951	São Paulo		
1951–1954	Vasco da Gama		
1954–1955	Ponte Preta		

International career
1947–1952	Brazil	13	(1)
Medal record
Men's Football
Representing Brazil
FIFA World Cup
Runner-up	1950 Brazil
Panamerican Championship
Winner	1952 Chile
- * Club domestic league appearances and goals

Albino Friaça Cardoso (October 20, 1924 – January 12, 2009), best known as simply Friaça ([ˈfɾjazɐ]), was a Brazilian footballer who played as a right winger.

He was born in Porciúncula. During his career (1944 – 1955) he played for Vasco da Gama, São Paulo and Ponte Preta. He won two Rio de Janeiro State Tournaments (1947, 1952), one São Paulo State Tournament (1949, in which he was also the top goalscorer), and the South American Championship of Champions (1948). With the Brazil national team he won one Copa América in 1949, and participated at 1950 FIFA World Cup, playing 4 matches and scoring the opening goal in the title-deciding match against Uruguay, which Brazil lost 1–2.

He died in Itaperuna in January 2009, aged 84, of pneumonia related organ failure.

== Honours ==
Vasco da Gama

- Campeonato Carioca: 1945, 1947, 1952
- Campeonato Sul-Americano de Campeões: 1948
- Torneio Octogonal Rivadavia Correa Meyer: 1953

São Paulo

- Campeonato Paulista: 1949

Brazil

- Panamerican Championship: 1952
- FIFA World Cup runner-up: 1950

Individual

- Copa Rio Team of the Tournament: 1951
