= 1953 Torneio Rio-São Paulo =

Torneio Rio-São Paulo
- Season: 1953
- Champions: Corinthians (2nd title)
- Matches played: 45
- Goals scored: 164 (3.64 per match)
- Top goalscorer: Vasconcelos (Santos) – 8 goals
- Biggest home win: Corinthians 6–0 Flamengo (3 May)

The 1953 Torneio Rio São Paulo was the 7th edition of the Torneio Rio-São Paulo. It was disputed between 4 April to 4 June.

== Participants ==
Team	City	Nº participations	Best result
Bangu	Rio de Janeiro	5	3rd (1951)
Botafogo	Rio de Janeiro	4	6th (1951)
Corinthians	(São Paulo (state)) São Paulo	7	Champions: 1950
Flamengo	Rio de Janeiro	6	4th (1951)
Fluminense	Rio de Janeiro	6	4th (1952)
Palmeiras	(São Paulo (state)) São Paulo	7	Champions: 1933, 1951
Portuguesa	(São Paulo (state)) São Paulo	7	Champions: 1952
Santos	(São Paulo (state)) Santos	4	5th (1952)
São Paulo	(São Paulo (state)) São Paulo	7	Runners-up: 1933
Vasco da Gama	Rio de Janeiro	7	Runners-up: 1950, 1952

== Format ==
The tournament were disputed in a single round-robin format, with the club with most points conquered being the champions.

== Tournament ==
Following is the summary of the 1953 Torneio Rio-São Paulo tournament:

Pos	Team	Pld	W	D	L	GF	GA	GD	Pts
1	(São Paulo (state)) Corinthians (C)	9	5	2	2	22	13	+9	12
2	Vasco da Gama	9	4	3	2	13	9	+4	11
3	(São Paulo (state)) São Paulo	9	4	2	3	12	9	+3	10 (Note: Tied in points)
4	Botafogo	9	3	4	2	16	14	+2	10
5	Fluminense	9	3	3	3	18	16	+2	9
6	Bangu	9	4	0	5	17	19	−2	8 (Note: Tied in points)
7	(São Paulo (state)) Palmeiras	9	2	4	3	19	22	−3	8
8	Flamengo	9	1	6	2	14	20	−6	8
9	(São Paulo (state)) Santos	9	3	1	5	20	22	−2	7 (Note: Tied in points)
10	(São Paulo (state)) Portuguesa	9	3	1	5	13	20	−7	7

Source: RSSSF
Rules for classification: 1) points; 2) wins; 3) goal difference; 4) goals for.
(C) Champions
