= Santo Cristo (footballer) =

Brazilian footballer

Personal information
- Full name: Walter Goulart da Silveira
- Date of birth: 12 September 1922
- Place of birth: Rio de Janeiro, Brazil
- Date of death: 30 August 2003 (aged 80)
- Place of death: Rio de Janeiro, Brazil
- Position: Right winger

Youth career
- Vasco da Gama
- Bonsucesso
- SC Oposição (Piedade)
- Mavilis FC (Caju)

Senior career*
Years	Team	Apps	(Gls)
1942–1944	São Cristóvão		
1945–1946	Vasco da Gama	71	(34)
1947	Botafogo		
1948	São Paulo	21	(10)
1948–1951	Fluminense	88	(32)
1951	Guarani		
1952–1953	XV de Piracicaba		
1953	Portuguesa	8	(3)
1953–1954	Ferroviária		
1955	Atlético Mineiro	8	(2)
1956	Olaria		

Managerial career
- 1959: São Cristóvão
- 1961: Tupynambás
- * Club domestic league appearances and goals as of 28 December 2023

Walter Goulart da Silveira (12 September 1922 – 30 August 2003), better known as Santo Cristo, was a Brazilian professional footballer who played as a right winger.

== Career ==
Right winger, he was top scorer for most of the clubs he played for. At Vasco, he formed a great partnership alongside Manoel Pessanha. He was also state champion with São Paulo FC in 1948 and Atlético Mineiro in 1955.

== Personal life ==
Walter received the nickname "Santo Cristo" for being born in the Santo Cristo, Rio de Janeiro. In 1943, he abandoned a flight from São Paulo to Rio de Janeiro just minutes before boarding. The plane ended up crashing in Guanabara Bay, killing 18 people, including Cásper Líbero, founder of the journal A Gazeta, and Dom José Gaspar de Afonseca e Silva, archbishop of São Paulo.

== Honours ==
=== Player ===
Vasco da Gama

- Campeonato Carioca: 1945
- Taça da Prefeitura do Distrito Federal: 1945, 1946

Botafogo

- Torneio Início: 1947

São Paulo

- Campeonato Paulista: 1948

Atlético Mineiro

- Campeonato Mineiro: 1955

=== Manager ===
Tupynambás

- Campeonato Municipal de Juiz de Fora: 1961
