= Alfredo II =

Brazilian footballer (1920-1997)

Personal information
- Full name: Alfredo dos Santos
- Date of birth: January 1, 1920
- Place of birth: Rio de Janeiro, Brazil
- Date of death: October 23, 1997 (aged 77)
- Position: Midfielder

Senior career*
Years	Team	Apps	(Gls)
1937–1948	Vasco da Gama		
1949	Flamengo		
1949–1956	Vasco da Gama		

International career
1944–1953	Brazil	4	(1)
Medal record
Representing Brazil
FIFA World Cup
Runner-up	1950 Brazil
- * Club domestic league appearances and goals

Alfredo dos Santos^{1} (January 1, 1920 – October 23, 1997), best known as Alfredo II, was a Brazilian footballer in midfielder role. He was born in Rio de Janeiro.

During his career (1937–1956), he played for Vasco da Gama, except one year with Flamengo (1949). As another Alfredo played in Vasco, he earned the nickname "Alfredo Segundo" ("Alfredo the Second", transcribed as Alfredo II). He won five Carioca Tournaments (1945, 1947, 1949, 1950 and 1952) and the South American Club Championship in 1948. For the Brazilian team he played at the 1950 FIFA World Cup, starting one match against Switzerland (2–2) on June 28, 1950, when he scored a goal in the third minute.

== Honours ==
Vasco da Gama

- Campeonato Carioca: 1945, 1947, 1949, 1950, 1952
- Campeonato Sul-Americano de Campeões: 1948
- Torneio Octogonal Rivadavia Correa Meyer: 1953

Brazil

- Copa América runner-up: 1945, 1953
- FIFA World Cup runner-up: 1950
