= Porciúncula =

- Municipality
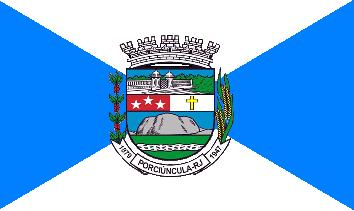
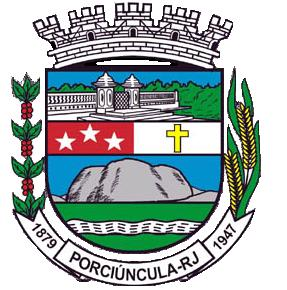
- Flag Coat of arms

- Location in the state of Rio de Janeiro and Brazil
- Coordinates: 20°57′46″S 42°02′27″W
- Country: Brazil
- Region: Southeast
- State: Rio de Janeiro
- Founded: August 21, 1947

Government
  - Mayor: Guilherme Fonseca Cardoso (PSD)

Area
  - Total: 291.847 km^{2} (112.683 sq mi)
- Elevation: 190 m (620 ft)

Population (2022)
  - Total: 17,288
  - Density: 59.237/km^{2} (153.42/sq mi)
- Time zone: UTC−3 (BRT)
- Postal code: 28390-000
- HDI (2000): 0.730 – medium
- Website: www.porciuncula.rj.gov.br

Porciúncula (Portuguese pronunciation: [poʁsiˈũkulɐ]) is a municipality located in the northernmost point of the Brazilian state of Rio de Janeiro. Its population was 17,288 (2022) and its area is 291.847 km^{2}.
