= Dimas da Silva =

Brazilian footballer

Dimas
Personal information
- Full name: Dimas da Silva
- Date of birth: 20 February 1927
- Place of birth: Divinópolis, Brazil
- Date of death: Unknown
- Position: Forward

Senior career*
Years	Team	Apps	(Gls)
1945–1946	Tupi		
1946–1949	Vasco da Gama	90	(55)
1949–1952	America-RJ		
1953–1954	Sport Recife		
1954–1955	Vitória		
1955–1956	América-PE		
- * Club domestic league appearances and goals as of 22 March 2024

Dimas da Silva (20 February 1927 – ?) was a Brazilian professional footballer who played as a forward.

== Career ==
Revealed by Tupi de Juiz de Fora, he was bought by Vasco after standing out in a friendly match against the club. He was state champion and top scorer in 1947 with 18 goals scored, in addition to being part of the champion squad of the tournament of champions in 1948.

== Honours ==
Vasco da Gama

- Campeonato Carioca: 1947
- South American Championship of Champions: 1948

Individual

- 1947 Campeonato Carioca top scorer: 18 goals
