= South American Championship of Champions =

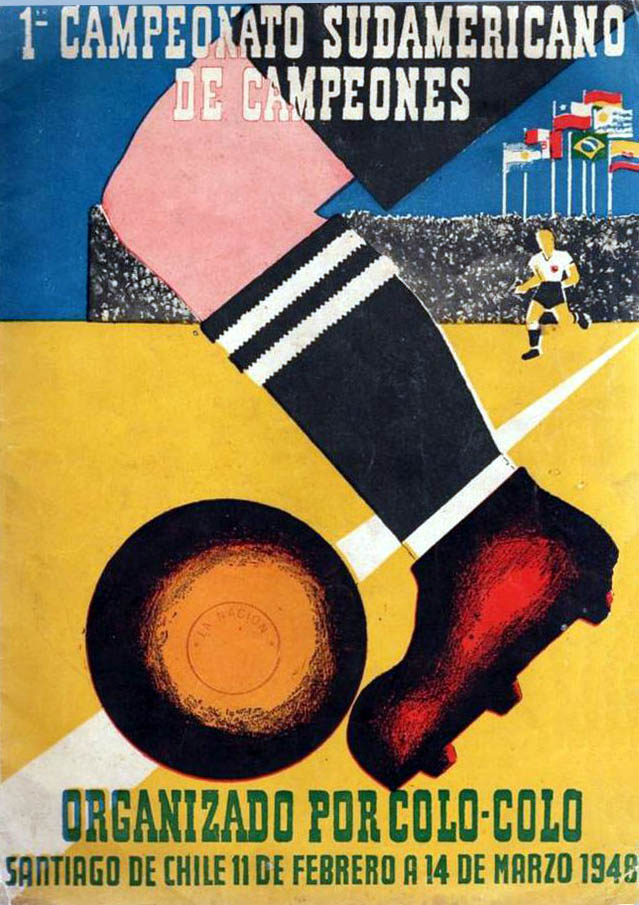
- Official poster
- Organiser(s): CSD Colo-Colo
- Founded: 1948
- Abolished: 1948; 78 years ago
- Region: South America
- Teams: 7
- Last champions: (Brazil) Vasco da Gama

The South American Championship of Champions (Spanish: Campeonato Sudamericano de Campeones, Portuguese: Campeonato Sul-Americano de Campeões) was a football competition played in Santiago, Chile in 1948 and the first continental-wide clubs football tournament in South America. Hosted and organized by Chilean club Colo Colo with the aid of then president of CONMEBOL Luis Valenzuela, it was played between February 11 and March 17. Brazil's Vasco da Gama won the competition after earning the most points in the round-robin tournament.

The tournament was the first tournament ever played to determine the South American club champion, and thus is seen as the precursor to the Copa Libertadores and is considered, along with the Copa Aldao (also named "Copa Río de La Plata"), as an important stepping stone towards its creation. The 1948 competition was recognised by Conmebol with the participation of Vasco da Gama in the 1997 Supercopa Libertadores, a Conmebol competition that accepted the participation of Copa Libertadores winners only, and is referred to at the Conmebol website as the competition that, 12 years later, would become the Copa Libertadores.

== Background ==
Since the early 1910s, Argentine and Uruguayan clubs disputed the Copa Aldao, a tournament played between the national champions of each nation's top national leagues. The great success of this tournament gave birth to the idea of a continental competition.

In 1929, the head executives of Nacional, Roberto Espil and José Usera Bermúdez, idealized a competition between the national champions of each CONMEBOL member. After analyzing the geographical distributions and distances, Espil devised a project in 1946 which also included the runners-up of every national league. However, it was in 1948 that Colo-Colo's head executive, Robinson Alvarez Marín, and CONMEBOL president, Luis Valenzuela, finally set into motion the precursor to the Copa Libertadores: the "South American Championship of Champions", the first ever tournament played in order to determine the champion club of South America.

== Participants ==
The aim of the organizers was to invite the reigning champion club of the most important competition of each South American country. The tournament aimed at featuring only one club, the reigning champion one, from each country, a model that would be followed in the early editions of "champions cup" tournaments such as the European Cup and the Copa Libertadores. The 1948 tournament featured 7 clubs/countries, the same number of Copa Libertadores inaugural edition.

Most notable in the 1948 competition were the host Colo-Colo, the Di Stéfano-inspired River Plate (La Máquina), the Atilio García-inspired Nacional, and Vasco da Gama, the respective representatives of Chile, Argentina, Uruguay and Brazil, four countries whose clubs would go on to become the dominant powers of South American football, aggregately winning all Copa Libertadores from 1960 to 1978 and over 90% of the Copa Libertadores from 1960 to the present day.

Country	Team	Qualification
Argentina	River Plate	1947 Primera División champion
Bolivia	Litoral	1947 La Paz champion (Note: No national club championship existed then in Bolivia so the country was represented by the current champion of capital city La Paz.)
Brazil	Vasco da Gama	1947 Campeonato Carioca champion (Note: No national club championship existed then in Brazil so the champion of Rio de Janeiro, then Brazil's capital, Vasco da Gama, represented the country. They were given preference over Palmeiras, the São Paulo state champion, since Rio de Janeiro won the latest 3 (1943-1944-1946) editions of the Brazilian Championship of State Teams and thus was considered the champion of the stronger league.)
Chile	Colo-Colo	Host and 1947 Primera División champion
Ecuador	Emelec	1946 Guayaquil champion (Note: No national club championship existed then in Ecuador so Emelec, the Guayaquil Championship champion of 1946 was given preference over the Pichincha champion as the 1947 South American Championship matches were held all at Emelec's stadium (Estadio George Capwell) and having Emelec's as the cornerstone of Ecuador's national team squad, which featured 8 players from the Guayaquil club in the 1947 South American Championship.)
Peru	Deportivo Municipal	1947 Primera División runner-up (Note: Deportivo Municipal took part in place of the Peruvian champions Atlético Chalaco, who declined the invitation to participate.)
Uruguay	Nacional	1947 Primera División champion

Notes:

Additional notes:

- No organized club championship existed then in Colombia (that would eventually be commenced still in 1948, but later that year, in August, whereas the South American Club Championship was held in Feb–Mar 1948).
- No reason is clear about the absence of a Paraguayan, though the 1947 Paraguayan Civil War may possibly have been the reason.
- Venezuela would become a party to CONMEBOL only in 1952, 4 years after the South American Club Championship.

== Notable players ==
Players who were considered big names at the time participated in the tournament: Labruna, Loustau, Norberto Yácono, Di Stefano, Moreno and Nestor Rossi for River Plate; Ademir Menezes, Chico and Moacir Barbosa for Vasco da Gama; José Santamaría at the age of 19 was part of the Nacional squad, which Luis Volpi had joined a year earlier after a short spell with Inter Milan.

== Tournament ==
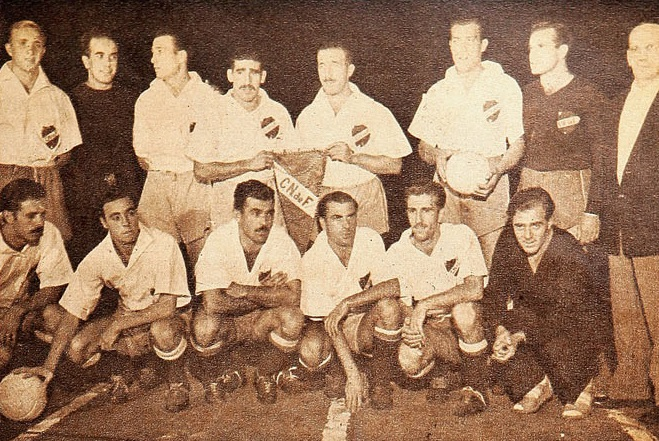
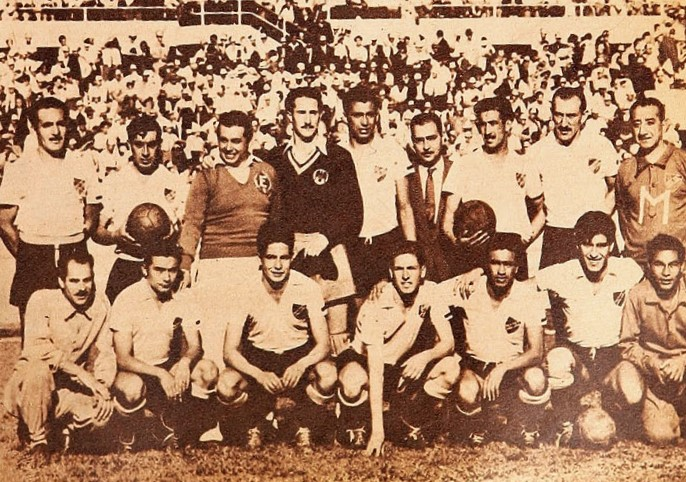
Two moments of the tournament, (left): team of Nacional; (right): team of Colo-Colo

The Vasco da Gama team, called Expresso da Vitória, led by figures such as Augusto, Barbosa, Danilo, Friaça, Ademir and Chico, came away with the trophy after a deciding 0–0 draw against River Plate on the last round of matches. The Argentine squad had arrived in Santiago with most of players of legendary team La Máquina such as José Manuel Moreno, Ángel Labruna and Félix Loustau, with the addition of rising star Alfredo Di Stéfano.

Vasco da Gama had already defeated Lítoral and Emelec 1–0 each, thumped Nacional 3–1, trashed Municipal 4–0 and tied 1–1 with the host club Colo-Colo. The competition was as successful financially as it was on the field: the average public attendance per game was 39,549 spectators and the tournament generated a gross of CLP 9,493,483.

== Final standings ==
Pos	Team	Pld	W	D	L	GF	GA	GD	Pts	(Brazil) VAS	(Argentina) RIV	(Uruguay) NAC	(Peru) DMU	(Chile) COL	(Bolivia) LIT	(Ecuador) EME
1	(Brazil) Vasco da Gama	6	4	2	0	12	3	+9	10		0–0	4–1	4–0		2–1	1–0
2	(Argentina) River Plate	6	4	1	1	12	4	+8	9				2–0		5–1	4–0
3	(Uruguay) Nacional	6	4	0	2	16	11	+5	8		3–0		3–2		3–1	4–1
4	(Peru) Deportivo Municipal	6	3	0	3	12	11	+1	6						3–1	4–0
5	(Chile) Colo-Colo	6	2	2	2	11	11	0	6	1–1	0–1	3–2	1–3		4–2	2–2
6	(Bolivia) Litoral	6	1	0	5	9	18	−9	2							3–1
7	(Ecuador) Emelec	6	0	1	5	4	18	−14	1							

Source: RSSSF
Legend: Blue = home team win; Yellow = draw; Red = away team win.

== Match results ==
Complete list of matches played in the tournament:

11 February
21:35 UTC−4

Colo-Colo (Chile)	2–2	(Ecuador) Emelec
Aranda 46'; Varela 57'	Report	Jiménez 14'; Yepes 17'

Estadio Nacional, Santiago
Attendance: ~70,000
Referee: Nobel Valentini (Uruguay)

14 February

Vasco da Gama (Brazil)	2–1	(Bolivia) Litoral
Lelé 9', 67'	Report	Sandoval 70'

Estadio Nacional, Santiago
Attendance: ~50,000
Referee: C. Leeson (Chile)

14 February

Nacional (Uruguay)	3–2	(Peru) Deportivo Municipal
W. Gómez 11', 27'; J. García 51'	Report	Cabada 29'; Guzmán 66'

Estadio Nacional, Santiago
Attendance: ~50,000
Referee: Eduardo Forte (Argentina)

18 February

River Plate (Argentina)	4–0	(Ecuador) Emelec
Martínez 10', 47' (pen.); Loustau 25', 40'	Report

Estadio Nacional, Santiago
Attendance: ~70,000
Referee: Nobel Valentini (Uruguay)

18 February

Vasco da Gama (Brazil)	4–1	(Uruguay) Nacional
Adhemir 12'; Maneca 66'; Danilo 68'; Friaca 89'	Report	W. Gómez 25'

Estadio Nacional, Santiago
Attendance: ~70,000
Referee: H. Madrid (Chile)

21 February

River Plate (Argentina)	2–0	(Peru) Deportivo Municipal
Loustau 61'; Labruna 71'	Report

Estadio Nacional, Santiago
Attendance: ~49,000
Referee: Nobel Valentini (Uruguay)

21 February

Colo-Colo (Chile)	4–2	(Bolivia) Litoral
López 13', 37' (pen.), 52'; Saenz 82'	Report	Capparelli 38', 67'

Estadio Nacional, Santiago
Attendance: ~49,000
Referee: A. da Gama (Brazil)

25 February

Nacional (Uruguay)	3–1	(Bolivia) Litoral
A. García 40', 55'; Orlandi 66'	Report	Rodríguez 60'

Estadio Nacional, Santiago
Attendance: 17,223
Referee: Eduardo Forte (Argentina)

25 February

Vasco da Gama (Brazil)	4–0	(Peru) Deportivo Municipal
Lelé 12'; Friaca 58', 70'; Ismael 61'	Report

Estadio Nacional, Santiago
Attendance: 17,223
Referee: J. White (Chile)

28 February

Vasco da Gama (Brazil)	1–0	(Ecuador) Emelec
Ismael 47'	Report

Estadio Nacional, Santiago
Referee: H. Madrid (Chile)

28 February

Deportivo Municipal (Peru)	3–1	(Chile) Colo-Colo
Mosquera 57', 60'; Torres 85'	Report	Varela 46'

Estadio Nacional, Santiago
Referee: A. da Gama (Brazil)

4 March

Litoral (Bolivia)	3–1	(Ecuador) Emelec
Capparelli 23', 48', 87' (pen.)	Report	Mendoza 70'

Estadio Nacional, Santiago
Referee: J. White (Chile)

4 March

Nacional (Uruguay)	3–0	(Argentina) River Plate
A. García 48'; Castro 57'; Orlandi 59'	Report

Estadio Nacional, Santiago
Referee: C. Paredes (Bolivia)

7 March

Deportivo Municipal (Peru)	4–0	(Ecuador) Emelec
Mosquera 12', 51'; Drago 35'; Perales 48'	Report

Estadio Nacional, Santiago
Referee: J. White (Chile)

7 March

Colo-Colo (Chile)	1–1	(Brazil) Vasco da Gama
Farías 46'	Report	Friaca 67'

Estadio Nacional, Santiago
Referee: C. Paredes (Bolivia)

10 March

River Plate (Argentina)	5–1	(Bolivia) Litoral
Di Stéfano 11', 47', 63'; Moreno 29'; Loustau 81'	Report	Capparelli 82' (pen.)

Estadio Nacional, Santiago
Referee: J. White (Chile)

10 March

Colo-Colo (Chile)	3–2	(Uruguay) Nacional
Lorca 15'; López 70' (pen.); Peñaloza 74'	Report	A. García 4'; W. Gómez 47'

Estadio Nacional, Santiago
Referee: A. da Gama (Brazil)

14 March

Nacional (Uruguay)	4–1	(Ecuador) Emelec
Gambetta 5'; A. García 29'; Orlandi 37'; Gambetta 56'	Report	Fernández 87' (pen.)

Estadio Nacional, Santiago
Referee: S. Bustamante (Chile)

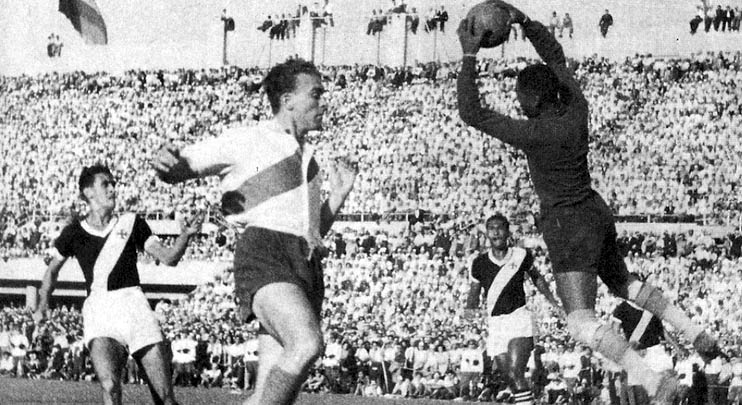
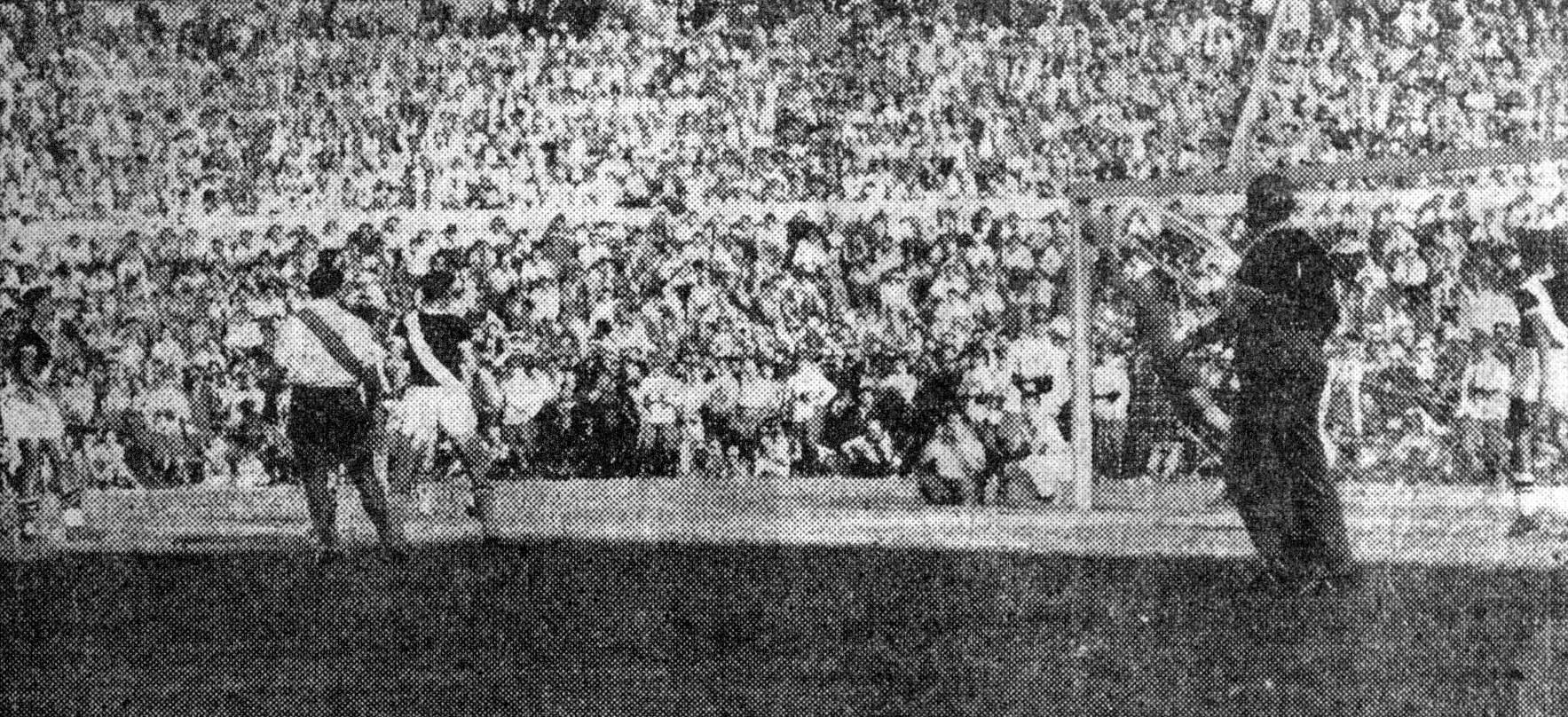
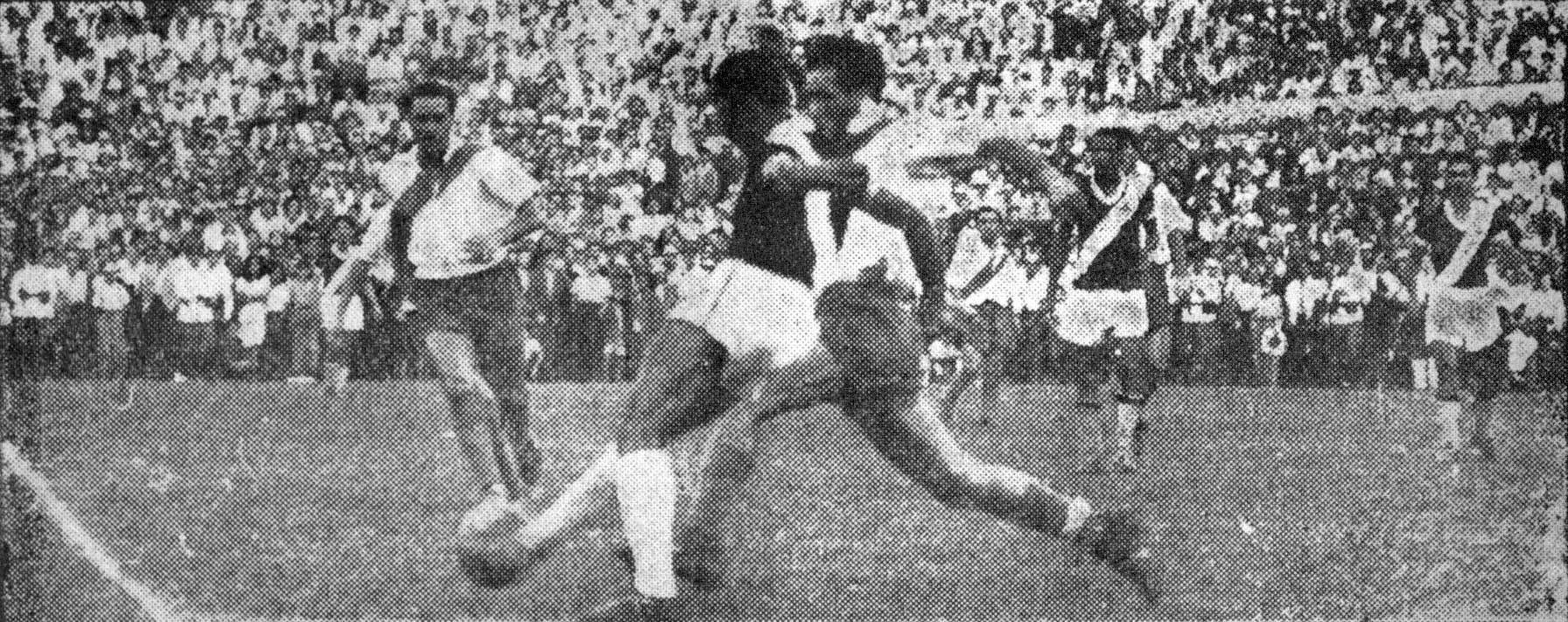
Some moments of the Vasco da Gama v River Plate match, when the Brazilian team crowned champions
14 March

Vasco da Gama (Brazil)	0–0	(Argentina) River Plate
	Report

Estadio Nacional, Santiago
Referee: Nobel Valentini (Uruguay)

Team details

Vasco da Gama
River Plate

GK	(Brazil) Moacir Barbosa
DF	(Brazil) Augusto da Costa
DF	(Brazil) Wilson	(substituted off) 66'
MF	(Brazil) Ely
MF	(Brazil) Danilo
MF	(Brazil) Jorge Sacramento
FW	(Brazil) Djalma
FW	(Brazil) Maneca
FW	(Brazil) Friaça
FW	(Brazil) Ismael Caetano
FW	(Brazil) Chico	(red card) 74'
Substitutes:
DF	(Argentina) Ramón R. Raffanelli	(substituted on) 66'
Manager:
(Brazil) Flavio Costa

GK	(Argentina) Héctor Grisetti
DF	(Argentina) Ricardo Vaghi
DF	(Argentina) Eduardo Rodríguez
MF	(Argentina) Norberto Yácono	(substituted off) 64'
MF	(Argentina) Néstor Rossi
MF	(Argentina) José Ramos	(substituted off) 9'
FW	(Argentina) Héctor Reyes	(substituted off) 46'
FW	(Argentina) José M. Moreno
FW	(Argentina) Alfredo Di Stéfano
FW	(Argentina) Ángel Labruna	(substituted off) 63'
FW	(Argentina) Félix Loustau
Substitutes:
DF	(Argentina) Héctor Ferrari	(substituted on) 9'
FW	(Argentina) Juan C. Muñoz	(substituted on) 46'
FW	(Argentina) Óscar Coll	(substituted on) 63'
MF	(Argentina) Osvaldo Méndez	(substituted on) 64' (red card) 74'
Manager:
(Argentina) José María Minella

18 March

Deportivo Municipal (Peru)	3–1	(Bolivia) Litoral
López 15', 80'; Torres 37'	Report	Capparelli 48'

Estadio Nacional, Santiago
Referee: J. White (Chile)

18 March

River Plate (Argentina)	1–0	(Chile) Colo-Colo
Di Stéfano 61'	Report

Estadio Nacional, Santiago
Referee: L. Fernández (Uruguay)

== Top scorers ==
List of the competition top scorers:

Rank	Player	Club	Goals
1	(Bolivia) Roberto Capparelli	(Bolivia) Litoral	7
2	(Uruguay) Atilio García	(Uruguay) Nacional	5
3	(Argentina) Alfredo Di Stéfano	(Argentina) River Plate	4
3	(Brazil) Albino Friaça	(Brazil) Vasco da Gama	4
3	(Chile) Pedro López	(Chile) Colo-Colo	4
3	(Peru) Máximo Mosquera	(Peru) Deportivo Municipal	4

== Legacy ==
=== Inspiration for the creation of the UEFA Champions League ===
The tournament was the first ever continent-wide club football competition based on the "champions cup" model and intended to determine the club champion of a continental area, and thus was the inspiration for the creation of the European Cup in Europe. In interviews to the Brazilian sports TV programme Globo Esporte in 2015 and Chilean newspaper El Mercúrio in 2018, French journalist Jacques Ferran (recognised by UEFA as one of the founding fathers of the UEFA Champions League, together with Gabriel Hanot) said that the South American Championship of Champions was the inspiration for the European Cup: "How could Europe, which wanted to be ahead of the rest of the world, not be able to accomplish a competition of the same kind of the South American one? We needed to follow that example."

=== Recognition by CONMEBOL as a precursor to Copa Libertadores ===
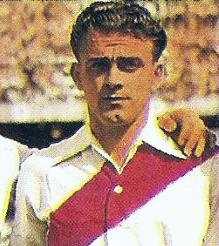
Alfredo Di Stéfano was the most famous footballer at the competition.

Vasco da Gama, though always considered themselves as the first South American club champions, had never asked CONMEBOL for recognition of that honor. However, in 1996 a CONMEBOL book, 30 Años de Pasión y Fiesta (30 Years of Passion and Party) was discovered by Vasco da Gama executives. This book told the story of the Copa Libertadores (played from 1960 on), stating that the tournament of 1948 was its antecedente (predecessor). According to the CONMEBOL Press Release of April 29th, 1996, Vasco da Gama's executives asked CONMEBOL's Executive Committee for the recognition of the aforementioned honor, and the acceptance of Vasco da Gama as a participant at Supercopa Libertadores, then a CONMEBOL competition to which were admitted only the previous Copa Libertadores champions. Supercopa Libertadores' rules, set by CONMEBOL, did not admit the participation of winners of other official CONMEBOL competitions, such as Copa CONMEBOL, but only the winners of Copa Libertadores, so that Vasco da Gama participation in Supercopa, based on its 1948 conquest, would result, in practice, in CONMEBOL entitling equal status to the 1948 championship and the Copa Libertadores.

In April 1996, CONMEBOL's Executive Committee recognised the meaning and importance of the 1948 competition as the precursor to the Copa Libertadores, or a "Libertadores in illo tempore" (though CONMEBOL has not come to regard it as an official CONMEBOL competition), thus Vasco da Gama participated at the 1997 Supercopa Libertadores. As stated by the CONMEBOL Executive Committee, Vasco da Gama's request for Supercopa participation was accepted "in recognition of the sporting achievement and its historical truth" (as written in the 1996 CONMEBOL press release on the aforementioned recognition). In 2014, CONMEBOL website congratulated Vasco da Gama on the club's 116th anniversary, stating: "Vasco won the first tournament of clubs at a continental level in 1948, which would 12 years later become the Copa Libertadores which they won in 1998, coinciding with the centenary of their founding". The 1948 South American Club Championship has been regarded as a precursor to Copa Libertadores, and Vasco da Gama regarded as the 1948 South American club champions, also at the FIFA website.

== See also ==
- Copa Libertadores
