= Djalma (footballer, born 1918) =

Brazilian footballer

Personal information
- Full name: Djalma Bezerra dos Santos
- Date of birth: 19 December 1918
- Place of birth: Recife, Brazil
- Date of death: 3 March 1954 (aged 35)
- Position: Forward

International career
Years	Team	Apps	(Gls)
1945	Brazil	1	(0)

Djalma Bezerra dos Santos (19 December 1918 – 3 March 1954), known as just Djalma, was a Brazilian footballer. He played in one match for the Brazil national football team in 1945. He was also part of Brazil's squad for the 1945 South American Championship.
