= 1950 Campeonato Carioca =

Campeonato Carioca
- Season: 1950
- Champions: Vasco da Gama
- Matches played: 110
- Goals scored: 474 (4.31 per match)
- Top goalscorer: Ademir (Vasco da Gama) – 25 goals
- Biggest home win: Vasco da Gama 9-1 Madureira (October 15, 1950)
- Biggest away win: Fluminense 0-5 Bangu (January 27, 1951)
- Highest scoring: Vasco da Gama 9-1 Madureira (October 15, 1950)

The 1950 edition of the Campeonato Carioca kicked off on August 12, 1950 and ended on January 28, 1951. It was organized by FMF (Federação Metropolitana de Futebol, or Metropolitan Football Federation). Eleven teams participated. Vasco da Gama won the title for the 9th time. no teams were relegated.

== System ==
The tournament would be disputed in a double round-robin format, with the team with the most points winning the title.

== Championship ==
Pos	Team	Pld	W	D	L	GF	GA	GD	Pts	Qualification or relegation
1	Vasco da Gama	20	17	0	3	74	21	+53	34	Champions
2	América	20	14	3	3	52	30	+22	31	
3	Bangu	20	14	2	4	66	24	+42	30	
4	Botafogo	20	13	2	5	41	28	+13	28	
5	Olaria	20	7	5	8	35	39	−4	19	
6	Fluminense	20	7	4	9	41	46	−5	18	
7	Flamengo	20	7	3	10	50	45	+5	17	
8	Madureira	20	5	4	11	34	56	−22	14	
9	Bonsucesso	20	5	2	13	34	64	−30	12	
10	Canto do Rio	20	3	4	13	22	57	−35	10	
11	São Cristóvão	20	2	3	15	25	64	−39	7	

Updated to match(es) played on January 28, 1951. Source: RSSSF.com
Rules for classification: 1) points; 2) goal difference; 3) wins; 4) number of goals scored.

== Top scorers ==
Rank	Player	Club	Goals
1	Ademir	Vasco da Gama	25
2	Durval	Flamengo	16
3	Dimas	America	14
4	Simões	Bangu	13
4	Djair	Vasco da Gama	13
4	Maneca	Vasco da Gama	13
7	Ariosto	Botafogo	12
7	Ipojucan	Vasco da Gama	12
