= 1949 Campeonato Carioca =

Campeonato Carioca
- Season: 1949
- Champions: Vasco da Gama
- Matches played: 110
- Goals scored: 494 (4.49 per match)
- Top goalscorer: Ademir (Vasco da Gama) – 30 goals
- Biggest home win: Vasco da Gama 11-0 São Cristóvão (July 3, 1949)
- Biggest away win: Canto do Rio 0-6 Flamengo (July 10, 1949); São Cristóvão 0-6 Flamengo (July 17, 1949)
- Highest scoring: Vasco da Gama 11-0 São Cristóvão (July 3, 1949)

The 1949 edition of the Campeonato Carioca kicked off on July 3, 1949 and ended on December 11, 1949. It was organized by FMF (Federação Metropolitana de Futebol, or Metropolitan Football Federation). Eleven teams participated. Vasco da Gama won the title for the 8th time. no teams were relegated.

== System ==
The tournament would be disputed in a double round-robin format, with the team with the most points winning the title.

== Championship ==
| Pos | Team | Pld | W | D | L | GF | GA | GD | Pts | Qualification or relegation |
|---|---|---|---|---|---|---|---|---|---|---|
| 1 | Vasco da Gama | 20 | 18 | 2 | 0 | 84 | 24 | +60 | 38 | Champions |
| 2 | Fluminense | 20 | 13 | 5 | 2 | 59 | 32 | +27 | 31 | |
| 3 | Flamengo | 20 | 12 | 3 | 5 | 53 | 28 | +25 | 27 | |
| 4 | Botafogo | 20 | 11 | 4 | 5 | 47 | 21 | +26 | 26 | |
| 5 | Bangu | 20 | 10 | 5 | 5 | 44 | 31 | +13 | 25 | |
| 6 | América | 20 | 9 | 3 | 8 | 52 | 56 | −4 | 21 | |
| 7 | Olaria | 20 | 6 | 5 | 9 | 41 | 46 | −5 | 17 | |
| 8 | Bonsucesso | 20 | 3 | 4 | 13 | 33 | 66 | −33 | 10 | |
| 9 | São Cristóvão | 20 | 3 | 4 | 13 | 24 | 72 | −48 | 10 | |
| 10 | Madureira | 20 | 1 | 6 | 13 | 29 | 46 | −17 | 8 | |
| 11 | Canto do Rio | 20 | 2 | 3 | 15 | 28 | 72 | −44 | 7 | |

Updated to match(es) played on December 11, 1949. Source: RSSSF.com
Rules for classification: 1) points; 2) goal difference; 3) wins; 4) number of goals scored.

== Top Scores ==
| Rank | Player | Club | Goals |
|---|---|---|---|
| 1 | Ademir | Vasco da Gama | 30 |
| 2 | Orlando | Fluminense | 26 |
| 3 | Dimas | America | 18 |
| 4 | Santo Cristo | Fluminense | 14 |
| 4 | Maneca | Vasco da Gama | 14 |
| 6 | Ipojucan | Vasco da Gama | 12 |
| 6 | Gringo | Flamengo | 12 |
| 8 | Maneco | America | 11 |
| 8 | Octávio | Botafogo | 11 |
| 8 | Moacir Bueno | Bangu | 11 |
