= Maneca =

Brazilian footballer

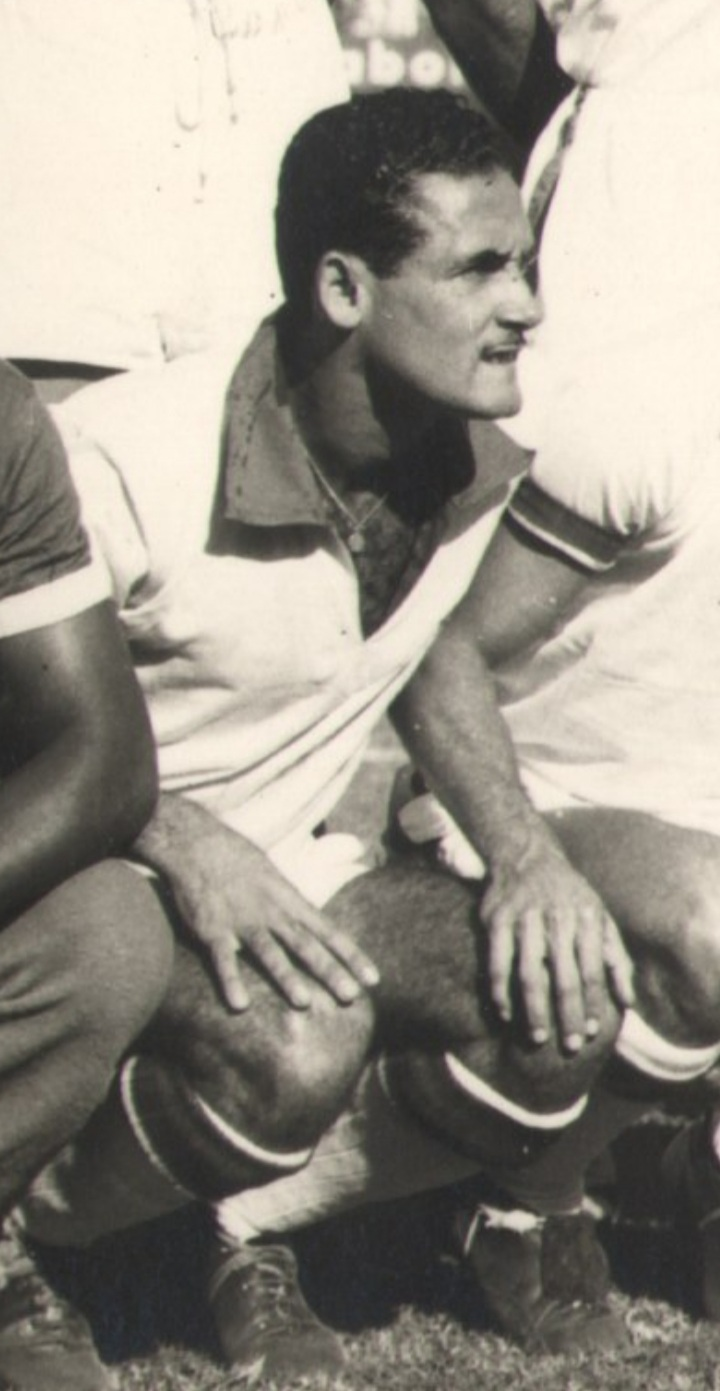
- Maneca with the Brazil national football team in the 1950 FIFA World Cup

Personal information
- Full name: Manuel Marinho Alves
- Date of birth: January 28, 1926
- Place of birth: Brazil
- Date of death: July 14, 1961 (aged 35)
- Position: Forward

Senior career*
Years	Team	Apps	(Gls)
- Galícia
- Vitória
- Vasco da Gama
- Bangu

International career
1950	Brazil	6	(2)
Medal record
Representing Brazil
FIFA World Cup
Runner-up	1950 Brazil
- * Club domestic league appearances and goals

Manuel Marinho Alves, best known as Maneca (January 28, 1926 – July 14, 1961), was an association footballer in striker role. He was born in Salvador Bahia, Brazil.

During his career (1943–1957) he played for Galícia, Vitória, Vasco da Gama and Bangu. He won four Rio de Janeiro State Championships (1947, 1949, 1950 and 1952) and the South American Club Championship of 1948. For Brazilian team he participated in the 1950 FIFA World Cup, playing four games and scoring one goal.

He died on July 14, 1961, after complications from attempted suicide, in his girlfriend's house, on June 28, 1961, by mercury cyanide poisoning.

== Honours ==
Galicia

- Campeonato Baiano: 1943

Vasco da Gama

- Campeonato Carioca: 1947, 1949, 1950, 1952
- Campeonato Sul-Americano de Campeões: 1948
- Torneio Octogonal Rivadavia Correa Meyer: 1953

Bahia

- Campeonato Baiano: 1956

Brazil

- FIFA World Cup runner-up: 1950
