= 1950 FIFA World Cup =

Association football tournament in Brazil

IV Campeonato Mundial de Futebol (Note: The Portuguese pronunciation is [ˈkwaʁtu kɐ̃pi.oˈnatu mũdʒiˈaw dʒi futʃiˈbɔw], in today's standard Brazilian pronunciation.) Brasil 1950 (Brazilian Portuguese)
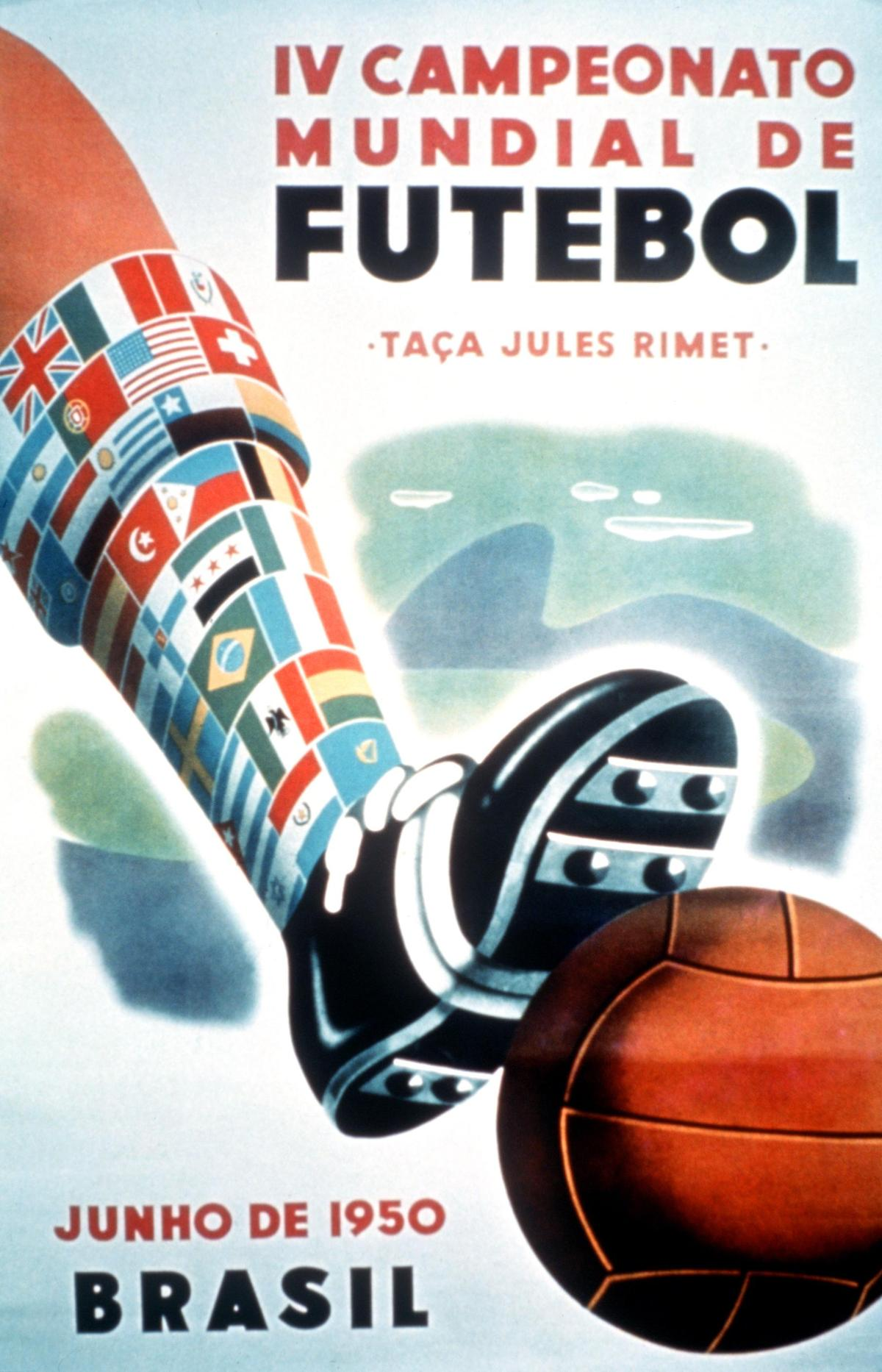
- Official poster

Tournament details
- Host country: Brazil
- Dates: 24 June – 16 July
- Teams: 13 (from 3 confederations)
- Venues: 6 (in 6 host cities)

Final positions
- Champions: Uruguay (2nd title)
- Runners-up: Brazil
- Third place: Sweden
- Fourth place: Spain

Tournament statistics
- Matches played: 22
- Goals scored: 88 (4 per match)
- Attendance: 1,045,246 (47,511 per match)
- Top scorer: (Brazil) Ademir (9 goals)

The 1950 FIFA World Cup was the fourth edition of the FIFA World Cup, the quadrennial international football championship for senior men's national teams. It was held in Brazil from 24 June to 16 July 1950.

It was the first World Cup tournament in 12 years, as the 1942 and 1946 World Cups were cancelled due to World War II. It was also the first World Cup tournament held during the Cold War. Italy, the two-time defending champions, were eliminated in the first round for the first time in history. Uruguay, who had won the inaugural competition in 1930, defeated the host nation, Brazil, in the deciding match of the four-team group of the final round, causing what is sometimes known as one of the biggest upsets in football history, occasionally called the Maracanaço. This was the only tournament not decided by a one-match final. It was also the inaugural tournament where the trophy was referred to as the Jules Rimet Cup, to mark the 25th anniversary of Jules Rimet's presidency of FIFA.

== Host selection ==
Because of World War II, the World Cup had not been staged since 1938; the planned World Cups of 1942 and 1946 were both cancelled. After the war, FIFA were keen to resurrect the competition as soon as possible, and they began making plans for a World Cup tournament to take place. In the aftermath of the war, much of Europe lay in ruins. As a result, FIFA had difficulties finding a country interested in hosting the event, since many governments believed that their scarce resources ought to be devoted to more urgent priorities than a sporting tournament.

The World Cup was at risk of not being held for sheer lack of interest from the international community, until Brazil presented a bid at the 1946 FIFA Congress, offering to host the event on condition that the tournament take place in 1950 rather than the originally proposed year of 1949. Brazil and Germany had been the leading bidders to host the cancelled 1942 World Cup; since both the 1934 and 1938 tournaments had been held in Europe, football historians generally agree that the 1942 event would have most likely been awarded to a South American host country. Brazil's new bid was very similar to the mooted 1942 bid and was quickly accepted.

== Qualification ==
Having secured a host nation, FIFA dedicated some time to persuading countries to send their national teams to compete. Italy was of particular interest as the long-standing defending champions, having won the two previous tournaments in 1934 and 1938; however, Italy's national team was weakened severely as most of its starting line-up perished in the Superga air disaster one year before the start of the tournament. The Italians were eventually persuaded to attend, and travelled by boat rather than by plane.

Brazil (the host country) and Italy (the defending champion) qualified automatically, leaving 14 places remaining. Of these, seven were allocated to Europe, six to the Americas, and one to Asia.

=== Former Axis powers ===
Both Germany (still occupied and partitioned) and Japan (still occupied) were unable to participate. The Japan Football Association (suspended for failure to pay dues in 1945) and the German Football Association (disbanded in 1945 and reorganised in January 1950) were not readmitted to FIFA until September 1950, while the Deutscher Fußball-Verband der DDR in East Germany was not admitted to FIFA until 1952. The French-occupied Saarland had been accepted by FIFA two weeks before the World Cup.

=== United Kingdom nations ===
The Home Nations were invited to take part, having rejoined FIFA four years earlier, after 17 years of self-imposed exile. It was decided to use the 1949–50 British Home Championship as a qualifying group, with the top two teams qualifying. England finished first and Scotland second.

Scotland had qualified for the tournament as runners-up, but the Scottish Football Association declined the place because it had not finished as British Home Championship winners.

=== Teams refusing to participate ===
A number of teams refused to participate in the qualifying tournament, including most nations behind the Iron Curtain, such as the Soviet Union, 1934 finalists Czechoslovakia, and 1938 finalists Hungary. Ultimately, Yugoslavia, which had distanced itself from the Soviet Union in 1948, was the only Eastern European nation to take part in the tournament.

=== Withdrawals during qualification ===
Argentina, Ecuador, and Peru in South America withdrew after the qualifying draw, in Argentina's case because of a dispute with the Brazilian Football Confederation. This meant that Chile, Bolivia, Paraguay, and Uruguay qualified from South America by default. In Asia, the Philippines, Indonesia, and Burma all withdrew, leaving India to qualify by default. In Europe, Austria withdrew, claiming its team was too inexperienced. Belgium also withdrew from the qualification tournament. These withdrawals meant that Switzerland and Turkey qualified without having to play their final round of matches.

=== Qualified teams and withdrawals after qualification ===
The following 16 teams originally qualified for the final tournament:

Asia (0)

- ~~India~~ (withdrew)

Africa (0)

- None qualified

North America (2)

- Mexico
- United States

South America (5)

- Bolivia
- Brazil (hosts)
- Chile
- Paraguay
- Uruguay

Europe (6)

- England (debut)
- ~~France~~ (withdrew)
- Italy (holders)
- ~~Scotland~~ (withdrew)
- Spain
- Sweden
- Switzerland
- ~~Turkey~~ (withdrew)
- Yugoslavia

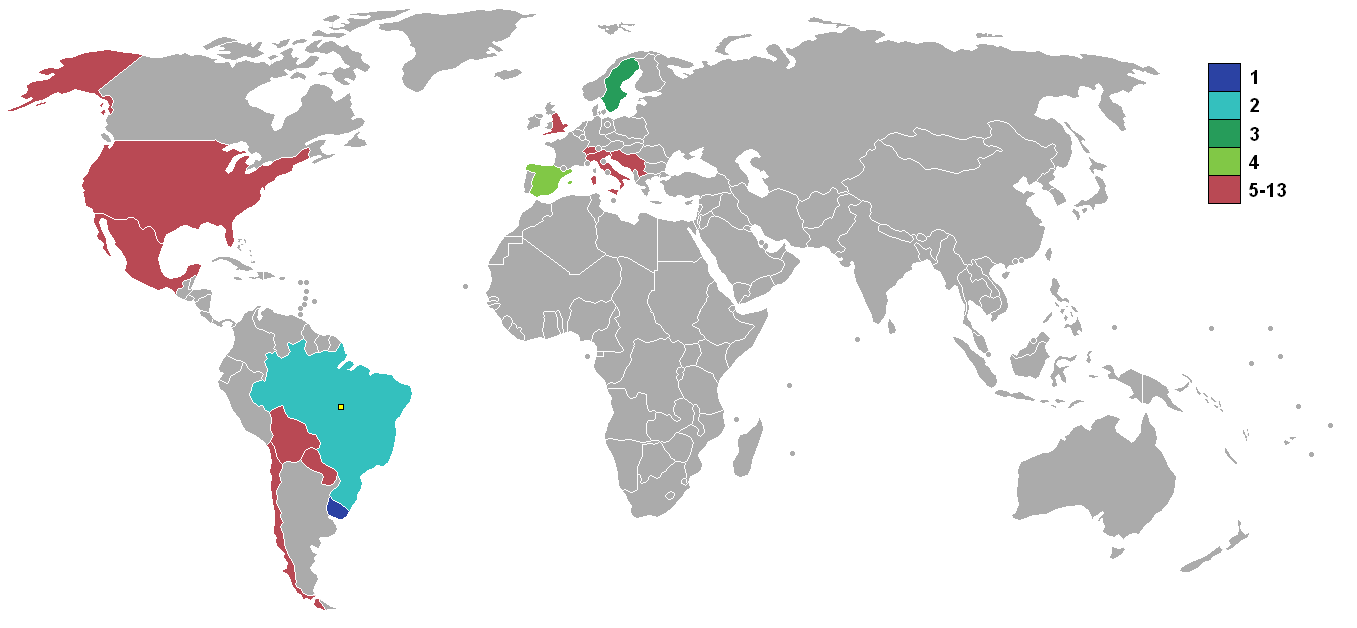
Participating countries after 3 of the 16 qualifying countries withdrew.

Before the qualification competition, George Graham, chairman of the Scottish Football Association (SFA), had said that Scotland would only travel to Brazil as winners of the Home Championship. After Scotland ended up in second place behind England, the Scottish captain George Young, encouraged by England captain Billy Wright, pleaded with the SFA to change its mind and accept the place in Brazil; however, Graham refused to change his position and so Scotland withdrew from the tournament.

Turkey also withdrew, citing financial conditions that included the cost of travelling to South America. FIFA invited Portugal, Republic of Ireland, and France, who had been eliminated in qualifying, to fill the gaps left by Scotland and Turkey. Portugal and Republic of Ireland refused, but France initially accepted and was entered into the draw.

=== Draw and withdrawals after the draw ===
The draw, held in Rio on 22 May 1950, allocated the fifteen remaining teams into four groups:

Group 1	Group 2	Group 3	Group 4
Brazil; Mexico; Yugoslavia; Switzerland	England; Spain; Chile; United States	Sweden; Italy; Paraguay; ~~India~~	Uruguay; ~~France~~; Bolivia

After the draw, the Indian football association, All India Football Federation (AIFF) decided against going to the World Cup, citing travel costs (although FIFA had agreed to bear a major part of the travel expenses), lack of practice time, team selection problems, and valuing the Olympics over the FIFA World Cup. Although FIFA had imposed a rule banning barefoot play following the 1948 Summer Olympics, where India had played barefoot, the Indian captain at the time, Sailen Manna, claimed that this was not part of the AIFF's decision. According to Indian sports journalist Jaydeep Basu, India did not participate because the AIFF did not have confidence in its players.

France also withdrew, citing the amount of travel that would be required between the venues of the Group 4 matches. There was not enough time to invite further replacement teams or to reorganise the groups, so the tournament featured only thirteen teams, with just three nations in Group 3 and two nations in Group 4. France's withdrawal, coupled with Belgium's before qualifying and Romania's elimination, meant that Brazil had become the only team to have played in every World Cup from its inauguration in 1930 to date, a mark that has persisted to the present day.

Of the thirteen teams that competed, only one, England, was making its debut. Several of the teams from the Americas were competing for the first time since the inaugural 1930 tournament, including Uruguay, Mexico, Chile, Paraguay, and Bolivia. Yugoslavia was also making its first appearance since 1930. Spain and the United States qualified for the first time since 1934.

== Format ==
A new playing format was proposed by the Brazilian organisers of the tournament to maximise matches and ticket sales since the stadiums and infrastructure had been so costly. The thirteen teams were divided into four first-round groups (or "pools" as they were then called) of four teams, with the winner of each group advancing to a final group stage, playing in round-robin format to determine the cup winner. A straight knockout tournament, as had been used in 1934 and 1938, would have featured only sixteen games (including the match for third place), while the proposed two rounds of the group format guaranteed thirty games, and thus more ticket revenue. In addition, this format guaranteed each team at least three games, and thus provide more incentive for European teams to make the journey to South America and compete. FIFA originally resisted this proposal, but reconsidered when Brazil threatened to back out of hosting the tournament if this format was not used.

In each group, teams were awarded 2 points for a win and 1 point for a draw. Had there been a tie on points for first place in a group, a playoff would have been held to determine the group winner.

The entire tournament was arranged in such a way that the four first-round groups had no geographical basis. Most teams were obliged to cover large distances to complete their programme. However, Brazil was allowed to play two of its three group matches in Rio de Janeiro while its other group game was held in the relatively nearby city of São Paulo.

== Summary ==
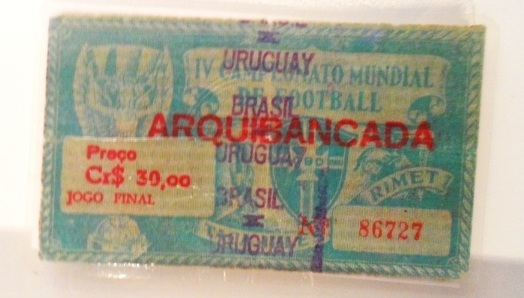
Ticket for the 1950 World Cup's decisive match between Brazil and Uruguay.

A combined Great Britain team had recently beaten the rest of Europe 6–1 in an exhibition match and England went into the competition as one of the favourites; however, they went crashing out after a shock 1–0 defeat by the United States and a 1–0 defeat by Spain. Italy, the defending champions, lost their unbeaten record at the World Cup finals with a 3–2 defeat by Sweden in its opening match and failed to progress to the second round.

The final match in Group 1 between Switzerland and Mexico was the second time a national team did not play in their own kit, the first being 1934 match between Austria and Germany when both teams arrived with white kits, and the Austrians borrowed blue kits from club side Napoli. Both teams arrived with only their red kits, so the Brazilian Football Confederation tossed a coin, with Mexico thus earning the right to play in their own kit, a right they waived as a friendly gesture, allowing the Swiss to wear their own kit while Mexico changed. The local team that lent their shirts was Esporte Clube Cruzeiro from Porto Alegre. The shirts had vertical blue and white stripes.

The opening game of the Maracanã Stadium, shortly before the 1950 FIFA World Cup

The final group stage involved the teams that had won their groups: Brazil, Spain, Sweden, and 1930 FIFA World Cup champions Uruguay, who were making their first World Cup appearance since winning the inaugural tournament. The World Cup winner was the team that finished on top of this group. The final group's six matches were shared between Rio de Janeiro and São Paulo. Brazil played all their final group matches at the Estádio do Maracanã in Rio while the games that did not involve the host nation were played in São Paulo.

Brazil won their first two matches with a 7–1 thrashing of Sweden and 6–1 rout of Spain, putting them on top of the group with one game left to play against Uruguay; in second and only a point behind. Brazil had scored 23 goals in the tournament and only conceded four, and so were strong favourites. The two teams had played three matches against each other in the Copa Río Branco, played in Brazil two months previously, with one match won by Uruguay 4–3 and two by Brazil (2–1 and 1–0), who won the tournament. Thus the difference in quality between the teams was not excessive; unlike Spain and Sweden the Uruguayans were used to the challenges in the big South American stadiums.

On 16 July, before a huge home crowd of 199,954 (some estimated as 205,000) in the Estádio do Maracanã, the host nation only had to draw against Uruguay to win the trophy. After such crushing victories over Spain and Sweden, it looked certain they would take the title, and the home nation duly went ahead in the second minute of the second half, thanks to a goal from Friaça. However, Uruguay equalised and then, with just over 11 minutes left to play, went ahead 2–1 when Alcides Ghiggia squeaked a goal past Moacyr Barbosa, crowning Uruguay as World Cup champions for a second time. This stunning defeat surprised Brazil to the point of shock and is known as the Maracanazo ("Maracanã blow"). Barbosa was blamed for the defeat, for which he suffered for the rest of his life as the failure to win the World Cup at home became part of Brazilian Culture. In 2000, shortly before his death, he said in an interview:

"The maximum punishment in Brazil is 30 years' imprisonment, but I have been paying, for something I am not even responsible for, by now, for 50 years."

The average attendance of nearly 61,000 per game, aided greatly by eight matches (including five featuring hosts Brazil) held in the newly built Maracanã, set a record that was not broken until 1994. Not counting the Maracanã matches, the average attendance was a still-impressive 37,500; however, the only venues that saw crowds comparable to or greater than those in recent World Cups were the Maracanã and São Paulo. Other venues saw considerably smaller crowds.

Antonio Carbajal from Mexico was the last living player from this World Cup. He died in 2023.

== Venues ==
The tournament was played in six venues across six host cities. The stadiums in Belo Horizonte, Curitiba, and the then-capital Rio de Janeiro were built especially for the World Cup. The latter of these, the 200,000-seater Estádio do Maracanã, cost the modern equivalent of $275 million (USD). To make up for its expense, it staged more games at the tournament than any other venue. Among these eight fixtures were all but one of Brazil's six, and included the host's eventually title-deciding final round defeat to Uruguay, which was later dubbed the Maracanazo as a result.

=== Host cities and stadiums ===
Locations of the 1950 FIFA World Cup host cities

List of host cities and stadiums
City	Stadium	Capacity	Image
Belo Horizonte	Estádio Independência	30,000	
Curitiba	Estádio Vila Capanema	10,000	
Porto Alegre	Estádio dos Eucaliptos	20,000	
Recife	Estádio Ilha do Retiro	20,000	
Rio de Janeiro	Estádio do Maracanã	200,000	
São Paulo	Estádio do Pacaembu	60,000	

== Match officials ==
Europe

- (Austria) Alois Beranek
- (England) Arthur Edward Ellis
- (England) George Reader
- (England) Reginald Leafe
- (France) Charles de La Salle
- (Italy) Generoso Dattillo
- (Italy) Giovanni Galeati
- (Netherlands) Karel van der Meer
- (Portugal) José da Costa
- (Scotland) George Mitchell
- (Spain) José Luis García Carrión
- (Spain) Ramón Azón Romá
- (Sweden) Gunnar Dahlner
- (Sweden) Ivan Eklind
- (Switzerland) Jean Lutz
- (Wales) Sandy Griffiths
- (Socialist Federal Republic of Yugoslavia) Leo Lemešić

North America

- (Mexico) Carlos Estévez Tejada
- (United States) Prudencio Garcia

South America

- (Bolivia) Alfredo Álvarez
- (Brazil) Alberto da Gama Malcher
- (Brazil) Mário Gardelli
- (Brazil) Mário Vianna
- (Chile) Sergio Bustamante
- (Paraguay) Cayetano de Nicola
- (Paraguay) Mario Rubén Heyn
- (Uruguay) Esteban Marino

== Group stage ==
=== Group 1 ===
Pos	Team	Pld	W	D	L	GF	GA	GD	Pts	Qualification
1	Brazil	3	2	1	0	8	2	+6	5	Advance to final round
2	Yugoslavia	3	2	0	1	7	3	+4	4	
3	Switzerland	3	1	1	1	4	6	−2	3	
4	Mexico	3	0	0	3	2	10	−8	0	

Source: FIFA
24 June 1950
15:00 BRT (UTC-3)

Brazil	4–0	Mexico
Ademir 30', 79'; Jair 65'; Baltazar 71'

Estádio do Maracanã, Rio de Janeiro
Attendance: 81,649
Referee: George Reader (England)
25 June 1950
15:00 BRT (UTC-3)

Yugoslavia	3–0	Switzerland
Mitić 59'; Tomašević 70'; Ognjanov 84'

Estádio Independência, Belo Horizonte
Attendance: 7,336
Referee: Giovanni Galeati (Italy)

28 June 1950
15:00 BRT (UTC-3)

Brazil	2–2	Switzerland
Alfredo 3'; Baltazar 32'		Fatton 17', 88'

Estádio do Pacaembu, São Paulo
Attendance: 42,032
Referee: Ramón Azón Romá (Spain)
28 June 1950
15:00 BRT (UTC-3)

Yugoslavia	4–1	Mexico
Bobek 20'; Ž. Čajkovski 23', 51'; Tomašević 81'		Ortiz 89' (pen.)

Estádio dos Eucaliptos, Porto Alegre
Attendance: 11,078
Referee: Reginald Leafe (England)

1 July 1950
15:00 BRT (UTC-3)

Brazil	2–0	Yugoslavia
Ademir 4'; Zizinho 69'

Estádio do Maracanã, Rio de Janeiro
Attendance: 142,429
Referee: Benjamin Griffiths (Wales)
2 July 1950
15:40 BRT (UTC-3)

Switzerland	2–1	Mexico
Bader 10'; Antenen 44'		Casarín 89'

Estádio dos Eucaliptos, Porto Alegre
Attendance: 3,580
Referee: Ivan Eklind (Sweden)

=== Group 2 ===
Pos	Team	Pld	W	D	L	GF	GA	GD	Pts	Qualification
1	Spain	3	3	0	0	6	1	+5	6	Advance to final round
2	England	3	1	0	2	2	2	0	2	
2	Chile	3	1	0	2	5	6	−1	2	
2	United States	3	1	0	2	4	8	−4	2	

Source: FIFA
25 June 1950
15:00 BRT (UTC-3)

England	2–0	Chile
Mortensen 39'; Mannion 51'

Estádio do Maracanã, Rio de Janeiro
Attendance: 29,703
Referee: Karel van der Meer (Netherlands)
25 June 1950
15:00 BRT (UTC-3)

Spain	3–1	United States
Igoa 81'; Basora 83'; Zarra 89'		Pariani 17'

Estádio Vila Capanema, Curitiba
Attendance: 9,511
Referee: Mário Vianna (Brazil)

29 June 1950
15:00 BRT (UTC-3)

Spain	2–0	Chile
Basora 17'; Zarra 30'

Estádio do Maracanã, Rio de Janeiro
Attendance: 19,790
Referee: Alberto Malcher (Brazil)
29 June 1950
15:00 BRT (UTC-3)

United States	1–0	England
Gaetjens 38'

Estádio Independência, Belo Horizonte
Attendance: 10,151
Referee: Generoso Dattilo (Italy)

2 July 1950
15:00 BRT (UTC-3)

Spain	1–0	England
Zarra 48'

Estádio do Maracanã, Rio de Janeiro
Attendance: 74,462
Referee: Giovanni Galeati (Italy)
2 July 1950
15:00 BRT (UTC-3)

Chile	5–2	United States
Robledo 16'; Cremaschi 32', 60'; Prieto 54'; Riera 82'		Wallace 47'; Maca 48' (pen.)

Estádio Ilha do Retiro, Recife
Attendance: 8,501
Referee: Mário Gardelli (Brazil)

=== Group 3 ===
India was also drawn into this group, but withdrew before playing.

Pos	Team	Pld	W	D	L	GF	GA	GD	Pts	Qualification
1	Sweden	2	1	1	0	5	4	+1	3	Advance to final round
2	Italy	2	1	0	1	4	3	+1	2	
3	Paraguay	2	0	1	1	2	4	−2	1	
4	India	0	0	0	0	0	0	0	0	Withdrew

Source: FIFA
25 June 1950
15:00 BRT (UTC-3)

Sweden	3–2	Italy
Jeppson 25', 68'; Andersson 33'		Carapellese 7'; Muccinelli 75'

Estádio do Pacaembu, São Paulo
Attendance: 36,502
Referee: Jean Lutz (Switzerland)

29 June 1950
15:30 BRT (UTC-3)

Sweden	2–2	Paraguay
Sundqvist 17'; Palmér 26'		López Fretes 35'; López 74'

Estádio Vila Capanema, Curitiba
Attendance: 7,903
Referee: George Mitchell (Scotland)

2 July 1950
15:00 BRT (UTC-3)

Italy	2–0	Paraguay
Carapellese 12'; Pandolfini 62'

Estádio do Pacaembu, São Paulo
Attendance: 25,811
Referee: Arthur Ellis (England)

=== Group 4 ===
France was also drawn into this group, but withdrew before playing.

Pos	Team	Pld	W	D	L	GF	GA	GD	Pts	Qualification
1	Uruguay	1	1	0	0	8	0	+8	2	Advance to final round
2	Bolivia	1	0	0	1	0	8	−8	0	
3	France	0	0	0	0	0	0	0	0	Withdrew

Source: FIFA
2 July 1950
15:00 BRT (UTC-3)

Uruguay	8–0	Bolivia
Míguez 14', 40', 51'; Vidal 18'; Schiaffino 23', 54'; Pérez 83'; Ghiggia 87'

Estádio Independência, Belo Horizonte
Attendance: 5,284
Referee: George Reader (England)

== Final round ==
Pos	Team	Pld	W	D	L	GF	GA	GD	Pts	Final result
1	Uruguay (C)	3	2	1	0	7	5	+2	5	Champions
2	Brazil	3	2	0	1	14	4	+10	4	Runners-up
3	Sweden	3	1	0	2	6	11	−5	2	Third place
4	Spain	3	0	1	2	4	11	−7	1	

Source: FIFA
(C) Champions
9 July 1950
15:00 BRT (UTC-3)

Uruguay	2–2	Spain
Ghiggia 29'; Varela 73'		Basora 37', 39'

Estádio do Pacaembu, São Paulo
Attendance: 44,802
Referee: Benjamin Griffiths (Wales)
9 July 1950
15:00 BRT (UTC-3)

Brazil	7–1	Sweden
Ademir 17', 36', 52', 58'; Chico 39', 88'; Maneca 85'		Andersson 67' (pen.)

Estádio do Maracanã, Rio de Janeiro
Attendance: 138,886
Referee: Arthur Ellis (England)

13 July 1950
15:00 BRT (UTC-3)

Brazil	6–1	Spain
Ademir 15', 57'; Jair 21'; Chico 31', 55'; Zizinho 67'		Igoa 71'

Estádio do Maracanã, Rio de Janeiro
Attendance: 152,772
Referee: Reginald Leafe (England)
13 July 1950
15:00 BRT (UTC-3)

Uruguay	3–2	Sweden
Ghiggia 39'; Míguez 77', 85'		Palmér 5'; Sundqvist 40'

Estádio do Pacaembu, São Paulo
Attendance: 7,987
Referee: Giovanni Galeati (Italy)

16 July 1950
15:00 BRT (UTC-3)

Sweden	3–1	Spain
Sundqvist 15'; Mellberg 33'; Palmér 80'		Zarra 82'

Estádio do Pacaembu, São Paulo
Attendance: 11,227
Referee: Karel van der Meer (Netherlands)
16 July 1950
15:00 BRT (UTC-3)

Uruguay	2–1	Brazil
Schiaffino 66'; Ghiggia 79'		Friaça 47'

Estádio do Maracanã, Rio de Janeiro
Attendance: 173,850
Referee: George Reader (England)

== Statistics ==
=== Goalscorers ===
With nine goals, Brazil's Ademir was the tournament's top scorer. In total, 88 goals were scored by 47 players.

Alcides Ghiggia of Uruguay became the second player ever to score in every game: György Sárosi of Hungary was the first who scored at least one goal at his every World Cup appearance (1934: 1 match/1 goal, 1938: 4 matches/5 goals), Just Fontaine was the third such player in 1958, and Jairzinho the fourth (and, as of 2025, the last) in 1970.

9 goals

- (Brazil) Ademir

5 goals

- (Uruguay) Óscar Míguez

4 goals

- (Brazil) Chico
- (Spain) Estanislau Basora
- (Spain) Telmo Zarra
- (Uruguay) Alcides Ghiggia

3 goals

- (Sweden) Karl-Erik Palmér
- (Sweden) Stig Sundqvist
- (Uruguay) Juan Alberto Schiaffino

2 goals

- (Brazil) Baltazar
- (Brazil) Jair
- (Brazil) Zizinho
- (Chile) Atilio Cremaschi
- (Italy) Riccardo Carapellese
- (Spain) Silvestre Igoa
- (Sweden) Sune Andersson
- (Sweden) Hasse Jeppson
- (Switzerland) Jacques Fatton
- (Socialist Federal Republic of Yugoslavia) Željko Čajkovski
- (Socialist Federal Republic of Yugoslavia) Kosta Tomašević

1 goal

- (Brazil) Alfredo
- (Brazil) Friaça
- (Brazil) Maneca
- (Chile) Andrés Prieto
- (Chile) George Robledo
- (Chile) Fernando Riera
- (England) Wilf Mannion
- (England) Stan Mortensen
- (Italy) Ermes Muccinelli
- (Italy) Egisto Pandolfini
- (Mexico) Horacio Casarín
- (Mexico) Héctor Ortiz
- (Paraguay) Atilio López
- (Paraguay) César López Fretes
- (Sweden) Bror Mellberg
- (Switzerland) Charles Antenen
- (Switzerland) René Bader
- (United States) Joe Gaetjens
- (United States) Joe Maca
- (United States) Gino Pariani
- (United States) Frank Wallace
- (Uruguay) Julio Pérez
- (Uruguay) Obdulio Varela
- (Uruguay) Ernesto Vidal
- (Socialist Federal Republic of Yugoslavia) Rajko Mitić
- (Socialist Federal Republic of Yugoslavia) Stjepan Bobek
- (Socialist Federal Republic of Yugoslavia) Tihomir Ognjanov

=== Team of the Tournament ===
FIFA selected the following players for the 1950 FIFA World Cup All-Star Team.

Goalkeeper	Defenders	Midfielders	Forwards
(Uruguay) Roque Máspoli	(Sweden) Erik Nilsson (Spain) José Parra Martínez (Uruguay) Víctor Rodríguez Andrade (Uruguay) Obdulio Varela	(Brazil) Bauer	(Brazil) Ademir (Uruguay) Juan Alberto Schiaffino (Uruguay) Alcides Ghiggia (Brazil) Jair da Rosa Pinto (Brazil) Zizinho

=== Tournament ranking ===
In 1986, FIFA published a report that ranked all teams in each World Cup up to and including 1986, based on progress in the competition and overall results. The rankings for the 1950 tournament were as follows:

Per statistical convention in football, matches decided in extra time are counted as wins and losses.

Pos	Grp	Team	Pld	W	D	L	GF	GA	GD	Pts	Final result
1	4	Uruguay	4	3	1	0	15	5	+10	7	Champions
2	1	Brazil (H)	6	4	1	1	22	6	+16	9	Runners-up
3	3	Sweden	5	2	1	2	11	15	−4	5	Third place
4	2	Spain	6	3	1	2	10	12	−2	7	Fourth place
5	1	Yugoslavia	3	2	0	1	7	3	+4	4	Eliminated in group stage
6	1	Switzerland	3	1	1	1	4	6	−2	3	Eliminated in group stage
7	3	Italy	2	1	0	1	4	3	+1	2	Eliminated in group stage
8	2	England	3	1	0	2	2	2	0	2	Eliminated in group stage
9	2	Chile	3	1	0	2	5	6	−1	2	Eliminated in group stage
10	2	United States	3	1	0	2	4	8	−4	2	Eliminated in group stage
11	3	Paraguay	2	0	1	1	2	4	−2	1	Eliminated in group stage
12	1	Mexico	3	0	0	3	2	10	−8	0	Eliminated in group stage
13	4	Bolivia	1	0	0	1	0	8	−8	0	Eliminated in group stage

Source: FIFA
(H) Hosts

== Bibliography ==
- Lisi, Clemente Angelo (2007). A history of the World Cup: 1930–2006. Lanham, MD: Scarecrow Press. ISBN 978-0-8108-5905-0.
