= Copa Río Branco =

- Organising body: (Brazil) CBF (Uruguay) AUF
- Founded: 1931
- Abolished: 1976; 49 years ago
- Region: Brazil; Uruguay
- Number of teams: 2
- Related competitions: Taça Oswaldo Cruz
- Last champions: Brazil (1976)
- Most successful club(s): Brazil (7 titles)

Copa Río Branco (also: Taça Rio Branco) was a national football team's competition set between 1931 and 1976 among the national football teams of Brazil and Uruguay. Brazil won the most competitions with 7 titles.

== History ==
The Copa Río Branco was first contested 1931 in Estádio das Laranjeiras (a historic football stadium of Rio de Janeiro). All other subsequent games have been played in Uruguayan Stadium Estádio Centenario of Montevideo and in Brazilian Stadiums Estádio do Pacaembu of São Paulo and Estádio São Januário of Rio de Janeiro.

Brazil won the cup 7 times and Uruguay won 4 times. Due to a tie in 1967 both nations were declared winners.

== Results ==
List of matches, detailed. Since the 1940 edition, the competition was played in a two-legged format.

- Playoff match (when necessary).
- Difference on points result.

Ed.	Year	Winner	1st. leg	City	2nd. leg	City	Playoff	City	Result (points)
1	1931	Brazil	2–0	Rio de Janeiro	– (Note: Played as single match.)				
2	1932	Brazil	2–0	Montevideo	–				
3	1940	Uruguay	4–3	Rio de Janeiro	1–1	Rio de Janeiro	–		2–1
4	1946	Uruguay	4–3	Montevideo	1–1	Montevideo	–		2–1
5	1947	Brazil	0–0	Montevideo	3–2	Rio de Janeiro	–		2–1
6	1948	Uruguay	1–1	Montevideo	4–2	Montevideo	–		2–1
7	1950	Brazil	3–4	São Paulo	3–2	Rio de Janeiro	1–0	Rio de Janeiro	4–2
8	1967	Brazil (Note: After three matches ended in a tie and also equalled on goal difference, both were declared champions.)	0–0	Montevideo	2–2	Montevideo	1–1	Montevideo	3–3 (3–3 g.d.)
8	1967	Uruguay	0–0	Montevideo	2–2	Montevideo	1–1	Montevideo	3–3 (3–3 g.d.)
9	1968	Brazil	2–0	São Paulo	4–0	Rio de Janeiro	–		4–0
10	1976	Brazil	2–1	Montevideo	2–1	Rio de Janeiro	–		4–0
