= 1945 Campeonato Carioca =

Campeonato Carioca
- Season: 1945
- Champions: Vasco da Gama
- Matches played: 90
- Goals scored: 370 (4.11 per match)
- Top goalscorer: Lelé (Vasco da Gama) – 15 goals
- Biggest home win: Flamengo 10-1 Bonsucesso (October 13, 1945)
- Biggest away win: Bonsucesso 0-9 Vasco da Gama (October 21, 1945)
- Highest scoring: Flamengo 10-1 Bonsucesso (October 13, 1945)

The 1945 edition of the Campeonato Carioca kicked off on July 8, 1945 and ended on November 18, 1945. It was organized by FMF (Federação Metropolitana de Futebol, or Metropolitan Football Federation). Ten teams participated. Vasco da Gama won the title for the 6th time. no teams were relegated.

== System ==
The tournament would be disputed in a double round-robin format, with the team with the most points winning the title.

== Torneio Relâmpago ==
Pos	Team	Pld	W	D	L	GF	GA	GD	Pts	Qualification or relegation
1	América	5	3	2	0	10	5	+5	8	Champions
2	Vasco da Gama	5	3	0	2	13	9	+4	6	
3	São Cristóvão	5	2	1	2	8	9	−1	5	
4	Fluminense	5	1	2	2	8	9	−1	4	
5	Botafogo	5	1	2	2	6	7	−1	4	
6	Flamengo	5	1	1	3	7	13	−6	3	

Updated to match(es) played on April 18, 1945. Source: RSSSF.com
Rules for classification: 1) points; 2) goal difference; 3) wins; 4) number of goals scored.

== Top Scores ==
Rank	Player	Club	Goals
1	Maneco	America	4
2	Massinha	Vasco da Gama	3
2	Elgen	Vasco da Gama	3
2	Simões	Fluminense	3
2	Sylvio Pirillo	Flamengo	3
2	Tião	Flamengo	3

== Torneio Municipal ==
Pos	Team	Pld	W	D	L	GF	GA	GD	Pts	Qualification or relegation
1	Vasco da Gama	9	9	0	0	41	10	+31	18	Champions
2	Fluminense	9	5	2	2	21	18	+3	12	
3	Flamengo	9	5	1	3	33	23	+10	11	
4	Botafogo	9	4	2	3	23	16	+7	10	
5	América	9	3	4	2	26	18	+8	10	
6	Canto do Rio	9	4	1	4	18	11	+7	9	
7	Madureira	9	2	2	5	16	20	−4	6	
8	São Cristóvão	9	2	2	5	16	23	−7	6	
9	Bangu	9	3	0	6	15	36	−21	6	
10	Bonsucesso	9	1	0	8	7	41	−34	2	

Updated to match(es) played on June 24, 1945. Source: RSSSF.com
Rules for classification: 1) points; 2) goal difference; 3) wins; 4) number of goals scored.

== Top Scores ==
Rank	Player	Club	Goals
1	Sylvio Pirillo	Flamengo	15
2	Ademir de Menezes	Vasco da Gama	10
3	Maxwell	América	8
3	Lelé	Vasco da Gama	8
3	Heleno de Freitas	Botafogo	8
6	Jorginho	América	7
6	Geraldino	Fluminense	7
6	Simões	Fluminense	7
6	Octávio	Botafogo	7

== Championship ==
Pos	Team	Pld	W	D	L	GF	GA	GD	Pts	Qualification or relegation
1	Vasco da Gama	18	13	5	0	58	15	+43	31	Champions
2	Botafogo	18	12	3	3	43	14	+29	27	
3	América	18	12	1	5	49	29	+20	25	
4	Flamengo	18	11	3	4	55	26	+29	25	
5	Fluminense	18	8	5	5	37	26	+11	21	
6	São Cristóvão	18	5	4	9	27	37	−10	15 (Note: Madureira lost the points of a tie against São Cristóvão for fielding a ineligible player. the points of the match were awarded to São Cristóvão.)	
7	Canto do Rio	18	5	3	10	29	42	−13	13	
8	Bangu	18	5	1	12	29	57	−28	11	
9	Madureira	18	2	3	13	21	49	−28	6	
10	Bonsucesso	18	3	0	15	22	75	−53	6	

Updated to match(es) played on November 18, 1945. Source: RSSSF.com
Rules for classification: 1) points; 2) goal difference; 3) wins; 4) number of goals scored.

== Top Scores ==
Rank	Player	Club	Goals
1	Lelé	Vasco da Gama	15
2	Ademir de Menezes	Vasco da Gama	13
2	Heleno de Freitas	Botafogo	13
2	Adílson	Flamengo	13
5	China	America	12
5	Zizinho	Flamengo	12
