= 1947 Campeonato Carioca =

Campeonato Carioca
- Season: 1947
- Champions: Vasco da Gama
- Matches played: 110
- Goals scored: 532 (4.84 per match)
- Top goalscorer: Dimas (Vasco da Gama) – 18 goals
- Biggest home win: Vasco da Gama 14-1 Canto do Rio (September 16, 1947)
- Biggest away win: Bonsucesso 1-7 Bangu (November 30, 1947)
- Highest scoring: Vasco da Gama 14-1 Canto do Rio (September 16, 1947)

The 1947 edition of the Campeonato Carioca kicked off on August 3, 1947 and ended on December 28, 1947. It was organized by FMF (Federação Metropolitana de Futebol, or Metropolitan Football Federation). Eleven teams participated. Vasco da Gama won the title for the 7th time. no teams were relegated.

== System ==
The tournament would be disputed in a double round-robin format, with the team with the most points winning the title.

== Torneio Municipal ==
Pos	Team	Pld	W	D	L	GF	GA	GD	Pts	Qualification or relegation
1	Vasco da Gama	10	8	1	1	40	15	+25	17	Champions
2	Botafogo	10	6	2	2	34	11	+23	14	
3	Flamengo	10	6	2	2	24	18	+6	14	
4	Fluminense	10	4	4	2	24	16	+8	12	
5	América	10	5	1	4	30	28	+2	11	
6	São Cristóvão	10	4	2	4	19	14	+5	10	
7	Madureira	10	4	2	4	24	25	−1	10	
8	Canto do Rio	10	4	1	5	20	23	−3	9	
9	Bonsucesso	10	3	1	6	13	28	−15	7	
10	Olaria	10	1	2	7	13	35	−22	4	
11	Bangu	10	1	0	9	17	45	−28	2	

Updated to match(es) played on June 22, 1947. Source: RSSSF.com
Rules for classification: 1) points; 2) goal difference; 3) wins; 4) number of goals scored.

=== Top Scores ===
Rank	Player	Club	Goals
1	Friaça	Vasco da Gama	13
2	Santo Cristo	Botafogo	11
3	Octávio	Botafogo	9
3	Lelé	Vasco da Gama	9
5	Maneca	Vasco da Gama	7
5	Geninho	Botafogo	7
5	Pirillo	Flamengo	7
5	Sa Pinto	Bangu	7

== Championship ==
Pos	Team	Pld	W	D	L	GF	GA	GD	Pts	Qualification or relegation
1	Vasco da Gama	20	17	3	0	68	20	+48	37	Champions
2	Botafogo	20	13	4	3	51	21	+30	30	
3	América	20	14	1	5	54	32	+22	29	
4	Fluminense	20	11	6	3	65	40	+25	28	
5	Flamengo	20	11	4	5	54	38	+16	26	
6	Madureira	20	6	5	9	50	43	+7	17	
7	Olaria	20	6	5	9	42	44	−2	17	
8	Canto do Rio	20	5	2	13	43	87	−44	12	
9	São Cristóvão	20	3	4	13	34	61	−27	10	
10	Bangu	20	4	2	14	45	71	−26	10	
11	Bonsucesso	20	1	2	17	28	77	−49	4	

Updated to match(es) played on December 28, 1947. Source: RSSSF.com
Rules for classification: 1) points; 2) goal difference; 3) wins; 4) number of goals scored.

== Top Scores ==
Rank	Player	Club	Goals
1	Dimas	Vasco da Gama	18
2	Ademir	Fluminense	16
2	Jair	Flamengo	16
2	Durval	Madureira	16
5	Moacir Bueno	Bangu	15
