= Marcos de Mendonça =

Brazilian footballer

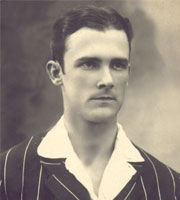

Personal information
- Full name: Marcos Cláudio Phillipe Carneiro de Mendonça
- Date of birth: 25 December 1894
- Place of birth: Cataguases, Brazil
- Date of death: 19 October 1988 (aged 93)
- Place of death: Rio de Janeiro, Brazil
- Height: 1.87 m (6 ft 1 1/2 in)
- Position: Goalkeeper

Senior career*
Years	Team	Apps	(Gls)
1910–1911	Haddock Lobo		
1911–1914	América		
1914–1928	Fluminense	125	(0)

International career
1914–1922	Brazil	10	(0)
Medal record
Men's football
Representing Brazil
South American Championship
Winner	1919 Brazil
Winner	1922 Brazil
Third place	1916 Argentina
- * Club domestic league appearances and goals as of 19:49, 13 June 2009 (UTC)

Marcos Cláudio Phillipe Carneiro de Mendonça (25 December 1894 – 19 October 1988) was a Brazilian footballer who achieved notoriety playing for Fluminense and the Brazil national football team. He was the inaugural goalkeeper for Brazil and played a key role in Brazil's first ever international trophy, the 1919 South American Championship. He made 10 appearances for Brazil between 1914 and 1922.

== Personal life ==
He married the poetess Anna Amélia de Queiroz in 1917 and had four children, among them the theatre critic Bárbara Heliodora.

== Honours ==
América

- Campeonato Carioca: 1913

Fluminense

- Campeonato Carioca: 1917, 1918, 1919

Brazil

- Roca Cup: 1914
- Copa América: 1919, 1922
