= Sidney Pullen =

English footballer (1895–1950s)

Personal information
- Date of birth: 14 July 1895
- Place of birth: Southampton, England
- Date of death: 1 August 1950
- Place of death: Rio de Janeiro, Brazil
- Position: Midfielder

Senior career*
Years	Team	Apps	(Gls)
1910–1914	Paysandu		
1915–1925	Flamengo	116	(49)
- Fluminense

International career
1916–1917	Brazil	3	(0)

Managerial career
- Flamengo
Medal record
Men's football
Representing Brazil
South American Championship
Third place	1916 Argentina
- * Club domestic league appearances and goals

Sidney Pullen (14 July 1895 – 1 August 1950) was a footballer who played as a midfielder. Born in England, he played for the Brazil national team.

At the club level, Pullen began his career at Paysandu, before playing for Rio de Janeiro-based Flamengo. Internationally, he was one of the first foreigners to represent Brazil, taking part in the 1916 South American Championship.

== Biography ==
Born in Southampton, Pullen migrated to Brazil after his father, Hugh Pullen, was transferred to a factory in Rio de Janeiro. When Paysandu closed their football department, he moved to Flamengo, and his father imported from Germany the kit known as coral snake. During World War I, he left Flamengo to fight for England. Sidney Pullen died in the 1950s, in Rio de Janeiro.

== Career ==
Pullen started his career in 1910, defending Paysandu, a Rio de Janeiro team founded by English expatriates, winning the Campeonato Carioca in 1912. After the club closed their football department in 1914, he moved to Flamengo in 1915, where he played 116 matches and scored 40 goals, winning the Campeonato Carioca five times before leaving the club in 1925. He also worked as Flamengo's head coach.

== International career ==
Pullen was the first of only five foreigners to play for the Brazil national team. He played five matches between 1916 and 1917, thereof three 1916 South American Championship matches in July 1916. In 1917 he played for Brazil in two test matches against the club sides Dublin FC from Montevideo and Sportivo Barracas from Buenos Aires.

== Refereeing career ==
Pullen worked as a referee in one match of the 1916 Copa América. The match was played on 6 July, between Argentina and Chile.

== Honours ==
Paysandu

- Campeonato Carioca: 1912

Flamengo

- Campeonato Carioca: 1915, 1920, 1921, 1925
