= Edwin Cox (footballer) =

Brazilian footballer

Personal information
- Full name: Edwin Horácio Cox
- Date of birth: 7 August 1886
- Place of birth: Rio de Janeiro, Brazil
- Date of death: 16 December 1975 (aged 89)
- Place of death: Rio de Janeiro, Brazil
- Position: Forward

Senior career*
Years	Team	Apps	(Gls)
1903–1909	Fluminense	63	(62)
1911	Grêmio	7	(10)
- * Club domestic league appearances and goals as of 14 April 2024

Edwin Horácio Cox (7 August 1886 – 16 December 1975), was a Brazilian footballer who played as a forward.

== Career ==
Edwin Cox played for Fluminense FC from 1903 to 1909, participating in the conquest of four state titles, in addition to the incredible record of 63 appearances and 62 goals, being one of the first great strikers in the club's history. In 1911 he played for Grêmio, and participated in the 10–1 Gre-Nal match, realized on June 18.

== Personal life ==
Edwin Cox is brother of Oscar Cox, one of the Fluminense FC founders.

== Honours ==
Fluminense

- Campeonato Carioca: 1906, 1907, 1908, 1909

Grêmio

- Campeonato Citadino de Porto Alegre: 1911

Individual

- 1908 Campeonato Carioca top scorer: 12 goals
