= 1918 Campeonato Carioca =

Campeonato Carioca
- Season: 1918
- Champions: Fluminense
- Matches: 91
- Goals: 426 (4.68 per match)
- Top goalscorer: Luís Menezes (Botafogo) – 21 goals
- Biggest home win: Botafogo 9-0 Mangueira (July 28, 1918)
- Biggest away win: Carioca 0-7 América (May 12, 1918)
- Highest scoring: Bangu 3-9 Fluminense (April 21, 1918)

The 1918 Campeonato Carioca, the thirteenth edition of that championship, kicked off on April 14, 1918 and ended on January 5, 1919. It was organized by LMDT (Liga Metropolitana de Desportos Terrestres, or Metropolitan Land Sports League). Ten teams participated. Fluminense won the title for the 7th time. No teams were relegated.

== Participating teams ==
Club	Home location	Previous season
América	Tijuca, Rio de Janeiro	2nd
Andarahy	Andaraí, Rio de Janeiro	6th
Bangu	Bangu, Rio de Janeiro	7th
Botafogo	Botafogo, Rio de Janeiro	5th
Carioca	Jardim Botânico, Rio de Janeiro	9th
Flamengo	Flamengo, Rio de Janeiro	3rd
Fluminense	Laranjeiras, Rio de Janeiro	1st
Mangueira	Tijuca, Rio de Janeiro	8th
São Cristóvão	São Cristóvão, Rio de Janeiro	4th
Villa Isabel	Vila Isabel, Rio de Janeiro	10th

== System ==
The tournament would be disputed in a double round-robin format, with the team with the most points winning the title. The team with the fewest points would dispute a playoff against the champions of the second level.

== Championship ==
Pos	Team	Pld	W	D	L	GF	GA	GD	Pts	Qualification or relegation
1	Fluminense	18	13	3	2	52	17	+35	29	Champions
2	Botafogo	18	12	2	4	55	22	+33	26	
3	São Cristóvão	18	12	2	4	49	26	+23	26	
4	Flamengo	18	9	3	6	55	43	+12	21	
5	América	18	9	2	7	53	39	+14	20	
6	Carioca	18	8	0	10	31	50	−19	16	
7	Bangu	18	7	1	10	40	66	−26	15	
8	Andarahy	18	4	5	9	35	39	−4	13	
9	Villa Isabel	18	5	3	10	35	58	−23	13	
10	Mangueira	18	0	1	17	13	58	−45	1	Relegation Playoffs

Updated to match(es) played on January 5, 1919. Source: RSSSF.com
Rules for classification: 1) points; 2) goal difference; 3) wins; 4) number of goals scored.

=== Second-place playoffs ===
The regulation also stipulated that the runners-up of the championship would also receive a trophy. Since São Cristóvão and Botafogo tied in points for that position, they had to dispute a playoff.

6 April 1919

Botafogo	3 – 2	São Cristóvão
Petiot; Luiz Menezes; Joppert		Moura; Renato Vinhaes

Rua Paysandu, Rio de Janeiro
Referee: Carlos Santos

=== Relegation playoffs ===
The last-placed team, Mangueira, would dispute a playoff against Americano, champions of the Second Level. Mangueira won the playoff.

23 February 1919

Mangueira	2 – 1	Americano
Renato; Simas		Queiroz

Campo do Jardim Zoológico, Rio de Janeiro
Referee: R.L. Todd
