= 1922 Campeonato Carioca =

Campeonato Carioca
- Season: 1922
- Champions: América
- Matches: 85
- Goals: 311 (3.66 per match)
- Top goalscorer: Braz de Oliveira (Carioca) – 15 goals
- Biggest home win: Fluminense 6-0 Andarahy (July 2, 1922)
- Biggest away win: Palmeiras 0-5 Vasco da Gama (July 23, 1922)
- Highest scoring: Vasco da Gama 8-3 Carioca (July 16, 1922)

The 1922 Campeonato Carioca, the seventeenth edition of that championship, kicked off on April 2, 1922 and ended on November 5, 1922. It was organized by LMDT (Liga Metropolitana de Desportos Terrestres, or Metropolitan Land Sports League). Fourteen teams participated. América won the title for the 3rd time. No teams were relegated.

== Participating teams ==
Club	Home location	Previous season
América	Tijuca, Rio de Janeiro	2nd
Americano	Engenho de Dentro, Rio de Janeiro	13th
Andarahy	Andaraí, Rio de Janeiro	4th
Bangu	Bangu, Rio de Janeiro	3rd
Botafogo	Botafogo, Rio de Janeiro	5th
Carioca	Jardim Botânico, Rio de Janeiro	9th
Flamengo	Flamengo, Rio de Janeiro	1st
Fluminense	Laranjeiras, Rio de Janeiro	7th
Mackenzie	Méier, Rio de Janeiro	12th
Mangueira	Tijuca, Rio de Janeiro	11th
Palmeiras	São Cristóvão, Rio de Janeiro	14th
São Cristóvão	São Cristóvão, Rio de Janeiro	6th
Vasco da Gama	São Cristóvão, Rio de Janeiro	10th
Villa Isabel	Vila Isabel, Rio de Janeiro	8th

== System ==
The tournament would be disputed in two stages:

- First stage: The fourteen teams would be divided into two groups of seven: Série A, with the teams that had finished from 1st to 7th in the previous year's championship, and Série B, with those that had finished from 8th to 14th. The teams in each group played each other in a double round-robin format. The champions of Série A and Série B would qualify into the Finals, while the last-placed team in Série B would dispute a playoff against the champions of the Second Level.
- Final stage: However, before the Finals, the champions of Série B would have to play against the last-placed team of Série A. If they won that match, they qualified for the Finals while the other team would be relegated to the Série B. In case of any other result, the Série A champions would win the title automatically, and no relegation or promotion across groups would take place.

== Championship ==
=== Série A ===
Pos	Team	Pld	W	D	L	GF	GA	GD	Pts	Qualification or relegation
1	América	12	9	1	2	19	7	+12	18 (Note: América lost the points of a tie against Fluminense after that match was annulled and América refused to play a rematch.)	Qualified to Finals
2	Flamengo	12	7	3	2	24	11	+13	17	
3	Fluminense	12	6	3	3	24	12	+12	16	
4	Botafogo	12	6	3	3	21	13	+8	15	
5	Bangu	12	3	2	7	22	29	−7	8	
6	Andarahy	12	2	3	7	17	36	−19	7	
7	São Cristóvão	12	0	3	9	11	30	−19	3	Qualifying Match for Finals

Updated to match(es) played on July 23, 1922. Source: RSSSF.com
Rules for classification: 1) points; 2) goal difference; 3) wins; 4) number of goals scored.

=== Série B ===
Pos	Team	Pld	W	D	L	GF	GA	GD	Pts	Qualification or relegation
1	Vasco da Gama	12	10	1	1	36	10	+26	21	Qualifying Match for Finals
2	Villa Isabel	12	10	0	2	26	11	+15	20	
3	Americano	12	6	2	4	26	23	+3	14	
4	Carioca	12	5	2	5	26	34	−8	12	
5	Palmeiras	12	1	5	6	18	35	−17	7	
6	Mangueira	12	2	2	8	24	33	−9	6	
7	Mackenzie	12	0	4	8	17	27	−10	4	

Updated to match(es) played on July 23, 1922. Source: RSSSF.com
Rules for classification: 1) points; 2) goal difference; 3) wins; 4) number of goals scored.

=== Final phase ===
5 November 1922

Vasco da Gama	0 – 0	São Cristóvão

Rua General Severiano, Rio de Janeiro
Referee: Affonso de Castro

Vasco da Gama eliminated; América declared champions

=== Final standings ===
Pos	Team	Pld	W	D	L	GF	GA	GD	Pts	Qualification or relegation
1	América	12	9	0	3	19	7	+12	18	Champions
2	Flamengo	12	7	3	2	24	11	+13	17	
3	Fluminense	12	7	2	3	24	12	+12	16	
4	Botafogo	12	6	3	3	21	13	+8	15	
5	Bangu	12	3	2	7	22	29	−7	8	
6	Andarahy	12	2	3	7	17	36	−19	7	
7	São Cristóvão	12	0	3	9	11	30	−19	3	
8	Vasco da Gama	12	10	1	1	36	10	+26	21	
9	Villa Isabel	12	10	0	2	26	11	+15	20	
10	Americano	12	6	2	4	26	23	+3	14	
11	Carioca	12	5	2	5	26	34	−8	12	
12	Palmeiras	12	1	5	6	18	35	−17	7	
13	Mangueira	12	2	2	8	24	33	−9	6	
14	Mackenzie	12	0	4	8	7	27	−20	4	

Updated to match(es) played on November 5, 1922. Source: RSSSF.com
Rules for classification: 1) points; 2) goal difference; 3) wins; 4) number of goals scored.

=== Relegation playoffs ===
Originally, a playoff would be held between Mackenzie, the last-placed team in Série B and River, the champions of the Second Level. However, LMDT decided to expand the championship to 16 teams for 1923, eliminating the need for a playoff.
