= 1911 Campeonato Carioca =

Campeonato Carioca
- Season: 1911
- Champions: Fluminense
- Matches: 19
- Goals: 76 (4 per match)
- Top goalscorer: James Calvert (Fluminense) – 7 goals
- Biggest home win: Fluminense 5-0 Rio Cricket (September 10, 1911)
- Biggest away win: Rio Cricket 0-5 Fluminense (June 11, 1911)
- Highest scoring: Rio Cricket 3-3 América (May 28, 1911); Paysandu 2-4 América (July 2, 1911)

The 1911 Campeonato Carioca, the sixth edition of that championship, kicked off on May 7, 1911 and ended on October 22, 1911. It was organized by LMSA (Liga Metropolitana de Sports Athleticos, or Metropolitan Athletic Sports League). Nine teams participated. Fluminense won the title for the 5th time. No teams were relegated.

== Participating teams ==
Club	Home location	Previous season
América	Tijuca, Rio de Janeiro	3rd
Bangu	Bangu, Rio de Janeiro	–
Botafogo	Botafogo, Rio de Janeiro	1st
Fluminense	Laranjeiras, Rio de Janeiro	2nd
Mangueira	Tijuca, Rio de Janeiro	–
Paysandu	Flamengo, Rio de Janeiro	–
Riachuelo	Riachuelo, Rio de Janeiro	4th
Rio Cricket	Praia Grande, Niterói	5th
São Cristóvão	São Cristóvão, Rio de Janeiro	–

== System ==
The tournament would be disputed in a double round-robin format, with the team with the most points winning the title. The team with the fewest points would be relegated.

== Championship ==
=== Qualifying tournament ===
==== First round ====
2 April 1911 First round	Paysandu	5 – 2	Mangueira	Rua Guanabara, Rio de Janeiro
	Gillan; Harry Robinson; Sidney Pullen		Riemer; Regga

9 April 1911 First round	São Cristóvão	2 – 2	Bangu	Rua Voluntários da Pátria, Rio de Janeiro
	Camarinha; Leonel Neves		Loth; John Hellowell

13 April 1911 Replay	São Cristóvão	2 – 0	Bangu	Rua Guanabara, Rio de Janeiro
	João Cantuária; Camarinha

==== Finals ====
16 April 1911 Final	Paysandu	4 – 0	São Cristóvão	Rua Guanabara, Rio de Janeiro
	Harry Robinson; Jack; Gillan

=== Championship ===
Pos	Team	Pld	W	D	L	GF	GA	GD	Pts	Qualification or relegation
1	Fluminense	7	7	0	0	21	1	+20	14	Champions
2	América	7	3	2	2	14	14	0	8	
3	Rio Cricket	7	1	1	5	9	22	−13	3	
4	Paysandu	7	1	0	6	7	21	−14	2	
5	Botafogo	4	2	1	1	8	1	+7	5 (Note: Botafogo retired from the league in protest to the penalties imposed on their players after a brawl in their match against América.)	Withdrew
6	Riachuelo	0	0	0	0	0	0	0	0	Folded

Updated to match(es) played on October 22, 1911. Source: RSSSF.com
Rules for classification: 1) points; 2) goal difference; 3) wins; 4) number of goals scored.
