= 1917 Campeonato Carioca =

Campeonato Carioca
- Season: 1917
- Champions: Fluminense
- Matches: 89
- Goals: 396 (4.45 per match)
- Top goalscorer: Luís Menezes (Botafogo) – 16 goals
- Biggest home win: Fluminense 11-1 Bangu (December 9, 1917)
- Biggest away win: Botafogo 2-7 América (June 10, 1917); Villa Isabel 0-5 Andarahy (September 9, 1917); Andarahy 2-7 Fluminense (December 30, 1917)
- Highest scoring: Fluminense 11-1 Bangu (December 9, 1917)

The 1917 Campeonato Carioca, was the twelfth edition of the namesake championship, initiated on May 20, 1917 and ending on February 24, 1918. It was organized by the LMDT (Liga Metropolitana de Desportos Terrestres, or Metropolitan Land Sports League). Ten teams participated. The Fluminense Football Club won the title for their 6th time. No teams were relegated.

== Participating teams ==
Club	Home location	Previous season
América	Tijuca, Rio de Janeiro	1st
Andarahy	Andaraí, Rio de Janeiro	6th
Bangu	Bangu, Rio de Janeiro	3rd
Botafogo	Botafogo, Rio de Janeiro	2nd
Carioca	Jardim Botânico, Rio de Janeiro	1st (Second level)
Flamengo	Flamengo, Rio de Janeiro	4th
Fluminense	Laranjeiras, Rio de Janeiro	5th
Mangueira	Tijuca, Rio de Janeiro	3rd (Second level)
São Cristóvão	São Cristóvão, Rio de Janeiro	7th
Villa Isabel	Vila Isabel, Rio de Janeiro	2nd (Second level)

== System ==
The tournament was played in a double round-robin format, with the team with the most points winning the title. The team with the fewest points would play in a playoff against the champions of the second level.

== Championship ==
Pos	Team	Pld	W	D	L	GF	GA	GD	Pts	Qualification or relegation
1	Fluminense	18	14	2	2	58	21	+37	30	Champions
2	América	18	13	2	3	52	23	+29	28	
3	Flamengo	18	12	2	4	44	25	+19	26	
4	São Cristóvão	18	12	1	5	58	37	+21	25	
5	Botafogo	18	11	0	7	56	48	+8	22	
6	Andarahy	18	8	3	7	36	32	+4	19	
7	Bangu	18	5	1	12	27	57	−30	11	
8	Mangueira	18	2	4	12	14	42	−28	8	
9	Carioca	18	2	3	13	25	55	−30	7	
10	Villa Isabel	18	1	2	15	21	54	−33	4	Relegation Playoffs

Updated to match(es) played on February 28, 1918. Source: RSSSF.com
Rules for classification: 1) points; 2) goal difference; 3) wins; 4) number of goals scored.

=== Relegation playoffs ===
The last-placed team, Villa Isabel, played in a playoff against Cattete, the champions of the Second Level. Villa Isabel won the playoff.

24 February 1918

Villa Isabel	5 – 0	Cattete
Brandão; Cecy; Othon

Rua General Severiano, Rio de Janeiro
Referee: Rubens Portcarrero
