= 1927 Campeonato Carioca =

Campeonato Carioca
- Season: 1927
- Champions: Flamengo
- Matches played: 90
- Goals scored: 468 (5.2 per match)
- Top goalscorer: Nilo (Botafogo) – 30 goals
- Biggest home win: Vasco da Gama 11-0 Brasil (May 1, 1927)
- Biggest away win: Flamengo 2-9 Botafogo (May 29, 1927)
- Highest scoring: Vasco da Gama 11-0 Brasil (May 1, 1927); Bangu 4-7 Fluminense (May 22, 1927); Flamengo 2-9 Botafogo (May 29, 1927); Bangu 8-3 Brasil (June 19, 1927); Villa Isabel 4-7 Botafogo (September 4, 1927)

The 1927 Campeonato Carioca, the 22nd edition of that championship, kicked off on May 1, 1927 and ended on September 18, 1927. It was organized by AMEA (Associação Metropolitana de Esportes Atléticos, or Metropolitan Athletic Sports Association). Ten teams participated. Flamengo won the title for the 6th time. No teams were relegated.

== Participating teams ==
Before the start of the championship, Syrio e Libanez was suspended by AMEA for not having a stadium of its own (the team usually groundshared with Mangueira instead), and was replaced by Andarahy, that after being passed over for promotion in 1925, hadn't even disputed the Second level in 1926.

Club	Home location	Previous season
América	Tijuca, Rio de Janeiro	8th
Andarahy	Andaraí, Rio de Janeiro	–
Bangu	Bangu, Rio de Janeiro	4th
Botafogo	Botafogo, Rio de Janeiro	6th
Brasil	Urca, Rio de Janeiro	10th
Flamengo	Flamengo, Rio de Janeiro	5th
Fluminense	Laranjeiras, Rio de Janeiro	3rd
São Cristóvão	São Cristóvão, Rio de Janeiro	1st
Vasco da Gama	São Cristóvão, Rio de Janeiro	2nd
Villa Isabel	Vila Isabel, Rio de Janeiro	9th

== System ==
The tournament would be disputed in a double round-robin format, with the team with the most points winning the title.

== Championship ==
Pos	Team	Pld	W	D	L	GF	GA	GD	Pts	Qualification or relegation
1	Flamengo	18	13	2	3	47	32	+15	28	Champions
2	Fluminense	18	11	5	2	52	26	+26	27	
3	América	18	11	3	4	51	27	+24	25	
4	Vasco da Gama	18	10	4	4	53	29	+24	24	
5	Botafogo	18	9	6	3	67	43	+24	24	
6	São Cristóvão	18	8	5	5	51	30	+21	21	
7	Bangu	18	5	3	10	54	64	−10	13	
8	Andarahy	18	4	2	12	38	63	−25	10	
9	Brasil	18	1	4	13	27	74	−47	6	
10	Villa Isabel	18	0	2	16	28	80	−52	2	

Updated to match(es) played on September 18, 1927. Source: RSSSF.com
Rules for classification: 1) points; 2) goal difference; 3) wins; 4) number of goals scored.
