= 1907 Campeonato Carioca =

Campeonato Carioca
- Season: 1907
- Champions: Botafogo; Fluminense
- Matches: 10
- Goals: 38 (3.8 per match)
- Top goalscorer: Flávio Ramos (Botafogo) – 6 goals
- Biggest home win: Fluminense 3-0 Botafogo (June 2, 1907)
- Biggest away win: Internacional 0-5 Fluminense (May 5, 1907)
- Highest scoring: Botafogo 5-3 Paysandu (June 16, 1907)

The 1907 Campeonato Carioca, the second edition of that championship, kicked off on May 5, 1907 and ended on October 27, 1907. It was organized by LMSA (Liga Metropolitana de Sports Athleticos, or Metropolitan Athletic Sports League). Four teams participated. Botafogo and Fluminense won the title for the 1st time and 2nd time, respectively. No teams were relegated.

== Participating teams ==
Club	Home location	Previous season
Botafogo	Botafogo, Rio de Janeiro	4th
Fluminense	Laranjeiras, Rio de Janeiro	1st
Internacional	Andaraí, Rio de Janeiro	6th
Paissandu	Flamengo, Rio de Janeiro	2nd

== System ==
The tournament would be disputed in a double round-robin format, with the team with the most points winning the title.

== Championship ==
The championship would be disputed by four clubs instead of the previous year's six, as Bangu and Rio Cricket declined to participate, although they were still affiliated to the league. In addition to that, early in the year, Football & Athletic changed its name to Internacional.

After not showing up to a match against Botafogo, Internacional was expelled from the league, Fluminense, Paysandu and Rio Cricket also left the league in solidarity, effectively disbanding it. At the time, Botafogo and Fluminense were tied in points, and since the tiebreaking criteria were unclear, the title went officially unawarded until 1996, when FFERJ declared both of them Carioca champions of 1907.

Pos	Team	Pld	W	D	L	GF	GA	GD	Pts	Qualification or relegation
1	Fluminense	6	5	0	1	15	5	+10	10	Champions
2	Botafogo	6	5	0	1	14	9	+5	10	Champions
3	Internacional	6	1	0	5	2	9	−7	2	Expelled
4	Paysandu	6	1	0	5	7	15	−8	2	

Updated to match(es) played on October 27, 1907. Source: RSSSF.com
Rules for classification: 1) points; 2) goal difference; 3) wins; 4) number of goals scored.
