= 1930 Campeonato Carioca =

Campeonato Carioca
- Season: 1930
- Champions: Botafogo
- Matches: 110
- Goals: 448 (4.07 per match)
- Top goalscorer: Ladislau da Guia (Bangu) Preguinho (Fluminense) – 20 goals
- Biggest home win: Vasco da Gama 6-0 Fluminense (November 9, 1930)
- Biggest away win: Brasil 1-11 Flamengo (May 25, 1930)
- Highest scoring: Brasil 1-11 Flamengo (May 25, 1930)

The 1930 Campeonato Carioca, the 25th edition of that championship, kicked off on April 6, 1930 and ended on December 28, 1930. It was organized by AMEA (Associação Metropolitana de Esportes Atléticos, or Metropolitan Athletic Sports Association). Eleven teams participated. Botafogo won the title for the 4th time. No teams were relegated.

== Participating teams ==
| Club | Home location | Previous season |
|---|---|---|
| América | Tijuca, Rio de Janeiro | 2nd |
| Andarahy | Andaraí, Rio de Janeiro | 8th |
| Bangu | Bangu, Rio de Janeiro | 5th |
| Bonsucesso | Bonsucesso, Rio de Janeiro | 7th |
| Botafogo | Botafogo, Rio de Janeiro | 6th |
| Brasil | Urca, Rio de Janeiro | 11th |
| Flamengo | Flamengo, Rio de Janeiro | 10th |
| Fluminense | Laranjeiras, Rio de Janeiro | 4th |
| São Cristóvão | São Cristóvão, Rio de Janeiro | 3rd |
| Syrio e Libanez | Tijuca, Rio de Janeiro | 9th |
| Vasco da Gama | São Cristóvão, Rio de Janeiro | 1st |

== System ==
The tournament would be disputed in a double round-robin format, with the team with the most points winning the title.

== Championship ==
| Pos | Team | Pld | W | D | L | GF | GA | GD | Pts | Qualification or relegation |
|---|---|---|---|---|---|---|---|---|---|---|
| 1 | Botafogo | 20 | 15 | 2 | 3 | 60 | 30 | +30 | 32 | Champions |
| 2 | Vasco da Gama | 20 | 14 | 3 | 3 | 42 | 16 | +26 | 31 | |
| 3 | América | 20 | 11 | 5 | 4 | 47 | 33 | +14 | 27 | |
| 4 | Bangu | 20 | 12 | 2 | 6 | 55 | 33 | +22 | 26 | |
| 5 | São Cristóvão | 20 | 12 | 2 | 6 | 48 | 33 | +15 | 26 | |
| 6 | Fluminense | 20 | 10 | 3 | 7 | 39 | 36 | +3 | 23 | |
| 7 | Syrio e Libanez | 20 | 7 | 2 | 11 | 37 | 46 | −9 | 16 | Left the league after the end of the season |
| 8 | Flamengo | 20 | 6 | 0 | 14 | 37 | 41 | −4 | 12 | |
| 9 | Bonsucesso | 20 | 3 | 4 | 13 | 31 | 51 | −20 | 10 | |
| 10 | Andarahy | 20 | 3 | 3 | 14 | 27 | 53 | −26 | 9 | |
| 11 | Brasil | 20 | 3 | 2 | 15 | 25 | 78 | −53 | 8 | |

Updated to match(es) played on December 28, 1930. Source: RSSSF.com
Rules for classification: 1) points; 2) goal difference; 3) wins; 4) number of goals scored.
