= 1919 Campeonato Carioca =

Campeonato Carioca
- Season: 1919
- Champions: Fluminense
- Relegated: Carioca
- Matches: 91
- Goals: 402 (4.42 per match)
- Top goalscorer: Braz de Oliveira (São Cristóvão) – 24 goals
- Biggest home win: São Cristóvão 11-1 Mangueira (June 29, 1919)
- Biggest away win: Mangueira 0-8 Fluminense (June 22, 1919)
- Highest scoring: São Cristóvão 11-1 Mangueira (June 29, 1919)

The 1919 Campeonato Carioca, the fourteenth edition of the annual football championship of the state of Rio de Janeiro, Brazil, kicked off on June 8, 1919 and ended on January 6, 1920. It was organized by LMDT (Liga Metropolitana de Desportos Terrestres, or Metropolitan Land Sports League). Ten teams participated. Fluminense won the title for the 8th time. Carioca was relegated.

== Participating teams ==
Club	Home location	Previous season
América	Tijuca, Rio de Janeiro	5th
Andarahy	Andaraí, Rio de Janeiro	8th
Bangu	Bangu, Rio de Janeiro	7th
Botafogo	Botafogo, Rio de Janeiro	2nd
Carioca	Jardim Botânico, Rio de Janeiro	6th
Flamengo	Flamengo, Rio de Janeiro	4th
Fluminense	Laranjeiras, Rio de Janeiro	1st
Mangueira	Tijuca, Rio de Janeiro	10th
São Cristóvão	São Cristóvão, Rio de Janeiro	3rd
Villa Isabel	Vila Isabel, Rio de Janeiro	9th

== System ==
The tournament would be disputed in a double round-robin format, with the team with the most points winning the title. The team with the fewest points would dispute a playoff against the champions of the second level.

== Championship ==
Pos	Team	Pld	W	D	L	GF	GA	GD	Pts	Qualification or relegation
1	Fluminense	18	17	0	1	68	19	+49	34	Champions
2	Flamengo	18	13	2	3	51	21	+30	28	
3	Botafogo	18	11	2	5	51	33	+18	24	
4	São Cristóvão	18	9	5	4	48	26	+22	23	
5	Bangu	18	8	0	10	24	38	−14	16	
6	América	18	7	1	10	42	38	+4	15	
7	Villa Isabel	18	6	2	10	35	47	−12	14	
8	Andarahy	18	5	2	11	27	40	−13	12	
9	Mangueira	18	3	3	12	21	66	−45	9	
10	Carioca	18	1	3	14	24	63	−39	5	Relegation Playoffs

Updated to match(es) played on January 6, 1920. Source: RSSSF.com
Rules for classification: 1) points; 2) goal difference; 3) wins; 4) number of goals scored.

=== Relegation playoffs ===
The last-placed team, Carioca, would dispute a playoff against Palmeiras, champions of the Second Level. Carioca won the first match by 4-1, but the league annulled the match after it was found that Carioca had fielded two ineligible players. A rematch was held in March 1920, which ended with Palmeiras winning by 4-2 and being promoted to the first level.

11 January 1920

Carioca	4 – 1	Palmeiras
Chiccarino II; Henrique	Match annulled	Nicanor Bahiano

Laranjeiras, Rio de Janeiro
Referee: Antônio Miranda
21 March 1920

Palmeiras	4 – 2	Carioca
Gonçalo; Nicanor Bahiano; Júlio		Mário; Gradim

Rua Campos Salles, Rio de Janeiro
Referee: Henrique Vignal
