= 1920 Campeonato Carioca =

Campeonato Carioca
- Season: 1920
- Champions: Flamengo
- Matches: 89
- Goals: 400 (4.49 per match)
- Top goalscorer: Arlindo (Botafogo); Claudionor (Bangu) – 18 goals
- Biggest home win: Bangu 9-0 Villa Isabel (June 20, 1920)
- Biggest away win: Palmeiras 1-7 Fluminense (May 9, 1920); Mangueira 0-6 Botafogo (August 8, 1920)
- Highest scoring: São Cristóvão 9-4 Villa Isabel (August 8, 1920)

The 1920 Campeonato Carioca, the fifteenth edition of that championship, kicked off on April 11, 1920, and ended on January 2, 1921. It was organized by LMDT (Liga Metropolitana de Desportos Terrestres, or Metropolitan Land Sports League). Ten teams participated. Flamengo won the title for the 3rd time. No teams were relegated.

== Participating teams ==
Club	Home location	Previous season
América	Tijuca, Rio de Janeiro	6th
Andarahy	Andaraí, Rio de Janeiro	8th
Bangu	Bangu, Rio de Janeiro	5th
Botafogo	Botafogo, Rio de Janeiro	3rd
Flamengo	Flamengo, Rio de Janeiro	2nd
Fluminense	Laranjeiras, Rio de Janeiro	1st
Mangueira	Tijuca, Rio de Janeiro	9th
Palmeiras	São Cristóvão, Rio de Janeiro	1st (Second level)
São Cristóvão	São Cristóvão, Rio de Janeiro	4th
Villa Isabel	Vila Isabel, Rio de Janeiro	7th

== System ==
The tournament would be disputed in a double round-robin format, with the team with the most points winning the title.

== Championship ==
Pos	Team	Pld	W	D	L	GF	GA	GD	Pts	Qualification or relegation
1	Flamengo	18	13	5	0	44	19	+25	31	Champions
2	Fluminense	18	11	4	3	46	27	+19	26	
3	América	18	10	5	3	39	24	+15	25	
4	Botafogo	18	10	1	7	56	34	+22	21	
5	Andarahy	18	9	2	7	36	26	+10	20	
6	Bangu	18	8	1	9	51	42	+9	17	
7	São Cristóvão	18	8	1	9	49	37	+12	15 (Note: Villa Isabel won the points of a 3-2 loss against São Cristóvão due to the latter having used ineligible players)	
8	Villa Isabel	18	4	1	13	31	53	−22	11	1921 Série B
9	Palmeiras	18	3	2	13	24	64	−40	8	1921 Série B
10	Mangueira	18	3	0	15	24	74	−50	6	1921 Série B

Updated to match(es) played on January 2, 1921. Source: RSSSF.com
Rules for classification: 1) points; 2) goal difference; 3) wins; 4) number of goals scored.
