= Armindo Nobs Ferreira =

Brazilian football manager

Armindo Nobs Ferreira (? - 7 February 1947) is a former Brazilian association football coach.

In mid 1933 he succeeded Victor Guisard as coach of Botafogo FC of Rio de Janeiro. With the club he won in 1933 and 1934 the Championships of the AMEA, the amateur football association of the then national Brazilian capital, after the professional clubs have split off.

Between September 1934 and February 1935 he managed as successor of Luiz Vinhaes the Brazil national football team. During his reign, Brazil played thirteen matches, winning twelve and losing one. However, all of these matches were friendlies against club teams and various regional selections. He was succeeded by Adhemar Pimenta.

Armindo Nobs Ferreira probably dealt with radios and refrigerators as business and died on 7 February 1947.
