= 1928 Campeonato Carioca =

Campeonato Carioca
- Season: 1928
- Champions: América
- Matches played: 100
- Goals scored: 429 (4.29 per match)
- Top goalscorer: Vicente (São Cristóvão) – 21 goals
- Biggest home win: Botafogo 13-1 Villa Isabel (April 8, 1928)
- Biggest away win: Villa Isabel 0-5 América (April 22, 1928); Brasil 0-5 São Cristóvão (October 21, 1928)
- Highest scoring: Botafogo 13-1 Villa Isabel (April 8, 1928)

The 1928 Campeonato Carioca, the 23rd edition of that championship, kicked off on April 8, 1928 and ended on October 21, 1928. It was organized by AMEA (Associação Metropolitana de Esportes Atléticos, or Metropolitan Athletic Sports Association). Eleven teams participated. América won the title for the 4th time. No teams were relegated.

== Participating teams ==
After its suspension in 1927, Syrio e Libanez appealed it, with the appeal being accepted when the 1928 championship had already begun, and as such, Syrio e Libanez only joined the championship in the Second round.

Club	Home location	Previous season
América	Tijuca, Rio de Janeiro	3rd
Andarahy	Andaraí, Rio de Janeiro	8th
Bangu	Bangu, Rio de Janeiro	7th
Botafogo	Botafogo, Rio de Janeiro	5th
Brasil	Urca, Rio de Janeiro	9th
Flamengo	Flamengo, Rio de Janeiro	1st
Fluminense	Laranjeiras, Rio de Janeiro	2nd
São Cristóvão	São Cristóvão, Rio de Janeiro	6th
Syrio e Libanez	Tijuca, Rio de Janeiro	–
Vasco da Gama	São Cristóvão, Rio de Janeiro	4th
Villa Isabel	Vila Isabel, Rio de Janeiro	10th

== System ==
The tournament would be disputed in a double round-robin format, with the team with the most points winning the title.

== Championship ==
Pos	Team	Pld	W	D	L	GF	GA	GD	Pts	Qualification or relegation
1	América	19	14	4	1	53	24	+29	32	Champions
2	Vasco da Gama	19	12	4	3	43	17	+26	28	
3	Botafogo	19	10	4	5	55	32	+23	24	
4	Flamengo	19	12	0	7	49	35	+14	24	
5	Fluminense	19	11	1	7	41	32	+9	23	
6	São Cristóvão	19	10	1	8	50	32	+18	21	
7	Bangu	19	7	1	11	37	36	+1	15	
8	Andarahy	19	5	3	11	40	67	−27	13	
9	Syrio e Libanez	10	4	0	6	18	25	−7	8	
10	Brasil	19	2	3	14	20	49	−29	7	
11	Villa Isabel	19	2	1	16	23	80	−57	5	Abandoned the league after the end of the season

Updated to match(es) played on October 21, 1928. Source: RSSSF.com
Rules for classification: 1) points; 2) goal difference; 3) wins; 4) number of goals scored.
