= 1932 Campeonato Carioca =

Campeonato Carioca
- Season: 1932
- Champions: Botafogo
- Matches played: 132
- Goals scored: 565 (4.28 per match)
- Top goalscorer: Preguinho (Fluminense) - 21 goals
- Biggest home win: Botafogo 7-0 Olaria (July 31, 1932)
- Biggest away win: Olaria 1-5 Botafogo (May 1, 1932); São Cristóvão 1-5 Botafogo (June 5, 1932); América 1-5 Botafogo (June 19, 1932); Fluminense 1-5 Olaria (October 16, 1932)
- Highest scoring: Bangu 6-3 Olaria (July 10, 1932); São Cristóvão 5-4 Carioca (August 21, 1932); Bonsucesso 4-5 Botafogo (October 2, 1932)

The 1932 Campeonato Carioca was the 27th edition of the Rio de Janeiro state championship. Twelve teams participated. Botafogo won the title for the 5th time.

== Participating teams ==
Club	Home location	Previous season
América	Tijuca, Rio de Janeiro	1st
Andarahy	Andaraí, Rio de Janeiro	T-10th
Bangu	Bangu, Rio de Janeiro	3rd
Bonsucesso	Bonsucesso, Rio de Janeiro	7th
Botafogo	Botafogo, Rio de Janeiro	4th
Brasil	Urca, Rio de Janeiro	T-8th
Carioca	Jardim Botânico, Rio de Janeiro	T-10th
Flamengo	Flamengo, Rio de Janeiro	6th
Fluminense	Laranjeiras, Rio de Janeiro	5th
Olaria	Olaria, Rio de Janeiro	1st (Second level)
São Cristóvão	São Cristóvão, Rio de Janeiro	T-8th
Vasco da Gama	São Cristóvão, Rio de Janeiro	2nd

== Format ==
The tournament was disputed in a double round-robin format, with the team with the most points winning the title.

== Championship ==
Pos	Team	Pld	W	D	L	GF	GA	GD	Pts	Qualification or relegation
1	Botafogo	22	15	6	1	59	24	+35	36	Champions
2	Flamengo	22	13	5	4	50	30	+20	31	
3	Andarahy	22	12	5	5	55	30	+25	29	
4	Bangu	22	9	6	7	53	46	+7	24	
5	São Cristóvão	22	11	2	9	45	47	−2	24	
6	Vasco da Gama	22	9	5	8	52	43	+9	23	
7	Fluminense	22	10	3	9	41	46	−5	23	
8	Bonsucesso	22	7	6	9	44	49	−5	20	
9	América	22	7	3	12	41	51	−10	17	
10	Carioca	22	7	2	13	44	63	−19	16	
11	Olaria	22	4	4	14	47	70	−23	12	
12	Brasil	22	2	5	15	34	66	−32	9	

Source: RSSSF.com
Rules for classification: 1) points; 2) goal difference; 3) wins; 4) number of goals scored.
