= James Calvert =

James Calvert may refer to:

- James Calvert (divine) (died 1698), English Nonconformist divine
- James Calvert (footballer) (1891–?), Brazilian footballer
- James Calvert (missionary) (1813–1892), British Wesleyan Methodist missionary, active in Fiji
- James Calvert (explorer) (1825–1884), British explorer and botanist, active in colonial Australia
- James F. Calvert (1920–2009), United States Navy officer and nuclear submarine commander
- Mike Calvert (James Michael Calvert, 1913–1998), British soldier
