= Douglas Assis =

Brazilian footballer (born 1985)

Personal information
- Full name: Douglas Assis de Oliveira
- Date of birth: 5 May 1985 (age 41)
- Place of birth: Rio de Janeiro, Brazil
- Height: 1.86 m (6 ft 1 in)
- Position: Centre-back

Team information
- Current team: São Bento

Youth career
- 2004–2005: Cabofriense

Senior career*
Years	Team	Apps	(Gls)
2005–2010	Cabofriense	0	(0)
2006	→ Bangu (loan)	0	(0)
2007	→ Bangu (loan)	0	(0)
2007	→ Fluminense (loan)	0	(0)
2008	→ Audax Rio (loan)	0	(0)
2010–2011	Madureira	9	(0)
2011–2013	Macaé	21	(4)
2013	Vila Nova	18	(3)
2014	Veranópolis	0	(0)
2014–2015	Macaé	29	(2)
2016	Vila Nova	9	(0)
2017	Cabofriense	0	(0)
2017	Boa Esporte	26	(4)
2018	São Bento	18	(2)
2019	Brasil de Pelotas	0	(0)
2019	→ Sampaio Corrêa (loan)	7	(0)
2020–	São Bento	6	(2)
- * Club domestic league appearances and goals as of 10:27, 20 June 2019 (UTC)

Douglas Assis de Oliveira, commonly known as Douglas Assis, is a Brazilian footballer who plays as a centre-back for Sampaio Corrêa in 2019 Campeonato Brasileiro Série C, on loan from Brasil de Pelotas.

== Career ==
Douglas Assis started his career with Cabofriense in the junior ranks, moving up to the senior squad in 2005, and reaching the semi-final of the Taça Guanabara. Two years later he was part of the squad which reached the final of 2007 Campeonato Carioca#Taça Rio. He left in 2010 to become a member of the Madureira team that played in national league competition for the first time, in 2010 Campeonato Brasileiro Série D, winning promotion at the first attempt. He also represented Macaé for four seasons in the national league, in Campeonato Brasileiro Série C in 2011, 2012 and 2014 and in 2015 Campeonato Brasileiro Série B, punctuated by a spell with Vila Nova in 2013 Campeonato Brasileiro Série C. He returned to Vila Nova for the 2016 season, but lost his place in the 2016 Campeonato Brasileiro Série B team when a new coach arrived and terminated his contract in September, allowing him to rejoin his first club Cabofriense for the 2017 season.

Douglas Assis joined Boa Esporte in February 2017, and in one of his first 2017 Campeonato Brasileiro Série B games, scored a direct free-kick from the half-way line against Figueirense which resulted in the debut, and Figueirense career, of goalkeeper Fábio ending at half-time. At the end of the season he signed with São Bento for 2018. His 2018 Campeonato Brasileiro Série B season was cut short with a cruciate ligament injury in July.

In December 2018 Douglas Assis was announced as one of the new signings of the Brasil de Pelotas squad to play in the 2019 Campeonato Gaúcho, and after the end of the competition was loaned to Sampaio Corrêa for the 2019 Campeonato Brasileiro Série C season.
