= Nicolas Ladany =

Hungarian football coach

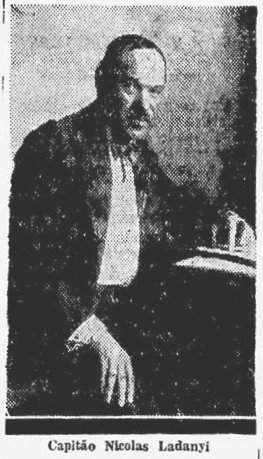
- Nicolas Ladany, 1931

Personal information
- Full name: Nicolau Ladányi
- Date of birth: 7 April 1889
- Place of birth: Budapest, Hungary

Senior career*
Years	Team	Apps	(Gls)
1930–1933	Botafogo FC (manager)		
1933–1934	America FC (manager)		
1939	Botafogo FC (staff)		
- * Club domestic league appearances and goals

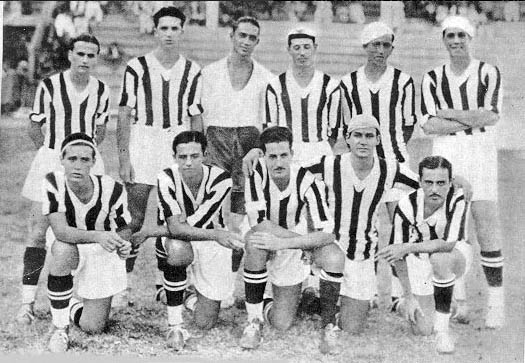
Botafogo 1930. Front row, centre: Carvalho Leite

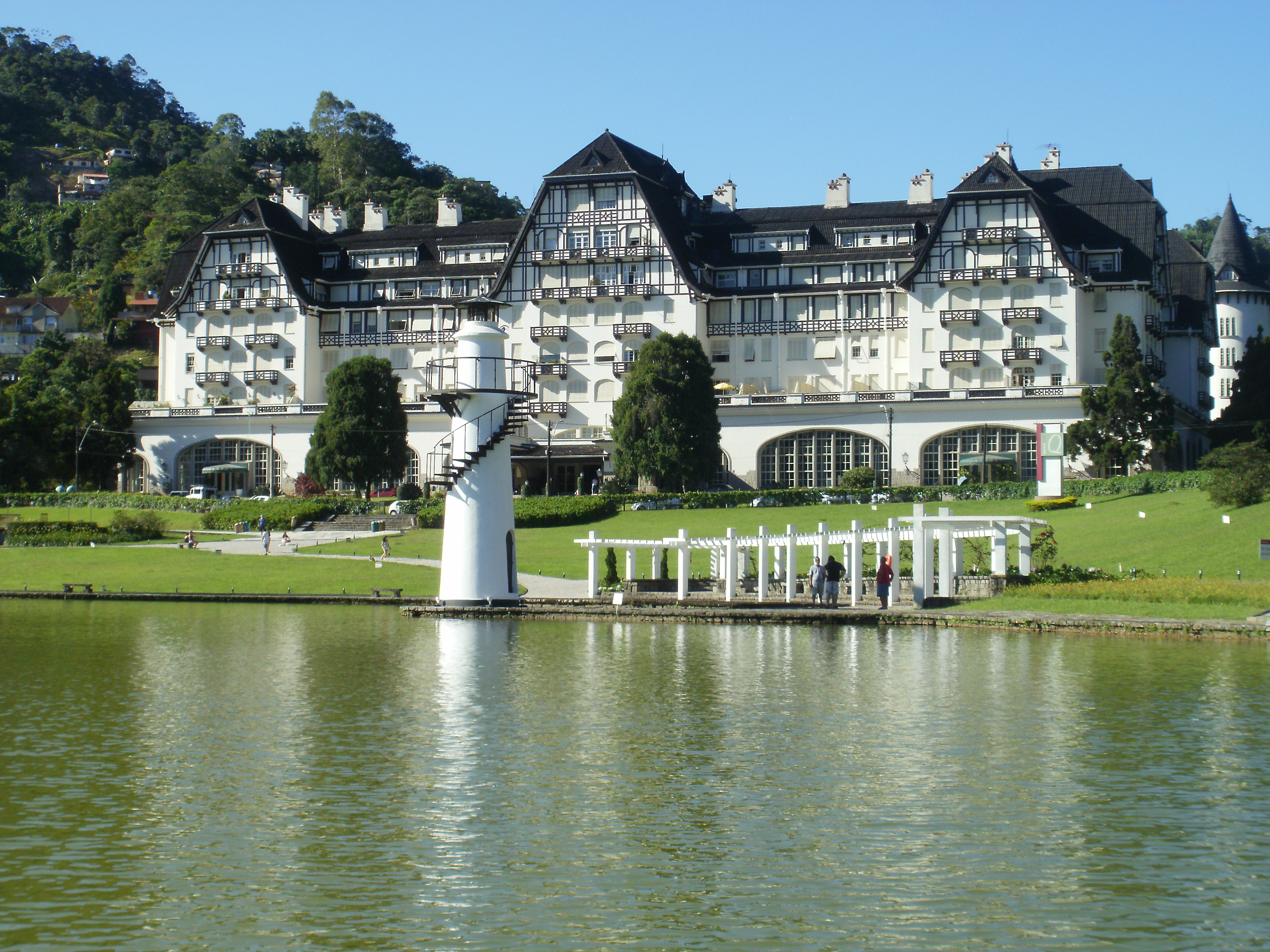
Hotel Palácio Quitandinha

Nicolas Ladany (also Nicolau Ladányi, 7 April 1889- unknown) was a Hungarian association football coach from Budapest. Most notable are his two Championships of Rio de Janeiro with Botafogo FC in 1930 and 1932. He later became an identity of the show business of Rio de Janeiro.

== Career ==
Ladany was a footballer and served in the Austria armed forces. After World War I he emigrated to the United States of America, where he undertook specialised studies in sports training and became a naturalised citizen in order to run a gymnasium. Reportedly, he was for an extended period director of the Aeskulap Health Institute of New York.

In 1930, he moved to Brazil where he was employed by the legendary president of Botafogo FC, of Rio de Janeiro, later known as Botafogo FR, Paulo Azeredo as "technical director." His employment occurred in the midst of the 1930 season of the Championship of Rio de Janeiro and at that time the sports director at the club was the medical doctor Victor Guisard and the coaching was in the hands of the Englishman Charles Williams, the former Manchester City goalkeeper. Ladany's brief included deploying a psychoanalysis based training programme, which Williams disagreed with. Williams resigned and was initially retained as assistant coach alongside star-player Nilo Braga before quickly moving on to CR Flamengo.

Under the stewardship of Ladany Botafogo went on to win the championship by the end of the year, the up to then only fourth title of Botafogo. After finishing only fourth in 1931 Botafogo was champion once more in 1932, with only one defeat and two draws in 22 matches. Stars of Botafogo in that era were players like Carvalho Leite, the team's top-scorer Nilo Braga and Martim Silveira. Botafogo would in this period, which describes the first "golden era" of the club, win also the three championships from 1933 to 1935. However, the latter successes occurred in a period when there were two simultaneous championships in Rio, primarily because the clubs were divided by their attitude towards professionalisation. Ladany himself was an opponent of professionalism, as he thought, Rio could only carry three or four professional teams, and top teams like his Botafogo, had only about four players who would be suitable as professionals. Similar success for Botafogo would only recur in the late 1950s and early 1960s, coinciding with the third presidency of Azeredo, when the side fronted by Garrincha, Nilton Santos and Valdir "Didi" Perreira would win three championships.

By mid 1933, during the course of the season, Ladany switched to crosstown rivals America FC of the new dissident competition of the Liga Carioca de Football, which organised in that year the first professional season in Rio. At Botafogo Ladany was replaced by Victor Guisard. America finished only fifth out of six teams in its league. Until July 1933 he had also served in the Football Commission of AMEA, the governing body of Rio's football since 1924; in consequence of the schism on Rio's football Ladany's fellow members Harry Welfare, Luíz Vinhaes (the coach of the national team at the `1934 World Cup in Italy) and Jayme Barcellos had already resigned by February, leaving the capitão as the only commissioner then. Ladany also acted, at least on occasions, as coach of its selective team.

After his brief time with America, which did not last beyond early February 1934 he went back to the USA for a brief period, where he reported, that he was involved with the training of the USA national team in preparation for the 1934 World Cup. He also reported of the difficulties assembling a strong side, because most players would be from abroad, from countries like Scotland and Spain. He mentioned, on his return in May 1934, that stars there would make in "average 40.000 dollars per year."

From October 1934, he was hired as instructor at Liga de Sports da Marinha, the sports club of the navy. Under Ladany's stewardship their football team took take part in qualifying matches for the Campeonato dos Campeões of 1936, organised by the Federação Brasileira de Futebol.

In 1938, he became associated with the Casino in Urca, in those days known through stars like Carmen Miranda, where he worked for the publicity department. Later he became artistic director there.

In May 1939, he returned for a few weeks to Botafogo, where he was part of the staff of coach José "Juca da Praia" Ferreira Lemos, whose job later on that year would handed to the great Izidor Kürschner. In the early 1940s he still served the Liga de Sports of the navy.

Until the late 1950s or even into the 1960s Ladany, then called a person "closely associated with the show business of Rio in the era of the casinos," was "social director" (director social) of the famous Hotel Quitandinha in Petrópolis north of Rio, which in that era hosted international stars like Jayne Mansfield.

His daughter, Glória Ladany, started her career around 1955 as a dancer in the variety shows of Carlos Machado. Few years an actress, she transitioned into acting and appeared regularly in Rio de Janeiro's theatres during the following decades. From 1959 she also worked in film and television and later became a voice actor, dubbing numerous performers.

== Career summary ==
=== Clubs ===
- 1930-33: Botafogo FC
- 1933-34: America FC
- 1939: Botafogo FC (coaching staff)
- 1934-4x: Liga de Sports da Marinha

=== Honours ===
- Championship of Rio de Janeiro: 1930, 1932
