= 1931 Campeonato Carioca =

Campeonato Carioca
- Season: 1931
- Champions: América
- Matches played: 110
- Goals scored: 439 (3.99 per match)
- Top goalscorer: Russinho (Vasco da Gama) – 17 goals
- Biggest home win: Vasco da Gama 7-0 Flamengo (April 26, 1931)
- Biggest away win: São Cristóvão 1-5 Vasco da Gama (April 19, 1931); Andarahy 0-4 Botafogo (November 22, 1931)
- Highest scoring: Bonsucesso 7-3 Brasil (November 15, 1931); Bonsucesso 7-3 Andarahy (November 29, 1931)

The 1931 Campeonato Carioca, the 26th edition of the Rio de Janeiro state championship. Eleven teams participated. América won the title for the 5th time. No teams were relegated. Carioca joined the league after Syrio e Libanez left following the 1930 season.

== Participating teams ==
| Club | Home location | Previous season |
|---|---|---|
| América | Tijuca, Rio de Janeiro | 3rd |
| Andarahy | Andaraí, Rio de Janeiro | 10th |
| Bangu | Bangu, Rio de Janeiro | T-4th |
| Bonsucesso | Bonsucesso, Rio de Janeiro | 9th |
| Botafogo | Botafogo, Rio de Janeiro | 1st |
| Brasil | Urca, Rio de Janeiro | 11th |
| Carioca | Jardim Botânico, Rio de Janeiro | 1st (Second level) |
| Flamengo | Flamengo, Rio de Janeiro | 8th |
| Fluminense | Laranjeiras, Rio de Janeiro | 6th |
| São Cristóvão | São Cristóvão, Rio de Janeiro | T-4th |
| Vasco da Gama | São Cristóvão, Rio de Janeiro | 2nd |

== Format ==
The tournament was disputed in a double round-robin format, with the team with the most points winning the title.

== Championship ==
| Pos | Team | Pld | W | D | L | GF | GA | GD | Pts | Qualification or relegation |
|---|---|---|---|---|---|---|---|---|---|---|
| 1 | América | 20 | 14 | 2 | 4 | 48 | 26 | +22 | 30 | Champions |
| 2 | Vasco da Gama | 20 | 13 | 3 | 4 | 45 | 24 | +21 | 29 | |
| 3 | Bangu | 20 | 12 | 2 | 6 | 46 | 31 | +15 | 26 | |
| 4 | Botafogo | 20 | 10 | 4 | 6 | 46 | 36 | +10 | 24 | |
| 5 | Fluminense | 20 | 8 | 6 | 6 | 35 | 27 | +8 | 22 | |
| 6 | Flamengo | 20 | 10 | 1 | 9 | 30 | 46 | −16 | 21 | |
| 7 | Bonsucesso | 20 | 8 | 4 | 8 | 58 | 46 | +12 | 20 | |
| 8 | Brasil | 20 | 4 | 6 | 10 | 30 | 46 | −16 | 14 | |
| 9 | São Cristóvão | 20 | 5 | 4 | 11 | 43 | 49 | −6 | 14 | |
| 10 | Andarahy | 20 | 4 | 2 | 14 | 30 | 48 | −18 | 10 | |
| 11 | Carioca | 20 | 4 | 2 | 14 | 28 | 60 | −32 | 10 | |

Source: RSSSF.com
Rules for classification: 1) points; 2) goal difference; 3) wins; 4) number of goals scored.
