= 1916 Campeonato Carioca =

Campeonato Carioca
- Season: 1916
- Champions: América
- Matches: 44
- Goals: 168 (3.82 per match)
- Top goalscorer: Aluízio (Botafogo) – 12 goals
- Biggest home win: Flamengo 4-1 Fluminense (May 13, 1916); Andarahy 5-2 Bangu (October 29, 1916); Bangu 4-1 Fluminense (November 19, 1916)
- Biggest away win: Botafogo 2-7 Fluminense (June 25, 1916); São Cristóvão 3-8 Botafogo (October 22, 1916)
- Highest scoring: São Cristóvão 3-8 Botafogo (October 22, 1916)

The 1916 Campeonato Carioca, the eleventh edition of that championship, kicked off on May 3, 1916 and ended on December 17, 1916. It was organized by LMSA (Liga Metropolitana de Sports Athleticos, or Metropolitan Athletic Sports League). Seven teams participated. América won the title for the 2nd time. No teams were relegated.

== Participating teams ==
Club	Home location	Previous season
América	Tijuca, Rio de Janeiro	3rd
Andarahy	Andaraí, Rio de Janeiro	1st (Second level)
Bangu	Bangu, Rio de Janeiro	6th
Botafogo	Botafogo, Rio de Janeiro	4th
Flamengo	Flamengo, Rio de Janeiro	1st
Fluminense	Laranjeiras, Rio de Janeiro	2nd
São Cristóvão	São Cristóvão, Rio de Janeiro	5th

== System ==
The tournament would be disputed in a double round-robin format, with the team with the most points winning the title. The team with the fewest points would dispute a playoff against the champions of the second level.

== Championship ==
Pos	Team	Pld	W	D	L	GF	GA	GD	Pts	Qualification or relegation
1	América	12	9	0	3	19	13	+6	18	Champions
2	Botafogo	12	5	3	4	30	28	+2	13	
3	Bangu	12	6	1	5	22	20	+2	13	
4	Flamengo	12	4	3	5	23	22	+1	11	
5	Fluminense	12	4	3	5	24	25	−1	11	
6	Andarahy	12	4	2	6	16	19	−3	10	
7	São Cristóvão	12	3	2	7	23	30	−7	8	Relegation Playoffs

Updated to match(es) played on December 8, 1916. Source: RSSSF.com
Rules for classification: 1) points; 2) goal difference; 3) wins; 4) number of goals scored.

=== Second-place playoffs ===
The regulation also stipulated that the runners-up of the championship would also receive a trophy. Since Bangu and Botafogo tied in points for that position, they had to dispute a playoff.

17 December 1916

Botafogo	2 – 1	Bangu
Osny; Vadinho		Antenor

Rua Paysandu, Rio de Janeiro
Referee: Romeu D'Ambrósio

=== Relegation playoffs ===
The last-placed team, São Cristóvão, would dispute a playoff against Carioca, champions of the Second Level. São Cristóvão won the playoff, but Carioca would be promoted anyway as LMSA folded in early 1917, and the new league formed in its place, LMDT, expanded the championship to ten teams.

14 January 1917

São Cristóvão	5 – 3	Carioca
Rollo; Apollo; Sylvio; Rubens Portocarrero		Agenor; Pedro; Dutra

Rua Campos Sales, Rio de Janeiro
Referee: Ávila B. de Mello
