= 1918 in Brazilian football =

Football in Brazil
- Season: 1918

The following article presents a summary of the 1918 football (soccer) season in Brazil, which was the 17th season of competitive football in the country.

== Campeonato Paulista ==
Final Standings

Position	Team	Points	Played	Won	Drawn	Lost	For	Against	Difference
1	Paulistano	24	15	12	0	3	65	11	54
2	Corinthians	23	15	11	1	3	57	15	42
3	AA das Palmeiras	20	15	9	2	4	33	24	8
4	Santos	18	16	7	4	2	42	26	16
5	Ypiranga-SP	12	13	6	0	7	22	38	−17
6	AA São Bento	10	12	4	2	6	39	34	5
7	Mackenzie	4	11	2	0	9	17	38	−21
8	SC Internacional de São Paulo	4	14	2	0	12	16	64	−48
9	Minas Gerais	5	12	2	1	9	9	48	−39

Paulistano declared as the Campeonato Paulista champions.

== State championship champions ==
State	Champion
Amazonas	Nacional
Bahia	Ypiranga-BA
Espírito Santo	Rio Branco-ES
Maranhão	Fênix
Minas Gerais	América-MG
Pará	Remo
Paraná	Britânia
Pernambuco	América-PE
Rio de Janeiro (DF)	Fluminense
São Paulo	Paulistano
Sergipe	Cotingüiba

== Brazil national team ==
The following table lists all the games played by the Brazil national football team in official competitions and friendly matches during 1918.

Date	Opposition	Result	Score	Brazil scorers	Competition
January 27, 1918	(Uruguay) Dublin	L	0–1	–	Copa Confraternidad
