= Mimi Sodré =

Brazilian footballer and scout

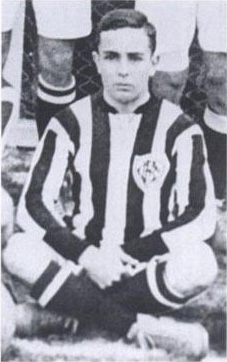
- Mimi Sodré

Personal information
- Full name: Benjamin de Almeida Sodré
- Date of birth: April 10, 1892
- Place of birth: Belém, Brazil
- Date of death: February 1, 1982 (aged 89)
- Place of death: Rio de Janeiro, Brazil
- Position: Striker

Senior career*
Years	Team	Apps	(Gls)
1908–1916	Botafogo		
1922	Botafogo		

International career
1916	Brazil	2	(1)
Medal record
Men's football
Representing Brazil
South American Championship
Third place	1916 Argentina
- * Club domestic league appearances and goals

Benjamin de Almeida Sodré (April 10, 1892 – February 1, 1982), commonly known as Benjamin Sodré or as Mimi Sodré, was a Brazilian scout and football striker who played for the Brazil national team.

== Career ==
Born in Belém, Mimi Sodré started his career in 1908, defending Botafogo, leaving the club in 1916. He returned to play for Botafogo in 1922.

=== National team ===
He played two games for the Brazil national team in 1916. His first game for the national team, on July 12, was against Uruguay. Playing against that country again on July 18, he scored a goal.

=== President of Botafogo ===
Mimi Sodré was president of Botafogo Football Club in 1941. Botafogo was one of the two clubs that fused to form Botafogo de Futebol e Regatas in 1942.

== Scouting ==
Sodré joined the scouting movement in 1917, motivated by a French book on Scouting that he had read several years earlier. He participated in the foundation of the Federação Brasileira dos Escoteiros do Mar in 1921 and wrote a scouting column for the weekly magazine O Tico-Tico under the pseudonym "Velho Lobo", by which he became known in the movement. Sodré was also a leading supporter of the unification of Brazilian scouting and wrote the call that led to the foundation of the União dos Escoteiros do Brasil in 1924. In 1925, he published a scouting book titled Guia do Escoteiro.

== Honours ==
Botafogo

- Campeonato Carioca: 1910, 1912

Individual

- Campeonato Carioca top scorer: 1912, 1913

== See also ==
- List of Brazil international footballers
