= 1939 Campeonato Carioca =

Campeonato Carioca
- Season: 1939
- Champions: Flamengo
- Matches: 108
- Goals: 432 (4 per match)
- Top goalscorer: Carvalho Leite (Botafogo) – 22 goals
- Biggest home win: Fluminense 8-2 Bonsucesso (April 2, 1939); Flamengo 7-1 America (May 28, 1939); Botafogo 6-0 Bangu (September 3, 1939)
- Biggest away win: Madureira 1-5 Flamengo (April 2, 1939); São Cristóvão 1-5 Flamengo (April 23, 1939); Flamengo 0-4 Bangu (May 7, 1939); Bonsucesso 1-5 Flamengo (June 18, 1939); Vasco da Gama 1-5 Flamengo (December 3, 1939)
- Highest scoring: Fluminense 8-2 Bonsucesso (April 2, 1939)

The 1939 Campeonato Carioca was the 34th edition of the tournament. The competition began on April 2, 1939 and ended on December 3. Flamengo won their 7th title in the history of the competition. Botafogo finished runners-up.

== Format ==
The tournament was contested as a triple round-robin with nine teams competing.

== Final standings ==
| Pos | Team | Pld | W | D | L | GF | GA | GD | Pts | Qualification or relegation |
|---|---|---|---|---|---|---|---|---|---|---|
| 1 | Flamengo | 24 | 16 | 4 | 4 | 67 | 34 | +33 | 36 | Champions |
| 2 | Botafogo | 24 | 14 | 5 | 5 | 80 | 42 | +38 | 33 | |
| 3 | São Cristóvão | 24 | 11 | 7 | 6 | 52 | 46 | +6 | 29 | |
| 4 | Fluminense | 24 | 11 | 5 | 8 | 60 | 44 | +16 | 27 | |
| 5 | America | 24 | 10 | 4 | 10 | 45 | 53 | −8 | 24 | |
| 6 | Vasco da Gama | 24 | 8 | 7 | 9 | 32 | 34 | −2 | 23 | |
| 7 | Madureira | 24 | 4 | 9 | 11 | 36 | 56 | −20 | 17 | |
| 8 | Bangu | 24 | 5 | 4 | 15 | 31 | 62 | −31 | 14 | |
| 9 | Bonsucesso | 24 | 5 | 3 | 16 | 29 | 61 | −32 | 13 | |

Source: RSSSF.com
Rules for classification: 1) points; 2) goal difference; 3) wins; 4) number of goals scored.
