= 1937 Campeonato Carioca =

In the 1937 season of the Campeonato Carioca, the last under the split between FBF and CBD, two championships were disputed, each by a different league.

== FMD Championship ==
Unofficial Campeonato Carioca
- Season: 1937
- Champions: São Cristóvão
- Matches: 26
- Goals: 100 (3.85 per match)
- Biggest home win: Madureira 5-0 Bangu (June 20, 1937)
- Biggest away win: Olaria 1-6 Madureira (May 9, 1937); Andarahy 2-7 São Cristóvão (May 16, 1937)
- Highest scoring: Andarahy 2-7 São Cristóvão (May 16, 1937)

The edition of the Campeonato Carioca organized by FMD (Federação Metropolitana de Desportos, or Metropolitan Sports Federation) kicked off on May 2, 1937, and ended on July 11, 1937. Eight teams participated. no teams were relegated.

=== System ===
The tournament would be disputed in three stages, on the same format as in the previous year:

- First round: All eight teams play in a single round-robin format against each other. The team with the most points qualifies to the Finals.
- Second round: All eight teams play in a single round-robin format against each other. The team with the most points qualifies to the Finals.
- Finals: The round winners play in a best-of-three points series for the title.

However, in 17 of July, with only two matches left to be played in the first round, the chairmen of América, Pedro Magalhães Correa, and Vasco da Gama, Pedro Novaes, put forward a proposal for not only the reconciliation of FMD and LCF, but FBF and CBD, which was accepted by both leagues' clubs two days later. As a consequence, FMD effectively ceased to exist, with its championship yet unfinished. At the time, São Cristóvão led the first round and no other teams could reach it, even with the matches that still hadn't been held. In 3 of September, the FMD General Council declared São Cristóvão as the champion of its 1937 championship, but that title is not recognized as an official Carioca title.

=== Championship ===
Pos	Team	Pld	W	D	L	GF	GA	GD	Pts	Qualification or relegation
1	São Cristóvão	7	7	0	0	28	10	+18	14	Champions
2	Madureira	7	5	1	1	21	7	+14	11	
3	Vasco da Gama	5	3	1	1	7	5	+2	7 (Note: The league was interrupted before Vasco could play its last two matches against Olaria and Botafogo)	
4	Bangu	7	3	0	4	11	15	−4	6	
5	Olaria	6	2	1	3	14	15	−1	5	
6	Botafogo	6	2	1	3	7	9	−2	5	
7	Carioca	7	1	1	5	7	18	−11	3	
8	Andarahy	7	0	1	6	5	21	−16	1	

Updated to match(es) played on July 11, 1937. Source: RSSSF.com
Rules for classification: 1) points; 2) goal difference; 3) wins; 4) number of goals scored.

== LFRJ Championship ==
Campeonato Carioca
- Season: 1937
- Champions: Fluminense
- Matches: 132
- Goals: 654 (4.95 per match)
- Top goalscorer: Niginho (Vasco da Gama) – 25 goals
- Biggest home win: São Cristóvão 7-0 Olaria (November 21, 1937); Fluminense 7-0 Bangu (December 15, 1937); Flamengo 7-0 Bonsucesso (January 12, 1938)
- Biggest away win: Andarahy 0-12 Vasco da Gama (December 29, 1937)
- Highest scoring: Andarahy 0-12 Vasco da Gama (December 29, 1937)

Ever since 1935, the FMD championship had been starting earlier than the LCF championship. as such, by the time both leagues were reconciled, LCF's 1937 championship hadn't even started.

The new state league would be called LFRJ (Liga de Futebol do Rio de Janeiro, or Rio de Janeiro Football League), and would have nine teams as founding members - Vasco da Gama, Botafogo, Bangu, São Cristóvão and Madureira, from FMD, and América, Flamengo, Fluminense and Bonsucesso from LCF. The 1937 championship was slated to have twelve teams, and as such, Olaria, Andarahy (both from FMD) and Portuguesa (LCF) were invited to join the championship.

To celebrate the reconciliation, América and Vasco da Gama would play a friendly match, with a trophy called the Taça da Paz (Peace Cup) at stake. Vasco won that match by 3-2, and the derby between both teams has been known as "Clássico da Paz" (Peace Derby) ever since.

The LFRJ championship would kick off on October 1, 1937, and would end only on January 30, 1938. Fluminense won the title for the 11th time. no teams were relegated, although Olaria, Andarahy and Portuguesa weren't invited back for 1938's championship.

=== System ===
The tournament would be disputed in a double round-robin format, with the team with the most points winning the title.

=== Championship ===
Pos	Team	Pld	W	D	L	GF	GA	GD	Pts	Qualification or relegation
1	Fluminense	22	17	4	1	65	22	+43	38	Champions
2	Flamengo	22	15	5	2	83	34	+49	35	
3	Vasco da Gama	22	13	4	5	84	42	+42	30	
4	Botafogo	22	12	4	6	67	31	+36	28	
5	São Cristóvão	22	12	4	6	67	35	+32	28	
6	América	22	11	6	5	66	38	+28	28	
7	Madureira	22	10	3	9	54	46	+8	23	
8	Portuguesa (G)	22	6	3	13	42	70	−28	15	
9	Bonsucesso	22	6	3	13	32	77	−45	15	
10	Olaria (G)	22	4	3	15	37	90	−53	11	
11	Bangu	22	4	2	16	28	61	−33	10	
12	Andarahy (G)	22	1	1	20	29	108	−79	3	

Updated to match(es) played on January 30, 1938. Source: RSSSF.com
Rules for classification: 1) points; 2) goal difference; 3) wins; 4) number of goals scored.
(G) Guests
