= 1909 Campeonato Carioca =

Campeonato Carioca
- Season: 1909
- Champions: Fluminense
- Matches: 33
- Goals: 171 (5.18 per match)
- Top goalscorer: Flávio Ramos (Botafogo) – 18 goals
- Biggest home win: Botafogo 24-0 Mangueira (May 30, 1909)
- Biggest away win: Bangu 0-9 Fluminense (May 23, 1909)
- Highest scoring: Botafogo 24-0 Mangueira (May 30, 1909)

The 1909 Campeonato Carioca, the fourth edition of that championship, kicked off on May 2, 1909 and ended on October 31, 1909. It was organized by LMSA (Liga Metropolitana de Sports Athleticos, or Metropolitan Athletic Sports League). Seven teams participated. Fluminense won the title for the 4th time. No teams were relegated.

== Participating teams ==
Club	Home location	Previous season
América	Tijuca, Rio de Janeiro	3rd
Bangu	Bangu, Rio de Janeiro	–
Botafogo	Botafogo, Rio de Janeiro	2nd
Fluminense	Laranjeiras, Rio de Janeiro	1st
Haddock Lobo	Tijuca, Rio de Janeiro	–
Mangueira	Tijuca, Rio de Janeiro	–
Riachuelo	Riachuelo, Rio de Janeiro	6th

== System ==
The tournament would be disputed in a double round-robin format, with the team with the most points winning the title.

== Championship ==
Pos	Team	Pld	W	D	L	GF	GA	GD	Pts	Qualification or relegation
1	Fluminense	10	8	2	0	45	8	+37	18	Champions
2	Botafogo	10	7	2	1	53	6	+47	16	
3	América	10	6	2	2	28	11	+17	14	
4	Riachuelo	10	3	1	6	12	32	−20	7	
5	Haddock Lobo	10	1	2	7	13	53	−40	4	
6	Mangueira	10	0	1	9	4	45	−41	1 (Note: Mangueira withdrew from the championship after the end of the first round; all its remaining matches were counted as walkovers.)	Withdrew
7	Bangu	3	1	0	2	4	12	−8	2 (Note: Bangu withdrew from the championship after its third match; all its matches were annulled.)	Withdrew

Updated to match(es) played on October 31, 1909. Source: RSSSF.com
Rules for classification: 1) points; 2) goal difference; 3) wins; 4) number of goals scored.
