= 2006 Campeonato Carioca =

Campeonato Carioca
- Season: 2006
- Champions: Botafogo
- Relegated: Portuguesa
- Copa do Brasil: Botafogo; Madureira; América
- Série C: Americano; América; Madureira; Cabofriense
- Matches: 74
- Goals: 245 (3.31 per match)
- Top goalscorer: Dodô (Botafogo) - 9 goals
- Biggest home win: Fluminense 4-0 Portuguesa (January 15, 2006); Nova Iguaçu 5-1 Friburguense (March 11, 2006)
- Biggest away win: Nova Iguaçu 0-6 Fluminense (January 18, 2006)
- Highest scoring: Botafogo 5-3 Vasco da Gama (January 22, 2006)

The 2006 edition of the Campeonato Carioca kicked off on January 14 and ended on April 9, 2006. It is the official tournament organized by FFERJ (Federação de Futebol do Estado do Rio de Janeiro, or Rio de Janeiro State Football Federation. Only clubs based in the Rio de Janeiro State are allowed to play. Twelve teams contested this edition. Botafogo won the title for the 18th time. Portuguesa was relegated.

== System ==
The tournament was divided in two stages:

- Taça Guanabara: The 12 clubs were divided into two groups. teams from each group played in single round-robin format against the others in their group. Top two teams in each group advanced to semifinal and then, to the final, played in a single match.
- Taça Rio: The teams from one group play against teams from the other group once. Top two teams in each group qualify to semifinal and final, to be played in a single match.
- Finals: Taça Guanabara and Taça Rio winners play twice at Maracanã Stadium. If the same club wins both stages, they will be declared champions and the final won't be necessary.

The finalists automatically qualified to the Copa do Brasil of the following year, plus the team with the best season record outside of them.

== Championship ==
=== Taça Guanabara ===
==== Group A ====
Pos	Team	Pld	W	D	L	GF	GA	GD	Pts	Qualification or relegation
1	Americano	5	3	1	1	12	10	+2	10	Qualified to Semifinals
2	Cabofriense	5	3	0	2	7	7	0	9	Qualified to Semifinals
3	Nova Iguaçu	5	3	0	2	5	11	−6	9	
4	Fluminense	5	2	2	1	14	5	+9	8	
5	Flamengo	5	1	2	2	9	9	0	5	
6	Portuguesa	5	0	1	4	5	13	−8	1	

Updated to match(es) played on February 2, 2006. Source: RSSSF.com
Rules for classification: 1) points; 2) wins; 3) goal difference; 4) number of goals scored.

==== Group B ====
Pos	Team	Pld	W	D	L	GF	GA	GD	Pts	Qualification or relegation
1	América	5	3	0	2	10	6	+4	9	Qualified to Semifinals
2	Botafogo	5	3	0	2	12	9	+3	9	Qualified to Semifinals
3	Volta Redonda	5	3	0	2	10	10	0	9	
4	Vasco da Gama	5	2	1	2	17	8	+9	7	
5	Friburguense	5	2	1	2	6	8	−2	7	
6	Madureira	5	1	0	4	4	11	−7	3	

Updated to match(es) played on February 2, 2006. Source: RSSSF.com
Rules for classification: 1) points; 2) wins; 3) goal difference; 4) number of goals scored.

==== Semifinals ====
Team 1	Score	Team 2
Americano	1–2	Botafogo
América	1–1 (5-4 pen.)	Cabofriense

==== Finals ====
Team 1	Score	Team 2
América	1–3	Botafogo

=== Taça Rio ===
==== Group A ====
Pos	Team	Pld	W	D	L	GF	GA	GD	Pts	Qualification or relegation
1	Cabofriense	6	2	3	1	10	7	+3	9	Qualified to Semifinals
2	Americano	6	2	2	2	9	9	0	8	Qualified to Semifinals
3	Fluminense	6	2	2	2	10	11	−1	8	
4	Flamengo	6	1	3	2	11	12	−1	6	
5	Portuguesa	6	1	2	3	5	11	−6	5	
6	Nova Iguaçu	6	1	1	4	10	13	−3	4	

Updated to match(es) played on March 19, 2006. Source: RSSSF.com
Rules for classification: 1) points; 2) wins; 3) goal difference; 4) number of goals scored.

==== Group B ====
Pos	Team	Pld	W	D	L	GF	GA	GD	Pts	Qualification or relegation
1	América	6	3	2	1	10	6	+4	11	Qualified to Semifinals
2	Madureira	6	3	2	1	9	6	+3	11	Qualified to Semifinals
3	Friburguense	6	3	1	2	14	15	−1	10	
4	Vasco da Gama	6	2	3	1	12	11	+1	9	
5	Volta Redonda	6	2	1	3	8	8	0	7	
6	Botafogo	6	1	4	1	10	9	+1	7	

Updated to match(es) played on March 19, 2006. Source: RSSSF.com
Rules for classification: 1) points; 2) wins; 3) goal difference; 4) number of goals scored.

==== Semifinals ====
Team 1	Score	Team 2
América	1–3	Americano
Cabofriense	1–1 (3-4 pen.)	Madureira

==== Finals ====
Team 1	Score	Team 2
Madureira	1–0	Americano

=== Championship finals ===
Team 1	Agg.	Team 2	1st leg	2nd leg
Botafogo	5–1	Madureira	2–0	3–1

== Aggregate table ==
Pos	Team	Pld	W	D	L	GF	GA	GD	Pts	Qualification or relegation
1	América	11	6	2	3	20	12	+8	20	2007 Copa do Brasil and Série C
2	Cabofriense	11	5	3	3	17	14	+3	18	Série C
3	Americano	11	5	3	3	21	19	+2	18	Série C
4	Friburguense	11	5	2	4	20	23	−3	17	
5	Volta Redonda	11	5	1	5	18	16	+2	16	
6	Fluminense	11	4	4	3	24	16	+8	16	
7	Botafogo	11	4	4	3	22	18	+4	16	2007 Copa do Brasil
8	Vasco da Gama	11	4	4	3	22	21	+1	16	
9	Madureira	11	4	2	5	13	17	−4	14	2007 Copa do Brasil and Série C
10	Nova Iguaçu	11	4	1	6	15	24	−9	13	
11	Flamengo	11	2	5	4	20	21	−1	11	
12	Portuguesa	11	1	3	7	10	24	−14	6	Relegated

Updated to match(es) played on March 19, 2006. Source: RSSSF.com
Rules for classification: 1) points; 2) wins; 3) goal difference; 4) number of goals scored.
