= 1960 Campeonato Carioca =

Campeonato Carioca
- Season: 1960
- Champions: América
- Taça Brasil: América
- Matches played: 132
- Goals scored: 391 (2.96 per match)
- Top goalscorer: Quarentinha (Botafogo) - 25 goals
- Biggest home win: Botafogo 6-0 São Cristóvão (September 10, 1960); Botafogo 6-0 Olaria (October 8, 1960); Vasco da Gama 6-0 Canto do Rio (October 30, 1960)
- Biggest away win: São Cristóvão 0-5 Flamengo (October 9, 1960); Portuguesa 0-5 Botafogo (October 20, 1960); Madureira 0-5 Fluminense (November 12, 1960)
- Highest scoring: Bangu 3-5 Flamengo (November 10, 1960); Bonsucesso 3-5 Botafogo (December 17, 1960)

The 1960 edition of the Campeonato Carioca kicked off on July 24, 1960 and ended on December 18, 1960. It was organized by FCF (Federação Carioca de Futebol, or Carioca Football Federation). Twelve teams participated. América won the title for the 7th time, their last title to date. no teams were relegated.

== System ==
The tournament would be disputed in a double round-robin format, with the team with the most points winning the title.

== Championship ==
Pos	Team	Pld	W	D	L	GF	GA	GD	Pts	Qualification or relegation
1	América	22	16	5	1	39	15	+24	37	Champions
2	Fluminense	22	16	4	2	52	17	+35	36	
3	Botafogo	22	15	5	2	64	24	+40	35	
4	Flamengo	22	12	5	5	42	26	+16	29	
5	Vasco da Gama	22	12	4	6	36	19	+17	28	
6	Bangu	22	10	3	9	27	27	0	23	
7	Olaria	22	5	6	11	25	38	−13	16	
8	Canto do Rio	22	5	4	13	19	48	−29	14	
9	Bonsucesso	22	5	3	14	35	50	−15	13	
10	Portuguesa	22	5	3	14	24	41	−17	13	
11	Madureira	22	3	5	14	20	41	−21	11	
12	São Cristóvão	22	2	5	15	11	45	−34	9	

Updated to match(es) played on December 18, 1960. Source: RSSSF.com
Rules for classification: 1) points; 2) goal difference; 3) wins; 4) number of goals scored.
