= 1912 Campeonato Carioca =

In the 1912 season of the Campeonato Carioca, two championships were disputed, each by a different league.

== AFRJ Championship ==
Campeonato Carioca
- Season: 1912
- Champions: Botafogo
- Matches: 29
- Goals: 151 (5.21 per match)
- Top goalscorer: Mimi Sodré (Botafogo) - 12 goals
- Biggest home win: Botafogo 10-0 Germânia (September 29, 1912)
- Biggest away win: Germânia 1-9 Americano (July 28, 1912)
- Highest scoring: Americano 10-1 Internacional (September 22, 1912)

As a punishment for having left the league, Botafogo was forbidden to participate in LMSA's 1912 championship, which led Botafogo to form a rival league to LMSA, the AFRJ (Associação de Football do Rio de Janeiro, or Rio de Janeiro Football Association); However, Botafogo failed in getting the adherence of any of the other LMSA teams, and as such, the league was mostly populated by minor teams that weren't members of that league. To add to that, Botafogo had also fallen under a financial crisis that led it to sell its field in the Voluntários da Pátria street to the city, and thus, Botafogo moved to a field in the São Clemente street, where most of the championship's matches were held.

The edition of the Campeonato Carioca organized by AFRJ kicked off on May 12, 1912 and ended on October 27, 1912. Seven teams participated, including Petropolitano, the first team from outside the city of Rio de Janeiro or Niterói to participate in the Carioca championship. Its participation, which turned out to be their only one, proved to be short, as the team abandoned the league protesting against the rescheduling of their fourth round match against Botafogo. Botafogo won the championship for the 3rd time. no teams were relegated.

=== Participating teams ===
Club	Home location	Previous season
Americano	Vila Isabel, Rio de Janeiro	–
Botafogo	Botafogo, Rio de Janeiro	5th
Cattete	Catete, Rio de Janeiro	–
Germânia	Jardim Botânico, Rio de Janeiro	–
Internacional	Botafogo, Rio de Janeiro	–
Paulistano	Centro, Rio de Janeiro	–
Petropolitano	Centro, Petrópolis	–

=== System ===
The tournament would be disputed in a double round-robin format, with the team with the most points winning the title.

=== Championship ===
Pos	Team	Pld	W	D	L	GF	GA	GD	Pts	Qualification or relegation
1	Botafogo	11	10	0	1	41	6	+35	20	Champions
2	Americano	11	9	1	1	46	12	+34	19	
3	Paulistano	11	5	2	4	17	26	−9	12	
4	Cattete	11	4	0	7	18	22	−4	8	
5	Germânia	11	3	1	7	12	39	−27	7	
6	Internacional	11	1	1	9	8	42	−34	3	
7	Petropolitano	6	1	1	4	9	4	+5	3	Withdrew

Updated to match(es) played on October 27, 1912. Source: RSSSF.com
Rules for classification: 1) points; 2) goal difference; 3) wins; 4) number of goals scored.

== LMSA Championship ==
Campeonato Carioca
- Season: 1912
- Champions: Paysandu
- Matches: 54
- Goals: 266 (4.93 per match)
- Top goalscorer: Harry Robinson (Paysandu) – 26 goals
- Biggest home win: Flamengo 14-0 Mangueira (September 8, 1912)
- Biggest away win: Mangueira 2-16 Flamengo (May 3, 1912)
- Highest scoring: Mangueira 2-16 Flamengo (May 3, 1912)

The edition of the Campeonato Carioca organized by LMSA (Liga Metropolitana de Sports Athleticos, or Metropolitan Athletic Sports League) kicked off on May 3, 1912 and ended on November 1, 1912. Paysandu won the championship for the 1st time. no teams were relegated.

=== Participating teams ===
The league was expanded that year from six to eight teams, with the four participants of the previous year's championship, the three best teams from the second level, and Flamengo, a rowing club that had formed its own football department, mostly comprising former Fluminense players that had a falling out with the club's officialdom in the previous year.

Club	Home location	Previous season
América	Tijuca, Rio de Janeiro	2nd
Bangu	Bangu, Rio de Janeiro	1st (Second level)
Flamengo	Flamengo, Rio de Janeiro	–
Fluminense	Laranjeiras, Rio de Janeiro	1st
Mangueira	Tijuca, Rio de Janeiro	3rd (Second level)
Paysandu	Flamengo, Rio de Janeiro	4th
Rio Cricket	Praia Grande, Niterói	3rd
São Cristóvão	São Cristóvão, Rio de Janeiro	2nd (Second level)

=== System ===
The tournament would be disputed in a double round-robin format, with the team with the most points winning the title.

=== Championship ===
Pos	Team	Pld	W	D	L	GF	GA	GD	Pts	Qualification or relegation
1	Paysandu	14	11	2	1	64	13	+51	24	Champions
2	Flamengo	14	10	2	2	65	16	+49	22	
3	América	14	9	2	3	37	16	+21	20	
4	Rio Cricket	14	7	3	4	29	19	+10	17	
5	Fluminense	14	7	2	5	27	25	+2	16	
6	Bangu	14	2	1	11	24	51	−27	5	
7	São Cristóvão	14	2	1	11	10	46	−36	5	
8	Mangueira	14	1	1	12	10	79	−69	3	

Updated to match(es) played on November 1, 1912. Source: RSSSF.com
Rules for classification: 1) points; 2) goal difference; 3) wins; 4) number of goals scored.
