= 1926 Campeonato Carioca =

Campeonato Carioca
- Season: 1926
- Champions: São Cristóvão
- Matches played: 90
- Goals scored: 474 (5.27 per match)
- Top goalscorer: Vicente (São Cristóvão) – 25 goals
- Biggest home win: Flamengo 8-1 Botafogo (August 15, 1926)
- Biggest away win: Brasil 3-9 Vasco da Gama (April 21, 1926); Brasil 1-7 Botafogo (June 20, 1926); Brasil 0-6 São Cristóvão (August 8, 1926); Syrio e Libanez 0-6 Fluminense (August 29, 1926)
- Highest scoring: Brasil 3-9 Vasco da Gama (April 21, 1926); São Cristóvão 7-5 Syrio e Libanez (August 15, 1926)

The 1926 Campeonato Carioca, the 21st edition of that championship, kicked off on April 4, 1926 and ended on November 21, 1926. It was organized by AMEA (Associação Metropolitana de Esportes Atléticos, or Metropolitan Athletic Sports Association). Ten teams participated. São Cristóvão won the title for the 1st time. No teams were relegated.

== Participating teams ==
Originally, there would be no promotion and relegation within the league, even though there was a Second level, but at the end of the 1925 season, Hellênico left the league. To fill the remaining berth in the first level, the winners and runners-up of 1925's Second level, Andarahy and Villa Isabel, respectively, applied, with Villa Isabel being chosen.

Club	Home location	Previous season
América	Tijuca, Rio de Janeiro	5th
Bangu	Bangu, Rio de Janeiro	7th
Botafogo	Botafogo, Rio de Janeiro	4th
Brasil	Urca, Rio de Janeiro	10th
Flamengo	Flamengo, Rio de Janeiro	1st
Fluminense	Laranjeiras, Rio de Janeiro	2nd
São Cristóvão	São Cristóvão, Rio de Janeiro	6th
Syrio e Libanez	Tijuca, Rio de Janeiro	8th
Vasco da Gama	São Cristóvão, Rio de Janeiro	3rd
Villa Isabel	Vila Isabel, Rio de Janeiro	2nd (Second level)

== System ==
The tournament would be disputed in a double round-robin format, with the team with the most points winning the title.

== Championship ==
Pos	Team	Pld	W	D	L	GF	GA	GD	Pts	Qualification or relegation
1	São Cristóvão	18	14	2	2	70	37	+33	30	Champions
2	Vasco da Gama	18	14	1	3	66	30	+36	29	
3	Fluminense	18	13	1	4	50	27	+23	27	
4	Bangu	18	10	1	7	50	34	+16	21	
5	Flamengo	18	7	5	6	53	40	+13	19	
6	Botafogo	18	7	0	11	55	67	−12	14	
7	Syrio e Libanez	18	6	2	10	36	56	−20	14	Suspended from the league
8	América	18	5	1	12	42	56	−14	11	
9	Villa Isabel	18	4	2	12	27	51	−24	10	
10	Brasil	18	2	1	15	25	79	−54	5	

Updated to match(es) played on November 21, 1926. Source: RSSSF.com
Rules for classification: 1) points; 2) goal difference; 3) wins; 4) number of goals scored.
