= 1908 Campeonato Carioca =

Campeonato Carioca
- Season: 1908
- Champions: Fluminense
- Matches: 23
- Goals: 103 (4.48 per match)
- Top goalscorer: Edwin Cox (Fluminense) – 12 goals
- Biggest home win: Fluminense 11-0 Riachuelo (July 5, 1908)
- Biggest away win: Paysandu 1-10 Fluminense (May 3, 1908)
- Highest scoring: Paysandu 1-10 Fluminense (May 3, 1908); Fluminense 11-0 Riachuelo (July 5, 1908)

The 1908 Campeonato Carioca, the third edition of that championship, kicked off on May 3, 1908, and ended on November 1, 1908. It was organized by LMSA (Liga Metropolitana de Sports Athleticos, or Metropolitan Athletic Sports League). Six teams participated. Fluminense won the title for the 3rd time. No teams were relegated.

== Participating teams ==
Club	Home location	Previous season
América	Tijuca, Rio de Janeiro	–
Botafogo	Botafogo, Rio de Janeiro	1st
Fluminense	Laranjeiras, Rio de Janeiro	1st
Paissandu	Flamengo, Rio de Janeiro	4th
Riachuelo	Riachuelo, Rio de Janeiro	–
Rio Cricket	Praia Grande, Niterói	–

== System ==
The tournament would be disputed in a double round-robin format, with the team with the most points winning the title.

== Championship ==
Pos	Team	Pld	W	D	L	GF	GA	GD	Pts	Qualification or relegation
1	Fluminense	10	8	2	0	44	11	+33	18	Champions
2	Botafogo	10	6	2	2	20	11	+9	14	
3	América	10	7	0	3	18	12	+6	14	
4	Rio Cricket	10	5	0	5	18	9	+9	10	
5	Paysandu	10	2	0	8	3	38	−35	4	
6	Riachuelo	10	0	0	10	0	22	−22	0 (Note: Riachuelo withdrew from the championship after its third match and all its remaining matches were counted as walkovers.)	Withdrew

Updated to match(es) played on November 1, 1908. Source: RSSSF.com
Rules for classification: 1) points; 2) goal difference; 3) wins; 4) number of goals scored.
