= James Calvert (footballer) =

Brazilian footballer

Personal information
- Full name: James William Calvert
- Date of birth: 28 March 1891
- Place of birth: Rio de Janeiro, Brazil
- Date of death: Unknown
- Position: Forward

Senior career*
Years	Team	Apps	(Gls)
1909–1911	Rio Cricket		
1911–1916	Fluminense	26	(8)
1916–1919	Bangu		
1920	Santos		
- * Club domestic league appearances and goals as of 1 March 2024

James Calvert (28 March 1891 – ?), was a Brazilian footballer who played as a forward.

== Career ==
Born in Rio de Janeiro and son of English parents who worked at the Alliance Textile Factory in Rua das Laranjeiras, James Calvert spent part of his childhood in Chadderton, United Kingdom, where he learned to play football. Back in Brazil as a young man, he played for Rio Cricket, Fluminense, where he was state champion in 1911, being top scorer, and, alongside Oswaldo Gomes, one of the only players who did not leave the club for the founding of CR Flamengo. He also played for Bangu and Santos in 1920.

== Personal life ==
His brother Edward Calvert, was also a football player, and scored the first goal in the history of the Fla-Flu classic, 7 July 1912, in the first minute of the match.

== Honours ==
Fluminense

- Campeonato Carioca: 1911

Individual

- 1911 Campeonato Carioca top scorer: 7 goals
