= 2005 Campeonato Carioca =

Campeonato Carioca
- Season: 2005
- Champions: Fluminense
- Relegated: Olaria
- Copa do Brasil: Americano; Volta Redonda; Cabofriense
- Série C: Americano; Volta Redonda; Cabofriense; Madureira
- Matches played: 74
- Goals scored: 219 (2.96 per match)
- Top goalscorer: Túlio (Volta Redonda) - 12 goals
- Biggest home win: Fluminense 4-0 América (February 23, 2005); Fluminense 4-0 Botafogo (March 13, 2005)
- Biggest away win: Flamengo 0-3 Olaria (January 23, 2005); Portuguesa 0-3 Fluminense (March 5, 2005); Friburguense 2-5 Fluminense (March 20, 2005)
- Highest scoring: Friburguense 2-5 Fluminense (March 20, 2005); Volta Redonda 4-3 Fluminense (April 10, 2005)

The 2005 edition of the Campeonato Carioca kicked off on January 22 and ended on April 17, 2005. It is the official tournament organized by FFERJ (Federação de Futebol do Estado do Rio de Janeiro, or Rio de Janeiro State Football Federation. Only clubs based in the Rio de Janeiro State are allowed to play. Twelve teams contested this edition. Fluminense won the title for the 30th time. Olaria was relegated.

== System ==
The tournament was divided in two stages:

- Taça Guanabara: The 12 clubs were divided into two groups. teams from each group played in single round-robin format against the others in their group. Top two teams in each group advanced to semifinal and then, to the final, played in a single match.
- Taça Rio: The teams from one group play against teams from the other group once. Top two teams in each group qualify to semifinal and final, to be played in a single match.
- Finals: Taça Guanabara and Taça Rio winners play twice at Maracanã Stadium. If the same club wins both stages, they will be declared champions and the final won't be necessary.

== Championship ==
=== Taça Guanabara ===
==== Group A ====
Pos	Team	Pld	W	D	L	GF	GA	GD	Pts	Qualification or relegation
1	Volta Redonda	5	3	1	1	5	2	+3	10	Qualified to Semifinals
2	Botafogo	5	3	1	1	7	5	+2	10	Qualified to Semifinals
3	Vasco da Gama	5	2	2	1	8	5	+3	8	
4	Friburguense	5	2	1	2	5	6	−1	7	
5	América	5	1	2	2	6	8	−2	5	
6	Portuguesa	5	0	1	4	2	7	−5	1	

Updated to match(es) played on February 9, 2005. Source: RSSSF.com
Rules for classification: 1) points; 2) wins; 3) goal difference; 4) number of goals scored.

==== Group B ====
Pos	Team	Pld	W	D	L	GF	GA	GD	Pts	Qualification or relegation
1	Americano	5	4	0	1	8	4	+4	12	Qualified to Semifinals
2	Cabofriense	5	3	0	2	11	10	+1	9	Qualified to Semifinals
3	Madureira	5	3	0	2	6	6	0	9	
4	Fluminense	5	1	2	2	9	10	−1	5	
5	Olaria	5	1	1	3	8	8	0	4	
6	Flamengo	5	1	1	3	5	9	−4	4	

Updated to match(es) played on February 5, 2005. Source: RSSSF.com
Rules for classification: 1) points; 2) wins; 3) goal difference; 4) number of goals scored.

==== Semifinals ====
Team 1	Score	Team 2
Americano	2–1	Botafogo
Volta Redonda	2–0	Cabofriense

==== Finals ====
Team 1	Score	Team 2
Volta Redonda	0–0 (3-2 pen.)	Americano

=== Taça Rio ===
==== Group A ====
Pos	Team	Pld	W	D	L	GF	GA	GD	Pts	Qualification or relegation
1	Volta Redonda	6	4	1	1	15	10	+5	13	Qualified to Semifinals
2	Vasco da Gama	6	3	2	1	13	10	+3	11	Qualified to Semifinals
3	Botafogo	6	3	2	1	11	10	+1	11	
4	Portuguesa	6	3	0	3	5	8	−3	9	
5	Friburguense	6	1	2	3	8	12	−4	5	
6	América	6	1	2	3	4	9	−5	5	

Updated to match(es) played on March 23, 2005. Source: RSSSF.com
Rules for classification: 1) points; 2) wins; 3) goal difference; 4) number of goals scored.

==== Group B ====
Pos	Team	Pld	W	D	L	GF	GA	GD	Pts	Qualification or relegation
1	Fluminense	6	5	0	1	20	6	+14	15	Qualified to Semifinals
2	Flamengo	6	2	3	1	10	7	+3	9	Qualified to Semifinals
3	Americano	6	2	1	3	6	7	−1	7	
4	Cabofriense	6	2	1	3	11	15	−4	7	
5	Madureira	6	1	2	3	7	10	−3	5	
6	Olaria	6	0	2	4	5	11	−6	2	

Updated to match(es) played on March 23, 2005. Source: RSSSF.com
Rules for classification: 1) points; 2) wins; 3) goal difference; 4) number of goals scored.

==== Semifinals ====
Team 1	Score	Team 2
Fluminense	1–1 (8-7 pen.)	Vasco da Gama
Volta Redonda	0–1	Flamengo

==== Finals ====
Team 1	Score	Team 2
Fluminense	4–1	Flamengo

=== Championship finals ===
Team 1	Agg.	Team 2	1st leg	2nd leg
Volta Redonda	5–6	Fluminense	4–3	1–3

== Aggregate table ==
Pos	Team	Pld	W	D	L	GF	GA	GD	Pts	Qualification or relegation
1	Volta Redonda	11	7	2	2	20	12	+8	23	2006 Copa do Brasil and Série C
2	Botafogo	11	6	3	2	18	15	+3	21	
3	Fluminense	11	6	2	3	29	16	+13	20	
4	Americano	11	6	1	4	14	11	+3	19	2006 Copa do Brasil and Série C
5	Vasco da Gama	11	5	4	2	21	15	+6	19	
6	Cabofriense	11	5	1	5	22	25	−3	16	2006 Copa do Brasil and Série C
7	Madureira	11	4	2	5	13	16	−3	14	Série C
8	Flamengo	11	3	4	4	15	16	−1	13	
9	Friburguense	11	3	3	5	13	18	−5	12	
10	Portuguesa	11	3	1	7	7	15	−8	10	
11	América	11	2	4	5	10	17	−7	10	
12	Olaria	11	1	3	7	13	19	−6	6	Relegated

Updated to match(es) played on March 23, 2005. Source: RSSSF.com
Rules for classification: 1) points; 2) wins; 3) goal difference; 4) number of goals scored.
