= 1925 Campeonato Carioca =

Campeonato Carioca
- Season: 1925
- Champions: Flamengo
- Matches: 88
- Goals: 390 (4.43 per match)
- Top goalscorer: Nonô (Flamengo) – 27 goals
- Biggest home win: Bangu 7-1 Brasil (May 31, 1925); Flamengo 6-0 Brasil (July 12, 1925); Fluminense 6-0 Brasil (November 19, 1925)
- Biggest away win: Brasil 0-8 Flamengo (May 3, 1925)
- Highest scoring: Botafogo 8-4 Brasil (May 13, 1925)

The 1925 Campeonato Carioca, the twentieth edition of that championship, kicked off on April 26, 1925 and ended on December 20, 1925. It was organized by AMEA (Associação Metropolitana de Esportes Atléticos, or Metropolitan Athletic Sports Association). Ten teams participated. Flamengo won the title for the 5th time. No teams were relegated.

== Participating teams ==
Despite AMEA having CBD's official acknowledgement as the official Distrito Federal football league, due to Vasco da Gama's popularity, LMDT's league still had greater attendances, which led AMEA to invite Vasco into the league again, now with the requirements for their entry relaxed, but with the condition that the club didn't play its home matches at their field in the Moraes e Silva street and built an appropriate stadium, which would be completed in 1927. Aside from Vasco, Syrio e Libanez, that also had left LMDT in 1924 but hadn't been included in the 1924 championship entered the championship too. Vasco's exit from LMDT motivated some of the larger clubs in that league to join AMEA as well, but only Vasco was included in the First level, with the others joining the Second level. LMDT continued holding its own championships until 1934, but none of their championships held after 1924 are considered official.

Club	Home location	Previous season
América	Tijuca, Rio de Janeiro	6th
Bangu	Bangu, Rio de Janeiro	5th
Botafogo	Botafogo, Rio de Janeiro	4th
Brasil	Urca, Rio de Janeiro	8th
Flamengo	Flamengo, Rio de Janeiro	2nd
Fluminense	Laranjeiras, Rio de Janeiro	1st
Hellênico	Rio Comprido, Rio de Janeiro	7th
São Cristóvão	São Cristóvão, Rio de Janeiro	3rd
Syrio e Libanez	Tijuca, Rio de Janeiro	8th
Vasco da Gama	São Cristóvão, Rio de Janeiro	1st (LMDT)

== System ==
The tournament would be disputed in a double round-robin format, with the team with the most points winning the title.

== Championship ==
Pos	Team	Pld	W	D	L	GF	GA	GD	Pts	Qualification or relegation
1	Flamengo	18	14	3	1	61	18	+43	31	Champions
2	Fluminense	18	13	4	1	55	21	+34	30	
3	Vasco da Gama	18	13	3	2	57	25	+32	29	
4	Botafogo	18	10	2	6	43	36	+7	22	
5	América	18	8	2	8	29	32	−3	18	
6	São Cristóvão	18	7	1	10	42	43	−1	15	
7	Bangu	18	5	2	11	31	39	−8	12	
8	Syrio e Libanez	18	3	2	13	21	44	−23	8	
9	Hellênico	18	3	2	13	24	55	−31	8	Left the league after the end of the championship
10	Brasil	18	2	3	13	27	77	−50	7	

Updated to match(es) played on December 20, 1925. Source: RSSSF.com
Rules for classification: 1) points; 2) goal difference; 3) wins; 4) number of goals scored.
