= Jayme Barcelos =

Brazilian football manager

Jayme Barcelos was a Brazilian football manager who managed the Brazil national football team for five international matches in 1940.
