= Campeonato Carioca =

Football league in Brazil

- Organising body: FERJ
- Founded: 1906
- Country: Brazil
- State: (Rio de Janeiro (state)) Rio de Janeiro
- Level on pyramid: 1
- Relegation to: Campeonato Carioca Série A2
- Domestic cup: Copa Rio
- Current champions: Flamengo (40th title) (2026)
- Most championships: Flamengo (40 titles)
- Top scorer: Roberto Dinamite (284)
- Broadcasters: Rede Bandeirantes, BandSports, and ESPN (Broadcast); YouTube, Twitch and Dale (OTT)
- Website: www.fferj.com.br
- Current: 2026 Campeonato Carioca

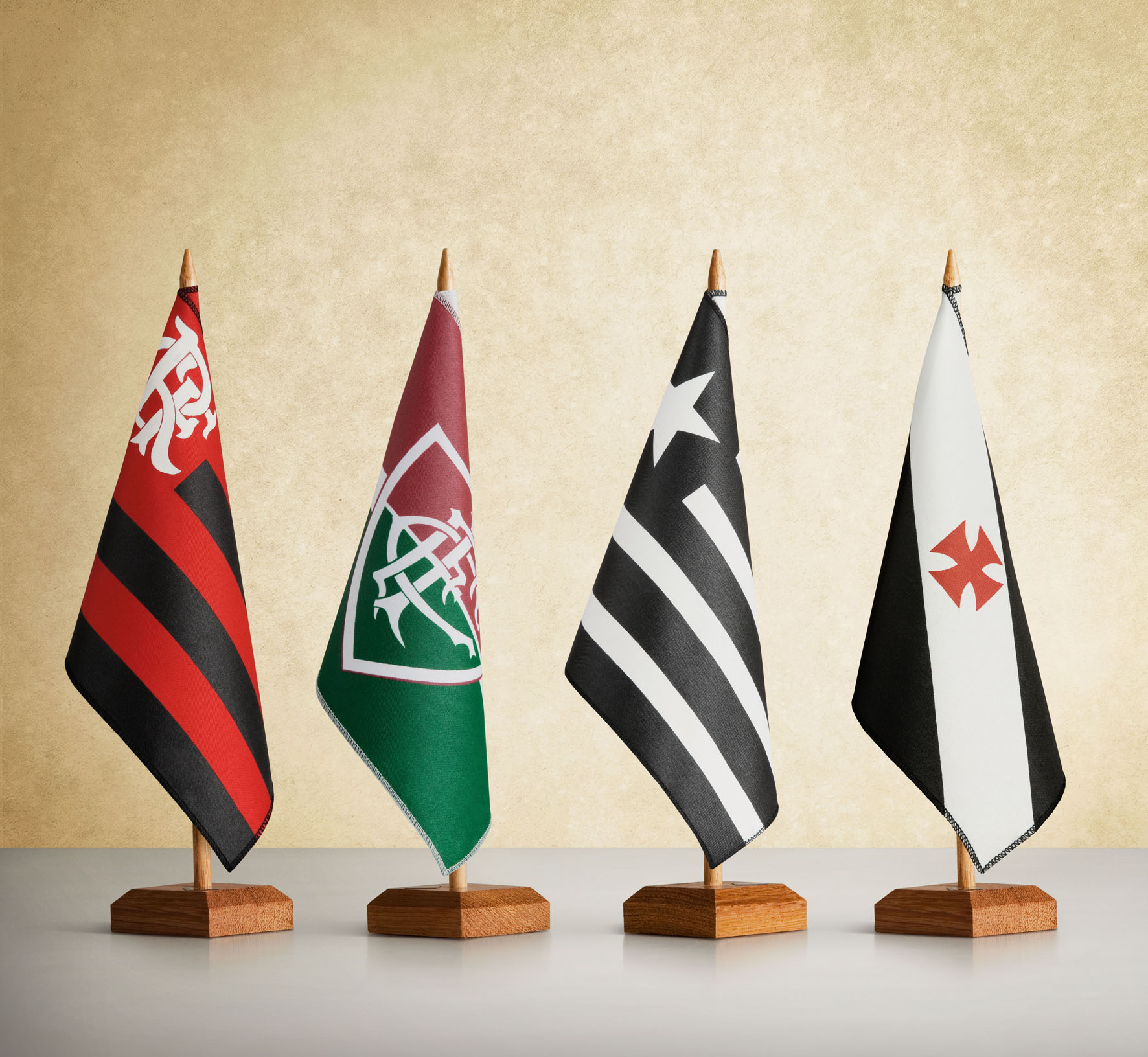
Flags of the Carioca's traditional "Big Four": Flamengo, Fluminense, Botafogo and Vasco da Gama.

The Campeonato Estadual do Rio de Janeiro (English: Rio de Janeiro State Championship), most known as Campeonato Carioca (Note: The word "carioca" is the gentilic given to people born in the city of Rio de Janeiro. Although it is the most popular demonym and, de facto, the one used to refer to people from the state of Rio de Janeiro.) and commonly as the Cariocão (Note: English: Big Carioca), is the top-flight professional state football league in the Brazilian state of Rio de Janeiro. It is run by the Rio de Janeiro State Football Federation (FERJ).

The first season of the Campeonato Carioca was played in 1906. Rivalries amongst four of the most prestigious Brazilian teams (Botafogo, Flamengo, Fluminense and Vasco da Gama) have marked the history of the competition. Flamengo leads the title count with 40, followed by Fluminense (33), Vasco da Gama (24), Botafogo (21), America (7), Bangu (2), São Cristóvão and Paissandu (1 each).

== History ==
=== The early years ===
The 20th century saw in Rio de Janeiro and Niterói a significant popularity in football with the establishment of clubs such as Rio Cricket and Athletic Association in Niterói, Fluminense Football Club in 1902, and Bangu Atlético Club, América Football Club, and Botafogo Football Club in 1904 being founded. Organizing leagues for competition amongst clubs followed by Rio Cricket and Athletic Association, Fluminense Football Club, Football and Athletic Club, America Football Club, Bangu Atlético Club, Sport Club Petrópolis and Payssandu Cricket Club. On June 8, 1905, the Liga Metropolitana de Football (abbreviated LMF, Metropolitan Football League in English) was founded. LMF's first president was Bangu's José Villas Boas, who was replaced by Francis Walter in December of the same year.

In 1906, the first Campeonato Carioca was contested by six clubs: Fluminense, Botafogo, Bangu, Football and Athletic, Payssandu and Rio Cricket. America, despite being one of the league founders, did not contest the league's first edition. Fluminense became the first Rio de Janeiro state champion.

In 1907, the championship ended with a tie between Botafogo and Fluminense. The league rules did not address ties. Botafogo claimed an extra-match advantage; Fluminense claimed that the league should adopt the goal-average criteria. It went unresolved until 1996 when both clubs were declared champions.

On 29 February 1908, Fluminense, Botafogo, America, Paysandu, Rio Cricket, and Riachuelo founded Liga Metropolitana de Sports Athleticos (LMSA, meaning Metropolitan Athletic Sports League), the organizer of the 1908 Campeonato Carioca. Fluminense won.

=== The splits of the league ===
The first league split was in 1911 when Botafogo left LMSA and founded Associação de Football do Rio de Janeiro (AFRJ - Rio de Janeiro Football Association). The league was nicknamed Liga Barbante (String League), because Botafogo was the only significant club to question the full realisation of the sport under LMSA. AFRJ was incorporated by LMSA in 1913.

In 1917, several accusations of bribery caused LMSA to rebrand as Liga Metropolitana de Desportos Terrestres (Terrestrial Sports Metropolitan League) (LMDT). Fluminense won the competition of that year.

On 1 March 1924, a second league split occurred, and Associação Metropolitana de Esportes Athleticos (Athletic Sports Metropolitan Association) was founded. AMEA, founded by the "aristocratic" clubs Flamengo, Fluminense, Botafogo and America, with restrictions on its blacks and lower class citizens to their members. The Confederação Brasileira de Desportos (CBD - Brazilian Sports Confederation) remained with AMEA recognising it as the official league of Rio de Janeiro from 1924 on, and disassociating with LMDT. AMEA's competition was won by Fluminense. LMDT's (The league was nicknamed Liga Barbante) (String League) competition was won by Vasco da Gama, the only significant club that remained on the old league. In 1925, AMEA rescinded its racial conditions and Vasco left LMDT, while LMDT continued with its minor clubs. Years later, the LMDT championship of 1924 was considered official - but not the following LMDT championships.

=== Professional era ===
On 23 January 1933, Bangu, Fluminense, Vasco and America founded the first professional league of Rio de Janeiro, Liga Carioca de Futebol (LCF) (Carioca Football League). The Confederação Brasileira de Desportos was an amateur-only league supported AMEA. For this reason, LCF was nicknamed "pirate league". In 1934 CBD finally accepted professionalism, but LCF and AMEA did not merge for political reasons. On December 11, 1934, Botafogo, Vasco, Bangu, São Cristóvão, Andaraí, Olaria, Carioca and Madureira founded the professional Federação Metropolitana de Desportos (FMD) (Sports Metropolitan Federation), replacing AMEA as the official Rio de Janeiro league affiliated to CBD.

In 1937, the Brazilian football clubs were professionalized. On 29 July 1937, FMD and LCF merged, creating Liga de Football do Rio de Janeiro (Rio de Janeiro Football League), also called LFRJ. In 1941, LFRJ rebranded as Federação Metropolitana de Futebol (FMF) (Metropolitan Football Federation). The occasion was celebrated by a friendly match between Vasco da Gama and America that would come to be nicknamed Clássico da Paz (Peace Derby) for any game played between the two teams.

On 21 April 1960, the Brazilian capital city became Brasília, so, Federação Metropolitana de Futebol rebranded as Federação Carioca de Futebol (FCF) (Carioca Football Federation). América won the state championship of that year.

On 15 March 1975, Rio de Janeiro and Guanabara states merged under the name of Rio de Janeiro.

On 29 September 1978, Federação de Futebol do Estado do Rio de Janeiro (Rio de Janeiro State Football Federation) (FERJ), was founded, after Guanabara state's FCF and Rio de Janeiro state's FFD (Federação Fluminense de Desportos, or Fluminense Sports Federation) fused.

In 1979, there was an extra Campeonato Carioca which also included the countryside state teams, which, until that year, contested the Campeonato Fluminense. This extra competition, known as Primeiro Campeonato Estadual de Profissionais (First Professionals State Championship) was won by Flamengo, which was also the champion of the regular competition, but did not count in the overall titles.

In 1996, Taça Cidade Maravilhosa was contested only by clubs from Rio de Janeiro city. This competition was contested by eight teams (America, Bangu, Botafogo, Flamengo, Fluminense, Madureira, Olaria and Vasco da Gama), which played against each other once. Botafogo was the champion, Flamengo being the runner up. In the same year, a state championship was played, won by Flamengo.

== Format ==
The competition is usually divided in three stages: the traditional Taça Guanabara, Taça Rio and the Finals.

Taça Guanabara is the first stage of the competition, with the teams divided into two groups. The traditional "big four", namely, Botafogo, Flamengo, Fluminense and Vasco da Gama are seeded—two teams of the "big four" put into each group. It is possible other teams also be seeded in some ways, but the seeding criteria are not codified in the regulation and has never been publicly available. The teams play one match with each team in their group. The top team in each group plays the second team in the semi-finals; the winners qualify for the final match.

Taça Rio is the second stage of the competition. Teams are divided into the two same groups of Taça Guanabara, but each team plays once against every team from the other group. The top team from each group compete in the semi-finals with the second team from the opposite group, and winners of the semi-finals compete for the Taça Rio.

The winners of Taça Guanabara and Taça Rio compete in the two-legged finals of Campeonato Carioca, with the winner champion.

== Current clubs ==
2025 First Division

Team	City	Ground	2024 result
Bangu	Rio de Janeiro (Bangu)	Moça Bonita	11th
Boavista	Saquarema	Elcyr Resende de Mendonça	6th
Botafogo	Rio de Janeiro (Botafogo)	Engenhão	5th
Flamengo	Rio de Janeiro (Gávea)	Maracanã	1st
Fluminense	Rio de Janeiro (Laranjeiras)	Maracanã	4th
Madureira	Rio de Janeiro (Madureira)	Conselheiro Galvão	9th
Maricá	Maricá	João Saldanha	1st (Série A2)
Nova Iguaçu	Nova Iguaçu	Laranjão	2nd
Portuguesa	Rio de Janeiro (Ilha do Governador)	Luso Brasileiro	7th
Sampaio Corrêa	Saquarema	Lourival de Almeida	8th
Vasco da Gama	Rio de Janeiro (Vasco da Gama)	São Januário	3rd
Volta Redonda	Volta Redonda	Raulino de Oliveira	10th

== List of champions ==
Source: RSSSF Brasil

Ed.	Season	Champion (titles count)	Runner-up	Winning manager	Top scorer	Goals
1	1906	Fluminense (1)	Paysandu (Note: Paysandu Cricket Club competed in the Campeonato Carioca from 1906 until 1914, when it discontinued its football team. The club eventually changed its name to Paissandu Atlético Clube and began playing other sports.)		(Brazil) Horácio da Costa (FLU)	18
2	1907	Botafogo (1), Fluminense (2) (Note: In 1996, both clubs, Botafogo and Fluminense, were declared champions, after more than 90 years of battles in the courts of law.)	Paysandu		(Brazil) Flávio Ramos (BOT)	6
3	1908	Fluminense (3)	Botafogo		(Brazil) Edwin Cox (FLU)	12
4	1909	Fluminense (4)	Botafogo		(Brazil) Flávio Ramos (BOT)	18
5	1910	Botafogo (2)	Fluminense		(Brazil) Abelardo de Lamare (BOT)	22
6	1911	Fluminense (5)	America	(England) Charlie Williams	(Brazil) James Calvert (FLU)	7
7	1912 (AFRJ)	Botafogo (3)	SC Americano		(Brazil) Mimi Sodré (BOT)	12
7	1912 (LMSA)	Paysandu (1)	Flamengo		(England) Harry Robinson (PAY)	24
8	1913	America (1)	Flamengo		(Brazil) Mimi Sodré (BOT)	13
9	1914	Flamengo (1)	Botafogo		(Brazil) Barthô (FLU)	10
10	1915	Flamengo (2)	Fluminense		(England) Henry Welfare (FLU)	19
11	1916	America (2)	Botafogo		(Brazil) Aluízio (BOT)	12
12	1917	Fluminense (6)	America	(England) Quincey Taylor	(Brazil) Luís Menezes (BOT)	16
13	1918	Fluminense (7)	Botafogo	(England) Quincey Taylor	(Brazil) Luís Menezes (BOT)	21
14	1919	Fluminense (8)	Flamengo	(Uruguay) Ramón Platero	(Brazil) Braz de Oliveira (SCR)	24
15	1920	Flamengo (3)	Fluminense		(Brazil) Arlindo (BOT), Claudionor (BAN)	18
16	1921	Flamengo (4)	America	(Brazil) Telefone	(Brazil) Cecy (VIS)	15
17	1922	America (3)	Flamengo		(Brazil) Braz de Oliveira (CAR)	15
18	1923	Vasco da Gama (1)	Flamengo	(Uruguay) Ramón Platero	(Brazil) Nonô (FLA)	17
19	1924 (AMEA)	Fluminense (9)	Flamengo	(England) Charlie Williams	(Brazil) Nilo (FLU)	28
19	1924 (LMDT)	Vasco da Gama (2)	Bonsucesso	(Uruguay) Ramón Platero	(Brazil) Telê (AND)	17
20	1925	Flamengo (5)	Fluminense	(Uruguay) Juan Carlos Bertone	(Brazil) Nonô (FLA)	27
21	1926	São Cristóvão (1)	Vasco da Gama	(Brazil) Luiz Vinhaes	(Brazil) Vicente (SCR)	25
22	1927	Flamengo (6)	Fluminense	(Uruguay) Juan Carlos Bertone	(Brazil) Nilo (BOT)	30
23	1928	America (4)	Vasco da Gama	(England) Charlie Williams	(Brazil) Vicente (SCR)	21
24	1929	Vasco da Gama (3)	America	(England) Henry Welfare	(Brazil) Russinho (VAS), Telê (AME)	23
25	1930	Botafogo (4)	Vasco da Gama	(Hungary) Nicolas Ladany	(Brazil) Preguinho (FLU), Ladislau da Guia (BAN)	20
26	1931	America (5)	Vasco da Gama	(Brazil) Jayme Barcellos	(Brazil) Russinho (VAS)	17
27	1932	Botafogo (5)	Flamengo	(Hungary) Nicolas Ladany	(Brazil) Preguinho (FLU)	21
28	1933 (AMEA)	Botafogo (6)	Olaria	(Brazil) Armindo Nobs	(Brazil) Nilo (BOT)	19
28	1933 (LCF)	Bangu (1)	Fluminense	(Brazil) Luiz Vinhaes	(Brazil) Tião (BAN)	13
29	1934 (AMEA)	Botafogo (7)	Andarahy	(Brazil) Armindo Nobs	(Brazil) Bianco (AND)	13
29	1934 (LCF)	Vasco da Gama (4)	São Cristóvão	(England) Henry Welfare	(Brazil) Alfredinho (FLA)	10
30	1935 (FMD)	Botafogo (8)	Vasco da Gama	(Brazil) Carlito Rocha	(Brazil) Ladislau da Guia (BAN)	18
30	1935 (LCF)	America (6)	Fluminense	(Chile) Fernando Ojeda	(Brazil) Emiliano Ramos (BON)	16
31	1936 (FMD)	Vasco da Gama (5)	Madureira	(England) Henry Welfare	(Brazil) Carvalho Leite (BOT)	15
31	1936 (LCF)	Fluminense (10)	Flamengo	(Uruguay) Carlos Carlomagno	(Brazil) Hércules (FLU)	23
32	1937 (FMD)	São Cristóvão (2)	Madureira		(Brazil) Carreiro, Caxambu and Roberto (SCR)	7
32	1937 (LFRJ)	Fluminense (11)	Flamengo	(Uruguay) Carlos Carlomagno	(Brazil) Niginho (VAS)	25
33	1938	Fluminense (12)	Flamengo	(Uruguay) Ondino Viera	(Brazil) Carvalho Leite (BOT)	16
34	1939	Flamengo (7)	Vasco da Gama	(Brazil) Flávio Costa	(Brazil) Carvalho Leite (BOT)	22
35	1940	Fluminense (13)	Flamengo	(Uruguay) Ondino Viera	(Brazil) Leônidas da Silva (FLA)	30
36	1941	Fluminense (14)	Flamengo	(Uruguay) Ondino Viera	(Brazil) Sylvio Pirillo (FLA)	39
37	1942	Flamengo (8)	Botafogo	(Brazil) Flávio Costa	(Brazil) Heleno de Freitas (BOT)	28
38	1943	Flamengo (9)	Fluminense	(Brazil) Flávio Costa	(Brazil) João Pinto (SCR)	26
39	1944	Flamengo (10)	Vasco da Gama	(Brazil) Flávio Costa	(Brazil) Geraldino (CDR)	19
40	1945	Vasco da Gama (6)	Botafogo	(Uruguay) Ondino Viera	(Brazil) Lelé (VAS)	13
41	1946	Fluminense (15)	Botafogo	(Brazil) Gentil Cardoso	(Brazil) Francisco Rodrigues (FLU)	28
42	1947	Vasco da Gama (7)	Botafogo	(Brazil) Flávio Costa	(Brazil) Dimas da Silva (VAS)	18
43	1948	Botafogo (9)	Vasco da Gama	(Brazil) Zezé Moreira	(Brazil) Orlando (FLU), Octávio Moraes (BOT)	21
44	1949	Vasco da Gama (8)	Fluminense	(Brazil) Flávio Costa	(Brazil) Ademir de Menezes (VAS)	31
45	1950	Vasco da Gama (9)	America	(Brazil) Flávio Costa	(Brazil) Ademir de Menezes (VAS)	25
46	1951	Fluminense (16)	Bangu	(Brazil) Zezé Moreira	(Brazil) Carlyle Guimarães (FLU)	23
47	1952	Vasco da Gama (10)	Flamengo	(Brazil) Gentil Cardoso	(Brazil) Antônio Menezes and Zizinho (BAN)	19
48	1953	Flamengo (11)	Fluminense	(Paraguay) Manuel Fleitas Solich	(Paraguay) Duilio Benítez (FLA)	22
49	1954	Flamengo (12)	America	(Paraguay) Manuel Fleitas Solich	(Brazil) Dino da Costa (BOT)	24
50	1955	Flamengo (13)	America	(Paraguay) Manuel Fleitas Solich	(Brazil) Paulinho (FLA)	23
51	1956	Vasco da Gama (11)	Fluminense	(Brazil) Martim Francisco	(Brazil) Waldo (FLU)	22
52	1957	Botafogo (10)	Fluminense	(Brazil) João Saldanha	(Brazil) Paulo Valentim (BOT)	22
53	1958	Vasco da Gama (12)	Flamengo	(Brazil) Gradim	(Brazil) Quarentinha (BOT)	20
54	1959	Fluminense (17)	Botafogo	(Brazil) Zezé Moreira	(Brazil) Quarentinha (BOT)	25
55	1960	America (7)	Fluminense	(Brazil) Jorge Vieira	(Brazil) Quarentinha (BOT)	25
56	1961	Botafogo (11)	Flamengo	(Brazil) Marinho Rodrigues	(Brazil) Amarildo (BOT)	18
57	1962	Botafogo (12)	Flamengo	(Brazil) Marinho Rodrigues	(Brazil) Saulzinho (VAS)	18
58	1963	Flamengo (14)	Fluminense	(Brazil) Flávio Costa	(Brazil) Adhemar Bianchini (BAN)	18
59	1964	Fluminense (18)	Bangu	(Brazil) Tim	(Brazil) José Amoroso (FLU)	19
60	1965	Flamengo (15)	Bangu	(Argentina) Armando Renganeschi	(Brazil) José Amoroso (FLU)	10
61	1966	Bangu (2)	Flamengo	(Argentina) Alfredo González	(Brazil) Paulo Borges (BAN)	16
62	1967	Botafogo (13)	Bangu	(Brazil) Mário Zagallo	(Brazil) Paulo Borges (BAN)	13
63	1968	Botafogo (14)	Flamengo	(Brazil) Mário Zagallo	(Brazil) Roberto Miranda (BOT)	13
64	1969	Fluminense (19)	Flamengo	(Brazil) Telê Santana	(Brazil) Flávio Minuano (FLU)	15
65	1970	Vasco da Gama (13)	Fluminense	(Brazil) Tim	(Brazil) Flávio Minuano (FLU)	16
66	1971	Fluminense (20)	Flamengo	(Brazil) Mário Zagallo	(Brazil) Paulo Cézar Caju (BOT)	11
67	1972	Flamengo (16)	Fluminense	(Brazil) Mário Zagallo	(Argentina) Narciso Doval (FLA)	16
68	1973	Fluminense (21)	Flamengo	(Brazil) Duque	(Brazil) Dadá Maravilha (FLA)	15
69	1974	Flamengo (17)	Vasco da Gama	(Brazil) Joubert Meira	(Brazil) Luisinho Lemos (AME)	20
70	1975	Fluminense (22)	Botafogo	(Brazil) Paulo Emílio	(Brazil) Zico (FLA)	30
71	1976	Fluminense (23)	Vasco da Gama	(Brazil) Mário Travaglini	(Argentina) Narciso Doval (FLU)	20
72	1977	Vasco da Gama (14)	Flamengo	(Brazil) Orlando Fantoni	(Brazil) Zico (FLA)	27
73	1978	Flamengo (18)	Vasco da Gama	(Brazil) Claúdio Coutinho	(Brazil) Cláudio Adão and Zico (FLA), Roberto Dinamite (VAS)	19
74	1979 (FFERJ)	Flamengo (19)	Fluminense	(Brazil) Claúdio Coutinho	(Brazil) Zico (FLA)	26
74	1979 (FCF)	Flamengo (20)	Vasco da Gama	(Brazil) Claúdio Coutinho	(Brazil) Zico (FLA)	34
75	1980	Fluminense (24)	Vasco da Gama	(Brazil) Nelsinho Rosa	(Brazil) Cláudio Adão (FLU)	20
76	1981	Flamengo (21)	Vasco da Gama	(Brazil) Paulo César Carpegiani	(Brazil) Roberto Dinamite (VAS)	31
77	1982	Vasco da Gama (15)	Flamengo	(Brazil) Antônio Lopes	(Brazil) Zico (FLA)	21
78	1983	Fluminense (25)	Flamengo	(Brazil) José Luiz Carbone	(Brazil) Luisinho Lemos (AME)	22
79	1984	Fluminense (26)	Flamengo	(Brazil) Carlos Alberto Parreira	(Brazil) Cláudio Adão (BAN), Baltazar (BOT)	12
80	1985	Fluminense (27)	Bangu	(Brazil) Nelsinho Rosa	(Brazil) Roberto Dinamite (VAS)	12
81	1986	Flamengo (22)	Vasco da Gama	(Brazil) Sebastião Lazaroni	(Brazil) Romário (VAS)	20
82	1987	Vasco da Gama (16)	Flamengo	(Brazil) Sebastião Lazaroni	(Brazil) Romário (VAS)	16
83	1988	Vasco da Gama (17)	Flamengo	(Brazil) Sebastião Lazaroni	(Brazil) Bebeto (FLA)	17
84	1989	Botafogo (15)	Flamengo	(Brazil) Valdir Espinosa	(Brazil) Bebeto (FLA)	18
85	1990	Botafogo (16)	Vasco da Gama	(Brazil) Joel Martins	(Brazil) Gaúcho (FLA)	14
86	1991	Flamengo (23)	Fluminense	(Brazil) Carlinhos Violino	(Brazil) Gaúcho (FLA)	17
87	1992	Vasco da Gama (18)	Flamengo	(Brazil) Joel Santana	(Brazil) Ézio (FLU)	15
88	1993	Vasco da Gama (19)	Fluminense	(Brazil) Joel Santana	(Brazil) Valdir Bigode (VAS)	19
89	1994	Vasco da Gama (20)	Flamengo	(Brazil) Jair Pereira	(Brazil) Túlio Maravilha (BOT), Charles Fabian (FLA)	14
90	1995	Fluminense (28)	Flamengo	(Brazil) Joel Santana	(Brazil) Túlio Maravilha (BOT)	27
91	1996	Flamengo (24)	Vasco da Gama	(Brazil) Joel Santana	(Brazil) Romário (FLA)	26
92	1997	Botafogo (17)	Vasco da Gama	(Brazil) Joel Santana	(Brazil) Romário (FLA)	18
93	1998	Vasco da Gama (21)	Flamengo	(Brazil) Antônio Lopes	(Brazil) Romário (FLA)	10
94	1999	Flamengo (25)	Vasco da Gama	(Brazil) Carlinhos Violino	(Brazil) Romário (FLA)	16
95	2000	Flamengo (26)	Vasco da Gama	(Brazil) Carlinhos Violino	(Brazil) Romário (VAS)	19
96	2001	Flamengo (27)	Vasco da Gama	(Brazil) Mário Zagallo	(Brazil) Edílson (FLA)	16
97	2002	Fluminense (29)	Americano	(Brazil) Waldemar Lemos	(Brazil) Fábio (VRE)	16
98	2003	Vasco da Gama (22)	Fluminense	(Brazil) Antônio Lopes	(Brazil) Fábio Bala (FLU)	10
99	2004	Flamengo (28)	Vasco da Gama	(Brazil) Abel Braga	(Brazil) Valdir Bigode (VAS)	14
100	2005	Fluminense (30)	Volta Redonda	(Brazil) Abel Braga	(Brazil) Túlio Maravilha (VRE)	12
101	2006	Botafogo (18)	Madureira	(Brazil) Carlos Roberto	(Brazil) Dodô (BOT)	9
102	2007	Flamengo (29)	Botafogo	(Brazil) Ney Franco	(Brazil) Dodô (BOT), Marcelo Macedo (MAD)	13
103	2008	Flamengo (30)	Botafogo	(Brazil) Joel Santana	(Brazil) Wellington Paulista (BOT)	14
104	2009	Flamengo (31)	Botafogo	(Brazil) Cuca	(Brazil) Maicosuel (BOT)	12
105	2010	Botafogo (19)	Vasco da Gama	(Brazil) Joel Santana	(Brazil) Vágner Love (FLA)	15
106	2011	Flamengo (32)	Fluminense	(Brazil) Vanderlei Luxemburgo	(Brazil) Thiago Neves (FLA)	8
107	2012	Fluminense (31)	Botafogo	(Brazil) Abel Braga	(Brazil) Somália (BOA), Alecsandro (VAS)	12
108	2013	Botafogo (20)	Fluminense	(Brazil) Oswaldo de Oliveira	(Brazil) Hernane (FLA)	12
109	2014	Flamengo (33)	Vasco da Gama	(Brazil) Jayme de Almeida	(Brazil) Edmílson (VAS)	11
110	2015	Vasco da Gama (23)	Botafogo	(Brazil) Doriva	(Brazil) Fred (FLU)	11
111	2016	Vasco da Gama (24)	Botafogo	(Brazil) Jorginho	(Brazil) Tiago Amaral (VRE)	10
112	2017	Flamengo (34)	Fluminense	(Brazil) Zé Ricardo	(Peru) Paolo Guerrero (FLA)	10
113	2018	Botafogo (21)	Vasco da Gama	(Brazil) Alberto Valentim	(Brazil) Pedro (FLU)	7
114	2019	Flamengo (35)	Vasco da Gama	(Brazil) Abel Braga	(Brazil) Bruno Henrique (FLA)	8
115	2020	Flamengo (36)	Fluminense	(Portugal) Jorge Jesus	(Brazil) Gabriel Barbosa (FLA), João Carlos (VRE)	8
116	2021	Flamengo (37)	Fluminense	(Brazil) Rogério Ceni	(Brazil) Alef Manga (VRE)	9
117	2022	Fluminense (32)	Flamengo	(Brazil) Abel Braga	(Brazil) Gabriel Barbosa (FLA)	9
118	2023	Fluminense (33)	Flamengo	(Brazil) Fernando Diniz	(Argentina) Germán Cano (FLU)	16
119	2024	Flamengo (38)	Nova Iguaçu	(Brazil) Tite	(Brazil) Pedro (FLA)	11
120	2025	Flamengo (39)	Fluminense	(Brazil) Filipe Luís	(Argentina) Germán Cano (FLU), Pablo Vegetti (VAS), (Brazil) Max (SCO)	6
121	2026	Flamengo (40)	Fluminense	(Portugal) Leonardo Jardim	(Brazil) Patryck Ferreira (BAN), (Brazil) Pedro (FLA)	6

== Titles by club ==
Club	Winners	Runners-up	Winning years
Flamengo	40	33	1914, 1915, 1920, 1921, 1925, 1927, 1939, 1942, 1943, 1944, 1953, 1954, 1955, 1963, 1965, 1972, 1974, 1978, 1979 Special, 1979, 1981, 1986, 1991, 1996, 1999, 2000, 2001, 2004, 2007, 2008, 2009, 2011, 2014, 2017, 2019, 2020, 2021, 2024, 2025, 2026
Fluminense	33	25	1906, 1907 (shared), 1908, 1909, 1911, 1917, 1918, 1919, 1924 (AMEA), 1936 (LCF), 1937 (LFRJ), 1938, 1940, 1941, 1946, 1951, 1959, 1964, 1969, 1971, 1973, 1975, 1976, 1980, 1983, 1984, 1985, 1995, 2002, 2005, 2012, 2022, 2023
Vasco da Gama	24	25	1923, 1924 (LMDT), 1929, 1934 (LCF), 1936 (FMD), 1945, 1947, 1949, 1950, 1952, 1956, 1958, 1970, 1977, 1982, 1987, 1988, 1992, 1993, 1994, 1998, 2003, 2015, 2016
Botafogo	21	20	1907 (shared), 1910, 1912 (AFRJ), 1930, 1932, 1933 (AMEA), 1934 (AMEA), 1935 (FMD), 1948, 1957, 1961, 1962, 1967, 1968, 1989, 1990, 1997, 2006, 2010, 2013, 2018
America	7	7	1913, 1916, 1922, 1928, 1931, 1935 (LCF), 1960
Bangu	2	6	1933 (LCF), 1966
São Cristóvão	2	1	1926, 1937 (FMD)
Paissandu	1	1	1912 (LMSA)

== Records and statistics ==
=== Most appearances by club ===
As of 2025 season (including 1937 FMD Championship)

Below is the list of clubs that have more appearances in the Campeonato Carioca.

Club	App	First	Last
Botafogo	122	1906	2025
Fluminense	121	1906	2025
Flamengo	115	1912	2025
Bangu	111	1906	2025
America	109	1908	2021
Vasco da Gama	107	1921	2025
Madureira	83	1924	2025
São Cristóvão	74	1912	1995
Olaria	66	1924	2013
Bonsucesso	65	1924	2018
Portuguesa	52	1933	2025
Volta Redonda	46	1976	2025
Americano	40	1976	2021
Campo Grande	31	1924	1995

=== Most titles by player ===
The following list includes the players with the most titles won.

Rank	Player	Titles	Seasons won
1.	(Brazil) Oswaldo Gomes	8	Fluminense (1906, 1907, 1908, 1909, 1911, 1917, 1918, 1919)
2.	(Brazil) Zico	7	Flamengo (1972, 1974, 1978, 1979, 1979 Special, 1981, 1986)
3.	(Brazil) Nilo	6	Fluminense (1924), Botafogo (1930, 1932, 1933, 1934, 1935)
3.	(Brazil) Moacir Barbosa	6	Vasco da Gama (1945, 1947, 1949, 1950, 1952, 1958)
3.	(Brazil) Paulo Cézar	6	Botafogo (1967, 1968), Flamengo (1972, 1974), Fluminense (1975, 1976)
3.	(Brazil) Toninho	6	Fluminense (1971, 1973, 1975), Flamengo (1978, 1979, 1979 Special)
3.	(Brazil) Cantarele	6	Flamengo (1974, 1978, 1979, 1979 Special, 1981, 1986)
3.	(Brazil) Léo Júnior	6	Flamengo (1974, 1978, 1979, 1979 Special, 1981, 1991)
3.	(Brazil) Luisinho	6	Botafogo (1989, 1990), Vasco da Gama (1992, 1993, 1994, 1998)
3.	(Brazil) Leandro Ávila	6	Vasco da Gama (1992, 1993, 1994), Flamengo (1999, 2000, 2001)
3.	(Brazil) Bruno Henrique	6	Flamengo (2019, 2020, 2021, 2024, 2025, 2026)
3.	(Uruguay) Giorgian de Arrascaeta	6	Flamengo (2019, 2020, 2021, 2024, 2025, 2026)

=== Most goals by player ===
The following list includes the top scorers in the history of the competition.

Rank	Player	Goals	Clubs played
1.	(Brazil) Roberto Dinamite	284	Vasco da Gama
2.	(Brazil) Zico	239	Flamengo
3.	(Brazil) Romário	233	Vasco da Gama, Flamengo, Fluminense
4.	(Brazil) Ademir de Menezes	197	Vasco da Gama, Fluminense
5.	(Brazil) Nilo	196	Botafogo, Fluminense
6.	(Brazil) Ladislau da Guia	172	Bangu, Canto do Rio
7.	(Brazil) Carvalho Leite	166	Botafogo
8.	(Brazil) Russinho	164	Andarahy, Vasco da Gama, Botafogo
9.	(Brazil) Luisinho Lemos	156	America, Flamengo, Botafogo, Americano
10.	(Brazil) Zizinho	153	Flamengo, Bangu
11.	(Brazil) Sylvio Pirillo	151	Flamengo, Botafogo
12.	(Brazil) Quarentinha	149	Botafogo, Bonsucesso
13.	(Brazil) Heleno de Freitas	133	Botafogo, Vasco da Gama
14.	(Brazil) Leônidas da Silva	125	Syrio e Libanez, Bonsucesso, Botafogo, Flamengo
15.	(England) Henry Welfare	123	Fluminense

== Annual awards ==
The awards are given by the FERJ.

Season	Best Player	Best GK	Best young player	Best coach
1995	Renato (Fluminense) (Note: Renato was awarded the King of Rio over Romario, Tulio Maravilha and Valdir Bigode.)	-	-	-
2005	Gabriel (Fluminense)	Leandro Coelho Lugão (Volta Redonda)	Schneider Cordeiro da Silva (Volta Redonda)	Dário Lourenço (Volta Redonda)
2008	Lúcio Flávio (Botafogo)	Bruno (Flamengo)	-	Joel Santana (Flamengo)
2009	Maicosuel (Botafogo)	Bruno (Flamengo)	-	Cuca (Flamengo)
2010	Jefferson (Botafogo)	Jefferson (Botafogo)	-	Joel Santana (Botafogo)
2011	Thiago Neves (Flamengo)	Felipe (Flamengo)	-	Vanderlei Luxemburgo (Flamengo)
2012	Deco (Fluminense)	Diego Cavalieri (Fluminense)	-	Abel Braga (Fluminense)
2013	Clarence Seedorf (Botafogo)	Jefferson (Botafogo)	-	Oswaldo de Oliveira (Botafogo)
2015	Luan Garcia (Vasco da Gama)	Martin Silva (Vasco da Gama)		Doriva (Vasco da Gama)
2016	Nenê (Vasco da Gama)	Martin Silva (Vasco da Gama)		Jorginho (Vasco da Gama)
2017	Paolo Guerrero (Flamengo)	Martin Silva (Vasco da Gama)	Wendel (Fluminense)	Abel Braga (Fluminense)
2018	Paulinho (Vasco da Gama)	Júlio César (Fluminense)	Paulinho (Vasco da Gama)	Zé Ricardo (Vasco da Gama)
2019	Éverton Ribeiro (Flamengo)	Jefferson Paulino (Bangu)	Tiago Reis (Vasco da Gama)	Fernando Diniz (Fluminense)
2020	Gabriel Barbosa (Flamengo)	Douglas Borges (Volta Redonda)		Jorge Jesus (Flamengo) and Odair Hellmann (Fluminense)
2021	Gabriel Barbosa (Flamengo)	Marcos Felipe (Fluminense)	Kayky (Fluminense)	Felipe Surian (Portuguesa)
2022	Giorgian De Arrascaeta (Flamengo)	Thiago Rodrigues (Vasco da Gama)		Abel Braga (Fluminense)
2023	Germán Cano (Fluminense)	Fabio (Fluminense)	Lele (Fluminense)	Fernando Diniz (Fluminense)
2024	Giorgian De Arrascaeta (Flamengo)	Agustín Rossi (Flamengo)	Yago (Nova Iguaçu)	Carlos Vitor (Nova Iguaçu)

=== Best XI of the 21st Century ===
On 18 April 2020 distinguished Brazilian newspaper O Globo announced the best XI of the 21st Century via a poll. Romario received most of the votes.

- Goalkeeper: Júlio César
- Defenders: Thiago Silva, Juan, Dedé
- Midfielders: Marcelo, Juninho Pernambucano, Rafinha, Dejan Petković
- Forwards: Romario, Adriano, Edmundo

== See also ==
- Campeonato Carioca Série A2
- Taça Guanabara
- Taça Rio
- Copa Rio
