= Luiz Vinhaes =

Brazilian football manager (1896–1960)

Luis Vinhaes
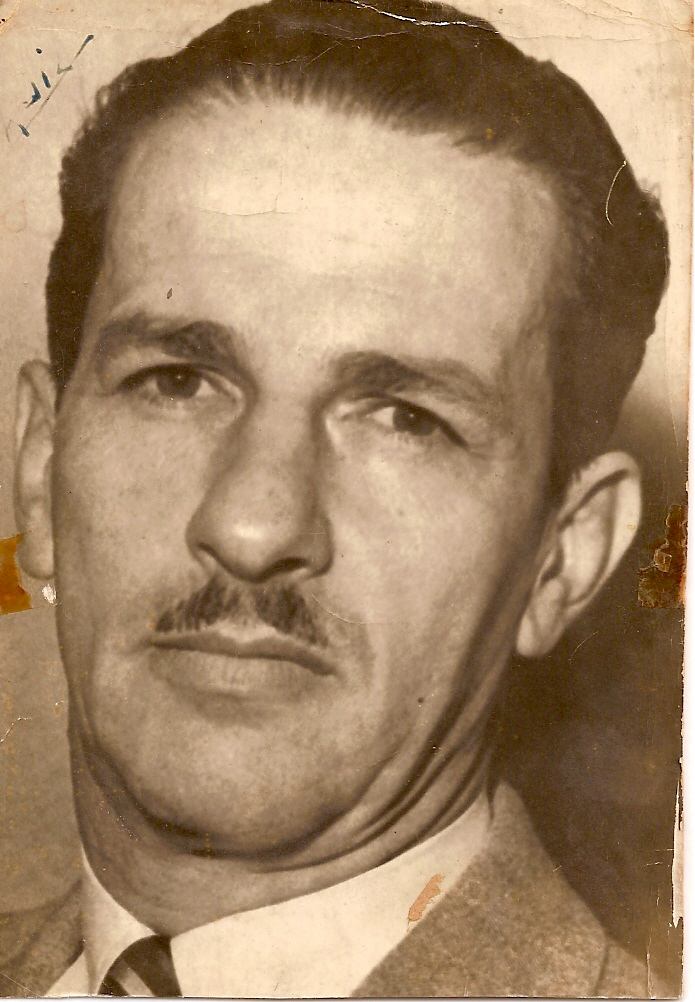

Personal information
- Full name: Luis Augusto Vinhaes
- Date of birth: 10 December 1896
- Place of birth: Rio de Janeiro (RJ), Brazil
- Date of death: 3 April 1960 (aged 63)
- Place of death: Rio de Janeiro (RJ), Brazil

Managerial career
- Years: Team
- 1926: São Cristóvão
- 1929–1933: Fluminense
- 1931–1934: Brazil
- 1933–1934: Bangu
- 1949: Brazil U20

Luiz Augusto Vinhaes (10 December 1896 – 3 April 1960) was a Brazilian football player and manager. At the 1934 FIFA World Cup he was the Brazil national team coach. As a player he was associated with São Cristóvão AC of the late 1910s and early 1920s.

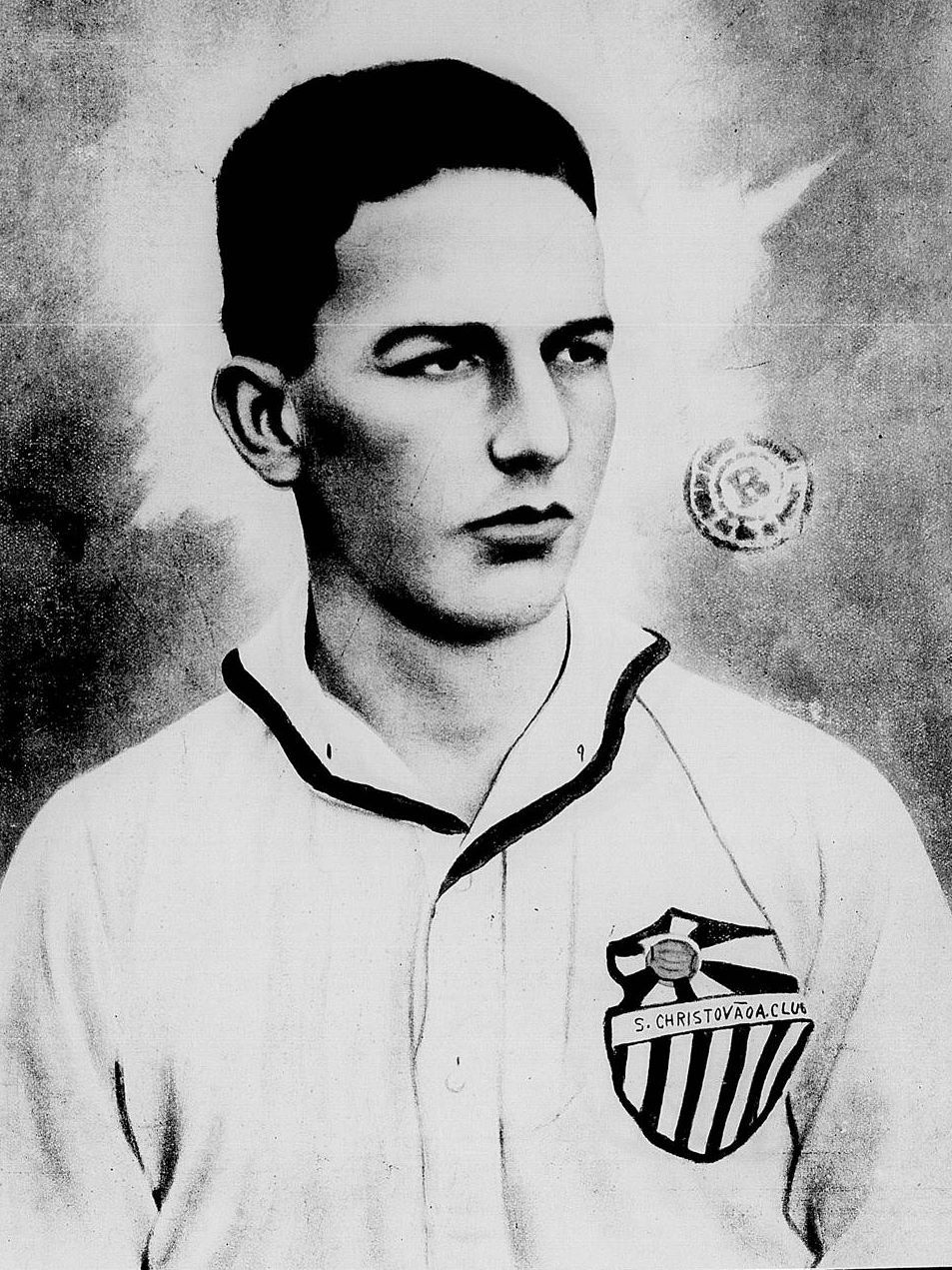
Luiz Vinhaes as player of São Cristóvão AC (1920)

== Honours ==
São Cristóvão

- Campeonato Carioca: 1926

Bangu

- Campeonato Carioca: 1933
