= Luís Menezes =

Brazilian footballer

Luís Maia de Bittencourt Menezes
Personal information
- Date of birth: 1 April 1897
- Place of birth: Salvador, Brazil
- Position: Outside right

Senior career*
Years	Team	Apps	(Gls)
1913–1921	Botafogo		

International career
1916–1919	Brazil	5	(0)
Medal record
Men's football
Representing Brazil
South American Championship
Winner	1919 Brazil
Third place	1916 Argentina
- * Club domestic league appearances and goals

Luís Maia de Bittencourt Menezes (born 1 April 1897, date of death unknown) was a Brazilian footballer who played as a forward. He played in five matches for the Brazil national football team from 1916 to 1919. He was also part of Brazil's squad for the 1916 and 1919 South American Championship.

== Honours ==
Brazil

- Copa América: 1919
