= Paissandu Atlético Clube =

Sports club in Brazil

Paissandu
- Full name: Paissandu Atlético Clube
- Founded: 15 August 1872; 154 years ago
- Website: https://www.paissandu.net/
Home colours	Away colours

Paissandu Atlético Clube is a sports club from the Brazilian metropolis of Rio de Janeiro. Initially the club was based in the Paissandu street, in the Flamengo neighborhood. Since 1953 it is at home in the Leblon neighborhood.

Nowadays Paissandu hosts a wide range of sports and social activities, including bowls, cross training, dancing, darts, futsal, gymnastics, pilates, squash, swimming, tennis, water aerobics, weight training, and yoga.

The football team of the club participated from 1906 to 1914 in the Campeonato Carioca and won the competition in 1912.

== History ==
Paissandu was founded on July 29, 1906 as Paysandu Cricket Club. The football team of Paysandu played 73 Campeonato Carioca games between 1906 and 1914. They won the Campeonato Carioca in 1912, defeating CR Flamengo in the final. The club closed its football department in 1914, and eventually was renamed to Paissandu Atlético Clube.

== Honours ==
- Campeonato Carioca
  - Winners (1): 1912
  - Runners-up (1): 1906
- Campeonato Carioca Série A2
  - Winners (1): 1910
