= Sport Club Mangueira =

Mangueira
- Full name: Sport Club Mangueira
- Nickname(s): Rubro-negro tijucano
- Founded: 26 July 1906; 118 years ago
- Dissolved: 1927
Home colors	Away colors

Sport Club Mangueira, commonly known as Mangueira, was a Brazilian football team from Rio de Janeiro. They competed several times in the Campeonato Carioca.

== History ==
They were founded on 29 July 1906. Mangueira played 96 Campeonato Carioca games between 1909 and 1920. Mangueira suffered Brazilian football's largest goal margin on 30 May 1909, when they were defeated 24–0 by Botafogo. The game was played at Campo da Rua Voluntários da Pátria. Flamengo's first game ever was a Campeonato Carioca game played against Mangueira on 3 May 1912. Flamengo won 16–2. The club folded in 1927.
