= Andaraí, Rio de Janeiro =

Andaraí
- Neighborhood
- Location in Rio de Janeiro Andaraí (Brazil)
- Coordinates: 22°55′21″S 43°14′00″W
- Country: Brazil
- State: Rio de Janeiro (RJ)
- Municipality/City: Rio de Janeiro
- Zone: North Zone

Andaraí is a neighborhood in the North Zone of Rio de Janeiro, Brazil.
