= List of CR Flamengo seasons =

The current club's logo, adopted in 2018.

Clube de Regatas do Flamengo, more commonly known as simply Flamengo, is a Brazilian sports club based in Rio de Janeiro, in the neighborhood of Gávea, best known for their professional football team that plays in the Campeonato Brasileiro Série A, as well as the Campeonato Carioca. The following list covers the period from 1912 (when the club joined the Campeonato Carioca) to the present day. It details the club's achievements in all major league and cup competitions, and the top scorers for each season.

== Background ==
Flamengo was founded on 17 November 1895, by a group of rowers gathered at club member Nestor de Barros's manor on Flamengo Beach in Rio de Janeiro. In the late 19th century, rowing was the elite, upper middle class sport in the region and the group hoped to impress the young women of the city's high society by establishing a rowing club.

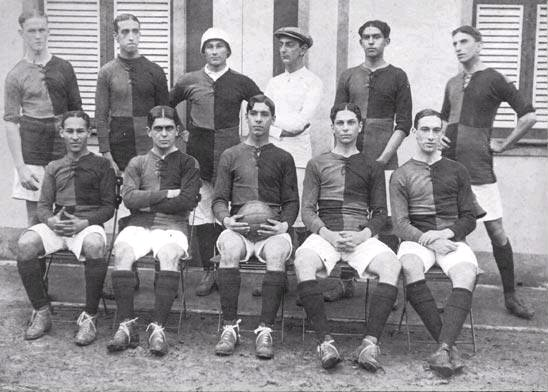
The recently formed football (soccer) team before a match vs. Paissandu, 1912.

Flamengo's football team was only established after a group of ten dissatisfied players from Fluminense broke away from that club following a dispute with its board. The players decided to join Flamengo because Alberto Borgerth, the team's captain, was also a rower for Flamengo. Also, establishing a land sports department at Flamengo was preferable to joining football rivals Botafogo or the all-English club Paysandu (now, Paissandu). The new members were admitted on 8 November 1911. A motion against the club taking part in football tournaments was put to a vote but was defeated, and as a result the members officially established the club's new football department on 24 December 1911.

Since then, Flamengo established themselves as one of Brazil's most successful sports clubs in the 20th century during the era of state leagues in Brazil when they captured several Campeonato Carioca (Rio de Janeiro state league) titles prior to the establishment of the first Brazilian national football championship in 1959. Since then, they have remained successful in Brazilian football, having won eight times the Campeonato Brasileiro Série A, the 1987 Copa União (a Brasileirão title contested by Sport, although CBF recognizes both champions, the STF does not.), five times the Copa do Brasil, three times the Supercopa do Brasil, and a record 40 times the Campeonato Carioca, including three consecutive titles on seven occasions. They are one of the only three clubs to have never been relegated from the Brazilian Série A, along with São Paulo and recently promoted Mirassol. In South American and worldwide competitions, the club's highest achievements are their conquests of the 1981, 2019, 2022 and 2025 Copa Libertadores, and 1981 Intercontinental Cup against English-side Liverpool, led by the club's most iconic player Zico, in addition to the 1999 Copa Mercosul, the 1996 Copa de Oro and the 2020 Recopa Sudamericana. Flamengo's fiercest and longest-standing rivalries are with the other "Big Four" of Rio de Janeiro: Fluminense, Botafogo and Vasco da Gama. Throughout their history, they also had rivalries with clubs from other states, most notably with Atlético Mineiro, Corinthians and Palmeiras.

Flamengo is the most popular club in Brazil, with over 40.2 million supporters as of 2020. It is also Brazil's richest and most valuable football club with an annual revenue of R$950.0 million (€163.04 million) and a valuation of over R$2.9 billion (€469.21 million).

== Key ==
Key to divisions and league record:

- Pld = Matches played
- W = Matches won
- D = Matches drawn
- L = Matches lost
- GF = Goals for
- GA = Goals against
- GD = Goal difference
- Pts = Points
- Pos = Final position
- Wtd = Withdrew
- DNQ = Did not qualify

Key to rounds:

- GS = Group stage
- R1 = First round
- R2 = Second round
- R3 = Third round
- R32 = Round of 32
- R16 = Round of 16
- QF = Quarter-finals
- SF = Semi-finals
- FS = Final stage
- F = Final (yet to be disputed)
- RU = Runners-up
- W = Winners

Winners	Runners-up	3rd place or Semifinalists

Top scorer in the Campeonato Carioca
Top scorer in the Brazilian Série A
Top scorer in both tournaments

Top scorers shown in bold are players who were also top scorers in their division that season.
Informations in italics are about the current season, which are being updated as the season goes on.

== Seasons ==
Correct as of 21 November 2026. (Note: Until 1994, two points were awarded for a win, and one for a draw. In some of the Brasileirão seasons, extra points were awarded for goal difference (1975 to 1978) or a penalty shootout (1988). From the 1995 season onwards, three points have been awarded for a win.)

Seasons of CR Flamengo
Season	League										Copa do Brasil	International		National and regional tournaments		Top scorer(s) (Note: Figures include goals in all the tournaments depicted.)	
Season	Division	Pld	W	D	L	GF	GA	GD	Pts	Pos	Copa do Brasil	International		National and regional tournaments		Player(s)	Goals
1912	Carioca	14	10	2	2	65	16	49	**22**	2nd						Arnaldo	16
1913	Carioca	15	10	2	3	33	12	21	**22**	2nd						Gumercindo	9
1914	Carioca	12	8	3	1	24	15	9	**19**	**1st**						Ricardo Riemer	8
1915	Carioca	12	8	4	0	35	11	24	**20**	**1st**				Taça dos Campeões Rio–São Paulo	RU	Ricardo Riemer	15
1916	Carioca	12	4	3	5	23	22	1	**11**	4th						Gumercindo	5
1917	Carioca	18	12	2	4	44	25	19	**26**	3rd						Juarez Nery	15
1918	Carioca	18	9	3	6	55	43	12	**21**	4th						Geraldo	9
1919	Carioca	18	13	2	3	51	21	30	**28**	2nd						(England) Sidney Pullen	12
1920	Carioca	18	13	5	0	44	19	25	**31**	**1st**						Junqueira	15
1921	Carioca	12	5	5	2	33	24	9	**15**	**1st**						Nonô	11
1922	Carioca	12	7	3	2	24	11	13	**17**	2nd						Nonô	8
1923	Carioca	14	8	3	3	39	23	16	**19**	2nd						**Nonô**	**17**
1924	Carioca	14	10	2	2	44	21	23	**22**	2nd						Junqueira	14
1925	Carioca	18	14	3	1	61	18	43	**31**	**1st**						**Nonô**	**29**
1926	Carioca	18	7	5	6	53	40	13	**19**	5th						Fragoso	18
1927	Carioca	18	13	2	3	47	32	15	**28**	**1st**						Fragoso	13
1928	Carioca	19	12	0	7	49	35	14	**24**	3rd						Angenor	12
1929	Carioca	20	4	4	12	26	42	−16	**12**	10th						Angenor	6
1930	Carioca	20	6	0	14	37	41	−4	**12**	8th						Vicentino	9
1931	Carioca	20	10	1	9	30	46	−16	**21**	6th						Adelino	8
1932	Carioca	22	13	5	4	50	30	20	**31**	2nd						Nelson	19
1933	Carioca	3	2	1	0	21	6	15	**5**	Wtd (Note: Two championships were disputed simultaneously in 1933, each by a different league. The AMEA defended the maintenance of amateurism in the sport, while the LCF adopted the professionalism, thus organizing the first professional Campeonato Carioca. Flamengo initially competed in the AMEA championship, but only four weeks after the tournament's start, they left AMEA and were accepted in the LCF championship, although they couldn't join the Torneio Rio–São Paulo like the other participants. The results of their matches in the AMEA championship were disregarded.)				Torneio Rio–São Paulo	DNQ	Nelson	9
1933	Carioca	10	2	1	7	13	20	−7	**5**	6th				Torneio Rio–São Paulo	DNQ	Nelson	9
1934	Carioca	12	4	2	6	35	29	6	**10**	6th				Torneio Extra	**1st**	Alfredinho	25 (Note: Nelson was the Campeonato Carioca top scorer, with 10 goals.)
1935	Carioca	15	8	4	3	36	22	14	**20**	3rd				Torneio Aberto	3rd	Alfredinho	22
1936	Carioca	18	10	5	3	48	23	25	**25**	2nd				Torneio Aberto	**1st**	Alfredinho	21
1937	Carioca	22	15	5	2	83	34	49	**35**	2nd				Torneio Aberto	FS (Note: The Torneio Aberto was a tournament organized by the Liga Carioca de Football (LCF), the then professional football league in Rio de Janeiro, with the main goal of attracting amateur clubs to professionalism in the national capital, as well as measuring forces with them and with teams from other states. In 1937, though, when Fluminense were leading the competition, it was suddenly terminated, due to the union of the two rival leagues at the time, sealing the pacification and the professionalism in the Federal District.)	Jarbas	22
1937	Série A	–	–	–	–	–	–	–	–	DNQ				Torneio Aberto	FS	Jarbas	22
1938	Carioca	16	10	2	4	47	22	25	**22**	2nd				Torneio Municipal	8th	**Leônidas**	**18**
1938	Carioca	16	10	2	4	47	22	25	**22**	2nd				Torneio Extra	3rd	**Leônidas**	**18**
1939	Carioca	24	16	4	4	67	34	33	**36**	**1st**						(Argentina) Alfredo González (Argentina) Agustín Valido	13
1940	Carioca	24	17	3	4	72	30	42	**37**	2nd				Torneio Rio–São Paulo	**1st** (Note: The 1940 Torneio Rio–São Paulo did not reach its end. It was interrupted with only one round of matches, with each team playing eight matches. Although there was no official champion, the Diário da Noite newspaper, of 7 April 1959, reports that the disputing clubs considered the result definitive and declared Fluminense and Flamengo — who were both leading the competition — the champions.)	**Leônidas**	**36**
1941	Carioca	28	20	4	4	85	32	53	**44**	2nd				Torneio Extra	4th	**Sylvio Pirillo**	**39**
1942	Carioca	27	20	5	2	87	29	58	**45**	**1st**				Taça dos Campeões Rio–São Paulo	RU	Sylvio Pirillo	23
1943	Carioca	18	11	6	1	51	18	33	**28**	**1st**				Torneio Relâmpago	**1st**	Sylvio Pirillo	19
1943	Carioca	18	11	6	1	51	18	33	**28**	**1st**				Torneio Municipal	6th	Sylvio Pirillo	19
1943	Carioca	18	11	6	1	51	18	33	**28**	**1st**				Taça dos Campeões Rio–São Paulo	RU	Sylvio Pirillo	19
1944	Carioca	18	13	2	3	50	18	32	**28**	**1st**				Torneio Relâmpago	4th	Sylvio Pirillo	18
1944	Carioca	18	13	2	3	50	18	32	**28**	**1st**				Torneio Municipal	5th	Sylvio Pirillo	18
1945	Carioca	18	11	3	4	55	26	29	**25**	4th				Torneio Relâmpago	6th	Sylvio Pirillo	27
1945	Carioca	18	11	3	4	55	26	29	**25**	4th				Torneio Municipal	3rd	Sylvio Pirillo	27
1946	Carioca	24	14	3	7	81	45	36	**31**	3rd				Torneio Relâmpago	4th	José Perácio	27
1946	Carioca	24	14	3	7	81	45	36	**31**	3rd				Torneio Municipal	7th	José Perácio	27
1947	Carioca	20	11	4	5	54	38	16	**26**	5th				Torneio Municipal	3rd	Jair; Sylvio Pirillo	19
1948	Carioca	20	13	2	5	59	36	23	**28**	3rd				Torneio Municipal	3rd	Durval	21
1949	Carioca	20	12	3	5	53	28	25	**27**	3rd						Gringo	12
1950	Carioca	20	7	3	10	50	45	5	**17**	7th				Torneio Rio–São Paulo	5th	Durval	24
1951	Carioca	20	11	3	6	39	21	18	**25**	4th				Torneio Municipal	7th	Hermes	15
1951	Carioca	20	11	3	6	39	21	18	**25**	4th				Torneio Rio–São Paulo	4th	Hermes	15
1952	Carioca	20	14	2	4	59	22	37	**30**	2nd				Torneio Extra	2nd	Adãozinho; Rubens	17
1952	Carioca	20	14	2	4	59	22	37	**30**	2nd				Torneio Rio–São Paulo	10th	Adãozinho; Rubens	17
1953	Carioca	27	21	4	2	77	27	50	**46**	**1st**				Taça dos Campeões Rio–São Paulo	RU	(Paraguay) **Jorge Benítez**	**23**
1953	Carioca	27	21	4	2	77	27	50	**46**	**1st**				Torneio Rio–São Paulo	8th	(Paraguay) **Jorge Benítez**	**23**
1954	Carioca	27	19	6	2	64	27	37	**44**	**1st**				Torneio Rio–São Paulo	7th	Índio	18
1955	Carioca	30	21	2	7	87	41	46	**44**	**1st**				Torneio Rio–São Paulo	5th	**Paulinho**	**25**
1956	Carioca	22	14	3	5	60	25	35	**31**	3rd				Taça dos Campeões Rio–São Paulo	**W**	Índio	17
1957	Carioca	22	14	6	2	60	23	37	**34**	3rd				Torneio Rio–São Paulo	2nd	Henrique Frade	21
1958	Carioca	26	15	6	5	66	29	37	**36**	2nd				Torneio Extra	SF	Dida	22
1958	Carioca	26	15	6	5	66	29	37	**36**	2nd				Torneio Rio–São Paulo	2nd	Dida	22
1959	Carioca	22	11	6	5	48	25	23	**28**	6th				Torneio Rio–São Paulo	3rd	Henrique Frade	19
1959	Série A	–	–	–	–	–	–	–	–	DNQ				Torneio Rio–São Paulo	3rd	Henrique Frade	19
1960	Carioca	22	12	5	5	42	26	16	**29**	4th				Torneio Rio–São Paulo	3rd	Gérson	13
1960	Série A	–	–	–	–	–	–	–	–	DNQ				Torneio Rio–São Paulo	3rd	Gérson	13
1961	Carioca	25	12	6	7	43	29	14	**30**	2nd				Torneio Rio–São Paulo	**1st**	Henrique Frade	19
1961	Série A	–	–	–	–	–	–	–	–	DNQ				Torneio Rio–São Paulo	**1st**	Henrique Frade	19
1962	Carioca	24	18	2	4	57	15	42	**38**	2nd				Torneio Rio–São Paulo	4th	Dida	19
1962	Série A	–	–	–	–	–	–	–	–	DNQ				Torneio Rio–São Paulo	4th	Dida	19
1963	Carioca	24	17	5	2	46	17	29	**39**	**1st**				Torneio Rio–São Paulo	7th	Aírton Beleza	20
1963	Série A	–	–	–	–	–	–	–	–	DNQ				Torneio Rio–São Paulo	7th	Aírton Beleza	20
1964	Carioca	24	15	4	5	45	19	26	**34**	3rd				Torneio Rio–São Paulo	4th	Aírton Beleza	26
1964	Série A	4	2	1	1	6	6	0	**5**	2nd				Torneio Rio–São Paulo	4th	Aírton Beleza	26
1965	Carioca	14	10	2	2	18	8	10	**22**	**1st**				Taça Guanabara	3rd	Fefeu	12
1965	Série A	–	–	–	–	–	–	–	–	DNQ				Torneio Rio–São Paulo	4th	Fefeu	12
1966	Carioca	18	12	5	1	31	12	19	**29**	2nd				Taça Guanabara	2nd	Silva Batuta	22
1966	Série A	–	–	–	–	–	–	–	–	DNQ				Torneio Rio–São Paulo	8th	Silva Batuta	22
1967	Carioca	18	7	3	8	29	30	−1	**17**	5th				Taça Guanabara	5th	**Ademar Pantera**	**21**
1967	Série A	14	3	6	5	23	24	−1	**12**	11th				Taça Guanabara	5th	**Ademar Pantera**	**21**
1968	Carioca	18	11	4	3	35	15	20	**26**	3rd				Taça Guanabara	2nd	Silva Batuta	14
1968	Série A	16	2	7	7	10	21	−11	**11**	15th				Taça Guanabara	2nd	Silva Batuta	14
1969	Carioca	18	11	4	3	27	11	16	**26**	2nd				Taça Guanabara	4th	Dionísio	19
1969	Série A	16	3	6	7	17	30	−13	**12**	16th				Taça Guanabara	4th	Dionísio	19
1970	Carioca	18	9	3	6	26	15	9	**21**	5th				Taça Guanabara	**1st**	Fio Maravilha	17
1970	Série A	16	7	6	3	18	9	9	**20**	6th				Taça Guanabara	**1st**	Fio Maravilha	17
1971	Carioca	20	9	7	4	27	14	13	**25**	4th				Taça Guanabara	2nd	Fio Maravilha	7
1971	Série A	19	4	10	5	13	17	−4	**18**	14th				Taça Guanabara	2nd	Fio Maravilha	7
1972	Carioca	27	17	8	3	43	16	27	**41**	**1st**						(Argentina) **Narciso Doval**	**20**
1972	Série A	28	10	10	8	24	25	−1	**30**	12th						(Argentina) **Narciso Doval**	**20**
1973	Carioca	24	14	5	5	34	16	18	**33**	2nd				Torneio Extra	3rd	**Dadá Maravilha**	**21**
1973	Série A	28	11	4	13	31	34	−3	**26**	24th				Torneio Extra	3rd	**Dadá Maravilha**	**21**
1974	Carioca	27	15	9	3	42	21	21	**39**	**1st**						Zico	31
1974	Série A	24	14	6	4	41	15	26	**34**	6th						Zico	31
1975	Carioca	30	20	5	5	75	24	51	**45**	4th						**Zico**	**40**
1975	Série A	28	13	5	10	34	28	6	**38** (Note: Between 1975 and 1977, each victory by 2 or more goals difference gave the winner an extra point. In 1978 the extra point rule was maintained, but only for wins by 3 goals or more difference.)	7th						**Zico**	**40**
1976	Carioca	29	20	6	3	58	19	39	**46**	5th						Zico	32
1976	Série A	21	14	3	4	48	15	33	**41**	5th						Zico	32
1977	Carioca	28	23	3	2	75	12	63	**49**	2nd						**Zico**	**37**
1977	Série A	19	9	6	4	31	11	20	**31**	9th						**Zico**	**37**
1978	Carioca	22	17	4	1	60	11	49	**38**	**1st**						**Cláudio Adão**	**21** (Note: Zico was tied with teammate Cláudio Adão and Vasco's Roberto Dinamite, as the Campeonato Carioca top scorer, with 19 goals.)
1978	Série A	26	13	7	6	33	26	10	**34**	16th						**Cláudio Adão**	**21**
1979	Carioca	18	13	5	0	51	12	39	**31**	**1st**						**Zico**	**65**
1979	Carioca	33	27	2	4	84	27	57	**58**	**1st**						**Zico**	**65**
1979	Série A	10	7	2	1	21	6	15	**16**	12th						**Zico**	**65**
1980	Carioca	22	13	7	2	44	19	25	**33**	3rd				Taça Guanabara	**1st**	**Zico**	**35**
1980	Série A	22	14	6	2	46	20	26	**34**	**1st**				Taça Guanabara	**1st**	**Zico**	**35**
1981	Carioca	35	23	8	4	83	23	60	**54**	**1st**		Copa Libertadores	**W**			**Nunes**	**45**
1981	Série A	19	9	7	3	30	19	11	**25**	6th		Intercontinental Cup	**W**			**Nunes**	**45**
1982	Carioca	25	15	3	7	53	23	30	**33**	2nd		Copa Libertadores	SF			**Zico**	**44**
1982	Série A	23	15	6	2	48	27	21	**36**	**1st**		Copa Libertadores	SF			**Zico**	**44**
1983	Carioca	24	14	2	8	40	25	15	**30**	2nd		Copa Libertadores	GS			Baltazar	21
1983	Série A	26	14	7	5	57	30	27	**35**	**1st**		Copa Libertadores	GS			Baltazar	21
1984	Carioca	24	15	5	4	38	16	22	**35**	2nd		Copa Libertadores	SF			Tita	21
1984	Série A	22	11	7	4	32	20	12	**29**	5th		Copa Libertadores	SF			Tita	21
1985	Carioca	25	14	8	3	33	14	19	**36**	3rd						Bebeto	19
1985	Série A	26	11	8	7	40	23	17	**30**	9th						Bebeto	19
1986	Carioca	25	15	7	3	45	17	28	**37**	**1st**				Taça dos Campeões Rio–São Paulo	RU	Bebeto	21
1986	Série A	28	12	8	8	34	19	15	**32**	13th				Taça dos Campeões Rio–São Paulo	RU	Bebeto	21
1987	Carioca	31	15	12	4	37	16	21	**42**	2nd						Kita	8
1987	Série A	19	9	6	4	22	15	7	**24**	**1st**						Kita	8
1987	Série A	19	9	6	4	22	15	7	**24**	3rd (Note: The first division of the 1987 edition of the Campeonato Brasileiro were disputed in two modules, Green and Yellow. The Green Module included the country's top clubs (the so-called Clube dos 13) and was widely considered the true Campeonato Brasileiro. The Yellow Module, on the other hand, featured teams that had been left out of the elitist Green Module, and did not have the same visibility as its competitor. Flamengo beat Internacional in the Green Module's decision, while in the Yellow Module, finalists Sport and Guarani, after extra time, drew 11-11 on penalties and agreed to share the title between them. However, at risk of being punished by the CBF for going against the regulations, Guarani gave up the Yellow Module title, as reported by the Diário de Pernambuco newspaper on 22 January 1988. The CBF had planned a cross-over between the finalists of each module to decide the true 1987 Brazilian champion, but Flamengo and Internacional refused, understanding that the championship had already ended with the final of the Green Module. As a result, both were disqualified and Sport and Guarani advanced to a new final, where Sport won and became champion. Sport and Guarani qualificated to the 1988 Copa Libertadores. After decades of court battles, in 2018 the Brazilian Supreme Court decreed that Sport is the true and only 1987 Brazilian champion. Still, CBF, "by way of opinion" also considers Flamengo as champions of that year.)						Kita	8
1988	Carioca	25	15	7	3	41	11	30	**37**	2nd		Supercopa Libertadores	QF			**Bebeto**	**26**
1988	Série A	25	11	8	6	32	20	12	**44** (Note: In the 1988 Brasileirão, all matches that ended in a draw were decided by a penalty shootout; a win in normal time gave 3 points to the winner and zero points to the loser; a win in the penalty shootout gave 2 points to the winner and 1 point to the loser.)	6th		Supercopa Libertadores	QF			**Bebeto**	**26**
1989	Carioca	24	15	6	3	50	16	34	**36**	2nd	SF	Supercopa Libertadores	R1			**Bebeto**	**18**
1989	Série A	18	6	7	5	16	13	3	**19**	9th	SF	Supercopa Libertadores	R1			**Bebeto**	**18**
1990	Carioca	22	11	6	5	40	20	20	**28**	4th	**W**	Supercopa Libertadores	R1			**Gaúcho**	**27**
1990	Série A	19	7	6	6	24	18	6	**20**	11th	**W**	Supercopa Libertadores	R1			**Gaúcho**	**27**
1991	Carioca	25	17	7	1	44	20	24	**41**	**1st**	DNQ (Note: In the early Copa do Brasil editions, only the state champions and runners-up of the previous year qualified. Thus, Flamengo did not qualify to the 1991 (even though they were the cup's current champions) and 1994 editions.)	Copa Libertadores	QF	Copa Rio	**W**	**Gaúcho**	**32**
1991	Série A	19	7	5	7	20	24	−4	**20**	9th	DNQ	Supercopa Libertadores	QF	Supercopa do Brasil	RU	**Gaúcho**	**32**
1992	Carioca	24	15	4	5	49	18	31	**34**	2nd	– (Note: Despite having qualified for the 1992 Copa do Brasil by winning not only the 1991 Campeonato Carioca, but also the first edition of the Copa Rio, a state competition that gave the winner a place in the Copa do Brasil the following year, Flamengo didn't take part in the tournament due to a full calendar.)	Supercopa Libertadores	SF	Copa Rio	GS	Júnior	16
1992	Série A	27	12	8	7	44	31	13	**32**	**1st**	–	Supercopa Libertadores	SF	Copa Rio	GS	Júnior	16
1993	Carioca	22	13	6	3	50	23	27	**32**	3rd	SF	Copa Libertadores	QF	Copa Rio	RU	Nílson; Renato Gaúcho	20
1993	Série A	20	6	8	6	23	24	−1	**20**	8th	SF	Supercopa Libertadores	RU	Torneio Rio–São Paulo	GS	Nílson; Renato Gaúcho	20
1994	Carioca	17	10	4	3	33	20	13	**24**	2nd	DNQ	Supercopa Libertadores	R16	Copa Rio	R2	**Charles Baiano**	**14**
1994	Série A	25	7	9	9	24	27	−3	**23**	14th	DNQ	Supercopa Libertadores	R16	Copa Rio	R2	**Charles Baiano**	**14**
1995	Carioca	29	19	6	4	75	32	43	**66** (Note: Flamengo earned 3 bonus points during the campaign.)	2nd	SF	Supercopa Libertadores	RU	Copa Rio	Wtd (Note: Flamengo withdrew from the competition in the middle of it, alleging scheduling difficulties and that they had already qualified for the 1996 Copa do Brasil as Campeonato Carioca runners-up in 1995, so their matches were canceled.)	Romário	37
1995	Série A	23	5	9	9	23	32	−9	**24**	21st	SF	Supercopa Libertadores	RU	Copa Rio	Wtd	Romário	37
1996	Carioca	22	18	4	0	57	15	42	**58**	**1st**	SF	Copa Ouro	**W**	Taça Cidade Maravilhosa	3rd	**Romário**	**33**
1996	Série A	23	9	3	11	24	31	−7	**30**	13th	SF	Supercopa Libertadores	QF	Taça Cidade Maravilhosa	3rd	**Romário**	**33**
1997	Carioca	23	12	6	5	49	22	27	**42**	3rd	RU	Supercopa Libertadores	GS	Torneio Rio–São Paulo	RU	**Romário**	**35**
1997	Série A	31	14	8	9	37	32	5	**50**	5th	RU	Supercopa Libertadores	GS	Torneio Rio–São Paulo	RU	**Romário**	**35**
1998	Carioca	14	7	4	3	22	14	8	**25**	2nd	R16	Copa Mercosul	GS	Copa Rio	GS	**Romário**	**36**
1998	Série A	23	9	6	8	37	34	3	**33**	11th	R16	Copa Mercosul	GS	Torneio Rio–São Paulo	GS	**Romário**	**36**
1999	Carioca	20	15	2	3	39	13	26	**47**	**1st**	QF	Copa Mercosul	**W**	Torneio Rio–São Paulo	GS	**Romário**	**46**
1999	Série A	21	9	2	10	30	33	−3	**29**	12th	QF	Copa Mercosul	**W**	Seletiva da Libertadores	R1	**Romário**	**46**
2000	Carioca	22	16	3	3	61	25	36	**51**	**1st**	QF	Copa Mercosul	QF	Torneio Rio–São Paulo	GS	(Serbia) Dejan Petković	28
2000	Série A	24	9	6	9	42	37	5	**33**	19th	QF	Copa Mercosul	QF	Copa dos Campeões	SF	(Serbia) Dejan Petković	28
2001	Carioca	18	12	2	4	37	15	22	**38**	**1st**	QF	Copa Mercosul	RU	Torneio Rio–São Paulo	GS	**Edílson**	**28**
2001	Série A	27	8	5	14	25	38	−13	**29**	24th	QF	Copa Mercosul	RU	Copa dos Campeões	**W**	**Edílson**	**28**
2002	Carioca	25	6	7	12	36	46	−10	**25**	8th	– (Note: Between 2001 and 2012, clubs qualifying for the Copa Libertadores, either through the Copa do Brasil or the Campeonato Brasileiro, could not take part in the Copa do Brasil in the same year they took part in the continental competition, as the two competitions had many simultaneous dates.)	Copa Libertadores	GS	Torneio Rio–São Paulo	13th	Liédson	15
2002	Série A	25	8	6	11	38	39	−1	**30**	18th	–	Copa Libertadores	GS	Copa dos Campeões	SF	Liédson	15
2003	Carioca	13	7	2	4	22	20	2	**23**	3rd	RU	Copa Sul-Americana	R1			Edílson; Fernando Baiano	16
2003	Série A	46	18	12	16	66	73	−7	**66**	8th	RU	Copa Sul-Americana	R1			Edílson; Fernando Baiano	16
2004	Carioca	15	8	3	4	29	19	10	**27**	**1st**	RU	Copa Sul-Americana	R1			Jean	15
2004	Série A	46	13	15	18	51	53	−2	**54**	17th	RU	Copa Sul-Americana	R1			Jean	15
2005	Carioca	13	4	4	5	17	20	−3	**16**	8th	R16					Renato Abreu	14
2005	Série A	42	14	13	15	56	60	−4	**55**	15th	R16					Renato Abreu	14
2006	Carioca	11	2	5	4	20	21	−1	**11**	11th	**W**					Renato Abreu	19
2006	Série A	38	15	7	16	44	48	−4	**52**	11th	**W**					Renato Abreu	19
2007	Carioca	16	7	4	5	28	25	3	**21**	**1st**	–	Copa Libertadores	R16			Souza	15
2007	Série A	38	17	10	11	55	19	6	**61**	3rd	–	Copa Libertadores	R16			Souza	15
2008	Carioca	20	15	2	3	46	22	24	**47**	**1st**	–	Copa Libertadores	R16			Marcinho	17
2008	Série A	38	18	10	10	67	48	19	**64**	5th	–	Copa Libertadores	R16			Marcinho	17
2009	Carioca	20	12	6	2	38	22	16	**42**	**1st**	QF	Copa Sul-Americana	R1			**Adriano**	**19**
2009	Série A	38	19	10	9	58	44	14	**67**	**1st**	QF	Copa Sul-Americana	R1			**Adriano**	**19**
2010	Carioca	18	14	2	2	46	23	23	**42**	2nd	–	Copa Libertadores	QF			**Vágner Love**	**23**
2010	Série A	38	9	17	12	41	44	−3	**44**	14th	–	Copa Libertadores	QF			**Vágner Love**	**23**
2011	Carioca	19	12	7	0	30	13	17	**43**	**1st**	QF	Copa Sul-Americana	R16			Deivid; Ronaldinho; Thiago Neves	21
2011	Série A	38	15	16	7	59	47	12	**61**	4th	QF	Copa Sul-Americana	R16			Deivid; Ronaldinho; Thiago Neves	21
2012	Carioca	17	11	3	3	30	14	16	**36**	3rd	–	Copa Libertadores	GS			Vágner Love	24
2012	Série A	38	12	14	12	39	46	−7	**50**	11th	–	Copa Libertadores	GS			Vágner Love	24
2013	Carioca	16	10	3	3	28	14	14	**33**	2nd	**W**					**Hernane**	**36**
2013	Série A	38	12	13	13	43	46	−3	**45** (Note: Flamengo was punished by the STJD with the loss of four points due to the irregular fielding of the player André Santos in the match against Cruzeiro, in the last round of the championship.)	16th	**W**					**Hernane**	**36**
2014	Carioca	19	14	4	1	44	19	25	**46**	**1st**	SF	Copa Libertadores	GS			Alecsandro	21
2014	Série A	38	14	10	14	46	47	−1	**52**	10th	SF	Copa Libertadores	GS			Alecsandro	21
2015	Carioca	17	11	4	2	31	10	21	**37**	3rd	R16					Alecsandro; Marcelo Cirino	11
2015	Série A	38	15	4	19	45	53	−8	**49**	12th	R16					Alecsandro; Marcelo Cirino	11
2016	Carioca	16	9	4	3	29	10	19	**31**	3rd	R2	Copa Sul-Americana	R16	Primeira Liga	SF	(Peru) Paolo Guerrero	18
2016	Série A	38	20	11	7	52	35	17	**71**	3rd	R2	Copa Sul-Americana	R16	Primeira Liga	SF	(Peru) Paolo Guerrero	18
2017	Carioca	17	12	5	0	39	12	27	**41**	**1st**	RU	Copa Libertadores	GS	Primeira Liga	QF	(Peru) **Paolo Guerrero**	**20**
2017	Série A	38	15	11	12	49	38	11	**56**	6th	RU	Copa Sul-Americana	RU	Primeira Liga	QF	(Peru) **Paolo Guerrero**	**20**
2018	Carioca	15	10	2	3	23	8	15	**32**	3rd	SF	Copa Libertadores	R16			Henrique Dourado; Lucas Paquetá	12
2018	Série A	38	21	9	8	59	29	30	**72**	2nd	SF	Copa Libertadores	R16			Henrique Dourado; Lucas Paquetá	12
2019	Carioca	17	11	5	1	33	13	20	**38**	**1st**	QF	Copa Libertadores	**W**			**Gabriel Barbosa**	**43** (Note: Bruno Henrique was the Campeonato Carioca top scorer, with 8 goals.)
2019	Série A	38	28	6	4	86	37	49	**90**	**1st**	QF	FIFA Club World Cup	RU			**Gabriel Barbosa**	**43**
2020	Carioca	17	14	2	1	34	11	23	**44**	**1st**	QF	Copa Libertadores	R16	Supercopa do Brasil	**W**	**Gabriel Barbosa**	**26**
2020	Série A	38	21	8	9	68	48	20	**71**	**1st**	QF	Recopa Sul-Americana	**W**	Supercopa do Brasil	**W**	**Gabriel Barbosa**	**26**
2021	Carioca	15	10	3	2	34	13	21	**33**	**1st**	SF	Copa Libertadores	RU	Supercopa do Brasil	**W**	Gabriel Barbosa	34
2021	Série A	38	21	8	9	69	36	33	**71**	2nd	SF	Copa Libertadores	RU	Supercopa do Brasil	**W**	Gabriel Barbosa	34
2022	Carioca	15	10	3	2	30	11	19	**33**	2nd	**W**	Copa Libertadores	**W**	Supercopa do Brasil	RU	**Gabriel Barbosa**; Pedro	**29** (Note: Gabriel was the Campeonato Carioca top scorer, with 9 goals.)
2022	Série A	38	18	8	12	60	39	21	**62**	5th	**W**	Copa Libertadores	**W**	Supercopa do Brasil	RU	**Gabriel Barbosa**; Pedro	**29**
2023	Carioca	15	10	2	3	28	12	16	**32**	2nd	RU	Copa Libertadores	R16	Supercopa do Brasil	RU	Pedro	35
2023	Série A	38	19	9	10	56	42	14	**66**	4th	RU	FIFA Club World Cup	3rd	Supercopa do Brasil	RU	Pedro	35
2023	Série A	38	19	9	10	56	42	14	**66**	4th	RU	Recopa Sul-Americana	RU	Supercopa do Brasil	RU	Pedro	35
2024	Carioca	15	11	4	0	29	1	28	**37**	**1st**	**W**	Copa Libertadores	QF			**Pedro**	**30**
2024	Série A	38	20	10	8	61	42	19	**70**	3rd	**W**	Copa Libertadores	QF			**Pedro**	**30**
2025	Carioca	15	10	3	2	30	7	23	**33**	**1st**	R16	Copa Libertadores	**W**	Supercopa do Brasil	**W**	(Uruguay) Giorgian de Arrascaeta	25
2025	Série A	38	23	10	5	78	27	51	**79**	**1st**	R16	FIFA Club World Cup	R16	Supercopa do Brasil	**W**	(Uruguay) Giorgian de Arrascaeta	25
2025	Série A	38	23	10	5	78	27	51	**79**	**1st**	R16	FIFA Intercontinental Cup	RU	Supercopa do Brasil	**W**	(Uruguay) Giorgian de Arrascaeta	25
2026	Carioca	10	5	2	3	24	10	14	**16**	**1st**	R5	Copa Libertadores	SF	Supercopa do Brasil	RU	**Pedro**	**29**
2026	Série A	36	24	8	4	74	31	43	**80**	**1st**	R5	Recopa Sudamericana	RU	Supercopa do Brasil	RU	**Pedro**	**29**
