= List of CR Vasco da Gama seasons =

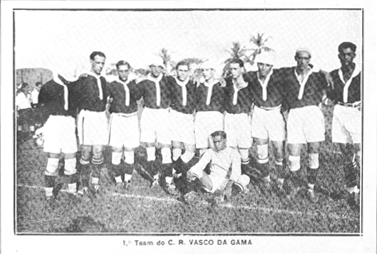
The Vasco da Gama football team in its early years.

Club de Regatas Vasco da Gama is a Brazilian professional football club based in Rio de Janeiro. Founded on 21 August 1898 as a rowing club by Portuguese immigrants, the institution expanded its sporting departments and officially began competing in football in 1915. Vasco became one of Brazil's most influential clubs, particularly noted for its historic stance against racial and social discrimination during the 1920s, when the club challenged exclusionary practices in Rio de Janeiro football. The club plays its home matches at São Januário, inaugurated in 1927, which remains one of Brazil's most traditional football stadiums. Vasco won the Campeonato Carioca for the first time in 1923 with the legendary Camisas Negras squad. Since then, the club has secured numerous state titles and emerged as a major national power. Vasco claimed the Campeonato Brasileiro Série A four times (1974, 1989, 1997, and 2000), won the Copa do Brasil in 2011, and earned several national and regional honours. Internationally, the club achieved the first continental tournament in football history, the South American Championship of Champions in 1948 (its 50th anniversary), the Copa Libertadores in 1998 (its 100th anniversary), and later captured the Copa Mercosur in 2000 in a dramatic final.

At the end of the 2025 season, the team completed 50 seasons in the first division of the Brazilian football league system and five in the second. The table details the team's achievements from its debut in the third division of the Campeonato Carioca in the 1916 season until the end of the most recent season.

== Key ==
Comp.	Competition	C	Champion
Div.	Division	RU	Runner-up
Pos.	Final position	SF	Semifinalist
Pld	Played	QF	Quarterfinalist
Pts	Points	R16	Round of 16
W	Win	R32	Round of 32
D	Draw	GS	Group stage
L	Loss	4P	Fourth phase
GF	Goals for	3P	Third phase
GA	Goals against	2P	Second phase
GD	Goals difference	1P	First phase

== Seasons ==
Season	League											Copa do Brasil	International		Other competitions	
Season	Comp.	Div.	Pos.	Pld	Pts	W	D	L	GF	GA	GD	Copa do Brasil	International		Other competitions	
1916	Carioca	3rd	6th	–	–	–	–	–	–	–	–	—	—		—	
1917	Carioca	2nd	–	–	–	–	–	–	–	–	–	—	—		—	
1918	Carioca	2nd	–	–	–	–	–	–	–	–	–	—	—		—	
1919	Carioca	2nd	–	–	–	–	–	–	–	–	–	—	—		—	
1920	Carioca	2nd	–	–	–	–	–	–	–	–	–	—	—		—	
1921	Carioca	2nd	3rd	12	15	6	3	3	27	17	+10	—	—		—	
1922	Carioca	2nd	C	12	21	10	1	1	36	10	+26	—	—		—	
1923	Carioca	1st	C	14	25	12	1	1	32	19	+13	—	—		—	
1924	Carioca	1st	C	14	28	14	0	0	40	9	+31	—	—		—	
1925	Carioca	1st	3rd	18	29	13	3	2	57	25	+32	—	—		—	
1926	Carioca	1st	RU	18	29	14	1	3	66	30	+36	—	—		—	
1927	Carioca	1st	4th	18	24	10	4	4	53	29	+24	—	—		—	
1928	Carioca	1st	RU	19	28	12	4	3	43	17	+26	—	—		—	
1929	Carioca	1st	C	23	38	15	7	1	60	24	+36	—	—		Taça dos Campeões Estaduais	RU
1930	Carioca	1st	RU	20	32	14	3	3	42	16	+30	—	—		—	
1931	Carioca	1st	RU	20	29	13	3	4	45	24	+21	—	—		—	
1932	Carioca	1st	6th	22	23	9	5	8	52	43	+9	—	—		—	
1933	Carioca	1st	3rd	10	10	4	2	4	18	13	+5	—	—		Torneio Rio–São Paulo	5th
1934	Carioca	1st	C	12	18	8	2	2	28	16	+12	—	—		Taça dos Campeões Estaduais	RU
1935	Carioca	1st	RU	22	34	15	4	3	69	22	+47	—	—		—	
1936	Carioca	1st	C	16	23	11	1	4	33	19	+14	—	—		Taça dos Campeões Estaduais	C
1937	Carioca	1st	3rd	22	30	13	4	5	84	42	+42	—	—		—	
1938	Carioca	1st	4th	16	19	7	5	4	37	27	+10	—	—		—	
1939	Carioca	1st	6th	24	23	8	7	9	32	34	–2	—	—		—	
1940	Carioca	1st	3rd	24	36	17	2	5	67	31	+36	—	—		—	
1941	Carioca	1st	4th	28	37	15	7	6	69	39	+30	—	—		—	
1942	Carioca	1st	7th	27	22	8	6	13	44	52	–8	—	—		—	
1943	Carioca	1st	4th	18	24	11	2	5	64	38	+26	—	—		—	
1944	Carioca	1st	RU	18	26	12	2	4	53	27	+26	—	—		—	
1945	Carioca	1st	C	18	31	13	5	0	58	15	+43	—	—		Taça dos Campeões Estaduais	RU
1946	Carioca	1st	5th	18	22	8	6	4	42	33	+9	—	—		—	
1947	Carioca	1st	C	20	37	17	3	0	68	20	+48	—	—		Taça dos Campeões Estaduais	RU
1948	Carioca	1st	RU	20	34	17	0	3	62	26	+36	—	South American Championship	C	—	
1949	Carioca	1st	C	20	38	18	2	0	84	24	+60	—	—		—	
1950	Carioca	1st	C	20	34	17	0	3	74	21	+53	—	—		Torneio Rio–São Paulo	RU
1951	Carioca	1st	5th	20	22	9	4	7	36	29	+7	—	—		Torneio Rio–São Paulo	7th
1952	Carioca	1st	C	20	36	17	2	1	49	18	+31	—	—		Torneio Rio–São Paulo	RU
1953	Carioca	1st	4th	27	34	12	10	5	68	40	+28	—	—		Torneio Rio–São Paulo	RU
1954	Carioca	1st	3rd	27	36	15	6	6	64	36	+28	—	—		Torneio Rio–São Paulo	5th
1955	Carioca	1st	4th	27	42	19	4	4	62	26	+36	—	—		Torneio Rio–São Paulo	8th
1956	Carioca	1st	C	22	36	16	4	2	58	17	+41	—	—		Taça dos Campeões Estaduais	RU
1957	Carioca	1st	4th	22	33	15	3	4	51	28	+23	—	Tournoi de Paris (Note: The inaugural edition of the Tournoi de Paris featured a clash between the only two continental champions of the time in front of more than 65,000 spectators; consequently, it is not viewed as a friendly tournament.)	C	Torneio Rio–São Paulo	RU
1958	Carioca	1st	C	26	37	16	5	5	56	31	+25	—	—		Torneio Rio–São Paulo	C
1959	Carioca	1st	4th	22	31	14	3	5	60	30	+30	—	—		Torneio Rio–São Paulo	RU
1959	Brasileiro	1st	SF	3	2	1	0	2	2	3	–1	—	—		Torneio Rio–São Paulo	RU
1960	Carioca	1st	5th	22	28	12	4	6	36	19	+17	—	—		Torneio Rio–São Paulo	3rd
1961	Carioca	1st	3rd	25	30	12	6	7	34	26	+8	—	—		Torneio Rio–São Paulo	3rd
1962	Carioca	1st	4th	24	35	15	5	4	51	19	+32	—	—		Torneio Rio–São Paulo	7th
1963	Carioca	1st	6th	24	29	11	7	6	39	23	+16	—	—		Torneio Rio–São Paulo	9th
1964	Carioca	1st	6th	24	29	11	7	6	44	28	+16	—	—		Torneio Rio–São Paulo	8th
1965	Carioca	1st	5th	14	15	7	1	6	24	17	+7	—	—		Torneio Rio–São Paulo	RU
1965	Brasileiro	1st	RU	4	3	1	1	2	4	8	–4	—	—		Torneio Rio–São Paulo	RU
1966	Carioca	1st	5th	18	19	8	3	7	23	22	+1	—	—		Torneio Rio–São Paulo	C
1967	Carioca	1st	5th	18	16	6	4	8	27	22	+5	—	—		—	
1967	Brasileiro	1st	12th	14	12	3	6	5	10	21	–11	—	—		—	
1968	Carioca	1st	RU	18	22	13	3	2	29	15	+14	—	—		—	
1968	Brasileiro	1st	3rd	19	22	10	2	7	31	29	+2	—	—		—	
1969	Carioca	1st	3rd	18	29	8	6	4	30	13	+17	—	—		—	
1969	Brasileiro	1st	17th	16	8	2	4	10	13	23	–10	—	—		—	
1970	Carioca	1st	C	18	29	13	3	2	30	14	+16	—	—		—	
1970	Brasileiro	1st	17th	16	7	2	3	11	14	26	–12	—	—		—	
1971	Carioca	1st	7th	20	15	5	5	10	16	27	–11	—	—		—	
1971	Brasileiro	1st	12th	25	23	7	7	9	15	22	–7	—	—		—	
1972	Carioca	1st	3rd	27	35	12	11	4	20	14	+6	—	—		—	
1972	Brasileiro	1st	7th	28	34	11	12	5	28	18	+10	—	—		—	
1973	Carioca	1st	3rd	23	38	16	6	1	35	9	+26	—	—		—	
1973	Brasileiro	1st	14th	37	40	13	14	10	37	28	+9	—	—		—	
1974	Carioca	1st	RU	27	26	16	6	5	43	28	+15	—	—		—	
1974	Brasileiro	1st	C	28	36	14	10	4	35	17	+18	—	—		—	
1975	Carioca	1st	3rd	32	46	22	4	6	65	28	+37	—	Copa Libertadores	GS	—	
1975	Brasileiro	1st	19th	21	24	7	7	7	25	23	+2	—	Copa Libertadores	GS	—	
1976	Carioca	1st	RU	33	39	18	8	7	51	33	+18	—	—		—	
1976	Brasileiro	1st	12th	20	27	11	2	7	27	28	–1	—	—		—	
1977	Carioca	1st	C	28	52	25	2	1	69	5	+64	—	—		—	
1977	Brasileiro	1st	12th	18	29	8	8	2	26	10	+16	—	—		—	
1978	Carioca	1st	RU	22	35	15	5	2	52	15	+37	—	—		—	
1978	Brasileiro	1st	4th	30	50	17	10	3	61	22	+39	—	—		—	
1979	Carioca	1st	RU	51	75 (Note: All numbers added together with the other stages of the championship.)	33	9	9	112	38	+74	—	—		—	
1979	Brasileiro	1st	RU	14	20	8	4	2	27	8	+19	—	—		—	
1980	Carioca	1st	RU	23	36	16	4	3	40	17	+23	—	Copa Libertadores	GS	—	
1980	Brasileiro	1st	8th	18	25	10	5	3	31	14	+17	—	Copa Libertadores	GS	—	
1981	Carioca	1st	RU	35	53	23	7	5	69	30	+39	—	—		—	
1981	Brasileiro	1st	5th	19	27	11	5	3	41	17	+24	—	—		—	
1982	Carioca	1st	C	24	38	17	4	3	42	21	+21	—	—		—	
1982	Brasileiro	1st	10th	16	22	10	2	4	42	14	+28	—	—		—	
1983	Carioca	1st	7th	22	20	6	8	8	23	24	–1	—	—		—	
1983	Brasileiro	1st	6th	22	26	7	12	3	29	17	+12	—	—		—	
1984	Carioca	1st	3rd	24	29	12	5	7	31	20	+11	—	—		—	
1984	Brasileiro	1st	RU	26	33	14	5	7	51	20	+31	—	—		—	
1985	Carioca	1st	4th	22	29	11	7	4	38	15	+23	—	Copa Libertadores	GS	—	
1985	Brasileiro	1st	10th	26	30	11	8	7	37	31	+6	—	Copa Libertadores	GS	—	
1986	Carioca	1st	RU	25	33	14	5	6	50	22	+28	—	—		—	
1986	Brasileiro	1st	16th	28	28	10	8	10	35	24	+11	—	—		—	
1987	Carioca	1st	C	31	47	19	9	3	61	15	+46	—	—		—	
1987	Brasileiro	1st	10th	15	13	5	3	7	17	18	–1	—	—		—	
1988	Carioca	1st	C	27	45	21	3	3	47	16	+31	—	—		—	
1988	Brasileiro	1st	5th	25	57	13	8	4	36	18	+18	—	—		—	
1989	Carioca	1st	3rd	22	32	13	6	3	35	18	+17	R16	—		—	
1989	Brasileiro	1st	C	19	26	9	8	2	27	16	+11	R16	—		—	
1990	Carioca	1st	RU	24	33	13	7	4	44	17	+27	—	Copa Libertadores	QF	—	
1990	Brasileiro	1st	12th	19	18	3	12	4	15	15	0	—	Copa Libertadores	QF	—	
1991	Carioca	1st	4th	22	31	13	5	4	43	17	+26	R16	—		—	
1991	Brasileiro	1st	11th	19	19	4	11	4	22	26	–4	R16	—		—	
1992	Carioca	1st	C	24	42	18	6	0	44	10	+34	R16	—		—	
1992	Brasileiro	1st	3rd	25	32	11	10	4	41	23	+18	R16	—		—	
1993	Carioca	1st	C	25	37	16	5	4	47	19	+28	SF	—		Torneio Rio–São Paulo	GS
1993	Brasileiro	1st	17th	14	13	5	3	6	19	20	–1	SF	—		Torneio Rio–São Paulo	GS
1994	Carioca	1st	C	18	29	12	5	1	28	9	+19	SF	—		—	
1994	Brasileiro	1st	13th	25	24	8	8	9	23	25	–2	SF	—		—	
1995	Carioca	1st	4th	28	38	14	10	4	50	23	+27	SF	—		—	
1995	Brasileiro	1st	20th	23	24	7	3	13	32	39	–7	SF	—		—	
1996	Carioca	1st	RU	22	51	16	3	3	42	15	+27	R16	—		—	
1996	Brasileiro	1st	18th	23	27	8	3	12	37	43	–6	R16	—		—	
1997	Carioca	1st	RU	26	49	15	4	7	37	22	+15	R16	Supercopa Libertadores	GS	Torneio Rio–São Paulo	QF
1997	Brasileiro	1st	C	33	54	21	7	5	69	37	+32	R16	Supercopa Libertadores	GS	Torneio Rio–São Paulo	QF
1998	Carioca	1st	C	14	34	11	1	2	25	8	+17	SF	Copa Libertadores	C	Torneio Rio–São Paulo	GS
1998	Carioca	1st	C	14	34	11	1	2	25	8	+17	SF	Copa Interamericana	RU	Torneio Rio–São Paulo	GS
1998	Brasileiro	1st	10th	23	34	9	7	7	34	24	+10	SF	Intercontinental Cup	RU	Torneio Rio–São Paulo	GS
1998	Brasileiro	1st	10th	23	34	9	7	7	34	24	+10	SF	Copa Mercosur	GS	Torneio Rio–São Paulo	GS
1999	Carioca	1st	RU	20	46	14	4	2	45	14	+31	R16	Copa Libertadores	R16	Torneio Rio–São Paulo	C
1999	Brasileiro	1st	6th	24	38	10	8	6	40	31	+9	R16	Copa Mercosur	GS	Torneio Rio–São Paulo	C
2000	Carioca	1st	RU	22	48	15	3	4	57	20	+37	R16	FIFA Club World Championship	RU	Torneio Rio–São Paulo	RU
2000	Brasileiro	1st	C	32	54	15	9	8	54	49	+5	R16	Copa Mercosur	C	Torneio Rio–São Paulo	RU
2001	Carioca	1st	RU	19	42	13	3	3	42	18	+24	—	Copa Libertadores	QF	Torneio Rio–São Paulo	GS
2001	Brasileiro	1st	11th	27	39	10	9	8	57	36	+21	—	Copa Mercosur	GS	Torneio Rio–São Paulo	GS
2002	Carioca	1st	7th	25	49	15	4	6	50	30	+20	QF	—		Torneio Rio–São Paulo	6th
2002	Brasileiro	1st	15th	25	33	10	3	12	37	38	–1	QF	—		Torneio Rio–São Paulo	6th
2003	Carioca	1st	C	15	34	10	4	1	33	14	+19	QF	Copa Sudamericana	1P	—	
2003	Brasileiro	1st	17th	46	54	13	15	18	57	69	–12	QF	Copa Sudamericana	1P	—	
2004	Carioca	1st	RU	16	30	9	3	4	29	17	+12	2P	—		—	
2004	Brasileiro	1st	16th	46	54	14	12	20	64	68	–4	2P	—		—	
2005	Carioca	1st	5th	12	20	5	5	2	22	16	+6	R16	—		—	
2005	Brasileiro	1st	12th	42	56	15	11	16	74	84	–10	R16	—		—	
2006	Carioca	1st	9th	11	16	4	4	3	22	21	+1	RU	Copa Sudamericana	2P	—	
2006	Brasileiro	1st	6th	38	57	15	12	11	52	44	+8	RU	Copa Sudamericana	2P	—	
2007	Carioca	1st	4th	13	22	6	4	3	36	20	+16	2P	Copa Sudamericana	QF	—	
2007	Brasileiro	1st	10th	38	54	15	9	14	58	47	+11	2P	Copa Sudamericana	QF	—	
2008	Carioca	1st	4th	17	32	10	2	5	41	18	+23	SF	Copa Sudamericana	1P	—	
2008	Brasileiro	1st	18th	38	40	11	7	20	56	72	–16	SF	Copa Sudamericana	1P	—	
2009	Carioca	1st	3rd	16	38	12	2	2	35	13	+22	SF	—		—	
2009	Brasileiro	2nd	C	38	76	22	10	6	58	29	+29	SF	—		—	
2010	Carioca	1st	4th	18	35	11	2	5	34	16	+18	QF	—		—	
2010	Brasileiro	1st	11th	38	49	11	16	11	43	45	–2	QF	—		—	
2011	Carioca	1st	6th	17	28	8	4	5	36	19	+17	C	Copa Sudamericana	SF	—	
2011	Brasileiro	1st	RU	38	69	19	12	7	57	40	+17	C	Copa Sudamericana	SF	—	
2012	Carioca	1st	4th	19	41	13	2	4	39	21	+18	—	Copa Libertadores	QF	—	
2012	Brasileiro	1st	5th	38	58	16	10	12	45	44	+1	—	Copa Libertadores	QF	—	
2013	Carioca	1st	4th	17	26	8	2	7	26	23	+3	QF	—		—	
2013	Brasileiro	1st	18th	38	44	11	11	16	50	61	–11	QF	—		—	
2014	Carioca	1st	RU	19	35	9	8	2	35	14	+21	R16	—		—	
2014	Brasileiro	2nd	3rd	38	63	16	15	7	50	36	+14	R16	—		—	
2015	Carioca	1st	C	19	43	13	4	2	35	14	+21	QF	—		—	
2015	Brasileiro	1st	18th	38	41	10	11	17	28	54	–26	QF	—		—	
2016	Carioca	1st	C	18	44	13	5	0	30	9	+21	R16	—		—	
2016	Brasileiro	2nd	3rd	38	65	19	8	11	54	41	+13	R16	—		—	
2017	Carioca	1st	3rd	15	25	7	4	4	16	14	+2	3P	—		—	
2017	Brasileiro	1st	7th	38	56	15	11	12	40	47	–7	3P	—		—	
2018	Carioca	1st	RU	15	26	8	2	5	28	23	+5	R16	Copa Libertadores	GS	—	
2018	Brasileiro	1st	16th	38	43	10	13	15	41	48	–7	R16	Copa Sudamericana	2P	—	
2019	Carioca	1st	RU	15	29	9	2	4	20	12	+8	4P	—		—	
2019	Brasileiro	1st	12th	38	49	12	13	13	39	45	+6	4P	—		—	
2020	Carioca	1st	7th	11	15	4	3	4	9	9	0	4P	Copa Sudamericana	R16	—	
2020	Brasileiro	1st	17th	38	41	10	11	17	37	56	–19	4P	Copa Sudamericana	R16	—	
2021	Carioca	1st	5th	15	23	6	5	4	24	18	+6	R16	—		—	
2021	Brasileiro	2nd	10th	38	49	13	10	15	43	52	–9	R16	—		—	
2022	Carioca	1st	3rd	13	22	7	1	5	19	13	+6	2P	—		—	
2022	Brasileiro	2nd	4th	38	62	17	11	10	48	36	+12	2P	—		—	
2023	Carioca	1st	3rd	13	23	7	2	4	23	12	+11	2P	—		—	
2023	Brasileiro	1st	15th	38	45	12	9	17	41	51	–10	2P	—		—	
2024	Carioca	1st	3rd	13	23	6	5	2	21	12	+9	SF	—		—	
2024	Brasileiro	1st	10th	38	50	14	8	16	43	56	–13	SF	—		—	
2025	Carioca	1st	4th	13	17	4	5	4	14	12	+2	RU	Copa Sudamericana	R16p	—	
2025	Brasileiro	1st	14th	38	45	13	6	19	55	60	–5	RU	Copa Sudamericana	R16p	—	
