= Abel Picabea =

Argentine footballer and manager

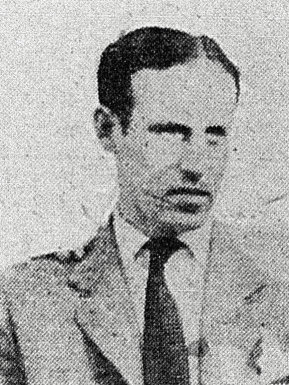

Personal information
- Full name: Abel Picabea Allero
- Date of birth: 20 June 1906
- Place of birth: Buenos Aires, Argentina
- Date of death: June 20, 1993
- Place of death: Rio de Janeiro
- Position: Midfielder

Senior career*
Years	Team	Apps	(Gls)
1925	San Lorenzo		
1926–1927	Estudiantil Porteño		
1928	Almagro		
1931	Barracas Central		
1932	Rosario Central	12	(1)
1937–1941	São Cristóvão		

Managerial career
- 1941: Canto do Rio
- 1942–1944: São Cristóvão
- 1945–1946: Madureira
- 1946–1947: Santos
- 1948: Portuguesa Santista
- 1949–1950: América Mineiro
- 1951: Olaria
- 1952: Palmeiras
- 1953: Ferroviária
- 1954: Portuguesa
- 1956–1957: Sporting CP
- 1957–1959: Oviedo
- 1959–1960: Sporting Gijón
- 1960–1961: Vasco da Gama
- * Club domestic league appearances and goals

Abel Picabea Allero (20 June 1906 – 1993) was an Argentine football manager and player. He played as a midfielder.

== Career ==
Born in Buenos Aires, Picabea started his career with San Lorenzo before representing Estudiantil Porteño and Rosario Central in his homeland. In 1937, he moved to Brazil and joined São Cristóvão, where he retired in 1941.

Immediately after retiring Picabea took up coaching, with his first managerial club being Canto do Rio. He subsequently returned to São Cristóvão and won the Taça da Prefeitura do Distrito Federal in 1943.

In 1946, after being in charge of Madureira, Picabea was appointed manager of Santos, becoming the club's first Argentine manager; he is also the foreign manager who managed the club for the most times. He subsequently worked at Portuguesa Santista, América Mineiro, Olaria, Palmeiras, Ferroviária and Portuguesa, winning the Fita Azul with the latter.

Picabea arrived at Sporting CP in the later stages of the 1955–56 season, he was in charge of the club during the whole 1956–57 campaign before taking over Real Oviedo in the Spanish Segunda División. After winning the second division with the club, he was later in charge of neighbouring Sporting de Gijón before returning to Brazil in 1960 with Vasco da Gama.

== Honours ==
=== Manager ===
São Cristóvão

- Taça da Prefeitura do Distrito Federal: 1943

Oviedo

- Segunda División: 1957–58
