= Ricardo Riemer =

Brazilian footballer (1884–1965)

Personal information
- Full name: Ricardo Guimarães Riemer
- Date of birth: 7 June 1884
- Place of birth: Rio de Janeiro, Empire of Brazil
- Date of death: 12 August 1965 (aged 81)
- Place of death: Rio de Janeiro, Brazil
- Positions: Forward; midfielder

Youth career
- 1913: Flamengo

Senior career*
| Years | Team | Apps | (Gls) |
| 1910 | Haddock Lobo | | |
| 1911 | Mangueira | | |
| 1911 | Fluminense | | |
| 1912 | America | | |
| 1913–1918 | Flamengo | 69 | (50) |
- * Club domestic league appearances and goals

Ricardo Guimarães Riemer (Rio de Janeiro, 7 June 1884 – Rio de Janeiro, 12 August 1965) was a Brazilian footballer. He stood out in the early days of football in Rio de Janeiro, particularly with Clube de Regatas do Flamengo, where he was one of the leading players of the 1910s. He was the first player in the club’s history to hit the 50-goal mark and ended his career with the ‘rubro-negros’ with 56 goals in 69 games. Alongside his sporting career, he built a career as a doctor and military officer, rising to the rank of major-doctor in the Brazilian Army during World War II.

== Early life ==
Ricardo Guimarães Riemer was born in the city of Rio de Janeiro on 7 June 1884. Whilst still a student, he began his sporting career playing for the Colégio Paula Freitas football team.

He later enrolled at the National School of Medicine, balancing his studies with his sporting career. Even whilst playing, he continued his medical studies, graduating with a degree in Medicine in 1919.

== Football career ==
=== First years ===
Riemer began his amateur football career with Haddock Lobo Football Club in 1910. The following year, he played for Sport Club Mangueira, a team that secured promotion to the Campeonato Carioca first division. He also played for Fluminense Football Club in 1911.

As a member of the group of players led by Alberto Borgerth who left Fluminense following internal disagreements, he helped establish Flamengo’s Land Sports Department. Initially, however, he chose to play for America Football Club in 1912.

In July of that year, he was registered by Clube de Regatas do Flamengo to compete in the 1913 Campeonato Carioca.

=== Flamengo ===
Riemer’s arrival at Flamengo was seen as a significant boost to the team made up of former Fluminense players who had moved to the club in 1912. In less than two years, he became one of the key players in the squad that won the 1914 Campeonato Carioca, the first football title in Flamengo’s history, with him scoring the decisive goal in the 2–1 win over Fluminense in 15 November, the club's 19th anniversary.

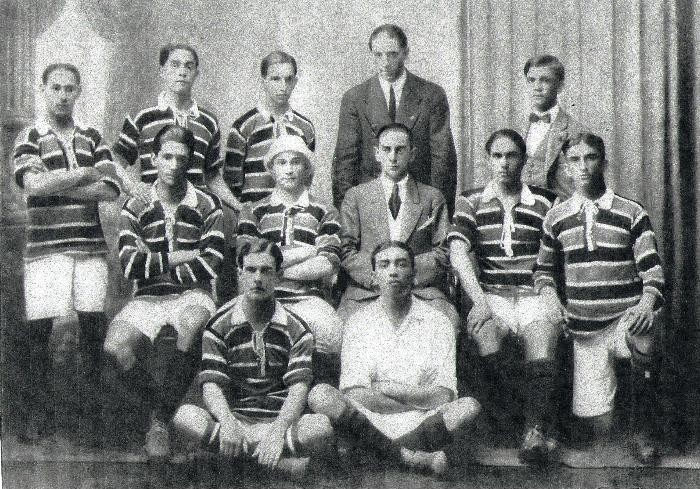
The Flamengo team in 1914. Riemer is the one sitting in the front on the left, right of all-white goalkeeper Baena.

Although he played predominantly as a defensive midfielder, he stood out for his attacking ability and his powerful long-range shot. His distinctive shooting style earned him the nickname “Perna-de-Pau” (wood-leg).

In the 1914 season, he finished as the Flamengo’s top scorer with eight goals, only behind Fluminense's Barthô (10) and Henry Welfare (9). He was also Flamengo’s top scorer in the 1914 and 1915 seasons.

Between 1913 and 1918, he played 69 matches for the club and scored 56 goals, averaging 0.81 goals per game. He became the first player in Flamengo’s history to surpass the 50-goal mark and ended the 1910s as the club’s top goalscorer of that period.

Riemer also excelled in derbies against Fluminense, scoring 13 goals in Fla-Flus. His average of 1.08 goals per match in these fixtures is cited by researchers of the club’s history as the highest ever recorded by a Flamengo player in the derby.

From 1918 onwards, he took part only in Flamengo’s internal competitions.

== Medical career ==
Whilst playing football, Riemer studied medicine at the National School of Medicine, graduating in 1919. After retiring from sport, he devoted himself entirely to his medical career.

He began his career as an assistant inspector at the Maritime Health Hospital. He later became director of the Men’s Medical Clinic at the Souza Aguiar Municipal Hospital, a position he held until his mandatory retirement in 1964.

In 1943, during World War II, he was appointed major-doctor in the Brazilian Army.

== Personal life ==
Riemer married Raquel Castro Riemer, an opera singer and pianist, in 1920. The couple had several children, including Rosina Riemer.

Even after retiring from competitive football, he maintained a strong connection with Flamengo and continued to attend the club’s games and events for much of his life. In interviews given in his later years, he argued that Flamengo’s rise to national prominence was linked to the contributions of several former players from the 1914 championship team who, after earning their medical degrees, went on to practice medicine in different regions of Brazil.

In the final decades of his life, he also devoted himself to raising birds and preserving photographs and mementos from his football career.

== Death ==
In August 1965, a few days before his death, he received a Flamengo shirt from his daughter Rosina. Inspired by this gesture, he went to the Maracanã to watch the Flamengo–Fluminense derby held on 8 August 1965. The match ended in a 0–0 tie. After the game, he remarked that he had never enjoyed scoreless matches—a statement that would become his last public comment on football.

Ricardo Riemer passed away on 12 August 1965, at the age of 81, in Rio de Janeiro. His career remains closely associated with the early years of Flamengo football; he was one of the club’s greatest idols and top scorers of the 1910s.

== Honours ==
Flamengo

- Campeonato Carioca: 1914, 1915

Individual

- CR Flamengo top scorer: 1914, 1915
