= Gumercindo Otero =

Brazilian footballer, doctor, teacher and politician (1893–1971)

Gumercindo
Personal information
- Full name: José Gumercindo Marquez Otero
- Date of birth: 22 September 1893
- Place of birth: Uberaba, Brazil
- Date of death: 17 November 1971 (aged 78)
- Place of death: São Paulo, Brazil
- Position: Forward

Youth career
- 1912–1913: Flamengo

Senior career*
Years	Team	Apps	(Gls)
1913–1916	Flamengo	37	(21)
- * Club domestic league appearances and goals

José Gumercindo Marquez Otero (Uberaba, 22 September 1893 – São Paulo, 17 November 1971), simply known as Gumercindo, was a Brazilian doctor, teacher, politician and footballer. He played as a forward for CR Flamengo from 1913 to 1916 and later distinguished himself in public life in Goiás, serving as secretary of Education and Health and as a state representative.

== Early life ==
José Gumercindo Marquez Otero was born in Uberaba, Minas Gerais, on 22 September 1893, the son of José Otero Fernandes and Maria Marquez. He lost his father at the age of eight. Later, his mother married Alfredo Lopes de Moraes, a politician associated with the city of Morrinhos, in Goiás.

He began his studies at Ginásio Nogueira da Gama in Jacareí, São Paulo, and completed his secondary education at Ginásio Diocesano de Uberaba. While still young, he moved to Rio de Janeiro, where he enrolled in college and studied medicine. During this time, he also stood out as a football player.

According to genealogical records, he had a sister named Maria Marquez de Moraes.

== Football career ==
Gumercindo was one of the first players in the football department of Clube de Regatas do Flamengo, founded in 1912. He initially played for the so-called ‘Segundos Quadros’ – a category equivalent to the reserves or youth players of the time – before earning a place in the first team and competing in the 1913 Campeonato Carioca.

Playing as a forward, he represented Flamengo between 1913 and 1916, a period during which he helped to consolidate the club’s footballing legacy. In 1913, he stood out as the team’s top scorer, netting nine goals that season. Among his most memorable performances were the two goals he scored in Flamengo’s 6–3 victory over rivals Fluminense.

The following year, he was one of the key players in Flamengo’s 1914 Campeonato Carioca campaign, which the club went on to win. He scored decisive goals throughout the campaign, including the winner in the 1–0 victory over Paysandu and important goals against Botafogo and America.

Gumercindo remained part of the squad that won back-to-back Carioca title in 1915. From that point onwards, his appearances became less frequent, until his final match in 1916. According to the club’s statistical records, he played 37 matches and scored 21 goals for Flamengo.

As Brazilian football was still an amateur sport, he chose to prioritize his academic studies. His dedication to his medical degree led to the early end of his sporting career, allowing him to focus entirely on his medical profession.

== Other occupations ==
He graduated with a degree in medicine from the Rio de Janeiro School of Medicine in 1918. After graduating, he undertook a specialization in tropical diseases in Guaratuba, Paraná and subsequently settled in Morrinhos, where he practiced medicine for nearly three decades.

In addition to his medical practice, he played a prominent role in public life in Goiás. In 1929, during the administration of his stepfather, Alfredo Lopes de Moraes, he assumed the position of Secretary of the Interior, Education, and Health for the state of Goiás. During his tenure, he promoted important educational reforms, including the modernization of education, the creation of the Complementary School, the reorganization of the Normal School, and the expansion of autonomy for teacher-training institutions.

After leaving office, he returned to Morrinhos, resuming his medical practice and also devoting himself to teaching at the Dr. Hermenegildo de Moraes Normal School.

In 1946, he was again invited to serve as Secretary of Education and Health for the state of Goiás during the administration of Eládio de Amorim. The following year, he was elected state representative for the National Democratic Union (UDN) with 1,599 votes (2% of total), serving until 1950.

After leaving the Legislative Assembly, he continued to participate in Goiás politics. With the dissolution of the UDN following the regime established in 1964, he joined the National Renewal Alliance (ARENA), of which he became honorary president.

== Personal life and death ==
During his stay in Goiás, he met Maria Aparecida Godoy in Caldas Novas, and they married. The couple had three children: Léo Otero, Lucy Otero, and Zita Otero.

Gumercindo maintained a strong connection with the city of Morrinhos throughout his life, both through his medical practice and his involvement in education and local and state politics.

He passed away in São Paulo on 17 November 1971, at the age of 78. As a posthumous tribute, the former Avenida Araguaia in Morrinhos was renamed Avenida Doutor Gumercindo Otero by Decree No. 86 of 1972, in recognition of his service to the municipality.

== Honours ==
Flamengo

- Campeonato Carioca: 1914, 1915

Individual

- CR Flamengo top scorer: 1913, 1916
