= Alberto Borgerth =

Brazilian footballer (1892–1958)

Borgerth
Personal information
- Full name: Alberto Borgerth
- Date of birth: 3 December 1892
- Place of birth: Rio de Janeiro, Brazil
- Date of death: 25 November 1958 (aged 65)
- Place of death: Rio de Janeiro, Brazil
- Position: Forward

Senior career*
Years	Team	Apps	(Gls)
1908–1911	Fluminense	15	(6)
1912–1916	Flamengo	50	(27)

Managerial career
- 1917: Brazil (comiteé)
- * Club domestic league appearances and goals as of 12 February 2024

Alberto Borgerth (3 December 1892 – 25 November 1958), was a Brazilian rower, footballer, medic, and chairman of Flamengo and FFERJ.

== Early life ==
Son of a Brazilian father and a Hungarian mother, Alberto was born on 3 December 1892 as the son of Dr. José de Siqueira Álvares Borgerth, who was head of security for Dom Pedro II during his second reign. He played sports since he was 13 years old, being a rower for CR Flamengo until he turned 16, when he started playing football.

== Career ==
He started playing football for Fluminense, from 1908 to 1911, participating in the conquest of three state titles, especially in 1911 when he played the most and scored two goals in a decisive victory over America. A medical student, he combined his studies with sports, playing just 15 matches for the club, which meant that in September 1911 the Fluminense technical committee barred Borgerth and other players in similar situations, who led a movement for these athletes to look for a new club to practice football, in this case, their former rowing club, CR Flamengo.

Besides Baena, Píndaro de Carvalho, Nery, Coriolano, Gilberto, Galo, Baiano, Arnaldo, Amarante and Gustavinho was part of the first starting XI in the history of CR Flamengo, 3 May 1912, in a 15–2 victory against SC Mangueira. On 15 November 1914, Borgerth scored one of the goals in Flamengo's victory over his former club Fluminense FC, which crowned the club's first title in football history. He would still become champion in 1915 and played until 1916, making 50 appearances and scoring 27 goals in total. In 1916 he retired from football to focus on completing his medical degree.

== Post career ==
In 1917 Borgerth was part of the technical committee of the Brazil national football team that competed in the 1917 South American Championship. In the following years he worked as a doctor at CR Flamengo, when in 1927 he was appointed president of the club. In 1950 he became president of the Rio de Janeiro federation (the currently FFERJ).

== Honours ==
Fluminense

- Campeonato Carioca: 1908, 1909, 1911

Flamengo

- Campeonato Carioca: 1914, 1915
