= Nery (footballer) =

Brazilian footballer (1892–1927)

Personal information
- Full name: Emmanuel Augusto Nery
- Date of birth: 25 December 1892
- Place of birth: Rio de Janeiro, Brazil
- Date of death: 5 November 1927 (aged 34)
- Place of death: Rio de Janeiro, Brazil
- Position: Defender

Senior career*
Years	Team	Apps	(Gls)
1910–1911	Fluminense		
1912–1919	Flamengo		

International career
1914–1916	Brazil	6	(0)
Medal record
Men's football
Representing Brazil
Copa América
Third place	1916 Argentina
- * Club domestic league appearances and goals

Emmanuel Augusto Nery (25 December 1892 – 5 November 1927), commonly known as Nery, was a Brazilian footballer who played as a defender. He was a member of the Brazilian squad at the 1916 Copa America, helping them finish third and win the bronze medal.

== Career ==
Nery started his career from Fluminense in 1910 and two years later he moved to crosstown rivals Flamengo where he played until 1919. He won the Campeonato Carioca three times and featured in the first official match of the Brazil national team against Exeter City in 1914.

He died in Rio de Janeiro in 1927, at the age of 34.

== Honours ==
Fluminense

- Campeonato Carioca: 1911

Flamengo

- Campeonato Carioca: 1914, 1915

Brazil

- Roca Cup: 1914
