= Galo (footballer) =

Brazilian footballer (1893–1978)

Personal information
- Full name: Armando de Almeida
- Date of birth: 2 July 1893
- Place of birth: Rio de Janeiro, Brazil
- Date of death: 6 February 1978 (aged 84)
- Position: Defensive midfielder

Senior career*
Years	Team	Apps	(Gls)
1909–1911	Fluminense		
1912–1918	Flamengo		

International career
1916–1919	Brazil	7	(0)
Medal record
Men's football
Representing Brazil
South American Championship
Winner	1919 Brazil
Third place	1916 Argentina
Third place	1917 Uruguay
- * Club domestic league appearances and goals

Armando de Almeida (2 July 1893 – 6 February 1978), known as Galo, was a Brazilian footballer who played as a defensive midfielder for Fluminense, Flamengo and the Brazil national team. He made seven appearances for the national team from 1916 to 1919. He was also part of Brazil's squad for the 1916, 1917, and 1919 South American Championships.

== Honours ==
Fluminense

- Campeonato Carioca: 1909, 1911

Flamengo

- Campeonato Carioca: 1914, 1915

Brazil

- Copa América: 1919
