= Taça da Prefeitura do Distrito Federal =

Football tournament in Brazil

The Taça da Prefeitura do Distrito Federal (Cup of the Prefecture of the Federal District), commonly also Torneio Municipal do Rio de Janeiro (Municipal Tournament of Rio de Janeiro), was a tournament for clubs of the then capital of Brazil Rio de Janeiro which was held for the first time in 1938 and which took place annually from 1943 to 1948. The last edition was in 1951. In 1996 the competition was revived for one more time as Taça Cidade Maravilhosa, the "Cup of the Marvellous City", after the byname of Rio de Janeiro. The importance of the tournament is subordinate and it always remained in the shadow of the state championship known as Campeonato Carioca.

The competition, which always took place before the start of the Campeonato Carioca, was usually held in a single round-robin league format, meaning without a return series. When teams finished even on points a deciding match was held. All of the teams that participated in the Campeonato Carioca took part in that competition, with the sole exception to the 1996 edition, when only the teams from Rio de Janeiro City that disputed the first level participated. As a consequence, the number of participants grew along with the championship's, going from nine in 1938 to eleven in 1951.

Fluminense, Flamengo, Botafogo, Vasco da Gama, America, and Bangu took part in all editions. Further participants were Bonsucesso, São Cristóvão, Madureira, Olaria and Canto do Rio from Niterói.

== Winners ==
- 1938: Fluminense
- 1943: São Cristóvão
- 1944: Vasco da Gama
- 1945: Vasco da Gama
- 1946: Vasco da Gama
- 1947: Vasco da Gama
- 1948: Fluminense
- 1951: Botafogo
- 1996: Botafogo
