= Antônio Menezes (footballer) =

Brazilian footballer

Menezes
Personal information
- Full name: Antônio Menezes
- Date of birth: 13 June 1925
- Place of birth: Miracema, Brazil
- Date of death: 18 July 1978 (aged 52)
- Place of death: Rio de Janeiro, Brazil
- Positions: Midfielder; forward

Senior career*
Years	Team	Apps	(Gls)
1942–1955	Bangu	333	(138)
- * Club domestic league appearances and goals as of 17 February 2024

Antônio Menezes (13 June 1925 – 18 July 1978), better known as Menezes, was a Brazilian professional footballer who played as a midfielder and forward.

== Career ==
Menezes was part of what is considered the best team in the history of Bangu AC, playing alongside great players like Zózimo and Zizinho. He played for the club throughout his career, from 1942 to 1955, playing in 333 matches and scoring 138 goals. On 13 July 1946 he scored 4 goals in 26 minutes in Bangu's historic 6–2 victory against Vasco da Gama, and in 1951 he was part of the team that toured Europe alongside São Paulo FC. After retiring, he worked in the weaving business. Menezes was top scorer in the 1952 Campeonato Carioca, alongside Zizinho, with 19 goals.

== Honours ==
Bangu

- Torneio Início do Rio-São Paulo: 1951

Individual

- 1952 Campeonato Carioca top scorer: 19 goals
