= Fefeu =

Brazilian footballer (1940–2010)

Personal information
- Full name: Alfredo de Souza
- Date of birth: 18 May 1940
- Place of birth: Niterói, Brazil
- Date of death: 6 March 2010 (aged 69)
- Place of death: São Gonçalo, Brazil
- Position: Midfielder

Youth career
- Fonseca

Senior career*
Years	Team	Apps	(Gls)
1959–1960	Fonseca		
1960–1963	Canto do Rio		
1962	→ Vitória (loan)		
1964–1966	Flamengo	62	(22)
1966–1968	São Paulo	59	(8)
1968	→ Bangu (loan)	3	(0)

International career
1966	Brazil	1	(0)
- * Club domestic league appearances and goals as of 6 November 2023

Alfredo de Souza (18 May 1940 – 6 March 2010), better known as Fefeu, was a Brazilian professional footballer who played as a midfielder.

== Career ==
Born in Niterói, he started playing for Fonseca AC, which was competing in the Campeonato Fluminense at the time. He transferred to Canto do Rio, a club in the same city, but which played in the Guanabara league. After standing out in 1963, he was hired by Flamengo, where he was champion in 1965. He was acquired by São Paulo in 1966. Ended his career at Bangu AC, after suffering an injury in the 1968 Torneio Roberto Gomes Pedrosa.

Fefeu played a single official match for the Brazil national team, 15 May 1966, a 1-1 vs. Chile, being Brazil's first game at the Estádio do Morumbi.

== Honours ==
Flamengo

- Campeonato Carioca: 1965
