= Torneio Início Carioca =

Torneio Início
- Organising body: Various
- Founded: 1916
- Abolished: 1977
- Region: Rio de Janeiro (state), Brazil
- Related competitions: Campeonato Carioca
- Most successful club(s): Vasco da Gama (10 titles)

The Torneio Início Carioca (English: Campeonato Carioca Warm-up Tournament) was a traditional tournament that took place in Brazil marking the start date of the state championships.

== Format ==
The matches were held with 20 or 30 minutes, and many times, corners served as a tiebreaker. These matches, as they do not follow the criteria established by FIFA, are not considered official, only the tournaments are endorsed by the respective organizing federations of the state championships.

== List of champions ==
Following is the list with all the champions of the Torneio Início Carioca:

Season	Champions	Runners-up
1916	Fluminense (1)	America
1917	Not held	
1918	São Cristóvão (1)	Fluminense
1919	Carioca (1)	Fluminense
1920	Flamengo (1)	São Cristóvão
1921	Palmeiras (1)	Vasco da Gama
1922	Flamengo (2)	Andarahy
1923	Mackenzie (1)	Flamengo
1924 (AMEA)	Fluminense (2)	Flamengo
1924 (LMDT)	Andarahy (1)	Unknown
1925	Fluminense (3)	São Cristóvão
1926	Vasco da Gama (1)	Flamengo
1927	~~Fluminense~~	São Cristóvão
1928	São Cristóvão (2)	Flamengo
1929	Vasco da Gama (2)	America
1930	Vasco da Gama (3)	Bangu
1931	Vasco da Gama (4)	Fluminense
1932	Vasco da Gama (5)	Botafogo
1933	São Cristóvão (3)	Botafogo
1934 (AMEA)	Botafogo (1)	Mavilis
1934 (LCF)	Bangu (1)	America
1935–1936	Not held	
1937 (FMD)	São Cristóvão (4)	Botafogo
1938	Botafogo (2)	São Cristóvão
1939	Madureira (1)	Flamengo
1940	Fluminense (4)	São Cristóvão
1941	Fluminense (5)	Madureira
1942	Vasco da Gama (6)	Madureira
1943	Fluminense (6)	Madureira
1944	Vasco da Gama (7)	Flamengo
1945	Vasco da Gama (8)	Botafogo
1946	Flamengo (3)	America
1947	Botafogo (3)	Olaria
1948	Vasco da Gama (9)	Olaria
1949	America (1)	Bangu
1950	Bangu (2)	Vasco da Gama
1951	Flamengo (4)	Bangu
1952	Flamengo (5)	Vasco da Gama
1953	Canto do Rio (1)	Vasco da Gama
1954	Fluminense (7)	Flamengo
1955	Bangu (3)	Vasco da Gama
1956	Fluminense (8)	Bonsucesso
1957	Madureira (2)	Vasco da Gama
1958	Vasco da Gama (10)	Madureira
1959	Flamengo (6)	Madureira
1960	Olaria (1)	Flamengo
1961	Botafogo (4)	Flamengo
1962	Botafogo (5)	Canto do Rio
1963	Botafogo (6)	Campo Grande
1964	Bangu (4)	São Cristóvão
1965	Fluminense (9)	Flamengo
1966	Not held	
1967	Botafogo (7)	Madureira
1968–1976	Not held	
1977	Botafogo (8)	Vasco da Gama

Notes

The 1927 Torneio Início was declared null due to the fact that Fluminense had selected two players from their second team in the competition, which was vetoed.

== Titles by team ==
Rank	Club	Winners	Winning years
1	Vasco da Gama	10	1926, 1929, 1930, 1931, 1932, 1942, 1944, 1945, 1948, 1958
2	Fluminense	9	1916, 1924 (AMEA), 1925, 1940, 1941, 1943, 1954, 1956, 1965
3	Botafogo	8	1934 (AMEA), 1938, 1947, 1961, 1962, 1963, 1967, 1977
4	Flamengo	6	1920, 1922, 1946, 1951, 1952, 1959
5	Bangu	4	1934 (LCF), 1950, 1955, 1964
5	São Cristóvão	4	1918, 1928, 1933, 1937 (FMD)
7	Madureira	2	1939, 1947
8	America	1	1949
8	Andarahy	1	1924 (LMDT)
8	Canto do Rio	1	1953
8	Carioca	1	1919
8	Mackenzie	1	1923
8	Olaria	1	1960
8	Palmeiras	1	1921

== See also ==
- Torneio Início Paulista
