= Veludo =

Brazilian footballer

Personal information
- Full name: Caetano da Silva Nascimento
- Date of birth: 7 August 1930
- Place of birth: Rio de Janeiro, Brazil
- Date of death: 26 October 1979 (aged 49)
- Position: Goalkeeper

Senior career*
Years	Team	Apps	(Gls)
1949–1956	Fluminense		
1956	Canto do Rio		
1957–1958	Santos		
1959–1961	Atlético Mineiro		
1961–1962	Madureira		
1963	Renascença		

International career
1954–1956	Brazil	8	(0)
- * Club domestic league appearances and goals

Caetano da Silva Nascimento, nicknamed "Veludo" (7 August 1930 – 26 October 1979) was a Brazilian football player. He played for the Brazil national football team at the 1954 FIFA World Cup finals.

Veludo played club football for Fluminense, Canto do Rio, Santos, Atlético Mineiro, Madureira and Renascença, winning the Campeonato Carioca in 1951 with Fluminense and the Campeonato Mineiro in 1958 with Atlético Mineiro.
