= Nelson (footballer, born 1913) =

Brazilian footballer (1913–?)

Personal information
- Full name: Nelson Amorim Magalhães
- Date of birth: 17 May 1913
- Place of birth: Rio de Janeiro, Brazil
- Date of death: Unknown
- Position: Forward

Senior career*
Years	Team	Apps	(Gls)
1931–1936	Flamengo	149	(90)
- * Club domestic league appearances and goals as of 12 February 2024

Nelson Amorim Magalhães (17 May 1913 – ?), simply known as Nelson, was a Brazilian footballer who played as a forward.

== Career ==
A striker, Nelson played for Flamengo from 1931 to 1936, making 149 appearances and scoring 90 goals in total (some sources indicate 86). Little is known about the athlete before and after his time at the Flamengo, but he accomplished great feats for the club in the 1930s, such as scoring 6 goals in the Flamengo 16–2 River Foot-Ball Club game in the 1933 Campeonato Carioca.

On 11 December 1932, Nelson was part of the representation of the Brazilian team that played a friendly against Nacional.

== Honours ==
Flamengo

- Torneio Extra: 1934
- Torneio Aberto do Rio de Janeiro: 1936
