= 1952 Campeonato Carioca =

Campeonato Carioca
- Season: 1952
- Champions: Vasco da Gama
- Matches played: 110
- Goals scored: 436 (3.96 per match)
- Top goalscorer: Menezes (Bangu); Zizinho (Bangu) – 19 goals
- Biggest home win: Flamengo 9-0 São Cristóvão (October 10, 1952)
- Biggest away win: Bangu 2-6 Vasco da Gama (September 6, 1952)
- Highest scoring: Olaria 9-1 Bonsucesso (December 14, 1952)

The 1952 edition of the Campeonato Carioca kicked off on August 17, 1952 and ended on January 22, 1953. It was organized by FMF (Federação Metropolitana de Futebol, or Metropolitan Football Federation). Eleven teams participated. Vasco da Gama won the title for the 10th time. no teams were relegated.

== System ==
The tournament would be disputed in a double round-robin format, with the team with the most points winning the title.

== Extra Tournament ==
After the last edition of the Torneio Municipal, another tournament, officially called the Taça Carlos Martins da Rocha, popularly known as the Torneio Extra, was created to fill the gap in the clubs' schedules in the beginning of the year. That tournament only lasted one season, as the championship expanded to twelve teams in the following year.

Twelve teams disputed that tournament; the eleven league teams and Oriente AC, champion of the amateur championship held by the Departamento Autônomo. They were divided into two groups of six, in which the teams within each group played each other in a single round-robin format, with the two best teams in each group qualifying into the Final phase, also played in a single round-robin format.

=== First phase ===
==== Group A ====
Pos	Team	Pld	W	D	L	GF	GA	GD	Pts	Qualification or relegation
1	Botafogo	5	5	0	0	19	7	+12	10	Qualified
2	Bonsucesso	5	3	1	1	17	9	+8	7	Qualified
3	Fluminense	5	2	0	3	7	10	−3	4	
4	Olaria	5	2	0	3	12	16	−4	4	
5	Vasco da Gama	5	1	1	3	6	13	−7	3	
6	Canto do Rio	5	1	0	4	7	13	−6	2	

Updated to match(es) played on June 1, 1952. Source: RSSSF.com
Rules for classification: 1) points; 2) goal difference; 3) wins; 4) number of goals scored.

==== Group B ====
Pos	Team	Pld	W	D	L	GF	GA	GD	Pts	Qualification or relegation
1	América	5	4	0	1	15	6	+9	8	Qualified
2	Flamengo	5	4	0	1	13	6	+7	8	Qualified
3	Bangu	5	3	0	2	15	7	+8	6	
4	São Cristóvão	5	1	1	3	8	15	−7	3	
5	Madureira	5	1	1	3	12	20	−8	3	
6	Oriente	5	1	0	4	12	21	−9	2	

Updated to match(es) played on June 1, 1952. Source: RSSSF.com
Rules for classification: 1) points; 2) goal difference; 3) wins; 4) number of goals scored.

=== Final phase ===
Pos	Team	Pld	W	D	L	GF	GA	GD	Pts	Qualification or relegation
1	América	3	2	1	0	5	2	+3	5	Champions
2	Flamengo	3	2	0	1	5	3	+2	4	
3	Bonsucesso	2	0	1	1	4	5	−1	1 (Note: Botafogo and Bonsucesso didn't play their last match)	
4	Botafogo	2	0	0	2	0	4	−4	0	

Updated to match(es) played on June 28, 1952. Source: RSSSF.com
Rules for classification: 1) points; 2) goal difference; 3) wins; 4) number of goals scored.

== Championship ==
Pos	Team	Pld	W	D	L	GF	GA	GD	Pts	Qualification or relegation
1	Vasco da Gama	20	17	2	1	49	18	+31	36	Champions
2	Flamengo	20	14	2	4	59	22	+37	30	
3	Fluminense	20	14	2	4	49	23	+26	30	
4	Bangu	20	12	1	7	62	40	+22	25	
5	Botafogo	20	9	4	7	46	38	+8	22	
6	América	20	8	2	10	37	36	+1	18	
7	Olaria	20	6	4	10	36	42	−6	16	
8	Madureira	20	6	2	12	35	51	−16	14	
9	São Cristóvão	20	4	2	14	32	61	−29	10	
10	Canto do Rio	20	2	6	12	24	58	−34	10	
11	Bonsucesso	20	2	5	13	27	67	−40	9	

Updated to match(es) played on January 22, 1953. Source: RSSSF.com
Rules for classification: 1) points; 2) goal difference; 3) wins; 4) number of goals scored.
