= 1913 in Brazilian football =

Football in Brazil
- Season: 1913

The following article presents a summary of the 1913 football (soccer) season in Brazil, which was the 12th season of competitive football in the country.

== Campeonato Paulista ==
In 1913 there were two different editions of the Campeonato Paulista. One was organized by the Associação Paulista de Esportes Atléticos (APEA) while the other one was organized by the Liga Paulista de Foot-Ball (LPF).

=== APEA's Campeonato Paulista ===
Final Standings

| Position | Team | Points | Played | Won | Drawn | Lost | For | Against | Difference |
|---|---|---|---|---|---|---|---|---|---|
| 1 | Paulistano | 7 | 6 | 3 | 1 | 2 | 8 | 13 | −5 |
| 2 | Mackenzie | 6 | 6 | 3 | 0 | 3 | 16 | 12 | 4 |
| 3 | AA das Palmeiras | 5 | 6 | 2 | 1 | 3 | 12 | 11 | 1 |

Paulistano declared as the APEA's Campeonato Paulista champions.

=== LPF's Campeonato Paulista ===
Final Standings

| Position | Team | Points | Played | Won | Drawn | Lost | For | Against | Difference |
|---|---|---|---|---|---|---|---|---|---|
| 1 | Americano-SP | 13 | 8 | 5 | 3 | 0 | 24 | 5 | 19 |
| 2 | Ypiranga-SP | 9 | 8 | 3 | 3 | 2 | 10 | 8 | 2 |
| 3 | SC Internacional de São Paulo | 8 | 8 | 3 | 2 | 3 | 14 | 13 | 1 |
| 4 | Corinthians | 6 | 8 | 1 | 4 | 3 | 8 | 16 | −8 |
| 5 | Germânia | 5 | 8 | 2 | 0 | 6 | 9 | 23 | −14 |
| 6 | Santos | – | – | – | – | – | – | – | – |

Santos matches were canceled, as the club abandoned the competition.

Americano-SP declared as the LPF's Campeonato Paulista champions.

== State championship champions ==
| State | Champion |
|---|---|
| Bahia | Fluminense de Salvador |
| Rio de Janeiro (DF) | America |
| São Paulo | Paulistano (by APEA); Americano-SP (by LPF) |
