= 1913 Campeonato Carioca =

Campeonato Carioca
- Season: 1913
- Champions: América
- Relegated: Americano; Bangu; Mangueira
- Matches: 58
- Goals: 254 (4.38 per match)
- Top goalscorer: Mimi Sodré (Botafogo) – 13 goals
- Biggest home win: Flamengo 11-0 Mangueira (June 29, 1913)
- Biggest away win: Americano 0-6 São Cristóvão (August 10, 1913)
- Highest scoring: Flamengo 11-0 Mangueira (June 29, 1913)

The 1913 Campeonato Carioca, the eighth edition of that championship, kicked off on May 3, 1913, and ended on December 7, 1913. It was organized by LMSA (Liga Metropolitana de Sports Athleticos, or Metropolitan Athletic Sports League). Ten teams participated. América won the title for the 1st time. Americano, Bangu, and Mangueira were relegated.

== Participating teams ==
In February 1913, AFRJ and LMSA reconciled, with the former being absorbed into the latter. Originally, the championship would have 13 clubs: all the LMSA teams that had disputed the previous year's championship, and the five best teams in AFRJ's championship. However, in March, the clubs voted for reducing the championship to ten teams, and Cattete, Paulistano, and Germânia found themselves relegated to the Second Level; As a protest, Germânia retired from the league altogether.

Club	Home location	Previous season
América	Tijuca, Rio de Janeiro	3rd (LMSA)
Americano	Vila Isabel, Rio de Janeiro	2nd (AFRJ)
Bangu	Bangu, Rio de Janeiro	6th (LMSA)
Botafogo	Botafogo, Rio de Janeiro	1st (AFRJ)
Flamengo	Flamengo, Rio de Janeiro	2nd (LMSA)
Fluminense	Laranjeiras, Rio de Janeiro	5th (LMSA)
Mangueira	Tijuca, Rio de Janeiro	8th (LMSA)
Paysandu	Flamengo, Rio de Janeiro	1st (LMSA)
Rio Cricket	Praia Grande, Niterói	4th (LMSA)
São Cristóvão	São Cristóvão, Rio de Janeiro	7th (LMSA)

== System ==
The tournament would be divided in two stages:

- First round: The ten teams all played against each other in a single round-robin format. The seven best teams qualified to the Second phase and the bottom three were relegated.
- Second round: The remaining six teams all played in a single round-robin format against each other. The team with the most points in the sum of both stages won the title.

== Championship ==
=== First round ===
Pos	Team	Pld	W	D	L	GF	GA	GD	Pts	Qualification or relegation
1	América	9	8	0	1	32	5	+27	16	
2	Botafogo	9	7	0	2	26	8	+18	14	
3	Paysandu	9	5	2	2	20	14	+6	12	
4	Flamengo	9	5	1	3	28	12	+16	11	
5	Fluminense	9	4	1	4	34	25	+9	9	
6	São Cristóvão	9	3	3	3	21	24	−3	9	
7	Rio Cricket	9	3	2	4	13	16	−3	8	
8	Mangueira	9	3	0	6	12	42	−30	6	Relegated
9	Bangu	9	1	3	5	10	22	−12	5	Relegated
10	Americano	9	0	0	9	3	31	−28	0	Relegated

Updated to match(es) played on September 13, 1913. Source: RSSSF.com
Rules for classification: 1) points; 2) goal difference; 3) wins; 4) number of goals scored.

=== Second round ===
Pos	Team	Pld	W	D	L	GF	GA	GD	Pts
1	Flamengo	6	5	1	0	15	1	+14	11
2	Botafogo	6	3	2	1	7	4	+3	8
3	América	6	4	0	2	8	7	+1	8
4	Paysandu	6	2	1	3	9	11	−2	5
5	Fluminense	6	1	2	3	10	13	−3	4
6	Rio Cricket	6	1	1	4	5	11	−6	3
7	São Cristóvão	6	1	1	4	1	8	−7	3

Updated to match(es) played on December 7, 1913. Source: RSSSF.com
Rules for classification: 1) points; 2) goal difference; 3) wins; 4) number of goals scored.

=== Final standings ===
Pos	Team	Pld	W	D	L	GF	GA	GD	Pts	Qualification or relegation
1	América	15	12	0	3	40	12	+28	24	Champions
2	Flamengo	15	10	2	3	43	13	+30	22	
3	Botafogo	15	10	2	3	33	12	+21	22	
4	Paysandu	15	7	3	5	29	25	+4	17	
5	Fluminense	15	5	3	7	44	38	+6	13	
6	São Cristóvão	15	4	4	7	22	32	−10	12	
7	Rio Cricket	15	4	3	8	18	27	−9	11	
8	Mangueira	9	3	0	6	12	42	−30	6	Relegated
9	Bangu	9	1	3	5	10	22	−12	5	Relegated
10	Americano	9	0	0	9	3	31	−28	0	Relegated

Updated to match(es) played on December 7, 1913. Source: RSSSF.com
Rules for classification: 1) points; 2) goal difference; 3) wins; 4) number of goals scored.
