= Durval (footballer, born 1925) =

Brazilian footballer

Personal information
- Full name: Durval Corrêa Santos
- Date of birth: August 4, 1925
- Place of birth: Fernão Velho, Brazil
- Date of death: 19 July 1982 (aged 56)
- Place of death: Rio de Janeiro, Brazil
- Position: Forward

Youth career
- –1943: Madureira

Senior career*
Years	Team	Apps	(Gls)
1943–1947	Madureira		
1948–1951	Flamengo	132	(127)
1951–1953	São Paulo	71	(30)
- * Club domestic league appearances and goals as of 23 September 2023

Durval Corrêa Santos (4 August 1925 – 19 July 1982), simply known as Durval, was a Brazilian professional footballer who played as a forward.

== Career ==
Durval began his career at Madureira, and in 1948 he was signed by Flamengo. Scored 7 goals in the same match playing for Flamengo, on 30 April 1950, against Campos AA (the game ended 13–1). Still played for São Paulo FC before retiring, where he was state champion of São Paulo in 1953.

== Honours ==
São Paulo

- Campeonato Paulista: 1953
