= 1944 Campeonato Carioca =

Campeonato Carioca
- Season: 1944
- Champions: Flamengo
- Matches played: 90
- Goals scored: 379 (4.21 per match)
- Top goalscorer: Geraldino (Canto do Rio) – 19 goals
- Biggest home win: Vasco da Gama 8-1 Bonsucesso (July 23, 1944)
- Biggest away win: Bonsucesso 1-6 Fluminense (October 15, 1944)
- Highest scoring: Vasco da Gama 8-1 Bonsucesso (July 23, 1944); Vasco da Gama 7-2 Bangu (August 20, 1944); Bonsucesso 5-4 Bangu (October 29, 1944)

The 1944 edition of the Campeonato Carioca kicked off on July 1, 1944 and ended on October 29, 1944. It was organized by FMF (Federação Metropolitana de Futebol, or Metropolitan Football Federation). Ten teams participated. Flamengo won the title for the 10th time. no teams were relegated.

== System ==
The tournament would be disputed in a double round-robin format, with the team with the most points winning the title.

== Torneio Relâmpago ==
Pos	Team	Pld	W	D	L	GF	GA	GD	Pts	Qualification or relegation
1	Vasco da Gama	4	3	1	0	14	4	+10	7	Champions
2	Botafogo	4	2	1	1	11	8	+3	5	
3	América	4	1	2	1	8	11	−3	4	
4	Flamengo	4	1	1	2	10	15	−5	3	
5	Fluminense	4	0	1	3	4	9	−5	1	

Updated to match(es) played on March 22, 1944. Source: RSSSF.com
Rules for classification: 1) points; 2) goal difference; 3) wins; 4) number of goals scored.

== Torneio Municipal ==
Pos	Team	Pld	W	D	L	GF	GA	GD	Pts	Qualification or relegation
1	Vasco da Gama	9	7	1	1	23	12	+11	15	Champions
2	América	9	6	2	1	27	13	+14	14	
3	Canto do Rio	9	4	3	2	18	13	+5	11	
4	Fluminense	9	4	2	3	14	15	−1	10	
5	Flamengo	9	3	3	3	19	18	+1	9	
6	São Cristóvão	9	3	3	3	18	19	−1	9	
7	Botafogo	9	3	2	4	22	19	+3	8	
8	Bangu	9	3	0	6	19	28	−9	6	
9	Madureira	9	1	3	5	13	19	−6	5	
10	Bonsucesso	9	1	1	7	9	26	−17	3	

Updated to match(es) played on June 25, 1944. Source: RSSSF.com
Rules for classification: 1) points; 2) goal difference; 3) wins; 4) number of goals scored.

== Championship ==
Pos	Team	Pld	W	D	L	GF	GA	GD	Pts	Qualification or relegation
1	Flamengo	18	13	2	3	50	18	+32	28	Champions
2	Vasco da Gama	18	12	2	4	53	27	+26	26	
3	Botafogo	18	12	2	4	38	21	+17	26	
4	Fluminense	18	10	4	4	45	27	+18	24	
5	América	18	9	3	6	42	37	+5	21	
6	Canto do Rio	18	6	5	7	34	37	−3	17	
7	Madureira	18	5	2	11	35	44	−9	12	
8	São Cristóvão	18	4	2	12	24	36	−12	10	
9	Bangu	18	4	2	12	38	66	−28	10	
10	Bonsucesso	18	2	2	14	20	66	−46	6	

Updated to match(es) played on October 29, 1944. Source: RSSSF.com
Rules for classification: 1) points; 2) goal difference; 3) wins; 4) number of goals scored.

== Top Scores ==
Rank	Player	Club	Goals
1	Geraldino	Canto do Rio	23
2	Lelé	Vasco da Gama	16
3	Sylvio Pirillo	Flamengo	13
4	Magnones	Fluminense	12
4	Ademir de Menezes	Vasco da Gama	12
