= 1954 Torneio Rio-São Paulo =

Torneio Rio-São Paulo
- Season: 1954
- Champions: Corinthians (3rd title)
- Matches played: 45
- Goals scored: 152 (3.38 per match)
- Top goalscorer: Dino da Costa (Botafogo); Simões (America) – 7 goals each
- Biggest home win: Botafogo 5–1 São Paulo (26 Jun)

The 1954 Torneio Rio São Paulo was the 8th edition of the Torneio Rio-São Paulo. It was disputed between 15 May to 11 July.

== Participants ==
Team	City	Nº participations	Best result
America	Rio de Janeiro	5	6th (1951)
Botafogo	Rio de Janeiro	5	4th (1953)
Corinthians	(São Paulo (state)) São Paulo	8	Champions: 1950, 1953
Flamengo	Rio de Janeiro	7	4th (1951)
Fluminense	Rio de Janeiro	7	4th (1952)
Palmeiras	(São Paulo (state)) São Paulo	8	Champions: 1933, 1951
Portuguesa	(São Paulo (state)) São Paulo	8	Champions: 1952
Santos	(São Paulo (state)) Santos	5	5th (1952)
São Paulo	(São Paulo (state)) São Paulo	8	Runners-up: 1933
Vasco da Gama	Rio de Janeiro	8	Runners-up: 1950, 1952, 1953

== Format ==
The tournament were disputed in a single round-robin format, with the club with most points conquered being the champions.

== Tournament ==
Following is the summary of the 1954 Torneio Rio-São Paulo tournament:

Pos	Team	Pld	W	D	L	GF	GA	GD	Pts
1	(São Paulo (state)) Corinthians (C)	9	7	0	2	17	11	+6	14
2	Fluminense	9	6	1	2	18	8	+10	13
3	(São Paulo (state)) Palmeiras	9	5	2	2	15	11	+4	12
4	(São Paulo (state)) São Paulo	9	4	2	3	10	11	−1	10
5	Vasco da Gama	9	4	1	4	14	17	−3	9
6	(São Paulo (state)) Santos	9	4	0	5	16	15	+1	8
7	Flamengo	9	3	1	5	10	14	−4	7
8	(São Paulo (state)) Portuguesa	9	3	0	6	17	19	−2	6 (Note: Tied in points)
9	America	9	3	0	6	18	22	−4	6
10	Botafogo	9	2	1	6	17	24	−7	5

Source: RSSSF
Rules for classification: 1) points; 2) wins; 3) goal difference; 4) goals for.
(C) Champions
