= 1959 Torneio Rio-São Paulo =

Torneio Rio-São Paulo
- Season: 1959
- Champions: Santos (1st title)
- Matches played: 45
- Goals scored: 173 (3.84 per match)
- Top goalscorer: Henrique Frade (Flamengo) – 9 goals
- Biggest home win: Flamengo 7–2 America (16 Apr)

The 1959 Torneio Rio São Paulo was the 12th edition of the Torneio Rio-São Paulo. It was disputed between 8 April to 17 May.

== Participants ==
Team	City	Nº participations	Best result
America	Rio de Janeiro	9	6th (1951)
Botafogo	Rio de Janeiro	9	3rd (1955)
Corinthians	(São Paulo (state)) São Paulo	12	Champions: 1950, 1953, 1954
Flamengo	Rio de Janeiro	11	Runners-up: 1957, 1958
Fluminense	Rio de Janeiro	11	Champions: 1957
Palmeiras	(São Paulo (state)) São Paulo	12	Champions: 1933, 1951
Portuguesa	(São Paulo (state)) São Paulo	12	Champions: 1952, 1955
Santos	(São Paulo (state)) Santos	9	4th (1957)
São Paulo	(São Paulo (state)) São Paulo	12	Runners-up: 1933
Vasco da Gama	Rio de Janeiro	12	Champions: 1958

== Format ==
The tournament were disputed in a single round-robin format, with the club with most points conquered being the champions.

== Tournament ==
Following is the summary of the 1959 Torneio Rio-São Paulo tournament:

Pos	Team	Pld	W	D	L	GF	GA	GD	Pts
1	(São Paulo (state)) Santos (C)	9	6	1	2	24	16	+8	13
2	Vasco da Gama	9	4	4	1	12	6	+6	12
3	Flamengo	9	5	1	3	24	15	+9	11
4	(São Paulo (state)) Palmeiras	9	5	0	4	17	19	−2	10 (Note: Tied in points)
5	(São Paulo (state)) São Paulo	9	4	2	3	23	22	+1	10
6	America	9	4	1	4	19	23	−4	9
7	Botafogo	9	4	0	5	15	16	−1	8
8	Fluminense	9	2	2	5	13	14	−1	6 (Note: Tied in points)
9	(São Paulo (state)) Corinthians	9	2	2	5	10	21	−11	6
10	(São Paulo (state)) Portuguesa	9	2	1	6	16	21	−5	5

Source: RSSSF
Rules for classification: 1) points; 2) wins; 3) goal difference; 4) goals for.
(C) Champions
