= 1938 Campeonato Carioca =

Campeonato Carioca
- Season: 1938
- Champions: Fluminense
- Matches played: 72
- Goals scored: 339 (4.71 per match)
- Top goalscorer: Leônidas (Flamengo); Carvalho Leite (Botafogo) – 16 goals
- Biggest home win: Botafogo 11-3 Madureira (January 1, 1939)
- Biggest away win: Bonsucesso 0-8 Fluminense (October 2, 1938)
- Highest scoring: Botafogo 11-3 Madureira (January 1, 1939)

The 1938 edition of the Campeonato Carioca kicked off on August 27, 1938 and ended on January 8, 1939. It was organized by LFRJ (Liga de Futebol do Rio de Janeiro, or Rio de Janeiro Football League). Nine teams participated. Fluminense won the title for the 12th time. no teams were relegated.

== System ==
The tournament would be disputed in a double round-robin format, with the team with the most points winning the title.

== Torneio Municipal ==
Pos	Team	Pld	W	D	L	GF	GA	GD	Pts	Qualification or relegation
1	Fluminense	16	11	1	4	39	18	+21	23	Champions
2	São Cristóvão	16	9	2	5	36	30	+6	20	
3	Vasco da Gama	16	8	2	6	38	28	+10	18	
4	Botafogo	16	8	2	6	46	40	+6	18	
5	Bangu	16	8	2	6	47	43	+4	18	
6	Madureira	16	5	3	8	29	36	−7	13	
7	América	16	3	6	7	27	42	−15	12	
8	Flamengo	16	5	1	10	30	37	−7	11	
9	Bonsucesso	16	4	3	9	32	50	−18	11	

Updated to match(es) played on August 14, 1938. Source: RSSSF.com
Rules for classification: 1) points; 2) goal difference; 3) wins; 4) number of goals scored.

== Championship ==
Pos	Team	Pld	W	D	L	GF	GA	GD	Pts	Qualification or relegation
1	Fluminense	16	12	2	2	53	22	+31	26	Champions
2	Flamengo	16	10	2	4	47	22	+25	22	
3	Botafogo	16	8	3	5	44	27	+17	19	
4	Vasco da Gama	16	7	5	4	37	27	+10	19	
5	América	16	8	2	6	38	30	+8	18	
6	Bangu	16	5	3	8	31	40	−9	13	
7	Bonsucesso	16	3	4	9	29	68	−39	10	
8	São Cristóvão	16	3	3	10	28	51	−23	9	
9	Madureira	16	3	2	11	32	52	−20	8	

Updated to match(es) played on January 8, 1939. Source: RSSSF.com
Rules for classification: 1) points; 2) goal difference; 3) wins; 4) number of goals scored.
