= 1986 Campeonato Carioca =

Campeonato Carioca
- Season: 1986
- Champions: Flamengo
- Copa Brasil: Americano; Goytacaz
- Matches played: 135
- Goals scored: 270 (2 per match)
- Top goalscorer: Romário (Vasco da Gama) - 20 goals
- Biggest home win: Vasco da Gama 6-0 Goytacaz (February 16, 1986); Vasco da Gama 7-1 Portuguesa (March 2, 1986)
- Biggest away win: Portuguesa 0-4 Flamengo (February 26, 1986); Campo Grande 0-4 Goytacaz (May 18, 1986); Olaria 0-4 Vasco da Gama (May 21, 1986); Americano 0-4 Bangu (June 8, 1986)
- Highest scoring: Vasco da Gama 7-1 Portuguesa (March 2, 1986)

The 1986 edition of the Campeonato Carioca kicked off on February 16, 1986 and ended on August 10, 1986. It is the official tournament organized by FFERJ (Federação de Futebol do Estado do Rio de Janeiro, or Rio de Janeiro State Football Federation. Only clubs based in the Rio de Janeiro State are allowed to play. Twelve teams contested this edition. Flamengo won the title for the 22nd time. no teams were relegated.

== System ==
The tournament would be divided in three stages:

- Taça Guanabara: The twelve teams all played in a single round-robin format against each other. The champions qualified to the final phase.
- Taça Rio: The twelve teams all played in a single round-robin format against each other. The champions qualified to the final phase.
- Final phase: The champions of the two stages, plus the team with the best overall record would play that phase. in case three different teams qualified, each team played in a single round-robin format against each other and the team with the most points won the title. in case the same team won one of the states and was the team with the best record, they would hold a three-match final series against the other stage winner.

== Championship ==
=== Taça Guanabara ===
Pos	Team	Pld	W	D	L	GF	GA	GD	Pts	Qualification or relegation
1	Vasco da Gama	11	8	2	1	29	7	+22	18	Qualified to Finals
2	Flamengo	11	7	2	2	21	7	+14	16	
3	Botafogo	11	6	3	2	15	6	+9	15	
4	Fluminense	11	7	1	3	14	13	+1	15	
5	Campo Grande	11	4	4	3	9	11	−2	12	
6	Bangu	11	5	1	5	10	9	+1	11	
7	Goytacaz	11	2	5	4	10	13	−3	9	
8	Olaria	11	2	5	4	5	11	−6	9	
9	América	11	3	2	6	10	15	−5	8	
10	Mesquita	11	3	2	6	8	15	−7	8	
11	Americano	11	0	6	5	4	14	−10	6	
12	Portuguesa	11	0	5	6	7	21	−14	5	

Updated to match(es) played on April 20, 1986. Source: RSSSF.com
Rules for classification: 1) points; 2) wins; 3) goal difference; 4) number of goals scored.

=== Taça Rio ===
Pos	Team	Pld	W	D	L	GF	GA	GD	Pts	Qualification or relegation
1	Flamengo	11	7	3	1	22	10	+12	17	Qualified to Finals
2	Fluminense	11	7	2	2	15	3	+12	16	
3	Vasco da Gama	11	6	1	4	21	13	+8	13	
4	Bangu	11	4	5	2	15	7	+8	13	
5	Botafogo	11	5	2	4	9	9	0	12	
6	América	11	3	6	2	10	11	−1	12	
7	Campo Grande	11	3	5	3	6	11	−5	11	
8	Americano	11	3	4	4	8	13	−5	10	
9	Mesquita	11	2	5	4	5	10	−5	9	
10	Goytacaz	11	2	3	6	8	12	−4	7	
11	Portuguesa	11	2	3	6	2	12	−10	7	
12	Olaria	11	2	1	8	5	15	−10	5	

Updated to match(es) played on June 27, 1986. Source: RSSSF.com
Rules for classification: 1) points; 2) wins; 3) goal difference; 4) number of goals scored.

=== Aggregate table ===
Pos	Team	Pld	W	D	L	GF	GA	GD	Pts	Qualification or relegation
1	Flamengo	22	14	5	3	43	17	+26	33	Qualified to Finals
2	Vasco da Gama	22	14	3	5	50	20	+30	31	
3	Fluminense	22	14	3	5	29	16	+13	31	
4	Botafogo	22	11	5	6	24	15	+9	27	
5	Bangu	22	9	6	7	25	16	+9	24	
6	Campo Grande	22	7	9	6	15	22	−7	23	
7	América	22	6	8	8	20	26	−6	20	
8	Mesquita	22	5	7	10	13	25	−12	17	
9	Goytacaz	22	4	8	10	18	25	−7	16	
10	Americano	22	3	10	9	12	27	−15	16	
11	Olaria	22	4	6	12	10	26	−16	14	
12	Portuguesa	22	2	8	12	9	33	−24	12	

Updated to match(es) played on July 27, 1986. Source: RSSSF.com
Rules for classification: 1) points; 2) wins; 3) goal difference; 4) number of goals scored.

=== Finals ===
Team 1	Series	Team 2	Game 1	Game 2	Game 3
Flamengo	4–2	Vasco da Gama	0–0	0–0	2–0
