= 1933 Campeonato Carioca =

In the 1933 season of the Campeonato Carioca, two championships were disputed, each by a different league.

== AMEA Championship ==
Campeonato Carioca
- Season: 1933
- Champions: Botafogo
- Matches played: 99
- Goals scored: 449 (4.54 per match)
- Top goalscorer: Nilo (Botafogo) – 19 goals
- Biggest home win: Flamengo 16-2 River (May 14, 1933)
- Biggest away win: Portuguesa 2-9 Botafogo (May 14, 1933)
- Highest scoring: Flamengo 16-2 River (May 14, 1933)

After the 1932 championship, talks began among the seven main clubs of the AMEA league to discuss whether to adopt professionalism, like APEA in São Paulo had done before, or not. However, after the league's statue was first drafted, only América, Bangu and Fluminense accepted it, although they were joined by Vasco da Gama, which reversed its previous position on that matter. The four teams were consequently expelled from AMEA, which was resolved to remain amateur. Later on, Bonsucesso joined them, and CBD took a stance against professionalism, prompting LCF and APEA to break with CBD and form a rival confederation called the FBF (Federação Brasileira de Football). to bolster its importance, LCF and APEA agreed on the creation of an interstate tournament between the five LCF teams and seven APEA teams, the Rio-São Paulo Tournament. Meanwhile, other minor teams also joined LCF, and were organized into an affiliated league called the Subliga Carioca de Football (Carioca Football Subleague).

Meanwhile, AMEA promoted a number of teams from the second level to organize a thirteen-team championship and began their championship before LCF, on April 30, 1933. However, only four weeks into the championship, Carioca, Flamengo and São Cristóvão left AMEA and tried to join LCF. Flamengo, runners-up of the previous year's championship, were accepted, even though they couldn't join the Rio-São Paulo tournament, which was already underway, but Carioca and São Cristóvão had to play in the Subliga instead.

The edition of the Campeonato Carioca organized by AMEA ended on December 3, 1933. Botafogo won the championship for the 6th time. no teams were relegated.

=== Participating teams ===
Club	Home location	Previous season
Andarahy	Andaraí, Rio de Janeiro	3rd
Botafogo	Botafogo, Rio de Janeiro	1st
Brasil	Urca, Rio de Janeiro	12th
Carioca	Jardim Botânico, Rio de Janeiro	10th
Cocotá	Ilha do Governador, Rio de Janeiro	6th (Second level)
Confiança	Andaraí, Rio de Janeiro	11th (Second level)
Engenho de Dentro	Engenho de Dentro, Rio de Janeiro	1st (Second level)
Flamengo	Flamengo, Rio de Janeiro	2nd
Mavílis	Caju, Rio de Janeiro	7th (Second level)
Olaria	Olaria, Rio de Janeiro	11th
Portuguesa	Ilha do Governador, Rio de Janeiro	10th (Second level)
River	Piedade, Rio de Janeiro	9th (Second level)
São Cristóvão	São Cristóvão, Rio de Janeiro	5th

=== System ===
The tournament would be disputed in a double round-robin format, with the team with the most points winning the title.

=== Championship ===
Pos	Team	Pld	W	D	L	GF	GA	GD	Pts	Qualification or relegation
1	Botafogo	18	12	4	2	51	27	+24	28	Champions
2	Olaria	19	10	4	5	56	34	+22	24	
3	Andarahy	19	11	2	6	58	41	+17	24	
4	Engenho de Dentro	19	8	5	6	40	34	+6	21	
5	Confiança	18	6	7	5	26	30	−4	19	
6	Cocotá	19	6	5	8	29	45	−16	17	
7	Mavílis	18	4	8	6	36	40	−4	16	
8	Portuguesa	18	4	6	8	34	44	−10	14	
9	Brasil	19	4	3	12	33	47	−14	11	
10	River	21	5	1	15	33	75	−42	11	
11	São Cristóvão	4	3	0	1	16	9	+7	6	Withdrew
12	Flamengo	3	2	1	0	21	6	+15	5	Withdrew
13	Carioca	3	1	0	2	8	9	−1	2	Withdrew

Updated to match(es) played on December 3, 1933. Source: RSSSF.com
Rules for classification: 1) points; 2) goal difference; 3) wins; 4) number of goals scored.

== LCF Championship ==
Campeonato Carioca
- Season: 1933
- Champions: Bangu
- Matches played: 30
- Goals scored: 117 (3.9 per match)
- Top goalscorer: Tião (Bangu) – 13 goals
- Biggest home win: Bangu 4-0 Fluminense (November 12, 1933); Bangu 7-3 América (November 15, 1933)
- Biggest away win: Bomsuccesso 0-5 Bangu (September 24, 1933)
- Highest scoring: Bangu 7-3 América (November 15, 1933)

The edition of the Campeonato Carioca organized by LCF (Liga Carioca de Football, or Carioca Football League) kicked off on May 7, 1933, and ended on November 15, 1933. Six teams participated. Bangu won the championship for the 1st time. no teams were relegated.

=== Participating teams ===
Club	Home location	Previous season
América	Tijuca, Rio de Janeiro	9th
Bangu	Bangu, Rio de Janeiro	4th
Bomsuccesso	Bonsucesso, Rio de Janeiro	8th
Fluminense	Laranjeiras, Rio de Janeiro	7th
Flamengo	Flamengo, Rio de Janeiro	2nd
Vasco da Gama	São Cristóvão, Rio de Janeiro	6th

=== System ===
The tournament would be disputed in a double round-robin format, with the team with the most points winning the title.

=== Championship ===
Pos	Team	Pld	W	D	L	GF	GA	GD	Pts	Qualification or relegation
1	Bangu	10	7	2	1	35	16	+19	16	Champions
2	Fluminense	10	6	0	4	17	17	0	12	
3	Vasco da Gama	10	4	2	4	18	13	+5	10	
4	Bomsuccesso	10	4	2	4	16	23	−7	10	
5	América	10	3	1	6	18	28	−10	7	
6	Flamengo	10	2	1	7	13	20	−7	5	

Updated to match(es) played on November 15, 1933. Source: RSSSF.com
Rules for classification: 1) points; 2) goal difference; 3) wins; 4) number of goals scored.
