= 1996 Campeonato Carioca =

Campeonato Carioca
- Season: 1996
- Champions: Flamengo
- Copa do Brasil: Flamengo; Fluminense; Botafogo; Vasco da Gama
- Matches played: 132
- Goals scored: 344 (2.61 per match)
- Top goalscorer: Romário (Flamengo) - 26 goals
- Biggest home win: Botafogo 7-1 Barreira (March 31, 1996)
- Biggest away win: América 0-7 Botafogo (May 11, 1996)
- Highest scoring: Olaria 5-4 Itaperuna (June 23, 1996)

The 1996 edition of the Campeonato Carioca kicked off on March 10, 1996, and ended on June 30, 1996. It is the official tournament organized by FFERJ (Federação de Futebol do Estado do Rio de Janeiro, or Rio de Janeiro State Football Federation. Only clubs based in the Rio de Janeiro State are allowed to play. Twelve teams contested this edition. Flamengo won the title for the 24th time. no teams were relegated.

== System ==
The tournament would be divided in three stages:

- Taça Guanabara: The twelve teams all played in single round-robin format against each other.
- Taça Rio: The twelve teams all played in single round-robin format against each other.
- Finals: They were to be played in two matches between the champions of the Taças Guanabara and Rio. in case the same team won both stages, they would automatically win the title, without need for final matches.

== Championship ==
=== Taça Cidade Maravilhosa ===
As a commemoration of the 90th anniversary of the first championship, a separate championship involving only the teams from the city of Rio de Janeiro was played.

Pos	Team	Pld	W	D	L	GF	GA	GD	Pts	Qualification or relegation
1	Botafogo	7	6	1	0	21	6	+15	19	Champions
2	Madureira	7	4	2	1	7	6	+1	14	
3	Flamengo	7	3	4	0	10	6	+4	13	
4	Vasco da Gama	7	3	2	2	16	11	+5	11	
5	Fluminense	7	2	2	3	12	12	0	8	
6	Bangu	7	2	1	4	7	14	−7	7	
7	América	7	0	2	5	6	14	−8	2	
8	Olaria	7	0	2	5	8	18	−10	2	

Updated to match(es) played on March 8, 1996. Source: RSSSF.com
Rules for classification: 1) points; 2) wins; 3) goal difference; 4) number of goals scored.

=== Taça Guanabara ===
Pos	Team	Pld	W	D	L	GF	GA	GD	Pts	Qualification or relegation
1	Flamengo	11	10	1	0	30	8	+22	31	Champions
2	Vasco da Gama	11	9	0	2	25	13	+12	27	
3	Fluminense	11	6	2	3	20	15	+5	20	
4	Botafogo	11	5	4	2	22	16	+6	19	
5	Itaperuna	11	4	4	3	12	8	+4	16	
6	Americano	11	4	2	5	7	9	−2	14	
7	América	11	3	4	4	12	13	−1	13	
8	Bangu	11	3	3	5	16	15	+1	12	
9	Volta Redonda	11	2	4	5	6	12	−6	10	
10	Barreira	11	2	2	7	7	22	−15	8	
11	Madureira	11	2	1	8	8	19	−11	7	
12	Olaria	11	1	3	7	13	28	−15	6	

Updated to match(es) played on May 5, 1996. Source: RSSSF.com
Rules for classification: 1) points; 2) wins; 3) goal difference; 4) number of goals scored.

=== Taça Rio ===
Pos	Team	Pld	W	D	L	GF	GA	GD	Pts	Qualification or relegation
1	Flamengo	11	8	3	0	27	7	+20	27	Champions
2	Vasco da Gama	11	7	3	1	17	2	+15	24	
3	Botafogo	11	6	5	0	25	8	+17	23	
4	Fluminense	11	5	2	4	17	11	+6	17	
5	Olaria	11	5	1	5	17	21	−4	16	
6	Madureira	11	3	4	4	9	16	−7	13	
7	Volta Redonda	11	3	2	6	8	11	−3	11	
8	Americano	11	2	4	5	7	17	−10	10	
9	Bangu	11	1	7	3	6	13	−7	10	
10	Itaperuna	11	2	3	6	13	18	−5	9	
11	Barreira	11	2	3	6	11	21	−10	9	
12	América	11	2	3	6	9	21	−12	9	

Updated to match(es) played on June 30, 1996. Source: RSSSF.com
Rules for classification: 1) points; 2) wins; 3) goal difference; 4) number of goals scored.

=== Aggregate table ===
The regulation stipulated that the two bottom teams in the aggregate table would dispute a playoff against the top two teams of the Second Level.

Pos	Team	Pld	W	D	L	GF	GA	GD	Pts	Qualification or relegation
1	Flamengo	22	18	4	0	57	15	+42	58	Copa do Brasil
2	Vasco da Gama	22	16	3	3	42	15	+27	51	Copa do Brasil
3	Botafogo	22	11	9	2	47	24	+23	42	Copa do Brasil
4	Fluminense	22	11	4	7	37	26	+11	37	Copa do Brasil
5	Itaperuna	22	6	7	9	25	26	−1	25	
6	Americano	22	6	6	10	14	26	−12	24	
7	Olaria	22	6	4	12	30	49	−19	22	
8	América	22	5	7	10	18	34	−16	22	
9	Bangu	22	4	10	8	22	28	−6	22	
10	Volta Redonda	22	5	6	11	14	23	−9	21	
11	Madureira	22	5	5	12	17	35	−18	20	Playouts
12	Barreira	22	4	5	13	18	43	−25	17	Playouts

Updated to match(es) played on June 30, 1996. Source: RSSSF.com
Rules for classification: 1) points; 2) wins; 3) goal difference; 4) number of goals scored.

=== Relegation playouts ===
Team 1	Score	Team 2
Madureira	1–0	Barra Mansa
Barreira	1–0	Portuguesa
