= Canto do Rio Foot-Ball Club =

Canto do Rio
- Full name: Canto do Rio Foot-Ball Club
- Founded: November 14, 1913
- Ground: Estádio Caio Martins
- Capacity: 12,000
- League: Campeonato Carioca (lower levels)
Home colours	Away colours

Canto do Rio Foot-Ball Club, commonly known as Canto do Rio, is a sports and social club from Niterói in the state of Rio de Janeiro, Brazil. It is best known for being a secondary force in Rio de Janeiro's football competitions.

== History ==
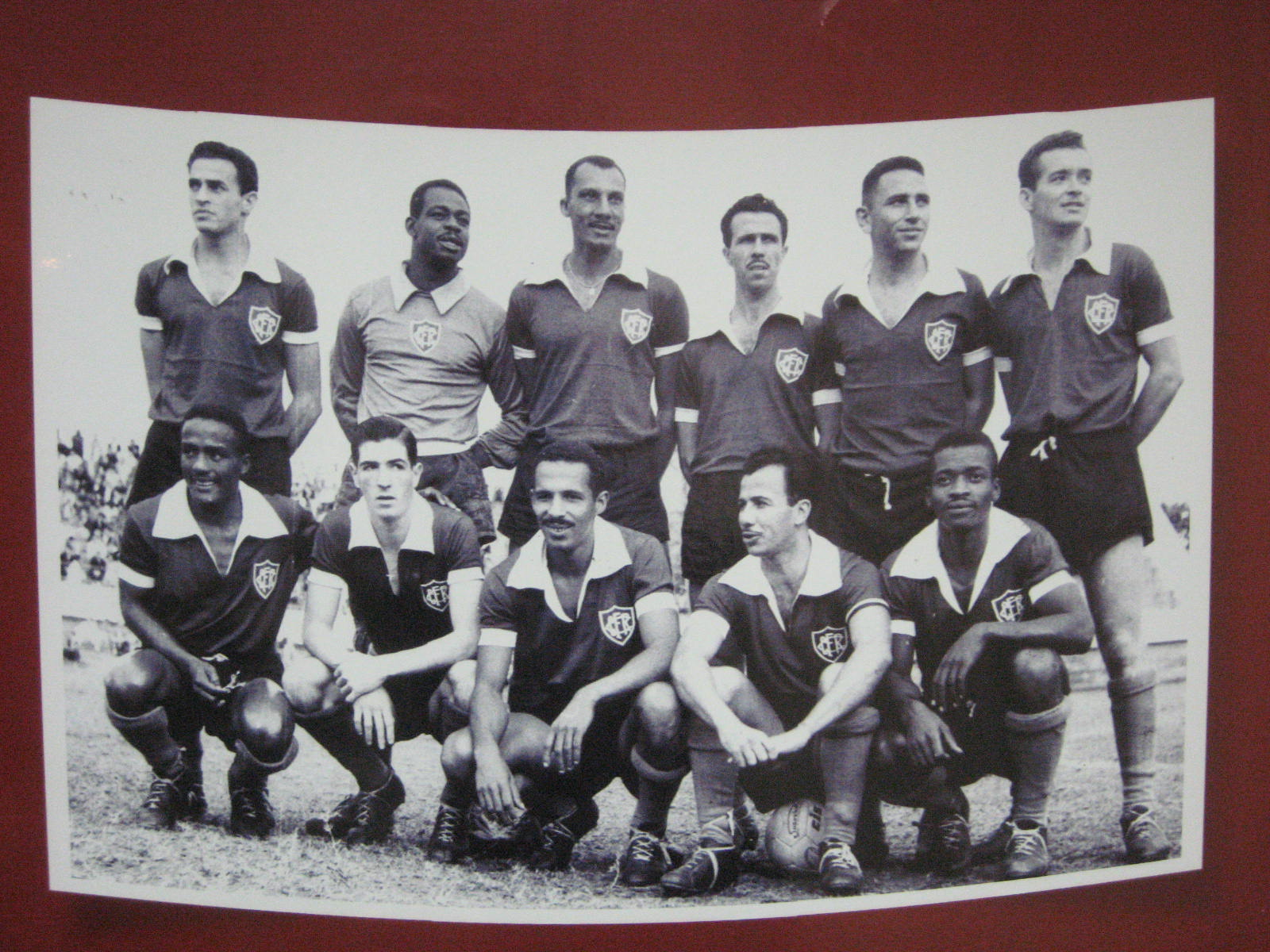
Footballing heyday Players of Canto do Rio in the 1950s

Canto do Rio played after its professionalisation from 1940 to 1964 as the only club from the state of Rio de Janeiro, of which Niterói was the capital, in the first division of the city of Rio de Janeiro, as the then capital of Brazil was in the then Federal District, and after 1960 in the then state of Guanabara. There, Canto do Rio generally finished in the lower regions of the table. In 1944 Canto do Rio peaked, finishing sixth, and in that season also had, with Geraldino who scored 19 goals, the top scorer of the league. Since 1964 the club has played occasionally in the second division of the Rio de Janeiro competition, but generally was to be found in the third level.

Between 1933 and 1968 Canto do Rio won five times the championship of the city of Niterói, a competition that was held between 1913 and 1974. In the 1940s the club several times took part in the Municipal Tournament of the city of Rio de Janeiro, held between 1938 and 1951, where it could achieve a notable third place in 1944.

From 1940 to 1945 Ely do Amparo - later part of the legendary Expresso da Vitória of CR Vasco da Gama and the Brazilian team between 1949 and 1953 - played with Canto do Rio and captained the team for some time. Danilo Alvim in 1943, later also part of Vasco da Gama's famous side and the Brazil of the era, and Caetano da Silva "Veludo" in 1956, nine times goalkeeper for Brazil, are further famous player who had also short spells with the club. In the late 1950s Gérson de Oliveira Nunes, World Cup winner with Brazil in 1970 played in the youth teams of the club.

These days the club occupies a block of about 12 000 m^{2}, circa 130 000 square feet, close to the centre of Niterói containing sports fields, pools, gyms, saunas and other buildings for the sports activities of its members and facilities to host functions of all kinds.

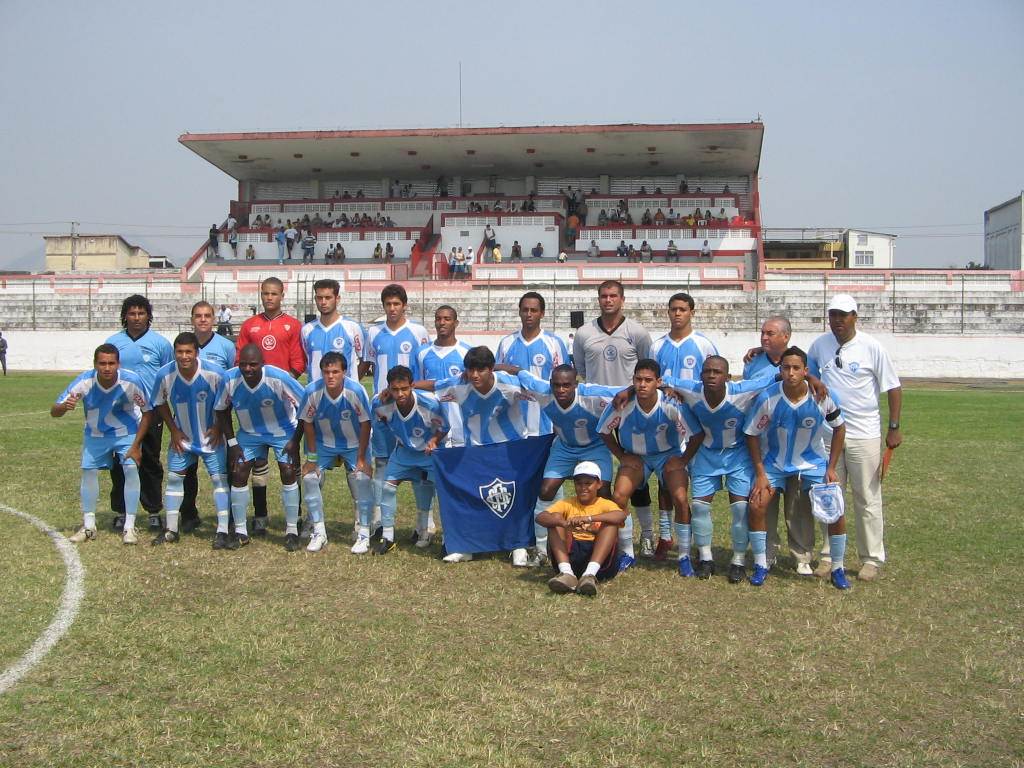
Team photo from the 2007 season

== Honours ==
=== State ===
- Torneio Início
  - Winners (1): 1953
- Torneio Início do Campeonato Fluminense
  - Winners (2): 1918, 1926

=== City ===
- Campeonato Niteroiense de Futebol
  - Winners (6): 1933, 1934, 1945, 1948, 1954, 1968
