= 1914 Campeonato Carioca =

Campeonato Carioca
- Season: 1914
- Dates: 3 May – 22 November
- Teams: 7
- Champions: Flamengo
- Relegated: Paissandu
- Matches: 42
- Goals: 166 (3.95 per match)
- Top goalscorer: Bartholomeu "Barthô" (Fluminense) (10)

The 1914 Campeonato Carioca was the ninth edition of the Rio de Janeiro state football championship. The competition was organized by the Liga Metropolitana de Sports Athleticos (LMSA). Flamengo finished the tournament with the most points and won their first state championship.

== Participating teams ==
Club	Home location
América	Tijuca, Rio de Janeiro
Botafogo	Botafogo, Rio de Janeiro
Flamengo	Flamengo, Rio de Janeiro
Fluminense	Laranjeiras, Rio de Janeiro
Paissandu	Flamengo, Rio de Janeiro
Rio Cricket	Praia Grande, Niterói
São Cristóvão	São Cristóvão, Rio de Janeiro

== League table ==
Pos	Team	Pld	W	D	L	GF	GA	GD	Pts	Qualification
1	Flamengo	12	8	3	1	24	15	+9	19	Champion
2	América	12	8	1	3	30	10	+20	17	
3	Botafogo	12	7	3	2	24	12	+12	17	
4	Fluminense	12	7	2	3	36	17	+19	16	
5	Rio Cricket	12	3	0	9	25	35	−10	6	
6	São Cristóvão	12	1	3	8	15	41	−26	5	
7	Paissandu	12	1	2	9	12	36	−24	4	Relegation playoff

Updated to match(es) played on 22 November 1914. Source: RSSF

== Relegation playoff ==
A relegation playoff match was scheduled between the bottom-placed team of the Campeonato Carioca (Paissandu) and the top-placed team of the Carioca 2nd division (Bangu). Paissandu refused to play the match, and Bangu was promoted to the 1915 Campeonato Carioca 1st division.
