= 1915 Campeonato Carioca =

Campeonato Carioca
- Season: 1915
- Champions: Flamengo
- Relegated: Rio Cricket
- Matches: 44
- Goals: 213 (4.84 per match)
- Top goalscorer: Harry Welfare (Fluminense) – 19 goals
- Biggest home win: Fluminense 9-1 São Cristóvão (August 1, 1915)
- Biggest away win: Rio Cricket 0-8 América (May 30, 1915)
- Highest scoring: Bangu 8-2 São Cristóvão (July 4, 1915); Fluminense 9-1 São Cristóvão (August 1, 1915)

The 1915 Campeonato Carioca, the tenth edition of that championship, kicked off on May 2, 1915, and ended on October 31, 1915. It was organized by LMSA (Liga Metropolitana de Sports Athleticos, or Metropolitan Athletic Sports League). Seven teams participated. Flamengo won the title for the 2nd time. Rio Cricket was relegated.

== Participating teams ==
Club	Home location	Previous season
América	Tijuca, Rio de Janeiro	2nd
Bangu	Bangu, Rio de Janeiro	1st (Second level)
Botafogo	Botafogo, Rio de Janeiro	3rd
Flamengo	Flamengo, Rio de Janeiro	1st
Fluminense	Laranjeiras, Rio de Janeiro	4th
Rio Cricket	Praia Grande, Niterói	5th
São Cristóvão	São Cristóvão, Rio de Janeiro	6th

== System ==
The tournament would be disputed in a double round-robin format, with the team with the most points winning the title. The team with the fewest points would dispute a playoff against the champions of the second level.

== Championship ==
Pos	Team	Pld	W	D	L	GF	GA	GD	Pts	Qualification or relegation
1	Flamengo	12	8	4	0	35	11	+24	20	Champions
2	Fluminense	12	8	2	2	42	21	+21	18	
3	América	12	8	1	3	44	15	+29	17	
4	Botafogo	12	5	2	5	24	24	0	12	
5	São Cristóvão	12	3	1	8	18	36	−18	7	
6	Bangu	12	3	0	9	23	45	−22	6	
7	Rio Cricket	12	2	0	10	13	47	−34	4	Relegation playoffs

Updated to match(es) played on October 31, 1915. Source: RSSSF.com
Rules for classification: 1) points; 2) goal difference; 3) wins; 4) number of goals scored.

=== Relegation playoffs ===
The last-placed team, Rio Cricket would dispute a playoff against Andarahy, champions of the Second Level. Rio Cricket lost the playoff, and with many of its players, who were mostly English, leaving to fight on World War I, Rio Cricket left the league in 1917.

Team 1	Series	Team 2	Game 1	Game 2	Game 3
Andarahy	4–2	Rio Cricket	2–2	2–2	4-2
