= Osmar Santos =

Brazilian painter and journalist

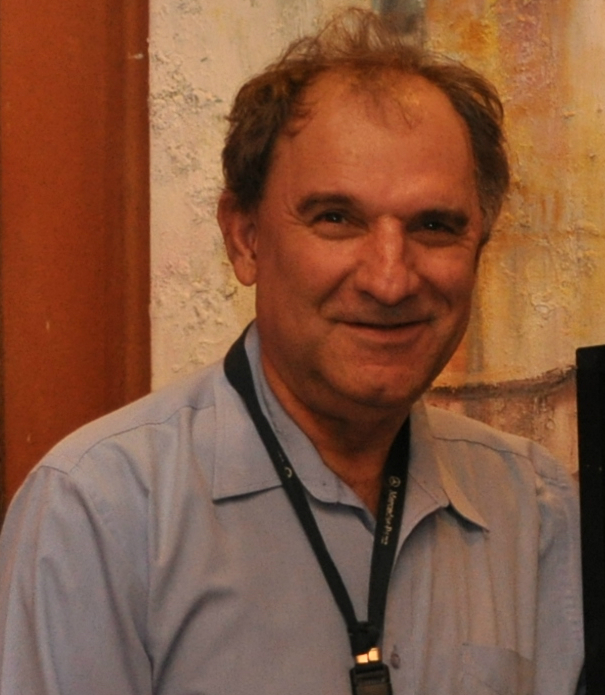
- Born: Osmar Aparecido Santos; July 28, 1949 (age 75); Osvaldo Cruz, São Paulo, Brazil
- Occupation(s): journalist, painter

Osmar Santos (born July 28, 1949) is a former painter and journalist from Brazil. He was a very successful radio and television sports commentator in the 1980s and early 1990s, known for his outstanding verbal fluency (estimated at over one hundred words per minute) and for his numerous catchphrases, which still punctuate Brazilian football culture. Throughout his career, Osmar Santos worked alongside major sportscasters and media personalities, such as Galvão Bueno, Fausto Silva and João Saldanha. He also worked as TV host in a number of shows. Osmar Santos publicly supported Diretas Já, a political movement for direct suffrage in Brazilian presidential politics.

In 1994, Osmar Santos suffered a serious car accident traveling from Marília to Lins, when he was hit by a drunk truck driver. He underwent extensive brain damage, having acquired right hemiplegia and Expressive aphasia, which rendered him unable to utter more than a limited selection of words. Osmar Santos then took up painting, and his art brut works are highly valued by collectors.

He is commemorated by Troféu Osmar Santos, a football award given out annually. Two of his brothers and a cousin work as sportscasters.
