= João Saldanha =

Brazilian journalist and football manager (1917–1990)

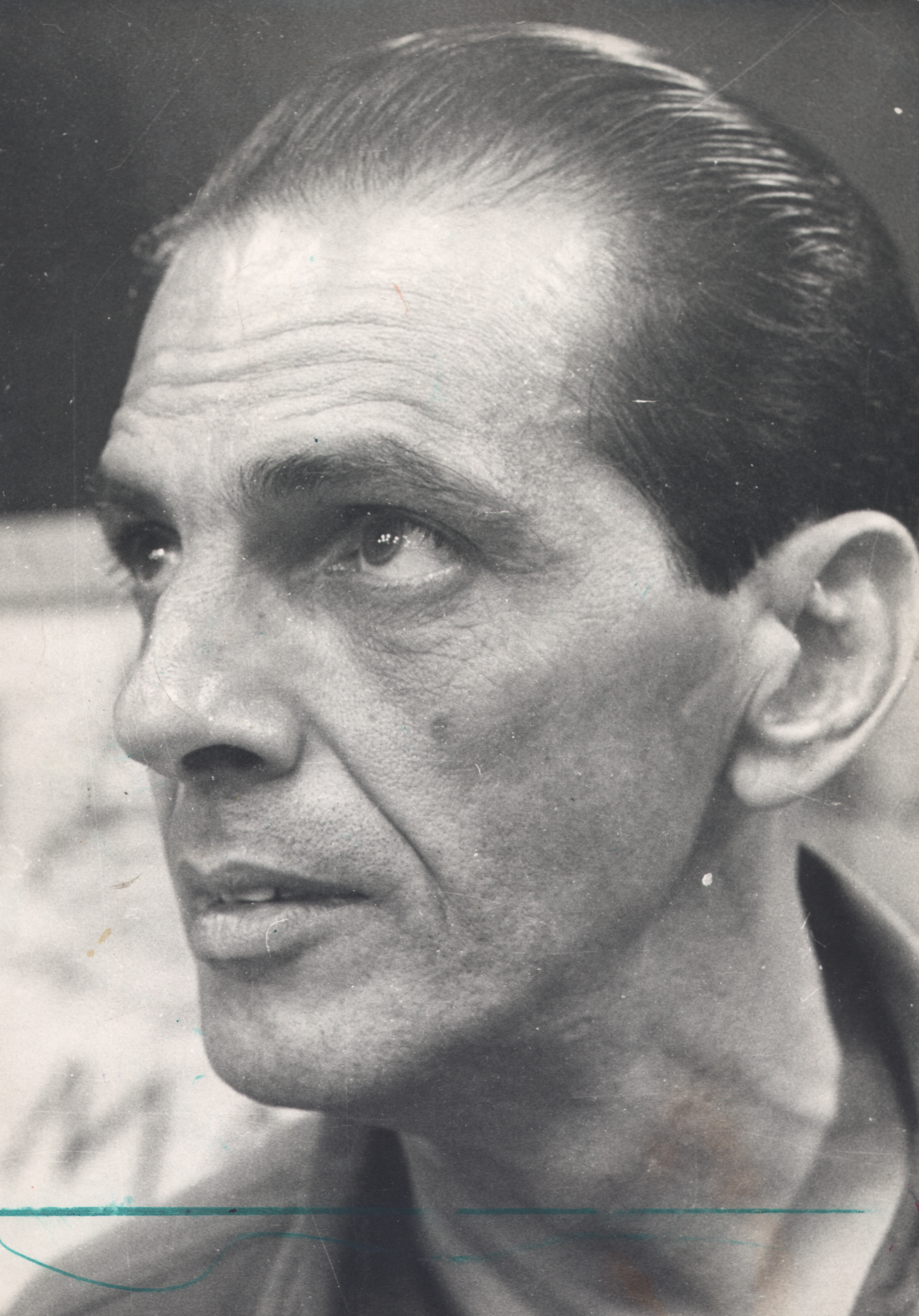
- Saldanha in 1973

Personal information
- Full name: João Alves Jobin Saldanha
- Date of birth: 3 July 1917
- Place of birth: Alegrete, Brazil
- Date of death: 12 July 1990 (aged 73)
- Place of death: Rome, Italy

Senior career*
Years	Team	Apps	(Gls)
1937-1945	Botafogo		

Managerial career
- 1957–1959: Botafogo
- 1969–1970: Brazil
- * Club domestic league appearances and goals

João Alves Jobin Saldanha (3 July 1917 – 12 July 1990) was a Brazilian journalist and football manager. He coached the Brazil national football team during the South American Qualifying to the 1970 FIFA World Cup. Nicknamed João Sem Medo (Fearless João) by Nelson Rodrigues, Saldanha played for Botafogo. He then started a career in journalism and became one of Brazil's most prolific sports columnists. He often criticised players, managers and teams, and was a member of then-illegal Brazilian Communist Party (Partido Comunista Brasileiro – PCB).

== Biography and career ==
João Saldanha, 1969. National Archives of Brazil.

In 1957, Botafogo appointed him as their coach, despite his lack of managerial experience. The club won the Rio state championship that season, but Saldanha resigned from the club in 1959. In 1969, he was invited to take charge of the national team, and led them to a perfect 6-0 record. It is alleged that football federation president João Havelange appointed him in the hope that journalists would be less critical of the national team if one of their own was in charge.

Saldanha was publicly criticised by Dorival Yustrich, coach of Flamengo. Saldanha responded by confronting him while brandishing a revolver. Saldanha was said to have fallen out of favour because of his unwillingness to select players who were personal favourites of President Emílio Garrastazu Médici, in particular striker Dario (Brazil was then a military dictatorship). It is reported that Saldanha, after being told that President Médici would be pleased to see Dario in the team, answered, "well, I also have some suggestions to give in the President's ministry choices". The last straw came when the assistant manager resigned, saying that Saldanha was impossible to work with.

Afterwards, Saldanha went back to his journalistic career, even covering the 1970 and 1974 World Cups for TV Globo and the 1986 and 1990 World Cups for TV Manchete. The day after commenting on the second round match between Italy and Argentina, Saldanha was admitted into the Sant'Eugenio Hospital, in Rome, with respiratory problems (after smoking heavily for most of his life since his youth), and died eight days later.

== Honours ==
Botafogo

- Campeonato Carioca: 1957

== Legacy ==
Starting from 2004, the winners of the second turn of the Campeonato Brasileiro Série A, are awarded with the "Troféu João Saldanha", given by the Brazilian newspaper Lance!.
