= Júlio Fidelis =

Brazilian footballer (born 2006)

Personal information
- Full name: Júlio César Lima Fidelis
- Date of birth: 6 November 2006 (age 20)
- Place of birth: Macaé, Brazil
- Position: Right-back

Team information
- Current team: Fluminense
- Number: 46

Youth career
- 2015–: Fluminense

Senior career*
Years	Team	Apps	(Gls)
2025–	Fluminense	5	(0)
- * Club domestic league appearances and goals as of 6 April 2026

Júlio César Lima Fidelis (born 6 November 2006) is a Brazilian professional footballer who plays as a right-back for Fluminense.

== Career ==
Born in Macaé, Rio de Janeiro, Fidelis joined Fluminense's youth sides in 2015, after a trial period. On 25 November 2022, he signed his first professional contract with the club, agreeing to a deal until 2027.

On 10 April 2025, Fidelis renewed his link with Flu until December 2028. He made his first team debut thirteen days later, starting in a 1–1 away draw against Unión Española, for the year's Copa Sudamericana.

Fidelis made his Série A debut on 9 August 2025, playing the full 90 minutes and providing an assist to Germán Cano's goal in a 3–3 away draw against Bahia.

== Career statistics ==
As of 25 August 2025

Club	Season	League			State league		National cup		Continental		Other		Total	
Club	Season	Division	Apps	Goals	Apps	Goals	Apps	Goals	Apps	Goals	Apps	Goals	Apps	Goals
Fluminense	2025	Série A	1	0	0	0	0	0	1 (Note: Appearance(s) in Copa Sudamericana)	0	—		2	0
Career total			1	0	0	0	0	0	1	0	0	0	2	0
