= Troféu João Saldanha =

Award by Lance!, Brazilian newspaper

Troféu João Saldanha is an award given by the Brazilian newspaper Lance! to the winner of the second half of the Campeonato Brasileiro Série A. The trophy honors João Saldanha, who was a journalist and head coach, deceased on July 12, 1990, during that year's World Cup. The award was created in 2004.

== Winners ==
Year	Winner
2004	Santos
2005	Internacional
2006	São Paulo
2007	São Paulo
2008	São Paulo
2009	Cruzeiro
2010	Grêmio
2011	Fluminense
2012	São Paulo
2013	Cruzeiro
2014	Corinthians
2015	Corinthians
2016	Palmeiras
2017	Chapecoense
2018	Palmeiras
2019	Flamengo
2020	Flamengo
2021	Atlético Mineiro
2022	Internacional
2023	Atlético Mineiro
2024	Botafogo
2025	Flamengo

== Titles by team ==
Club	Titles
(São Paulo (state)) São Paulo	4 (2006, 2007, 2008, 2012)
(Rio de Janeiro (state)) Flamengo	3 (2019, 2020, 2025)
(Minas Gerais) Atlético Mineiro	2 (2021, 2023)
(São Paulo (state)) Corinthians	2 (2014, 2015)
(Minas Gerais) Cruzeiro	2 (2009, 2013)
(São Paulo (state)) Palmeiras	2 (2016, 2018)
(Rio Grande do Sul) Internacional	2 (2005, 2022)
(Rio de Janeiro (state)) Botafogo	1 (2024)
(Santa Catarina (state)) Chapecoense	1 (2017)
(Rio de Janeiro (state)) Fluminense	1 (2011)
(Rio Grande do Sul) Grêmio	1 (2010)
(São Paulo (state)) Santos	1 (2004)

== See also ==
- Troféu Osmar Santos
