= Marcão (footballer, born 1972) =

Brazilian footballer

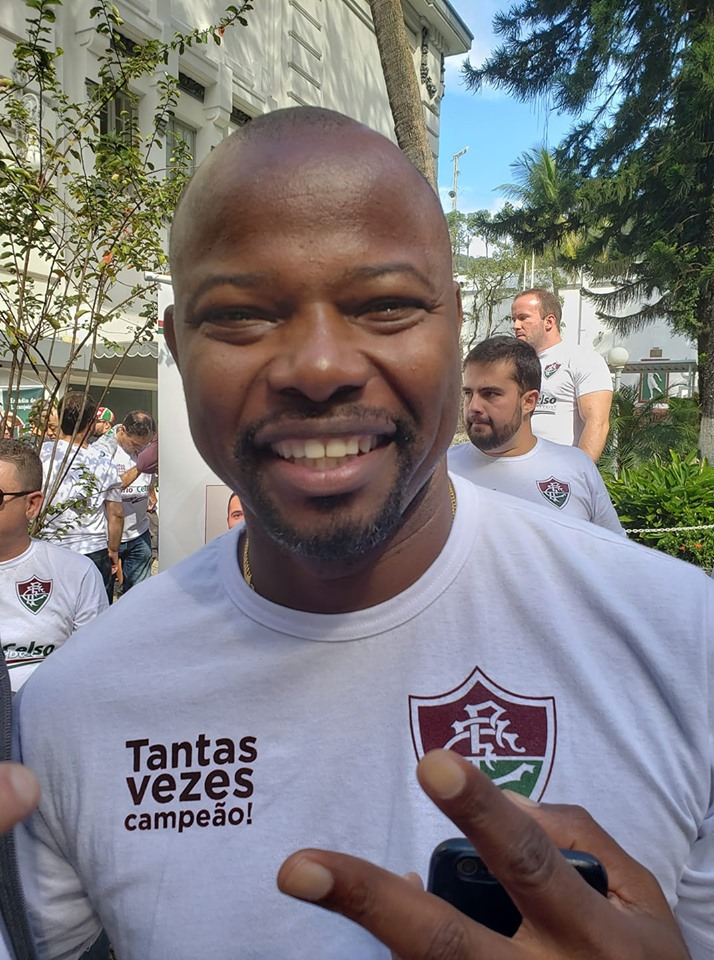

Personal information
- Full name: Marco Aurélio de Oliveira
- Date of birth: 22 July 1972 (age 54)
- Place of birth: Petrópolis, Brazil
- Height: 1.74 m (5 ft 8 1/2 in)
- Position: Defensive midfielder

Team information
- Current team: Fluminense (interim)

Youth career
- Mordomia
- Bangu

Senior career*
Years	Team	Apps	(Gls)
1989–1998	Bangu	204	(15)
1996–1997	→ Criciúma (loan)	17	(0)
1997	→ Vasco da Gama (loan)	0	(0)
1998	→ Bragantino (loan)	20	(0)
1999–2005	Fluminense	125	(2)
2005	Al-Ittihad Doha	0	(0)
2005–2006	Fluminense	62	(7)
2007	Cabofriense	1	(0)
2007	Juventude	22	(4)
2008	Joinville		
2008	Cabofriense		
2008	CFZ do Rio		
2009–2011	Bangu	43	(1)
Total		494	(29)

Managerial career
- 2011–2012: Bangu
- 2012: Bonsucesso
- 2012: Ríver
- 2014–2016: Fluminense (assistant)
- 2016: Fluminense (interim)
- 2019: Fluminense (assistant)
- 2019: Fluminense
- 2020: Fluminense (assistant)
- 2020–2021: Fluminense
- 2021: Fluminense (assistant)
- 2021: Fluminense
- 2022–: Fluminense (assistant)
- 2022: Fluminense (interim)
- 2023: Brazil (assistant)
- 2024: Fluminense (interim)
- 2025: Fluminense (interim)
- 2026–: Fluminense (interim)
- * Club domestic league appearances and goals

Marco Aurélio de Oliveira (born 22 July 1972), commonly known as Marcão, is a Brazilian football coach and former player who played as a defensive midfielder. He is the current interim head coach of Fluminense.

== Playing career ==
Marcão was born in Petrópolis, Rio de Janeiro, and finished his formation with Bangu. He made his first team debut on 5 March 1989, starting in a 0–0 Campeonato Carioca home draw against Americano.

After establishing himself as a starter for the club and subsequently serving loan stints at Criciúma, Vasco da Gama and Bragantino, Marcão joined Fluminense in 1999. At the latter club he was an immediate first-choice, appearing in 333 matches and scoring 12 goals during his first spell.

In August 2005, Marcão moved abroad and joined Al-Ittihad Doha in Qatar. In September, however, he returned to Flu after failing to adapt to the new country, and appeared regularly until the end of 2006, when he was released.

Marcão subsequently represented Cabofriense (two stints), Juventude, Joinville and CFZ do Rio before returning to Bangu in 2009. He retired with the latter club in March 2011, aged 38.

== Coaching career ==
Immediately after retiring Marcão took up coaching, being named head coach of his last club Bangu. He was sacked on 30 January 2012, and was appointed at the helm of Bonsucesso on 14 February.

On 26 April 2012, Marcão was announced as the new head coach of Ríver, but was sacked with a month in charge. On 12 December of the following year, he returned to Fluminense as an assistant coach.

In March 2016, Marcão was named interim head coach of Flu after the dismissal of Eduardo Baptista. He returned to his previous role after the arrival of Levir Culpi, but was again interim after the latter was sacked in November.

Marcão was dismissed from Fluminense on 7 January 2017, and returned to Bangu on 12 July 2018, as a football coordinator. The following 24 June, he returned to his role as an assistant coach, again at Fluminense.

Marcão was interim at Flu for two spells after the departures of Fernando Diniz and Oswaldo de Oliveira. On 4 October 2019, he was definitely appointed head coach until the end of the year.

Marcão returned to the assistant role for the 2020 season, but took over the first team on 7 December of that year after Odair Hellmann left the club. He returned to his assistant role on 26 February 2021, after the appointment of Roger Machado as head coach.

On 21 August 2021, Marcão was again named head coach until the end of the season, after Roger was sacked. He returned to his previous assistant role on 15 December, after Abel Braga was hired by the club.

On 24 June 2024, Marcão was again an interim at Flu, after the dismissal of Fernando Diniz. Back to his assistant role after the arrival of Mano Menezes, he again became an interim on 30 March 2025.

Marcão returned to an assistant role after Renato Gaúcho became the head coach, before again becoming an interim on 13 August 2026, after Luis Zubeldía was dismissed.

== Managerial statistics ==
As of 7 November 2026.

Managerial record by team and tenure
Team	Nat	From	To	Record								Ref
Team	Nat	From	To	G	W	D	L	GF	GA	GD	Win %	Ref
Bangu	(Brazil)	24 March 2011	30 January 2012	22	7	5	10	35	37	−2	31.82	
Bonsucesso	(Brazil)	14 February 2012	24 April 2012	9	1	5	3	11	14	−3	11.11	
Ríver	(Brazil)	26 April 2012	25 May 2012	6	3	1	2	13	5	+8	50.00	
Fluminense (interim)	(Brazil)	27 February 2016	6 March 2016	2	2	0	0	3	1	+2	100.00	
Fluminense (interim)	(Brazil)	9 November 2016	12 December 2016	4	0	2	2	2	4	−2	0.00	
Fluminense	(Brazil)	27 September 2019	11 December 2019	18	7	7	4	16	13	+3	38.89	
Fluminense	(Brazil)	7 December 2020	26 February 2021	14	7	4	3	21	16	+5	50.00	
Fluminense (interim)	(Brazil)	21 August 2021	15 December 2021	25	11	4	10	27	24	+3	44.00	
Fluminense (interim)	(Brazil)	28 April 2022	1 May 2022	1	0	0	1	2	3	−1	0.00	
Fluminense (interim)	(Brazil)	24 June 2024	1 July 2024	2	0	0	2	0	2	−2	0.00	
Fluminense (Note: Interim head coach as a reserve team was used in the first rounds of the Campeonato Carioca)	(Brazil)	12 January 2025	18 January 2025	3	0	2	1	1	2	−1	0.00	
Fluminense (interim)	(Brazil)	30 March 2025	1 April 2025	1	1	0	0	1	0	+1	100.00	
Fluminense (interim)	(Brazil)	14 August 2026	present	17	9	2	6	30	21	+9	52.94	
Total				124	48	32	44	162	142	+20	38.71	—

== Honours ==
=== Player ===
Fluminense

- Campeonato Brasileiro Série C: 1999
- Campeonato Carioca: 2002, 2005
- Taça Rio: 2005
