= Fluminense FC =

Brazilian football club

Fluminense
- Full name: Fluminense Football Club
- Nicknames: Tricolor; Flu; Fluzão (Big Flu); Nense; Pó de Arroz (Rice Powder); Time de Guerreiros (Team of Warriors)
- Founded: 21 July 1902; 124 years ago
- Stadium: Maracanã
- Capacity: 78,838
- President: Mattheus Montenegro
- Head coach: Marcão (interim)
- League: Campeonato Brasileiro Série A Campeonato Carioca
- 2025 2025: Série A, 5th of 20; Carioca, 2nd of 12
- Website: fluminense.com.br
Home colors	Away colors	Third colors

Fluminense Football Club (Brazilian Portuguese: [flumiˈnẽsi futʃiˈbɔw ˈklubi]) is a Brazilian football club based in the neighbourhood of Laranjeiras, in Rio de Janeiro, being the oldest football club in the state since its foundation in 1902. It competes in the Campeonato Brasileiro Série A, the first tier of Brazilian football, and the Campeonato Carioca, the state league of Rio de Janeiro. The word "fluminense" is the gentilic given to people born in the state of Rio de Janeiro.

Fluminense have won numerous titles throughout its history, including the Copa Libertadores in 2023 and the Recopa Sudamericana in 2024. The club has also claimed four Brazilian championships (1970, 1984, 2010, and 2012), the Copa do Brasil in 2007, and 33 Rio de Janeiro state titles. Other notable achievements include winning the 1952 Copa Rio – regarded by the club as a world title – and being the first football club to receive the Olympic Cup from the International Olympic Committee, in 1949, for its pioneering role in sports. In 2023, Fluminense also reached the FIFA Club World Cup final, finishing as runners-up to Manchester City. In 2025, Fluminense reached the 2025 FIFA Club World Cup semi-final, achieving notable victories against Inter Milan and Al-Hilal.

Fluminense's first home kit originally featured a shirt split in half vertically, with one side in white and the other in grey. However, due to the difficulty of sourcing these colours – particularly during a trip to England in 1904, where club members sought new kits – the club opted to change its colours. A vote was held, and Fluminense adopted its now-iconic home kit: a vertically striped shirt in burgundy, white, and green, with thinner white pinstripes flanked by broader burgundy and green stripes, typically paired with white shorts and white socks.

The club holds several long-standing rivalries with other clubs, most notably with Flamengo (Clássico Fla-Flu), Botafogo (Clássico Vovô) and Vasco da Gama (Clássico dos Gigantes). The Fla–Flu in particular is considered one of the greatest football derbies in Brazil and South America, to the point of having the highest attendance in a match between football clubs (nearly 200,000 spectators in the stadium of Maracanã).

Fluminense is recognized as the birthplace of the Brazil national football team, which played its first-ever match at the club's Estádio de Laranjeiras in 1914, during Fluminense's 12th anniversary celebrations. It was there that Brazil scored its first goal and won its first trophy. To this day, Fluminense ranks among the top contributors to the national team, having provided the fifth most players in Brazil's history.

== History ==
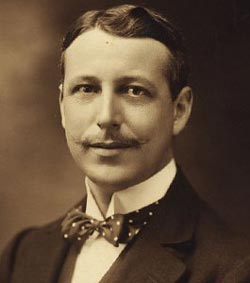
Oscar Cox, founder of Fluminense

=== Pioneering football in Rio ===
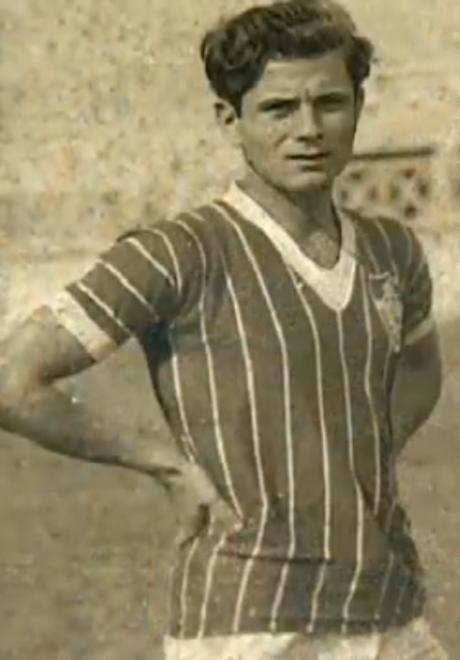
Preguinho, a notable Fluminense player

Fluminense Football Club was founded on 21 July 1902, in the neighbourhood of Laranjeiras, in the city of Rio de Janeiro, by a group of young of Brazilian aristocracy and football enthusiasts led by Oscar Cox, an English citizen born in Brazil, who had come into contact with the sport whilst studying in Lausanne, where he got acquainted with the practice of football. Cox was subsequently elected as the first president. Therefore, it was the first football club to be founded in the city, whose most popular sport at the time was rowing.

The first official match was played against now defunct Rio Football Club, and Fluminense won 8–0. The club's first title came in 1906, when Fluminense won the state championship (Campeonato Carioca).

In 1911, disagreement between Fluminense players led to the formation of Flamengo's football team. The so-called Fla-Flu is considered one of the biggest derbies in the history of Brazilian football. Three years later, in Fluminense's stadium, the Brazil national football team debuted, against touring English club Exeter City. It was also there that they won their debut title, in 1919.

By 1922, Fluminense had 4,000 members, a stadium for 25,000 people, and facilities that impressed clubs in Europe.

=== Construction of the Maracanã ===
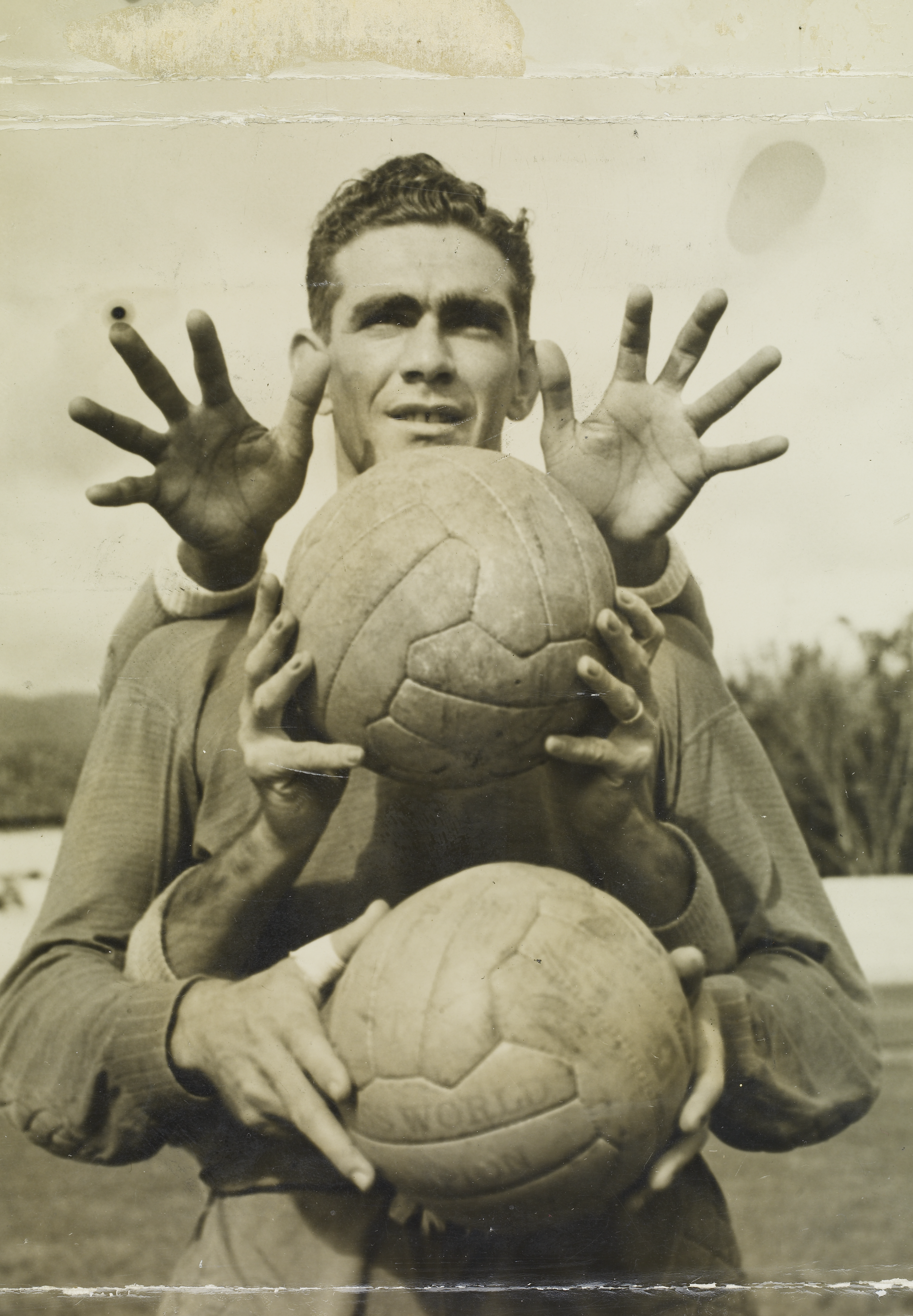
Goalkeeper Carlos Castilho, in 1956

The 1950 World Cup strengthened football in the country, and as a result, the country's biggest teams, which basically only competed in state tournaments, began to measure their strength in tournaments and matches against teams from other states. To hold the competition, the Maracanã was built, the largest stadium in the world at that time, and which became the main stadium for Fluminense's games.

In the context of the World Cup held in the country in 1950, CBD, accompanied by FIFA and IFAB, decided to hold a competition that pitted the champion clubs from the main FIFA-affiliated countries against each other, thus creating the International Champions Club Tournament, better known as Copa Rio. The competition brought together the Champion clubs from countries in South America (Brazil, Paraguay and Uruguay) and Europe (Austria, France, Germany, Italy, Portugal, Switzerland and Yugoslavia), its first edition was in 1951, being won by Palmeiras.

In 1951, Fluminense won the Carioca championship, which meant that the team qualified for the 1952 Copa Rio. The team had great players who represented the Brazilian team, such as Carlos Castilho, Píndaro, Pinheiro, Didi, Orlando Pingo de Ouro and Telê Santana.

In the first phase of the competition, the teams were divided into two groups, the first played their matches at Maracanã, and the second played their matches at Pacaembu, Fluminense was in the first group and faced Grasshopper (Switzerland), Sporting Lisboa (Portugal) and Peñarol (Uruguay), and qualified in first place. In the semi final they beat Austria Wien (Austria), and in the final they defeated Corinthians.

From the 1950s, with the creation of the Rio-São Paulo Tournament, the forerunner of what eventually would become the national championship, Fluminense established itself regionally by winning the tournament title in 1957 and 1960.

=== National achievements ===
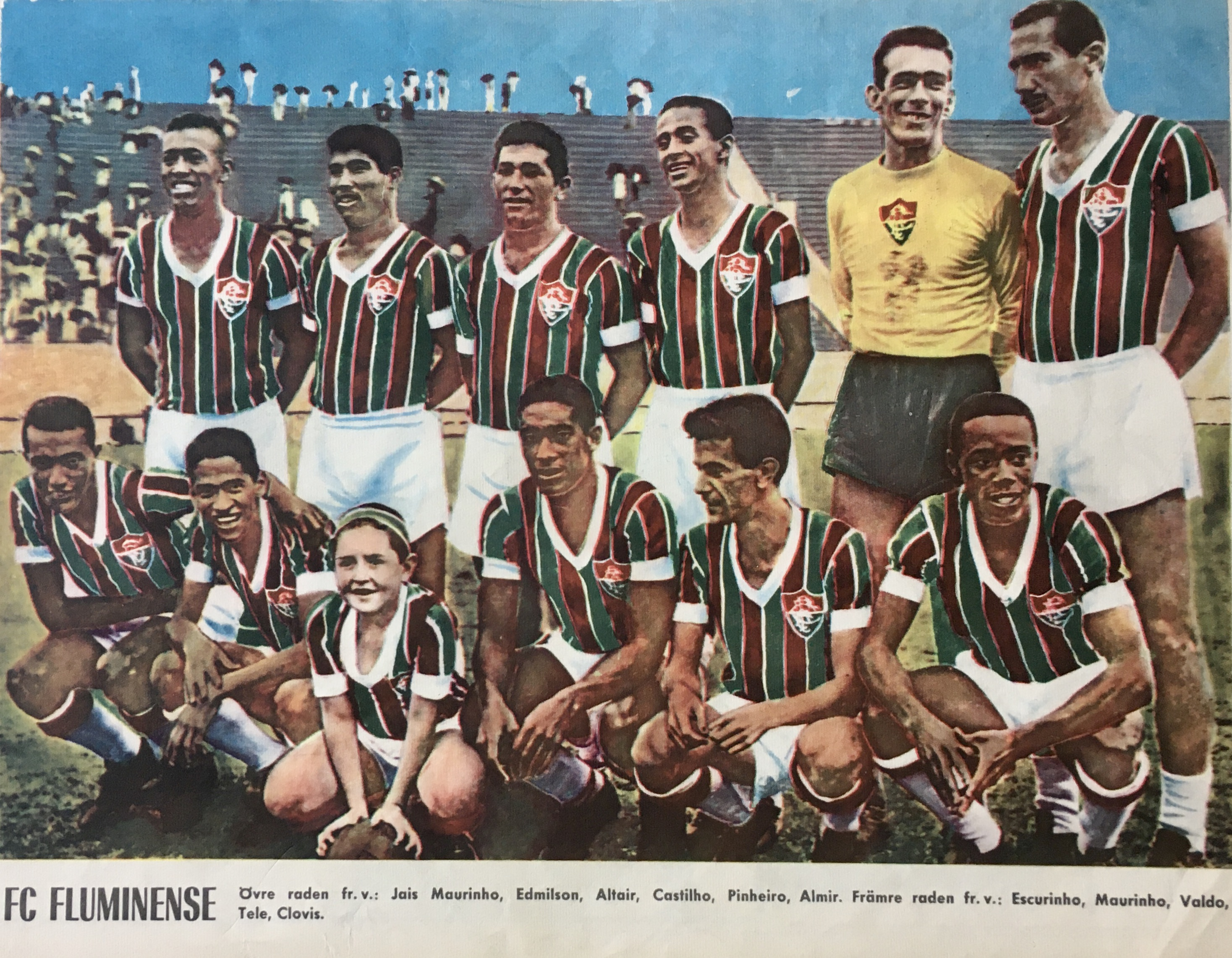
Fluminense team of 1960

From the 1960s onwards, the first national championships were played in Brazil, so that the country could send representatives to the Copa Libertadores. Fluminense's first national title came in 1970; At that time, Brazil had the best players in world football, and they all played for Brazilian clubs. Its squad was among the main candidates of the season in Brazil, Fluminense won the Brazilian Championship overcoming other major opponents of the season in Santos, Palmeiras and Cruzeiro.

In the 1970s, Fluminense signed several famous players such as Carlos Alberto Torres, Dirceu, Gil, Narciso Doval, Pintinho and Roberto Rivellino. This team, called "Tricolor Machine", won the state championship in 1975 and 1976. In the national championship, Fluminense lost in the semifinals to Internacional in 1975 and Corinthians in 1976.

Fluminense became Brazilian champions again in 1984, playing in the final against Rio rivals Vasco da Gama. During the decade, they also won three state championships in a row, in 1983, 1984 and 1985, defeating their main rival Flamengo, in the final of the first two. These titles were won by great players such as Branco, Delei, Edinho, Ricardo Gomes, Romerito and the "Casal Vinte": Assis and Washington.

At the end of the 1980s, Copa do Brasil was created, inspired by cup tournaments played in European countries. Fluminense reached the final of the Copa do Brasil for the first time in 1992, but lost to Internacional in a penalty shootout, in a controversial match in Porto Alegre.

=== Double relegation and rapid return ===
A disastrous campaign led to Fluminense's relegation from Brasileirão Série A in 1996. However, a set of off-field political manoeuvres not performed by the club allowed them to remain in Brazil's top domestic league, only to be relegated the next year. Completely out of control, the club was relegated from Série B to Série C in 1998. In 1999, Fluminense won the Série C championship and were to be promoted to Série B when they were invited to take part in Copa João Havelange, a championship that replaced the traditional Série A in 2000. In 2001, it was decided that all clubs which took part in Copa João Havelange's so-called Blue Group should be kept in Série A.

=== 2000s: Copa do Brasil and first Libertadores final ===
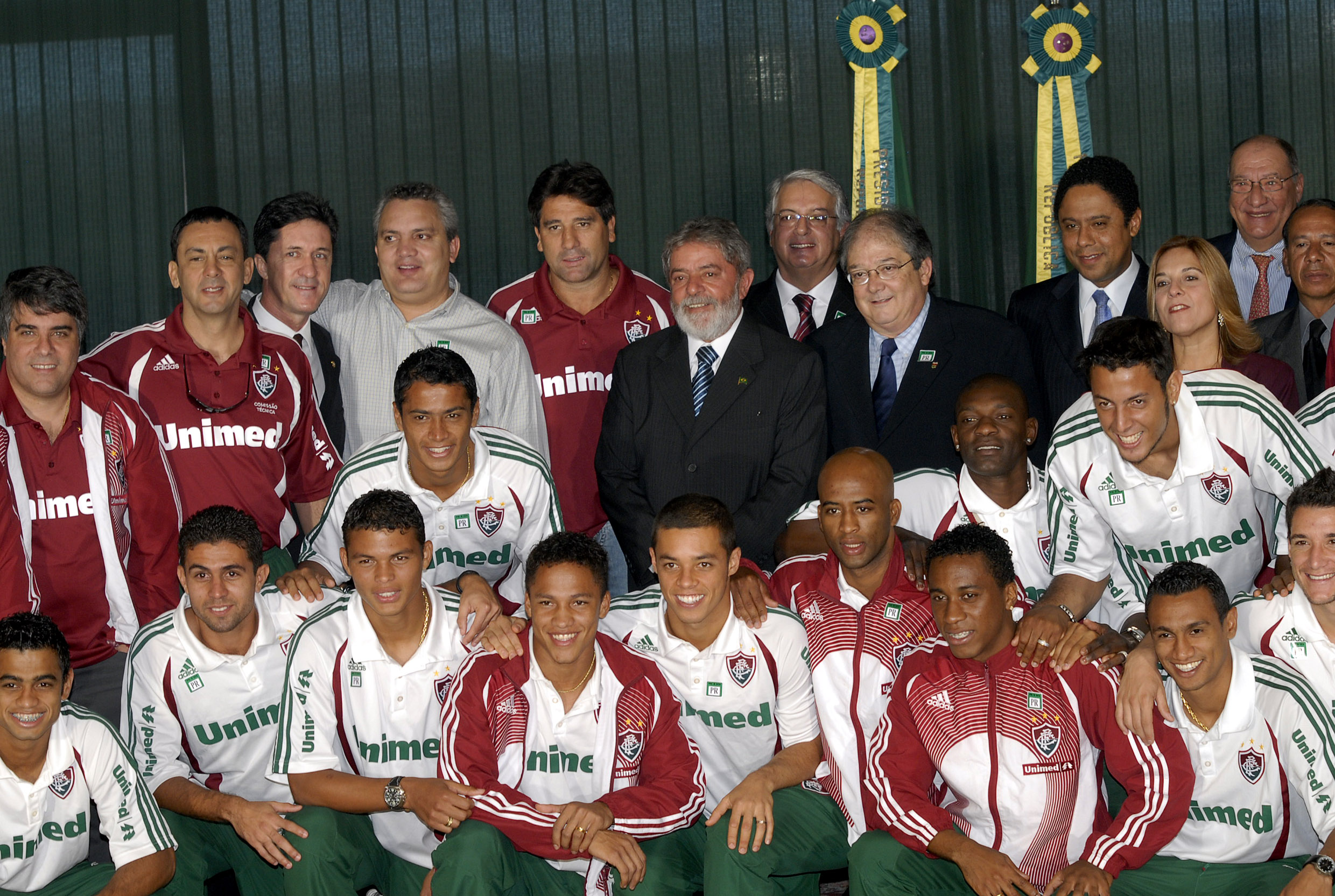
President Lula with Fluminense players, champions of the 2007 Brazil Cup.

Fluminense had good campaigns in the 2000, 2001, and 2002 Serie A, finishing in the top four each of these times. Fluminense's first title of the 21st century was the 2002 Campeonato Carioca. In 2005, Fluminense won the Campeonato Caroica and the Taca Rio, and finished fifth in the Brasileirao. Later that year, they reached the final of the Copa do Brasil again, but lost to Serie B club Paulista 2–0, marking one of the few times that a Serie B club won the Copa do Brasil.

In 2007, Fluminense won the Copa do Brasil beating Figueirense in the final, and was admitted to the Copa Libertadores again after 23 years. In the 2007 Serie A, the club finished fourth, and Thiago Neves won the Golden Ball for the league's best player.

The club's 2008 Copa Libertadores campaign saw them reach the finals and included a remarkable 6–0 victory against Arsenal de Sarandí in the group stage, winning both games against Colombian club Atlético Nacional in R16, a comeback against São Paulo in the QF, and disposing of defending champions Boca Juniors in the SF with a 3–1 victory. Fluminense eventually finished runner-up, losing the finals to LDU Quito on penalties after a 5–5 draw on aggregate, despite a hat-trick from Thiago Neves in the second leg. Fluminense had already faced LDU in the group stage, winning 1-0 and drawing 0-0. The club finished fourteenth in the Serie A that season, and only finished one point away from relegation, but curiously still qualifying for the following years Copa Sudamericana.

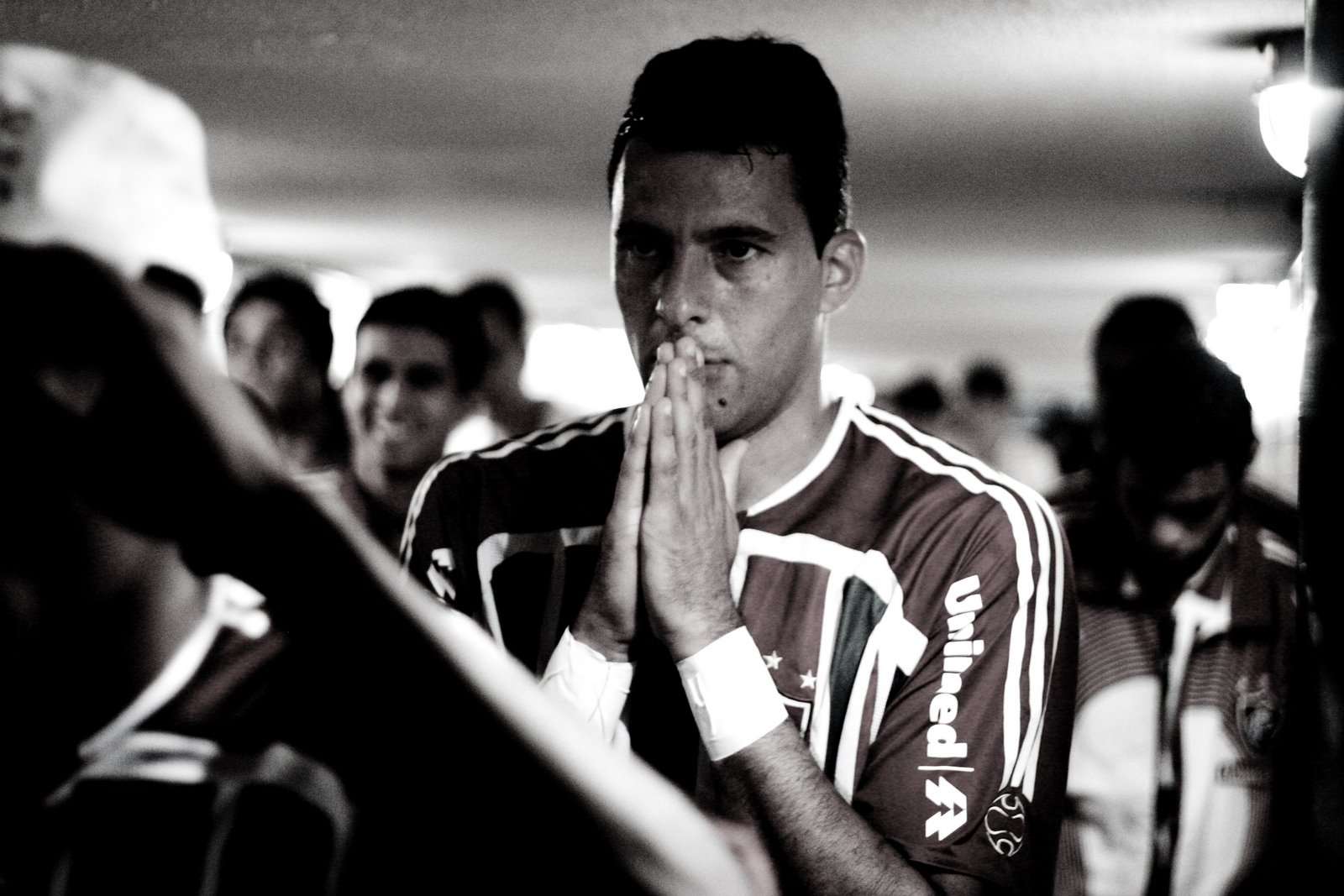
Washington Cerqueira before the 2008 Copa Libertadores final

After signing 27 players and going through 5 different managers in 2009, Fluminense found themselves struggling to avoid another relegation from Série A. With less than one-third of the championship left, the mathematical probability of the club's relegation was 98%. At this point, manager Cuca decided to dispense with some of the more experienced players and gave Fluminense's youngsters a chance. That, along with Fred's recovery from a serious injury and substantial support from the fans, allowed not only a sensational escape from relegation with five matches remaining, but also placed Fluminense in the Copa Sudamericana finals, having eliminated rivals Flamengo. For the second year in a row, the club contested a continental cup. In a repeat of the previous year's Copa Libertadores, Fluminense lost the finals to LDU Quito.

=== 2010s: Two Brazilian championships ===
For 2010, Muricy Ramalho replaced Cuca. His first task was in the 2010 Copa do Brasil quarter-finals against Grêmio, where Flumiense were eliminated 5–3 on aggregate. However, this elimination was not considered a "failure", in part because with this elimination the club was not participating in any other competitions and could fully focus on the Brasileirao. Eventually, the elimination helped the club, and that year, with Ramalho's effective defensive block conceding the fewest number of goals in the league, Fluminense won the Brazilian championship for the third time in their history after 26 years, securing it with a 1–0 victory at home to already relegated Guarani. It was also the fourth title for coach Ramalho in a decade: Ramalho had won the title three times in a row with São Paulo from 2006 to 2008. Darío Conca was named the Brazilian Championship's Player of the Season, playing all 38 league matches, while Fred, Washington, and Deco were decisive players in Fluminense's title-winning campaign.

For the 2011 season, Fluminense appointed Abel Braga, who led the team to a third-placed finish in the Serie A and qualification for the following year's Copa Libertadores, despite being eliminated in the round of 16 of the aforementioned competition by Club Libertad. The club decided to keep Abel Braga for 2012 and made big investments for the squad, bringing back Thiago Neves and signing youngster Wellington Nem. On 13 May 2012, Fluminense won the Campeonato Carioca, beating Rio rivals Botafogo 5–1 on aggregate for their first title of the 2012 season. In the Copa Libertadores, Fluminense was eliminated in the quarter-finals by powerhouse Boca Juniors, losing 2–1 on aggregate. Later that year, on 11 November, they won their fourth Brazilian championship after defeating near-relegated Palmeiras 3–2, with three matchdays left. Striker Fred was also the competition's top scorer, with 20 goals, and received the CBF Best Player award. Goalkeeper Diego Cavalieri had a phenomenal season and won the Bola de Prata as the league's best goalkeeper, and Abel Braga was chosen as best coach.

==== 2013: Close call ====
In 2013, Fluminense was eliminated in the Copa Libertadores quarter-finals again, this time to Olimpia. In the Série A, things took a turn for the worse when they lost six of their first nine matches, leading to the sacking of Abel Braga. Seven undefeated matches in September steered the club away from relegation, but an eight-match winless run put the club back into the fight for relegation, mainly due to the absences of stars Deco, Fred, Thiago Neves, Carlinhos and Wellington Nem, and in December 2013, a 2–1 victory away to Bahia in the last round of the Série A had Fluminense mathematically relegated to Série B. However, Portuguesa and Fluminense's main rivals Flamengo fielded ineligible players in their matches against Grêmio and Cruzeiro respectively, thus losing 4 points after a verdict by STJD (Brazil's governing football jury). The points lost by Flamengo and Portuguesa allowed Fluminense to stay in Série A, with Portuguesa being relegated and Flamengo ending the championship as the lowest-ranked non-relegated club.

==== Since 2014: Rebuild ====
In 2014, Fluminense brought back Darío Conca, as well as Walter and Cícero. Coupled with Fred's and Carlinhos’ recoveries from injury, Fluminense spent the majority of the 2014 Série A in the top five and fighting for one of the berths at the 2015 Copa Libertadores, ultimately failing to reach its goal after an unstable final stretch and finishing 6th. In December, Fluminense ended its partnership with its main sponsor, Unimed. For fifteen years, the health insurance company was the main investor in signing players, especially after the team won the 2007 Copa do Brasil, bringing to the club athletes such as Darío Conca, Deco, Diego Cavalieri, Fred, Rafael Sóbis, Thiago Neves and Washington. From 2015 onwards, Fluminense underwent a remodeling, with the departure of some of its main players. The club's youth categories became fundamental for its maintenance in the first division in the following years, and the sale of young players became the club's main source of income.

In 2019, Fluminense hired Fernando Diniz, a young coach with innovative ideas within Brazilian football, but political conflicts within the club forced him out. The following year, the club brought back Fred, one of the greatest idols in the club's history, and in the 2020 season qualified for the Copa Libertadores under Odair Hellmann's tutelage.

=== 2020s: Copa Libertadores title and FIFA Club World Cup finalist ===

2023 Copa Libertadores final starting lineup

The team returns to compete in the Copa Libertadores after eight years out of the competition, and with consistent campaigns in the Brazilian championship it manages to secure places in the competitions in consecutive editions of the Libertadores. However, after Odair's departure, the club has difficulty maintaining a coach, with Marcão, Roger Machado and Abel Braga taking over the position. In 2022, after winning the Campeonato Carioca against rivals Flu, their first trophy in a decade, with Argentine striker Germán Cano being the star of the team, and being eliminated from the Libertadores, Abel Braga retires from his coaching career, and Fluminense decides to give Fernando Diniz another chance.

In 2022, Fluminense achieves its best place in the Brazilian Championship in the last ten years, a third place, with an offensive team that is noted for its fluidity and ball possession, and the team qualifies for the group stage of the 2023 Copa Libertadores. In the beginning of the season, the football played by the team is considered by many to be the best in South America, and the team reaches the Campeonato Carioca finals against Flamengo; in the first match the red-black team wins 2–0, but in the second game Fluminense achieved a 4–1 victory, winning the Campeonato Carioca for a second year in a row against its main rival, and Diniz clinching his first trophy with the club. In the 2023 Libertadores, Fluminense falls into group D, along with River Plate (Argentina), The Strongest (Bolivia) and Sporting Cristal (Peru), despite being considered one of the most difficult groups in the edition, Fluminense ranks first, inflicting the biggest defeat in River Plate's history in the competition, 5–1 at Maracanã. In the final stage of the dispute, the opponents were Argentinos Juniors, Olimpia (Paraguay) and Internacional, the team defeated all opponents without suffering any defeat.

The Maracanã was previously chosen to be the stage for the final; on the other side the opponent would be Boca Juniors, who sought to become champions of the competition for the seventh time, and with this become the greatest champion of the competition, tied to Independiente. In the final, striker Germán Cano opened the scoring for Fluminense, but Peruvian right-back Luis Advíncula tied the match for Boca; the match then went into extra time, when youngster John Kennedy, coming from the youth team, came off the bench and scored the team's second goal. The match ended 2–1 for Fluminense, who lifted the Copa Libertadores trophy for the first time. The Copa Libertadores win sent Fluminense to play in the FIFA Club World Cup semi final, where they beat African champions Al Ahly from Egypt 2–0, but lost 4–0 in the final against Manchester City.

== Season statistics ==
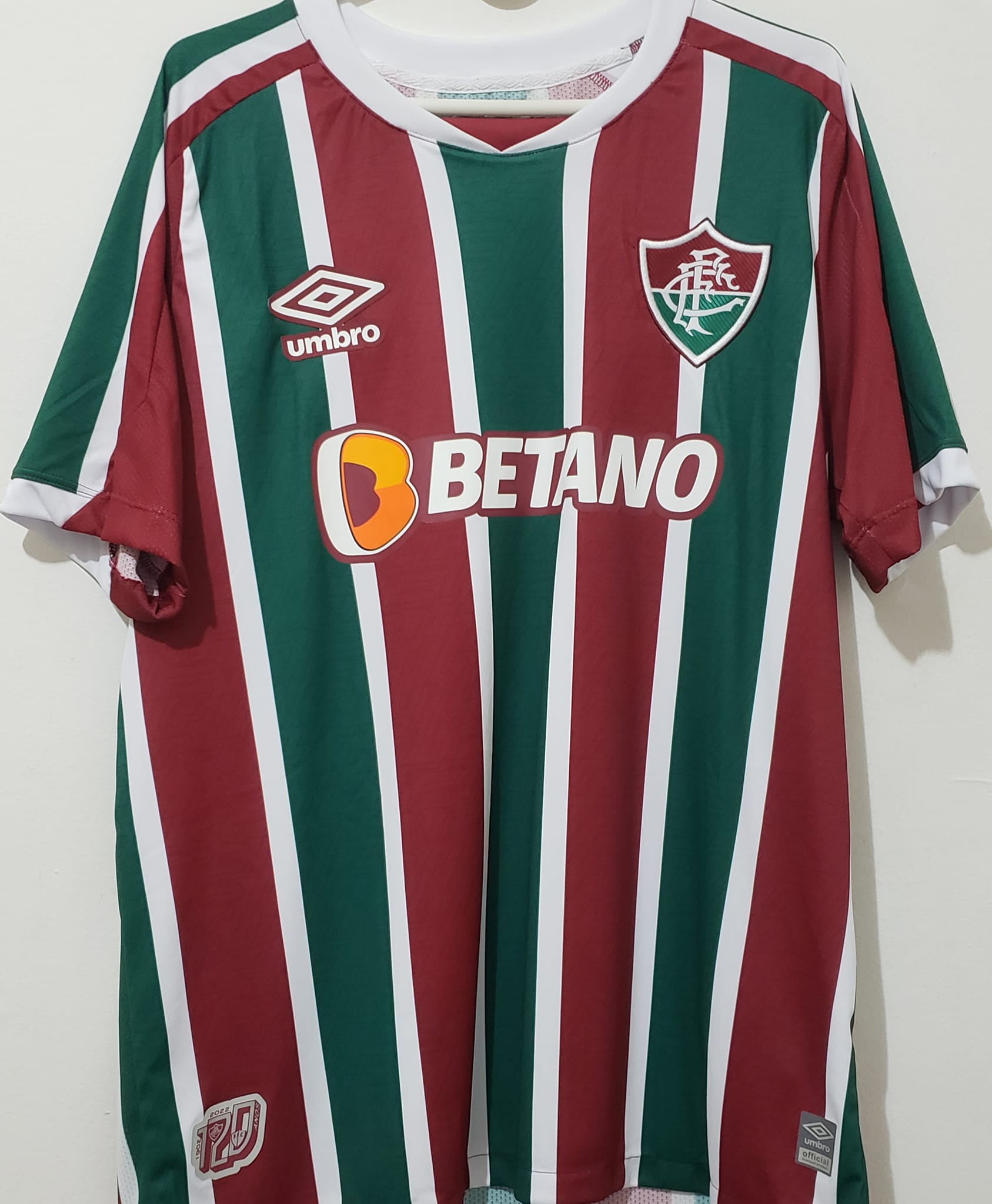
Fluminense home shirt (2022)

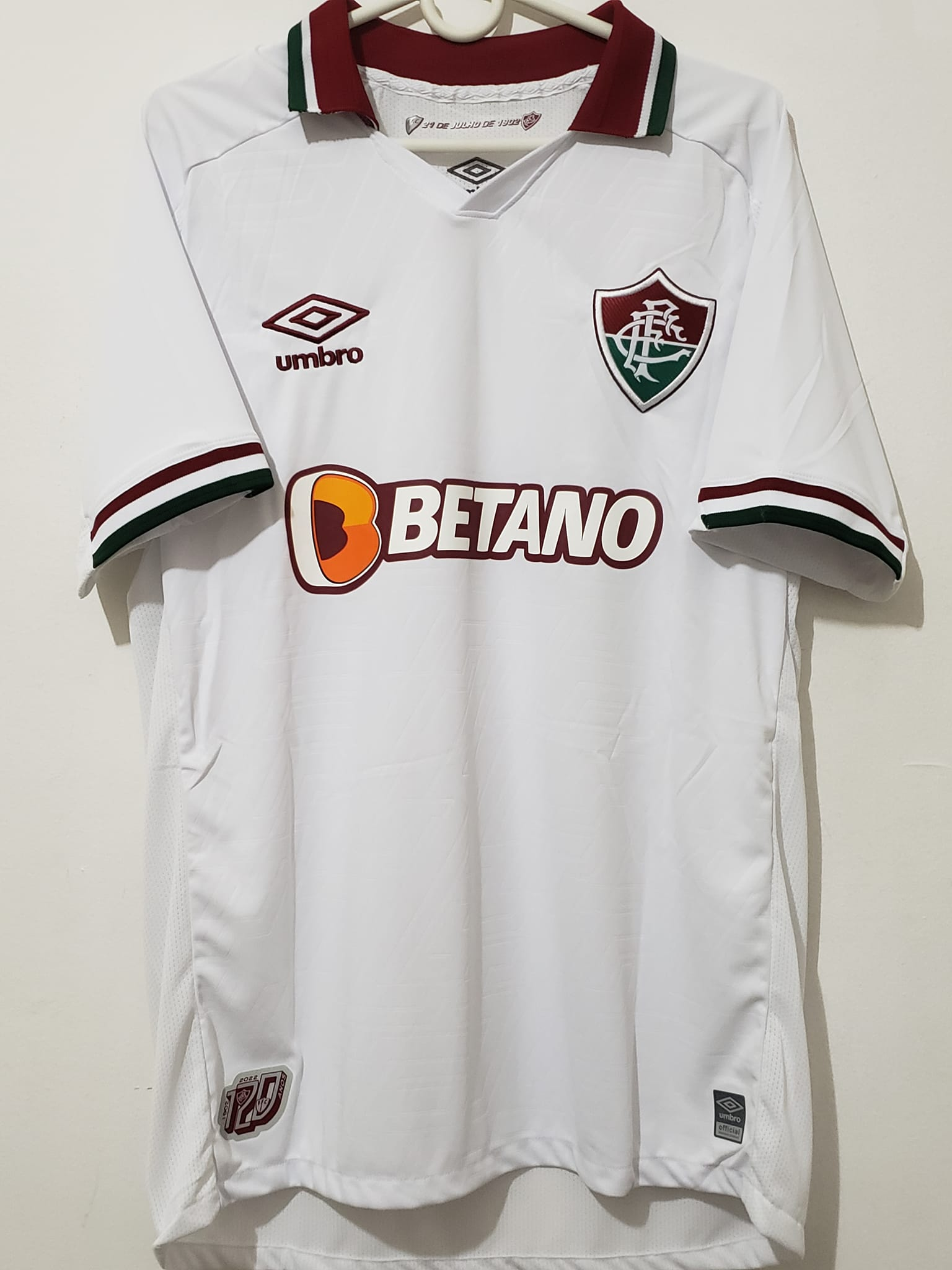
Fluminense reserve shirt (2022)

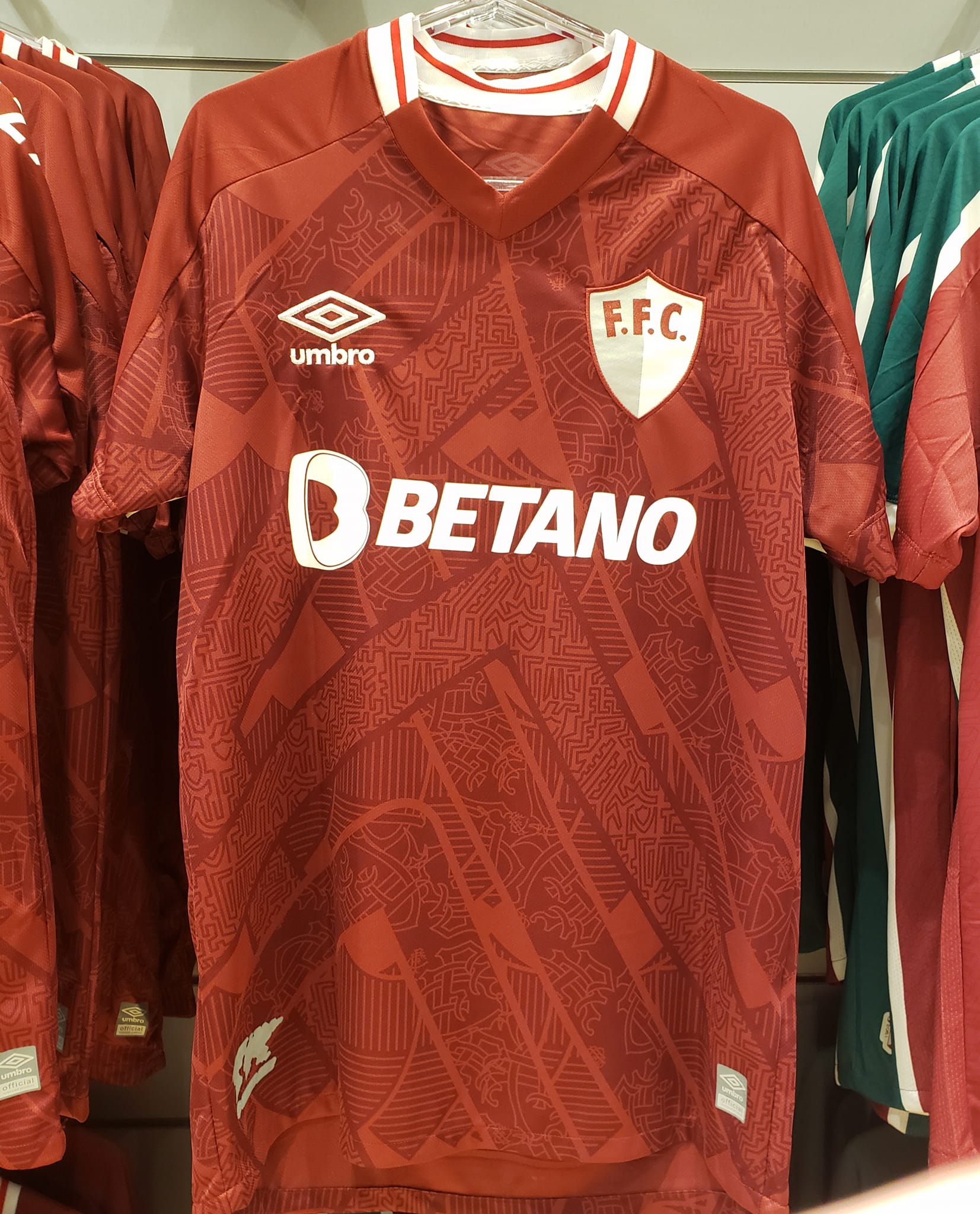
Fluminense alternative shirt (2022)

Fluminense have taken part in 57 of the 68 official Serie A championships organized in Brazil since 1959.

=== Taça Brasil ===
Year	Position	Participants	Year	Position	Participants
1959	-	16	1964	-	22
1960	3º	17	1965	-	22
1961	-	18	1966	4º	22
1962	-	18	1967	-	21
1963	-	20	1968	-	23

=== Roberto Gomes Pedrosa Tournament ===
Year	Position	Participants
1967	13º	15
1968	12º	17
1969	9º	17
1970	1º	17

=== Brazilian Championship ===
Year	Position	Participants	Year	Position	Participants
1971	16º	20	1981	11º	44
1972	14º	26	1982	5º	44
1973	23º	40	1983	18º	44
1974	24º	40	1984	1º	41
1975	3º	42	1985	22º	44
1976	4º	54	1986	6º	48
1977	26º	62	1987	7º	16
1978	22º	74	1988	3º	24
1979	52º	94	1989	15º	22
1980	11º	44	1990	15º	20

Year	Position	Participants	Year	Position	Participants
1991	4º	20	2001	3º	28
1992	14º	20	2002	4º	26
1993	28º	32	2003	19º	24
1994	15º	24	2004	9º	24
1995	4º	24	2005	5º	22
1996	23º	24	2006	15º	20
1997	25º▼	26	2007	4º	20
1998	19º▼ (Série B)	24	2008	14º	20
1999	1º▲ (Série C)	36	2009	16º	20
2000	3º	25	2010	1º	20

Year	Position	Participants	Year	Position	Participants
2011	3º	20	2018	12º	20
2012	1º	20	2019	14º	20
2013	15º	20	2020	5º	20
2014	6º	20	2021	7º	20
2015	13º	20	2022	3º	20
2016	13º	20	2023	7º	20
2017	14º	20	2024	13º	20

== Records ==
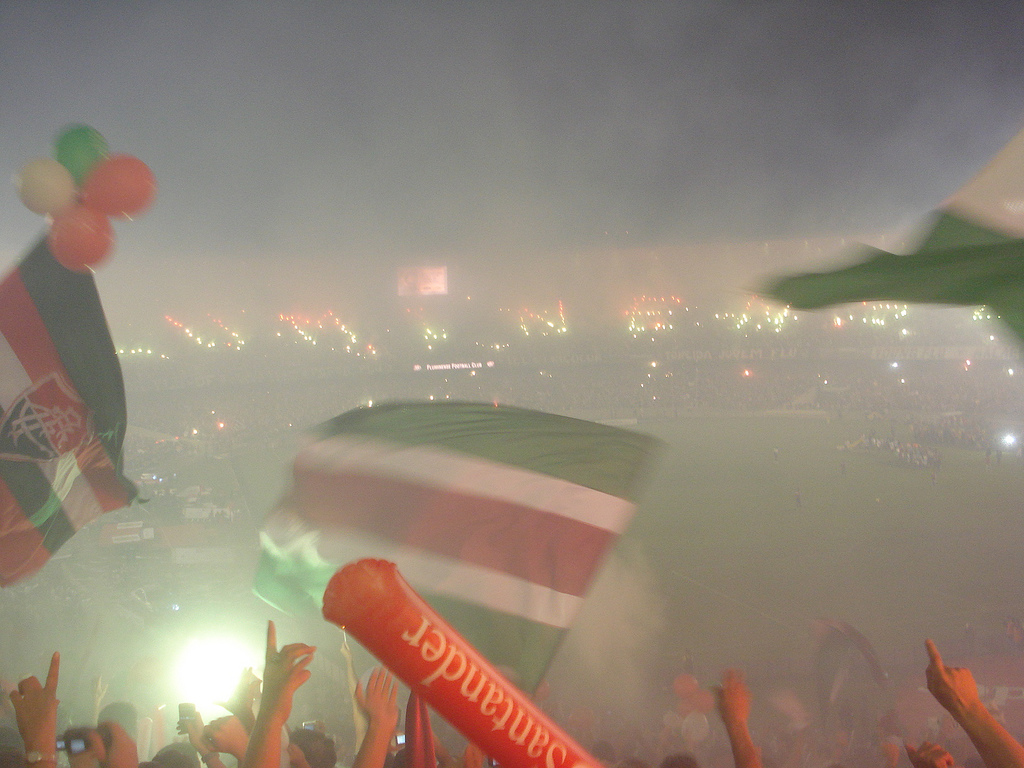
Fluminense fans display a luminous mosaic in Maracanã.

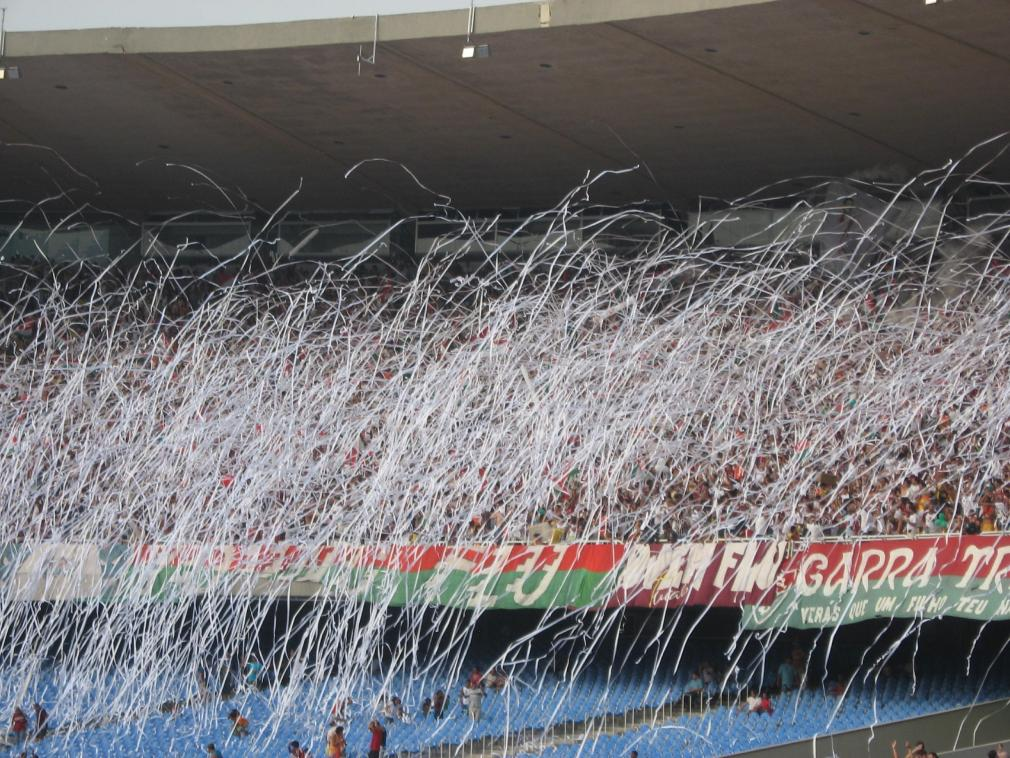
Fluminense supporters at the Maracanã

=== Highest attendances – Maracanã ===
According to the RSSSF, these were the highest attendances in Fluminense matches:

1. Fluminense 0-0 Flamengo (1963): 194,603 (Note: 177,656 paying, a record for persons present at Maracanã stadium.)
2. Fluminense 3–2 Flamengo (1969): 171,599
3. Fluminense 1–0 Botafogo (1971): 160,000
4. Fluminense 0–0 Flamengo (1976): 155,116
5. Fluminense 1–0 Flamengo (1984): 153,520
6. Fluminense 1–1 Corinthians (1976): 146,043

=== Highest average attendance at public competition for Fluminense ===
- Largest average attendance in the Copa Libertadores (RJ): 59,759 (54,912 paying, 2023)
- Largest average attendance in the Copa Sudamericana (RJ): 29,357 (27,318 paying, 2009)
- Largest average attendance in international tournaments (RJ): 48,797 (37,541 paying, Copa Rio, 1952)
- Largest average attendance in national championships (RJ): 43,541 paying (1976)
- Largest average attendance in the Tournament Roberto Gomes Pedrosa (RJ): 40,408 paying (1970)
- Largest average attendance in the Brazil Cup (RJ): 27,123 paying (2007)
- Largest average attendance in the Rio-São Paulo Tournament (RJ): 33,018 paying (1960)
- Largest average attendance in the state championship: 47,814 paying (1969, all stages)
- Largest average attendance in the state championship in the Maracanã Stadium: 93,560 paying (1969, 10 matches)

== Supporters ==
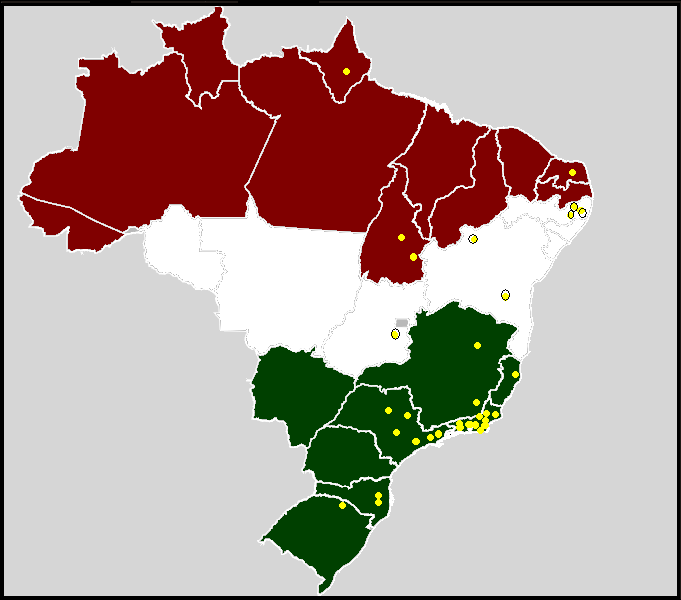
Map of the largest concentrations of Fluminense supporters.

The supporters of Fluminense Football Club are usually related to the upper classes of Rio de Janeiro. However, the popularity of the club reaches beyond the city limits. Recent polls have estimated the number of supporters to be between 1.3% and 3.7% of the Brazilian population, and between the 11th and 15th most popular club in the nation, falling behind Rio rivals Vasco, but slightly above Botafogo. Considering a population of 203 million people, that would account for numbers between 2.6 and 7.5 million. According to the club's official website, Flu has over 5 million supporters worldwide.

The best attendance ever observed in a Fluminense match was registered on 15 December 1963 in a derby against Flamengo. On that day, an impressive number of 194,603 people showed up at Maracanã stadium. This occasion remains as the stadium's record for a match between clubs.

Notable supporters of Fluminense include composers Cartola and Chico Buarque, musicians Elis Regina, Ivan Lins, Pixinguinha, Renato Russo and Tom Jobim, actors Breno Mello, Chico Díaz, Dalton Vigh, Hugo Carvana, and Thiago Fragoso, and actresses Deborah Secco, Leticia Spiller, and Sheron Menezzes, poet Mário Lago, journalist and songwriter Nelson Motta, dramatist, journalist and writer Nelson Rodrigues, modernist architect Oscar Niemeyer, FIFA president of honor João Havelange, 1970 FIFA World Cup winners Gérson and Carlos Alberto Torres, former Chelsea central defender Thiago Silva, Left-back legend Marcelo, racing driver Cacá Bueno, sailors Maertine Grael and Torben Grael, former Minister of Culture Gilberto Gil, inventor and aeronaut Santos Dumont, Silvio Santos, the owner of SBT, the second largest Brazilian television network, Golden Globe Award winner Fernanda Torres and her mother, Academy Award nominee Fernanda Montenegro.

== Honours ==
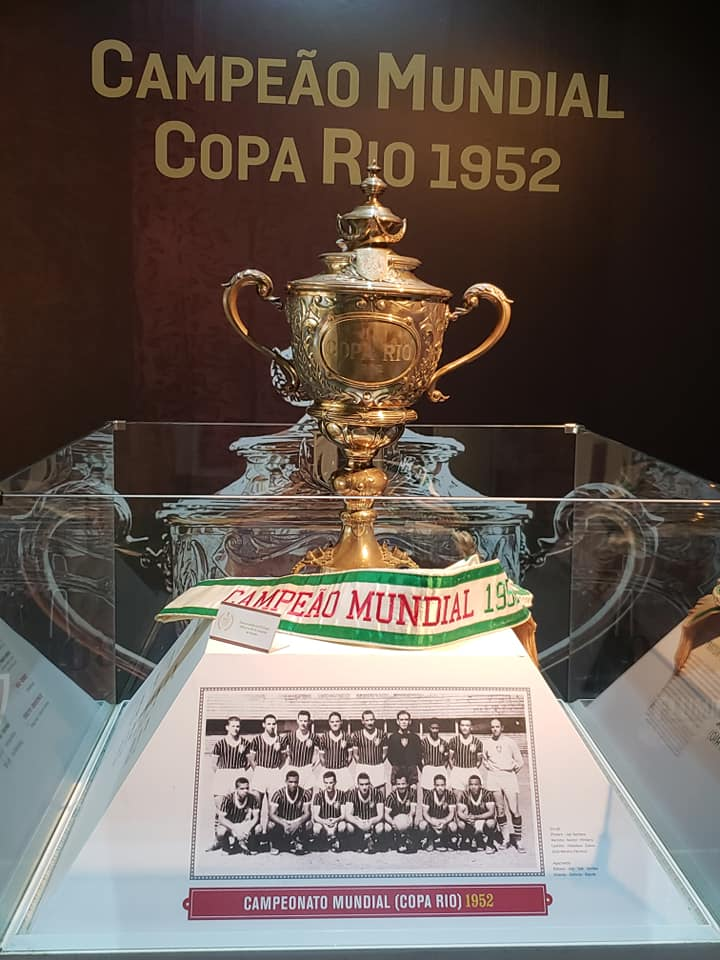
The cup won by Fluminense (team displayed below) exhibited at the club's hall of trophies.

=== Official tournaments ===
Continental
Competitions	Titles	Seasons
Copa Libertadores	1	2023
Recopa Sudamericana	1	2024
International
Competitions	Titles	Seasons
Copa Rio	1^{s}	1952^{(1)}
National
Competitions	Titles	Seasons
Campeonato Brasileiro Série A	4	1970, 1984, 2010, 2012
Copa do Brasil	1	2007
Campeonato Brasileiro Série C	1	1999
Inter-state
Competitions	Titles	Seasons
Torneio Rio–São Paulo	2	1957, 1960^{(2)}
Taça Ioduran	1^{s}	1919
State
Competitions	Titles	Seasons
Campeonato Carioca	33	1906, 1907, 1908, 1909, 1911, 1917, 1918, 1919, 1924, 1936, 1937, 1938, 1940, 1941, 1946, 1951, 1959, 1964, 1969, 1971, 1973, 1975, 1976, 1980, 1983, 1984, 1985, 1995, 2002, 2005, 2012, 2022, 2023
Copa Rio	1	1998
Torneio Início	9	1916, 1924, 1925, 1940, 1941, 1943, 1954, 1956, 1965^{(3)}
Torneio Aberto	1^{s}	1935
Torneio Municipal	2	1938, 1948
Torneio Extra	1	1941

- record
- ^{s} shared record

^{(1)} FIFA recognized the Copa Rio as an Inter-Confederations Cup during the 2025 FIFA Club World Cup.

^{(2)} In 1940 the competition was interrupted with Fluminense and Flamengo in the lead, without the CBD making the title official, however, the clubs and newspapers at the time considered the result definitive and declared the Fluminense and Flamengo as the legitimate champions of the competition. The club currently considers itself champion of the competition and includes this title among its achievements.

^{(3)} In 1927, having won the title on the field, Fluminense asked for its annulment for having failed to comply with the regulations, by including two substitutes in its ranks, in a letter sent to AMEA, which resulted in the subsequent annulment of the title.

=== Others tournaments ===
==== International ====
- Torneio Internacional do Rio de Janeiro (1): 1973
- Copa Ciudad Viña del Mar (1): 1976
- Tournoi de Paris (2): 1976, 1987
- Teresa Herrera Trophy (1): 1977
- Seoul Tournament (1): 1984
- Kirin Cup (1): 1987
- Kiev Tournament (1): 1989

==== National and Inter-state ====
- Torneio José de Paula Júnior (1): 1952
- Copa das Municipalidades do Paraná (1): 1953
- Torneio Quadrangular Pará-Guanabara (1): 1966
- Torneio Quadrangular de Cachoeiro de Itapemirim (1): 1969
- Torneio José Macedo Aguiar (1): 1971
- Copa Governador Faria Lima (1): 1977
- Copa Vale do Paraíba (1): 1977
- Torneio de Maceió (1): 1994
- Troféu Osmar Santos (1): 2010
- Troféu João Saldanha (1): 2011
- Primeira Liga (1): 2016

==== State Tournament Rounds and Stages ====
- Taça Guanabara (13): 1966, 1969, 1971, 1975, 1983, 1985, 1991, 1993, 2012, 2017, 2022, 2023, 2026
- Taça Rio (4): 1990, 2005, 2018, 2020
- Other Campeonato Carioca rounds (6): 1970, 1972, 1973, 1976, 1980, 2012
- Campeonato da Capital do Rio de Janeiro - Copa Rio stage (1): 1994

=== Runners-up ===
- FIFA Club World Cup (1): 2023
- Copa Libertadores (1): 2008
- Copa Sudamericana (1): 2009
- Campeonato Brasileiro Série A (1): 1937
- Copa do Brasil (2): 1992, 2005
- Torneio Rio–São Paulo (1): 1954
- Taça Ioduran (1): 1918
- Campeonato Carioca (27): 1910, 1915, 1920, 1925, 1927, 1933, 1935, 1943, 1949, 1952, 1953, 1956, 1957, 1960, 1963, 1970, 1972, 1979-II, 1991, 1993, 2003, 2011, 2017, 2020, 2021, 2025, 2026
- Copa Rio (2): 1992, 1994

=== Youth team ===
- Campeonato Brasileiro Sub-20 (1): 2015
- Campeonato Brasileiro Sub-17 (2): 2020, 2024
- Copa do Brasil Sub-17 (1): 2024
- Copa São Paulo de Juniores (5): 1971, 1973, 1977, 1986, 1989
- Copa Santiago de Futebol Juvenil (1): 1999
- Copa Macaé de Juvenis (2): 2002, 2003

=== Awards ===
- Olympic Cup (1): 1949
- Carioca Champion of the 20th Century: 1906–2000
- Taça Eficiência (14): 1935, 1941, 1948, 1951, 1952, 1953, 1957, 1959, 1963, 1964, 1969, 1970, 1976, 1984
- Taça Disciplina (7): 1946, 1948, 1956, 1958, 1963, 1972, 1977

== Chronology of main titles ==
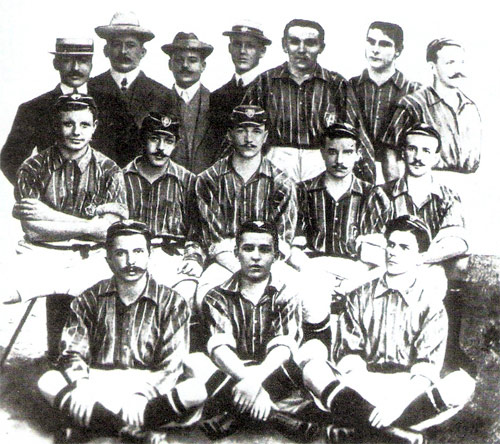
The team that won its first Campeonato Carioca, in 1906

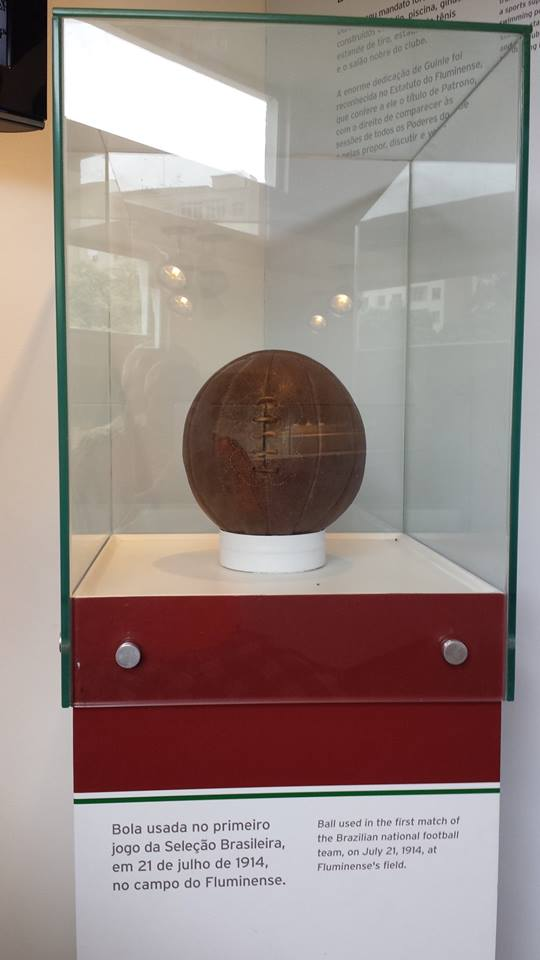
Ball used in the first-ever match of the Brazil national team at Fluminense

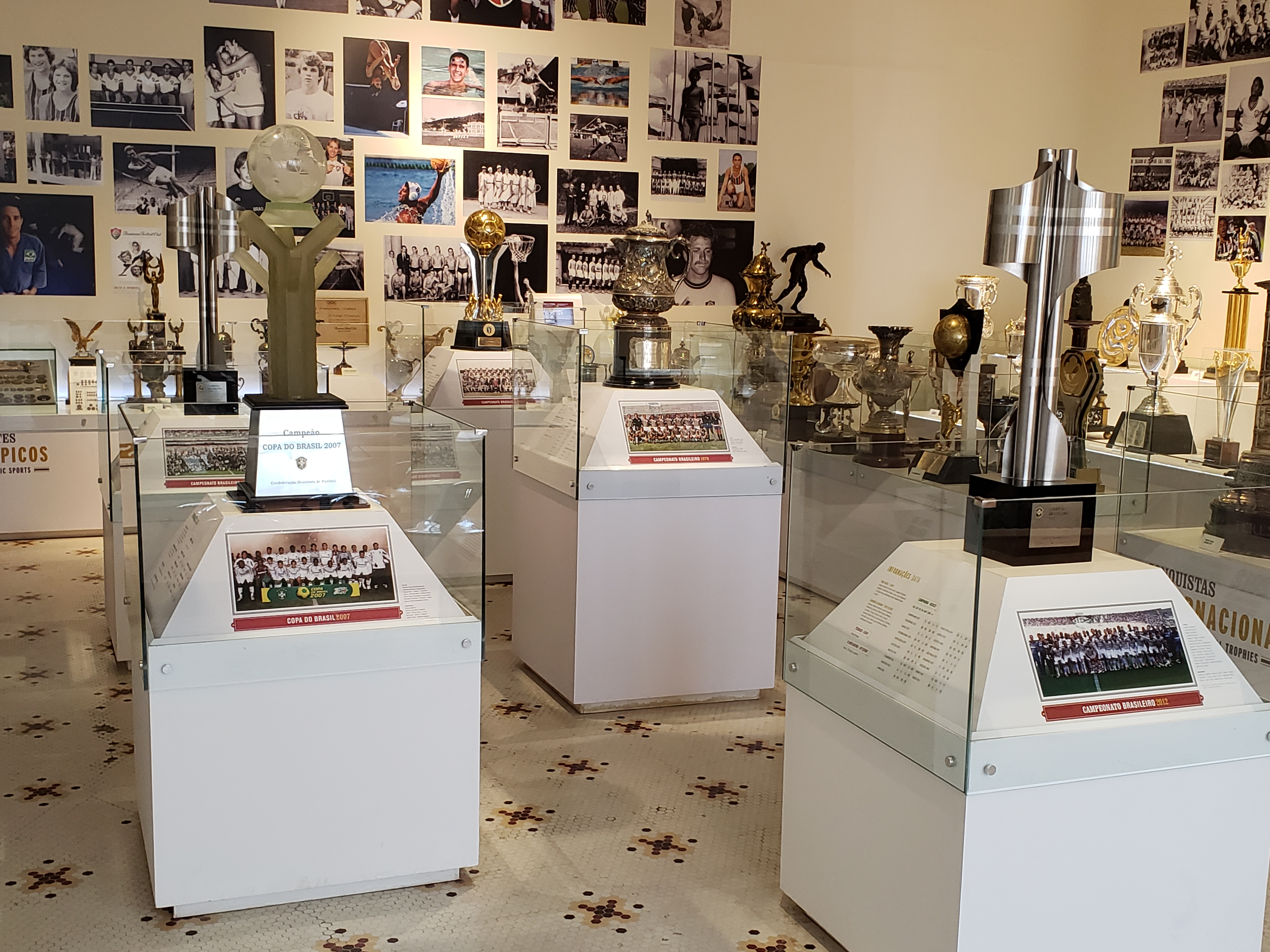
Trophy room at the Fluminense HQ

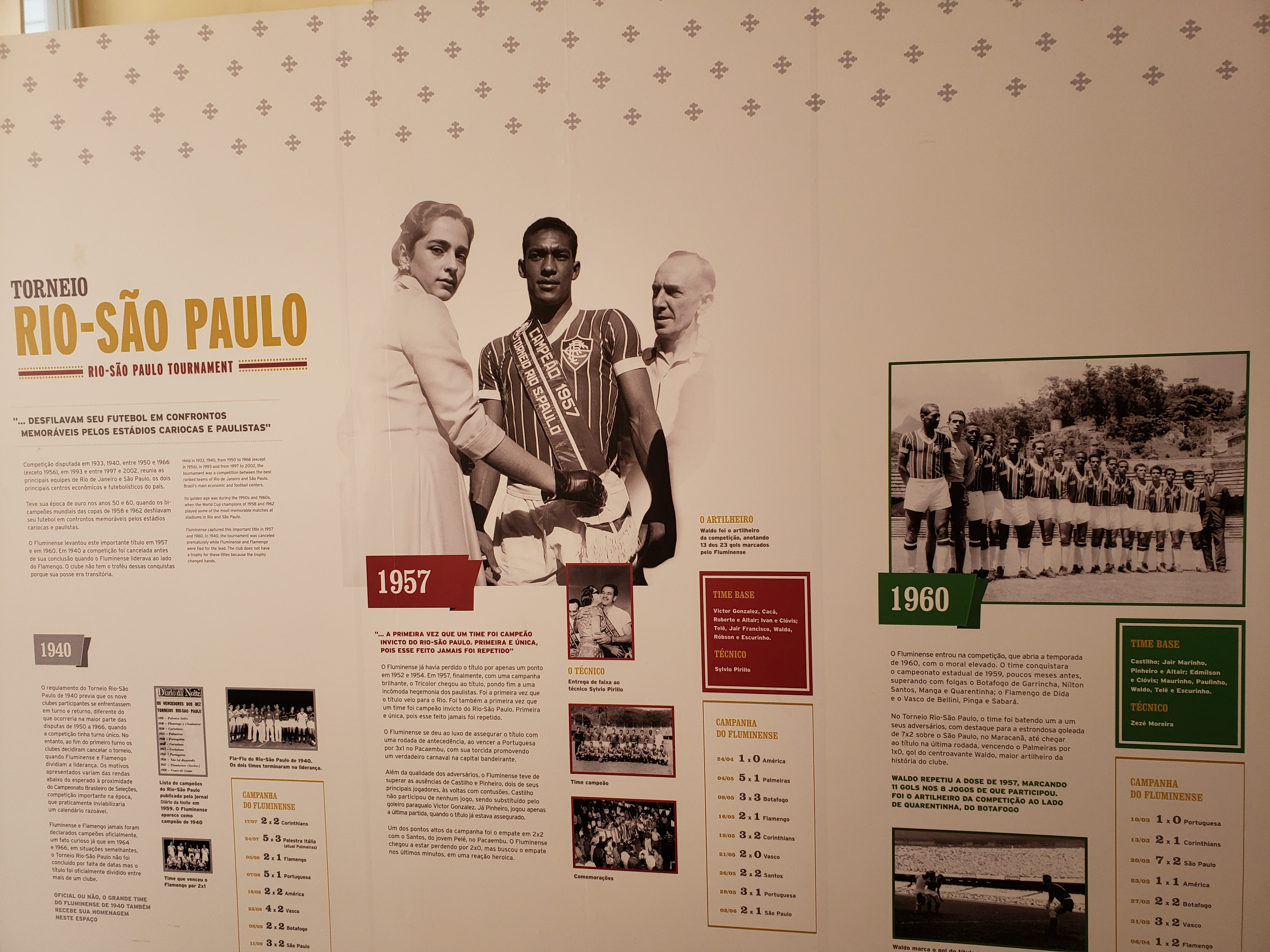
Information on the Rio–São Paulo Tournament at the Fluminense Trophy Room

Competition	Season	N.º
Carioca Championship	1906	1º
Carioca Championship	1907	2º
Carioca Championship	1908	3º
Carioca Championship	1909	4º
Carioca Championship	1911	5º
Carioca Championship	1917	6º
Carioca Championship	1918	7º
Carioca Championship	1919	8º
Carioca Championship	1924	9º
Carioca Championship	1936	10º
Carioca Championship	1937	11º
Carioca Championship	1938	12º
Rio–São Paulo Tournament	1940	13º
Carioca Championship	1940	14º
Carioca Championship	1941	15º
Carioca Championship	1946	16º
Carioca Championship	1951	17º
Rio Cup (International)	1952	18º
Rio–São Paulo Tournament	1957	19º
Carioca Championship	1959	20º
Rio–São Paulo Tournament	1960	21º
Carioca Championship	1964	22º
Carioca Championship	1969	23º
Brazilian Championship	1970	24º
Carioca Championship	1971	25º
Carioca Championship	1973	26º
Carioca Championship	1975	27º
Carioca Championship	1976	28º
Carioca Championship	1980	29º
Carioca Championship	1983	30º
Brazilian Championship	1984	31º
Carioca Championship	1984	32º
Carioca Championship	1985	33º
Carioca Championship	1995	34º
Carioca Championship	2002	35º
Carioca Championship	2005	36º
Brazil Cup	2007	37º
Brazilian Championship	2010	38º
Carioca Championship	2012	39º
Brazilian Championship	2012	40º
First League (Brazil)	2016	41º
Carioca Championship	2022	42º
Carioca Championship	2023	43º
Copa Libertadores	2023	44º
Recopa Sudamericana	2024	45º

== Rivalries ==
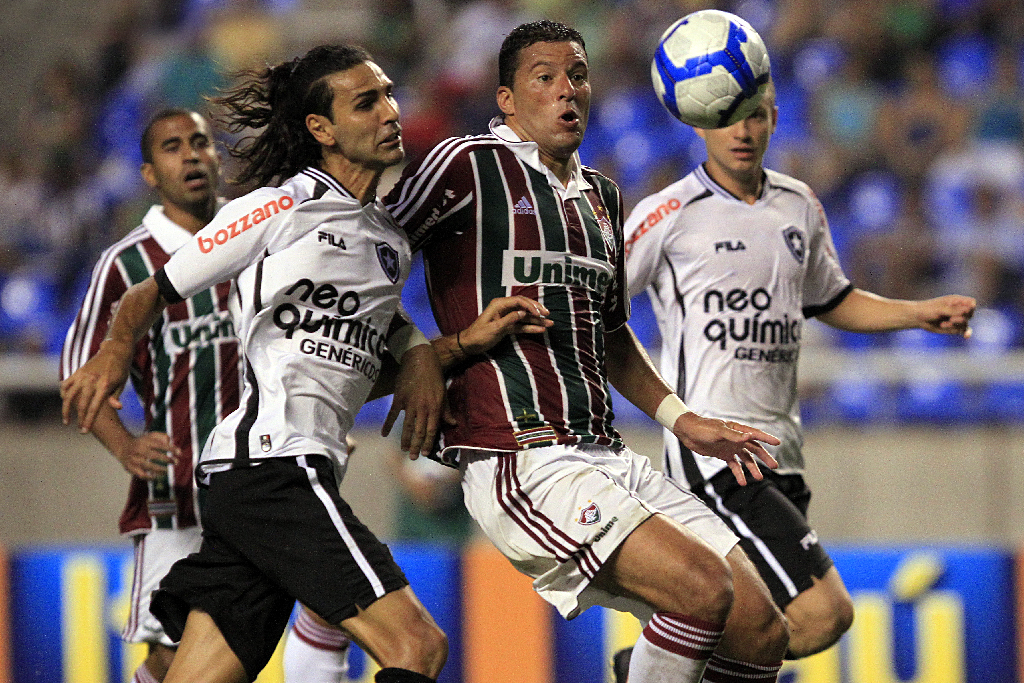
Leandro Guerreiro from Botafogo disputing for the ball with Washington from Fluminense.

According to the fluzao.info site, the average paying public at the principal classicos of Fluminense played in the Estádio do Maracanã is 60,107 against Flamengo, 43,735 against Vasco da Gama, 34,359 against Botafogo, 25,127 against America and 22,527 against Bangu (1950–2010). These statistics could be about 20% higher, given the issues of the distribution of gratuities at Maracanã.

=== Grandpa Derby ===
Grandpa Derby or Grandfather Derby (Clássico Vovô), played with Botafogo. The name comes from being the two oldest practicing football clubs among the great clubs of Rio de Janeiro, and this is also the oldest derby in Brazil, because its first game was on 22 October 1905, friendly that Fluminense won by 6–0. Along with six other clubs, they were responsible for creating the Carioca Football Championship in 1906.

=== Fla-Flu ===
Fla–Flu Derby, also called Derby of Crowds (Clássico das Multidões), played with Flamengo. It is considered by football experts and much of the sports media as one of the greatest classics in the world. According to writer Nelson Rodrigues, the derby was engendered by resentment. On the tricolor side, the fact that their starting players deserted and went to form Flamengo's football department, and on the red-black side, the fact that Fluminense still won the first match, circumstances that have been fundamental in generating the derby's mystique.

=== Giants' Derby ===
Giants' Derby (Clássico dos Gigantes), played with Vasco da Gama. The derby gets its name because of the "giant" matches that have been played between the two, these being the final for the 1984 Campeonato Brasileiro Série A, which was won by Fluminense, and the 1985 Copa Libertadores, which had two draws, in addition to several decisions Carioca Championship: 1949, 1956, 1970, 1972, 1975, 1976, 1980, 1984, 1993, 1994 and 2003.

=== Silvio Santos Derby ===
Silvio Santos Derby (Clássico Silvio Santos), played with Corinthians. It is perhaps the most representative among the various interstate confrontations with big Brazilian clubs played by Fluminense, given the fact that these clubs often intersect at decisive moments in their seasons. The Derby dates back to 1933, in a friendly match that marked both Fluminense's first match as a professional team and Corinthians' first inter-state match as a professional.

The fixture's name was given on 17 August 2024, after the Brazilian television host of the same name, died on the same day. Santos was a supporter of both clubs.

=== Rivalry with LDU ===
Since L.D.U. Quito defeated Fluminense in the 2008 Copa Libertadores final and the Copa Sudamericana final of the following year, a strong international rivalry has developed between the two teams. This rivalry reached new heights when the two teams met on a third international final for the 2024 Recopa Sudamericana, which was won by Fluminense. This has been the only case of two CONMEBOL teams facing each other on each of the three continental tournaments.

== Statistics ==
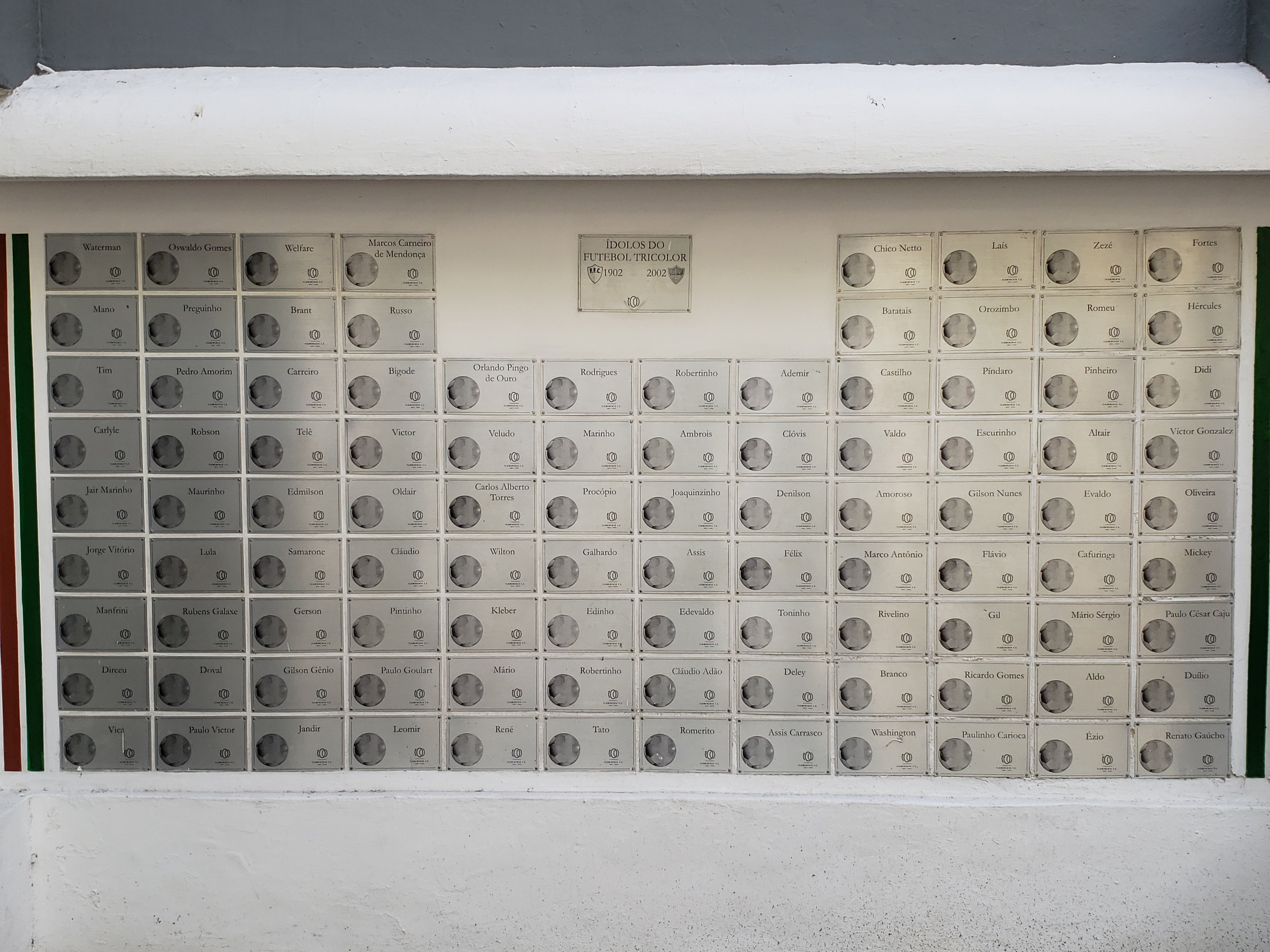
Fluminense idols honored by the club (1902-2002)

This is a list of statistics and records of Fluminense.

=== Players with most appearances ===
Name		Matches
1st	(Brazil) Castilho	699
2nd	(Brazil) Pinheiro	603
3rd	(Brazil) Telê Santana	556
4th	(Brazil) Altair	549
5th	(Brazil) Escurinho	490
6th	(Brazil) Rubens Galaxe	462
7th	(Brazil) Denílson	433
8th	(Brazil) Assis	424
9th	(Brazil) Gum	414
10th	(Brazil) Waldo	403

=== Top goalscorers ===
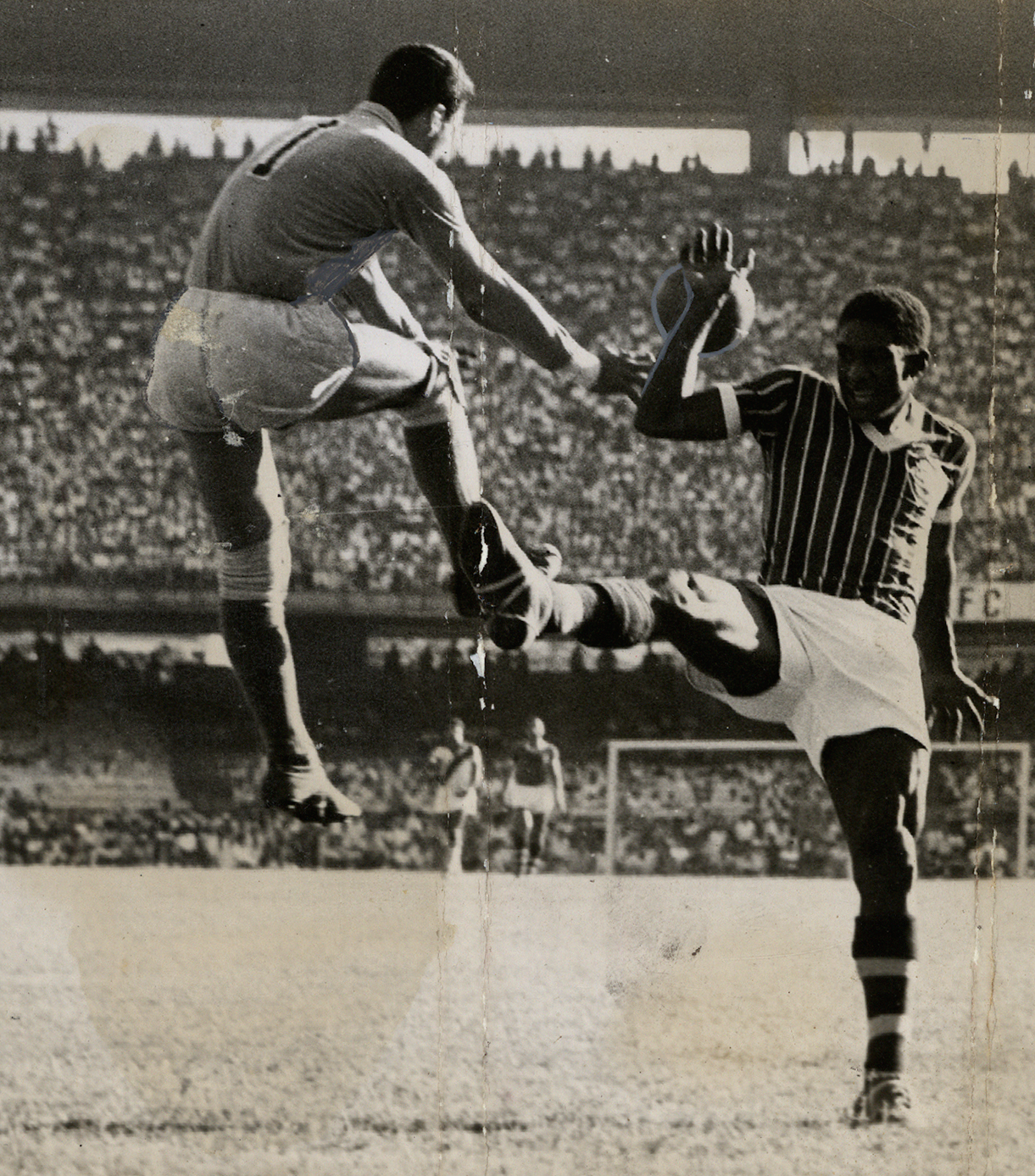
Waldo, for Fluminense, against goalkeeper Barbosa, from Vasco da Gama, at the Maracanã Stadium.

Name		Goals	Years
1st	(Brazil) Waldo	319	1954–61
2nd	(Brazil) Fred	199	2009-16 / 2020–22
3rd	(Brazil) Orlando Pingo de Ouro	184	1945-55
4th	(Brazil) Hércules	165	1935–42
5th	(Brazil) Telê Santana	164	1950–61
6th	(England) Henry Welfare	163	1913–23
7th	(Argentina) Russo	149	1933–44
8th	(Brazil) Preguinho	128	1925–39
9th	(Brazil) Washington César	124	1983–89
10th	(Brazil) Magno Alves	121	1998–2002 / 2015–2016

=== Coaches with most games ===
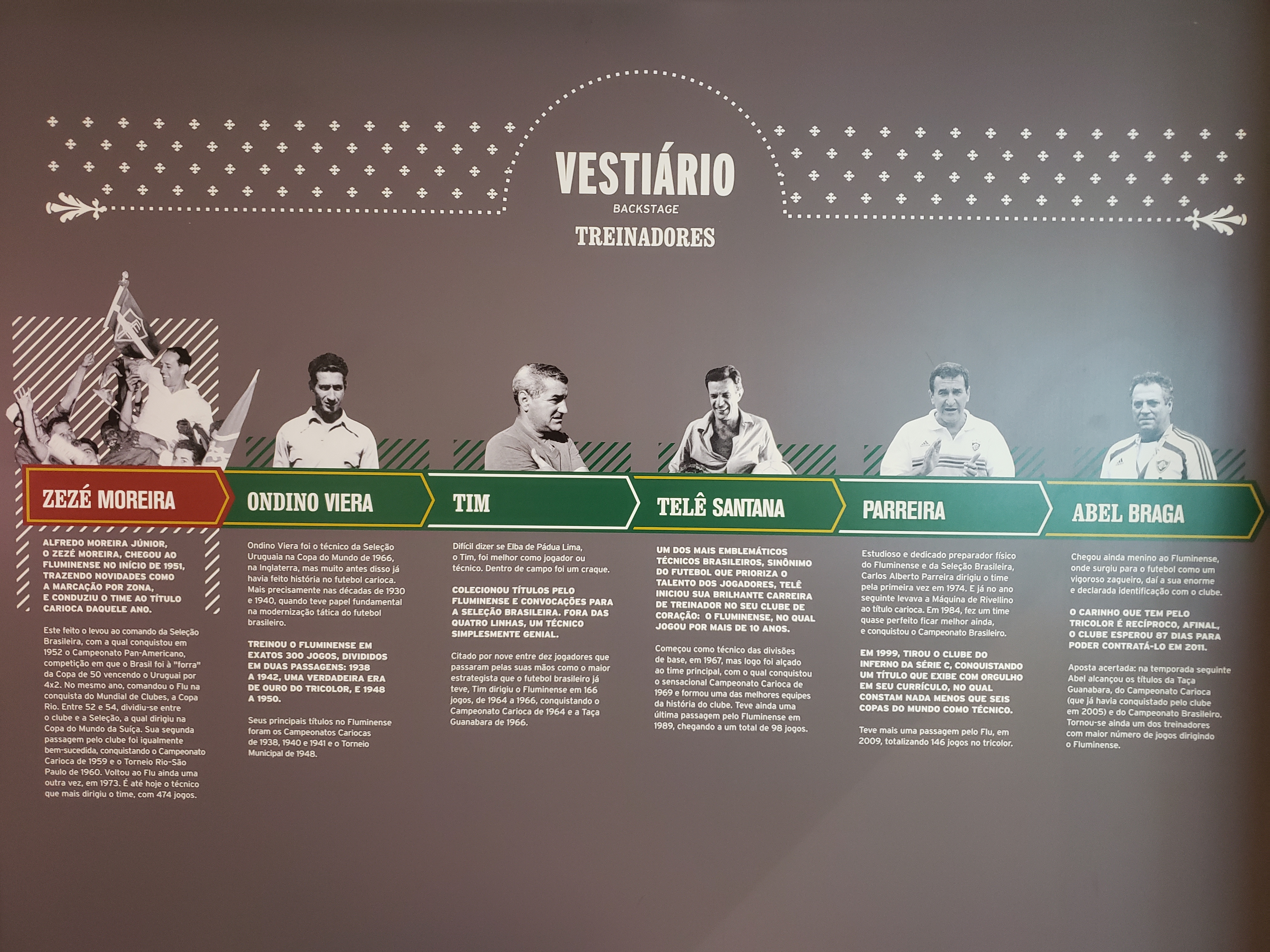
Coaches featured at the Club Trophy Room

Name		Matches
1st	(Brazil) Zezé Moreira	467
2nd	(Brazil) Abel Braga	354
3rd	(Uruguay) Ondino Viera	300
4th	(Brazil) Renato Gaúcho	238
5th	(Brazil) Fernando Diniz	188
6th	(Brazil) Tim	166
7th	(Brazil) Nelsinho Rosa	156
8th	(Brazil) Carlos Alberto Parreira	146
9th	(Brazil) Sylvio Pirillo	138
10th	(Brazil) Luís Vinhaes	137

Correct as of June 25, 2025

== Sponsors ==
Companies that Fluminense Football Club has had sponsorship deals with include:

=== Main sponsor ===
Years	Sponsor(s)
1999–2014	(Brazil) Unimed
2017	(United States) Universal Orlando Resort
2018	(Brazil) Valle Express
2021–2024	(Greece) Betano
2024–	(Romania) Superbet

== Stadiums ==
=== Laranjeiras Stadium ===
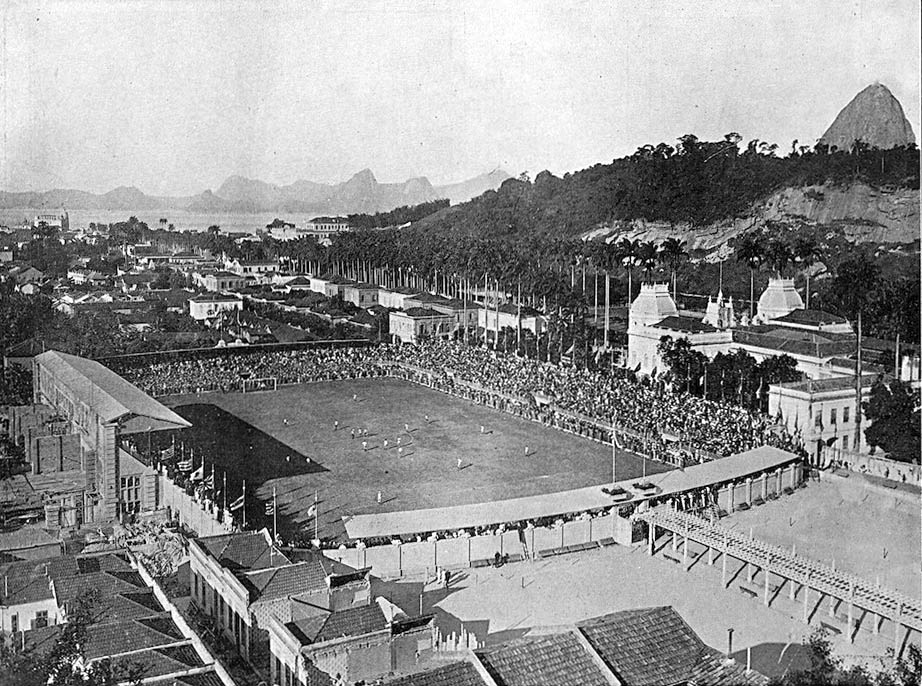
Laranjeiras Stadium, in 1919.

The Manoel Schwartz Stadium is better known as the Laranjeiras Stadium, or also the Álvaro Chaves Street Stadium, due to the name of the street where its main entrance is located. It was the place where the Rio team played its games for decades, however, for security reasons, due to the high demand for attendance at its games, it no longer does so, currently playing at Maracanã.

Flu's first match at the Laranjeiras Stadium was the 4–1 victory over Vila Isabel, in the 1919 Carioca Championship, with the Tricolor goals having been scored by Harry Welfare (3) and Machado. Opened in 1919 with a capacity for 18,000 people and having had its capacity expanded to 25,000 people since 1922, in some games this stadium had estimated audiences greater than its capacity.

The record for paying audiences was in the Fluminense 3-1 Flamengo match, on 14 June 1925, when 25,718 spectators paid for tickets, although today the audience for Fluminense's match against Sporting, held on 15 July, is unknown. In 1928, in the Vulcain Cup dispute, with the stadium full and over 2,000 chairs being placed on the athletics track to accommodate the public present.

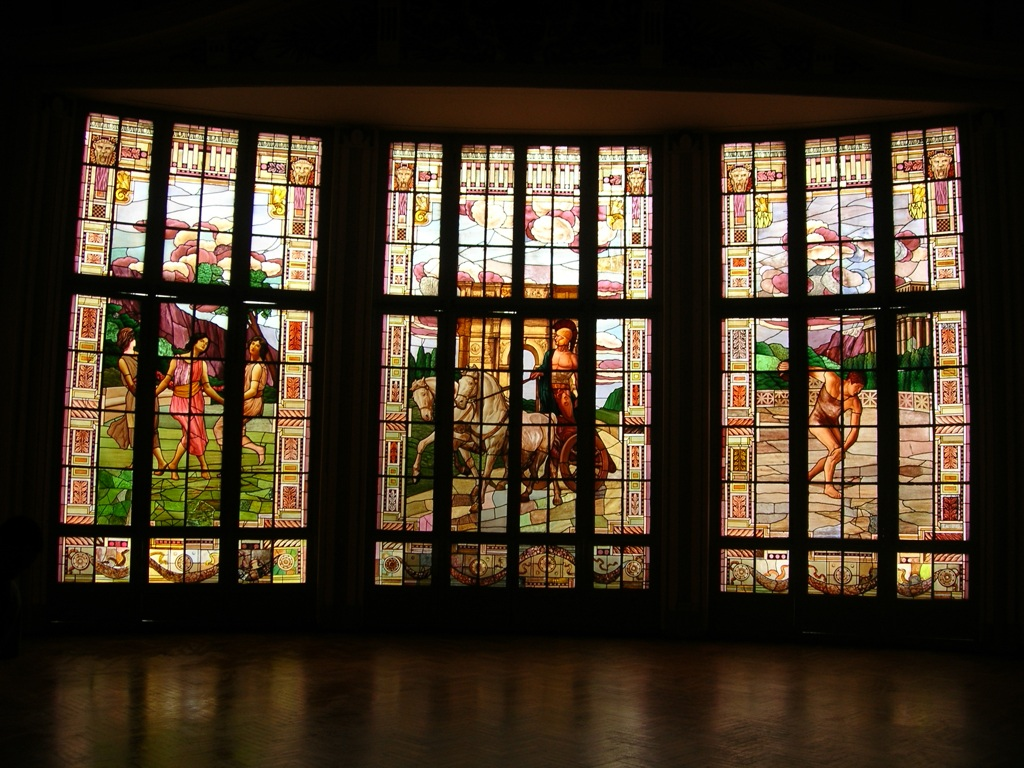
Stained glass windows in Fluminense's headquarters

Currently, Fluminense does not play its games at its stadium, at the club's option, as it would no longer have the security conditions and capacity to host large events, and is currently only used for training, small commemorative events, social and educational projects, games of the women's football team and the youth teams. The last time an official match for Fluminense's main team took place at Laranjeiras Stadium was in 2003, where Flu drew 3–3 with Americano, in the Carioca Championship.

The renovation of the stadium has been a long-standing demand of the club, however a series of problems make this difficult, such as technical issues linked to the historical preservation of the building, the small area for the construction of a modern stadium and the opposition of the surrounding residents. The current project, at a more advanced stage, foresees a revitalization of Laranjeiras, with the stadium remaining with a small audience capacity, being able to host lower demand games, such as the first phases of the state championship and women's football.

=== Maracanã Stadium ===
Since its construction for the 1950 World Cup, the Maracanã has primarily served as the home ground for the four biggest Rio de Janeiro clubs. The stadium was officially completed in 1965, 17 years after construction began. In 1963, more than 194,000 people attended a match between Flamengo and Fluminense at the Maracanã, Rio Championship final.

At the stadium, Fluminense won some of the most important titles, such as the 1952 Copa Rio, for many the most important in its history, it won its first Brazilian Championship in 1970, the Tricolor Machine was twice champion of Carioca (1975–76), led by Roberto Rivellino, it was Brazilian champion over its rival Vasco da Gama, in 1984, was three-time Rio champion against Flamengo (1983–85), he was Carioca champion in 1995 with Renato Gaúcho's belly goal, against Romário's Flamengo (at the time named FIFA World Player of the Year). In this century he won the 2007 Copa do Brasil and the 2023 Copa Libertadores.

Following its 50th anniversary and aiming to hold the 2000 FIFA Club World Cup in Brazil, the stadium underwent renovations which would increase its full capacity to around 103,000. After years of planning and nine months of closure between 2005 and 2006, the stadium was reopened in January 2007 with an all-seated capacity of 87,000. For the 2014 FIFA World Cup and the 2016 Olympics and Paralympics, a major expedition project was started in 2010. The original stand, with a two-level configuration, was demolished, making way for a new single-level stand, and the stadium had its capacity reduced to 78,838 seats.

From 2013 onwards, the stadium was managed by the Brazilian conglomerate Odebrecht. Corruption scandals, the high rents charged by the company and the abandonment of the stadium, meant that Flamengo and Fluminense came together to manage it. Although clubs have kept the stadium in good condition since 2016 and covered its maintenance costs, it was only in 2019 that the government canceled contracts with Odebrecht. Flamengo and Fluminense then created a joint company, "Fla-Flu S.A." opened especially to manage Maracanã and its entire sports complex.

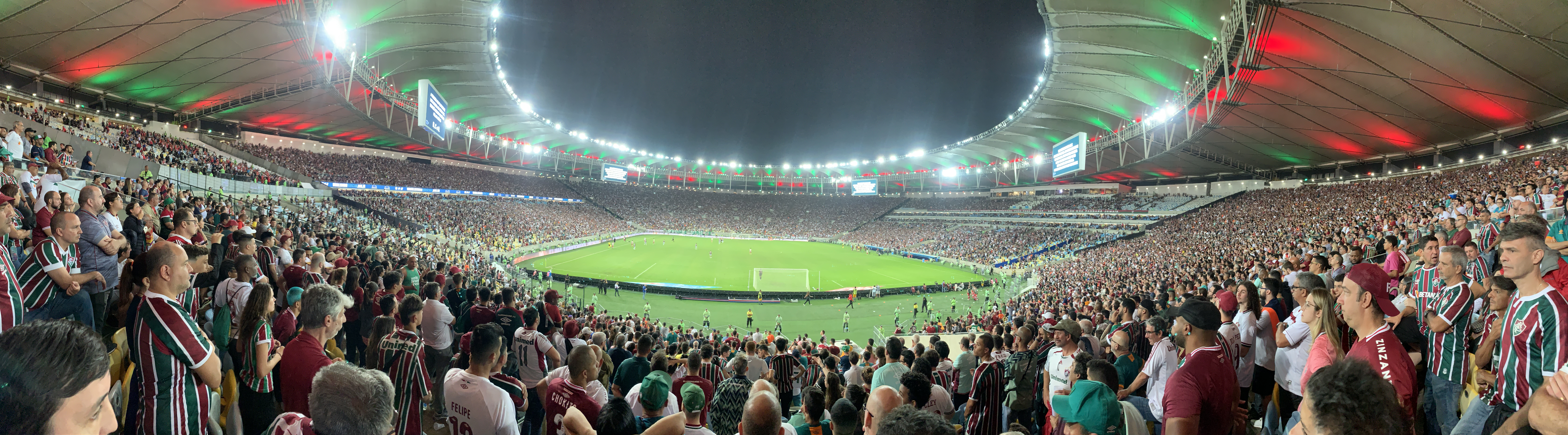
Fluminense supporters, at the Maracanã Stadium, during the match between Fluminense and Argentinos Juniors, in the round of 16 of the 2023 Copa Libertadores.

== Players ==
=== Current squad ===
As of 22 September 2026

Note: Flags indicate national team as defined under FIFA eligibility rules; some limited exceptions apply. Players may hold more than one non-FIFA nationality.

No.	Pos.	Nation	Player
1	GK	BRA	Fábio (vice-captain)
2	DF	BRA	Samuel Xavier (2nd vice-captain)
3	DF	BRA	Thiago Silva (captain)
4	DF	BRA	Ignácio
6	DF	BRA	Renê
7	FW	BRA	Hulk
8	MF	BRA	Matheus Martinelli
9	FW	BRA	John Kennedy
10	MF	BRA	Ganso
11	MF	VEN	Jefferson Savarino
13	DF	BRA	Guilherme Arana
14	FW	ARG	Germán Cano
16	MF	BRA	Nonato
17	FW	URU	Agustín Canobbio
19	FW	ARG	Rodrigo Castillo

No.	Pos.	Nation	Player
21	DF	BRA	Igor Rabello
22	DF	ARG	Juan Pablo Freytes
23	DF	BRA	Guga
25	MF	BRA	Alisson (on loan from São Paulo)
27	GK	BRA	Marcelo Pitaluga
28	FW	BRA	Riquelme
29	DF	COL	Julián Millán
30	FW	VEN	Yeferson Soteldo
32	MF	ARG	Lucho Acosta
35	MF	BRA	Hércules
44	DF	BRA	Jemmes
46	DF	BRA	Júlio Fidelis
90	FW	COL	Kevin Serna
94	MF	BRA	Otávio
98	GK	BRA	Vitor Eudes

=== Reserve team ===
Note: Flags indicate national team as defined under FIFA eligibility rules; some limited exceptions apply. Players may hold more than one non-FIFA nationality.

No.	Pos.	Nation	Player
15	FW	MEX	Matheus Reis
34	MF	BRA	Wesley Natã
36	DF	BRA	Vagno
39	FW	BRA	Keven Samuel

No.	Pos.	Nation	Player
41	MF	BRA	Ruan Sales
50	GK	BRA	Lucas Emanuel
52	DF	BRA	Breno Britez
58	MF	BRA	Naarã

=== Other players under contract ===
Note: Flags indicate national team as defined under FIFA eligibility rules; some limited exceptions apply. Players may hold more than one non-FIFA nationality.

No.	Pos.	Nation	Player
—	DF	BRA	Léo Jance

=== Out on loan ===
Note: Flags indicate national team as defined under FIFA eligibility rules; some limited exceptions apply. Players may hold more than one non-FIFA nationality.

No.	Pos.	Nation	Player
—	DF	BRA	Kayky Almeida (on loan at Sport Recife until 30 November 2026)
—	DF	COL	Gabriel Fuentes (on loan at Fortaleza until 31 December 2026)
—	DF	BRA	Gustavo Cintra (on loan at Itabaiana until 30 November 2026)
—	DF	BRA	João Loiola (on loan at New York City FC II until 31 December 2026)
—	DF	BRA	Lucas Justen (on loan at Ponte Preta until 30 November 2026)
—	MF	BRA	Freitas (on loan at Remo until 31 December 2026)
—	DF	BRA	Miguel Sampaio (on loan at Inter de Limeira until 30 November 2026)
—	MF	PAR	Rubén Lezcano (on loan at Olimpia until 31 December 2026)
—	MF	BRA	Lima (on loan at Santos until 31 December 2026)

No.	Pos.	Nation	Player
—	MF	BRA	Luis Fernando (on loan at Caxias until 30 November 2026)
—	MF	URU	David Terans (on loan at Atlético Goianiense until 30 November 2026)
—	FW	BRA	Everaldo (on loan at Bahia until 31 December 2026)
—	FW	BRA	Keno (on loan at Coritiba until 31 December 2026)
—	FW	URU	Joaquín Lavega (on loan at Coritiba until 31 December 2026)
—	FW	BRA	Lelê (on loan at Pafos until 30 June 2027)
—	FW	COL	Santi Moreno (on loan at Dallas until 31 December 2026)
—	FW	BRA	João Neto (on loan at CRB until 30 November 2026)
—	FW	BRA	Marlon (on loan at Juazeirense until 30 November 2026)

== Staff ==
=== Current staff ===
Position	Name	Nationality
Head coach	Vacant	
Assistant coaches	Maxi Cuberas	Argentine
Assistant coaches	Carlos Gruezo	Argentine
Assistant coaches	Marcão	Brazilian
Assistant coaches	Alejandro Escobar	Argentine
Assistant coaches	Cadu Antunes	Brazilian
Technical assistant	Marco Salgado	Brazilian
Fitness coaches	Lucas Vivas	Argentine
Fitness coaches	Ricardo Henriques	Brazilian
Fitness coaches	Flávio Vignoli	Brazilian
Fitness coaches	Igor Cotrim	Brazilian
Goalkeeper coach coordinator	Flavio Tenius	Brazilian
Goalkeeper coaches	André Carvalho	Brazilian
Goalkeeper coaches	Josmiro de Góes	Brazilian

== Head coaches ==
- Ground Committeé (1902–10)
- (England) Charlie Williams (1911–12)
- Ground Committeé (1913–16)
- (England) Quincey Taylor (1917–18)
- (Uruguay) Ramón Platero (1919)
- (Denmark) Pode Pedersen (1920–23)
- (England) Charlie Williams (1924–26)
- (Hungary) Eugênio Medgyessy (1927–28)
- (Brazil) Luiz Vinhaes (1929–33)
- (England) Quincey Taylor (1934–36)
- (Uruguay) Héctor Cabelli (1936)
- (Uruguay) Carlos Carlomagno (1936–38)
- (Brazil) Carlos Nascimento (1938)
- (Uruguay) Ondino Viera (1938–43)
- (Uruguay) Athuel Velázquez (1943–1944)
- (Uruguay) Humberto Cabelli (1944–1945)
- (Brazil) Gentil Cardoso (1945–47)
- (Uruguay) Ondino Viera (1948–50)
- (Brazil) Otto Vieira (1950–51)
- (Brazil) Zezé Moreira (1951–54)
- (Brazil) Gradim (1955–56)
- (Brazil) Sylvio Pirillo (1956–58)
- (Brazil) Zezé Moreira (1958–62)
- (Paraguay) Fleitas Solich (1963–64)
- (Brazil) Tim (1964–67)
- (Brazil) Telê Santana (1967–68)
- (Brazil) Evaristo de Macedo (1968)
- (Brazil) Telê Santana (1969–70)
- (Brazil) Paulo Amaral (1970)
- (Brazil) Mário Zagallo (1971–72)
- (Brazil) Zezé Moreira (1973)
- (Brazil) Duque (1973–74)
- (Brazil) Carlos Alberto Parreira (1974)
- (Brazil) Paulo Emilio (1975)
- (Brazil) Didi (1975–76)
- (Brazil) Mário Travaglini (1976–77)
- (Brazil) Pinheiro (1977)
- (Brazil) Paulo Emilio (1978)
- (Brazil) Nelsinho Rosa (1979–81)
- (Brazil) Dino Sani (1981–82)
- (Brazil) Lula (1982)
- (Brazil) Cláudio Garcia (1983)
- (Brazil) José Luiz Carbone (1983–84)
- (Brazil) Carlos Alberto Parreira (1984–85)
- (Argentina) José Omar Pastoriza (1985)
- (Brazil) Nelsinho Rosa (1985–86)
- (Brazil) Antônio Lopes (1986–87)
- (Brazil) José Luiz Carbone (1987)
- (Brazil) Ismael Kurtz (1988)
- (Brazil) Sérgio Cosme (1988–89)
- (Brazil) Procópio Cardoso (1989)
- (Brazil) Paulo Emilio (1990)
- (Brazil) Gílson Nunes (1990–91)
- (Brazil) Edinho (1991)
- (Brazil) Arthur Bernardes (1992)
- (Brazil) Nelsinho Rosa (1993)
- (Brazil) Delei (1994)
- (Brazil) Pinheiro (1994)
- (Brazil) Joel Santana (1995)
- (Brazil) Jair Pereira (1996)
- (Brazil) Renato Portaluppi (1996)
- (Brazil) Júlio César Leal (1997)
- (Brazil) Valdir Espinosa (1997)
- (Uruguay) Hugo de León (1997)
- (Brazil) José Luiz Carbone (1997)
- (Brazil) Arturzinho (1997)
- (Brazil) Edinho (1998)
- (Brazil) Delei (1998)
- (Brazil) Sérgio Cosme (1998)
- (Brazil) Carlos Alberto Parreira (1999–00)
- (Brazil) Valdir Espinosa (2000–01)
- (Brazil) Oswaldo de Oliveira (2001–02)
- (Brazil) Renato Portaluppi (2 September 2002 – 11 July 2003)
- (Brazil) Joel Santana (18 July 2003 1 October 2003)
- (Brazil) Renato Portaluppi (1 October 2003 – 28 December 2003)
- (Brazil) Ricardo Gomes (4 March 2004 – 15 August 2004)
- (Brazil) Alexandre Gama(16 August 2004 - 31 December 2004)
- (Brazil) Abel Braga (1 January 2005 – 10 December 2005)
- (Brazil) Ivo Wortmann (11 December 2005 – 19 February 2006)
- (Brazil) Paulo Campos (22 February 2006 – 12 March 2006)
- (Brazil) Oswaldo de Oliveira (2006)
- (Brazil) Antônio Lopes (23 August 2006 – 29 September 2006)
- (Brazil) PC Gusmão (29 September 2006 – 11 February 2007)
- (Brazil) Renato Portaluppi (24 April 2007 – 10 August 2008)
- (Brazil) Cuca (11 August 2008 – 2 October 2008)
- (Brazil) Renê Simões (2 October 2008 – 6 March 2009)
- (Brazil) Carlos Alberto Parreira (7 March 2009 – 13 July 2009)
- (Brazil) Vinícius Eutrópio (14 July 2009 – 19 July 2009)
- (Brazil) Renato Portaluppi (20 July 2009 – 1 September 2009)
- (Brazil) Cuca (1 September 2009 – 19 April 2010)
- (Brazil) Muricy Ramalho (25 April 2010 – 13 March 2011)
- (Brazil) Enderson Moreira (int.) (21 March 2011 – 31 May 2011)
- (Brazil) Abel Braga (8 June 2011 – 29 July 2013)
- (Brazil) Vanderlei Luxemburgo (30 July 2013 – 12 November 2013)
- (Brazil) Dorival Júnior (12 November 2013 – 26 December 2013)
- (Brazil) Renato Portaluppi (28 December 2013 – 2 April 2014)
- (Brazil) Cristóvão Borges (2 April 2014 – 23 March 2015)
- (Brazil) Ricardo Drubscky (23 March – 17 May 2015)
- (Brazil) Enderson Moreira (18 May 2015 – 16 September 2015)
- (Brazil) Eduardo Baptista (17 September 2015 – 25 February 2016)
- (Brazil) Levir Culpi (4 March 2016 – 6 November 2016)
- (Brazil) Marcão (6 November 2016 – 1 December 2016)
- (Brazil) Abel Braga (1 December 2016 – June 2018)
- (Brazil) Marcelo Oliveira (June 2018 - 29 November 2018)
- (Brazil) Fábio Moreno (last game in Brazilian Championship)
- (Brazil) Fernando Diniz (2018–2019)
- (Brazil) Marcão (one game)
- (Brazil) Oswaldo de Oliveira (2019)
- (Brazil) Marcão (2019)
- (Brazil) Odair Hellmann (2020)
- (Brazil) Marcão (2020–2021)
- (Brazil) Roger Machado (2021)
- (Brazil) Marcão (2021)
- (Brazil) Abel Braga (2022 – 30 April 2022)
- (Brazil) Fernando Diniz (1 May 2022 – 24 June 2024)
- (Brazil) Marcão (24 June 2024 – 1 July 2024)
- (Brazil) Mano Menezes (1 July 2024 – 30 March 2025)
- (Brazil) Renato Portaluppi (3 April 2025 - 23 September 2025)
- (Argentina) Luis Zubeldía (26 September 2025 - 13 August 2026)

== See also ==
- Fluminense FC (women)
- 2008 Fluminense Football Club season
