= Delei =

Brazilian footballer and manager (born 1959)

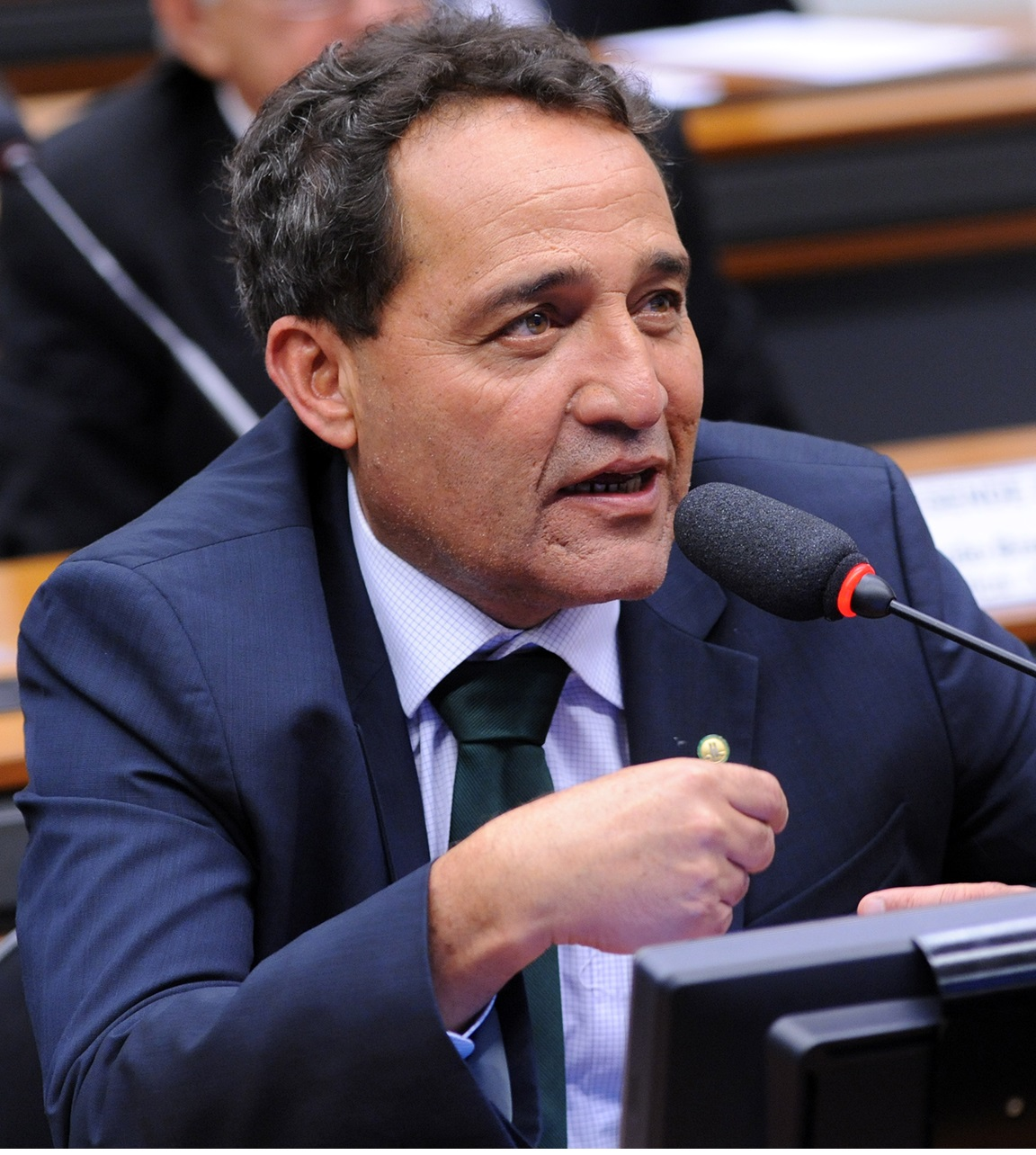
- Delei in october 2015

Personal information
- Full name: Wanderley Alves de Oliveira
- Date of birth: August 28, 1959 (age 67)
- Place of birth: Volta Redonda, Brazil
- Height: 1.73 m (5 ft 8 in)
- Position: Midfielder

Senior career*
Years	Team	Apps	(Gls)
1979–1986	Fluminense	88	(8)
1987	Palmeiras	1	(0)
1988	Botafogo	6	(0)
1989	Belenenses	?	(?)
1990	Atlético-PR	2	(0)

International career
1979	Brazil Olympic team	7	(2)
1984	Brazil	1	(0)

Managerial career
- 1994: Fluminense
- 1998: Fluminense
- * Club domestic league appearances and goals

Wanderley Alves de Oliveira, also known by the nickname Delei (born August 28, 1959), is a former Brazilian football (soccer) player who played for several Campeonato Brasileiro Série A clubs. He also played for the Brazil national team and worked as a head coach.

== Playing career ==
Born in Volta Redonda, Rio de Janeiro state, Delei started his professional career in 1979, playing for Fluminense. During his spell at the club, he won the Campeonato Carioca in 1980, 1983, 1984 and in 1985, and won the Campeonato Brasileiro Série A in 1984, having played 88 Série A games, scoring eight goals. He joined Palmeiras in 1987, playing one Série A game for the club, but playing 23 games overall, without scoring a goal. After leaving Palmeiras, Delei moved to Botafogo in 1988, playing six Série A games during that year. He played in Portugal in 1989, defending Belenenses, returning to Brazil in the subsequent year, when he joined Atlético Paranaense, playing two Série games before retiring.

=== National team ===
He played seven games for the Brazilian Olympic team in 1979, scoring two goals. Delei played once for the Brazilian main team, on June 21, 1984, against Uruguay, won by his country 1–0.

== Coaching career ==
Delei was Fluminense's head coach twice. The first spell was in 1994, while the second one was in 1998.
