= Troféu Osmar Santos =

Troféu Osmar Santos is an award given by the Brazilian newspaper Lance! to the winner of the first turn of the Série A. The trophy honors Osmar Santos, who is a former sports commentator. The award was created in 2004.

== Winners ==
Year	Winner
2004	Santos
2005	Corinthians
2006	São Paulo
2007	São Paulo
2008	Grêmio
2009	Internacional
2010	Fluminense
2011	Corinthians
2012	Atlético Mineiro
2013	Cruzeiro
2014	Cruzeiro
2015	Corinthians
2016	Palmeiras
2017	Corinthians
2018	São Paulo
2019	Flamengo
2020	São Paulo
2021	Atlético Mineiro
2022	Palmeiras
2023	Botafogo
2024	Botafogo
2025	Flamengo

== Titles by team ==
Club	Titles
(São Paulo (state)) Corinthians	4 (2005, 2011, 2015, 2017)
(São Paulo (state)) São Paulo	4 (2006, 2007, 2018, 2020)
(Minas Gerais) Cruzeiro	2 (2013, 2014)
(Minas Gerais) Atlético Mineiro	2 (2012, 2021)
(São Paulo (state)) Palmeiras	2 (2016, 2022)
(Rio de Janeiro (state)) Botafogo	2 (2023, 2024)
(Rio de Janeiro (state)) Flamengo	2 (2019, 2025)
(Rio de Janeiro (state)) Fluminense	1 (2010)
(Rio Grande do Sul) Grêmio	1 (2008)
(Rio Grande do Sul) Internacional	1 (2009)
(São Paulo (state)) Santos	1 (2004)

== See also ==
- Troféu João Saldanha
