= Paulo Emilio (footballer, born 1936) =

Brazilian football manager (1936–2016)

Personal information
- Full name: Paulo Emilio Frossard Jorge
- Date of birth: 3 January 1936
- Place of birth: Espera Feliz, Brazil
- Date of death: 17 May 2016 (aged 80)
- Place of death: São José dos Campos, Brazil

Managerial career
- Years: Team
- 1962: Portuguesa
- 1963–1965: Ypiranga
- 1965–1967: Vitória
- 1967: Desportiva
- 1968: Desportiva
- 1969–1971: America
- 1972: Nacional de Manaus
- 1973: Santa Cruz
- 1974: Remo
- 1974: Bahia
- 1975: Fluminense
- 1975: Santa Cruz
- 1976: Vasco da Gama
- 1977: Guarani
- 1977–1978: Sporting
- 1978: Goiás
- 1978: Fluminense
- 1979: Paysandu
- 1980: Santa Cruz
- 1980: Botafogo
- 1981: Goiás
- 1981: Náutico
- 1982: Santos
- 1982–1988: Fortaleza
- 1989: São José (SP)
- 1990: Fluminense
- 1991: Noroeste
- 1991–1992: Al-Hilal
- 1993: Botafogo
- 1993: Atlético Paranaense
- 1994–1995: Cerezo Osaka

Paulo Emilio Frossard Jorge (3 January 1936 – 17 May 2016) was a Brazilian football manager. He died aged 80 of a brain lymphoma in May 2016.

== Managerial statistics ==
Team	From	To	Record				
Team	From	To	G	W	D	L	Win %
Cerezo Osaka	1 January 1994	31 December 1995	67	30	0	37	44.78
Total			67	30	0	37	44.78

== Honours ==
=== Manager ===
Desportiva

- Campeonato Capixaba: 1967
- Torneio Início do Espírito Santo: 1967
- Taça Cidade de Vitória: 1968

Nacional-AM

- Campeonato Amazonense: 1972

Santa Cruz

- Campeonato Pernambucano: 1973

Bahia

- Campeonato Baiano: 1974

Fluminense

- Campeonato Carioca: 1975
- Taça Guanabara: 1975
- Taça Rio: 1990

Vasco da Gama

- Taça Guanabara: 1976

Sporting

- Taça de Portugal: 1977-78

Goiás

- Campeonato Goiano: 1981

Fortaleza

- Campeonato Cearense: 1983

Cerezo Osaka

- Japan Football League: 1994
