= Lance! =

Daily sports newspaper in Brazil

- Logo of Lance!
- Type: National daily sports newspaper
- Format: Tabloid
- Publisher: Areté Editorial S/A
- Editor: Walter de Mattos Júnior
- Founded: 26 October 1997
- Ceased publication: 22 March 2020 (print)
- Language: Portuguese
- Headquarters: Rua Santa Maria, 47, Bairro Cidade Nova, CEP: 20211210, Rio de Janeiro, RJ, Brazil
- Circulation: 80,238 (2012)
- Website: www.lancenet.com.br

Lance! is a daily sports newspaper in Brazil, and its first edition was published in 1997. Its headquarters are located in Rio de Janeiro, and they print regional versions for some of the other Brazilian states.

== History ==
Its tabloid format as well as its news design quickly became a success, and Lance! is also popular among Brazilian TV and radio sports journalists and reporters.

Its 3000th edition was published on 29 January 2006. There are Lance! offices in Rio de Janeiro, São Paulo and Belo Horizonte, and they also publish regional versions in Curitiba and Manaus.

The Marplan Institute reported two million readers in July 2009, along with 9.2 million unique users on the website in the same month. According to the Brazilian Circulation Verifying Institute (Instituto Verificador de Circulação), Lance! has the highest newsstand sales in the state of São Paulo. Also in July 2009, the newspaper increased its cover price from R$1.25 to R$1.50, committing to print four additional pages.

On 30 October 2007, to mark the newspaper’s tenth anniversary, a special edition was released featuring testimonials from major figures in politics and sports, with a print run of one million copies. At that time, Lance! had reached the tenth position in circulation among Brazilian newspapers.

In 2010, it won the Journalism Print category of the 2nd Brazil Sports and Social Inclusion Award for the reporting series "Torcedor diferenciado" ("Different Fan"), which portrayed the experience of four disabled individuals attending football matches in Rio de Janeiro. The series was published in September 2009 and authored by reporter Erich Onida.

Lance! also issues a weekly magazine called Lance! A+; its first edition was published in 2000.

On 21 March 2020, the newspaper announced it ceased the publication due to the COVID-19 pandemic.

== Trophies ==
The newspaper awards the winner of the first turn of the Série A with the Troféu Osmar Santos, while the second turn winner is awarded with the Troféu João Saldanha.
