= Rato Castelli =

Brazilian footballer

Rato
Personal information
- Full name: José Castelli
- Date of birth: 19 August 1904
- Place of birth: São Paulo, Brazil
- Date of death: 26 September 1984 (aged 80)
- Place of death: São Paulo, Brazil
- Positions: Midfielder; forward

Senior career*
| Years | Team | Apps | (Gls) |
| 1921–1931 | Corinthians | | |
| 1931–1934 | Lazio | | |
| 1934–1937 | Corinthians | | |
| 1937 | Portuguesa Santista | | |

Managerial career
- 1937: Corinthians
- 1942–1943: Corinthians
- 1951–1954: Corinthians
- 1951–1954: Corinthians
- 1958: Corinthians (caretaker)
- 1959: Corinthians (caretaker)
- 1960: Corinthians (caretaker)
- 1961: Corinthians (caretaker)
- 1962: Corinthians (caretaker)
- 1963: Corinthians (caretaker)
- * Club domestic league appearances and goals as of 22 May 2024

José Castelli (19 August 1904 – 26 September 1984), better known as Rato or Rato Castelli, was a Brazilian professional footballer and manager, who played as a midfielder and forward.

== Career ==
Known as the "Rei do Drible" (English: King of Dribble), Rato Castelli played for Corinthians from 1921 to 1931, being state champion several times. Played as a midfielder and forward on the left side, in 1931, Rato is hired by S.S. Lazio alongside Filó, Armando Del Debbio and Alexandre De Maria. He returned to Corinthians in 1934 where he played until 1937, making a total of 213 appearances and scoring 67 goals, and ended his career at Portuguesa Santista.

== Managerial career ==
Rato had his first experience as a coach in 1937, shortly after retiring. He managed Corinthians on several occasions, with emphasis on the state championships in 1951 and 1952, and Rio-São Paulo in 1953. He was also interim and coach of the youth sectors

== Honours ==
=== Player ===
Corinthians

- Campeonato Paulista: 1922, 1923, 1924, 1928, 1929, 1930
- Taça Competência: 1922, 1923, 1924
- Taça dos Campeões Estaduais Rio-São Paulo: 1929

=== Manager ===
Corinthians

- Campeonato Paulista: 1951, 1952
- Torneio Rio-São Paulo: 1953
