= Rubens Salles =

Argentine footballer (1891–1945)

Personal information
- Full name: Rubens de Morais Salles
- Date of birth: 14 October 1891
- Place of birth: São Manuel, Brazil
- Date of death: 21 July 1934 (aged 42)
- Place of death: São Paulo, Brazil
- Position: Midfielder

Senior career*
Years	Team	Apps	(Gls)
1906–1921	Paulistano		

International career
1914	Brazil	1	(1)

Managerial career
- 1914: Brazil
- 1930: São Paulo
- 1931–1932: São Paulo
- * Club domestic league appearances and goals

Rubens Salles (14 October 1891 – 21 July 1934) was a Brazilian football player and manager, who played as a midfielder.

== Playing career ==
Rubens Salles began his career at CA Paulistano in 1906. He became one of the club's biggest names in the 1910s, alongside Arthur Friedenreich. He won the state championship on six occasions, being one of the top scorers in the 1910 edition. He stood out for his goals from outside the box, in addition to long-distance ball passes.

== International career ==
Rubens Salles played in four matches for the Brazil national team: the first in history, against Exeter City, 21 July 1914, and against Argentine clubs Columbian FC and Sportivo Barracas.

On 27 September 1914 Salles scored the first official goal of Brazil, against Argentina.

== Managerial career ==
Rubens Salles was the first coach in the history of São Paulo FC, having led the club in 1930 and 1931, when he won the club's first state title.

== Personal life and death ==
Rubens was brother of Fernão Salles, one of the conflagrants of Constitutionalist Revolution.

He died 21 July 1934, in São Paulo, aged 42. When he died he left behind his wife Maria Prado de Almeida Salles and their minor daughters Maria Lina and Helena.

== Honours ==
=== Player ===
Paulsitano

- Campeonato Paulista: 1908, 1913, 1916, 1917, 1918, 1919
- Taça Ioduran: 1918

Brazil

- Copa Roca: 1914

Individual

- 1910 Campeonato Paulista top scorer: 10 goals

=== Manager ===
São Paulo

- Campeonato Paulista: 1931
