= History of Santos FC (1912–1935) =

Brazilian football club history

The history of Santos Futebol Clube goes from the football club's founding in 1912 and up to current time. Santos FC, also known simply as "Santos" and familiarly as "Peixe", is based in Santos, São Paulo, Brazil. The team was founded on April 14, 1912, by the initiative of three sports enthusiasts from Santos: Raimundo Marques, Mário Ferraz de Campos, and Argemiro de Souza Júnior. In 1962, the club participated in their first of many South American competitions, and has since amassed seven CONMEBOL trophies and a quadruple. In 1971, Santos co-founded the Campeonato Brasileiro Série A, the top-tier in Brazil football, along with a string of other clubs.

== Birth of Santos Foot-ball Clube (1912) ==
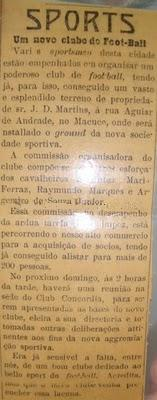
Mário Ferraz de Campos' advertisement in Diário de Santos, referring to the creation of a new football club in Brazil.

Football was introduced to Brazil by a Scottish expatriate named Thomas Donohue, with the first football match played in Brazil in April 1894, played on a pitch marked out by Donohue next to his workplace in Bangu. In the 1870s, like many other British workers, a Scottish expatriate named John Miller, worked on the railway construction project in São Paulo with other European immigrants. In 1884, Miller sent his 10-year-old son Charles William Miller to Bannister School in Southampton, England to be educated. Charles was a skilled athlete who quickly picked up the game of football at the time when the Football League was still being formed, and as an accomplished winger and striker Charles held school honours that gained him entry into the Southampton Football Club team, and later into the County team of Hampshire. On his return to Brazil, Charles brought two footballs and a set of Hampshire FA rules in his suitcase. He then taught the rules of the game to players in São Paulo.

"SPORTS. A new football club. Several sportsmen of this city are committed to organize a powerful football club, having already bought a vast and splendid land owned by Mr. J.D. Martins, by the Andrade Aguiar street in Macuco, where the playing field will be installed for the new sport club. The club organizing committee is composed by the following three hard-working gentlemen: Mario Ferraz de Campos, Raymundo Marques and Argemiro de Souza Júnior. This committee, carrying out this arduously-required task, is relying on our great commerce for the acquisition of associates, having already achieved to enlist more than 200 people. Next Sunday, at 2 pm, there will be a meeting at the Concordia Club, where the basis of the new club shall be presented, elect its boardmembers and make other decisions for the purposes of the new sport club. It is sensible for the lack, among us, of a good club dedicated to the beautiful sport of football. We believe that the new club will fill that gap."

— Diario do Santos, 1912

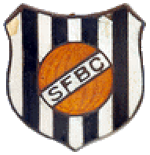
The first Santos FC emblem, 1912

Henrique Porchat de Assis introduced football to the city of Santos at the Instituto Presbiteriano Mackenzie. Although water sports such as rowing were the most practiced activity by the city's youth, the introduction of football by Porchat de Assis quickly became the top event in Santos. Santos was growing in wealth, with its port growing as one of the largest in the world with coffee, a major product in those times, being the most exported product. Combined with plans from the city of to form a statewide competition, the socialites of Santos created two football clubs to represent them: Clube Atlético Internacional and Sport Club Americano. The first football match in Santos was played on November 1, 1902, with Porchat de Assis as one of the spectators. However, Atlético Internacional dissolved in 1910 due to growing debts and extremely poor results which included not scoring a single goal during the 1908 season. With the Serra do Mar, a 1,500 km long system of mountain ranges and escarpments in Southeastern Brazil, separating São Paulo and Santos by 76 km, Americano found participating in the Paulista tournament a long and expensive journey. This prompted the club members to move the club to the city of São Paulo. This left Santos with no representatives left, which many Santistas, particularly the city students, being left dissatisfied at this turn of events. A meeting to create a football team was advertised to take place at the headquarters of the Concordia Club (located in Rosario Street No. 18, at the top of the old bakery and Switzerland confectionery, currently Avenida João Pessoa) The meeting, which lasted 14 hours, was spearheaded by three sportsmen from the city: Raymundo Marques Francisco, Mário Ferraz de Campos and Argemiro de Souza Junior. During the meeting, there was doubt as to the name that should be given to the club. Several suggestions emerged: África Futebol Clube, Associação Esportiva Brasil, Concórdia Futebol Clube, among others. But the participants hailed unanimously at the proposal of Edmundo Jorge de Araujo: Santos Foot-Ball Club. Thus, the club was formally born at 2:00 pm on April 14, 1912, 12 hours and 20 minutes before the Titanic would sink into the Atlantic Ocean. The club's first president was Sizino Patuska (who had participated in the founding of Atlético Internacional and was the founder of Americano). The first field for Santos was the Campo da Ana Costa, Atlético Internacional's former playing field.

== The first years (1913-1917) ==
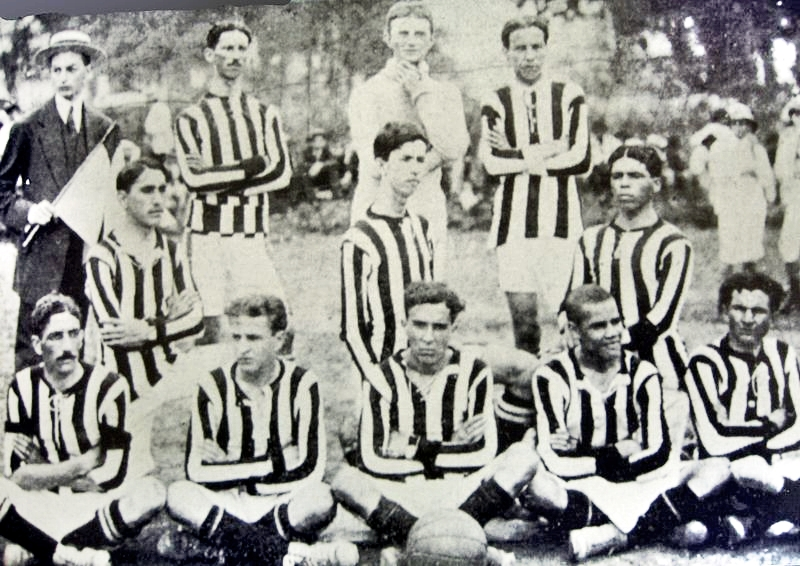
Santos FC team of 1913

The first game took place on June 23, 1912, against a local opponent named Thereza Team which Santos won 2–1, with goals scored by Anacleto Ferramenta and Geraule Ribeiro. Santos formation then was Fauvel, Simon, Ari, Bandeira, Ambrósio, Oscar, Bulle, Geraule, Esteves, Fontes and Anacleto. For the first official game on September 15, the opponent was Santos Athletic Club, also known at the time as the ‘Clube dos Ingleses’. Santos first official goal in the history of the club was scored by Arnaldo Silveira. In the beginning of 1913, Santos received an invitation from the São Paulo Football League to compete in the state championship. This was Santos’ first official competition and the debut happened on June 1, against Germânia. The result was not a very good one, as the team was defeated 8–1. Santos formation at that match was Durval Damasceno, Sebastião Arantes, Sydnei Simonsen; Geraule Ribeiro, Ambrósio Silva, José Pereira da Silva; Adolfo Millon, Nilo Arruda, Anacleto Ferramenta, Harold Cross and Arnaldo Silveira. In 1913, the Campeonato Santista de Futebol took place for the first time, and the teams taking part of it were Santos, América, Escolástica Rosa and Atlético. The Alvinegro (the “black and white” as Santos is also called by fans) was crowned the champion, having six victories in six games, 35 goals for and only seven against. This was the very first achievement in the history of the club.

Three weeks later, on June 22, Santos won their first match in an official competition against a team who would become the club greatest rival, Corinthians. Santos won 6–3 in a full Parque São Jorge, Corinthians’ home.

== 1917-1935 ==
Between the 1917 and 1926 seasons, Santos was recognized as a solid and talented team, but one that could not offer a true challenge for the state title, finishing no higher than fourth place. That changed in 1927 when the tradition of the Alvinegro became defined during the 1920s: the discovery and creation of young talent. The team, known as O ataque dos 100 gols (English: The 100-goal attackers), was led by the first major club idol, Araken Patusca, son of the first president of Santos. With the Araken Patusca was the first Santista to participate in a World Cup, as a member of the Brazil national team in the FIFA World Cup in 1930, the first World Cup. He played one match against Yugoslavia. Santos finished as runners-up in 1927, 1928 and 1929, scoring 100 goals in 16 games in season 1927, resulting in an incredible rate of 6.25 goals per match. The milestone of 100 goals was a result of work characteristics emblazoned in the official anthem of the club: Técnica e Disciplina (English: Technique and Discipline). Santos entered a period of irregular campaigns, coinciding with the club's transition to professionalism; in 1933 the president of Santos publicly declared for the first time Santos a professional side. This was followed by the club's first great success in 1935. During that season, the club prepared heavily for the Paulistão with 14 friendlies, winning seven, losing four and three draw matches. The 10-1 thrashing of Espanha at the hands of Santos provided the highlight of its preseason preparations. On the last match of the state competition, Santos defeated Corinthians 2–0 at the Estádio Parque São Jorge, Corinthians' home ground at the time, to win their debut state title, thanks to goals by Raul and an experienced Araken Patusca. This historic consecration sealed Santos' first major title and set the bar for future generations to sustain.

Santos failed to defend the state title the following season, but the club remained undefeated in international matches during the 1930s, with seven wins and one draw. The most significant win was against the France national football team, who arrived at Santos on July 30 after the FIFA World Cup in Uruguay and used the stop to play a local team, handly losing 6–1 with four goals from Feitiço. Their saving grace was a claiming the opponents were the Seleção rather than the "local" club. The suspicious French, on invitation to the clubhouse, found the team was not Seleção in disguise.
