= Hermann Friese =

German-Brazilian athlete and referee (1880-1945)

Georg Paul Hermann Friese
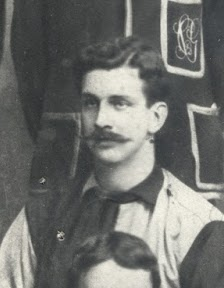
- Friese ca. 1904

Personal information
- Date of birth: 22 May 1880
- Place of birth: Hamburg, Germany
- Date of death: October 1945 (aged 65)
- Position: Forward

Georg Paul Hermann Friese (22 May 1880 – October 1945) was a German-Brazilian athlete, association football player who played as a forward, and referee. He is considered alongside Charles Miller, Hans Nobiling and Oscar Cox one of the most important pioneers of football in Brazil and is recognized as the first exceptional footballer there.

== Early life and family ==
Friese was born in Hamburg, the son of Hermann Peter Johannes Friese and Henriette Friedericke Adelaide Bertha Hohlers.

== Career ==
In 1903, the 23-year-old Friese migrated from Germany to Brazil where he joined Sport Club Germânia, the club of the German community of São Paulo, founded in 1899 by Hans Nobiling. Like Nobiling, Friese played in Hamburg for SC Germania 1887 - one of the precursors of today's Hamburger SV - which gave name and colours to the Brazilian club.

Friese was top scorer of the State Championship of São Paulo, the Campeonato Paulista, of 1905 with 14 goals and won the championship with Germânia in 1906 and 1915. In 1903 the newspaper O Estado de S. Paulo called him "the most sensational player of all time" (o jogador mais sensacional de todos os tempos).

Friese was also coach of the team where around 1909 Arthur Friedenreich obtained his first experiences. "Fried", these days considered of one of the greatest players of all time, was son of a German businessman that migrated from Hamburg and a black Brazilian woman. By intervention of Friese, statutes of the club prohibiting the membership of coloured people were removed.

Friese also was a football referee - then not uncommon for a player - and officiated the deciding matches of the State Championships of 1903, 1904, 1910 and 1920. He also was referee of the Troféu Interestadual of 1910, where Botafogo FC of Rio de Janeiro defeated AA das Palmeiras with 7–2 in the Velódromo of São Paulo.

On 22 October 1916, he officiated the State Championship between Santos FC and Ypiranga, which also was the opening match for the stadium of Santos, the Vila Belmiro. Santos won the match 2–1. Altogether, Friese arbitrated at least 53 State Championship matches.

These days, Friese is one of ten patrons of the Academia Paulista de Árbitros de Futebol "Charles Miller," an honour he shares with World Cup referees like José Roberto Wright, Armando Marques, Arnaldo Cézar Coelho and Romualdo Arppi Filho, amongst others.

Still in Europe he was a formidable track and field athlete, winning the German championship over 1500 metres of 1902. In May 1907 he was the sole representative of Brazil in an international competition in Uruguay and in one evening won the 1500 and 800-metre competitions and finishing second over 400 metres.
