= Gamba (footballer) =

Brazilian footballer (1893-1944)

Personal information
- Full name: Carlos Alberto Gambarotta
- Date of birth: 7 December 1893
- Date of death: 17 March 1944 (aged 50)
- Place of death: Mantiqueira Mountains, Campos do Jordão, São Paulo, Brazil
- Position: Forward

Youth career
- –1918: Ítalo

Senior career*
Years	Team	Apps	(Gls)
1919–1928	Corinthians	167	(82)
1931–1933	Bahia		

International career
1922	Brazil	2	(2)
- * Club domestic league appearances and goals

Carlos Alberto Gambarotta (7 December 1893 – 17 March 1944), known as Gamba, was a Brazilian footballer who played for Corinthians and Bahia. He was capped twice by the Brazil national football team in 1922, scoring two goals.

== Career statistics ==
=== International ===
National team	Year	Apps	Goals
Brazil	1922	2	2
Total		2	2

=== International goals ===
Scores and results list Brazil's goal tally first, score column indicates score after each Brazil goal.

List of international goals scored by Gamba
No.	Date	Venue	Opponent	Score	Result	Competition
1	22 October 1922	Parque Antártica, São Paulo, Brazil	Argentina	?–?	2–1	Copa Julio Argentino Roca
1	29 October 1922	Chácara da Floresta, São Paulo, Brazil	Paraguay	?–?	3–1	Copa Rodrigues Alves

== Honours ==
Corinthians

- Campeonato Paulista: 1922, 1923, 1924
- Taça Competência: 1922
