= Ademir Fonseca =

Brazilian footballer

Personal information
- Full name: Ademir Fonseca dos Santos
- Date of birth: 18 January 1963 (age 63)
- Place of birth: Nepomuceno, Brazil
- Height: 1.80 m (5 ft 11 in)
- Position: Defender

Youth career
- 1975–1982: Botafogo

Senior career*
Years	Team	Apps	(Gls)
1981–1986	Botafogo		
1986	→ Santa Cruz-RN		
1986–1987	→ Vitória		
1987	Volta Redonda		
1987	Santa Cruz		
1988–1991	Joinville		
1992	Comercial-SP		
1992	Sãocarlense		
1993–1994	Atlético Paranaense		
1995	Santo André		
1996	São José-SP		
1996	Botafogo-SP		
1997	Ituano		

Managerial career
- 1997: Ituano
- 1998: Sãocarlense
- 1998: Comercial-SP
- 1998: Tubarão
- 1999: São Bento
- 2000: Madureira
- 2000: CRB
- 2001: Volta Redonda
- 2001: Tupi
- 2002: Ituano
- 2002: Marcílio Dias
- 2002: Rio Branco-SP
- 2003: América-RN
- 2003: Joinville
- 2003: Rio Branco-SP
- 2004: Joinville
- 2004: Caldense
- 2004: Mogi Mirim
- 2004: Ipatinga
- 2005: Cabofriense
- 2005: Inter de Limeira
- 2006: Cabofriense
- 2006: Paysandu
- 2006: Ituano
- 2007: Remo
- 2007: America-RJ
- 2007: Caldense
- 2008: America-RJ
- 2008: Bangu
- 2008: Cabofriense
- 2008: Gama
- 2009: Rio Branco-SP
- 2009: Cabofriense
- 2010: Tupi
- 2010: Vila Nova
- 2010: Rio Branco-SP
- 2011: Oeste
- 2011: São Caetano
- 2011: Goiás
- 2011: Fortaleza
- 2012: Caldense
- 2012: ABC
- 2013: CRB
- 2013: Santo André
- 2014: Oeste
- 2014: Anápolis
- 2014–2015: CRB
- 2015: Guarani
- 2016: URT
- 2016: Al-Shoulla
- 2017: Resende
- 2017: Botafogo-PB
- 2018: Ferroviário
- 2018: Olaria
- 2019: Uberlândia
- 2019: Tupi
- 2020: URT
- 2020: Villa Nova
- 2021: ASA
- 2022: Tupi
- 2024: União Suzano
- * Club domestic league appearances and goals

Ademir Fonseca dos Santos (born 18 January 1963), simply known as Ademir Fonseca, is a Brazilian former professional footballer and manager, who played as a defender.

== Playing career ==
Revealed by Botafogo FR, Ademir Fonseca is from the same generation of players who became famous as Josimar and Alemão. He didn't win official titles at Botafogo, but he won the Bern Tournament in 1985 against Young Boys.

== Managerial career ==
Ademir Fonseca began his career as a coach immediately after retiring, at Ituano FC in 1997. At Ituano he achieved one of the greatest achievements of his career, the 2002 Campeonato Paulista title. He also won the state championships in 2006 with Paysandu and in 2013 with CRB, in addition to other successful campaigns for teams from the interior of Brazil.

Fonseca suffered a heart attack during the match Uberlândia vs. Serranense for Módulo II, in March 2019, having to undergo emergency heart surgery.

On 6 February 2024, he was announced as coach of União Suzano for the Campeonato Paulista Série A3.

== Honours ==
=== Player ===
Botafogo

- Torneio Internacional de Berna: 1985

=== Manager ===
Ituano

- Campeonato Paulista: 2002

Paysandu

- Campeonato Paraense: 2006

CRB

- Campeonato Alagoano: 2013

Tupi

- Campeonato Mineiro Módulo II: 2001
