= 1905 Campeonato Paulista =

Campeonato Paulista
- Season: 1905
- Champions: Paulistano
- Matches played: 30
- Goals scored: 119 (3.97 per match)
- Top goalscorer: Hermann Friese (Germânia) – 14 goals
- Biggest home win: Mackenzie 6–0 AA das Palmeiras (June 22, 1905); Germânia 6–0 São Paulo A.C. (July 2, 1905)
- Biggest away win: AA das Palmeiras 1-7 Germânia (September 10, 1905)
- Highest scoring: Mackenzie 3–5 São Paulo A.C. (July 1, 1905); AA das Palmeiras 1-7 Germânia (September 10, 1905)

The 1905 Campeonato Paulista, organized by the LPF (Liga Paulista de Football), was the 4th season of São Paulo's top association football league. Paulistano won the title for the 1st time. No teams were relegated. Germânia's Hermann Friese was the top scorer with 14 goals.

== System ==
The championship was disputed in a double-round robin system, with the team with the most points winning the title. The last-placed team would dispute a playoff to remain in the league.

== Championship ==
Pos	Team	Pld	W	D	L	GF	GA	GD	Pts	Qualification or relegation
1	Paulistano	10	8	2	0	20	3	+17	18	Champions
2	Germânia	10	5	3	2	30	16	+14	13	
3	Internacional	10	4	3	3	15	19	−4	11	
4	São Paulo Athletic	10	4	0	6	16	26	−10	8	
5	Mackenzie	10	3	1	6	27	27	0	7	
6	AA das Palmeiras	10	1	1	8	10	27	−17	3	Relegation Playoffs

Updated to match(es) played on November 1, 1905. Source: RSSSF.com
Rules for classification: 1) points; 2) goal difference; 3) wins; 4) head-to-head points.

=== Relegation Playoffs ===
==== Preliminary round ====
Team 1	Score	Team 2
Internacional de Santos	2–0	Americano

==== Playoffs ====
Team 1	Score	Team 2
AA das Palmeiras	4–1	Internacional de Santos
