= 1915 Campeonato Paulista =

In the 1915 season of the Campeonato Paulista, two championships were played, each by a different league.

== APSA Championship ==
Campeonato Paulista
- Season: 1915
- Champions: AA das Palmeiras
- Matches played: 29
- Goals scored: 99 (3.41 per match)
- Top goalscorer: Carlos Nazareth (AA das Palmeiras) – 13 goals
- Biggest home win: Paulistano 6-1 Scottish Wanderers (April 18, 1915)
- Biggest away win: São Bento 0-4 AA das Palmeiras (May 23, 1915)
- Highest scoring: Mackenzie 5-3 Scottish Wanderers (May 13, 1915)

The APSA-organized Campeonato Paulista started with the same participants as last year. Shortly after the beginning of the championship, Corinthians left LPF and attempted to join APSA, and although nominally accepted in the league, it wasn't a full member and couldn't take part in the championship, and as such, the team was only allowed to friendlies that year. At the end of the championship, AA das Palmeiras won its 3rd title. the top scorer was AA das Palmeiras's Carlos Nazareth with 13 goals.

=== System ===
The championship was disputed in a double-round robin system, with the team with the most points winning the title.

=== Championship ===
Pos	Team	Pld	W	D	L	GF	GA	GD	Pts	Qualification or relegation
1	AA das Palmeiras	10	9	1	0	30	11	+19	19	Champions
2	Mackenzie	10	6	3	1	19	11	+8	15	
3	Ypiranga	10	4	1	5	14	14	0	9	
4	Paulistano	9	4	0	5	16	16	0	8 (Note: The October 28 match between Paulistano and São Bento wasn't held)	
5	Scottish Wanderers	10	2	2	6	15	27	−12	6	
6	São Bento	9	0	1	8	5	20	−15	1	

Updated to match(es) played on December 5, 1915. Source: RSSSF.com
Rules for classification: 1) points; 2) goal difference; 3) wins; 4) head-to-head points.

== LPF Championship ==
Campeonato Paulista
- Season: 1915
- Champions: Germânia
- Matches played: 42
- Goals scored: 129 (3.07 per match)
- Top goalscorer: Facchini (Campos Elyseos) – 17 goals
- Biggest home win: Germânia 5-1 Maranhão (May 13, 1915); Luzitano 4-0 Maranhão (June 20, 1915); Minas Gerais 4-0 Maranhão (September 5, 1915); Germânia 4-0 Maranhão (September 19, 1915)
- Biggest away win: Minas Gerais 0-3 Campos Elyseos (June 13, 1915); Vicentino 0-3 Campos Elyseos (December 12, 1915)
- Highest scoring: Luzitano 3-4 Campos Elyseos (May 23, 1915)

The edition of the 1915 Campeonato Paulista organized by the LPF (Liga Paulista de Football) ended with Germânia winning the title for the 2nd time. the top scorer was Campos Elyseos's Facchini with 17 goals.

=== System ===
The championship was disputed in a double-round robin system, with the team with the most points winning the title.

=== Championship ===
Pos	Team	Pld	W	D	L	GF	GA	GD	Pts	Qualification or relegation
1	Germânia	12	10	1	1	32	14	+18	21	Champions
2	Campos Elyseos	12	8	2	2	27	14	+13	18	
3	Internacional	12	7	3	2	17	10	+7	17	
4	Luzitano	12	4	2	6	16	15	+1	10	
5	Minas Gerais	12	4	0	8	16	24	−8	8	
6	Vicentino	12	2	1	9	10	22	−12	5	
7	Maranhão	12	2	1	9	11	30	−19	5	

Updated to match(es) played on December 19, 1915. Source: RSSSF.com
Rules for classification: 1) points; 2) goal difference; 3) wins; 4) head-to-head points.
