= 1902 in association football =

The following are the football (soccer) events of the year 1902 throughout the world.

== Events ==
March 6: Real Madrid is founded

=== Clubs formed in 1902 ===
- Norwich City Football Club
- Real Madrid
- Fluminense Football Club
- L.R. Vicenza
- MSV Duisburg
- Grazer AK

== Winners club national championship ==
- Brazil - There was not a national championship. State, provincial as said in that time, championships were separately held for each province for five decades until 1959 Taça Brasil, a significant unifier cup among state champions. 1902 Campeonato Paulista, State of São Paulo championship, was pioneer in the country.
  - São Paulo Province – São Paulo Athletic
- Hungary:
  - Hungarian National Championship I – Budapesti TC
- Italy:
  - Italian Football Championship – Genoa C.F.C.
- Scotland:
  - Scottish Division One – Rangers
  - Scottish Division Two – Port Glasgow
  - Scottish Cup – Hibernian

== International tournaments ==
- 1902 British Home Championship (February 22 – May 3, 1902)

Scotland

== Births ==
- March 7: Ernő Schwarz, Hungarian-born American football player and coach (died 1977)
- May 1: Ernst Nagelschmitz, German footballer (died 1987)
- July 22: Andrés Mazali, Uruguayan footballer (died 1975)
- November 20: Giampiero Combi (Italian footballer)
