= 1994 Campeonato Paulista =

Campeonato Paulista - Série A1
- Season: 1994
- Champions: Palmeiras
- Relegated: Ituano; Mogi Mirim; Santo André
- Matches played: 240
- Goals scored: 637 (2.65 per match)
- Top goalscorer: Evair (Palmeiras) - 23 goals
- Biggest home win: Ponte Preta 8-1 Ferroviária (April 16, 1994)
- Biggest away win: Ituano 1-6 XV de Piracicaba (February 5, 1994)
- Highest scoring: Ponte Preta 8-1 Ferroviária (April 16, 1994)

The 1994 Campeonato Paulista de Futebol Profissional da Primeira Divisão - Série A1 was the 93rd season of São Paulo's top professional football league. Palmeiras won the championship for the 20th time. Ituano, Mogi Mirim and Santo André were relegated.

== Championship ==
The championship was disputed in a double round-robin format, with the team with the most points being champion and the bottom three teams being relegated.

Pos	Team	Pld	W	D	L	GF	GA	GD	Pts	Qualification or relegation
1	Palmeiras	30	20	7	3	63	24	+39	47	Champions
2	São Paulo	30	16	9	5	66	38	+28	41	
3	Corinthians	30	16	9	5	59	34	+25	41	
4	Santos	30	11	12	7	37	34	+3	34	
5	América	30	12	6	12	32	32	0	30	
6	Novorizontino	30	8	13	9	35	37	−2	29	
7	Rio Branco	30	10	8	12	35	37	−2	28	
8	Portuguesa	30	9	10	11	40	49	−9	28	
9	União São João	30	8	12	10	40	40	0	28	
10	Guarani	30	8	11	11	49	46	+3	27	
11	Bragantino	30	8	11	11	26	39	−13	27	
12	Ferroviária	30	10	6	14	34	50	−16	26	
13	Ponte Preta	30	8	10	12	37	43	−6	26	
14	Mogi Mirim	30	8	10	12	37	46	−9	26	Relegated
15	Santo André	30	8	7	15	27	42	−15	23	Relegated
16	Ituano	30	5	9	16	22	46	−24	19	Relegated

Updated to match(es) played on 15 May 1994. Source: RSSSF.com
Rules for classification: 1) points; 2) wins; 3) goal difference; 4) number of goals scored.

== Top Scores ==
Rank	Player	Club	Goals
1	Evair	Palmeiras	23
2	Viola	Corinthians	19
3	Djalminha	Guarani	18
4	Palhinha	São Paulo	13
5	Marcelinho Carioca	Corinthians	12
6	Clóvis	Guarani	11
7	Cacaio	América	10
8	Leonardo	São Paulo	9
8	Caio	Portuguesa	9
