= 1915 in Brazilian football =

Football in Brazil
- Season: 1915

The following article presents a summary of the 1915 football (soccer) season in Brazil, which was the 14th season of competitive football in the country.

== Campeonato Paulista ==
In 1915 there were two different editions of the Campeonato Paulista. One was organized by the Associação Paulista de Esportes Atléticos (APEA) while the other one was organized by the Liga Paulista de Foot-Ball (LPF).

=== APEA's Campeonato Paulista ===
Final Standings

Position	Team	Points	Played	Won	Drawn	Lost	For	Against	Difference
1	AA das Palmeiras	19	10	9	1	0	30	11	19
2	Mackenzie	15	10	6	3	1	19	11	8
3	Ypiranga-SP	9	10	4	1	5	14	14	0
4	Paulistano	8	10	4	0	5	16	16	0
5	Scottish Wanderers	6	10	2	2	6	15	27	−12
6	AA São Bento	1	10	0	1	9	5	20	−16

AA das Palmeiras declared as the APEA's Campeonato Paulista champions.

=== LPF's Campeonato Paulista ===
Final Standings

Position	Team	Points	Played	Won	Drawn	Lost	For	Against	Difference
1	Germânia	21	12	10	1	1	32	14	18
2	Campos Elíseos	18	12	8	2	2	27	14	13
3	SC Internacional de São Paulo	17	12	7	3	2	17	10	7
4	SC Luzitano	10	12	4	2	6	16	15	1
5	Minas Gerais	8	12	4	0	8	16	24	−8
6	Maranhão	5	12	2	1	9	10	22	−12
7	Vicentino	5	12	2	1	9	11	30	−19

Germânia declared as the LPF's Campeonato Paulista champions.

== State championship champions ==
State	Champion
Amazonas	Manaos Athletic
Bahia	Fluminense de Salvador
Minas Gerais	Atlético Mineiro
Paraná	Internacional-PR
Pernambuco	Flamengo-PE
Rio de Janeiro (DF)	Flamengo
São Paulo	AA das Palmeiras (by APEA); Pinheiros (by LPF)

== Brazil national team ==
The Brazil national football team did not play any matches in 1915.
