= 1984 Campeonato Paulista =

Campeonato Paulista – Série A1
- Season: 1984
- Champions: Santos
- Relegated: Taquaritinga; Taubaté
- Taça de Ouro: Ponte Preta
- Taça de Prata: América; Marília
- Matches: 380
- Goals: 781 (2.06 per match)
- Top goalscorer: Serginho Chulapa (Santos); Chiquinho (Botafogo) – 16 goals
- Biggest home win: Ponte Preta 5-0 XV de Piracicaba (October 24, 1984)
- Biggest away win: São Bento 0-3 Santos (July 18, 1984); XV de Jaú 0-3 Ponte Preta (July 25, 1984); Inter de Limeira 0-3 Botafogo (August 5, 1984); Taubaté 0-3 Santos (August 12, 1984); Ferroviária 1-4 Ponte Preta (August 22, 1984); Comercial 0-3 Santos (October 14, 1984); Santo André 1-4 Taubaté (October 21, 1984); Comercial 0-3 Palmeiras (November 10, 1984); Taquaritinga 0-3 São Paulo (November 15, 1984); Juventus 0-3 Botafogo (November 24, 1984)
- Highest scoring: Corinthians 5-1 Portuguesa (July 29, 1984); Guarani 5-1 Botafogo (August 19, 1984); Santos 4-2 Juventus (August 22, 1984); Comercial 5-1 Taquaritinga (September 19, 1984); Ponte Preta 4-2 Ferroviária (October 28, 1984)

The 1984 Campeonato Paulista da Primeira Divisão de Futebol Profissional da Série A1 was the 83rd season of São Paulo's top professional football league. Santos won the championship for their 15th Campeonato Paulista title. Noroeste and Marília were relegated.

== Championship ==
The twenty teams of the championship would all play twice against each other, with the team with the most points being champions, and the bottom two teams being relegated.

Pos	Team	Pld	W	D	L	GF	GA	GD	Pts	Qualification or relegation
1	Santos	38	22	13	3	54	19	+35	57	Champions
2	Corinthians	38	22	10	6	58	29	+29	54	
3	São Paulo	38	19	13	6	52	25	+27	53 (Note: São Paulo won the points of a 2-1 loss against Palmeiras due to a Palmeiras player being caught in a antidoping exam.)	
4	Palmeiras	38	21	10	7	54	26	+28	50	
5	Ponte Preta	38	17	12	9	52	36	+16	46	
6	Guarani	38	15	13	10	50	37	+13	43	
7	América	38	13	16	9	34	31	+3	42	
8	Marília	38	14	12	12	41	28	+13	40	
9	Santo André	38	11	18	9	38	38	0	40	
10	Inter de Limeira	38	13	12	13	31	38	−7	38	
11	Botafogo	38	12	14	12	43	38	+5	38	
12	XV de Jaú	38	9	17	12	34	45	−11	35	
13	Juventus	38	9	14	15	36	44	−8	32	
14	Portuguesa	38	11	8	19	29	41	−12	30	
15	Comercial	38	9	12	17	29	50	−21	30	
16	XV de Piracicaba	38	7	16	15	31	51	−20	30	
17	Ferroviária	38	8	12	18	34	54	−20	28	
18	São Bento	38	8	12	18	27	50	−23	28	
19	Taquaritinga	38	7	12	19	29	52	−23	26	Relegated
20	Taubaté	38	5	10	23	25	49	−24	20	Relegated

Updated to match(es) played on December 2, 1984. Source: RSSSF.com
Rules for classification: 1) points; 2) wins; 3) goal difference; 4) number of goals scored.
