= 1986 Campeonato Paulista =

Campeonato Paulista – Série A1
- Season: 1986
- Champions: Inter de Limeira
- Relegated: Comercial; Paulista
- Série B: Inter de Limeira; Juventus; Santo André
- Matches: 386
- Goals: 814 (2.11 per match)
- Top goalscorer: Kita (Inter de Limeira) – 23 goals
- Biggest home win: Portuguesa 5–0 São Bento (June 14, 1986); Inter de Limeira 5-0 XV de Piracicaba (July 23, 1986)
- Biggest away win: Novorizontino 0–3 Palmeiras (June 28, 1986); Ponte Preta 0-3 Palmeiras (July 13, 1986); XV de Piracicaba 0-3 Portuguesa (July 20, 1986); Santo André 0-3 Palmeiras (July 23, 1986)
- Highest scoring: São Paulo 4-5 Comercial (July 9, 1986)

The 1986 Campeonato Paulista da Primeira Divisão de Futebol Profissional was the 85th season of São Paulo's top professional football league. Inter de Limeira won the championship for the first time. Comercial and Paulista were relegated.

== Championship ==
The twenty teams of the championship would all play twice against each other, with the best teams of each half and the two overall best teams qualifying to the Semifinals, and the bottom two teams being relegated.

=== First phase ===
Pos	Team	Pld	W	D	L	GF	GA	GD	Pts	Qualification or relegation
1	Inter de Limeira	38	18	13	7	53	31	+22	49	Qualified as stage winners
2	Palmeiras	38	17	13	8	54	31	+23	47	Qualified due to best season record
3	Corinthians	38	18	10	10	49	34	+15	46	Qualified due to best season record
4	Portuguesa	38	16	11	11	52	37	+15	43	
5	Juventus	38	16	10	12	48	41	+7	42	
6	São Paulo	38	11	20	7	50	36	+14	42	
7	Santo André	38	11	17	10	26	35	−9	39	
8	Santos	38	15	8	15	43	44	−1	38	Qualified as stage winners
9	São Bento	38	13	11	14	31	40	−9	37	
10	América	38	9	18	11	27	29	−2	36	
11	Novorizontino	38	12	11	15	42	47	−5	35	
12	Ponte Preta	38	11	13	14	41	43	−2	35	
13	Ferroviária	38	10	15	13	33	33	0	35	
14	XV de Piracicaba	38	10	15	13	32	43	−11	35	
15	Botafogo	38	12	11	15	37	51	−14	35	
16	Mogi Mirim	38	8	19	11	36	38	−2	35	
17	Guarani	38	10	14	14	40	47	−7	34	
18	XV de Jaú	38	11	11	16	31	40	−9	33	
19	Comercial	38	10	13	15	38	49	−11	33	Relegated
20	Paulista	38	9	13	16	39	53	−14	31	Relegated

Updated to match(es) played on August 17, 1986. Source: RSSSF.com
Rules for classification: 1) points; 2) wins; 3) goal difference; 4) number of goals scored.

=== Semifinals ===
Team 1	Agg.	Team 2	1st leg	2nd leg
Corinthians	1–3	Palmeiras	1–0	0–3 (a.e.t)
Santos	1–4	Inter de Limeira	0–2	1–2

=== Finals ===
Team 1	Agg.	Team 2	1st leg	2nd leg
Palmeiras	1–2	Inter de Limeira	0–0	1–2
