= 2002 Campeonato Paulista =

Campeonato Paulista - Série A1
- Season: 2002
- Champions: Ituano (Championship); São Paulo (Superchampionship)
- Relegated: Matonense
- Matches played: 140
- Goals scored: 447 (3.19 per match)
- Top goalscorer: Alex Alves (Juventus) - 17 goals
- Biggest home win: América 7-0 Portuguesa Santista (January 27, 2002)
- Biggest away win: América 0-4 Inter de Limeira (April 7, 2002)
- Highest scoring: União São João 8-3 América (March 16, 2002)

The 2002 Campeonato Paulista de Futebol Profissional da Primeira Divisão - Série A1 was the 101st season of São Paulo's top professional football league. The championship proper only had the presence of the smaller teams of the state, since the Rio-São Paulo tournament took up most of the first semester for the bigger teams. The champions would get a berth in the Superchampionship, which would also feature the three best Paulista teams in the Rio-São Paulo. Ituano won the championship for the 1st time, and subsequently, lost the finals of the Superchampionship to São Paulo. Matonense was relegated.

== Championship ==
Pos	Team	Pld	W	D	L	GF	GA	GD	Pts	Qualification or relegation
1	Ituano (C, A)	22	11	7	4	39	26	+13	40	Qualified to Superchampionship
2	União São João	22	12	3	7	49	35	+14	39	
3	Rio Branco	22	10	7	5	37	28	+9	37	
4	Juventus	22	10	7	5	38	34	+4	37	
5	Santo André	22	9	6	7	28	25	+3	33	
6	Mogi Mirim	22	8	7	7	33	35	−2	31	
7	Botafogo de Ribeirão Preto	22	8	6	8	34	37	−3	30	
8	Inter de Limeira	22	8	5	9	34	26	+8	29	
9	União Barbarense	22	6	10	6	33	36	−3	28	
10	América de Rio Preto	22	7	4	11	37	42	−5	25	
11	Portuguesa Santista (O)	22	5	4	13	29	47	−18	19	Relegation Playoffs
12	Matonense (R)	22	3	5	14	29	45	−16	14	Relegated to 2003 Série A2

Updated to match(es) played on unknown. Source: RSSSF.com
Rules for classification: 1) points; 2) goal difference; 3) number of goals scored.
(A) Advance to a further round; (C) Champions; (O) Play-off winners; (R) Relegated

== Relegation Playoffs ==
Team 1	Agg.	Team 2	1st leg	2nd leg
Francana	4–4 (2-3 pen.)	Portuguesa Santista	2-2	2–2

== Superchampionship ==
=== Semifinals ===
Team 1	Agg.	Team 2	1st leg	2nd leg
Ituano	4–3	Corinthians	2-0	2–3
São Paulo	4–2	Palmeiras	2-0	2-2

=== Finals ===
Team 1	Agg.	Team 2	1st leg	2nd leg
Ituano	3–6	São Paulo	2-2	1–4
