= 1925 Campeonato Paulista =

Campeonato Paulista
- Season: 1925
- Champions: AA São Bento (2nd title)
- Top goalscorer: Feitiço (AA São Bento) – 10 goals

The 1925 Campeonato Paulista was the 24th season of São Paulo's top association football league. The edition was organized by the APEA (Associação Paulista de Esportes Atléticos) from April 19 to November 22. The top scorer was Feitiço with 10 goals.

== System ==
The championship was disputed in a single round-robin system, with the team with the most points winning the title.

== Championship ==
| Pos | Team | Pld | W | D | L | GF | GA | GD | Pts | Qualification or relegation |
|---|---|---|---|---|---|---|---|---|---|---|
| 1 | AA São Bento | 10 | 8 | 0 | 2 | 25 | 17 | +8 | 16 | Champions |
| 2 | Corinthians | 10 | 7 | 1 | 2 | 20 | 7 | +13 | 15 | |
| 3 | Paulistano | 10 | 7 | 1 | 2 | 20 | 10 | +10 | 15 | |
| 4 | Santos | 10 | 6 | 1 | 3 | 19 | 15 | +4 | 13 | |
| 5 | Palestra Itália | 10 | 5 | 1 | 4 | 23 | 16 | +7 | 11 | |
| 6 | Sírio | 10 | 5 | 1 | 4 | 23 | 20 | +3 | 11 | |
| 7 | Portuguesa | 10 | 4 | 0 | 6 | 14 | 17 | −3 | 8 | |
| 8 | SC Internacional | 10 | 3 | 0 | 7 | 15 | 23 | −8 | 6 | |
| 9 | Germânia | 10 | 3 | 0 | 7 | 14 | 24 | −10 | 6 | |
| 10 | Ypiranga | 10 | 2 | 2 | 6 | 12 | 21 | −9 | 6 | |
| 11 | Auto | 10 | 1 | 1 | 8 | 9 | 24 | −15 | 3 | |
| 12 | AA das Palmeiras | 0 | 0 | 0 | 0 | 0 | 0 | 0 | 0 | Disqualified |

Updated to match(es) played on June 3, 2022. Source: RSSSF.com
Rules for classification: 1) points; 2) goal difference; 3) wins; 4) head-to-head points.
