= 1920 Campeonato Paulista =

Football League

Campeonato Paulista
- Season: 1920
- Champions: Palestra Itália
- Matches: 81
- Goals: 394 (4.86 per match)
- Top goalscorer: Neco (Corinthians) – 24 goals
- Biggest home win: Palestra Itália 11-0 Internacional (August 8, 1920)
- Biggest away win: AA das Palmeiras 0-12 Paulistano (May 16, 1920)
- Highest scoring: AA das Palmeiras 0-12 Paulistano (May 16, 1920)

The 1920 Campeonato Paulista, organized by the APEA (Associação Paulista de Esportes Atléticos), was the 19th season of São Paulo's top association football league. Palestra Itália won the title for the 1st time. The top scorer was Corinthians's Neco with 24 goals.

== System ==
The championship was played in a double-round robin system, with the team with the most points winning the title.

== Championship ==
Pos	Team	Pld	W	D	L	GF	GA	GD	Pts	Qualification or relegation
1	Palestra Itália	17	13	2	2	58	11	+47	28	Playoffs
2	Paulistano	17	13	2	2	68	23	+45	28	Playoffs
3	Corinthians	17	13	1	3	75	21	+54	27	
4	São Bento	17	10	1	6	36	26	+10	21	
5	Ypiranga	17	7	3	7	38	31	+7	17	
6	Minas Gerais	17	7	2	8	47	31	+16	16	
7	Internacional	17	5	1	11	24	61	−37	11	
8	AA das Palmeiras	17	3	1	13	22	77	−55	7	
9	Mackenzie	17	2	1	14	10	77	−67	5	
10	Santos	9	1	0	8	13	33	−20	2	Withdrew

Updated to match(es) played on December 12, 1920. Source: RSSSF.com
Rules for classification: 1) points; 2) goal difference; 3) wins; 4) head-to-head points.

=== Playoffs ===
19 December 1920
16:00

Palestra Itália	2 – 1	Paulistano
Martinelli 5'; Forte 77'	Report	Mário 6'

Chácara da Floresta, São Paulo
Referee: Hermann Friese

== Results ==
=== First Round ===
21 April 1920	Santos	2-5	Paulistano	Villa Belmiro, Santos, São Paulo
15:30	Millon 4'; Cícero (1T)	Report	Friedenreinch 15' (pen.), 18', 28'; Cassiano (2T), (2T)

21 April 1920	Internacional	2-1	Minas Gerais	Ponte Grande, São Paulo
	Rodrigues 55', Quilim (2T)	Report	Brenno (2T)

21 April 1920	São Bento	6-0	AA das Palmeiras	Parque Antárctica, São Paulo
	Zucchi; Dias; Infantini; Barthô	Report

25 April 1920	Corinthians	0-3	Palestra Itália	Ponte Grande, São Paulo
16:00		Report	Ministro 20'; Heitor 55', (2T)

25 April 1920	Ypiranga	2-2	Mackenzie	Parque Antárctica, São Paulo
		Report
