= 1995 Campeonato Paulista =

Campeonato Paulista - Série A1
- Season: 1995
- Champions: Corinthians
- Relegated: Bragantino; Ponte Preta; XV de Piracicaba
- Matches played: 266
- Goals scored: 645 (2.42 per match)
- Top goalscorer: Bentinho (São Paulo); Paulinho McLaren (Portuguesa) - 20 goals
- Biggest home win: Palmeiras 5-0 Guarani (February 8, 1995); Corinthians 5-0 Araçatuba (February 11, 1995); Corinthians 5-0 Ponte Preta (February 22, 1995)
- Biggest away win: Ponte Preta 0-6 XV de Piracicaba (February 8, 1995)
- Highest scoring: Portuguesa 5-3 Araçatuba (March 22, 1995)

The 1995 Campeonato Paulista de Futebol Profissional da Primeira Divisão - Série A1 was the 94th season of São Paulo's top professional football league. Corinthians won the championship and with it their 21st Campeonato Paulista title. Bragantino, Ponte Preta and XV de Piracicaba were relegated.

== Championship ==
The championship was disputed in a double round-robin format, with the seven best teams qualifying to the Final phase, and being joined by the champion of that year's Second level. then, the teams were divided into two groups of four, and the winner of each group would play the Finals. The bottom three in the First phase would be relegated.

=== First phase ===
| Pos | Team | Pld | W | D | L | GF | GA | GD | Pts | Qualification or relegation |
|---|---|---|---|---|---|---|---|---|---|---|
| 1 | Portuguesa | 30 | 16 | 10 | 4 | 47 | 29 | +18 | 58 | Qualified |
| 2 | São Paulo | 30 | 15 | 9 | 6 | 45 | 27 | +18 | 54 | Qualified |
| 3 | Santos | 30 | 13 | 11 | 6 | 49 | 30 | +19 | 50 | Qualified |
| 4 | Palmeiras | 30 | 12 | 9 | 9 | 47 | 30 | +17 | 45 | Qualified |
| 5 | Guarani | 30 | 12 | 9 | 9 | 40 | 36 | +4 | 45 | Qualified |
| 6 | Corinthians | 30 | 10 | 12 | 8 | 42 | 32 | +10 | 42 | Qualified |
| 7 | União São João | 30 | 10 | 9 | 11 | 35 | 38 | −3 | 39 | Qualified |
| 8 | Araçatuba | 30 | 11 | 5 | 14 | 30 | 41 | −11 | 38 | |
| 9 | Juventus | 30 | 9 | 9 | 12 | 28 | 33 | −5 | 36 | |
| 10 | Rio Branco | 30 | 8 | 12 | 10 | 39 | 42 | −3 | 36 | |
| 11 | Novorizontino | 30 | 8 | 11 | 11 | 26 | 36 | −10 | 35 | |
| 12 | América | 30 | 7 | 14 | 9 | 26 | 32 | −6 | 35 | |
| 13 | Ferroviária | 30 | 9 | 7 | 14 | 24 | 32 | −8 | 34 | |
| 14 | XV de Piracicaba | 30 | 8 | 10 | 12 | 38 | 44 | −6 | 34 | Relegated |
| 15 | Bragantino | 30 | 7 | 11 | 12 | 27 | 36 | −9 | 32 | Relegated |
| 16 | Ponte Preta | 30 | 7 | 8 | 15 | 30 | 55 | −25 | 29 | Relegated |

Updated to match(es) played on 11 June 1995. Source: RSSSF.com
Rules for classification: 1) points; 2) wins; 3) goal difference; 4) number of goals scored.

=== Final phase ===
==== Group 1 ====
| Pos | Team | Pld | W | D | L | GF | GA | GD | Pts | Qualification or relegation |
|---|---|---|---|---|---|---|---|---|---|---|
| 1 | Palmeiras | 6 | 3 | 3 | 0 | 10 | 4 | +6 | 12 | Qualified |
| 2 | Mogi Mirim | 6 | 3 | 1 | 2 | 9 | 11 | −2 | 10 | |
| 3 | São Paulo | 6 | 2 | 1 | 3 | 6 | 8 | −2 | 7 | |
| 4 | Guarani | 6 | 1 | 1 | 4 | 6 | 8 | −2 | 4 | |

Updated to match(es) played on 23 July 1995. Source: RSSSF.com
Rules for classification: 1) points; 2) Best season record

==== Group 2 ====
| Pos | Team | Pld | W | D | L | GF | GA | GD | Pts | Qualification or relegation |
|---|---|---|---|---|---|---|---|---|---|---|
| 1 | Corinthians | 6 | 5 | 1 | 0 | 13 | 5 | +8 | 16 | Qualified |
| 2 | Portuguesa | 6 | 3 | 0 | 3 | 8 | 5 | +3 | 10 (Note: Portuguesa won 1 extra point for winning the first stage) | |
| 3 | Santos | 6 | 1 | 2 | 3 | 10 | 14 | −4 | 5 | |
| 4 | União São João | 6 | 1 | 1 | 4 | 5 | 12 | −7 | 4 | |

Updated to match(es) played on 23 July 1995. Source: RSSSF.com
Rules for classification: 1) points; 2) Best season record

=== Finals ===
| Team 1 | Agg. | Team 2 | 1st leg | 2nd leg |
|---|---|---|---|---|
| Corinthians | 3–2 | Palmeiras | 1-1 | 2–1 (a.e.t) |

== Top Scores ==
| Rank | Player | Club | Goals |
|---|---|---|---|
| 1 | Bentinho | São Paulo | 20 |
| 1 | Paulinho McLaren | Portuguesa | 20 |
| 3 | Giovanni | Santos | 19 |
| 4 | Marcelo Passos | Santos | 17 |
| 5 | Marcelinho Carioca | Corinthians | 14 |
| 6 | Flávio | Portuguesa | 13 |
| 7 | Tupãzinho | Corinthians | 12 |
| 8 | Djalminha | Guaraní | 11 |
| 9 | Rivaldo | Palmeiras | 10 |
| 9 | Válber | Palmeiras | 10 |
| 11 | Gaúcho | Ponte Preta | 9 |
