= 1911 Campeonato Paulista =

Campeonato Paulista
- Season: 1911
- Champions: São Paulo Athletic
- Matches played: 24
- Goals scored: 109 (4.54 per match)
- Top goalscorer: Décio Viccari (Americano) – 9 goals
- Biggest home win: AA das Palmeiras 6-1 Ypiranga (May 3, 1911); Americano 7-2 Germânia (August 27, 1911)
- Biggest away win: Ypiranga 2-7 Americano (July 9, 1911)
- Highest scoring: Ypiranga 2-7 Americano (July 9, 1911); Americano 7-2 Germânia (August 27, 1911)

The 1911 Campeonato Paulista, organized by the LPF (Liga Paulista de Football), was the 10th season of São Paulo's top association football league. São Paulo Athletic won the title for the 4th time. No teams were relegated. The top scorer was Americano's Décio Viccari with 9 goals.

== System ==
The championship was disputed in a double-round robin system, with the team with the most points winning the title.

== Championship ==
Pos	Team	Pld	W	D	L	GF	GA	GD	Pts	Qualification or relegation
1	São Paulo Athletic	9	7	1	1	23	15	+8	15	Champions
2	Americano	9	6	1	2	29	15	+14	13	
3	Paulistano	9	3	1	5	17	15	+2	7	
4	Germânia	9	3	0	6	14	26	−12	6	
5	Ypiranga	9	2	1	6	13	28	−15	5	
6	AA das Palmeiras	5	2	0	3	13	10	+3	4 (Note: After a 4-3 loss to Germânia in the fourth round, AA das Palmeiras appealed the annulation of that match to LPF, claiming that Germânia's forward Wilhelm Baumgartner was ineligible. When LPF rejected the appeal, AA das Palmeiras left the league.)	Withdrew

Updated to match(es) played on October 29, 1911. Source: RSSSF.com
Rules for classification: 1) points; 2) goal difference; 3) wins; 4) head-to-head points.
