= 1988 Campeonato Paulista =

Campeonato Paulista – Série A1
- Season: 1988
- Champions: Corinthians (20th title)
- Copa do Brasil: Corinthians; Guarani
- Matches: 217
- Goals: 497 (2.29 per match)
- Top goalscorer: Evair (Guarani) – 19 goals
- Biggest home win: Guarani 5–0 Botafogo (March 6, 1988); São Paulo 5-0 América (March 9, 1988)
- Biggest away win: Mogi Mirim 0-4 São Paulo (June 4, 1988)
- Highest scoring: Ferroviária 4–4 Santo André (May 29, 1988)

The 1988 Campeonato Paulista da Primeira Divisão de Futebol Profissional was the 87th season of São Paulo's top professional football league. Corinthians won the championship for the 20th time. No teams were relegated.

== Championship ==
The twenty teams of the championship were divided into two groups of ten teams, with each team playing once against the teams of its own group and the other group. The four best teams of each group would qualify to the Second phase, where the eight teams would be divided into two groups of four, with the winner of each group qualifying to the Finals.

=== First phase ===
==== Group 1 ====
Pos	Team	Pld	W	D	L	GF	GA	GD	Pts	Qualification or relegation
1	Inter de Limeira	19	10	6	3	23	10	+13	26	Qualified
2	São Paulo	19	11	3	5	35	20	+15	25	Qualified
3	Santos	19	9	6	4	20	12	+8	24	Qualified
4	XV de Jaú	19	7	7	5	26	25	+1	21	Qualified
5	Noroeste	19	5	9	5	19	19	0	19	
6	Botafogo	19	7	4	8	18	25	−7	18	
7	Mogi Mirim	19	6	5	8	15	23	−8	17	
8	Juventus	19	5	6	8	19	26	−7	16	
9	Novorizontino	19	3	5	11	18	29	−11	11	
10	União São João	19	3	5	11	15	26	−11	11	

Updated to match(es) played on June 13, 1988. Source: RSSSF.com
Rules for classification: 1) points; 2) wins; 3) goal difference; 4) number of goals scored.

==== Group 2 ====
Pos	Team	Pld	W	D	L	GF	GA	GD	Pts	Qualification or relegation
1	Corinthians	19	11	4	4	32	16	+16	26	Qualified
2	Guarani	19	9	8	2	35	15	+20	26	Qualified
3	São José	19	9	8	2	29	16	+13	26	Qualified
4	Palmeiras	19	8	7	4	26	18	+8	23	Qualified
5	Portuguesa	19	7	5	7	24	22	+2	19	
6	Ferroviária	19	7	4	8	24	31	−7	18	
7	XV de Piracicaba	19	6	4	9	20	28	−8	16	
8	Santo André	19	2	9	8	20	30	−10	13	
9	São Bento	19	2	9	8	9	22	−13	13	
10	América	19	3	6	10	21	35	−14	12	

Updated to match(es) played on June 13, 1988. Source: RSSSF.com
Rules for classification: 1) points; 2) wins; 3) goal difference; 4) number of goals scored.

=== Second phase ===
==== Group A ====
Pos	Team	Pld	W	D	L	GF	GA	GD	Pts	Qualification or relegation
1	Guarani	6	4	1	1	7	3	+4	9	Qualified
2	São José	6	3	0	3	6	5	+1	6	
3	Inter de Limeira	6	2	1	3	5	5	0	5	
4	XV de Jaú	6	1	2	3	2	7	−5	4	

Updated to match(es) played on July 17, 1988. Source: RSSSF.com
Rules for classification: 1) points; 2) wins; 3) goal difference; 4) number of goals scored.

==== Group B ====
Pos	Team	Pld	W	D	L	GF	GA	GD	Pts	Qualification or relegation
1	Corinthians	6	2	4	0	8	5	+3	8	Qualified
2	São Paulo	6	2	3	1	8	6	+2	7	
3	Palmeiras	6	1	3	2	3	4	−1	5	
4	Santos	6	1	2	3	5	9	−4	4	

Updated to match(es) played on July 17, 1988. Source: RSSSF.com
Rules for classification: 1) points; 2) wins; 3) goal difference; 4) number of goals scored.

=== Finals ===
Team 1	Agg.	Team 2	1st leg	2nd leg
Corinthians	2–1	Guarani	1–1	1–0 (a.e.t)
