= 1912 Campeonato Paulista =

Campeonato Paulista
- Season: 1912
- Champions: Americano
- Matches played: 38
- Goals scored: 162 (4.26 per match)
- Top goalscorer: Arthur Friedenreich (Mackenzie) – 16 goals
- Biggest home win: Mackenzie 8-2 Ypiranga (May 3, 1912)
- Biggest away win: Ypiranga 0-8 Germânia (October 13, 1912)
- Highest scoring: Paulistano 8-3 Ypiranga (April 14, 1912)

The 1912 Campeonato Paulista, organized by the LPF (Liga Paulista de Football), was the 11th season of São Paulo's top association football league. Americano won the title for the 1st time. No teams were relegated. Mackenzie's Arthur Friedenreich was the top scorer, with 16 goals.

== System ==
The championship was disputed in a double-round robin system, with the team with the most points winning the title.

== Championship ==
Despite the fact that AA das Palmeiras had left the league the previous year, the championship expanded, with the return of Mackenzie and Internacional. The last four matches of the championship were cancelled because a São Paulo XI team would tour Rio Grande do Sul in November, which would leave the teams short of important players if the matches were to be held.

Pos	Team	Pld	W	D	L	GF	GA	GD	Pts	Qualification or relegation
1	Americano	11	7	4	0	25	9	+16	18	Champions
2	Paulistano	10	7	1	2	28	15	+13	15	
3	Germânia	12	5	3	4	27	20	+7	13	
4	Mackenzie	10	5	2	3	35	19	+16	12	
5	Internacional	10	2	3	5	11	21	−10	7	
6	São Paulo Athletic	11	3	1	7	16	28	−12	7	
7	Ypiranga	12	1	2	9	20	50	−30	4	

Updated to match(es) played on October 27, 1912. Source: RSSSF.com
Rules for classification: 1) points; 2) goal difference; 3) wins; 4) head-to-head points.
