= 1904 Campeonato Paulista =

Campeonato Paulista
- Season: 1904
- Champions: São Paulo Athletic
- Matches played: 31
- Goals scored: 99 (3.19 per match)
- Top goalscorer: Charles Miller (São Paulo Athletic); Herbert Boyes (São Paulo Athletic) – 9 goals
- Biggest home win: São Paulo A.C. 5–0 AA das Palmeiras (June 29, 1904); São Paulo A.C. 5–0 Internacional (August 7, 1904); Internacional 5-0 AA das Palmeiras (August 21, 1904); Germânia 5-0 AA das Palmeiras (September 18, 1904)
- Biggest away win: Mackenzie 0-5 São Paulo A.C. (September 28, 1904)
- Highest scoring: Paulistano 5–1 AA das Palmeiras (June 5, 1904); Internacional 2-4 Paulistano (August 28, 1904)

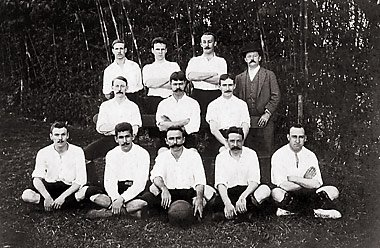
The football team of São Paulo Athletic Club (SPAC), with Charles Miller seated in centre.

The 1904 Campeonato Paulista, organized by the LPF (Liga Paulista de Football), was the 3rd season of São Paulo's top association football league. São Paulo Athletic won the title for the 3rd consecutive time. No teams were relegated. The top scorers were São Paulo Athletic's Herbert Boyes and Charles Miller with 9 goals apiece.

== System ==
The championship was disputed in a double-round robin system, with the team with the most points winning the title. The last-placed team would dispute a playoff against a non-league team, Internacional de Santos, to remain in the league.

== Championship ==
Pos	Team	Pld	W	D	L	GF	GA	GD	Pts	Qualification or relegation
1	São Paulo Athletic	10	8	2	0	28	4	+24	18	Playoffs
2	Paulistano	10	8	2	0	20	6	+14	18	Playoffs
3	Internacional	10	6	0	4	22	15	+7	12	
4	Mackenzie	10	3	0	7	11	21	−10	6	
5	Germânia	10	2	0	8	11	18	−7	4	
6	AA das Palmeiras	10	1	0	9	6	34	−28	2	Relegation Playoffs

Updated to match(es) played on October 14, 1904. Source: RSSSF.com
Rules for classification: 1) points; 2) goal difference; 3) wins; 4) head-to-head points.

=== Relegation Playoffs ===
Team 1	Score	Team 2
AA das Palmeiras	4–0	Internacional de Santos

=== Finals ===
30 October 1904

São Paulo Athletic	1 – 0	Paulistano
Charles Miller

Velódromo Paulistano, São Paulo
Referee: E. Lefevre
