= 1990 Campeonato Paulista =

Campeonato Paulista – Série A1
- Season: 1990
- Champions: Bragantino
- Copa do Brasil: Corinthians; XV de Piracicaba
- Matches: 422
- Goals: 793 (1.88 per match)
- Top goalscorer: Alberto (Ituano); Rubem (Guarani); Volnei (Ferroviária) – 12 goals
- Biggest home win: São Paulo 6–1 Noroeste (June 19, 1990)
- Biggest away win: Ponte Preta 0–3 Bragantino (March 7, 1990); Noroeste 0–3 São Paulo (June 3, 1990); Ferroviária 0–3 Palmeiras (July 12, 1990); XV de Jaú 0–3 Botafogo (August 15, 1990)
- Highest scoring: São Paulo 6–1 Noroeste (June 19, 1990)

The 1990 Campeonato Paulista da Primeira Divisão de Futebol Profissional was the 89th season of São Paulo's top professional football league. Bragantino won the championship for the first time. No teams were relegated.

== Championship ==
The twenty-four teams of the championship were divided into two groups of twelve teams, with each team playing once against the teams of its own group and the other group. Group 1 comprised the twelve best teams in the previous year's championship, while Group 2 had the ten worst teams of that championship and the two teams that had been promoted from the second level. The three best teams of each group, plus the six overall best teams aside of them would qualify to the Third phase, while the others that had been eliminated would participate in the Second phase.

The Second phase's twelve teams were divided into two groups of six, with each team playing twice against the teams of its own group, with the best team of each group qualifying to The Third phase and 1991's Green Group. In the third phase, the fourteen teams were divided into two groups of seven, with each team playing twice against the teams of its own group, and the best team of each group qualifying to the Finals.

=== First phase ===
==== Group 1 ====
Pos	Team	Pld	W	D	L	GF	GA	GD	Pts	Qualification or relegation
1	Corinthians	23	11	11	1	21	7	+14	33	Qualified
2	Palmeiras	23	13	5	5	31	12	+19	31	Qualified
3	Bragantino	23	11	6	6	26	14	+12	28	Qualified
4	Novorizontino	23	8	9	6	26	19	+7	25	Qualified
5	Santos	23	7	11	5	18	15	+3	25	Qualified
6	Mogi Mirim	23	6	13	4	23	20	+3	25	Qualified
7	Portuguesa	23	5	15	3	24	20	+4	25	Qualified
8	São Paulo	23	8	7	8	22	17	+5	23	Second phase
9	União São João	23	7	9	7	22	17	+5	23	Second phase
10	Guarani	23	6	11	6	18	15	+3	23	Second phase
11	São José	23	5	12	6	20	26	−6	22	Second phase
12	Inter de Limeira	23	5	9	9	19	27	−8	19	Second phase

Updated to match(es) played on May 12, 1990. Source: RSSSF.com
Rules for classification: 1) points; 2) wins; 3) goal difference; 4) number of goals scored.

==== Group 2 ====
Pos	Team	Pld	W	D	L	GF	GA	GD	Pts	Qualification or relegation
1	XV de Piracicaba	23	9	9	5	21	15	+6	27	Qualified
2	XV de Jaú	23	11	4	8	29	25	+4	26	Qualified
3	Ferroviária	23	9	7	7	26	21	+5	25	Qualified
4	Ituano	23	9	7	7	18	17	+1	25	Qualified
5	América	23	9	7	7	17	24	−7	25	Qualified
6	Ponte Preta	23	7	9	7	23	22	+1	23	Second phase
7	Botafogo	23	6	11	6	21	21	0	23	Second phase
8	São Bento	23	6	6	11	24	27	−3	18	Second phase
9	Noroeste	23	5	7	11	18	29	−11	17	Second phase
10	Juventus	23	4	7	12	18	36	−18	15	Second phase
11	Santo André	23	4	5	14	15	33	−18	13	Second phase
12	Catanduvense	23	4	5	14	12	33	−21	13	Second phase

Updated to match(es) played on May 12, 1990. Source: RSSSF.com
Rules for classification: 1) points; 2) wins; 3) goal difference; 4) number of goals scored.

=== Second phase ===
==== Group 1 ====
Pos	Team	Pld	W	D	L	GF	GA	GD	Pts	Qualification or relegation
1	Botafogo	10	4	6	0	12	5	+7	14	Qualified
2	São Paulo	10	5	3	2	19	9	+10	13	1991 Yellow Group
3	Santo André	10	4	2	4	7	7	0	10	1991 Yellow Group
4	Ponte Preta	10	4	2	4	10	12	−2	10	1991 Yellow Group
5	Inter de Limeira	10	3	4	3	9	9	0	10	1991 Yellow Group
6	Noroeste	10	0	3	7	4	19	−15	3	1991 Yellow Group

Updated to match(es) played on June 21, 1990. Source: RSSSF.com
Rules for classification: 1) points; 2) wins; 3) goal difference; 4) number of goals scored.

==== Group 2 ====
Pos	Team	Pld	W	D	L	GF	GA	GD	Pts	Qualification or relegation
1	Guarani	10	6	2	2	17	6	+11	14	Qualified
2	União São João	10	4	4	2	12	9	+3	12	1991 Yellow Group
3	São Bento	10	4	3	3	12	13	−1	11	1991 Yellow Group
4	Juventus	10	3	4	3	9	11	−2	10	1991 Yellow Group
5	São José	10	2	5	3	7	8	−1	9	1991 Yellow Group
6	Catanduvense	10	1	2	7	3	13	−10	4	1991 Yellow Group

Updated to match(es) played on June 21, 1990. Source: RSSSF.com
Rules for classification: 1) points; 2) wins; 3) goal difference; 4) number of goals scored.

=== Third phase ===
==== Group Black ====
Pos	Team	Pld	W	D	L	GF	GA	GD	Pts	Qualification or relegation
1	Bragantino	12	7	4	1	15	6	+9	18	Qualified
2	Corinthians	12	5	7	0	13	6	+7	17	
3	Santos	12	5	5	2	11	10	+1	15	
4	Botafogo	12	5	2	5	12	11	+1	12	
5	Ituano	12	3	4	5	16	16	0	10	
6	Mogi Mirim	12	1	7	4	5	10	−5	9	
7	XV de Jaú	12	0	3	9	8	21	−13	3	

Updated to match(es) played on August 16, 1990. Source: RSSSF.com
Rules for classification: 1) points; 2) wins; 3) goal difference; 4) number of goals scored.

==== Group Red ====
Pos	Team	Pld	W	D	L	GF	GA	GD	Pts	Qualification or relegation
1	Novorizontino	12	5	6	1	11	5	+6	16	Qualified
2	Palmeiras	12	5	5	2	12	7	+5	15	
3	Guarani	12	4	7	1	11	7	+4	15	
4	Portuguesa	12	3	6	3	16	13	+3	12	
5	América	12	2	7	3	9	10	−1	11	
6	XV de Piracicaba	12	2	6	4	13	17	−4	10	
7	Ferroviária	12	1	3	8	4	17	−13	5	

Updated to match(es) played on August 16, 1990. Source: RSSSF.com
Rules for classification: 1) points; 2) wins; 3) goal difference; 4) number of goals scored.

=== Finals ===
Team 1	Agg.	Team 2	1st leg	2nd leg
Novorizontino	2–2	Bragantino	1–1	1–1
