= 1906 Campeonato Paulista =

Campeonato Paulista
- Season: 1906
- Champions: Germânia
- Matches played: 23
- Goals scored: 91 (3.96 per match)
- Top goalscorer: Hermann Friese (Germânia); Leônidas (Internacional) – 7 goals
- Biggest home win: Germânia 6–0 São Paulo A.C. (May 20, 1906)
- Biggest away win: São Paulo A.C. 1-9 Internacional (August 5, 1906)
- Highest scoring: São Paulo A.C. 1-9 Internacional (August 5, 1906)

The 1906 Campeonato Paulista, organized by the LPF (Liga Paulista de Football), was the 5th season of São Paulo's top association football league. Germânia won the title for the 1st time. No teams were relegated. Germânia's Hermann Friese and Internacional's Leônidas were the top scorers with 7 goals each.

== System ==
The championship was disputed in a double-round robin system, with the team with the most points winning the title.

== Championship ==
Before the start of the championship, a split happened between the players and officials of Paulistano, with many of the former leaving to join AA das Palmeiras.

The previous champions went out of the running for the title quickly, as Paulistano was still trying to rebuild its team and São Paulo Athletic was in decline, so the title was mostly disputed between Palmeiras and Germânia.

After a string of poor performances, capped with a 1-9 loss to Internacional, São Paulo Athletic withdrew from the championship. Later, Mackenzie also withdrew, after the school shut down its sports department.

After AA das Palmeiras' last match, against Internacional, which would have secured the title for them, Internacional reported AA das Palmeiras to LPF claiming irregularities on ticket sales, and despite the fact that no irregularities were proven, LPF expelled AA das Palmeiras from the league and Germânia were declared champions instead. As a consequence, AA das Palmeiras broke with LPF, with both only reconciling in 1909, and the 1906 championship being struck from the league's records upon their reconciliation. However, years later, FPF retroactively declared all of LPF's Paulista championships as official, including the 1906 edition.

Pos	Team	Pld	W	D	L	GF	GA	GD	Pts	Qualification or relegation
1	Germânia	10	8	0	2	25	9	+16	16	Champions
2	Internacional	10	6	0	4	23	14	+9	12	
3	Paulistano	10	3	1	6	10	21	−11	7	
4	Mackenzie	10	2	2	6	10	13	−3	6	Withdrew
5	São Paulo Athletic	10	0	1	9	5	26	−21	1	Withdrew
6	AA das Palmeiras	10	9	0	1	18	8	+10	18	Disqualified

Updated to match(es) played on October 7, 1906. Source: Futebolnacional.com.br
Rules for classification: 1) points; 2) goal difference; 3) wins; 4) head-to-head points.
