= Armando Del Debbio =

Brazilian footballer and manager (1904-1984)

Del Debbio
Personal information
- Full name: Armando Del Debbio
- Date of birth: November 2, 1904
- Place of birth: Santos, Brazil
- Date of death: May 8, 1984 (aged 79)
- Place of death: São Paulo, Brazil
- Position: Left back

Senior career*
Years	Team	Apps	(Gls)
1919–1921	AA São Bento		
1922–1931	Corinthians		
1931–1935	Lazio		
1935–1937	Corinthians		
1939	Corinthians		

International career
1929–1931	Brazil	3	(1)

Managerial career
- 1936–1937: São Paulo
- 1938: Corinthians
- 1939-1941: Corinthians
- 1942-1944: Palmeiras
- 1947: Corinthians
- * Club domestic league appearances and goals

Armando Del Debbio (November 2, 1904 – May 8, 1984), commonly known as Del Debbio, was a Brazilian football left back, who played for the Brazil national team.

== Playing career ==
Del Debbio started his career playing for São Bento in 1919, leaving the club in 1921, to join Corinthians, where he stayed until 1931. During his stint at Corinthians, he won the Campeonato Paulista in 1922, 1923, 1924, 1928, 1929 and 1930. He joined Lazio of Italy in 1931, leaving the club in 1935 to play again for Corinthians, where he won again the Campeonato Paulista in 1937. He returned to Corinthians in 1939, winning the Campeonato Paulista and retiring during that year.

=== National team ===
Del Debbio played three games for the Brazil national team. He played his first game on February 24, 1929, against Rampla Juniors of Uruguay. His second game for the national team was played on August 1, 1930, against France. Del Debbio played his last game for Brazil on July 2, 1931, against Ferencváros of Hungary, scoring his only goal in that game.

== Coaching career ==
Del Debbio was hired in 1936 by São Paulo's president Manoel do Carmo Mecca to work as the club's first head coach after its rebirth. He worked as Corinthians' head coach in 1939.

== Honors ==
=== Player ===
Corinthians

- Campeonato Paulista: 1922, 1923, 1924, 1928, 1929, 1930, 1937, 1939 (as player and manager)
- Taça Competência: 1922
- Taça APEA: 1930

=== Manager ===
Corinthians

- Campeonato Paulista: 1938, 1941

Palmeiras

- Campeonato Paulista: 1942
