= 1917 Campeonato Paulista =

Campeonato Paulista
- Season: 1917
- Champions: Paulistano
- Matches: 72
- Goals: 300 (4.17 per match)
- Top goalscorer: Arthur Friedenreich (Ypiranga) – 15 goals
- Biggest home win: Santos 7-0 Ypiranga (September 16, 1917)
- Biggest away win: Internacional 1-5 Santos (April 29, 1917)
- Highest scoring: AA das Palmeiras 9-4 Santos (July 1, 1917)

The 1917 Campeonato Paulista, organized by the APEA (Associação Paulista de Esportes Atléticos), was the 16th season of São Paulo's top association football league. Paulistano won the title for the 5th time. The top scorer was Ypiranga's Arthur Friedenreich, with 15 goals.

== System ==
The championship was disputed in a double-round robin system, with the team with the most points winning the title.

== Championship ==
Pos	Team	Pld	W	D	L	GF	GA	GD	Pts	Qualification or relegation
1	Paulistano	16	12	3	1	41	17	+24	27	Champions
2	Palestra Itália	16	10	5	1	41	18	+23	25	
3	Corinthians	16	8	3	5	39	26	+13	19	
4	Santos	16	8	3	5	44	36	+8	19	
5	AA das Palmeiras	16	7	3	6	32	27	+5	17	
6	Ypiranga	16	6	3	7	34	37	−3	15	
7	São Bento	16	3	3	10	23	41	−18	9	
8	Internacional	16	3	1	12	25	58	−33	7	
9	Mackenzie	16	1	4	11	21	40	−19	6	

Updated to match(es) played on October 27, 1917. Source: RSSSF.com
Rules for classification: 1) points; 2) goal difference; 3) wins; 4) head-to-head points.
