= Campeonato Paulista =

Association football league in São Paulo, Brazil

- Organising body: FPF
- Founded: 1902; 124 years ago
- Country: Brazil
- State: (São Paulo (state)) São Paulo
- Number of clubs: 16
- Level on pyramid: 1
- Relegation to: Série A2
- Domestic cup: Copa Paulista
- Current champions: Palmeiras (27th title) (2026)
- Most championships: Corinthians (31 titles)
- Top scorer: Pelé (466)
- Broadcasters: RecordTV; TNT Sports; Paulistão Play; Premiere
- Website: FPF Official website
- Current: 2026 Campeonato Paulista

The Campeonato Paulista Série A1, commonly known as Campeonato Paulista, nicknamed Paulistão, is the top-flight professional state football league in the Brazilian state of São Paulo. Run by the São Paulo State Football Federation (FPF), the league is contested by 16 clubs and typically lasts from January to April. Rivalries amongst four of the best-known Brazilian teams (Corinthians, Palmeiras, Santos and São Paulo) have marked the history of the competition. The Campeonato Paulista is the oldest established league in Brazil, being held since 1902 and professionally since 1933.

== Format ==
Campeonato Paulista is held annually by the Federação Paulista de Futebol (São Paulo State Football Federation), or FPF, amongst teams residing within the state of São Paulo. After 2016, 16 clubs compete at the highest championship level (Série A1). In a new format started in 2015, the 16 teams are divided into four groups of four, however, teams of the same group don't play against each other, totaling 12 rounds. After this, the top two of each group advance to the final stages followed by an eight-team playoff with a single-legged tie in the Quarterfinals, with a tie of the teams of the same group and Semi-finals, only the Final happens in a two-leg format. The two lowest-placed teams in the overall table are relegated to the lower competition (Série A2) for the following year.

Also, in the Série A1, the six best clubs reaching the latter stages qualify for the Copa do Brasil, and the best three qualify for the Série D.

Série A2 is contested by 16 teams in two separate phases. In Phase One, the teams play against each other once in a round-robin format. After 15 rounds, the knockout round happens in an eight-team playoff with a home-and-away series. The two finalists of the Série A2 will advance to the Série A1 of the following year. Also, the bottom two are demoted to the Série A3.

Série A3 consists of 16 teams competing in a two-phase format similar to Série A2. Promotion and relegation rules are the same as the 2nd level of São Paulo's football system.

Formerly called Segunda Divisão, in 2024, the FPF renamed the 4th tier of the São Paulo State Championship to Série A4. It has the same system as the Série A2 and Série A3. However, the teams must field only five players over 23 years old.

From 2024, the Segunda Divisão or Paulistão Sub-23 stands as the 5th tier, originally planned to be reintroduced in 2021, the plans were aborted due to the COVID-19 pandemic. In this year, 17 clubs played in matches that occurred after the conclusion of the four tiers above this division. The number of teams varies, and they must field only Under-23 players. The two best teams are promoted to the Série A4.

== History ==
=== Founding ===
Charles Miller was responsible for the creation of the first São Paulo state tournament. Miller introduced the Laws of the Game to Brazil upon his return from England, where he attended college and discovered the sport. On December 14, 1901, the Liga Paulista de Foot-Ball (Paulista Football League) or LPF was founded, comprising five initial teams: São Paulo Athletic Club, Internacional, Mackenzie College, Paulistano and Germania Between April and October 1902, those teams competed in the first edition of the tournament, with São Paulo AC winning the title and Miller himself as the leading goalscorer. Unlike in Argentina and Uruguay, football was restricted to elitist clubs in its early days in Brazil.

Football popularity grew in following years. Paulistano, a club composed of the children of the richest families of São Paulo, became the strongest team. However, the popularity base of the sport started to change after a brilliant exhibition tour by the Corinthians, a London amateur team, in São Paulo and Rio de Janeiro. They easily defeated the best Brazilian teams of the time and made a very favorable impression amongst the younger fans. Shortly thereafter, a group of workers were inspired to found the city's first popular team, Sport Club Corinthians Paulista.

=== 1910s–1930s ===
Growth of football popularity amongst lower classes generated a rift in the LPF. Their directors had defended that football should remain an elitist sport. This difference in opinion led to creation of another competing league, the Associação Paulista de Esportes Atléticos (Paulista Association of Athletic Sports), APEA, which promoted the sport among all social classes. Corinthians and Palestra Itália (a new club founded by Italian immigrants), and Paulistano helped to comprise the new league.

The LPF ceased operation in 1917. Until 1926, the APEA remained the only league in São Paulo. Stronger teams, larger crowds and players such as Neco (Corinthians) and Arthur Friedenreich (Paulistano) contributed to the football mania that converted football from a foreigners' pastime to Brazil's most popular sport. Debates surrounded the issue of whether football should professionalize or remain a purely amateur endeavor. Paulistano, the most trophied team at the time, refused to become professional and departed in 1925 to create the Liga de Amadores de Futebol (League of Football Amateurs). Competition between the two leagues fueled expansion of the teams, as clubs from upstate began to join.

By 1930, the LAF and Paulistano had folded, and a new era for São Paulo football began. Players became professional in 1933 when the Bandeirante Football League was created. Corinthians and Palestra Itália assumed their positions as the most powerful and popular teams. A new club emerges to compete for the hearts of supporters. Some dissidents from Paulistano, favorable to professionalization, along with the directors of AA Palmeiras united to form São Paulo Futebol Clube, the third force of the city.

=== Modern era ===
The APEA had ceased operations in 1938, and after several name changes, the original Bandeirante Football League officially became the Federação Paulista de Futebol (Paulista Football Federation), [FPF] on April 22, 1941. São Paulo signed Leonidas da Silva in the following year and won five of the next eight championships. Palestra Itália change its name to Palmeiras in 1943 due to a World War II period law that banned Axis powers references in sport. Football grows within the state and a second division is created in 1948, allowing upstate teams to take part in major league competition. XV de Novembro from Piracicaba was the first team promoted to the top flight.

São Paulo, Palmeiras and Corinthians dominated titles in early 1950s. Santos, although having competed consistently, would need to wait a few more years to gain top status. 1957 saw the debut of one of football's greatest players, Pelé. His goals helped Santos to win nine of the next twelve championships. Pelé was the league top scorer in every year between 1957 and 1965 including a record 58 goals in a single season. Santos won numerous competitions at the state, national, regional and international level. Palmeiras's "Academia" teams were the only ones able to break such dominance in the sixties.

Since the 1960s, Brazil began to develop more mature national competitions which competed with the state and regional tournaments for supporter's attention. In 1977, Corinthians' were able to win a title after a 24-year drought, and the early eighties saw the battle between Corinthians (led by Sócrates) and São Paulo's (Serginho Chulapa). The "Corinthians Democracy" won in 1982 and 1983 while introducing a new philosophy in club management, where players participate in all decisions with management. São Paulo became the most successful team of the decade, winning the championship in 1980, 1981, 1985, 1987 and 1989. The last years saw the emergence of players such as Müller and Silas (known as the "Menudos do Morumbi") on that team. Internacional from Limeira accomplished a great upset in 1986 by defeating Palmeiras to win the final.

Bragantino vs. Novorizontino was the final in the 1990 championship in the Paulistão's biggest ever upset. Palmeiras' fans saw their club win the 1993, 1994 and 1996 championships. Rivaldo, Roberto Carlos, Edmundo, César Sampaio are among the members of the "Green Machine" which scored 100 goals in the 1996 tournament. Corinthians conquered the trophy five times in the 1995–2003 period, thus becoming the most successful team in the first 100 years of the Campeonato Paulista, with 25 titles.

Since 2000, Campeonato Paulista has lost popularity with each year. The main São Paulo state teams treat the tournament as tune-ups for the more lucrative Copa Libertadores and Brazilian National Championship. However, the Paulistão, as well as the other state tournaments in Brazil, still hold significance by providing developing talent and sustaining grass-roots soccer within the state.

Due to the COVID-19 death toll, the government decided to suspend the championship from March 15, 2021, till March 30, 2021, aiming to stop the spread of the coronavirus.

On September 23, 2021, the São Paulo Football Federation recognizes the São Paulo titles of 1933 and 1934, to Albion and Juventus respectively.

== Clubs ==
2025 Série A1

Team	City	Ground	2024 result
Água Santa	Diadema	Distrital do Inamar	10th
Botafogo	Ribeirão Preto	Santa Cruz	13th
Corinthians	São Paulo (Tatuapé)	Neo Química Arena	11th
Guarani	Campinas	Brinco de Ouro	14th
Inter de Limeira	Limeira	Major José Levy Sobrinho	6th
Mirassol	Mirassol	José Maria de Campos Maia	12th
Noroeste	Bauru	Alfredo de Castilho	2nd (Série A2)
Novorizontino	Novo Horizonte	Dr. Jorge Ismael de Biasi	4th
Palmeiras	São Paulo (Perdizes)	Allianz Parque	1st
Ponte Preta	Campinas	Moisés Lucarelli	7th
Portuguesa	São Paulo (Pari)	Canindé	8th
Red Bull Bragantino	Bragança Paulista	Nabi Abi Chedid	3rd
Santos	Santos	Vila Belmiro	2nd
São Bernardo	São Bernardo do Campo	Primeiro de Maio	9th
São Paulo	São Paulo (Morumbi)	Morumbi	5th
Velo Clube	Rio Claro	Benitão	1st (Série A2)

== Champions ==
Season	League	Champions	Runners-up
1902	LPF	SPAC (1)	Paulistano
1903	LPF	SPAC (2)	Paulistano
1904	LPF	SPAC (3)	Paulistano
1905	LPF	Paulistano (1)	Germânia
1906	LPF	Germânia (1)	SC Internacional
1907	LPF	SC Internacional (1)	Paulistano
1907	LPF	SC Internacional (1)	SC Americano
1908	LPF	Paulistano (2)	Germânia
1909	LPF	AA das Palmeiras (1)	Paulistano
1910	LPF	AA das Palmeiras (2)	SC Americano
1911	LPF	SPAC (4)	SC Americano
1912	LPF	SC Americano (1)	Paulistano
1913	APEA	Paulistano (3)	Mackenzie
1913	LPF	SC Americano (2)	Ypiranga
1914	APEA	AA São Bento (1)	Paulistano
1914	LPF	Corinthians (1)	Campos Elíseos
1915	APEA	AA das Palmeiras (3)	Mackenzie
1915	LPF	Germânia (2)	Campos Elíseos
1916	APEA	Paulistano (4)	AA São Bento
1916	LPF	Corinthians (2)	União Lapa
1917	APEA	Paulistano (5)	Palestra Itália
1918	APEA	Paulistano (6)	Corinthians
1919	APEA	Paulistano (7)	Palestra Itália
1920	APEA	Palestra Itália (1)	Paulistano
1921	APEA	Paulistano (8)	Palestra Itália
1922	APEA	Corinthians (3)	Palestra Itália
1923	APEA	Corinthians (4)	Palestra Itália
1924	APEA	Corinthians (5)	Paulistano
1925	APEA	AA São Bento (2)	Corinthians
1926	APEA	Palestra Itália (2)	Auto
1926	LAF	Paulistano (9)	Germânia
1927	APEA	Palestra Itália (3)	Santos
1927	LAF	Paulistano (10)	Hespanha
1928	APEA	Corinthians (6)	Santos
1928	LAF	SC Internacional (2)	Paulistano
1929	APEA	Corinthians (7)	Santos
1929	LAF	Paulistano (11)	SC Internacional
1930	APEA	Corinthians (8)	São Paulo
1931	APEA	São Paulo (1)	Palestra Itália
1932	APEA	Palestra Itália (4)	São Paulo
1933	APEA	Palestra Itália (5)	São Paulo
1933	FPF	Albion (1)	União Guarany
1934	APEA	Palestra Itália (6)	São Paulo
1934	FPF	Fiorentino (1)	Hespanha
1935	APEA	Portuguesa (1)	Ypiranga
1935	LPF	Santos (1)	Palestra Itália
1936	APEA	Portuguesa (2)	Ypiranga
1936	LFP	Palestra Itália (7)	Corinthians
1937	LFESP	Corinthians (9)	Palestra Itália
1938	LFESP	Corinthians (10)	São Paulo
1939	LFESP	Corinthians (11)	Palestra Itália
1940	LFESP	Palestra Itália (8)	Portuguesa
1941	FPF	Corinthians (12)	São Paulo
1942	FPF	Palmeiras (9)	Corinthians
1943	FPF	São Paulo (2)	Corinthians
1944	FPF	Palmeiras (10)	São Paulo
1945	FPF	São Paulo (3)	Corinthians
1946	FPF	São Paulo (4)	Corinthians
1947	FPF	Palmeiras (11)	Corinthians
1948	FPF	São Paulo (5)	Santos
1949	FPF	São Paulo (6)	Palmeiras
1950	FPF	Palmeiras (12)	Santos
1950	FPF	Palmeiras (12)	São Paulo
1951	FPF	Corinthians (13)	Palmeiras
1952	FPF	Corinthians (14)	São Paulo
1953	FPF	São Paulo (7)	Palmeiras
1954	FPF	Corinthians (15)	Palmeiras
1955	FPF	Santos (2)	Corinthians
1956	FPF	Santos (3)	São Paulo
1957	FPF	São Paulo (8)	Santos
1958	FPF	Santos (4)	São Paulo
1959	FPF	Palmeiras (13)	Santos
1960	FPF	Santos (5)	Portuguesa
1961	FPF	Santos (6)	Palmeiras
1962	FPF	Santos (7)	Corinthians
1962	FPF	Santos (7)	São Paulo
1963	FPF	Palmeiras (14)	São Paulo
1964	FPF	Santos (8)	Palmeiras
1965	FPF	Santos (9)	Palmeiras
1966	FPF	Palmeiras (15)	Corinthians
1967	FPF	Santos (10)	São Paulo
1968	FPF	Santos (11)	Corinthians
1969	FPF	Santos (12)	Palmeiras
1970	FPF	São Paulo (9)	Palmeiras
1970	FPF	São Paulo (9)	Ponte Preta
1971	FPF	São Paulo (10)	Palmeiras
1972	FPF	Palmeiras (16)	São Paulo
1973	FPF	Portuguesa (3)	Palmeiras
1973	FPF	Santos (13)	Palmeiras
1974	FPF	Palmeiras (17)	Corinthians
1975	FPF	São Paulo (11)	Portuguesa
1976	FPF	Palmeiras (18)	XV de Piracicaba
1977	FPF	Corinthians (16)	Ponte Preta
1978	FPF	Santos (14)	São Paulo
1979	FPF	Corinthians (17)	Ponte Preta
1980	FPF	São Paulo (12)	Santos
1981	FPF	São Paulo (13)	Ponte Preta
1982	FPF	Corinthians (18)	São Paulo
1983	FPF	Corinthians (19)	São Paulo
1984	FPF	Santos (15)	Corinthians
1985	FPF	São Paulo (14)	Portuguesa
1986	FPF	Inter de Limeira (1)	Palmeiras
1987	FPF	São Paulo (15)	Corinthians
1988	FPF	Corinthians (20)	Guarani
1989	FPF	São Paulo (16)	São José
1990	FPF	Bragantino (1)	Novorizontino
1991	FPF	São Paulo (17)	Corinthians
1992	FPF	São Paulo (18)	Palmeiras
1993	FPF	Palmeiras (19)	Corinthians
1994	FPF	Palmeiras (20)	São Paulo
1995	FPF	Corinthians (21)	Palmeiras
1996	FPF	Palmeiras (21)	São Paulo
1997	FPF	Corinthians (22)	São Paulo
1998	FPF	São Paulo (19)	Corinthians
1999	FPF	Corinthians (23)	Palmeiras
2000	FPF	São Paulo (20)	Santos
2001	FPF	Corinthians (24)	Botafogo
2002	FPF	Ituano (1)	União São João
2003	FPF	Corinthians (25)	São Paulo
2004	FPF	São Caetano (1)	Paulista
2005	FPF	São Paulo (21)	Corinthians
2006	FPF	Santos (16)	São Paulo
2007	FPF	Santos (17)	São Caetano
2008	FPF	Palmeiras (22)	Ponte Preta
2009	FPF	Corinthians (26)	Santos
2010	FPF	Santos (18)	Santo André
2011	FPF	Santos (19)	Corinthians
2012	FPF	Santos (20)	Guarani
2013	FPF	Corinthians (27)	Santos
2014	FPF	Ituano (2)	Santos
2015	FPF	Santos (21)	Palmeiras
2016	FPF	Santos (22)	Audax
2017	FPF	Corinthians (28)	Ponte Preta
2018	FPF	Corinthians (29)	Palmeiras
2019	FPF	Corinthians (30)	São Paulo
2020	FPF	Palmeiras (23)	Corinthians
2021	FPF	São Paulo (22)	Palmeiras
2022	FPF	Palmeiras (24)	São Paulo
2023	FPF	Palmeiras (25)	Água Santa
2024	FPF	Palmeiras (26)	Santos
2025	FPF	Corinthians (31)	Palmeiras
2026	FPF	Palmeiras (27)	Novorizontino

- LPF — Liga Paulista de Foot-Ball (Paulista Football League)
- APEA — Associação Paulista de Esportes Atléticos (Paulista Association of Athletic Sports)
- LAF — Liga Amadores de Futebol (Amateur Football League)
- FPF (1933–1934) — Federação Paulista de Football (Paulista Football Federation), affiliate to the Federação Brasileira de Football (Brazilian Football Federation)
- LFP — Liga de Futebol Paulista (Paulista Football League)
- LFESP — Liga de Futebol do Estado de São Paulo (São Paulo State Football League)
- All editions starting in 1941 organized by the FPF — Federação Paulista de Futebol (Paulista Football Federation)

=== Names change ===
- Due to the World War II (and the fact of Brazil integrating the allied forces), during the year of 1942 Palestra Itália changed the name to the currently SE Palmeiras.
- For the same motive as Palestra Itália, SC Germânia also was changed to the currently EC Pinheiros, but never has competed in a Campeonato Paulista edition with that name.
- After they changed their affiliation from APEA to FPF in 1994, CA Juventus changed its name to CA Fiorentino. Previously the club was also named CA Cotonificio Rodolfo Crespi, name of the textile company that gave rise to the club. Upon returning to APEA, the club used the name CA Juventus again.
- Hespanha/Espanha is currently Jabaquara AC.
- São Paulo Railway (SPR) is currently Nacional AC.
- After partnering with the energy drink company Red Bull in 2020, CA Bragantino changed their name to "Red Bull Bragantino" (or RB Bragantino) just as RB Leipzig and RB Salzburg did.

== Supercampeonato Paulista ==
In 2002, the FPF organized the Super Championship with the top 3 teams in the 2002 Rio-São Paulo Tournament (Corinthians, São Paulo and Palmeiras) and the 2002 Paulista Champions (Ituano). São Paulo won the Championship.

Semi-finals

Held on May 19 and 22

Team 1	Agg.	Team 2	1st leg	2nd leg
Ituano	4–3	Corinthians	2–0	2–3
São Paulo	4–2	Palmeiras	2–0	2–2

Final matches

May 26, 2002
16h00

Ituano	2–2	São Paulo
Fernando Gaúcho 39'; Basílio 77'	Report	68' Reinaldo; 89' Júlio Baptista

Estádio Novelli Júnior, Itu
Referee: Edílson Pereira de Carvalho
May 30, 2002
16h00

São Paulo	4–1	Ituano
Adriano 18', 43'; Reinaldo 66'; Sandro Hiroshi 68'	Report	76' Basílio

Estádio do Morumbi, São Paulo
Referee: Paulo Cesar de Oliveira

Topscorer
Basílio (Ituano) – 4 goals

== Titles by team ==
Club	Winners	Runners-up	Winning years
Corinthians	31	21	1914 (LPF), 1916 (LPF), 1922, 1923, 1924, 1928 (APEA), 1929 (APEA), 1930, 1937, 1938, 1939, 1941, 1951, 1952, 1954, 1977, 1979, 1982, 1983, 1988, 1995, 1997, 1999, 2001, 2003, 2009, 2013, 2017, 2018, 2019, 2025
Palmeiras	27	28	1920, 1926 (APEA), 1927 (APEA), 1932, 1933 (APEA), 1934 (APEA), 1936 (LFP), 1940, 1942, 1944, 1947, 1950, 1959, 1963, 1966, 1972, 1974, 1976, 1993, 1994, 1996, 2008, 2020, 2022, 2023, 2024, 2026
São Paulo	22	25	1931, 1943, 1945, 1946, 1948, 1949, 1953, 1957, 1970, 1971, 1975, 1980, 1981, 1985, 1987, 1989, 1991, 1992, 1998, 2000, 2005, 2021
Santos	22	13	1935 (LFP), 1955, 1956, 1958, 1960, 1961, 1962, 1964, 1965, 1967, 1968, 1969, 1973 (shared), 1978, 1984, 2006, 2007, 2010, 2011, 2012, 2015, 2016
Paulistano	11	10	1905, 1908, 1913 (APEA), 1916 (APEA), 1917, 1918, 1919, 1921, 1926 (LAF), 1927 (LAF), 1929 (LAF)
SPAC	4	0	1902, 1903, 1904, 1911
Portuguesa	3	4	1935 (APEA), 1936 (APEA), 1973 (shared)
AA das Palmeiras	3	0	1909, 1910, 1915 (APEA)
Germânia	2	3	1906, 1915 (LPF)
SC Americano	2	3	1912, 1913 (LPF)
SC Internacional	2	2	1907, 1928 (LAF)
Ituano	2	1	2002, 2014
AA São Bento	2	1	1914 (APEA), 1925
São Caetano	1	1	2004
Inter de Limeira	1	0	1986
Bragantino	1	0	1990
Juventus	1	0	1934 (FPF)
Albion	1	0	1933 (FPF)

=== Titles by city ===
City	Championships	Clubs
São Paulo	136	Corinthians (31), Palmeiras (27), São Paulo (22), Paulistano (11), SPAC (4), AA das Palmeiras (3), Portuguesa (3), AA São Bento (2), Germânia (2), SC Americano (2), SC Internacional (2), Albion (1), Juventus (1)
Santos	22	Santos (22)
Itu	2	Ituano (2)
Bragança Paulista	1	Bragantino (1)
Limeira	1	Inter de Limeira (1)
São Caetano do Sul	1	São Caetano (1)

=== Most appearances ===
As of 2025 season

Below is the list of clubs that have more than 40 appearances in the competition.

Club	App	First	Last
Corinthians	113	1913	2025
Palmeiras	110	1916	2025
Santos	110	1913	2025
Portuguesa	95	1920	2025
São Paulo	95	1930	2025
Juventus	73	1928	2008
Guarani	72	1927	2025
Ponte Preta	62	1928	2025
Botafogo	60	1957	2025
Portuguesa Santista	50	1929	2006
Ferroviária	48	1956	2023
Ypiranga	46	1910	1958
XV de Piracicaba	46	1949	2016
América	44	1958	2007

Notes

- Includes 2002 Supercampeonato Paulista.
- Portuguesa includes Mackenzie/Portuguesa participations (1920, 1921, 1922).
- In 1927, Corinthians has disputed both LAF and APEA championships.

== Individual records ==
=== Top scorers ===
Season	League	Player	Goals
1902	LPF	Charles Miller (SPAC)	10
1903	LPF	Herbert Boyes (SPAC)	5
1904	LPF	Charles Miller (SPAC); Hebert Boyes (SPAC)	9
1905	LPF	Hermann Friese (Germânia)	14
1906	LPF	Hermann Friese (Germânia); Léo (SC Internacional)	7
1907	LPF	Léo (SC Internacional)	8
1908	LPF	Léo (SC Internacional); Peres (Paulistano)	7
1909	LPF	Bibi (Paulistano)	11
1910	LPF	Hebert Boyes (SPAC); Eurico (AA das Palmeiras); Rubens Salles (Paulistano)	10
1911	LPF	Décio (SC Americano)	9
1912	LPF	Arthur Friedenreich (Mackenzie)	16
1913	APEA	Gilberto (AA das Palmeiras)	6
1913	LPF	Décio (SC Americano)	7
1914	APEA	Arthur Friedenreich (Ypiranga)	12
1914	LPF	Neco (Corinthians)	12
1915	APEA	Nazaré (AA das Palmeiras)	13
1915	LPF	Facchini (Campos Elíseos)	17
1916	APEA	Ary (Santos); Mariano (Paulistano); Zacchi (Ypiranga)	8
1916	LPF	Apparício (Corinthians)	7
1917	APEA	Arthur Friedenreich (Ypiranga)	20
1918	APEA	Arthur Friedenreich (Paulistano)	25
1919	APEA	Mário Andrada (Paulistano)	22
1920	APEA	Neco (Corinthians)	24
1921	APEA	Arthur Friedenreich (Paulistano)	33
1922	APEA	Gambarotta (Corinthians)	19
1923	APEA	Feitiço (AA São Bento)	18
1924	APEA	Feitiço (AA São Bento)	14
1925	APEA	Feitiço (AA São Bento)	10
1926	APEA	Araken Patusca (Santos)	13
1926	LAF	Filó (Paulistano)	16
1927	APEA	Araken Patusca (Santos)	31
1927	LAF	Arthur Friedenreich (Paulistano)	13
1928	APEA	Heitor (Palestra Itália)	16
1928	LAF	Arthur Friedenreich (Paulistano)	29
1929	APEA	Feitiço (Santos)	13
1929	LAF	Arthur Friedenreich (Paulistano); Nabor (Ponte Preta)	16
1930	APEA	Feitiço (Santos)	37
1931	APEA	Feitiço (Santos)	39
1932	APEA	Romeu (Palestra Itália)	18
1933	APEA	Waldemar de Brito (São Paulo)	21
1933	FPF	Miguel (AA das Palmeiras)	13
1934	APEA	Romeu (Palestra Itália)	13
1934	FPF	Euclydes (Fiorentino)	9
1935	APEA	Figueiredo (Ypiranga)	19
1935	LPF	Teleco (Corinthians)	9
1936	APEA	Carioca (Portuguesa)	19
1936	LFP	Teleco (Corinthians)	28
1937	LFESP	Teleco (Corinthians)	15
1938	LFESP	Elyseo (São Paulo)	13
1939	LFESP	Teleco (Corinthians)	35
1940	LFESP	Peixe (Ypiranga)	21
1941	FPF	Teleco (Corinthians)	26
1942	FPF	Mário Milani (Corinthians)	24
1943	FPF	Mário Milani (Corinthians)	20
1944	FPF	Luisinho (São Paulo)	22
1945	FPF	Passarinho (São Paulo Railway); Servílio (Corinthians)	17
1946	FPF	Servílio (Corinthians)	19
1947	FPF	Servílio (Corinthians)	20
1948	FPF	Cilas (Ypiranga)	19
1949	FPF	Friaça (São Paulo)	24
1950	FPF	Pinga (Corinthians)	22
1951	FPF	Rodolfo Carbone (Corinthians)	30
1952	FPF	Baltazar (Corinthians)	27
1953	FPF	Humberto Tozzi (Palmeiras)	22
1954	FPF	Humberto Tozzi (Palmeiras)	36
1955	FPF	Emanuele Del Vecchio (Santos)	23
1956	FPF	Paulo Pisaneschi (Corinthians)	26
1957	FPF	Pelé (Santos)	36
1958	FPF	Pelé (Santos)	58
1959	FPF	Pelé (Santos)	44
1960	FPF	Pelé (Santos)	33
1961	FPF	Pelé (Santos)	47
1962	FPF	Pelé (Santos)	37
1963	FPF	Pelé (Santos)	22
1964	FPF	Pelé (Santos)	34
1965	FPF	Pelé (Santos)	49
1966	FPF	Toninho Guerreiro (Santos)	27
1967	FPF	Flávio Minuano (Corinthians)	21
1968	FPF	Téia (Ferroviária)	20
1969	FPF	Pelé (Santos)	26
1970	FPF	Toninho Guerreiro (São Paulo)	13
1971	FPF	César Maluco (Palmeiras)	18
1972	FPF	Toninho Guerreiro (São Paulo)	17
1973	FPF	Pelé (Santos)	11
1974	FPF	Geraldão (Botafogo)	23
1975	FPF	Serginho (São Paulo)	22
1976	FPF	Sócrates (Botafogo)	15
1977	FPF	Serginho (São Paulo)	32
1978	FPF	Juary (Santos)	29
1979	FPF	Luís Fernando (América)	21
1980	FPF	Edmar (Taubaté)	17
1981	FPF	Jorge Mendonça (Guarani)	38
1982	FPF	Walter Casagrande (Corinthians)	28
1983	FPF	Serginho (Santos)	22
1984	FPF	Chiquinho (Botafogo); Serginho (Santos)	16
1985	FPF	Careca (São Paulo)	23
1986	FPF	Kita (Inter de Limeira)	23
1987	FPF	Edmar (Corinthians)	19
1988	FPF	Evair (Guarani)	19
1989	FPF	Toni (São José); Toninho (Portuguesa)	12
1990	FPF	Alberto (Ituano); Rubem (Guarani); Volnei (Ferroviária)	12
1991	FPF	Raí (São Paulo)	20
1992	FPF	Válber (Mogi Mirim)	17
1993	FPF	Viola (Corinthians)	20
1994	FPF	Evair (Palmeiras)	23
1995	FPF	Bentinho (São Paulo); Paulinho McLaren (Portuguesa)	20
1996	FPF	Giovanni (Santos)	24
1997	FPF	Dodô (São Paulo)	19
1998	FPF	França (São Paulo)	12
1999	FPF	Alex (Mogi Mirim)	12
2000	FPF	França (São Paulo)	18
2001	FPF	Washington (Ponte Preta)	16
2002	FPF	Alex Alves (Juventus)	17
2003	FPF	Luís Fabiano (São Paulo)	8
2004	FPF	Vágner Love (Palmeiras)	12
2005	FPF	Finazzi (América)	17
2006	FPF	Nilmar (Corinthians)	18
2007	FPF	Somália (São Caetano)	13
2008	FPF	Alex Mineiro (Palmeiras)	15
2009	FPF	Pedrão (Grêmio Barueri)	15
2010	FPF	Ricardo Bueno (Oeste)	16
2011	FPF	Elano (Santos); Liédson (Corinthians)	11
2012	FPF	Neymar (Santos)	20
2013	FPF	William (Ponte Preta)	13
2014	FPF	Alan Kardec (Palmeiras); Cícero (Santos); Léo Costa (Rio Claro); Luís Fabiano (São Paulo)	9
2015	FPF	Ricardo Oliveira (Santos)	11
2016	FPF	Roger (Red Bull Brasil)	11
2017	FPF	Gilberto (São Paulo); William Pottker (Ponte Preta)	9
2018	FPF	Miguel Borja (Palmeiras)	7
2019	FPF	Jean Mota (Santos)	7
2020	FPF	Ytalo (Red Bull Bragantino)	7
2021	FPF	Bruno Mezenga (Ferroviária)	9
2022	FPF	Ronaldo (Inter de Limeira)	9
2023	FPF	Giuliano Galoppo (São Paulo); Róger Guedes (Corinthians)	8
2024	FPF	José Manuel López (Palmeiras)	10
2025	FPF	Guilherme (Santos)	10
2026	FPF	Robson (Novorizontino)	7

=== All-time topscorers ===
Following is the list with the top 10 topscorers of all-time in the Campeonato Paulista:

#	Player	Years	Goals
1	Pelé	1956–1974	466
2	Arthur Friedenreich	1909–1933	338
3	Serginho	1973–1991	206
4	Feitiço	1921–1939	197
5	Heitor	1916–1931	195
6	Toninho Guerreiro	1960–1975	189
7	Cláudio	1942–1960	183
8	Pepe	1954–1969	176
9	Neco	1913–1930	167
10	Baltazar	1944–1959	156

== Top Scorers per Era ==
=== Foundation/Expansion Era (1902-1939) ===
- Arthur Friedenreich (9 seasons - 1921 - 33 goals)
- Luís Matoso (Feitiço) (6 seasons - 1931 - 39 goals)
- Heitor (2 seasons)
- Neco (2 seasons - 1920 - 24 goals)

=== Big 5 Era (1940-1989) ===
- Pele (11 seasons - 1958 - 58 goals)
- Serginho Chulapa (4 seasons - 1977 - 32 goals)
- Toninho Guerreiro (3 seasons - 1966 - 24 goals)
- Cláudio
- José Macia (Pepe)
- Baltazar (1 season)
- Jorge Mendonça (1981 - 38 goals)
- Juari (1978 - 29 goals)
- Casagrande (1982 - 28 goals)

=== Modern Era (1990-now) ===
- Giovani (1996 - 24 goals)
- Evair (1994 - 23 goals)

==== Active Players ====
- Neymar 56 total (2012 - 20 goals)
- William Bigode 29 total (0 seasons as top scorer)
- Ytalo 29 total (2020 - 7 goals)
- R Bueno 27 total (2010 - 16 goals)
- Mezenga 27 total
- Ganso 27 total
- Camilo 26 total
- Kardek 24 total
- Hernane 23 total
- Gabriel Barbosa 23 total

=== Winning managers ===
Professional era

Season	Manager
1937	Neco
1938	Armando Del Debbio
1939	Armando Del Debbio
1940	Gaetano De Domenico
1941	Armando Del Debbio
1942	Armando Del Debbio
1943	Joreca
1944	Bianco Gambini
1945	Joreca
1946	Joreca
1947	Osvaldo Brandão
1948	Vicente Feola
1949	Vicente Feola
1950	Ventura Cambón
1951	Rato Castelli
1952	Rato Castelli
1953	Jim López
1954	Osvaldo Brandão
1955	Lula
1956	Lula
1957	Béla Guttmann
1958	Lula
1959	Osvaldo Brandão
1960	Lula
1961	Lula
1962	Lula
1963	Sylvio Pirillo
1964	Lula
1965	Lula
1966	Mário Travaglini
1967	Antoninho
1968	Antoninho
1969	Antoninho
1970	Zezé Moreira
1971	Osvaldo Brandão
1972	Osvaldo Brandão
1973	Otto Glória
1973	Pepe
1974	Osvaldo Brandão
1975	José Poy
1976	Dudu
1977	Osvaldo Brandão
1978	Chico Formiga
1979	Jorge Vieira
1980	Carlos Alberto Silva
1981	Chico Formiga
1982	Mário Travaglini
1983	Jorge Vieira
1984	Castilho
1985	Cilinho
1986	Pepe
1987	Cilinho
1988	Jair Pereira
1989	Carlos Alberto Silva
1990	Vanderlei Luxemburgo
1991	Telê Santana
1992	Telê Santana
1993	Vanderlei Luxemburgo
1994	Vanderlei Luxemburgo
1995	Eduardo Amorim
1996	Vanderlei Luxemburgo
1997	Nelsinho Baptista
1998	Nelsinho Baptista
1999	Oswaldo de Oliveira
2000	Levir Culpi
2001	Vanderlei Luxemburgo
2002	Ademir Fonseca
2003	Geninho
2004	Muricy Ramalho
2005	Émerson Leão
2006	Vanderlei Luxemburgo
2007	Vanderlei Luxemburgo
2008	Vanderlei Luxemburgo
2009	Mano Menezes
2010	Dorival Júnior
2011	Muricy Ramalho
2012	Muricy Ramalho
2013	Tite
2014	Doriva
2015	Marcelo Fernandes
2016	Dorival Júnior
2017	Fábio Carille
2018	Fábio Carille
2019	Fábio Carille
2020	Vanderlei Luxemburgo
2021	Hernán Crespo
2022	Abel Ferreira
2023	Abel Ferreira
2024	Abel Ferreira
2025	Ramón Díaz
2026	Abel Ferreira

=== Annual awards ===
The awards started in 1993 by Folha de S.Paulo newspaper and then the São Paulo Football Federation took over.

Season	Best Player (Note: Best player 93–95 was determined by the percentage of votes per position.)	Best GK	Best young player	Best coach
1993		Zetti (Sao Paulo)	–	Nelsinho Baptista (Corinthians)
1994	Cesar Sampaio (Palmeiras)	Edinho (Santos)	–	Vanderlei Luxemburgo (Palmeiras)
1995	Marcelinho Carioca (Corinthians)	Ronaldo Giovanelli (Corinthians)	–	Candinho (Portuguesa)
1996	Rivaldo (Palmeiras)	Velloso (Palmeiras)	–	Vanderlei Luxemburgo (Palmeiras)
1997	Djalminha (Palmeiras)	Rogério Ceni (Sao Paulo)	–	Vanderlei Luxemburgo (Santos)
1998	Denílson (Sao Paulo)	Rogério Ceni (Sao Paulo)	–	Vanderlei Luxemburgo (Corinthians)
1999		Marcos (Palmeiras)
2000				Levir Culpi (Sao Paulo)
2004		Rogério Ceni (Sao Paulo)
2005		Fábio Costa (Santos)		Vanderlei Luxemburgo (Santos)
2007	Zé Roberto (Santos)	Fábio Costa (Santos)	David Braz (Palmeiras)	Vanderlei Luxemburgo (Santos)
2008	Jorge Valdivia (Palmeiras)	Felipe (Corinthians)	Dentinho (Corinthians)	Vanderlei Luxemburgo (Palmeiras)
2009	Ronaldo (Corinthians)	Felipe (Corinthians)	Neymar (Santos)	Mano Menezes (Corinthians)
2010	Neymar (Santos)	Júlio César (Santo André)	Bruno Cesar (Santo André)	Dorival Júnior (Santos)
2011	Neymar (Santos)	Rogério Ceni (Sao Paulo)	Lucas Moura (Sao Paulo)	Luiz Felipe Scolari (Palmeiras)
2012	Neymar (Santos)	Rafael Cabral (Santos)	Romarinho (Bragantino)	Vadão (Guarani)
2013	Neymar (Santos)	Rafael Cabral (Santos)	Rodrigo Biro (Penapolense )	Dado Cavalcanti (Mogi Mirim)
2014	Cícero Santos (Santos)	Fernando Prass (Palmeiras)	Geuvânio (Santos)	Oswaldo de Oliveira (Santos)
2015	Ricardo Oliveira (Santos)	Fernando Prass (Palmeiras)	Rafael Longuine (Audax)	Oswaldo de Oliveira (Palmeiras)
2016	Lucas Lima (Santos)	Vanderlei (Santos)	Tchê Tchê (Audax)	Fernando Diniz (Audax)
2017	William Pottker (Ponte Preta)	Aranha (Ponte Preta)	Clayson (Ponte Preta)	Fábio Carille (Corinthians)
2018	Jailson (Palmeiras)	Jailson (Palmeiras)	Rodrygo (Santos)	Roger Machado (Palmeiras)
2019	Jean Mota (Santos)	Cássio (Corinthians)	Gabriel Martinelli (Ituano)	Antônio Carlos Zago (Red Bull Brasil)
2021	Martín Benítez (São Paulo)	Weverton (Palmeiras)	Renan (Palmeiras)	Hernán Crespo (São Paulo)
2022	Dudu (Palmeiras)	Weverton (Palmeiras)	Pablo Maia (Sao Paulo)	Rogério Ceni (Sao Paulo)
2023	Raphael Veiga (Palmeiras)	Weverton (Palmeiras)	Chrystian Barletta (São Bernardo)	Thiago Carpini (Água Santa)
2024	Endrick (Palmeiras)	João Paulo (Santos)	Rômulo (Novorizontino)	Abel Ferreira (Palmeiras)
2025	Yuri Alberto (Corinthians)	Hugo Souza (Corinthians)	Vinicinho (Red Bull Bragantino)	Ramón Díaz (Corinthians)
2026	Flaco Lopez (Palmeiras)	Carlos Miguel (Palmeiras)	Andre (Corinthians)	Abel Ferreira (Palmeiras)

== Campeonato Paulista do Interior ==
=== Format ===
The competition, held from 2007 to 2023, was played in two-legged semi-finals and final by the four best placed countryside São Paulo state clubs that did not reach the semi-final stage of the Campeonato Paulista in the season. Which in turn, is the 5th to 8th place of the first stage of Campeonato Paulista, except the teams from the city of São Paulo and also including Santos.

=== Past tournaments ===
==== Winners ====
Season	Winner	Runner-up
2007	Guaratinguetá	Noroeste
2008	Grêmio Barueri	Noroeste
2009	Ponte Preta	Grêmio Barueri
2010	Botafogo	São Caetano
2011	Oeste	Ponte Preta
2012	Mogi Mirim	Bragantino
2013	Ponte Preta	Penapolense
2014	Penapolense	Botafogo
2015	Ponte Preta	Red Bull Brasil
2016	Not held	
2017	Ituano	Santo André
2018	Ponte Preta	Mirassol
2019	Red Bull Brasil	Ponte Preta
2020	Red Bull Bragantino	Guarani
2021	Novorizontino	Ponte Preta
2022	Ituano	Botafogo
2023	São Bernardo	Mirassol

=== Titles by club ===
Club	Winners	Runners-up	Winning years
Ponte Preta	4	2	2009, 2013, 2015, 2018
Ituano	2	0	2017, 2022
Botafogo	1	2	2010
Grêmio Barueri	1	1	2008
Penapolense	1	1	2014
Red Bull Brasil	1	1	2019
Red Bull Bragantino	1	1	2020
Guaratinguetá	1	0	2007
Oeste	1	0	2011
Mogi Mirim	1	0	2012
Novorizontino	1	0	2021
São Bernardo	1	0	2023
Mirassol	0	2	
Noroeste	0	2	
Santo André	0	1	
São Caetano	0	1	
Guarani	0	1	

== See also ==
- Campeonato Paulista Série A2
- Campeonato Paulista Série A3
- Campeonato Paulista Série A4
- Campeonato Paulista Segunda Divisão
- Campeonato Paulista Série B3
- Federação Paulista de Futebol
