= 1903 Campeonato Paulista =

Campeonato Paulista
- Season: 1903
- Champions: São Paulo Athletic
- Matches played: 21
- Goals scored: 64 (3.05 per match)
- Top goalscorer: Álvaro Rocha (Paulistano); Herbert Boyes (São Paulo Athletic) – 4 goals
- Biggest home win: Paulistano 5–0 Internacional (June 28, 1903); São Paulo A.C. 5–0 Internacional (July 5, 1903); Mackenzie 5-0 Internacional (September 20, 1903)
- Biggest away win: Internacional 0-3 Paulistano (July 26, 1903); Germânia 0-3 Mackenzie (September 7, 1903); Internacional 0-3 São Paulo A.C. (September 27, 1903)
- Highest scoring: Internacional 4–3 Germânia (August 30, 1903)

The 1903 Campeonato Paulista, organized by the LPF (Liga Paulista de Football), was the 2nd season of São Paulo's top association football league. São Paulo Athletic won the title for the 2nd time. No teams were relegated. The top scorers were Paulistano's Álvaro Rocha and São Paulo Athletic's Herbert Boyes with 4 goals each.

== System ==
The championship was disputed in a double-round robin system, with the team with the most points winning the title.

== Championship ==
Pos	Team	Pld	W	D	L	GF	GA	GD	Pts	Qualification or relegation
1	São Paulo Athletic	8	6	1	1	21	5	+16	13	Playoffs
2	Paulistano	8	6	1	1	14	4	+10	13	Playoffs
3	Mackenzie	8	3	1	4	10	8	+2	7	
4	Internacional	8	2	0	6	8	27	−19	4	
5	Germânia	8	1	1	6	8	17	−9	3	

Updated to match(es) played on October 12, 1903. Source: RSSSF.com
Rules for classification: 1) points; 2) goal difference; 3) wins; 4) head-to-head points.

=== Finals ===
25 October 1903

São Paulo Athletic	2 – 1	Paulistano
Thiers (o.g.); Poole		Álvaro Rocha

Velódromo Paulistano, São Paulo
Referee: Egídio de Souza Aranha
