= Clube Atlético Internacional =

CA Internacional
- Full name: Clube Atlético Internacional
- Founded: 1902
- Dissolved: 1910
- Ground: Avenida Ana Costa
- League: Campeonato Paulista
Home colours

Clube Atlético Internacional, C. A. Internacional or simply CA Internacional was a football club based in Santos, Brazil. It was beside Sport Club Americano, the first club from outside the city of São Paulo to compete in an edition of the Campeonato Paulista, in 1906. It was founded on November 2, 1902, by Henrique Porchat, responsible for introducing football in the coastal city. It ended its activities in 1910 and part of its dissidents founded the current Santos Futebol Clube, preserving the same colors used by CA Internacional (black and white)

The team has represented Brazil before the Brazil national football team had established, playing matches against Argentina and Uruguay.

== Participations ==
- Campeonato Paulista:
  - 3 (1906, 1907, 1908)

== Honours ==
- Campeonato Citadino de Santos:
  - Winners (2): 1903, 1904
