= 1919 Campeonato Paulista =

Football League

Campeonato Paulista
- Season: 1919
- Champions: Paulistano
- Matches played: 84
- Goals scored: 384 (4.57 per match)
- Top goalscorer: Arthur Friedenreich (Ypiranga) – 26 goals
- Biggest home win: Ypiranga 9-1 AA das Palmeiras (October 26, 1919)
- Biggest away win: Minas Gerais 2-9 São Bento (July 13, 1919); Santos 1-8 AA das Palmeiras (December 7, 1919); Mackenzie 0-7 Palestra Itália (December 7, 1919)
- Highest scoring: Minas Gerais 2-9 São Bento (July 13, 1919)

The 1919 Campeonato Paulista, organized by the APEA (Associação Paulista de Esportes Atléticos), was the 18th season of São Paulo's top association football league. Paulistano won the title for the 7th time. The top scorer was Ypiranga's Arthur Friedenreich with 26 goals.

== System ==
The championship was organized in a double-round robin system, with the team with the most points winning the title. The second round matches between the four bottom teams weren't held.

== Championship ==
Pos	Team	Pld	W	D	L	GF	GA	GD	Pts	Qualification or relegation
1	Paulistano	18	14	2	2	62	19	+43	30	Champions
2	Palestra Itália	18	14	1	3	59	21	+38	29	
3	Corinthians	18	12	2	4	51	16	+35	26	
4	Ypiranga	18	11	3	4	56	34	+22	25	
5	São Bento	18	7	2	9	38	44	−6	16	
6	Santos	18	6	1	11	36	43	−7	13	
7	Internacional	15	3	5	7	26	44	−18	11	
8	Minas Gerais	15	4	2	9	18	49	−31	10	
9	AA das Palmeiras	15	3	0	12	27	57	−30	6	
10	Mackenzie	15	1	0	14	11	57	−46	2	

Updated to match(es) played on December 21, 1919. Source: RSSSF.com
Rules for classification: 1) points; 2) goal difference; 3) wins; 4) head-to-head points.
