= 1910 Campeonato Paulista =

Campeonato Paulista
- Season: 1910
- Champions: AA das Palmeiras
- Matches played: 33
- Goals scored: 154 (4.67 per match)
- Top goalscorer: Eurico (AA das Palmeiras); Rubens Salles (Paulistano); Herbert Boyes (São Paulo Athletic) – 10 goals
- Biggest home win: São Paulo A.C. 6–1 Germânia (July 3, 1910)
- Biggest away win: Ypiranga 0–8 AA das Palmeiras (August 7, 1910)
- Highest scoring: AA das Palmeiras 6–2 Germânia (July 17, 1910); Ypiranga 0–8 AA das Palmeiras (August 7, 1910)

The 1910 Campeonato Paulista, organized by the LPF (Liga Paulista de Football), was the 9th season of São Paulo's top association football league. AA das Palmeiras won the title for the 2nd time. No teams were relegated. AA das Palmeiras's Eurico, Paulistano's Rubens Salles and São Paulo Athletic's Herbert Boyes were the top scorers, each having scored 10 goals.

== System ==
The championship was disputed in a double-round robin system, with the team with the most points winning the title.

== Championship ==
=== Qualifying tournament ===
After Internacional's expulsion from the league, three teams applied for membership in the league: Ypiranga and AA Vila Buarque, both from São Paulo, and SC Savóia, from Sorocaba. the three disputed a qualifying tournament, disputed in a single round-robin format, to define who would participate in the championship.

Pos	Team	Pld	W	D	L	GF	GA	GD	Pts	Qualification or relegation
1	Ypiranga	2	2	0	0	9	4	+5	4	Qualified
2	Vila Buarque	2	1	0	1	5	7	−2	2	
3	Savóia	2	0	0	2	4	7	−3	0	

Updated to match(es) played on April 24, 1910. Source: RSSSF.com
Rules for classification: 1) points; 2) goal difference; 3) wins; 4) head-to-head points.

=== Championship ===
Pos	Team	Pld	W	D	L	GF	GA	GD	Pts	Qualification or relegation
1	AA das Palmeiras	10	9	0	1	43	12	+31	18	Champions
2	Americano	10	7	0	3	25	18	+7	16 (Note: Americano won the points of a 2–1 loss to Paulistano.)	
3	São Paulo Athletic	10	5	1	4	24	26	−2	11	
4	Paulistano	10	4	2	4	19	17	+2	8	
5	Ypiranga	10	1	2	7	11	32	−21	4	
6	Germânia	10	1	1	8	14	31	−17	3	

Updated to match(es) played on November 20, 1910. Source: RSSSF.com
Rules for classification: 1) points; 2) goal difference; 3) wins; 4) head-to-head points.
