= 1902 Campeonato Paulista =

Campeonato Paulista
- Season: 1902
- Champions: São Paulo Athletic
- Matches played: 21
- Goals scored: 60 (2.86 per match)
- Top goalscorer: Charles Miller (São Paulo Athletic) – 10 goals
- Biggest home win: São Paulo A.C. 4–0 Paulistano (May 8, 1902); São Paulo A.C. 4–0 Germânia (July 20, 1902)
- Biggest away win: Germânia 0-3 São Paulo A.C. (August 3, 1902); Mackenzie 0-3 Paulistano (October 4, 1902)
- Highest scoring: Mackenzie 4–4 São Paulo A.C. (September 20, 1902)

The 1902 Campeonato Paulista, organized by the LPF (Liga Paulista de Football), was the 1st season of São Paulo's top association football league. São Paulo Athletic won the title for the 1st time. No teams were relegated. São Paulo Athletic's Charles Miller was the top scorer with 10 goals.

== System ==
The championship was disputed in a double-round robin system, with the team with the most points winning the title.

== Championship ==
Pos	Team	Pld	W	D	L	GF	GA	GD	Pts	Qualification or relegation
1	São Paulo Athletic	8	5	2	1	21	5	+16	12	Playoffs
2	Paulistano	8	5	2	1	14	8	+6	12	Playoffs
3	Mackenzie	8	3	3	2	13	15	−2	9	
4	Germânia	8	1	2	5	5	15	−10	4	
5	Internacional	8	0	3	5	4	14	−10	3	

Updated to match(es) played on October 25, 1902. Source: RSSSF.com
Rules for classification: 1) points; 2) goal difference; 3) wins; 4) head-to-head points.

=== Finals ===
26 October 1902

São Paulo Athletic	2 – 1	Paulistano
Charles Miller	Report	Álvaro Rocha

Velódromo Paulistano, São Paulo
Attendance: c. 4,000
Referee: Egídio de Souza Aranha
