= 1913 Campeonato Paulista =

In the 1913 season of the Campeonato Paulista, two championships were played, each by a different league.

== APSA Championship ==
Campeonato Paulista
- Season: 1913
- Champions: Paulistano
- Matches: 9
- Goals: 36 (4 per match)
- Top goalscorer: José Pedro (Mackenzie); Francisco Mesquita (Paulistano); Luiz (AA das Palmeiras) – 3 goals
- Biggest home win: Mackenzie 5-0 Paulistano (August 15, 1913)
- Biggest away win: AA das Palmeiras 1-2 Paulistano (July 6, 1913)
- Highest scoring: AA das Palmeiras 5-2 Mackenzie (July 14, 1913)

Before the start of the 1913 championship, a split happened within the LPF - Paulistano left the league, uncomfortable with the growing inclusion of lower-class teams, like Ypiranga and the recently joined Corinthians, in the league, in addition to the fact that the league moved its official playing field to the Parque da Antarctica Paulista (which was used by Germânia), in detriment to their own stadium, the Velódromo Paulistano, and was joined by AA das Palmeiras and Mackenzie. The new league would be called the APSA (Associação Paulista de Sports Athleticos). Paulistano won the title for the 3rd time. Three players shared the top scorer position, with 3 goals each.

=== System ===
The championship was disputed in a triple-round robin system, with the team with the most points winning the title.

=== Championship ===
Pos	Team	Pld	W	D	L	GF	GA	GD	Pts	Qualification or relegation
1	Paulistano	6	3	1	2	8	13	−5	7	Champions
2	Mackenzie	6	3	0	3	16	12	+4	6	
3	AA das Palmeiras	6	2	1	3	12	11	+1	5	

Updated to match(es) played on October 11, 1913. Source: RSSSF.com
Rules for classification: 1) points; 2) goal difference; 3) wins; 4) head-to-head points.

== LPF Championship ==
Campeonato Paulista
- Season: 1913
- Champions: Americano
- Matches: 25
- Goals: 97 (3.88 per match)
- Top goalscorer: Décio Viccari (Americano) – 7 goals
- Biggest home win: Americano 7-1 Corinthians (May 25, 1913); Germânia 8-2 Santos (June 1, 1913)
- Biggest away win: Corinthians 3-6 Santos (June 22, 1913); Germânia 0-3 Americano (September 14, 1913)
- Highest scoring: Germânia 8-2 Santos (June 1, 1913)

The edition of the 1913 Campeonato Paulista organized by the LPF (Liga Paulista de Football) ended with Americano winning the title for the 2nd time. the top scorer was Americano's Décio Viccari with 7 goals.

=== System ===
The championship was disputed in a double-round robin system, with the team with the most points winning the title.

=== Championship ===
Pos	Team	Pld	W	D	L	GF	GA	GD	Pts	Qualification or relegation
1	Americano	9	6	3	0	30	6	+24	15	Champions
2	Ypiranga	9	4	3	2	10	8	+2	11	
3	Internacional	9	4	2	3	19	14	+5	10	
4	Germânia	9	3	0	6	17	25	−8	6	
5	Corinthians	9	1	4	4	11	22	−11	6	
6	Santos	5	1	0	4	10	22	−12	2 (Note: Santos abandoned the championship before concluding the first round.)	Withdrew

Updated to match(es) played on October 26, 1913. Source: RSSSF.com
Rules for classification: 1) points; 2) goal difference; 3) wins; 4) head-to-head points.
