= 1918 Campeonato Paulista =

Campeonato Paulista
- Season: 1918
- Champions: Paulistano
- Matches played: 67
- Goals scored: 332 (4.96 per match)
- Top goalscorer: Arthur Friedenreich (Paulistano) – 25 goals
- Biggest home win: Paulistano 11-0 Minas Gerais (September 29, 1918)
- Biggest away win: Minas Gerais 0-7 Corinthians (June 30, 1918)
- Highest scoring: Paulistano 11-0 Minas Gerais (September 29, 1918)

The 1918 Campeonato Paulista, organized by the APEA (Associação Paulista de Esportes Atléticos), was the 17th season of São Paulo's top association football league. After the sixth round, Palestra Itália abandoned the championship in protest against the refereeing in their match against Paulistano. Then, the championship was interrupted in October, when the Spanish flu hit Brazil, and did not resume until December. As a result, multiple matches that did not have any bearing on deciding the title were cancelled and the championship only ended in January 1919. Paulistano won the title for the 6th time. The top scorer was Paulistano's Arthur Friedenreich, with 25 goals.

== System ==
The championship was disputed in a double-round robin system, with the team with the most points winning the title.

== Championship ==
Pos	Team	Pld	W	D	L	GF	GA	GD	Pts	Qualification or relegation
1	Paulistano	16	13	0	3	68	14	+54	26	Champions
2	Corinthians	17	12	2	3	64	19	+45	26	
3	AA das Palmeiras	16	10	2	4	36	25	+11	22	
4	Santos	13	7	4	2	42	26	+16	18	
5	Ypiranga	13	6	0	7	22	38	−16	12	
6	São Bento	14	5	2	7	43	40	+3	12	
7	Minas Gerais	13	2	1	10	9	53	−44	5	
8	Internacional	15	2	0	13	17	66	−49	4	
9	Mackenzie	11	2	0	9	17	38	−21	4	
10	Palestra Itália	6	2	1	3	14	13	+1	5	Withdrew

Updated to match(es) played on January 19, 1919. Source: RSSSF.com
Rules for classification: 1) points; 2) goal difference; 3) wins; 4) head-to-head points.
