= 1908 Campeonato Paulista =

Campeonato Paulista
- Season: 1908
- Champions: Paulistano
- Matches played: 24
- Goals scored: 88 (3.67 per match)
- Top goalscorer: Leônidas (Internacional); Peres (Paulistano) – 7 goals
- Biggest home win: Americano 4-0 Internacional de Santos (June 14, 1908)
- Biggest away win: São Paulo A.C. 0-7 Germânia (November 2, 1908)
- Highest scoring: São Paulo A.C. 3-9 Paulistano (September 8, 1908)

The 1908 Campeonato Paulista, organized by the LPF (Liga Paulista de Football), was the 7th season of São Paulo's top association football league. Paulistano won the title for the 2nd time. No teams were relegated. Internacional's Leônidas and Paulistano's Peres were the top scorers, with 7 goals apiece.

== System ==
The championship was disputed in a double-round robin system, with the team with the most points winning the title.

== Championship ==
Pos	Team	Pld	W	D	L	GF	GA	GD	Pts	Qualification or relegation
1	Paulistano	10	6	3	1	24	17	+7	15	Champions
2	Germânia	10	6	2	2	22	8	+14	14	
3	Americano	10	6	2	2	15	10	+5	14	
4	Internacional	10	5	3	2	20	10	+10	13	
5	São Paulo Athletic	10	2	0	8	7	27	−20	4	1909 Selective Tournament
6	Internacional de Santos	10	0	0	10	0	14	−14	0	1909 Selective Tournament

Updated to match(es) played on November 22, 1908. Source: RSSSF.com
Rules for classification: 1) points; 2) goal difference; 3) wins; 4) head-to-head points.
