= 1922 Campeonato Paulista =

Football League

Campeonato Paulista
- Season: 1922
- Champions: Corinthians
- Matches: 94
- Goals: 390 (4.15 per match)
- Top goalscorer: Gambarotta (Corinthians) – 19 goals
- Biggest home win: Corinthians 9-0 Internacional (November 5, 1922)
- Biggest away win: Mackenzie-Portuguesa 0-9 Corinthians (June 25, 1922)
- Highest scoring: Corinthians 6-3 AA das Palmeiras (May 28, 1922); Mackenzie-Portuguesa 0-9 Corinthians (June 25, 1922); Corinthians 9-0 Internacional (November 5, 1922); Minas Gerais 2-7 Corinthians (January 23, 1923)

The 1922 Campeonato Paulista, organized by the APEA (Associação Paulista de Esportes Atléticos), was the 21st season of São Paulo's top association football league. Corinthians won the title for the 3rd time. The top scorer was Corinthians's Gambarotta, with 19 goals.

== System ==
The championship was disputed in two stages:

- First round: All clubs played each other in a single round-robin system. The eight best teams qualified to the Second round.
- Second round: The remaining eight clubs played each other in a single round-robin system. The team with the most points in the sum of both rounds won the title.

== Championship ==
=== First round ===
Pos	Team	Pld	W	D	L	GF	GA	GD	Pts	Qualification or relegation
1	Corinthians	11	9	1	1	50	14	+36	19	Qualified
2	Sírio	11	8	2	1	28	14	+14	18	Qualified
3	Palestra Itália	11	8	1	2	32	14	+18	17	Qualified
4	Paulistano	11	7	1	3	32	18	+14	15	Qualified
5	AA das Palmeiras	11	4	3	4	26	20	+6	11	Qualified
6	Minas Gerais	11	5	1	5	15	29	−14	11	Qualified
7	São Bento	11	5	0	6	19	11	+8	10	Qualified
8	Ypiranga	11	3	4	4	17	18	−1	10	Qualified
9	Germânia	11	3	1	7	16	36	−20	7	
10	Mackenzie-Portuguesa	11	3	0	8	15	33	−18	6	
11	Santos	11	2	1	8	17	31	−14	5	
12	Internacional	11	1	1	9	10	39	−29	3	

Updated to match(es) played on December 10, 1922. Source: RSSSF.com
Rules for classification: 1) points; 2) goal difference; 3) wins; 4) head-to-head points.

=== Second round ===
Pos	Team	Pld	W	D	L	GF	GA	GD	Pts
1	Palestra Itália	7	6	0	1	16	10	+6	12
2	Corinthians	7	5	1	1	22	5	+17	11
3	Sírio	7	3	2	2	16	13	+3	8
4	Paulistano	7	3	1	3	19	16	+3	7
5	AA das Palmeiras	7	3	1	3	11	9	+2	7
6	Ypiranga	7	2	1	4	15	16	−1	5
7	Minas Gerais	7	1	1	5	10	25	−15	3
8	São Bento	7	1	1	5	6	21	−15	3

Updated to match(es) played on February 4, 1923. Source: RSSSF.com
Rules for classification: 1) points; 2) goal difference; 3) wins; 4) head-to-head points.

=== Final standings ===
Pos	Team	Pld	W	D	L	GF	GA	GD	Pts	Qualification or relegation
1	Corinthians	18	14	2	2	72	19	+53	30	Champions
2	Palestra Itália	18	14	1	3	48	24	+24	29	
3	Sírio	18	11	4	3	44	27	+17	26	
4	Paulistano	18	10	2	6	51	34	+17	22	
5	AA das Palmeiras	18	7	4	7	37	29	+8	18	
6	Ypiranga	18	5	5	8	32	34	−2	15	
7	Minas Gerais	18	6	2	10	25	54	−29	14	
8	São Bento	18	6	1	11	25	32	−7	13	
9	Germânia	11	3	1	7	16	36	−20	7	
10	Mackenzie-Portuguesa	11	3	0	8	15	33	−18	6	
11	Santos	11	2	1	8	17	31	−14	5	
12	Internacional	11	1	1	9	10	39	−29	3	

Updated to match(es) played on February 4, 1923. Source: RSSSF.com
Rules for classification: 1) points; 2) goal difference; 3) wins; 4) head-to-head points.
