= Velloso =

Velloso is a surname. Notable people with the surname include:

- Osvaldo Velloso de Barros (1908–1996), Brazilian footballer
- Wagner Fernando Velloso (born 1968), Brazilian footballer, manager, and commentator

== See also ==
- Veloso
