= 1928 Campeonato Paulista =

The 1928 Campeonato Paulista was the 27th season of São Paulo's top association football league. Two championships were disputed that season, each by a different league (APEA and LAF).

== APEA Championship ==
Campeonato Paulista (APEA)
- Season: 1928
- Champions: Corinthians (6th title)
- Top goalscorer: Heitor (Palestra Itália) – 16 goals

In the edition organized by the APEA (Associação Paulista de Esportes Atléticos), Corinthians won the title for the 6th time. No teams were relegated and the top scorer was Heitor with 16 goals.

=== System ===
The championship was disputed in a double round-robin system, with the team with the most points winning the title.

=== Championship ===
Pos	Team	Pld	W	D	L	GF	GA	GD	Pts	Qualification or relegation
1	Corinthians	12	10	1	1	41	12	+29	21	Champions
2	Santos	12	9	1	2	42	12	+30	19	
3	Palestra Itália	12	8	2	2	45	16	+29	18	
4	Guarani	12	5	1	6	28	24	+4	11	
5	Portuguesa	12	3	1	8	12	35	−23	7	
6	Ypiranga	12	2	1	9	15	47	−32	5	
7	Sírio	12	1	1	10	7	44	−37	3	
8	Comercial (RP)	0	0	0	0	0	0	0	0	Disqualified

Updated to match(es) played on May 21, 2022. Source: RSSSF.com
Rules for classification: 1) points; 2) goal difference; 3) wins; 4) head-to-head points.

== LAF Championship ==
Campeonato Paulista (LAF)
- Season: 1928
- Champions: SC Internacional (2nd title)
- Top goalscorer: Friedenreich (Paulistano) – 29 goals

In the edition organized by the LAF (Liga dos Amadores de Futebol), SC Internacional won the title for the 2nd time. no teams were relegated and the top scorer was Friedenreich with 29 goals.

=== System ===
The championship was disputed in a double round-robin system, with the team with the most points winning the title.

=== Championship ===
Pos	Team	Pld	W	D	L	GF	GA	GD	Pts	Qualification or relegation
1	SC Internacional	23	15	5	3	63	32	+31	35	Champions
2	Paulistano	23	15	3	5	61	24	+37	33	
3	Ponte Preta	22	13	4	5	60	37	+23	30	
4	Hespanha	22	13	4	5	52	38	+14	30	
5	Atlético Santista	22	10	6	6	57	31	+26	26	
6	AA São Bento	22	9	5	8	41	40	+1	23	
7	Independência/Sant'Anna	22	8	2	12	50	58	−8	18	
8	Antarctica	22	6	6	10	40	54	−14	18	
9	Paulista	22	7	3	12	29	43	−14	17	
10	Germânia	22	5	3	14	48	66	−18	13	
11	União Lapa	22	5	2	15	28	86	−58	12	
12	AA das Palmeiras	22	4	3	15	35	55	−20	11	

Updated to match(es) played on 21 May 2022. Source: RSSSF.com
Rules for classification: 1) points; 2) goal difference; 3) wins; 4) head-to-head points.
