= 1924 Campeonato Paulista =

Campeonato Paulista
- Season: 1924
- Champions: Corinthians (5th title)
- Top goalscorer: Feitiço (AA São Bento) – 14 goals

The 1924 Campeonato Paulista was the 23rd season of São Paulo's top association football league. The edition was organized by the APEA (Associação Paulista de Esportes Atléticos) from April 20, 1924, to January 18, 1925. The top scorer was Feitiço with 14 goals.

== System ==
The championship was disputed in two rounds. The first is a single round-robin system, classifying the eight better placed teams. Into the second round, another round-robin, with the team with the most points winning the title.

== Championship ==
Pos	Team	Pld	W	D	L	GF	GA	GD	Pts	Qualification or relegation
1	Corinthians	17	12	1	4	46	23	+23	25	Champions
2	Paulistano	17	10	3	4	31	15	+16	23	
3	AA São Bento	17	9	4	4	30	20	+10	22	
4	Santos	17	9	3	5	44	29	+15	21	
5	Ypiranga	17	9	2	6	29	24	+5	20	
6	Sírio	17	6	5	6	29	26	+3	17	
7	Braz	17	3	5	9	24	41	−17	11	
8	Portuguesa	17	3	3	11	18	39	−21	9	
9	AA das Palmeiras	10	4	0	6	22	27	−5	8	
10	Germânia	10	3	1	6	16	21	−5	7	
11	SC Internacional	10	0	3	7	8	32	−24	3	
12	Palestra Itália	0	0	0	0	0	0	0	0	Withdrew

Updated to match(es) played on June 3, 2022. Source: RSSSF.com
Rules for classification: 1) points; 2) goal difference; 3) wins; 4) head-to-head points.
