= 1929 Campeonato Paulista =

The 1929 Campeonato Paulista was the 28th season of São Paulo's top association football league. Two championships were disputed that season, each by a different league (APEA and LAF).

== APEA Championship ==
Campeonato Paulista (APEA)
- Season: 1929
- Champions: Corinthians (7th title)
- Top goalscorer: Feitiço (Santos) – 13 goals

In the edition organized by the APEA (Associação Paulista de Esportes Atléticos), Corinthians won the title for the 7th time. No teams were relegated. The top scorer was Feitiço with 13 goals.

=== System ===
The championship was disputed in a single round-robin system, with the team with the most points winning the title.

=== Championship ===
| Pos | Team | Pld | W | D | L | GF | GA | GD | Pts | Qualification or relegation |
|---|---|---|---|---|---|---|---|---|---|---|
| 1 | Corinthians | 7 | 7 | 0 | 0 | 33 | 8 | +25 | 14 | Champions |
| 2 | Santos | 7 | 5 | 1 | 1 | 30 | 13 | +17 | 11 | |
| 3 | Palestra Itália | 7 | 4 | 2 | 1 | 21 | 11 | +10 | 10 | |
| 4 | Portuguesa | 7 | 3 | 2 | 2 | 20 | 22 | −2 | 8 | |
| 5 | Guarani | 7 | 2 | 2 | 3 | 15 | 15 | 0 | 6 | |
| 6 | Sírio | 7 | 1 | 1 | 5 | 9 | 21 | −12 | 3 | |
| 7 | Siléx | 7 | 1 | 0 | 6 | 8 | 26 | −18 | 2 | |
| 8 | Ypiranga | 7 | 1 | 0 | 6 | 8 | 28 | −20 | 2 | |

Updated to match(es) played on May 21, 2022. Source: RSSSF.com
Rules for classification: 1) points; 2) goal difference; 3) wins; 4) head-to-head points.

== LAF Championship ==
Campeonato Paulista (LAF)
- Season: 1929
- Champions: Paulistano (11th tille)
- Top goalscorer: Friedenreich (Paulistano); Nabor (Ponte Preta) – 16 goals

The edition organized by the LAF (Liga dos Amadores de Futebol) in 1929, is the last edition of amateur level of football in São Paulo realized. After this championship, the most successful club and current champions Paulistano withdrew and never returned to football.

=== System ===
The championship was disputed in a double round-robin format, with the team with the less points losts criteria winning the title.

=== Championship ===
| Pos | Team | Pld | W | D | L | GF | GA | GD | Pts | Qualification or relegation |
|---|---|---|---|---|---|---|---|---|---|---|
| 1 | Paulistano | 19 | 14 | 2 | 3 | 53 | 15 | +38 | 30 | Champions |
| 2 | SC Internacional | 18 | 9 | 5 | 4 | 34 | 23 | +11 | 23 | |
| 3 | Ponte Preta | 20 | 12 | 2 | 6 | 55 | 36 | +19 | 26 | |
| 4 | Hespanha | 20 | 8 | 6 | 6 | 46 | 35 | +11 | 22 | |
| 5 | Germânia | 18 | 8 | 2 | 8 | 38 | 45 | −7 | 18 | Withdrew before the end of the championship |
| 6 | Independência | 20 | 8 | 5 | 7 | 42 | 37 | +5 | 21 | |
| 7 | Atlético Santista | 19 | 7 | 5 | 7 | 34 | 28 | +6 | 19 | |
| 8 | AA São Bento | 19 | 5 | 6 | 8 | 20 | 32 | −12 | 16 | |
| 9 | AA das Palmeiras | 17 | 5 | 1 | 11 | 28 | 50 | −22 | 11 | Withdrew before the end of the championship |
| 10 | Portuguesa Santista | 21 | 7 | 4 | 10 | 37 | 40 | −3 | 18 | |
| 11 | Antarctica | 21 | 5 | 7 | 9 | 30 | 47 | −17 | 17 | |
| 12 | Paulista | 20 | 5 | 1 | 14 | 29 | 58 | −29 | 11 | |

Updated to match(es) played on 21 May 2022. Source: RSSSF.com
Rules for classification: 1) less points lost; 2) points gained; 3) goal difference; 4) wins; 5) head-to-head points.
