= Alex Alves (footballer, born 1975) =

Brazilian footballer

Personal information
- Full name: Alexandro Alves Ferreira
- Date of birth: 3 July 1975 (age 51)
- Place of birth: Barbosa Ferraz, Brazil
- Height: 1.71 m (5 ft 7 in)
- Position: Striker

Senior career*
Years	Team	Apps	(Gls)
1996–2001	Juventus-SP		
2001	Bahia	2	(1)
2002–2003	Portuguesa	17	(4)
2003–2006	Cruzeiro	10	(1)
2004–2005	→ Botafogo (loan)	46	(16)
2006	→ Denizlispor (loan)	10	(1)
2006	Portuguesa	1	(1)
2007	Juventude	9	(0)
2008	Mirassol	0	(0)
2008	Brasiliense	0	(0)
2009	Madureira	2	(1)
2009–2010	Juventus-SP		
Total		97	(25)

Managerial career
- 2018–2020: Juventus-SP
- 2021: Cascavel CR
- 2021: Atibaia
- 2021: Portuguesa
- 2022: Audax Rio
- 2022: Sertãozinho
- 2023: Audax
- * Club domestic league appearances and goals

Alexandro Alves Ferreira (born 3 July 1975), known as Alex Alves, is a Brazilian football manager and former player who played as a striker.

== Career ==
Born in Barbosa Ferraz, he spent many season at various clubs from São Paulo state. He signed a three-year contract with Cruzeiro in July 2003, but spent one loan to Botafogo and Denizlispor for two and a half season. He later signed a contract with Madureira.
