= 1923 Campeonato Paulista =

Football League

Campeonato Paulista
- Season: 1923
- Champions: Corinthians
- Matches: 91
- Goals: 330 (3.63 per match)
- Top goalscorer: Feitiço (São Bento) – 18 goals
- Biggest home win: São Bento 9-1 AA das Palmeiras (September 16, 1923)
- Biggest away win: Internacional 0-9 Corinthians (May 6, 1923)
- Highest scoring: AA das Palmeiras 7-3 Germânia (May 6, 1923); São Bento 9-1 AA das Palmeiras (September 16, 1923)

The 1923 Campeonato Paulista, organized by the APEA (Associação Paulista de Esportes Atléticos), was the 22nd season of São Paulo's top association football league. Corinthians won the title for the 4th time. The top scorer was São Bento's Feitiço, with 18 goals.

== System ==
The championship was disputed in two stages:

- First round: All clubs played each other in a single round-robin system. The eight best teams qualified to the Second round.
- Second round: The remaining eight clubs played each other in a single round-robin system. The team with the most points in the sum of both rounds won the title.

== Championship ==
=== First round ===
Pos	Team	Pld	W	D	L	GF	GA	GD	Pts	Qualification or relegation
1	Corinthians	11	10	1	0	39	9	+30	21	Qualified
2	Palestra Itália	11	6	2	3	27	17	+10	14	Qualified
3	Sírio	11	5	3	3	16	12	+4	13	Qualified
4	Germânia	11	6	1	4	18	24	−6	13	Qualified
5	AA das Palmeiras	11	5	2	4	20	15	+5	12	Qualified
6	São Bento	11	5	2	4	20	22	−2	12	Qualified
7	Mackenzie-Portuguesa	11	3	4	4	16	17	−1	10	Qualified
8	Ypiranga	11	3	4	4	12	12	0	10	Qualified
9	Santos	11	2	3	6	12	21	−9	7	
10	Minas Gerais	11	0	4	7	16	31	−15	4	
11	Internacional	11	1	1	9	10	43	−33	3	
12	Paulistano	11	5	3	3	24	7	+17	13 (Note: Paulistano withdrew from the championship after the eighth round.)	Withdrew

Updated to match(es) played on August 12, 1923. Source: RSSSF.com
Rules for classification: 1) points; 2) goal difference; 3) wins; 4) head-to-head points.

=== Second round ===
Pos	Team	Pld	W	D	L	GF	GA	GD	Pts
1	Palestra Itália	7	5	1	1	17	5	+12	11
2	Sírio	7	5	0	2	19	9	+10	10
3	Corinthians	7	5	0	2	14	5	+9	10
4	Mackenzie-Portuguesa	7	3	2	2	9	8	+1	8
5	São Bento	7	3	1	3	15	11	+4	7
6	Ypiranga	7	2	2	3	10	12	−2	6
7	Germânia	7	1	1	5	10	18	−8	3
8	AA das Palmeiras	7	0	1	6	6	32	−26	1

Updated to match(es) played on October 28, 1923. Source: RSSSF.com
Rules for classification: 1) points; 2) goal difference; 3) wins; 4) head-to-head points.

=== Final standings ===
Pos	Team	Pld	W	D	L	GF	GA	GD	Pts	Qualification or relegation
1	Corinthians	18	15	1	2	53	14	+39	31	Champions
2	Palestra Itália	18	11	3	4	44	22	+22	25	
3	Sírio	18	10	3	5	35	21	+14	23	
4	São Bento	18	8	3	7	35	33	+2	19	
5	Mackenzie-Portuguesa	18	6	6	6	25	25	0	18	
6	Ypiranga	18	5	6	7	22	24	−2	16	
7	Germânia	18	7	2	9	28	42	−14	16	
8	AA das Palmeiras	18	5	3	10	26	47	−21	13	
9	Santos	11	2	3	6	12	21	−9	7	
10	Minas Gerais	11	0	4	7	16	31	−15	4	
11	Internacional	11	1	1	9	10	43	−33	3	
12	Paulistano	11	5	3	3	24	7	+17	13	Withdrew

Updated to match(es) played on October 28, 1923. Source: RSSSF.com
Rules for classification: 1) points; 2) goal difference; 3) wins; 4) head-to-head points.
