= 1909 Campeonato Paulista =

Campeonato Paulista
- Season: 1909
- Champions: AA das Palmeiras
- Matches played: 29
- Goals scored: 96 (3.31 per match)
- Top goalscorer: Bibi (Paulistano) – 9 goals
- Biggest home win: AA das Palmeiras 4-0 Internacional (September 26, 1909)
- Biggest away win: Germânia 0-6 Paulistano (August 22, 1909)
- Highest scoring: São Paulo A.C. 4-3 Germânia (July 14, 1909); Internacional 2-5 Paulistano (October 31, 1909)

The 1909 Campeonato Paulista, organized by the LPF (Liga Paulista de Football), was the 8th season of São Paulo's top association football league. AA das Palmeiras won the title for the 1st time. No teams were relegated. Paulistano's Bibi was the top scorer with 9 goals.

== System ==
The championship was disputed in a double-round robin system, with the team with the most points winning the title.

== Championship ==
With the return of AA das Palmeiras to the league, the bottom two teams of the previous year's championship had to face off in a playoff to determine who would remain in the league, won by São Paulo Athletic.

In the last match, Internacional, that needed to beat Americano to win the title, tied by 1-1 (which would force them into a three-way tiebreak with AA das Palmeiras and Paulistano), with two goals annulled, and at the match's end, the referee was threatened by the Internacional players. Two of Internacional's players were suspended, and after the club's officialdom tried to appeal, the club was expelled from the league for refusing to obey the decision.

=== Selective tournament ===
Team 1	Agg.	Team 2	1st leg	2nd leg
São Paulo Athletic	4–2	Internacional de Santos	2–2	2–0

=== Championship ===
Pos	Team	Pld	W	D	L	GF	GA	GD	Pts	Qualification or relegation
1	Paulistano	10	5	4	1	26	12	+14	14	Playoffs
2	AA das Palmeiras	10	6	2	2	18	8	+10	14	Playoffs
3	Americano	10	2	5	3	10	13	−3	9	
4	Germânia	10	2	1	7	11	22	−11	5	
5	São Paulo Athletic	10	1	2	7	11	25	−14	4	
6	Internacional	10	6	2	2	17	13	+4	14	Disqualified

Updated to match(es) played on November 21, 1909. Source: RSSSF.com
Rules for classification: 1) points; 2) goal difference; 3) wins; 4) head-to-head points.

=== Finals ===
5 December 1909

AA das Palmeiras	2 – 1	Paulistano

Velódromo Paulistano, São Paulo
