= 1928 in Brazilian football =

Football in Brazil
- Season: 1928

The following article presents a summary of the 1928 football (soccer) season in Brazil, which was the 27th season of competitive football in the country.

== Campeonato Paulista ==
In 1928 there were two different editions of the Campeonato Paulista. One was organized by the Associação Paulista de Esportes Atléticos (APEA) while the other one was organized by the Liga de Amadores de Futebol (LAF).

=== APEA's Campeonato Paulista ===
Final Standings

Position	Team	Points	Played	Won	Drawn	Lost	For	Against	Difference
1	Corinthians	21	12	10	1	1	41	12	29
2	Santos	19	12	9	1	2	42	12	30
3	Palestra Itália-SP	18	12	8	2	2	45	16	29
4	Guarani	11	12	5	1	6	28	24	4
5	Portuguesa	7	12	3	1	8	12	35	-23
6	Ypiranga-SP	5	12	2	1	9	15	47	-32
7	Sírio	3	12	1	1	10	7	44	-37
8	Comercial-RP	-	-	-	-	-	-	-	-

Comercial-RP matches were canceled, as the club abandoned the competition.

Corinthians declared as the APEA's Campeonato Paulista champions.

=== LAF's Campeonato Paulista ===
Final Standings

Position	Team	Points	Played	Won	Drawn	Lost	For	Against	Difference
1	SC Internacional de São Paulo	33	22	14	5	3	61	32	29
2	Paulistano	33	22	15	3	4	61	22	39
3	Hespanha	30	22	13	4	5	52	38	14
4	Ponte Preta	30	22	13	4	5	60	37	23
5	Atlético Santista	26	22	10	6	6	57	31	26
6	AA São Bento	23	22	9	5	8	41	40	1
7	Independência	18	22	8	2	12	50	58	-8
8	Antártica	18	22	6	6	10	40	54	-14
9	Paulista	17	22	7	3	12	29	43	-14
10	Germânia	13	22	5	3	14	48	66	-18
11	União Lapa	12	22	5	2	15	28	86	-58
12	AA Palmeiras	11	22	4	3	15	35	55	-20

SC Internacional de São Paulo declared as the LAF's Campeonato Paulista champions.

== State championship champions ==
State	Champion	State	Champion
Acre	-	Paraíba	Palmeiras-PB
Alagoas	CSA	Paraná	Britânia
Amapá	-	Pernambuco	Sport Recife
Amazonas	Cruzeiro do Sul	Piauí	-
Bahia	Ypiranga-BA	Rio de Janeiro	Ypiranga
Ceará	Fortaleza	Rio de Janeiro (DF)	America
Espírito Santo	América-ES	Rio Grande do Norte	ABC
Goiás	-	Rio Grande do Sul	Americano-RS
Maranhão	Vasco-MA	Rondônia	-
Mato Grosso	-	Santa Catarina	Avaí
Minas Gerais	Palestra Itália-MG	São Paulo	Corinthians (by APEA); SC Internacional de São Paulo (by LAF)
Pará	Paysandu	Sergipe	Sergipe

== Other competition champions ==
Competition	Champion
Campeonato Brasileiro de Seleções Estaduais	Rio de Janeiro (DF)

== Brazil national team ==
The following table lists all the games played by the Brazil national football team in official competitions and friendly matches during 1928.

Date	Opposition	Result	Score	Brazil scorers	Competition
June 24, 1928	(Scotland) Motherwell	W	5-0	Feitiço (4), De Maria	International Friendly (unofficial match)
