= Clássico das Colônias =

Brazilian football derby

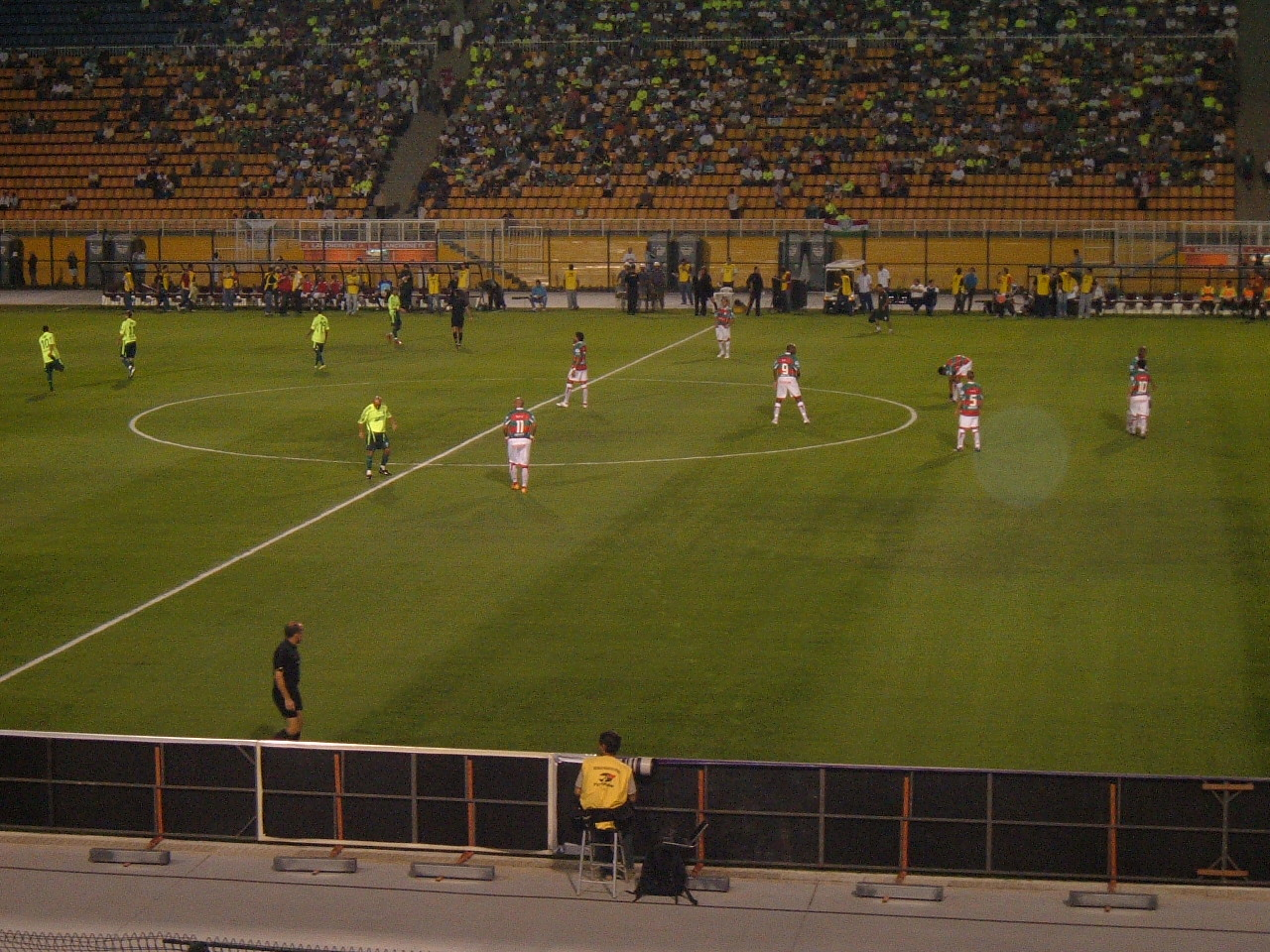
- Portuguesa v Palmeiras, Campeonato Brasileiro Série A, 24 May 2008

- Palmeiras Portuguesa
- Location: São Paulo
- First meeting: 13 May 1921; 1921 Campeonato Paulista; Palestra Itália 5–1 Portuguesa
- Latest meeting: 10 January 2026; 2026 Campeonato Paulista; Portuguesa 0–1 Palmeiras
- Stadiums: Allianz Parque (Palmeiras); Canindé (Portuguesa)

Statistics
- Total meetings: 268
- Most wins: Palmeiras (128)
- Top scorer: Heitor (15)
- All-time series: Palmeiras: 128; Drawn: 73; Portuguesa: 67
- Largest victory: Palestra Italia 7–2 Portuguesa (1927)
- Longest win streak: 9 games Palmeiras (1923–1928)
- Longest unbeaten streak: 19 games Palmeiras (1968–1973)
- Current unbeaten streak: 4 games Palmeiras (2014–present)

The Clássico das Colônias is the name of the derby between Palmeiras and Portuguesa. A rivalry from the city of São Paulo, first disputed in 1921, it represents the game between teams from two of the largest immigrant colonies in the capital of São Paulo.

Palmeiras was founded by Italian immigrants in 1914, under the name Palestra Itália, and Portuguesa, as the name suggests, by representatives of the Portuguese immigrant community, in 1920. Palmeiras play at the Allianz Parque, while Portuguesa play at the Estádio do Canindé, with the two grounds being separated by approximately 7 km. The teams have played 268 matches in all competitions, including friendlies; Palmeiras won 128 matches, while Portuguesa won 67, and the remaining 73 have been drawn.

== Matches ==
Palmeiras vs Portuguesa
Date	Home team	Score	Away team	Ground	Competition
13 May 1921	Palestra Itália	5–1	Portuguesa-Mackenzie (Note: Portuguesa played with a partnership with Mackenzie between 1920 and 1922)	Palestra Itália	Paulista Primeira Divisão
13 November 1921	Palestra Itália	3–1	Portuguesa-Mackenzie	Palestra Itália	Paulista Primeira Divisão
18 June 1922	Palestra Itália	2–1	Portuguesa-Mackenzie	Palestra Itália	Paulista Primeira Divisão
20 May 1923	Portuguesa	1–1	Palestra Itália	Jardim América	Paulista Primeira Divisão
14 October 1923	Palestra Itália	5–0	Portuguesa	Palestra Itália	Paulista Primeira Divisão
26 July 1925	Palestra Itália	3–1	Portuguesa	Palestra Itália	Friendly
20 September 1925	Palestra Itália	2–1	Portuguesa	Palestra Itália	Friendly
25 October 1925	Palestra Itália	3–0	Portuguesa	Palestra Itália	Paulista Primeira Divisão
1 August 1926	Palestra Itália	3–1	Portuguesa	Palestra Itália	Paulista Primeira Divisão
23 January 1927	Portuguesa	3–6	Palestra Itália	Palestra Itália	Paulista Primeira Divisão
18 September 1927	Palestra Itália	7–2	Portuguesa	Palestra Itália	Paulista Primeira Divisão (Note: Largest win of the derby's history)
10 June 1928	Palestra Itália	4–0	Portuguesa	Palestra Itália	Friendly
29 July 1928	Palestra Itália	6–2	Portuguesa	Palestra Itália	Paulista Primeira Divisão
7 September 1928	Palestra Itália	1–4	Portuguesa	Palestra Itália	Friendly
14 October 1928	Portuguesa	1–6	Palestra Itália	Rua Cesário Ramalho	Paulista Primeira Divisão
7 September 1929	Palestra Itália	0–1	Portuguesa	Palestra Itália	Torneio 7 de Setembro
6 October 1929	Portuguesa	2–2	Palestra Itália	Rua Cesário Ramalho	Paulista Primeira Divisão
10 November 1929	Portuguesa	1–2	Palestra Itália	Rua Cesário Ramalho	Friendly
11 May 1930	Portuguesa	1–2	Palestra Itália	Rua Cesário Ramalho	Friendly
7 September 1930	Palestra Itália	1–1	Portuguesa	Palestra Itália	Paulista Primeira Divisão
22 March 1931	Palestra Itália	1–0	Portuguesa	Chácara da Floresta	Torneio Início Paulista
5 April 1931	Palestra Itália	0–0	Portuguesa	Palestra Itália	Paulista Primeira Divisão
27 May 1931	Palestra Itália	3–1	Portuguesa	Chácara da Floresta	Friendly
24 October 1931	Palestra Itália	3–1	Portuguesa	Palestra Itália	Paulista Primeira Divisão
20 November 1932	Portuguesa	0–3	Palestra Itália	Rua Cesário Ramalho	Paulista Primeira Divisão
19 March 1933	Palestra Itália	6–1	Portuguesa	Chácara da Floresta	Friendly
25 June 1933	Portuguesa	3–1	Palestra Itália	Rua Cesário Ramalho	Paulista Primeira Divisão
7 September 1933	Palestra Itália	1–1	Portuguesa	Palestra Itália	Paulista Primeira Divisão
4 February 1934	Palestra Itália	0–1	Portuguesa	Palestra Itália	Friendly
13 May 1934	Palestra Itália	1–1	Portuguesa	Palestra Itália	Friendly
12 August 1934	Portuguesa	0–1	Palestra Itália	Rua Cesário Ramalho	Paulista Primeira Divisão
21 October 1934	Palestra Itália	2–2	Portuguesa	Parque São Jorge	Torneio dos Cinco Clubes
10 October 1937	Palestra Itália	1–2	Portuguesa	Palestra Itália	Friendly
23 October 1937	Palestra Itália	2–0	Portuguesa	Palestra Itália	Friendly
20 February 1938	Palestra Itália	0–1	Portuguesa	Palestra Itália	Friendly
23 July 1938	Palestra Itália	5–1	Portuguesa	Palestra Itália	Friendly
14 August 1938	Portuguesa	1–4	Palestra Itália	Rua Cesário Ramalho	Friendly
12 January 1939	Palestra Itália	0–0	Portuguesa	Palestra Itália	Friendly
19 March 1939	Palestra Itália	3–0	Portuguesa	Palestra Itália	Paulista Primeira Divisão
14 May 1939	Palestra Itália	0–0	Portuguesa	Palestra Itália	Torneio Início Paulista
16 July 1939	Portuguesa	2–3	Palestra Itália	Rua Cesário Ramalho	Paulista Primeira Divisão
29 October 1939	Palestra Itália	4–1	Portuguesa	Palestra Itália	Paulista Primeira Divisão
10 December 1939	Palestra Itália	0–2	Portuguesa	Palestra Itália	Friendly
14 April 1940	Palestra Itália	2–0	Portuguesa	Palestra Itália	Friendly
16 June 1940	Palestra Itália	3–0	Portuguesa	Palestra Itália	Torneio Rio-São Paulo
13 October 1940	Portuguesa	3–1	Palestra Itália	Pacaembu	Paulista Primeira Divisão
2 March 1941	Palestra Itália	0–0	Portuguesa	Pacaembu	Torneio Início Paulista
1 June 1941	Portuguesa	0–3	Palestra Itália	Pacaembu	Paulista Primeira Divisão
28 September 1941	Palestra Itália	2–2	Portuguesa	Pacaembu	Paulista Primeira Divisão
27 December 1941	Portuguesa	0–4	Palestra Itália	Pacaembu	Friendly
1 March 1942	Palestra Itália	2–1	Portuguesa	Pacaembu	Torneio Início Paulista
4 March 1942	Palestra Itália	2–4	Portuguesa	Palestra Itália	Friendly
12 April 1942	Portuguesa	1–1	Palestra São Paulo (Note: Club changed name from Palestra Itália to Palestra de São Paulo to remove any links related to countries from the Axis Powers)	Pacaembu	Paulista Primeira Divisão
8 September 1942	Palestra São Paulo	4–0	Portuguesa	Palestra Itália	Paulista Primeira Divisão
31 January 1943	Palmeiras (Note: Club changed name from Palestra de São Paulo to Sociedade Esportiva Palmeiras)	2–0	Portuguesa	Pacaembu	Friendly
14 March 1943	Portuguesa	1–0	Palmeiras	Pacaembu	Torneio Início Paulista
25 April 1943	Palmeiras	0–0	Portuguesa	Palestra Itália	Paulista Primeira Divisão
29 August 1943	Palmeiras	3–1	Portuguesa	Palestra Itália	Paulista Primeira Divisão
24 November 1943	Palmeiras	1–4	Portuguesa	Palestra Itália	Friendly
18 June 1944	Palmeiras	5–1	Portuguesa	Palestra Itália	Paulista Primeira Divisão
6 August 1944	Portuguesa	0–1	Palmeiras	Pacaembu	Paulista Primeira Divisão
8 April 1945	Portuguesa	0–0	Palmeiras	Pacaembu	Paulista Primeira Divisão
8 July 1945	Palmeiras	0–0	Portuguesa	Palestra Itália	Paulista Primeira Divisão
25 November 1945	Palmeiras	1–3	Portuguesa	Pacaembu	Friendly
21 April 1946	Portuguesa	4–1	Palmeiras	Pacaembu	Paulista Primeira Divisão
4 August 1946	Palmeiras	0–1	Portuguesa	Palestra Itália	Paulista Primeira Divisão
18 January 1947	Palmeiras	1–1	Portuguesa	Pacaembu	Friendly
23 April 1947	Palmeiras	1–1	Portuguesa	Pacaembu	Friendly
29 June 1947	Portuguesa	0–2	Palmeiras	Pacaembu	Paulista Primeira Divisão
2 November 1947	Palmeiras	2–1	Portuguesa	Pacaembu	Paulista Primeira Divisão
21 April 1948	Portuguesa	4–1	Palmeiras	Pacaembu	Taça Cidade de São Paulo
5 May 1948	Palmeiras	3–3	Portuguesa	Pacaembu	Taça Cidade de São Paulo
4 July 1948	Palmeiras	0–0	Portuguesa	Pacaembu	Paulista Primeira Divisão
15 November 1948	Portuguesa	5–2	Palmeiras	Pacaembu	Paulista Primeira Divisão
19 January 1949	Portuguesa	3–2	Palmeiras	Pacaembu	Taça Roberto Monteiro
5 May 1949	Palmeiras	3–2	Portuguesa	Pacaembu	Friendly
20 August 1949	Portuguesa	3–1	Palmeiras	Pacaembu	Paulista Primeira Divisão
1 September 1949	Palmeiras	3–1	Portuguesa	Pacaembu	Friendly
4 December 1949	Palmeiras	1–4	Portuguesa	Palestra Itália	Paulista Primeira Divisão
24 December 1949	Palmeiras	2–2	Portuguesa	Pacaembu	Torneio Rio-São Paulo
1 June 1950	Portuguesa	3–1	Palmeiras	Pacaembu	Torneio Prefeito Lineu Prestes
30 July 1950	Palmeiras	3–2	Portuguesa	Pacaembu	Taça Cidade de São Paulo
29 October 1950	Palmeiras	2–1	Portuguesa	Pacaembu	Paulista Primeira Divisão
10 December 1950	Portuguesa	3–1	Palmeiras	Pacaembu	Paulista Primeira Divisão
10 March 1951	Palmeiras	4–1	Portuguesa	Pacaembu	Torneio Rio-São Paulo
19 August 1951	Portuguesa	0–1	Palmeiras	Pacaembu	Paulista Primeira Divisão
9 December 1951	Palmeiras	1–0	Portuguesa	Pacaembu	Paulista Primeira Divisão
10 February 1952	Portuguesa	3–2	Palmeiras	Pacaembu	Torneio Rio-São Paulo
28 June 1952	Portuguesa	2–0	Palmeiras	Pacaembu	Torneio Quadrangular de São Paulo
21 August 1952	Portuguesa	5–3	Palmeiras	Pacaembu	Taça Cidade de São Paulo
19 October 1952	Portuguesa	2–2	Palmeiras	Pacaembu	Paulista Primeira Divisão
4 January 1953	Palmeiras	0–3	Portuguesa	Pacaembu	Paulista Primeira Divisão
26 April 1953	Palmeiras	4–3	Portuguesa	Pacaembu	Torneio Rio-São Paulo
20 September 1953	Palmeiras	2–1	Portuguesa	Pacaembu	Paulista Primeira Divisão
24 January 1954	Palmeiras	2–2	Portuguesa	Pacaembu	Paulista Primeira Divisão
22 May 1954	Palmeiras	2–0	Portuguesa	Pacaembu	Torneio Rio-São Paulo
24 October 1954	Palmeiras	5–1	Portuguesa	Pacaembu	Paulista Primeira Divisão
30 January 1955	Portuguesa	3–4	Palmeiras	Pacaembu	Paulista Primeira Divisão
27 April 1955	Portuguesa	5–2	Palmeiras	Pacaembu	Torneio Rio-São Paulo
29 May 1955	Portuguesa	2–2	Palmeiras	Pacaembu	Torneio Rio-São Paulo
5 June 1955	Portuguesa	2–0	Palmeiras	Pacaembu	Torneio Rio-São Paulo
18 September 1955	Portuguesa	3–2	Palmeiras	Pacaembu	Paulista Primeira Divisão
4 December 1955	Palmeiras	2–0	Portuguesa	Pacaembu	Paulista Primeira Divisão
28 April 1956	Palmeiras	2–0	Portuguesa	Pacaembu	Torneio Roberto Gomes Pedrosa (Note: Tournament was originally a Torneio Rio-São Paulo but changed name after clubs from Rio de Janeiro withdrew from the competition)
7 June 1956	Portuguesa	1–0	Palmeiras	Pacaembu	Torneio Início Paulista
19 August 1956	Portuguesa	2–1	Palmeiras	Pacaembu	Paulista Primeira Divisão
21 October 1956	Palmeiras	2–2	Portuguesa	Pacaembu	Paulista Primeira Divisão
30 December 1956	Palmeiras	2–1	Portuguesa	Pacaembu	Paulista Primeira Divisão
2 May 1957	Palmeiras	4–3	Portuguesa	Pacaembu	Torneio Rio-São Paulo
14 July 1957	Portuguesa	2–1	Palmeiras	Pacaembu	Paulista Primeira Divisão
19 October 1957	Palmeiras	1–1	Portuguesa	Pacaembu	Paulista Primeira Divisão
4 December 1957	Palmeiras	0–2	Portuguesa	Pacaembu	Paulista Primeira Divisão
19 March 1958	Palmeiras	3–0	Portuguesa	Pacaembu	Torneio Rio-São Paulo
21 September 1958	Portuguesa	2–1	Palmeiras	Pacaembu	Paulista Primeira Divisão
13 December 1958	Palmeiras	2–0	Portuguesa	Pacaembu	Paulista Primeira Divisão
29 April 1959	Portuguesa	6–3	Palmeiras	Pacaembu	Torneio Rio-São Paulo
5 July 1959	Portuguesa	0–0	Palmeiras	Pacaembu	Paulista Primeira Divisão
23 July 1959	Portuguesa	2–1	Palmeiras	Canindé	Friendly
3 December 1959	Palmeiras	1–1	Portuguesa	Pacaembu	Paulista Primeira Divisão
23 March 1960	Palmeiras	1–0	Portuguesa	Pacaembu	Torneio Rio-São Paulo
18 May 1960	Portuguesa	1–3	Palmeiras	Pacaembu	Troféu Roberto Ugolini
7 August 1960	Palmeiras	1–0	Portuguesa	Palestra Itália	Paulista Divisão Especial
6 October 1960	Portuguesa	4–1	Palmeiras	Canindé	Paulista Divisão Especial
30 March 1961	Palmeiras	2–1	Portuguesa	Pacaembu	Torneio Rio-São Paulo
30 August 1961	Portuguesa	1–1	Palmeiras	Pacaembu	Paulista Divisão Especial
3 December 1961	Palmeiras	3–1	Portuguesa	Pacaembu	Paulista Divisão Especial
25 February 1962	Palmeiras	2–1	Portuguesa	Pacaembu	Torneio Rio-São Paulo
9 September 1962	Palmeiras	1–1	Portuguesa	Pacaembu	Paulista Divisão Especial
28 November 1962	Portuguesa	2–2	Palmeiras	Pacaembu	Paulista Divisão Especial
6 March 1963	Palmeiras	2–1	Portuguesa	Pacaembu	Torneio Rio-São Paulo
3 September 1963	Portuguesa	3–0	Palmeiras	Pacaembu	Paulista Divisão Especial
13 October 1963	Palmeiras	5–1	Portuguesa	Pacaembu	Paulista Divisão Especial
21 March 1964	Palmeiras	3–1	Portuguesa	Pacaembu	Torneio Rio-São Paulo
2 August 1964	Portuguesa	1–0	Palmeiras	Morumbi	Paulista Divisão Especial
24 October 1964	Palmeiras	1–3	Portuguesa	Pacaembu	Paulista Divisão Especial
24 March 1965	Palmeiras	1–1	Portuguesa	Pacaembu	Torneio Rio-São Paulo
8 May 1965	Palmeiras	2–2	Portuguesa	Pacaembu	Torneio Rio-São Paulo
25 July 1965	Palmeiras	1–1	Portuguesa	Pacaembu	Paulista Divisão Especial
6 October 1965	Portuguesa	2–2	Palmeiras	Pacaembu	Paulista Divisão Especial
27 February 1966	Portuguesa	1–0	Palmeiras	Pacaembu	Torneio Rio-São Paulo
8 September 1966	Palmeiras	3–1	Portuguesa	Pacaembu	Paulista Divisão Especial
3 December 1966	Portuguesa	0–1	Palmeiras	Pacaembu	Paulista Divisão Especial
5 April 1967	Palmeiras	1–1	Portuguesa	Pacaembu	Torneio Roberto Gomes Pedrosa
19 August 1967	Palmeiras	2–1	Portuguesa	Pacaembu	Paulista Divisão Especial
10 November 1967	Portuguesa	2–2	Palmeiras	Pacaembu	Paulista Divisão Especial
10 April 1968	Palmeiras	2–3	Portuguesa	Pacaembu	Paulista Divisão Especial
22 May 1968	Portuguesa	2–0	Palmeiras	Pacaembu	Paulista Divisão Especial
21 November 1968	Palmeiras	1–0	Portuguesa	Palestra Itália	Torneio Roberto Gomes Pedrosa
12 January 1969	Palmeiras	1–0	Portuguesa	Palestra Itália	Torneio Início Paulista
1 March 1969	Palmeiras	2–0	Portuguesa	Palestra Itália	Paulista Divisão Especial
18 May 1969	Portuguesa	2–2	Palmeiras	Palestra Itália	Paulista Divisão Especial
25 November 1969	Palmeiras	2–0	Portuguesa	Palestra Itália	Torneio Roberto Gomes Pedrosa
25 March 1970	Palmeiras	1–1	Portuguesa	Palestra Itália	Taça Cidade de São Paulo
15 April 1970	Palmeiras	3–0	Portuguesa	Palestra Itália	Taça Cidade de São Paulo
28 June 1970	Palmeiras	0–0	Portuguesa	Palestra Itália	Paulista Divisão Especial
12 September 1970	Palmeiras	1–1	Portuguesa	Palestra Itália	Paulista Divisão Especial
18 April 1971	Palmeiras	2–1	Portuguesa	Pacaembu	Paulista Divisão Especial
23 May 1971	Portuguesa	3–3	Palmeiras	Pacaembu	Paulista Divisão Especial
15 July 1971	Palmeiras	2–0	Portuguesa	Palestra Itália	Friendly
8 August 1971	Palmeiras	1–0	Portuguesa	Pacaembu	Brasileiro Série A
29 February 1972	Palmeiras	3–1	Portuguesa	Pacaembu	Torneio Laudo Natel
7 May 1972	Palmeiras	1–1	Portuguesa	Pacaembu	Paulista Divisão Especial
19 July 1972	Portuguesa	0–3	Palmeiras	Pacaembu	Paulista Divisão Especial
15 October 1972	Palmeiras	1–0	Portuguesa	Palestra Itália	Brasileiro Série A
22 April 1973	Palmeiras	2–0	Portuguesa	Morumbi	Paulista Divisão Especial
7 June 1973	Palmeiras	0–0	Portuguesa	Palestra Itália	Taça Cidade de São Paulo
1 July 1973	Portuguesa	3–0	Palmeiras	Pacaembu	Taça Cidade de São Paulo
18 July 1973	Portuguesa	2–0	Palmeiras	Pacaembu	Paulista Divisão Especial
16 September 1973	Palmeiras	1–1	Portuguesa	Pacaembu	Brasileiro Série A
11 November 1973	Palmeiras	2–0	Portuguesa	Pacaembu	Brasileiro Série A
25 May 1974	Palmeiras	2–2	Portuguesa	Palestra Itália	Brasileiro Série A
22 September 1974	Palmeiras	1–1	Portuguesa	Pacaembu	Paulista Divisão Especial
20 October 1974	Portuguesa	1–1	Palmeiras	Pacaembu	Paulista Divisão Especial
20 February 1975	Portuguesa	0–1	Palmeiras	Pacaembu	Torneio Laudo Natel
27 April 1975	Palmeiras	1–0	Portuguesa	Pacaembu	Paulista Divisão Especial
31 July 1975	Portuguesa	3–0	Palmeiras	Morumbi	Paulista Divisão Especial
24 January 1976	Palmeiras	3–3	Portuguesa	Palestra Itália	Taça Governador do Estado de São Paulo
13 June 1976	Palmeiras	1–0	Portuguesa	Palestra Itália	Paulista Divisão Especial
1 August 1976	Portuguesa	0–0	Palmeiras	Pacaembu	Paulista Divisão Especial
3 November 1976	Palmeiras	2–1	Portuguesa	Pacaembu	Brasileiro Série A
24 April 1977	Palmeiras	3–2	Portuguesa	Pacaembu	Paulista Divisão Especial
26 June 1977	Palmeiras	0–0	Portuguesa	Pacaembu	Paulista Divisão Especial
27 August 1977	Palmeiras	2–1	Portuguesa	Morumbi	Paulista Divisão Especial
10 September 1977	Portuguesa	2–1	Palmeiras	Pacaembu	Paulista Divisão Especial
14 December 1977	Palmeiras	2–1	Portuguesa	Pacaembu	Brasileiro Série A
29 October 1978	Palmeiras	5–3	Portuguesa	Pacaembu	Paulista Divisão Especial
17 December 1978	Portuguesa	2–1	Palmeiras	Pacaembu	Paulista Divisão Especial
13 May 1979	Palmeiras	4–1	Portuguesa	Pacaembu	Paulista Divisão Especial
22 August 1979	Portuguesa	1–1	Palmeiras	Pacaembu	Paulista Divisão Especial
17 October 1979	Palmeiras	1–1	Portuguesa	Pacaembu	Paulista Divisão Especial
21 November 1979	Palmeiras	5–1	Portuguesa	Pacaembu	Paulista Divisão Especial
28 June 1980	Palmeiras	1–0	Portuguesa	Pacaembu	Paulista Primeira Divisão
21 September 1980	Portuguesa	0–3	Palmeiras	Pacaembu	Paulista Primeira Divisão
30 May 1981	Portuguesa	1–1	Palmeiras	Pacaembu	Paulista Primeira Divisão
9 September 1981	Palmeiras	0–0	Portuguesa	Pacaembu	Paulista Primeira Divisão
1 May 1982	Portuguesa	2–2	Palmeiras	Canindé	Torneio dos Campeões
26 May 1982	Palmeiras	0–0	Portuguesa	Palestra Itália	Torneio dos Campeões
15 August 1982	Portuguesa	2–1	Palmeiras	Canindé	Paulista Primeira Divisão
28 November 1982	Palmeiras	2–1	Portuguesa	Palestra Itália	Paulista Primeira Divisão
12 June 1983	Palmeiras	1–1	Portuguesa	Palestra Itália	Paulista Primeira Divisão
6 November 1983	Portuguesa	1–0	Palmeiras	Canindé	Paulista Primeira Divisão
12 November 1983	Portuguesa	0–3	Palmeiras	Canindé	Paulista Primeira Divisão
30 November 1983	Palmeiras	1–1	Portuguesa	Palestra Itália	Paulista Primeira Divisão
9 June 1984	Palmeiras	0–0	Portuguesa	Pacaembu	Friendly
15 July 1984	Palmeiras	3–0	Portuguesa	Pacaembu	Paulista Primeira Divisão
7 October 1984	Portuguesa	0–1	Palmeiras	Pacaembu	Paulista Primeira Divisão
10 February 1985	Palmeiras	2–1	Portuguesa	Pacaembu	Brasileiro Série A
24 March 1985	Portuguesa	0–0	Palmeiras	Canindé	Brasileiro Série A
20 July 1985	Palmeiras	1–1	Portuguesa	Pacaembu	Paulista Primeira Divisão
8 September 1985	Portuguesa	1–0	Palmeiras	Pacaembu	Paulista Primeira Divisão
2 February 1986	Palmeiras	2–1	Portuguesa	Pacaembu	Friendly
23 March 1986	Palmeiras	1–1	Portuguesa	Pacaembu	Paulista Primeira Divisão
17 August 1986	Palmeiras	3–1	Portuguesa	Pacaembu	Paulista Primeira Divisão
28 September 1986	Portuguesa	0–0	Palmeiras	Pacaembu	Brasileiro Série A
26 April 1987	Portuguesa	0–2	Palmeiras	Pacaembu	Paulista Primeira Divisão
31 May 1987	Palmeiras	1–4	Portuguesa	Pacaembu	Paulista Primeira Divisão
1 May 1988	Palmeiras	3–2	Portuguesa	Palestra Itália	Paulista Primeira Divisão
27 November 1988	Portuguesa	1–0	Palmeiras	Canindé	Brasileiro Série A
28 May 1989	Palmeiras	2–1	Portuguesa	Morumbi	Paulista Primeira Divisão
24 September 1989	Portuguesa	1–0	Palmeiras	Canindé	Brasileiro Série A
6 May 1990	Portuguesa	1–1	Palmeiras	Pacaembu	Paulista Primeira Divisão
22 July 1990	Palmeiras	1–0	Portuguesa	Pacaembu	Paulista Primeira Divisão
5 August 1990	Portuguesa	0–2	Palmeiras	Pacaembu	Paulista Primeira Divisão
22 September 1990	Palmeiras	1–3	Portuguesa	Pacaembu	Brasileiro Série A
17 February 1991	Palmeiras	0–2	Portuguesa	Pacaembu	Brasileiro Série A
8 September 1991	Palmeiras	0–1	Portuguesa	Pacaembu	Paulista Primeira Divisão
3 November 1991	Portuguesa	1–0	Palmeiras	Pacaembu	Paulista Primeira Divisão
12 April 1992	Portuguesa	0–2	Palmeiras	Canindé	Brasileiro Série A
2 August 1992	Portuguesa	1–0	Palmeiras	Canindé	Paulista Primeira Divisão
27 September 1992	Palmeiras	1–0	Portuguesa	Palestra Itália	Paulista Primeira Divisão
28 February 1993	Portuguesa	0–4	Palmeiras	Pacaembu	Paulista Primeira Divisão
11 April 1993	Palmeiras	2–1	Portuguesa	Pacaembu	Paulista Primeira Divisão
12 February 1994	Palmeiras	4–0	Portuguesa	Palestra Itália	Paulista Série A1
10 April 1994	Portuguesa	0–0	Palmeiras	Canindé	Paulista Série A1
17 November 1994	Portuguesa	3–1	Palmeiras	Canindé	Brasileiro Série A
29 January 1995	Portuguesa	2–1	Palmeiras	Canindé	Paulista Série A1
15 April 1995	Palmeiras	3–0	Portuguesa	Palestra Itália	Paulista Série A1
3 December 1995	Palmeiras	1–2	Portuguesa	Palestra Itália	Brasileiro Série A
25 February 1996	Palmeiras	3–1	Portuguesa	Palestra Itália	Paulista Série A1
1 May 1996	Portuguesa	1–2	Palmeiras	Canindé	Paulista Série A1
6 November 1996	Portuguesa	1–0	Palmeiras	Morumbi	Brasileiro Série A
16 February 1997	Palmeiras	4–1	Portuguesa	Palestra Itália	Paulista Série A1
12 October 1997	Palmeiras	0–0	Portuguesa	Palestra Itália	Brasileiro Série A
7 October 1998	Portuguesa	2–3	Palmeiras	Canindé	Brasileiro Série A
2 May 1999	Portuguesa	1–0	Palmeiras	Canindé	Paulista Série A1
30 May 1999	Palmeiras	4–3	Portuguesa	Palestra Itália	Paulista Série A1
29 September 1999	Palmeiras	3–2	Portuguesa	Palestra Itália	Brasileiro Série A
5 November 2000	Portuguesa	1–1	Palmeiras	Canindé	Copa João Havelange Group Blue
28 January 2001	Portuguesa	4–2	Palmeiras	Canindé	Paulista Série A1
13 October 2001	Portuguesa	2–0	Palmeiras	Canindé	Paulista Série A1
17 March 2002	Palmeiras	3–3	Portuguesa	Teixeirão	Torneio Rio-São Paulo
5 October 2002	Palmeiras	2–1	Portuguesa	Palestra Itália	Brasileiro Série A
9 August 2003	Palmeiras	4–3	Portuguesa	Palestra Itália	Brasileiro Série B
13 March 2005	Palmeiras	1–2	Portuguesa	Palestra Itália	Paulista Série A1
11 March 2006	Portuguesa	1–2	Palmeiras	Canindé	Paulista Série A1
26 March 2008	Palmeiras	1–0	Portuguesa	Palestra Itália	Paulista Série A1
25 May 2008	Portuguesa	1–1	Palmeiras	Pacaembu	Brasileiro Série A
24 August 2008	Palmeiras	4–2	Portuguesa	Pacaembu	Brasileiro Série A
21 February 2009	Portuguesa	2–2	Palmeiras	Canindé	Paulista Série A1
4 February 2010	Palmeiras	1–1	Portuguesa	Palestra Itália	Paulista Série A1
30 January 2011	Portuguesa	0–2	Palmeiras	Canindé	Paulista Série A1
25 January 2012	Palmeiras	1–1	Portuguesa	Pacaembu	Paulista Série A1
19 May 2012	Palmeiras	1–1	Portuguesa	Pacaembu	Brasileiro Série A
29 August 2012	Portuguesa	3–0	Palmeiras	Canindé	Brasileiro Série A
6 March 2014	Palmeiras	1–0	Portuguesa	Pacaembu	Paulista Série A1
28 February 2024	Portuguesa	0–2	Palmeiras	Canindé	Paulista Série A1
15 January 2025	Palmeiras	2–0	Portuguesa	Canindé	Paulista Série A1
10 January 2026	Portuguesa	0–1	Palmeiras	Canindé	Paulista Série A1

== Largest audiences ==
1. Portuguesa 1–2 Palmeiras, 53,363, 2 November 1947, Pacaembu
2. Portuguesa 3–0 Palmeiras, 50,717, 31 July 1975, Pacaembu
3. Portuguesa 0–3 Palmeiras, 48,321, 15 July 1984, Pacaembu

== Notable matches disputed ==
Portuguesa became champions over Palmeiras in the final of the 1955 Torneio Rio-São Paulo, by drawing the first match 2–2 and winning the second 2–0, in front of around 40,000 paying fans at the Pacaembu.

== Statistics ==
As of 9 February 2026

Competition	Played	Palmeiras	Draw	Portuguesa	Palmeiras goals	Portuguesa goals
Campeonato Brasileiro Série A (Note: Including the Torneio Roberto Gomes Pedrosa and the Copa João Havelange)	30	13	9	8	37	33
Campeonato Brasileiro Série B	1	1	0	0	4	3
Torneio Rio-São Paulo	21	11	5	5	47	38
Campeonato Paulista	158	77	45	36	284	185
Taça Cidade de São Paulo	8	2	3	3	14	18
Torneio Início Paulista	7	3	2	2	4	3
Torneio dos Campeões	2	0	2	0	2	2
Other tournaments	41	21	7	13	78	54
Total	268	128	73	67	470	336
