= 1911 in Brazilian football =

Football in Brazil
- Season: 1911

The following article presents a summary of the 1911 football (soccer) season in Brazil, which was the 10th season of competitive football in the country.

== Campeonato Paulista ==
Final Standings

Position	Team	Points	Played	Won	Drawn	Lost	For	Against	Difference
1	São Paulo Athletic	15	9	7	1	1	23	15	8
2	Americano-SP	11	8	5	1	2	29	15	14
3	Paulistano	7	9	3	1	5	17	15	2
4	Germânia	6	9	3	0	6	14	26	−12
5	Ypiranga-SP	5	9	2	1	6	13	28	−15

São Paulo Athletic declared as the Campeonato Paulista champions.

== State championship champions ==
State	Champion
Bahia	SC Bahia
Rio de Janeiro (DF)	Fluminense
São Paulo	São Paulo Athletic

== Interstate championship champions ==
In 1911, the first interstate competition was held, between the 1910 São Paulo and Rio de Janeiro state champions:

State	Champion
Taça Salutaris	AA das Palmeiras
