= 1926 in Brazilian football =

Football in Brazil
- Season: 1926

The following article presents a summary of the 1926 football (soccer) season in Brazil, which was the 25th season of competitive football in the country.

== Campeonato Paulista ==
In 1926 there were two different editions of the Campeonato Paulista. One was organized by the Associação Paulista de Esportes Atléticos (APEA) while the other one was organized by the Liga de Amadores de Futebol (LAF).

=== APEA's Campeonato Paulista ===
Final Standings

Position	Team	Points	Played	Won	Drawn	Lost	For	Against	Difference
1	Palestra Itália-SP	18	9	9	0	0	33	8	25
2	Auto	14	9	7	0	2	25	14	11
3	Corinthians	13	9	6	1	2	26	9	17
4	Santos	11	9	5	1	3	24	17	7
5	Sílex	8	9	3	2	4	17	26	−9
6	Sírio	7	9	3	1	5	21	20	1
7	Ypiranga-SP	7	9	3	1	5	16	22	−6
8	Portuguesa	7	9	2	3	4	17	26	−9
9	AA São Bento	4	9	2	0	7	9	31	−22
10	SC Internacional de São Paulo	1	9	0	1	8	9	24	−15

Palestra Itália-SP declared as the APEA's Campeonato Paulista champions.

=== LAF's Campeonato Paulista ===
Final Standings

Position	Team	Points	Played	Won	Drawn	Lost	For	Against	Difference
1	Paulistano	24	14	11	2	1	55	14	41
2	Germânia	18	14	8	2	4	38	28	10
3	Independência	17	14	7	3	4	37	30	7
4	Antártica	17	14	6	5	3	25	19	6
5	AA Palmeiras	15	14	6	3	5	28	24	4
6	Atlético Santista	11	14	5	1	8	30	32	−2
7	Paulista	8	14	2	4	8	24	46	−22
8	Britannia	2	14	0	2	12	20	64	−44

Paulistano declared as the LAF's Campeonato Paulista champions.

== State championship champions ==
State	Champion	State	Champion
Amazonas	not disputed	Pernambuco	Torre
Bahia	Botafogo-BA	Rio de Janeiro	Elite
Ceará	Fortaleza	Rio de Janeiro (DF)	São Cristóvão
Espírito Santo	Floriano	Rio Grande do Norte	América-RN
Maranhão	Luso Brasileiro	Rio Grande do Sul	Grêmio
Minas Gerais	Atlético Mineiro (by LMDT); Palestra Itália-MG (by AMET)	Santa Catarina	Avaí
Pará	Remo	São Paulo	Palestra Itália-SP (by APEA); Paulistano (by LAF)
Paraíba	Cabo Branco	Sergipe	not disputed
Paraná	Palestra Itália-PR		

== Other competition champions ==
Competition	Champion
Campeonato Brasileiro de Seleções Estaduais	São Paulo

== Brazil national team ==
The Brazil national football team did not play any matches in 1926.
