= 1907 Campeonato Paulista =

Campeonato Paulista
- Season: 1907
- Champions: Internacional
- Matches played: 29
- Goals scored: 93 (3.21 per match)
- Top goalscorer: Leônidas (Internacional) – 8 goals
- Biggest home win: São Paulo A.C. 4–0 Germânia (May 3, 1907); Americano 5-1 Paulistano (July 14, 1907)
- Biggest away win: Internacional de Santos 1-5 Germânia (August 4, 1907)
- Highest scoring: Americano 5-1 Paulistano (July 14, 1907); São Paulo A.C. 3-3Americano (July 21, 1907); Internacional de Santos 1-5 Germânia (August 4, 1907); Internacional de Santos 2-4 Americano (August 18, 1907); Germânia 3-3 Internacional (October 20, 1907)

The 1907 Campeonato Paulista, organized by the LPF (Liga Paulista de Football), was the 6th season of São Paulo's top association football league. Internacional won the title for the 1st time. No teams were relegated. Internacional's Leônidas was the top scorer with 8 goals.

== System ==
The championship operated in a double-round robin system, with the team with the most points winning the title.

== Championship ==
Pos	Team	Pld	W	D	L	GF	GA	GD	Pts	Qualification or relegation
1	Internacional	10	7	2	1	23	7	+16	16	Champions
2	Americano	10	4	3	3	20	17	+3	11	
3	Paulistano	10	5	1	4	14	15	−1	11	
4	Germânia	10	5	0	5	18	16	+2	10	
5	São Paulo Athletic	9	2	2	5	11	16	−5	6 (Note: São Paulo Athletic and Internacional de Santos didn't play their last match.)	
6	Internacional de Santos	9	1	2	6	7	22	−15	4	

Updated to match(es) played on November 15, 1907. Source: RSSSF.com
Rules for classification: 1) points; 2) goal difference; 3) wins; 4) head-to-head points.
