= Taça Competência =

- Organiser(s): APEA
- Founded: 1918
- Abolished: 1932
- Region: São Paulo, Brazil
- Teams: 2
- Most championships: Palestra Itália (4 titles)

The Taça Competência was a tournament organized by Associação Paulista de Esportes Atléticos (APEA), that aimed to carry out the confrontation between the Capital and the Countryside champions, since at the time, logistical impossibilities did not allow teams from the interior of the state to compete in the same championship as the capital clubs.

== List of Champions ==
The difference in levels was absolute, and never has a team from the countryside managed to win the Taça Competência. In 2021, the Federação Paulista de Futebol considered the countryside division of APEA to be equivalent to the second tier of football in São Paulo.

Year	Champion	Final Score	Runners-up
1918	Paulistano; 1918 Campeonato Paulista winners	5–0	Taubaté (Taubaté); 1918 APEA Countryside winners
1919	Paulistano; 1919 Campeonato Paulista winners	5–4	Paulista (Jundiaí); 1919 APEA Countryside winners
1920	Palestra Itália; 1920 Campeonato Paulista winners	W/O	Corinthians (Jundiaí); 1920 APEA Countryside winners
1921	Paulistano; 1921 Campeonato Paulista winners	6–3	Paulista (Jundiaí); 1921 APEA Countryside winners
1922	Corinthians; 1922 Campeonato Paulista winners	5–0	Rio Branco (Americana); 1922 APEA Countryside winners
1923	Corinthians; 1923 Campeonato Paulista winners	2–1	Rio Branco (Americana); 1923 APEA Countryside winners
1924	Corinthians; 1924 Campeonato Paulista winners	Not held due São Paulo Revolt of 1924	
1925	AA São Bento; 1925 Campeonato Paulista winners	2–0	Velo Clube (Rio Claro); 1925 APEA Countryside winners
1926	Palestra Itália; 1926 Campeonato Paulista (APEA) winners	10–0	Elvira (Jacareí); 1926 APEA Countryside winners
1927	Palestra Itália; 1927 Campeonato Paulista (APEA) winners	5–0	Botafogo (Ribeirão Preto); 1927 APEA Countryside winners
1928–1931	Not held		
1932	Palestra Itália; 1932 Campeonato Paulista winners	6–0; 2–2	Portuguesa Santista (Santos); 1932 APEA Santos Division winners

=== Titles by club ===
Titles	Club
4	Palestra Itália
3	Corinthians
3	Paulistano
1	AA São Bento

== See also ==
- Taça Campeonato Estadual FPF
