= 1909 in Brazilian football =

Football in Brazil
- Season: 1909

The following article presents a summary of the 1909 football (soccer) season in Brazil, which was the 8th season of competitive football in the country.

== Campeonato Paulista ==
Final Standings

Position	Team	Points	Played	Won	Drawn	Lost	For	Against	Difference
1	AA das Palmeiras	14	10	6	2	2	18	8	10
2	Paulistano	14	10	5	4	1	26	12	14
3	Americano-SP	9	10	2	5	3	10	13	−3
4	Germânia	5	10	2	1	7	11	22	−11
5	São Paulo Athletic	4	10	1	2	7	11	25	−14

Championship Playoff

December 5, 1909

AA das Palmeiras	2–1	Paulistano

AA das Palmeiras declared as the Campeonato Paulista champions.

== State championship champions ==
State	Champion
Bahia	Vitória
Rio de Janeiro (DF)	Fluminense
São Paulo	AA das Palmeiras
