= Archie McLean (footballer) =

Scottish footballer (1894–1971)

Personal information
- Date of birth: 1894
- Place of birth: Paisley, Scotland
- Date of death: 1971 (aged 76–77)

Senior career*
Years	Team	Apps	(Gls)
- Arthurlie
–1908	Glasgow Perthshire		
1908–1910	Ayr		
1910–1911	Galston		
1911–1912	Johnstone		
1912	Ypiranga		
1913	Americano		
1914	Scottish Wanderers		
1915–1920	São Bento		

International career
- São Paulo state
- * Club domestic league appearances and goals

Archie McLean (1894–1971) was a mechanic and footballer from Paisley, Scotland who emigrated in 1912 to São Paulo, Brazil.

In São Paulo, McLean's football career flourished and he became known, on the pitch, as Veadinho (the little deer). Charles William Miller is commonly regarded as having introduced the sport to the country.

== Early career ==
McLean was a machine mechanic working for J & P Coats, a textile company.

McLean had played for the Ayr F.C. team that amalgamated with Ayr Parkhouse F.C. to form Ayr United, as well as for Galston and Johnstone. With Johnstone he had won the Consolation Cup in 1912.

== Scottish Wanderers ==
McLean was transferred to São Paulo in 1912. Initially he had planned for only a three-month stay.

Shortly after taking up residence there, McLean founded an ex-pats' football team, the Scottish Wanderers. They played in the local São Paulo State League.

McLean's performances caught the attention of the Brazilian public within a year. He was picked for the São Paulo state team against Rio de Janeiro.

== Later career and death ==
McLean's involvement at the highest level of Brazilian football ended in the mid-1920s.

McLean died of throat cancer at 77 years of age.
