= 1926 Campeonato Paulista =

The 1926 Campeonato Paulista was the 25th season of São Paulo's top association football league. Two championships were disputed that season, each by a different league (APEA and LAF).

== LAF Championship ==
Campeonato Paulista (LAF)
- Season: 1926
- Champions: Paulistano (9th title)
- Top goalscorer: Filó (Paulistano) – 16 goals

In the edition organized by the LAF (Liga dos Amadores de Futebol), from June 6 to November 7. Paulistano won the title for the 9th time. No teams were relegated. The top scorer was Filó with 16 goals.

=== System ===
The championship was disputed in a double round-robin system, with the team with the most points winning the title.

=== Championship ===
Pos	Team	Pld	W	D	L	GF	GA	GD	Pts	Qualification or relegation
1	Paulistano	14	11	2	1	55	14	+41	24	Champions
2	Germânia	14	8	2	4	38	28	+10	18	
3	Independência	14	7	3	4	37	30	+7	17	
4	Antarctica	14	6	5	3	25	19	+6	17	
5	AA das Palmeiras	14	6	3	5	28	24	+4	15	
6	Atlético Santista	14	5	1	8	30	32	−2	11	
7	Paulista	14	2	4	8	24	46	−22	8	
8	Britannia	14	0	2	12	20	64	−44	2	

Updated to match(es) played on June 3, 2022. Source: RSSSF.com
Rules for classification: 1) points; 2) goal difference; 3) wins; 4) head-to-head points.

== APEA Championship ==
Campeonato Paulista (APEA)
- Season: 1926
- Champions: Palestra Itália (2nd title)
- Top goalscorer: Araken (Santos) – 13 goals

In the edition organized by the APEA (Associação Paulista de Esportes Atléticos) from April 25 to October 17. Palestra Itália won the title for the 2nd time. no teams were relegated and the top scorer was Araken with 13 goals.

=== System ===
The championship was disputed in a single round-robin system, with the team with the most points winning the title.

=== Championship ===
Pos	Team	Pld	W	D	L	GF	GA	GD	Pts	Qualification or relegation
1	Palestra Itália	9	9	0	0	33	8	+25	18	Champions
2	Auto	9	7	0	2	25	14	+11	14	
3	Corinthians	9	6	1	2	26	9	+17	13	
4	Santos	9	5	1	3	24	17	+7	11	
5	Siléx	9	3	2	4	17	26	−9	8	
6	Sírio	9	3	1	5	21	20	+1	7	
7	Ypiranga	9	3	1	5	16	22	−6	7	
8	Portuguesa	9	2	3	4	17	26	−9	7	
9	AA São Bento	9	2	0	7	9	31	−22	4	
10	SC Internacional	9	0	1	8	9	24	−15	1	

Updated to match(es) played on June 3, 2022. Source: RSSSF.com
Rules for classification: 1) points; 2) goal difference; 3) wins; 4) head-to-head points.
