= 1910 in Brazilian football =

Football in Brazil
- Season: 1910

The following article presents a summary of the 1910 football (soccer) season in Brazil, which was the 9th season of competitive football in the country.

== Campeonato Paulista ==
Final Standings

Position	Team	Points	Played	Won	Drawn	Lost	For	Against	Difference
1	AA das Palmeiras	18	10	9	0	1	43	12	31
2	Americano-SP	16	10	8	0	2	25	18	7
3	São Paulo Athletic	11	10	5	1	4	24	26	−2
4	Paulistano	8	10	3	2	5	19	17	2
5	Ypiranga-SP	4	10	1	2	7	11	32	−21
6	Germânia	3	10	1	1	8	14	31	−17

AA das Palmeiras were declared as the Campeonato Paulista champions.

== State championship champions ==
State	Champion
Bahia	Santos Dumont
Rio de Janeiro (DF)	Botafogo
São Paulo	AA das Palmeiras
