= Copa dos Campeões Estaduais (1920–1937) =

Football tournament in Brazil

This entry presents the two main national and official competitions between state champions that preceded the Taça Brasil de Futebol, namely, the 1920-CBD Champions Tournament and the 1937-FBF Champions Tournament, which are two different competitions, only with the same intention, challenge between state champions.

The winners of the competitions were Paulistano (from São Paulo) in 1920, and Atlético Mineiro (from Belo Horizonte) in 1937. That last title was recognized by the CBF as a Campeonato Brasileiro title in 2023.

== 1920 Torneio dos Campeões ==
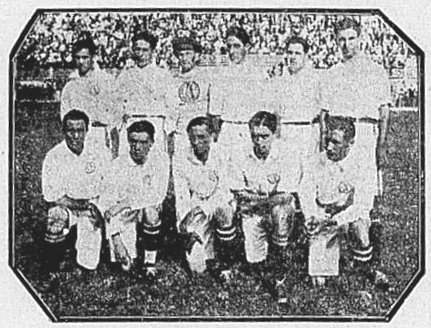
"The team of C. A. Paulistano, winner against Fluminense" Jornal do Brasil, 29 March 1920

The tournament of 1920 was held in March in Rio de Janeiro in the format of a league ("round robin"). All matches took place in the Estádio das Laranjeiras of Fluminense FC. It was the first competition organised by the Confederação Brasileira de Deportes, the precursor of today's CBF. Participants were the following winners of their state championships of 1919:

- the State Champions of Rio de Janeiro: Fluminense FC, from the city of Rio de Janeiro
- the State Champions of São Paulo: CA Paulistano from the city of São Paulo
- the State Champions of Rio Grande do Sul: Grêmio Esportivo Brasil from the city of Pelotas

Paulistano had to play without their star Rubens Salles who had to stay back in São Paulo due to undeferrable commitments. Grêmio Brasil featured Ismael Alvariza, who became in December 1920 the first player from a club outside Rio and São Paulo to play in the national team.

According to a report by Placar (1976), the competition was called "Brazilian Championship of Champions Clubs".

=== The matches ===
Paulistano 7 × 3 Brasil de Pelotas

25 March 1920

- Paulistano: Arnaldo - Orlando (c), Carlito - Clodoaldo, Mariano, Sergio - Zonzo, Mário Andrade, Friedenreich, Carlos Araújo, Cassiano. Coach: Angelo Bernardelli.
- Brasil: Frank - Nunes, Zabaleta - Flóriano, Rossell, Victório “Babá” (o Waldomiro) - Faria, Alberto Côrrea, Proença, Ignácio, Alvariza.
- Referee: Henrique Vignal (CR Flamengo, RJ).
- Goals: 4' Friedenreich, 11' M. Andrade, 17' Friedenreich, 25' M. Andrade, 29' Friedenreich, 42' Ignácio, 54' C. Araujo, 64' C. Araujo, 78' Proença, 82' Alberto.

Fluminense 1 × 4 Paulistano

28 March 1920

- Fluminense: Marcos Mendonça - Othelo, Chico Netto (c) - Laís, Osvaldo Gomes, Fortes - Mano, Zezé, Harry Welfare, Machado, Bacchi. Coach: Pode Pedersen.
- Paulistano: Arnaldo - Orlando (c), Carlito - Sergio, Carlos Araújo, Mariano - Zonzo, Mário Andrade, Friedenreich, Botelho, Cassiano. Coach: Angelo Bernardelli.
- Referee: Eduardo Gibson (São Cristóvão AC, RJ).
- Goals: 2' Zezé, 40' Friedenreich, 50' M. Andrade, 69' Botelho, 89' M. Andrade.

Fluminense 6 × 2 Brasil de Pelotas

3 April 1920

- Fluminense: Marcos Mendonça - Othelo, Chico Netto - Laís, Honório, Fortes - Mário, Zezé, Harry Welfare, Machado, Bacchi. Coach: Pode Pedersen.
- Brasil: Frank - Nunes, Zabaleta - Flóriano, Rossell, Victorino - Faria, Alberto Côrrea, Proença, Ignácio, Alvariza.
- Referee: Carlos Santos (SC Mangueira, RJ).
- Goals: Welfare e Zezé, no 1º tempo, e Zezé, Pelágio Proença, Zezé, Zezé e Machado.

Final table:

Pl.	Club	Matches	W - D - L	Goals	Points
1.	CA Paulistano	2	2 - 0 - 0	11-4	4-0
2.	Fluminense FC	2	1 - 0 - 1	7-6	2-2
3.	Grêmio Brasil	2	0 - 0 - 2	5-13	0-4

== 1937 Copa dos Campeões Estaduais ==
The 1937 tournament was organised by the Federação Brasileira de Futebol in January and held in a league format ("round robin") with home and away legs. Participants were the five state champions of 1936 and a delegation of the sports club of the navy, which qualified through an internal process. Participating teams were:

- the State Champions of Rio de Janeiro (Federal District): Fluminense FC from Rio de Janeiro
- the State Champions of São Paulo: Associação Portuguesa de Desportos from São Paulo
- the State Champions of Minas Gerais: Atlético Mineiro from Belo Horizonte
- the State Champions of Espirito Santo: Rio Branco AC from Vitória
- the State Champions of the municipality of Campos dos Goytacazes: SC Alliança from Campos dos Goytacazes
- and Liga de Sports da Marinha, the sports club of the navy, coached by the renowned Nicolas Ladany, based in Rio de Janeiro

Atlético Mineiro, Fluminense and Portuguesa were automatically qualified. The other participants played for one more place:

Qualification

6 January 1937	SC Aliança - Liga de Sports da Marinha	0-2
11 January 1937	Rio Branco AC - Liga de Sports da Marinha	2-0 aet

The Matches

10 January 1937	Portuguesa - Fluminense FC	4-1
13 January 1937	Fluminense FC - Atlético Mineiro	6-0
13 January 1937	Rio Branco AC - Portuguesa	3-1
17 January 1937	Fluminense FC - Rio Branco AC	5-2
20 January 1937	Rio Branco AC - Atlético Mineiro	1-1
24 January 1937	Atlético Mineiro - Portuguesa	5:0
24 January 1937	Rio Branco AC - Fluminense FC	4-3
27 January 1937	Fluminense FC - Portuguesa	6-2
31 January 1937	Portuguesa - Rio Branco AC	4-0
31 January 1937	Atlético Mineiro - Fluminense FC	4-1
3 February 1937	Atlético Mineiro - Rio Branco AC	5-1
14 February 1937	Portuguesa - Atlético Mineiro	2-3

Final table

Pl.	Club	Matches	W - D - L	Goals	Points
1.	Atlético Mineiro	6	4 - 1 - 1	18-10	9-3
2.	Fluminense FC	6	3 - 0 - 3	22-16	6-6
3.	Rio Branco AC	6	2 - 1 - 3	10-19	5-7
4.	Portuguesa de Desportos	6	2 - 0 - 4	13-18	4-8

Winner was Atlético Mineiro with the following team: Kafunga, Clóvis - Florindo, Quim - Zezé Procópio, Lola, Bala, Alcindo - Paulista, Abraz, Alfredo Bernardino, Bazzoni, Guará, Nicola, Resende, Elair - Coach: Floriano Peixoto. Atlético usually played in a 2-3-5 formation.

=== Recognition as a Brazilian championship title ===
On 25 August 2023, the CBF recognized Atlético Mineiro's title in the competition as a title of the Campeonato Brasileiro. The recognition was validated after the club's board presented a robust dossier to the CBF. The entity conducted in-depth studies that proved the legitimacy and national character of the competition organized by the CBD at the time.

== See also ==
- Taça dos Campeões Estaduais Rio – São Paulo
