= Taça dos Campeões Estaduais Rio – São Paulo =

Torneio dos Campeões Estaduais
- Organiser(s): LPF (SP) – FMSA (DF) (1913–1914); CBD (1926–1975); CBF (1975, 1980, 1987)
- Founded: 1912
- Abolished: 1987
- Region: Brazil
- Teams: 2
- Most championships: São Paulo (11 titles)

The Taça dos Campeões Estaduais Rio – São Paulo (Rio – São Paulo Interstate Champions Cup) or simply known Taça dos Campões Estaduais, was a tournament that promoted the clash between the champions of São Paulo state league and Rio de Janeiro state league.

In the majority editions of the competition, the trophy was held in direct specific matches (as well as a Supercup), in others cases, matches from another tournaments such as the Torneio Rio-São Paulo (1957) and Campeonato Brasileiro (1975, 1980, 1987) were used. Due precisely to the success of the Torneio-Rio São Paulo, for several editions there was no interest among the teams to compete. After the creation of the Campeonato Brasileiro in 70's, fewer dates were available in the season, and this also contributed to the dispute being abolished.

== List of Champions ==
Below is a list of all contested championships, which were in all 26 editions. In 1911 (Taça Salutaris) and in 1917, 1918, 1919 (Taça Ioduran), the concept of the dispute was the same, putting the champions of RJ and SP face to face.

Year	Champion	Final Score	Runners-up
1911	See Taça Salutaris		
1912	SC Americano; SP; 1912 Campeonato Paulista winners	3–0	Botafogo 1912 Campeonato Carioca winners
1913	Not finished		
1914	AA São Bento; SP; 1914 Campeonato Paulista winners	1–0	Flamengo 1914 Campeonato Carioca winners
1915–1916	Not held		
1917–1919	See Taça Ioduran		
1920–1925	Not held		
1926	Palestra Itália; SP; 1926 Campeonato Paulista (APEA) winners	3–0; 2–0	São Cristóvão 1926 Campeonato Carioca winners
1927	Not held		
1928	Not finished		
1929	Corinthians; SP; 1929 Campeonato Paulista (APEA) winners	4–2; 3–2	Vasco da Gama 1929 Campeonato Carioca winners
1930	Botafogo 1930 Campeonato Carioca winners	0–2; 7–1	Corinthians; SP; 1930 Campeonato Paulista winners
1931	São Paulo; SP; 1931 Campeonato Paulista winners	3–1	America 1931 Campeonato Carioca winners
1932–1933	Not held		
1934	Palestra Itália; SP; 1934 Campeonato Paulista (APEA) winners	1–1	Vasco da Gama 1934 Campeonato Carioca (LCF) winners
1935	America 1935 Campeonato Carioca (LCF) winners	2–3; 1–0; 3–1	Portuguesa; SP; 1935 Campeonato Paulista (APEA) winners
1936	Vasco da Gama 1936 Campeonato Carioca (FMD) winners	0–0; 3–1	Palestra Itália; SP; 1936 Campeonato Paulista (LPF) winners
1937–1940	Not held		
1941	Corinthians; SP; 1941 Campeonato Paulista winners	5–2	Fluminense 1941 Campeonato Carioca winners
1942	Palmeiras; SP; 1942 Campeonato Paulista winners	3–0	Flamengo 1942 Campeonato Carioca winners
1943	São Paulo; SP; 1943 Campeonato Paulista winners	3–0	Flamengo 1943 Campeonato Carioca winners
1944	No champions declared		
1945	São Paulo; SP; 1945 Campeonato Paulista winners	2–1	Vasco da Gama 1945 Campeonato Carioca winners
1946	São Paulo; SP; 1946 Campeonato Paulista winners	3–1	Fluminense 1946 Campeonato Carioca winners
1947	Palmeiras; SP; 1947 Campeonato Paulista winners	2–1; 1–3; 2–1	Vasco da Gama 1947 Campeonato Carioca winners
1948	São Paulo; SP; 1948 Campeonato Paulista winners	2–1	Botafogo 1948 Campeonato Carioca winners
1949–1952	Not held		
1953	São Paulo; SP; 1953 Campeonato Paulista winners	3–1; 1–0	Flamengo 1953 Campeonato Carioca winners
1954	Not held		
1955	Flamengo 1955 Campeonato Carioca winners	2–1	Santos; SP; 1955 Campeonato Paulista winners
1956	Santos; SP; 1956 Campeonato Paulista winners	4–2	Vasco da Gama 1956 Campeonato Carioca winners
1957	São Paulo; SP; 1957 Campeonato Paulista winners	5–2	Botafogo 1957 Campeonato Carioca winners
1958–1960	Not held		
1961	Botafogo 1961 Campeonato Carioca winners	3–0	Santos; SP; 1961 Campeonato Paulista winners
1962–1974	Not held		
1975	São Paulo; SP; 1975 Campeonato Paulista winners	1–0	Fluminense; RJ; 1975 Campeonato Carioca winners
1976–1979	Not held		
1980	São Paulo; SP; 1980 Campeonato Paulista winners	2–1	Fluminense; RJ; 1980 Campeonato Carioca winners
1981–1984	Not held		
1985	São Paulo; SP; 1985 Campeonato Paulista winners	2–2; 2–0	Fluminense; RJ; 1985 Campeonato Carioca winners
1986	Inter de Limeira; SP; 1986 Campeonato Paulista winners	3–0	Flamengo; RJ; 1986 Campeonato Carioca winners
1987	São Paulo; SP; 1987 Campeonato Paulista winners	2–1	Vasco da Gama; RJ; 1987 Campeonato Carioca winners

Notes

1. 1912 edition is also called by Taça Joaquim de Lamare.
2. Due to the World War II (and the fact of Brazil integrates the allied forces), during the year of 1942, Palestra Itália was changed the name to the currently SE Palmeiras.
3. The 1926 edition first match was also valid by the Taça Guaraná Espumante Zanotta.
4. In 1928 edition, America and Corinthians draw by 2–2 in the first match. The second game that was scheduled however was never played.
5. Palestra Itália was declared champion of the 1934 edition, but the criteria that determined the conquest are not known.
6. 1935 edition is also called by Taça Dr. Sérgio Meira, and was disputed on 1936.
7. In 1944 edition, Palmeiras and Flamengo draw by 3–3 and did not reach a consensus for the realization of a new match. Palmeiras otherwise counts this edition as a title in their official website.
8. 1945 edition is also called by Taça da Amizade, and was disputed on 10 April 1946.
9. 1947 edition is also called by Taça Mito, and was disputed on 1948.
10. 1955 edition is also called by Troféu Radio Nacional, and was disputed on 4 September 1956.
11. 1957 edition is also valid for a 1958 Torneio Rio-São Paulo match, disputed on 6 April 1958.
12. 1975 edition is also valid for a 1975 Campeonato Brasileiro Série A match, disputed on 8 October.
13. 1980 edition is also valid for a 1981 Campeonato Brasileiro Série A match, disputed on 21 February 1981.
14. 1987 edition is also valid for a 1987 Copa União match, disputed on 15 November.

== Titles by team ==
Club	Champions	Runners-up
São Paulo	11	0
Palmeiras	4	1
Botafogo	2	3
Corinthians	2	1
Vasco da Gama	1	6
Flamengo	1	5
Santos	1	2
America	1	1
AA São Bento	1	0
Inter de Limeira	1	0
SC Americano	1	0
Fluminense	0	5
Portuguesa	0	1
São Cristóvão	0	1

=== Champions by state ===
State	Champions
(São Paulo (state)) São Paulo	21
(Rio de Janeiro (state)) Rio de Janeiro	5

== See also ==
- Copa dos Campeões Estaduais (1920–1937)
