= Taça Salutaris =

1911 Taça Salutaris
Tournament details
- Country: Brazil
- Teams: 2

Final positions
- Champions: AA das Palmeiras
- Runners-up: Botafogo

Tournament statistics
- Matches played: 2
- Goals scored: 8 (4 per match)
- Top goal scorer(s): Eurico (AA das Palmeiras); 2 goals

The Taça Salutaris (English: Salutaris Cup), was the first interstate clubs competition realized in Brazil, between São Paulo champions and Rio de Janeiro champions. The name of the trophy was in honor of a bottler of mineral waters that financed the competition.

== Participants ==
Club	Criteria
AA das Palmeiras	1910 Campeonato Paulista winners
Botafogo	1910 Campeonato Carioca winners

== Matches ==
11 June 1911

Botafogo (Rio de Janeiro (state))	2–4	(São Paulo (state)) AA das Palmeiras
Rolando de Lamare; Mimi Sodré	Report	Eurico; Octávio Egydio; Godinho

Voluntários da Pátria, Rio de Janeiro
Referee: Víctor Etchegaray
9 September 1911

AA das Palmeiras (São Paulo (state))	2–0	(Rio de Janeiro (state)) Botafogo
Fritz; Irineu	Report

Parque Antártica, São Paulo
Referee: Raul Guimarães

== See also ==
- Taça dos Campeões Estaduais
- Taça Ioduran
