= 1921 Campeonato Paulista =

Football League

Campeonato Paulista
- Season: 1921
- Champions: Paulistano
- Matches: 132
- Goals: 553 (4.19 per match)
- Top goalscorer: Arthur Friedenreich (Paulistano) – 33 goals
- Biggest home win: Paulistano 12-1 Ypiranga (August 28, 1921)
- Biggest away win: Santos 0-7 Paulistano (September 4, 1921)
- Highest scoring: Corinthians 12-2 Internacional (October 23, 1921)

The 1921 Campeonato Paulista, organized by the APEA (Associação Paulista de Esportes Atléticos), was the 20th season of São Paulo's top association football league. The 2021 edition of the championship expanded, with the addition of Sírio and the return of Germânia. In addition to that, Mackenzie, in financial trouble and increasingly worse results on the latest championships, entered a merger with the recently founded Portuguesa. Paulistano won the title for the 8th time. The top scorer was Paulistano's Arthur Friedenreich with 33 goals.

== System ==
The championship was disputed in a double-round robin system, with the team with the most points winning the title.

== Championship ==
Pos	Team	Pld	W	D	L	GF	GA	GD	Pts	Qualification or relegation
1	Paulistano	22	19	1	2	98	14	+84	39	Champions
2	Palestra Itália	22	19	0	3	81	23	+58	38	
3	Corinthians	22	18	2	2	79	22	+57	38	
4	São Bento	22	11	3	8	42	41	+1	25	
5	Ypiranga	22	9	4	9	35	58	−23	22	
6	Minas Gerais	22	8	5	9	39	41	−2	21	
7	Sírio	22	9	2	11	40	55	−15	20	
8	Mackenzie-Portuguesa	22	7	3	12	25	48	−23	17	
9	AA das Palmeiras	22	5	4	13	33	40	−7	14	
10	Santos	22	5	3	14	26	61	−35	13	
11	Internacional	22	4	2	16	36	83	−47	10	
12	Germânia	22	2	3	17	19	67	−48	7	

Updated to match(es) played on December 25, 1921. Source: RSSSF.com
Rules for classification: 1) points; 2) goal difference; 3) wins; 4) head-to-head points.
