= 1907 in Brazilian football =

Football in Brazil
- Season: 1907

The following article presents a summary of the 1907 football (soccer) season in Brazil, which was the 6th season of competitive football in the country.

== Campeonato Paulista ==
Final Standings

Position	Team	Points	Played	Won	Drawn	Lost	For	Against	Difference
1	SC Internacional de São Paulo	16	10	7	2	1	23	7	16
2	Paulistano	11	10	5	1	4	14	15	−1
3	Americano-SP	11	10	4	3	3	20	17	3
4	Germânia	10	10	5	0	5	18	16	2
5	São Paulo Athletic	6	9	2	2	5	11	16	−5
6	Internacional de Santos	4	9	1	2	6	7	22	−15

SC Internacional de São Paulo declared as the Campeonato Paulista champions.

== State championship champions ==
State	Champion
Bahia	São Salvador
Rio de Janeiro (DF)	Fluminense; Botafogo^{(1)}
São Paulo	SC Internacional de São Paulo

^{(1)}In 1997, Fluminense and Botafogo were declared as the 1907 Rio de Janeiro State Championship champions.
