= Abelardo de Lamare =

Brazilian footballer (1892–1979)

Personal information
- Full name: Abelardo de Lamare
- Date of birth: 26 November 1892
- Place of birth: Belém, Brazil
- Date of death: 10 October 1979 (aged 86)
- Place of death: Rio de Janeiro, Brazil
- Position: Forward

Senior career*
| Years | Team | Apps | (Gls) |
| 1910–1911 | Botafogo | | |
| 1911–1913 | Fluminense | | |
| 1913–1914 | Botafogo | | |
| 1914 | Fluminense | | |
- * Club domestic league appearances and goals as of 2 February 2024

Abelardo de Lamare (26 November 1892 – 10 October 1979), was a Brazilian footballer who played as a forward. He represented the Brazil national team in 1914.

== Career ==
Champion and top scorer of the iconic 1910 Campeonato Carioca for Botafogo Football Club (incorporated by the current Botafogo FR), he was also known for being involved in a fight with Gabriel Carvalho from America, which caused a disturbance on the field at Rua Voluntários da Pátria, and led to the athlete's suspension for one year from the league (alongside Flávio Ramos). Botafogo in protest, withdrew from the 1911 Campeonato Carioca. He also defended Fluminense FC.

== International career ==
Lamare played in just one match for the Brazil national team, the first in history, against Exeter City, 21 July 1914.

== Personal life ==
Abelardo is brother of the also footballers Adhemaro de Lamare and Rolando de Lamare.

== Honours ==
Botafogo

- Campeonato Carioca: 1910

Individual

- 1910 Campeonato Carioca top scorer: 22 goals
