= Taça Ioduran =

- Organising body: APSA (SP) – LMDT (DF)
- Founded: 1917
- Folded: 1919
- Country: Brazil
- Number of clubs: 2
- Most championships: America, Fluminense and Paulistano (1 title)

The Taça Ioduran (English: Ioduran Cup), was the third interstate clubs competition realized in Brazil, after Taça Salutaris (1911), and Taça dos Campeões Estaduais (1913 and 1914). The tournament consists of the clash between São Paulo champions and Rio de Janeiro champions. In two of the three editions of the competition, the result was decided by W/O. This was because CA Paulistano refused to face America in 1917 and Fluminense in 1919.

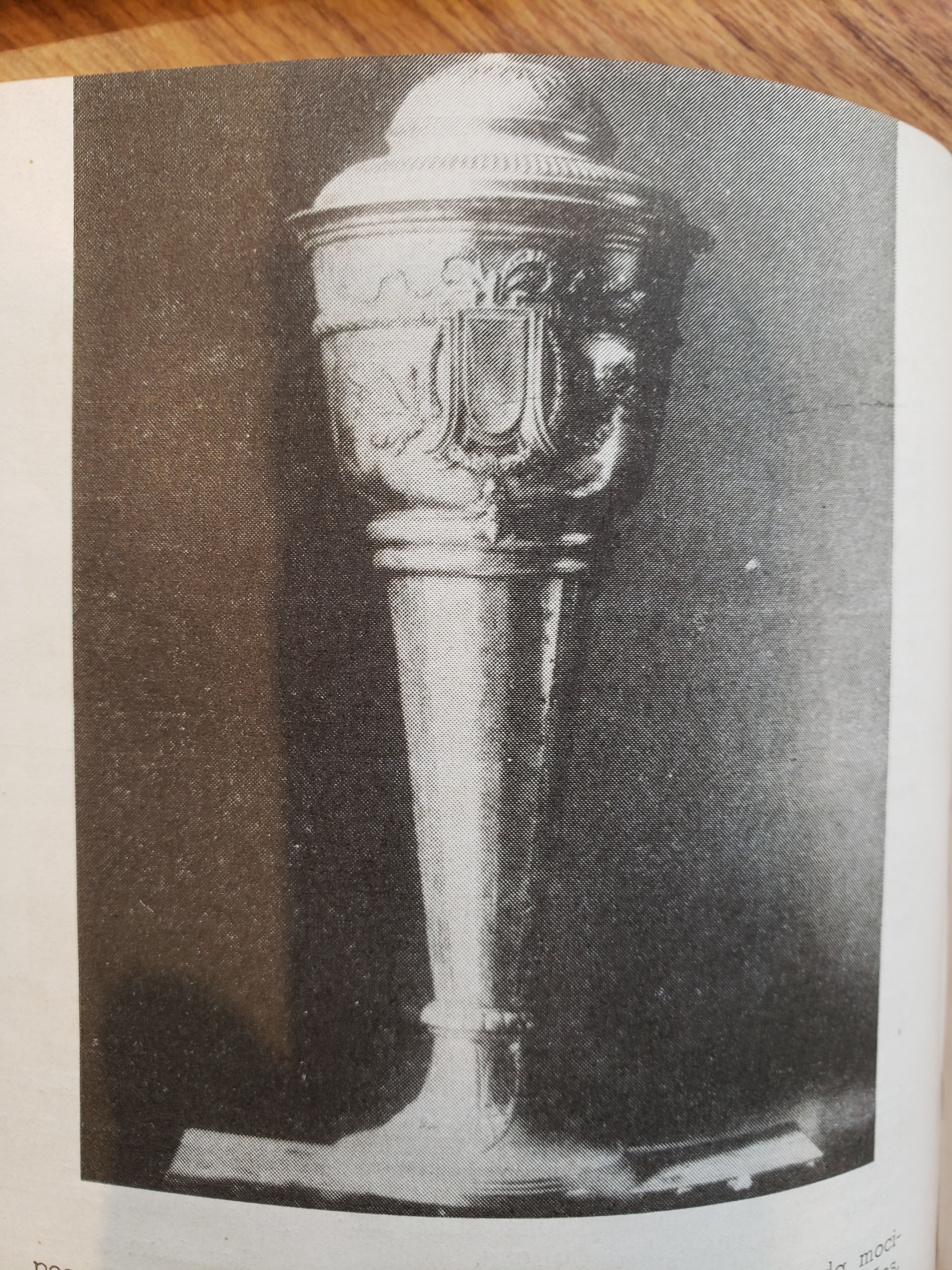
Taça Ioduran.

== List of Champions ==
Year	Champion	Final Score	Runners-up
1917	America; RJ; 1916 Campeonato Carioca winners	W/O	Paulistano; SP; 1916 Campeonato Paulista winners
1918	Paulistano; SP; 1917 Campeonato Paulista winners	3–2	Fluminense; RJ; 1917 Campeonato Carioca winners
1919	Fluminense; RJ; 1918 Campeonato Carioca winners	W/O	Paulistano; SP; 1918 Campeonato Paulista winners

=== 1918 Taça Ioduran ===
Below is the information about the only edition of the tournament that was actually decided on the field.

August 27, 1918

Fluminense (Rio de Janeiro (state))	2–3	(São Paulo (state)) Paulistano
Machado 11'; Zezé 39'	Report	Zonzo 50'; Mário Andrada 65', 86'

General Severiano, Rio de Janeiro
Attendance: 5.000
Referee: Antônio Augusto de Almeida

== See also ==
- Taça Salutaris
- Taça dos Campeões Estaduais
