= Clube Atlético Juventus =

Association football club in São Paulo, Brazil

Juventus da Mooca
- Full name: Juventus
- Nickname: Moleque Travesso (Prankster Boy)
- Founded: 20 April 1924; 102 years ago
- Ground: Rua Javari
- Capacity: 4,000
- President: Claudio Roberto Fiorito Filho
- Head coach: Thiago Carvalho
- League: Campeonato Paulista Série A2
- Website: www.juventus.com.br
Home colors	Away colors

Clube Atlético Juventus (Latin for Youth), commonly referred to as Juventus da Mooca or simply Juventus, is a Brazilian professional football club in the district of Mooca, São Paulo, that competes in Campeonato Paulista Série A2, the second tier of the São Paulo state football league.

Although it was a Campeonato Brasileiro Série B (Taça de Prata) winner once, Juventus nowadays competes only in tournaments in the state of São Paulo, such as the Campeonato Paulista.

The team typically plays in maroon shirts and white shorts, and is nicknamed Moleque Travesso (the Prankster Boy).

== History ==
Clube Atlético Juventus was founded on 20 April 1924 by Cotonificio Rodolfo Crespi employees, as Extra São Paulo. The team colors were the colors of São Paulo state, black, white and red.

The club changed its name to Cotonifício Rodolfo Crespi Futebol Clube in 1925, and in 1930, the club changed its name again, to Clube Atlético Juventus, because Count Rodolfo Crespi was a supporter of Juventus of Italy, but the team colors are a homage to Italian club Torino Football Club, because Rodolfo Crespi's son, Adriano, was a supporter of their Turin rivals.

Pelé states his most beautiful goal was scored at Rua Javari on a Campeonato Paulista match against Juventus on 2 August 1959. As there was no video footage of this match, Pelé asked that a computer animation be made of this specific goal. This animation can be seen on Pelé Eterno, a documentary about his career.

The club won the Copa FPF for the first time in 2007, after defeating Linense in the final, and also competed in that season's edition of Recopa Sul-Brasileira. Juventus was eliminated in the Campeonato Brasileiro Série C 2007's first stage.

On 23 September 2021, the São Paulo Football Federation recognizes the São Paulo titles of 1933 and 1934, to Albion and Juventus respectively.

== Players ==
=== First-team squad ===
As of 4 August 2026

Note: Flags indicate national team as defined under FIFA eligibility rules; some limited exceptions apply. Players may hold more than one non-FIFA nationality.

No.	Pos.	Nation	Player
1	GK	BRA	Gabriel Felix
2	DF	BRA	Daniel Guedes
3	DF	BRA	Vitor Graziani
4	DF	BRA	Fernando Fonseca
5	MF	BRA	Madison
6	DF	BRA	Eduardo Silva
7	FW	BRA	Paulinho
8	MF	BRA	John Egito
10	MF	BRA	Edinho
11	FW	BRA	Felipe Augusto
13	FW	ECU	Elkin Muñoz
14	MF	BRA	Rodriguinho
15	DF	BRA	Lucas Justen (on loan from Fluminense)

No.	Pos.	Nation	Player
16	DF	BRA	Matheus Leal
17	DF	BRA	Léo Coelho
19	FW	BRA	Romário
21	DF	BRA	Lucas Lopes
25	GK	BRA	Passarelli
30	FW	BRA	Maycon Douglas
31	MF	BRA	Keven
32	DF	BRA	Thomás Kayck
33	MF	BRA	Ferreira
35	MF	BRA	Freitas (on loan from Fluminense)
77	FW	BRA	Vinicius Spaniol
99	FW	BRA	Andrew

=== Academy ===
Note: Flags indicate national team as defined under FIFA eligibility rules; some limited exceptions apply. Players may hold more than one non-FIFA nationality.

No.	Pos.	Nation	Player
18	MF	BRA	Henrique Miranda
27	GK	BRA	Khendran
34	DF	BRA	Felipe Silva
-	FW	BRA	Roger Vidal

No.	Pos.	Nation	Player
-	MF	BRA	João Emanoel
-	GK	BRA	Salvador
-	DF	BRA	Felipe Bernardi
-	FW	BRA	Vitinho

== Honours ==
=== Official tournaments ===
National
Competitions	Titles	Seasons
Campeonato Brasileiro Série B	1	1983
State
Competitions	Titles	Seasons
Campeonato Paulista	1	1934
Copa Paulista	1	2007
Campeonato Paulista Série A2	3	1929, 2005, 2026

=== Others tournaments ===
==== State ====
- Taça Campeonato Estadual FPF (1): 1934
- Torneio Início (1): 1986

=== Runners-up ===
- Campeonato Brasileiro Série C (1): 1997
- Campeonato Paulista Série A2 (2): 1927, 1994

=== Youth team ===
- Copa São Paulo de Futebol Júnior (1): 1985
- Copa Votorantim Sub-15 (3): 1998, 1999, 2001

=== Women's Football ===
- Campeonato Paulista de Futebol Feminino (1): 1987

== Stadium ==
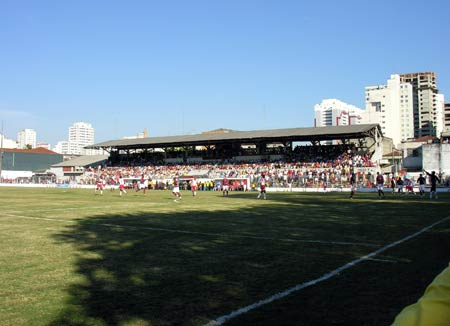
Juventus stadium

Juventus' home stadium is Estádio Rua Javari, inaugurated in 1929, with a maximum capacity of 4,000 people.

== Notable coaches ==
- (Brazil) Basílio
- (Brazil) Candinho
- (Brazil) Edu Marangon
- (Brazil) Márcio Bittencourt

== Symbols ==
The anthem's author is Carlos Alberto de Jesus Polastro.

The club is nicknamed Moleque Travesso, meaning the Mischievous Boy. The nickname was first used on 14 September 1930, by the journalist Thomaz Mazzoni, after Juventus beat Corinthians 2–1 at Estádio Parque São Jorge, which was Corinthian's home stadium at the time.

== Rivals ==
Juventus biggest rival is Nacional the games between the two clubs are called Juvenal. Because of the poor performances of both teams on their championships, they've been relegated to different divisions and cannot play a match between them, since 2007. However, in 2014 Nacional AC was promoted from Second Division to Division A3, where Juventus has been played for a couple of years leading to a recent edition of the Juvenal in April 2015. Portuguesa is another direct rival of Juventus. Their matches are known as The Immigrants' Derby (Italians vs Portuguese).
