= Torneio Início Paulista =

Torneio Início
- Organising body: Various
- Founded: 1919
- Abolished: 1996
- Region: São Paulo (state), Brazil
- Related competitions: Campeonato Paulista
- Most successful club(s): Corinthians (9 titles)

The Torneio Início Paulista (English: Campeonato Paulista Warm-up Tournament) was a traditional tournament that took place in Brazil marking the start date of the state championships.

== Format ==
The matches were held with 20 or 30 minutes, and many times, corners served as a tiebreaker.

These matches, as they do not follow the criteria established by FIFA, are not considered official, only the tournaments are endorsed by the respective organizing federations of the state championships (such as APEA and LFESP in São Paulo).

== List of champions ==
Following is the list with all the champions of the Torneio Início Paulista:

Season	Champions	Runners-up
1919	Corinthians (1)	Minas Gerais
1920	Corinthians (2)	Palestra Itália
1921	Corinthians (3)	Unknown
1922	AA das Palmeiras (1)	Corinthians
1923	AA das Palmeiras (2)	Santos
1924	Paulistano (1)	AA São Bento
1925	AA das Palmeiras (3)	AA São Bento
1926 (LAF)	Paulistano (2)	AA das Palmeiras
1926 (APEA)	Auto (1)	SC Internacional
1926 Extra (APEA)	Santos (1)	Siléx
1927 (APEA)	Palestra Itália (1)	República
1927 (LAF)	Paulistano (3)	AA das Palmeiras
1928 (APEA)	Santos (2)	Guarani
1928 (LAF)	SC Internacional (1)	Paulistano
1929 (APEA)	Corinthians (4)	Santos
1929 (LAF)	Portuguesa Santista (1)	Independência
1930	Palestra Itália (2)	São Paulo
1931	Atlético Santista (1)	Sírio
1932	São Paulo (1)	Palestra Itália
1933	Not held	
1934 (FPF)	Cama Patente (1)	Albion
1935 (APEA)	Portuguesa (1)	Estudantes
1935 (LPF)	Palestra Itália (3)	Corinthians
1936 (APEA)	Humberto I (1)	Portuguesa
1936 (LPF)	Corinthians (5)	Estudantes
1936 (FPFA)	Piratininga (1)	Sírio
1937	Santos (3)	Palestra Itália
1938	Corinthians (6)	Portuguesa Santista
1939	Palestra Itália (4)	São Paulo Railway
1940	São Paulo (2)	Corinthians
1941	Corinthians (7)	Portuguesa
1942	Palestra Itália (5)	Santos
1943	São Paulo Railway (1)	Portuguesa
1944	Corinthians (8)	Ypiranga
1945	São Paulo (3)	Ypiranga
1946	Palmeiras (6)	São Paulo
1947	Portuguesa (2)	São Paulo
1948	Ypiranga (1)	Portuguesa Santista
1949	XV de Piracicaba (1)	São Paulo
1950	Ypiranga (2)	XV de Piracicaba
1951	Not held	
1952	Santos (4)	Portuguesa
1953	Guarani (1)	Palmeiras
1954	Guarani (2)	São Paulo
1955	Corinthians (9)	Linense
1956	Guarani (3)	Noroeste
1957	Botafogo (1)	Guarani
1958	América (1)	Palmeiras
1959–1968	Not held	
1969	Palmeiras (7)	Guarani
1970–1983	Not held	
1984	Santos (5)	XV de Jaú
1985	Not held	
1986	Juventus (1)	Santo André
1987–1990	Not held	
1991	Bragantino (1)	Botafogo
1992–1995	Not held	
1996	Portuguesa (3)	Rio Branco

== Titles by team ==
Rank	Club	Winners	Winning years
1	Corinthians	9	1919, 1920, 1921, 1929 (APEA), 1936 (LPF), 1938, 1941, 1944, 1955
2	Palmeiras	7	1927 (APEA), 1930, 1935 (LPF), 1939, 1942, 1946, 1969
3	Santos	5	1926 Extra (APEA), 1928 (APEA), 1937, 1952, 1984
4	AA das Palmeiras	3	1922, 1923, 1925
4	Guarani	3	1953, 1954, 1956
4	Paulistano	3	1924, 1926 (LAF), 1927 (LAF)
4	Portuguesa	3	1935 (APEA), 1947, 1996
4	São Paulo	3	1932, 1940, 1945
9	Ypiranga	2	1948, 1950
10	América	1	1958
10	Atlético Santista	1	1931
10	Botafogo	1	1957
10	Bragantino	1	1991
10	Humberto I	1	1936 (APEA)
10	Juventus	1	1986
10	Minas Gerais	1	1926 (APEA)
10	Nacional	1	1943
10	Portuguesa Santista	1	1929 (LAF)
10	XV de Piracicaba	1	1949

== Women's tournament ==
In 1997, an edition of the Torneio Início was held for the women's 1997 Campeonato Paulista.

Season	Champions	Runners-up
1997	São Paulo	Portuguesa

== See also ==
- Torneio Início Carioca
