= Orlando (footballer, born 1895) =

Brazilian footballer

Personal information
- Full name: Orlando Pereira Pires
- Date of birth: 21 April 1895
- Place of birth: Campinas, Brazil
- Position: Defender

Senior career*
Years	Team	Apps	(Gls)
1912–1914	Mackenzie		
1915–1922	Paulistano		

International career
1916	Brazil	4	(0)
Medal record
Men's football
Representing Brazil
South American Championship
Third place	1916 Argentina
- * Club domestic league appearances and goals

Orlando Pereira Pires (born 21 April 1895, date of death unknown), known as just Orlando, was a Brazilian footballer who played as a defender. He played in four matches for the Brazil national football team in 1916. He was also part of Brazil's squad for the 1916 South American Championship.
