= Rolando de Lamare =

Brazilian footballer (1888–1963)

Personal information
- Full name: Rolando de Lamare
- Date of birth: 10 November 1888
- Place of birth: Belém, Brazil
- Date of death: 20 July 1963 (aged 74)
- Place of death: Rio de Janeiro, Brazil
- Position: Midfielder

Senior career*
| Years | Team | Apps | (Gls) |
| 1906–1914 | Botafogo | | |
- * Club domestic league appearances and goals

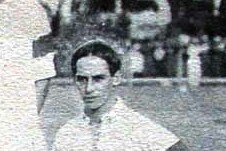
Rolando de Lamare in 1914

Rolando de Lamare (10 November 1888 – 20 July 1963) was a Brazilian footballer who played as a midfielder.

== Club career ==
Rolando played for Botafogo Football Club (incorporated by the current Botafogo FR) from the first edition of the Campeonato Carioca in 1906 until 1914, participating in the titles of 1907, 1910 and 1912.

== International career ==
Lamare played in just one match for the Brazil national team, the first in history, against Exeter City, 21 July 1914.

== Personal life ==
Rolando was the brother of fellow footballers Abelardo de Lamare and Adhemaro de Lamare. In 1912, he began studying medicine at UFRJ, abandoning his football career in 1914. Lamare specialized in urology.

== Honours ==
Botafogo

- Campeonato Carioca: 1907, 1910, 1912
