= 1910 Campeonato Carioca =

Season of the football championship in the state of Rio de Janeiro

Campeonato Carioca
- Season: 1910
- Champions: Botafogo
- Relegated: Haddock Lobo
- Matches: 30
- Goals: 156 (5.2 per match)
- Top goalscorer: Abelardo de Lamare (Botafogo) – 22 goals
- Biggest home win: América 10-1 Haddock Lobo (October 16, 1910)
- Biggest away win: Riachuelo 1-15 Botafogo (September 4, 1910)
- Highest scoring: Riachuelo 1-15 Botafogo (September 4, 1910)

The 1910 Campeonato Carioca, the fifth edition of that championship, kicked off on May 1, 1910, and ended on October 30, 1910. It was organized by LMSA (Liga Metropolitana de Sports Athleticos, or Metropolitan Athletic Sports League). Six teams participated. Botafogo won the title for the 2nd time. Haddock Lobo was relegated.

== Participating teams ==
Club	Home location	Previous season
América	Tijuca, Rio de Janeiro	3rd
Botafogo	Botafogo, Rio de Janeiro	2nd
Fluminense	Laranjeiras, Rio de Janeiro	1st
Haddock Lobo	Tijuca, Rio de Janeiro	5th
Riachuelo	Riachuelo, Rio de Janeiro	4th
Rio Cricket	Praia Grande, Niterói	–

== System ==
The tournament would be disputed in a double round-robin format, with the team with the most points winning the title. The team with the fewest points would be relegated.

== Championship ==
Pos	Team	Pld	W	D	L	GF	GA	GD	Pts	Qualification or relegation
1	Botafogo	10	9	0	1	66	9	+57	18	Champions
2	Fluminense	10	7	1	2	28	16	+12	15	
3	América	10	7	0	3	31	18	+13	14	
4	Riachuelo	10	3	0	7	16	37	−21	6	
5	Rio Cricket	10	2	1	7	4	26	−22	5	
6	Haddock Lobo	10	1	0	9	11	50	−39	2	Relegated

Updated to match(es) played on October 30, 1910. Source: RSSSF.com
Rules for classification: 1) points; 2) goal difference; 3) wins; 4) number of goals scored.
