= Scottish Wanderers Football Club =

Scottish Wanderers
- Full name: Scottish Wanderers Football Club
- Nicknames: Time dos ingleses Clube dos escoceses
- Founded: 1913
- Dissolved: 1916
- Ground: Velódromo, São Paulo, São Paulo state, Brazil
- Capacity: 10,000
Home colors	Away colors

Scottish Wanderers Football Club, commonly known as Scottish Wanderers, were a Brazilian football club from São Paulo. They competed in the Campeonato Paulista in 1914 and in 1915, and were one of the first professional clubs in the country.

== History ==
Scottish Wanderers Football Club were founded by former São Paulo Athletic Club players, after that club folded in 1912. The founders were members of the Scottish community in São Paulo, included among them Archie McLean. Scottish Wanderers debuted in the Campeonato Paulista organized by APEA on April 5, 1914, finishing in the fifth place in that season. They competed for the last time in 1915, when they finished again in the fifth place. The players who were members of Mackenzie College shared the club's income, which was understood by the Campeonato Paulista organizers as playing professionally. A player who was not allowed to play in the club denounced this fact to the APEA and thus the club were banned in 1916, as only amateur clubs were allowed to compete in the tournament at that time. The club folded a few days after being banned.

== Colors and badge ==
The club played in blue, and their badge was a white lion.

== Stadium ==
Scottish Wanderers played all their games at the Velódromo. The stadium had a maximum capacity of 10,000 people.
