= Taça Campeonato Estadual FPF =

1934 Taça Campeonato Estadual FPF
Tournament details
- Country: São Paulo Brazil
- Teams: 2

Final positions
- Champions: Fiorentino
- Runners-up: Ferroviária (Pindamonhangaba)

Tournament statistics
- Matches played: 2
- Goals scored: 9 (4.5 per match)

The Taça Campeonato Estadual FPF (English: FPF State Champions Cup), was a competition along the same lines as the APEA Taça Competência. Held by the Federação Paulista de Foot-Ball (FPF), an entity that organized two editions of the Campeonato Paulista (1933 and 1934), put the 1934 Campeonato Paulista champion and the Countryside Champion to face each other in two matches.

== Participants ==
Club	Criteria
Fiorentino	1934 Campeonato Paulista (FPF) winners
Ferroviária (Pindamonhangaba)	1934 FPF Countryside Division winners

== Matches ==
October 21, 1934

Ferroviária	0–5	Fiorentino
		Goal

Estádio Antônio Pinheiro Jr., Pindamonhangaba
October 28, 1934

Fiorentino	3–1	Ferroviária
Raul 18', 23'; Sabratti 32'		Guedes 80'

Rua Javari, São Paulo
Referee: Fausto Mollina Lang

=== Champion ===
1934 Taça Campeonato Estadual
(São Paulo (state))
Fiorentino
1st title

== See also ==
- Taça Competência
