= Ismael Alvariza =

Brazilian footballer (born 1897)

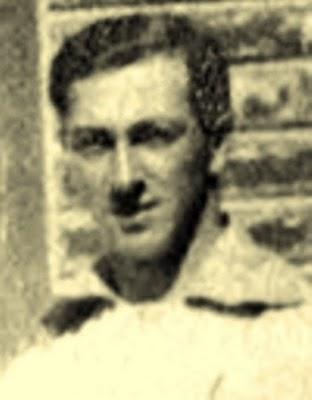

Personal information
- Date of birth: 16 April 1897
- Place of birth: Pelotas, Rio Grande do Sul, Brazil
- Position: Forward

International career
Years	Team	Apps	(Gls)
1920	Brazil	4	(1)

Ismael Alvariza (born 16 April 1897, date of death unknown) was a Brazilian footballer. He played in four matches for the Brazil national football team in 1920. He was also part of Brazil's squad for the 1920 South American Championship.
