= Estádio Jardim América =

Soccer stadium in São Paulo, Brazil

Estádio do Club Athletico Paulistano
- Jardim América
- Full name: Estádio Jardim América
- Location: São Paulo, Brazil
- Owner: Paulistano
- Capacity: 15,000
- Field size: 109 x 73 m

Construction
- Built: 1917
- Opened: October 29, 1917
- Demolished: 1950

Tenant
- Paulistano

Estádio do Club Athletico Paulistano, commonly known as Estádio Jardim América, was a football stadium located in São Paulo, Brazil. It was the home stadium of Paulistano and it had a maximum capacity of 15,000 people.

== History ==
The stadium was inaugurated on October 29, 1917, when a São Paulo State combined team defeated Dublin FC of Uruguay 1–0. The stadium was demolished in 1950.
