= Velódromo Paulistano =

Sports venue in São Paulo, Brazil

- Velódromo
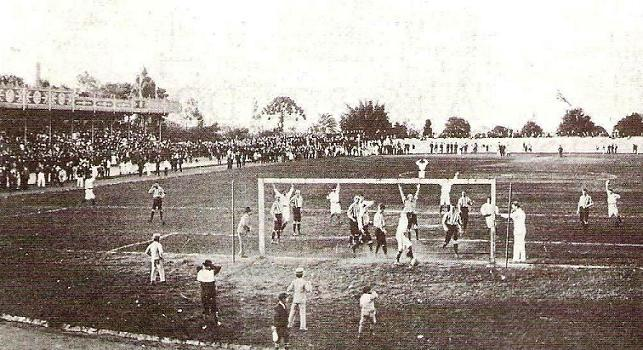
- Paulistano vs. SPAC 1905; Paulistano scores in the Vélodromo
- Full name: Velódromo Paulistano
- Location: São Paulo, Brazil
- Owner: Veloce Club Olimpic Paulista
- Operator: Paulistano
- Capacity: 10,000
- Field size: 100 x 64 m

Construction
- Built: 1892
- Opened: 1892 (track cycling); October 18, 1901 (football)
- Demolished: 1916

Tenants
- Americano; Paulistano; Scottish Wanderers

Velódromo Paulistano, commonly known as just Velódromo, was a cycling and football stadium located in São Paulo, Brazil. It was the home stadium of Americano, Paulistano and Scottish Wanderers. It was owned by Veloce Club Olimpic Paulista and it had a maximum capacity of 10,000 people. After being reformed as a football stadium, it was operated by Club Athletico Paulistano.

== History ==
The stadium was inaugurated in 1892, as a cycling stadium. It was opened as a football stadium on October 18, 1901, when a São Paulo State combined team and a Rio de Janeiro State drew 1–1. The first football game between clubs was played on May 8, 1902, when São Paulo Athletic beat Paulistano 4–0. Charles Miller scored that game's first goal. The last game played at the Velódromo was a game between a São Paulo State combined team and a Rio de Janeiro State combined team. São Paulo State won the game 8–0. Velódromo Paulistano was demolished in 1916.
