= America Football Club (Rio de Janeiro) =

Brazilian association football club

America
- Full name: America Football Club
- Nicknames: AFC; Mecão; Diabo (Devil); Rubro Carioca (Rio's Reds); Sangue (Blood)
- Founded: 18 September 1904; 121 years ago
- Ground: Estádio Giulite Coutinho
- Capacity: 13,544
- President: Romário
- Head coach: Leandrão
- League: Campeonato Brasileiro Série D Campeonato Carioca Série A2
- 2025: Carioca Série A2, 6th of 12
- Website: www.americario.com.br
Home colors	Away colors

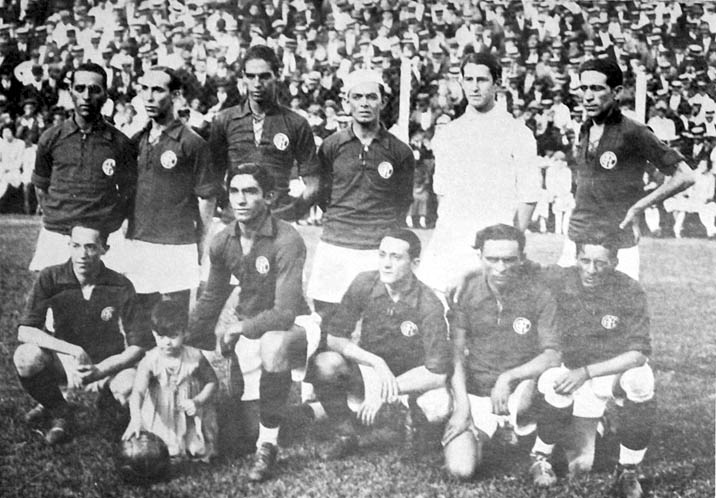
America F.C. team in 1929.

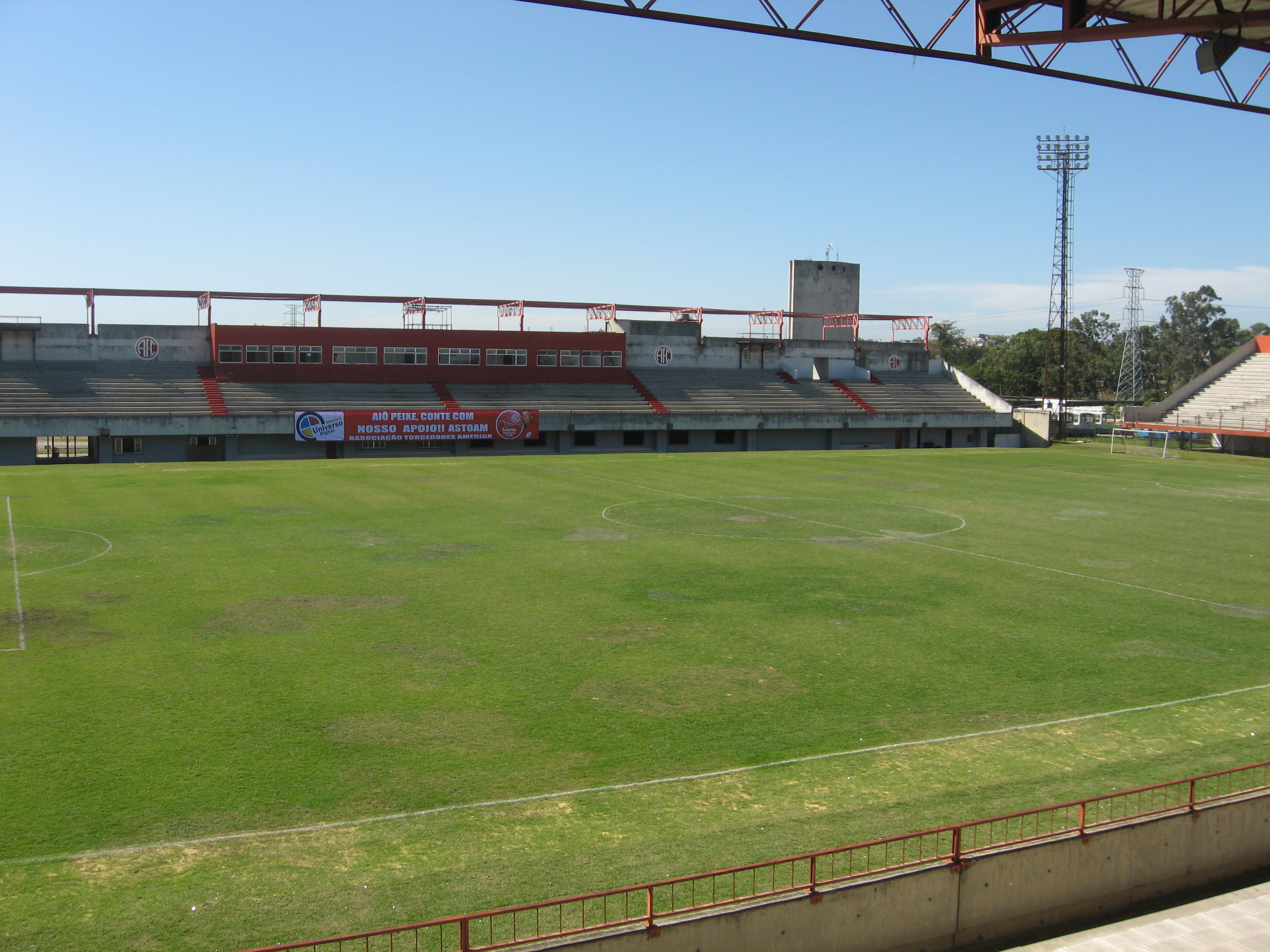
Estádio Giulite Coutinho

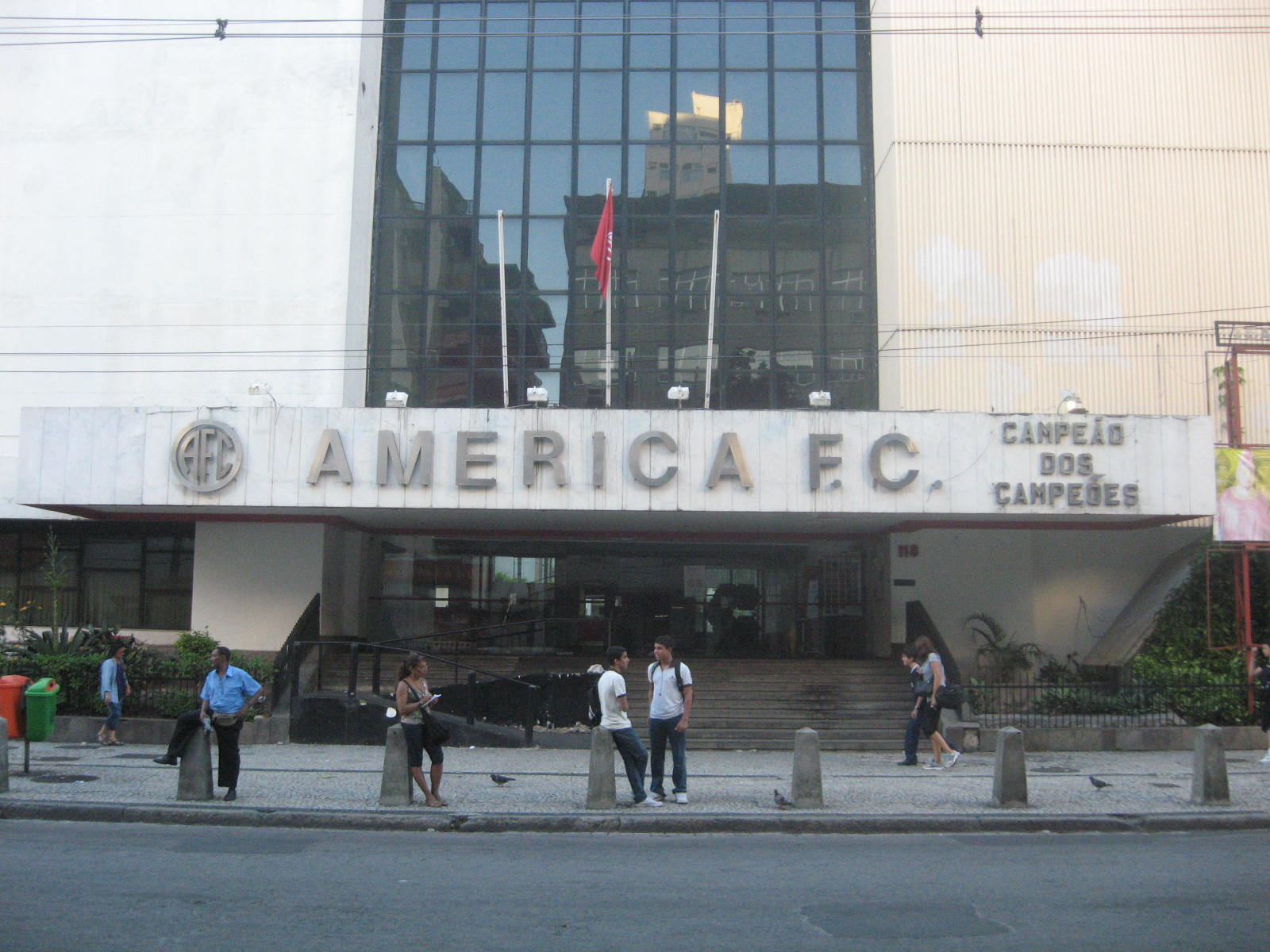
Former club headquarters

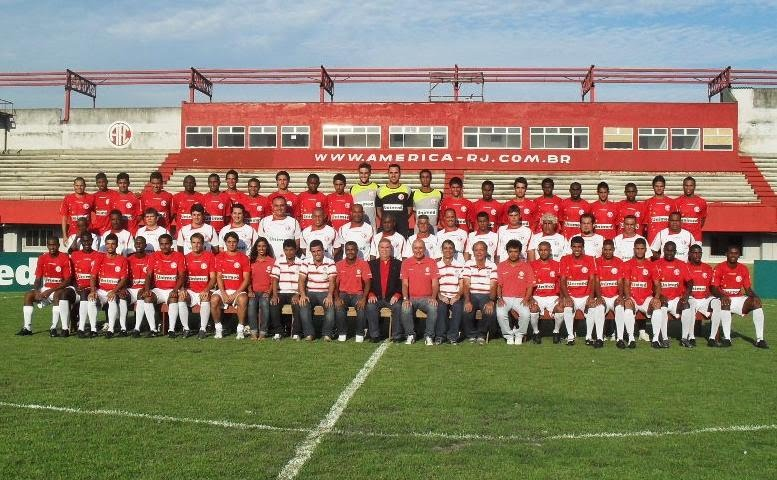
Team photo from the 2009 season

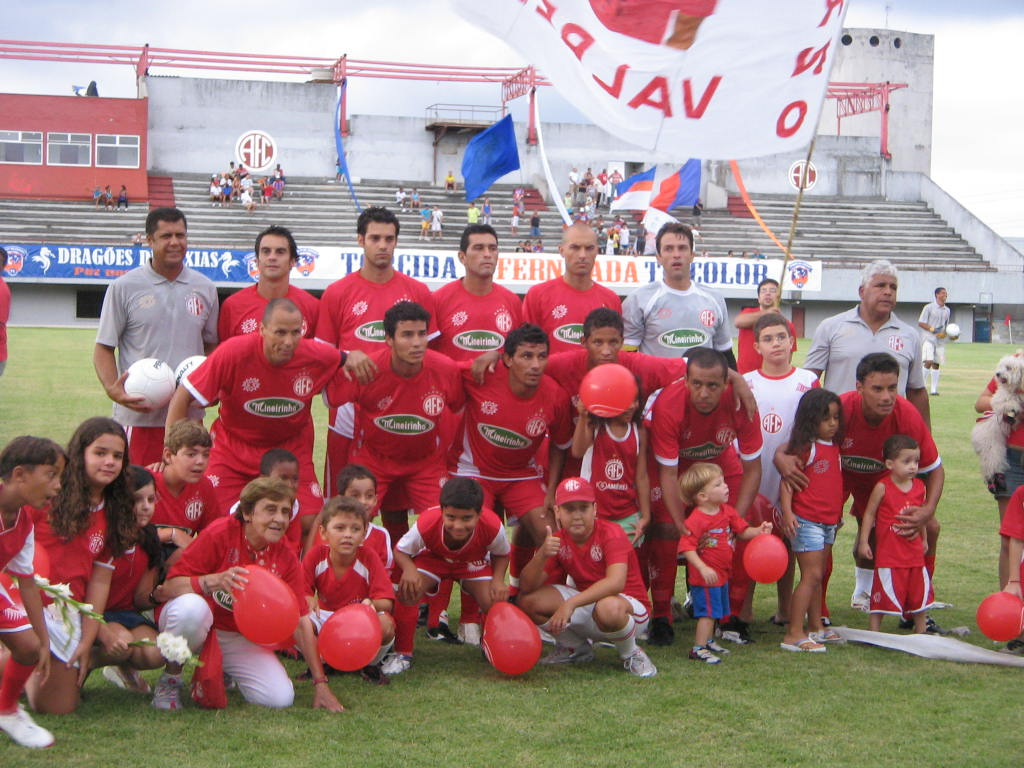
Team photo from the 2008 season

America Football Club, usually abbreviated to America-RJ or simply America, is a Brazilian football team based in the city of Rio de Janeiro, in the northern neighborhood of Tijuca. The team competes in Campeonato Carioca Série A2, the second tier of the Rio de Janeiro state football league.

Founded on 18 September 1904, the club competed in the Campeonato Brasileiro Série A several times, winning the state championship seven times. The club's home stadium is the Estádio Giulite Coutinho, which has a capacity of 16,000. They play in red shirts, white shorts and red socks.

The football anthem composer Lamartine Babo was a supporter of America. America's mascot is a devil. America also sponsors a beach American football team, the America Red Lions.

== History ==
On 18 September 1904, Alberto Koltzbucher, Alfredo Guilherme Koehler, Alfredo Mohrsted, Gustavo Bruno Mohrsted, Henrique Mohrsted, Jayme Faria Machado and Oswaldo Mohrsted founded America Football Club. In 1905, America, together with Bangu, Botafogo, Petrópolis, Fluminense and Futebol Atlético Clube founded Liga de Football do Rio de Janeiro (Rio de Janeiro Football League), which was the first football federation of Rio de Janeiro. In 1913, the club won the state championship for the first time.

For the 1971 season, the club competed in the national Championship's first edition, finishing in 11th place.

The yellow star just above their emblem represents their win in the Tournament of the Champions (Torneio dos Campeões) in 1982, which was a tournament organized by CBF to serve as a preview to the Campeonato Brasileiro Série A tournament. Flamengo declined the invitation so America, the team with the best record after the selected teams, was invited to fill the spot. America won the tournament by beating Guarani in overtime at Maracanã stadium.

In 2006, America was the runner-up of Taça Guanabara. America played the final against Botafogo.

In 2008, America suffered a major blow by being relegated to the Second Division of the Campeonato Carioca. However, they won the Second Division in 2009, thus being promoted to the first level in 2010. However, the club was relegated again in 2011 and wouldn't return to the top flight until 2015. The team has since been a yo-yo club and, as of 2024, is in the second tier of Rio de Janeiro football.

== Honours ==
=== Official tournaments ===
National
Competitions	Titles	Seasons
Torneio dos Campeões	1	1982
Inter-state
Competitions	Titles	Seasons
Taça Ioduran	1^{s}	1917
State
Competitions	Titles	Seasons
Campeonato Carioca	7	1913, 1916, 1922, 1928, 1931, 1935, 1960
Campeonato Carioca Série A2	3	2009, 2015, 2018

- record

=== Others tournaments ===
==== International ====
- Peruvian Press (1): 1955
- Bogotá Quadrangular (1): 1961
- Medellin Quadrangular (1): 1961
- International Soccer League (1): 1962
- Torneio Internacional Negrão de Lima (1): 1967
- TAP Cup (1): 1973
- Costa Dorada–Terragona Tournament (1): 1983
- Haiti Triangular (1): 1998

==== National ====
- Torneio Quadrangular Presidente Costa e Silva (1): 1968
- Torneio Luís Viana Filho (1): 1968

==== Inter-state ====
- Taça Ioduran (1): 1917
- Taça dos Campeões Estaduais Rio–São Paulo (1): 1935

==== State ====
- Taça Guanabara (1): 1974
- Taça Rio (1): 1982
- Third Round of the Campeonato Carioca (1): 1955
- Torneio Extra (2): 1938, 1952
- Torneio Relâmpago (1): 1945
- Taça Jayme de Carvalho (1): 1976
- Troféu João Ellis Filho (1): 2010
- Torneio Início (1): 1949
- Taça Santos Dumont (1): 2019
- Taça Corcovado (1): 2017
- Torneio Extra Capital (1): 2013

=== Runners-up ===
- Campeonato Carioca (8): 1911, 1914, 1917, 1921, 1929, 1950, 1954, 1955
- Copa Rio (1): 2025
- Campeonato Carioca Série A2 (3): 1906, 2017, 2019

== Current squad ==
According to the CBF register.

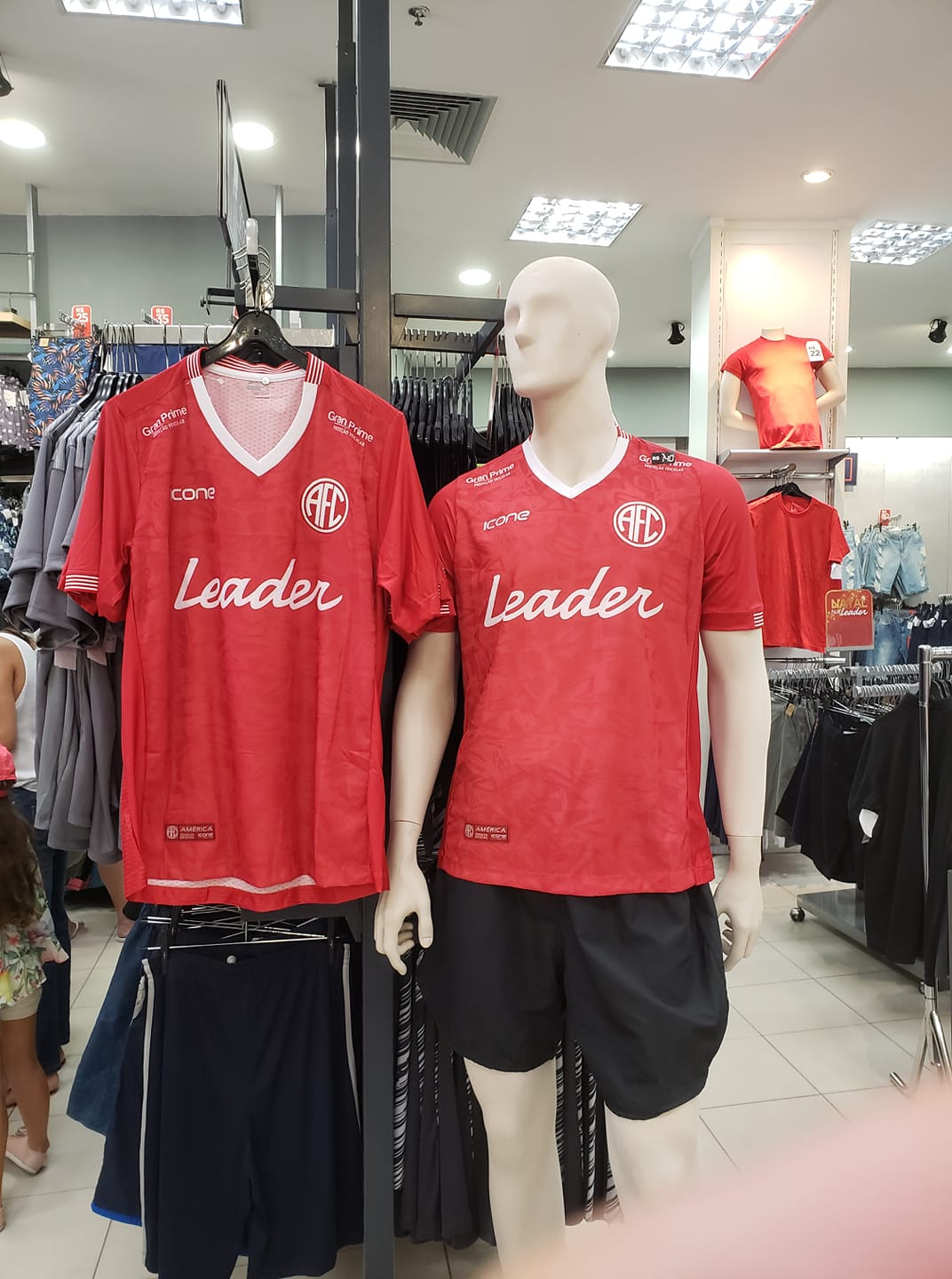
America 2020 shirt.

Note: Flags indicate national team as defined under FIFA eligibility rules; some limited exceptions apply. Players may hold more than one non-FIFA nationality.

No.	Pos.	Nation	Player
—	FW	BRA	Romário
—	GK	BRA	Luis Henrique
—	GK	BRA	Felipe Eduardo
—	DF	BRA	Matheus Menezes (on loan from Botafogo)
—	DF	BRA	Erick (on loan from Botafogo)
—	DF	BRA	Marcão
—	DF	BRA	Enric
—	DF	BRA	Fábio Braz
—	DF	BRA	Wagner Diniz
—	MF	BRA	PH
—	MF	BRA	Muniz
—	MF	ARG	Matías Sosa
—	MF	BRA	Darlan

No.	Pos.	Nation	Player
—	MF	BRA	Victor Pucinelli
—	MF	BRA	Leandro Aguiar
—	MF	BRA	Thiago Accioli
—	MF	BRA	Ramon Fraga
—	MF	BRA	Richarlyson
—	FW	BRA	Russo
—	FW	BRA	Renato
—	FW	BRA	Marcelinho Quarterole
—	FW	BRA	Igor
—	FW	BRA	Daniel
—	FW	BRA	Romarinho
—	FW	BRA	Jean

== Top goalscorers ==
1. Luisinho Lemos : 311
2. Edu : 212
3. Maneco : 187
4. Plácido: 167
5. Carola : 158
6. Chiquinho : 102

== Highest attendances ==
1. America 1–4 Flamengo, 147.661(139,599 people seated), April 4, 1956
2. America 0–2 Fluminense, 141,689 (120,178 people seated), June 9, 1968
3. America 1–2 Vasco, 121,765 (104,775 people seated), January 28, 1951
4. America 1–0 Flamengo, 104,532, April 25, 1976
5. America 5–1 Flamengo, 102,002 (94,516 people seated), April 1, 1956
6. America 2–1 Bonsucesso, 101.363, July 25, 1973
7. America 2–0 Fluminense, 100,635 (92,516 people seated), March 17, 1956
8. America 2–1 Fluminense, 98,099, December 18, 1960
9. America 1–0 Fluminense, 97,681, September 22, 1974
10. America 0–1 Fluminense, 96,035, April 27, 1975
11. America 4–2 Benfica (POR), 94,642 (87,686 people seated), July 3, 1955
12. America 1–1 Flamengo, 93,393, May 19, 1969

== Mascot ==
One controversial aspect of the club is the official mascot: the Diabo (devil), depicted as a red demon complete with horns, pointy beard, curled moustache, a long fat arrow-pointed tail, hooved feet and a black cape. The club's old stadium was nicknamed Caldeirão do Diabo ("Devil's Cauldron"). In 2006 some of the club's fans, supported by then-manager Jorginho who is an Evangelical Christian, attempted to replace the diabo with a bald eagle, claiming that the devil was "unlucky". However, as the "diabo" is a traditional part of the club's story and with the original mascot the club conquered its greatest achievements and there was no change in the club's fortunes with the new mascot, the replacement was abandoned and it was considered that Jorginho's opinion was motivated by "religious fanaticism".

== Clubs named after America ==
America is the Brazilian club with the largest number of other clubs named after it. It has homonyms in Natal, São José do Rio Preto, Três Rios, Manaus, Teófilo Otoni and Fortaleza.
