= Associação Atlética das Palmeiras =

AA das Palmeiras
- Full name: Associação Atlética das Palmeiras
- Founded: 9 November 1902; 122 years ago
- Dissolved: 1933; 92 years ago
- Ground: Avenida Angélica (1902–1906); Chácara da Floresta (1906–1929)
- League: Campeonato Paulista (1904–1933)
Home colours	Away colours	Third colours

Associação Atlética das Palmeiras, A. A. das Palmeiras or simply AA das Palmeiras was a football club based in São Paulo, Brazil. Founded on November 9, 1902, its colors were black and white. It was São Paulo champion of three times: 1909, 1910 and 1915.

Their principal uniform had a white shirt with a black horizontal stripe, black shorts, and socks, similar to the traditional Paraguayan Club Olimpia uniform. For the second color, played in a black shirt, black shorts, and white socks, and also played with an alternative uniform in the 1909 Campeonato Paulista campaign: shirt with the left half black and the right half white, white shorts and black socks.

== History ==
AA das Palmeiras entered in the Campeonato Paulista for the first time in 1904. It originally constituted some of the most traditional families of the city. His first ground was on Av. Angélica, where at the time there were only farms and empty lots. But the team was not a common lowland team, it constantly played against the reserve squads of the teams that compose the Liga Paulista and obtained good results. Its characteristic as an elite team can be evidenced by the fact that, until 1915, only doctoral students, engineers, and law graduates could play for them.

== Legacy for football ==
=== SE Palmeiras ===
In 1916, Associação Atlética das Palmeiras supports the newly founded club SS Palestra Itália to gain a spot to compete in the Campeonato Paulista professional for the first time. This fact would be remembered in 1942 when Palestra Itália was forced to change its name due to World War II (and the fact that the Brazil integrates the allied forces), Palestra Itália changed the name to the current SE Palmeiras, in honor of A.A. das Palmeiras.

=== São Paulo FC ===
With the end of the amateur era of Brazilian football in 1930, and the disbanding of the most successful team so far, CA Paulistano, and also of the AA das Palmeiras itself, the dissident players of both clubs became the current São Paulo FC. The red color of São Paulo represents CA Paulistano faction, and the black AA das Palmeiras faction. The club's stadium, Chácara da Floresta, came to São Paulo in 1930.

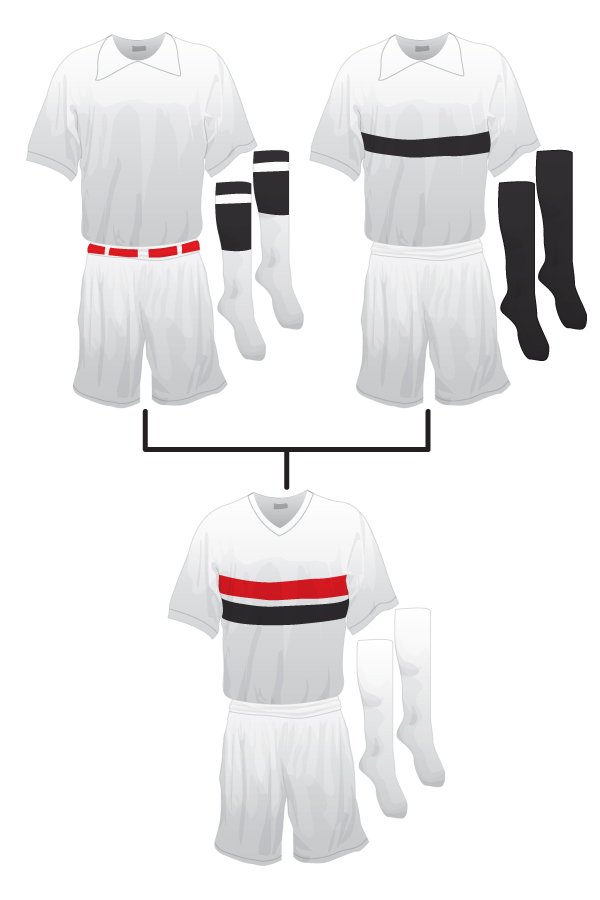
The São Paulo FC main uniform emerged from the mix of CA Paulistano — the red stripe — and the AA das Palmeiras — the black stripe.

== The last appearance ==
The club's last appearance was in the 1933 Campeonato Paulista, of the newly created Federação Paulista de Foot-Ball (FPF). Unfortunately, the club ended up dissolving during the end of the first round of the dispute, leaving football forever since then.

== Honours ==
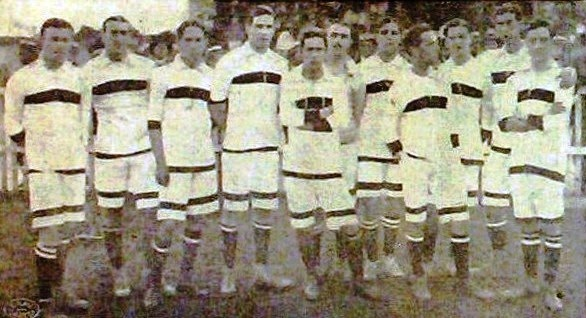
AA das Palmeiras – 1915 Campeonato Paulista champions

=== Inter-state ===
- Taça Salutaris
  - Winners (1): 1911

=== State ===
- Campeonato Paulista
  - Winners (3): 1909, 1910, 1915
- Torneio Início
  - Winners (3): 1922, 1923, 1925

== Campeonato Paulista total appearances ==
AA das Palmeiras participated for 24 times of the tournament.

1904	1905	1906	1907	1908	1909	1910	1911	1912	1913 (APSA)	1914 (APSA)	1915 (APSA)	1916 (APSA)	1917	1918	1919	1920	1921	1922	1923	1924	1925	1926 (LAF)	1927 (LAF)	1928 (LAF)	1929 (LAF)	1930	1931	1932	1933 (FPF)
6	6	6	-	-	1	1	6	-	3	6	1	7	5	3	9	8	9	5	8	9	12	5	6	12	9	-	-	-	7

== Players ==
For 4 times a player from AA das Palmeiras made the top scorer of the Campeonato Paulista:

- Eurico, 10 goals in 1910
- Luiz, 3 goals in 1913
- Nazaré, 13 goals in 1915
- Miguel, 13 goals in 1933

And more 5 players served Brazil national football team:

- Octávio Egydio (vs. Argentina, first Brazil official match, 1914)
- Demosthenes (at 1916 South American Championship)
- Ítalo and Nazaré (vs. Dublin FC and Sportivo Barracas, unofficial friendlies, 1917)
- Alexy (vs. Paraguay, at Copa Rodrigues Alves, 1922)
