= Associação Atlética São Bento =

São Bento
- Full name: Associação Atlética São Bento
- Founded: 1914
- Dissolved: 1935
- Ground: Floresta, São Paulo, Brazil
- Capacity: 2,000
Home colours

Associação Atlética São Bento, was an association football club from the Brazilian metropolis São Paulo. The club existed between 1914 and 1935 and won the State Championship of São Paulo in 1914 and twice.

== History ==
Associação Atlética São Bento were founded in 1914 by Father Katon, professor at the high school São Bento at the place of the same name downtown São Paulo.

From 1914 on the club played 317 matches in the State Championship until it ceased operations in 1935 after the official professionalisation of football in São Paulo.

A notable player of the championship winning team of 1925 was Luís Macedo Matoso "Feitiço", who was with the club from 1923 to 1926 and was top-scorer of the championship in all these three years.

On 4 June 1916 São Bento was opponent of CR Flamengo of Rio de Janeiro on the occasion of the inauguration of the Stadium on the Rua Paysandu in the quarter of Flamengo. Flamengo wore then for the first time their today traditional red and black hooped jerseys and won the match 3–1.

== Stadium ==
São Bento played their home games at Estádio da Floresta, which was also the first homeground of the São Paulo FC. It had a capacity of 15,000 from 1915 forward.

== Honours ==
=== Inter-state ===
- Taça dos Campeões Estaduais Rio–São Paulo
  - Winners (1): 1914

=== State ===
- Campeonato Paulista
  - Winners (2): 1914, 1925
  - Runners-up (1): 1916
- Taça Competência
  - Winners (1): 1925
