= Club Athletico Paulistano =

Sports and social club in São Paulo, Brazil

Paulistano
- An editor has nominated the above file for discussion of its purpose and/or potential deletion. You are welcome to participate in the discussion and help reach a consensus.
- Full name: Club Athletico Paulistano
- Founded: 29 December 1900; 125 years ago
- Ground: Football: Velódromo (1900–1915); Jardim América (1915–1930)
- Location: São Paulo, Brazil
- Activities: List: artistic gymnastics; badminton; basque pelota; basketball; boxing; chess; fencing; football (formerly); golf; martial arts; rowing; squash; swimming; tennis; track and field; volleyball; waterpolo
- Chairman: Emílio Machado Julianelli
- Colors: (White, Crayola)
- Website: www.paulistano.org.br

Club Athletico Paulistano
| Home colours | Away colours |

Club Athletico Paulistano, generally known as just Paulistano, is a Brazilian sports and social club based in São Paulo. The club is located in the quarter of Jardim América.

The club was founded on 29 December 1900 for the purpose of playing association football. Its team was one of the early pioneers of the sport in Brazil and was considered the nationally leading side around 1920. To date, Paulistano remains the only club that won the São Paulo state championship four consecutive times, and the team is still the fifth most successful team in the history of the tournament, only behind the state's four big teams of Corinthians, Palmeiras, São Paulo and Santos. In the course of the professionalisation of the sport in Brazil, the club closed its football department after 1929.

Since then, basketball has developed into the leading sport practised by Paulistano. Further to that, the club these days maintains departments for artistic gymnastics, badminton, basque pelota, boxing, chess, fencing, golf, martial arts, rowing, squash, swimming, tennis, track and field, volleyball and waterpolo, among other activities.

== History ==
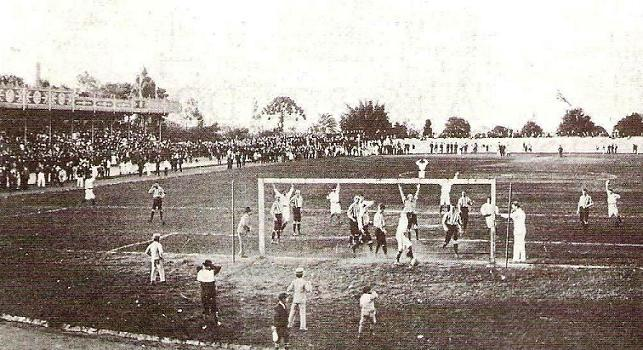
Paulistano scores a goal v. Sao Paulo AC in the final of 1905 Campeonato Paulista.

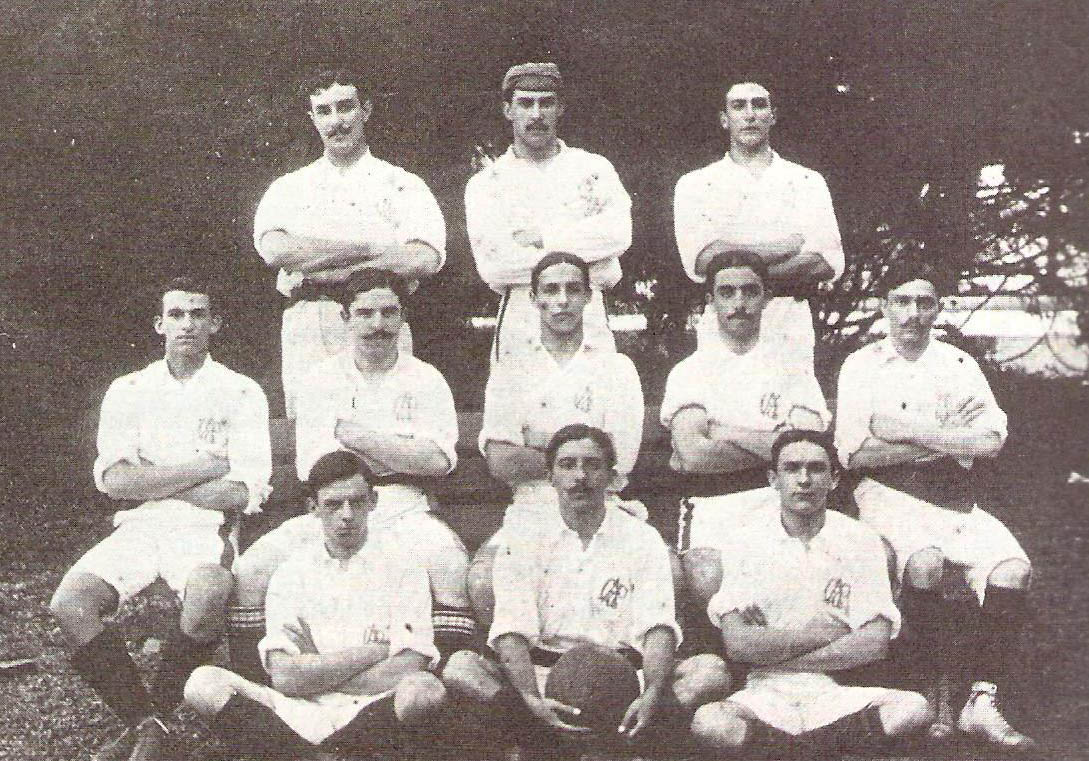
The team that won the first Campeonato Paulista for the club in 1905.

Under the leadership of the Englishman Charles William Miller representing the São Paulo Athletic Club (SPAC), Paulistano, together with SC Internacional, AA Mackenzie College and SC Germânia founded in 1901 the Liga Paulista de Foot-Ball (LPF), the first football league in Brazil. In 1902 the first championship of São Paulo was held and the São Paulo Athletic club secured the first three titles, with Paulistano being runner up on each occasion. 1905 was the year when Paulistano won its first championship after all. 1907 Paulistano made the Briton John Hamilton coach of the team, which is believed to be the first appointment of a professional trainer by a Brazilian team. Further championships followed in 1908 and 1913.

In 1914 there was a schism in the football of São Paulo as the LPF was averse to accepting new members and thus the broadening of the base of the game. Paulistano joined the competing, generally accessible league under the auspices of the Associação Paulista de Esportes Atléticos (APEA). In 1917 the LPF should dissolve and integrate into the APEA, which proved far more attractive. From 1916 to 1919 Paulistano won four consecutive championships, a feat hitherto unrivalled. A major contributor to this success was Arthur Friedenreich, these days counted among the all-time greats of football, who became six times top-scorer of the São Paulo championship during his time with the club.

In this era Paulistano also won the Taça Ioduran of 1918, a cup for the winner of a match between the champions of São Paulo and Rio de Janeiro, and in 1920 the Copa dos Campeões Estaduais, the Cup of State Champions, which also included the champion of Rio Grande do Sul. In both cases Paulistano defeated Fluminense FC from Rio in the decisive match.

Football kit
(1900–30)

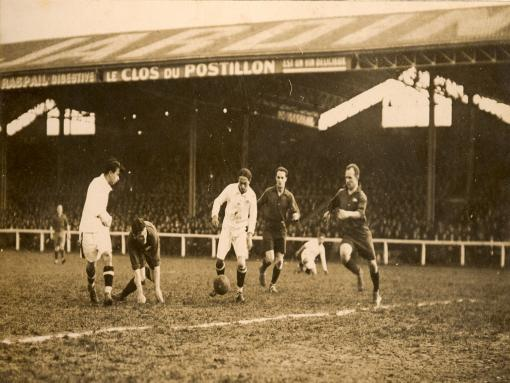
Arthur Friedenreich carrying the ball v. French club Stáde Français in 1925.

In March and April 1925 Paulistano as first Brazilian side toured continental Europe, a trip that to date forms a major part of the club's folklore. Paulistano, re-inforced with Araken Patusca from Santos FC and three far less prominent players from Rio's CR Flamengo, won nine out of ten matches in France, Switzerland and Portugal, encountering and defeating also the national selections of their first two countries. On the occasion of the match against France in Paris, defeating the hosts 7–1, Brazilian football was seen as revelation, and Arthur Friedenreich was pronounced by the local press le roi du football, the "king of football". Arakén was described as "Le Danger". Another one of Paulistano's stars on this tour was Anfilogino "Filó" Guarisi, who later should play in Italy and win the World Cup of 1934.

On their return to São Paulo there was another break up in the state football. Most clubs opted for official professionalisation. Few clubs resisted, among them Paulistano. Under the leadership of Paulistano, the amateur league Liga dos Amadores de Futebol was founded. The fellow footballing pioneers of SC Gêrmania and AA das Palmeiras joined the club from the APEA and played with five other clubs from 1926 in this break-away league. Paulistano won three of the tournaments until 1929, and the SC Internacional, which joined in 1927, won in 1928 its second state title after 1907. However, amateur football proved not viable and with the formal dissolution of the league in early January 1930 Paulistano shut down its football operations, too.

By the end of the month some members, sympathisers and players like Friedenreich from Paulistano and AA das Palmeiras joined to form the São Paulo FC, then known as São Paulo da Floresta, a club which in later years became one of the most prominent clubs in Brazilian and South American football.

== Stadium ==
Paulistano initially played their home games at Velódromo, located in São Paulo. The stadium had a maximum capacity of 10,000 people. It was inaugurated on 18 October 1901 for the practice of football, and was demolished in 1916. On 29 December 1917, the club inaugurated a new stadium, named Estádio Jardim América. It had a maximum capacity of 15,000 people, and was demolished in 1950.

== Tennis ==
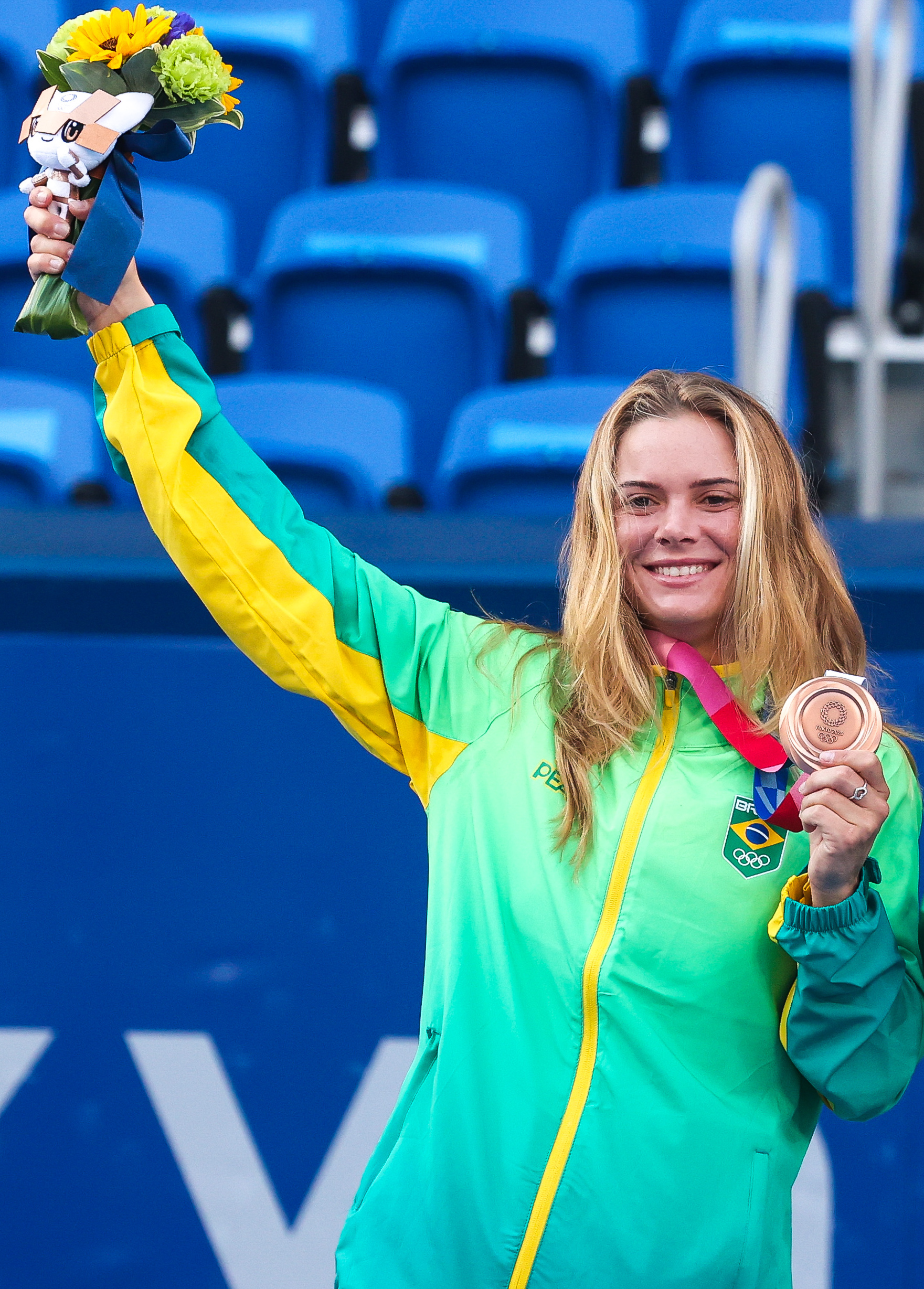
Laura Pigossi during the Tokyo 2020 Summer Olympics

Another noteworthy sport is tennis, which has brought to light several prominent names in its history, such as Nelson Cruz, one of Brazil's players in the country's first participation in the Davis Cup; Armando Vieira, one of the pioneers in competing internationally and introducing foreign techniques to Brazilian tennis; Cecy Carvalho, a São Paulo and Brazilian champion who captained the CAP elite team for thirteen consecutive years; and Laura Pigossi, a club member who, alongside Luisa Stefani, won the first Olympic medal in tennis for Brazil in history at the Tokyo 2020 Olympics. Additionally, Pigossi began her tennis training at Paulistano.

== Basketball ==
Club Athletico Paulistano has an active men's basketball team. As one of their sponsors is Unimed, the club is named Paulistano/Unimed. The team is one of the basketball teams of Novo Basquete Brasil, the Brazilian basketball league.

== Honours ==
=== National ===
- Copa dos Campeões Estaduais
  - Winners (1): 1920

=== Inter-state ===
- Taça Ioduran
  - Winners (1): 1918

=== State ===
- Campeonato Paulista
  - Winners (11): 1905, 1908, 1913, 1916, 1917, 1918, 1919, 1921 1926, 1927, 1929
  - Runners-up (10): 1902, 1903, 1904, 1907, 1909, 1912, 1914, 1920, 1924, 1928
- Taça Competência
  - Winners (3): 1918, 1919, 1921
- Torneio Início
  - Winners (3): 1924, 1926, 1927

== See also ==
- Club Athletico Paulistano (basketball)
