= SC Internacional (SP) =

Internacional
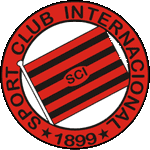
- Full name: Sport Club Internacional
- Founded: 19 August 1899
- Dissolved: 1933; 93 years ago
- Ground: Estádio da Floresta, São Paulo, Brazil
- Capacity: 2,000
Home colors	Away colors

Sport Club Internacional, commonly known as Internacional, was a Brazilian football team from São Paulo, São Paulo state. They competed several times in the Campeonato Paulista and won the competition twice.

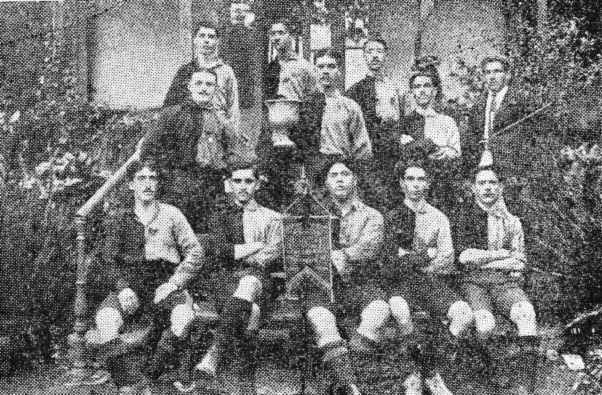
One of the first teams of the club.

== History ==
Sport Club Internacional was founded on August 19, 1899. They won the Campeonato Paulista for the first time in 1907, and in 1928, when the league was organized by LAF. The club played 370 Campeonato Paulista games between 1902 and 1932. Internacional, due to financial difficulties, merged with Antarctica Futebol Clube in 1933, and the new club was named Clube Atlético Paulista.

== Stadium ==
Internacional played their home games at Estádio da Floresta. The stadium had a maximum capacity of 2,000 people.

== Honours ==
- Campeonato Paulista
  - Winners (2): 1907, 1928
  - Runners-up (1): 1906
- Torneio Início
  - Winners (1): 1928
