= Sport Club Americano =

Americano
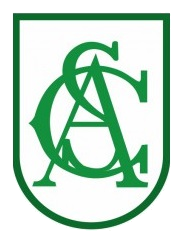
- Full name: Sport Club Americano
- Founded: 21 May 1903
- Dissolved: 1916; 109 years ago
- Ground: Velódromo Paulistano, São Paulo, São Paulo state, Brazil
- Capacity: 10,000
Home colors

Sport Club Americano, commonly known as Americano, was a Brazilian football club from São Paulo, São Paulo state. They won the Campeonato Paulista twice.

== History ==
The club was founded on May 21, 1903 in Santos. However, in 1908 moved from Santos to São Paulo due to the difficulties in climbing Serra do Mar to play the regional tournament games in São Paulo.

From 1911 to 1916, Americano did not lose a single game, they played 23 games, won 15 and drew the other eight. They won the Campeonato Paulista in 1912, and in 1913. After competing in the Campeonato Paulista for the last time in 1916, the club stopped its activities.

== Honours ==
=== Inter-state ===
- Taça dos Campeões Estaduais Rio–São Paulo
  - Winners (1): 1912

=== State ===
- Campeonato Paulista
  - Winners (2): 1912, 1913
  - Runners-up (3): 1907, 1910, 1911

== Stadium ==
Sport Club Americano played their home games at Velódromo Paulistano. The stadium had a maximum capacity of 10,000 people.
