= 1922 South American Championship squads =

List of footballers

These are the squads for the countries that played in the 1922 South American Championship held in Brazil. The participating countries were Argentina, Brazil, Chile and Uruguay. The teams plays in a single round-robin tournament, earning two points for a win, one point for a draw, and zero points for a loss.

== Argentina ==
Head Coach: n/i (Note: The first appointed coach of the Argentina national team was Ángel Vásquez in 1924.)

No.	Pos.	Player	Date of birth (age)	Caps	Goals	Club
—	DF	Pedro Castoldi		0	0	(Argentine Football Association) Sportivo Barracas
—	DF	Adolfo Celli	31 December 1896 (aged 25)	6	0	(Argentine Football Association) Newell's Old Boys
—	MF	Ernesto Celli	10 July 1895 (aged 27)	2	1	(Argentine Football Association) Newell's Old Boys
—	MF	Alfredo Chabrolín		0	0	(Argentine Football Association) Newell's Old Boys
—	FW	Ángel Chiessa	1 January 1902 (aged 20)	0	0	(Argentine Football Association) Huracán
—	DF	Marcelo De Césari		0	0	(Argentine Football Association) Boca Juniors
—	MF	Miguel Dellavalle	1 December 1898 (aged 23)	6	1	(Argentine Football Association) Belgrano (C)
—	FW	Juan Francia	20 March 1897 (aged 25)	2	0	(Argentine Football Association) Rosario Central
—	FW	José Gaslini		0	0	(Argentine Football Association) Alvear
—	FW	Julio Libonatti	5 July 1901 (aged 21)	11	8	(Argentine Football Association) Newell's Old Boys
—	DF	Ángel Médici	20 December 1897 (aged 24)	0	0	(Argentine Football Association) Boca Juniors
—	FW	Julio Rivet		0	0	(Argentine Football Association) Del Plata
—	FW	Nicolás Rofrano		5	0	(Argentine Football Association) Alvear
—	DF	Florencio Sarasíbar	10 November 1895 (aged 26)	0	0	(Argentine Football Association) Rosario Central
—	MF	Emilio Solari	4 January 1900 (aged 22)	3	0	(Argentine Football Association) Nueva Chicago
—	GK	Américo Tesoriere	18 March 1899 (aged 23)	11	0	(Argentine Football Association) Boca Juniors

== Brazil ==
Head coach: (Brazil) Laís

No.	Pos.	Player	Date of birth (age)	Caps	Goals	Club
—	MF	Amílcar	29 March 1893 (aged 29)	11	2	(Brazilian Football Confederation) Corinthians
—	DF	Barthô	28 January 1899 (aged 23)	0	0	(Brazilian Football Confederation) São Bento (SP)
—	DF	Chico Netto	9 April 1894 (aged 28)	4	0	(Brazilian Football Confederation) Fluminense
—	FW	Formiga	9 March 1895 (aged 27)	0	0	(Brazilian Football Confederation) Paulistano
—	DF	Fortes	9 September 1901 (aged 21)	6	0	(Brazilian Football Confederation) Fluminense
—	FW	Friedenreich	18 July 1892 (aged 30)	10	5	(Brazilian Football Confederation) Paulistano
—	FW	Heitor	20 December 1898 (aged 23)	4	1	(Brazilian Football Confederation) Palestra Itália
—	FW	Junqueira	12 June 1900 (aged 22)	3	0	(Brazilian Football Confederation) Flamengo
—	GK	Kuntz	3 September 1897 (aged 25)	7	0	(Brazilian Football Confederation) Flamengo
—	MF	Laís	11 November 1899 (aged 22)	4	0	(Brazilian Football Confederation) Fluminense
—	GK	Marcos Mendonça	25 December 1894 (aged 27)	7	0	(Brazilian Football Confederation) Fluminense
—	FW	Neco	7 March 1895 (aged 27)	8	7	(Brazilian Football Confederation) Corinthians
—	MF	Nesi	15 November 1902 (aged 19)	0	0	(Brazilian Football Confederation) São Cristóvão
—	DF	Palamone	21 March 1898 (aged 24)	1	0	(Brazilian Football Confederation) Botafogo
—	FW	Rodrigues	16 May 1894 (aged 28)	0	0	(Brazilian Football Confederation) Corinthians
—	FW	Tatú	16 July 1898 (aged 24)	0	0	(Brazilian Football Confederation) Corinthians
—	DF	Xingô	14 September 1900 (aged 22)	0	0	(Brazilian Football Confederation) Pelotas
—	FW	Zezé I	2 May 1899 (aged 23)	6	1	(Brazilian Football Confederation) Fluminense

== Chile ==
Head Coach: (Uruguay) Juan Carlos Bertone

No.	Pos.	Player	Date of birth (age)	Caps	Goals	Club
—	MF	Enrique Abello		5	0	(Football Federation of Chile) Magallanes
—	GK	René Balbotín		0	0	(Football Federation of Chile) Bádminton
—	GK	Guillermo Bernal		0	0	(Football Federation of Chile) Jorge V
—	FW	Manuel Bravo		0	0	(Football Federation of Chile) Unión Coquimbo
—	MF	Carlos Catalán		0	0	(Football Federation of Chile) Fábrica de Vidrios
—	MF	Aurelio Domínguez	31 May 1896 (aged 26)	6	1	(Football Federation of Chile) Artillero de Costa
—	MF	Humberto Elgueta	29 October 1895 (aged 26)	3	0	(Football Federation of Chile) Gold Cross Football Club
—	FW	Luis Encina		1	0	(Football Federation of Chile) Norteamérica
—	MF	Óscar González	24 August 1894 (aged 28)	0	0	(Football Federation of Chile) La Cruz Football Club
—	DF	Ulises Poirier	2 February 1897 (aged 25)	6	0	(Football Federation of Chile) La Cruz Football Club
—	FW	Manuel Ramírez		0	0	(Football Federation of Chile) Centro de Torneros
—	FW	Víctor Varas		5	0	(Football Federation of Chile) Artillero de Costa
—	DF	Pedro Vergara		3	0	(Football Federation of Chile) Eleuterio Ramírez
—	DF	Víctor Zavala		0	0	(Football Federation of Chile) Linares FC

== Paraguay ==
Head Coach: (Paraguay) Manuel Fleitas Solich

No.	Pos.	Player	Date of birth (age)	Caps	Goals	Club
—	MF	Isidoro Benítez Casco		3	0	(Paraguayan Football Association) Libertad
—	FW	Luciano Capdevila		0	0	(Paraguayan Football Association) Cerro Porteño
—	MF	Roque Centurión Miranda	15 August 1900 (aged 22)	0	0	(Paraguayan Football Association) Guaraní
—	GK	Modesto Denis	9 March 1901 (aged 21)	0	0	(Paraguayan Football Association) Nacional
—	FW	Carlos Elizeche		0	0	(Paraguayan Football Association) Atlántida
—	FW	Enrique Erico		0	0	(Paraguayan Football Association) Nacional
—	MF	Manuel Fleitas Solich	30 December 1900 (aged 21)	3	0	(Paraguayan Football Association) Nacional
—	FW	Luis Fretes		0	0	(Paraguayan Football Association) Guaraní
—	DF	Ramón González		3	0	(Paraguayan Football Association)
—	FW	Ildefonso López		3	1	(Paraguayan Football Association) Guaraní
—	DF	César Mena Porta		0	0	(Paraguayan Football Association) Olimpia
—	DF	Venancio Paredes		3	0	(Paraguayan Football Association) Guaraní
—	FW	Julio Ramírez		0	0	(Paraguayan Football Association) Nacional
—	FW	Gerardo Rivas	24 September 1905 (aged 16)	3	1	(Paraguayan Football Association) Libertad
—	FW	Daniel Schaerer		3	0	(Paraguayan Football Association) Olimpia

== Uruguay ==
Head Coach: (Uruguay) Pedro Olivieri

No.	Pos.	Player	Date of birth (age)	Caps	Goals	Club
—	MF	Antonio Aguerre		1	0	(Uruguayan Football Association) Liverpool
—	GK	Fausto Batignani	2 July 1903 (aged 19)	0	0	(Uruguayan Football Association) Liverpool
—	GK	Manuel Beloutas		3	0	(Uruguayan Football Association) Universal
—	DF	Fausto Broncini		7	0	(Uruguayan Football Association) Central Español
—	FW	Felipe Buffoni		1	1	(Uruguayan Football Association) Montevideo Wanderers
—	FW	Norberto Casanello		1	0	(Uruguayan Football Association) Montevideo Wanderers
—	FW	Juan Heguy		0	0	(Uruguayan Football Association) Central Español
—	FW	Rodolfo Marán	24 May 1897 (aged 25)	6	0	(Uruguayan Football Association) Nacional
—	DF	Alberto Nogués		0	0	(Uruguayan Football Association) Montevideo Wanderers
—	FW	Juan Otero		0	0	(Uruguayan Football Association) Central Español
—	FW	Ángel Romano	2 August 1893 (aged 29)	46	19	(Uruguayan Football Association) Nacional
—	MF	Pascual Somma	2 February 1899 (aged 23)	27	2	(Uruguayan Football Association) Nacional
—	DF	Domingo Tejera	9 July 1899 (aged 23)	1	0	(Uruguayan Football Association) Montevideo Wanderers
—	DF	Antonio Urdinarán	30 November 1898 (aged 23)	9	1	(Uruguayan Football Association) Nacional
—	MF	José Vanzzino	5 July 1893 (aged 29)	23	0	(Uruguayan Football Association) Nacional
—	MF	José Vidal	15 December 1896 (aged 25)	0	0	(Uruguayan Football Association) Belgrano
—	MF	Alfredo Zibechi	30 October 1895 (aged 26)	23	0	(Uruguayan Football Association) Nacional
