= Argentina national football team results (1920–1939) =

National football team results (1920–1939)

This page details the match results and statistics of the Argentina national football team from 1920 to 1939.

== Key ==
Key to matches

- Att.=Match attendance
- (H)=Home ground
- (A)=Away ground
- (N)=Neutral ground

Key to record by opponent

- Pld=Games played
- W=Games won
- D=Games drawn
- L=Games lost
- GF=Goals for
- GA=Goals against

== Results ==
Argentina's score is shown first in each case.

No.	Date	Venue	Opponents	Score	Competition	Argentina scorers	Att.	Ref.
83	18 July 1920	Parque Central, Montevideo (A)	Uruguay	0–2	Copa Premier Honor Uruguayo		—	
84	25 July 1920	Estadio Sportivo Barracas, Buenos Aires (H)	Uruguay	1–3	Copa Newton	Clarcke	—	
85	8 August 1920	Estadio Sportivo Barracas, Buenos Aires (H)	Uruguay	1–0	Copa Premier Honor Argentino	Calomino	—	
86	12 September 1920	Valparaiso Sporting Club, Viña del Mar (N)	Uruguay	1–1	1920 South American Championship	Echeverría	17,000	
87	20 September 1920	Valparaiso Sporting Club, Viña del Mar (N)	Chile	1–1	1920 South American Championship	Dellavalle	16,000	
88	25 September 1920	Valparaiso Sporting Club, Viña del Mar (N)	Brazil	2–0	1920 South American Championship	Echeverría, Libonatti	12,000	
89	7 April 1921	Asunción (A)	Paraguay	1–3	Friendly	Corbella	—	
90	14 April 1921	Asunción (A)	Paraguay	2–2	Friendly	Clarcke, Calomino	—	
91	2 October 1921	Estadio Sportivo Barracas, Buenos Aires (N)	Brazil	1–0	1921 South American Championship	Libonatti	20,000	
92	16 October 1921	Estadio Sportivo Barracas, Buenos Aires (N)	Paraguay	3–0	1921 South American Championship	Libonatti, Saruppo, Echeverría	25,000	
93	30 October 1921	Estadio Sportivo Barracas, Buenos Aires (N)	Uruguay	1–0	1921 South American Championship	Libonatti	35,000	
94	28 September 1922	Estádio das Laranjeiras, Rio de Janeiro (N)	Chile	4–0	1922 South American Championship	Chiessa, Francia (2), J. Gaslini	2,500	
95	8 October 1922	Estádio das Laranjeiras, Rio de Janeiro (N)	Uruguay	0–1	1922 South American Championship		14,000	
96	15 October 1922	Estádio das Laranjeiras, Rio de Janeiro (N)	Brazil	0–2	1922 South American Championship		25,000	
97	18 October 1922	Estádio das Laranjeiras, Rio de Janeiro (N)	Paraguay	2–0	1922 South American Championship	Francia (2)	8,000	
98	22 October 1922	Parque Antártica, São Paulo (A)	Brazil	1–2	Copa Julio Argentino Roca	Francia	—	
99	22 October 1922	Estadio Sportivo Barracas, Buenos Aires (H)	Chile	1–0	Friendly	Echverría	—	
100	12 November 1922	Parque Central, Montevideo (A)	Uruguay	0–1	Copa Lipton		—	
101	10 December 1922	Parque Central, Montevideo (A)	Uruguay	0–1	Copa Premier Honor Uruguayo		—	
102	17 December 1922	Estadio Sportivo Barracas, Buenos Aires (H)	Uruguay	2–2	Copa Newton	A. Badalini (2)	—	
103	20 May 1923	Estadio Sportivo Barracas, Buenos Aires (H)	Paraguay	0–2	Copa Rosa Chevallier Boutell		—	
104	25 May 1923	Estadio Sportivo Barracas, Buenos Aires (H)	Paraguay	1–0	Copa Rosa Chevallier Boutell	Izaguirre	—	
105	24 June 1923	Estadio Sportivo Barracas, Buenos Aires (H)	Uruguay	0–0	Copa Lipton		—	
106	15 July 1923	Estadio Sportivo Barracas, Buenos Aires (H)	Uruguay	2–2	Copa Ministro de Relaciones Exteriores	Izaguirre, Onzari	—	
107	22 July 1923	Parque Central, Montevideo (A)	Uruguay	2–2	Copa Premier Honor Uruguayo	D. Tarasconi, J. C. Irurieta	—	
108	30 September 1923	Parque Central, Montevideo (A)	Uruguay	2–0	Copa Premier Honor Uruguayo	Saruppo, A. López	—	
109	29 October 1923	Parque Central, Montevideo (N)	Paraguay	4–3	1923 South American Championship	Saruppo, Aguirre (3)	20,000	
110	18 November 1923	Parque Central, Montevideo (N)	Brazil	2–1	1923 South American Championship	Onzari, Saruppo	15,000	
111	2 December 1923	Parque Central, Montevideo (N)	Uruguay	0–2	1923 South American Championship		22,000	
112	2 December 1923	Estadio Sportivo Barracas, Buenos Aires (H)	Brazil	0–2	Copa Confraternidad		—	
113	8 December 1923	Estadio Racing Club, Avellaneda (H)	Uruguay	2–3	Copa Ministro de Relaciones Exteriores	Anunziata, Acosta	—	
114	9 December 1923	Estadio Sportivo Barracas, Buenos Aires (H)	Brazil	2–0	Copa Julio Argentino Roca	Dino (o.g.), Onzari	—	
115	15 May 1924	Asunción (A)	Paraguay	3–1	Copa Rosa Chevallier Boutell	Seoane, Onzari, Tarasconi	—	
116	18 May 1924	Asunción (A)	Paraguay	1–2	Copa Rosa Chevallier Boutell	Tarasconi	—	
117	25 May 1924	Parque Central, Montevideo (A)	Uruguay	0–2	Copa Newton		—	
118	25 May 1924	Estadio Sportivo Barracas, Buenos Aires (H)	Uruguay	4–0	Copa Newton	O. Goicoechea (3), Aguirre	—	
119	10 August 1924	Estadio Alvear y Tagle, Buenos Aires (H)	Uruguay	0–0	Copa Ministro de Relaciones Exteriores		—	
120	31 August 1924	Estadio Pocitos, Montevideo (A)	Uruguay	3–2	Copa Premier Honor Uruguayo	F. Lucarelli (2), Monti	—	
121	21 September 1924	Parque Central, Montevideo (A)	Uruguay	1–1	Friendly	Tarasconi	—	
122	2 October 1924	Estadio Sportivo Barracas, Buenos Aires (H)	Uruguay	2–1	Friendly	Onzari, Tarasconi	—	
123	12 October 1924	Parque Central, Montevideo (N)	Paraguay	0–0	1924 South American Championship		12,000	
124	25 October 1924	Parque Central, Montevideo (N)	Chile	2–0	1924 South American Championship	Sosa, Loyarte	15,000	
125	2 November 1924	Parque Central, Montevideo (N)	Uruguay	0–0	1924 South American Championship		20,000	
126	9 July 1925	Estadio Brandsen y Del Crucero, Buenos Aires (H)	Paraguay	1–1	Copa Rosa Chevallier Boutell	Evaristo	—	
127	12 July 1925	Estadio Sportivo Barracas, Buenos Aires (H)	Paraguay	1–1	Copa Rosa Chevallier Boutell	B. Gaslini	—	
128	29 November 1925	Estadio Brandsen y Del Crucero, Buenos Aires (N)	Paraguay	2–0	1925 South American Championship	Seoane, Sánchez	18,000	
129	13 December 1925	Estadio Sportivo Barracas, Buenos Aires (N)	Brazil	4–1	1925 South American Championship	Seoane (3), Garasini	25,000	
130	20 December 1925	Estadio Brandsen y Del Crucero, Buenos Aires (N)	Paraguay	3–1	1925 South American Championship	Tarasconi, Seoane, Irurieta	25,000	
131	25 December 1925	Estadio Sportivo Barracas, Buenos Aires (N)	Brazil	2–2	1925 South American Championship	Cerroti, Seoane	18,000	
132	29 May 1926	Estadio Brandsen y Del Crucero, Buenos Aires (H)	Paraguay	2–1	Copa Rosa Chevallier Boutell	Stagnaro, Cherro	—	
133	3 June 1926	Estadio Sportivo Barracas, Buenos Aires (H)	Paraguay	2–1	Copa Rosa Chevallier Boutell	Cesarini, Villagra	—	
134	16 October 1926	Estadio Sport de Ñuñoa, Santiago (N)	Bolivia	5–0	1926 South American Championship	Cherro (2), Sosa, Delgado, De Miguel	5,000	
135	20 October 1926	Estadio Sport de Ñuñoa, Santiago (N)	Paraguay	8–0	1926 South American Championship	Sosa (4), Cherro, Delgado (2), De Miguel	3,000	
136	24 October 1926	Estadio Sport de Ñuñoa, Santiago (N)	Uruguay	0–2	1926 South American Championship		15,000	
137	31 October 1926	Estadio Sport de Ñuñoa, Santiago (N)	Chile	1–1	1926 South American Championship	Tarasconi	8,000	
138	14 July 1927	Parque Central, Montevideo (A)	Uruguay	1–0	Copa Newton	Carricaberry	—	
139	30 August 1927	Estadio Brandsen y Del Crucero, Buenos Aires (H)	Uruguay	0–1	Copa Lipton		—	
140	30 October 1927	Estadio Nacional, Lima (N)	Bolivia	7–1	1927 South American Championship	Luna (2) Carricaberry (2), Recanatini, Seoane (2)	15,000	
141	20 November 1927	Estadio Nacional, Lima (N)	Uruguay	3–2	1927 South American Championship	Recanatini, Luna, Canavesi (o.g.)	26,000	
142	27 November 1927	Estadio Nacional, Lima (N)	Peru	5–1	1927 South American Championship	Ferreira (2), Maglio (2), Carricaberry	15,000	
143	1 April 1928	Estádio do Lumiar, Lisbon (A)	Portugal	0–0	Friendly		20,000	
144	29 May 1928	Olympic Stadium, Amsterdam (N)	United States	11–2	1928 Summer Olympics	Ferreira (2), Tarasconi (4), Orsi (2), Cherro (3)	3,848	
145	2 June 1928	Olympic Stadium, Amsterdam (N)	Belgium	6–3	1928 Summer Olympics	Tarasconi (4), Ferreira, Orsi	16,399	
146	6 June 1928	Olympic Stadium, Amsterdam (N)	Egypt	6–0	1928 Summer Olympics	Cherro, Ferreira (2), Tarasconi (3)	7,887	
147	10 June 1928	Olympic Stadium, Amsterdam (N)	Uruguay	1–1 (a.e.t.)	1928 Summer Olympics	Ferreira	25,250	
148	13 June 1928	Olympic Stadium, Amsterdam (N)	Uruguay	1–2	1928 Summer Olympics	Monti	25,110	
149	30 August 1928	Estadio de Independiente, Avellaneda (H)	Uruguay	1–0	Copa Newton	Seoane	—	
150	21 September 1928	Parque Central, Montevideo (A)	Uruguay	2–2	Copa Lipton	Maglio, Alonso	—	
151	16 June 1929	Estadio Gasómetro, Buenos Aires (H)	Uruguay	2–0	Copa Cámara de Diputados Argentina	Peucelle, Scopelli	—	
152	16 June 1929	Parque Central, Montevideo (A)	Uruguay	1–1	Copa Centro Automovilístico Uruguayo	Maglio	—	
153	20 September 1929	Parque Central, Montevideo (A)	Uruguay	1–2	Copa Newton	Maglio	—	
154	28 September 1929	Estadio Gasómetro, Buenos Aires (H)	Uruguay	0–0	Copa Lipton		—	
155	3 November 1929	Estadio Gasómetro, Buenos Aires (N)	Peru	3–0	1929 South American Championship	Peucelle, Zumelzú (2)	20,000	
156	10 November 1929	Estadio Gasómetro, Buenos Aires (N)	Paraguay	4–1	1929 South American Championship	M. Evaristo, Ferreira (2), Cherro	20,000	
157	17 November 1929	Estadio Gasómetro, Buenos Aires (N)	Uruguay	2–0	1929 South American Championship	Ferreira, M. Evaristo	60,000	
158	25 May 1930	Estadio Gasómetro, Buenos Aires (H)	Uruguay	1–1	Copa Newton	Varallo	—	
159	15 July 1930	Parque Central, Montevideo (N)	France	1–0	1930 FIFA World Cup	Monti	23,409	
160	19 July 1930	Estadio Centenario, Montevideo (N)	Mexico	6–3	1930 FIFA World Cup	Stábile (3), Zumelzú (2), Varallo	42,100	
161	22 July 1930	Estadio Centenario, Montevideo (N)	Chile	3–1	1930 FIFA World Cup	Stábile (2), M. Evaristo	41,459	
162	26 July 1930	Estadio Centenario, Montevideo (N)	United States	6–1	1930 FIFA World Cup	Monti, Scopelli, Stábile (2), Peucelle (2)	72,886	
163	30 July 1930	Estadio Centenario, Montevideo (N)	Uruguay	2–4	1930 FIFA World Cup	Peucelle, Stábile	68,346	
164	3 August 1930	Estadio Alvear y Tagle, Buenos Aires (H)	Yugoslavia	3–1	Friendly	Trujillo, Esponda (2)	—	
165	19 April 1931	Estadio de Puerto Sajonia, Asunción (A)	Paraguay	1–0	Friendly	Peucelle	—	
166	25 April 1931	Estadio de Puerto Sajonia, Asunción (A)	Paraguay	1–1	Friendly	Unknown	—	
167	4 July 1931	Estadio Sportivo Barracas, Buenos Aires (H)	Paraguay	1–1	Copa Rosa Chevallier Boutell	Monti	—	
168	9 July 1931	Estadio Sportivo Barracas, Buenos Aires (H)	Paraguay	3–1	Copa Rosa Chevallier Boutell	Castro (2), Spadaro	—	
169	15 May 1932	Estadio Sportivo Barracas, Buenos Aires (H)	Uruguay	2–0	Friendly	Martinez, Irurieta	—	
170	18 May 1932	Estadio Centenario, Montevideo (A)	Uruguay	0–1	Friendly		—	
171	27 May 1934	Stadio Littoriale, Bologna (N)	Sweden	2–3	1934 FIFA World Cup	Belis, Galateo	14,000	
172	6 January 1935	Estadio Nacional, Lima (N)	Chile	4–1	1935 South American Championship	Lauri, Arrieta, D. García, Masantonio	25,000	
173	20 January 1935	Estadio Nacional, Lima (N)	Peru	4–1	1935 South American Championship	Masantonio (3), D. García	21,000	
174	27 January 1935	Estadio Nacional, Lima (N)	Uruguay	0–3	1935 South American Championship		30,000	
175	18 July 1935	Estadio Centenario, Montevideo (A)	Uruguay	1–1	Copa Héctor Gómez	Peucelle	—	
176	15 August 1935	Estadio de Independiente, Avellaneda (H)	Uruguay	3–0	Copa Juan Mignaburu	Zozaya (2), D. García	—	
177	9 August 1936	Estadio de Independiente, Avellaneda (H)	Uruguay	1–0	Copa Juan Mignaburu	Zozaya	—	
178	20 September 1936	Estadio Centenario, Montevideo (A)	Uruguay	1–2	Copa Héctor Gómez	D. García	—	
179	30 December 1936	Estadio Gasómetro, Buenos Aires (N)	Chile	2–1	1937 South American Championship	Varallo (2)	35,000	
180	9 January 1937	Estadio Gasómetro, Buenos Aires (N)	Paraguay	6–1	1937 South American Championship	Scopelli (2), E. García, Zozaya (3)	42,000	
181	16 January 1937	Estadio Gasómetro, Buenos Aires (N)	Peru	1–0	1937 South American Championship	Zozaya	40,000	
182	23 January 1937	Estadio Gasómetro, Buenos Aires (N)	Uruguay	2–3	1937 South American Championship	Varallo, Zozaya	60,000	
183	30 January 1937	Estadio Gasómetro, Buenos Aires (N)	Brazil	1–0	1937 South American Championship	E. García	65,000	
184	1 February 1937	Estadio Gasómetro, Buenos Aires (N)	Brazil	2–0 (a.e.t.)	1937 South American Championship	De la Mata (2)	80,000	
185	10 October 1937	Estadio Centenario, Montevideo (A)	Uruguay	3–0	Copa Newton	J. Marvezi, Moreno, Fidel	—	
186	11 November 1937	Estadio de Independiente, Avellaneda (H)	Uruguay	5–1	Copa Lipton	Masantonio (3), Fidel, E. García	—	
187	18 June 1938	Estadio Alvear y Tagle, Buenos Aires (H)	Uruguay	1–0	Copa Juan Mignaburu	Moreno	—	
188	12 October 1938	Estadio Centenario, Montevideo (A)	Uruguay	3–2	Copa Héctor Gómez	E. García, Cosso, Cavadini	—	
189	15 January 1939	Estádio São Januário, Rio de Janeiro (A)	Brazil	5–1	Copa Julio Argentino Roca	E. García, Masantonio (2), Moreno (2)	—	
190	22 January 1939	Estádio São Januário, Rio de Janeiro (A)	Brazil	2–3	Copa Julio Argentino Roca	Rodolfi, E. García	—	
191	14 August 1939	Estadio de Puerto Sajonia, Asunción (A)	Paraguay	1–0	Copa Rosa Chevallier Boutell	Fabrini	—	
192	16 August 1939	Estadio de Puerto Sajonia, Asunción (A)	Paraguay	2–2	Copa Rosa Chevallier Boutell	Sarlanga, Arrieta	—	

Notes

1. Note 1: This list includes all matches organised by the Argentine Football Association as well as matches organised by the Argentine Amateur Football Association that are considered as full internationals by FIFA.
2. A: Abandoned after 79 minutes when the Paraguay squad left the field in protest against the award of a penalty to Argentina.
3. B: Uruguay were awarded the trophy as the visiting team.
4. C: Uruguay were awarded the trophy as the visiting team.
5. D: Match suspended after four minutes following a pitch invasion from supporters on 28 September 1924 and reorganised for 2 October. The re-match on 2 October was suspended after 86 minutes when Uruguay withdrew from the playing field.
6. E: The 1927 South American Championship doubled as qualifiers for the 1928 Summer Olympics.
7. F: Argentina were awarded the trophy as the visiting team.
8. G: Uruguay were awarded the trophy as the visiting team.
9. H: Uruguay were awarded the trophy as the visiting team.
10. I: Argentina were awarded the trophy as the visiting team.

== Record by opponent ==
Team	Pld	W	D	L	GF	GA	GD	WPCT
Belgium	1	1	0	0	6	3	+3	100.00
Bolivia	2	2	0	0	12	1	+11	100.00
Brazil	13	8	1	4	24	14	+10	61.54
Chile	8	6	2	0	18	5	+13	75.00
Egypt	1	1	0	0	6	0	+6	100.00
France	1	1	0	0	1	0	+1	100.00
Mexico	1	1	0	0	6	3	+3	100.00
Paraguay	25	15	7	3	55	25	+30	60.00
Peru	4	4	0	0	13	2	+11	100.00
Portugal	1	0	1	0	0	0	0	0.00
Sweden	1	0	0	1	2	3	−1	0.00
United States	2	2	0	0	17	3	+14	100.00
Uruguay	49	18	14	17	64	57	+7	36.73
Yugoslavia	1	1	0	0	3	1	+2	100.00
Total	110	60	25	25	227	117	+110	54.55

Source: Results
