= 1922 in Brazilian football =

Football in Brazil
- Season: 1922

The following article presents a summary of the 1922 football (soccer) season in Brazil, which was the 21st season of competitive football in the country.

== Campeonato Paulista ==
Final Stage

Position	Team	Points	Played	Won	Drawn	Lost	For	Against	Difference
1	Corinthians	30	18	14	2	2	72	19	53
2	Palestra Itália-SP	29	18	14	1	3	48	24	24
3	Sírio	26	18	11	4	3	44	27	17
4	Paulistano	22	18	10	2	6	51	34	17
5	AA das Palmeiras	18	18	7	4	7	37	29	8
6	Ypiranga-SP	15	18	5	5	8	32	34	−2
7	Minas Gerais	14	18	6	2	10	25	54	−29
8	AA São Bento	13	18	6	1	11	25	32	−7

Corinthians declared as the Campeonato Paulista champions.

== State championship champions ==
State	Champion	State	Champion
Amazonas	Nacional	Paraná	Britânia
Bahia	Botafogo-BA	Pernambuco	América-PE
Ceará	Ceará	Rio de Janeiro (DF)	América-RJ
Espírito Santo	América-ES	Rio Grande do Norte	América-RN
Maranhão	Fênix	Rio Grande do Sul	Grêmio
Minas Gerais	América-MG	São Paulo	Corinthians
Pará	Paysandu	Sergipe	Sergipe
Paraíba	Pytaguares		

== Other competition champions ==
Competition	Champion
Campeonato Brasileiro de Seleções Estaduais	São Paulo

== Brazil national team ==
The following table lists all the games played by the Brazil national football team in official competitions and friendly matches during 1922.

Date	Opposition	Result	Score	Brazil scorers	Competition
September 17, 1922	Chile	D	1–1	Tatu	South American Championship
September 24, 1922	Paraguay	D	1–1	Amílcar	South American Championship
October 1, 1922	Uruguay	D	0–0	–	South American Championship
October 15, 1922	Argentina	W	2–0	Neco, Amílcar	South American Championship
October 22, 1922	Argentina	W	2–1	Gambarotta (2)	Roca Cup
October 22, 1922	Paraguay	W	3–0	Neco, Formiga (2)	South American Championship
October 29, 1922	Paraguay	W	3–1	Imparatinho (2), Gambarotta	Taça Rodrigues Alves
