= 1919 in Argentine football =

Football in Argentina
- Season: 1919

Men's football
- Primera División: Boca Juniors
- Intermedia: Banfield (AFA); Barracas Central (AAm)
- Segunda División: El Porvenir (AFA); Sportivo Barracas III (Note: Reserve teams) (AAm)
- Tercera División: Almagro (AFA); Racing Club (AAm)
- Copa de Competencia: Boca Juniors
- Copa Ibarguren: Boca Juniors

1919 in Argentine football saw the "Asociación Argentina de Football" (AFA) league championship abandoned mid season. The clubs then split between two different associations. The majority of the clubs joined the new "Asociación Amateurs de Football" (AAm) while six clubs remained with the official body.

Boca Juniors won four titles that year, including the Primera División and three cups, domestic Copa de Competencia Jockey Club and Copa Ibarguren and the international Tie Cup. Meanwhile, Racing Club joined the dissident Asociación Amateurs and won it to achieve its 7th consecutive league championship.

== Primera División ==
=== Asociación Argentina de Football - Copa Campeonato ===
The 1919 season started on 16 March 1919 but the tournament was annulled due to internal problems. Therefore a new dissident Association was created and there were two tournaments disputed at the same time.

After the schism the Asociación Argentina organized a tournament with the few remaining teams, 6 in total. Boca Juniors was declared champion with 14 fixtures to be played.

Pos	Team	Pts	G	W	D	L	Gf	Ga	Gd
1	Boca Juniors	14	7	7	0	0	27	5	+22
2	Estudiantes (LP)	7	8	3	1	4	10	7	+3
3	Huracán	4	5	2	0	3	3	11	-8
4	Eureka	3	4	1	1	2	5	6	-1
5	Sportivo Almagro	3	4	1	1	2	3	8	-5
6	Porteño	3	6	1	1	4	5	16	-11

=== Asociación Amateurs de Football ===
Internal problems in the Association caused that some members left to create a new league: the Asociación Amateurs de Football, which organized its own championships. Racing Club joined the new rival association winning the tournament, its 7th consecutive league title.

Vélez Sársfield played its first Primera División championship after being disaffiliated from the Asociación Argentina.

Pos	Team	Pts	G	W	D	L	Gf	Ga	Gd
1	Racing Club	26	13	13	0	0	43	10	+33
2	Vélez Sársfield	20	13	9	2	2	21	8	+13
3	River Plate	16	13	6	4	3	16	11	+5
4	Defensores de Belgrano	16	13	6	4	3	20	18	+2
5	Atlanta	14	13	6	2	5	27	17	+10
6	San Lorenzo	13	13	5	3	5	22	20	+2
7	Gimnasia y Esgrima (LP)	13	13	6	1	6	18	19	-1
8	Independiente	12	13	5	2	6	22	20	+2
9	Platense	12	13	5	2	6	22	24	-2
10	Sportivo Barracas	12	13	5	2	6	20	23	-3
11	Estudiantil Porteño	11	13	4	3	6	19	21	-2
12	Tigre	9	13	4	1	8	17	23	-6
13	San Isidro	5	13	2	1	10	14	27	-13
14	Estudiantes (BA)	3	13	1	1	11	8	48	-40

== Lower divisions ==
=== Intermedia ===
- AFA Champion: Banfield
- AAm Champion: Barracas Central

=== Segunda División ===
- AFA Champion: El Porvenir
- AAm Champion: Sportivo Barracas III

== Domestic cups ==
=== Copa de Competencia Jockey Club ===
Champion: Boca Juniors

==== Final ====
1920

Boca Juniors	1-0 (aet)	Rosario Central
Calomino	Report

Buenos Aires

=== Copa Ibarguren ===
Champion: Boca Juniors

==== Final ====
8 February 1920

Boca Juniors	1-0	Rosario Central
Miranda	Report

Gimnasia y Esgrima (BA)

== International cups ==
=== Tie Cup ===
- Champion: (Argentina) Boca Juniors

==== Final ====
25 May 1920

Boca Juniors (Argentina)	2–0	(Uruguay) Nacional
	Report

Sportivo Barracas

=== Copa Aldao ===
- Champion: (Uruguay) Nacional

==== Final ====
16 May 1920

Nacional (Uruguay)	3–0	(Argentina) Boca Juniors
	Report

Montevideo

== Argentina national team ==
=== Copa América ===
Argentina travelled to Brazil to play in the 3rd edition of Copa América. They finished in 3rd place behind hosts Brazil and runners-up Uruguay.

=== Titles ===
- Copa Premier Honor Argentino 1919

=== Results ===
Date	Venue	Opponents	Score	Competition	Argentina scorers	Match Report(s)
11 May 1919	Asunción	Paraguay	1 - 5	Friendly
13 May 1919	Rio de Janeiro	Uruguay	3 - 2	Copa América 1919	Izaguirre, Varela og
15 May 1919	Asunción	Paraguay	0 - 3	Friendly
18 May 1919	Rio de Janeiro	Brazil	3 - 1	Copa América 1919	Izaguirre
20 May 1919	Asunción	Paraguay	1 - 2	Friendly
22 May 1919	Rio de Janeiro	Chile	1 - 4	Copa América 1919	Clarcke 3, Izaguirre
24 May 1919	Asunción	Paraguay	1 - 2	Friendly
1 June 1919	Rio de Janeiro	Brazil	3 - 3	Copa Roberto Cherry
18 July 1919	Montevideo	Uruguay	4 - 1	Copa Premier Honor Uruguayo
24 July 1919	Montevideo	Uruguay	2 - 1	Copa Newton
7 September 1919	Buenos Aires	Uruguay	1 - 2	Copa Lipton
19 October 1919	Buenos Aires	Uruguay	6 - 1	Copa Premier Honor Argentino
7 December 1919	Montevideo	Uruguay	4 - 2	Copa Círculo de la Prensa
