= Tuffy Neugen =

Brazilian footballer

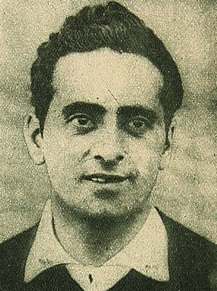

Personal information
- Date of birth: 6 June 1899
- Place of birth: Santos, São Paulo, Brazil
- Date of death: 4 December 1935 (aged 36)
- Position: Goalkeeper

Senior career*
Years	Team	Apps	(Gls)
1917–1919	AA das Palmeiras		
1919	América-PE		
1919–1920	Pelotas		
1920	Santos		
1921–1926	Syrio		
1925	→ Palestra Itália (loan)		
1927	Santos		
1928–1931	Corinthians		

International career
1925	Brazil	3	(0)
- * Club domestic league appearances and goals

Tuffy Neugen (6 June 1899 – 4 December 1935) was a Brazilian footballer. He played in two matches for the Brazil national football team in 1925. He was also part of Brazil's squad for the 1925 South American Championship.

== Career ==
Tuffy began his career at AA das Palmeiras at the age of 17. In the decisive matches of the 1918 state championship, which took place in January 1919, Palmeiras were fighting for the title along with Corinthians and Paulistano. In the penultimate match, they'd face Corinthians and had to win to maintain their chances of winning the title, but Corinthians won that match by 5x3. After the game, Tuffy was accused of throwing the match, as a result of which he was expelled from the club. The goalkeeper left the state, moving to Pernambuco, where he joined América, winning that year's state championship with them.

He then played for Pelotas. In 1920, Tuffy moved to Santos, where he made his debut on 4 April in a match against Ypiranga, but played only six friendly games for the club. In 1921, he went to Syrio. In March 1925, Tuffy was loaned to Palestra Itália for a tour of Argentina and Uruguay. There he played two matches against the Uruguay and Argentina national teams, where he conceded only one goal. In 1927, the footballer returned to Santos, playing in 19 matches. In total, the goalkeeper played 25 matches for the club.

On November 13, 1927, the final of the Brazilian State Teams Championship was played between the teams of São Paulo and Distrito Federal. The São Paulo team was composed largely of Santos players. With the score tied at 1x1, the referee awarded a penalty to Distrito Federal. A brawl followed, after which the game could not continue: the São Paulo players surrounded the referee, demanding that the decision be overturned. The President of Brazil, Washington Luís, who was attending the match, ordered the game to be resumed. However, the Paulista players refused rudely, after which they left the field, despite the requests of many officials, including the head of their delegation, Antônio Guilherme Gonçalves. The Distrito Federal team scored a goal into an empty net and became the winner. Gonçalves not only served as the head of the delegation, but also as the president of the APEA and the president of Santos. Following a meeting of the club's officials, he decided to exclude from the team the two main instigators of the incident, Feitiço and Tuffy. Feitiço returned to the Santos squad in July of the following year, but Tuffy would never play another match for the team.

In 1928, Tuffy moved to Corinthians, where he made his debut on July 22 in a match against América, where he conceded two goals. That same year, he became the champion of the state of São Paulo with the club, and then repeated this achievement twice in a row. During that period, he would be part of a legendary defensive trio that also featured defenders Armando Del Debbio and Pedro Grané, who together were nicknamed "The Holy Trinity" and "The Three Musketeers". In total, the footballer played 71 matches for the club (48 wins, 11 draws and 12 losses). Tuffy's last match for Corinthians was against Santos on May 17, 1931, in which he conceded 3 goals. After this, the goalkeeper ended his playing career.

In 1931, Tuffy, through an article in A Gazeta, appealed to the public to raise money for the seriously ill footballer Tatu, who played for Portuguesa. In the article, he asked for 10,000 réis to be collected for treatment for tuberculosis. A large sum was collected, but it was of no help: Tatu died before the end of the fundraising campaign. That same year, he starred in the feature film Campeão de Futebol (The Football Champion), the first film in Brazilian cinema to have football as its main theme. Other Brazilian players who starred alongside him included Arthur Friedenreich, Formiga, and Ministrinho.

After finishing his career, Tuffy went into business: he opened a cinema in the center of São Paulo called Santa Helena, or according to another version, Penha Teatro. Tuffy died on December 4, 1935 from double pneumonia. According to his last will, the goalkeeper was buried with his goalkeeper uniform, which he wore for Corinthians.
