= Óscar González (Chilean footballer) =

Chilean footballer (1894–1959)

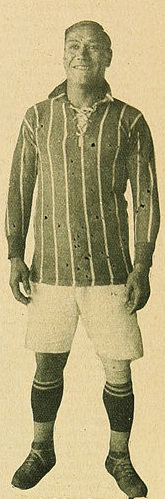
- González in 1926

Personal information
- Full name: Óscar del Tránsito González Figueroa
- Date of birth: 24 August 1894
- Place of birth: Coquimbo, Chile
- Date of death: 10 June 1959 (aged 64)
- Position: Midfielder

Senior career*
Years	Team	Apps	(Gls)
1917–1918	Liverpool Wanderers		
1919–1920	The Comercial		
1921–1926	La Cruz		
1926	Green Cross		
1927–1932	Colo-Colo		
1933	Morning Star		
1934–1935	Colo-Colo		

International career
1919–1926	Chile	12	(0)
- * Club domestic league appearances and goals

Óscar del Tránsito González Figueroa (24 August 1894 – 10 June 1959), known as Colo-Colo González, was a Chilean footballer who played as a midfielder.

== International career ==
González made twelve appearances for Chile, playing at three South American Championships: 1919, 1922 and 1926.

== Honours ==
Colo-Colo

- Liga Central de Football de Santiago: 1928, 1929
- División de Honor de la Asociación de Football de Santiago: 1930
