= 1916 Campeonato Paulista =

In the 1916 season of the Campeonato Paulista, two championships were played, each by a different league.

== APSA Championship ==
Campeonato Paulista
- Season: 1916
- Champions: Paulistano
- Matches: 41
- Goals: 171 (4.17 per match)
- Top goalscorer: Mariano (Paulistano) – 8 goals
- Biggest home win: Paulistano 9-0 São Bento (November 19, 1916)
- Biggest away win: Santos 1-5 Mackenzie (November 19, 1916)
- Highest scoring: Paulistano 9-0 São Bento (November 19, 1916)

Before the start of the championship, Scottish Wanderers was expelled from the league after it became known that the club players who studied at Mackenzie College had shared the club's income, which was understood by the APSA as professionalism, which was forbidden by the league. The team was replaced by new entrants Palestra Itália and Santos. At the end of the championship, Paulistano won the title for the 4th time. the top scorer was Paulistano's Mariano with 8 goals.

=== System ===
The championship was disputed in a double-round robin system, with the team with the most points winning the title.

=== Championship ===
Pos	Team	Pld	W	D	L	GF	GA	GD	Pts	Qualification or relegation
1	Paulistano	12	9	1	2	40	17	+23	19	Champions
2	São Bento	11	6	2	3	26	27	−1	14 (Note: The second match between Santos and São Bento wasn't held)	
3	Mackenzie	12	6	1	5	27	23	+4	13	
4	Ypiranga	12	6	1	5	19	19	0	13	
5	Santos	11	4	1	6	23	31	−8	9	
6	AA das Palmeiras	12	4	0	8	20	28	−8	8	
7	Palestra Itália	12	2	2	8	16	26	−10	6	

Updated to match(es) played on December 17, 1916. Source: RSSSF.com
Rules for classification: 1) points; 2) goal difference; 3) wins; 4) head-to-head points.

== LPF Championship ==
Campeonato Paulista
- Season: 1916
- Champions: Corinthians
- Matches: 52
- Goals: 130 (2.5 per match)
- Top goalscorer: Apparício (Corinthians) – 7 goals
- Biggest home win: Corinthians 8-0 Antarctica (May 3, 1916)
- Biggest away win: Minas Gerais 0-3 Campos Elyseos (June 13, 1916); Vicentino 0-3 Campos Elyseos (December 12, 1916)
- Highest scoring: Corinthians 8-0 Antarctica (May 3, 1916)

Corinthians returned to the LPF that year, after a disastrous passage through APSA, which imposed a number of restrictions on it, among them, forbidding it from disputing the championship, forcing it to loan some of its players to teams that were disputing the championship, and allowing it to play friendlies only against fellow APSA members (friendlies that were often purposefully delayed or cancelled). The situation threw the club into a financial crisis, and the team resorted to playing friendlies in nearby cities, such as Campinas and Jundiaí to raise funds. The edition of the 1916 Campeonato Paulista organized by the LPF (Liga Paulista de Football) would be the biggest to date, with fourteen teams. However, the championship was fraught with disorganization, and by December, the league had folded with many matches yet to be played. Corinthians, unbeaten at the time of the league's folding, were declared champions, winning the title for the 2nd time. the top scorer was Corinthians's Apparício with 7 goals.

=== System ===
The championship was disputed in a single-round robin system, with the team with the most points winning the title.

=== Championship ===
==== Preliminary ====
3 May 1916

Corinthians	8 – 0	Antarctica
Peres 1T'; Amílcar 1T'; Neco 1T' 2T'; Dias 1T' 2T' 2T'; Américo Fiaschi 2T'	Report

Parque da Antarctica Paulista, São Paulo

Corinthians qualifies for the Campeonato Paulista

==== League ====
Pos	Team	Pld	W	D	L	GF	GA	GD	Pts	Qualification or relegation
1	Corinthians	8	8	0	0	23	3	+20	16	Champions
2	União Lapa	9	6	0	3	16	19	−3	12	
3	Alumny	8	4	2	2	7	11	−4	10	
4	Campos Elyseos	8	3	3	2	12	6	+6	9	
5	Americano	6	3	2	1	17	3	+14	8	
6	Ítalo	7	3	1	3	8	8	0	7	
7	Maranhão	7	3	1	3	6	7	−1	7	
8	Minas Gerais	7	2	3	2	6	8	−2	7	
9	Payssandu	9	2	3	4	4	9	−5	7	
10	Ruggerone	12	2	1	9	5	9	−4	5	
11	Vicentino	8	2	1	5	7	13	−6	5	
12	Luzitano	7	2	1	4	4	10	−6	5	
13	Internacional	4	2	0	2	6	6	0	4	Withdrew
14	Germânia	2	0	0	2	1	7	−6	0	Withdrew

Updated to match(es) played on November 26, 1916. Source: RSSSF.com
Rules for classification: 1) points; 2) goal difference; 3) wins; 4) head-to-head points.
