= Copa Rodrigues Alves =

- Organiser(s): (Brazil) CBD (Paraguay) APF
- Founded: 1922
- Abolished: 1923; 103 years ago
- Region: South America
- Teams: 2
- Related competitions: Taça Oswaldo Cruz
- Last champions: Brazil
- Most championships: Brazil (2 titles)

The Copa Rodrigues Alves (English: Rodrigues Alves Cup), was a friendly association football competition realized between Brazil and Paraguay, contested in the years of 1922 and 1923. The trophy name is in honor of Francisco de Paula Rodrigues Alves, former Brazilian president.

The first edition was held after the 1922 South American Championship, based in Brazil, and the second edition was held during the 1923 South American Championship, based in Uruguay.

== Results ==
Ed.	Year	Champion	Runners-up
1	1922	Brazil	Paraguay
2	1923	Brazil	Paraguay

== Matches ==
=== 1922 ===
October 29

Brazil	3–1	Paraguay
Imparatinho; Gambarotta	Report	Fretes

Chácara da Floresta, São Paulo
Referee: Francisco Baldo (PAR)

=== 1923 ===
November 22

Brazil	3–1	Paraguay
Zezé; Nilo	Report

Parque Central, Montevideo
Referee: Angelo Minoli (URU)

== See also ==
- Taça Oswaldo Cruz
