= Antonio de Miguel =

Antonio de Miguel may refer to:

- Antonio de Miguel (footballer, born 1896) (1896–1936), Spanish football forward
- Antonio de Miguel (footballer, born 1899) (1899–unknown), Argentine football forward
