= Junqueira (footballer, born 1900) =

Brazilian footballer (1900–1959)

Personal information
- Full name: Durval Junqueira Machado
- Date of birth: 12 June 1900
- Place of birth: Uberaba, Minas Gerais, Brazil
- Date of death: 12 April 1959 (aged 58)
- Place of death: São Paulo, Brazil
- Position: Forward

Senior career*
Years	Team	Apps	(Gls)
1918–1919	Uberaba		
1919–1925	Flamengo	101	(82)
1925	Paulistano		

International career
1920–1922	Brazil	4	(0)
- * Club domestic league appearances and goals

Durval Junqueira Machado (12 June 1900 – 12 April 1959) was a Brazilian footballer who played as a forward. He made four appearances for the Brazil national team from 1920 to 1922. He was also part of Brazil's squad for the 1920 and 1922 South American Championship.

At the club level, Junqueira played for Uberaba SC, CR Flamengo, and CA Paulistano, participating in the club's tour for Europe. He ended his career after enrolling in medical school and spent most of his life in Orlândia, São Paulo.

== Honours ==
Flamengo

- Campeonato Carioca: 1920, 1921

Brazil

- South American Championship: 1922
