= Stagnaro =

Stagnaro is a surname of Italian origin which means "pewterer." Notable people with the surname include:

- Andrés Stagnaro (born 1907), Argentine footballer
- Bruno Stagnaro (born 1973), Argentine film and television director, producer and screenplay writer
- Guido Stagnaro (1925–2021), Italian film director
- Ramón Stagnaro, Peruvian guitarist
- Raúl Castro Stagnaro, Peruvian politician
