= 1922 Campeonato Gaúcho =

Campeonato Gaúcho
- Season: 1922
- Champions: Grêmio (2nd title)
- Matches played: 8
- Goals scored: 25 (3.13 per match)

The 1922 Campeonato Gaúcho was the fourth season of Rio Grande do Sul's top association football league. Grêmio won their second title. This was the last season played before the Federalist Revolution suspended play until 1925.

== Format ==
The championship was contested by the four regional champions in a single round-robin system, with the team with the most points winning the title. If two teams finished with the same number of points, a tie-breaking match would be played.

== Qualified teams ==
Club	Location	Qualification method	Titles
Grêmio	Porto Alegre	Champions of the Center Region	1
Bagé	Bagé	Champions of the South Region	0
Guarani	Alegrete	Champions of the Frontier Region	0
Guarany	Cruz Alta	Champions of the Highlands Region	0

- Ideal were eliminated in the South Region Championship.
- FC Montenegro were eliminated in the Center Region Championship.
- 14 de Julho from Passo Fundo were eliminated in the Highlands Region Championship.

== Championship ==
Pos	Team	Pld	W	D	L	GF	GA	GD	Pts	Qualification
1	Grêmio (C)	3	2	0	1	5	2	+3	4	Tie-breaking match
2	Guarani de Alegrete	3	2	0	1	6	5	+1	4	Tie-breaking match
3	Guarany de Cruz Alta	3	1	0	2	5	7	−2	2	
4	Bagé	3	1	0	2	2	4	−2	2	

(C) Champions
15 November 1922

Grêmio	1–2	Guarani de Alegrete

15 November 1922

Bagé	2–1	Guarany de Cruz Alta

19 November 1922

Grêmio	2–0	Bagé

19 November 1922

Guarani de Alegrete	3–4	Guarany de Cruz Alta

23 November 1922

Grêmio	2–0	Guarany de Cruz Alta

23 November 1922

Bagé	0–1	Guarani de Alegrete

=== Tie-breaking matches ===
26 November 1922

Grêmio	2–2	Guarani de Alegrete

28 November 1922

Grêmio	2–1	Guarani de Alegrete
Ramão; Lagarto		Alexandre
