= José Apparício =

Brazilian footballer

Apparício
Personal information
- Full name: José Apparício Delgado
- Date of birth: 1894
- Place of birth: São Paulo, Brazil
- Date of death: 9 September 1943 (aged 48–49)
- Place of death: São Paulo, Brazil
- Position: Midfielder

Senior career*
| Years | Team | Apps | (Gls) |
| –1913 | Botafogo (Bom Retiro) | | |
| 1914–1918 | Corinthians | 47 | (22) |
- * Club domestic league appearances and goals

José Apparício Delgado (1894 – 9 September 1943), was a Brazilian professional footballer who played as a midfielder.

== Career ==
José Apparício arrived at Corinthians in 1914, and was therefore part of the club's first two state victories, in 1914 and 1916, being top scorer on the second occasion. He also defended the São Paulo team.

== Personal life ==
His brother, Raphael Apparício also played for the club during this period (1917–1921).

== Honours ==
Corinthians

- Campeonato Paulista: 1914, 1916 (LPF)

Individual

- 1916 Campeonato Paulista top scorer: 7 goals (LPF)
