= Prêmio Belfort Duarte =

Brazilian football award

The Prêmio Belfort Duarte was a football award given by the Brazilian National Sports Council to the football player who completes ten years without being booked with a red card. Starting in 1995, the award was given by the CBF, and since 2008 the award is given by Rede Globo. It is named after Belfort Duarte because in a game he mentioned to the referee that he committed a foul in his club's penalty area.

== History ==
The award was created on August 16, 1945, by the now defunct Brazilian National Sports Council, and instituted on January 1, 1946, and it is given to the amateur or professional footballers who completed at least two hundred games in at least a ten-year career without being booked with a red card. Those players were awarded with a certificate, a medal and a card granting free entrance to every stadium in Brazil. After being deactivated for a few years, the award was given again, starting on May 18, 1995, by the CBF. However, the organization only granted the award to retired players. This measure aimed to prevent situations like of the full back Everaldo (world champion with the Brazilian team in 1970), who three months after winning the award punched a referee and was suspended for a year.

== Rede Globo ==
Since 2008, the Prêmio Belfort Duarte is given by Rede Globo, awarding the player with the cleanest disciplinary record during the Campeonato Brasileiro Série A. The 2008 winner was Ricardinho, who committed seven fouls in the 25 games he played for Vitória.

=== Winners ===
Year	Player	Club	Fouls	Yellow Cards	Red Cards	Games
2008	Ricardinho	Vitória	7	0	0	25
