= Urdinarán =

Urdinarán is a Basque surname. Notable people with the name include:

- Antonio Urdinarán (1898–1961), Uruguayan footballer
- Santos Urdinarán (1900–1979), Uruguayan footballer
