= 1925 Campeonato Gaúcho =

Campeonato Gaúcho
- Season: 1925
- Champions: Bagé (1st title)
- Matches: 4
- Goals: 11 (2.75 per match)

The 1925 Campeonato Gaúcho was the fifth season of Rio Grande do Sul's top association football league. Bagé won their first title. This season is the first since 1922, as play was suspended due to the Federalist Revolution.

== Format ==
The championship changed its format for the 1925 season. Nine region championships were contested, whose champions would play zonal finals, determining the five teams qualified to the state championship which was contested in a single-elimination basis.

== Qualified teams ==
Club	Location	Qualification method	Titles
Bagé	Bagé	Champions of the South Zone	0
Grêmio	Porto Alegre	Champions of the Metropolitan Zone	2
Grêmio Santanense	Santana do Livramento	Champions of the Frontier Zone	0
Guarany	Cruz Alta	Champions of the Highlands Zone	0
Juventude	Caxias do Sul	Champions of the Northwest Zone	0

The following teams were eliminated in the regional rounds: 14 de Julho, 15 de Novembro (Dom Pedrito), Bataclan, Carlos Barbosa, General Osório, Grêmio Santanense, Guarani de Alegrete, Guarany de Cachoeira do Sul, Novo Hamburgo, Pelotas and Taquarense.

== Championship ==
=== First round ===
15 November 1925

Guarany (CA)	2–1	Juventude

=== Semifinals ===
15 November 1925

Bagé	3–1	Grêmio Santanense

19 November 1925

Grêmio	1–0	Guarany (CA)

=== Final ===
22 November 1925

Grêmio	1–2	Bagé
Feio		Oliveira
