= Xingó (footballer) =

Brazilian footballer

Personal information
- Full name: Pedro Salvador
- Date of birth: 14 September 1900
- Place of birth: São Paulo, Brazil

International career
Years	Team	Apps	(Gls)
1922	Brazil	1	(0)

Pedro Salvador (born 14 September 1900, date of death unknown), better known as Xingó, was a Brazilian footballer. He played in one match for the Brazil national football team in 1922. He was also part of Brazil's squad for the 1922 South American Championship.
