= Ernesto Celli =

Argentine footballer

Personal information
- Date of birth: 1895
- Date of death: 1925 (aged 29–30)
- Position: Midfielder

International career
Years	Team	Apps	(Gls)
1919–1924	Argentina	6	(1)

Ernesto Celli (1895 – 1925) was an Argentine footballer. He played in six matches for the Argentina national football team from 1919 to 1924. He was also part of Argentina's squad for the 1922 South American Championship.
