= Maurizio Pugliesi =

Italian footballer

Personal information
- Date of birth: 27 December 1976 (age 49)
- Place of birth: Capannoli, Italy
- Height: 1.88 m (6 ft 2 in)
- Position: Goalkeeper

Team information
- Current team: Pisa (goalkeeping coach)

Senior career*
| Years | Team | Apps | (Gls) |
| 1994–2000 | Pontedera | 90 | (0) |
| 2000–2001 | Montevarchi | 3 | (0) |
| 2001–2004 | Pescara | 16 | (0) |
| 2001–2002 | → Poggibonsi (loan) | 28 | (0) |
| 2002–2003 | → Grosseto (loan) | 34 | (0) |
| 2004–2010 | Rimini | 85 | (0) |
| 2010–2014 | Pisa | 47 | (0) |
| 2014–2017 | Empoli | 1 | (0) |

Managerial career
- 2017–2020: Empoli U-19 (goalkeeping coach)
- 2020–: Pisa (goalkeeping coach)
- * Club domestic league appearances and goals

Maurizio Pugliesi (born 27 December 1976) is an Italian former footballer who played as a goalkeeper.

Pugliesi made his Serie A debut on 15 May 2016 against Torino at the age of 39 making, him the oldest debutant in the Italian top flight, beating the record set by Amílcar Barbuy in 1931. In 2025, Luka Modrić surpassed Pugliesi's record.

== Coaching career ==
After finishing his playing career at the end of the 2016-17 season, Pugliesi was immediately hired as goalkeeping coach for Empoli's Primavera/U19 team. He worked in this position until July 2020, before joining Serie B club Pisa SC as goalkeeper coach in August 2020.
