= 1916 in Brazilian football =

Football in Brazil
- Season: 1916

The following article presents a summary of the 1916 football (soccer) season in Brazil, which was the 15th season of competitive football in the country.

== Campeonato Paulista ==
In 1916 there were two different editions of the Campeonato Paulista. One was organized by the Associação Paulista de Esportes Atléticos (APEA) while the other one was organized by the Liga Paulista de Foot-Ball (LPF).

=== APEA's Campeonato Paulista ===
Final Standings

Position	Team	Points	Played	Won	Drawn	Lost	For	Against	Difference
1	Paulistano	19	12	9	1	2	40	17	23
2	AA São Bento	14	11	6	2	3	26	27	−1
3	Mackenzie	13	12	6	1	5	27	23	4
4	Ypiranga-SP	13	12	6	1	5	19	19	0
5	Santos	9	11	4	1	6	23	31	−8
6	AA das Palmeiras	6	12	4	0	8	20	28	−8
7	Palestra Itália-SP	8	12	2	2	8	16	26	−10

Paulistano declared as the APEA's Campeonato Paulista champions.

=== LPF's Campeonato Paulista ===
Final Standings

Position	Team	Points	Played	Won	Drawn	Lost	For	Against	Difference
1	Corinthians	16	8	8	0	0	20	3	17
2	União Lapa	10	8	5	0	3	14	18	−4
3	Alumni	10	7	4	2	1	6	8	−2
4	Campos Elíseos	9	8	3	3	2	12	6	6
5	Maranhão	7	7	3	1	3	6	7	−1
6	Minas Gerais	7	7	2	3	2	6	8	−2
7	Payssandu-SP	7	9	2	3	4	4	9	−5
8	Americano-SP	6	5	2	2	1	13	3	10
9	Ítalo	5	6	2	1	3	5	8	−3
10	Vicentino	5	7	2	1	4	7	11	−4
11	SC Luzitano	5	7	2	1	4	4	10	−6
12	Ruggerone	3	11	1	1	9	2	8	−6
13	SC Internacional de São Paulo	–	–	–	–	–	–	–	–
13	Germânia	–	–	–	–	–	–	–	–

SC Internacional de São Paulo and Germânia matches were canceled, as both clubs abandoned the competition.

The LPF's Campeonato Paulista was not concluded as APEA's and LPF's competitions fused, and Corinthians declared as the LPF's Campeonato Paulista champions.

== State championship champions ==
State	Champion
Amazonas	Nacional
Bahia	República
Minas Gerais	América-MG
Paraná	Coritiba
Pernambuco	Sport Recife
Rio de Janeiro (DF)	América-RJ
São Paulo	Paulistano (by APEA); Corinthians (by LPF)

== Brazil national team ==
The following table lists all the games played by the Brazil national football team in official competitions and friendly matches during 1916.

Date	Opposition	Result	Score	Brazil scorers	Competition
July 8, 1916	Chile	D	1–1	Demóstenes	South American Championship
July 10, 1916	Argentina	D	1–1	Alencar	South American Championship
July 12, 1916	Uruguay	L	1–2	Friedenreich	South American Championship
July 18, 1916	Uruguay	W	1–0	Mimi Sodré	International Friendly
