= Belfort Duarte =

Brazilian footballer and manager (1883–1918)

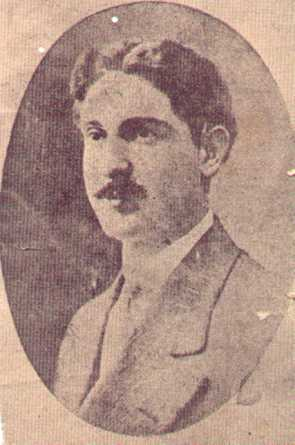

Personal information
- Full name: João Evangelista Belfort Duarte
- Date of birth: 27 November 1883
- Place of birth: São Luís, Empire of Brazil
- Date of death: 27 November 1918 (aged 35)
- Place of death: Campo Belo, United States of Brazil
- Position: Central defender

Senior career*
Years	Team	Apps	(Gls)
1902–1905	Mackenzie College		
1906–1915	America-RJ		

Managerial career
- 1916: America-RJ
- * Club domestic league appearances and goals

João Evangelista Belfort Duarte, commonly known as Belfort Duarte (27 November 1883 – 27 November 1918), was a Brazilian football central defender. The Belfort Duarte Award is named after him.

== Playing career ==
Born in São Luís, Maranhão state, he started his career in 1902, with Mackenzie College, where he translated the football rules to Portuguese. He was also one of the club's founders. Belfort Duarte worked for Light & Power company in 1906. He joined America-RJ in 1906, changing the club's colors from black to red in 1908. With America, he won the Campeonato Carioca in 1913. Belfort Duarte played his last game in 1915, against Flamengo.

== Coaching career ==
After his retirement, he started a coaching career, managing America in 1916, winning the state championship in that year.

== Death ==
Belfort Duarte was murdered on his birthday, 27 November 1918, in a favela located in Campo Belo, Minas Gerais state, when he was trying to hide from the Spanish flu.

== Legacy ==
The Belfort Duarte Award was instituted in 1946, by the Brazilian National Sports Council, after Belfort Duarte. The award is given to the football player who completes ten years without being booked with a red card. This award was named after Belfort Duarte because in a game he mentioned to the referee that he committed a foul in his club's penalty area.
