= René Borjas =

Uruguayan footballer (1897-1931)

Reneé Borjas
Personal information
- Date of birth: 23 December 1897
- Place of birth: Minas, Uruguay
- Date of death: 16 December 1931 (aged 33)
- Position: Forward

Senior career*
Years	Team	Apps	(Gls)
- Montevideo Wanderers
- Nacional
- Montevideo Wanderers

International career
1926–1928	Uruguay	5	(2)
Medal record
Men's football
Representing Uruguay
Olympic Games
Gold medal – first place	1928 Amsterdam	Team
South American Championship
Winner	1926 Chile
- * Club domestic league appearances and goals

Reneé Borjas (23 December 1897 – 16 December 1931) was a Uruguayan footballer who played as a forward. He was member of Uruguay national team which won gold medal at 1928 Olympics.

== Career statistics ==
=== International ===
National team	Year	Apps	Goals
Uruguay	1926	2	2
Uruguay	1927	1	0
Uruguay	1928	2	0
Total		5	2
