= Roberto Chery =

Uruguayan footballer (1896-1919)

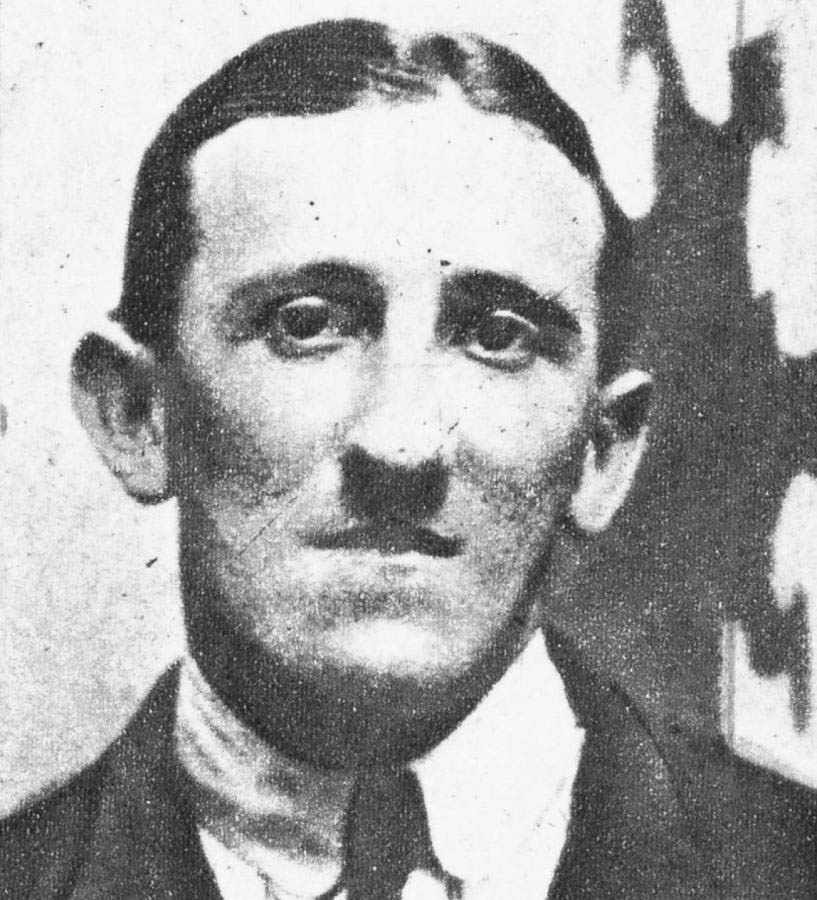

Personal information
- Date of birth: 16 February 1896
- Place of birth: Montevideo, Uruguay
- Date of death: 30 May 1919 (aged 23)
- Place of death: Rio de Janeiro, Brazil
- Position: Goalkeeper

Senior career*
Years	Team	Apps	(Gls)
1916–1919	Peñarol	31	(0)

International career
1919	Uruguay	1	(0)
- * Club domestic league appearances and goals as of March 2020

Roberto Chery (16 February 1896 – 30 May 1919) was a Uruguayan football goalkeeper who played during the days of amateur sport in the Uruguayan Primera División (1900–1931).

Chery made his club career entirely at Peñarol, where he had successfully passed a test with his two best friends and then also international footballers, Isabelino Gradín and Antonio Campolo.

== Summary ==
Chery suffered a serious hernia injury while playing for Uruguay against Chile in the 1919 South American Championship. It was his debut (and subsequently his only game) with the national team after coach Severino Castillo decided he would replace Cayetano Saporiti. Although he suffered a severe pain after making a save during the match, Chery was not replaced and continue playing the match. 13 days after the injury, Chery was operated at Casa do Sáude in Brazil but he did not survive the surgery and died at 19:40.

The cause of death was a hernia which complicated after the physically demanding match he played for Uruguay. Chery's body was embalmed and then transported in ship to Montevideo, where he was buried at Cementerio del Buceo.

== Aftermath ==
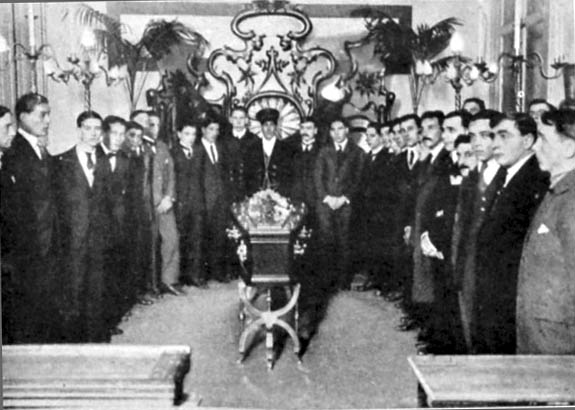
Funeral of Chery in Rio de Janeiro

Brazil and Uruguay teams had scheduled a friendly match (Copa Rio Branco) for 19 June 1919. Due to the Uruguayan side declined to participate because of Chery's tragic death, Argentina offered to replace the Uruguayan side.

After the Brazilian Federation accepted, the match (now named "Copa Roberto Chery" to honor the goalkeeper) was finally played. Argentina entered to the field wearing Uruguay's traditional light-blue jersey while Brazil wore the Peñarol jersey.

All incomes from ticket sales were donated to Chery's family, while the trophy was given to Club Peñarol after an agreement between both captains.
