= Julio Ramírez (Paraguayan footballer) =

Paraguayan footballer

Personal information
- Position: Forward

Senior career*
Years	Team	Apps	(Gls)
- Club Nacional

International career
1922–1925	Paraguay	5	(0)
Medal record
Silver medal – second place	Brazil 1922
Bronze medal – third place	Argentina 1925
- * Club domestic league appearances and goals

Julio Ramírez was a Paraguayan footballer who played as a forward.

As a player for Club Nacional, he took part in the 1922 South American Championship, where Paraguay finished as runners-up. Ramírez played in two matches, against Brazil and Chile, scoring one goal against Chile.

He later participated in the 1925 South American Championship, where Paraguay finished third and last. Ramírez appeared in all three of Paraguay's matches: two against Brazil and one against Argentina.

== Bibliography ==
- Tomasz Wołek, Encyklopedia piłkarska FUJI. Copa America, GiA Publishing, Katowice, 1995, ISBN 83-902751-2-0, pp. 24–25, 39.
