= Formiga (footballer, born 1895) =

Brazilian footballer

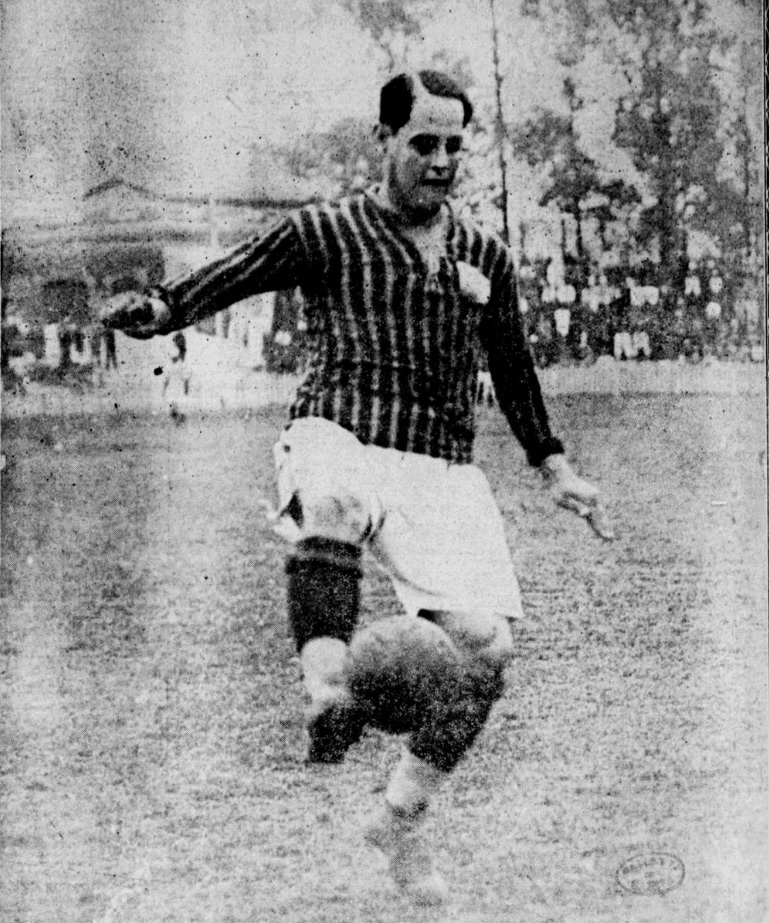
- Xavier Camargo, representing São Paulo team in a game against the Rio de Janeiro team, November 11, 1929

Personal information
- Full name: Afrodísio Xavier Camargo
- Date of birth: 9 March 1895
- Place of birth: São Paulo, Brazil
- Date of death: 30 July 1974 (aged 79)
- Place of death: São Paulo, Brazil
- Height: 1.79 m (5 ft 10 in)
- Position: Forward

Senior career*
Years	Team	Apps	(Gls)
1912-1917	Ypiranga		
1918	Palestra Italia		
1919-1920	Ypiranga		
1921-1923	Paulistano	1	(0)
1923	Flamengo		
1924-1929	Paulistano		
1930	São Paulo		(1)

International career
1922	Brazil	8	(2)
- * Club domestic league appearances and goals

Afrodísio Xavier Camargo (9 March 1895 – 30 July 1974), known as Formiga, was a Brazilian footballer. He played in five matches for the Brazil national football team in 1922. He was also part of Brazil's squad for the 1922 South American Championship.

== Career ==
Formiga was born on March 9, 1895, in São Paulo. He started his football career at Paulistano's youth team. After a disagreement with the club's board, he went to play for Ypiranga, where he made his debut in 1912.

He participated in 1919 South American Championship as a reserve, where Brazil would win their first Copa América. He did not play in any match.

In 1921, Formiga played for Paulistano, and won the Paulista Championship that year.

A year later Formiga participated in the 1922 South American Championship, where Brazil would win their second Copa América. He played 5 matches, against Chile, Paraguay, Uruguay, Argentina in Round-robin tournament, and again against Paraguay in the tournament finale as Brazil and Paraguay finished tied for first place along with Uruguay. However, Uruguay left the competition as a protest against the arbitration of the Brazilian Pedro Santos in his match against Paraguay. In said finale he would score 2 goals (the only 2 goals he scored), said annotations would earn him the nickname of Viceroy of the Scorers.

With Paulistano Formiga went on to win the 1926, 1927 and 1929 Paulista Championships.

He died on July 30, 1974, in São Paulo at the side of his family.
