= 1926 South American Championship =

Football tournament

Tournament details
- Host country: Chile
- Dates: 12 October – 3 November 1926
- Teams: 5
- Venue(s): Estadio Sport de Ñuñoa, Santiago

Final positions
- Champions: Uruguay (6th title)
- Runners-up: Argentina
- Third place: Chile
- Fourth place: Paraguay

Tournament statistics
- Matches played: 10
- Goals scored: 55 (5.5 per match)
- Top scorer: (Chile) David Arellano (7 goals)

The 1926 South American Championship (Spanish: Campeonato Sudamericano 1926) was the 10th international association football championship for members of the Confederación Sudamericana de Fútbol (CONMEBOL). Hosted by Chile, the competition ran from 12 October – 3 November 1926 and was contested by the national teams of Argentina, Bolivia, Chile, Paraguay and Uruguay.

In the penultimate round of matches of the round-robin tournament, Uruguay were crowned champions for the sixth time after defeating Paraguay 6–1 in their final match.

== Background ==
In 1910, the Asociación del Fútbol Argentino (AFA) organised a tournament to mark the 100th anniversary of the May Revolution. The Copa Centenario Revolución de Mayo was contested by the national teams of Argentina, Chile and Uruguay and is considered to be a precursor to the South American Championship. Six years later, the AFA organised a second tournament, this time to celebrate the centenary of the Argentine Declaration of Independence. Alongside the three who had contested the Copa Centenario Revolución de Mayo, Brazil were invited to compete and the South American Championship was born. During the competition, the four associations of the competing teams met on 9 July 1916 and founded the Confederación Sudamericana de Fútbol (CONMEBOL).

Argentina were the defending champions having won the 1925 edition after drawing with Brazil in the final match of the competition. Uruguay were the most successful team in the history of the competition having won the five of the first nine editions.

Brazil withdrew prior to the start of the competition so only five of the six CONMEBOL members would compete.

== Format ==
The tournament was played as a round-robin where each team would play all of the others once. The winner would be decided by the total number of points obtained across all matches played.

=== Participants ===
- Argentina
- Bolivia
- Chile
- Paraguay
- Uruguay

== Venue ==
All matches were held at the Estadio Sport de Ñuñoa in Santiago.

Santiago
Estadio Sport de Ñuñoa
Capacity: 20,000
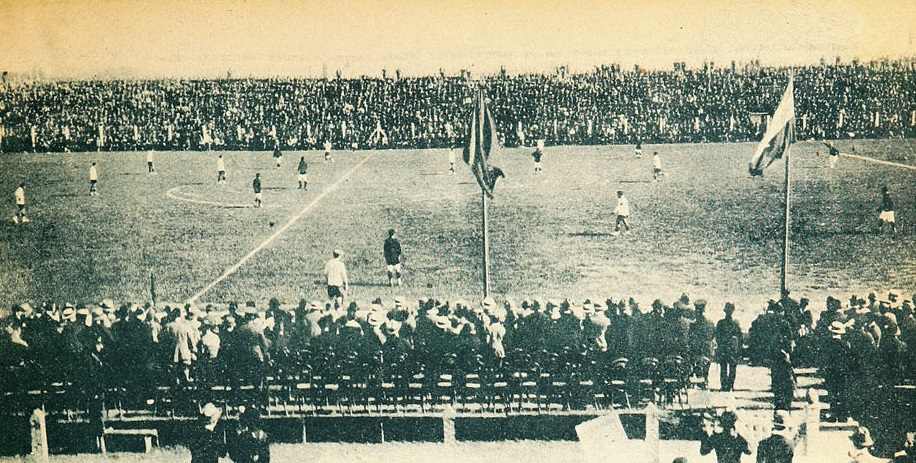

== Summary ==
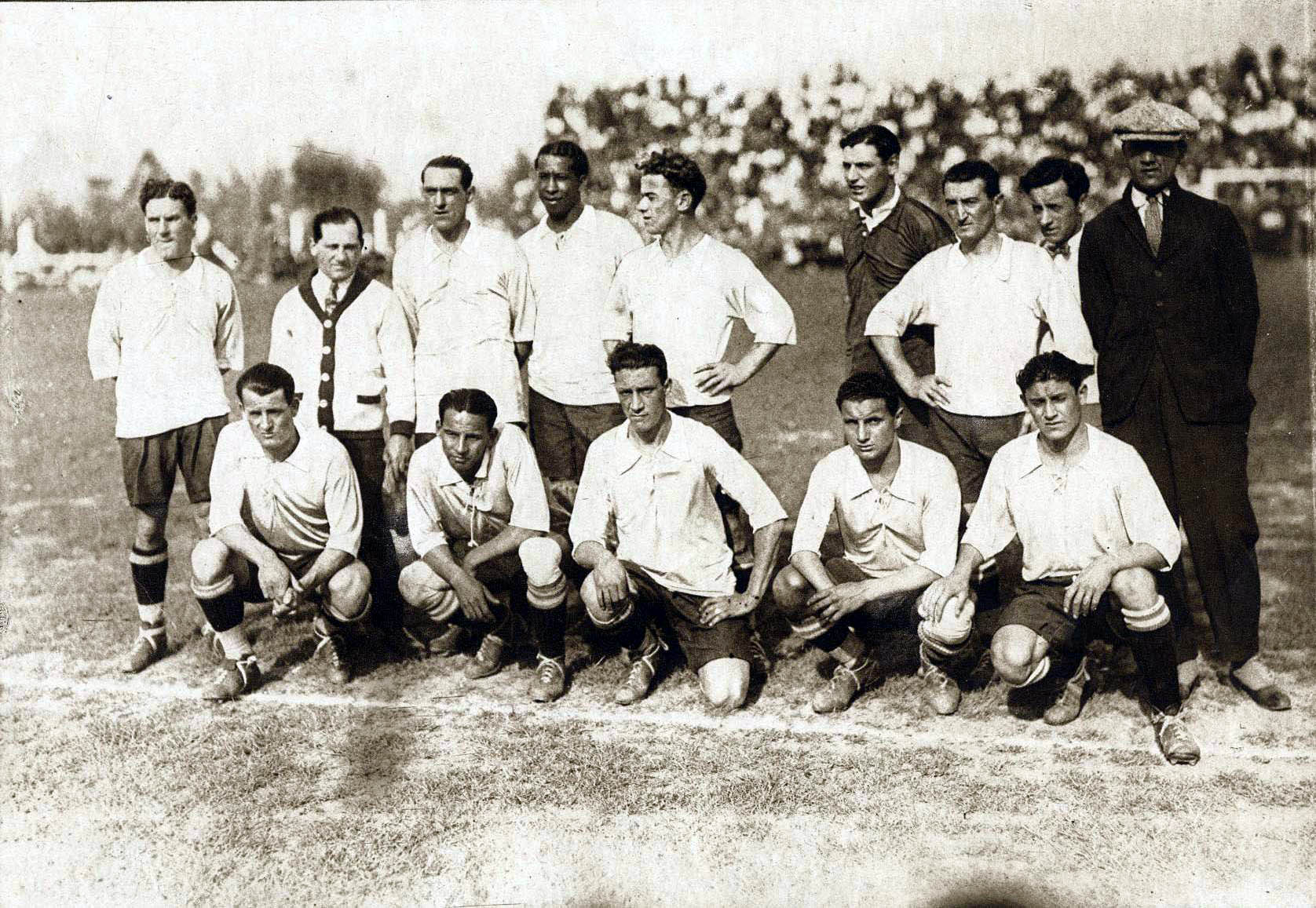
Uruguay squad, winners

The competition began on 12 October when four goals from David Arellano helped hosts Chile to a 7–1 win against Bolivia. Four days later, defending champions Argentina began the competition with a 5–0 win against Bolivia. On 17 October, Uruguay defeated Chile 3–1. Three days later, four goals from Gabino Sosa helped Argentina to an 8–0 win against Paraguay. On 23 October, Paraguay defeated Bolivia 6–1. With half the matches played, Argentina were top of the table with four points, two ahead of Chile, Paraguay and Uruguay.

The following day, Uruguay defeated Argentina 2–0 to pull level on points with their opponents at the top of the table. On 28 October, Uruguay pulled clear at the top after Héctor Scarone scored five times as they won 6–0 against Bolivia. Three days later, Chile and Argentina drew 1–1. On 1 November, Héctor Castro scored four goals to help Uruguay win the title with their fourth win in four matches following a 6–1 win against Paraguay. In the final match of the competition two days later, Arellano scored a hat-trick as Chile defeated Paraguay 5–1.

== Table ==
Pos	Team	Pld	W	D	L	GF	GA	GD	Pts
1	Uruguay	4	4	0	0	17	2	+15	8
2	Argentina	4	2	1	1	14	3	+11	5
2	Chile	4	2	1	1	14	6	+8	5
4	Paraguay	4	1	0	3	8	20	−12	2
5	Bolivia	4	0	0	4	2	24	−22	0

== Results ==
12 October 1926

Chile	7–1	Bolivia
Ramírez 10'; Subiabre 14'; Arellano 15', 41', 80', 84'; Moreno 47'		Aguilar 89'

Estadio Sport de Ñuñoa, Santiago
Referee: Norberto Luis Gallieri (Argentina)

16 October 1926

Argentina	5–0	Bolivia
Cherro 9', 19'; Sosa 31'; Delgado 43'; De Miguel 74'

Estadio Sport de Ñuñoa, Santiago
Referee: Aníbal Tejada (Uruguay)

17 October 1926

Uruguay	3–1	Chile
Borjas 22'; Castro 32'; Scarone 55'		Subiabre 65' (pen.)

Estadio Sport de Ñuñoa, Santiago
Referee: Pedro José Malbrán (Chile)

20 October 1926

Argentina	8–0	Paraguay
Sosa 11', 32', 59', 87'; Cherro 16'; Delgado 40', 42'; De Miguel 52'

Estadio Sport de Ñuñoa, Santiago
Referee: Francisco Jiménez (Chile)

23 October 1926

Bolivia	1–6	Paraguay
C. Soto 88'		C. Ramírez 16', 24'; J. Ramírez 45', 58', 63'; I. López 88'

Estadio Sport de Ñuñoa, Santiago
Referee: Aníbal Tejada (Uruguay)

24 October 1926

Argentina	0–2	Uruguay
		Borjas 22'; Castro 73'

Estadio Sport de Ñuñoa, Santiago
Referee: Miguel Barba (Paraguay)

28 October 1926

Uruguay	6–0	Bolivia
Scarone 9', 12', 28', 39', 81'; Romano 67'

Estadio Sport de Ñuñoa, Santiago
Referee: Juan Pedro Barbera (Argentina)

31 October 1926

Chile	1–1	Argentina
Guillermo Saavedra 25'		Tarasconi 87'

Estadio Sport de Ñuñoa, Santiago
Referee: Miguel Barba (Paraguay)

1 November 1926

Uruguay	6–1	Paraguay
Castro 16', 23', 32', 72'; Saldombide 47' (pen.), 82'		Fleitas Solich 58' (pen.)

Estadio Sport de Ñuñoa, Santiago
Referee: Francisco Jiménez (Chile)

3 November 1926

Chile	5–1	Paraguay
Arellano 21', 64', 71'; Ramírez 42', 82'		Vargas Peña 85'

Estadio Sport de Ñuñoa, Santiago
Referee: Aníbal Tejada (Uruguay)

== Goalscorers ==
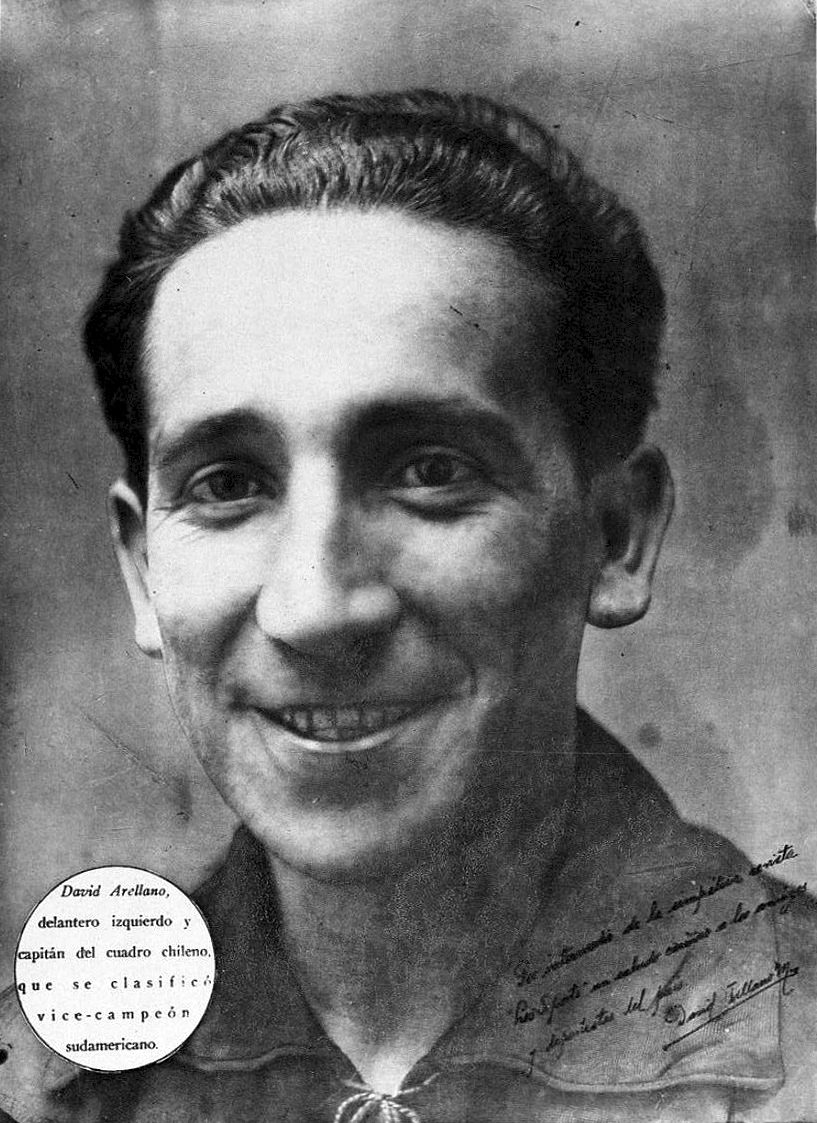
David Arellano, top scorer

There were 55 goals scored in 10 matches, for an average of 5.5 goals per match.

7 goals

- (Chile) David Arellano

6 goals

- (Uruguay) Héctor Castro
- (Uruguay) Héctor Scarone

5 goals

- (Argentina) Gabino Sosa

4 goals

- (Chile) Manuel Ramírez

3 goals

- (Argentina) Roberto Cherro
- (Argentina) Benjamín Delgado
- (Paraguay) Pablo Ramírez

2 goals

- (Argentina) De Miguel
- (Chile) Guillermo Subiabre
- (Paraguay) Carlos Ramírez
- (Uruguay) Borjas
- (Uruguay) Zoilo Saldombide

1 goal

- (Argentina) Domingo Tarasconi
- (Bolivia) Teófilo Aguilar
- (Bolivia) Carlos Soto
- (Chile) Humberto Moreno
- (Paraguay) Manuel Fleitas Solich
- (Paraguay) Ildefonso López
- (Paraguay) Luis Vargas Peña
- (Uruguay) Ángel Romano
