= Amílcar Barbuy =

Italian-Brazilian footballer and manager

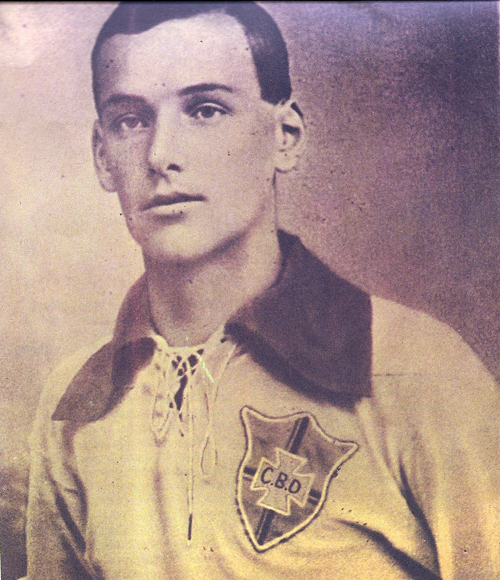

Personal information
- Full name: Amílcar Barbuy
- Date of birth: 29 March 1893
- Place of birth: Rio das Pedras, Brazil
- Date of death: 24 August 1965 (aged 72)
- Place of death: São Paulo, Brazil
- Position: Central midfielder

Senior career*
Years	Team	Apps	(Gls)
1913–1922	Corinthians	208	(89)
1923–1930	Palestra Itália	100	(11)
1931–1932	Lazio	1	(0)

International career
1916–1922	Brazil	15	(4)

Managerial career
- 1915–1923: Corinthians
- 1924–1929: Palestra Itália
- 1931–1932: Lazio
- 1931–1932: Corinthians
- 1939–1940: São Paulo
- 1931–1932: Corinthians
Medal record
Men's football
Representing Brazil
South American Championship
Winner	1919 Brazil
Winner	1922 Brazil
Third place	1916 Argentina
Third place	1917 Uruguay
- * Club domestic league appearances and goals

Amílcar Barbuy (29 March 1893 – 24 August 1965) was an Italian Brazilian football player and manager.

== Club career ==
He played for Palestra Itália and later Lazio at the age of 38, becoming the oldest player ever to debut in the Italian Serie A in 1931, a record that was only broken in 2016 by Maurizio Pugliesi, at the age of 39.

== International career ==
He was the first player in the history of Corinthians to play for the Brazilian national football team, making 19 appearances and scoring five goals.

== Managerial career ==
After ending his playing career, he pursued coaching. He managed Lazio, São Paulo, Palestra Itália, Corinthians, Portuguesa, Portuguesa Santista, and Atlético Mineiro.

== Playing style ==
A striker turned midfielder, he is considered one of the first idols in Corinthians' history.

== Honours ==
=== Players ===
Corinthians

- Campeonato Paulista: 1914, 1916, 1922, 1923

Palestra Itália

- Campeonato Paulista: 1926, 1927

==== Brazil ====
- Copa América: 1919, 1922

=== Manager ===
Corinthians

- Campeonato Paulista: 1916, 1937

Palestra Itália

- Campeonato Paulista: 1926, 1927
