= Benjamín Delgado =

Argentine footballer

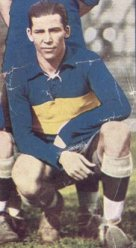

Personal information
- Date of birth: 1 June 1897
- Date of death: 4 November 1953 (aged 56)
- Position: Forward

International career
Years	Team	Apps	(Gls)
1923–1926	Argentina	9	(3)

Benjamín Delgado (1 June 1897 – 4 November 1953) was an Argentine footballer. He played in nine matches for the Argentina national football team from 1923 to 1926. He was also part of Argentina's squad for the 1926 South American Championship.
