= Neco =

Brazilian footballer and manager

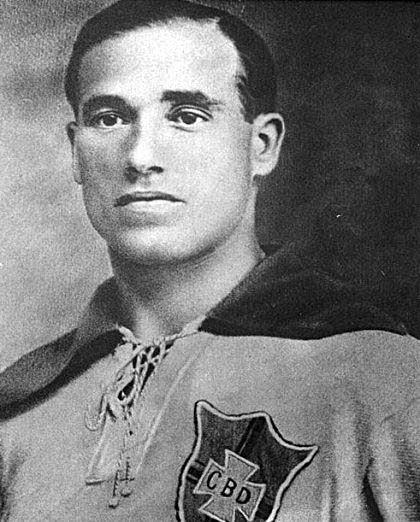

Personal information
- Full name: Manoel Nunes
- Date of birth: March 7, 1895
- Place of birth: São Paulo, SP, Brazil
- Date of death: May 31, 1977 (aged 82)
- Place of death: São Paulo, SP, Brazil
- Positions: Attacking midfielder; striker

Youth career
- 1911–1913: Corinthians

Senior career*
Years	Team	Apps	(Gls)
1913–1930	Corinthians	313	(239)
1915	A.A. Mackenzie College		

International career
1917–1922	Brazil	15	(8)

Managerial career
- 1920: Corinthians
- 1927: Corinthians
- 1937–1938: Corinthians
Medal record
Men's football
Representing Brazil
South American Championship
Winner	1919 Brazil
Winner	1922 Brazil
Third place	1917 Uruguay
- * Club domestic league appearances and goals

Manoel Nunes (March 7, 1895 – May 31, 1977), also known as Neco, was an association football midfielder and striker. With great skill and tenacity, he was the first idol of Corinthians, being the first player to get a statue in the team's gardens (in 1929). As of 2006, Neco is the player who played the longest for Corinthians: 17 years.

Called often to the Brazil national team, he won two South American Championships: 1919 (team's top scorer) and 1922 (top scorer). Playing for Corinthians, he won the Paulista League eight times as a player (being top scorer in 1914 and 1920) and once as a coach (1937).

Neco had a quick temper and frequently got involved in fights; his second stint as a manager occurred because he was suspended as a player for 18 games when he beat a referee.

He started in the third team of Corinthians at the age of 16 and joined the first team in 1913 (the first year Corinthians participated in official competitions). In 1915, Corinthians did not play official games because of political issues and almost went bankrupt; this year, Neco played friendlies for Corinthians and the official games for Mackenzie. During this time, he broke into the Corinthians building to retrieve books that the landlord had locked inside due to non-payment of the rent.

After scoring two goals playing for Brazil against Uruguay in the 2x2 tie valid for the 1919 South American Championship in Rio de Janeiro, Neco returned to his regular job as a carpenter in São Paulo and was fired for missing work.

== Statistical career overview ==
=== Player ===
Teams:

- 1917–1922: Brazil (14 matches / 9 goals / official internationals only)
- 1913–1914: SC Corinthians Paulista
- 1915: AA Mackenzie College
- 1916–1930: SC Corinthians Paulista

Honours:

- Copa América: 1919, 1922
- Campeonato Paulista: 1914, 1916, 1922, 1923, 1924, 1928, 1930

Top Scorer:

- Copa América: 1919 (4 goals)
- Campeonato Paulista: 1914 (12 goals)
- Campeonato Paulista: 1920 (24 goals)

=== Coach ===
Clubs:

- SC Corinthians Paulista : 1920, 1927, 1937–38

Honours:

- Campeonato Paulista: 1937
