= Juan Maglio =

Argentine footballer

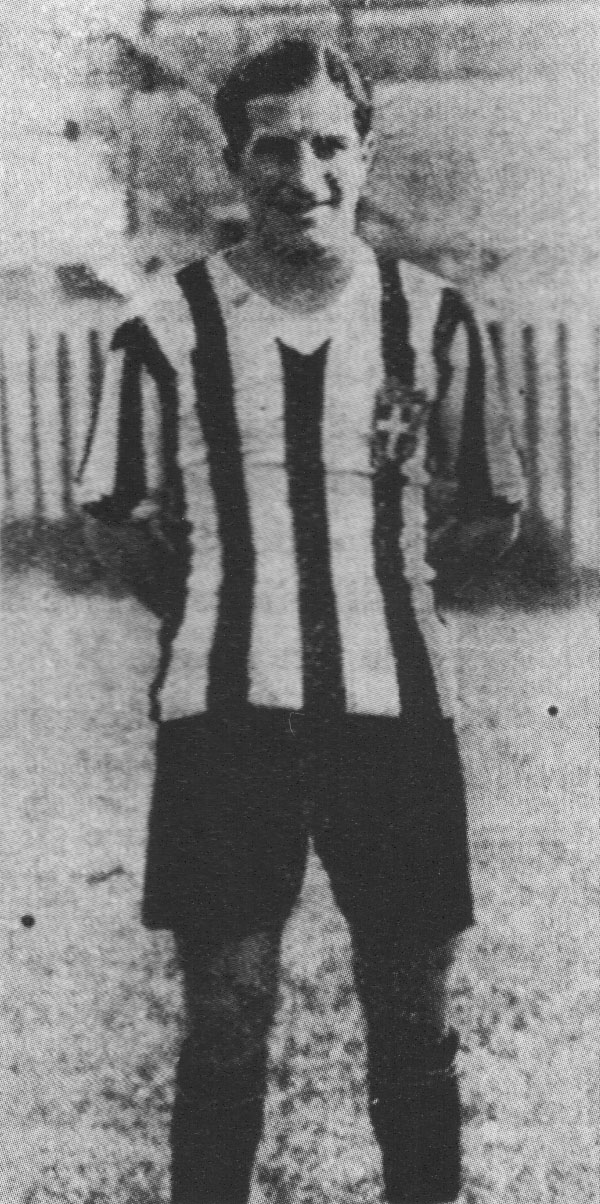
- Maglio with Juventus in the 1931–32 season

Personal information
- Full name: Juan José Maglio
- Date of birth: 1904
- Place of birth: Argentina
- Date of death: 1964
- Position: Midfielder

Senior career*
Years	Team	Apps	(Gls)
1919	Vélez Sarsfield	?	(?)
1920-1922	Nueva Chicago	?	(?)
1922	Almagro	?	(?)
1923–1927	San Lorenzo de Almagro	?	(44)
1925	Nueva Chicago	?	(?)
1928	Ferro Carril Oeste	1	(1)
1928–1930	San Lorenzo de Almagro	?	(31)
1931	Gimnasia y Esgrima La Plata	6	(1)
1931–1932	Juventus	17	(6)
1933	Chacarita Juniors	10	(4)
1934	Ferro Carril Oeste	1	(1)
1934	Vélez Sársfield	2	(0)

International career
1925–1931	Argentina	9	(3)
- * Club domestic league appearances and goals

Juan José Maglio (1904 - 1964) was an Argentine professional football player. He played in nine matches for the Argentina national football team from 1925 to 1931. He was also part of Argentina's squad for the 1927 South American Championship.

== Career ==
Maglio played club football for San Lorenzo de Almagro and Club de Gimnasia y Esgrima La Plata. He moved to Italy to continue his football career.

== Personal ==
Maglio was the son of famous tango musician, Juan Ignacio Maglio ("Pacho").
