= Juan Francia =

Argentine footballer (1897–1962)

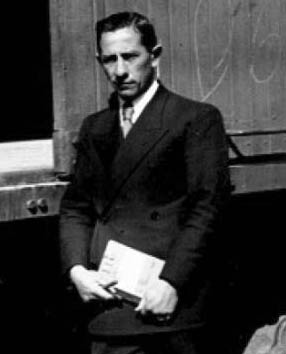

Personal information
- Date of birth: 20 March 1897
- Date of death: 1962 (aged 64–65)

Youth career
- Belgrano (R)

Senior career*
Years	Team	Apps	(Gls)
1915	Gimnasia y Esgrima (R)		
1916	Rosario Puerto Belgrano		
1917	Tiro Federal		
1918–19	Newell's Old Boys		
1920	Tiro Federal		
1920–23	Rosario Central		
1924	Gimnasia y Esgrima (SF)		
1925–29	Newell's Old Boys		
1930–31	Rosario Central		
1931	Provincial		

International career
1918–1922	Argentina	8	(5)
- * Club domestic league appearances and goals

Juan Francia (20 March 1897 – 2 October 1962) was an Argentine footballer, who played as centre forward and left winger. Due to his slim body and great agility, he eventually received the nickname Mono ("Monkey"). Francia's career include tenures on the most renowned clubs of Rosario, such as Tiro Federal, Newell's Old Boys, Rosario Central, and Provincial. He won 6 titles with Rosario Central and 3 with Newell's Old Boys.

In international football, Francia played eight matches for the Argentina national football team from 1918 to 1922. He was also part of Argentina's squad for the 1922 South American Championship, being the top scorer of the tournament.

== Biography ==
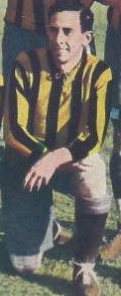
Francia with Rosario Central

His beginnings in football found him playing at an early age for Rosarian Club Belgrano, but he was forced to leave the team due to his short age. Francia then moved to Gimnasia y Esgrima which he joined in 1915. The following year he moved to the recently founded Rosario and Puerto Belgrano, playing the Santiago Pinasco Cup, second division of the Liga Rosarina de Football.

In 1917 he joined Tiro Federal, where he was part of the team that promoted to Rosario's Primera División. His good performances attracted the interest of Newell's Old Boys, which he joined in 1918. With Newell's, Francia won the Copa Nicasio Vila (Liga Rosarina's first division) that same year.

After his tenure on Newell's, Francia returned to Tiro Federal, but in the middle of the championship, a new schism happened in Rosarian football when one of dissident teams, Rosario Central, added Francia to its roster. With the Arroyito team, Francia won his first national title, the Copa de Competencia (Asociación Amateurs) in 1920 after beating Sportivo Almagro 2–0 at GEBA Stadium. Rosario Central also won the 1920 and 1920 Asociación Rosarina de Football championships (dissident competition). When the club returned to Liga Rosarina, they won two competitions else in 1922 and 1923.

After a brief period in Gimnasia y Esgrima de Santa Fe, Francia returned to Newell's in 1925, staying there five years until he joined Rosario Central in 1930. Francia finished his career in Club Atlético Provincial in 1931.

Apart from his football career, Francia worked at the Sunchales station of Central Argentine Railway.

== Titles ==
=== National ===
Rosario Central

- Copa de Competencia (AAmF) (1): 1920

=== Regional ===
Newell's Old Boys

- Copa Nicasio Vila (2): 1918, 1929
- Copa Estímulo (1): 1925

Rosario Central

- Asociación Amateurs Rosarina de Football (2): 1920, 1921
- Copa Estímulo (1): 1922
- Copa Nicasio Vila (2): 1923, 1930

== In his own words ==
In Buenos Aires, teams have better defenses. Porteño forwards are really good. But we have a better attacking play than them. Our style of play pays off so it is not designed to impress audiences. Our tactic is demolishing and vigoruous to an extent that it can't be matched by bonaerense players. Rosarian players are first class footballers. I think that Adolfo Celli, Antonio Miguel, Atilio Badalini, Ennis Hayes, Roberto Cochrane, Florencio Sarasíbar, Julio and Humberto Libonatti are the best.

— Francia comparising Rosarian and Buenos Aires football tactics and players
