= Carlos Elizeche =

Paraguayan footballer

Personal information
- Full name: Carlos Elizeche Benítez
- Place of birth: Paraguay
- Position: Forward

Senior career*
Years	Team	Apps	(Gls)
- Atlántida

International career
1922–1923	Paraguay	4	(1)
- * Club domestic league appearances and goals

Carlos Elizeche Benítez was a Paraguayan footballer who played as a forward.

While playing for Atlántida Sport Club, he took part in the 1922 South American Championship, in which the Paraguay national team finished as runners-up. Elizeche played only in the match against Uruguay, scoring the only goal of the match and securing Paraguay's victory.

A year later, he took part in the 1923 Copa Chevallier Boutell, which was won by Paraguay. Elizeche played in both matches against Argentina.

He subsequently participated in the 1923 South American Championship, where Paraguay finished in third place. Once again, Elizeche played only in the match against Uruguay.
