= 1914 Campeonato Paulista =

In the 1914 season of the Campeonato Paulista, two championships were played, each by a different league.

== APSA Championship ==
Campeonato Paulista
- Season: 1914
- Champions: São Bento
- Matches played: 30
- Goals scored: 106 (3.53 per match)
- Top goalscorer: Arthur Friedenreich (Ypiranga) – 12 goals
- Biggest home win: Paulistano 5-2 Scottish Wanderers (June 21, 1914)
- Biggest away win: São Bento 0-5 Mackenzie (May 21, 1914); AA das Palmeiras 0-5 Ypiranga (October 11, 1914)
- Highest scoring: Mackenzie 4-3 AA das Palmeiras (June 20, 1914); Paulistano 5-2 Scottish Wanderers (June 21, 1914)

In the APSA-organized Campeonato Paulista, the championship had doubled in size, with Ypiranga defecting from LPF, and the additions of Scottish Wanderers, formed by former São Paulo Athletic players, and São Bento. The latter was formed by former students of the Ginásio São Bento, and fielding some of the best players of the time, won the title in its debut. the top scorer was Ypiranga's Arthur Friedenreich with 12 goals.

=== System ===
The championship was disputed in a double-round robin system, with the team with the most points winning the title.

=== Championship ===
Pos	Team	Pld	W	D	L	GF	GA	GD	Pts	Qualification or relegation
1	São Bento	10	7	1	2	21	16	+5	15	Champions
2	Paulistano	10	7	0	3	22	15	+7	14	
3	Mackenzie	10	5	1	4	20	14	+6	11	
4	Ypiranga	10	4	3	3	19	15	+4	11	
5	Scottish Wanderers	10	2	1	7	13	23	−10	5	
6	AA das Palmeiras	10	1	2	7	11	23	−12	4	

Updated to match(es) played on November 1, 1914. Source: RSSSF.com
Rules for classification: 1) points; 2) goal difference; 3) wins; 4) head-to-head points.

== LPF Championship ==
Campeonato Paulista
- Season: 1914
- Champions: Corinthians
- Matches played: 32
- Goals scored: 106 (3.31 per match)
- Top goalscorer: Neco (Corinthians) – 12 goals
- Biggest home win: Germânia 7-0 Campos Elyseos (April 21, 1914)
- Biggest away win: Luzitano 0-6 Corinthians (April 12, 1914)
- Highest scoring: Germânia 7-0 Campos Elyseos (April 21, 1914)

The edition of the 1914 Campeonato Paulista organized by the LPF (Liga Paulista de Football) ended with Corinthians winning the title for the 1st time. the top scorer was Corinthians's Neco with 12 goals. That edition is also notable for being the first time a team from outside the cities of São Paulo and Santos participated in the Campeonato Paulista, this team being Hydecroft, from Jundiaí, which however, withdrew before the end of the championship.

=== System ===
The championship was disputed in a double-round robin system, with the team with the most points winning the title.

=== Championship ===
Pos	Team	Pld	W	D	L	GF	GA	GD	Pts	Qualification or relegation
1	Corinthians	10	10	0	0	37	9	+28	20	Champions
2	Campos Elyseos	10	5	1	4	16	24	−8	11 (Note: The second match between Campos Elyseos and Minas Gerais wasn't held)	
3	Internacional	10	3	1	6	14	20	−6	7	
4	Minas Gerais	10	2	2	6	9	18	−9	6	
5	Luzitano	10	2	1	7	7	19	−12	5	
6	Germânia	6	5	0	1	16	3	+13	10	Withdrew
7	Hydecroft	8	2	1	5	7	13	−6	5	Withdrew

Updated to match(es) played on November 22, 1914. Source: RSSSF.com
Rules for classification: 1) points; 2) goal difference; 3) wins; 4) head-to-head points.
