= 1920 South American Championship =

Football tournament

Tournament details
- Host country: Chile
- Dates: 11–26 September 1920
- Teams: 4
- Venue(s): Estadio Valparaiso Sporting Club, Viña del Mar

Final positions
- Champions: Uruguay (3rd title)
- Runners-up: Argentina
- Third place: Brazil
- Fourth place: Chile

Tournament statistics
- Matches played: 6
- Goals scored: 16 (2.67 per match)
- Top scorer(s): (Uruguay) José Pérez (Uruguay) Ángel Romano (3 goals each)

The 1920 South American Championship (Spanish: Campeonato Sudamericano 1920, Portuguese: Campeonato Sul-Americano de 1920) was the fourth international association football championship for members of the Confederación Sudamericana de Fútbol (CONMEBOL). Hosted by Chile, the competition ran from 11–26 September 1920 and was contested by the national teams of Argentina, Brazil, Chile and Uruguay.

During the competition, Brazil lost heavily to Uruguay 6–0. It would remain the team's largest defeat until it was equalled by a 7–1 loss to Germany at the 2014 FIFA World Cup.

In the final round of matches of the round-robin tournament, Uruguay defeated 2–1 to win the championships for the third time.

The tournament is also notable for the participation of Chilean defender Ramón Unzaga Asla, who is recognized across sports historiography as the creator of the bicycle kick. During the competition, Unzaga executed his signature acrobatic maneuver on several occasions. His unprecedented displays of the technique captivated both the attendees and the international sports press.

== Background ==
In 1910, the Asociación del Fútbol Argentino (AFA) organised a tournament to mark the 100th anniversary of the May Revolution. The Copa Centenario Revolución de Mayo was contested by the national teams of Argentina, Chile and Uruguay and is considered to be a precursor to the South American Championship. Six years later, the AFA organised a second tournament, this time to celebrate the centenary of the Argentine Declaration of Independence. Alongside the three who had contested the Copa Centenario Revolución de Mayo, Brazil were invited to compete and the South American Championship was born. During the competition, the four associations of the competing teams met on 9 July 1916 and founded the Confederación Sudamericana de Fútbol (CONMEBOL).

Brazil were the defending champions having won the 1919 edition after defeating Uruguay 1–0 after extra time in the championship play-off. Uruguay were the most successful team in the history of the competition having won the first two editions.

== Format ==
The tournament was played as a round-robin where each team would play all of the others once. The winner would be decided by the total number of points obtained across all matches played.

=== Participants ===
- Argentina
- Brazil
- Chile
- Uruguay

== Venue ==
All matches were held at the Estadio Valparaiso Sporting Club in Viña del Mar.

Viña del Mar
Estadio Valparaiso Sporting Club
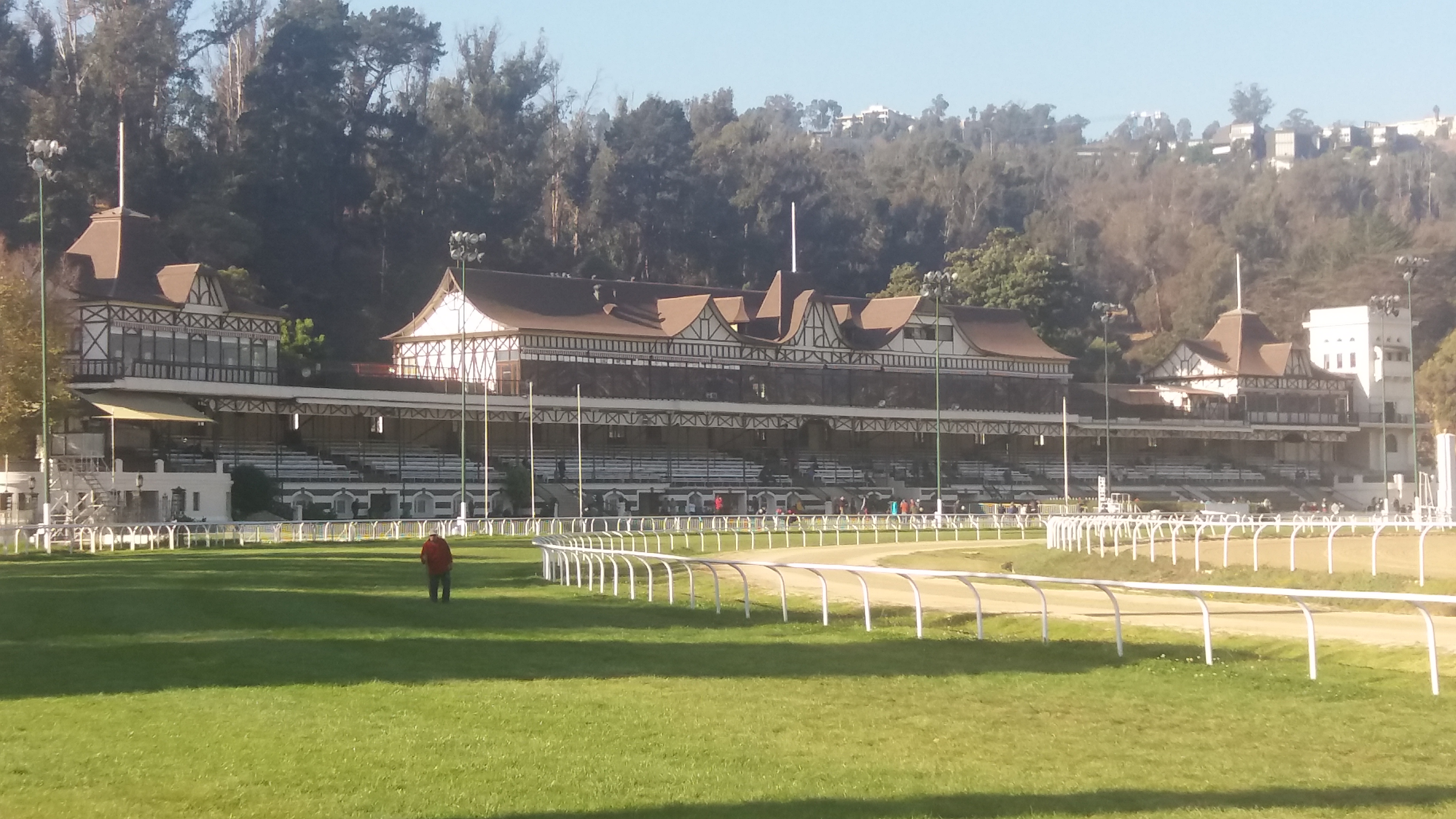

== Summary ==
The competition began on 11 September when defending champions Brazil defeated hosts Chile 1–0. The following day, Uruguay and Argentina drew 1–1. On 18 September, Brazil experienced their biggest ever defeat, losing 6–0 to Uruguay – a result which would not be equalled for 94 years when they lost 7–1 against Germany at the 2014 FIFA World Cup.

On 20 September, Argentina drew 1–1 with Chile. Five days later, Argentina defeated Brazil 2–0 to go top of the table with just one game left to be played. However, on 26 September Uruguay defeated Chile 2–1 in the final match to move top of the table and win the competition for the third time.

== Table ==
Pos	Team	Pld	W	D	L	GF	GA	GD	Pts
1	Uruguay	3	2	1	0	9	2	+7	5
2	Argentina	3	1	2	0	4	2	+2	4
3	Brazil	3	1	0	2	1	8	−7	2
4	Chile	3	0	1	2	2	4	−2	1

== Results ==
11 September 1920

Brazil	1–0	Chile
Alvariza 53'

Estadio Valparaíso Sporting Club, Viña del Mar
Referee: Martín Aphesteguy (Uruguay)

12 September 1920

Argentina	1–1	Uruguay
Echeverría 75'		Piendibene 10'

Estadio Valparaíso Sporting Club, Viña del Mar
Referee: Francisco Jiménez (Chile)

18 September 1920

Uruguay	6–0	Brazil
Romano 23', 60'; Urdinarán 26' (pen.); Pérez 29', 65'; Campolo 48'

Estadio Valparaíso Sporting Club, Viña del Mar
Referee: Carlos Fanta (Chile)

20 September 1920

Chile	1–1	Argentina
Bolados 30'		Dellavalle 13'

Estadio Valparaíso Sporting Club, Viña del Mar
Referee: João De María (Brazil)

25 September 1920

Argentina	2–0	Brazil
Echeverría 40'; Libonatti 73'

Estadio Valparaíso Sporting Club, Viña del Mar
Referee: Martín Aphesteguy (Uruguay)

26 September 1920

Uruguay	2–1	Chile
Romano 37'; Pérez 65'		Domínguez 60'

Estadio Valparaíso Sporting Club, Viña del Mar
Referee: Carlos Fanta (Chile)

== Goalscorers ==
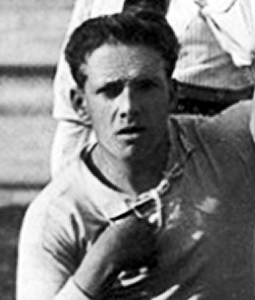
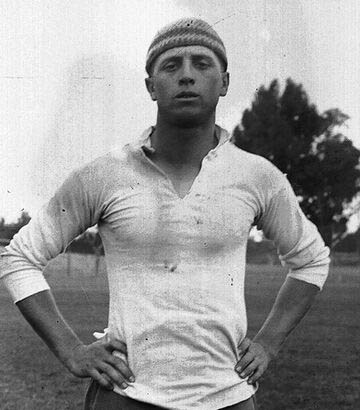
José Pérez (left) and Ángel Romano, top scorers

There were 16 goals scored in 6 matches, for an average of 2.67 goals per match.

3 goals

- (Uruguay) José Pérez
- (Uruguay) Ángel Romano

2 goals

- (Argentina) Raúl Echeverría

1 goal

- (Argentina) Miguel Dellavalle
- (Argentina) Julio Libonatti
- (Brazil) Ismael Alvariza
- (Chile) Hernando Bolados
- (Chile) Aurelio Domínguez
- (Uruguay) Antonio Campolo
- (Uruguay) José Piendibene
- (Uruguay) Antonio Urdinarán
