= Miguel Dellavalle =

Argentine footballer

Personal information
- Date of birth: December 1898
- Date of death: 22 November 1932 (aged 33)
- Position: Midfielder

International career
Years	Team	Apps	(Gls)
1920–1922	Argentina	8	(1)

Miguel Dellavalle (December 1898 – 22 November 1932) was an Argentine footballer. He played in eight matches for the Argentina national football team from 1920 to 1922. He was also part of Argentina's squad for the 1920 South American Championship.
