= Adolfo Celli =

Argentine footballer (1896–1968)

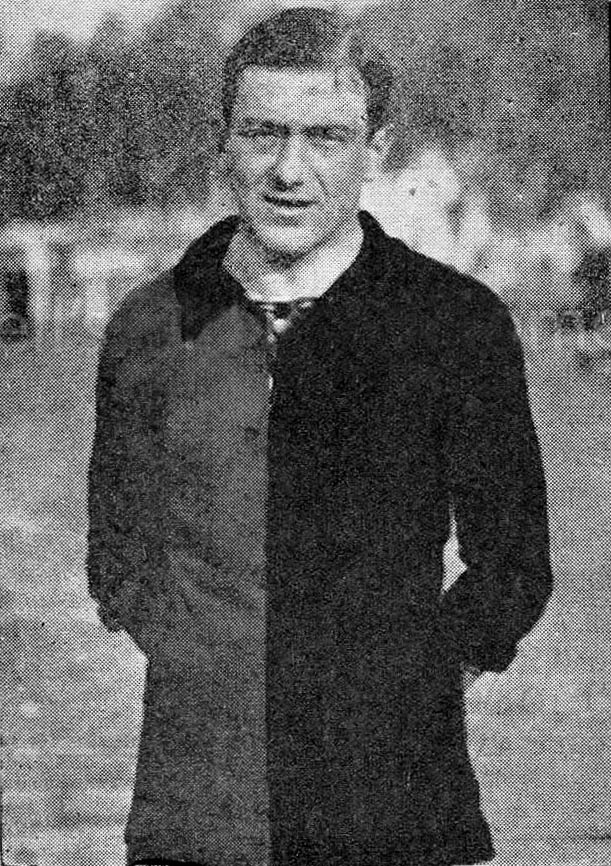
- Celli playing for Newell's O.B.

Personal information
- Date of birth: 31 December 1896
- Date of death: 23 February 1968 (aged 71)
- Position: Defender

International career
Years	Team	Apps	(Gls)
1919–1924	Argentina	14	(0)

Adolfo Celli (31 December 1896 – 23 February 1968) was an Argentine footballer. He played in 14 matches for the Argentina national football team from 1919 to 1924. He was also part of Argentina's squad for the 1921 South American Championship.
