= Imparatinho =

Brazilian footballer (born 1898)

Personal information
- Full name: Caetano Imparato
- Date of birth: 26 November 1898
- Place of birth: Sorocaba, São Paulo, Brazil
- Position: Forward

Senior career*
Years	Team	Apps	(Gls)
- Palmeiras

International career
1922	Brazil	1	(2)
- * Club domestic league appearances and goals

Caetano Imparato (26 November 1898 – unknown), known as Imparatinho, was a Brazilian footballer who played for Palmeiras. He was capped once by the Brazil national football team in 1922, scoring two goals.

== Career statistics ==
=== International ===
National team	Year	Apps	Goals
Brazil	1922	1	2
Total		1	2

=== International goals ===
Scores and results list Brazil's goal tally first, score column indicates score after each Brazil goal.

List of international goals scored by Imparatinho
No.	Date	Venue	Opponent	Score	Result	Competition
1	29 October 1922	Campo da Floresta, São Paulo, Brazil	Paraguay	?–?	3–1	Taça Rodrigues Alves
2	29 October 1922	Campo da Floresta, São Paulo, Brazil	Paraguay	?–?	3–1	Taça Rodrigues Alves
