= Ángel Chiessa =

Argentine footballer

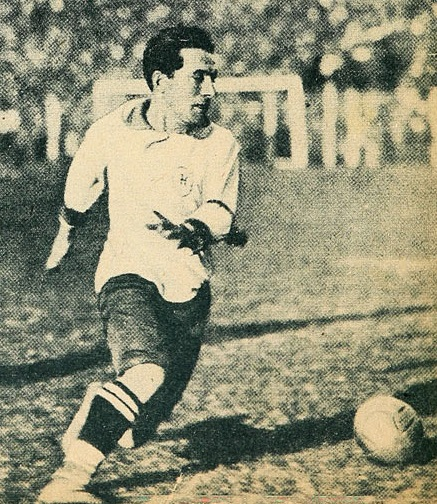

Personal information
- Full name: Ángel Domingo Chiessa
- Date of birth: 1902
- Date of death: 15 October 1961 (aged 58–59)
- Position: Forward

International career
Years	Team	Apps	(Gls)
1922–1923	Argentina	9	(1)

Ángel Chiessa (1902 – 15 October 1961) was an Argentine footballer. He played in nine matches for the Argentina national football team in 1922 and 1923. He was also part of Argentina's squad for the 1922 South American Championship.
