= Manuel Varela (footballer) =

Uruguayan footballer (1892-1927)

Personal information
- Date of birth: 17 June 1892
- Place of birth: Montevideo
- Date of death: 1927 (aged 34–35)
- Position: Defender

International career
Years	Team	Apps	(Gls)
1914–1919	Uruguay	12	(0)

Manuel Varela (17 June 1892–1927) was a Uruguayan footballer. He played in twelve matches for the Uruguay national football team from 1914 to 1919. He was also part of Uruguay's squad for the 1916 South American Championship.
