= Carlos Izaguirre =

Argentine footballer

Personal information
- Date of birth: 30 May 1895
- Date of death: 8 July 1975 (aged 80)

International career
| Years | Team | Apps | (Gls) |
| 1914 | Argentina | 3 | (2) |

Carlos Izaguirre (30 May 1895 – 8 July 1975) was an Argentine footballer. He played in three matches for the Argentina national football team in 1914. He was also part of Argentina's squad for the 1919 South American Championship.
