= Antonio de Miguel (footballer, born 1899) =

Argentine footballer

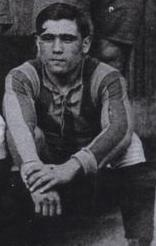

Personal information
- Full name: Antonio de Miguel
- Date of birth: 25 June 1899
- Position: Forward

International career
Years	Team	Apps	(Gls)
1920–1926	Argentina	11	(2)

Antonio de Miguel (born 25 June 1899, death on 28 February 1976) was an Argentine footballer. He played in 11 matches for the Argentina national football team from 1920 to 1926. He was also part of Argentina's squad for the 1920 South American Championship.
