= Andrés Stagnaro =

Argentine footballer

Personal information
- Full name: Andrés Armando Stagnaro
- Date of birth: November 19, 1907
- Place of birth: Buenos Aires, Argentina
- Position: Defender

Senior career*
Years	Team	Apps	(Gls)
1925	Chacarita		
1931	Chacarita	12	(3)
1932	Racing Club		
1933	Atlanta	1	(0)
1933–1935	Roma	26	(0)
1936–1938	Racing Club		

International career
	Argentina	3	(0)
- * Club domestic league appearances and goals

Andrés Armando Stagnaro, also known as Andrea Stagnaro (born November 19, 1907) was an Argentine professional football player. He also held Italian citizenship.

He played for 2 seasons (26 games, no goals) in the Serie A for A.S. Roma.
