= Manuel Bravo (footballer, born 1897) =

Chilean footballer (1897–1974)

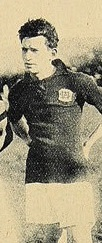

Personal information
- Full name: Manuel Bravo Paredes
- Date of birth: 17 February 1897
- Place of birth: Chile
- Date of death: 7 November 1974 (aged 77)
- Place of death: Chile
- Position: Forward

Senior career*
Years	Team	Apps	(Gls)
1922	Unión Coquimbo		
1924–1928	Santiago Wanderers		
1931	Everton		

International career
1922–1928	Chile	4	(2)
- * Club domestic league appearances and goals

Manuel Bravo Paredes (February 17, 1897 – November 7, 1974) was a Chilean footballer who competed in the 1928 Summer Olympics. During his career he played for Santiago Wanderers and the Chile national football team. He was also a goal scorer in the 1922 Copa América.
