= 1919 South American Championship =

Football tournament

1919 South American Championship of Nations
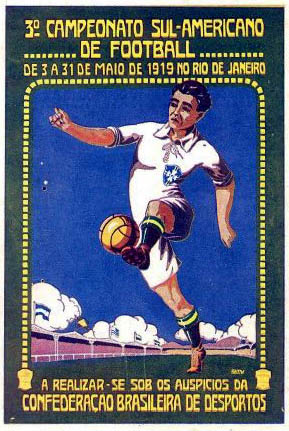
- Poster

Tournament details
- Host country: Brazil
- Dates: 11–29 May
- Teams: 4 (from 1 confederation)
- Venue: 1 (in 1 host city)

Final positions
- Champions: Brazil (1st title)
- Runners-up: Uruguay
- Third place: Argentina
- Fourth place: Chile

Tournament statistics
- Matches played: 7
- Goals scored: 27 (3.86 per match)
- Attendance: 132,500 (18,929 per match)
- Top scorer(s): (Brazil) Arthur Friedenreich (Brazil) Neco (4 goals each)

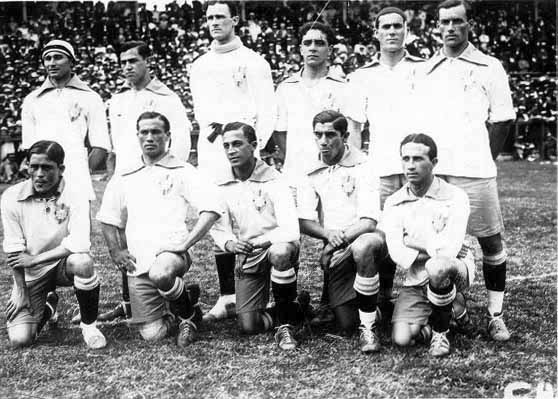
The Brazilian team that won its first championship.

The 1919 South American Championship of Nations was the third continental championship for South American national football teams. It was held in Rio de Janeiro, Brazil from 11 to 29 May 1919.

The participating countries were Brazil, Argentina, Chile and Uruguay as the defending champion.

After finishing tied in the group standings on points, host Brazil beat Uruguay in the playoff match to win their first title.

The playoff was the longest match in the competition's history, and under current rules, will remain so indefinitely: with the score tied 0-0 after 90 minutes had expired, both captains and the referee agreed to play an extra time period of two 15-minute halves. When 120 minutes expired with the score still tied 0-0, both captains and the referee agreed to play a second extra time period of two 15-minute halves; thus, the playoff match lasted 150 minutes.

== Format ==
There was no qualifying for the tournament. The participating countries were Argentina, Brazil, Chile and Uruguay. All teams competed between each other in a single group. Two points were awarded for a win, one for a draw and zero for a defeat. If there was a tie of points at the top of the standings, a playoff match would be held to determine the champion.

== Squads ==
For a complete list of participating squads see: 1919 South American Championship squads

== Venues ==
Rio de Janeiro
Estádio das Laranjeiras
Capacity: 19,000
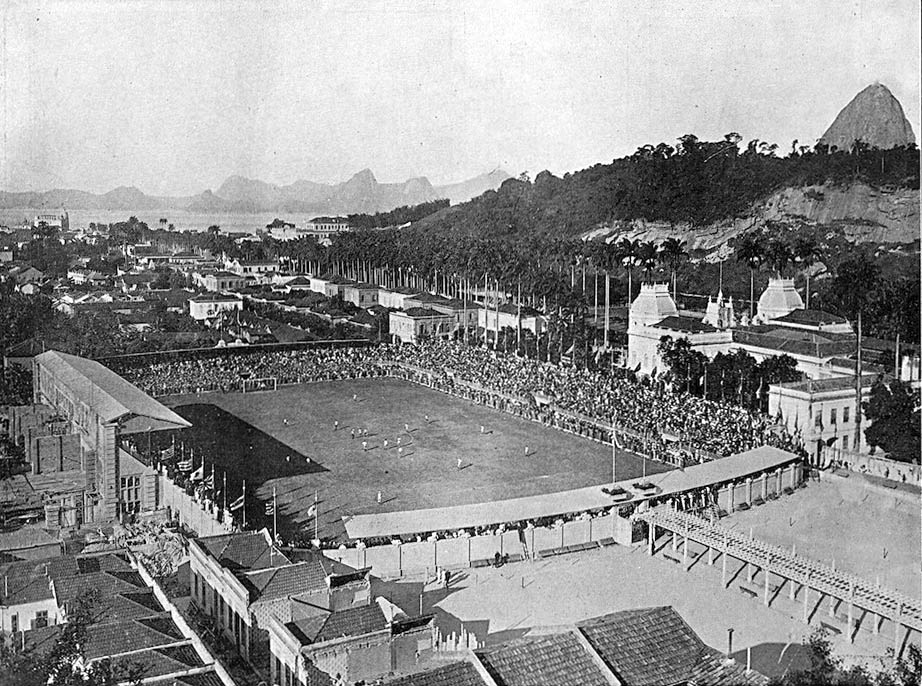

== Final round ==
Each team played one match against each of the other teams. Two points were awarded for a win, one point for a draw and zero points for a defeat.

Team	Pld	W	D	L	GF	GA	GD	Pts
Brazil	3	2	1	0	11	3	+8	5
Uruguay	3	2	1	0	7	4	+3	5
Argentina	3	1	0	2	7	7	0	2
Chile	3	0	0	3	1	12	−11	0

11 May 1919

Brazil	6–0	Chile
Friedenreich 19', 38', 76'; Neco 21', 83'; Haroldo 79'

Estádio das Laranjeiras, Rio de Janeiro
Attendance: 20,000
Referee: Juan Pedro Barbera (Argentina)

13 May 1919

Argentina	2–3	Uruguay
Izaguirre 34'; Varela 79' (o.g.)		C. Scarone 19'; H. Scarone 23'; Gradín 85'

Estádio das Laranjeiras, Rio de Janeiro
Attendance: 18,000
Referee: Robert Todd (England)

17 May 1919

Uruguay	2–0	Chile
C. Scarone 31'; J. Pérez 43'

Estádio das Laranjeiras, Rio de Janeiro
Attendance: 8,000
Referee: Adilton Ponteado (Brazil)

18 May 1919

Brazil	3–1	Argentina
Héitor 22'; Amílcar 57'; Millón 77'		Izaguirre 65'

Estádio das Laranjeiras, Rio de Janeiro
Attendance: 21,000
Referee: Robert Todd (England)

22 May 1919

Argentina	4–1	Chile
Clarcke 10', 23', 62'; Izaguirre 13'		France 33'

Estádio das Laranjeiras, Rio de Janeiro
Attendance: 15,000
Referee: Joaquim de Castro (Brazil)

26 May 1919

Uruguay	2–2	Brazil
Gradín 13'; C. Scarone 17'		Neco 29', 63'

Estádio das Laranjeiras, Rio de Janeiro
Attendance: 23,000
Referee: Robert Todd (England)

=== Play-off ===
29 May 1919

Brazil	1–0 (a.e.t.)	Uruguay
Friedenreich 122'

Estádio das Laranjeiras, Rio de Janeiro
Attendance: 27,500
Referee: Juan P. Barbera (Argentina)

== Result ==
1919 South American Championship champions

Brazil
First title

== Goal scorers ==
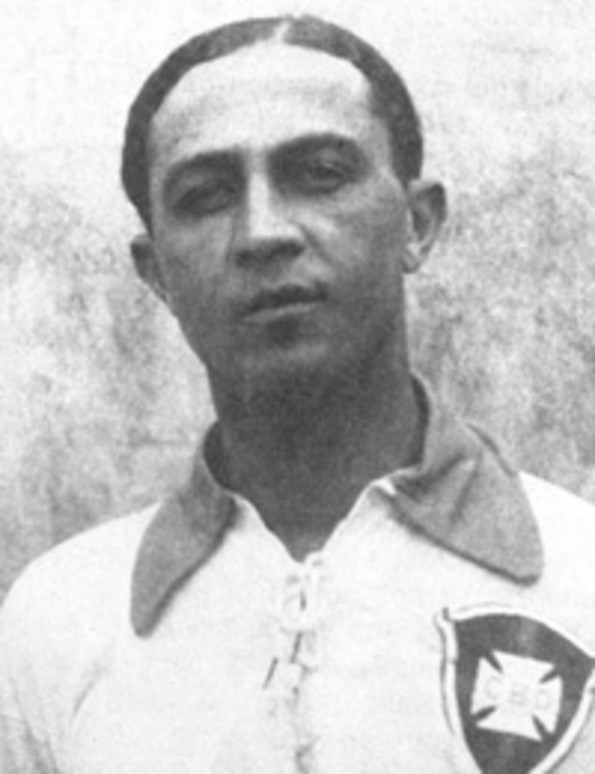
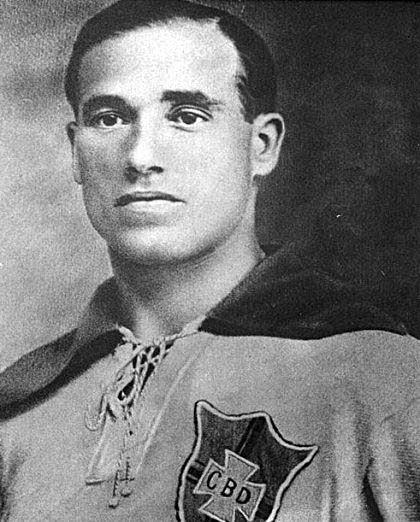
Arthur Friedenreich (left) and Neco, top scorers

4 goals

- (Brazil) Arthur Friedenreich
- (Brazil) Neco

3 goals

- (Argentina) Edwin Clarcke
- (Argentina) Carlos Izaguirre
- (Uruguay) Carlos Scarone

2 goals

- (Uruguay) Isabelino Gradín

1 goal

- (Brazil) Amílcar
- (Brazil) Haroldo
- (Brazil) Héitor
- (Brazil) Millon
- (Chile) Alfredo France
- (Uruguay) José Pérez
- (Uruguay) Héctor Scarone

Own goals

- (Uruguay) Manuel Varela (for Argentina)

== Aftermath ==
The day after the final, Uruguayan goalkeeper Roberto Chery died in hospital in Rio de Janeiro of a strangulated hernia; he had been injured after attempting to stop a goal during the match against Chile. As substitutions were not allowed at the time, Chery had to play the rest of the match while severely injured.

Brazil and Uruguay had scheduled a friendly match ("Copa Rio Branco") for 19 June 1919, but following Chery's tragic death, the Uruguayan team declined to play. Argentina offered to replace the Uruguayan side, which the Brazilian Federation accepted, and the match was played as the "Copa Roberto Chery" to honor the late Uruguayan goalkeeper. Argentina entered the field wearing Uruguay's traditional light-blue jersey, while Brazil wore the jersey of Uruguayan club Peñarol.
