= Tatú (footballer, born 1898) =

Brazilian footballer (1898–1932)

Personal information
- Full name: Altino Marcondes
- Date of birth: 16 July 1898
- Place of birth: Taubaté, Brazil
- Date of death: 25 May 1932 (aged 33)

International career
Years	Team	Apps	(Gls)
1922	Brazil	5	(1)

Altino Marcondes (16 July 1898 – 25 May 1932), known as just Tatú, was a Brazilian footballer. He played in five matches for the Brazil national football team in 1922. He was also part of Brazil's squad for the 1922 South American Championship.
