= Associação Atlética Mackenzie College =

Mackenzie College
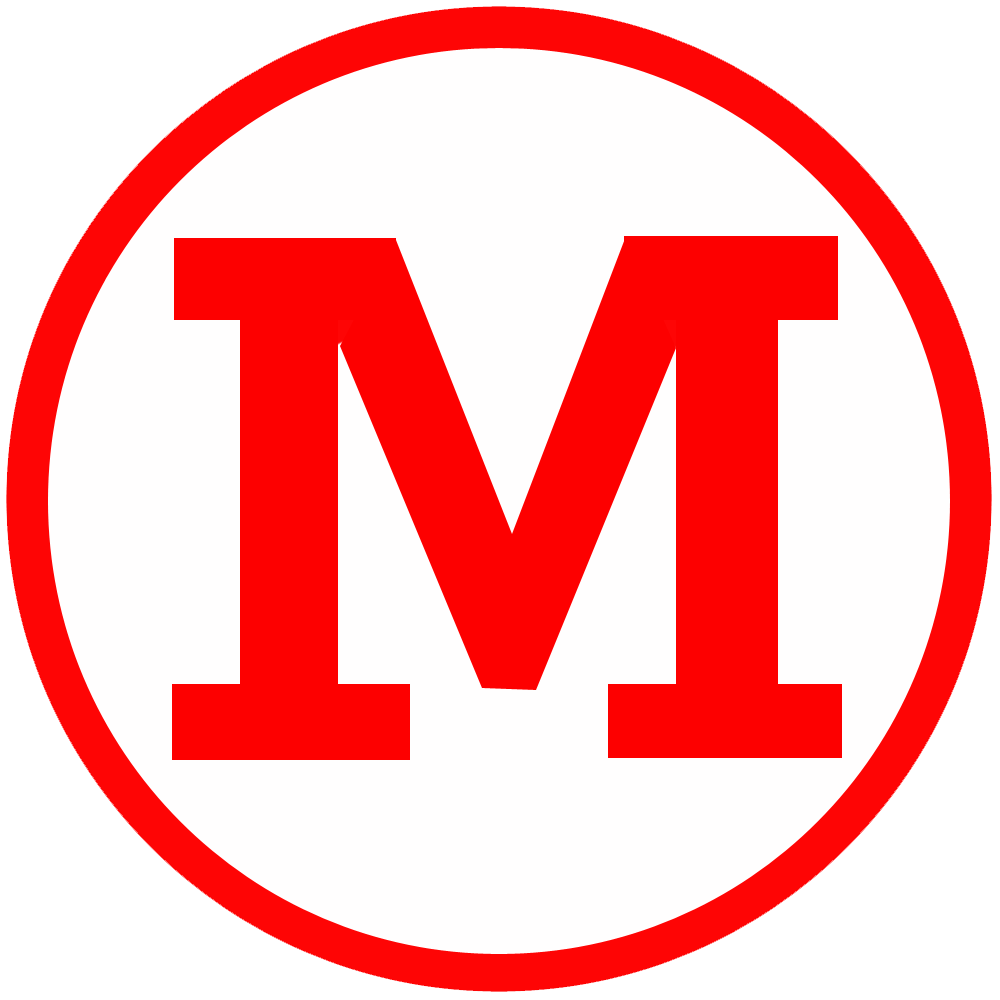
- Full name: Associação Atlética Mackenzie College
- Founded: 18 August 1898; 127 years ago
- Dissolved: 1923
Home colors

Associação Atlética Mackenzie College, commonly known as Mackenzie College, was a Brazilian football team from São Paulo, São Paulo state. They competed several times in the Campeonato Paulista.

== History ==
Associação Atlética Mackenzie College was founded on 18 August 1898. Belfort Duarte was one of the club's founders. They competed in the Campeonato Paulista during the 1900s, and consistently competed during all the 1910s. The club merged with Portuguesa in 1920, and was then renamed to Mackenzie-Portuguesa, competing in the Campeonato Paulista in 1920, 1921 and in 1922. The merger ended in 1923, and then Mackenzie College folded.

== Honours ==
- Campeonato Paulista
  - Runners-up (2): 1913, 1915
