= 1922 South American Championship =

Football tournament

Tournament details
- Host country: Brazil
- Dates: 17 September – 6 November 1922
- Teams: 5
- Venue(s): Estádio de Laranjeiras, Rio de Janeiro

Final positions
- Champions: Brazil (2nd title)
- Runners-up: Paraguay
- Third place: Uruguay
- Fourth place: Argentina

Tournament statistics
- Matches played: 11
- Goals scored: 22 (2 per match)
- Top scorer: (Argentina) Julio Francia (4 goals)

The 1922 South American Championship (Spanish: Campeonato Sudamericano 1922, Portuguese: Campeonato Sul-Americano de 1922) was the sixth international association football championship for members of the Confederación Sudamericana de Fútbol (CONMEBOL). Hosted by Brazil, the competition ran from 17 September – 6 November 1922 and was contested by the national teams of Argentina, Brazil, Chile, Paraguay and Uruguay.

After the completion of the round-robin tournament, three teams – Brazil, Paraguay and Uruguay – were tied level on points. With no tiebreaking criteria, a series of play-offs was to be organised to decide the champion. However, Uruguay withdrew in protest at refereeing decisions so Brazil and Paraguay played for the title. Brazil won the play-off 3–0 to win the championships for the second time.

== Background ==
In 1910, the Asociación del Fútbol Argentino (AFA) organised a tournament to mark the 100th anniversary of the May Revolution. The Copa Centenario Revolución de Mayo was contested by the national teams of Argentina, Chile and Uruguay and is considered to be a precursor to the South American Championship. Six years later, the AFA organised a second tournament, this time to celebrate the centenary of the Argentine Declaration of Independence. Alongside the three who had contested the Copa Centenario Revolución de Mayo, Brazil were invited to compete and the South American Championship was born. During the competition, the four associations of the competing teams met on 9 July 1916 and founded the Confederación Sudamericana de Fútbol (CONMEBOL).

Argentina were the defending champions having won the 1921 edition after defeating Uruguay 1–0 in the final match of the competition. Uruguay were the most successful team in the history of the competition having won the three of the first five editions.

== Format ==
The tournament was played as a round-robin where each team would play all of the others once. The winner would be decided by the total number of points obtained across all matches played. Should two or more teams be tied with the greatest number of points, a play-off would be organised to decide the winner.

=== Participants ===
- Argentina
- Brazil
- Chile
- Paraguay
- Uruguay

== Venue ==
All matches were held at the Estádio de Laranjeiras in Rio de Janeiro.

Rio de Janeiro
Estádio de Laranjeiras
Capacity: 20,000
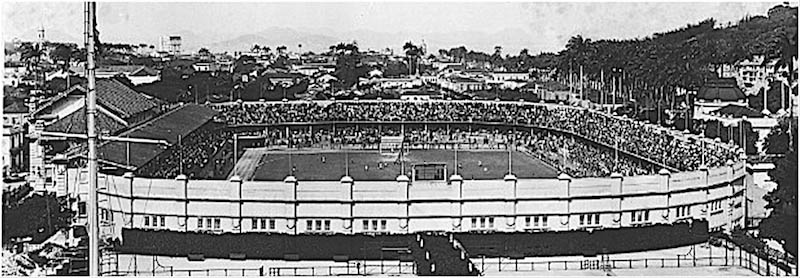

== Summary ==
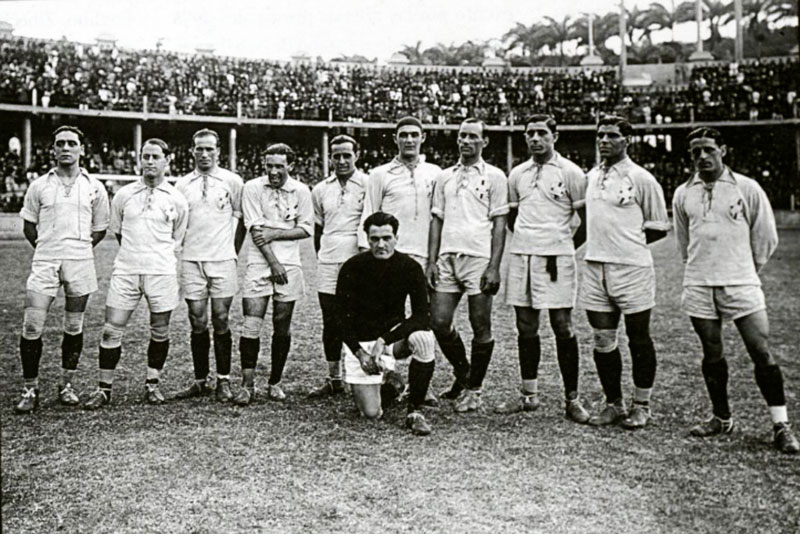
The Brazilian squad, champions

The competition began on 17 September when hosts Brazil drew 1–1 with Chile. Six days later, Uruguay defeated Chile 2–0. On 24 September, Brazil again drew 1–1 – this time with Paraguay. Four days later, defending champions Argentina defeated Chile 4–0. On 1 October, Brazil and Uruguay played out a goalless draw. With half the games played, Brazil and Uruguay were tied at the top of the table with three points, one point ahead of Argentina who had three games still to play.

On 5 October, Paraguay defeated Chile 3–0 to move level on points with Brazil and Uruguay. Two days later, Uruguay defeated Argentina 1–0 to move two points clear at the top. On 12 October, Paraguay defeated Uruguay 1–0 to move level on points with Uruguay at the top of the table. However, Uruguay were angered by what they saw as a dreadful performance by referee Carlos Santos. Three days later, Brazil defeated Argentina 2–0 which left a three-way tie for the top of the group but Paraguay still had one match to play. In the final match on 18 October, Paraguay lost 2–0 to Argentina which meant Brazil, Paraguay and Uruguay were all tied for first place.

A series of play-offs was set to be organised to decide the winners but Uruguay withdrew citing the poor performance of the referee in their loss to Paraguay. As a result, Brazil and Paraguay played-off for the title on 6 November. Goals from Neco and Xavier Camargo saw Brazil win the title after defeating Paraguay 3–0.

== Table ==
Pos	Team	Pld	W	D	L	GF	GA	GD	Pts	Qualification
1	Brazil	4	1	3	0	4	2	+2	5	Qualification for play-off
1	Paraguay	4	2	1	1	5	3	+2	5	Qualification for play-off
1	Uruguay	4	2	1	1	3	1	+2	5	Qualification for play-off
4	Argentina	4	2	0	2	6	3	+3	4	
5	Chile	4	0	1	3	1	10	−9	1	

== Results ==
17 September 1922

Brazil	1–1	Chile
Tatú 9'		Bravo 41'

Estádio de Laranjeiras, Rio de Janeiro
Referee: Ricardo Vallarino (Uruguay)

23 September 1922

Chile	0–2	Uruguay
		Heguy 10'; Urdinarán 19' (pen.)

Estádio de Laranjeiras, Rio de Janeiro
Referee: Francisco Andreu (Paraguay)

24 September 1922

Brazil	1–1	Paraguay
Amílcar 14'		Rivas 71'

Estádio de Laranjeiras, Rio de Janeiro
Referee: Norberto Ladrón de Guevara (Chile)

28 September 1922

Argentina	4–0	Chile
Chiessa 10'; Francia 36', 41'; Gaslini 75'

Estádio de Laranjeiras, Rio de Janeiro
Referee: Ricardo Vallarino (Uruguay)

1 October 1922

Brazil	0–0	Uruguay

Estádio de Laranjeiras, Rio de Janeiro
Referee: Servando Pérez (Argentina)

5 October 1922

Paraguay	3–0	Chile
Ramírez 5'; López 78'; Fretes 86'

Estádio de Laranjeiras, Rio de Janeiro
Referee: Servando Pérez (Argentina)

8 October 1922

Uruguay	1–0	Argentina
Buffoni 43'

Estádio de Laranjeiras, Rio de Janeiro
Referee: Pedro Santos (Brazil)

12 October 1922

Uruguay	0–1	Paraguay
		Elizeche 7'

Estádio de Laranjeiras, Rio de Janeiro
Referee: Pedro Santos (Brazil)

15 October 1922

Brazil	2–0	Argentina
Neco 42'; Amílcar 86' (pen.)

Estádio de Laranjeiras, Rio de Janeiro
Referee: Francisco Andreu (Paraguay)

18 October 1922

Paraguay	0–2 (abandoned)	Argentina
		Francia 63', 79' (pen.)

Estádio de Laranjeiras, Rio de Janeiro
Referee: Enrique Vignal (Brazil)

=== Play-off ===
6 November 1922

Brazil	3–0	Paraguay
Neco 11'; Formiga 48', 89'

Estádio de Laranjeiras, Rio de Janeiro
Referee: Servando Pérez (Argentina)

== Goalscorers ==
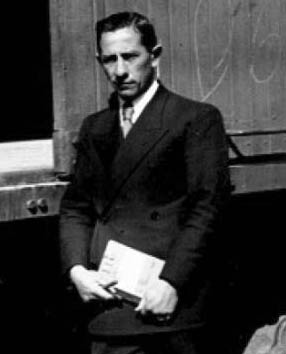
Juan Francia, top scorer

There were 22 goals scored in 11 matches, for an average of 2 goals per match.

4 goals

- (Argentina) Juan Francia

2 goals

- (Brazil) Amilcar
- (Brazil) Formiga
- (Brazil) Neco

1 goal

- (Argentina) Ángel Chiessa
- (Argentina) José Gaslini
- (Brazil) Tatú
- (Chile) Manuel Bravo
- (Paraguay) Carlos Elizeche
- (Paraguay) Luis Fretes
- (Paraguay) Ildefonso López
- (Paraguay) Julio Ramírez
- (Paraguay) Gerardo Rivas
- (Uruguay) Felipe Buffoni
- (Uruguay) Juan C. Heguy
- (Uruguay) Antonio Urdinarán
