= 1927 Campeonato Paulista =

The 1927 Campeonato Paulista was the 26th season of São Paulo's top association football league. Two championships were disputed that season, each by a different league (APEA and LAF).

== LAF Championship ==
Campeonato Paulista (LAF)
- Season: 1927
- Champions: Paulistano (10th title)
- Top goalscorer: Friedenreich (Paulistano) – 13 goals

In the edition organized by the LAF (Liga dos Amadores de Futebol), from 3 April to 30 October. Paulistano won the title for the 10th time. no teams were relegated. The top scorer was Friedenreich with 13 goals.

=== System ===
The championship was disputed in a single round-robin system, with the team with the most points winning the title.

=== Championship ===
| Pos | Team | Pld | W | D | L | GF | GA | GD | Pts | Qualification or relegation |
|---|---|---|---|---|---|---|---|---|---|---|
| 1 | Paulistano | 9 | 6 | 3 | 0 | 30 | 7 | +23 | 15 | Champions |
| 2 | Hespanha | 9 | 6 | 1 | 2 | 23 | 16 | +7 | 13 | |
| 3 | AA São Bento | 9 | 5 | 1 | 3 | 17 | 11 | +6 | 11 | |
| 4 | Paulista | 9 | 5 | 1 | 3 | 24 | 20 | +4 | 11 | |
| 5 | Germânia | 9 | 4 | 2 | 3 | 25 | 22 | +3 | 10 | |
| 6 | AA das Palmeiras | 9 | 3 | 2 | 4 | 15 | 23 | −8 | 8 | |
| 7 | SC Internacional | 9 | 3 | 1 | 5 | 16 | 20 | −4 | 7 | |
| 8 | Atlético Santista | 9 | 2 | 1 | 6 | 17 | 18 | −1 | 5 | |
| 9 | Antarctica | 9 | 2 | 1 | 6 | 16 | 33 | −17 | 5 | |
| 10 | Sant'Anna | 9 | 2 | 1 | 6 | 8 | 21 | −13 | 5 | |
| 11 | Taubaté | 0 | 0 | 0 | 0 | 0 | 0 | 0 | 0 | Withdrew |
| 12 | Corinthians | 0 | 0 | 0 | 0 | 0 | 0 | 0 | 0 | Withdrew |
| 13 | Sílex | 0 | 0 | 0 | 0 | 0 | 0 | 0 | 0 | Withdrew |
| 14 | Independência | 0 | 0 | 0 | 0 | 0 | 0 | 0 | 0 | Withdrew |
| 15 | Sírio | 0 | 0 | 0 | 0 | 0 | 0 | 0 | 0 | Withdrew |

Updated to match(es) played on 29 May 2022. Source: RSSSF.com
Rules for classification: 1) points; 2) goal difference; 3) wins; 4) head-to-head points.

== APEA Championship ==
Campeonato Paulista (APEA)
- Season: 1927
- Champions: Palestra Itália (3rd title)
- Top goalscorer: Araken (Santos) – 31 goals

In the edition organized by the APEA (Associação Paulista de Esportes Atléticos) from 3 March 1927 to 11 March 1928. Palestra Itália won the title for the 3rd time. no teams were relegated and the top scorer was Araken with 31 goals.

=== System ===
The championship was disputed in a single round-robin system, with the team with the most points winning the title.

=== Championship ===
| Pos | Team | Pld | W | D | L | GF | GA | GD | Pts | Qualification or relegation |
|---|---|---|---|---|---|---|---|---|---|---|
| 1 | Palestra Itália | 16 | 14 | 1 | 1 | 89 | 22 | +67 | 29 | Champions |
| 2 | Santos | 16 | 14 | 0 | 2 | 100 | 33 | +67 | 28 | |
| 3 | Corinthians | 16 | 12 | 0 | 4 | 60 | 32 | +28 | 24 | |
| 4 | Guarani | 16 | 9 | 1 | 6 | 55 | 42 | +13 | 19 | |
| 5 | Portuguesa | 13 | 7 | 0 | 6 | 43 | 44 | −1 | 14 | |
| 6 | São Paulo Alpargatas | 13 | 6 | 1 | 6 | 34 | 41 | −7 | 13 | |
| 7 | República | 13 | 6 | 1 | 6 | 29 | 39 | −10 | 13 | |
| 8 | Comercial (RP) | 11 | 4 | 0 | 7 | 13 | 22 | −9 | 8 | |
| 9 | Sílex | 13 | 4 | 1 | 8 | 26 | 32 | −6 | 9 | |
| 10 | Primeiro de Maio | 12 | 3 | 0 | 9 | 29 | 43 | −14 | 6 | |
| 11 | Barra Funda | 13 | 3 | 1 | 9 | 12 | 40 | −28 | 7 | |
| 12 | Auto/Audax | 13 | 3 | 1 | 9 | 17 | 48 | −31 | 7 | |
| 13 | Corinthians (SBC) | 13 | 3 | 1 | 9 | 20 | 43 | −23 | 7 | |
| 14 | Ypiranga | 12 | 2 | 0 | 10 | 19 | 65 | −46 | 4 | |

Updated to match(es) played on May 29, 2022. Source: RSSSF.com
Rules for classification: 1) points; 2) goal difference; 3) wins; 4) head-to-head points.

== Top Scorers ==
| Rank | Player | Club | Goals |
|---|---|---|---|
| 1 | Araken | Santos | 31 |
| 2 | Feitiço | Santos | 28 |
| 3 | Heitor | Palestra Itália | 22 |
| 4 | De Maria | Corinthians | 19 |
| 5 | Tedesco | Palestra Itália | 14 |
| 5 | Lara | Palestra Itália | 14 |
| 7 | Camarão | Santos | 13 |
| 8 | Roberto Caco | Guarani | 11 |
| 9 | Salles | Portuguesa | 11 |
| 10 | Nenê | Guarani | 10 |
