= 1952 São Paulo FC season =

São Paulo
1952 season
- Chairman: Cícero Pompeu de Toledo
- Manager: Vicente Feola
- Torneio Rio-São Paulo: 7th
- Campeonato Paulista: Runners-up

The 1952 football season was São Paulo's 23rd season since the club's founding in 1930.

== Overall ==
Games played	69 (9 Torneio Rio-São Paulo, 30 Campeonato Paulista, 30 Friendly match)
Games won	43 (3 Torneio Rio-São Paulo, 21 Campeonato Paulista, 19 Friendly match)
Games drawn	12 (2 Torneio Rio-São Paulo, 4 Campeonato Paulista, 6 Friendly match)
Games lost	14 (4 Torneio Rio-São Paulo, 5 Campeonato Paulista, 5 Friendly match)
Goals scored	149
Goals conceded	81
Goal difference	+68
Best result	5–0 (A) v Juventus - Friendly match - 1952.04.20; 5–0 (H) v Portuguesa Santista - Campeonato Paulista - 1952.09.28
Worst result	0–4 (A) v Fluminense - Torneio Rio-São Paulo - 1952.03.22; 0–4 (A) v XV de Piracicaba - Friendly match - 1952.03.30; 0–4 (H) v XV de Jaú - Campeonato Paulista - 1952.10.08
Most appearances	
Top scorer	

Source: São Paulo FC

== Friendlies ==
January 6 National	Paulista	1–3	São Paulo	Jundiaí
	Goal		Goal	Stadium: Campo da Vila Leme

March 30 National	XV de Piracicaba	4–0	São Paulo	Piracicaba
	Goal			Stadium: Rua Regente Feijó

April 6 National	XV de Jaú	1–2	São Paulo	Jaú
	Goal		Goal	Stadium: Artur Simões

April 13 National	Botafogo	1–2	São Paulo	Ribeirão Preto
	Goal		Goal	Stadium: Estádio Luís Pereira (Vila Tibério)

April 20 National	Juventus	0–5	São Paulo	São Paulo
			Goal	Stadium: Estádio Conde Rodolfo Crespi (Rua Javari)

April 21 National	Corinthians de Santo André	4–2	São Paulo	Santo André
	Goal		Goal	Stadium: Estádio Américo Guazzelli

April 27 National	Linense	3–2	São Paulo	Lins
	Goal		Goal

May 1 National	Nacional	1–3	São Paulo	São Paulo
	Goal		Goal	Stadium: Estádio Conde Rodolfo Crespi (Rua Javari)

May 4 National	Inter de Bebedouro	1–4	São Paulo	Bebedouro
	Goal		Goal

May 16 National	São Paulo	3–0	Atlético Paranaense	São Paulo
	Goal			Stadium: Estádio Palestra Itália (Parque Antarctica)

May 22 National	Corinthians de Santo André	2–3	São Paulo	Santo André
	Goal		Goal	Stadium: Estádio Américo Guazzelli

May 22 National	Ypiranga	0–0	São Paulo	São Paulo
				Stadium: Estádio Conde Rodolfo Crespi (Rua Javari)

May 25 National	Garça	1–1	São Paulo	Garça
	Goal		Goal

June 3 National	São Paulo	0–1	Santos	São Paulo
			Goal	Stadium: Estádio Paulo Machado de Carvalho (Pacaembu)

June 7 National	Santos	0–2	São Paulo	Santos
			Goal	Stadium: Estádio Urbano Caldeira (Vila Belmiro)

June 12 National	São Paulo	4–2	America-RJ	São Paulo
	Goal		Goal	Stadium: Estádio Paulo Machado de Carvalho (Pacaembu)

June 15 National	Botafogo	0–2	São Paulo	Ribeirão Preto
			Goal	Stadium: Estádio Luís Pereira (Vila Tibério)

June 22 National	Corinthians de Santo André	1–3	São Paulo	Santo André
	Goal		Goal	Stadium: Estádio Américo Guazzelli

June 24 National	Inter de Bebedouro	1–2	São Paulo	Bebedouro
	Goal		Goal

June 29 Quadrangular Paulista	São Paulo	3–0	Corinthians	São Paulo
	Goal			Stadium: Estádio Paulo Machado de Carvalho (Pacaembu)

July 2 Quadrangular Paulista	Palmeiras	1–0	São Paulo	São Paulo
	Goal			Stadium: Estádio Paulo Machado de Carvalho (Pacaembu)

July 5 Quadrangular Paulista	Portuguesa	1–3	São Paulo	São Paulo
	Goal		Goal	Stadium: Estádio Paulo Machado de Carvalho (Pacaembu)

July 9 National	Bauru	1–1	São Paulo	Bauru
	Goal		Goal	Stadium: Estádio Paulo Machado de Carvalho (Pacaembu)

July 13 National	Ponte Preta	2–2	São Paulo	Campinas
	Goal		Goal	Stadium: Estádio Moisés Lucarelli

July 20 National	Ourinhense	0–4	São Paulo	Ourinhos
			Goal

July 27 National	São Paulo (Araçatuba)	1–1	São Paulo	Araçatuba
	Goal		Goal

July 30 Taça Santos	Santos	0–1	São Paulo	Santos
			Goal	Stadium: Estádio Urbano Caldeira (Vila Belmiro)

August 3 Quadrangular Rio-SP	São Paulo	4–1	Flamengo	São Paulo
	Goal		Goal	Stadium: Estádio Paulo Machado de Carvalho (Pacaembu)

August 10 Quadrangular Rio-SP	São Paulo	4–0	Vasco da Gama	São Paulo
	Goal			Stadium: Estádio Paulo Machado de Carvalho (Pacaembu)

August 15 Quadrangular Rio-SP	Palmeiras	1–1	São Paulo	São Paulo
	Goal		Goal	Stadium: Estádio Paulo Machado de Carvalho (Pacaembu)

== Official competitions ==
=== Torneio Rio-São Paulo ===
February 6 1	São Paulo	1–2	Corinthians	São Paulo
	Goal		Goal	Stadium: Estádio Paulo Machado de Carvalho (Pacaembu)

February 10 2	Bangu	2–2	São Paulo	Rio de Janeiro
	Goal		Goal	Stadium: Estádio Municipal do Rio de Janeiro (Maracanã)

February 17 3	São Paulo	2–0	Botafogo	São Paulo
	Goal			Stadium: Estádio Paulo Machado de Carvalho (Pacaembu)

March 2 4	São Paulo	2–3	Vasco da Gama	São Paulo
	Goal		Goal	Stadium: Estádio Paulo Machado de Carvalho (Pacaembu)

March 9 5	Flamengo	2–3	São Paulo	Rio de Janeiro
	Goal		Goal	Stadium: Estádio Municipal do Rio de Janeiro (Maracanã)

March 12 6	São Paulo	1–1	Palmeiras	São Paulo
	Goal		Goal	Stadium: Estádio Paulo Machado de Carvalho (Pacaembu)

March 19 7	São Paulo	3–2	Portuguesa	São Paulo
	Goal		Goal	Stadium: Estádio Paulo Machado de Carvalho (Pacaembu)

March 22 8	Fluminense	4–0	São Paulo	Rio de Janeiro
	Goal			Stadium: Estádio Municipal do Rio de Janeiro (Maracanã)

March 26 9	Santos	2–1	São Paulo	São Paulo
	Goal		Goal	Stadium: Estádio Paulo Machado de Carvalho (Pacaembu)

==== Record ====
Final Position	Points	Matches	Wins	Draws	Losses	Goals For	Goals Away	Win%
7th	8	9	3	2	4	15	18	44%

=== Campeonato Paulista ===
August 31 1	São Paulo	3–1	Nacional	São Paulo
	Goal		Goal	Stadium: Estádio Paulo Machado de Carvalho (Pacaembu)

September 3 2	São Paulo	2–1	Juventus	São Paulo
	Goal		Goal	Stadium: Estádio Paulo Machado de Carvalho (Pacaembu)

September 7 3	Radium	0–2	São Paulo	Mococa
			Goal

September 14 4	São Paulo	5–2	Comercial	São Paulo
	Goal		Goal	Stadium: Estádio Paulo Machado de Carvalho (Pacaembu)

September 21 5	Guarani	1–3	São Paulo	Campinas
	Goal		Goal	Stadium: Rua Barão Geraldo de Resende

September 28 6	São Paulo	5–0	Portuguesa Santista	São Paulo
	Goal			Stadium: Estádio Paulo Machado de Carvalho (Pacaembu)

October 5 7	XV de Piracicaba	0–0	São Paulo	Piracicaba
				Stadium: Rua Regente Feijó

October 8 8	São Paulo	0–4	XV de Jaú	São Paulo
			Goal	Stadium: Estádio Paulo Machado de Carvalho (Pacaembu)

October 12 9	Palmeiras	1–2	São Paulo	São Paulo
	Goal		Goal	Stadium: Estádio Paulo Machado de Carvalho (Pacaembu)

October 8 10	São Paulo	3–1	Jabaquara	São Paulo
	Goal		Goal	Stadium: Estádio Paulo Machado de Carvalho (Pacaembu)

October 22 11	São Paulo	4–2	Ponte Preta	São Paulo
	Goal		Goal	Stadium: Estádio Paulo Machado de Carvalho (Pacaembu)

October 26 12	Santos	0–3	São Paulo	Santos
			Goal	Stadium: Estádio Urbano Caldeira (Vila Belmiro)

November 1 13	Ypiranga	1–3	São Paulo	São Paulo
	Goal		Goal	Stadium: Estádio Paulo Machado de Carvalho (Pacaembu)

November 9 14	São Paulo	1–0	Portuguesa	São Paulo
	Goal			Stadium: Estádio Paulo Machado de Carvalho (Pacaembu)

November 16 15	São Paulo	1–2	Corinthians	São Paulo
	Goal		Goal	Stadium: Estádio Paulo Machado de Carvalho (Pacaembu)

November 23 16	Portuguesa Santista	1–2	São Paulo	Santos
	Goal		Goal	Stadium: Estádio Ulrico Mursa

November 26 17	São Paulo	1–1	Comercial	São Paulo
	Goal		Goal	Stadium: Estádio Paulo Machado de Carvalho (Pacaembu)

November 30 18	São Paulo	1–0	Ypiranga	São Paulo
	Goal			Stadium: Estádio Paulo Machado de Carvalho (Pacaembu)

December 7 19	Ponte Preta	2–4	São Paulo	Campinas
	Goal		Goal	Stadium: Estádio Moisés Lucarelli

December 14 20	Juventus	2–0	São Paulo	São Paulo
	Goal			Stadium: Estádio Paulo Machado de Carvalho (Pacaembu)

December 17 21	São Paulo	5–2	XV de Piracicaba	São Paulo
	Goal		Goal	Stadium: Estádio Paulo Machado de Carvalho (Pacaembu)

December 21 22	XV de Jaú	0–2	São Paulo	Jaú
			Goal	Stadium: Artur Simões

December 28 23	São Paulo	2–2	Palmeiras	São Paulo
	Goal		Goal	Stadium: Estádio Paulo Machado de Carvalho (Pacaembu)

January 4, 1953 24	Jabaquara	0–2	São Paulo	Santos
			Goal	Stadium: Estádio Ulrico Mursa

January 7, 1953 25	São Paulo	2–0	Radium	São Paulo
	Goal			Stadium: Estádio Paulo Machado de Carvalho (Pacaembu)

January 10, 1953 26	São Paulo	4–0	Guarani	São Paulo
	Goal			Stadium: Estádio Paulo Machado de Carvalho (Pacaembu)

January 15, 1953 27	São Paulo	1–0	Santos	São Paulo
	Goal			Stadium: Estádio Paulo Machado de Carvalho (Pacaembu)

January 18, 1953 28	Nacional	1–1	São Paulo	São Paulo
	Goal		Goal	Stadium: Estádio Nicolau Alayon (Comendador Sousa)

January 25, 1953 29	Portuguesa	1–0	São Paulo	São Paulo
	Goal			Stadium: Estádio Paulo Machado de Carvalho (Pacaembu)

February 1, 1953 30	Corinthians	3–2	São Paulo	São Paulo
	Goal		Goal	Stadium: Estádio Paulo Machado de Carvalho (Pacaembu)

==== Record ====
Final Position	Points	Matches	Wins	Draws	Losses	Goals For	Goals Away	Win%
2nd	46	30	21	4	5	66	31	76%
