= 1931 Campeonato Paulista =

Campeonato Paulista
- Season: 1931
- Champions: São Paulo
- Matches played: 182
- Goals scored: 781 (4.29 per match)
- Top goalscorer: Feitiço (Santos) – 39 goals
- Biggest home win: Santos 11–0 América (December 27, 1931)
- Biggest away win: Germânia 0-7 Palestra Itália (September 27, 1931); Juventus 1-8 São Paulo (November 22, 1931); Germânia 0–7 Portuguesa (November 29, 1931)
- Highest scoring: Palestra Itália 8–2 América (May 24, 1931)

The 1931 Campeonato Paulista, organized by the APEA (Associação Paulista de Esportes Atléticos), was the 30th season of São Paulo's top association football league. São Paulo won the title for the 1st time. No teams were relegated. The top scorer was Feitiço, from Santos, with 39 goals.

== System ==
The championship was disputed in a double-round robin system, with the team with the most points winning the title.

== Championship ==
Pos	Team	Pld	W	D	L	GF	GA	GD	Pts	Qualification or relegation
1	São Paulo	26	20	5	1	92	30	+62	45	Champions
2	Palestra Itália	26	21	1	4	84	35	+49	43	
3	Santos	26	18	6	2	79	28	+51	42 (Note: Portuguesa and Santos refused to play their away matches against Atlético Santista. the matches were counted as walkovers for Atlético Santista.)	
4	Atlético Santista	26	14	7	5	66	44	+22	35	
5	Portuguesa	26	14	4	8	55	35	+20	32	
6	Corinthians	26	11	8	7	66	47	+19	30	
7	Guarani	26	11	4	11	54	49	+5	26	
8	Juventus	26	10	3	13	47	64	−17	23	
9	Sírio	26	10	2	14	60	56	+4	22	
10	Internacional	26	7	5	14	35	51	−16	19	
11	São Bento	26	4	6	16	45	74	−29	14	
12	América	26	5	2	19	32	95	−63	12	
13	Ypiranga	26	4	3	19	31	82	−51	11	
14	Germânia	26	4	2	20	35	91	−56	10	

Updated to match(es) played on January 10, 1932. Source: RSSSF.com
Rules for classification: 1) points; 2) goal difference; 3) wins; 4) head-to-head points.

== Top Scorers ==
Rank	Player	Club	Goals
1	Feitiço	Santos	39
2	Arthur Friedenreich	São Paulo	31
3	Heitor	Palestra Itália	18
4	Romeu	Palestra Itália	17
5	Araken	São Paulo	16
5	Osses	Palestra Itália	16
5	Paschoalino	Portuguesa	16
8	Luisinho	São Paulo	15
8	Armandinho	São Paulo	15
10	Guimarães	Corinthians	12
10	Salles	Portuguesa	12
11	Nenê	Guaraní	11
