= 1931 São Paulo FC season =

São Paulo
1931 season
- Chairman: Edgard de Souza Aranha
- Manager: Rubens Sales
- Campeonato Paulista: Champions (1st title)

The 1931 season was the second competitive season of São Paulo Futebol Clube. In this season, only one year after its debut São Paulo won its first official title with an impressive performance at the Campeonato Paulista with over 20 wins. Rubens Salles, a former player from Club Athletico Paulistano, became the first champion manager in the history of São Paulo FC, after a runners-up performance reached in previous year.

== Overall ==
Games played	31 (26 Campeonato Paulista, 5 Friendly match)
Games won	22 (20 Campeonato Paulista, 2 Friendly match)
Games drawn	7 (5 Campeonato Paulista, 2 Friendly match)
Games lost	2 (1 Campeonato Paulista, 1 Friendly match)
Goals scored	105
Goals conceded	37
Goal difference	+68
Best result	8–1 (H) v América - Campeonato Paulista - 1931.6.21; 8–1 (A) v Juventus - Campeonato Paulista - 1931.11.22
Worst result	2–3 (A) v Palestra Itália - Campeonato Paulista - 1931.5.1
Top scorer	

Source: São Paulo FC

== Friendlies ==
March 14 National friendly	São Paulo	5–1	Vasco da Gama	São Paulo
21:50 (UTC-3)	Friedenreich 27', 57', 72'; Biba 49'; Luizinho 80'		17'	Stadium: Chácara da Floresta; Referee: Carlos Strobel

September 6 Isidoro Lopes Trophy	São Paulo	2–2	Palestra Itália	São Paulo
	Friedenreich; Junqueirinha		Goal	Stadium: Chácara da Floresta; Referee: Domingos Olmos

=== Esporte Clube Sírio Birthday Festival ===
July 14 National friendly	São Paulo	1–2	Sírio	São Paulo
	Serrote		Goal	Stadium: Chácara da Floresta; Referee: Joaquim Teodoro Bentes

=== APEA Festival ===
August 2 National friendly	São Paulo	3–0	Sírio	São Paulo
	Biba; Jahú; Coelho			Stadium: Chácara da Floresta; Referee: Theophilio Osses

=== CA Brasil Festival ===
August 18 National friendly	São Paulo	2–2	Portuguesa	São Paulo
	Rodarte; Biba		Goal	Stadium: Chácara da Floresta; Referee: Raimundo Ferreira

== Official competitions ==
=== Campeonato Paulista ===
March 29 Round 1	Santos	2–2	São Paulo	Santos
	Victor; Feitiço		Luizinho; Armandinho	Stadium: Estádio Urbano Caldeira (Vila Belmiro); Referee: Carlos Rusticcelli (ht) / Venceslau de Souza (ft)

April 12 Round 2	São Paulo	3–1	Internacional	São Paulo
	Armandinho; Friedenreich,		Del Bianco	Stadium: Chácara da Floresta; Referee: Luiz Felizatti

May 1 Round 3	Palestra Itália	3–2	São Paulo	São Paulo
	Aldo 28', Heitor (pen.)		Friedenreich 15'; Armandinho 25'	Stadium: Estádio Palestra Itália (Parque Antarctica); Referee: Thomaz Ciccarelli

May 10 Round 4	São Paulo	2–2	Guarani	São Paulo
	Friedenreich 3'; Araken 38'		Coelho 29'; Nene 62'	Stadium: Chácara da Floresta; Referee: Thomaz Ciccarelli

May 16 Round 5	São Paulo	4–1	Germânia	São Paulo
	Friedenreich 20', 37', 70'; Araken 55'		Sttafen 4'	Stadium: Chácara da Floresta; Referee: Domingos Nicolellis (ht) / Manoel Pinto Jr (ft)

May 24 Round 6	São Bento	2–4	São Paulo	São Paulo
	Amleto 35'; Caetano 75'		Siriri 15'; Armandinho 20'; Friedenreich 62'; Luizinho 78'	Stadium: Ponte Grande; Referee: Carlos Strobel

May 31 Round 7	São Paulo	3–1	Juventus	São Paulo
	Friedenreich; Friedenreich; Friedenreich		Euvaldo	Stadium: Chácara da Floresta

June 7 Round 8	São Paulo	2–0	Ypiranga	São Paulo
	Siriri; Araken			Stadium: Chácara da Floresta

June 14 Round 9	São Paulo	3–3	Atlético Santista	São Paulo
	Armandinho; Friedenreich; Friedenreich		Silesio; Bahianinho; Tedesco	Stadium: Chácara da Floresta

June 21 Round 10	São Paulo	8–1	América	São Paulo
	Friedenreich; Friedenreich; Armandinho; Armandinho; Araken; Siriri; Luizinho; Primo (o.g.)		Sandro	Stadium: Chácara da Floresta

June 28 Round 11	São Paulo	2–2	Corinthians	São Paulo
	Emílio Armiñana; Friedenreich		Ratto; De Maria	Stadium: Chácara da Floresta

September 20 Round 12	São Paulo	5–1	Sírio	São Paulo
	Friedenreich; Friedenreich; Luizinho; Luizinho; Siriri		Caetano	Stadium: Chácara da Floresta

September 27 Round 13	São Paulo	2–1	Portuguesa	São Paulo
	Luiz; Barthô		Machado	Stadium: Chácara da Floresta

October 18 Round 14	São Paulo	6–0	Ypiranga	São Paulo
	Friedenreich; Araken; Siriri; Siriri; Luizinho; Luizinho			Stadium: Chácara da Floresta

October 25 Round 15	São Paulo	4–2	Santos	São Paulo
	Friedenreich; Friedenreich; Siriri; Araken		Feitiço; Evangelista	Stadium: Chácara da Floresta

October 31 Round 16	São Paulo	2–0	Internacional	São Paulo
	Junqueira; Friedenreich			Stadium: Chácara da Floresta

November 8 Round 17	São Paulo	7–0	América	São Paulo
	Friedenreich; Siriri; Luizinho; Fabio; Araken			Stadium: Chácara da Floresta

November 15 Round 18	Portuguesa	1–3	São Paulo	São Paulo
	Machado		Armandinho; Luizinho; Friedenreich	Stadium: Rua Cesário Ramalho

November 22 Round 19	Juventus	1–8	São Paulo	São Paulo
	Piccinin		Friedenreich; Friedenreich; Armandinho; Armandinho; Luizinho; Luizinho; Luizinho; Araken	Stadium: Rua Javari

November 29 Round 20	Atlético Santista	1–1	São Paulo	Santos
	Xavier		Junqueira	Stadium: Avenida Conselheiro Nébias

December 6 Round 21	São Paulo	4–0	Palestra Itália	São Paulo
	Armandinho; Armandinho; Armandinho; Araken			Stadium: Chácara da Floresta

December 13 Round 22	Guarani	0–2	São Paulo	Campinas
			Araken; Friedenreich	Stadium: Guanabara

December 20 Round 23	Germânia	1–3	São Paulo	São Paulo
	Nenê		Friedenreich; Milton; Armandinho	Stadium: Chácara da Floresta

December 27 Round 24	São Bento	2–4	São Paulo	São Paulo
	Caetano; Caetano		Friedenreich; Friedenreich; Friedenreich; Friedenreich	Stadium: Ponte Grande

January 3, 1932 Round 25	São Paulo	2–1	Sírio	São Paulo
	Junqueira; Araken		Vicente	Stadium: Chácara da Floresta

January 10, 1932 Round 26	Corinthians	1–4	São Paulo	São Paulo
	Guimarães 47'		Armandinho 10', 25'; Friedenreich 23'; Araken 64'	Stadium: Parque São Jorge; Attendance: 20,222; Referee: Virgilio Friedrighi

==== Record ====
Final Position	Points	Matches	Wins	Draws	Losses	Goals For	Goals Away	Win%
1st	45	26	20	5	1	92	30	86%
