= Campeonato Paulista Série A2 =

Football championship in Brazil

Campeonato Paulista - Série A2
- Organising body: FPF
- Founded: 1916; 110 years ago
- Country: Brazil
- State: (São Paulo (state)) São Paulo
- Level on pyramid: 2
- Promotion to: Série A1
- Relegation to: Série A3
- Domestic cup(s): Copa Paulista; Copa do Brasil
- Current champions: Juventus-SP (3rd) (2026)
- Most championships: XV de Piracicaba; Taubaté (6 titles)
- Broadcaster: SporTV
- Website: FPF Official website

Campeonato Paulista Série A2 is the second tier of the professional state football league in the Brazilian state of São Paulo. It is run by the São Paulo State Football Federation (FPF).

== Clubs ==
2026 Série A2

Team	City	Ground	2025 result
Água Santa	Diadema	Arena Inamar	15th (Série A1)
Ferroviária	Araraquara	Fonte Luminosa	5th
Grêmio Prudente	Presidente Prudente	Prudentão	9th
Inter de Limeira	Limeira	Major José Levy Sobrinho	16th (Série A1)
Ituano	Itu	Novelli Júnior	3rd
Juventus	São Paulo (Mooca)	Rua Javari	11th
Linense	Lins	Gilbertão	12th
Monte Azul	Monte Azul Paulista	Ninho do Azulão	2nd (Série A3)
Osasco Sporting	Osasco	Municipal José Liberatti	10th
Santo André	Santo André	Bruno José Daniel	8th
São Bento	Sorocaba	CIC Walter Ribeiro	14th
São José	São José dos Campos	Martins Pereira	7th
Sertãozinho	Sertãozinho	Frederico Dalmaso	1st (Série A3)
Taubaté	Taubaté	Joaquinzão	4th
Votuporanguense	Votuporanga	Plínio Marin	13th
XV de Piracicaba	Piracicaba	Barão da Serra Negra	6th

== List of champions ==
There are all the championship editions, officially recognized by Federação Paulista de Futebol.

Year	Edition	Federation	Champion	City	Runners-up	City
1916	1	LPF	União Brasil	São Paulo	Antarctica	São Paulo
1917	2	APEA	Minas Gerais	São Paulo	União Fluminense	São Paulo
1918	3	APEA (Capital)	União Fluminense	São Paulo	União Brasil	São Paulo
1918	3	APEA (Countryside)	Taubaté	Taubaté	Comercial	Ribeirão Preto
1919	4	APEA (Capital)	União Fluminense	São Paulo	Ruggerone	São Paulo
1919	4	APEA (Countryside)	Paulista	Jundiaí	XV de Piracicaba	Piracicaba
1920	5	APEA (Capital)	Sírio	São Paulo	União Cambucy	São Paulo
1920	5	APEA (Countryside)	Corinthians	Jundiaí	Sanjoanense	São João da Boa Vista
1921	6	APEA (Capital)	Independência	São Paulo	Associação Graphica	São Paulo
1921	6	APEA (Countryside)	Paulista	Jundiaí	Comercial	Ribeirão Preto
1922	7	APEA (Capital)	Associação Graphica	São Paulo	Siléx	São Paulo
1922	7	APEA (Countryside)	Rio Branco	Americana	Sanjoanense	São João da Boa Vista
1923	8	APEA (Capital)	Audax	São Paulo	Independência	São Paulo
1923	8	APEA (Countryside)	Rio Branco	Americana	Sorocabano	Sorocaba
1924	9	APEA (Capital)	Independência	São Paulo	Siléx	São Paulo
1925	10	APEA (Capital)	Siléx	São Paulo	Primeiro de Maio	Santo André
1925	10	APEA (Countryside)	Velo Clube	Rio Claro	Sorocabano	Sorocaba
1926	11	APEA (Capital)	Primeiro de Maio	Santo André	República	São Paulo
1926	11	APEA (Countryside)	Elvira	Jacareí	XV de Jaú	Jaú
1926	11	LAF (Capital)	Sant'Anna	São Paulo	União Lapa	São Paulo
1926	11	LAF (Countryside)	Taubaté	Taubaté	EC Lemense	Leme
1927	12	APEA (Capital)	Voluntários da Pátria	São Paulo	Cotonifício Rodolfo Crespi	São Paulo
1927	12	APEA (Countryside)	Botafogo	Ribeirão Preto	Savóia	Sorocaba
1927	12	LAF (Capital)	União Lapa	São Paulo	União Fluminense	São Paulo
1927	12	LAF (Countryside)	Ponte Preta	Campinas	Hepacaré	Lorena
1927	12	LAF (Santos)	Hespanha	Santos	Glorioso	Santos
1928	13	APEA (Capital)	Siléx	São Paulo	República	São Paulo
1928	13	APEA (Countryside)	São Caetano EC	São Caetano do Sul	Botafogo	Ribeirão Preto
1928	13	LAF (Capital)	União Fluminense	São Paulo	São Geraldo	São Paulo
1928	13	LAF (Countryside)	Amparo	Amparo	EC Itapira	Itapira
1928	13	LAF (Countryside)	Rio Claro	Rio Claro	Inter de Limeira	Limeira
1928	13	LAF (Countryside)	Taubaté	Taubaté	Cachoeira FC	Cachoeira Paulista
1928	13	LAF (Santos)	Brasil FC	Santos	Hespanha Extra	Santos
1929	14	APEA (Capital)	Cotonifício Rodolfo Crespi	São Paulo	República	São Paulo
1929	14	APEA (Countryside)	Floresta	Amparo	Ipiranga	Jundiaí
1929	14	LAF (Capital)	São Geraldo	São Paulo	União Vasco da Gama	São Paulo
1929	14	LAF (Countryside)	Rio Claro	Rio Claro	AA Pinhalense	Espírito Santo do Pinhal
1929	14	LAF (Santos)	Brasil FC	Santos	SC Botafogo	Santos
1930	15	APEA (Capital)	Antarctica	São Paulo	São Paulo Alpargatas	São Paulo
1930	15	APEA (Countryside)	Amparo	Amparo	Paulista	Jundiaí
1931	16	APEA (Capital)	São Paulo Alpargatas	São Paulo	Antarctica	São Paulo
1931	16	APEA (Countryside)	XV de Piracicaba	Piracicaba	Cravinhos	Cravinhos
1932	17	APEA (Capital)	Albion	São Paulo	Luzitano FC	São Paulo
1932	17	APEA (Campinas)	Guarani	Campinas	Ponte Preta	Campinas
1932	17	APEA (Santos)	Portuguesa Santista	Santos	Hespanha	Santos
1933	18	APEA (Capital)	Fábricas Orion	São Paulo	Ítalo Brasileiro	São Paulo
1933	18	APEA (Campinas)	Ponte Preta	Campinas	Unknown	
1933	18	APEA (Santos)	Portuguesa Santista	Santos	Bandeirantes	Santos
1934	19	APEA (Capital)	Ordem e Progresso	São Paulo	Cama Patente	São Paulo
1934	19	APEA (Campinas)	Campinas FC	Campinas	Bonfim FC	Campinas
1934	19	APEA (Santos)	Portuguesa Santista	Santos	Brasil FC	Santos
1934	19	FPF	Ferroviária	Pindamonhangaba	Teciguará	Guaratinguetá
1935	20	LPF	Albion	São Paulo	São Paulo Railway	São Paulo
1936	21	FPFA	Sírio	São Paulo	CR Tietê	São Paulo
1937	22	FPFA	AA Guanabara	São Paulo	CR Tietê	São Paulo
1938	23	LFESP	Tramway Cantareira	São Paulo	Corinthians	Santo André
1938	23	FPFA	Sírio	São Paulo	AA Guanabara	São Paulo
1939	24	LFESP	Corinthians	Santo André	EC São Bernardo	São Bernardo do Campo
1939	24	FPFA	Sírio	São Paulo	Araguaia	São Paulo
1940	25	LFESP	São Caetano EC	São Caetano do Sul	Cerâmica	São Caetano do Sul
1940	25	FPFA	Santo Amaro	São Paulo	Sírio	São Paulo
1941	26	FPFA	Santo Amaro	São Paulo	Unknown	
1942	27	FPFA (Capital)	Light & Power	São Paulo	Lapeaninho	São Paulo
1942	27	FPFA (Countryside)	Taubaté	Taubaté	Bauru AC	Bauru
1943	28	FPFA (Capital)	América	São Paulo	União Vasco da Gama	São Paulo
1943	28	FPFA (Countryside)	Noroeste	Bauru	Guarani	Campinas
1944	29	FPFA (Capital)	União Vasco da Gama	São Paulo	Ícaro	São Paulo
1944	29	FPFA (Countryside)	Guarani	Campinas	São Bento	Sorocaba
1945	30	FPFA (Capital)	São Cristovão	São Paulo	Ícaro	São Paulo
1945	30	FPFA (Countryside)	Batatais	Batatais	Ponte Preta	Campinas
1946	31	FPFA (Capital)	Santo Amaro	São Paulo	Lapeaninho	São Paulo
1946	31	FPFA (Countryside)	Bauru AC	Bauru	Guarani	Campinas
1947	32	FPF	XV de Piracicaba	Piracicaba	Taubaté	Taubaté
1948	33	FPF	XV de Piracicaba	Piracicaba	Linense	Lins
1949	34	FPF	Guarani	Campinas	Batatais	Batatais
1950	35	FPF	Radium	Mococa	Botafogo	Ribeirão Preto
1951	36	FPF	XV de Jaú	Jaú	Linense	Lins
1952	37	FPF	Linense	Lins	Ferroviária	Araraquara
1953	38	FPF	Noroeste	Bauru	Ferroviária	Araraquara
1954	39	FPF	Taubaté	Taubaté	Comercial	Ribeirão Preto
1955	40	FPF	Ferroviária	Araraquara	Botafogo	Ribeirão Preto
1956	41	FPF	Botafogo	Ribeirão Preto	Paulista	Jundiaí
1957	42	FPF	América	São José do Rio Preto	São Bento	Sorocaba
1958	43	FPF	Comercial	Ribeirão Preto	Corinthians	Presidente Prudente
1959	44	FPF	Corinthians	Presidente Prudente	Bragantino	Bragança Paulista
1960	45	FPF	Esportiva	Guaratinguetá	Catanduva EC	Catanduva
1961	46	FPF	Prudentina	Presidente Prudente	Ponte Preta	Campinas
1962	47	FPF	São Bento	Sorocaba	América	São José do Rio Preto
1963	48	FPF	América	São José do Rio Preto	Taubaté	Taubaté
1964	49	FPF	Portuguesa Santista	Santos	Ponte Preta	Campinas
1965	50	FPF	Bragantino	Bragança Paulista	Barretos	Barretos
1966	51	FPF	Ferroviária	Araraquara	XV de Piracicaba	Piracicaba
1967	52	FPF	XV de Piracicaba	Piracicaba	Bragantino	Bragança Paulista
1968	53	FPF	Paulista	Jundiaí	Francana	Franca
1969	54	FPF	Ponte Preta	Campinas	Francana	Franca
1970	55	FPF	Noroeste	Bauru	Nacional	São Paulo
1971	56	FPF	Marília	Marília	Saad	São Caetano do Sul
1972	57	FPF	São José	São José dos Campos	Garça	Garça
1973	58	FPF	AE Araçatuba	Araçatuba	Rio Claro	Rio Claro
1974	59	FPF	GE Catanduvense	Catanduva	Nacional	São Paulo
1975	60	FPF	Santo André	Santo André	GE Catanduvense	Catanduva
1976	61	FPF	XV de Jaú	Jaú	Aliança	São Bernardo do Campo
1977	62	FPF	Francana	Franca	AE Araçatuba	Araçatuba
1978	63	FPF	Inter de Limeira	Limeira	Velo Clube	Rio Claro
1979	64	FPF	Taubaté	Taubaté	Santo André	Santo André
1980	65	FPF	São José	São José dos Campos	GE Catanduvense	Catanduva
1981	66	FPF	Santo André	Santo André	XV de Piracicaba	Piracicaba
1982	67	FPF	Taquaritinga	Taquaritinga	Bragantino	Bragança Paulista
1983	68	FPF	XV de Piracicaba	Piracicaba	Noroeste	Bauru
1984	69	FPF	Noroeste	Bauru	Paulista	Jundiaí
1985	70	FPF	Mogi Mirim	Mogi Mirim	Novorizontino	Novo Horizonte
1986	71	FPF	Bandeirante	Birigui	Noroeste	Bauru
1987	72	FPF	União São João	Araras	São José	São José dos Campos
1988	73	FPF	Bragantino	Bragança Paulista	GE Catanduvense	Catanduva
1989	74	FPF	Ferroviário	Itu	Ponte Preta	Campinas
1990	75	FPF	Olímpia	Olímpia	Rio Branco	Americana
1991	76	FPF	AE Araçatuba	Araçatuba	EC Lemense	Leme
1992	77	FPF	Taquaritinga	Taquaritinga	AD São Caetano	São Caetano do Sul
1993	78	FPF	Paraguaçuense	Paraguaçu Paulista	Comercial	Ribeirão Preto
1994	79	FPF	AE Araçatuba	Araçatuba	Juventus	São Paulo
1995	80	FPF	Mogi Mirim	Mogi Mirim	XV de Jaú	Jaú
1996	81	FPF	Inter de Limeira	Limeira	Portuguesa Santista	Santos
1997	82	FPF	Matonense	Matão	Ituano	Itu
1998	83	FPF	União Barbarense	Santa Bárbara d'Oeste	América	São José do Rio Preto
1999	84	FPF	América	São José do Rio Preto	Ponte Preta	Campinas
2000	85	FPF	AD São Caetano	São Caetano do Sul	Etti Jundiaí	Jundiaí
2001	86	FPF	Etti Jundiaí	Jundiaí	Santo André	Santo André
2002	87	FPF	Marília	Marília	Francana	Franca
2003	88	FPF	Oeste	Itápolis	Atlético Sorocaba	Sorocaba
2004	89	FPF	Inter de Limeira	Limeira	Taubaté	Taubaté
2005	90	FPF	Juventus	São Paulo	Noroeste	Bauru
2006	91	FPF	Grêmio Barueri	Barueri	Sertãozinho	Sertãozinho
2007	92	FPF	Portuguesa	São Paulo	Rio Preto	São José do Rio Preto
2008	93	FPF	Santo André	Santo André	Oeste	Itápolis
2009	94	FPF	Monte Azul	Monte Azul Paulista	Rio Branco	Americana
2010	95	FPF	Linense	Lins	Noroeste	Bauru
2011	96	FPF	XV de Piracicaba	Piracicaba	Guarani	Campinas
2012	97	FPF	São Bernardo FC	São Bernardo do Campo	União Barbarense	Santa Bárbara d'Oeste
2013	98	FPF	Portuguesa	São Paulo	Rio Claro	Rio Claro
2014	99	FPF	Capivariano	Capivari	Red Bull Brasil	Campinas
2015	100	FPF	Ferroviária	Araraquara	Novorizontino	Novo Horizonte
2016	101	FPF	Santo André	Santo André	Mirassol	Mirassol
2017	102	FPF	AD São Caetano	São Caetano do Sul	Bragantino	Bragança Paulista
2018	103	FPF	Guarani	Campinas	Oeste	Barueri
2019	104	FPF	Santo André	Santo André	Inter de Limeira	Limeira
2020	105	FPF	AD São Caetano	São Caetano do Sul	São Bento	Sorocaba
2021	106	FPF	São Bernardo FC	São Bernardo do Campo	Água Santa	Diadema
2022	107	FPF	Portuguesa	São Paulo	São Bento	Sorocaba
2023	108	FPF	Ponte Preta	Campinas	Novorizontino	Novo Horizonte
2024	109	FPF	Velo Clube	Rio Claro	Noroeste	Bauru
2025	110	FPF	Capivariano	Capivari	Primavera	Indaiatuba
2026	111	FPF	Juventus	São Paulo	Ferroviária	Araraquara

Federations

Amateur Era (1916-1946)

- APEA - Associação Paulista de Esportes Atléticos
- LAF - Liga dos Amadores de Football
- FPF - Federação Paulista de Football
- LPF - Liga Paulista de Futebol
- LFESP - Liga de Futebol do Estado de São Paulo
- FPFA - Federação Paulista de Futebol Amador

Professional Era (1947-)

- FPF - Federação Paulista de Futebol

Names change

- CA Siléx was changed the name to CE América.
- AA São Paulo Alpargatas was changed the name to CA Albion.
- Cotonifício Rodolfo Crespi is the currently CA Juventus.
- Hespanha is the currently Jabaquara AC.
- Ferroviário is the currently Ituano FC.
- During a partnership with the food brand Etti, Paulista FC played in some championships under the name "Etti Jundiaí".

Cities change

- Oeste FC has moved from Itápolis to Barueri.
- Primeiro de Maio FC and Corinthians FC are originally from São Bernardo do Campo. Santo André has emanciped from São Bernardo do Campo in 1938.

== Titles by club ==
Teams in bold stills active.

Rank	Club	Winners	Winning years
1	**Taubaté**	6	1918 APEA (Countryside), 1926 LAF (Countryside), 1928 LAF (Countryside), 1942 FPFA (Countryside), 1954, 1979
1	**XV de Piracicaba**	6	1931 APEA (Countryside), 1947, 1948, 1967, 1983, 2011
3	**Santo André**	5	1975, 1981, 2008, 2016, 2019
4	**Guarani**	4	1932 APEA (Campinas), 1944 FPFA (Countryside), 1949, 2018
4	**Noroeste**	4	1943 FPFA (Countryside), 1953, 1970, 1984
4	**Paulista**	4	1919 APEA (Countryside), 1921 APEA (Countryside), 1968, 2001
4	**Ponte Preta**	4	1927 LAF (Countryside), 1932 APEA (Campinas), 1969, 2023
4	**Portuguesa Santista**	4	1932 APEA (Santos), 1933 APEA (Santos), 1934 APEA (Santos), 1964
4	Sírio	4	1920 APEA (Capital), 1936 FPFA, 1938 FPFA, 1939 FPFA
10	Albion	3	1931 APEA (Capital), 1932 APEA (Capital), 1935 LPF
10	**América (Rio Preto)**	3	1957, 1963, 1999
10	CE América	3	1925 APEA (Capital), 1928 APEA (Capital), 1943 FPFA (Capital)
10	**AE Araçatuba**	3	1973, 1991, 1994
10	**Ferroviária**	3	1955, 1966, 2015
10	**Inter de Limeira**	3	1978, 1996, 2004
10	**Juventus**	3	1929 APEA (Capital), 2005, 2026
10	**Portuguesa**	3	2007, 2013, 2022
10	Santo Amaro	3	1940 FPFA, 1941 FPFA, 1946 FPFA (Capital)
10	**AD São Caetano**	3	2000, 2017, 2020
10	União Fluminense	3	1918 APEA (Capital), 1919 APEA (Capital), 1928 LAF (Capital)
21	**Amparo**	2	1928 LAF (Countryside), 1930 APEA (Countryside)
21	**Botafogo**	2	1927 APEA (Countryside), 1956
21	**Bragantino**	2	1965, 1988
21	Brasil FC	2	1928 LAF (Santos), 1929 LAF (Santos)
21	**Capivariano**	2	2014, 2025
21	Independência	2	1921 APEA (Capital), 1924 APEA (Capital)
21	**Linense**	2	1952, 2010
21	**Marília**	2	1971, 2002
21	**Mogi Mirim**	2	1985, 1995
21	**Rio Branco**	2	1922 APEA (Countryside), 1923 APEA (Countryside)
21	**Rio Claro**	2	1928 LAF (Countryside), 1929 LAF (Countryside)
21	**São Bernardo FC**	2	2012, 2021
21	São Caetano EC	2	1928 APEA (Countryside), 1940 LFESP
21	**São José**	2	1972, 1980
21	**Taquaritinga**	2	1982, 1992
21	**Velo Clube**	2	1925 APEA (Countryside), 2024
21	**XV de Jaú**	2	1951, 1976
38	Antarctica	1	1930 APEA (Capital)
38	Associação Graphica	1	1922 APEA (Capital)
38	Audax	1	1923 APEA (Capital)
38	**Bandeirante**	1	1986
38	**Batatais**	1	1945 FPFA (Countryside)
38	Bauru AC	1	1946 FPFA (Countryside)
38	Campinas FC	1	1934 APEA (Campinas)
38	**Comercial**	1	1958
38	Corinthians (Jundiaí)	1	1920 APEA (Countryside)
38	Corinthians (PP)	1	1959
38	Corinthians (Santo André)	1	1939 LFESP
38	Elvira	1	1926 APEA (Countryside)
38	Esportiva	1	1960
38	Fábricas Orion	1	1933 APEA (Capital)
38	Ferroviária (Pindamonhangaba)	1	1934 FPF
38	Floresta	1	1929 APEA (Countryside)
38	**Francana**	1	1977
38	GE Catanduvense	1	1974
38	Grêmio Barueri	1	2006
38	AA Guanabara	1	1937 FPFA
38	**Ituano**	1	1989
38	**Jabaquara**	1	1927 LAF (Santos)
38	Light & Power	1	1942 FPFA (Capital)
38	**Matonense**	1	1997
38	Minas Gerais	1	1917 APEA
38	**Monte Azul**	1	2009
38	**Oeste**	1	2003
38	**Olímpia**	1	1990
38	Ordem e Progresso	1	1934 APEA (Capital)
38	Paraguaçuense	1	1993
38	Primeiro de Maio	1	1926 APEA (Capital)
38	Prudentina	1	1961
38	Radium	1	1950
38	Sant'Anna	1	1926 LAF (Capital)
38	**São Bento**	1	1962
38	São Cristovão	1	1945 FPFA (Capital)
38	São Geraldo	1	1929 LAF (Capital)
38	Tramway Cantareira	1	1938 LFESP
38	**União Barbarense**	1	1998
38	União Brasil	1	1916 LPF
38	União Lapa	1	1927 LAF (Capital)
38	**União São João**	1	1987
38	União Vasco da Gama	1	1944 FPFA (Capital)
38	Voluntários da Pátria	1	1927 APEA (Capital)

=== Titles by city ===
City	Championships	Clubs
São Paulo	40	Sírio (4), Albion (3), CE América (3), Juventus (3), Portuguesa (3), Santo Amaro (3), União Fluminense (3), Independência (2), Antarctica (1), Associação Graphica (1), Audax (1), Fábricas Orion (1), AA Guanabara (1), Light & Power (1), Minas Gerais (1), Ordem e Progresso (1), Sant'Anna (1), São Cristovão (1), São Geraldo (1), Tramway Cantareira (1), União Brasil (1), União Lapa (1), União Vasco da Gama (1), Voluntários da Pátria (1)
Campinas	9	Guarani (4), Ponte Preta (4), Campinas FC (1)
Santo André	7	Santo André (5), Corinthians (1), Primeiro de Maio (1)
Santos	7	Portuguesa Santista (4), Brasil FC (2), Jabaquara (1)
Piracicaba	6	XV de Piracicaba (6)
Taubaté	6	Taubaté (6)
Bauru	5	Noroeste (4), Bauru AC (1)
Jundiaí	5	Paulista (4), Corinthians (1)
São Caetano do Sul	5	AD São Caetano (3), São Caetano EC (2)
Rio Claro	4	Rio Claro (2), Velo Clube (2)
Amparo	3	Amparo (2), Floresta (1)
Araçatuba	3	AE Araçatuba (3)
Araraquara	3	Ferroviária (3)
Limeira	3	Inter de Limeira (3)
Ribeirão Preto	3	Botafogo (2), Comercial (1)
São José do Rio Preto	3	América (3)
Americana	2	Rio Branco (2)
Bragança Paulista	2	Bragantino (2)
Capivari	2	Capivariano (2)
Jaú	2	XV de Jaú (2)
Lins	2	Linense (2)
Marília	2	Marília (2)
Mogi Mirim	2	Mogi Mirim (2)
Presidente Prudente	2	Corinthians (1), Prudentina (1)
São Bernardo do Campo	2	São Bernardo FC (2)
São José dos Campos	2	São José (2)
Taquaritinga	2	Taquaritinga (2)
Araras	1	União São João (1)
Barueri	1	Grêmio Barueri (1)
Batatais	1	Batatais (1)
Birigui	1	Bandeirante (1)
Catanduva	1	GE Catanduvense (1)
Guaratinguetá	1	Esportiva (1)
Itápolis	1	Oeste (1)
Itu	1	Ituano (1)
Jacareí	1	Elvira (1)
Matão	1	Matonense (1)
Mococa	1	Radium (1)
Monte Azul Paulista	1	Monte Azul (1)
Olímpia	1	Olímpia (1)
Paraguaçu Paulista	1	Paraguaçuense (1)
Pindamonhangaba	1	Ferroviária (1)
Santa Bárbara d'Oeste	1	União Barbarense (1)
Sorocaba	1	São Bento (1)

== Top scorers ==
Season	Top scorer	Club	Goals
1998	(Brazil) Gilson Batata	União Barbarense	18
1999	(Brazil) Roberto Carlos	América	16
2000	(Brazil) Túlio	São Caetano	18
2001	(Brazil) Guin	Rio Preto	20
2002	(Brazil) Tico Mineiro	Francana	16
2003	(Brazil) Ricardo Xavier	Atlético Sorocaba	12
2003	(Brazil) Clóvis	Francana	12
2004	(Brazil) Reginaldo	Bandeirante	15
2005	(Brazil) Didi	Bragantino	13
2006	(Brazil) Everton	Barueri	17
2007	(Brazil) Anderson	Rio Preto	12
2008	(Brazil) Márcio Mixirica	Santo André	13
2009	(Brazil) Lincom	Rio Branco	20
2010	(Brazil) Fausto	Linense	24
2011	(Brazil) Bruno Nunes	Rio Preto	15
2012	(Brazil) Martins	Pão de Açúcar	17
2013	(Brazil) Romão	Capivariano	17
2014	(Brazil) Nunes	Santo André	10
2015	(Brazil) Marcelo Toscano	Mirassol	13
2015	(Brazil) Jobinho	Rio Branco	13
2015	(Brazil) Diogo Acosta	São Caetano	13
2016	(Brazil) Thiago Santos	Bragantino	12
2017	(Brazil) Carlão	São Caetano	10
2018	(Brazil) Bruno Xavier	Nacional	10
2019	(Brazil) Alvinho	Água Santa	11
2020	(Brazil) Léo Castro	Juventus	9
2020	(Brazil) Bambam	São Bento	9
2021	(Brazil) Dadá Belmonte	Água Santa	7
2021	(Brazil) Cesinha	Rio Claro	7
2022	(Brazil) Bruno Lopes	Oeste	7
2023	(Brazil) Bruno Moraes	Juventus	12
2024	(Brazil) Carlão	Noroeste	11
2025	(Brazil) Vinícius Popó	Capivariano	10
2026	(Brazil) Luketa	Sertãozinho	9

== See also ==
- Campeonato Paulista
- Campeonato Paulista Série A3
- Campeonato Paulista Série A4
- Campeonato Paulista Segunda Divisão
- Campeonato Paulista Série B3
- Federação Paulista de Futebol
