= 1954 São Paulo FC season =

São Paulo
1954 season
- Chairman: Cícero Pompeu de Toledo
- Manager: Jim López; Leônidas da Silva
- Torneio Rio-São Paulo: 4th
- Campeonato Paulista: 4th

The 1954 football season was São Paulo's 25th season since club's existence.

== Overall ==
Games played	64 (9 Torneio Rio-São Paulo, 26 Campeonato Paulista, 29 Friendly match)
Games won	37 (4 Torneio Rio-São Paulo, 14 Campeonato Paulista, 19 Friendly match)
Games drawn	13 (2 Torneio Rio-São Paulo, 5 Campeonato Paulista, 6 Friendly match)
Games lost	14 (3 Torneio Rio-São Paulo, 7 Campeonato Paulista, 4 Friendly match)
Goals scored	111
Goals conceded	68
Goal difference	+43
Best result	5–1 (H) v Ypiranga - Campeonato Paulista - 1954.10.01
Worst result	1–5 (A) v Botafogo - Torneio Rio-São Paulo - 1954.06.26
Most appearances	
Top scorer	

Source: São Paulo FC

== Friendlies ==
January 28 Taça dos Campeões RJ-SP	Flamengo	1–3	São Paulo	Rio de Janeiro
	Goal		Goal	Stadium: Estádio Municipal do Rio de Janeiro (Maracanã)

February 4 Taça dos Campeões RJ-SP	São Paulo	1–0	Flamengo	São Paulo
	Goal			Stadium: Estádio Paulo Machado de Carvalho (Pacaembu)

February 21 National	Botafogo	4–2	São Paulo	Volta Redonda
	Goal		Goal	Stadium: Estádio Municipal General Raulino de Oliveira (da Cidadania)

February 23 National	Internacional	2–1	São Paulo	Porto Alegre
				Stadium: Estádio dos Eucaliptos

March 6 National	São Paulo	3–0	Comercial	São Paulo
	Goal			Stadium: Estádio Paulo Machado de Carvalho (Pacaembu)

March 21 Taça FAB	Náutico	2–2	São Paulo	Recife
	Goal		Goal	Stadium: Estádio Adelmar da Costa Carvalho (Ilha do Retiro)

March 24 Taça São Paulo–Recife	Sport Recife	0–4	São Paulo	Recife
			Goal	Stadium: Estádio Adelmar da Costa Carvalho (Ilha do Retiro)

March 28 Taça Cidade do Recife	Santa Cruz	0–2	São Paulo	Recife
			Goal	Stadium: Estádio Adelmar da Costa Carvalho (Ilha do Retiro)

March 31 Taça Adelmar Carvalho	Sport Recife	1–3	São Paulo	Recife
	Goal		Goal	Stadium: Estádio Adelmar da Costa Carvalho (Ilha do Retiro)

April 4 Taça Cia. Antartica Paulista	Bahia	1–2	São Paulo	Salvador
	Goal		Goal	Stadium: Campo da Graça

April 8 National	Ypiranga-BA	1–1	São Paulo	Salvador
	Goal		Goal	Stadium: Campo da Graça

April 11 Taça Governardo Regis Pacheco	Vitória	0–0	São Paulo	Salvador
				Stadium: Campo da Graça

April 18 National	Linense	2–1	São Paulo	Lins
	Goal		Goal

April 21 National	Corinthians (Santo André)	0–2	São Paulo	Santo André
			Goal	Stadium: Estádio Américo Guazzelli

April 25 National	Catanduva	1–0	São Paulo	Catanduva
	Goal

May 2 Torneio Triangular de Uberaba	Uberaba	0–4	São Paulo	Uberaba
			Goal	Stadium: Estádio Boulanger Pucci

May 6 Torneio Triangular de Uberaba	Fluminense	0–1	São Paulo	Uberaba
			Goal

May 9 National	Uberlândia	0–1	São Paulo	Uberlândia
			Goal	Stadium: Juca Ribeiro

July 9 National	Avareense	1–2	São Paulo	Avaré
				Stadium: Paulo Araújo de Moraes

July 18 Taça Charles Miller	Palmeiras	1–1	São Paulo	São Paulo
	Goal		Goal	Stadium: Estádio Paulo Machado de Carvalho (Pacaembu)

July 25 Taça Charles Miller	Corinthians	3–3	São Paulo	São Paulo
	Goal		Goal	Stadium: Estádio Paulo Machado de Carvalho (Pacaembu)

July 28 National	Juventus	2–1	São Paulo	São Paulo
	Goal		Goal	Stadium: Estádio Paulo Machado de Carvalho (Pacaembu)

July 31 National	São Paulo	2–1	America-RJ	São Paulo
	Goal		Goal	Stadium: Estádio Paulo Machado de Carvalho (Pacaembu)

August 4 National	São Paulo	1–0	São Cristóvão	São Paulo
	Goal			Stadium: Estádio Paulo Machado de Carvalho (Pacaembu)

August 8 National	Taubaté	2–5	São Paulo	Taubaté
	Goal		Goal	Stadium: Campo do Bosque

September 7 National	Taubaté	1–2	São Paulo	Taubaté
	Goal		Goal	Stadium: Campo do Bosque

September 19 National	Corinthians (Santo André)	0–1	São Paulo	Santo André
				Stadium: Américo Guazzelli

November 14 Taça Jorge F. Mattos	Comercial	2–4	São Paulo	Ribeirão Preto
	Goal		Goal

November 16 National	Uberaba	0–2	São Paulo	Uberaba
			Goal	Stadium: Estádio Boulanger Pucci

November 28 National	Marília	0–1	São Paulo	Marília
			Goal

== Official competitions ==
=== Torneio Rio-São Paulo ===
May 16 1	Palmeiras	1–0	São Paulo	São Paulo
	Goal			Stadium: Estádio Paulo Machado de Carvalho (Pacaembu)

May 30 2	Vasco da Gama	1–0	São Paulo	Rio de Janeiro
	Goal			Stadium: Estádio Municipal do Rio de Janeiro (Maracanã)

June 2 3	São Paulo	2–1	Santos	São Paulo
	Goal		Goal	Stadium: Estádio Paulo Machado de Carvalho (Pacaembu)

June 5 4	São Paulo	3–2	America-RJ	São Paulo
	Goal		Goal	Stadium: Estádio Paulo Machado de Carvalho (Pacaembu)

June 13 5	São Paulo	2–0	Portuguesa	São Paulo
	Goal			Stadium: Estádio Paulo Machado de Carvalho (Pacaembu)

June 20 6	São Paulo	1–1	Fluminense	São Paulo
	Goal		Goal	Stadium: Estádio Paulo Machado de Carvalho (Pacaembu)

June 26 7	Botafogo	5–1	São Paulo	Rio de Janeiro
	Goal		Goal	Stadium: Estádio Municipal do Rio de Janeiro (Maracanã)

July 3 8	São Paulo	1–0	Corinthians	São Paulo
	Goal			Stadium: Estádio Paulo Machado de Carvalho (Pacaembu)

July 11 9	São Paulo	0–0	Flamengo	São Paulo
				Stadium: Estádio Paulo Machado de Carvalho (Pacaembu)

==== Record ====
Final Position	Points	Matches	Wins	Draws	Losses	Goals For	Goals Away	Win%
4th	10	9	4	2	3	10	11	55%

=== Campeonato Paulista ===
August 15 1	Noroeste	0–1	São Paulo	Bauru
			Goal	Stadium: Estádio Alfredo de Castilho

August 21 2	Juventus	2–0	São Paulo	São Paulo
	Goal			Stadium: Estádio Paulo Machado de Carvalho (Pacaembu)

August 29 3	São Paulo	2–1	XV de Jaú	São Paulo
	Goal		Goal	Stadium: Estádio Paulo Machado de Carvalho (Pacaembu)

September 5 4	Santos	1–1	São Paulo	Santos
	Goal		Goal	Stadium: Estádio Urbano Caldeira (Vila Belmiro)

September 12 5	Ponte Preta	2–3	São Paulo	Campinas
	Goal		Goal	Stadium: Estádio Moisés Lucarelli

September 22 6	São Paulo	2–0	Linense	São Paulo
	Goal			Stadium: Estádio Paulo Machado de Carvalho (Pacaembu)

September 26 7	XV de Piracicaba	2–3	São Paulo	Piracicaba
	Goal		Goal	Stadium: Campo da Rua Regente Feijó

October 1 8	São Paulo	5–1	Ypiranga	São Paulo
	Goal		Goal	Stadium: Estádio Paulo Machado de Carvalho (Pacaembu)

October 10 9	Palmeiras	1–2	São Paulo	São Paulo
	Goal		Goal	Stadium: Estádio Paulo Machado de Carvalho (Pacaembu)

October 17 10	Portuguesa	1–0	São Paulo	São Paulo
	Goal			Stadium: Estádio Paulo Machado de Carvalho (Pacaembu)

October 23 11	São Paulo	3–1	São Bento (São Caetano do Sul)	São Paulo
	Goal		Goal	Stadium: Estádio Paulo Machado de Carvalho (Pacaembu)

October 30 12	São Paulo	0–1	Guarani	São Paulo
			Goal	Stadium: Estádio Paulo Machado de Carvalho (Pacaembu)

November 7 13	Corinthians	2–1	São Paulo	São Paulo
	Goal		Goal	Stadium: Estádio Paulo Machado de Carvalho (Pacaembu)

November 20 14	São Paulo	1–1	Noroeste	São Paulo
	Goal		Goal	Stadium: Estádio Paulo Machado de Carvalho (Pacaembu)

November 24 15	São Paulo	2–0	Ponte Preta	São Paulo
	Goal			Stadium: Estádio Paulo Machado de Carvalho (Pacaembu)

December 5 16	São Bento (São Caetano do Sul)	0–2	São Paulo	São Paulo
			Goal	Stadium: Estádio Paulo Machado de Carvalho (Pacaembu)

December 11 17	São Paulo	3–0	XV de Piracicaba	São Paulo
	Goal			Stadium: Estádio Paulo Machado de Carvalho (Pacaembu)

December 19 18	São Paulo	2–0	Santos	São Paulo
	Goal			Stadium: Estádio Paulo Machado de Carvalho (Pacaembu)

December 26 19	Guarani	2–2	São Paulo	Campinas
	Goal		Goal	Stadium: Estádio Brinco de Ouro da Princesa

January 2, 1955 20	XV de Jaú	2–3	São Paulo	Jaú
	Goal		Goal	Stadium: Estádio Artur Simões

January 9, 1955 21	São Paulo	0–1	Ypiranga	São Paulo
			Goal	Stadium: Estádio Paulo Machado de Carvalho (Pacaembu)

January 16, 1955 22	Palmeiras	1–1	São Paulo	São Paulo
	Goal		Goal	Stadium: Estádio Paulo Machado de Carvalho (Pacaembu)

January 23, 1955 23	São Paulo	3–2	Portuguesa	São Paulo
	Goal		Goal	Stadium: Estádio Paulo Machado de Carvalho (Pacaembu)

January 30, 1955 24	Linense	1–1	São Paulo	Lins
	Goal		Goal

February 5, 1955 25	São Paulo	2–1	Juventus	São Paulo
	Goal		Goal	Stadium: Estádio Paulo Machado de Carvalho (Pacaembu)

February 13, 1955 26	Corinthians	3–1	São Paulo	São Paulo
	Goal		Goal	Stadium: Estádio Paulo Machado de Carvalho (Pacaembu)

==== Record ====
Final Position	Points	Matches	Wins	Draws	Losses	Goals For	Goals Away	Win%
4th	33	26	15	5	6	46	29	64%
