= Ypê (Brazilian company) =

- Founded: 1950
- Founder: Waldyr Beira
- Headquarters: Amparo, São Paulo, Brazil
- Products: Detergents, Bleach, Fabric softeners, Disinfectants, Disinfectants, Steel wool pads, among others.
- Website: www.ype.ind.br

Ypê is a Brazilian hygiene and cleaning products company headquartered in the city of Amparo, in the interior of the state of São Paulo.

== History ==
Founded in 1950, the company began by making homemade bar soap in a small warehouse in downtown Amparo, in the interior of São Paulo. Inspired by the philosophy of its founder, Waldyr Beira, it has continued to grow.

In 2022, Ypê has 7 126 employees.

== Controversy ==
On May 7, 2026, the Brazilian Health Regulatory Agency (ANVISA) ordered the recall of batches ending in 1 of the brand The reason was the failure to comply with essential production standards, coupled with deficiencies in the quality assurance and control systems for the items. A visit to the company’s production line in Amparo (SP) revealed a buildup of dust on machinery and pipes, as well as the presence of Pseudomonas aeruginosa bacteria in product samples.
