= Tiago (footballer, born 1984) =

Brazilian footballer (born 1984)

Personal information
- Full name: Tiago dos Santos Roberto
- Date of birth: 21 March 1984 (age 42)
- Place of birth: São Paulo, Brazil
- Height: 1.77 m (5 ft 9 1/2 in)
- Position: Forward

Youth career
- 2002: Corinthians Paulista

Senior career*
Years	Team	Apps	(Gls)
2003	Corinthians Alagoano	0	(0)
2004–2005	Paulista	0	(0)
2006	DPMM		(12)
2007	Extrema	0	(0)
2007	Jaguares de Tapachula	12	(3)
2008	DPMM		(2)
2008	Gloria Buzău	5	(0)
2009	Força	0	(0)
2010	Fluminense de Feira	0	(0)
2010	Amparo	0	(0)
2011	Fast	0	(0)
2011	Dhofar		
2012	Mogi Mirim	0	(0)
2012	Sorriso	0	(0)
2013	Aguila	4	(0)
2013	Guarani	0	(0)
- * Club domestic league appearances and goals

Tiago (born Tiago dos Santos Roberto; 21 March 1984) is a Brazilian footballer who plays as a forward.

== Career ==
Born on 21 March 1984, in São Paulo, Tiago left for Corinthians Alagoano in 2003, played twice in the national cup. He did not play in 2003 Campeonato Brasileiro Série C. May 2004 he returned to São Paulo state and signed a 5-year contract with Paulista. He did not play in 2005 Campeonato Brasileiro Série B.

In January 2006, he left for Brunei DPMM, who play in the Malaysia Premier League. He managed to score hat-tricks against Kelantan and Pulau Pinang in Malaysia's second tier, helping the Bruneian team secure a promotion play-off place. In February 2007 Tiago returned to Brazil and signed a contract with Extrema. In mid-2007, he left for Mexican side Chiapas but mainly a player for its B Team in Primera División A.

In January 2008, Tiago returned to DPMM, who were playing in the Malaysia Super League.

In summer 2008, he joined Romanian Liga I club Gloria Buzău, played 5 times, he was fired for discipline problem.

In 2009, he returned to Brazil for Campeonato Paulista Série A3 club Força. He played twice in the state 3rd level and was sent off on the first match he played.

In February 2010, he was signed by Fluminense de Feira. He was released before the start of 2010 Campeonato Brasileiro Série D.

In June 2010, he was signed by Amparo for 2010 Campeonato Paulista Segunda Divisão. He played 6 matches in the state league, scored 3 times.

In January 2011, he was signed by Fast until the end of 2011 Campeonato Amazonense. In mid-2011, he left for Omani club Dhofar.

In 2012, Tiago returned to Brazil and signed a contract with Mogi Mirim, he was transferred to Sorriso in March and signed a contract until June 2012.

In 2013, he left for C.D. Águila.
