= 1933 Campeonato Paulista =

The 1933 Campeonato Paulista was the 32nd season of São Paulo's top association football league. Two championships were disputed that season, each by a different league. During the year, the professionalism controversy flared up again, as in Rio de Janeiro, the Liga Carioca de Football was formed as a professional football league, in opposition to AMEA (Associação Metropolitana de Esportes Atléticos), which did not allow professionalism. The national federation, CBD, took AMEA's side and refused to allow professionalism. As a consequence, in São Paulo, the state federation, APEA, which accepted professionalist practices since 1926, broke with CBD, and joined LCF to form the FBF (Federação Brasileira de Football). To counter that, CBD sponsored the formation of an amateur league in São Paulo, the Federação Paulista de Football, to compete with APEA.

Meanwhile, FBF created the Rio-São Paulo Tournament, with the presence of all of APEA's teams, except for Sírio, and as such, all of the matches of their Campeonato Paulista, except for those involving Sírio, were valid for that tournament as well.

== APEA Championship ==
Campeonato Paulista
- Season: 1933
- Champions: Palestra Itália
- Matches played: 56
- Goals scored: 272 (4.86 per match)
- Top goalscorer: Valdemar de Brito (São Paulo) – 21 goals
- Biggest home win: São Paulo 12–1 Sírio (August 27, 1933)
- Biggest away win: Sírio 1–10 Corinthians (May 21, 1933)
- Highest scoring: São Paulo 12–1 Sírio (August 27, 1933)

In the edition organized by the APEA (Associação Paulista de Esportes Atléticos), Palestra Itália won the title for the 5th time. no teams were relegated and the top scorer was São Paulo's Valdemar de Brito with 21 goals.

=== System ===
The championship was disputed in a double round-robin system, with the team with the most points winning the title.

=== Championship ===
Pos	Team	Pld	W	D	L	GF	GA	GD	Pts	Qualification or relegation
1	Palestra Itália	14	12	1	1	48	13	+35	25	Champions
2	São Paulo	14	11	1	2	62	16	+46	23	
3	Portuguesa	14	9	3	2	41	16	+25	21	
4	Corinthians	14	7	1	6	31	38	−7	15	
5	Santos	14	6	1	7	41	38	+3	13	
6	São Bento	14	4	1	9	19	27	−8	9	
7	Ypiranga	14	3	0	11	20	44	−24	6	
8	Sírio	14	0	0	14	10	80	−70	0	

Updated to match(es) played on November 26, 1933. Source: RSSSF.com
Rules for classification: 1) points; 2) goal difference; 3) wins; 4) head-to-head points.

== FPF Championship ==
Campeonato Paulista
- Season: 1933
- Champions: Albion
- Matches played: 53
- Goals scored: 223 (4.21 per match)
- Biggest home win: União Vasco da Gama 8-0 Minas Gerais (July 18, 1933)
- Biggest away win: União Vasco da Gama 1-6 Albion (December 24, 1933)
- Highest scoring: Albion 8-4 AA das Palmeiras (July 11, 1933)

In the edition organized by the FPF, which wasn't recognized by the present-day FPF as an official Paulista championship until 2021, Albion won the title for the 1st time. Thirteen teams signed up for that championship, with three of the most important sides withdrawing even before the start of the championship, leaving only ten teams. Paulista won the Torneio Início, but withdrew before the championship proper started as well, leaving nine. By December, only five teams were left, with two teams withdrawing at the end of the First round and the other two withdrawing midway through the second round.

=== System ===
The championship was disputed in a double round-robin format, with the team with the most points winning the title.

=== Championship ===
Pos	Team	Pld	W	D	L	GF	GA	GD	Pts	Qualification or relegation
1	Albion	14	11	2	1	32	15	+17	24	Champions
2	União Guarany	14	8	3	3	27	19	+8	19	
3	São Paulo Railway	14	7	4	3	21	18	+3	18	
4	Casale Paulista	14	6	5	3	32	23	+9	17	
5	Feira Livre	14	5	2	7	25	26	−1	12	Withdrew in the second round; Remaining matches counted as walkovers
6	União Vasco da Gama	14	3	5	6	28	35	−7	11	
7	AA das Palmeiras	14	3	1	10	23	35	−12	7	Withdrew in the second round; Remaining matches counted as walkovers
8	Minas Gerais	8	2	0	6	11	22	−11	4	Withdrew after the end of the first round
9	República	8	1	0	7	14	20	−6	2	Withdrew after the end of the first round
10	Guarani	0	0	0	0	0	0	0	0	Withdrew before the start of the championship
11	Juventus	0	0	0	0	0	0	0	0	Withdrew before the start of the championship
12	Paulista	0	0	0	0	0	0	0	0	Withdrew before the start of the championship
13	Atlético Santista	0	0	0	0	0	0	0	0	Withdrew before the start of the championship

Updated to match(es) played on December 31, 1933. Source: Brfut.blogspot.com
Rules for classification: 1) points; 2) goal difference; 3) wins; 4) head-to-head points.
