= Nenê (footballer, born 1925) =

Brazilian footballer

Personal information
- Full name: Ayrton Leite
- Date of birth: 25 June 1925
- Place of birth: São Paulo, Brazil
- Date of death: 22 August 2007 (aged 82)
- Place of death: São Paulo, Brazil
- Positions: Midfielder; forward

Youth career
- Ypiranga-SP

Senior career*
Years	Team	Apps	(Gls)
1945–1947	Ypiranga-SP		
1947–1950	Corinthians	75	(21)
1950	Ypiranga-SP		
1951	Juventus-SP		
1952–1954	São Paulo	41	(12)
- * Club domestic league appearances and goals as of 15 October 2023

Ayrton Leite (25 June 1925 – 22 August 2007), better known as Nenê, was a Brazilian professional footballer who played as a midfielder and forward.

== Career ==
Nenê started his career at Ypiranga, and had spells at Corinthians, Juventus and São Paulo. Versatile, he played as a midfielder, striker or winger. Ended his career due to a serious knee injury.

== Honours ==
Corinthians

- Taça Cidade de São Paulo: 1947
- Torneio Rio-São Paulo: 1950

São Paulo

- Taça Armando Arruda Pereira: 1952
- Campeonato Paulista: 1953
