= Esporte Clube Paraguaçuense =

Association football club in Brazil

Paraguaçuense
- Full name: Esporte Clube Paraguaçuense
- Nickname(s): Azulão do Vale (Bluebird of the Valley)
- Founded: November 28, 1965; 59 years ago
- Ground: Estádio Municipal Carlos Affini, Paraguaçu Paulista, São Paulo state, Brazil
- Capacity: 15,103
- President: Cláudio da Cruz
Home colors	Away colors

Esporte Clube Paraguaçuense, commonly known as Paraguaçuense, is a currently inactive Brazilian football club based in Paraguaçu Paulista, São Paulo. The club was formerly known as Esporte Clube Municipal.

== History ==
The club was founded on November 28, 1965, as Esporte Clube Municipal. They won the Campeonato Paulista Série A2 in 1993.

== Honours ==
- Campeonato Paulista Série A2
  - Winners (1): 1993

== Stadium ==
Esporte Clube Paraguaçuense play their home games at Estádio Carlos Affini. The stadium has a maximum capacity of 15,102 people.
