= União Lapa Foot-Ball Club =

Brazilian football club

União Lapa
- Full name: União Lapa Foot-Ball Club
- Nickname: Veterano
- Founded: 1 September 1910; 115 years ago
- Ground: Campo da Rua Doze de Outubro
Home colors

União Lapa Foot-Ball Club is a football club based in São Paulo, Brazil. The club played in the Campeonato Paulista in 1916 and 1928, and nowadays is only an amateur side.

== History ==
União Lapa was founded in 1910.

== Honours ==
- Campeonato Paulista
  - Runners-up (1): 1916
- Campeonato Paulista Série A2
  - Winners (1): 1927
