= Amparo Athlético Club =

Amparo
- Full name: Amparo Athlético Club
- Nickname: Mountain Lion
- Founded: 28 April 1919; 106 years ago
- Ground: José de Araújo Cintra
- Capacity: 4,675
- President: Luciano Antonacci
- Head coach: Aarão Alves
- 2023: Paulista Segunda Divisão, 18th of 36
Home colors	Away colors

Amparo Athlético Club, commonly known as Amparo, is a Brazilian football club based in Amparo, São Paulo.

== History ==
Founded in 1919, Amparo AC is one of the oldest professional teams in the state of São Paulo. It achieved its greatest achievements at the end of the 1920s, when it won the interior championship twice. Due to being licensed frequently, Amparo ended up moving to the last divisions, returning to compete professionally with more sequence from 2015, at the Campeonato Paulista Segunda Divisão. Amparo has directly benefited from the unification of titles promoted by the FPF in 2021.

== Honours ==
- Campeonato Paulista Série A2
  - Winners (2): 1928 LAF (Countryside), 1930 APEA (Countryside)
