= Taça Armando Arruda Pereira =

1952 Taça Armando Arruda Pereira
Torneio Quadrangular Rio-São Paulo

Tournament details
- Country: Brazil; São Paulo, SP
- Dates: Aug 3–15
- Teams: 4

Final positions
- Champions: São Paulo
- Runners-up: Palmeiras

Tournament statistics
- Matches played: 5
- Goals scored: 15 (3 per match)
- Top goal scorer: Albella – 4 goals

The Taça Armando Arruda Pereira, also knowly Torneio Quadrangular Rio-São Paulo was an official tournament organized by São Paulo and Rio de Janeiro state federations reuniting four of the "big eight clubs" of their leagues. Armando de Arruda Pereira is the São Paulo's city mayor during 1952.

== Participants ==
Club	City	State
Flamengo	Rio de Janeiro	(Rio de Janeiro (state)) Rio de Janeiro
Palmeiras	São Paulo	(São Paulo (state)) São Paulo
São Paulo	São Paulo	(São Paulo (state)) São Paulo
Vasco da Gama	Rio de Janeiro	(Rio de Janeiro (state)) Rio de Janeiro

== Matches ==
Aug 3

São Paulo (São Paulo (state))	4–1	(Rio de Janeiro (state)) Flamengo
Nenê 39', 82'; Teixeirinha 40'; Albella 55'	Report	Huguinho 70'

Estadio do Pacaembu, São Paulo
Aug 6

Palmeiras (São Paulo (state))	2–1	(Rio de Janeiro (state)) Vasco da Gama
Rodrigues 1'; Amorim 10'	Report	Chico 50'

Estadio do Pacaembu, São Paulo
Aug 9

Palmeiras (São Paulo (state))	1–0	(Rio de Janeiro (state)) Flamengo
Odair Titica	Report

Estadio do Pacaembu, São Paulo
Aug 10

São Paulo (São Paulo (state))	4–0	(Rio de Janeiro (state)) Vasco
Albella 24', 39', 54'; Bibe 56'	Report

Estadio do Pacaembu, São Paulo
Aug 15

São Paulo (São Paulo (state))	1–1	(São Paulo (state)) Palmeiras
Mauro 65'	Report	Amorim 38'

Estadio do Pacaembu, São Paulo

Flamengo (Rio de Janeiro (state))	v	(Rio de Janeiro (state)) Vasco da Gama
	Report

Estadio do Pacaembu, São Paulo

The final match was not played as São Paulo had secured the title

== Final standings ==
Team	Pts	P	W	D	L	GF	GA	GD
(São Paulo (state)) São Paulo	5	3	2	1	0	9	2	7
(São Paulo (state)) Palmeiras	5	3	2	1	0	4	2	2
(Rio de Janeiro (state)) Flamengo	0	2	0	0	2	1	5	-4
(Rio de Janeiro (state)) Vasco da Gama	0	2	0	0	2	1	6	-5

== Champion ==
1952 Taça Armando Arruda Pereira
(São Paulo (state))
São Paulo
1st title
