= 1954 in Brazilian football =

Football in Brazil
- Season: 1954

The following article presents a summary of the 1954 football (soccer) season in Brazil, which was the 53rd season of competitive football in the country.

== Torneio Rio-São Paulo ==
Final Standings

Position	Team	Points	Played	Won	Drawn	Lost	For	Against	Difference
1	Corinthians	14	9	7	0	2	17	11	6
2	Fluminense	13	9	6	1	2	18	8	10
3	Palmeiras	12	9	5	2	2	15	11	4
4	São Paulo	10	9	4	2	3	10	11	-1
5	Vasco da Gama	9	9	4	1	4	14	17	-3
6	Santos	8	9	4	0	5	16	15	1
7	Flamengo	7	9	3	1	5	10	14	-4
8	Portuguesa	6	9	3	0	6	17	19	-2
9	América	6	9	3	0	6	18	22	-4
10	Botafogo	6	9	2	1	6	17	24	-7

Corinthians declared as the Torneio Rio-São Paulo champions.

== State championship champions ==
State	Champion	State	Champion
Acre	Independência	Paraíba	Botafogo-PB
Alagoas	Ferroviário-AL	Paraná	Coritiba
Amapá	Macapá	Pernambuco	Náutico
Amazonas	América-AM	Piauí	River
Bahia	Bahia	Rio de Janeiro	Coroados
Ceará	Fortaleza	Rio de Janeiro (DF)	Flamengo
Espírito Santo	Santo Antônio	Rio Grande do Norte	ABC
Goiás	Goiânia	Rio Grande do Sul	Renner
Maranhão	Sampaio Corrêa	Rondônia	Moto Clube
Mato Grosso	Mixto	Santa Catarina	Caxias-SC
Minas Gerais	Atlético Mineiro	São Paulo	Corinthians
Pará	Remo	Sergipe	Confiança

== Other competition champions ==
Competition	Champion
Campeonato Brasileiro de Seleções Estaduais	São Paulo

== Brazil national team ==
The following table lists all the games played by the Brazil national football team in official competitions and friendly matches during 1954.

Date	Opposition	Result	Score	Brazil scorers	Competition
February 28, 1954	Chile	W	2-0	Baltazar (2)	World Cup Qualifying
March 7, 1954	Paraguay	W	1-0	Baltazar	World Cup Qualifying
March 14, 1954	Chile	W	1-0	Baltazar	World Cup Qualifying
March 21, 1954	Paraguay	W	4-1	Julinho (2), Baltazar, Maurinho	World Cup Qualifying
May 2, 1954	(Colombia) Colombian Combined Team	W	4-1	Rodrigues (2), Índio (2)	International Friendly (unofficial match)
May 9, 1954	(Colombia) Colombian Combined Team	W	2-0	Martinez (own goal), Baltazar	International Friendly (unofficial match)
June 16, 1954	Mexico	W	5-0	Baltazar, Didi, Pinga (2), Julinho	World Cup
June 19, 1954	Yugoslavia	D	1-1	Didi	World Cup
June 27, 1954	Hungary	L	2-4	Djalma Santos, Julinho	World Cup
