= Bauru Atlético Clube =

Bauru
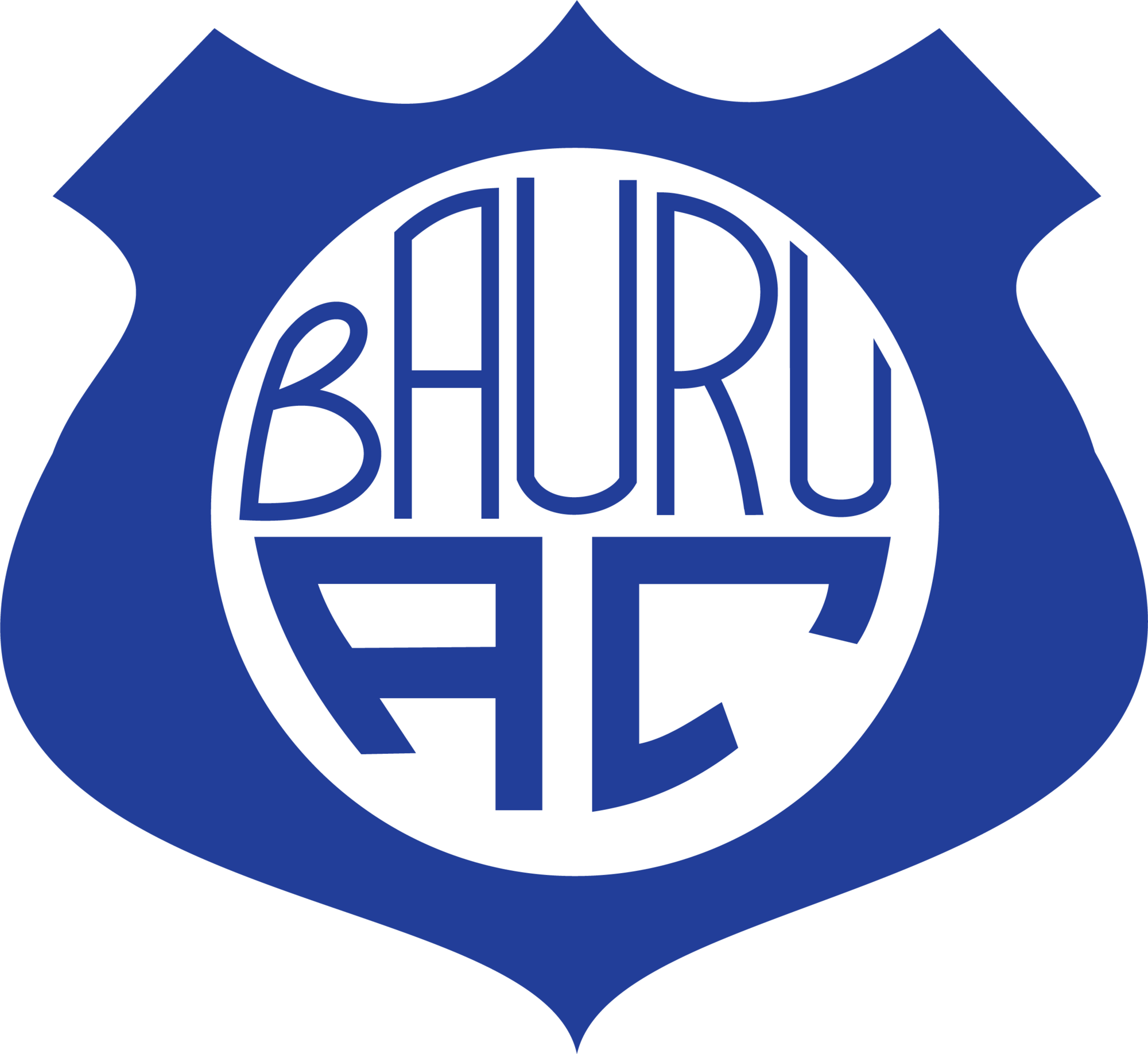
- Full name: Bauru Atlético Clube
- Nicknames: BAC; Baquinho
- Founded: 1 May 1919; 107 years ago
- Ground: Arena Lusitana

Bauru Atlético Clube, commonly known as Bauru, was a Brazilian football club based in Bauru, São Paulo.

== History ==
The club was founded on 1 May 1919, as Luzitana Futebol Clube. Bauru won the Campeonato Paulista do Interior de Futebol in 1946 when Pelé's father Dondinho was part of the winning squad. Pelé started his career playing for Bauru Youth. After Pelé left the club, Bauru folded in the 1960s.

== Stadium ==
Bauru Atlético Clube played their home games at Arena Lusitana.

== Honours ==
- Campeonato Paulista Série A2
  - Winners (1): 1946
