= 1927 in Brazilian football =

Football in Brazil
- Season: 1927

The following article presents a summary of the 1927 football (soccer) season in Brazil, which was the 26th season of competitive football in the country.

== Campeonato Paulista ==
In 1927 there were two different editions of the Campeonato Paulista. One was organized by the Associação Paulista de Esportes Atléticos (APEA) while the other one was organized by the Liga de Amadores de Futebol (LAF).

=== APEA's Campeonato Paulista ===
Final Stage

| Position | Team | Points | Played | Won | Drawn | Lost | For | Against | Difference |
|---|---|---|---|---|---|---|---|---|---|
| 1 | Palestra Itália-SP | 29 | 16 | 14 | 1 | 1 | 89 | 22 | 67 |
| 2 | Santos | 28 | 16 | 14 | 0 | 2 | 100 | 33 | 67 |
| 3 | Corinthians | 24 | 16 | 12 | 0 | 4 | 60 | 32 | 28 |
| 4 | Guarani | 15 | 14 | 7 | 1 | 6 | 47 | 38 | 9 |

Palestra Itália-SP was declared APEA's Campeonato Paulista champion.

=== LAF's Campeonato Paulista ===
Final Standings

| Position | Team | Points | Played | Won | Drawn | Lost | For | Against | Difference |
|---|---|---|---|---|---|---|---|---|---|
| 1 | Paulistano | 15 | 9 | 6 | 3 | 0 | 30 | 7 | 23 |
| 2 | Hespanha | 13 | 9 | 6 | 1 | 2 | 23 | 16 | 7 |
| 3 | Paulista | 11 | 9 | 5 | 1 | 3 | 24 | 20 | 4 |
| 4 | AA São Bento | 11 | 9 | 5 | 1 | 3 | 17 | 11 | 6 |
| 5 | Germânia | 10 | 9 | 4 | 2 | 3 | 25 | 22 | 3 |
| 6 | AA Palmeiras | 8 | 9 | 3 | 2 | 4 | 15 | 23 | -8 |
| 7 | SC Internacional de São Paulo | 7 | 9 | 3 | 1 | 5 | 16 | 20 | -4 |
| 8 | Atlético Santista | 7 | 9 | 3 | 1 | 5 | 17 | 18 | -1 |
| 9 | Antártica | 5 | 9 | 2 | 1 | 6 | 16 | 33 | -17 |
| 10 | Sant'Anna | 3 | 9 | 1 | 1 | 7 | 8 | 21 | |

Paulistano was declared LAF's Campeonato Paulista champion.

== State championship champions ==
| State | Champion | State | Champion |
|---|---|---|---|
| Acre | - | Paraíba | Cabo Branco |
| Alagoas | CRB | Paraná | Coritiba |
| Amapá | - | Pernambuco | América-PE |
| Amazonas | Rio Negro | Piauí | - |
| Bahia | Clube Bahiano de Tênis | Rio de Janeiro | Gragoatá |
| Ceará | Fortaleza | Rio de Janeiro (DF) | Flamengo |
| Espírito Santo | América-ES | Rio Grande do Norte | América-RN |
| Goiás | - | Rio Grande do Sul | Internacional |
| Maranhão | Luso Brasileiro | Rondônia | - |
| Mato Grosso | - | Santa Catarina | Avaí |
| Minas Gerais | Atlético Mineiro | São Paulo | Palestra Itália-SP (by APEA); Paulistano (by LAF) |
| Pará | Paysandu | Sergipe | Sergipe |

== Other competition champions ==
| Competition | Champion |
|---|---|
| Campeonato Brasileiro de Seleções Estaduais | Rio de Janeiro (DF) |

== Brazil national team ==
The Brazil national football team did not play any matches in 1927.
