= C.A. Albion =

CA Albion
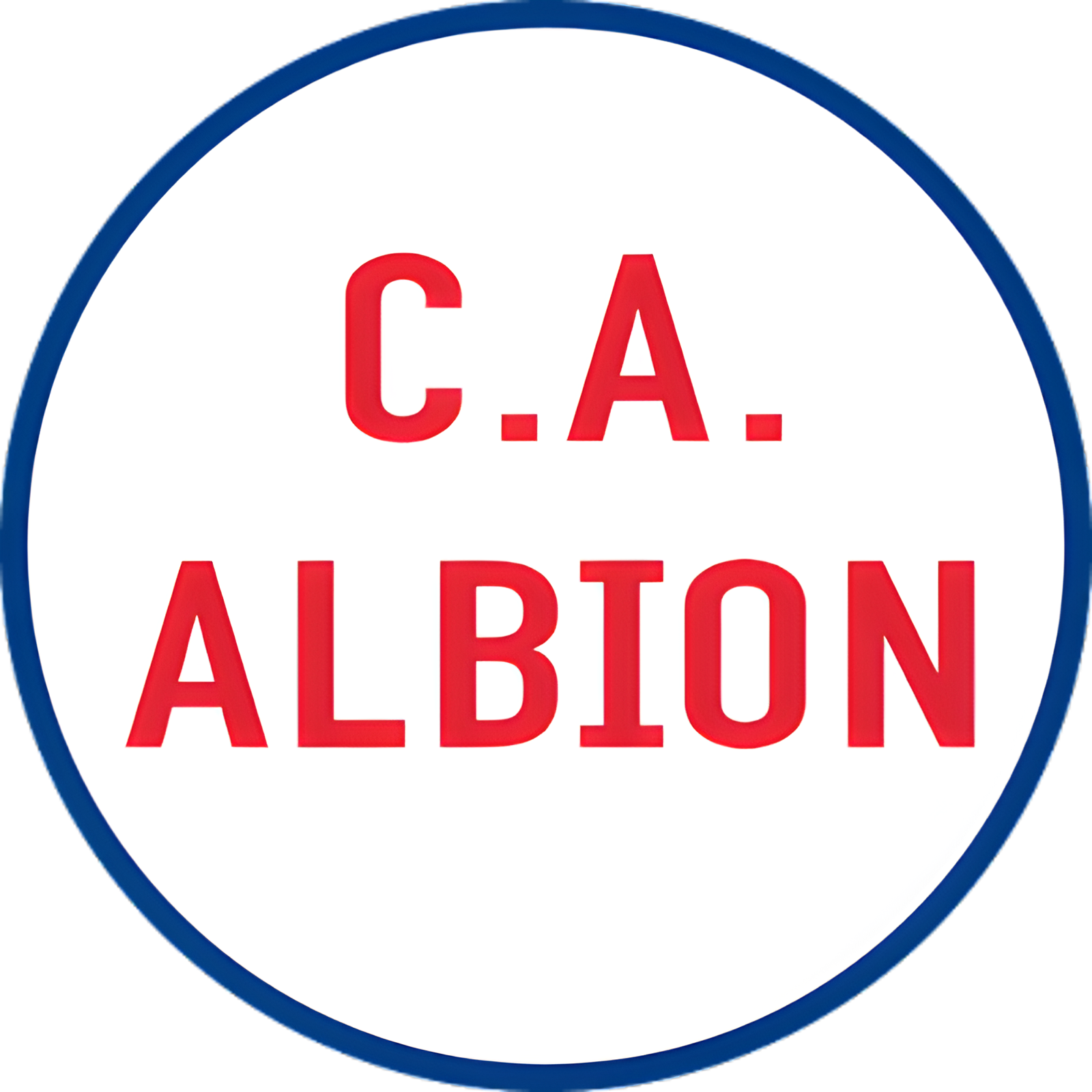
- Full name: Aassociação Athletica São Paulo Alpargatas (1921–1932); Club Athletico Albion (1932–1936)
- Nickname(s): English Team
- Founded: 1921
- Dissolved: 1936; 89 years ago
- Ground: Rua São Jorge
- League: Campeonato Paulista
Home colours

Club Athletico Albion, C. A. Albion or simply CA Albion was a Brazilian football club based in São Paulo. The club won one Campeonato Paulista First Division in 1933 and three Second Division titles, before being dissolved in 1936.

== History ==
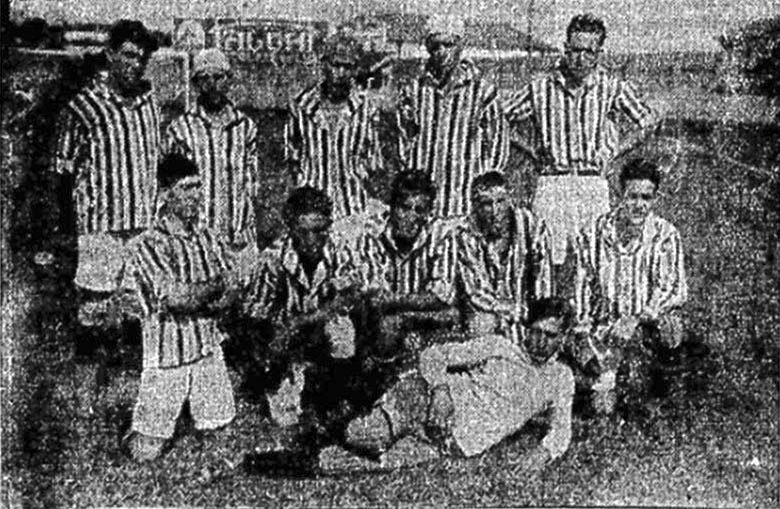
A team of 1927

Founded in 1921 as "Associação Athletica São Paulo Alpargatas", the name of the company where most of the team's players worked (São Paulo Alpargatas), and, in 1932, chose to change its name to "Club Athletico Albion", and acted as such until 1936, when the club abandoned the Campeonato Paulista during the dispute and was dissolved.

Their colors were red, blue and white. His main uniform was tricolor with narrow parallel vertical stripes, white shorts. It is currently extinct.

In 2021, the club had recognized the title of state champion, won in 1933. However, nothing remains of the club nowadays.

== Honours ==
- Campeonato Paulista
  - Winners (1): 1933
- Campeonato Paulista Série A2
  - Winner (3): 1931, 1932, 1935
