= 1952 in Brazilian football =

Football in Brazil
- Season: 1952

The following article presents a summary of the 1952 football (soccer) season in Brazil, which was the 51st season of competitive football in the country.

== Torneio Rio-São Paulo ==
Final Standings

Position	Team	Points	Played	Won	Drawn	Lost	For	Against	Difference
1	Portuguesa	11	9	5	1	3	23	16	7
2	Vasco da Gama	11	9	4	3	2	15	14	1
3	Corinthians	10	9	5	0	4	21	15	6
4	Fluminense	10	9	4	2	3	20	17	3
5	Santos	10	9	5	0	4	20	19	1
6	Botafogo	8	9	3	2	4	13	13	0
7	São Paulo	8	9	3	2	4	15	18	-3
8	Palmeiras	8	9	3	2	4	12	15	-3
9	Bangu	8	9	2	4	3	19	25	-6
10	Flamengo	6	9	2	2	5	14	20	-6

Championship playoff

June 15, 1952

Portuguesa	4–2	Vasco da Gama

June 19, 1952

Vasco da Gama	2–2	Portuguesa

Portuguesa declared as the Torneio Rio-São Paulo champions.

== State championship champions ==
State	Champion	State	Champion
Acre	Atlético Acreano	Paraíba	Red Cross
Alagoas	CSA	Paraná	Coritiba
Amapá	Trem	Pernambuco	Náutico
Amazonas	América-AM	Piauí	River
Bahia	Bahia	Rio de Janeiro	Adrianino
Ceará	Ferroviário-CE	Rio de Janeiro (DF)	Vasco
Espírito Santo	Vitória-ES	Rio Grande do Norte	América-RN
Goiás	Goiânia	Rio Grande do Sul	Internacional
Maranhão	Vitória do Mar	Rondônia	Ferroviário-RO
Mato Grosso	Mixto	Santa Catarina	América-SC
Minas Gerais	Atlético Mineiro	São Paulo	Corinthians
Pará	Remo	Sergipe	Cotingüiba

== Other competition champions ==
Competition	Champion
Campeonato Brasileiro de Seleções Estaduais	São Paulo

== Brazilian clubs in international competitions ==
Team	Copa Rio 1953
Corinthians	Runner-up
Fluminense	Champions

== Brazil national team ==
The following table lists all the games played by the Brazil national football team in official competitions and friendly matches during 1952.

Date	Opposition	Result	Score	Brazil scorers	Competition
April 6, 1952	Mexico	W	2-0	Baltazar (2)	Panamerican Championship
April 10, 1952	Peru	D	0-0	-	Panamerican Championship
April 13, 1952	Panama	W	5-0	Pinga, Julinho, Baltazar, Rodrigues (2)	Panamerican Championship
April 16, 1952	Uruguay	W	4-2	Baltazar, Rodrigues, Didi, Pinga	Panamerican Championship
April 20, 1952	Chile	W	3-0	Ademir Menezes (2), Pinga	Panamerican Championship
