= Corinthians Futebol Clube =

Corinthians de Santo André
- Full name: Corinthians Futebol Clube de Santo André
- Nickname: Galo Preto da Vila Alzira (Black rooster of Vila Alzira)
- Founded: 15 August 1912; 113 years ago
- Stadium: Américo Guazelli
| Home colours | Away colours |

Corinthians Futebol Clube de Santo André, commonly known as Corinthians de Santo André or Corinthinhas, is a Brazilian sports club based in Santo André, São Paulo.

It was founded on 15 August 1912, under the name Corinthians Foot-Ball Club. At that point, the team was known as "Corinthians de São Bernardo", since Santo André was a district of São Bernardo do Campo. In 1938, when the city of Santo André was emancipated from São Bernardo do Campo, the club became known as "Corinthians de Santo André."

The team played 12 editions of the São Paulo football championship for the second, third, and fourth divisions and disputed one season in the São Paulo top flight, in the 1927 APEA championship. Currently, it only contests amateur championships.

== History ==
Like the Sport Club Corinthians Paulista, the name of the team of Santo André also arose due to the Corinthian Football Club, the English team that toured Brazil. Among the founders the two final proposals of name were Flor da Índia and Corinthians. The first team was formed by João, Túlio, Manetti, Polesi and Veronesi, Jacomo and Américo, Paulista, Cortez, Severino and Carmine.

The first match and goal of Pelé was against Corinthians de Santo André, in a friendly match of celebration of the Independence, on 7 September 1956.

== Honours ==
- Campeonato Paulista Série A2
  - Winner (1): 1939
