= Armandinho (footballer) =

Brazilian footballer (1911–1972)

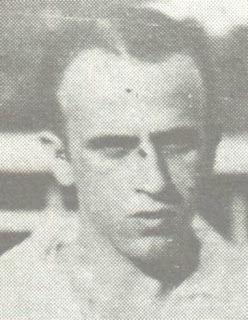

Personal information
- Full name: Armando dos Santos Silva
- Date of birth: June 3, 1911
- Place of birth: São Carlos, Brazil
- Date of death: 26 May 1972 (aged 60)
- Height: 1.75 m (5 ft 9 in)
- Position: Striker

Senior career*
Years	Team	Apps	(Gls)
1930–1923	Paulista		
1926	Pirassunungense		
1927–1928	Ponte Preta		
1929	Palestra Itália		
1930–1934	São Paulo da Floresta		
1934–1935	Botafogo		
1935	Independente-SP		
1935	Bahia		
1935	São Cristóvão		
1936	Portuguesa		
1936 e 1938–1940	São Paulo		
1938–1940	Portuguesa Santista		
1939	Bahia		
1940–1942	São Paulo		
1941	Santos		
1942	Comercial-SP		

International career
1934	Brazil		
- * Club domestic league appearances and goals

Armando (Armandinho) dos Santos Silva (June 3, 1911 in São Carlos – May 26, 1972 in Santos) was an association football player who played for Brazil national team.
