= Amparo, São Paulo =

Amparo
- Municipality
- Municipality of Amparo
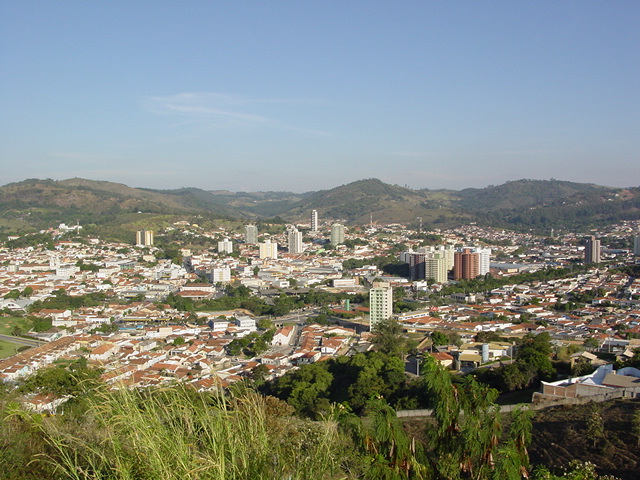
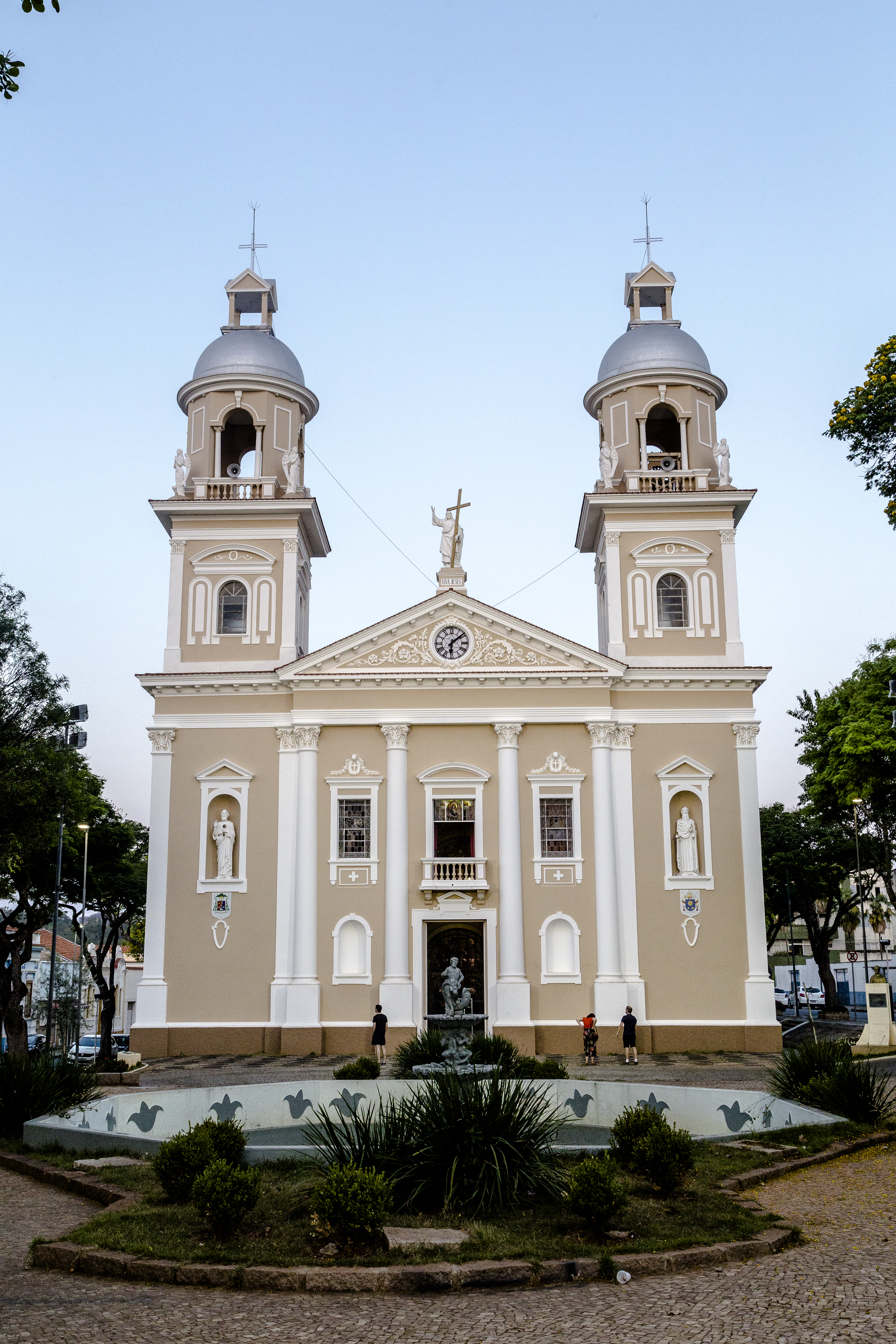
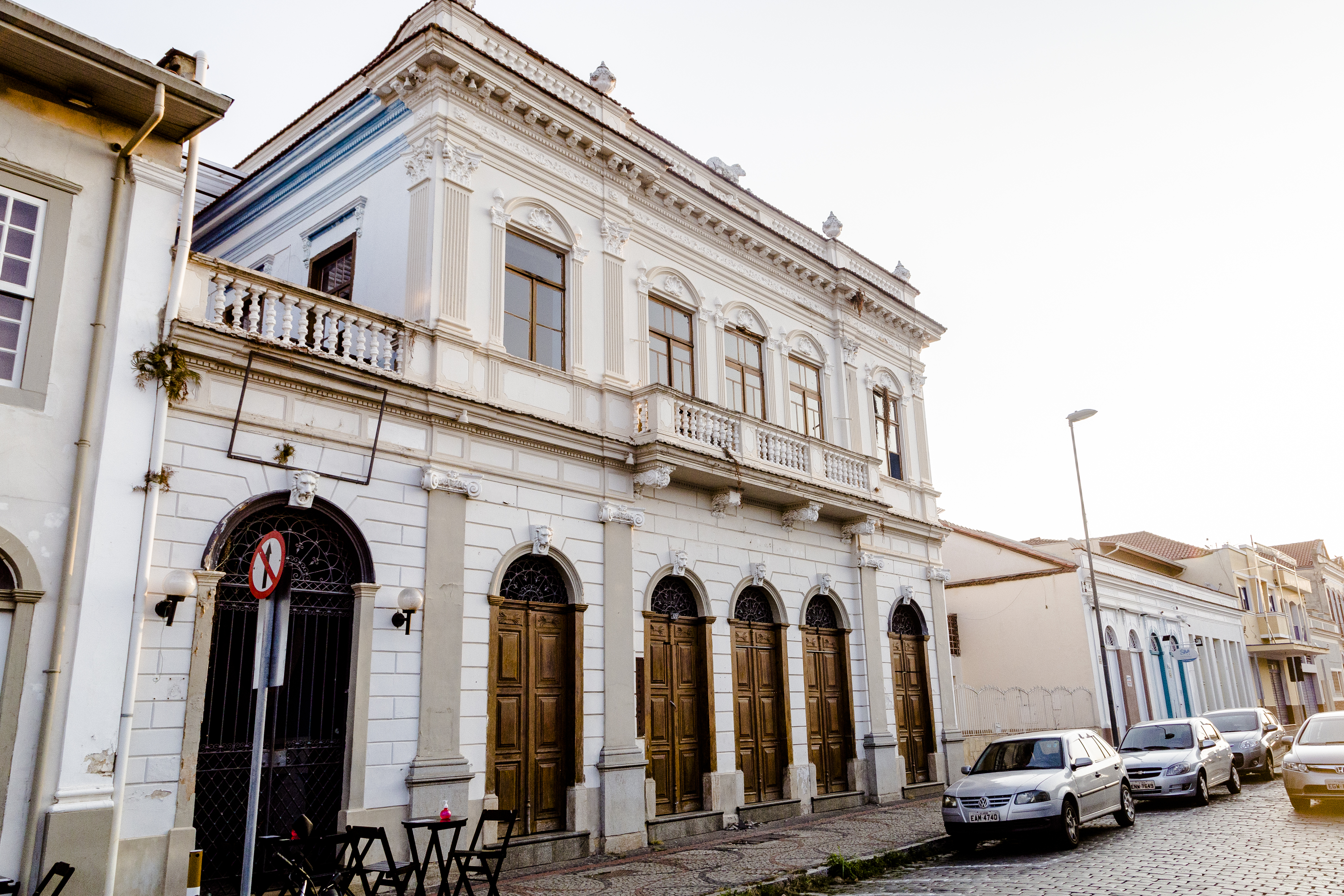
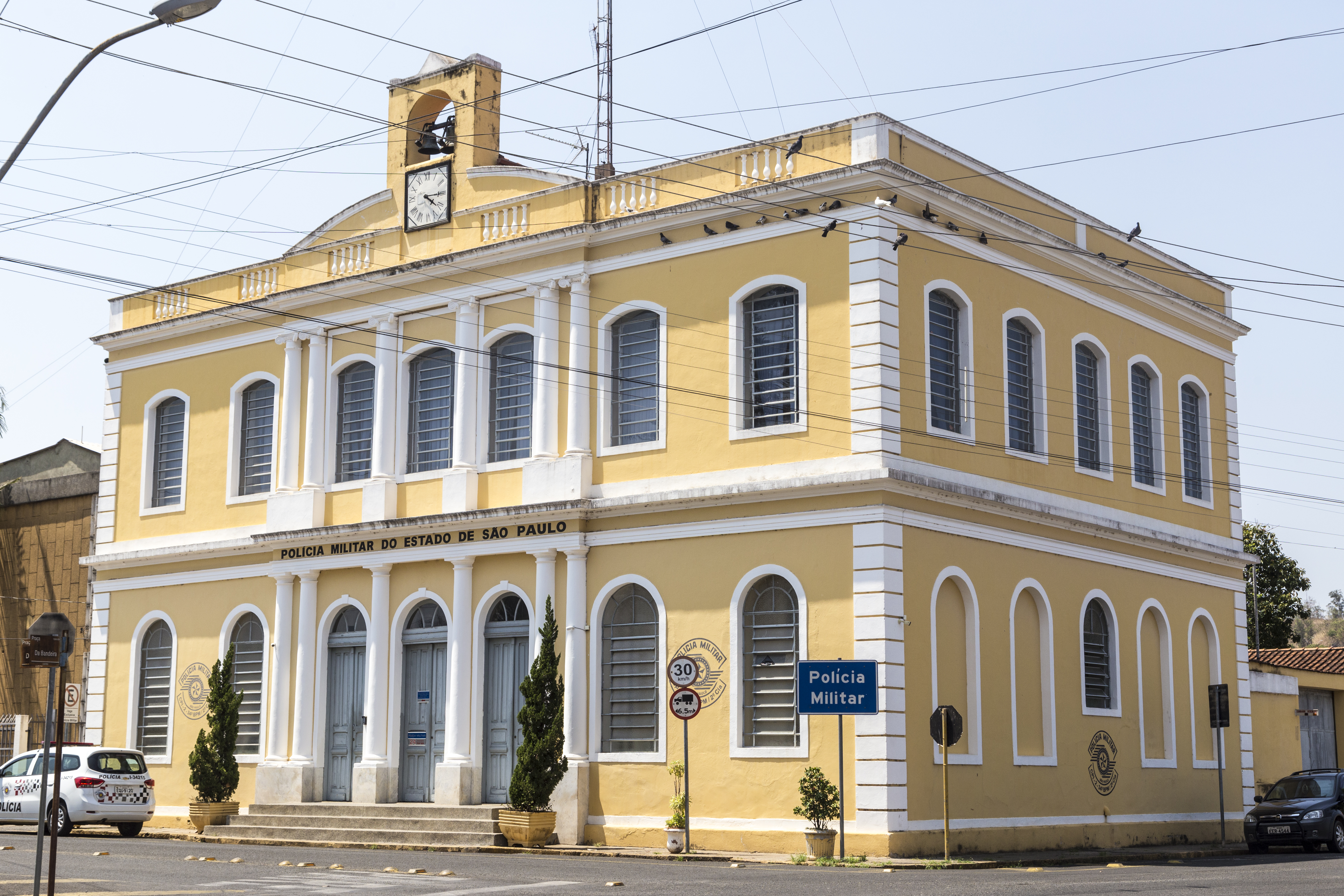
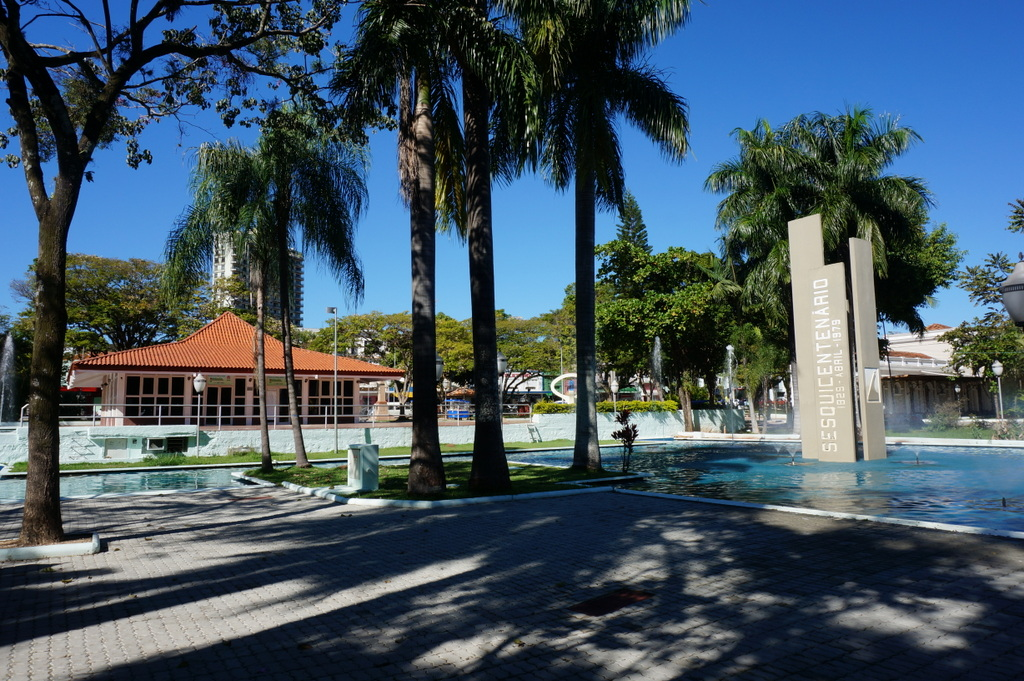
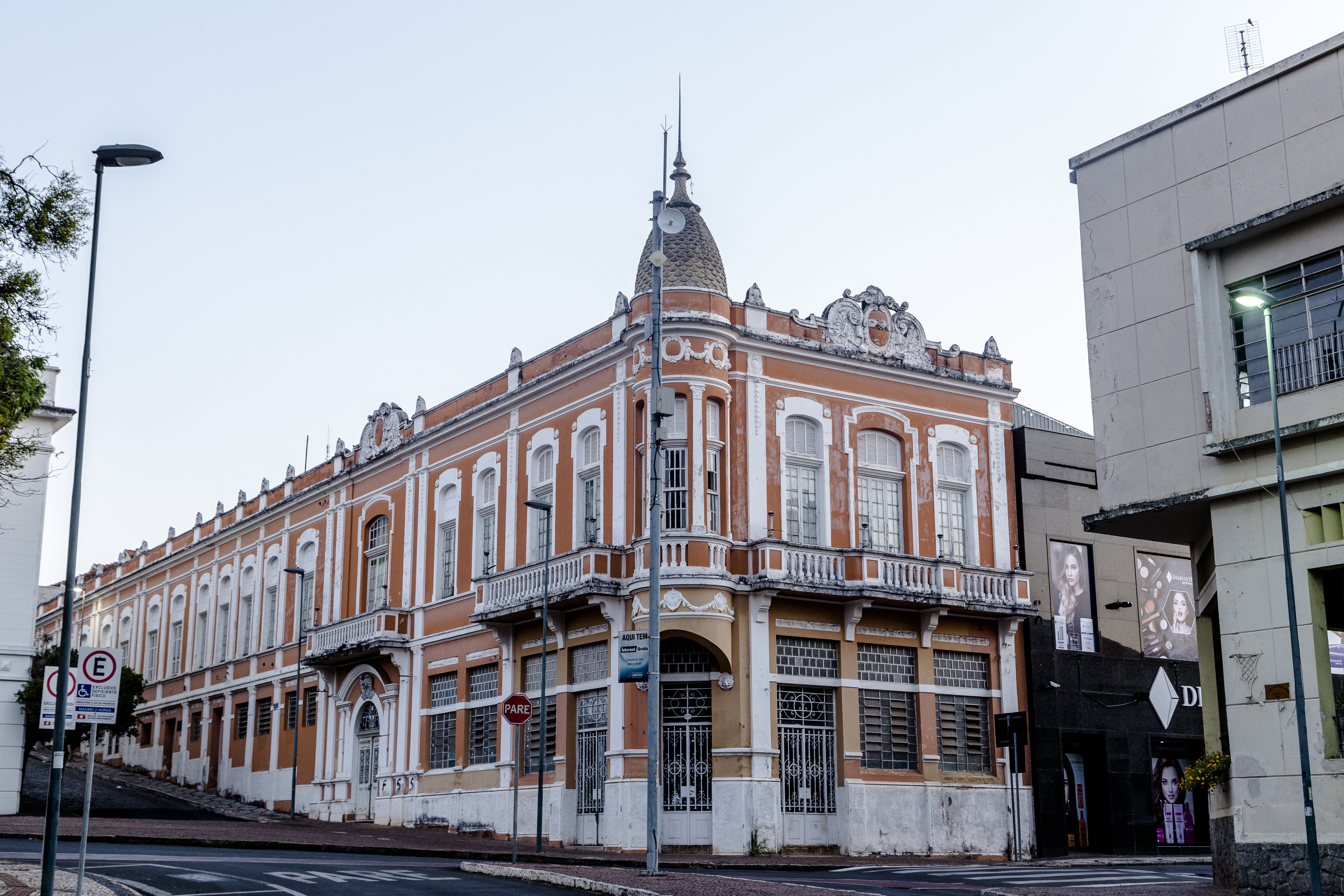
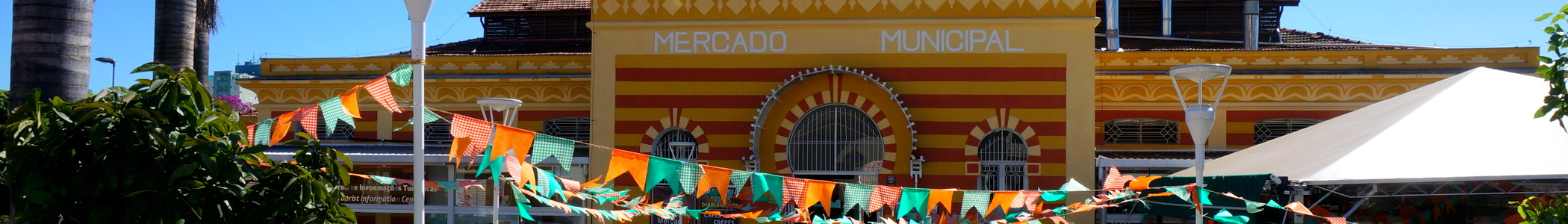

- Flag Coat of arms

- Location in São Paulo state

- Location in Brazil
- Coordinates: 22°42′11″S 46°45′54″W
- Country: Brazil
- Region: Southeast
- State: São Paulo
- Founded: April 8, 1829

Area
  - Total: 445 km^{2} (172 sq mi)

Population (2022)
  - Total: 68.008
  - Density: 152.72/km^{2} (395.5/sq mi)
- Time zone: UTC−3 (BRT)
- HDI (2010): 0.785 – high
- Website: amparo.sp.gov.br

Amparo is a Brazilian municipality in the state of São Paulo. The population is of 72,677 (2020 est.) in an area of 445 km^{2} (172 sq mi).

The city is part of the "Water-Circuit", a cluster of towns in São Paulo state which are famous for natural fountains and water wells. One of the main events in the city is the Winter Festival, when some stages are set over the main plaza and presentations are scheduled for the whole month of July. A variety of music bands and artists are invited to the city, from sertanejo (a Brazilian form of country music) and heavy metal to Ballet. Although the event is more dedicated to the city local residents, it attracts tourists from other regions.

Amparo is located about 50 kilometers from Campinas and 120 kilometers from São Paulo.

== Demographics ==
Historical population (municipality)
Year	Population	%±
1920	47,713
1940	35,239	−26.1%
1950	26,965	−23.5%
1960	28,636	6.2%
1970	31,908	11.4%
1980	41,603	30.4%
1991	50,797	22.1%
2000	60,404	18.9%
2010	65,829	9.0%
2022	68,008	3.3%

== Media ==
In telecommunications, the city was served by Companhia Telefônica Brasileira until 1973, when it began to be served by Telecomunicações de São Paulo. In July 1998, this company was acquired by Telefónica, which adopted the Vivo brand in 2012.

The company is currently an operator of cell phones, fixed lines, internet (fiber optics/4G) and television (satellite and cable).

== Religion ==
Christianity is present in the city as follows:

=== Catholic Church ===
The Catholic church in the municipality is part of the Roman Catholic Diocese of Amparo.

=== Protestant Church ===
The most diverse evangelical beliefs are present in the city, mainly Pentecostal, including the Assemblies of God in Brazil (the largest evangelical church in the country), Christian Congregation in Brazil, among others. These denominations are growing more and more throughout Brazil.

== Climate ==
Climate data for Amparo, elevation 1,006 m (3,301 ft), (2009–2020 normals, extremes 2008–2014)
Month	Jan	Feb	Mar	Apr	May	Jun	Jul	Aug	Sep	Oct	Nov	Dec	Year
Record high °C (°F)	34.0 (93.2)	34.9 (94.8)	31.7 (89.1)	30.2 (86.4)	28.8 (83.8)	27.2 (81.0)	28.6 (83.5)	32.0 (89.6)	32.3 (90.1)	36.0 (96.8)	33.0 (91.4)	36.0 (96.8)	36.0 (96.8)
Mean daily maximum °C (°F)	27.5 (81.5)	28.3 (82.9)	27.5 (81.5)	26.2 (79.2)	23.8 (74.8)	23.0 (73.4)	23.6 (74.5)	24.8 (76.6)	27.1 (80.8)	27.4 (81.3)	27.0 (80.6)	27.7 (81.9)	26.2 (79.1)
Daily mean °C (°F)	22.3 (72.1)	23.0 (73.4)	22.3 (72.1)	20.8 (69.4)	18.5 (65.3)	17.2 (63.0)	18.0 (64.4)	18.6 (65.5)	20.8 (69.4)	21.5 (70.7)	21.5 (70.7)	22.5 (72.5)	20.6 (69.0)
Mean daily minimum °C (°F)	17.0 (62.6)	17.6 (63.7)	17.0 (62.6)	15.4 (59.7)	13.2 (55.8)	11.5 (52.7)	12.4 (54.3)	12.3 (54.1)	14.4 (57.9)	15.7 (60.3)	16.0 (60.8)	17.3 (63.1)	15.0 (59.0)
Record low °C (°F)	13.0 (55.4)	14.0 (57.2)	12.5 (54.5)	9.9 (49.8)	7.0 (44.6)	4.9 (40.8)	4.1 (39.4)	3.6 (38.5)	5.1 (41.2)	8.1 (46.6)	8.9 (48.0)	12.8 (55.0)	3.6 (38.5)
Average precipitation mm (inches)	232.9 (9.17)	163.0 (6.42)	149.7 (5.89)	73.4 (2.89)	58.5 (2.30)	61.9 (2.44)	40.2 (1.58)	31.0 (1.22)	58.7 (2.31)	91.2 (3.59)	171.9 (6.77)	187.1 (7.37)	1,319.5 (51.95)
Average precipitation days (≥ 1.0 mm)	18.7	14.3	16.3	11.2	10.0	9.0	6.1	6.3	7.8	11.7	14.5	17.9	143.8
Source: Centro Integrado de Informações Agrometeorológicas

== See also ==
- List of municipalities in the state of São Paulo by population
- Interior of São Paulo
