= C.E. América =

CE América
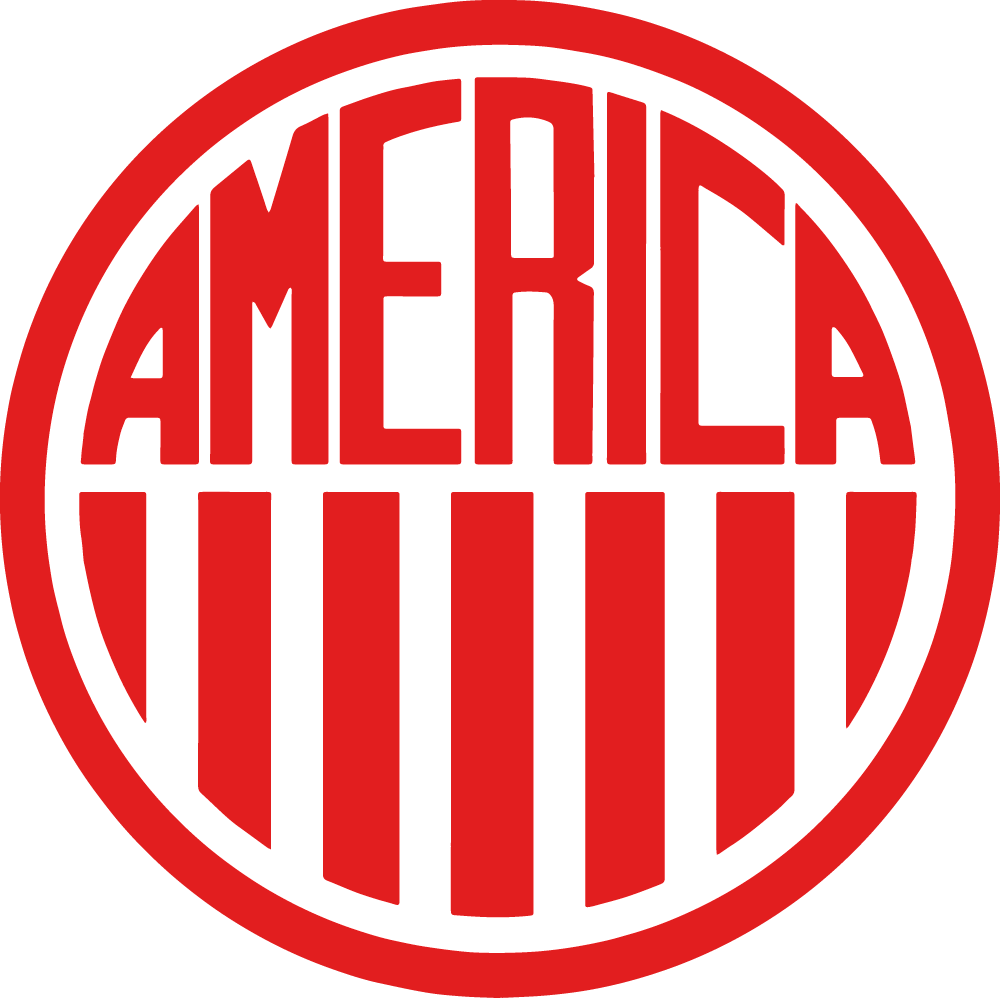
- Full name: Foot-Ball Club Flor do Ypiranga (1914–1922); Clube Atlético Siléx (1923–1929); Clube Esportivo América (1930–1945)
- Founded: 1914
- Dissolved: 1945
- League: Campeonato Paulista
Home colours

Clube Esportivo América, C. E. América or simply CE América was a football club based in São Paulo, Brazil. Founded in 1914 as Foot-Ball Club Flor do Ypiranga, the club changed its name in 1923, now becoming the Clube Atlético Siléx. It was as CA Siléx that he disputed the Campeonato Paulista on three occasions: 1926, 1927 and 1929. In 1930 it changed its name again to Clube Esportivo América, in honor of the America Football Club of Rio de Janeiro. The club abandoned football in 1931, returning to play in the FPFA championships in the 1940s. It closed down definitively in 1945.

== Honours ==
- Campeonato Paulista Série A2
  - Winners (3): 1925, 1928, 1943
- Campeonato Paulista Série A3
  - Winners (1): 1941
