= Associação Atlética República =

República
- Full name: Associação Atlética República
- Nicknames: República da Aclimação; Centenária
- Founded: 23 January 1914; 111 years ago
- Ground: Estádio Jack Marin
- League: Campeonato Paulista
Home colours	Away colours

Associação Atlética República, República da Aclimação or simply República is a football club based in Aclimação, São Paulo, Brazil. It disputed the APEA (Portuguese: Associação Paulista de Esportes Atléticos) championships since 1919, participating in the first division of the Campeonato Paulista in 1927, and for the FPF in 1933 and 1934.

República also participated in the first match with night lighting that is recorded in history, against SE Linhas e Cabos (São Paulo Light Company employees' club), at Rua do Glicério, where 20 electric tram headlights were used to illuminate the playing field, on June 23, 1923.

The club maintains its activities to these days, playing only as an amateur level.

== Honours ==
- Campeonato Paulista Série A3
  - Winners (1): 1924 (APEA)
