= 1989 Copa Pelé squads =

These are the squads for the national teams participated in the II Mundialito de Seniors held in Brazil, in 1989. The tournament was played in a round robin format with Brazil being the winners of this first edition.

== Group ==
=== Brazil ===
Head coach: Luciano do Valle

No.	Pos.	Player	Date of birth (age)	Caps	Club
1	GK	Ado	4 July 1946 (aged 42)	3	(Brazil) Retired
2	DF	Eurico	3 April 1948 (aged 40)	2	(Brazil) Retired
3	DF	Luís Pereira	21 June 1949 (aged 39)	32	(Brazil) Central de Cotia
4	DF	Amaral	25 December 1954 (aged 34)	32	(Brazil) Retired
5	MF	Mário Sérgio	7 September 1950 (aged 38)	8	(Brazil) Retired
6	DF	Wladimir	29 August 1954 (aged 34)	7	(Brazil) Santos
7	MF	Cafuringa	10 November 1948 (aged 40)	-	(Brazil) Retired
8	MF	Batista	8 March 1955 (aged 33)	38	(Brazil) Avaí
9	FW	Cláudio Adão	2 July 1955 (aged 33)	-	(Brazil) Corinthians
10	MF	Rivellino (c)	1 January 1946 (aged 43)	92	(Brazil) Retired
11	MF	Lola	2 January 1950 (aged 39)	-	(Brazil) Retired
14	DF	Jayme de Almeida	17 May 1953 (aged 35)	1	(Brazil) Retired
13	MF	Marco Aurélio	10 February 1952 (aged 36)	-	(Brazil) Retired
16	FW	Chico Spina	16 June 1955 (aged 33)	-	(Brazil) Retired
15	FW	Edu	6 August 1949 (aged 39)	42	(Brazil) Retired
20	FW	Nunes	20 March 1954 (aged 34)	6	(Brazil) Tiburones Acajutla
21	MF	Rocha	28 October 1958 (aged 30)	-	(Brazil) Esporte Clube XV de Novembro (Piracicaba)
22	MF	Zenon	31 March 1954 (aged 34)	5	(Brazil) Guarani

Players who were called up but did travel to said tournament:*(N°12)GK

- (N°17)FW *(N°18)MF *(N°19)DF *(N°23)GK

=== West Germany ===
Head coach:

No.	Pos.	Player	Date of birth (age)	Caps	Club
1	GK	Wolfgang Kleff	16 November 1946 (aged 42)	6	(West Germany) SV 19 Straelen
5	DF	Franz Beckenbauer	11 September 1945 (aged 43)	104	(West Germany) Retired
18	MF	Wolfgang Sidka	26 May 1954 (aged 34)	-	(West Germany) Tennis Borussia Berlin
7	MF	Wolfgang Overath	28 September 1943 (aged 45)	81	(West Germany) Retired

Players who were called up but did travel to said tournament:*(N°2)DF *(N°3)DF *(N°4)MF *(N°6)DF *(N°8)FW *(N°9)FW *(N°10)MF *(N°11)MF *(N°12)GK *(N°13)FW *(N°14)MF *(N°15)DF *(N°16)FW *(N°17)DF *(N°18)MF *(N°19)FW *(N°20)MF *(N°21)GK *(N°22)MF *(N°23)DF

=== Italy ===
Head coach: Cesare Rovatti.

No.	Pos.	Player	Date of birth (age)	Caps	Club
1	GK	Enrico Albertosi	2 November 1939 (aged 49)	34	(Italy) Retired
2	DF	Francesco Morini	12 August 1944 (aged 44)	11	(Italy) Retired
21	DF	Alberto Tarantini (ARG)	3 December 1955 (aged 33)	61	(Switzerland) FC St. Gallen
20	FW	Paolo Rossi	23 September 1956 (aged 32)	48	(Italy) Retired
9	FW	Francesco Graziani	16 December 1952 (aged 36)	64	(Italy) Retired

Players who were called up but did not travel to said tournament:*(N°3)DF *(N°4)DF *(N°5)MF *(N°6)DF *(N°7)MF *(N°8)FW *(N°9)FW *(N°10)MF *(N°11)FW *(N°12)GK *(N°13)DF *(N°14)FW *(N°15)MF *(N°16)DF *(N°17)GK *(N°18)FW *(N°19)DF *(N°20)MF *(N°21)FW *(N°22)MF *(N°23)DF

=== Uruguay ===
Head coach: Hector Nuñez Bello.

No.	Pos.	Player	Date of birth (age)	Caps	Club: (N°1)Nilson Bertinat GK 16/12/1948
1	GK	Nilson Bertinat	16 December 1948 (aged 40)	n/a	(Uruguay) Retired
6	DF	Mario González	27 May 1950 (aged 38)	0	(Uruguay) Retired
7	FW	Wilmar Cabrera	31 July 1959 (aged 29)	36	(Argentina) Deportivo Mandiyú
14	DF	Néstor Montelongo	20 February 1955 (aged 33)	36	(Uruguay) Retired
5	DF	Juan Vicente Morales	18 April 1956 (aged 32)	15	(Uruguay) Retired
8	MF	Alberto Cardaccio	28 August 1949 (aged 39)	19	(Uruguay) Retired
9	FW	Jorge Siviero	13 May 1952 (aged 36)	1	(Uruguay) Retired
20	DF	Juan Carlos Blanco	25 May 1946 (aged 42)	10	(Uruguay) Retired
4	DF	Pablo Forlán	14 July 1945 (aged 43)	17	(Uruguay) Retired
10	FW	Rogelio Nestor Ramirez	8 April 1959 (aged 27)	3	(Uruguay) Retired
11	FW	Alberto Bica	11 February 1958 (aged 28)	9	(Uruguay) Retired
15	MF	Pedro Rocha	3 December 1942 (aged 44)	52	(Uruguay) Retired
19	FW	Fernando Morena	2 February 1952 (aged 36)	53	(Uruguay) Retired
21	MF	Jorge Yañes	Missing required parameter 1=month! (aged 0)	2	(Uruguay) Retired
22	MF	César Abel Roux Larrosa	23 November 1951 (aged 37)	m/a	(Uruguay) Retired

Players who were called up but did travel to said tournament:

=== Great Britain ===
Head coach:

No.	Pos.	Player	Date of birth (age)	Caps	Club
1	GK	Joe Corrigan	18 November 1948 (aged 40)	9	(England) Retired
2	DF	Martin Buchan	6 March 1949 (aged 39)	34	(Scotland) Retired
3	DF	Alan Kennedy	31 August 1954 (aged 34)	2	(England) Northwich Victoria
4	MF	Terry McDermott	8 September 1951 (aged 37)	25	(England) Retired
5	DF	Kenny Burns	23 September 1953 (aged 35)	20	(England) Grantham Town
7	MF	Dennis Mortimer	5 April 1952 (aged 36)	-	(England) Retired
9	FW	Frank Worthington	23 November 1948 (aged 40)	8	(England) Retired
10	MF	Alan Whittle	10 March 1950 (aged 38)	-	(England) Retired
11	FW	Gordon Hill	1 April 1954 (aged 34)	6	(England) Retired
12	FW	David Johnson	23 October 1951 (aged 37)	8	(England) Retired
8	MF	Mick Bates	10 September 1947 (aged 41)	-	(England) Retired
14	FW	Peter Osgood	20 February 1947 (aged 41)	4	(England) Retired
18	FW	Duncan McKenzie	10 June 1950 (aged 38)	-	(England) Retired

Players who were called but did travel to said tournament:*(N°6)DF *(N°13)GK

- (N°15)FW
- (N°16)DF *(N°17)FW *(N°18)MF *(N°19)GK *(N°20)FW *(N°21)DF *(N°22)MF *(N°23)FW

== Sources ==
- SELEÇÃO BRASILEIRA DE SENIORS/MASTERS 1987-1995
- Copa Pelé: la Copa del Mundo de veteranos de la que Uruguay fue constante animador
- Problemas de organización marcan el inicio de la Copa Pelé
- Luciano do Valle, técnico de Pelé, Rivellino e Zico na Seleção: relembre o Mundialito de masters
- Copa Pelé (Coupe du Monde des Vétérans)
- LA COPA PELÉ, L’AUTRE COUPE DU MONDE
