= 1991 Copa Pelé squads =

These are the squads for the national teams who participated in the I World Cup of Masters held in the United States, between 19 and 27 January 1991. The tournament was played in two groups, with Brazil beating Argentina by 2-1 in the final.

== Group A ==
=== Italy ===
Head coach:

No.	Pos.	Player	Date of birth (age)	Caps	Club
1	GK	Ivano Bordon	13 April 1951 (aged 39)	-	(Italy) Retired
2	DF	Silvano Fontolan	24 February 1955 (aged 35)	-	(Italy) Retired
6	DF	Claudio Gentile	27 September 1953 (aged 37)	71	(Italy) Retired
13	MF	Roberto Filippi	30 July 1948 (aged 42)	-	(Italy) Retired
15	FW	Franco Causio	1 February 1949 (aged 41)	63	(Italy) Retired
18	FW	Alessandro Altobelli	28 November 1955 (aged 35)	61	(Italy) Retired
19	FW	Francesco Graziani	16 December 1952 (aged 38)	64	(Italy) Retired
11	FW	Roberto Pruzzo	1 April 1955 (aged 35)	6	(Italy) Retired
20	FW	Paolo Rossi	23 September 1956 (aged 34)	48	(Italy) Retired

Players who called up but did travel to said tournament:*(N°3)DF *(N°4)MF *(N°5)DF *(N°7)FW *(N°8)MF *(N°9)FW *(N°10)MF *(N°12)GK *(N°14)MF *(N°16)DF *(N°17)MF *(N°21)FW *(N°22)GK *(N°23)MF

=== Germany ===
Head coach:

No.	Pos.	Player	Date of birth (age)	Caps	Club
1	GK	Bernd Jakubowski	10 December 1952 (aged 38)	-	(East Germany) Retired
3	MF	Paul Breitner	5 September 1951 (aged 39)	48	(West Germany) Retired
8	MF	Bernhard Cullmann	1 November 1949 (aged 41)	40	(West Germany) Retired
11	FW	Karl-Heinz Rummenigge (c)	25 September 1955 (aged 35)	95	(West Germany) Retired
7	FW	Reiner Geye	22 November 1949 (aged 41)	4	(West Germany) Retired
9	FW	Wolfgang Kleff	16 November 1946 (aged 44)	6	(West Germany) SV 19 Straelen
10	MF	Rainer Bonhof	1 July 1952 (aged 38)	14	(West Germany) Retired
5	DF	Hans-Jürgen Dörner	25 January 1951 (aged 39)	96	(East Germany) Retired
18	FW	Herbert Zimmermann	29 March 1952 (aged 38)	53	(West Germany) Retired
15	FW	Werner Melzer	2 March 1954 (aged 36)	-	(West Germany) Retired
19	FW	Dieter Riedel	16 September 1947 (aged 43)	4	(East Germany) Retired
21	MF	Wolfgang Seel	21 June 1948 (aged 42)	6	(West Germany) Retired
16	DF	Karlheinz Förster	25 July 1958 (aged 32)	81	(West Germany) Retired

Players who were called up but did travel to said tournament:*(N°2)DF *(N°4)MF *(N°6)DF *(N°12)GK *(N°13)DF *(N°14)MF *(N°17)MF *(N°20)DF *(N°22)GK *(N°23)FW

=== Brazil ===
Head coach: Luciano do Valle

No.	Pos.	Player	Date of birth (age)	Caps	Club
1	GK	Paulo Sérgio	24 July 1953 (aged 37)	3	(Brazil) Retired
14	DF	Rosemiro Correia de Souza	22 February 1954 (aged 36)	26	(Brazil) Retired
3	DF	Luís Pereira	21 June 1949 (aged 41)	32	(Brazil) São Caetano
2	DF	Amaral	25 December 1954 (aged 36)	40	(Brazil) Retired
4	DF	Wladimir	29 August 1954 (aged 36)	5	(Brazil) Retired
7	FW	Cafuringa	10 November 1948 (aged 42)	-	(Brazil) Retired
15	MF	Rivellino (c)	1 January 1946 (aged 45)	92	(Brazil) Retired
10	MF	Zico	3 March 1953 (aged 37)	71	(Japan) Kashima Antlers
13	MF	Jayme de Almeida	17 May 1953 (aged 37)	1	(Brazil) Retired
8	MF	Batista	8 March 1955 (aged 35)	38	(Brazil) Retired
19	FW	Nílson Severino Dias	25 January 1952 (aged 38)	1	(Brazil) Retired
5	MF	Marco Aurélio	10 February 1952 (aged 38)	-	(Brazil) Retired
18	MF	Paulo Isidoro	3 August 1953 (aged 37)	36	(Brazil) Associação Atlética Internacional (Limeira)
11	FW	Roberto Dinamite	13 April 1954 (aged 36)	47	(Brazil) Campo Grande
16	DF	Eduardo Barbosa de Albuquerque	22 February 1943 (aged 47)	7	(Brazil) Retired
9	MF	Mário Sérgio	7 September 1950 (aged 40)	8	(Brazil) Retired
22	FW	César Coelho de Moraes	25 July 1954 (aged 36)	2	(Brazil) Retired
12	GK	Hélio Miguel Neneca	18 December 1947 (aged 43)	-	(Brazil) Retired
6	DF	Zenon de Souza Farias	31 March 1954 (aged 36)	5	(Brazil) São Bento
21	FW	Edu	6 August 1949 (aged 41)	42	(Brazil) Retired
17	FW	Serginho Chulapa	23 December 1953 (aged 37)	20	(Brazil) Portuguesa Santista

Players who were called up but did travel to said tournament:*(N°20) *(N°22)GK

== Group B ==
=== Argentina ===
Head coach: (Argentina) Carmelo Faraone

No.	Pos.	Player	Date of birth (age)	Caps	Club
1	GK	Hugo Gatti	19 August 1944 (aged 46)	18	(Argentina) Retired
2	DF	Orlando Luis Ruiz	4 May 1959 (aged 31)	n/a	(Argentina) Retired
4	DF	Víctor Bottaniz	12 May 1953 (aged 37)	n/a	(Argentina) Retired
20	MF	Enzo Bulleri	3 November 1956 (aged 34)	3	(Argentina) Retired
3	DF	Pablo Comelles	4 July 1954 (aged 36)	-	(Argentina) Retired
7	FW	Fernando Alí	10 May 1954 (aged 36)	0	(Argentina) Retired
8	MF	Miguel Ángel Colombatti	18 January 1956 (aged 35)	0	(Argentina) Retired
13	MF	Carlos Squeo	4 June 1948 (aged 42)	9	(Argentina) Retired
11	MF	Ricardo Villa	18 August 1952 (aged 38)	17	(Argentina) Retired
15	MF	Roberto Zywica	21 January 1947 (aged 43)	1	(Argentina) Retired
10	MF	Pedro Magallanes	14 June 1956 (aged 34)	-	(United States) FL Strikers
19	FW	Oscar Más	28 October 1946 (aged 44)	37	(Argentina) Retired
2	DF	Alberto Tarantini	3 December 1955 (aged 35)	60	(Argentina) Retired
16	FW	Mario Kempes	15 July 1954 (aged 36)	43	(Austria) Kremser SC
17	DF	Jorge Paolino	12 July 1949 (aged 41)	3	(Argentina) Retired

Players who were called up but did travel to said tournament:

=== Uruguay ===
Head coach: Juan Mujica

No.	Pos.	Player	Date of birth (age)	Caps	Club
1	GK	Lorenzo Carrabs	15 October 1954 (aged 36)	-	(Uruguay) Nacional Montevideo
2	DF	Néstor Montelongo	20 February 1955 (aged 35)	36	(Uruguay) Retired
3	DF	Rafael Villazan	20 February 1955 (aged 35)	-	(Uruguay) Bella Vista
4	DF	Pablo Forlán	14 July 1945 (aged 45)	17	(Uruguay) Retired
14	DF	Héctor Roux	2 February 1952 (aged 38)	8	(Uruguay) Retired
5	MF	Alberto Cardaccio	26 August 1952 (aged 38)	19	(Uruguay) Retired
10	FW	Julio Morales	26 February 1941 (aged 49)	24	(Uruguay) Retired
9	FW	Fernando Morena	2 February 1952 (aged 38)	53	(Uruguay) Retired
21	FW	Rudy Vicente Rodríguez	10 October 1952 (aged 38)	3	(Uruguay) Retired
11	MF	Hebert Revetria	27 August 1955 (aged 35)	3	(Uruguay) Retired
	DF	Juan Ahuntchaín (es)	15 January 1952 (aged 39)	n/a	(Uruguay) Retired
	MF	Pierino Lattuada (es)	16 April 1950 (aged 40)	n/a	(Uruguay) Retired
	FW	Rogelio Néstor Ramirez Bonvicini	8 April 1959 (aged 31)	3	(Uruguay) Retired
	FW	Juan Carlos Ocampo	12 February 1955 (aged 35)	6	(Uruguay) Retired
	GK	Jorge Fossati	22 November 1952 (aged 38)	3	(Uruguay) Retired

Players who were called up but did travel to said tournament:

=== England ===
Head coach:

No.	Pos.	Player	Date of birth (age)	Caps	Club
1	GK	Joe Corrigan	18 November 1948 (aged 42)	9	Retired
2	DF	Bobby Moore	12 April 1941 (aged 49)	108	Retired
3	DF	Mick Lyons	8 December 1951 (aged 39)	-	Retired
	DF	Trevor Cherry	23 February 1948 (aged 42)	27	Retired
5	MF	Alan Ainscow	15 July 1953 (aged 37)	-	Retired
	DF	Paul Power	30 October 1953 (aged 37)	0	Retired
	MF	Martin Peters	8 November 1943 (aged 47)	67	Retired
15	MF	Gordon Hill	1 April 1954 (aged 36)	6	(Canada) Nova Scotia Clippers
11	FW	Frank Worthington	23 November 1948 (aged 42)	8	(England) Hinckley Town
	MF	Gary Stanley	4 March 1954 (aged 36)	0	(England) Waterlooville

Players who were called up but did to said tournament:*(N°1)

== Sources ==
- Copa Pelé: la Copa del Mundo de veteranos de la que Uruguay fue constante animador
