= II Mundialito de Seniors =

1989 World Cup of Masters
Pele Cup '89

Tournament details
- Host country: Brazil
- Dates: 15 January – 2 February (15 days)
- Teams: 6 (from 2 confederations)
- Venues: 3 (in 1 host city)

Final positions
- Champions: Brazil (1st title)
- Runners-up: Uruguay
- Third place: Italy
- Fourth place: Argentina

Tournament statistics
- Matches played: 16
- Goals scored: 46 (2.88 per match)
- Top scorer: (Brazil) Cláudio Adão (7 goals)
- Best player: (Brazil) Cláudio Adão

II Mundialito de Seniors (also known as I Copa Pelé) was the second World Cup of Masters. This was an unsanctioned tournament, and players were not recognised with international caps. It was held, again, in January 1989 in Brazil. In this tournament there were six "Senior" teams, hosts Brazil, reigning champions Argentina, Italy, West Germany, Uruguay and for the only time a team representing Great Britain. The tournament pitted all teams against each other in a League, with the top two teams then playing each other in the final. Brazil won the event beating Uruguay 4-2 in the final.

== Results ==
15 January 1989

Argentina	1–2	Uruguay

São Paulo

Brazil	3–0	Great Britain
Nunes; Lola; Wladimir

Estádio do Canindé, São Paulo

16 January 1989

Italy	1–1	West Germany
Morini		Sidka

São Paulo

18 January 1989

Argentina	4–2	Great Britain

São Paulo

19 January 1989

Uruguay	1–0	West Germany

São Paulo

Brazil	1–1	Italy
Mário Sérgio		Graziani

São Paulo

22 January 1989

West Germany	1–2	Great Britain

São Paulo

Brazil	3–0	Argentina
Zenon; Batista; Cláudio Adão

São Paulo

24 January 1989

Italy	3–3	Uruguay

São Paulo

25 January 1989

Brazil	2–0	West Germany
Cláudio Adão; Nunes

São Paulo

26 January 1989

Argentina	1–0	Italy

São Paulo

Uruguay	2–1	Great Britain

São Paulo

29 January 1989

West Germany	5–1	Argentina

São Paulo

Great Britain	0–0	Italy

São Paulo

30 January 1989

Brazil	2–0	Uruguay
Cláudio Adão

São Paulo

== Group table ==
Team	Pld	W	D	L	GF	GA	GD	Pts
Brazil	5	4	1	0	11	1	+10	9
Uruguay	5	3	1	1	8	7	+1	7
Italy	5	0	4	1	5	6	-1	4
Argentina	5	2	0	3	7	12	-5	4
West Germany	5	1	1	3	7	7	0	3
(United Kingdom) Great Britain	5	1	1	3	5	10	-5	3

== Final ==
2 February 1989
21:00 UTC−6

Uruguay	2–4	Brazil
Siviero 70'; Cabrera 87'		Cláudio Adão 6', 45', 49'; Rivellino 75'

Estádio do Canindé, São Paulo
Attendance: 20,000
Referee: Walter Schneiller (West Germany)

Uruguay	Brazil

GK	1	Nilson Bertinat
DF	14	Néstor Montelongo
DF	20	Juan Carlos Blanco	Yellow card
DF	4	Pablo Forlán
DF	5	Juan Vicente Morales		(substituted off) 35'
MF	8	Alberto Cardaccio		(substituted off) 45'
DF	6	Mario González
FW	9	Jorge Luis Siviero
MF	21	Jorge Yañes	Yellow card
MF	7	Wilmar Cabrera (c)
FW	10	Rogelio Nestor Ramírez
FW	11	Alberto Bica
Substitutions:
FW	19	Fernando Morena		(substituted on) 35'
MF	22	Cesar Abel Roux		(substituted on) 45'
Manager:
(Uruguay) Héctor Núñez

GK	12	Paulo Vitor
DF	2	Eurico
DF	3	Luís Pereira
DF	14	Jayme de Almeida
DF	6	Wladimir
MF	8	Batista (c)
MF	5	Rocha	Yellow card	(substituted off) 69'
MF	22	Zenon
MF	5	Mário Sérgio	Yellow card	(substituted off) 69'
MF	7	Cafuringa
FW	9	Cláudio Adão
Substitutions:
GK	1	Ado
DF	4	Amaral
FW	20	Nunes
FW	16	Chico Spina
FW	10	Rivellino		(substituted on) 69'
FW	13	Lola		(substituted on) 69'
FW	11	Edu
Manager:
(Brazil) Luciano do Valle

== Goal scorers ==
7 goals

- (Brazil) Cláudio Adão

== Champion ==
World Cup of Masters Champions:

Brazil
First title
