= I World Cup of Masters =

1991 World Cup of Masters
Pelé Cup '91

Tournament details
- Host country: United States
- City: Miami
- Dates: 18 – 27 January (10 days)
- Teams: 6 (from 2 confederations)
- Venue: Joe Robbie Stadium

Final positions
- Champions: Brazil (3rd title)
- Runners-up: Argentina
- Third place: Italy
- Fourth place: Uruguay

Tournament statistics
- Matches played: 10
- Goals scored: 29 (2.9 per match)
- Top scorer(s): (Brazil) Zico (Argentina) Enzo Bulleri (3 goals each)
- Best player: (Brazil) Zico
- Best goalkeeper: (Argentina) Hugo Gatti

The I World Cup of Masters (also known as III Copa Pelé) was the fourth edition of the World Cup of Masters ran from 18 to 27 January 1991 and for the first time, it was held outside Brazil. It was held in Miami, and all of the matches were played at the Joe Robbie Stadium. The six "Master" teams were reigning champions Brazil, Italy, Uruguay, Argentina and for the first time representatives from England and Germany. The tournament involved the teams divided into two groups of three. Brazil won their third title, beating Argentina 2–1 in the final in a dramatic last-minute victory led by Zico and attended by 13,550 fans.

As part of the push to help make the U.S. soccer literate in time for the 1994 World Cup, the 1991 Pele Cup, which featured the six nations that have won a World Cup, was played at Joe Robbie Stadium. Five double-headers were scheduled between January 18–27, and featured Brazil, Germany, Italy, Argentina, Uruguay and England in a two-group, round-robin competition.

That was the first time this type of tournament has been performed in United States. Though, the Miami area historically did not prove to be a very enthusiastic audience for that kind of show, the organizers' aspect was to compete with the biggest sports event in the United States.

== Key players ==
The tournament featured the six nations that had won World Cup championships. The year each nation won the title is in parentheses.

Argentina (1978, 1986)

Forward Mario Kempes, 36, scored two goals in a 3–1 win over The Netherlands in 1978 Cup final. Fullback Alberto Tarantini, 35, was the heart of the defense in 1978 and 1982 World Cups.

Brazil (1958, 1962, 1970)

Forward Roberto Dinamite started in the 1978 FIFA World Cup and was considered one of the most popular players in Brazil. He retired recently from Vasco da Gama. Zico who travelled to Miami injured was one of the leading scorers in Brazil's football history.

Pelé, who had recently turned 50, did not play in the tournament due to a movie commitment. The United States bombing of Iraq kept Brazil`s Paulo Isidoro home. Isidoro got off a plane back to Brazil for fear of war-related violence in Miami.

England (1966)

Defender Bobby Moore, 49, captained the 1966 team that beat West Germany 4-2 after extra-time in the final. Moore has 108 international caps. Ray Clemence, 42, appeared 61 times on the national team.

Germany (1954, 1974, 1990)

Karl-Heinz Rummenigge scored five goals in the 1982 FIFA World Cup, leading West Germany to second place. Fullback Paul Breitner was a mainstay on the 1974 FIFA World Cup.

Italy (1934, 1938, 1982)

Paolo Rossi, 34, scored six goals in the 1982 FIFA World Cup, including one in the 3-1 win over West Germany. Forward Alessandro Altobelli, 37, scored once in 1982 final, and led Italy with four goals in 1986.

Uruguay (1930, 1950)

Alberto Cardaccio, 42, starred for the national team from 1970 to 1974, making 25 appearances. Fernando Morena appeared 21 times from 1974 to 1978 and starred for the Peñarol in Uruguay`s top league.

== Squads ==
For the list of the squads, see 1991 Copa Pelé squads.

== Group stage ==
Organizers called the tournament as "the most prestigious soccer championship ever held in the United States". The six-team field is separated into groups of three. A round-robin series determined the top two teams in each group to advance to the semifinals. That was the third Pele Cup, the first to be held outside of Brazil.

Pelé gave the opening kickoff between England and Uruguay in a Group B game on 18 January 1991. Italy played Germany in a Group A game on the same day.

Brazil won Group A with three points, Italy was second with two. Germany was eliminated with one point. Argentina, England and Uruguay tied with two points in Group B, but Argentina and Uruguay advanced because of goal difference.

In the beginning Brazil and Argentina, the most popular teams in the six-team Pele Cup, faced elimination, possibly leaving Julio Mazzei and tournament officials with a mostly European final four in a large Hispanic market. But eventually Brazil beat Italy 2–1 before 5,534 fans, in their last group game. Brazil, the most entertaining team in the tournament, fell behind 1–0 when Italy`s Roberto Pruzzo scored at 46'. Brazilian goalie Paulo Sergio deflected Pruzzo`s low, hard shot from 22 yards, then stretched desperately as the ball rolled away from his grasp into the net.

But Dinamite tied it 1–1 at 52' with a searing left-footed drive that left Italian goalie Renato Copparoni helpless. Dinamite snuck around Italian defender Claudio Gentile, chest-trapped an entry pass from Mario Sergio and in one motion released a shot from 8 yards. Zico the post-Pele legend who hadn't played in 20 days because of a pulled thigh muscle made his first tournament appearance in the 61st minute. The post-Pele legend who hadn't played in 20 days because of a pulled thigh muscle made his first tournament appearance in the 61st minute and made an immediate impact, as he gave Brazil a 2–1 lead when he scored on a rebound of his own shot.

Argentina needed a two-goal victory over England to advance to semifinals. The Argentines had three goals by halftime and went on to a 5–2 win as Mario Kempes scored twice. Former Fort Lauderdale striker Pedro Magallanes assisted on the fourth Argentine goal.

== Knock-out stage ==
A crowd of 5,620 in the first semifinal saw the Brazilians play the inventive, attacking soccer made famous by the 1958, 1962 and 1970 World Cup champions, led by Pele. Brazil beat Uruguay in the semifinals with a 4–0 win at Joe Robbie Stadium. Brazil would on to defend their Pele Cup against Argentina, a 2–1 winner on penalty kicks over Italy in the other semifinal.

Forwards Edu, Serginho and Roberto Dimamite broke down the Uruguay defense with brilliant passing combinations and deceptive footwork. Serginho made it 1–0 at 12' with a hard drive from 18 yards after taking a pass from Edu, who drew in two defenders with a tricky move. Dinamite played a give-and-go with Wladimir, who made Uruguay goalie Lorenzo Carrabs commit to a fake shot. Wladimir, a fullback, went around the fallen goalie and scored at 30' for a 2–0 Brazil lead. The third goal came on an open field run. Edu stole a pass in the Brazilian end, and fed Serginho, who led a 3-on-2 break into the box. Serginho passed up an open shot and touched a short pass to an onrushing Dinamite, who beat a defenseless Carrabs to make it 3–0 at 41'.

Italy and Argentina played in a 1990 World Cup semifinal, which Argentina won 2–1 on penalty kicks. Thursday night the masters combined for five yellow cards in a spiteful game filled with harsh tackles. Italy thrilled fans with what may be the most spectacular goal of the tournament. The Italians strung together a series of about 12 passes that maneuvered the Argentines out of position. The possession was capped when Franco Causio passed to Simone Boldini whose cross was headed in by Allesandro Altobelli at 12'. Altobelli outleaped two players for the header. Argentina tied it 1–1 at 47' when Enzo Bulleri`s shot from 28 yards curved around diving Italian goaltender Ivano Bordon into the corner of the net. Argentina beat Italy 5–4 in penalty kicks, the clincher coming from Oscar Mas. Argentina keeper Hugo Gatti stopped Italy`s Silvano Fontolan on the third kick to provide the one-goal margin.

== Final ==
Argentina, the 1987 Pele Cup champion, had 12 shots and forced Brazilian goalkeeper Paulo Sergio to make three diving stops. Enzo Bulleri gave Argentina a 1–0 lead at 25' when he drove a curving free kick from a sharp angle around a wall of defenders and past a diving Sergio. It was Bulleri`s third tournament goal, all coming on shots outside the penalty area. After Bulleri`s goal, Brazil started to get the better of the play. Serginho and Roberto Dinamite force Gatti to make diving saved, and Zenon hit the crossbar on a free kick.

At 44' Edu scored his second tournament goal to tie it for Brazil. Edu`s shot from 30 yards skipped past Gatti and skimmed the post. Argentina`s Carlos Squeo hit the post early in the second half, and Hussef Ali`s shot on the rebound was kick-saved by Paulo Sergio. Zico has been hampered by a pulled leg muscle and played only 73 minutes in two of Brazil`s three tournament games. He entered in the second half against Italy and Uruguay and scored a goal in each game. Brazilian coach Luciano do Valle planned to play Zico in the second half against Argentina, but a leg injury to midfielder Mario Sergio in the 13th minute forced Zico to play 77 minutes. Zico and Serginho twice connected on give-and-go passes in the box, but Zico could not finish. Gatti came off his line for a diving stop in the 74th minute, and Zico shot high from 15 yards four minutes later.

Zico scored the game-winner as the public address announcer was telling the crowd that penalty kicks would decide the championship if the score remained tied. Gatti came out on a crossing pass into the penalty area by Brazil`s Cafuringa, but as Gatti reached for the ball, defender Orlando Ruiz headed the pass away. Zico made a leaping kick and looped it over Gatti into the net.

That goal gave Brazil a 2–1 win before 13,544 fans at Joe Robbie Stadium. Zico`s goal capped a fast-paced, end-to-end offensive game that featured 32 shots and brilliant play by Argentina goalie Orlando Gatti. Gatti made five diving saves and 12 overall, and was named outstanding goalkeeper for the nine-day tournament.

Italy beat Uruguay 2–1 in the third-place game as Allesandro Altobelli assisted on goals by Paolo Rossi and Claudio Gentile.

== Group A ==
Results

January 18, 1991
20:45 PDT

Italy	1–0	Germany
Roberto Pruzzo 46'

Joe Robbie Stadium

January 20, 1991
15:00 PDT

Germany	1–1	Brazil
Cullmann		Janis Edu

Joe Robbie Stadium

January 22, 1991
18:30 PDT

Brazil	2–1	Italy
Roberto Dinamite 52'; Zico 78'		Pruzzo

Joe Robbie Stadium
Attendance: 5,534

Team	Pld	W	D	L	GF	GA	GD	Pts
Brazil	2	1	1	0	3	2	+1	3
Italy	2	1	0	1	2	2	0	2
Germany	2	0	1	1	1	2	-1	1

== Group B ==
Results

January 18, 1991
20:45 PDT

England	2–1	Uruguay
Worthington; Hill		Revetria

Joe Robbie Stadium

January 20, 1991
17:15 PDT

Uruguay	1–0	Argentina
Vicente Rodriguez 73'

Joe Robbie Stadium

January 22, 1991
18:30 PDT

Argentina	5–2	England
Kempes; Bulleri; Colombatti; Villa		Ainscow; Lyons

Joe Robbie Stadium

Team	Pld	W	D	L	GF	GA	GD	Pts
Argentina	2	1	0	1	5	3	+2	2
Uruguay	2	1	0	1	2	2	0	2
England	2	1	0	1	4	6	-2	2

== Semi-finals ==
January 24, 1991
18:30 PDT

Brazil	4–0	Uruguay
Serginho 12'; Wladimir 30'; Roberto Dinamite 41'; Zico (p')

Joe Robbie Stadium
Attendance: 5,620

January 24, 1991
20:45 PDT

Argentina	1–1	Italy
Enzo Bulleri 47'		Altobelli 12'
Penalties
	5–4

Joe Robbie Stadium

== Third Place Play Off ==
January 27, 1991
11:00 PDT

Italy	2–1	Uruguay
Gentile 44'; Rossi 86'		Pablo Forlán 89'

Joe Robbie Stadium

== Final ==
27 January 1991
13:15 UTC−6

Brazil	2-1	Argentina
Edu 44'; Zico 87'		Enzo Bulleri 25'

Joe Robbie Stadium, Miami
Attendance: 13,544
Referee: Walter Schneiller (West Germany)

Brazil	Argentina

GK	1	Paulo Sérgio
DF	3	Luís Pereira
DF	2	Amaral
DF	6	Zenon
DF	4	Wladimir
FW	17	Serginho Chulapa	(substituted off) 78'
MF	14	Edu	(substituted off) 68'
MF	13	Jayme de Almeida
MF	9	Mário Sergio	(substituted off) 13'
MF	8	Batista (c)
FW	11	Roberto Dinamite	(substituted off) 64'
Substitutes:
GK	12	Neneca
FW	10	Zico	(substituted on) 13'
FW	19	Nilson Dias
MF	15	Rivellino
FW	21	Eduardo	(substituted on) 64'
MF	7	Cafuringa	(substituted on) 78'
FW	22	César	(substituted on) 68'
Manager:
Luciano do Valle

GK	1	Hugo Orlando Gatti
DF	3	Pablo Agustin Comelles
DF	20	Orlando Luis Ruiz
DF	15	Roberto Jaime Zywica
MF	5	Víctor Alfredo Bottaniz
MF	13	Carlos Vicente Squeo
MF	20	Enzo Daniel Bulleri
MF	11	Ricardo Julio Villa	(substituted off) 59'
MF	8	Miguel Angel Colombatti	(substituted off) 17'
FW	10	Pedro Remigio Magallanes
FW	16	Mario Alberto Kempes	(substituted off) 74'
Substitutes:
FW	7	Fernando Husef Alí	(substituted on) 17'
DF	17	Jorge Paolino	(substituted on) 59'
FW	19	Oscar Antonio Más	(substituted on) 74'
Manager:
(Argentina) Carmelo Faraone

== Goal scorers ==
3 goals

- (Brazil) Zico
- (Argentina) Enzo Bulleri

2 goals

- (Brazil) Edu
- (Italy) Roberto Pruzzo
- (Argentina) Mario Kempes
- (Brazil) Dinamite

== Champion ==
World Cup of Masters Champions:

Brazil
Third title
