= Copa do Craque de Masters =

1990 World Cup of Masters
Zico Cup '90

Tournament details
- Host country: Brazil
- City: São Paulo
- Dates: 10 - 24 January (15 days)
- Teams: 5 (from 2 confederations)
- Venue(s): Estádio do Canindé; Pacaembu Stadium

Final positions
- Champions: Brazil (2nd title)
- Runners-up: Netherlands
- Third place: Argentina
- Fourth place: Italy

Tournament statistics
- Matches played: 11
- Goals scored: 46 (4.18 per match)
- Top scorer(s): (Poland) Ćmikiewicz & (Netherlands) Johnny Rep (4 goals)
- Best player: (Brazil) Zico

The Copa do Craque de Masters (also known as Copa Zico), was the third edition of the World Cup of Masters. For the third time running it was held in Brazil, over the course of January 1990. Returning to the format of the first tournament, there were five "Senior" teams, now addressed as "Masters".

The teams were hosts and reigning champions Brazil, Argentina, Italy and for the first time Netherlands and Poland. Brazil beat easily Holland in the final by the wide margin of 5-0, lifted the trophy and won the $20,000 award.

== Results ==
January 10, 1990
19:00 UTC−6

Argentina	5–2	Poland
Daniel Brailovsky; Fernando Ali; Norberto Outes 52'; Kazimierz Kmiecik o.g. Brindisi pen		Grzegorz Lato; Lesław Ćmikiewicz

Estadio do Caninde

January 10, 1990
21:30 UTC−6

Brazil	4–1	Netherlands
Éder; Cláudio Adão; Willy van de Kerkhof 84' o.g. Cláudio Adão 88'		Boeve

Estadio do Caninde

January 13, 1990
17:00 UTC−6

Italy	1–2	Netherlands
Giancarlo Antognoni 80' pen		Hovenkamp 35'; Johnny Rep 50'

Estadio do Caninde

January 14, 1990
18:00 UTC−6

Brazil	0–0	Argentina

Pacaembu Stadium

January 15, 1990
21:30 UTC−6

Italy	1–1	Poland
Causio 49'		Puszkarz 23'

Estadio do Caninde

January 17, 1990
19:00 UTC−6

Argentina	1–3	Netherlands
Brindisi		Johnny Rep; Johnny Rep; René van de Kerkhof

Estadio do Caninde

January 17, 1990
21:30 UTC−6

Brazil	2–1	Poland
Zico 16'; Wladimir 75'		Ćmikiewicz 7'

Estadio do Caninde, São Paulo

January 19, 1990
21:30 UTC−6

Italy	1–0	Argentina
Pruzzo 13'

Estadio do Caninde, São Paulo

January 10, 1990
16:00 UTC−6

Netherlands	2–4	Poland
Johnny Rep 29'; René van de Kerkhof 40'		Dabrowsky 4'; Ćmikiewicz 15' pen Grzegorz Lato; Ćmikiewicz

Pacaembu Stadium, São Paulo

January 10, 1990
18:00 UTC−6

Brazil	2–1	Italy
Cláudio Adão; Serginho		Causio

Pacaembu Stadium, São Paulo

== Group table ==
Team	Pld	W	D	L	GF	GA	GD	Pts
Brazil	4	3	1	0	8	3	+5	7
Netherlands	4	2	0	2	8	10	-2	4
Argentina	4	1	1	2	6	6	0	3
Italy	4	1	1	2	4	5	-1	3
Poland	4	1	1	2	8	10	-2	3

== Third-place play-off ==
January 24, 1990
19:00 UTC−6

Italy	2–3	Argentina

Pacaembu Stadium, São Paulo

== Final ==
24 January 1990
21:30 UTC−6

Brazil	5-0	Netherlands
Zico 2'; Serginho 51'; Éder 60'; Zico 64'; Cafuringa 85'	Report

Pacaembu Stadium, São Paulo
Attendance: 40,000
Referee: Alberto Michelotti (Italy)

Brazil	Netherlands

GK	1	Paulo Vítor	(substituted off) 46'
DF	22	Nelinho
DF	3	Luís Pereira
DF	23	Juninho	(substituted off) 46'
DF	16	Wladimir
MF	17	Batista
MF	5	Zenon
MF	8	Zico	Substituted off
FW	9	Cláudio Adão	Substituted off
MF	10	Rivellino
FW	21	Éder	(substituted off) 75'
Substitutes:
GK	12	Paulo Sérgio	(substituted on) 46'
DF	14	Jayme	(substituted on) 46'
FW	20	Serginho	Substituted on
FW	11	Edu	(substituted on) 75'
MF	7	Cafuringa	Substituted on
MF	15	Mário Sérgio	Substituted on
Manager:
(Brazil) Luciano do Valle

GK	1	Pim Doesburg
DF	2	John Oude Wesselink
DF	3	Hugo Hovenkamp
DF	4	Wim Rijsbergen
DF	11	Peter Boeve
MF	6	Jan Peters
MF	12	Jan van Deinsen	Substituted off
MF	8	Willy van de Kerkhof
MF	5	René van de Kerkhof
FW	10	Tschen La Ling	Substituted off
FW	9	Johnny Rep
Substitutes:
DF	14	Henk Warnas	Substituted on
Manager:
(Netherlands) Joop Stoffelen

== Goal scorers ==
4 goals

- (Poland) Lesław Ćmikiewicz
- (Netherlands) Johnny Rep

3 goals

- (Brazil) Cláudio Adão
- (Brazil) Zico

2 goals

- (Poland) Grzegorz Lato
- (Argentina) Miguel Ángel Brindisi
- (Netherlands) René van de Kerkhof
- (Brazil) Serginho Chulapa
- (Brazil) Éder
- (Italy) Franco Causio

1 goal

- (Argentina) Fernando Alí
- (Argentina) Daniel Brailovsky
- (Argentina) Norberto Outes
- (Brazil) Cafuringa
- (Brazil) Wladimir
- (Netherlands) Hugo Hovenkamp
- (Netherlands) Peter Boeve
- (Poland) Dabrowski
- (Poland) Zdzisław Puszkarz
- (Italy) Giancarlo Antognoni
- (Italy) Roberto Pruzzo

Own goal

- (Netherlands) Willy van de Kerkhof
- (Poland) Kazimierz Kmiecik

== Champion ==
World Cup of Masters Champions:

Brazil
Second title
