= 1987 Copa Pelé squads =

These are the squads for the national teams participated in the I Mundialito de Seniors held in Brazil, in 1987. The tournament was played in a round robin format with Argentina being the winners of this first edition.

== Group ==
=== West Germany ===
Head coach:

| No. | Pos. | Player | Date of birth (age) | Caps | Club |
|---|---|---|---|---|---|
| 1 | GK | Wolfgang Kleff | 16 November 1946 (aged 40) | 6 | (West Germany) FSV Salmrohr |
| 2 | DF | Dieter Zembski | 6 November 1946 (aged 40) | 1 | (West Germany) Retired |
| 3 | DF | Helmut Kremers | 24 March 1949 (aged 37) | 8 | (West Germany) Retired |
| 17 | FW | Dieter Herzog | 15 July 1946 (aged 40) | 5 | (West Germany) Retired |
| 5 | DF | Rolf Rüssmann | 13 October 1950 (aged 36) | 20 | (West Germany) Retired |
| 6 | MF | Wolfgang Weber | 26 June 1944 (aged 42) | 53 | (West Germany) Retired |
| 21 | DF | Paul Breitner | 5 September 1951 (aged 35) | 48 | (West Germany) Retired |
| 8 | MF | Bernhard Cullmann | 1 November 1949 (aged 37) | 40 | (West Germany) Retired |
| 9 | FW | Klaus Fischer | 27 December 1949 (aged 37) | 45 | (West Germany) VfL Bochum |
| 7 | MF | Bernd Gersdorff | 11 November 1946 (aged 40) | 1 | (West Germany) Retired |
| 11 | FW | Sigfried Held | 7 August 1942 (aged 44) | 41 | (West Germany) Retired |
| 13 | FW | Gerd Müller | 3 November 1945 (aged 41) | 62 | (West Germany) Retired |
| 20 | DF | Berti Vogts | 30 December 1946 (aged 40) | 96 | (West Germany) Retired |
| 15 | FW | Lothar Emmerich | 29 November 1941 (aged 45) | 5 | (West Germany) Retired |
| 16 | FW | Uwe Seeler | 5 November 1936 (aged 50) | 72 | (West Germany) Retired |
| 23 | FW | Bernd Hölzenbein | 9 March 1946 (aged 40) | 40 | (West Germany) Retired |
| 18 | MF | Wolfgang Overath (c) | 29 September 1943 (aged 43) | 81 | (West Germany) Retired |
| 10 | MF | Reinhold Wosab | 25 February 1948 (aged 38) | - | (West Germany) Retired |
| 14 | FW | Horst Köppel | 17 March 1948 (aged 38) | 11 | (West Germany) Retired |
| 19 | FW | Reiner Geye | 22 November 1949 (aged 37) | 4 | (West Germany) Retired |
| 4 | DF | Erwin Kremers | 24 March 1949 (aged 37) | 15 | (West Germany) Retired |

Players who were called up but did travel to said tournament:*(N°12)Sepp Maier 28/02/1944 GK (Germany) *(N°22)Manfred Manglitz 08/03/1940 GK (Germany)

=== Brazil ===
Head coach: Luciano do Valle

| No. | Pos. | Player | Date of birth (age) | Caps | Club |
|---|---|---|---|---|---|
| 1 | GK | Ado | 4 July 1946 (aged 40) | 3 | (Brazil) Retired |
| 2 | MF | Djalma Dias | 21 August 1939 (aged 47) | 21 | (Brazil) Retired |
| 3 | DF | Marco Antônio | 6 February 1951 (aged 35) | 39 | (Brazil) Retired |
| 4 | DF | Toninho | 7 June 1948 (aged 38) | 17 | (Brazil) Retired |
| 7 | MF | Cafuringa | 10 November 1948 (aged 38) | - | (Brazil) Retired |
| 8 | MF | Rivellino (c) | 1 January 1946 (aged 41) | 92 | (Brazil) Retired |
| 9 | FW | Jairzinho | 25 December 1944 (aged 42) | 105 | (Brazil) Retired |
| 10 | FW | Pelé | 23 October 1940 (aged 46) | 91 | (Brazil) Retired |
| 11 | FW | Edu | 6 August 1949 (aged 37) | 42 | (Brazil) Retired |
| 12 | GK | Renato | 5 December 1944 (aged 42) | 2 | (Brazil) Retired |
| 13 | MF | Lola | 2 January 1950 (aged 37) | - | (Brazil) Retired |
| 14 | MF | Teodoro | 22 October 1946 (aged 40) | - | (Brazil) Retired |
| 6 | DF | Alfredo | 18 October 1946 (aged 40) | 2 | (Brazil) Retired |
| 5 | MF | Gérson | 11 January 1941 (aged 45) | 70 | (Brazil) Retired |
| 15 | MF | Dicá | 13 July 1947 (aged 39) | 7 | (Brazil) Retired |
| 20 | FW | Dadá Maravilha | 4 March 1946 (aged 40) | 7 | (Brazil) Retired |
| 17 | MF | Carpegiani | 7 February 1949 (aged 37) | 30 | (Brazil) Retired |
| 16 | DF | Luís Pereira | 21 June 1949 (aged 37) | 32 | (Brazil) Corinthians |
| 19 | DF | Eurico | 3 April 1948 (aged 38) | 2 | (Brazil) Retired |
| 18 | MF | Chicão | 30 January 1949 (aged 37) | 9 | (Brazil) Retired |
| 22 | FW | Gil | 24 December 1950 (aged 36) | 29 | (Brazil) Retired |

Players and were called up but did travel to said tournament:*(N°21)Valdomiro Vaz Franco FW 17/02/1946 (Brazil)

- (N°23)Raul Guillherme Plassmann GK 27/09/1944 (Brazil) He was left without playing the tournament:**(N°20)Romeu Evangelista FW 27/03/1950 (Brazil)

=== Italy ===
Head coach: Cesare Rovatti

| No. | Pos. | Player | Date of birth (age) | Caps | Club |
|---|---|---|---|---|---|
| 1 | GK | Enrico Albertosi | 2 November 1939 (aged 47) | 34 | (Italy) Retired |
| 4 | DF | Aldo Maldera | 14 October 1953 (aged 33) | 10 | (Italy) Fiorentina |
| 3 | DF | Oscar Damiani | 15 June 1950 (aged 36) | 2 | (Italy) Retired |
| 2 | DF | Antonello Cuccureddu | 6 October 1949 (aged 37) | 13 | (Italy) Retired |
| 5 | DF | Giacinto Facchetti (c) | 18 July 1942 (aged 44) | 94 | (Italy) Retired |
| 6 | MF | Claudio Sala | 8 September 1947 (aged 39) | 18 | (Italy) Retired |
| 10 | FW | Roberto Boninsegna | 13 November 1943 (aged 43) | 22 | (Italy) Retired |
| 11 | FW | Angelo Marchi | 28 February 1950 (aged 36) | - | (Italy) Retired |
| 12 | GK | Dino Zoff | 28 February 1942 (aged 44) | 112 | (Italy) Retired |
| 13 | DF | Maurizio Turone | 27 October 1948 (aged 38) | - | (Italy) Retired |
| 14 | MF | Gianni Rivera | 18 August 1943 (aged 43) | 60 | (Italy) Retired |
| 15 | DF | Nevio Scala | 22 November 1947 (aged 39) | - | (Italy) Retired |
| 9 | FW | José Altafini | 24 July 1938 (aged 48) | 6 | (Italy) Retired |
| 18 | DF | Francesco Morini | 12 August 1944 (aged 42) | 11 | (Italy) Retired |
| 16 | DF | Fabrizio Poletti | 13 July 1943 (aged 43) | 6 | (Italy) Retired |

Players who were called up but did not travel to said tournament:*(N°7)FW *(N°8)MF *(N°17)MF

- (N°19)Giuseppe Savoldi FW 21/01/1947 (Italy) *(N°20)DF *(N°21)FW *(N°22)GK *(N°23)MF

=== Argentina ===
Head coach: (Argentina) Carmelo Faraone.

| No. | Pos. | Player | Date of birth (age) | Caps | Club |
|---|---|---|---|---|---|
| 2 | DF | Rafael Albrecht | 23 August 1941 (aged 45) | 39 | (Argentina) Retired |
| 5 | MF | Osvaldo Ardiles | 3 August 1952 (aged 34) | 63 | (England) Tottenham |
| 18 | MF | Carlos Babington | 20 September 1949 (aged 37) | 13 | (Argentina) Retired |
| 7 | MF | Miguel Ángel Brindisi | 8 October 1950 (aged 36) | 46 | (Argentina) Retired |
| 1 | GK | Carlos Buttice | 17 December 1942 (aged 44) | 3 | (Argentina) Retired |
| 4 | DF | Osvaldo Roberto Cortés | 6 June 1950 (aged 36) | 1 | (Argentina) Retired |
| 9 | FW | Darío Felman | 25 October 1951 (aged 35) | 1 | (Argentina) Retired |
| 19 | FW | Pedro Alexis González | 10 March 1946 (aged 40) | 19 | (Argentina) Retired |
| 10 | FW | Mario Kempes | 15 July 1954 (aged 32) | 43 | (Austria) First Vienna |
| 16 | FW | Oscar Más | 28 October 1946 (aged 40) | 37 | (Argentina) Talleres (RE) |
| 3 | DF | Roberto Mouzo | 8 January 1953 (aged 33) | 4 | (Argentina) Retired |
| 15 | DF | Jorge Olguín | 17 May 1952 (aged 34) | 60 | (Argentina) Retired |
| 6 | DF | Juan Domingo Rocchia | 13 June 1951 (aged 35) | 1 | (Argentina) Retired |
| 8 | MF | Carlos Squeo | 4 June 1948 (aged 38) | 9 | (Argentina) Alumni (VM) |

Players who were called up but did travel to said Tournament:*(N°11)Jose Orlando Berta MF 19/04/1952 (Argentina),*(N°12)Carlos Alberto Rodriguez GK 12/03/1952 (Argentina),*(N°13)Roberto Jaime Zywica MF 21/01/1947 (Argentina),*(N°14)Carlos Veglio FW 27/08/1946 (Argentina),*(N°17)Norberto Outes FW 10/10/1953 (Argentina).

Additional players who were with the squad:**(N°21)Omar Larrosa MF 18/11/1947 (Argentina) **(N°20)Oscar Ortiz FW 08/04/1953 (Argentina).

=== Uruguay ===
Head coach: Angel Castelnoble.

| No. | Pos. | Player | Date of birth (age) | Caps | Club |
|---|---|---|---|---|---|
| 4 | DF | Pablo Forlán | 14 July 1945 (aged 41) | 17 | (Uruguay) Retired |
| 10 | MF | Pedro Rocha | 3 December 1942 (aged 44) | 52 | (Uruguay) Retired |
| 9 | FW | Fernando Morena | 2 February 1952 (aged 34) | 53 | (Uruguay) Retired |

Players who were called up but did not travel to said tournament:*(N°1)GK *(N°2)DF *(N°3)DF *(N°5)MF *(N°6)DF *(N°7)FW *(N°8)MF *(N°11)FW *(N°12)GK *(N°13)DF *(N°14)MF *(N°15)FW *(N°16)MF *(N°17)DF *(N°18)FW *(N°19)DF *(N°20)GK *(N°21)FW *(N°22)DF *(N°23)MF
