= 1993 Copa Pelé squads =

These are the squads for the national teams participated in the II World Cup of Masters held in Austria, in the summer of 1993. The tournament was played in two groups, culminating with the final between Austria and Italy.

== Group A ==
=== Italy ===
Head coach:

No.	Pos.	Player	Date of birth (age)	Caps	Club
1	GK	Ottorino Piotti	31 July 1954 (aged 38)	-	(Italy) Retired
4	DF	Antonio Cabrini	8 October 1957 (aged 35)	73	(Italy) Retired
3	DF	Luciano Favero	11 October 1957 (aged 35)	-	(Italy) Retired
2	DF	Silvano Fontolan	24 February 1955 (aged 38)	-	(Italy) Retired
6	DF	Claudio Gentile	27 September 1953 (aged 39)	71	(Italy) Retired
5	MF	Franco Cerilli	26 October 1953 (aged 39)	-	(Italy) Retired
8	MF	Roberto Filippi	30 July 1948 (aged 44)	-	(Italy) Retired
10	MF	Giuseppe Dossena	2 May 1958 (aged 35)	38	(Italy) Retired
15	FW	Franco Causio	1 February 1949 (aged 44)	63	(Italy) Retired
16	FW	Bruno Conti	13 March 1955 (aged 38)	47	(Italy) Retired
18	FW	Alessandro Altobelli	28 November 1955 (aged 37)	61	(Italy) Retired
19	FW	Francesco Graziani	16 December 1952 (aged 40)	64	(Italy) Retired
11	FW	Roberto Pruzzo	1 April 1955 (aged 38)	6	(Italy) Retired
20	FW	Paolo Rossi	23 September 1956 (aged 36)	48	(Italy) Retired

Players who were called up but did travel to said tournament:*(N°7)FW *(N°9)FW *(N°12)GK *(N°13)DF *(N°14)MF *(N°17)MF *(N°21)GK *(N°22)DF *(N°23)MF

=== Netherlands ===
Head coach:

No.	Pos.	Player	Date of birth (age)	Caps	Club
2	DF	Ruud Krol	24 March 1949 (aged 44)	83	(Netherlands) Retired
3	DF	Keje Molenaar	29 September 1958 (aged 34)	2	(Netherlands) Retired
5	MF	Arnold Mühren	2 June 1951 (aged 42)	23	(Netherlands) Retired
8	MF	Dick Schoenaker	30 November 1952 (aged 40)	13	(Netherlands) Retired
21	MF	René van de Kerkhof	16 September 1951 (aged 41)	47	(Netherlands) Retired
7	FW	Pier Tol	12 July 1958 (aged 34)	5	(Netherlands) Retired

Players who were called up but travel to said tournament:*(N°1)GK *(N°4)DF *(N°6)DF *(N°9)FW *(N°10)MF *(N°11)FW *(N°12)MF *(N°13)DF *(N°14)FW *(N°15)DF *(N°16)GK *(N°17)FW *(N°18)MF *(N°19)DF *(N°20)FW *(N°21)FW *(N°22)GK *(N°23)DF

=== Brazil ===
Head coach: Luciano do Valle

No.	Pos.	Player	Date of birth (age)	Caps	Club
1	GK	Paulo Sérgio	24 July 1953 (aged 39)	3	(Brazil) Retired
2	DF	Rosemiro Correia de Souza	22 February 1954 (aged 39)	26	(Brazil) Retired
3	DF	Luís Pereira	21 June 1949 (aged 44)	32	(Brazil) São Bernardo
5	DF	Amaral	25 December 1954 (aged 38)	40	(Brazil) Retired
6	DF	Wladimir	29 August 1954 (aged 38)	5	(Brazil) Retired
7	MF	Paulo Isidoro	3 August 1953 (aged 39)	36	(Brazil) Valeriodoce Esporte Clube
8	MF	Rivellino (c)	1 January 1946 (aged 47)	92	(Brazil) Retired
9	FW	Cláudio Adão	2 July 1955 (aged 38)	11	(Brazil) Ceará
12	GK	Hélio Miguel Neneca	18 December 1947 (aged 45)	-	(Brazil) Retired
11	FW	Edu	6 August 1949 (aged 43)	42	(Brazil) Retired
14	MF	Sócrates	19 February 1954 (aged 39)	60	(Brazil) Retired
15	DF	Juninho Fonseca	29 August 1958 (aged 34)	4	(Brazil) Nacional Atlético Clube (SP)
16	FW	Serginho Chulapa	23 December 1953 (aged 39)	20	(Brazil) São Caetano
13	DF	Fernando Pires	7 February 1951 (aged 42)	-	(Brazil) Retired
18	FW	Edu Bala	25 October 1948 (aged 44)	6	(Brazil) Retired
19	DF	Zé Maria	8 May 1949 (aged 44)	46	(Brazil) Retired
21	MF	Gérson	11 January 1941 (aged 52)	70	(Brazil) Retired

Players who were up but did to tournament:*(N°4)MF *(N°10)MF *(N°17)DF *(N°20)FW *(N°21)DF *(N°22)GK *(N°23)MF

=== England ===
Head coach:

No.	Pos.	Player	Date of birth (age)	Caps	Club
7	FW	Luther Blissett	1 February 1958 (aged 35)	14	(England) Watford
9	FW	Frank Worthington	23 November 1948 (aged 44)	8	(England) Retired

Players who were called up but did travel to said tournament:*(N°1)GK *(N°2)DF *(N°3)DF *(N°4)MF *(N°5)DF *(N°6)DF *(N°8)MF *(N°10)MF *(N°11)FW *(N°12)DF *(N°13)GK *(N°14)MF *(N°15)DF *(N°16)MF *(N°17)FW *(N°18)MF *(N°19)FW *(N°20)DF *(N°21)MF *(N°22)GK *(N°23)DF

== Group B ==
=== Austria ===
Head coach: Franz Hasil

No.	Pos.	Player	Date of birth (age)	Caps	Club
1	GK	Klaus Lindenberger	28 May 1957 (aged 36)	43	(Austria) FC Linz
5	DF	Robert Sara (c)	9 June 1946 (aged 47)	55	(Austria) Retired
14	DF	Heinrich Strasser	28 October 1948 (aged 44)	26	(Austria) Retired
4	DF	Dieter Mirnegg	24 May 1954 (aged 39)	15	SV Austria Tabak Linz
20	MF	Josef Sara	9 March 1954 (aged 39)	-	(Austria) Retired
15	MF	Reinhold Hintermaier	14 February 1956 (aged 37)	15	(Germany) 1. FC Nürnberg
11	MF	Johann Dihanich	24 October 1958 (aged 34)	19	(Austria) Retired
3	MF	Herbert Prohaska	8 August 1955 (aged 37)	83	(Austria) Retired
8	FW	Hans Krankl	14 February 1953 (aged 40)	69	(Austria) Retired
10	FW	Wilhelm Kreuz	29 May 1949 (aged 44)	56	(Austria) Retired
9	FW	Kurt Welzl	6 November 1954 (aged 38)	22	(Austria) Retired
13	GK	Herbert Feurer	14 January 1954 (aged 39)	7	(Austria) Retired
2	MF	Ernst Baumeister	22 January 1957 (aged 36)	39	(Austria) Retired
12	DF	Bruno Pezzey	3 February 1955 (aged 38)	84	(Austria) Retired
7	FW	Walter Schachner	1 February 1957 (aged 36)	64	(Austria) Retired

Players who were called up but did travel to said tournament:*(N°6)DF *(N°16)FW

- (N°17)DF *(N°18)MF *(N°19)FW *(N°20)GK
- (N°21)DF *(N°22)MF *(N°23)FW

=== Germany ===
Head coach:

No.	Pos.	Player	Date of birth (age)	Caps	Club
1	GK	Harald Schumacher	6 March 1954 (aged 39)	76	(West Germany) Retired
2	DF	Hans-Peter Briegel	11 October 1955 (aged 37)	72	(West Germany) Retired
3	MF	Paul Breitner	5 September 1951 (aged 41)	48	(West Germany) Retired
4	DF	Karlheinz Förster	25 July 1958 (aged 34)	81	(West Germany) Retired
6	DF	Michael Kutzop	24 March 1955 (aged 38)	-	(West Germany) Retired
9	FW	Horst Hrubesch	17 April 1951 (aged 42)	21	(West Germany) Retired
11	FW	Karl-Heinz Rummenigge (c)	25 September 1955 (aged 37)	95	(West Germany) Retired
14	MF	Felix Magath	26 July 1953 (aged 39)	43	(West Germany) Retired
16	FW	Thomas Allofs	17 November 1959 (aged 33)	2	(West Germany) Retired
15	DF	Klaus Augenthaler	26 September 1957 (aged 35)	27	(West Germany) Retired
13	FW	Klaus Allofs	5 December 1956 (aged 36)	56	(West Germany) Werder Bremen
7	FW	Marcel Răducanu (ROM)	21 October 1954 (aged 38)	21	(Romania) Retired

Players who were called up but did travel to said tournament:*(N°8)MF *(N°10)MF *(N°12)GK *(N°17)MF *(N°18)FW *(N°19)DF *(N°20)MF *(N°21)GK

*(N°22)FW                                                                                       *(N°23)MF

=== Uruguay ===
Head coach:

No.	Pos.	Player	Date of birth (age)	Caps	Club
		Vladimir Naidenov	Missing required parameter 1=month! (aged 0)	n/a	(Uruguay) Retired
5	MF	Abraham Yeladian	2 January 1958 (aged 35)	4	(Uruguay) Retired

Players who were called up but did travel to said tournament:*(N°1)GK *(N°2)DF *(N°3)DF *(N°4)DF *(N°6)DF *(N°7)FW *(N°8)MF *(N°9)FW *(N°10)MF *(N°11)FW *(N°12)GK *(N°13)MF *(N°14)DF *(N°15)FW *(N°16)MF *(N°17)FW *(N°18)MF *(N°19)DF *(N°20)MF *(N°21)DF *(N°22)GK *(N°23)FW

=== Argentina ===
Head coach:

No.	Pos.	Player	Date of birth (age)	Caps	Club
8	DF	Luis Galván	24 February 1948 (aged 45)	34	(Argentina) Retired
5	MF	Daniel Brailovsky	18 November 1958 (aged 34)	18*	(Israel) Retired
22	MF	Ricardo Villa	18 August 1952 (aged 40)	17	(Argentina) Retired
11	FW	Mario Kempes	15 July 1954 (aged 38)	43	(Chile) Fernández Vial

Players who were called up but did travel to said tournament:*(N°1)GK *(N°2)DF *(N°3)DF *(N°4)DF *(N°6)DF *(N°7)FW *(N°9)FW *(N°10)MF *(N°12)GK *(N°13)DF *(N°14)FW *(N°15)DF *(N°16)MF *(N°17)FW *(N°18)MF

- (N°19)DF *(N°20)MF *(N°21)GK *(N°22)DF *(N°23)MF

== Sources ==
- Copa Pelé: la Copa del Mundo de veteranos de la que Uruguay fue constante animador
