= III World Cup of Masters squads =

Austrian football tournament

These are the squads for the national teams participated in the III World Cup of Masters held in Austria, in the summer of 1995. The tournament was played in two groups, culminating with Brazil winning the cup.

== Group A ==
=== Brazil ===
Head coach: Luciano do Valle

No.	Pos.	Player	Date of birth (age)	Caps	Club
4	DF	Rosemiro Correia de Souza	22 February 1954 (aged 41)	26	(Brazil) Retired
5	MF	Zenon de Souza Farias	31 March 1954 (aged 41)	5	(Brazil) Retired
6	DF	Amaral	25 December 1954 (aged 40)	40	(Brazil) Retired
13	DF	Luís Pereira	21 June 1949 (aged 46)	32	(Brazil) Retired
7	FW	Edu	6 August 1949 (aged 45)	42	(Brazil) Retired
15	DF	Wladimir	29 August 1954 (aged 40)	5	(Brazil) Retired
8	MF	Paulo Isidoro	3 August 1953 (aged 41)	36	(Brazil) Valeriodoce Esporte Clube
9	FW	Walter Casagrande	15 April 1963 (aged 32)	19	(Brazil) Corinthians

Players who were called up but did to said tournament:*(N°1)GK *(N°2)DF *(N°3)DF

- (N°10)MF *(N°11)FW
- (N°12)GK *(N°14)MF *(N°15)FW *(N°16)DF *(N°17)MF *(N°18)FW *(N°19)MF *(N°20)DF *(N°21)FW *(N°22)GK *(N°23)MF

== Group B ==
=== Argentina ===
Head coach:

No.	Pos.	Player	Date of birth (age)	Caps	Club
1	GK	Ubaldo Fillol	21 July 1950 (aged 44)	58	(Argentina) Retired
2	DF	Adrián Domenech	25 March 1959 (aged 36)	-	(Argentina) Retired
3	DF	Luis Galván	24 February 1948 (aged 47)	34	(Argentina) Retired
4	DF	Hector Bargas	10 May 1957 (aged 38)	-	(Argentina) Retired
5	DF	Julio Olarticoechea	18 October 1958 (aged 36)	32	(Argentina) Retired
6	MF	Héctor Enrique	26 April 1962 (aged 33)	11	(Japan) Tosu Futures
8	MF	Emilio Commisso	5 November 1956 (aged 38)	-	(Argentina) Retired
9	FW	Mario Kempes (c)	15 July 1954 (aged 40)	43	(Argentina) Retired
10	MF	Ricardo Enrique Bochini	25 January 1954 (aged 41)	28	(Argentina) Retired
11	FW	Gabriel Calderón	7 February 1960 (aged 35)	23	(Argentina) Retired

Players who were called up but did to said tournament:*(N°7)MF *(N°8)FW *(N°10)MF *(N°12)GK *(N°13)DF *(N°14)MF *(N°15)DF *(N°16)MF *(N°17)FW *(N°18)MF *(N°19)DF *(N°20)MF *(N°21)FW *(N°22)GK *(N°23)MF

=== France ===
Head coach:

No.	Pos.	Player	Date of birth (age)	Caps	Club
1	GK	Sylvain Sansone	18 October 1967 (aged 27)	-	(France) Sedan
2	DF	Gérard Janvion	21 August 1953 (aged 41)	40	(France) Retired
3	DF	Serge Jenner	24 January 1960 (aged 35)	-	(France) FCSR Haguenau
4	DF	Michel Bibard	30 November 1958 (aged 36)	6	(France) Retired
5	DF	Philippe Jeannol	6 August 1958 (aged 36)	1	(France) Retired
6	FW	Alain Couriol	24 October 1958 (aged 36)	12	(France) Retired
7	FW	Daniel Xuereb	22 June 1959 (aged 36)	8	(France) Retired
8	MF	Roger Jouve	11 March 1949 (aged 46)	7	(France) Retired
9	FW	Albert Gemmrich	13 February 1955 (aged 40)	5	(France) Retired
10	MF	Cyriaque Didaux	19 August 1960 (aged 34)	-	(France) FCSR Haguenau
11	MF	Didier Six	21 August 1954 (aged 40)	52	(France) Retired

Players who were called up but did travel to said tournament:*(N°12)MF *(N°13)DF *(N°14)FW *(N°15)MF *(N°16)GK *(N°17)FW

- (N°18)MF *(N°19)DF *(N°20)MF *(N°21)FW *(N°22)GK *(N°23)FW

== Sources ==
- Copa Pelé: la Copa del Mundo de veteranos de la que Uruguay fue constante animador
