= World Cup of Masters =

- Organiser(s): IMFA
- Founded: 1987
- Abolished: 1997; 29 years ago
- Region: International
- Teams: 8 (1995)
- Related competitions: Legends Cup
- Last champions: Brazil (1995)
- Most championships: Brazil (4 titles)
- Broadcaster: Bandeirantes

The World Cup of Masters, also known as the Pelé World Cup and Mundial de Seniors, was a Mini World Cup event that ran every two years from 1987 until 1995. The tournament was for senior (35+) players and it was under the rules of the IMFA (International Master Football Association), presided by Julio Mazzei at the time. In 1990 the term "seniors" was replaced by "masters". The editions until 1991 were organized by Brazilian TV station Bandeirantes, and the International Masters Football Association.

Most of the teams participated used to play masters games on a regular basis and kept the quality of football on a competitive level. Brazil Masters team, which won the 1989 event and finished second to Argentina in 1987.

There were two exceptions to FIFA rules: players must be 34-and-over, and teams were allowed five substitutions instead of two. Teams were awarded two points for a win, one point for a tie and no points for a loss in group play. Semifinal, third-place and championship matches would be decided by penalty kicks if tied at the end of regulation time.

== International Master Football Association ==
IMFA after consultation with FIFA's general secretary Sepp Blatter took initiative to organise the tournaments for legendary veteran players in an attempt to bring back a glimpse of the previous glorious World Cups. Julio Mazzei as a president of IMFA played a major part, while assisted by vice-president and England representative Sandra Roberts and German Werner Treimetten.

== World Cup Legends ==
Legends of the game participated in the tournaments reviving somehow the FIFA World Cups of the previous years. Pelé was a starter for Brazil in the opening game of the 1987 tournament, while Zico played a key role in Brazil's winning performance in 1990. Other players played in the World Cups of Masters were Mario Kempes, Klaus Allofs, Gerd Müller, Karl-Heinz Rummenigge and Horst Hrubesch .

As Rivellino in 1989 and 1990 after 1970 FIFA World Cup either three times, Paolo Rossi and Alessandro Altobelli were crowned World Champions for the second time in their career in 1993 after having already won the 1982 FIFA World Cup. This time it was not West Germany in the final but Austria who co-hosted the tournament with Italy. The latter presented some great players in the tournaments like Hans Krankl, Herbert Prohaska and Walter Schachner. Other big names of the world football fielded in the tournament were Paul Breitner, José Altafini, Bruno Conti, Harald Schumacher, Hans-Peter Briegel, Klaus Augenthaler, Jairzinho, Enrico Albertosi, Sócrates, Bobby Moore, Frank Worthington and René van de Kerkhof.

Luciano do Valle won 4 trophies with Brazil but Enzo Bearzot proved to be the only coach won a FIFA World Cup as well.

== Results ==
=== Finals ===
Keys

- aet: after extra time
- p: penalty shoot-out

Ed.	Years	Hosts	Champions	Score	Runners up	Venues	City	Num. teams
1	1987	Brazil	Argentina	1–0	Brazil	Pacaembu	São Paulo	5
2	1989	Brazil	Brazil	4–2	Uruguay	Canindé	São Paulo	6
3	1990	Brazil	Brazil	5–0	Netherlands	Pacaembu	São Paulo	5
4	1991	United States	Brazil	2–1	Argentina	Joe Robbie	Miami	6
5	1993	Austria Italy	Italy	2–0	Austria	Nereo Rocco	Trieste	8
6	1995	Austria	Brazil	1–1 (3–2 p)	Argentina	Wörthersee	Klagenfurt	8

=== Results by team ===
Most successful team was Brazil with 4 trophies, while Argentina won only 1 Cup and lost the 1995 one to Brazil in penalties. Italy's squad of 1982 repeated the 1982 in 1993 beating Austria by 2–0 in the final.

Teams	Winners	Runners-up
Brazil	4 (1989, 1990, 1991, 1995)	1 (1987)
Italy	1 (1993)	0
Argentina	1 (1987)	2 (1991, 1995)
Uruguay	0	1 (1989)
Netherlands	0	1 (1990)
Austria	0	1 (1993)

== Participating teams and results ==
Brazil and Argentina participated in the 6 tournaments facing each other in the final twice, in 1989 which was the inaugural year and in 1995, the very last year of the Masters tournaments. Italy also had 6 participations winning the trophy once in the 1993 edition.

Team	1987	1989	1990	1991	1993	1995	Total
Brazil	2nd	W	W	W	4th	W	6
Argentina	W	2nd	3rd	2nd	G	2nd	6
Austria	–	–	–	–	2nd	G	2
England	–	–	–	G	G	–	2
France	–	–	–	–	–	G	1
Germany	G	G	–	G	3rd	3rd	5
Great Britain	–	G	–	–	–	–	1
Italy	G	G	G	3rd	W	4th	6
Netherlands	–	–	2nd	–	G	G	3
Poland	–	–	G	–	–	–	1
Portugal	–	–	–	–	–	G	1
Uruguay	G	2nd	–	4th	G	–	4

W: winner.
G: eliminated in group stage.

== Top scorers ==
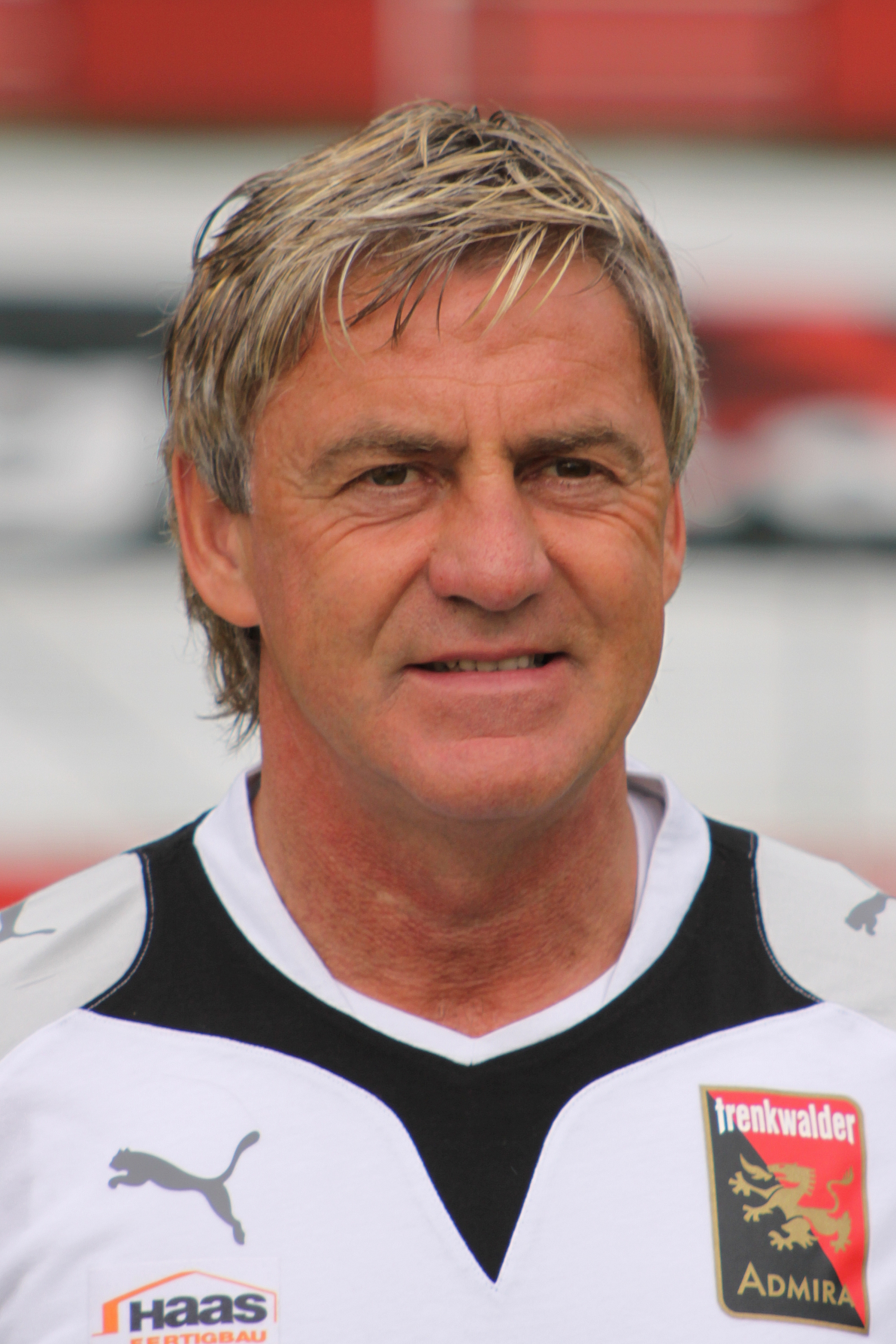
Walter Schachner (Austria) is the all-time leading scorer with 8 goals

Austrian Walter Schachner is the overall goalscorer with 8 goals, all scored in 1993. Brazilian Zico was the top scorer in 1990 and 1991 scoring a total of 6 goals in the Cups.

Mario Kempes and Paolo Rossi scored 2 goals each with Rivellino having a total of 3 goals. Legendary Pelé, at the age of 47, didn't manage to score though he played for 90 minutes in the opening 1987 match.

Edition	Golden Boot	Goals
1987	(Brazil) Rivellino	2
1989	(Brazil) Cláudio Adão	7
1990	(Netherlands) Johnny Rep	4
1990	(Poland) Lesław Ćmikiewicz	4
1991	(Brazil) Zico	3
1993	(Austria) Walter Schachner	8

== Players with most participations ==
Player	Nationality	Participations	Editions
Luís Pereira	Brazil	5	1989, 1990, 1991, 1993, 1995
Amaral	Brazil	5	1989, 1990, 1991, 1993, 1995
Rivellino	Brazil	5	1987, 1989, 1990, 1991, 1993
Wladimir	Brazil	5	1989, 1990, 1991, 1993, 1995
Francesco Graziani	Italy	4	1989, 1990, 1991, 1993
Mario Kempes	Argentina	4	1987, 1991, 1993, 1995
Edu	Brazil	4	1989, 1990, 1991, 1993
Zenon de Souza Farias	Brazil	4	1989, 1990, 1991, 1995
Cafuringa	Brazil	4	1987, 1989, 1990, 1991
Jayme de Almeida	Brazil	3	1989, 1990, 1991
Batista	Brazil	3	1989, 1990, 1991
Pablo Forlan	Uruguay	3	1987, 1989, 1991
Fernando Morena	Uruguay	3	1987, 1989, 1991
Oscar Mas	Argentina	3	1987, 1990, 1991
Francesco Morini	Italy	3	1987, 1989, 1990
Claudio Gentile	Italy	3	1990, 1991, 1993
Franco Causio	Italy	3	1990, 1991, 1993
Wolfgang Kleff	Germany	3	1987, 1989, 1991

== See also ==
- Legends Cup (Russia)
