= I Mundialito de Seniors =

1987 World Cup of Masters
Pele Cup '87

Tournament details
- Host country: Brazil
- Dates: 4–18 January (15 days)
- Teams: 5 (from 2 confederations)
- Venues: 3 (in 3 host cities)

Final positions
- Champions: Argentina (1st title)
- Runners-up: Brazil
- Third place: Uruguay
- Fourth place: West Germany

Tournament statistics
- Matches played: 11
- Goals scored: 27 (2.45 per match)
- Top scorer(s): (Argentina) Oscar Más (Brazil) Rivellino
- Best player: (Brazil) Rivellino

I Mundialito de Seniors (also known as I Copa Pelé) was the first World Cup of Masters. This was an unsanctioned tournament, and players were not recognised with international caps. It was held in January 1987 in Brazil. There were five countries that originally entered – Brazil, Argentina, Uruguay, West Germany and Italy.

The tournament pitted all teams against each other in a League, with the top two teams then playing each other in the final. Argentina won the event, beating Brazil 1-0 in the final in São Paulo. The final between Argentina and Brazil drew 50,000 fans reviving moments of glory for the bitter rivals.

== Venues ==
Three cities hosted the tournament:

São Paulo	Santos	Porto Alegre
Pacaembu Stadium	Vila Belmiro	Estádio Beira-Rio
23°32′55.1″S 46°39′54.4″W	23°57′4″S 46°20′20″W	30°3′56.21″S 51°14′9.91″W
Capacity: 60,000	Capacity: 32,000	Capacity: 80,000
	Vila Belmiro	Estádio Beira-Rio
I Mundialito de Seniors (Brazil)
Santos	São Paulo	Porto Alegre

== Squads ==
For the list of the squads, see 1987 Copa Pelé squads.

== Results ==
January 4, 1987

Brazil	3–0	Italy
Levi 38' (o.g.); Rivellino 69'; Dario 83'

Pacaembu, São Paulo
Attendance: 50,000

West Germany	1–1	Argentina

Via Belmiro, Santos

January 7, 1987

Brazil	0–0	Uruguay

Via Belmiro, Santos

January 9, 1987

West Germany	2–1	Italy
Breitner 7' (pen.); Geye 57'		Savoldi 89'

Via Belmiro, Santos

January 11, 1987

Uruguay	2–1	Italy

Via Belmiro, Santos

Brazil	1–3	Argentina
Jairzinho		González; Más

São Paulo

January 13, 1987

Argentina	1–2	Italy

Via Belmiro, Santos

January 14, 1987

Uruguay	2–0	West Germany

São Paulo

January 16, 1987

Argentina	4–0	Uruguay

Porto Alegre

Brazil	2–1	West Germany
Rivellino; Gil		Hölzenbein

Via Belmiro, Santos

== Group table ==
Team	Pld	W	D	L	GF	GA	GD	Pts
Argentina	4	2	1	1	9	4	+5	5
Brazil	4	2	1	1	6	4	+2	5
Uruguay	4	2	1	1	4	5	-1	5
West Germany	4	1	1	2	4	6	-2	3
Italy	4	1	0	3	4	8	-4	2

== Final ==
=== Match details ===
18 January 1987
20:00 UTC−6

Brazil	0–1	Argentina
		Felman 47'

Pacaembu Stadium, São Paulo
Attendance: 50,000
Referee: Walter Schneiller (West Germany)

Brazil	Argentina

GK	12	Renato
DF	19	Eurico
DF	2	Djalma Dias
DF	6	Alfredo	(substituted off) 75'
DF	4	Toninho
MF	17	Carpegiani
MF	14	Teodoro	(substituted off) 66'
FW	13	Lola	(substituted off) 75'
FW	9	Jairzinho	(substituted off) 46'
FW	8	Rivellino (c)
FW	11	Edu
Substitutes:
FW	21	Dadá Maravilha	(substituted on) 46'
FW	10	Pelé
DF	5	Gilberto Sorriso
DF	3	Marco Antônio
MF	15	Clodoaldo
GK	1	Ado
MF	7	Cafuringa
FW	16	Dicá
FW	22	Gil	(substituted on) 75'
MF	18	Chicão	(substituted on) 75'
FW	20	Romeu Evangelista	(substituted on) 66'
Manager:
(Brazil) Luciano do Valle

GK	1	Carlos Buttice
DF	8	Carlos Squeo
DF	15	Jorge Olguín
DF	3	Roberto Mouzo
DF	5	Osvaldo Cortés
MF	7	Miguel Ángel Brindisi	(substituted off) 77'
MF	11	José Orlando Berta (c)
MF	18	Carlos Babington	(substituted off) 77'
FW	19	Pedro Alexis González
FW	9	Darío Felman	(substituted off) 84'
FW	16	Oscar Más
Substitutes:
DF	6	Juan D. Rocchia	(substituted on) 77'
DF	2	Rafael Albrecht	(substituted on) 77'
FW	20	José Luis Cevallos	(substituted on) 84'
Manager:
(Argentina) Carmelo Faraone

== Goal scorers ==
2 goals

- (Brazil) Rivellino
- (Argentina) Oscar Más
- (Argentina) Darío Felman

== Champion ==
1987 World Cup of Masters
Champions

Argentina
First Title
