= II World Cup of Masters =

1993 World Cup of Masters
Pelé Cup '93

Tournament details
- Host country: Austria; Italy
- Dates: 2–11 July (10 days)
- Teams: 8 (from 2 confederations)
- Venue: 2 (in 2 host cities)

Final positions
- Champions: Italy (1st title)
- Runners-up: Austria
- Third place: Germany
- Fourth place: Brazil

Tournament statistics
- Matches played: 16
- Goals scored: 49 (3.06 per match)
- Top scorer: (Austria) Walter Schachner (8 goals)
- Best player: (Italy) Franco Causio

The fifth edition of the World Cup of Masters was held jointly in Austria and Italy. It was played in July 1993. This time the edition was expanded to eight "Masters" teams, each playing in two groups of fours with the group winners facing each other in the final. The teams were reigning champions Brazil, Argentina, Netherlands, hosts Italy and Austria (playing in their first tournament) Germany, Uruguay and England. The event was won by hosts Italy, winning their only title in the event.

== Squads ==
For the list of the squads, see 1993 Copa Pelé squads.

== Group A ==
Group A was held in Trieste, Italy.

2 July 1993

| Brazil | 1–1 | Netherlands |
|---|---|---|
| Wladimir | | René van de Kerkhof |

Stadio Nereo Rocco, Trieste, Italy

| England | 0–1 | Italy |

Stadio Nereo Rocco, Trieste, Italy

4 July 1993

| Brazil | 0–0 | England |

Stadio Nereo Rocco, Trieste, Italy

| Netherlands | 2–3 | Italy |

Stadio Nereo Rocco, Trieste, Italy

6 July 1993

| Brazil | 1–0 | Italy |
|---|---|---|
| Claudio Gentile 35' o.g. |

Stadio Nereo Rocco, Trieste, Italy

| Netherlands | 2–3 | England |
|---|---|---|
| Mühren 22 ' Schoenaker 45' | | Blissett 41 ' 85 ' Worthington 82' |

Stadio Nereo Rocco, Trieste, Italy

| Team | Pld | W | D | L | GF | GA | GD | Pts |
|---|---|---|---|---|---|---|---|---|
| Italy | 3 | 2 | 0 | 1 | 4 | 3 | +1 | 4 |
| Brazil | 3 | 1 | 2 | 0 | 2 | 1 | +1 | 4 |
| England | 3 | 1 | 1 | 1 | 3 | 3 | 0 | 3 |
| Netherlands | 3 | 0 | 1 | 2 | 5 | 7 | -2 | 1 |

== Group B ==
Group B was held in Klagenfurt, Austria.

3 July 1993

| Austria | 1–1 | Argentina |
|---|---|---|
| Schachner 51 ' | | Brailovsky 41 ' |

Wörtherseestadion, Klagenfurt

| Germany | 2–0 | Uruguay |

Wörtherseestadion, Klagenfurt

5 July 1993

| Austria | 4–2 | Germany |
|---|---|---|
| Schachner 27 ', 87'; Krankl 29 (p)' Dihanich 80' | | Răducanu 17'; Kelsch 22' |

Wörtherseestadion, Klagenfurt

| Uruguay | 1–0 | Argentina |

Wörtherseestadion, Klagenfurt

7 July 1993

| Germany | 5–2 | Argentina |
|---|---|---|
| Kutzop 16 (p) ' Allofs 35 ', 41'; Förster 80 ' Kaminke 89 ' | | Commelles 40 ' Kempes 87 ' |

Wörtherseestadion, Klagenfurt

| Austria | 6–2 | Uruguay |
|---|---|---|
| Kreuz 7 ' Prohaska 20'; Schachner 26 ' 33 ' Baumeister 45'; Hintermaier 37' | | Naidenov 30'; Yeladian 64' |

Wörtherseestadion, Klagenfurt

| Team | Pld | W | D | L | GF | GA | GD | Pts |
|---|---|---|---|---|---|---|---|---|
| Austria | 3 | 2 | 1 | 0 | 11 | 5 | +6 | 5 |
| Germany | 3 | 2 | 0 | 1 | 9 | 6 | +3 | 4 |
| Uruguay | 3 | 1 | 0 | 2 | 3 | 8 | -5 | 2 |
| Argentina | 3 | 0 | 1 | 2 | 3 | 7 | -4 | 1 |

== Semi-finals ==
9 July 1993

| Austria | 3–1 | Brazil |
|---|---|---|
| Schachner | | Serginho |

Wörtherseestadion, Klagenfurt
9 July 1993

| Italy | 2–1 | Germany |
|---|---|---|
| Rossi; Dossena | | Rummenigge |

Stadio Nereo Rocco, Trieste

== Third Place Play Off ==
11 July 1993

| Brazil | – | Germany |

Stadio Nereo Rocco, Trieste

Brazil refused to play in the third place play off, disputing the matter in which they failed to qualify for the final.

== Final ==
11 July 1993
21:00 CEST

| Italy | 2-0 | Austria |
|---|---|---|
| Sara (o.g.); Causio 87 )p)' |

Stadio Nereo Rocco, Trieste
Attendance: 20,000
Referee: Darko Jamšek (Slovenia)

| Italy | Austria |

| GK | 1 | Ivano Bordon |
| DF | 6 | Claudio Gentile |
| DF | 4 | Antonio Cabrini |
| DF | 6 | Paolo Beruatto |
| MF | 11 | Giampiero Marini |
| MF | 16 | Bruno Conti (c) |
| MF | 10 | Giuseppe Dossena |
| MF | 15 | Franco Causio | | (substituted on) 89' |
| FW | 19 | Francesco Graziani | (substituted off) 7' |
| FW | 20 | Paolo Rossi |
| FW | 18 | Alessandro Altobelli | (substituted on) 7' | (substituted off) 89' |
Substitutions:
| MF | 13 | Gabriele Oriali |
Manager:
Enzo Bearzot

| GK | 1 | Klaus Lindenberger |
| DF | 15 | Reinhold Hintermaier |
| DF | 20 | Josef Sara |
| DF | 4 | Dieter Mirnegg |
| DF | 5 | Robert Sara |
| MF | 6 | Wilhelm Kreuz | (yellow card) 61' | (substituted off) 62' |
| MF | 3 | Herbert Prohaska |
| MF | 2 | Ernst Baumeister |
| FW | 11 | Johann Dihanich (c) | | (substituted off) 70' |
| FW | 7 | Walter Schachner |
| FW | 8 | Hans Krankl |
Substitutions:
| DF | 12 | Bruno Pezzey |
| MF | 10 | Hansi Müller | | (substituted on) 70' |
| FW | 9 | Kurt Welzl | | (substituted on) 62' |
Manager:
Franz Hasil

== Goal scorers ==
8 goals

- (Austria) Walter Schachner

3 goals

- (Italy) Franco Causio

== Champion ==
World Cup of Masters Champions:

Italy
First title
