= Naydenov =

Naydenov, Naidenov or Naydyonov (Russian: Найдёнов; Bulgarian: Найденов) is a Slavic masculine surname, its feminine counterpart is Naydenova, Naidenova or Naydyonova. It may refer to

- Aleksandrina Naydenova (born 1992), Bulgarian tennis player
- Arsen Naydyonov (1941–2010), Russian football coach
- Georgi Naydenov (businessman) (1927–1998), Bulgarian businessman and banker
- Georgi Naydenov (footballer, born 1931) (1931–1970), Bulgarian football goalkeeper and manager
- Ivan Naydenov (born 1981), Bulgarian football player
- Ivaylo Naydenov (born 1998), Bulgarian football player
- Izabela Naydenova, Bulgarian holography researcher
- Luis Petcoff Naidenoff (born 1967), Argentine politician of Bulgarian descent
- Lyudmil Naidenov (born 1970), Bulgarian volleyball player
- Marius Naydenov (born 1994), Bulgarian football player
- Miroslav Naydenov, Bulgarian politician
- Nayden Naydenov (born 1967), Bulgarian volleyball player
- Nikolay Naydenov (born 1974), Bulgarian volleyball player
- Nikita Naidenov (1892–1961), Russian speed skater and aviator
- Olga Naidenova (born 1987), Russian figure skater
- Sergey Naydyonov (1868–1922), Russian playwright
- Stefan Naydenov (1957–2010), Bulgarian football player
- Tihomir Naydenov (born 1986), Bulgarian football midfielder
- Tsvetelina Naydenova (born 1994), Bulgarian rhythmic gymnast
- Valentin Naydenov (born 1972), Bulgarian football player
- Vasil Naydenov, Bulgarian singer-songwriter
- Vira Naydyonova (1948–2016), Ukrainian industrialist
