= III World Cup of Masters =

1995 World Cup of Masters
Pelé Cup '95

Tournament details
- Host country: Austria
- Dates: 23 June – 2 July (10 days)
- Teams: 8 (from 2 confederations)
- Venue: 2 (in 2 host cities)

Final positions
- Champions: Brazil (4th title)
- Runners-up: Argentina
- Third place: Germany
- Fourth place: Italy

Tournament statistics
- Matches played: 16
- Goals scored: 38 (2.38 per match)
- Best player: (Brazil) Paulo Isidoro

The sixth edition of the World Cup of Masters was held in Klagenfurt and Kapfenberg, Austria. This was the second time Austria had hosted the event. It was the final event held. The nations taking part were hosts Austria, reigning champions Italy, Brazil, Argentina, Netherlands, Germany and for the first time France and Portugal. The event was won by Brazil, winning their fourth title overall.

== Group A ==
Group A was held in Wörtherseestadion, Klagenfurt.

23 June 1995

Netherlands	2–2	Italy

Klagenfurt, Austria

Austria	1–1	Brazil

Klagenfurt, Austria

25 June 1995

Italy	2–1	Brazil

Klagenfurt, Austria

Netherlands	1–1	Austria

Klagenfurt, Austria

27 June 1995

Brazil	3–1	Netherlands

Klagenfurt, Austria

Austria	0–0	Italy

Klagenfurt, Austria

Team	Pld	W	D	L	GF	GA	GD	Pts
Italy	3	1	2	0	4	3	+1	5
Brazil	3	1	1	1	5	4	+1	4
Austria	3	0	3	0	3	3	0	3
Netherlands	3	0	2	1	4	6	-2	2

== Group B ==
Group B was held in Franz Fekete Stadium, Kapfenberg.

23 June 1995

Germany	1–0	Portugal

Kapfenberg, Austria

France	0–0	Argentina

Kapfenberg, Austria

25 June 1995

Argentina	3–0	Germany

Kapfenberg, Austria

France	4–1	Portugal

Kapfenberg, Austria

27 June 1995

Argentina	0–0	Portugal

Kapfenberg, Austria

France	3–4	Germany

Kapfenberg, Austria

Team	Pld	W	D	L	GF	GA	GD	Pts
Germany	3	2	0	1	5	6	-1	6
Argentina	3	1	2	0	3	0	+3	5
France	3	1	1	1	7	5	+2	4
Portugal	3	0	1	2	1	5	-4	1

== Semi-finals ==
29 June 1995

Germany	0–3	Brazil

Franz Fekete Stadium, Kapfenberg

Italy	1–1	Argentina
Penalties
	3–5

Franz Fekete Stadium, Kapfenberg

== Third-place play-off ==
1 July 1995

Italy	–	Germany

Franz Fekete Stadium, Kapfenberg

The pitch failed to pass the referees initial inspection and the match was not played. Attempts to rearrange it were unsuccessful.

== Final ==
2 July 1995

Brazil	1–1	Argentina
Paulo Isidoro		Commisso
Penalties
	3–2

Wörtherseestadion, Klagenfurt

Brazil	Argentina

== Champion ==
World Cup of Masters Champions:

Brazil
Fourth title
