= Angelo Marchi =

Italian footballer (born 1950)

Personal information
- Date of birth: 28 February 1950 (age 76)
- Place of birth: Rho, Italy
- Height: 1.82 m (5 ft 11 1/2 in)
- Position: Striker

Senior career*
| Years | Team | Apps | (Gls) |
| 1969–1970 | Milan | 1 | (0) |
| 1970–1978 | Lecco | 242 | (39) |

International career
| 1970 | Italy U-21 | 1 | (0) |
- * Club domestic league appearances and goals

Angelo Marchi (born 28 February 1950 in Rho) is a retired Italian professional football player.

He played one game in the Serie A in the 1969/70 season for A.C. Milan.
