= Marius Naydenov =

Bulgarian footballer

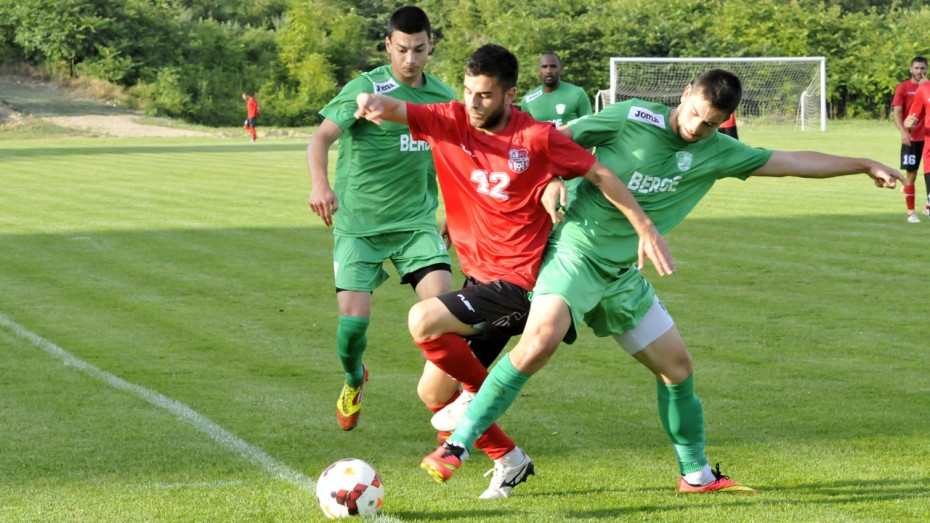

Personal information
- Date of birth: 10 July 1994 (age 32)
- Place of birth: Haskovo, Bulgaria
- Height: 1.75 m (5 ft 9 in)
- Position: Attacking midfielder

Youth career
- –2013: Haskovo

Senior career*
Years	Team	Apps	(Gls)
2013–2015	Haskovo	7	(0)
- * Club domestic league appearances and goals as of 29 May 2015

Marius Naydenov (Bulgarian: Мариус Найденов; born 10 July 1994) is a Bulgarian footballer who last played for Haskovo as a midfielder.

== Club ==
As of 3 December 2015

Club performance			League		Cup		Continental		Other		Total	
Club	League	Season	Apps	Goals	Apps	Goals	Apps	Goals	Apps	Goals	Apps	Goals
Bulgaria			League		Bulgarian Cup		Europe		Other (Note: Includes Bulgarian Supercup matches.)		Total	
Haskovo	B Group	2013–14	4	0	1	0	–		–		5	0
Haskovo	A Group	2014–15	3	0	2	0	–		–		5	0
Haskovo	Total		7	0	3	0	0	0	0	0	10	0
Career statistics			7	0	3	0	0	0	0	0	10	0
