= Chico Spina =

Brazilian footballer

Personal information
- Full name: Manoel Francisco de Andrade Spina
- Date of birth: 16 June 1955 (age 71)
- Place of birth: Porto Alegre, Brazil
- Height: 1.72 m (5 ft 8 in)
- Position: Forward

Youth career
- –1976: Grêmio

Senior career*
Years	Team	Apps	(Gls)
1976	Grêmio		
1977	Avaí		
1977–1978	Cruzeiro-RS		
1978–1980	Internacional		
1980	Paysandu		
1981	Atlético Mineiro		
1981–1985	Paysandu		
1985	Aimoré		
1986	Noroeste		
1987–1988	Inter de Limeira		
1988	XV de Piracicaba		
- * Club domestic league appearances and goals as of 17 January 2024

Manoel Francisco de Andrade Spina (born 16 June 1955), better known as Chico Spina, is a Brazilian former professional footballer who played as a forward.

== Career ==
Revealed at Grêmio, Chico Spina played for Avaí and Cruzeiro de Porto Alegre, before arriving at Internacional, where he was Brazilian champion in 1979. He also had notable spells at Atlético Mineiro and Paysandu. After retiring, he defended the Brazil masters team, acting as an attacking duo with Pelé on several occasions.

== Honours ==
Internacional

- Campeonato Brasileiro: 1979

Atlético Mineiro

- Campeonato Mineiro: 1981

Paysandu

- Campeonato Paraense: 1981
