= Eduardo Albuquerque (footballer) =

Brazilian footballer

- Eduardo lining up for Brazil in 1963

Personal information
- Full name: Eduardo Barbosa de Albuquerque
- Date of birth: 22 February 1943 (age 83)
- Place of birth: São Paulo, Brazil
- Position: Centre-back

Youth career
- 1957–1961: Corinthians

Senior career*
Years	Team	Apps	(Gls)
1961–1967	Corinthians	183	(0)
1967–1968	Cruzeiro	2	(0)
1968–1970	São Paulo	42	(0)
1971–1972	Náutico		

International career
1963–1965	Brazil	7	(0)
- * Club domestic league appearances and goals as of 12 October 2023

Eduardo Barbosa de Albuquerque (born 22 February 1943), also known as Eduardo Albuquerque or Eduardo, is a Brazilian former professional footballer who played as a centre-back.

== Career ==
Revealed at Corinthians, he played at the club for most of the 1960s, when he even reached the Brazil national team due to his extreme loyalty in his style of play. He also played for Cruzeiro, where he was part of the Minas Gerais state champion squad in 1968, and for São Paulo FC, Paulista champion in 1970. He ended his career at Náutico, without ever having scored a goal as a professional player.

== Personal life ==
After retiring, he worked with graphic productions in the city of Santana de Parnaíba.

== Honours ==
Corinthians

- Taça São Paulo: 1962

Cruzeiro

- Campeonato Mineiro: 1968

São Paulo

- Campeonato Paulista: 1970
