= Carlos Buttice =

Argentine footballer

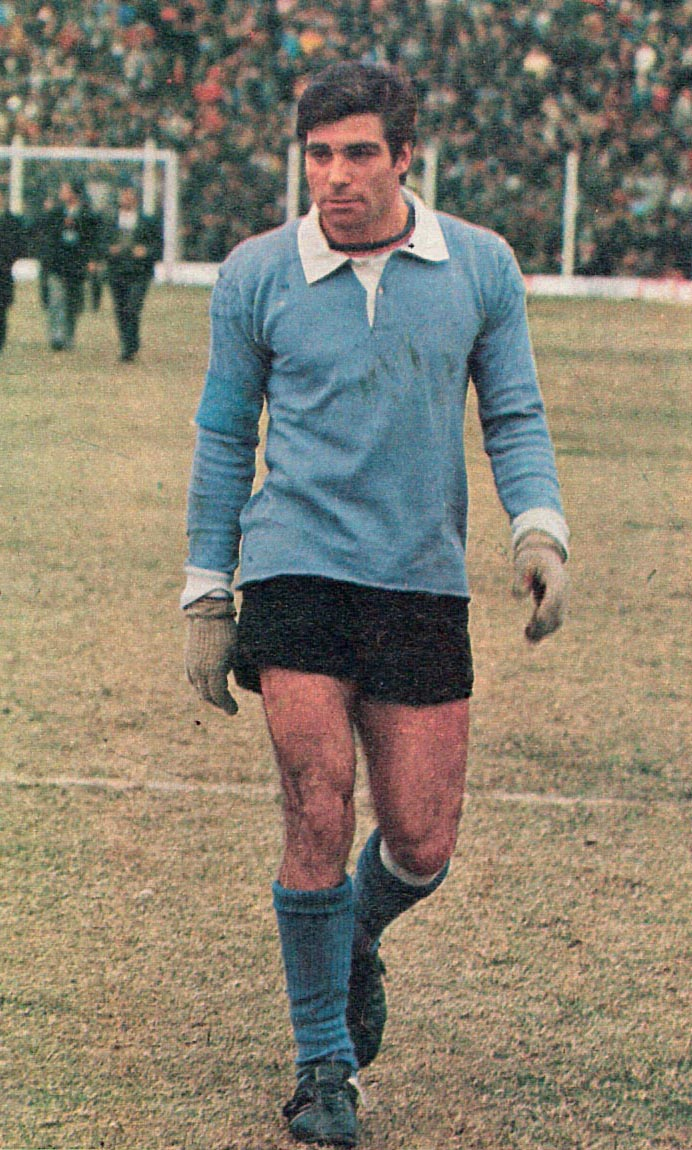
- Buttice in 1968

Personal information
- Full name: Carlos Adolfo Buttice
- Date of birth: 17 December 1942
- Place of birth: Monte Grande, Argentina
- Date of death: 3 August 2018 (aged 75)
- Position: Goalkeeper

Senior career*
Years	Team	Apps	(Gls)
1964	Los Andes	7	(0)
1965	Huracán	24	(0)
1966–1970	San Lorenzo	183	(0)
1971	America-RJ	7	(0)
1972–1974	Bahia	55	(0)
1974	Corinthians	14	(0)
1975	Atlanta	41	(0)
1976	Gimnasia La Plata	29	(0)
1977	Unión Española	0	(0)
1981–1982	Banfield	71	(0)
1983	Colón	19	(0)
1984–1985	Peñarol MdP	–	(–)

International career
1967–1968	Argentina	4	(0)
- * Club domestic league appearances and goals

Carlos Adolfo Buttice (17 December 1942 – 3 August 2018) was a football goalkeeper.

== Career ==
Buttice played for clubs of Argentina, Brazil and Chile. In his homeland, he played for Los Andes, Huracán, San Lorenzo, Atlanta, Gimnasia y Esgrima de La Plata, Banfield, Colón and Peñarol de Mar del Plata.

In Brazil, Buttice played for America-RJ, Bahia and Corinthians.

In Chile, Buttice played for Unión Española. He was part of the 1977 Unión Española team that won the Primera División de Chile.

At international level, Buttice earned four caps for the Argentina national team.

== Personal life ==
Buttice was nicknamed Batman.

== Titles ==
Season	Team	Title
1968	San Lorenzo	Torneo Metropolitano
1971	Bahia	Campeonato Baiano
1973	Bahia	Campeonato Baiano
1977	Unión Española	Primera División de Chile
