= Juan Morales (Uruguayan footballer) =

Uruguayan footballer (1956–2020)

Juan Vicente Morales
Personal information
- Date of birth: 18 April 1956
- Place of birth: Paysandú, Uruguay
- Date of death: 11 September 2020 (aged 64)
- Place of death: Montevideo, Uruguay
- Position: Left back

Senior career*
Years	Team	Apps	(Gls)
1974–1976	Cerro	38	(3)
1977–1983	Peñarol	181	(6)
1984	Talleres	12	(0)
1985	Cerro	13	(0)

International career
1975–1980	Uruguay	15	(1)
- * Club domestic league appearances and goals

Juan Morales (18 April 1956 – 11 September 2020) was a Uruguayan footballer. He played in fifteen matches for the Uruguay national football team from 1975 to 1980. At a club level, he played for Cerro, Peñarol and Talleres He was also part of Uruguay's squad for the 1975 Copa América tournament.
