= Cláudio Adão =

Brazilian footballer (born 1955)

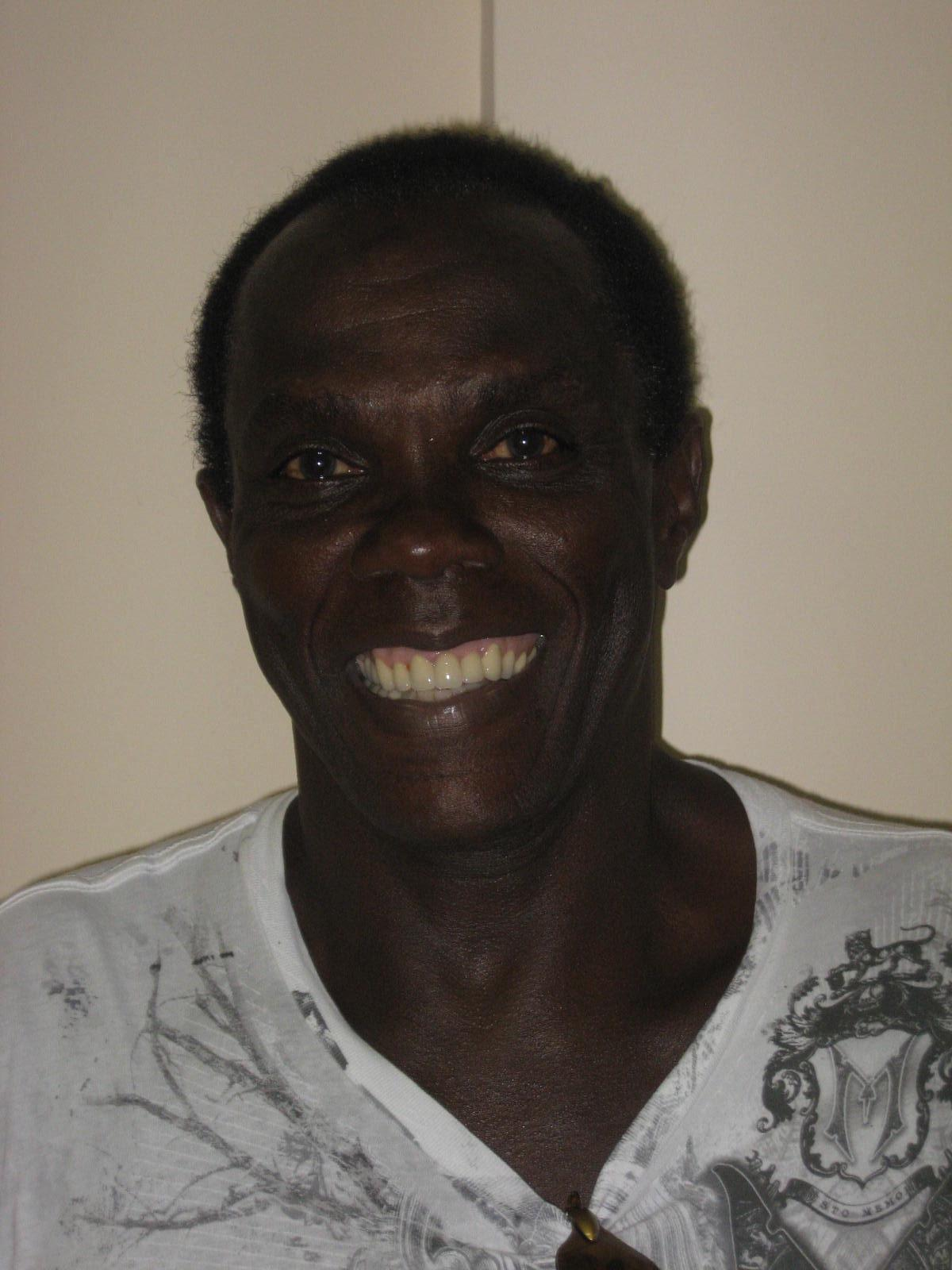
- Cláudio Adão

Personal information
- Full name: Cláudio Adalberto Adão
- Date of birth: 2 July 1955 (age 71)
- Place of birth: Volta Redonda (RJ) Brazil
- Position: Forward

Senior career*
Years	Team	Apps	(Gls)
1972–1976	Santos	134	(51)
1977–1980	Flamengo	147	(82)
1980	Botafogo		
1980	Austria Wien		
1980–1981	Fluminense		
1982	Vasco da Gama		
1982–1983	Al Ain	49	(32)
1983	Benfica		
1983	Flamengo	0	(0)
1984	Botafogo		
1984	Bangu		
1985	Vasco da Gama		
1985	Bangu		
1986	Bahia		
1987	Cruzeiro		
1988	Botafogo		
1988	Portuguesa		
1989	Corinthians		
1990	Sport Boys		
1991	Bahia		
1992–1993	Campo Grande		
1993	Ceará		
1993	Santa Cruz		
1993	Volta Redonda		
1994	Deportivo Sipesa		
1994	Rio Branco		
1995	Volta Redonda		
1995	Desportiva		
1996	Volta Redonda		

International career
1975–1976	Brazil	12	(14)

Managerial career
- 1997: Sport Boys
- 2001: CSA
- 2006: Volta Redonda
- 2007: Metropolitano
- 2009: Ferroviário-PE
- 2010: Duquecaxiense
- 2012: Legião
- 2012: Atlético Paranaense (Beach soccer)
- 2013: Mixto
- * Club domestic league appearances and goals

Cláudio Adalberto Adão, or simply Cláudio Adão (born in Volta Redonda, 2 July 1955), is a former Brazilian football player. A gifted forward, Adão was the top-scorer of almost every championship he's played.

His first professional club was Santos FC, where he arrived in 1972. When Pelé left Santos in 1974, the club predicted a brilliant future ahead for Adão as Pelé's natural replacement. But they couldn't predict Adão would suffer a serious injury that would leave him off of the pitch for several months.

Physicians believed Adão's career to be prematurely ended when Flamengo's coach, Cláudio Coutinho (who was himself a physical fitness expert) asked his club to sign Adão.

Santos let Adão go and, at Flamengo, he underwent intensive physical therapy. The results were fantastic and Adão quickly became an idol. Not only at Flamengo, but in every other club he has played for until he retired, hundreds of goals later, at almost 40 years old.

In Brazil, Adão played for Botafogo, Vasco, Fluminense, Portuguesa-SP, Corinthians, Bangu, EC Bahia, Cruzeiro, Portuguesa-RJ, Campo Grande-RJ, Ceará SC, Santa Cruz, Volta Redonda FC, Rio Branco-RJ and Desportiva-ES.

His international career included FK Austria Wien, Al Ain FC, Benfica and Sport Boys.

Adão further represented Brazil in the 1989 edition of the World Cup of Masters, scoring a hat trick in the final against Uruguay.

After retirement, he managed several clubs, CSA, Ceará, Rio Branco-ES, and Volta Redonda FC, his current club. As Rio Branco-ES manager, they won the 2001 Campeonato Capixaba.

== See also ==
- Felipe Adão his son
