= Lola (footballer) =

Brazilian footballer (born 1950)

Personal information
- Full name: Raimundo José Correia
- Date of birth: 2 January 1950 (age 76)
- Place of birth: Iguatama, Brazil
- Height: 1.69 m (5 ft 7 in)
- Position: Midfielder

Youth career
- 1966–?: Clube Atlético Mineiro

Senior career*
Years	Team	Apps	(Gls)
?–1972	Clube Atlético Mineiro		
1973–1974	Guarani FC		
1974–1976	Club América		
1976–1978	Tigres UANL		
1978–1980	Ponte Preta		
1980	Sport Club do Recife		
1981	Ponte Preta		
1982	Maringá-PR		
1983	Botafogo-SP		
- * Club domestic league appearances and goals

Raimundo José Correia (born 2 January 1950), best known as Lola, is a former Brazilian association football player. He currently works as a university professor in Ribeirão Preto and as a talent scout.

He was selected for the Brazil national team for a friendly against Yugoslavia on 19 December 1968.
