= Mário Sérgio (footballer, born 1950) =

Brazilian football player & manager (1950–2016)

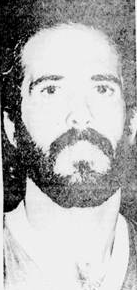
- Mário Sérgio in 1979

Personal information
- Full name: Mário Sérgio Pontes de Paiva
- Date of birth: 7 September 1950
- Place of birth: Rio de Janeiro, Brazil
- Date of death: 28 November 2016 (aged 66)
- Place of death: La Unión, Antioquia, Colombia
- Position: Midfielder

Youth career
- 1968–1969: Flamengo

Senior career*
Years	Team	Apps	(Gls)
1970	Flamengo	5	(1)
1971–1975	Vitória	82	(6)
1975–1976	Fluminense	14	(0)
1976–1979	Botafogo	20	(3)
1979	Rosario Central	0	(0)
1979–1981	Internacional	53	(4)
1981–1982	São Paulo	11	(1)
1982–1983	Ponte Preta	7	(1)
1983	Grêmio	0	(0)
1984	Internacional	8	(1)
1984–1985	Palmeiras	11	(1)
1986	Botafogo (SP)	0	(0)
1986	AC Bellinzona	0	(0)
1987	Bahia	1	(0)

International career
1981–1985	Brazil	8	(0)

Managerial career
- 1987: Vitória
- 1993–1995: Corinthians
- 1998: São Paulo
- 2001: Vitória
- 2001: Atlético Paranaense
- 2002–2003: São Caetano
- 2003–2004: Atlético Paranaense
- 2004: Atlético Mineiro
- 2007: Figueirense
- 2007: Botafogo
- 2008: Atlético Paranaense
- 2008: Figueirense
- 2009: Portuguesa
- 2009: Internacional
- 2010: Ceará
- * Club domestic league appearances and goals

Mário Sérgio Pontes de Paiva (7 September 1950 – 28 November 2016), known as Mário Sérgio, was a Brazilian football player and manager. He later became a commentator for Fox Sports Brazil, which he joined at the channel's inception in 2012. He died in the LaMia Airlines Flight 2933 accident in the Colombian village of Cerro Gordo, La Unión, Antioquia, while travelling with the Chapecoense football squad for the Copa Sudamericana finals on 28 November 2016.

== Career ==
=== Playing career ===
Mário Sérgio began his career in football with local club Flamengo, although he didn't make a first team appearance for the team. After two years at the club, the Brazilian midfielder moved north from Rio to Salvador based club Vitória where he made over 80 league appearances, and won the Campeonato Baiano league in 1972, in his five-year stint with the club. In 1975, the Brazilian was transferred for the second time in his career, this time to his former club, Flamengo's rivals: Fluminense. The midfielder, played fourteen times in his two years back in Rio, which included a second league title win of his career after his team secured the Campeonato Carioca title in 1975. But he soon began transferring to eight clubs across Brazil and one in Argentina, Rosario Central, for the next decade where he stayed for a maximum of three years.

During this time, Sérgio made his international début for Brazil in 1981 and picked up a number of honours at club level, including: a Campeonato Brasileiro Série A league title in 1979, the highest league in Brazilian football; two Campeonato Gaúcho league titles in 1981 and 1984 and an Intercontinental Cup with Grêmio in 1983 after his side beat Hamburger SV 2–1.

After a brief spell in Europe with Swiss team AC Bellinzona, the Brazilian moved back to Brazil with Esporte Clube Bahia in 1987 where he would make one final league appearance before retiring that year.

=== Managerial career ===
After retiring in 1987, Sérgio embarked on a career in coaching with roles at his former clubs Vitória and São Paulo as well as with Corinthians, Atlético Paranaense and Atlético Mineiro. In 2007, Mário Sérgio assumed control of Figueirense Futebol Clube. Sérgio, however would only stay there for six months where he led his team to the final of the Copa do Brasil before losing in the final 2–1 on aggregate to Fluminense. But, unable to maintain this consistency, he left his role later that year. Only weeks after leaving the club, Sérgio found a new managerial job, this time with Botafogo, a club he had played for as a player. The job would only last until early the following month after he had only managed the team for three league matches: all of them losses. In 2008, after briefly working as Atlético Paranaense's manager, on 16 September he was hired as Figueirense's manager. Portuguesa had sacked coach Estevam Soares and hired the former Figueirense coach. On 6 March 2009 Portuguesa officials fired the coach after five wins, five draws and two losses.

On 5 October 2009, Sérgio was announced as Internacional new coach. He remained with the team until the end of the 2009 Campeonato Brasileiro Série A, where Inter finished as runners-up to Flamengo. Sérgio's contract was not renewed for 2010, and he wound up hired by Ceará. By September, with Ceará only at 11th in the Brasileirão, Sérgio was fired.

== Honours ==
=== Player ===
Flamengo

- Taça Guanabara: 1970

Vitória

- Campeonato Baiano: 1972

Fluminense

- Campeonato Carioca: 1975, 1976

São Paulo

- Campeonato Paulista: 1981

Internacional

- Campeonato Brasileiro Série A: 1979
- Campeonato Gaúcho: 1981, 1984
- Kirin Cup: 1984

Grêmio

- Intercontinental Cup: 1983

Individual

- Brazilian Bola de Prata (Placar): 1973, 1974, 1980, 1981
