= Paulo Isidoro =

Brazilian footballer (born 1953)

Personal information
- Full name: Paulo Isidoro de Jesus
- Date of birth: 3 August 1953 (age 73)
- Place of birth: Belo Horizonte, Brazil
- Position: Midfielder

International career
| Years | Team | Apps | (Gls) |
| 1977–1983 | Brazil | 41 | (3) |

Paulo Isidoro de Jesus (born 3 August 1953), known as Paulo Isidoro, is a Brazilian former association footballer who played as an offensive midfielder.

In 1981, he received the Bola de Ouro award. He was capped 41 times with the Brazil national team between June 1977 and July 1983, and played in four out of the team's five matches at the 1982 FIFA World Cup, always as a substitute (usually for Serginho Chulapa).

== Clubs ==
- 1975–1980 : Clube Atlético Mineiro
- 1980–1983 : Grêmio Foot-Ball Porto Alegrense
- 1983–1985 : Santos FC
- 1985–1988 : Guarani Futebol Clube
- 1989–1989 : Esporte Clube XV de Jaú
- 1989–1990 : Cruzeiro Esporte Clube
- 1991–1992 : Associação Atlética Internacional (Limeira)
- 1992–1997 : Valeriodoce Esporte Clube

== Career statistics ==
=== International ===
Scores and results list Brazil's goal tally first, score column indicates score after each Paulo Isidoro goal.

List of international goals scored by Paulo Isidoro
| No. | Date | Venue | Opponent | Score | Result | Competition |
|---|---|---|---|---|---|---|
| 1 | 19 June 1977 | Estádio do Morumbi, São Paulo, Brazil | Poland | 1–0 | 3–1 | Friendly |
| 2 | 26 January 1982 | Machadão, Natal, Brazil | East Germany | 1–1 | 3–1 | Friendly |
| 3 | 12 June 1983 | Ninian Park, Cardiff, Wales | Wales | 1–0 | 1–1 | Friendly |

== Honours ==
=== Club ===
Nacional-AM

- Campeonato Amazonense: 1974

Clube Atlético Mineiro

- Campeonato Mineiro: 1976, 1978, 1979, 1985, 1986
- Copa dos Campeões da Copa Brasil: 1978

Grêmio Foot-Ball Porto Alegrense

- Campeonato Gaúcho (Rio Grande do Sul State Championship): 1980
- Campeonato Brasileiro Série A (Brazilian championship): 1981

Santos FC

- Campeonato Paulista (São Paulo State Championship): 1984

Cruzeiro Esporte Clube

- Campeonato Mineiro: 1990

=== Individual ===
- Brazilian Golden Ball: 1981
- Brazilian Silver Ball: 1976, 1981, 1983
