= Batista (footballer, born 1955) =

Brazilian footballer

Personal information
- Full name: João Batista da Silva
- Date of birth: 8 March 1955 (age 71)
- Place of birth: Porto Alegre, Brazil
- Height: 1.75 m (5 ft 9 in)
- Position: Defensive midfielder

Senior career*
Years	Team	Apps	(Gls)
1973–1981	Internacional	172	(9)
1982	Grêmio	23	(0)
1983	Palmeiras	12	(2)
1983–1985	Lazio	43	(2)
1985	Avellino	14	(1)
1985–1987	Belenenses	8	(0)
1988–1989	Avaí	8	(0)
Total		280	(14)

International career
1975–1976	Brazil Olympic	18	(1)
1978–1983	Brazil	38	(0)
Medal record
Pan American Games
Gold medal – first place	1975 Mexico City	Team competition
- * Club domestic league appearances and goals

João Batista da Silva (born 8 March 1955), known as Batista, is a Brazilian former professional footballer who played as a defensive midfielder.

He competed in the men's tournament at the 1976 Summer Olympics and won a gold medal in football at the 1975 Pan American Games.

== Club career ==
Throughout his club career, Batista played for several clubs, mainly[ in Brazil, but also in Italy and Portugal, namely: Internacional (1973–1981), Grêmio (1982), Palmeiras (1983), Lazio (1983–1985), Avellino (1985), Belenenses (1985–1987), and Avaí (1988–1989). During his time with Internacional, he won three Campeonato Brasileiro Série A titles, in 1975, 1976, and 1979.

== International career ==
Batista competed in the men's tournament at the 1976 Summer Olympics, where Brazil finished in fourth place, and he also won a gold medal in football at the 1975 Pan American Games.

Batista won 38 senior international caps for Brazil from April 1978 to June 1983, but did not score a goal. He played also in two editions of the FIFA World Cup, in 1978 and 1982. In the 1978 tournament, Batista played throughout all seven of Brazil's matches, with the team not losing a single match, and only conceding three goals. Brazil failed to qualify for the final on goal difference, eventually finishing the tournament in third place.

In the 1982 World Cup, Batista was a reserve. He played once as a substitute for Zico, coming on in the final minutes of the team's second–round match against Argentina. Famously, Diego Maradona was sent off for his foul on Batista after Batista had flattened Juan Barbas.

He was also a member of the Brazil team that finished in third place at the 1979 Copa América.

== Style of play ==
Batista usually played as a defensive midfielder, where he was known for his ability to aid his team defensively, but also had the capacity to help build attacking plays after winning back possession. However, he was also known for his lack of pace.

== After retirement ==
Since retiring, Batista has been working as a commentator for Brazilian television channel RBS, which is part of the Globo TV circuit.

== Honours ==
Internacional

- Campeonato Gaúcho: 1975, 1976, 1978, 1981
- Campeonato Brasileiro Série A: 1975, 1976, 1979

Avaí

- Campeonato Catarinense: 1988

Individual

- Bola de Prata: 1980, 1982
