= Fernando Morena =

Uruguayan footballer (born 1952)

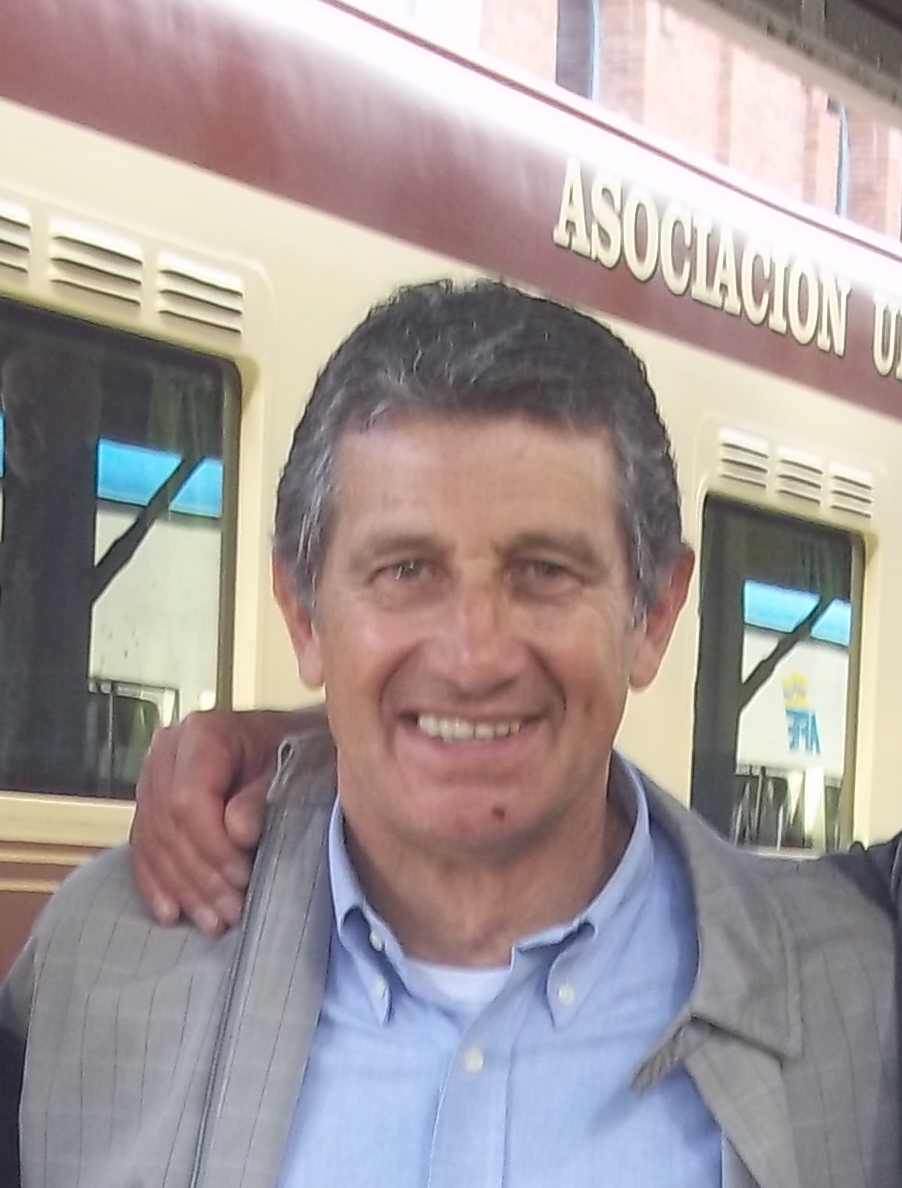
- Morena in 2011

Personal information
- Full name: Fernando Morena Belora
- Date of birth: 2 February 1952 (age 74)
- Place of birth: Punta Gorda, Montevideo, Uruguay
- Height: 1.77 m (5 ft 10 in)
- Position: Striker

Senior career*
Years	Team	Apps	(Gls)
1968	Racing Montevideo		
1969–1972	River Plate Montevideo	48	(27)
1973–1979	Peñarol	140	(162)
1979–1980	Rayo Vallecano	34	(21)
1980–1981	Valencia	31	(16)
1981–1983	Peñarol	50	(39)
1984	Boca Juniors	7	(1)
1984	Peñarol	6	(2)
Total		316	(268)

International career
1971–1983	Uruguay	53	(22)

Managerial career
- 1988: Peñarol
- 1989: Huracán Buceo
- 1991: Real Murcia
- 1996–1998: River Plate Montevideo
- 1999–2000: Colo-Colo
- 2003: River Plate Montevideo
- 2005: Peñarol
Medal record
Representing Uruguay
Copa América
Winner	1983
- * Club domestic league appearances and goals

Fernando Morena Belora (born 2 February 1952) is a Uruguayan former professional footballer who played as a striker. His most known nicknames were "Nando" (abridged form of Fernando) and "Potrillo" (Colt, although young stallion is a better translation in this case), and he is the all-time top goal scorer in the history of the Uruguayan Primera División with 230 goals in 244 games. He scored 268 in his almost 20-year career.

== Club career ==
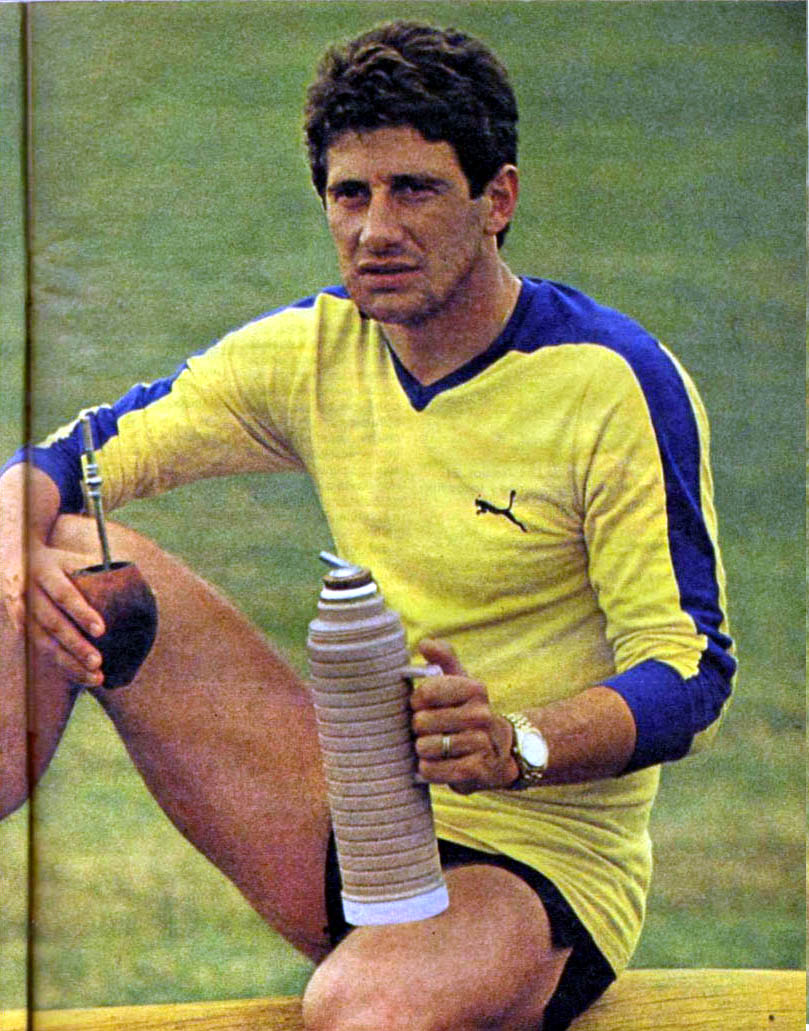
Morena drinking mate in 1982

Fernando Morena started as a professional football player in 1968 with Racing Club de Montevideo, which he left in 1969, signing for the nearby team, River Plate from Montevideo, where he played until 1972. Morena joined Peñarol in 1973. In his first run with the club, he won four Uruguayan Primera championships. He was the top scorer in the Uruguayan soccer league for six consecutive years between 1973 and 1978, and was the top scorer in the Copa Libertadores in 1974 and 1975.

In 1979, Fernando Morena signed up with the Spanish team Rayo Vallecano, but spent just one season there before changing to Valencia in 1980. Morena returned to Peñarol in 1981, where he helped the team win two more Uruguayan league titles in 1981 and 1982. They also won the Copa de Oro in 1981, the Copa Libertadores in 1982, and the 1982 Intercontinental Cup.

In 1983, Fernando Morena joined the Brazilian soccer team Flamengo and in 1984, he played for Boca Juniors of Argentina. He finished his professional career in Peñarol in 1985.

== International career ==
Fernando made his debut for the Uruguay national team on 27 October 1971 against Chile in a 3–0 win, where he scored his first goal. He was part of the national team that represented Uruguay at the 1974 World Cup. He went on to obtain a total of 54 international caps, scoring 22 goals which currently ranks him as the joint eighth-highest scorer in the history of the team. On 4 September 1983, Morena suffered a tibia and fibula fracture when playing against Venezuela for the Copa America. He never played for the national team after that incident, though he is still officially considered a part of the Uruguayan team that won the Copa América in 1983.

== Coaching career ==
After retiring, he held several coaching positions in Uruguay, Spain and Chile. His first coaching job was in River Plate, which was followed by Peñarol, Real Murcia in Spain, Huracán Buceo, Rampla Juniors, Colo Colo in Chile and a second run in Peñarol in 2005. In 2009, he was designated as Manager of Institutional Relations at Peñarol.

== Career statistics ==
=== International ===
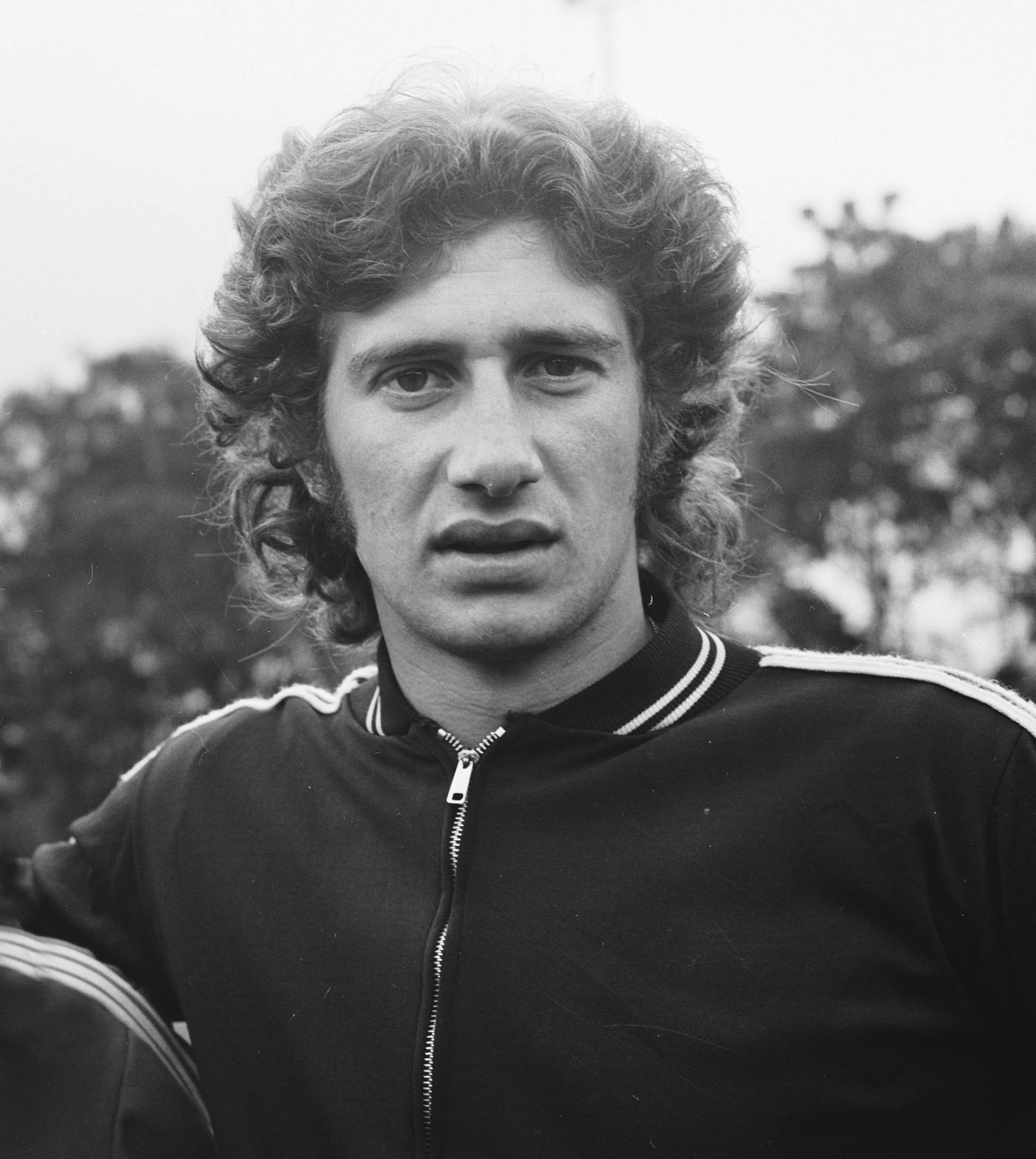
Morena with Uruguay at the 1974 World Cup

Appearances and goals by national team and year
National team	Year	Apps	Goals
Uruguay	1971	1	1
Uruguay	1972	5	0
Uruguay	1973	8	5
Uruguay	1974	10	7
Uruguay	1975	5	3
Uruguay	1976	10	0
Uruguay	1977	6	2
Uruguay	1978	3	1
Uruguay	1979	0	0
Uruguay	1980	0	0
Uruguay	1981	0	0
Uruguay	1982	0	0
Uruguay	1983	5	3
Total		53	22

== Honours ==
=== Club ===
Peñarol

- Uruguayan Primera División (6): 1973, 1974, 1975, 1978, 1981, 1982
- Copa Libertadores: 1982
- Intercontinental Cup: 1982

Valencia

- European Super Cup: 1980

=== International ===
Uruguay

- Copa América: 1983

=== Individual ===
- Uruguayan Primera División top scorer (7): 1973, 1974, 1975, 1976, 1977, 1978, 1982
- Copa Libertadores top scorer: 1974, 1975, 1982
- South American Footballer of the Year Bronze Award: 1975

== Records ==
- He scored 230 goals in Uruguayan championships, making him the highest scoring player in the history of Uruguayan league football. He scored a total of 268 goals throughout his football career.
- He holds the Uruguayan domestic record for the most goals scored in a game, with 7 goals against Huracán Buceo, it could have been 8 but he missed a penalty in the final minutes of the game.
- He is the highest goalscorer in a Uruguayan Primera league season with 36 goals in 1978.
- Three times top scorer in the Copa Libertadores (1974, 1975 and 1982).
- Highest scoring Uruguayan player in the history of the Copa Libertadores with 37 goals in 77 games.
