= Wladimir (footballer) =

Brazilian footballer

Personal information
- Full name: Wladimir Rodrigues dos Santos
- Date of birth: 29 August 1954 (age 72)
- Place of birth: São Paulo, Brazil
- Height: 1.69 m (5 ft 7 in)
- Position: Left-back

Senior career*
Years	Team	Apps	(Gls)
1972–1985	Corinthians	805	(32)
1986	Santo André		
1987	Corinthians		
1988	Ponte Preta		
1989	Santos		
1990	Cruzeiro		
Total		805	(32)

International career
1977–1985	Brazil	7	(0)
- * Club domestic league appearances and goals

Wladimir Rodrigues dos Santos (born 29 August 1954), is a former Brazilian football who played as a left-back.

He won four São Paulo State Championships (in 1977, 1979, 1982 and 1983) and is the most capped player in Corinthians history with 803 matches played.

In 1998 Federação Paulista de Futebol named him in the Paulista League all-time best XI, alongside players like Rivellino, Ademir da Guia, Pelé, Djalma Santos and others.

He was also named, by Placar Magazine, as the best left-back in Corinthians' history.

== Career ==
- Corinthians: 1972–1985
- Santo André: 1986
- Corinthians: 1987
- Ponte Preta: 1988
- Santos: 1989
- Cruzeiro: 1990
- Central Brasileira de Cotia: 1991
- São Caetano

== Honours ==
Corinthians

- Campeonato Paulista: 1977, 1979, 1982, 1983

Individual

- Bola de Prata: 1974, 1976, 1982
