= Luís Pereira =

Brazilian footballer (born 1949)

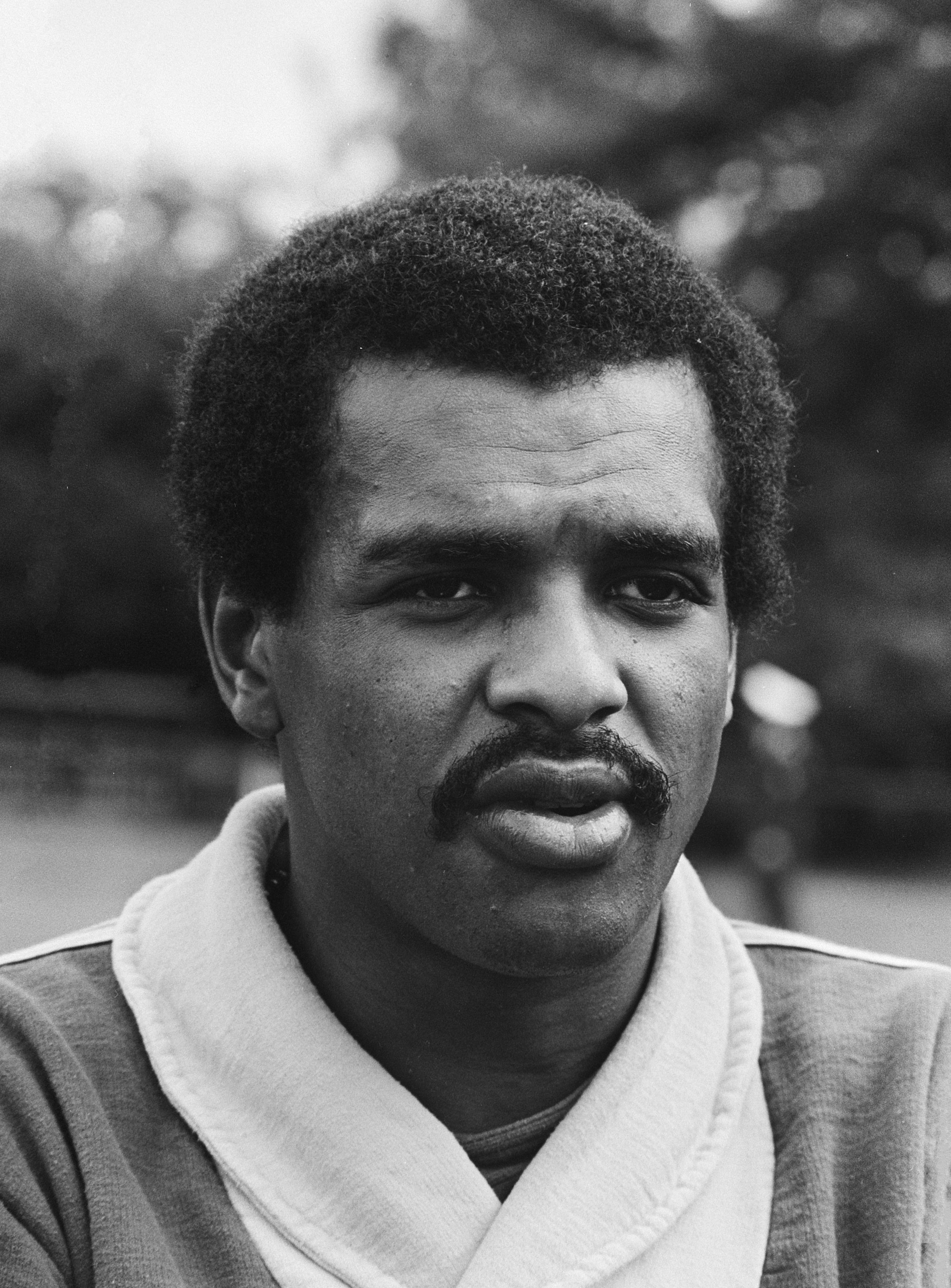
- Luís Pereira at the 1974 FIFA World Cup

Personal information
- Full name: Luís Edimundo Pereira
- Date of birth: 21 June 1949 (age 77)
- Place of birth: Juazeiro, Brazil
- Height: 1.85 m (6 ft 1 in)
- Position: Centre back

Senior career*
Years	Team	Apps	(Gls)
1967–1968	São Bento		
1968–1974	Palmeiras	93	(6)
1974–1980	Atlético Madrid	143	(14)
1980–1981	Flamengo		
1981–1984	Palmeiras	71	(4)
1985–1986	Portuguesa		
1986–1987	Corinthians	24	(0)
1988	Santo André		
1989	Central de Cotia		
1990–1992	São Caetano		
1993	São Bernardo		
1994	São Bento		

International career
1973–1977	Brazil	32	(0)
- * Club domestic league appearances and goals

Luís Edmundo Pereira (born 21 June 1949) is a Brazilian former professional footballer who played as a centre back, in particular with Palmeiras, Atlético Madrid and the Brazil national team. He won national championships in both Brazil and Spain beyond UEFA and the Intercontinental Cup. Known for his pace and power, as well as his marking and defensive leadership, he was, for a time, considered one of the best defenders in Europe during his time with Atlético Madrid. While his defending style can be considered "classical," he is also considered the first and best of Brazil's "modern" centre back, a role that would go on to include World Cup winner Lúcio.

== Career ==
Pereira received 36 caps with the Brazil national team, the first one in June 1973 and the last in July 1977, and played in the 1974 World Cup – where he was sent off in the second round match against Holland for a foul on Johan Neeskens. He became the first Brazilian player to receive a red card during a World Cup finals match.

Pereira played 562 games with Palmeiras (34 goals) and 171 games with Atlético Madrid (17 goals).

After retiring as player, he continued his involvement in football by becoming manager of São Bento and Sãocarlense, and assistant manager of São Caetano.

Since 2002 he lives in Madrid, Spain, with his wife and daughter and he is the President of the Atlético Madrid B.

== Honours ==
Palmeiras

- Campeonato Paulista: 1972, 1974
- Campeonato Brasileiro Série A: 1969, 1972, 1973

Atlético de Madrid

- La Liga: 1976–77
- Copa del Rey: 1975–76

Individual

- World XI: 1974, 1977, 1978
- La Liga Team of The Year: 1977
- IFFHS Brazilian Best Footballer of XX Century: 15º
