= Edu (footballer, born 1949) =

Brazilian footballer

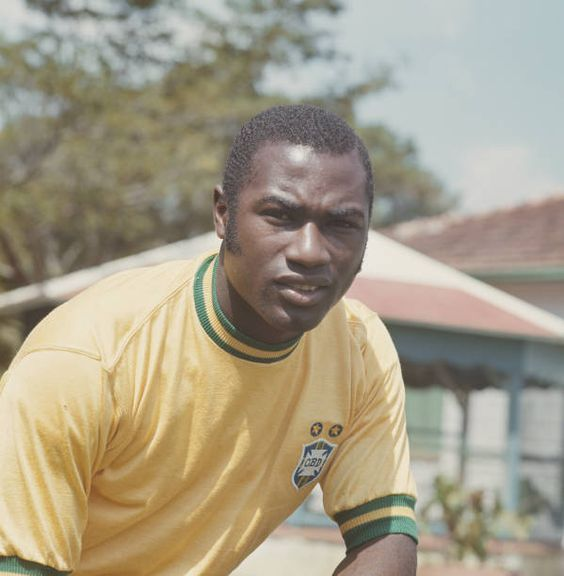
- Edu in 1970

Personal information
- Full name: Jonas Eduardo Américo
- Date of birth: 6 August 1949 (age 77)
- Place of birth: Jaú, Brazil
- Position: Forward

Youth career
- 1964–1966: Santos

Senior career*
Years	Team	Apps	(Gls)
1966–1976	Santos	584	(183)
1976	Corinthians	40	(5)
1977	Internacional	9	(2)
1977–1983	Tigres UANL	59	(3)
1983	São Cristovão	0	(0)
1984–1985	Nacional-AM	26	(5)
1985	Dom Bosco		
Total		718	(198)

International career
1966–1976	Brazil	42	(8)
Medal record
Men's Football
Representing Brazil
FIFA World Cup
Winner	1970 Mexico
- * Club domestic league appearances and goals

Jonas Eduardo Américo, called Edu, (born 6 August 1949) is a Brazilian former footballer who played as a forward.

Edu was born in Jaú, São Paulo. From 1966 to 1985 he played for Santos, Corinthians, Internacional, Tigres UANL (in Mexico), São Cristovão and Nacional-AM. He won five Campeonato Paulista titles (1967, 1968, 1969, 1973, 1977) and received the Brazilian Silver Ball Award in 1971.

With the Brazilian team he played in 42 matches, from June 1966 to June 1976, and scored eight goals. He was a 1970 World Champion, and was also selected for Brazil at the 1966 and the 1974 FIFA World Cup. He played once in 1970 and once in 1974. He was also called up for the 1966 FIFA World Cup, at 16 years and 339 days of age at the start of the tournament, being the youngest player to ever be called up for the tournament; however, he did not play in any match.

More recently Edu played in an all-stars masters team in touring exhibition matches.

== Honours ==
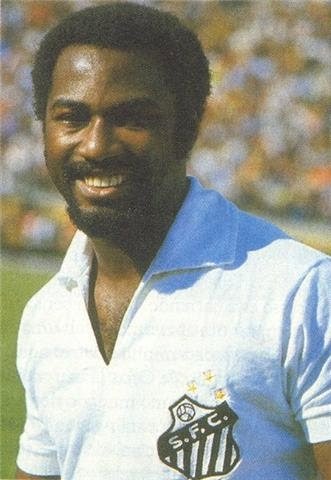
Edu with Santos in 1971

Santos

- Torneio Rio–São Paulo: 1966
- Campeonato Paulista: 1967, 1968, 1969, 1973
- Campeonato Brasileiro: 1968
- Intercontinental Champions' Supercup: 1968

Corinthans

- Campeonato Paulista: 1977

Brazil

- FIFA World Cup: 1970
