= Colegio Juan XXIII =

Location
- Avenida Primera No. 14, Urbanización San Isidro; Maracay, Aragua, 2101; Venezuela; 10.25521°N 67.59494°W

Information
- Established: 1963; 63 years ago
- Language: Spanish and Italian
- Website: colegiojuanxxiii.jesistemas.com

Colegio Juan XXIII (originally called "Scuola Giovanni XXIII") is an Italian private & religious school in Maracay (Venezuela).

== History ==
The Colegio Italo venezolano "Juan XXIII" was created in the early 1960s to meet the educational and catholic needs of the Italian community in Maracay. The initial courses of the Scuola Giovanni ventitre (as was called) were in Italian language with some Spanish lessons, but after a few years all the courses were bilingual in Spanish and Italian.

What was created as a school for the sons and daughters of the Italian immigrants in Venezuela, now it is a place for all Maracay's students without distinction of nationality or race....Ivonne Álvarez, actual manager of the school Juan XXIII, remembers that the institution was created 52 years ago (in 1963) and now has 614 students...Daniela Cesarini

In the late 1990s were added the first years of "Bachillerato" (High school), that was done mainly in Spanish but with some Italian lessons. Actually the "Colegio Juan XXIII" (as is usually called) has nearly 700 students and all the courses are only in Spanish language. Italian is done as a foreign language mandatory in high school ("Bachillerato venezolano").

Students of this prestigious Maracay "Colegio" often participate in meetings and celebrations promoted by the Italian embassy and the Dante Alighieri association

== Bibliography ==
- Cassani Pironti, Fabio. Gli italiani in Venezuela dall’Indipendenza al Secondo Dopoguerra. Roma, 2004

== See also ==
- Colegio Agustín Codazzi
- Colegio Amerigo Vespucci
- Colegio De Marta
- Colegio Antonio Rosmini
- Colegio NS de Pompei
- Italo-Venezuelans
- Italian language in Venezuela
