= Colegio NS de Pompei =

Colegio Nuestra Señora de Pompei

Location
- Avenida San Miguel, Urbanización Alta Florida; Caracas, 1050; Venezuela; 10.50942°N 66.86994°W

Information
- Established: 1962; 64 years ago
- Language: Spanish and Italian
- Website: colegiopompei.com.ve

Colegio NS de Pompei (originally called "Scuola Nostra Signora di Pompei") is an Italian private and religious school in Caracas (Venezuela).

== History ==
The Colegio Italo venezolano "Nuestra Señora de Pompei" was created in the early 1960s by the catholic fathers Scalabriniani to meet the educational and catholic needs of the Italian community in eastern Caracas. The initial courses of the Scuola Elementare Pompei (as was called, because it had only primary courses for 47 Italian kids) were in Italian language with some Spanish lessons, but after a few years all the courses were bilingual in Spanish and Italian.

In 1962 the Our Lady of Pompei School is founded by his first rector, Father Ettore Rubin...This small school opened with only 47 Italian children who attended preschool and elementary school from first through 3rd grade...In just one year the Pompei family grew rapidly and space became insufficient to meet all primary students. Therefore, the College temporarily changed its headquarters to a villa in Los Jabillos, but soon the (Scalabriniani) priests acquired a beautiful mansion in the Alta Florida, which became the permanent seat of the College and the center of meeting of the faithful pilgrims from the Italian Catholic Mission, with the construction of the Pompei Church. Since 1966 until today, school and church work in the same place....By 1970, the College already offered all levels, from kindergarten to 5th year. Padri Scalabriniani

The school was enlarged when was built the Pompei Church in the Alta Florida neighbourhood.

In the late 1970s it was added the "Bachillerato" (Mid-High school), that was done mainly in Spanish but with some Italian lessons. Actually the "Colegio Pompei" (as is usually called) has nearly 1000 students and all the courses are only in Spanish language.

Since 2001 Italian is done as a foreign language mandatory in kinder to mid-high school ("Bachillerato venezolano") in the so-called Programa de estudio de la lengua Italiana of the Venezuela government. Lately are celebrated some "Festivals" in the High School

== Bibliography ==
- Cassani Pironti, Fabio. Gli italiani in Venezuela dall’Indipendenza al Secondo Dopoguerra. Roma, 2004
- Scalabriniani official site:

== See also ==
- Colegio Agustín Codazzi
- Colegio Amerigo Vespucci
- Colegio De Marta
- Colegio Antonio Rosmini
- Italo-Venezuelans
- Italian language in Venezuela
- Scalabriniani
