= Colegio Antonio Rosmini =

Location
- Calle 25, between Avenida 8B and 10E, Los Pescadores, Santa Rosa de Tierra; Maracaibo, Zulia, 4001; Venezuela; 10.71871°N 71.60940°W

Information
- Established: 1960; 66 years ago
- Language: Spanish and Italian

Colegio Antonio Rosmini is an Italian private & religious school in Maracaibo (Venezuela), created in the 1960s by the Rosminians.

== History ==
The Colegio Italo venezolano "Antonio Rosmini" was created in 1960 in the urbanization "Los Cerros de Marin", Maracaibo, by the catholic missionary fathers Rosminiani Giambattista Zantedeschi, Josito Gattoni and James Connolly. They started it while associated with the Italian private school "Garibaldi", but in 1966 they created in a huge area of 70,000 square meters the actual big "campus" of the Colegio Rosmini.

Initially the school was opened with only a group of nearly one hundred Italian students, distributed between preschool and basic education from first through fifth grade (the courses were mainly in Italian language, but with some Spanish courses). In 1965 the Colegio Italo – Venezolano Antonio Rosmini of Maracaibo (estado Zulia) had 1300 students and it was the main school for the 87000 Italians residents in the Zulia area. Until the 1980s the "Rosmini" (as was called) was considered one of the Italian schools in Venezuela.

Actually the Unidad Educativa "Colegio Rosmini" has nearly 3000 students (including evening students) and the courses are only in Spanish language; however Italian is done as a foreign language, mandatory in High School ("Bachillerato venezolano").

Actually the College Rosmini is believed to be one of the best educational schools in Maracaibo. It has large areas: huge class-rooms in big modern buildings, lab sections, great library, futbol fields, covered sport utilities, large parking lots, nice church dedicated to S. Francis of Asis, a bell tower similar to the one of S. Mark in Venice that is famous for tourism, etc...(Hoy en día el Colegio Antonio Rosmini, es considerado como uno de los mejores centros educativos de Maracaibo. Goza de grades espacios: canchas cubiertas, campos de fútbol, grande estacionamiento, espaciosas aulas de clases, laboratorios, biblioteca, salas audiovisiales entre primaria y secundaria, elegante Iglesia dedicada a San Frasisco[sic] de Asis, una torre campanaria que resale como punto de referencia para los viajadores). Padres Rosminianos

In 1995 the Colegio Rosmini was enriched with a church dedicated to Saint Francis of Assisi, the saint patron of Italy. The Italian community in Maracaibo made possible the construction of the temple in honor of St. Francis of Assisi. On the altar, San Francisco is depicted in a painting by Italian artist Giovanni Vitti. Soon in Italy arose the view that the sanctuary of Maracaibo deserved a worthy bell tower of the great devotion to the venerable saint born in Gubbio: so, because of large donations from Italians, Maracaibo has a bell tower, that is a unique replica of the existing tower in St. Mark's Square in Venice. In addition to its majesty, it has eight bells made by hand in Anagni, capable of reproducing musical notes to offer a true concert of bells, in order to remember the message of Christ to neighbors and parishioners.

All the students of the Colegio Rosmini celebrate often in the area under the church and the belfry.

== See also ==
- Colegio Agustín Codazzi
- Colegio Amerigo Vespucci
- Colegio De Marta
- Italo-Venezuelans
- Italian language in Venezuela
- Rosminians

== Bibliography ==
- Cassani Pironti, Fabio. Gli italiani in Venezuela dall’Indipendenza al Secondo Dopoguerra. Roma, 2004
- Rosminians Official Site
- Herbermann, Charles, ed. (1913). "Rosminians". Catholic Encyclopedia. New York: Robert Appleton Company.
