= Italian Venezuelans =

Venezuelan citizens of Italian descent

Italo-venezuelani (Italian) Ítalo-venezolanos (Spanish)
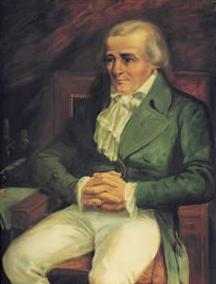
- Juan Germán Roscio was a Venezuelan lawyer and politician of Italian ancestry who was the main editor of the Venezuelan Declaration of Independence, and the chief architect of the Venezuelan Constitution of 1811

Total population
- c. 30,000 (by birth); 2,000,000 (Italian Embassy, 2017). 5,000,000 (Il Gazzettino, 2020)

Regions with significant populations
- Greater Caracas, Valencia, Maracay, Barquisimeto, Maracaibo, Barcelona-Puerto La Cruz, Margarita Island, Ciudad Guayana, Acarigua-Araure and Mérida

Languages
- Venezuelan Spanish · Italian and Italian dialects

Religion
- Roman Catholic

Related ethnic groups
- Italians, Italian Americans, Italian Argentines, Italian Bolivians, Italian Brazilians, Italian Canadians, Italian Chileans, Italian Colombian, Italian Costa Ricans, Italian Cubans, Italian Dominicans, Italian Ecuadorians, Italian Guatemalans, Italian Haitians, Italian Hondurans, Italian Mexicans, Italian Panamanians, Italian Paraguayans, Italian Peruvians, Italian Puerto Ricans, Italian Salvadorans, Italian Uruguayans

Italian Venezuelans (Italian: italo-venezuelani; Spanish: ítalo-venezolanos) are Venezuelan-born citizens who are fully or partially of Italian descent, whose ancestors were Italians who emigrated to Venezuela during the Italian diaspora, or Italian-born people in Venezuela. Italians were among the largest groups of European immigrants to settle in the country. According to one estimate, there are 5 million Venezuelans with some degree of Italian or Venetian ancestry, corresponding to about 16% of the population, while there were around 30,000 Italian citizens in Venezuela.

Italians began arriving in Venezuela in massive numbers in the last half of the nineteenth and the first half of the twentieth centuries. Yet Italians began to transmit their cultural heritage, giving and receiving demonstrations of social empathy, which contributed to their integration and to the huge flows into Venezuela in 1947 and in 1948.

The massive presence of travelers, explorers, missionaries, and other peninsular and insular Italian immigrants over the course of almost 500 years made Venezuela acquire a Latin vocation instead of a Hispanic one. Italians also influenced the Venezuelan accent, given its slight sing-songy intonation. Similarly, beyond the ethnic contribution, Italian culture has had a significant impact in Venezuela, a country which is the second in the world with the highest consumption of pasta per capita after Italy.

== History ==
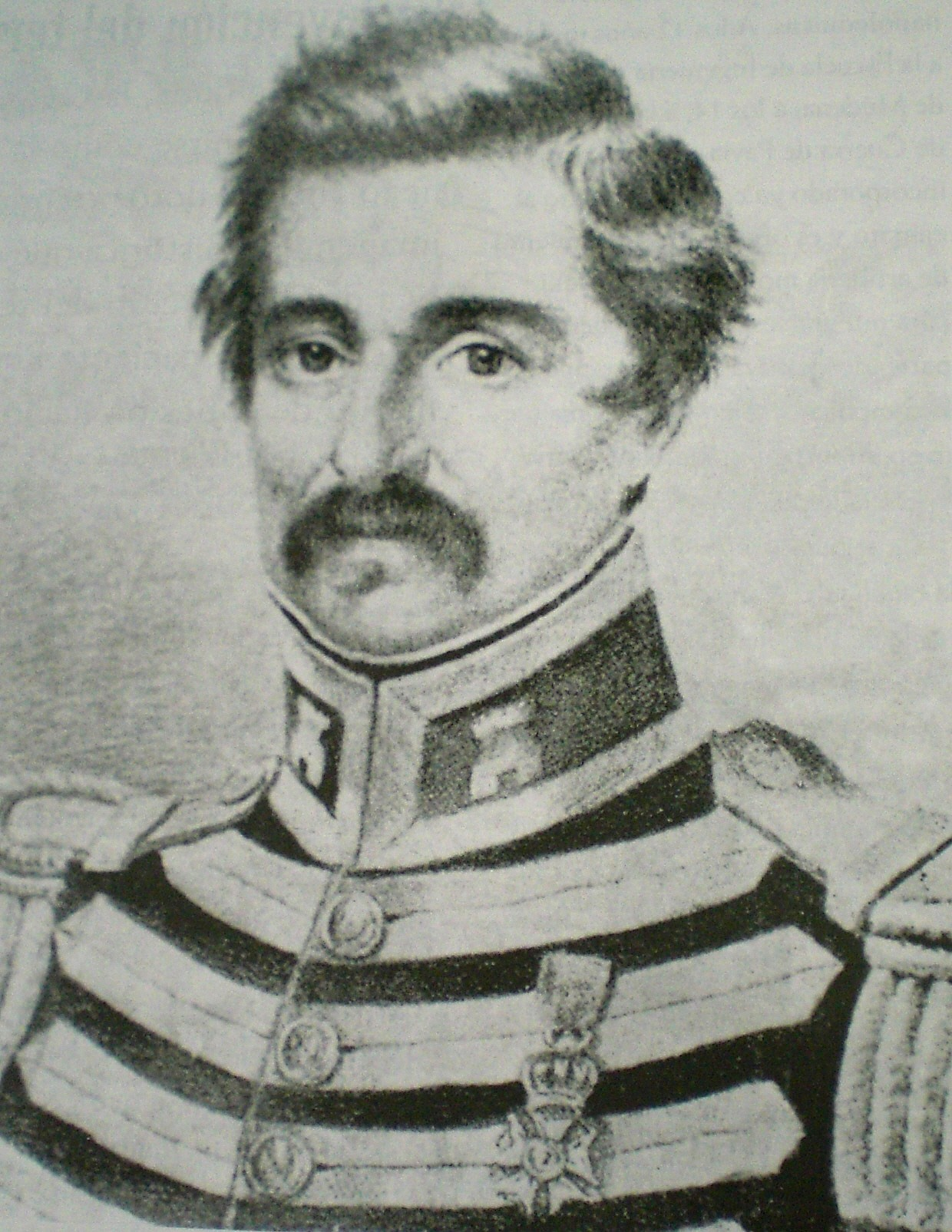
Agostino Codazzi

The presence of Italians in Venezuela dates back to the Genoese sailor Christopher Columbus who landed in Macuro in 1498, followed by the explorer Amerigo Vespucci (1499) and the conquistador Giacomo Castiglione (Hispanicized as "Santiago Castellón"), creator of the first settlement of Nueva Cadiz on the Island of Cubagua in 1510 (a town created for the exploitation of pearls).

Before the discovery of large deposits of oil in Venezuela, during the first half of the 20th century, the emigration of Italians to Venezuela was limited. In colonial times, only a few hundred Italians (such as Filippo Salvatore Gilii, Juan Germán Roscio, Francisco Isnardi) arrived in Venezuela with a slight increase during the war of independence, including the privateer Giovanni Bianchi, Colonel Agostino Codazzi, Constante Ferrari, Gaetano Cestari and General Carlos Luis Castelli. The jurist and deputy Juan Germán Roscio was the author of the first republican constitution of Hispanic America promulgated in Venezuela on 21 December 1811. Roscio is considered a forerunner in the defense of civil rights and in the fight against discrimination in Venezuela and throughout the Americas, for his defense of his mestizo mother (Paula María Nieves, native of La Victoria). In the Republican era of the 19th century there was a small number of Italians and their descendants who attained high status in Venezuelan society, such as the surgeon Luis Razetti. The 1891 Venezuelan census recorded 3,030 immigrants from the Kingdom of Italy, just over 6% of the total foreign population in Venezuela. At the beginning of the 20th century, several thousand Italians immigrated to Venezuela, obtaining good working conditions, even while the community remained relatively small.

By 1926 there were 3,009 Italians in Venezuela ... approximately one-third lived in the capital, one-sixth in Trujillo and there were respectable showings in Bolivar, Carabobo, and Monagas. Zulia, with its port of Maracaibo, had gained in importance. ... The "Societa' Fratellanza Italiana" was a mutual benefit society founded in Caracas in 1883. Other organizations of the small Italian community included the "Associazione Nazionale Combatenti", the "Lega Navale Italiana", the "Camera di Comercio Italiana in Venezuela", a section of the "Croce Rossa Italiana" and, founded in 1923, the "Partito Nazionale Fascista", with over two hundred members and organizations in four cities:Caracas, Valencia, Puerto Cabello and Barquisimeto (Duaca). ... Two Italian newspapers, "Eco de Italia", followed by "El Eco de la Patria", were published in the early 1920s. The first attempts to provide schooling in the Italian language date from the late 1930s, as do the beginnings of the first social club, "La Casa de Italia" (officially founded in 1937 with the patronage of the Italian minister). The Casa co-sponsored an Italian school, a cultural institute and several sports teams, notably in soccer and cycling.

— Susan Berglund

In the 1940s and 1950s, the dictatorship of the general Marcos Pérez Jiménez promoted European immigration to his depopulated country, and more than 300,000 Italians emigrated to Venezuela where they flourished under his administration because he had started many urban infrastructure projects due to the revenues of oil exportation. There were ample opportunities to work in construction developments, and as a result the economic stance increased within its cities, especially Caracas, Valencia, Barquisimeto and Maracaibo. Noteworthy is the presence of many Italians in 1952 in the creation of the agricultural colony of Turén, the most ambitious experience of this type ever carried out in a Caribbean country. The Electoral Law of 1957, which allotted to foreigners voting rights for the very first time, became a detrimental event for the Italian communities in Venezuela. The law was put into place by General Pérez Jiménez, to aid him in his reelection campaign. The loss of Perez Jimenez in the presidential referendum meant that his social programs would end, and a huge gap in leadership would follow.

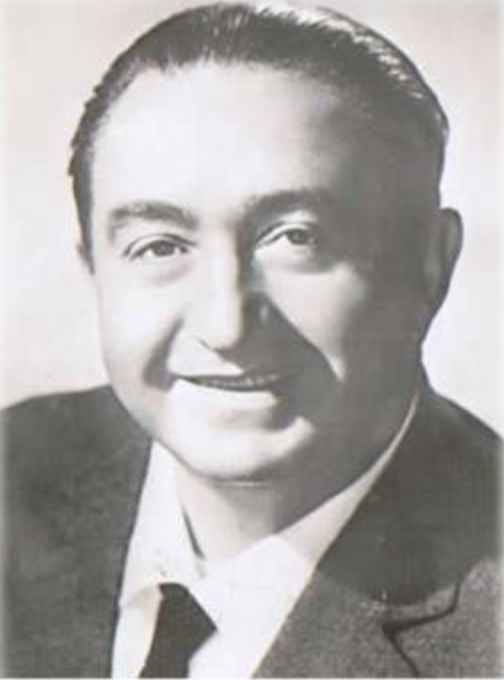
Filippo Gagliardi

Italian immigrants had notably supported the referendum of 2 December 1957 by President Perez Jimenez, as well as externalizing public support for the dictatorship in a demonstration attended by around 75,000 Italians led by the entrepreneur Filippo Gagliardi. When General Perez Jimenez fell from power on 23 January 1958, the hostile attitude of the provisional military government towards the removed president was also reflected on the groups who were supportive of him. For this reason, many migrants and their families chose to return to Italy through the following year, subsiding towards the end of February, when the Minister of Foreign Affairs recognized the potential damage of this shift and proceeded to guarantee security to the remaining Italians in Venezuela. This is a relevant factor, since acts of disdain towards the Italian populace undoubtedly affected the decisions of that ethnic group in regards to choosing to leave or enter the country.

The Italians in the 1961 Venezuelan census were the biggest European community in Venezuela (ahead of the Spanish).

In 1966, according to the Italian Embassy in Caracas, of the 170,000 Italians present in the country, 90% lived in the main cities. About 96,000 lived in Caracas, 14,000 in Maracaibo, 8,000 in Maracay, 6,000 in Valencia and 5,000 in La Guayra. Most of these Italians were born in Sicily, Campania and Puglia; only 15% were born in northern Italy (mainly in Emilia-Romagna). They initially worked in construction, in the service sector, in commercial agencies and in different businesses (like hotels, banks and restaurants), in manufacturing activities (the shoe industry in Caracas, for example, was fully in Italian hands) and a few also in the oil industry.

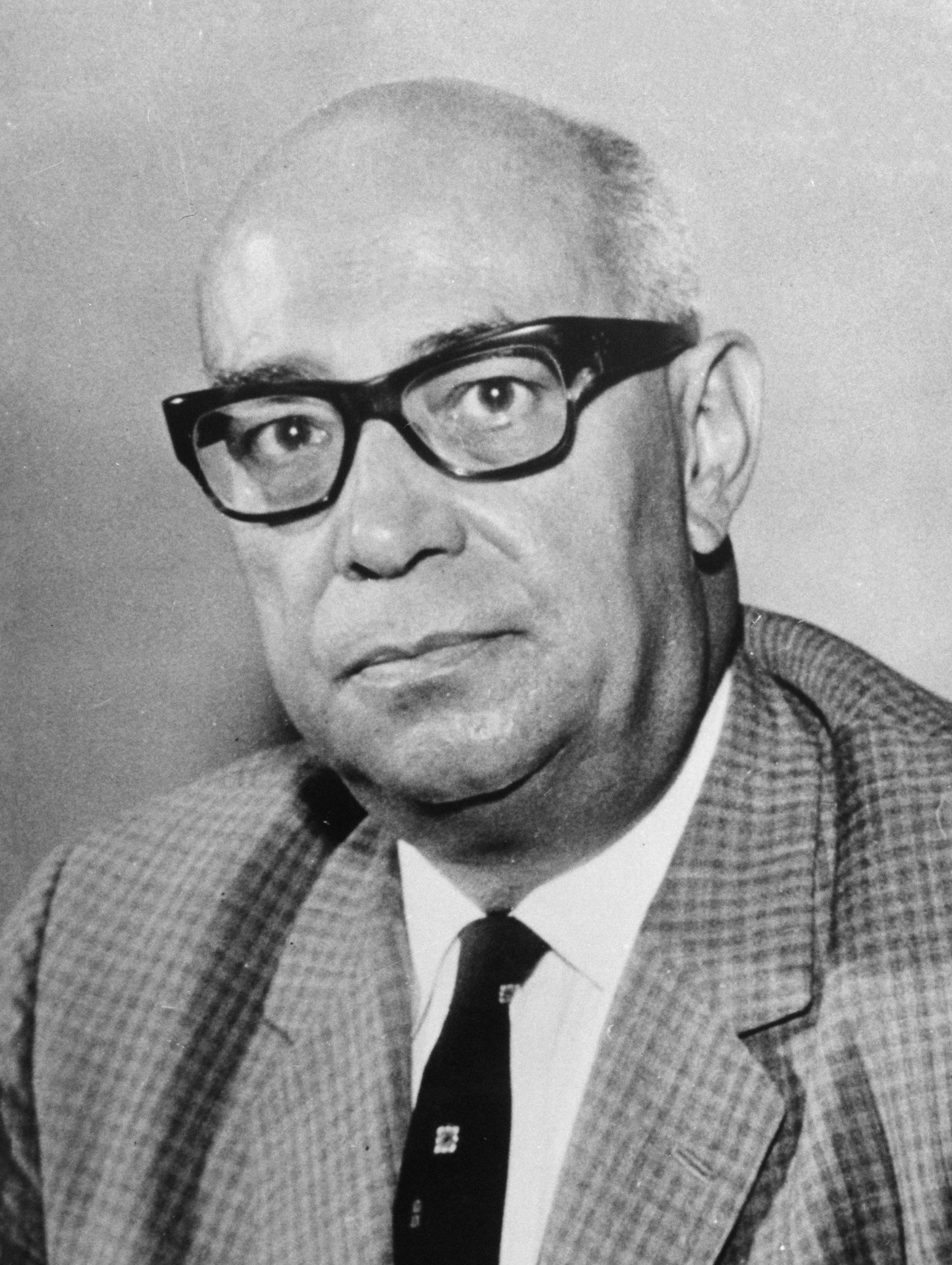
Raúl Leoni, of Italian descent, was president of Venezuela from 1964 until 1969

In 1976 the "Dirección de Estadísticas" of Venezuela registered 210,350 Italians residents and 25,858 Italians "naturalised" (who had obtained Venezuelan citizenship). In 2001, 126,553 Italians were living in Venezuela.

Marisa Vannini calculated that in the 1980s Italian-Venezuelans made up almost 400,000 of Venezuela's population, including second-generation descendants of immigrants. The Italian language in Venezuela is influencing Venezuelan Spanish with some modisms and loanwords and is experiencing a notable revival between the Italian-Venezuelans of second and third generation.

Santander Laya-Garrido estimated that the Venezuelans with at least one grandparent from Italy can be nearly one million at the beginning of the 21st century (like the former president of Venezuela, Raul Leoni, whose grandfather was an Italian mason refugee of the 19th century).

Currently, Italian citizens resident in Venezuela are reduced to less than 50,000 due mainly to demographic mortality and to their return to Italy (because of a Venezuelan political and economic crisis in the 2000s).

Italian population in Venezuela
Census year	Venezuelan population	Italian population	% of immigrants in Venezuela	% of Venezuelan population
1881	2,075,245	3,237	6.6	0.15
1941	3,850,771	3,034	6.3	0.07
1950	5,091,543	136,705	31.1	3.01
1961	7,523,999	113,631	24.6	1.51
1971	10,721,522	213,000	22.3	1.99
2001	23,054,210	49,337	4.86	0.21

== Italian community ==
Initially, agriculture was one of the main activities of the Italian community in Venezuela. In the 1950s, entire Italian families were moved from Italy to special agricultural areas, such as the "Colonia Turén" of the Portuguesa region.

However, most Italians concentrated in commercial, building and services activities during the second half of the 20th century. In those sectors, Italians reached top positions in the Venezuelan economy. Italian immigration has been a decisive factor for the modernization of production (industrial and agricultural) and commercial activities in the urban and rural areas of Venezuela, as well as for the improvement of living standards.

The community's main Italian newspapers are Il Corriere di Caracas and La Voce d'Italia , both published in the capital, and the main Italian school is the Agustin Codazzi of Caracas (with courses from elementary to high school). Since 2002, the Italian government has become the promoter for a provision which makes it mandatory to teach the Italian language as a second language in a consistent number of public and private schools within Venezuela.

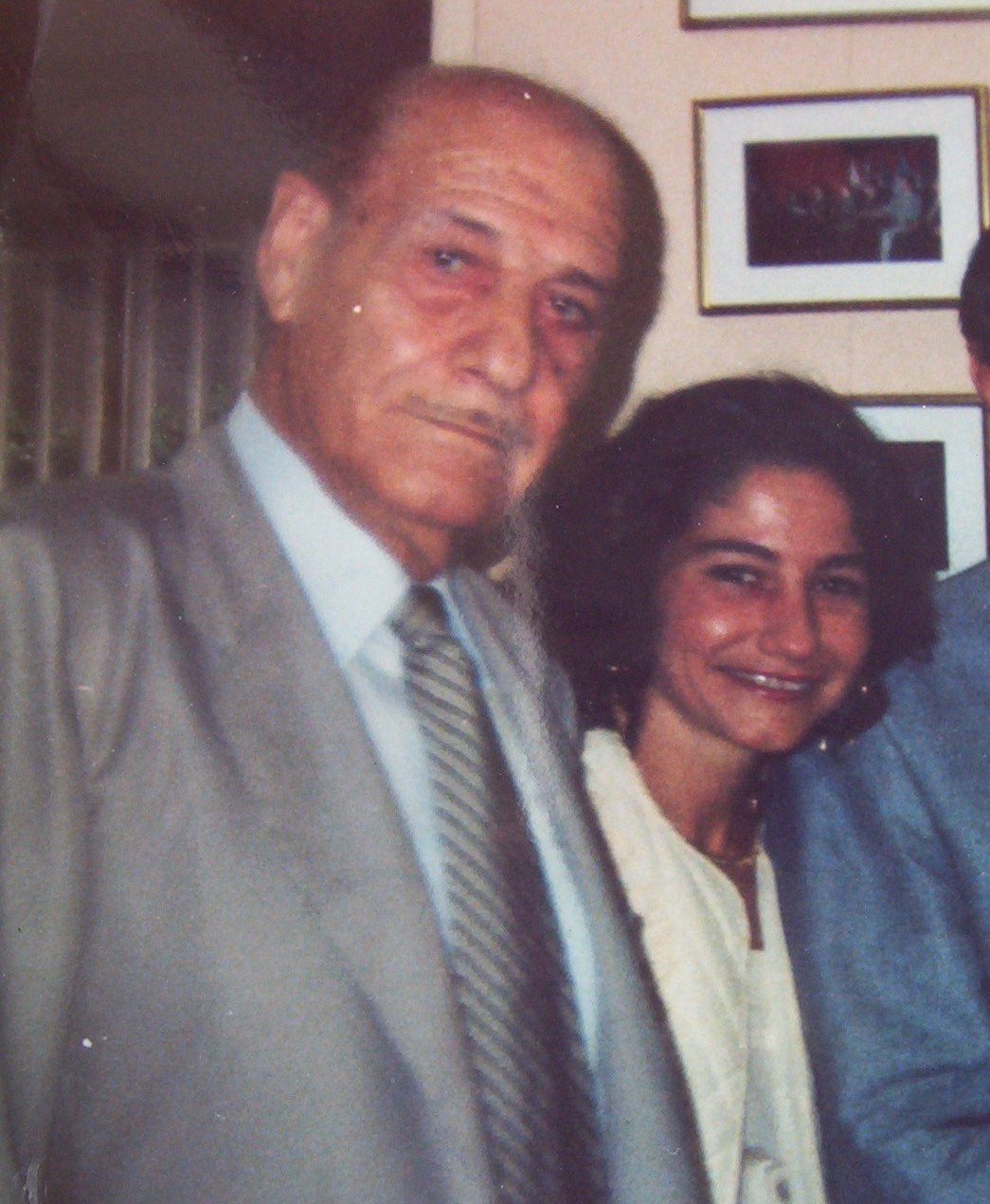
Pompeo D'Ambrosio, born in Italy, was responsible with his brother Mino for the golden age of Deportivo Italia, the Italian-Venezuelan football team

Most of the Italian community in Caracas, but even in the rest of Venezuela, followed Deportivo Italia football club, as its own representative team. Deportivo Italia achieved worldwide fame in the Pompeo D'Ambrosio era (it was considered the best Venezuelan team of the 20th century together with Estudiantes de Mérida F.C., according to the International Federation of Football History & Statistics) winning several national championships and participating in the Copa Libertadores in the 1960s and 1970s (getting the famous Little Maracanazo).

Indeed, Italian-Venezuelans have obtained significant results in the contemporary society of Venezuela. The Italian Embassy calculates that one-third of the Venezuelan industries, not related to the oil sector, are directly or indirectly owned and/or managed by Italian-Venezuelans. For example, one of the areas of Venezuelan society most influenced by Italians is gastronomy, with the related food industry. In fact, the consumption of pasta in Venezuela is second in the world only to that of Italy itself, and spaghetti is considered a fundamental dish of the Venezuelan diet (together with pizza).

Another sector of the Venezuelan economy favored by Italians is the footwear industry, especially in the metropolitan area of Caracas. Between the 1950s and 1970s Venezuela experienced a spontaneous boom in industrialization and many of the large production laboratories founded by immigrants became, over time, factories and large-scale distribution industries. Among these was the footwear sector, a business dominated by up to 70% Italian immigrants.

Most of the Italians who arrived after World War II are concentrated in the metropolitan areas of Caracas, Valencia and Maracay. In fact, currently the main community of Italian Venezuelans is that of Caracas, which includes the Church of Pompeii in Alta Florida, the Casa de Italia with Plaza Italia as its main points of congregation (especially in the second half of the 20th century) and now the Italian Venezuelan Center at Prados del Este.

In general, Italian Venezuelans include descendants of settlers who came from various regions of the Italian-speaking area of Europe. Therefore, the descendants of Italian Croatians and Italian Swiss are also counted. Included in the Italian minority are German Italians (Italian citizens of German descent and speak German language) and Arbëreshë people, the Italian-born descendants of Albanian settlers.

In the Italian community, actually one of the most important in Venezuela, there are Presidents of Venezuela (such as Jaime Lusinchi and Raúl Leoni), entrepreneurs (such as Delfino, who with his "Constructora Delpre" made in Caracas the tallest skyscrapers of South America (Parque Central Complex), managers (such as Pompeo D'Ambrosio), sportsmen (such as Johnny Cecotto), artists (such as Franco De Vita), beauty pageants (such as Daniela di Giacomo and Viviana Gibelli), and many others personalities.

One winner of the title Miss Venezuela was born in Italy; María Antonieta Cámpoli in 1972 and later she represented Venezuela in the Miss Universe, where she was the runner-up.

== Main Italo-Venezuelan Institutions and Associations ==
[...] the extraordinary profusion of 115 global and regional Italian-Venezuelan institutions (was) registered in 1990. They include 62 associations, clubs and similar entities; 17 of them are located in Caracas and satellite cities, namely the Italian-Venezuelan Center ("Centro Italo-Venezuelano") and Italy House ("Casa d'Italia"). Another 45 general institutions are established in different cities throughout the country. They include Italy House in Maracay and Maracaibo, the Italian Venezuelan Social Center in Valencia and the Italian Venezuelan Club in Barquisimeto. There are 53 regional associations in the country, most of which group immigrants from southern Italy, particularly Campania, Puglia, Sicily and Abruzzi. There are also associations for people born in other Italian regions. Their role is controversial, as the descendants of some Italians have pointed out, because there is a certain localism countered by the preservation of regional traditions. Some institutions are very important, such as the Sicilia House; others are merely representative. As of the late 1980s, Caracas housed 26 regional organizations of special importance. There are 27 other associations throughout the country, including Barquisimeto, Maracay and Valencia. These organizations have grown in the past years, encouraged by such processes as the election of" Comitati degli ltaliani all' Estero" (Committees of Italians Abroad). The proliferation of Italian institutions defending Italian national and regional identity has permitted the creation of two large coordination centres, "Federazione delle Associazioni Italo-Venezuelane", which brings together global associations, and Comitato Permanente delle Associazioni Regionali Italo-Venezuelane, composed of regional associations.

— Pedro Grau, Universidad Central Venezuela,

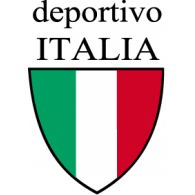
Coat of Arms of Deportivo Italia (the futbol team of the Italian community in Caracas), that won five Venezuela Championships and the famous Little Maracanazo.

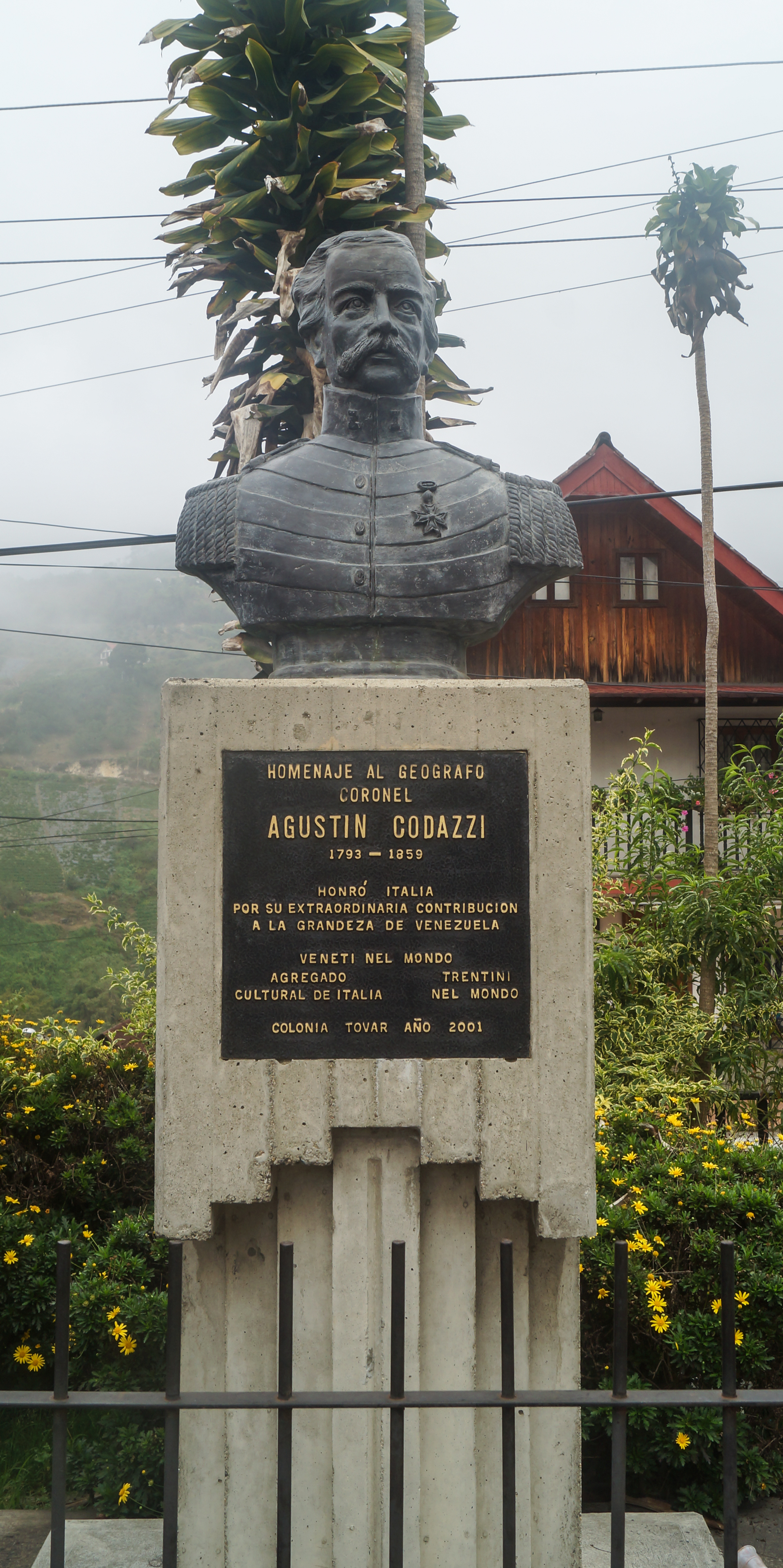
Monument erected in Colonia Tovar by the community of Venetian in the world in homage to its founder Agostino Codazzi with the inscription "Italy honored for its extraordinary contribution to the greatness of Venezuela"

The main Italian associations in Venezuela are the following:

- Asociación Region Liguria de Venezuela in Barquisimeto, Lara
- Associazione Campana di Lara in Barquisimeto, Lara
- Associazione Emilia Romagna in Barquisimeto, Lara
- Asociación Civil Agustin Codazzi in Caracas
- Asociación Civil Abruzzesi e Molisani nel Mondo in Caracas
- Asociación Cultural Menfitani in Caracas
- Associazione Calabrese in Caracas
- Associazione Civile Campani in Venezuela in Caracas
- Associazione Civile Regionale Basilicata en Venezuela in Caracas
- Associazione Civile Regionale Assolucana in Caracas
- Associazione Emiliano Romagnola in Caracas
- Associazione Nazionale Marchigiani del Venezuela in Caracas
- Associazione Toscani in Venezuela in Caracas
- Asociación Region Emilia Romagna de Venezuela in Maracaibo, Zulia
- Associazione Civile Campani dello Stato di Aragua in Maracay, Aragua
- Associazione Molisani di Aragua in Maracay, Aragua
- Associazione Campana Táchira in San Cristóbal, Táchira
- Associazione Civile Marchiglia dell'Occidente del Venezuela in San Cristóbal, Táchira
- Asociación Civil Abruzzesi e Molisani nel Mondo in Valencia, Carabobo
- Asociación Regional Siciliana di Carabobo in Valencia, Carabobo
- Associazione Regione Emilia Romagna di Carabobo in Valencia, Carabobo
- Associazione Campana Carabobo "Centro Social Italo-Venezolano" in Valencia, Carabobo
- Associazione Emilia Romagna in Valera, Trujillo
- Camera di Commercio, Industria ed Agricoltura Venezuelana-Italiana in Caracas
- Casa D'Italia in Caracas, Maracay, Valencia, Ciudad Bolívar
- Centro Italo-Venezolano in Caracas, Barcelona, Maracaibo, Valencia
- Circolo Trentino in Caracas
- Circolo Trevisani in Caracas
- Club Social Italiano in Puerto La Cruz, Acarigua, Calabozo
- Deportivo Italia Football Club
- Famiglia Bellunese in Caracas
- Federazione Delle Associazioni Campane del Venezuela in Caracas
- Genealogía Italiana en Venezuela
- Gruppo Folklorico Italo-Venezolano in Valencia, Carabobo
- Instituto Italiano de Cultura in Caracas
- Regional Associations of Italians in Venezuela

== Education ==
The Colegio Agustín Codazzi in Caracas is an overseas Italian school recognized by the Ministry of Foreign Affairs of Italy.

There are also multiple Italo-Venezuelan schools in the country:

Caracas:

- Colegio Agustín Codazzi
- Colegio San Francisco d'Assisi
- Colegio Nuestra Señora de Pompei
- Colegio Amerigo Vespucci
- Collegio San Marco Evangelista
- Collegio Patria
- Colegio Bolivar y Garibaldi

Eastern Venezuela:

- Collegio Maria Montessori in Ciudad Bolivar
- Collegio Angelo de Marta in Puerto La Cruz

Western Venezuela:

- Collegio R. C. Agazzi in Barquisimeto
- Collegio San Pedro in Barquisimeto
- Collegio Juan XXIII in Maracay
- Collegio Antonio Rosmini in Maracaibo
- Unidad Educativa Juan XXIII in Cabimas

== Geographical distribution and origin ==
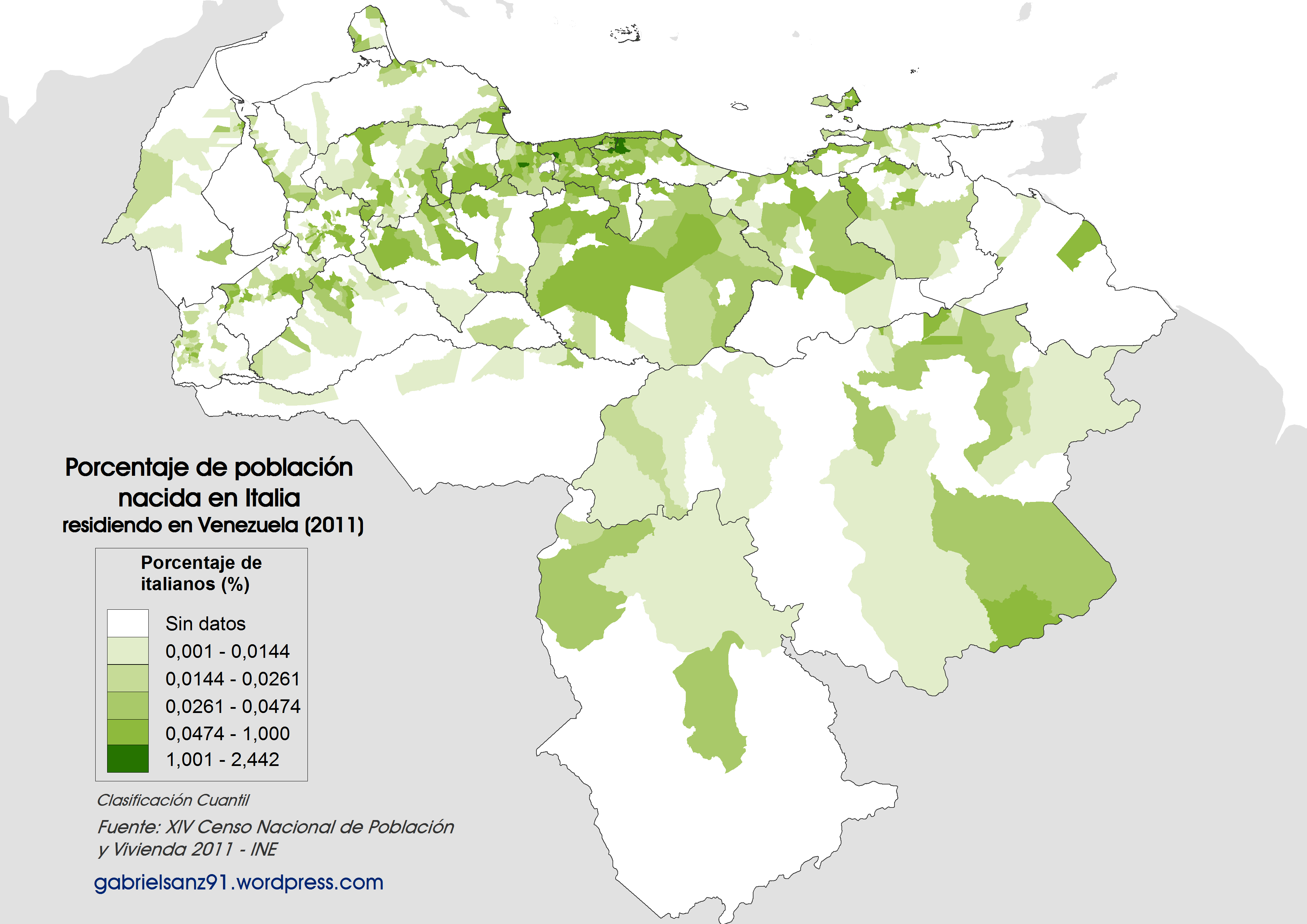
Percentage of population born in Italy through Venezuela

The Italians who migrated to Venezuela came mainly from the regions of South Italy, like Abruzzo, Campania, Sicily, and Apulia, but there were also migrants from the north, such as from Emilia-Romagna and Veneto.

The Italian Consulate in Caracas stated that in 1977, of 210,350 Italians residents in Venezuela, 39,855 were from Sicily, 35,802 from Campania, 20,808 from Abruzzi, 18,520 from Apulia, 8,953 from Veneto, 7,650 from Emilia-Romagna and 6,184 from Friuli-Venezia Giulia.

The Italians are concentrated mainly in the north-central region of Venezuela around Caracas. The Consulate stated that in the same 1977 there were 98,106 Italians in the Distrito Federal of Caracas, 39,508 in Miranda State, 14,203 in Maracaibo, 12.801 in Aragua State and 8,104 in Carabobo State, as well as 66 in the Amazonas equatorial region.

In the 2000s, it was determined that nearly 90% of the Italo-Venezuelans were concentrated in the northern coastal section of Venezuela facing the Caribbean Sea. Approximately 2/3 of them are residents of the metropolitan areas of the three main Venezuelan cities: Caracas, Maracaibo and Valencia.

There is also a considerable number of Italian residents that live in the city of San Cristóbal and in the Andes region.

== Demographics ==
=== Population ===
States with the highest proportions of Italian-born population tend to be those of the North-central coastal area (Capital and Central Region), the Andean Region (Mérida) and the Insular Region.

At the 2011 census, this was the breakdown of Italian-born population by state, showing that the capital area was the one with the biggest concentration of native Italians.

State	Italian-born Population	Percentage
Amazonas	19	0.013
Anzoátegui	1,116	0.0798
Apure	63	0.0137
Aragua	2,492	0.1537
Barinas	351	0.0434
Bolívar	885	0.0631
Capital District	5,792	0.3003
Carabobo	3,011	0.1349
Cojedes	93	0.0216
Delta Amacuro	18	0.01
Falcón	355	0.0373
Federal Dependencies	20	0.9438
Guárico	582	0.0785
Lara	1,449	0.082
Mérida	558	0.678
Miranda	8,263	0.3122
Monagas	494	0.0566
Nueva Esparta	915	0.1886
Portuguesa	851	0.0986
Sucre	296	0.038
Tachira	338	0.0291
Trujillo	349	0.051
Vargas	557	0.1591
Yaracuy	339	0.0566
Zulia	1,645	0.0446
Total Venezuela	30,901	0.1137

== Italian Influences ==
=== Language ===
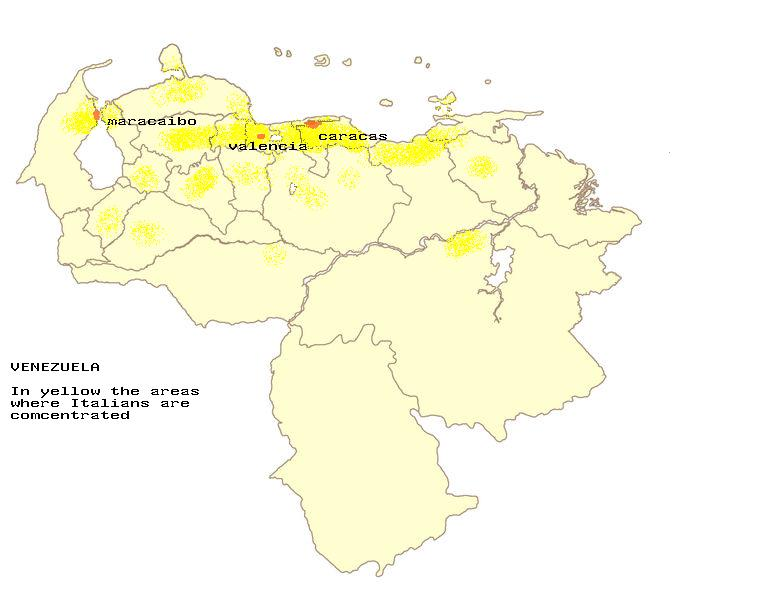
Areas (in yellow) where the Italian language is spoken in Venezuela by the Italian Venezuelan community

The Italian language in Venezuela has been present since colonial times in the areas around Caracas, Maracay, Valencia, Maracaibo and the Andes Mountains. The language is found in many idiomatic sentences and words of Venezuelan Spanish. There are around 200,000 Italian-speakers in the country, turning it in the second most spoken language in Venezuela, after Spanish. The name of Venezuela itself comes from the Italian Amerigo Vespucci, who called the area "Little Venice" in a typical Italian expression.

During the Venezuelan Wars of Independence some Italians helped Simón Bolivar against the Spanish Empire and they brought some Italian military words to Venezuelan Spanish. The military officer Agostino Codazzi created the first "Atlante" of Venezuela and - as a consequence - many geographical words in Venezuela are loanwords from Italian. In the second half of the 20th century, more than 300,000 Italians moved to Venezuela and left their linguistic imprint on the local vocabulary: "Ciao" is now a usual friendly salute in Caracas, for example. There are even expressions among local young people that mix Italian and Spanish words: "Muérete que chao" is an example.

Indeed after WWII came a huge emigration to Venezuela from Italy and the Italian language started to get importance in the country. The modisms of the upper class in Caracas (called "Sifrinos") are full of Italian words and expressions. Today, there are more than 5 million Venezuelans with some Italian roots: some young Italian Venezuelans in Caracas use slang mixing Italian dialect and Spanish among themselves. Italians also influenced Venezuelan accent, given its slight sing-songy intonation, like Rioplatense Spanish. Nearly all the Italians speaking the Italian language in Venezuela live in the half of the country north of the Orinoco-Apure rivers, while only a few thousands live in the Ciudad Bolivar-Ciudad Guayana and San Felipe areas of the Apure-Amazonas-Bolivar states.

Italian is also commonly spoken (mostly by the older generation) by residents of the town of La Carlota, a town in Venezuela which was one of the main settlements for Italians immigrants, regional languages of Italy were also brought to the country such as Neapolitan and Sicilian, Italian is the second language of many Venezuelans of Italian descent after Spanish, also the Italian government has become the promoter of a provision requiring the teaching of Italian as a second language in a constant number of public and private schools within Venezuela.

=== Cuisine ===
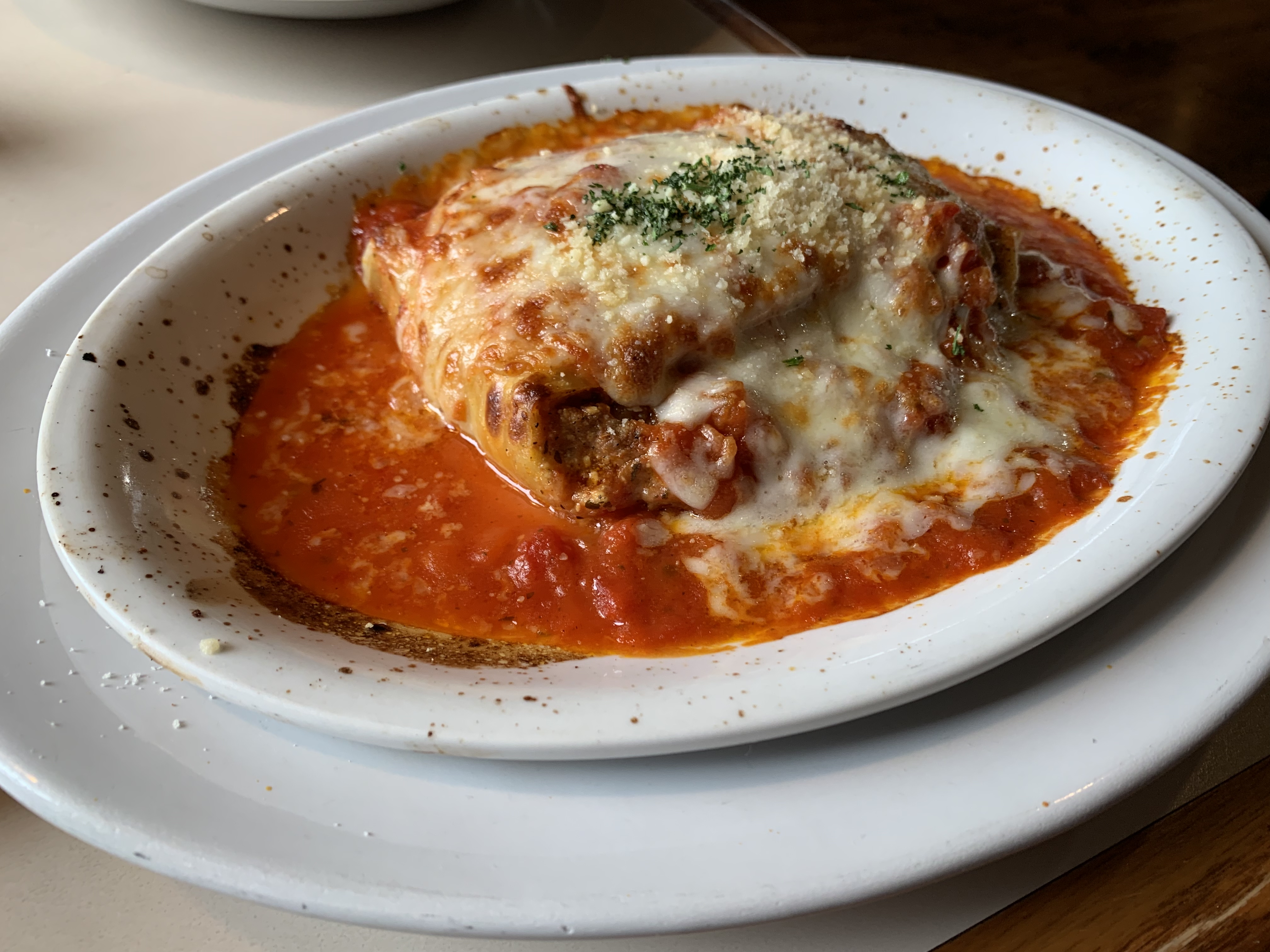
Lasagna with parmigiano cheese is one of the most common and national dishes of Venezuela.

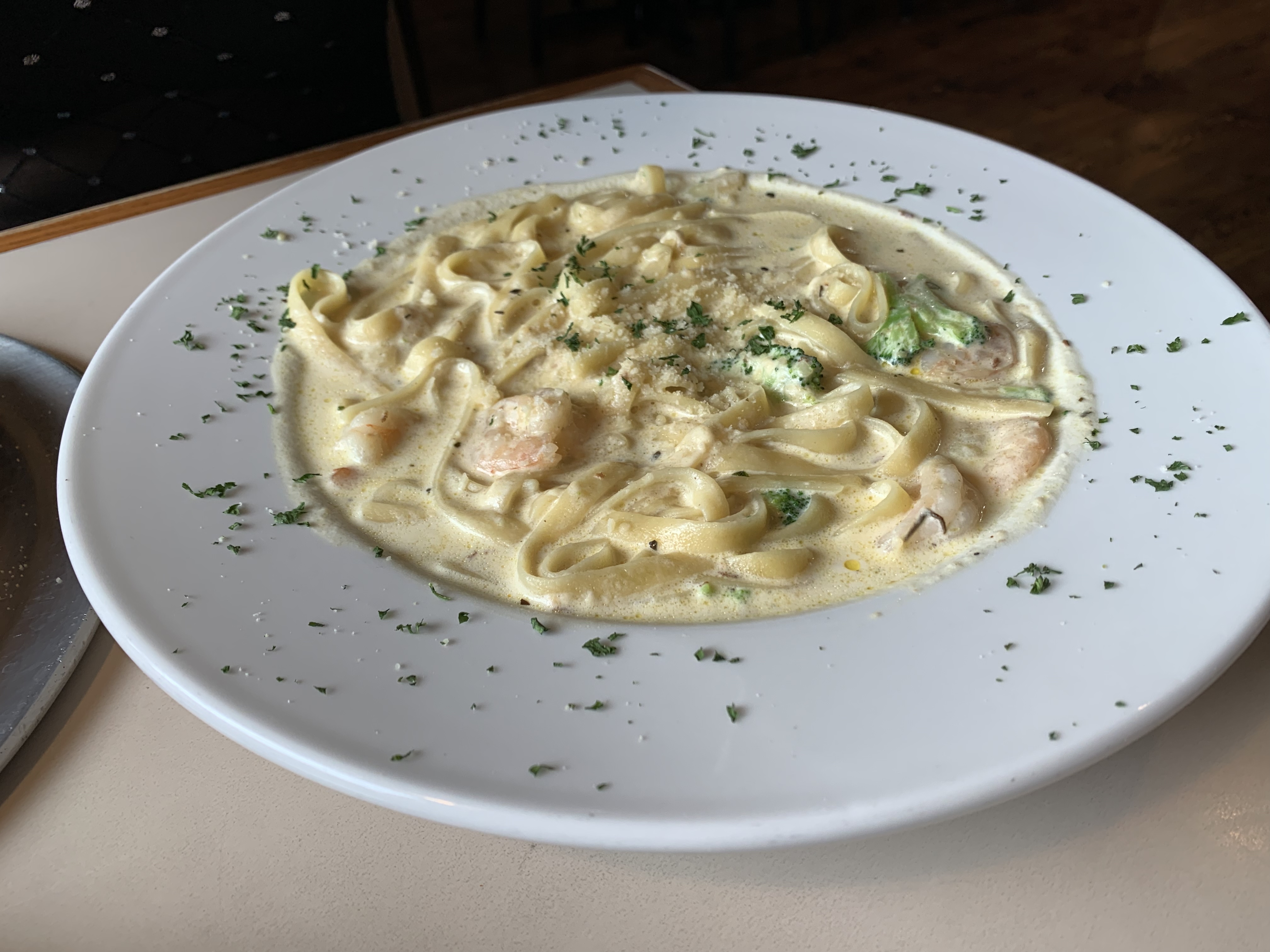
Venezuelan pasta.

Italian cuisine is one of the most influential in the country's every day in fact, Venezuela is the second country in the world with the most consumption of pasta only after Italy itself. Pasta is the third most consumed product in Venezuela, whose per capita consumption is 12.6 kg.

Pasticho (lasagna in Italian, pl. lasagne) is extremely common dish in Venezuelan cuisine, pasticho basically lasagne is one of the traditional Venezuelan dishes being popular as hallaca, it is consumed in the original form, but also received adaptations, the variants are innumerable, for example, in some, layers of ham are added or the pasta is replaced by banana or by cachapas leafs, a version which is known as chalupa, in others it has been completely modified which involve sauce of chicken or fish, and Pasticho de berenjena which resembles greek Moussaka.

Pizza is one of the most popular dishes in Venezuelan cuisine, pizza has had completely different contrast and variations. The Associazione Verace Pizza Napoletana has approved Portarossa, a Venezuelan business, for "La margarita," which comprises mozzarella cheese, and "La Marinada," which contains tomato sauce and garlic, as the eighth Latin American pizza certified as Pizza Napolitana by this establesiment, is an example of the various variants of pizzas in the country; it serves numerous types of pizzas, including "La Pizza Parrilla," which is made with chicken, pork, chorizo, and french fries, as well as Focaccia de Lomito carpaccio.

Polenta originated in Italy originally made from boiled cornmeal. Funche as it is better known in Venezuela, has been incorporated into stews. The typical dish is made with chicken. In the East and West of the country they additionally prepare it with sardines. The typical Polenta of Venezuela is a baked cake made from a mix of precooked corn (Harina P.A.N.), water and salt, stuffed with some meat, chicken, fish or pig stew.

Cannoli is a pastry tube filled with ricotta cheese and honey or chocolate. It is an extremely common dish in Venezuelan cuisine.

== Notable Italian-Venezuelans ==
=== Architecture ===
- Jorge Rigamonti – Designed multiple national and international award-winning buildings
- Vittorio Garatti
- Graziano Gasparini – Architect, architectural historian and painter
- Roberto Gottardi

=== Musicians ===
- Antonietta – Singer
- Daniela Avanzini – member of girl group Katseye
- Benito Canónico – Composer
- Mario Carniello – Composer, organist
- Daniel Calveti – Singer
- Gabriel Coronel – Singer
- Aldo Dona – Singer
- Rodolfo Saglimbeni – Conductor
- Nacho – Singer
- Antonio Lauro – Guitarist and composer
- Franco De Vita – Artist, singer, composer, songwriter and pianist
- Rosario Marciano – Pianist and writer
- Pablo Manavello – Composer, guitarist, singer and songwriter
- Arnoldo Nali – Composer and band leader
- Iván Pérez Rossi – Singer and musician
- Alejandra Ghersi – Musician commonly known as Arca (musician)
- Roberto Luti – Singer and record producer
- Corrado Galzio – Piano player and founder of cultural radio
- Primo Casale – Composer, conductor and violinist
- Franco Termini – Singer
- Lele Pons – Singer and internet personality
- Vito Ippolito – double bass player and singer
- Jorge Spiteri – Rock musician pioneer
- Rudy la Scala – Singer and record producer
- Evio di Marzo Migani – Songwriter and composer
- Roberto Ruscitti- Composer, pianist and accordionist
- Italo Pizzolante – Composer and musician
- Steffania Uttaro – Singer
- Yordano – Singer, songwriter, composer and musician

=== Actors and entertainers ===
- Gioia Arismendi – Actress
- Paula Bellini – TV entertainer
- Marisela Berti – Actress
- Annarella Bono – TV entertainer, actress and model
- Briggitte Bozzo – Actress
- Umberto Buonocuore - Actor
- Dayana Colmenares – Television personality
- Gabriel Coronel – Actor
- Antonio Delli – Actor
- Desideria D'Caro – Actress
- Chang D' Alessandro – Sport broadcaster and producer
- Luciano D'Alessandro – Actor
- Martino d'Avanzo – Chef host TV
- Wanda D'Isidoro – Actress
- Perla Farias – TV writer
- Sandro Finoglio – Actor
- Viviana Gibelli – Actress and producer
- Maria Grazia Bianchi – Actress
- Carlos Guillermo Haydon – Actor
- Jullye Giliberti – Actress
- Roberto Lamarca – Actor
- Fedra López Bernini – Actress
- Carla Baratta – Actress
- Anastasia Mazzone – Actress
- Dora Mazzone – Actress
- Carolina Motta – Actress, sexologist TV entertainer
- Alejandro Nones - Actor
- Fanny Otatti – TV entertainer
- Verónica Ortiz – Actress
- Sheyene Gerardi – Actress and producer
- Concetta Lo Dolce – Actress
- Renny Ottolina – Producer and TV entertainer
- Alba Roversi – Actress
- Gaetano Ruggiero de Vita- Actor
- Dante Carle – Actor
- Irma Palmieri – Actress
- Roberto Messuti – Actor
- John Petrizzelli - film director
- Humberto Tancredi – Actor
- Ángel David Revilla – Personality and writer
- Andrés Mistage – Actor
- Fernando Carrillo – Actor and singer
- Marisa Román – Actress
- Bella La Rosa – Actress
- Julie Restifo – Actress
- Dalila Colombo – Actress
- Marjorie Magri – Actress
- Claudia La Gatta – Actress
- Giancarlo Pasqualotto – Actor
- Laura Termini – Actress
- Gioia Lombardini – Actress
- Mónica Pasqualotto – Actress
- Paula Bevilacqua – Actress
- Ainett Stephens – Television personality
- Neyla Moronta – Actress and TV hostess
- Julie Restifo – Actress
- Luigi Sciamanna – Actor
- Enrique Sapene - Actor
- Doris Wells – Actress
- Gigi Zanchetta – Actress
- Rosanna Zanetti – Actress
- Patricia Zavala – TV presenter

=== Scientists ===
- Augusto Bonazzi - geochemist
- Nora Bustamante Luciani – Physician
- Leon Croizat – Biologist
- José Del Vecchio – Physician
- Francisco De Venanzi – Physician
- Antonio di Lisio – Environmental engineer
- Santos Dominici – Physician
- Olga Gasparini – Sociologist
- Giuseppe Giannetto - Chemist
- Otto Huber – Biologist
- Francisco Mago Leccia – Ichthyologist
- Mario Masciulli – Military engineer
- Ettore Mazzarri - Chemistt
- Alejandra Melfo – Physicist
- Carlos Alberto Moros Ghersi – Internist
- Domingo Luciani – Physician
- Luis Razetti – Physician
- Milena Sardi de Selle – Psychiatrist

=== Journalists ===
- Rafael Agostini – Journalist
- Marianela Balbi – Journalist
- Jesús María Bianco – Journalist, literary critic
- Nelson Bocaranda – Journalist
- Lindsay Casinelli
- Margarita D'Amico – Journalist
- Adriana D’Onghia – Journalist
- Roberto Giusti – Journalist
- Sergio Novelli – Journalist
- Jesús María Pellín
- Anna Vaccarella – Journalist
- José Nucete Sardi – Journalist
- Pascual Venegas Filardo – Journalist
- Carlos Henríquez Consalvi – Journalist
- José Visconti– Journalist

=== Economy ===
- Alberto Adriani – Economist
- Ernesto Armitano Amadei – Editor
- Jorge Botti – Entrepreneur
- Felipe Capozzolo – Entrepreneur
- Ángel Cervini– Entrepreneur
- Pompeo D'Ambrosio – Financial manager and vice-president of bank
- Giuseppe De Candido - Entrepreneur founder of Supmercados De Candido
- Eulogio del Pino - Engineer, CEO of PDVSA
- Héctor Ciavaldini- Engineer, CEO of PDVSA
- Roberto Mandini- Engineer, CEO of PDVSA
- Roberto Guarnieri – Economist
- Luis Giusti López - Engineer, CEO of PDVSA
- Filippo Gagliardi - Entrepreneur
- José Grasso Vecchio – Economist, CEO of Caracas Trade Exchange
- Jorge Giordani – Economist
- Gaetano Greco, industrialist cofounder of Venezuelan football team Deportivo Táchira F.C.
- Roberto Guarnieri – Economist
- Luigi Miglietti – Entrepreneur, racehorse owner
- Walter Pietrosemoli Rosa – Entrepreneur, co-founder of Costa Norte, S.A.
- Eddo Polesel – Entrepreneur
- Wilmer Ruperti – Entrepreneur
- Armando Scannone - Engineer, gourmet writer
- Rocco Sebastiani – Entrepreneur, racehorse owner
- Filippo Sindoni - Industrialist

=== Painters ===
- Juan Vicente Fabbiani – Painter
- Francisco Massiani – Writer and painter
- Emilio Boggio – Painter
- Emilio Jacinto Mauri – Painter
- Nedo Mion Ferrario – Painter
- Renzo Vestrini - Painter

=== Photographers ===
- Paolo Gasparini
- Elia Marcelli
- Mario Migliorini
- Franco Rubartelli
- Ermanno Stradelli

=== Religious ===
- Javier Bertucci- Evangelical pastor
- Filippo Salvatore Gilii – Italian Jesuit priest and linguist who lived in the Province of Venezuela before the War of Independence
- Enzo Ceccarelli – Salesian priest, Vicar Apostolic Emeritus of Puerto Ayacucho, Venezuela
- Giovanni Battista Zantesdechi - cofounder of Colegio Rosmini of Maracaibo

=== Politicians ===
- Ezio Angellini – Politician, Deputy, President of “Voluntariado Unidos por el Zulia”
- Marisa Bafile – Journalist, first deputy elected in 2006 at the Italian Parliament representing the Italians of Latin America
- Miguel Angel Burelli – Politician, ambassador
- Agostino Codazzi – Geographer, cartographer, military officer and governor of Barinas State
- Carlo Castelli – Italian military that fought with Simon Bolivar in the Venezuelan War of Independence
- Simón Alberto Consalvi – Politician
- Juan German Roscio – Lawyer, chief architect of the Venezuelan Constitution of 1811
- Miguel Cocchiola - Politician
- Américo De Grazia – Politician
- Rafael Lacava – Politician, governor of Carabobo State
- Jaime Lusinchi – President of Venezuela (1984–1989)
- Raul Leoni – President of Venezuela (1964–1969)
- Vicencio Scarano Spisso – Politician
- Biagio Pilieri – Politician
- Otto Hernández Pieretti – Politician
- Alberto Carnevali – Politician
- Francisco Isnardi – Politician
- Alberto Franceschi – Politician
- José Antonio Velutini – Politician
- Diego Alfredo Molero Bellavia – Politician

=== Sports ===
- Giovanni Carrara - Major League Baseball player
- Brayan Rocchio - Major League Baseball player
- Amleto Monacelli – Bowler
- Antonio Bellardi– Racehorse trainer
- Ettore Chimeri – Driver F1
- Vito Fassano– Footballer
- Roberto Cavallo– Footballer
- Daniel Canónico – Baseball player
- Miguel Mea Vitali – Footballer
- Rafael Mea Vitali – Footballer
- Francisco Limardo – épée fencer
- Johnny Cecotto – Moto driver
- Milka Duno – Motocar driver
- Jaime Moreno Ciorciari – Footballer
- Andrés Rouga – Footballer
- Jefferson Savarino - Footballer
- Sandro Notaroberto - Footballer
- Francisco La Mantía - Footballer
- Francisco Cervelli – Major League Baseball player
- Massimo Margiotta – Footballer
- Andres Galarraga – MLB player
- Marco Scutaro – MLB baseball player
- Fernando Aristeguieta di Luca - Footballer
- Gianfranco Di Julio – Soccer player
- Paola Ruggeri – Swimmer
- Jeriel De Santis - Footballer
- Augusto Nitti – Footballer
- Roberto Petagine – Major League Baseball player
- Gabriel Cichero – Football defender
- José Luis Dolgetta – Footballer
- Nahuel Ferraresi – Footballer
- Francisco Carabalí – Footballer
- Giancarlo Schiavone – Footballer
- Matías Lacava – Footballer
- Ángel Agnello – Footballer
- Ricardo Andreutti – Footballer
- Carlos Angelini – Footballer
- Gilberto Angelucci – Footballer
- Luis Annese – Footballer
- Diego Araguainamo – Footballer
- Samuel Barbieri – Footballer
- Héctor Bidoglio – Footballer
- Mauro Cichero – Footballer
- Alejandro Cichero – Footballer
- Vicente Suanno – Footballer
- Yaquino Celli – Footballer
- Franco Signorelli – Footballer
- Humberto Scovino – Footballer
- Iván Palazzese – Sportman (moto)
- John Cernicciaro – Footballer
- Diego García Veneri – Footballer
- Ricardo Mammarella – Footballer
- Jorge Casanova – Footballer
- Alexander Bottini – Footballer
- José Rafael Bottini – Footballer
- Daniel Saggiomo – Footballer
- Enzo Potolicchio – Racing driver
- María Elena Giusti – Swimmer
- Andrés Galarraga – Baseball player
- Enrico Forcella – Sport shooter
- Ernesto Torregrossa - Footballer
- Luis Cassiani - Footballer
- Jefre Vargas - Footballer
- Guillermo Vento – Baseball player
- Jimy Szymanski Ottaviano – Tennis player
- Daniel Canónico – Baseball right-handed pitcher
- Giovanni Savarese –Soccer player and trainer
- José Antonio Casanova – Baseball manager
- María Vento – Tennis player
- Juan Carlos Bianchi – Tennis player
- José Escalona – Baseball player

=== Beauty queens ===
- Daniela Di Giacomo – Miss International
- Michelle Bertolini – Miss International
- Marzia Piazza – Miss Venezuela 1969
- Diana Croce – Miss World Venezuela 2016
- Debora Menicucci – Miss World Venezuela
- Gabriella Ferrari – Miss World Venezuela
- Jeannette Donzella – Miss Venezuela 1971
- Monica Lei – Miss World Venezuela
- Fabiola Candosin – Miss World Venezuela
- Carolina Cerruti – Miss World Venezuela
- Patricia Tóffoli – Miss World Venezuela
- Olga Antonetti – Miss Venezuela 1962
- Bella La Rosa – Miss Venezuela 1970
- María Antonieta Cámpoli – Miss Venezuela 1972
- Desiree Rolando – Miss Venezuela 1973
- Paola Ruggeri – Miss Venezuela 1983
- Adriana Vasini – Miss world Venezuela
- Neyla Moronta – Miss Venezuela
- Mariam Habach – Miss Venezuela 2015
- Mariángela Bonanni - Miss Earth Venezuela 2010
- Valeria Vespoli - Miss Supranational Venezuela 2016
- Veruska Ramirez - Miss Universe Venezuela 1998

=== Writers ===
- Oriette D'Angelo
- Francisco Pimentel Agostini – Writer
- Tulio Chiossone – Writer
- Edoardo Crema – Writer
- Victoria de Stefano – Writer
- Vicente Gerbasi – Poet
- Rafael Di Prisco– Writer
- Bruno Luigi D'Ambrosio

== See also ==
- Italian diaspora
- Italian language in Venezuela
- Italy–Venezuela relations
- Corsican immigration to Venezuela
- Deportivo Italia (1948-2010)
- Deportivo Tachira

== Bibliography ==
- Cassani Pironti, Fabio. Gli italiani in Venezuela dall’Indipendenza al Secondo Dopoguerra. Roma, 2004
- Favero L. e Sacchetti G. Un secolo di emigrazione italiana: 1876–1976. Centro Studi Emigrazioni. Roma, 1978
- Mille, Nicola. Veinte Años de "MUSIUES". Editorial Sucre. Caracas, 1965
- Santander Laya-Garrido, Alfonso. Los Italianos forjadores de la nacionalidad y del desarrollo economico en Venezuela. Editorial Vadell. Valencia, 1978.
- Vannini, Marisa. Italia y los Italianos en la Historia y en la Cultura de Venezuela. Oficina Central de Información. Caracas, 1966
- Berglund, Susan. Las Inmigraciones a Venezuela en el siglo XX, Caracas, Venezuela: Edit. Fundación Mercantil Francisco Herrera, 2004.
- Cunill Grau, Pedro. Fronteras e inmigración en Venezuela 1830–1930. Italia Altre, 1991
