= Pompeo D'Ambrosio =

Italian-Venezuelan businessman

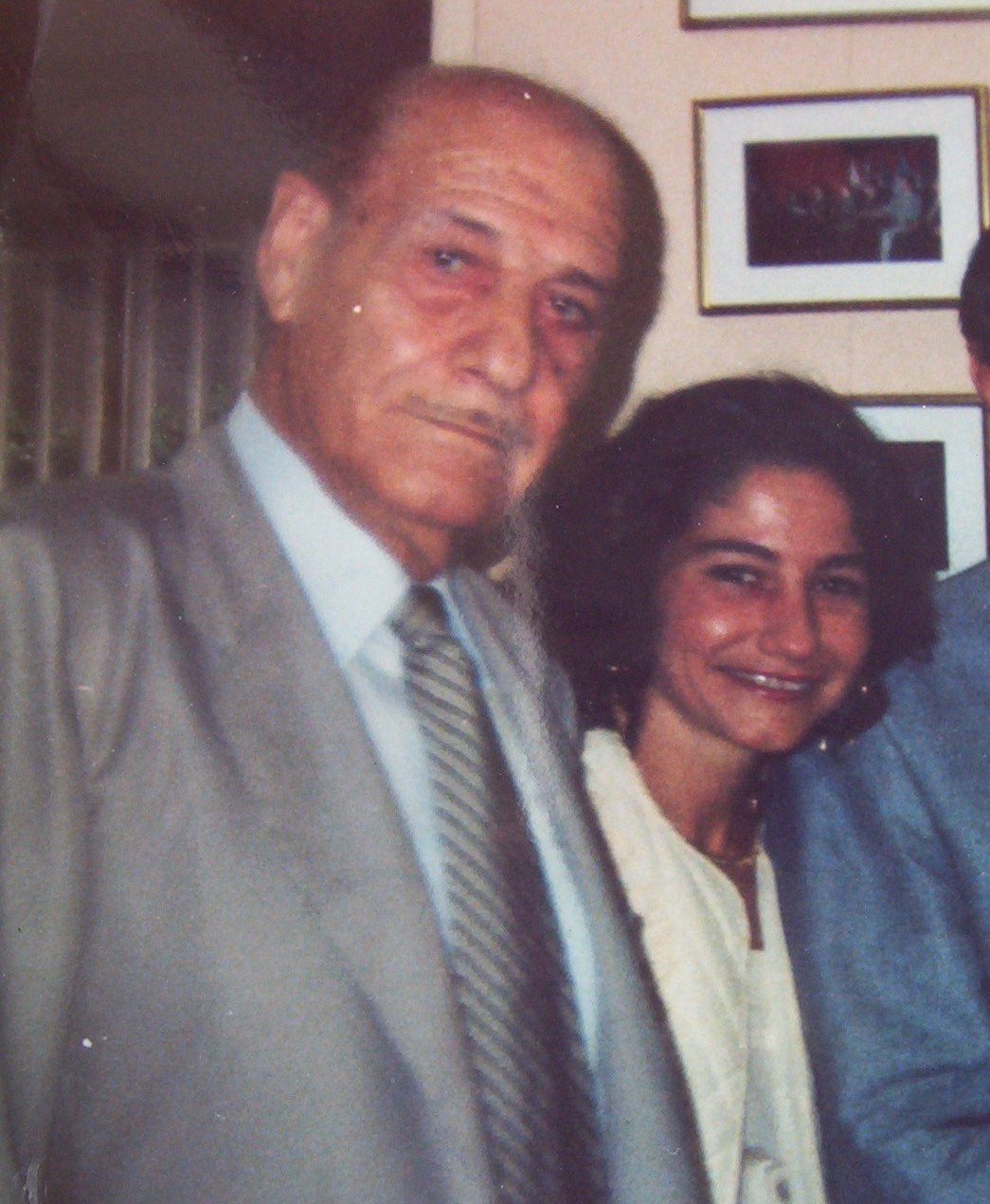
D'Ambrosio with his daughter Antonella, in a Banco Latino reunion

Pompeo D'Ambrosio (1 January 1917 – 15 April 1998) was an Italian-Venezuelan businessman.

He was renowned in the Italian community in Caracas and was very active—with his financial activity in one of the main Venezuelan banks, Banco Latino—in the promotion of many successful Italian entrepreneurs in Venezuela.

He was a financial manager for Deportivo Italia, the soccer club of the Italian community in Venezuela, during its peak in the 1960s and 1970s, when it was named "the best football team of Venezuela in the 20th century" by the International Federation of Football History & Statistics. Those years, when he ruled the team with his brother Mino, are remembered as the D'Ambrosio Era.

== Life ==
Pompeo D'Ambrosio was born on 1 January 1917 in Campagna. He lived his first years in Campagna, where his uncle was the Municipal Major who distinguished himself helping the Jews during the Nazi persecution of Jews.

In the mid-1930s, D'Ambrosio studied Administration of Italian Colonies at the University of Naples.

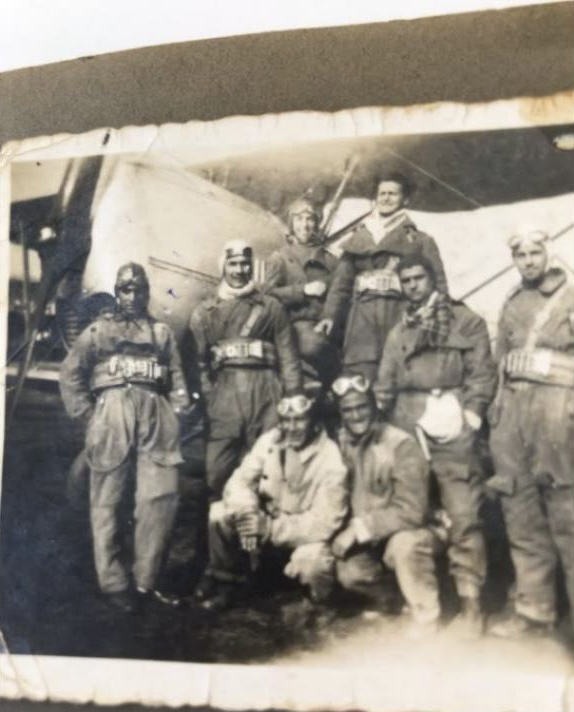
1938 photo showing D'Ambrosio as the second pilot standing to the left in his combat group

In the late 1930s he was a pilot in the Italian Air Force, but an accident forced him to be discharged from aerial service and so he became a lieutenant of the Italian Army in 1940:

Pompeo D'Ambrosio after the end of WW2 used to tell that he was lucky when he was discharged from the Air Force, after a dive exercise with his fighting airplane in early 1940 that left his ears bleeding (and so no more apt for pilot): he used to say that he would have died in aerial combat during WW2, like happened to all the other seven pilots of his air force group (see combat group's photo). The reason: the Italian airplanes were no match for the powerful airplanes ("Spitfires", etc..) of the English and -as he used to say- it was needed "suicidal courage" and not "normal courage" to engage in flight battles against the Allies with the "flying coffins", as were nicknamed the old Italian airplanes

During World War II, he was a Lieutenant in the Italian Army (Divisione "Brescia") in North Africa (Libya and Egypt). After nearly three years of fighting (from 1940 to 1942, when he also participated in the conquest of Tobruk) he was wounded and taken as a prisoner of war during the Battle of El Alamein in November 1942, receiving a military Medal of Honor signed by Mussolini.

When he returned to Italy from an Allied prisoner of war camp in Egypt, he founded the local branch of the Italian Social Movement in 1946. The neo-fascist party, co-founded in Salerno, was later named Alleanza Nazionale and in 2022 governed Italy under the name Fratelli d'Italia.

In 1947 married and had two children, Antonella and Bruno.

=== Influence in the Italian community of Venezuela ===
In 1951 D'Ambrosio moved to Venezuela, where he began working as director of the Banco Francés e Italiano (later called Banco Latino), financing the Italian community of Caracas, Maracaibo and Puerto La Cruz.

Many Italian-Venezuelan companies, including Vinccler and Constructora Delpre (which built the Parque Central Complex skyscrapers, which were until 2010 the tallest in South America), received his advice and financial help in order to grow at the first levels of the Venezuelan economy.

He was co-founder of the Casa de Italia and the Centro Italo-Venezolano of Caracas, and participated in many other health and social aid associations for low-income Italians. He also promoted the Italian language in Venezuela.

Santander Laya-Garrido cites him, in his book Los Italianos forjadores de la nacionalidad y del desarrollo económico en Venezuela ('The Italian creators of the nationality and the economic development of Venezuela'), as an example of honesty and dedication to the community.

His honesty led him to fight the growing but corrupted power of Pedro Tinoco (and his group called Twelve Apostles) when he became president of the Banco Central de Venezuela. However, in the 1980s, D'Ambrosio was forced by Tinoco to resign from Banco Latino, a bank which was involved in the biggest financial crisis of Venezuela soon after his resignation.

When Banco Latino went bankrupt in 1994, D'Ambrosio received an outstanding applause from the Association of Employees of the Latino Bank during a conference denouncing the corruption of Tinoco and others including Siro Febres Cordero.

D'Ambrosio is mainly remembered by the Italian community of Venezuela for his D'Ambrosio Era. From 1958 to 1978, along with his brother Mino, they ran Deportivo Italia at a time when soccer rose in prominence in Venezuela.

D'Ambrosio died on 15 April 1998 in Caracas.

== D'Ambrosio Era of Deportivo Italia ==
In 1958 Mino D'Ambrosio took control of Deportivo Italia and with his brother Pompeo, who financially controlled the team, led the soccer team to reach the top level in Venezuelan football.

The D'Ambrosio Era lasted for twenty years, until 1978, and was characterized by four championships of the Primera División Venezolana and the famous Little Maracanazo of 1971 (when Deportivo Italia won in the Stadium Maracanã of Rio de Janeiro the Fluminense, Champion of Brazil). The team won the Copa de Venezuela three times: in 1961, 1962, and 1970, and was runner-up in 1976. Furthermore, the team participated six times in the South American Copa Libertadores: in 1964, 1966, 1967, 1969, 1971, and 1972.

The 1960s were the "golden" years of Deportivo Italia because they were Venezuelan Champions in 1961, 1963, and 1966. The fourth title for the team was earned in 1972 (and was Runner-up in 1965, 1968, 1969, 1970, 1971).

Every year between 1961 and 1972, Deportivo Italia reached first or second place in the Venezuelan Championships or had a good performance in the South American Copa Libertadores.

Additionally, Deportivo Italia beat some renowned European teams in international competition, including in Milan in 1968, and was the first team in Venezuelan soccer history to reach the second round of the Copa Libertadores in 1964.

== Bibliography ==
- Briceño Javier. Un Sueño llamado Deportivo Petare. Universidad Catolica Andres Bello (Publicaciones y Tesis). Caracas, 2013 (Pompeo D'Ambrosio, p.33)
- Santander Laya-Garrido, Alfonso. Los Italianos forjadores de la nacionalidad y del desarrollo economico en Venezuela. Editorial Vadell. Valencia, 1978.
- Vannini, Maria. Italia y los Italianos en la historia y en la cultura de Venezuela. Oficina Central de Informacion. Caracas, 1966.
- Velásquez Ramón. J., Silva Carlos Rafael. El Ejecutivo Nacional y la Intervencion del Banco Latino. Talleres Gráficos de Joaquín Ibarra/Impresores. Caracas, 1994.
- Zapata, Juan Carlos. Dr. Tinoco. Vida y muerte del poder en Venezuela. Colección Claroscuro. Caracas, 2006.
