= Unidad Educativa Juan XXIII =

Italo-Venezuelan P.E.U "John XXIII"
- U.E.P Italo – Venezolano "Juan XXIII"
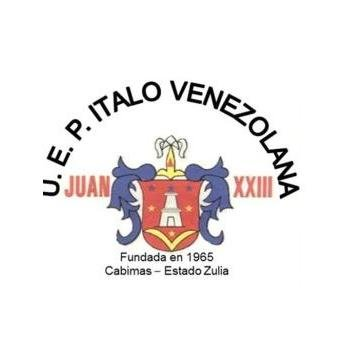

Location
- Street 1 Cabimas, Zulia, 4013; Venezuela
- Coordinates: 10°24′03.3″N 71°28′07.3″W

Information
- School type: Italo-Venezuelan, Private
- Religious affiliation: Christian – Catholic
- Founded: 1965
- Status: Open
- Category: Preschool, Primary, Secondary
- Rector: Jorge Rincón
- Gender: Co-ed
- Age range: 4–17
- Language: Spanish, Italian
- Campus type: Urban
- Affiliation: AVEC

Unidad Educativa Juan XXIII (U.E.P Italo – Venezolano "Juan XXIII") is a private, rosminian, Italo-Venezuelan school, of preschool, primary and secondary education, located in Cabimas, Venezuela.
