= Victoria de Stefano =

Italian-Venezuelan writer (1940–2023)

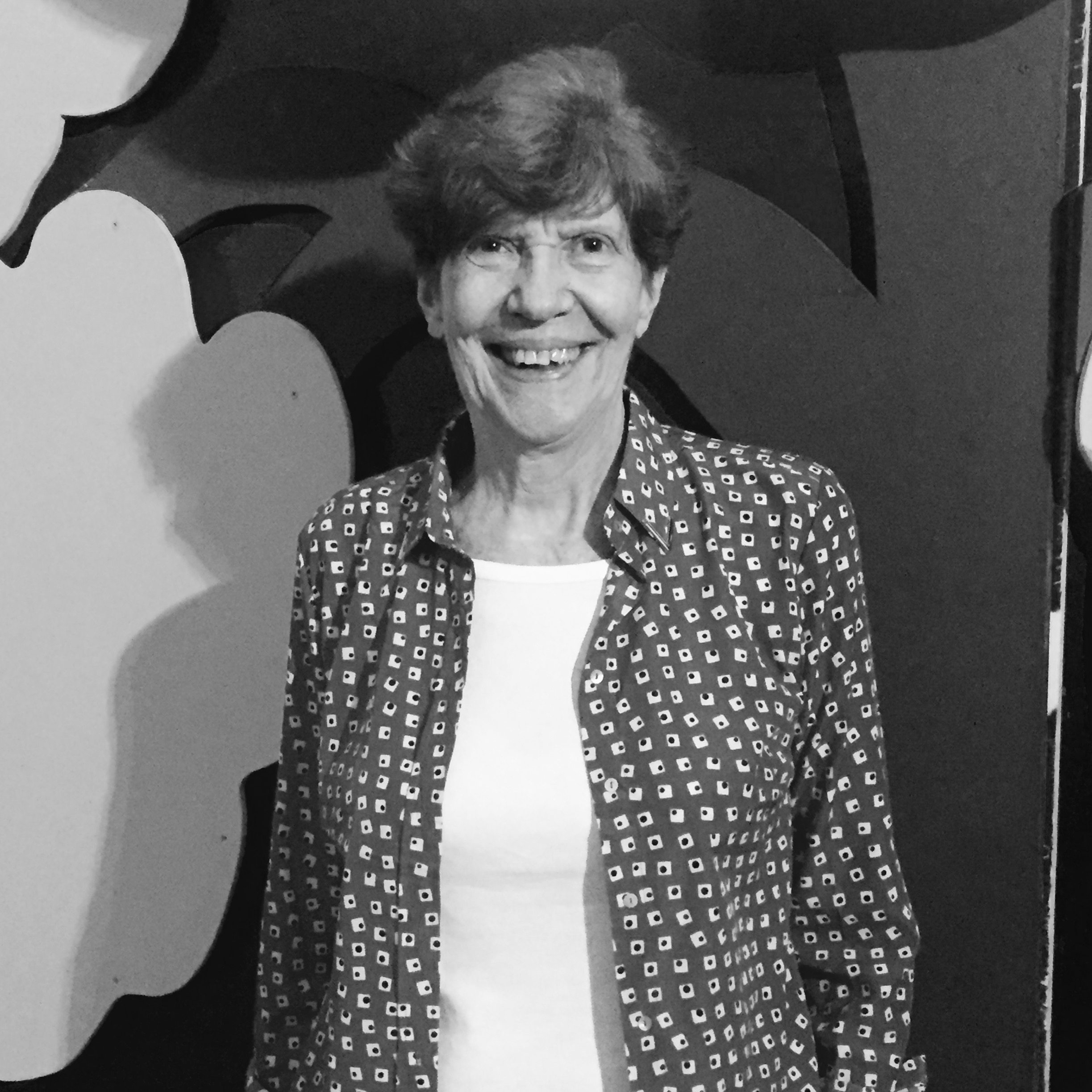
- De Stefano in 2016
- Born: Victoria de Stefano; 21 June 1940; Rimini, Italy
- Died: 6 January 2023 (aged 82); Caracas, Venezuela
- Occupation: Novelist
- Spouse: Pedro Duno

Victoria de Stefano (21 June 1940 – 6 January 2023) was an Italo-Venezuelan writer, philosopher, and educator, best known for her work as a novelist and essayist.

== Early life and education ==
Victoria de Stefano was born in Rimini, Italy, in 1940, and moved to Venezuela with her family in 1946. She reflects this experience in Su vida, a collection of autobiographical texts published in 2019.

She studied at the Instituto Politécnico Educacional. She graduated with a degree in philosophy from the Universidad Central de Venezuela (UCV) in 1962.

== Exile ==
De Stefano, her husband Pedro Duno and their two sons went into exile at the end of 1962. They lived in Havana, Cuba; Algeria; Switzerland; Paris, France; and Sitges, Spain.

== Return to Venezuela ==
De Stefano and her family returned to Caracas in 1966. There, she worked as a researcher at the Institute of Philosophy at the Universidad Central de Venezuela and taught Aesthetics, Contemporary Philosophy, and Art Theory at both the School of Philosophy and the School of Art.

== Personal life and death ==
De Stefano was married to the philosopher Pedro Duno, with whom she had two sons: Rodrigo Duno and Martín Duno. De Stefano and Duno later separated.

De Stefano died in Caracas on 6 January 2023, at the age of 82.

== Publications ==
De Stefano's works include:

- El desolvido (1971),
- Sartre y el marxismo (1975)
- La noche llama la noche (1985),
- Poesía y Modernidad, Baudelaire (1984)
- El lugar del escritor (1990)
- Cabo de vida (1993)
- Historias de la marcha a pie (1997)
- Lluvia (Barcelona: Candaya, 2002)
- Paleografías (2010)
- Historias de la marcha a pie (Reed. 2013)
- Su vida (El Taller Blanco Ediciones, Bogotá. 2019 )
- Venimos, vamos (Planeta, 2019)

== Prizes ==
De Stefano won the following prizes:

- Premio Municipal de Ensayo (1984)
- Finalist in the Premio Internacional de Novela Rómulo Gallegos (1999)
- Premio Municipal de Novela (2006).
