= Milena Sardi de Selle =

Milena Sardi de Selle (1926-2008) was a Venezuelan psychiatrist, academic and politician.

== Life ==
After studying at the Central University of Venezuela (UCV), she became a professor of anatomy. She then trained as a psychiatrist for children and adolescents at McGill University and the Montreal Children's Hospital in Canada, and joined the Department of Psychiatry at UCV's Vargas Medical School and the Psychiatry Service of the Hospital José María Vargas in Caracas. She founded the unit of family therapy there in 1966, and in 1968 created child and adolescent psychiatry as a subject within the Medicine Faculty's postgraduate psychiatry course. In 1987 she created a postgraduate course in child psychiatry at UCV.

She was Minister of Women's Affairs from 1981 to 1984 and Minister of Youth from 1984 to 1986. In 1992 she became the first women to be a full member of the Venezuelan National Academy of Medicine.

== Works ==
- Venezuela esquizofrénica : los prerrequisitos de la salud mental [Schizophrenic Venezuela: the prerequisites of mental health], 1993
