= Jorge Rigamonti =

Venezuelan architect (1940–2008)

- Born: April 18, 1940; Milan, Italy
- Died: April 15, 2008 (aged 67); Caracas, Venezuela
- Education: Central University of Venezuela
- Occupation: Architect
- Spouse: Helena Correa de Rigamonti
- Children: 2
- Awards: Venezuelan National Architectural Award, 2006; International Grand Prize at the IX Panamerican Biennial of Architecture of Quito, 1994
- Buildings: CARBONORCA Service Buildings Complex; Cayo Crasquí Ecological Tourism Camp; San Carlos Gymnastics Arena; San Cristobal Gymnastics Arena; SIDOR Main Service and Dining Center
- Projects: Petroleum Museum of Venezuela; Urban Collages (1966/1971); Plaza del Sol, Public Market and Transfer Terminal; Hypothesis of Integration of Building & Urban Standards

Jorge Rigamonti (born Giorgio Rigamonti, April 18, 1940 – April 15, 2008) was a Venezuelan architect who produced national and international award-winning designs, an active architecture professor for over 30 years, a speaker and jury member at numerous international seminars and competitions, and a committed contributor to the dissemination of architecture, in particular as co-founding director of Venezuela's “Architecture Museum Foundation”. His office was notable for achieving functional and cost-effective solutions, while pursuing a social aim and environmental harmony. Many of his designs showcased innovative lightweight metallic structures that created exteriors permeable to sunlight and wind, along with vertical gardens, designed to generate a pleasant microclimate in the tropics. Among the awards he received is the International Grand Prize at the IX Pan-American Biennial of Architecture of Quito, Ecuador in 1994, for Cayo Crasquí's Ecological Tourism Camp. In 2006, he received the Venezuelan National Architectural Award for his career trajectory. His wife, Helena Correa de Rigamonti, collaborated with his office through most of his career. His architectural drawings of SIDOR Main Service and Dining Center and eight of his urban collages are part of the permanent collection of The Museum of Modern Art (New York) MoMA and were part of the MoMA's exhibition "Latin America in Construction" in 2015.

== Conceptual objectives ==
Jorge Rigamonti sought to “provide architectures that respect the environment, where ecology and functionality express the new emerging culture, and where technological progress is understood as a process of human emancipation through man's re-encounter with nature, and through the solutions that nature inspires.” His architecture comprises shapes and spaces that evoke local meanings, as well as those of other lands, reconciling the universal and the particular, what is foreign and what is one's own. It combines various themes including: modernity, technology, the city, the meaning of shapes and the sense of place.

== Early years and education ==
Jorge Rigamonti was born in Milan, Italy on April 18, 1940. At age 10, Rigamonti immigrated along with his parents to Venezuela. In 1958, he started studying architecture at the Central University of Venezuela, where he was a student, among others, of Cuban architect Ricardo Porro. In 1961, Rigamonti traveled to Havana as an apprentice to Mr. Porro, who was commissioned the National Art Schools (Cuba) project. That trip, which then continued to the United States, France and Italy, was revealing to Rigamonti, giving him the opportunity to visit great works of architecture. In 1963, along with a few other classmates, Rigamonti organized an architectural tour of the United States, which was sponsored by the U.S. State Department, and in which they were greeted by several of the major metropolitan urban planning offices (including Boston, Chicago and Los Angeles). That trip gave Rigamonti access to the formulations that were being made to design and regulate urban growth, and led him to develop a proposal for new cities based on the continuous subdivision of space, which was then crystallized in his undergraduate thesis work. Rigamonti obtained his Degree on Architecture at the Central University of Venezuela in 1966, with the thesis “Formulation of a Constructive Hypothesis Based on a Search of the Integration of Building and Urbanistic Standards”. Using Buckminster Fuller’s studies of geometrical structures (i.e. polyhedrons) as a starting point, Rigamonti conceived modules that could be repeated in space in a fashion similar to mineral crystals or body tissue cells. In 1967, his thesis work was exhibited at the World Design Science Decade exhibition in London organized by The Architectural Association School of Architecture, Buckminster Fuller and John McHale (artist). This work received the “Best Thesis” award from the es:Colegio de Arquitectos de Venezuela at the Third Biennial of Architecture in 1967

== Notable works ==
=== Carbones del Orinoco C.A. Service Buildings Complex (1988 / 1990) ===
Ciudad Guayana, Bolivar State, Venezuela

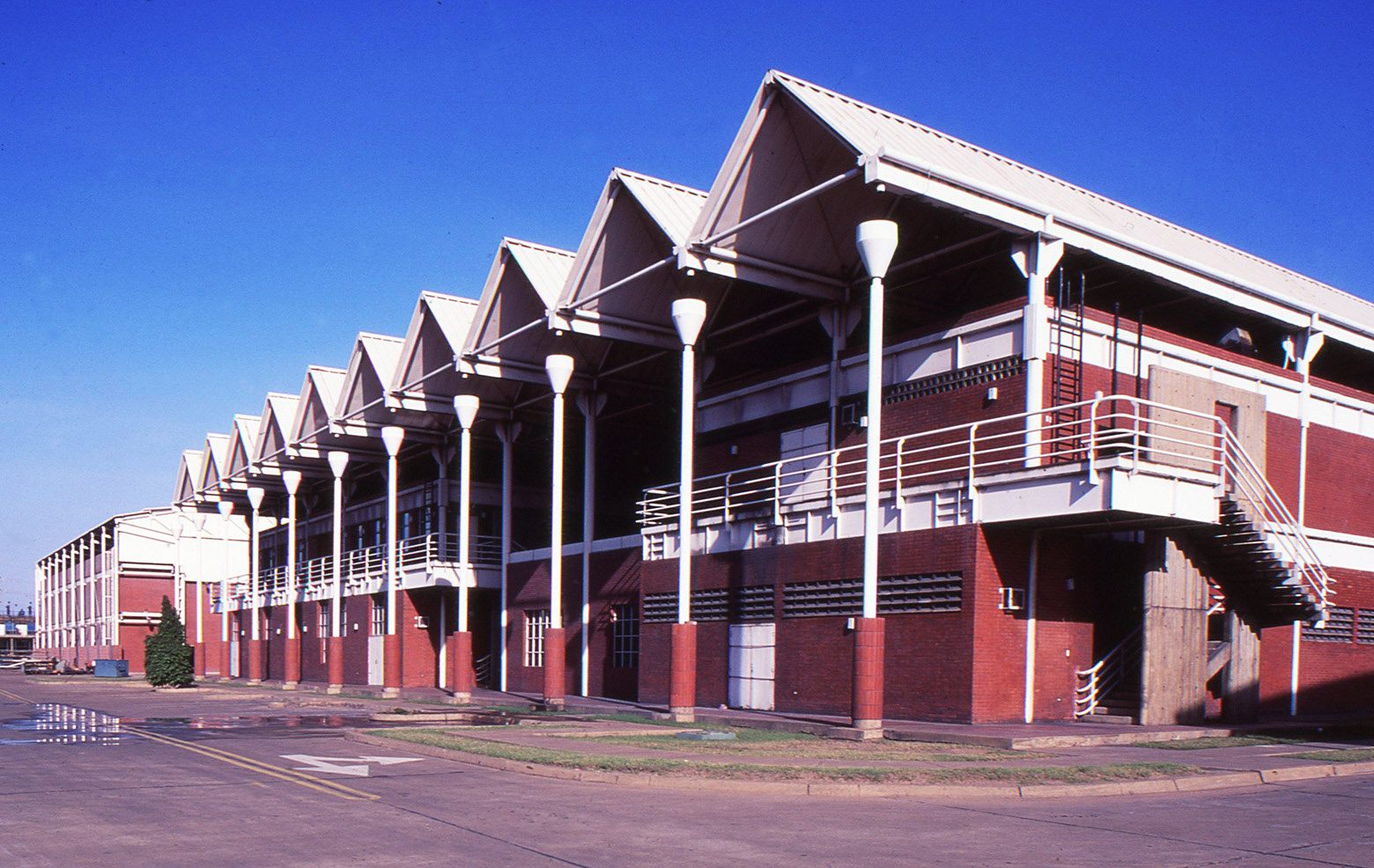
CARBONORCA Service Buildings from Jorge Rigamonti - zigzag umbrella roof - 1984

Commissioned by Corporación Venezolana de Guayana (CVG), this project aimed at making more humane industrial buildings in Ciudad Guayana, creating a portico reinterpreting the coastal walkway along the Orinoco River in the neighboring colonial city of Ciudad Bolívar. The four buildings that integrate the project showcase Rigamonti's concept of "the umbrella roof culture versus the wall culture", integrating elements that provide shade creating a gentler microclimate, in contrast to the ordinary elements that only delimit and exclude exterior space. Accordingly, Rigamonti integrates double roofs, covered corridors, pergolas and porticos creating a dialogue between interior and exterior spaces. In 1991, the project was part of the exhibition “Architecture and the Tropics, Venezuela” presented at the fifth International Architecture Biennial of Venice and at the Maison de l'Architecture of Paris, France, among others. In 1998, the project obtains the First Prize in the “Office, Commerce and Tourism” category of the ninth National Biennial of Architecture of Venezuela.

=== Cayo Crasquí Ecological Tourism Camp (1991 / 1993) ===
Inaugurated in 1993 - Cayo Crasquí, Los Roques Archipelago National Park, Venezuela

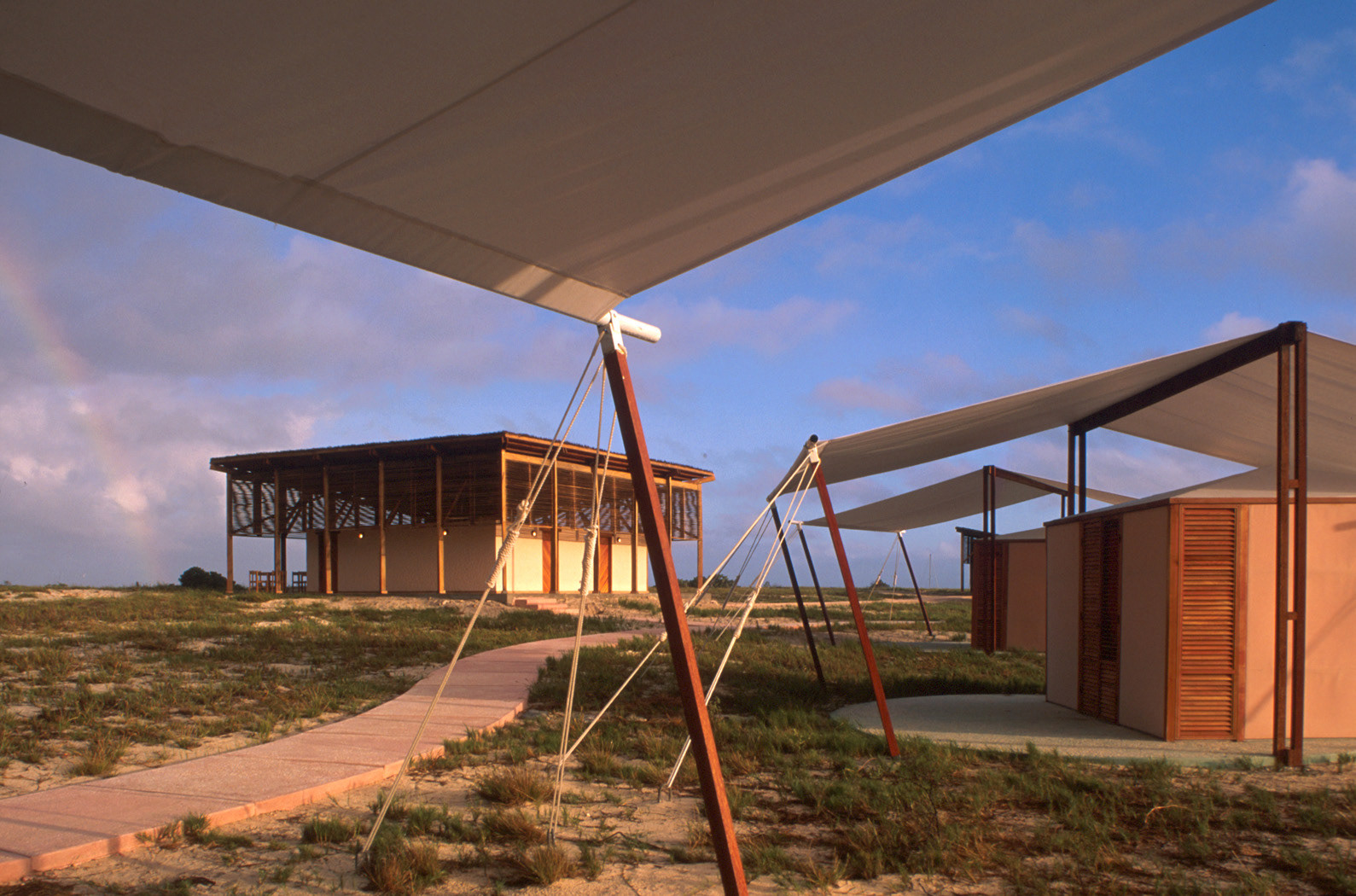
Cayo Crasqui Ecological Tourism Camp from Arch Jorge Rigamonti - 1993

The campsite implemented architecture with a minimum environmental impact, built from biodegradable materials, wood and canvas using traditional assembly methods. The campsite generated its own electricity and desalinated sea-water for drinking. Wastewater was treated in bio-percolators consisting of large cylinders filled with corallite stone, and was used for watering the native vegetation. The roofs of service buildings enabled channeling rainwater into subterranean tanks for emergency water supply. The campsite consisted of 5 buildings and 25 tents. The tents were designed to withstand high winds, were removable, and were composed of: double tops; double canvas walls; and wooden venetian blind doors and adjustable windows, providing good cover from the sun, ventilation, and optimal natural climatic comfort. The central building with a circular base consisted of four modules surrounding a patio, creating both an ancient and modern architecture at the same time. The camp operated open to the public from 1993 to 1996 when it ceased to operate having been part of the assets intervened by FOGADE (Bank Deposits Social Protection Fund) following the Venezuelan banking crisis of 1994. The project was part of the exhibition “Homo Ecologicus, Towards a Culture of Sustainability” at the Fundació Joan Miró, Barcelona, Spain, 1996. Also, it was among the finalist projects for the 1993/98 period at the first Ibero-American Biennial of Architecture, Urbanism and Civil Engineering, Madrid, Spain, 1998.

=== Gymnastics Arena of San Carlos (2003) ===
Inaugurated for the XV National Sport Games - San Carlos, Cojedes State, Venezuela

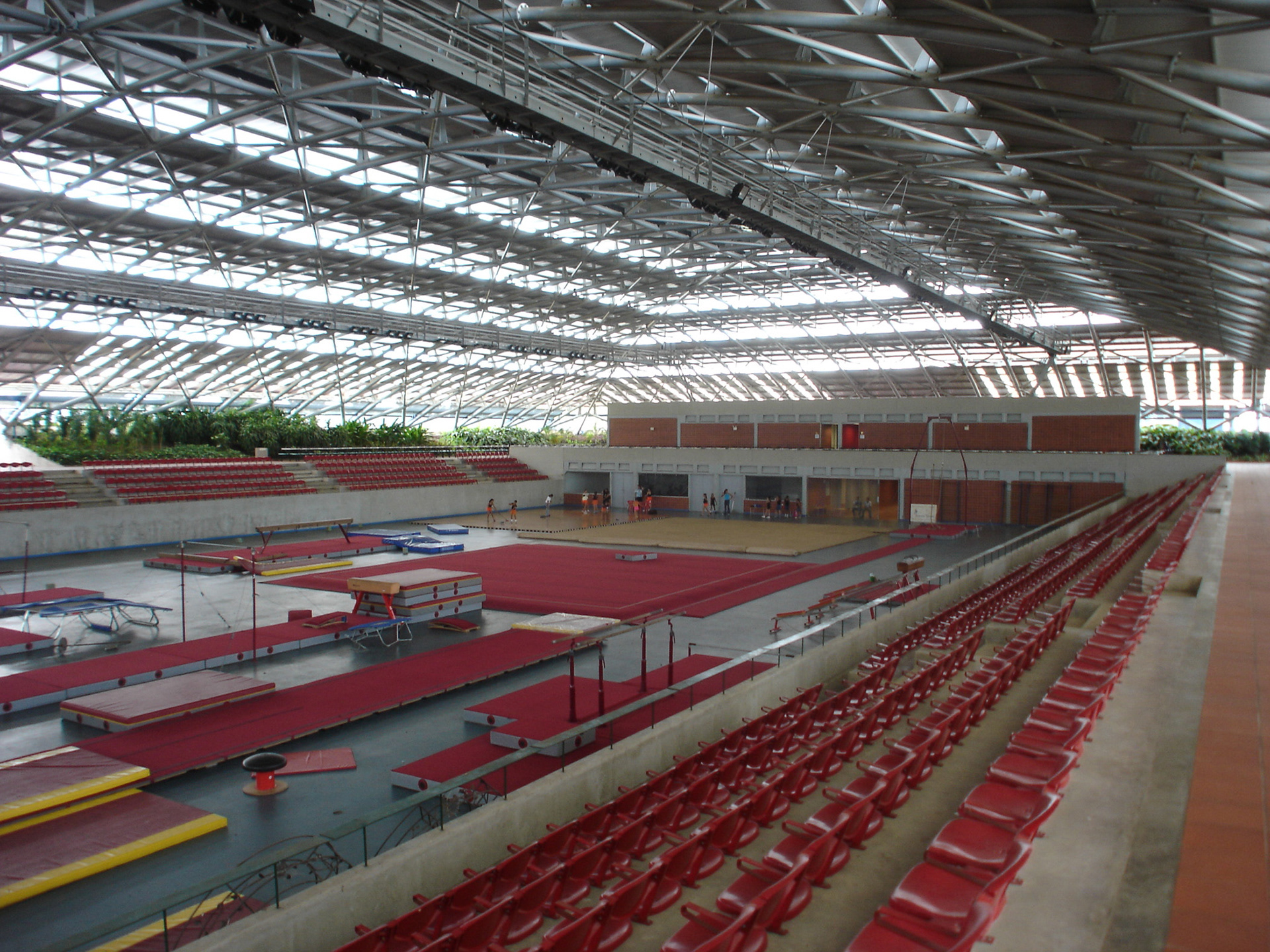
Gymnastics Arena of San Carlos from Arch Jorge Rigamonti - interior - 2003

The building was conceived as an artificial hill that recalls the surrounding topography and is permeable to wind and light while preventing the penetration of tropical rain. It creates a large covered space of 102 x 66 meters without columns and with a natural microclimate. The roof is made of a tubular structure "mesh" that forms a dome shape with an orthogonal base.

=== Gymnastics Arena of San Cristóbal (2005) ===
Inaugurated for the XVI National Sport Games - San Cristóbal, Táchira State, Venezuela
The San Cristobal Gymnastics Arena was the evolution of its predecessor the San Carlos Gymnastics Arena. Like its predecessor it resembles a soft artificial hill defined by a broad stepped roof built from insulating sheets and a light metallic tubular structure arched in both directions. The tropical vegetation and openings located throughout the inner perimeter create a natural microclimate, generating natural ascending ventilation that lowers the temperature of the inner environment, while also softening the exterior daylight. Also, the garden edges isolate the arena from external view and noises. In 2006, the project received the “2005 Ministry of Culture Prize”, and the building was declared “Cultural Heritage” by the Venezuelan Institute of Cultural Heritage.

=== Main Service and Dining Center of Siderúrgica del Orinoco C.A. (1976) ===
Ciudad Guayana, Bolívar State, Venezuela

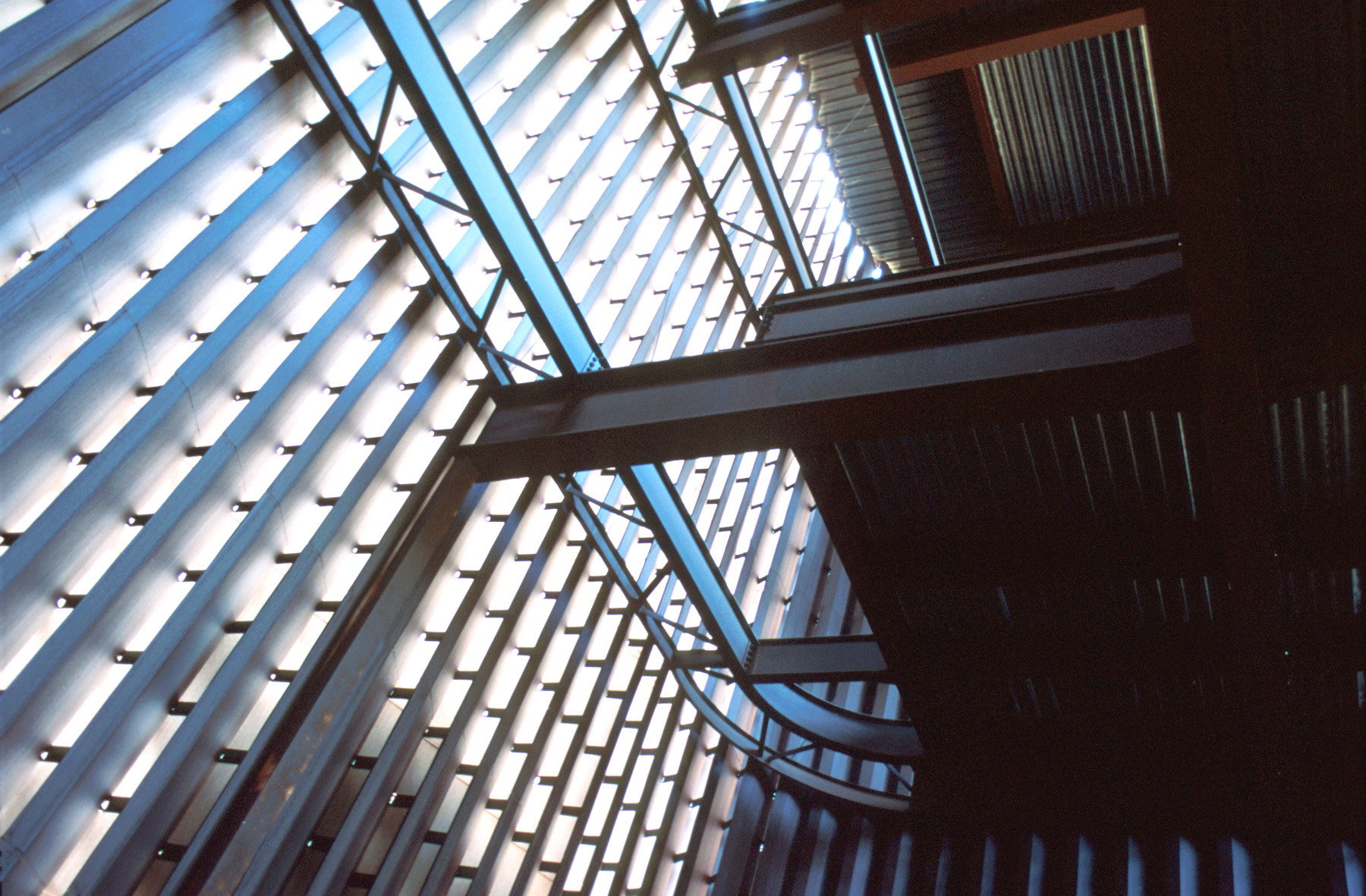
SIDOR Service and Dining Center by Arch Jorge Rigamonti - interior unfinished - 1976

The multifunctional building was designed to serve 3800 meals per hour through a system of peripheral dining rooms surrounding a central food station, shortening the distance walked by users. The building's Mayari Weathering steel enclosing elements allowed mitigated access of light and breeze, while prevented the passage of rain. These enclosures with their natural dark brown oxide color, combined with the hanging vegetation in the peripheral prefabricated boxes, contrasted with the neighboring buildings that excessively reflect the intense tropical sun. The building construction started in 1976. However, by 1979 the construction was halted and the building was left abandoned.

== Notable projects not built ==
=== Petroleum Museum of Venezuela – Urban Complex (1984) ===
Cabimas, Zulia State, Venezuela

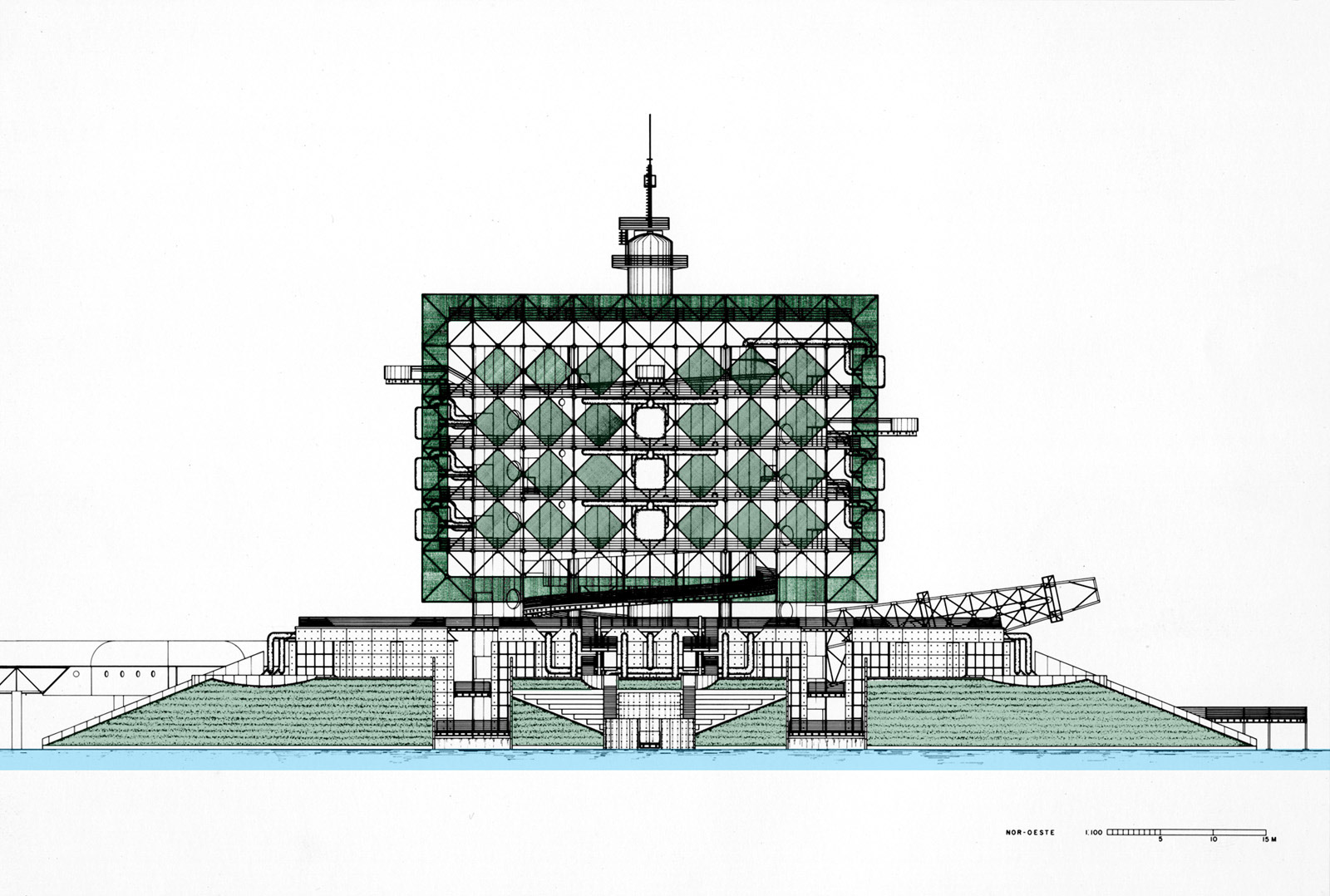
Petroleum Museum of Venezuela project drawing by Jorge Rigamonti - Facade - 1984

Commissioned by Petróleos de Venezuela S.A. PDVSA (Venezuela's state oil company), the project had an overarching goal of creating a major tourism and recreational center. The project took inspiration from: Lake Maracaibo with its original “Palafitos” (stilt house) and its modern days oil rigs; the oil refineries; the Venezuelan land represented by the Tepui Guayanes; and the tropical vegetation (which was recreated throughout the park and building). Inside the museum's building, visitors would follow a path similar to that of oil as it is extracted. They would circulate from the underground level through a “Geological Tunnel” into the circular metallic grid platform suspended above a water pond, with an unexpected view through an inclined oil derrick. Visitors would then take the transparent-walled elevator inside the “refinery distillation tower” located at the center of the “Vertical Patio” with square base surrounded by reflecting glass walls that produce the effect of an infinite refinery. The tour would then continue downwards through the spiral ramp (located inside the cylindrical building), where visitors view the “infinite refinery” on the outside, and an exhibition on the inside about products derived from oil. The enclosing cylinder was itself surrounded by a lightweight tubular structure forming a cube with façades partially covered with vines (climber-plants). In 1987, the project was awarded the “Best Unbuilt Project” Prize at the VIII Architecture National Biennial of Venezuela.

=== Plaza del Sol, Public Market and Transfer Terminal (2002) ===
Baruta, Caracas, Venezuela
The project included a bus terminal with shops and other services for the local community. Also, the building connected to an adjacent cultural center via a pedestrian bridge. The project aimed at providing a comfortable natural micro climate to users through facades with vertical gardens permeable to wind, and a large "umbrella" roof that provided shade while partially letting in sunlight. It received the "Acknowledgement prize 2005 Latin America” at the International Holcim Awards for sustainable construction.

== Urban collage ==
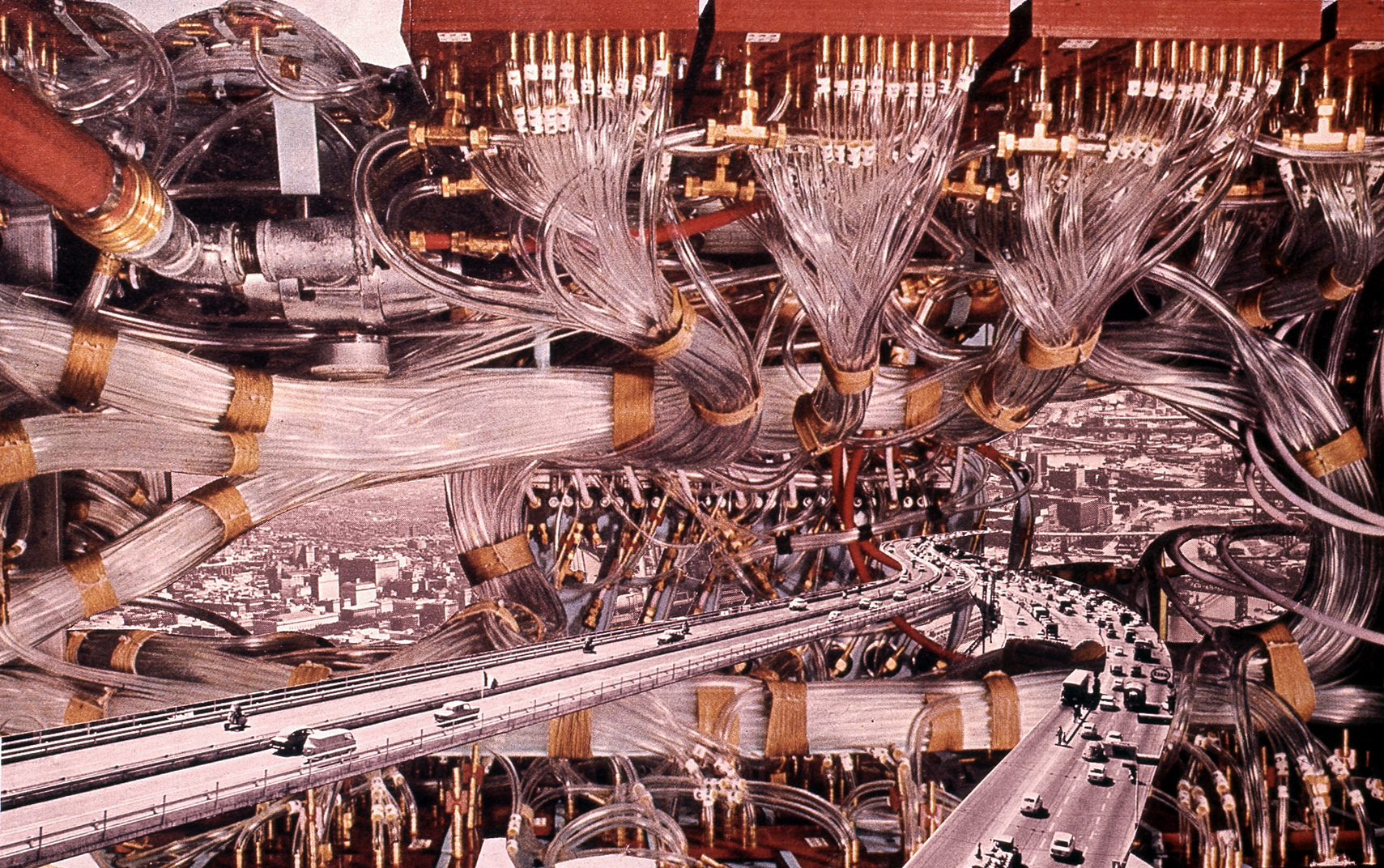
Urban Fluidity 2 collage by Jorge Rigamonti - 1967

From 1966 to 1971, Jorge Rigamonti produced multiple “urban collages”. These collages were part of the exploration about the metropolis of the future that Rigamonti initiated with his thesis work. They manifest the ambiguity of industrialization and technology, expressing on one hand their attractiveness and beauty, and on the other hand their potential threat. Eight of these collages are part of the permanent collection of The Museum of Modern Art (New York) MoMA and were part of the MoMA's exhibitions "Latin America in Construction" (Mar-Jul 2015) and "Automania" (Jul 2021–Jan 2022).

== Academic activities ==
For over 30 years (1969 to 2003) Rigamonti was a professor at the School of Architecture and Urbanism of the Central University of Venezuela in Caracas, lecturing on architectural design, theory of architectural design and urban design among other subjects at the undergraduate and postgraduate level. Rigamonti also taught as an invited professor in other Venezuelan universities and abroad.
