= José Grasso Vecchio =

Venezuelan lawyer and financial analyst

José Grasso Vecchio is a Venezuelan lawyer, financial analyst, university professor, writer, former president of the Venezuelan Professional Baseball League, cofounder of Softline Consultores and Instituto Latinoamericano de Actualización Profesional. Grasso Vecchio served as CEO of Banesco Banco Universal, and currently serves as CEO of the Caracas Stock Exchange

== Career ==
Grasso Vecchio graduated from the Universidad Católica Andrés Bello (UCAB), he has a Master's in Comparative Law at Southern Methodist University in Dallas, Texas. Then he pursued a program in Advanced Management for Bankers at The Wharton School in Philadelphia, and took courses in economics and finance at Boston University.

He started his career in banking in 1976 at Banco Venezolano de Crédito, creating the trust fund department of this institution. Later he became a vice president overseeing trust funds, corporate banking, and credit, and was appointed executive director, a position he held until 2004. During this period he was also founder-president of Vencred Financial Services, and director of multiple companies in the fields of insurance, mortgage banking investment banking and financial leasing. He has been director of Banesco Banco Universal in Panama, the Dominican Republic, and the US.

Grasso Vecchio has also held management and directorial positions in prominent institutions such as the Venezuelan-Swiss Chamber of Commerce and Industry, the Venezuelan Banking Association, and the Caracas Chamber of Commerce. He founded and directed the Venezuelan Downs Syndrome Association. He was president of the Venezuelan Professional Baseball League, been re-elected three times between 2007 and 2013.

He has taught finance and banking at undergraduate and postgraduate levels at UCAB, Universidad Metropolitana, IESA, Universidad Metropolitana and Universidad Monteávila. He teaches banking operations and banking products and services at Instituto Latinoamericano de Actualización Profesional ILAP.

== Current positions ==
Grasso Vecchio is an investment adviser registered with the National Registry of Securities. He is director of Banesco, Banco Universal, founder and director of Softline management consultants, and is on the board of directors of the Venezuelan Banking Association. He is director and co-founder of ICG Consultores and Instituto Latinoamericano de Actualización Profesional (Ilap).
