= Pascual Venegas Filardo =

Venezuelan poet, writer, and journalist

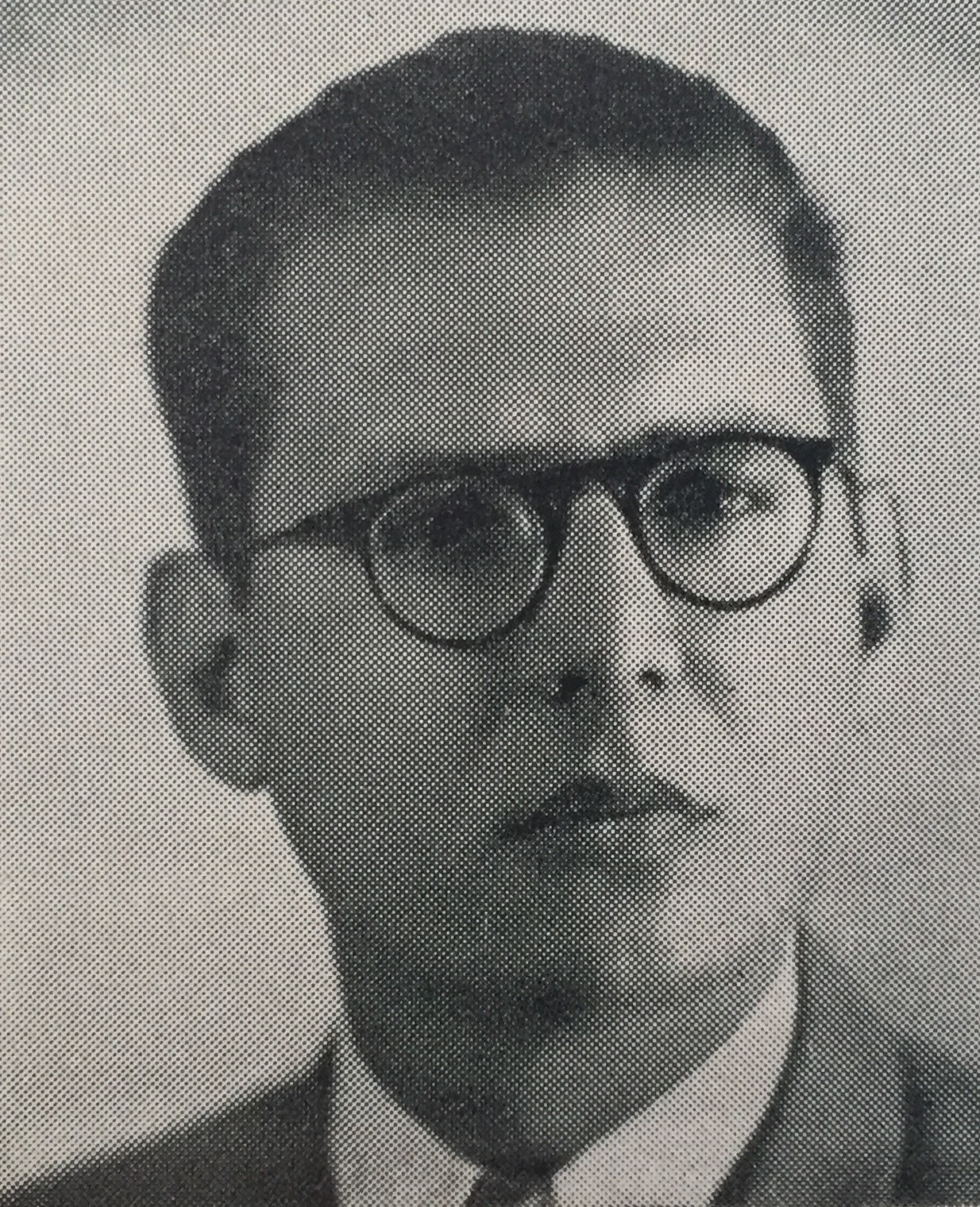
Filardo in 1952

Pascual Venegas Filardo (March 25, 1911 – June 4, 2003) was a Venezuelan poet, writer, and journalist.
