= Colegio Humboldt, Caracas =

Coordinates: 10.512270°N 66.867301°W

Colegio Humboldt
- Caracas; Venezuela

Information
- Established: May 15, 1894; 131 years ago
- Language: German Spanish English French

Colegio Humboldt, Caracas is a German school located in Caracas, Venezuela.

== History ==
Founded on May 15, 1894, with the name "Deutsche Schule" (Spanish: Colegio Alemán; literally means "German School") upon the initiative of German citizens and the then ambassador Count von Kleist-Tychow.

Since the 1998–1999 school year, the name of the school was changed to "Colegio de Encuentro Bicultural Humboldt" via an agreement signed between the German and Venezuelan governments. Now it is called "Colegio Humboldt Caracas". It is one of the best schools in Caracas and in Venezuela, the only one which offers four language (German, Spanish, English, French) teaching and a unique experience of true bicultural environment.

== System ==
The school consists of four parts, Kindergarten, Elementary, Middle and High school. The German school system also has a way of graduation called "Abitur" which is offered for People who are in the "e" section. The sections are until fifth grade (sixth in German system) A-Spanish B-Spanish C-Spanish and D-German each section is a classroom. On sixth grade there is an Exam and kids from the Spanish section can go to the German which are now two classrooms each E1 and E2.

== See also ==
- German Venezuelan
