= Colegio Amerigo Vespucci =

Coordinates: 10.49804°N 66.83162°W

- Caracas; Venezuela

Information
- Established: 1958; 68 years ago
- Language: Italian and Spanish
- Website: www.uecav.com

Colegio Amerigo Vespucci is an Italian private school in Caracas, Venezuela. It is named for the Italian explorer Amerigo Vespucci and is a "Unidad Educativa" with more than 2000 students. In the Venezuelan "bachillerato" of the Colegio Vespucci the courses of Italian language are mandatory.

== See also ==
- Colegio Agustín Codazzi
- Colegio De Marta
- Italian Venezuelans
- Italian language in Venezuela
