= Colegio De Marta =

Colegio Angelo De Marta

Location
- Avenida Constitución; Puerto la Cruz, Anzoátegui, 6023; Venezuela; 10.21160°N 64.64061°W

Information
- Established: 1956; 70 years ago
- Language: Italian and Spanish
- Website: colegioitaloplc.edu.ve

Colegio Italo-Venezolano Angelo De Marta is an Italian private school in Puerto La Cruz (Venezuela).

== Data ==
The Colegio Angelo De Marta has nearly one thousand students. It is located in the metropolitan area "Puerto la Cruz-Barcelona" that has more than a million inhabitants, of which nearly 50000 are Italians and/or their descendants. It is the second most important Italo-venezuelan school in Venezuela.

The school is an italo-venezuelan unidad educativa and has "kinder", "elementary" and "bachelor" (or high school) sections, where the Italian language lessons are mandatory.

== History ==
On October 12, 1956, they began the activities in Venezuela the Italian School "Angelo De Marta", with the vision of keeping alive the Italian language for the Italian future generations grown in Venezuelan territory.

Subsequently, on November 25, 1959, a philanthropic group of Italian entrepreneurs of Venezuela began the construction of campus facilities, supported by Mr. Angelo De Marta, consul of Italy at the time, who donated the land where now are the headquarters of the institution. Initially the school was only in Italian language, but in the late 1960s started to be bilingual. Later was created the Unidad Educativa Colegio Italovenezolano Angelo De Marta, that actually has courses of Italian language even for relatives of students.

The first graduation of the College Italo-Venezolano "Angelo De Marta" was held on September 25, 1971, with the graduation of 29 bachelors of Science and 10 in Humanities. Recently there were the celebrations of the 59th years of existence of the Colegio De Marta

== See also ==
- Colegio Agustín Codazzi
- Colegio Amerigo Vespucci
- Colegio Antonio Rosmini
- Italo-Venezuelans
- Italian language in Venezuela
