= Colegio Agustín Codazzi =

Location
- Av.da Los Pinos, Quinta Elisa, La Florida - Caracas; Caracas; Venezuela; 10.5049369°N 66.87454100000002°W

Information
- Other name: Scuola Italiana di Caracas
- Established: 1951
- Language: Italian (and Spanish, English)

Colegio Agustín Codazzi is an Italian international school in La Florida, Caracas, Venezuela.

== Data ==
The "Colegio Codazzi" has Scuola infanzia “O. Molinari” (preschool), Scuola elementare “O.Molinari” (primary school) and Scuola media “Leonardo Da Vinci” (middle school) through Scuola secondaria (Liceo scientifico “Venezuela”) (upper secondary school).

It is named after Agostino Codazzi, who was an Italian military, scientist, geographer, cartographer, and governor of Barinas (1846-1847) and made his main investigations and cartographic work in Venezuela and Colombia, thereby creating for both countries a complete set of maps and statistics after the tumultuous post-independence years from the Spanish Empire.

The "Collegio Agostino Codazzi" (as is called in Italian) is the main Italian school of Caracas and Venezuela.

Furthermore, the Codazzi is officially labeled as an overseas Italian school recognized by the Ministry of Foreign Affairs of Italy.

== History ==
The Codazzi was founded by Italian immigrants in 1951. In the 1960s it had nearly one thousand students, when the Italian colony was the biggest immigrant colony in Caracas. In the 1960s and 1970s it was one of the two main European schools of Caracas, with the German Colegio Humboldt. In those decades in the Italian community of Caracas the two more attended schools by students were the Codazzi and the Colegio Amerigo Vespucci, with rivalry also in sport matches (like soccer).

The Codazzi began following also a Venezuelan curriculum in 1986, that was temporarily closed in 2011

Recently the school has suffered economic problems because of the recent Venezuelan crisis, but it has overcome the difficulties thanks in part to the help of the Italian Embassy in Caracas.

== Notable alumni ==
- Princess Victoria Romanovna, member of the former Russian imperial family

== See also ==
- Colegio Amerigo Vespucci
- Colegio De Marta
- Italo-Venezuelans
- Italian language in Venezuela
