= Italian language in Venezuela =

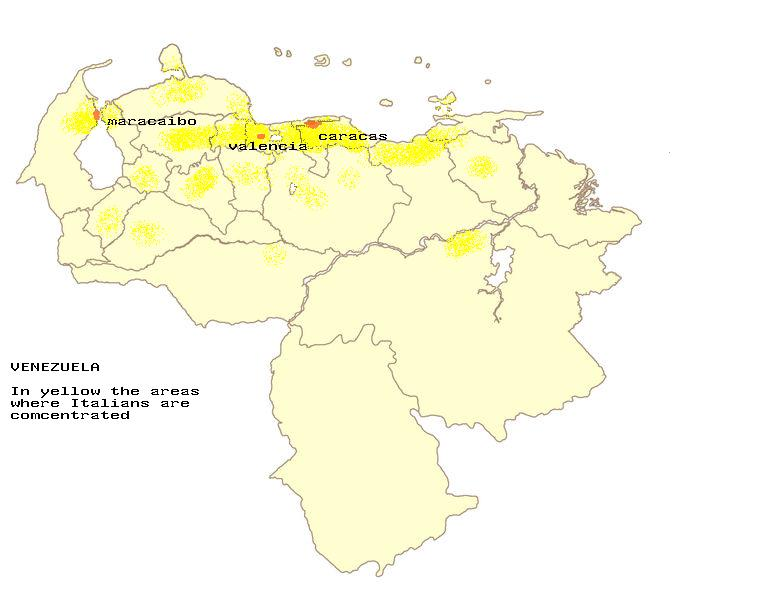
Areas (in yellow) where the Italian language is spoken in Venezuela by the Italian community

The Italian language in Venezuela has been present since colonial times in the areas around Caracas, Maracay, Valencia, Maracaibo and the Andes Mountains. The language is found in many idiomatic sentences and words in Venezuelan Spanish. There are around 200,000 Italian speakers in the country, making it the second most spoken language in Venezuela, after Spanish.

== History ==
The name of Venezuela itself comes from the Italian Amerigo Vespucci, who called the area "Little Venice" in a typical Italian expression. Some Italians participated in the first European colonies in Venezuela, mainly on the island of Margarita and in Cumaná, the first European city in the Americas, but their influence on the local language was very limited.

During the Venezuelan Wars of Independence, some Italians helped Simón Bolivar against the Spanish Empire; they contributed Italian military words to Venezuelan Spanish. The military officer Agostino Codazzi created the first Atlante of Venezuela and as a consequence, many geographical words in Venezuela are loanwords from Italian.

In the second half of the 20th century, more than 300,000 Italians moved to Venezuela – many in particular emigrating following World War II – leaving their linguistic imprint on the local vocabulary: Ciao is now a usual friendly salute in Caracas, for example. There are also expressions among local young people which mix Italian and Spanish words: "Muérete que chao" is an example. Sifrinos, the upper class in Caracas, use a number of Italian words and expressions.

Today, there are more than 5 million Venezuelans with some Italian roots: some young Italo-Venezuelans in Caracas use slang mixing Italian dialect and Spanish among themselves. Italians also influenced the Venezuelan accent, given its slight sing-songy intonation, like Rioplatense Spanish.

Nearly all the Italians in Venezuela who speak Italian live in the half of the country north of the Orinoco-Apure rivers, while only a few thousand live in the Ciudad Bolivar-Ciudad Guayana and San Felipe areas of the Apure-Amazonas-Bolivar states.

== Italian-language instruction in Venezuela ==
In the 2000s there are nearly 50,000 Italians residing in Venezuela who speak a variety of Italian with their sons and daughters (second generation Italo-Venezuelans).

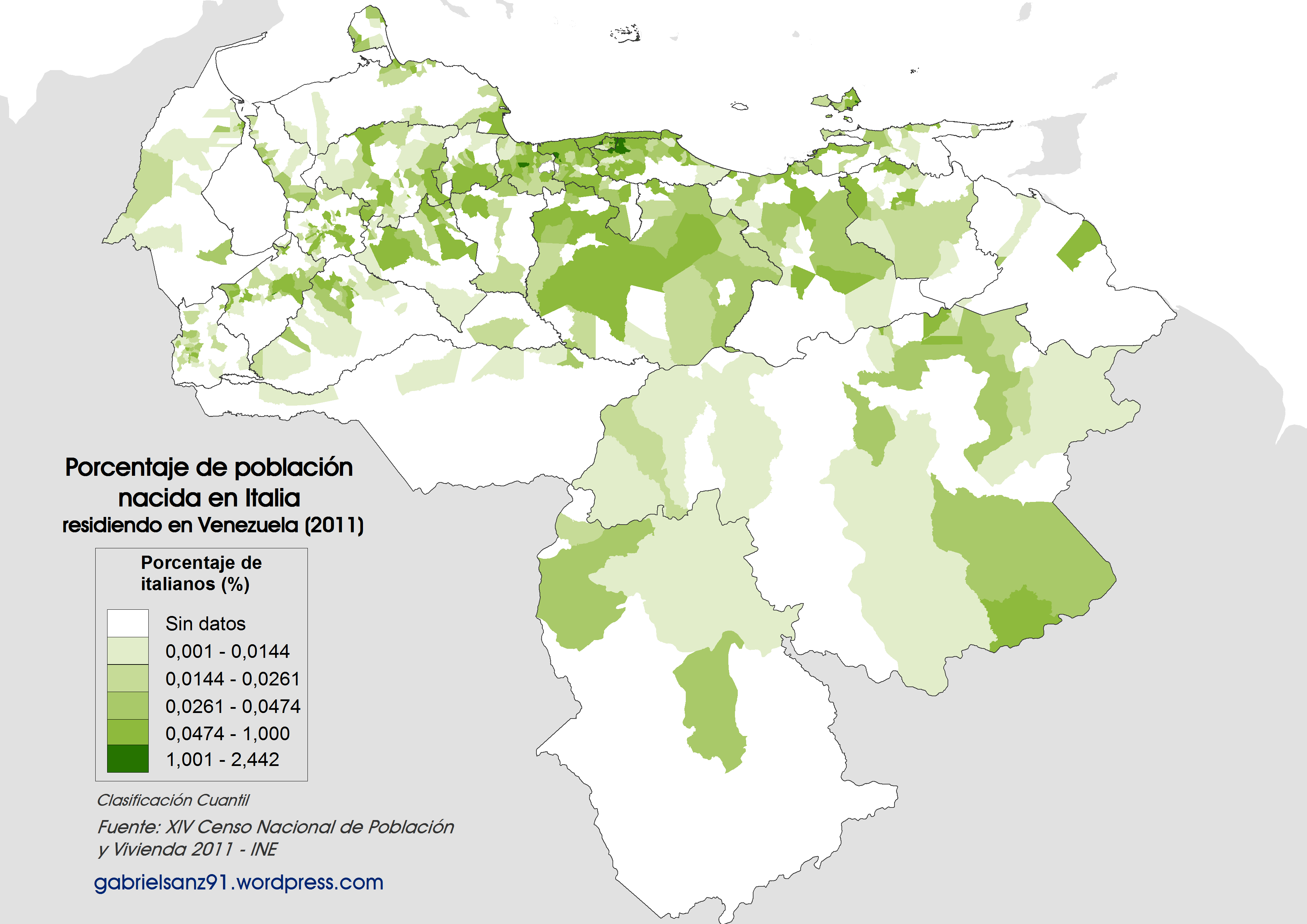
Communities (parroquias) of Venezuela where the Italians are concentrated (darker green shade indicates higher concentration)

Italian language instruction is increasing among the nearly one million Venezuelans who are of Italian descent, but there are only a few Italian-language institutions in Venezuela, including private schools owned by the Italian community. In the metropolitan area of Caracas, the best school is the Agustin Codazzi (with courses from elementary to high school), while there are others in the interior of Venezuela (such as Colegio Angelo De Marta in Puerto La Cruz and Colegio Agazzi in Barquisimeto).

According to the Italian Embassy in Caracas:

...Italian language teaching is guaranteed by the presence of a consistent number of private Venezuelan schools and institutions, where Italian language courses and Italian literature are active. Other similar courses are organized and sponsored by the Italian Ministry of Foreign Affairs and Regional Associations. The Didactic Office of the General Consulate of Caracas, together with this Embassy, is negotiating an Agreement with the Venezuelan Authorities for the recognition of the Study Diplomas emitted by the Italian School so that there can be access to the University system in Venezuela with an Italian high school diploma. Since 2002, the Italian Government has become the promoter for a provision which makes it mandatory to teach Italian as a second language in a consistent number of public and private schools within Venezuela...

== List of some Italian words in Venezuelan Spanish ==
- Balurdo. Strange kind of stupid. From balordo.
- Barco. From barca 'boat'.
- Birra. 'Beer'. From birra.
- Calarse. 'To digest (or sustain) something bad'. From calarsi with the same meaning.
- Chao. From ciao.
- Comadre. 'Godmother'. From comare.
- Compadre. 'Godfather' (and even 'special friend'). From compare.
- Contorno. 'Side dish'. From contorno.
- Cretino. 'Stupid'. From cretino.
- Gafo. 'Stupid'. From cafone ('low-class peasant').
- Lasaña. From lasagna, a food made with pasta and meat.
- Macho. 'Strong man'. From the Italian maschio.
- Malandro. 'Thug'. From the Italian malandrino.
- Milanesa. From milanese, a food made with meat and bread.
- Mezanina. Building. From mezzanina (intermediate floor in a building. Normally between ground floor and first floor).
- Mortadela. From mortadella, a large sausage made from pork and chicken.
- Paisano. From paesano, an Italian (or southern European) immigrant
- Paneton. From panettone, an Italian Christmas bread
- Pasticho. From pasticcio, a lasagna.
- Piccina/piccino. 'Little one, young child' in Italian. Term of endearment.
- Pico. Geographical term meaning 'top of a mountain'. From picco.
- Piñata. From pignatta, a bowl.
- Pizza'. From pizza.
- Radio. From radio.
- Terraza. 'Balcony'. From terrazza.

== See also ==
- Italy–Venezuela relations
- Italo-Venezuelans
- Italianism
- List of Spanish words borrowed from Italian
- Venezuelan Spanish

== Bibliography ==
- Guido Gómez de Silva, Guido. Breve diccionario etimológico de la lengua española Madrid. ISBN 968-16-2812-8
- Santander Laya-Garrido, Alfonso. Los Italianos forjadores de la nacionalidad y del desarrollo economico en Venezuela. Editorial Vadell. Valencia, 1978.
- Vannini, Marisa. Italia y los Italianos en la Historia y en la Cultura de Venezuela. Oficina Central de Información. Caracas, 1966
