= 1968 Campeonato Brasileiro Série A (Torneio Roberto Gomes Pedrosa) =

Campeonato Brasileiro Série A
- Season: 1968
- Dates: 24 August - 10 December
- Champions: Santos (6th title)
- Matches: 142
- Goals: 361 (2.54 per match)
- Top goalscorer: Toninho (18 goals)
- Total attendance: 2,520,358
- Average attendance: 17,749

The 1968 Campeonato Brasileiro Série A (officially the 1968 Torneio Roberto Gomes Pedrosa) was the 13th edition of the Campeonato Brasileiro Série A. It began on August 24 and ended on December 10. Santos won the championship, the 6th national title of the club at 9 years of tournament contention. Pelé won the title with Santos, which was the 6th and last Brazilian title he conquered.

== Championship format ==
- First-phase: the 17 participants play all against all twice, but divided into two groups (one 8 and one 9) for classification, in the Group A, each team plays two more matches against any other. The first 2 of each group are classified for the finals.
- Final-phase: the four clubs classified play all against all in a single round. The club with most points at this stage is the champion.
- Tie-breaking criteria:

1 - Goal difference
2 - Raffle

- With one victory, a team still gained 2 points, instead of 3.

== First phase ==
=== Group A ===
Pos	Team	Pld	W	D	L	GF	GA	GD	Pts
1	Palmeiras	16	9	6	1	24	9	+15	24
2	Internacional	16	7	6	3	20	15	+5	20
3	Corinthians	16	10	0	6	23	20	+3	20
4	Cruzeiro	16	6	5	5	22	18	+4	17
5	Atlético-PR	16	6	5	5	28	25	+3	17
6	Bangu	16	3	8	5	12	17	−5	14
7	Botafogo	16	4	5	7	17	22	−5	13
8	Flamengo	16	2	7	7	10	21	−11	11
9	Náutico	16	2	4	10	12	25	−13	8

=== Group B ===
Pos	Team	Pld	W	D	L	GF	GA	GD	Pts
1	Santos	16	9	4	3	37	18	+19	22
2	Vasco	16	9	2	5	27	22	+5	20
3	Grêmio	16	6	7	3	17	11	+6	19
4	Atlético Mineiro	16	7	5	4	18	15	+3	19
5	São Paulo	16	4	6	6	23	24	−1	14
6	Fluminense	16	6	1	9	19	23	−4	13
7	Portuguesa	16	3	5	8	18	29	−11	11
8	Bahia	16	4	2	10	14	27	−13	10

== Final phase ==
Pos	Team	Pld	W	D	L	GF	GA	GD	Pts
1	Santos	3	3	0	0	7	2	+5	6
2	Internacional	3	1	0	2	6	5	+1	2
3	Vasco da Gama	3	1	0	2	4	7	−3	2
4	Palmeiras	3	1	0	2	3	6	−3	2

Matches:

4 December 1968
16:00 UTC−03:00

Palmeiras	3 – 0	Vasco da Gama
Buglê 61' (o.g.); Artime 64', 84'	Report

Morumbi, São Paulo
Attendance: 6,295
Referee: Armando Marques

4 December 1968
16:00 UTC−03:00

Internacional	1 – 2	Santos
Élton 36'	Report	Pelé 32'; Carlos Alberto 88' (pen.)

Olímpico, Porto Alegre
Attendance: 30,424
Referee: Roberto Goycochea

8 December 1968
16:00 UTC−03:00

Vasco da Gama	3 – 2	Internacional
Walfrido 24'; Danilo Menezes 72'; Nado 77'	Report	Claudiomiro 80'; Tovar 87'

Maracanã, Rio de Janeiro
Attendance: 40,975
Referee: Arnaldo Cézar Coelho

8 December 1968
16:00 UTC−03:00

Santos	3 – 0	Palmeiras
Abel 14'; Edu 81'; Toninho 88'	Report

Morumbi, São Paulo
Attendance: 36,278
Referee: Armando Marques

10 December 1968
16:00 UTC−03:00

Vasco da Gama	1 – 2	Santos
Bianchini 61'	Report	Toninho 14'; Pelé 38'

Maracanã, Rio de Janeiro
Attendance: 54,994
Referee: Arnaldo Cézar Coelho

10 December 1968
16:00 UTC−03:00

Internacional	3 – 0	Palmeiras
Claudiomiro 48', 78'; Ferrari 57' (o.g.)	Report

Olímpico, Porto Alegre
Attendance: 7,400
Referee: Armando Marques

Torneio Roberto Gomes Pedrosa (Série A)
1968 champions

6th title
