= 1979 Campeonato Brasileiro Série A =

Campeonato Brasileiro Série A
- Season: 1979
- Champions: Internacional (3rd title)
- Copa Libertadores de América: Internacional; Vasco da Gama
- Matches: 583
- Goals: 1,366 (2.34 per match)
- Top goalscorer: César (América-RJ) - 13 goals
- Biggest home win: Fluminense 6–0 Maranhão (November 29, 1979)
- Biggest away win: Operário-MS 0–5 Santa Cruz (October 28, 1979)
- Highest scoring: Londrina 6–2 Santa Cruz (November 15, 1979)
- Longest unbeaten run: Internacional (23 matches)
- Average attendance: 9,105

The 1979 Campeonato Brasileiro Série A, (officially the V Copa Brasil) was the 24th edition of the Campeonato Brasileiro Série A.

== Overview ==
In the First phase, 80 clubs were divided into 8 groups of 10 clubs.in the groups A, B, C, D, E and F, the four first clubs qualified to the Second phase, while in the groups G and H, eight clubs qualified.

An edition of the Rio-São Paulo tournament was slated to happen in 1979 (it never came to fruition), and because of that, six clubs from Rio de Janeiro (Botafogo, Vasco da Gama, Goytacaz, Americano, Fluminense and Flamengo) and ten from São Paulo (Corinthians, Santos, Portuguesa, São Paulo, Francana, São Bento, XV de Piracicaba, XV de Jaú, Inter de Limeira and Comercial-SP) were to enter in the Second phase, joining the 40 teams that had qualified in the First phase. These teams would be divided in 7 groups of 8 teams, in which the two top-placed teams in each group qualified to the Third phase.

In the Third phase, the 14 qualified teams joined Guarani and Palmeiras, finalists of the previous year's championship, and were divided into four groups of four teams, in which the first-placed teams in each group qualified to the semifinals.

However, Corinthians, Portuguesa, Santos and São Paulo demanded to enter only in the third phase instead of the second. When CBD refused, the four teams withdrew from the championship. In order to replace them in the second phase, four berths were opened to the four best teams out of the 40 teams that had been eliminated in the first phase.

Internacional won the championship undefeated, becoming the only team to win the Campeonato Brasileiro Série A in this way.

== First phase ==
=== Group A ===
Home \ Away	ANA	AVA	COL	CON	GON	JOI	JUV	LON	NHA	SER
Anapolina		2–1		4–0	2–1	1–0				2–0
Avaí			0–1	1–1				1–1		0–2
Colorado	3–2			1–1	2–0	1–0		1–2		
Confiança					0–1	1–3		2–1	1–0	0–2
Goiânia		1–1					2–1	0–1		1–1
Joinville		3–2			0–0		2–1	0–0	3–0	
Juventude	2–0	2–2	0–0	2–1						2–0
Londrina	1–0						1–1		1–0	2–2
Novo Hamburgo	1–0	1–1	0–0		1–0		1–1			
Sergipe			1–1			2–1			0–0	

Legend: Blue = home team win; Yellow = draw; Red = away team win.

Pos	Team	Pld	W	D	L	GF	GA	GD	Pts
1	(Paraná (state)) Londrina	9	4	4	1	10	7	+3	12
2	(Paraná (state)) Colorado	9	4	4	1	10	6	+4	12
3	(Goiás) Anapolina	9	5	0	4	13	9	+4	10
4	(Santa Catarina (state)) Joinville	9	4	2	3	12	8	+4	10
5	(Rio Grande do Sul) Juventude	9	3	4	2	12	9	+3	10
6	Sergipe	9	3	4	2	10	9	+1	10
7	(Rio Grande do Sul) Novo Hamburgo	9	2	4	3	4	7	−3	8
8	(Goiás) Goiânia	9	2	3	4	6	9	−3	7
9	(Sergipe) Confiança	9	2	2	5	7	15	−8	6
10	(Santa Catarina (state)) Avaí	9	0	5	4	9	14	−5	5

=== Group B ===
Home \ Away	BRP	CAL	CAX	CHA	CLT	CRI	DES	GRM	OP-PR	SP-RS
Brasil de Pelotas		2–0				3–0	1–1	0–0		
Caldense				2–0	3–0				1–0	1–0
Caxias	0–0	0–1		5–1					3–0	
Chapecoense	1–1					0–1		2–3		1–2
Colatina	0–0		0–1	1–1			0–0			0–1
Criciúma		2–0	0–0		0–1				4–0	2–1
Desportiva		2–0	2–1	0–0		1–0			2–0	
Grêmio Maringá		3–2	0–0		2–0	2–0	2–0			
Operário-PR	1–1			1–0	1–0			0–2		
São Paulo-RS	1–1		2–1				1–2	1–1	0–1 (Note: Match suspended at 85 minutes, since Operário-PR found itself with only five players after six players had already been sent off. São Paulo eventually won the points.)	

Legend: Blue = home team win; Yellow = draw; Red = away team win.
Notes:

Pos	Team	Pld	W	D	L	GF	GA	GD	Pts
1	(Paraná (state)) Grêmio Maringá	9	6	3	0	15	5	+10	15
2	(Espírito Santo) Desportiva	9	5	3	1	10	5	+5	13
3	(Rio Grande do Sul) Brasil de Pelotas	9	2	7	0	9	4	+5	11
4	(Minas Gerais) Caldense	9	5	0	4	10	9	+1	10
5	(Rio Grande do Sul) São Paulo-RS	9	4	2	3	9	9	0	10
6	(Santa Catarina (state)) Criciúma	9	4	1	4	9	8	+1	9
7	(Rio Grande do Sul) Caxias	9	3	3	3	11	6	+5	9
8	(Paraná (state)) Operário-PR	9	2	1	6	3	13	−10	5
9	(Espírito Santo) Colatina	9	1	3	5	2	9	−7	5
10	(Santa Catarina (state)) Chapecoense	9	0	3	6	6	16	−10	3

=== Group C ===
Home \ Away	AT-GO	BRA	CO-MS	FL-BA	GAM	GUA	ITA	ITU	MIX	OP-MT
Atlético-GO		2–1	4–1			3–0		3–2		2–2
Brasília			2–2			1–0	3–2		2–1	
Comercial-MS				2–0	3–1	– (Note: Guará did not play its last match against Comercial-MS)		3–1	2–0	0–1
Fluminense-BA	1–0	1–0			0–0	1–1		1–0		
Gama	4–3	4–1				2–0	1–0		2–1	
Guará										0–1
Itabuna	1–0		1–1	1–0		0–0			0–1	
Itumbiara		2–1			1–0	3–1	1–1			1–0
Mixto	2–0			1–1		3–0		1–0		4–3
Operário-MT		3–0		1–0	0–0		1–4			

Legend: Blue = home team win; Yellow = draw; Red = away team win.
Notes:

Pos	Team	Pld	W	D	L	GF	GA	GD	Pts
1	(Federal District (Brazil)) Gama	9	5	2	2	14	9	+5	12
2	(Mato Grosso) Mixto	9	5	1	3	14	10	+4	11
3	(Mato Grosso do Sul) Comercial-MS	8	4	2	2	14	10	+4	10
4	(Mato Grosso) Operário-MT	9	4	2	3	12	11	+1	10
5	(Goiás) Atlético-GO	9	4	1	4	17	14	+3	9
6	(Goiás) Itumbiara	9	4	1	4	11	11	0	9
7	(Bahia) Itabuna	9	3	3	3	10	8	+2	9
8	(Bahia) Fluminense de Feira	9	3	3	3	5	6	−1	9
9	(Federal District (Brazil)) Brasília	9	3	1	5	11	17	−6	7
10	(Federal District (Brazil)) Guará	8	0	2	6	2	14	−12	2

=== Group D ===
Home \ Away	AM-MG	BO-PB	CAM	CAG	FAS	PAY	RNE	TRE	TUL	VLL
América-MG		3–0				2–0	3–2	2–1		0–0
Botafogo-PB			2–0	2–0	3–0			0–1		4–2
Campinense	0–1				3–0		2–0	1–0	1–0	
Campo Grande	1–0		1–0		0–0	2–1			3–0	
Fast	1–3					1–1	3–1		3–2	0–1
Paysandu		4–2	0–1				1–2	2–2	1–0	
Rio Negro		0–0		0–0					1–4	0–1
Treze				2–0	6–1		3–1			
Tuna Luso	2–1	2–2						2–0		0–1
Villa Nova			0–0	1–2		2–0		1–0		

Legend: Blue = home team win; Yellow = draw; Red = away team win.

Pos	Team	Pld	W	D	L	GF	GA	GD	Pts
1	(Minas Gerais) América-MG	9	6	1	2	15	7	+8	13
2	(Rio de Janeiro (state)) Campo Grande	9	5	2	2	9	6	+3	12
3	(Minas Gerais) Villa Nova	9	5	2	2	9	6	+3	12
4	(Paraíba) Campinense	9	5	1	3	8	4	+4	11
5	(Paraíba) Botafogo-PB	9	4	2	3	15	12	+3	10
6	(Paraíba) Treze	9	4	1	4	15	10	+5	9
7	(Pará) Tuna Luso	9	3	1	5	12	13	−1	7
8	(Amazonas (Brazilian state)) Fast	9	2	2	5	9	20	−11	6
9	(Pará) Paysandu	9	2	2	5	10	14	−4	6
10	(Amazonas (Brazilian state)) Rio Negro	9	1	2	6	7	17	−10	4

=== Group E ===
Home \ Away	CE-PE	MAR	MOT	NÁU	PIA	RÍV	SAM	TIR	UBR	UBL
Central-PE		2–2				1–0	2–0	1–1		2–0
Maranhão			3–0		1–1	1–0	3–0			1–1
Moto Club	2–1							1–0	2–0	
Náutico	1–1	2–3	1–0		2–2		2–0		0–1	
Piauí	0–2		0–0					2–2		0–0
Ríver			2–1	3–1	1–1				1–2	
Sampaio Corrêa			1–0		4–2	0–0			2–0	
Tiradentes		0–3		0–1		3–1	1–1			
Uberaba	2–1	0–1			3–0			2–0		3–1
Uberlândia			2–0	0–1		2–1	4–1	4–0		

Legend: Blue = home team win; Yellow = draw; Red = away team win.

Pos	Team	Pld	W	D	L	GF	GA	GD	Pts
1	Maranhão	9	6	3	0	18	6	+12	15
2	(Minas Gerais) Uberaba	9	7	0	2	15	6	+9	14
3	(Pernambuco) Central	9	4	3	2	13	8	+5	11
4	(Minas Gerais) Uberlândia	9	4	2	3	14	9	+5	10
5	(Pernambuco) Náutico	9	4	2	3	11	10	+1	10
6	(Maranhão) Moto Club	9	3	1	5	6	10	−4	7
7	(Maranhão) Sampaio Corrêa	9	3	1	5	7	16	−9	6 (Note: 1 point deducted?)
8	(Piauí) River	9	2	2	5	9	12	−3	6
9	Piauí	9	0	6	3	8	15	−7	6
10	(Piauí) Tiradentes	9	1	3	5	7	16	−9	5

=== Group F ===
Home \ Away	ABC	AM-RN	ASA	CRB	CSA	FER	FOR	ITA	LEÔ	POT
ABC		1–0	1–2	4–2			1–0	1–1		
América-RN			2–0		2–1	0–0				
ASA				1–1		0–2	2–0	1–0	2–1	
CRB		1–0							1–0	3–0
CSA	3–1		2–1	1–0			3–0		2–1	
Ferroviário	0–3			0–0	1–1			1–1		
Fortaleza		3–1		0–0		0–0			3–1	0–1
Itabaiana		1–0		2–0	2–1		3–1			0–0
Leônico	1–0	4–0				1–0		1–0		2–0
Potiguar	1–1	1–0	1–2		0–0	1–2				

Legend: Blue = home team win; Yellow = draw; Red = away team win.

Pos	Team	Pld	W	D	L	GF	GA	GD	Pts
1	(Alagoas) CSA	9	5	2	2	14	8	+6	12
2	(Alagoas) ASA	9	5	1	3	11	10	+1	11
3	(Sergipe) Itabaiana	9	4	3	2	10	6	+4	11
4	(Bahia) Leônico	9	5	0	4	12	8	+4	10
5	(Rio Grande do Norte) ABC	9	4	2	3	13	10	+3	10
6	(Alagoas) CRB	9	3	3	3	8	8	0	9
7	(Ceará) Ferroviário-CE	9	2	5	2	6	7	−1	9
8	(Rio Grande do Norte) Potiguar	9	2	3	4	5	10	−5	7
9	(Ceará) Fortaleza	9	2	2	5	7	12	−5	6
10	(Rio Grande do Norte) América-RN	9	2	1	6	5	12	−7	5

=== Group G ===
Home \ Away	AM-RJ	AT-PR	COR	GRÊ	FIG	INT	OP-MS	RB-ES	SCR	SPO
América-RJ		1–3	3–0		1–0		3–0	3–1		
Atlético-PR				1–0		0–0	0–2		0–1	
Coritiba		1–1			1–0	0–3		1–1		2–0
Grêmio	1–3		4–1						1–0	4–0
Figueirense		1–0		2–1			0–0		1–1	
Internacional	1–1			1–0	1–0		2–2	5–1		
Operário-MS			2–0	0–3				4–0	0–5	1–0
Rio Branco-ES		1–1		0–0	1–1					2–0
Santa Cruz	1–0		0–0			1–2		3–3		0–1
Sport	0–2	2–2			2–2	0–3				

Legend: Blue = home team win; Yellow = draw; Red = away team win.

Pos	Team	Pld	W	D	L	GF	GA	GD	Pts
1	(Rio Grande do Sul) Internacional	9	6	3	0	18	5	+13	15
2	(Rio de Janeiro (state)) América-RJ	9	6	1	2	17	7	+10	13
3	(Mato Grosso do Sul) Operário-MS	9	4	2	3	11	13	−2	10
4	(Rio Grande do Sul) Grêmio	9	4	1	4	14	8	+6	9
5	(Pernambuco) Santa Cruz	9	3	3	3	12	8	+4	9
6	(Paraná (state)) Atlético-PR	9	2	4	3	8	9	−1	8
7	(Santa Catarina (state)) Figueirense	9	2	4	3	7	8	−1	8
8	(Paraná (state)) Coritiba	9	2	3	4	6	14	−8	7
9	(Espírito Santo) Rio Branco-ES	9	1	5	3	10	18	−8	7
10	(Pernambuco) Sport	9	1	2	6	5	18	−13	4

=== Group H ===
Home \ Away	AT-MG	BAH	CEA	CRU	DBO	GOI	NA-AM	REM	VIL	VIT
Atlético Mineiro			3–1	1–1		0–0			0–0	1–1
Bahia	0–1				2–1	1–0		1–0		1–2
Ceará		3–1		1–1		0–2		4–1	2–4	
Cruzeiro		5–0			1–1		4–1	3–0		
Dom Bosco	1–1		2–5			0–1	2–1			
Goiás				3–1			2–0			1–0
Nacional-AM	0–0	1–0	1–1						2–4	0–0
Remo	2–2				1–2	1–0	3–0			1–2
Vila Nova		0–0		0–1	1–1	2–1		2–1		
Vitória			4–1	2–4	0–2				0–0	

Legend: Blue = home team win; Yellow = draw; Red = away team win.

Pos	Team	Pld	W	D	L	GF	GA	GD	Pts
1	(Minas Gerais) Cruzeiro	9	5	3	1	21	9	+12	13
2	(Goiás) Vila Nova	9	4	4	1	13	8	+5	12
3	Goiás	9	5	1	3	10	5	+5	11
4	(Minas Gerais) Atlético Mineiro	9	2	7	0	9	6	+3	11
5	(Mato Grosso) Dom Bosco	9	3	3	3	12	13	−1	9
6	Ceará	9	3	2	4	18	19	−1	8
7	(Bahia) Vitória	9	2	4	3	10	11	−1	8
8	Bahia	9	3	1	5	6	13	−7	7
9	(Pará) Remo	9	2	2	5	10	15	−5	6
10	(Amazonas (Brazilian state)) Nacional-AM	9	1	3	5	6	16	−10	5

== Second phase ==
=== Group I ===
Pos	Team	Pld	W	D	L	GF	GA	GD	Pts
1	(Paraná (state)) Coritiba	7	5	1	1	11	3	+8	11
2	(Minas Gerais) Atlético Mineiro	7	4	2	1	9	5	+4	10
3	(Paraíba) Campinense	7	3	2	2	6	4	+2	8
4	(São Paulo (state)) Francana	7	3	1	3	7	9	−2	7
5	(Rio de Janeiro (state)) América-RJ	7	2	2	3	14	9	+5	6
6	(Rio Grande do Sul) Brasil de Pelotas	7	2	2	3	8	8	0	6
7	(Paraná (state)) Colorado	7	2	1	4	9	11	−2	5
8	(Mato Grosso) Mixto	7	1	1	5	4	19	−15	3

=== Group J ===
Pos	Team	Pld	W	D	L	GF	GA	GD	Pts
1	(Mato Grosso do Sul) Operário-MS	7	5	2	0	16	5	+11	12
2	(São Paulo (state)) São Bento	7	4	1	2	11	12	−1	9
3	(Rio de Janeiro (state)) Botafogo	7	3	3	1	9	4	+5	9
4	(Santa Catarina (state)) Joinville	7	3	2	2	8	9	−1	8
5	(Santa Catarina (state)) Figueirense	6	1	4	1	4	4	0	6
6	(Mato Grosso do Sul) Comercial-MS	7	2	1	4	4	8	−4	5
7	(Paraná (state)) Grêmio Maringá	6	1	1	4	4	9	−5	3
8	(Rio Grande do Norte) ABC	5	0	0	5	3	8	−5	0

Notes:

ABC withdrew from its last two matches against Grêmio Maringá and Figueirense

=== Group K ===
Pos	Team	Pld	W	D	L	GF	GA	GD	Pts
1	(Rio Grande do Sul) Internacional	7	4	3	0	10	2	+8	11
2	(Paraná (state)) Atlético-PR	7	4	2	1	6	2	+4	10
3	(Espírito Santo) Desportiva	7	4	1	2	10	8	+2	9
4	(São Paulo (state)) Internacional de Limeira	7	2	4	1	7	4	+3	8
5	(Minas Gerais) Caldense	7	2	3	2	5	6	−1	7
6	(Rio Grande do Sul) São Paulo-RS	7	1	3	3	4	10	−6	5
7	(Goiás) Anapolina	7	1	2	4	5	10	−5	4
8	(Rio de Janeiro (state)) Goytacaz	7	1	0	6	3	8	−5	2

=== Group L ===
Pos	Team	Pld	W	D	L	GF	GA	GD	Pts
1	(Rio de Janeiro (state)) Flamengo	7	5	2	0	14	2	+12	12
2	(São Paulo (state)) XV de Piracicaba	7	5	0	2	15	8	+7	10
3	(Rio Grande do Sul) Grêmio	7	5	0	2	9	5	+4	10
4	(Paraná (state)) Londrina	7	4	1	2	15	8	+7	9
5	(Pernambuco) Santa Cruz	7	3	1	3	8	10	−2	7
6	Bahia	7	2	0	5	4	11	−7	4
7	(Pernambuco) Náutico	7	1	1	5	6	13	−7	3
8	(Federal District (Brazil)) Gama	7	0	1	6	4	18	−14	1

=== Group M ===
Pos	Team	Pld	W	D	L	GF	GA	GD	Pts
1	(Rio de Janeiro (state)) Vasco da Gama	7	5	2	0	13	1	+12	12
2	Goiás	7	4	3	0	12	3	+9	11
3	(Minas Gerais) América-MG	7	2	4	1	6	5	+1	8
4	Ceará	7	2	2	3	9	8	+1	6
5	(Mato Grosso) Operário-MT	7	1	4	2	7	12	−5	6
6	(Paraíba) Botafogo-PB	7	2	1	4	8	13	−5	5
7	(Pernambuco) Central	7	1	2	4	6	8	−2	4
8	(Alagoas) ASA	7	1	2	4	7	18	−11	4

=== Group N ===
Pos	Team	Pld	W	D	L	GF	GA	GD	Pts
1	(Bahia) Vitória	7	5	0	2	12	7	+5	10
2	(Minas Gerais) Uberlândia	7	4	2	1	8	5	+3	10
3	(Rio de Janeiro (state)) Fluminense	7	3	4	0	18	6	+12	10
4	(Goiás) Vila Nova	7	2	5	0	6	3	+3	9
5	(Rio de Janeiro (state)) Campo Grande	7	2	2	3	10	7	+3	6
6	(São Paulo (state)) XV de Jaú	7	2	2	3	8	10	−2	6
7	Maranhão	7	2	0	5	3	15	−12	4
8	(Sergipe) Itabaiana	7	0	1	6	4	16	−12	1

=== Group O ===
Pos	Team	Pld	W	D	L	GF	GA	GD	Pts
1	(Minas Gerais) Cruzeiro	7	5	1	1	19	8	+11	11
2	(São Paulo (state)) Comercial-SP	7	4	1	2	8	6	+2	9
3	(Minas Gerais) Uberaba	7	3	2	2	7	5	+2	8
4	(Alagoas) CSA	7	3	1	3	5	6	−1	7
5	(Mato Grosso) Dom Bosco	7	3	0	4	8	11	−3	6
6	(Rio de Janeiro (state)) Americano	7	2	2	3	8	11	−3	6
7	(Bahia) Leônico	7	1	3	3	9	9	0	5
8	(Minas Gerais) Villa Nova	7	2	0	5	6	14	−8	4

== Third phase ==
=== Group P ===
Pos	Team	Pld	W	D	L	GF	GA	GD	Pts
1	(Paraná (state)) Coritiba	3	2	1	0	5	0	+5	5
2	(Bahia) Vitória	3	2	0	1	6	5	+1	4
3	(São Paulo (state)) Guarani	3	1	1	1	2	3	−1	3
4	(São Paulo (state)) XV de Piracicaba	3	0	0	3	1	6	−5	0

=== Group R ===
Pos	Team	Pld	W	D	L	GF	GA	GD	Pts
1	(São Paulo (state)) Palmeiras	3	3	0	0	13	2	+11	6
2	(Rio de Janeiro (state)) Flamengo	3	2	0	1	7	4	+3	4
3	(São Paulo (state)) Comercial-SP	3	0	1	2	3	9	−6	1
4	(São Paulo (state)) São Bento	3	0	1	2	2	10	−8	1

=== Group S ===
Pos	Team	Pld	W	D	L	GF	GA	GD	Pts
1	(Rio Grande do Sul) Internacional	3	3	0	0	4	2	+2	6
2	Goiás	3	1	1	1	1	2	−1	3
3	(Minas Gerais) Cruzeiro	3	0	2	1	3	4	−1	2
4	(Minas Gerais) Atlético Mineiro	3	0	1	2	0	0	0	1

Notes:

Atlético Mineiro withdrew after the match against Cruzeiro, that ended in a 0-0 draw, and the points of the remaining matches were awarded to Goiás and Internacional.

=== Group T ===
Pos	Team	Pld	W	D	L	GF	GA	GD	Pts
1	(Rio de Janeiro (state)) Vasco da Gama	3	2	1	0	10	1	+9	5
2	(Mato Grosso do Sul) Operário-MS	3	2	0	1	4	4	0	4
3	(Minas Gerais) Uberlândia	3	0	2	1	3	10	−7	2
4	(Paraná (state)) Atlético-PR	3	0	1	2	3	5	−2	1

== Semi-finals ==
=== First leg ===
12 December 1979

Coritiba (Paraná (state))	1 – 1	(Rio de Janeiro (state)) Vasco da Gama
Luís Freire 85'		Catinha 20' (o.g.)

Couto Pereirao, Curitiba (PR)
Attendance: 50,582
Referee: (São Paulo (state)) José Favilli Neto

13 December 1979

Palmeiras (São Paulo (state))	2 – 3	(Rio Grande do Sul) Internacional
Baroninho 34'; Jorge Mendonça 55'		Jair 50'; Falcão 64', 70'

Morumbi, São Paulo (SP)
Attendance: 61,259
Referee: (Rio de Janeiro (state)) Wilson Carlos dos Santos

=== Second leg ===
16 December 1979

Vasco da Gama (Rio de Janeiro (state))	2 – 1	(Paraná (state)) Coritiba
Paulinho 4'; Roberto Dinamite 36'		Gardel 22'

Estádio do Maracanã, Rio de Janeiro (RJ)
Attendance: 61,483
Referee: (São Paulo (state)) Roberto Nunes Morgado

16 December 1979

Internacional (Rio Grande do Sul)	1 – 1	(São Paulo (state)) Palmeiras
Jair 48'		Mococa 52'

Beira-Rio, Porto Alegre (RS)
Attendance: 69,575
Referee: (Rio de Janeiro (state)) José Roberto Wright

== Finals ==
=== First leg ===
20 December 1979

Vasco da Gama (Rio de Janeiro (state))	0 – 2	(Rio Grande do Sul) Internacional
		Spina 28', 55'

Estádio do Maracanã, Rio de Janeiro (RJ)
Attendance: 58,655
Referee: (São Paulo (state)) Oscar Scolfaro

=== Second leg ===
23 December 1979

Internacional (Rio Grande do Sul)	2 – 1	(Rio de Janeiro (state)) Vasco da Gama
Jair 41'; Falcão 58'		Wilsinho 84'

Beira-Rio, Porto Alegre (RS)
Attendance: 54,659
Referee: (São Paulo (state)) José Favilli Neto

== Final standings ==
Pos	Team	Pld	W	D	L	GF	GA	GD	Pts
1	Internacional	23	16	7	0	40	13	+27	39
2	Vasco da Gama	14	8	4	2	27	8	+19	20
3	Coritiba	21	9	6	6	24	20	+4	24
4	Palmeiras	5	3	1	1	16	6	+10	7
5	Operário-MS	19	11	4	4	31	22	+9	26
6	Cruzeiro	19	10	6	3	43	21	+22	26
7	Goiás	19	10	5	4	23	10	+13	25
8	Vitória	19	9	4	6	28	23	+5	22
9	Uberlândia	19	8	6	5	25	24	+1	22
10	Atlético Mineiro	19	6	10	3	18	11	+7	22
11	Atlético Paranaense	19	6	7	6	17	16	+1	19
12	Flamengo	10	7	2	1	21	6	+15	16
13	XV de Piracicaba	10	5	0	5	16	14	+2	10
14	Comercial-SP	10	4	2	4	11	15	−4	10
15	São Bento	10	4	2	4	13	22	−9	10
16	Guarani	3	1	1	1	2	3	−1	3
17	Uberaba	16	10	2	4	22	11	+11	22
18	Desportiva Capixaba	16	9	4	3	20	13	+7	22
19	Londrina	16	8	5	3	25	15	+10	21
20	América Mineiro	16	8	5	3	21	12	+9	21
21	Vila Nova-GO	16	6	9	1	19	11	+8	21
22	Grêmio	16	9	1	6	23	13	+10	19
23	América-RJ	16	8	3	5	31	16	+15	19
24	Campinense	16	8	3	5	14	8	+6	19
25	CSA	16	8	3	5	19	14	+5	19
26	Maranhão	16	8	3	5	21	21	0	19
27	Campo Grande	16	7	4	5	19	13	+6	18
28	Grêmio Maringá	15	7	4	4	19	14	+5	18
29	Joinville	16	7	4	5	20	17	+3	18
30	Caldense	16	7	3	6	15	15	0	17
31	Colorado	16	6	5	5	19	17	+2	17
32	Brasil-Pel	16	4	9	3	17	12	+5	17
33	Villa Nova-MG	16	7	2	7	15	20	−5	16
34	Santa Cruz	16	6	4	6	20	18	+2	16
35	Operário-MT	16	5	6	5	19	23	−4	16
36	Leônico	16	6	3	7	21	17	+4	15
37	Comercial-MS	15	6	3	6	18	18	0	15
38	Botafogo-PB	16	6	3	7	23	25	−2	15
39	Dom Bosco	16	6	3	7	20	24	−4	15
40	ASA	16	6	3	7	18	28	−10	15
41	Central	16	5	5	6	19	16	+3	15
42	São Paulo-RS	16	5	5	6	13	19	−6	15
43	Anapolina	16	6	2	8	18	19	−1	14
44	Mixto	16	6	2	8	18	29	−11	14
45	Ceará	16	5	4	7	27	27	0	14
46	Figueirense	15	3	8	4	11	12	−1	14
47	Náutico	16	5	3	8	17	23	−6	13
48	Gama	16	5	3	8	18	27	−9	13
49	Itabaiana	16	4	4	8	14	22	−8	12
50	Bahia	16	5	1	10	10	24	−14	11
51	ABC	14	4	2	8	16	18	−2	10
52	Fluminense	7	3	4	0	18	6	+12	10
53	Botafogo	7	3	3	1	9	4	+5	9
54	Internacional-SP	7	2	4	1	7	4	+3	8
55	Francana	7	3	1	3	7	9	−2	7
56	XV de Jaú	7	2	2	3	8	10	−2	6
57	Americano	7	2	2	3	8	11	−3	6
58	Goytacaz	7	1	0	6	3	8	−5	2
59	Rio Branco	9	1	5	3	10	18	−8	7
60	Remo	9	2	2	5	10	15	−5	6
61	Nacional	9	1	3	5	6	16	−10	5
62	Sport	9	1	2	6	5	18	−13	4
63	Juventude	9	3	4	2	12	9	+3	10
64	Sergipe	9	3	4	2	10	9	+1	10
65	Treze	9	4	1	4	15	10	+5	9
66	Atlético-GO	9	4	1	4	17	14	+3	9
67	Criciúma	9	4	1	4	9	8	+1	9
68	Itumbiara	9	4	1	4	11	11	0	9
69	Caxias	9	3	3	3	11	6	+5	9
70	Itabuna	9	3	3	3	10	8	+2	9
71	CRB	9	3	3	3	8	8	0	9
72	Fluminense-BA	9	3	3	3	5	6	−1	9
73	Ferroviário-CE	9	2	5	2	6	7	−1	9
74	Novo Hamburgo	9	2	4	3	4	7	−3	8
75	Tuna Luso	9	3	1	5	12	13	−1	7
76	Moto Club	9	3	1	5	6	10	−4	7
77	Brasília	9	3	1	5	11	17	−6	7
78	Goiânia	9	2	3	4	6	9	−3	7
79	Potiguar	9	2	3	4	5	10	−5	7
80	Paysandu	9	2	2	5	10	14	−4	6
81	Fortaleza	9	2	2	5	7	12	−5	6
82	Confiança	9	2	2	5	7	15	−8	6
83	Sampaio Corrêa	9	2	2	5	7	16	−9	6
84	Fast	9	2	2	5	9	20	−11	6
85	River	9	1	4	4	9	12	−3	6
86	Piauí	9	0	6	3	8	15	−7	6
87	América-RN	9	2	1	6	5	12	−7	5
88	Operário-PR	9	2	1	6	3	13	−10	5
89	Colatina	9	1	3	5	2	9	−7	5
90	Tiradentes	9	1	3	5	7	16	−9	5
91	Avaí	9	0	5	4	9	14	−5	5
92	Rio Negro	9	1	2	6	7	17	−10	4
93	Chapecoense	9	0	3	6	6	16	−10	3
94	Guará	8	0	2	6	2	14	−12	2

Source: rsssf.com
