= Jair (footballer, born 1953) =

Brazilian footballer

Personal information
- Full name: Jair Gonçalves Prates
- Date of birth: 11 June 1953 (age 73)
- Place of birth: Porto Alegre, Rio Grande do Sul, Brazil
- Height: 1.79 m (5 ft 10 in)
- Position: Attacking midfielder

Senior career*
Years	Team	Apps	(Gls)
1974–1981	Internacional	165+	(40+)
1981	Cruzeiro	3+	
1982–1983	Peñarol	13+	(2)
1984	Juventus-SP		
1985–1986	Barcelona de Guayaquil		
1986	ABC		
1986	Huracán Buceo		
1988	Vitória		
1988–1989	Juventude		
1990	Lajeadense		
1991–1992	Huracán Buceo		

International career
1979	Brazil	1	(0)
- * Club domestic league appearances and goals

Jair Gonçalves Prates (born 11 June 1953), known as just Jair, is a Brazilian former footballer who played as an attacking midfielder.

Jair made 137 Campeonato Brasileiro appearances for Internacional.

== Biography ==
Son of footballer also Laerte Prates (known as Laertes III), Jair was born in Porto Alegre, but raised in Governador Island in Rio de Janeiro. Depending on the profession of his father, also lived in Bogotá and Barranquilla, returning to Porto Alegre in the late 1960.

== Career ==
Jair began his career in the basic categories of international, having played association football in Sogipa.

=== Tri-champion for Inter ===
In 1974, the formation of the great Inter team headed by Rubens Minelli, Jair was already booking team principal, who had players like Falcão, Figueroa and Carpeggiani.

In the victorious campaign of the Brasileiro 1975, it became a sort of "joker" and is often called to work during the games, at different positions in midfield and attack.

In 1976, the gaucho was octacampeão Inter. In Grenal key in the Olympic Stadium, Inter won 2-0 and the second goal was scored by Dario, completing a release of Jair. As Darius was known as "King Dada," the celebration of the goal led to Jair the nickname "Prince Jajá.

In bi-Brazilian championship 1976, Jair effectively participate in the campaign, playing in 22 of 23 games and scoring 8 goals.

But it was winning the tri-Brazilian championship undefeated in 1979, which Jair reached a peak of his career, playing as a right winger alongside Falcao, Batista and Mário Sérgio. It was the team's top scorer with nine goals, with the last of them in the end, the first goal in the 2–1 victory over the Vasco in Estádio Beira-Rio.

He played just one game for the Brazil squad in Copa América 1979.

=== Intercontinental Champion at Peñarol ===
In 1980, after the loss of final Libertadores to National to Montevideo, Jair was a few months on loan at Cruzeiro and was finally negotiated with Peñarol in exchange for the Uruguayan player Ruben Paz.

In Penharol, Jair won the championship titles Uruguay the champion of the Libertadores and the Intercontinental Cup 1982. In the decision of this tournament, against the Aston Villa of England, Jair scored the first goal of victory by 2-0 and was considered the best player on the field, winning a car as a prize Toyota hosted by the sponsor.

However, as a result of a quarrel with his colleagues, who hoped to split the prize among all, Jair did not play in 1983 (when the Peñarol lost the final of the Libertadores for the Grêmio) and was removed from the club in 1984.

=== End of career ===
After 30 years, Jair returned to Brazil to play for the Juventus of São Paulo, was in Ecuadorian football, passed by other teams in Brazil and ended his career at 39 years of age at Huracán Buceo.

Recently, along with other former gaúcho football players, like Escurinho Tovar Alcindo Ancheta and Tarciso, created a cooperative to teach football, with the support of the Municipality of Porto Alegre. Coordinator of the core of Restinga, Jair is responsible for about 350 boys between 7 and 18 years.

== Honours ==
Internacional

- Campeonato Gaúcho: 1974, 1975, 1976, 1978
- Campeonato Brasileiro Série A: 1975, 1976, 1979

Peñarol

- Primera División Uruguaya: 1982
- Copa Libertadores da América: 1982
- Intercontinental Cup: 1982

Barcelona de Guayaquil

- Ecuadorian Serie A: 1985
