= Claudiomiro =

Claudiomiro is a given name. It may refer to:

- Claudiomiro (footballer, 1950–2018), Claudiomiro Estrais Ferreira, Brazilian football forward
- Claudiomiro (footballer, born 1971), Claudiomiro Salenave Santiago, Brazilian football defender
