= Glasgow International Tournament =

- Founded: 1987
- Region: Europe
- Teams: 4
- Current champions: (Brazil) Internacional (1st title)
- Most championships: (Brazil) Internacional (1 title)

The Glasgow International Tournament was an invitational football tournament held at Ibrox Stadium Glasgow. The only edition took place between 1 and 2 August 1987. It was contested by four teams from different countries, including the host nation Scotland.

== Results ==
Semi-finals
1 August – Glasgow Ibrox Stadium
(Brazil) Internacional | 2
(Netherlands) Ajax | 1
1 August – Glasgow Ibrox Stadium
(Scotland) Rangers | 1
(Spain) Real Sociedad | 0

Final
2 August – Glasgow Ibrox Stadium
(Brazil) Internacional | 1
(Scotland) Rangers | 1
Third place
2 August – Glasgow Ibrox Stadium
(Netherlands) Ajax | 2
(Spain) Real Sociedad | 1

Internacional beat Rangers 5–4 on penalties.
