= Roberto Nunes Morgado =

Brazilian football referee

- Born: 31 May 1946; São Paulo, Brazil
- Died: 26 April 1989 (aged 42); São Paulo, Brazil

Domestic
Years	League	Role
1976–1987	FPF, CBF	Referee

Roberto Nunes Morgado (31 May 1946 – 26 April 1989), was a Brazilian football referee.

== Referee career ==
At just 1.71 m tall and weighing 54 kg, he compensated for his small size with extreme emphasis on his referees, in a style similar to that of Armando Marques. He earned the nickname "Pink Panther" due to the thinness of his legs. One of the main controversies of his career was in the Vasco da Gama vs. Ferroviário in the 1983 Campeonato Brasileiro Série A where he showed the red card to the head of the match's policing, which led the arbitration committee to request a mental health examination of Morgado. His last match was the semi-final of the 1987 Campeonato Paulista between São Paulo vs. Palmeiras.

== Last years and death ==
A year after ending his career, he was diagnosed with AIDS in February 1988. He declared himself bisexual, which at the time made him lose closeness to family and people linked to football, in addition to his wife who ended the marriage. Died on 26 April 1989.
