= Dorinho =

Brazilian footballer (born 1946)

Oldorelino Nunes Leal, best known as Dorinho, (born in Santana do Livramento, Rio Grande do Sul, May 25, 1946) is a Brazilian former football (soccer) player.

Dorinho played for Internacional and Botafogo in the Campeonato Brasileiro.

== Clubs ==
- Fluminense (RS): 1963
- Internacional: 1964 - 1974

== Honours ==
- Campeonato Gaúcho: six times (1969, 1970, 1971, 1972, 1973 and 1974).
