= Armando Marques (referee) =

Brazilian football referee (1930–2014)

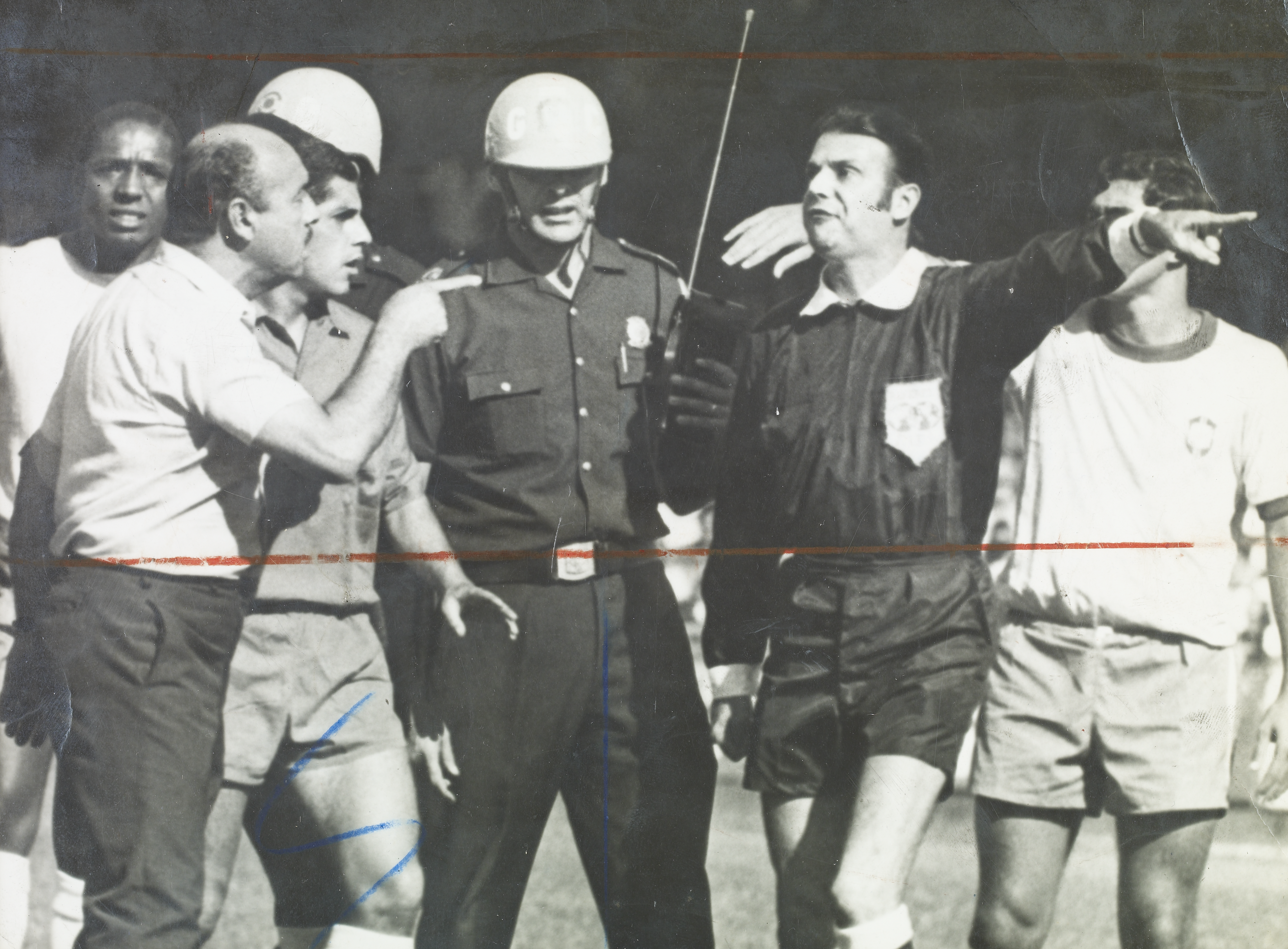
- Full name: Armando Nunes Castanheira da Rosa Marques
- Born: February 6, 1930; Rio de Janeiro, Brazil
- Died: 16 July 2014 (aged 84)

Domestic
Years	League	Role
1961–1977	CBF	Referee

International
Years	League	Role
1966–1974	FIFA	Referee

Armando Nunes Castanheira da Rosa Marques (6 February 1930 – 16 July 2014), was a Brazilian football referee. He was the Brazilian representative referee at the 1966 and 1974 FIFA World Cups.

== Professional ==
Considered by many the best referee in Brazilian football while he was active, whistled professionally from August 13, 1961 to May 8, 1977.

From 1961 to 1963, his career passed in anonymity, nobody knew Armando Marques. Until August 15, 1963, when they faced each other at Estádio do Pacaembu, São Paulo and Santos. São Paulo opened the scoring in the 5th minute through Faustino. Pelé equalized in the 21st minute. But in the final eight minutes of the first half, everything happened. Benê scored São Paulo's second goal in the 37th minute and Sabino increased it to 3-1 in the 40th minute. That's when the confusion started. Santos protested, referee Armando Marques did not tolerate the complaints and expelled Pelé and Coutinho.

End of the first half. Then Santos would have to return for the second half with nine players, but they returned with only eight, claiming that the side Aparecido felt sick in the locker room and was unable to return. The game restarted and at 7 minutes Pagão made it 4 to 1. Then the “cai-cai” started Pepe and Dorval decided to fall and wait for the stretcher so they wouldn't return to the lawn. Armando Marques whistled the end of the match, as Santos did not have a legal number of players to continue the game.

This match entered the history of Brazilian football, as "The Game of Cai-Cai", or else, the game in which Santos ran away from the field. And it was from that day on, with Pelé's expulsion, that referee Armando Marques entered the national scene.

== Controversies ==
Controversies and historical errors marked his career. The first took place in a Fla-Flu, at Estádio do Maracanã in 1968, during the Torneio Roberto Gomes Pedrosa. Fluminense's right winger slapped the ball and scored the only goal of the game. Armando confirmed the goal. Later he saw the bid on television and apologized in front of the red-black crowd.

In 1971, he canceled out a goal by Leivinha (Palmeiras), as he indicated that it was with his hand when the images clearly showed that it was with his head. This mistake helped São Paulo to be the Campeonato Paulista champion that year, as the bid took place in the final between the two clubs.

In 1973, in another final of the Campeonato Paulista, the penalty shootout ended when Santos was winning the penalties shoot-out by 2–0, but still with the possibility of a draw by the Portuguesa de Desportos, as there were two penalties left. His mistake caused the division of the Championship title between the two clubs.

Another historic mistake: final of the 1974 Campeonato Brasileiro, Vasco and Cruzeiro at Maracanã. The Minas Gerais team needed only a draw. Vasco was winning the match by 2–1 when Armando Marques nullified a legitimate goal by player Zé Carlos (Cruzeiro), preventing the Minas Gerais team from becoming Brazilian Champion that year. Another confusion in 1974, Nilton Santos was technical advisor for Botafogo, when Armando went to get the attention of the former star with his finger raised, received a punch from Nilton Santos and fell down the stairs in the Maracanã access tunnel.

== FIFA World Cup ==
Marques also refereed two FIFA World Cup games: one in 1966 (West Germany 2–1 Spain on 20 July) and another in 1974 (Yugoslavia 0–2 West Germany on 26 June 1974).

== Death ==
Marques died on 16 July 2014, in Rio de Janeiro, due to a kidney failure.
