= Escurinho (footballer, born 1950) =

Brazilian footballer

Luís Carlos Machado, best known as Escurinho, (born in Porto Alegre, Rio Grande do Sul, January 18, 1950 – September 27, 2011) was a Brazilian football (soccer) player who played as striker.

Standing out as the head, attended the team's Internacional: of 1970 to 1977, participating in the first two victories achieved by the Brazilian league club Colorado, and seven consecutive state titles. In the Palmeiras, was vice-champion in 1978.

In the mid-1970s, he recorded a self entitled album Escurinho vinyl, as well as composing samba with MPB musicians in Brazil, like Ney Wilson and Bedeu.

In 2009, Escurinho needed to amputate part of one leg due to health problems, such as kidney and diabetes. To assist in the process, Internacional decided to donate proceeds of the box office movie "Nothing will tear us apart," which chronicles the 100 years of living in Colorado, celebrated in 2009.

== Clubs ==
- Internacional: 1970 - 1977
- Palmeiras: 1978
- Coritiba: 1979
- Barcelona Guayaquil: 1980
- Bragantino: 1981
- Caxias: 1982
- Deportes La Serena: 1985

== Honours ==
- Campeonato Gaúcho: Seven times (1970, 1971, 1972, 1973, 1974, 1975 and 1976).
- Campeonato Brasileiro Série A: 1975 and 1976.
- Equatorian Championship: 1980
