= SC Internacional =

Brazilian association football club

Internacional
- Full name: Sport Club Internacional
- Nicknames: Inter; Colorado; Clube do Povo; Celeiro de Ases; Rolo Compressor; Campeão de Tudo; Colossal
- Short name: Inter
- Founded: 4 April 1909; 117 years ago
- Ground: Beira-Rio
- Capacity: 50,128
- President: Alessandro Barcellos
- Head coach: Eduardo Baptista
- League: Campeonato Brasileiro Série A Campeonato Gaúcho
- 2025 2026: Série A, 16th of 20; Gauchão, 2nd of 12
- Website: internacional.com.br
Home colors	Away colors	Third colors

Sport Club Internacional (Brazilian Portuguese pronunciation: [(i)sˈpɔʁtʃ(i) ˈklub(i) ˌĩteɾnasjoˈnaw]), commonly known as Internacional, Inter de Porto Alegre or simply Inter, is a football club in southern Brazil, based in Porto Alegre. They play in the Série A, the first division of the Brazilian league, as well as in Campeonato Gaúcho Série A, the first level of the Rio Grande do Sul state football league. The team's home stadium, known as Estádio Beira-Rio ("Riverside"), was one of the twelve 2014 FIFA World Cup venues and has a capacity of 50,128.

The club was founded in 1909 by the Poppe brothers, with the clear goal of being a democratic institution without prejudice. Its colors are red and white and its fans are known as Colorados. It is one of the most successful clubs in Brazil and the Americas, being the third club with the most international titles in Brazil, with seven trophies. Its historical rival is Grêmio Foot-Ball Porto Alegrense, with whom it contests the Grenal, one of the biggest derbies in world football.

Internacional is part of a large membership-based sports club with more than 140,000 associates. 2006 was the most successful year in Inter's history as they won the Copa Libertadores and the FIFA Club World Cup for the first time, defeating European champions Barcelona in the latter and Club World Cup reigning champions São Paulo in the former. Inter once again won the continental title in 2010.

Other major honours include the 1975, 1976, and 1979 Brazilian league titles, the latter being the only time a club has won the title undefeated, the 2007 and the 2011 Recopa Sudamericana, the 1992 Copa do Brasil, and the 2008 Copa Sudamericana.

== History ==
=== Foundation and early years (1910s) ===
The Club's foundation can be attributed directly to three brothers: Henrique Poppe Leão, José Eduardo Poppe, and Luiz Madeira Poppe. They arrived in Porto Alegre from São Paulo around 1908, a period marked by the rising popularity of football across Brazil. The younger siblings, José and Luiz, had the desire to play football, a sport they learned to practice in São Paulo. Henrique, the older and influential brother, then orchestrated the creation of a new club.

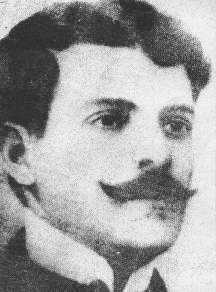
Henrique Poppe, founder of the club.

The genesis of Sport Club Internacional is linked to the combination of diverse nationalities. In contrast to the other teams in Porto Alegre at the time, which primarily catered to descendants of Germans, Inter emerged as inclusive to various ethnic backgrounds. The speeches heard at the meetings always revolved around a very important principle for the Poppe family and those present there. Internacional was being created for Brazilians and foreigners, a clear reference to the discriminatory policies of the other two major existing clubs in Porto Alegre, Grêmio and Fuss-Ball.

The club's colors were inspired by the street carnaval of Porto Alegre. At the time there were two big carnaval organizations in the city, the green Esmeraldinos and the red Venezianos, after a vote the color red was chosen.

The area of Ilhota, once a humble neighborhood rich in cultural influence, served as the team's first ground. The football field on Rua Arlindo, now known as Sport Club Internacional Square, hosted the early training sessions of the team. Subsequently, this location became the venue for the Canela Preta League matches and also saw the emergence of Tesourinha, a prominent Brazilian football talent. Because of frequent flooding in the neighborhood, the Club was compelled to relocate. Thus, in 1910, it moved to Campo da Várzea, now called Parque da Redenção.

The time at Bom Fim neighborhood wouldn't last long, though, and by 1912, Inter had leased Chácara dos Eucaliptos. Situated on an alley with an entrance on Rua da Azenha, this became Inter's inaugural exclusive playing venue. It was here that the club initiated its first series of victories, clinching the City Championship in 1913 and 1917.

=== Consolidation and first stadium (1920s–1930s) ===
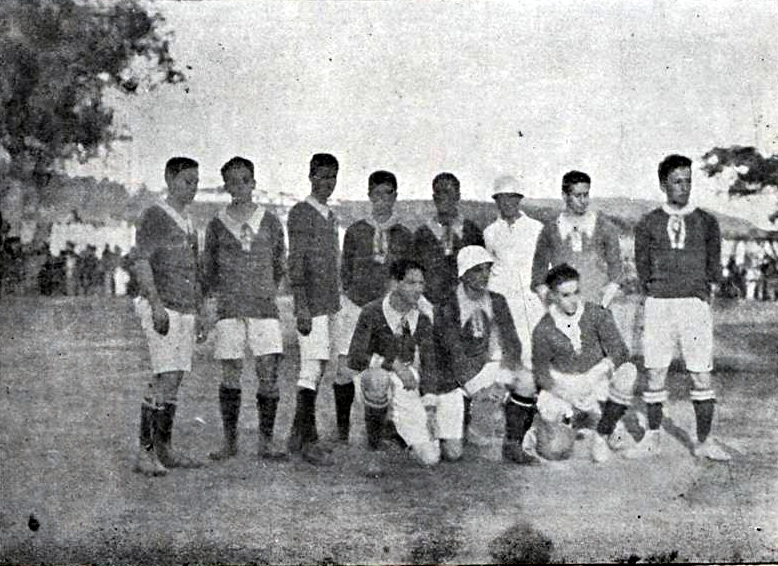
1919 squad

In the 1920s, the second decade of the Colorado's history marked a turning point in the club's history. After the growth of the early years, Inter began to face significant challenges. On the field, few titles were won. Off the field, the situation was not favorable. In addition to financial difficulties, the Colorado almost lost its home, and there was a possibility of the Club closing down. Decisions needed to be made that would alter the course of the club's trajectory.

Inter bounced back and strengthened itself, winning its first state title in 1927, initiating the construction of its first home stadium Estádio dos Eucaliptos and becoming even more popular, fully opening their doors to athletes from other leagues, including black people from Canela Preta league (literally "Black Shins" league).

Inaugurated in 1931, in the Menino Deus neighborhood, the Eucaliptos Stadium would become the stage for many glories and the rise of Inter as the biggest club in southern Brazil. Growing increasingly as the "Clube do Povo" (People's Club), Inter began to identify even more with the humble classes of Gaúcho society, not only in the stands but also on the field. During this era, talented players like Sylvio Pirillo, hailing from Ilhota, and Tupan, who emerged from the Canela Preta league, were prominent. Inter was beginning to assemble the renowned "Rolo Compressor" team and signaled the impending dominance of Gaúcho football.

=== The Rolo Compressor era (1940s) ===
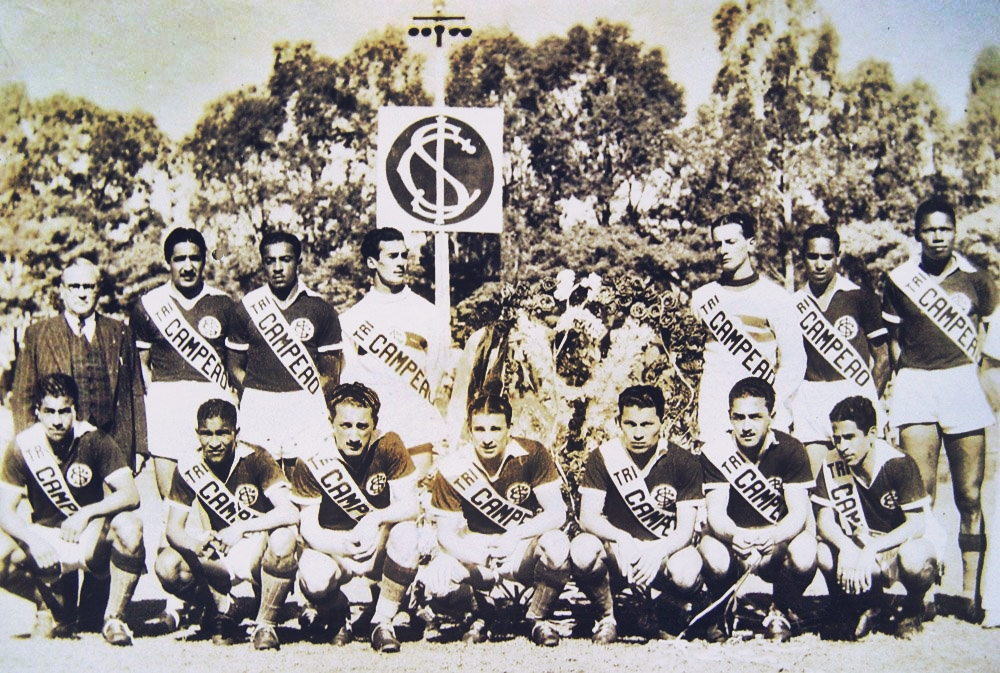
1942 state champions.

The 1940s marked the a golden decade for Internacional. It was characterized by the emergence of enduring idols, along with consistent dominance in the Gre-Nal derby. The Eucaliptos stadium consistently hosted large crowds. In that time, Vicente Rao, who founded the team's first ultra, and Charuto, an often drunk supporter who Luis Fernando Verissimo defined as "a Colorado in pure state", became symbolic fans who are still remembered today. The team of the time is often referred to as the "Rolo Compressor", Portuguese for "Steamroller", an expression coined by Rao for a team that had sustained success in Gaúcho football. The extremely offensive side played from 1939 to 1948 and won eight Rio Grande do Sul championships, and also achieved the first instance of a team winning the state championship six times in a row in Rio Grande do Sul.

The reason for such superiority dated back to 1928, the year Inter started to have black players in their squad – something that was not allowed by rivals Grêmio until 1952. That decision ended up strengthening the team, which placed no restrictions. Before football became professional, however, most black players preferred to play in the Canela Preta league, which provided bonuses for participating athletes. When clubs began to professionalize and pay salaries, albeit low ones, more black athletes start accepting invitations to play for Internacional.

That team included some of the greatest football players in the club's history. Alfeu, Tesourinha, Abigail, Carlitos, Adãozinho, among others. The term "Rolo Compressor" was coined to represent Inter's power of "crushing the opposition" in their quest for victories. It showed the superiority of the team at that time.

=== The Rolinho days (1950s) ===
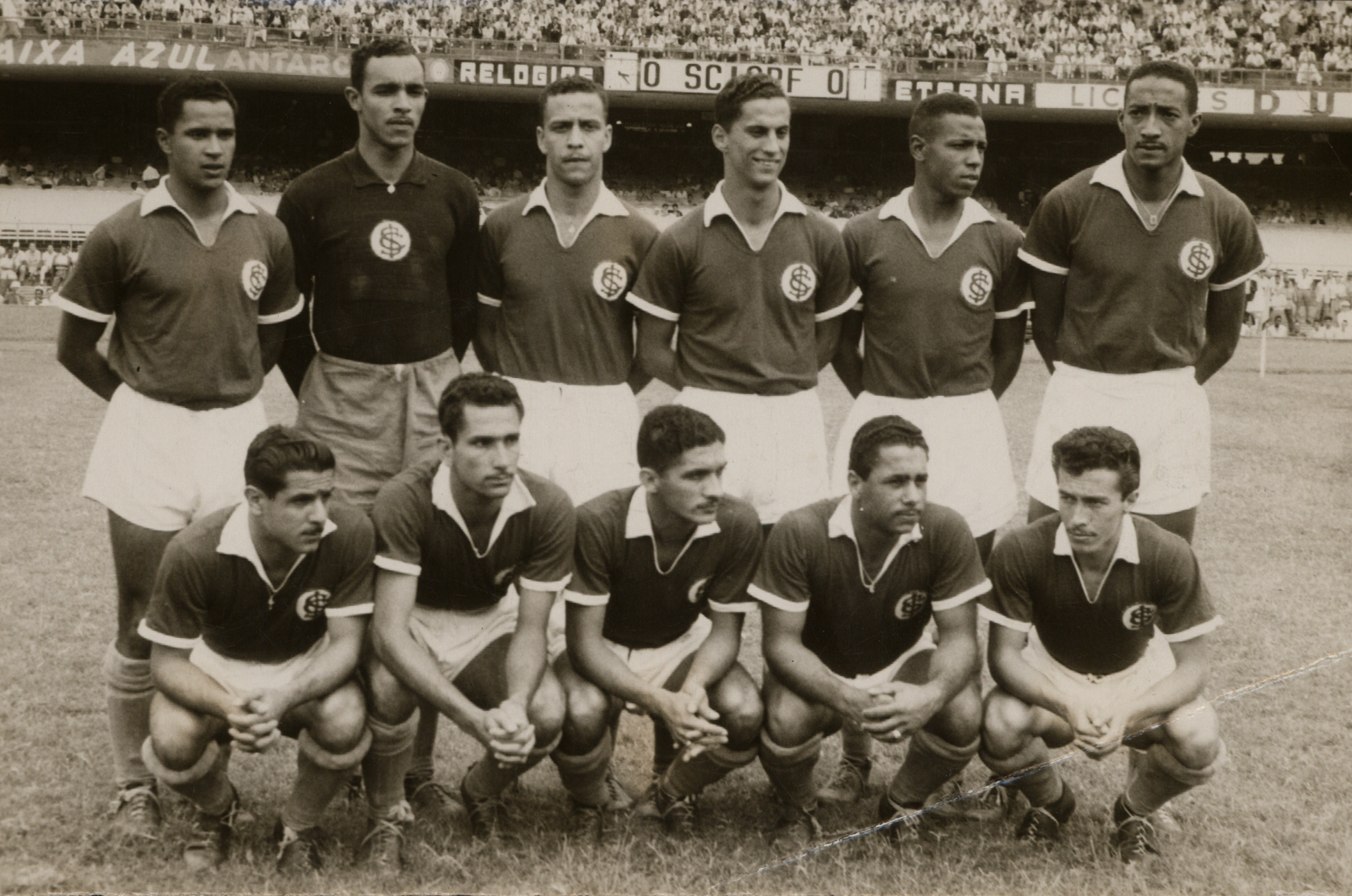
Internacional's team, 1953. National Archives of Brazil.

Supporters rallied behind the construction of the concrete bleachers of Eucaliptos Stadium in 1947, a project that extended until 1950. Similar to the earlier efforts during the construction of the stadium and later during the inauguration of Beira-Rio, it was the fans who mobilized resources and sought materials to enhance the Club's facilities. After that, the stadium hosted two matches of the FIFA World Cup in 1950 – Mexico vs Yugoslavia and Mexico vs Switzerland.

On the pitch, Inter kept having success. The 1950s were marked by a squad of great players like Paulinho, Florindo, Oréco, Chinesinho, Odorico, Salvador, Jerônimo, Luizinho and Canhotinho, all led by the manager Teté in a team that would be called the "Rolinho" (little steamroller) in allusion to the great team of the 1940s. The great stars of this period, however, were certainly the strikers Bodinho and Larry. Among the achievements of this decade are five state titles and a 6–2 victory against Grêmio in the inauguration of the Estádio Olímpico, the new home of the rival team. The quality of the team is also proven by the fact that Inter provided most of the squad for the Brazilian national team that won the 1956 Pan-American Games in Mexico.

=== Building the Beira-Rio (1960s) ===
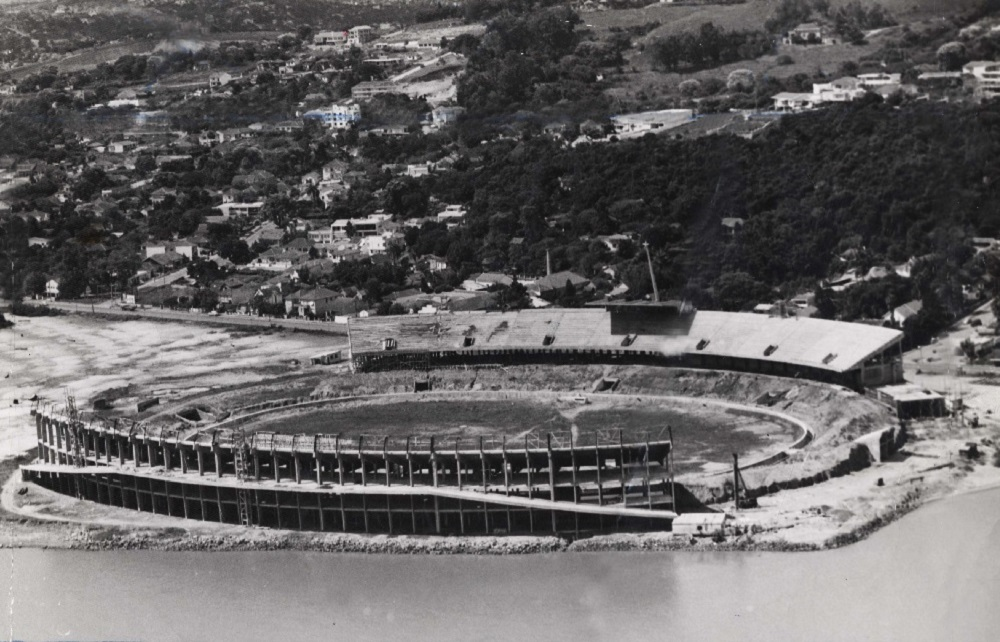
Construction of Beira-Rio in the Guaíba Lake in the 1960s

The club spent three decades at the Eucaliptos Stadium, yet it eventually became inadequate for the club's growing needs. In the Sixties, the Eucaliptos was becoming small for the large fan base.

Exactly in the year when the long-standing dominance of Inter in the Gaúcho football was coming to an end, 1956, the story of the construction of the Beira-Rio, began. On 12 September 1956, Councilman Ephraim Pinheiro Cabral, a man involved in football who had presided over Inter on several occasions, presented a project in the Porto Alegre City Council for the donation of an area that would be filled in the Guaíba River. In fact, Inter was gaining a piece of land within the water.

The Beira-Rio was largely built with the contribution of the fans, who brought bricks, cement, and iron for the construction, including from the countryside. In this regard, there were special radio programs to mobilize Internacional supporters throughout Rio Grande do Sul, but the 1960s were a challenging period for Inter in football, the Beira-Rio seemed like it would never be completed. Tired of the team's defeats at the nearby Eucaliptos Stadium, fans would go out to see the construction of the new stadium and to cheer for the construction workers.

Despite the scarce financial resources, primarily directed towards the construction of the Beira-Rio, Inter assembled good teams, relying on the talent of youngsters like Bráulio, Dorinho, and Pontes. In their first participation in a national competition, the Torneio Roberto Gomes Pedrosa of 1967, Inter had a strong campaign, reaching the final phase and ultimately securing the runner-up position against Ademir da Guia's Palmeiras. The following year, the Colorado repeated their performance, narrowly missing out on the title, finishing just behind Pelé's Santos. Inter was beginning to establish itself among the top clubs in Brazil.

Finally, the Beira-Rio was inaugurated on Sunday, 6 April 1969, two days and 60 years after the foundation of Inter. The inaugural match was a 2–1 victory against Benfica from Portugal, which had Eusébio as its main star, Claudiomiro scored the first goal at the new stadium

=== Kings of Brazil (1970s) ===
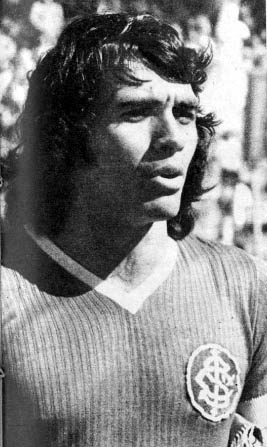
Elias Figueroa a prominent defender and key player for Internacional.

In 1970s Internacional achieved eight Campeonato Gaúcho titles in a row, the longest consecutive title streak in the state, winning all regional championships from 1969 to 1976. It was a remarkable accomplishment for Internacional, surpassing their rival Grêmio's seven titles streak in 1960s. The 1970s, however, would bring even more achievements.

Inter achieved great results in the first national championships it competed in at Beira-Rio, finishing in fifth place in the 1969, 1970 and 1971 tournaments, which were decided in quadrangular rounds. Gradually, names like Valdomiro, Claudiomiro, Carpegiani, Hermínio, Pontes, Cláudio Duarte, Tovar, and Carbone were taking on the leading roles of the red team. Leading the red dugout at the turn of the decade was the manager Daltro Menezes.

Changes and progress started in 1972. Now under the command of a new coach, Dino Sani, Inter received the reinforcement of Chilean center-back Figueroa, who would soon become an idol of the colorados. The year also brought a third place at the Brasileirão, achieved in a historic campaign that took the club to the semifinals against Palmeiras. A draw in 1-1, however, took the team from São Paulo to the finals.

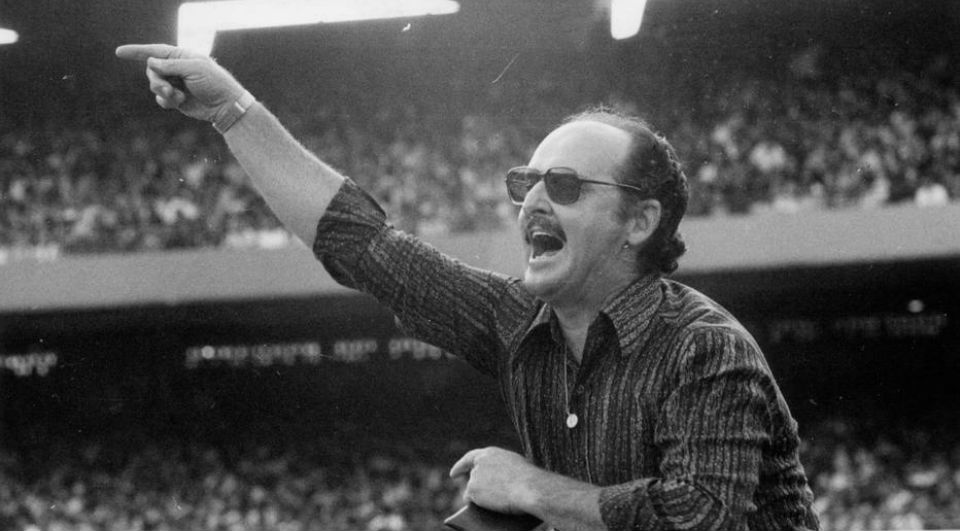
Rubens Minelli took over Internacional in 1974 and was the team's coach until 1976.

Consolidated in the country's national championship, the club reached the mid-1970s determined not only to occupy a prominent role in the tournament but also to lift the long-awaited trophy. To achieve this, the club went after a coach with experience in national cups. At the opening of 1974, Inter had a new commander: Rubens Minelli. The coach was revolutionary for his time, known for deploying teams that controlled space and performed rehearsed plays, also introducing in Brazil the famous offside trap. That year, the club also signed goalkeeper Manga from Nacional, and left winger Lula from Fluminense. With the signing of Lula for the left wing, which happened almost simultaneously with Minelli's arrival, Inter began to show greater balance on the sides of the field. Already beloved by the red crowd, Valdomiro, who participated in 1974 FIFA World Cup, ruled the right flank, but lacked a companion with football skills matching his own on the other side. In midfield, Paulo Roberto Falcão was already established as a starter. The main highlight in the central region, however, was Paulo César Carpegiani. One of Brazil's key players on the World Cup that year, the number 10 was idolized by the fans. To the duo of Paulos, Escurinho was added, thus completing Minelli's trio of midfielders. From the youth categories, the champions of the Copa São Paulo at the beginning of the season, Jair, Caçapava, Chico Fraga and Batista were also integrated into the main squad, adding even more strength to the red team. In the Brasileirão, two draws and one defeat in the final quadrangular resulted in another fourth place. However, this time, the team ended the season with greater authority than seen in the past. United, the group was ready to conquer Brazil.

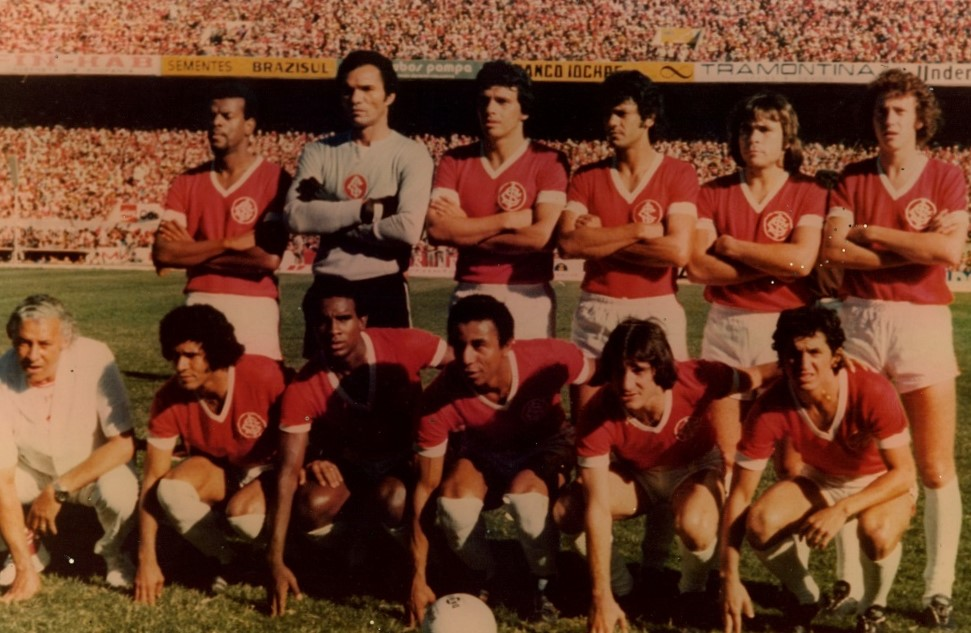
Internacional's Brazilian champion squad of 1975.

The opening of the 1975 season was different for Inter. Given its growing fame, the club was invited to undertake a tour of Europe. Rubens Minelli spent five consecutive weeks with his players, a crucial time to earn even greater admiration from the athletes and consequently, to fully implement his football concepts within the group. The results obtained endorsed the innovations promoted in Inter's team. In 14 matches, Inter won 13 games and drew one, scoring 50 goals and conceding only one. Excellent, these numbers justly represented the high performance of the team, prompting comparisons, from The Sunday Times, between Inter and AFC Ajax who had recently won three consecutive Champions League titles.

After winning a seventh state title in a row, Inter debuted the 1975 Brazilian Championship on Wednesday, 20 August. At Beira-Rio, tens of thousands of Inter fans filled the stands to cheer for the People's Club in the opening round of the Brasileirão. Riding high on its state championship victory, Inter continued their good form and the team went on to end the initial phase of the Brasileirão at the top of their group, adding eight victories, two draws, and only one defeat. The second phase saw Inter oscillating, but ultimately qualifying in second place. In the semifinal, the opponent would be Fluminense's Tricolor Machine. Fluminense wasn't dubbed the Machine by chance. A historic generation at the Rio de Janeiro-based Tricolor, featuring names like Félix, Carlos Alberto Torres, Marco Antônio, and Paulo Cezar Caju, who were World Cup champions with Brazil in 1970, reached its peak in 1975 with the signing of Rivellino, another star from the Brazil squad that won the World Cup in Mexico. The gaúchos came out on top by winning 2-0, with goals from Lula, after a beautiful pass from Falcão, and a stunning goal from Paulo César Carpegiani. The result took the Inter to face Cruzeiro in the grand final.

The mobilization for the final was impressive. Even though the match was scheduled for Sunday, 14 December, hotel rooms in Porto Alegre had been fully booked since Friday. Even earlier, on Thursday, tickets for the Inter fans had been sold out. The Beira-Rio, massive as it was, seemed small compared to the passion of the fans, who came from all corners to the Rio Grande do Sul capital. Everyone wanted to be part of the decision - the people from the stands and the athletes field. Inter was aware of the quality of Cruzeiro, a traditional team already crowned as Brazilian champions in 1966, and boasting an abundance of star players in its lineup. Piazza led other stars such as Raul, Nelinho, Zé Carlos, Joãozinho, and Palhinha, all of whom were national team players. For this reason as well, that made the match be played at a reduced pace, characterized by constant analysis from both sides on the first half. The title-winning goal, was scored by Elias Figueroa. Known as the "illuminated goal," as the Chilean defender headed the ball within a beam of sunlight from the sunset over the Guaíba, at the 11th minute of the second half. That ball finding the back of the net marked the beginning of the club's sequence of victories in the 1970s. Inter was the first club from Rio Grande do Sul to win the Brazilian Championship, which was largely dominated by teams from São Paulo, winners of 12 of the 18 national titles contested until then, whether in the current format or the previous Taça Brasil and Torneio Roberto Gomes Pedrosa. In total, there were 29 games, 58 points earned, 18 victories, eight draws, and only three defeats, Inter also scored more goals than any other team and conceded the fewest goals, Flavio was also the top scorer of the competition.

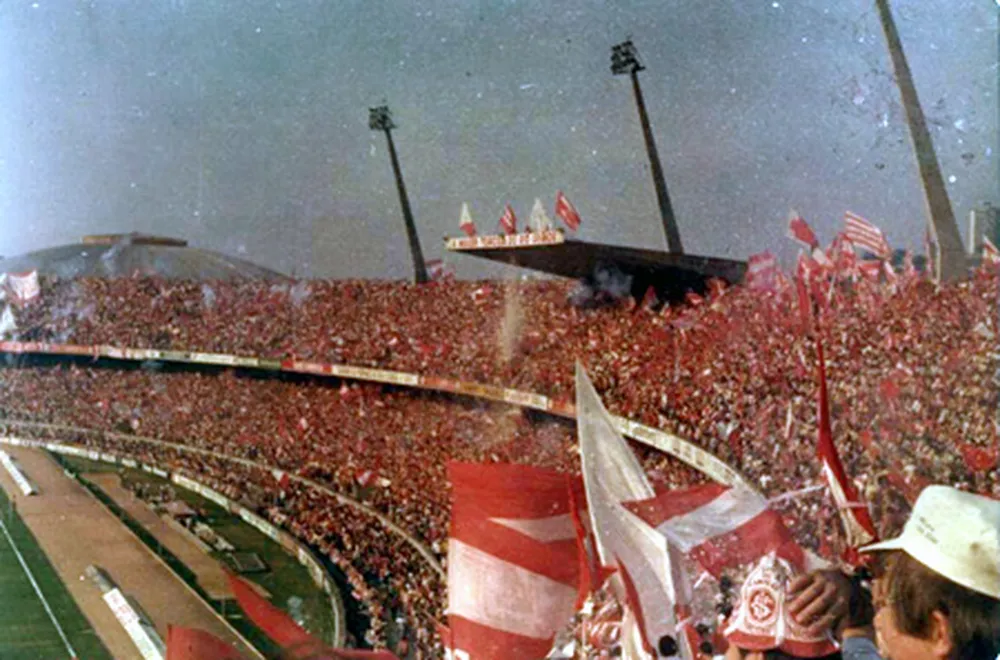
Internacional fans at Beira-Rio during 1979 Brazilian Championship

For the 1976 championship, Hermínio, Carpegiani, and Flávio were replaced in the starting lineup by Marinho Peres, Batista, and Dario. These were the main differences between Inter's teams in 1975 and 1976. With an even better team than the previous year, Internacional was once again sovereign in the first phase of the 1976 Brazilian Championship, with 7 wins and 1 loss in 8 games, scoring impressive 25 goals and securing the top position. In the second phase, the team didn't lose, winning 4 games and drawing 1. In the third phase, six wins and two losses in eight games led the team, in first place, to the competition's semifinals. The semifinal was played at Beira Rio. And Atlético Mineiro fought hard in a match that felt like an early final. Vantuir opened the scoring for the Minas Gerais team, which showcased the youthfulness of Toninho Cerezo, Paulo Isidoro, and Reinaldo. The lead was maintained until the 73rd minute. Batista rescued Inter, scoring the 1-1 equalizer. And it was him, Falcão, who sealed Inter's advancement with a legendary goal, the result of a header exchange with Escurinho, in the dying moments of what is remembered as one of the greatest matches in the history of the Brazilian Championship.

With the right to play the final again at home, Internacional had no trouble securing their second Brazilian title against Corinthians. The São Paulo team relied more on grit and emotion than on technique and were beaten by a score of 2-0, with goals from Dario and Valdomiro. Internacional became Brazilian champions for the second time, crowning their efficient, brilliant, and technical football, as well as elevating Falcão, Figueroa, Manga, and Carpegiani to the highest level among the greats of Brazilian football. The campaign in 1976 was remarkable: in 23 matches for the Brazilian Championship, the team won 19, drew one and lost just three. At the end of the 1976 season, however, coach Rubens Minelli left Inter, concluding a journey of 153 victories, 44 draws and only 20 defeats across 217 matches and three seasons. The coach would go on to win a third national title in a row in 1977, this time with São Paulo.

The 1975 and 1976 titles gave Inter the chance to participate on the Copa Libertadores for the first couple of times. The national success wasn't repeated on the continental level, however. In 1976, the defending national champion and its runner-up represented Brazil in the Copa Libertadores de América. At that time, Inter and Cruzeiro were placed in a group with Paraguay's Olimpia and Sportivo Luqueño. They led the competition with some ease. However, in a contest where only one team could advance, the stars of Minas Gerais shone brightly. And one game, in particular, became immortalized. Cruzeiro 5, Internacional 4. Arguably the two best teams in Brazil, the teams from Rio Grande do Sul and Minas Gerais engaged in a decisive and spectacular clash. The following year, in 1977, Inter managed to advance past the group stage, defeating Corinthians and the Ecuadorian teams El Nacional and Deportivo Cuenca. However, once again, they succumbed to Cruzeiro in the next phase, losing at home in another closely contested match, 1-0.

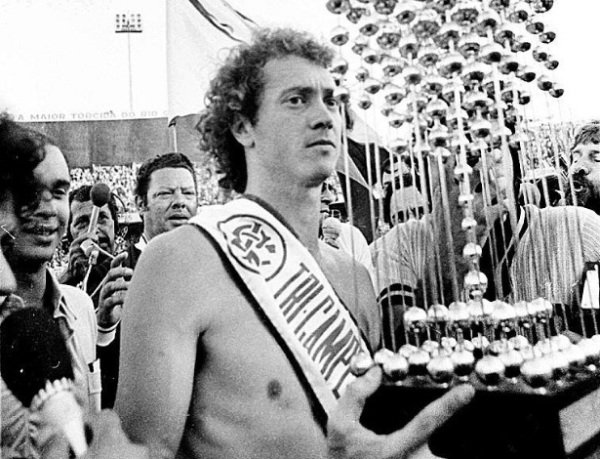
Paulo Roberto Falcão holding the trophy of the 1979 Brazilian Championship

The end of the decade, however, was crowned with yet another title, now under new coach Ênio Andrade. With a record number of participants, the 1979 Brazilian Championship was contested by 94 teams. The 1979 Inter team helped revolutionize Brazilian football. While the two-time champion generation played in a clear 4-3-3 formation, designed to maximize the actions of Valdomiro and Lula, respective wingers on the right and left, the 1979 team easily varied between the two lines of three and a midfield composed of four players and two forwards. The team's great wildcard was Mário Sérgio, successor to Lula in the position but responsible for performing a completely different role. After three group stages, the semifinals were reached, in which Internacional eliminated Palmeiras, while Vasco da Gama left Coritiba behind. In the finalw, Internacional won 2-0 the first leg against Vasco in Rio de Janeiro. Excited by the advantage obtained in the first match and euphoric due to the great campaign, Inter fans filled the Beira-Rio for the second leg. Up to that point, in the 22 matches played in the championship, Inter had amassed 15 victories and seven draws, scoring 38 goals and conceding only 12. Therefore, more than just the title, the supporters in red and white desired the laurels of an undefeated conquest. With all players available, Ênio chose his ideal starting eleven. In goal was Benítez. João Carlos, Mauro Galvão, Mauro Pastor, and Cláudio Mineiro formed the defense, while Falcão, Batista, and Jair were the chosen midfielders. Finally, the attack consisted of Valdomiro, Bira, and Mário Sérgio. The team was superior and won 2-1, Bira scored the first and Falcão scored the final goal of the victorious campaign, sealing Internacional's third Brazilian championship on 23 December 1979. Internacional was a champion undefeated, a deed yet unmatched by any other club in Brazil.

=== Falling short (1980s) ===
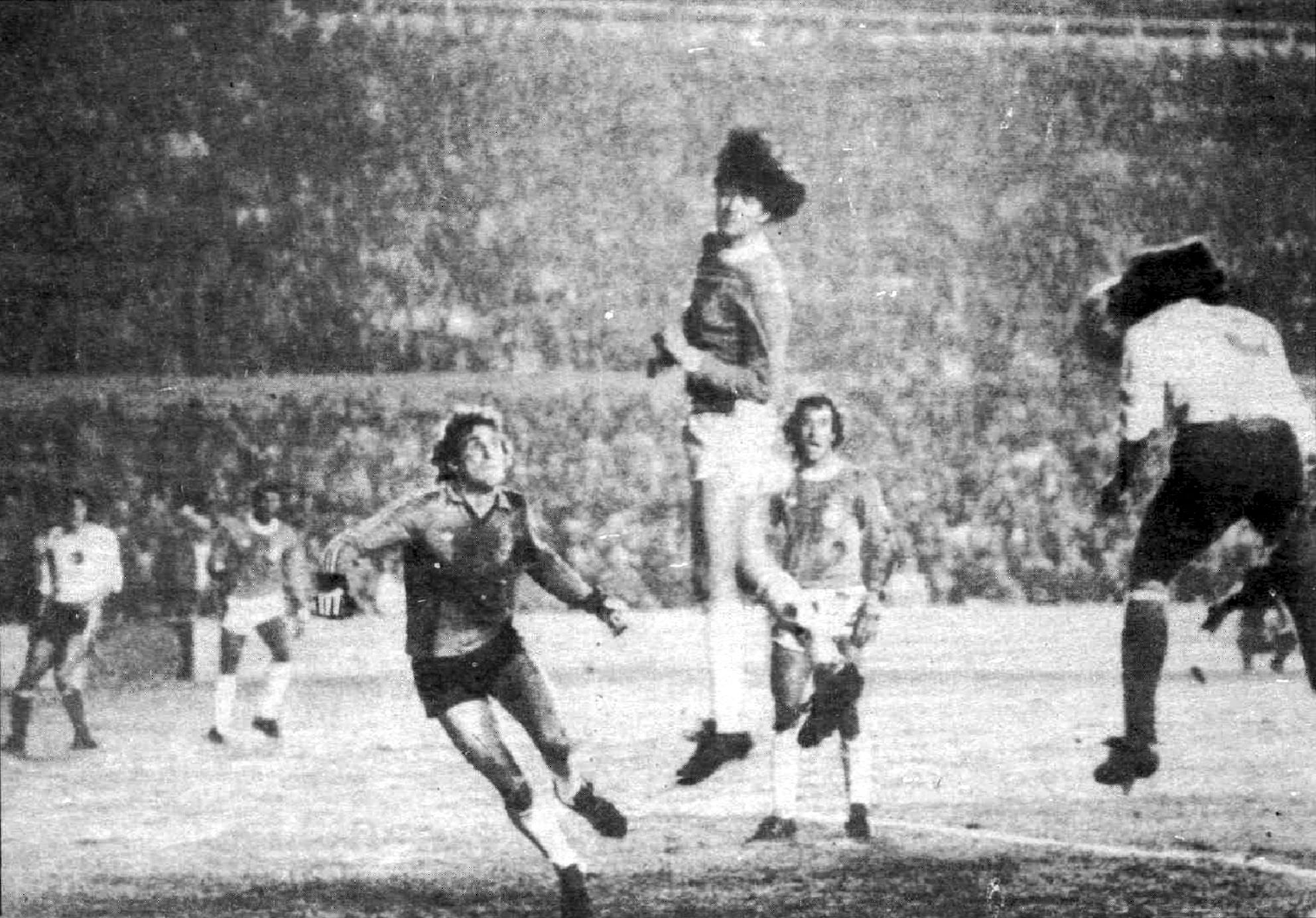
Waldemar Victorino scores the winning goal for Nacional against Internacional in 1980 Libertadores Final at Centenario.

The 1980s started off well, with Internacional enhancing its international stature. The Brazilian champions of 1979 led by manager Ênio Andrade and legends such as Falcão, Valdomiro and Batista, reached the final of the Copa Libertadores for the first time in 1980 where the team were grouped in Group 3 alongside compatriots Vasco da Gama and Venezuelan sides Deportivo Galicia and Deportivo Táchira. Internacional finished first in their group with four wins, one tie and one loss (although the defeat surprisingly came from Deportivo Galicia). In the semi-finals stage, the Colorados were grouped with Argentine side Vélez Sarsfield and Colombian powerhouse América de Cali; once again, Inter managed to top the group with two victories over Velez and two draws against America (which was enough to see them reach the final). In the finals, Internacional faced off against Nacional, who had already won the Copa Libertadores once in 1971. The Colorado couldn't break the Uruguayan backline and the first leg, played at the Beira-Rio, finished 0–0. At the Estadio Centenario in Montevideo, Inter were defeated 1–0.

Despite losing what was, at that point, Internacional's most important match ever, the team went on to win the Campeonato Gaúcho four years in a row starting in 1981. The success of rivals Grêmio, however, winning the Brazilian Championship of 1981 and the 1983 Libertadores and Intercontinental Cup, alongside Inter's defeats at important finals made this decade a bittersweet one for the Colorado team. While the previous decade was full of laurels and glories, the 1980s didn't taste quite the same. Despite assembling talented teams and achieving good performances, Inter fell short in the most important competitions. The club, however, participated on many international friendly tournaments, winning the 1982 Joan Gamper against Barcelona and Manchester City, the only non-European team to do so. Inter also won the 1984 Trofeo Costa del Sol, the 1983 Europac Cup, the 1984 Kirin Cup the 1987 Glasgow International Tournament, the 1987 Trofeo Cidade de Vigo and the 1989 Trofeo Ciudad de Ceuta

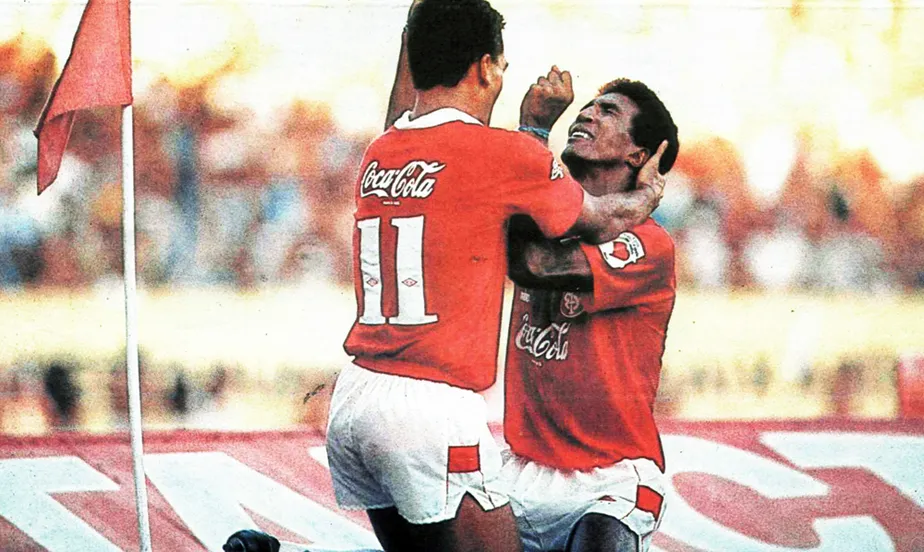
Nílson scored for Internacional in the Grenal of the Century

In the late 1980s Inter got close to winning the Brazilian Championship once more, reaching two consecutive finals. In 1987, Inter started off well after finishing the first phase in first place of their group with four wins, two ties, and two defeats. In the semi-finals, the squad overcame Cruzeiro after a 0–1 victory at the Mineirão. However, in the finals Inter lost the chance at a fourth title after being defeated by Flamengo, containing famous players as Zico, Bebeto, Jorginho, Leandro, Edinho, Leonardo, Andrade, Zinho and Renato Gaúcho.

In 1988, Inter once again reached a final, after finishing second in their group in the first phase. On the semi-finals, however, the Colorado faced a battle against arch-rivals Grêmio in what was called "The Grenal of the Century", so named because for the first time it pitted the bitter rivals against each other in a national competition knockout stage. The 1988 semifinal, decided only in February 1989, determined the finalist for the championship and also granted a spot in the Copa Libertadores. The exaggerated nickname was more than justified at the end of the match: the duel transcended the competition itself and became one of the most emblematic events in Inter's history. The red side ended the first half down 1–0 and with just ten players on the pitch after Grêmio dominated the first 45 minutes. In the second half, pushed by a large crowd at Beira-Rio, the Colorados came from behind to defeat Grêmio 2–1 with two goals scored by striker Nílson.

A few days later, Inter would lose the title to the surprising team of Bahia, showing that in the 1980s, even in the most successful moments, it was impossible to be completely happy. The Grenal of the Century was more than a game, it was a catharsis that transcended causes and consequences. Even though Internacional was considered the favourite to win, the team fell to Bahia after losing 2–1 away on the first leg and failing to capitalize at home with a 0–0 tie.

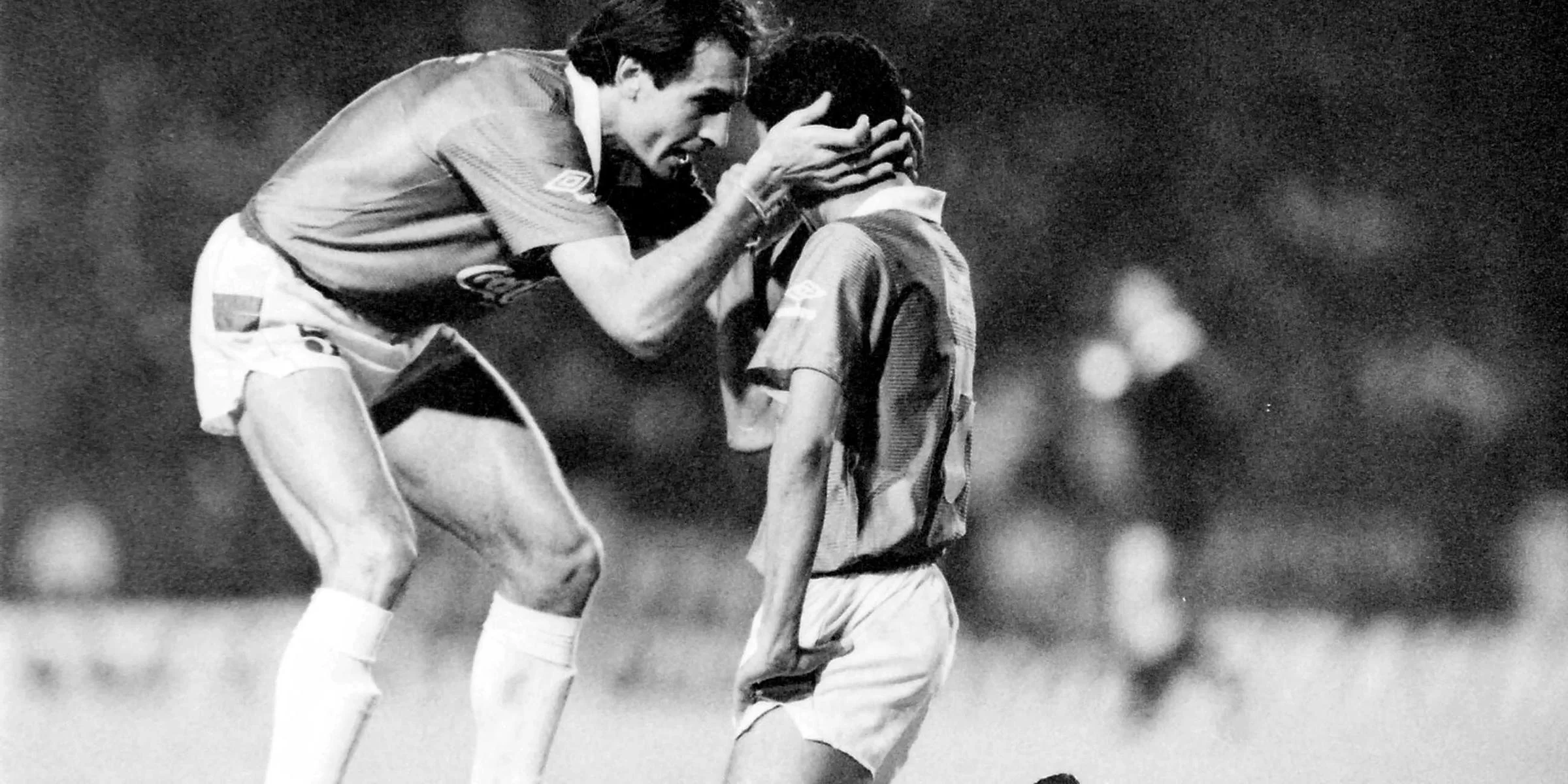
Internacional lost the semi-finals to Olimpia in the 1989 Libertadores.

In the 1989 Copa Libertadores, nine years after the 1980 final, Internacional got close to the Libertadores title once more. After a poor star on the competition; the team managed to progress to the Round of 16 but only after finishing third in their group, winning only two matches, drawing once and losing three. However, that would change in the knockout stages as Inter defeated five-times winners Peñarol 1–2 in Montevideo and 6–2 in Porto Alegre. The quarter-finals saw the team face off against Brazilian champions Bahia in a rematch of the Brasileirão finals of a few months earlier; this time, Internacional beat Bahia 1–0 at home and ground out a 0–0 draw to progress. The semifinals had Internacional face off against a tough opponent: Olimpia, who were the reigning champions of Paraguay. Olimpia, were blossoming in their second golden era with players such as Ever Almeida, Gabriel González, Adriano Samaniego, and star Raúl Vicente Amarilla, all coached by Luis Cubilla. After winning the first semifinal match at Defensores del Chaco 1-0, the team led by Abel Braga played for a draw at home to secure a spot in the final. Excited, 69,928 Inter fans packed the Beira-Rio, some of them already waving banners saying 'Inter, champions of America.' Little did they know that the dream would turn into a nightmare. Olimpia managed a spirited comeback and won the return leg 2–3 silencing the Beira-Rio. Inter even had a penalty kick in their favor, which was failed to convert into goal. Since the aggregate was tied at 3–3, a penalty shootout ensued to decide the finalist, and Olimpia won 3–5, eliminating the Colorados. This elimination has been dubbed as the worst trauma lived by the supporters at the Beira-Rio stadium.

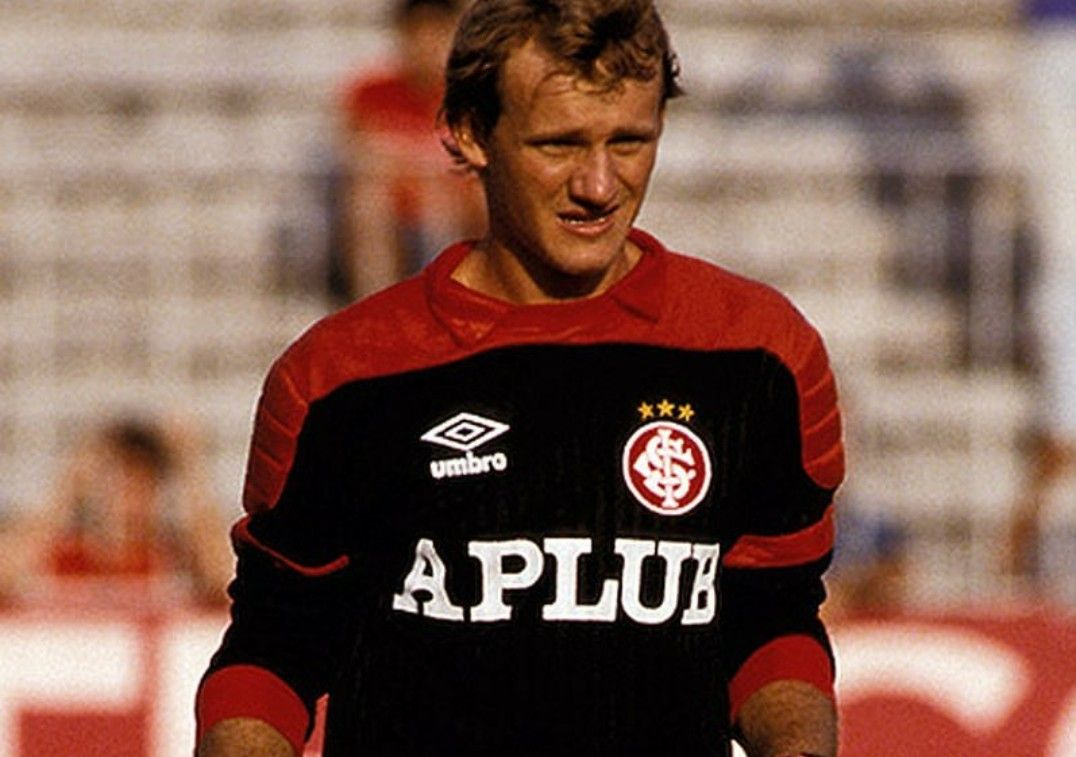
Taffarel playing for Internacional in the 1980s

Even though the 1980s were not successful for the club, the decade marked the emergence of some players who became major stars in Brazilian football, such as midfielder Dunga and goalkeeper Taffarel, world champions in 1994 with the Brazilian national team, as well as talents like Luís Carlos Winck, Aloísio and Pinga. Because of that, Internacional found itself as the base for the national team again, in 1984. The last time this has happened was in 1956, when eight footballers out of the 22-player squad called up for the national team for the Pan-American Games played for Internacional. At the 1984 Summer Olympics, Internacional had their whole squad called up, creating a Brazilian side known as "Sele/Inter". Brazil lost to France in the final and won the silver medal. That same group would help Internacional become Brazilian runners-up in 1987 and 1988.

=== Years of resistance (1990s) ===
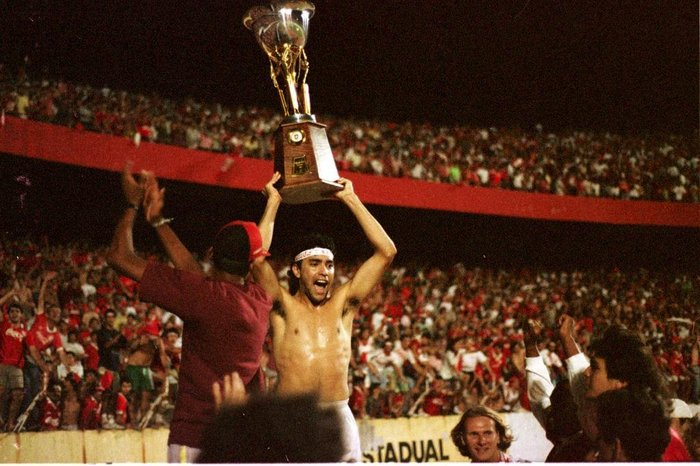
Internacional won the 1992 Copa do Brasil title

After a decade of misses, the 1990s started promising. In 1992, Internacional finally won its fourth national-level title, the championship-winning campaign in the Copa do Brasil, was thrilling. After thrashing Corinthians at the Pacaembu Stadium with a 4–0 victory in the round of 16, Inter faced Grêmio in the quarter-finals. The duel was balanced, and after two draws, Inter secured the spot over the rival in a penalty shootout. In the semi-final, another overwhelming victory over the teams from São Paulo. The Internacional showed no mercy to Palmeiras and won both legs of the tie - 2–0 at Parque Antártica and 2–1 at the Beira-Rio. The final was thrilling from start to finish. Inter took the lead against Fluminense with a goal by Caíco at the Laranjeiras, but then suffered a turnaround. In Porto Alegre, the team had to overturn the 2–1 scoreline. The title-winning goal came in a dramatic fashion: a penalty kick by Célio Silva in the 88th minute. The club secured the title due to the away goals rule.

In the 1990s, Internacional faced increased competition from rivals Grêmio. Inter secured four state championships (1991, 1992, 1994, and 1997), and defeated Grêmio 5–2 at the Olímpico stadium, with Fabiano scoring multiple goals.

This would culminate in a dramatic season in 1999, in which Inter almost faced relegation. The season started promising, with the signing of midfielder Dunga, former captain of the world champion Brazilian national team and who had started his career at Inter. At the end of that year, however, the midfielder didn't have good performances, and the team was still fighting against relegation to Serie B. On 10 November, in a packed Beira-Rio and with a header by Dunga, at 36 minutes into the second half, Internacional defeated Palmeiras 1-0 and avoided relegation to the second division of the Brazilian Championship for the first time. The stadium lights were turned off at 46 minutes into the second half, moments after Inter's coach, Leão, was sent off. After a few minutes of interruption, the light returned, and the game could be concluded and Inter remained in the first division.

=== Renaissance and international success (2000–2015) ===
After the long and disappointing 1990s, Inter would still have to face some challenges in the early 2000s decade before the tide started to change. After escaping relegation in 1999, in 2002 Internacional almost faced relegation once again. In the last match of the season, to avoid dropping to the second national division, Internacional didn't rely solely on themselves. The team needed Palmeiras to lose to Vitória in Salvador, and for Portuguesa not to win against Bahia in Canindé. Indeed, the parallel results unfolded. The biggest challenge would be defeating Paysandu in Belém, which in that same year had won the Copa dos Campeões against Cruzeiro. Therefore, it wasn't impossible to envision a loss at the Mangueirão. The intense heat in Belém prevented a faster pace in the first half, but Internacional returned for the second part and secured a 2–0 victory, with goals from Mahicon Librelato and Fernando Baiano. That year would also mark a tragedy for Librelato, who scored on that match. Just eleven days after helping saving Inter from relegation, in the early hours of 28 November, a car accident on Beira-Mar Avenue in Florianópolis resulted in the death of the 21-year-old promising young forward. The car he was driving lost control on a curve near the Hercílio Luz Bridge and plunged into the sea. For years the player was remembered on a banner with the words "Librelato lives 7" at Beira-Rio.

It seemed liked another decade of difficult times was coming, but under the leadership of a new president, Inter was finding its way back to the top. Fernando Carvalho has a lot to do with the successful comeback of the club. Recognized even by political adversaries as an executive who understands football, the sports official first ran for the presidency of Internacional in 1999 but was defeated. He won in 2001, faced a difficult year in 2002, but started a transformation process in 2003 that led the club to the top of the world. Carvalho and his team took various measures to reform the club. These included implementing long-term contracts, particularly extending up to five years for young players, as well as adopting performance-based contracts. Additionally, they implemented a strategic plan aimed at boosting the number of club members and made substantial investments in the youth academy. Upon assuming the role, the club had a mere 7,000 associates. However, by the time they left the presidency, membership had soared to 45,000.

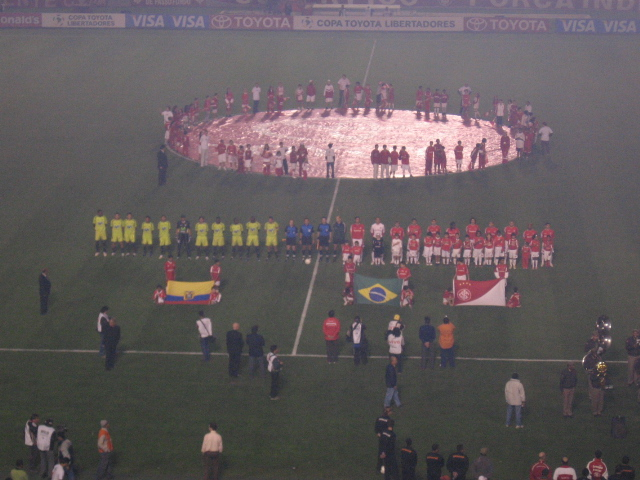
Internacional and LDU Quito in the 2006 Copa Libertadores quarter-final at Beira-Rio.

Under the leadership of the chairman, Inter entered the new millennium seeking renewal from their youth teams. The club won four state titles in a row, from 2002 to 2005. The club modernized all its departments and prepared for a new football era. The South American Cup meant a return to the world stage and prepared the team for contesting the Copa Libertadores title. The campaign included eight wins, six draws, and just one defeat, to Ecuador's LDU Quito in the quarter-finals. To win the title, Internacional had to move past two clubs that had won the tournament three times – Uruguay's Nacional and São Paulo, who were the defending champions.

Against São Paulo, Internacional arguably won the title away in the first leg. In front of 80,000 são-paulinos attending the match at the Morumbi stadium, Rafael Sóbis scored twice in the second half before defender Edcarlos scored for São Paulo. Internacional needed just a draw in the second leg at home, and they left the pitch as South American champions for the first time. Striker Fernandão, who, along with Tinga, scored in the final match at the Beira-Rio stadium, was one of the 14 players finishing as top scorer of the Libertadores, with five goals. He was voted Man of the Match against São Paulo and won a Toyota Corolla as the prize. Fernandão put the car up for auction and gave the money to charity organizations.

Internacional competed in the 2006 FIFA Club World Cup and shocked the heavily favored European champions Barcelona with such stars as Ronaldinho and Deco 0–1000 in the final for their first ever World Championship. They would also win the 2007 Recopa Sudamericana. Amidst all the defeated in 2006, International had a bad start to the 2007 season. But to close this winning cycle with a triumph, Inter won the Recopa Sudamericana as they defeated Mexican club Pachuca with a final score of 5–2. In the first game in Mexico, the team had a good performance but was defeated 2–1. Alexandre Pato opened the scoring. In the second match, supported by over 51,000 fans crammed into Beira-Rio, Inter beat the opponent by a score of 4–0 – the biggest win of the competition's history.

After the Recopa triumph, Internacional struggled to refill the ranks left after the triumphant generation of 2006; the club finished in 11th place in the Série A, which was barely enough to allow Internacional to participate in the 2008 Copa Sudamericana. In 2008, Internacional won their state championship and participated in a friendly tournament called Dubai Cup 2008. In the same year, Internacional won the Copa Sudamericana, beating Argentine side Estudiantes de La Plata, becoming the first Brazilian winners of the trophy. Internacional repeated the Copa Sudamericana title; finished in a much-improved 6th place in the national league; retained their state title; reached the finals of the Copa do Brasil (the best finish the club has had since 1999); and won the Suruga Bank tournament. On 2 April 2009, Inter launched its third uniform celebrating its centenary, with a golden shirt, red shorts and red socks. The golden shirt represented the glories won in their history. In August 2009, English club Tottenham Hotspur announced that a partnership was completed between the two clubs. The team performed extremely well on the 2009 Brazilian Championship, finishing as runners-up to Flamengo by 2 points. With this 2nd place, Internacional qualified to participate, once again, in the 2010 Copa Libertadores.

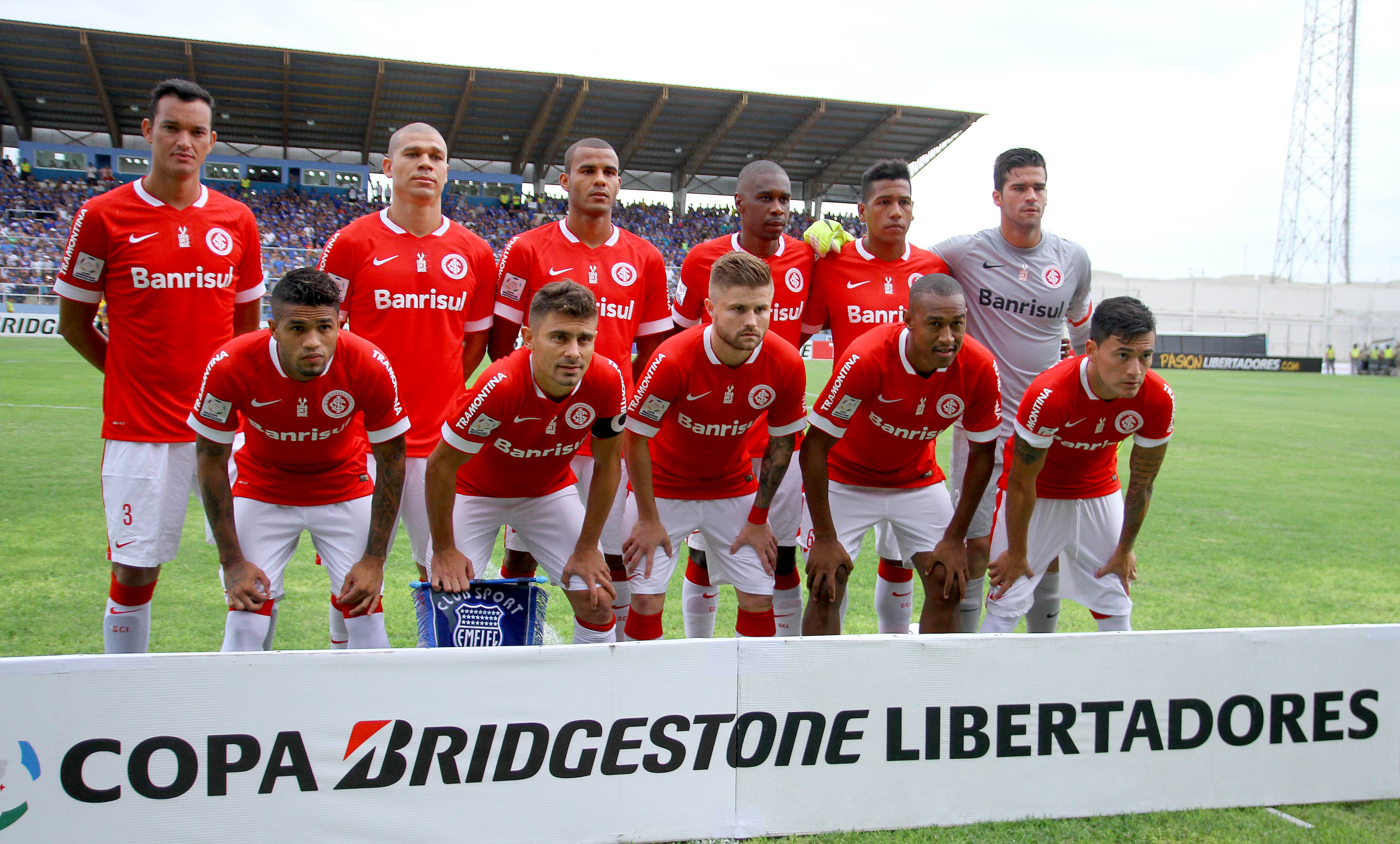
Internacional line-up for Copa Libertadores game against Emelec on 18 March 2015.

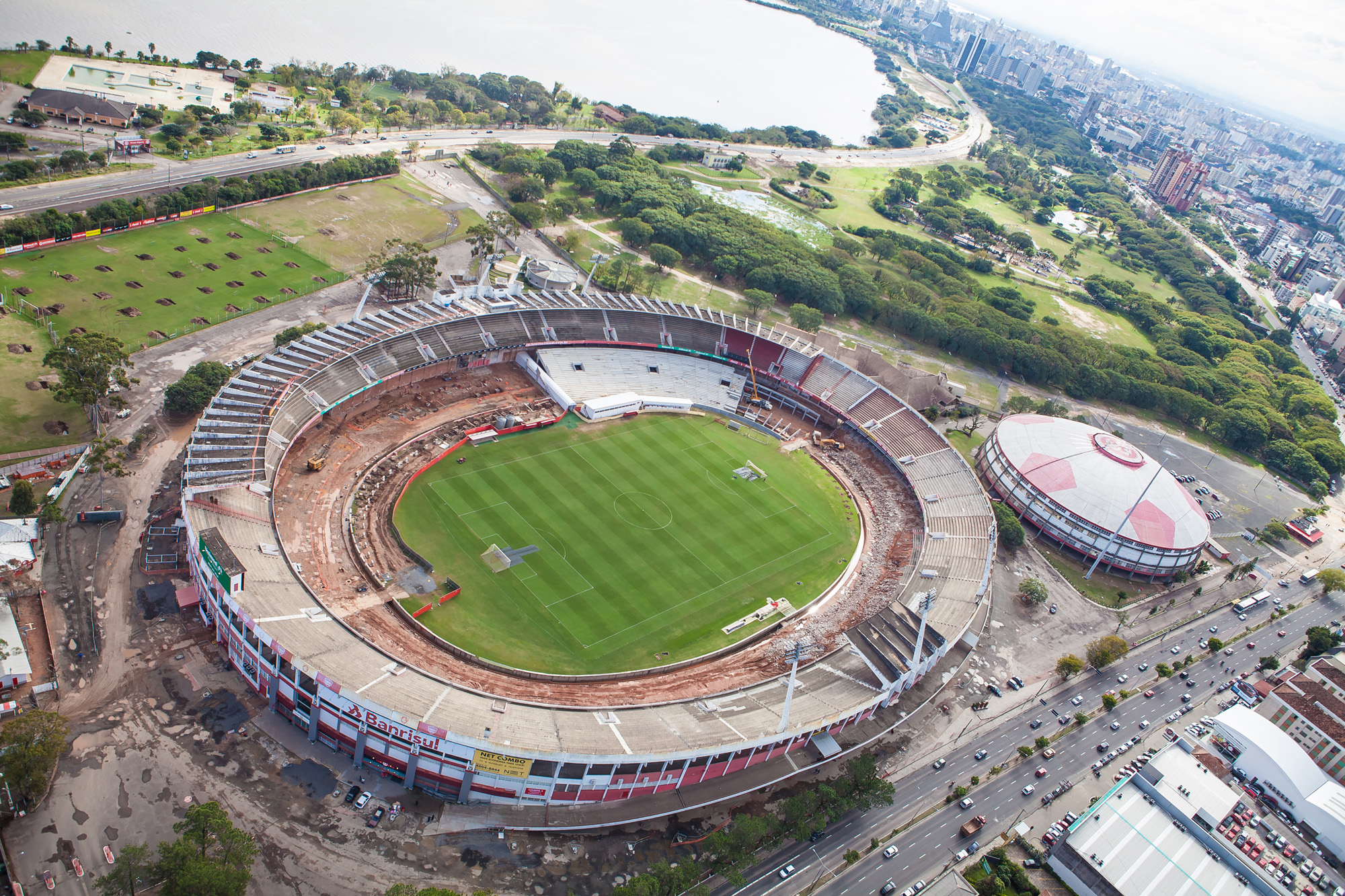
Beira-Rio during the renovation works in 2012.

Internacional was the top-seed of Group 5, which also contained Ecuador side Deportivo Quito and Emelec, as well as Cerro from Uruguay. In the 2010 season, Internacional finished first in their group, winning their three home matches and tying their away games, no least thanks to figures such as Kléber, Alecsandro, Giuliano and Argentine midfielder Andrés D'Alessandro. This saw the Colorados face off against Argentine champions Banfield; the series finished in a tight 3–3 scoreline, with Kléber's away goal in Banfield enough to send them through to the quarterfinals. In that stage, Internacional faced reigning champions Estudiantes, in a rematch of the 2008 Copa Sudamericana Finals. Despite dominating most of the first leg played in Porto Alegre, Internacional only managed a 1–0 win. In Argentina, Estudiantes were winning 2–0 until the 88th minute, when Giuliano, Internacional's star goalscorer, put the ball in the net to give Inter a much needed goal and see them through to the semifinals to meet São Paulo, in a rematch of the finals four years earlier. Again, Internacional only managed a 1–0 win at home despite dominating the game, and in São Paulo Alecsandro scored the decisive, away goal that saw Inter go through to their third final ever of the competition. Internacional won their second Copa Libertadores title after they defeated Guadalajara 1–2 in the first leg and 3–2 in the second leg to clinch a 5–3 aggregate win.

This victory gave Internacional the right to compete once again in the 2010 FIFA Club World Cup, with the goal of repeating the 2006 feat and becoming one of the very few Brazilian soccer clubs to have won the Club World Cup twice. However, they were eliminated in the semi-final by Congolese side TP Mazembe, the African champions, in a 0–2 upset that completely stunned Brazilian soccer specialists and fans, and also most international soccer observers.

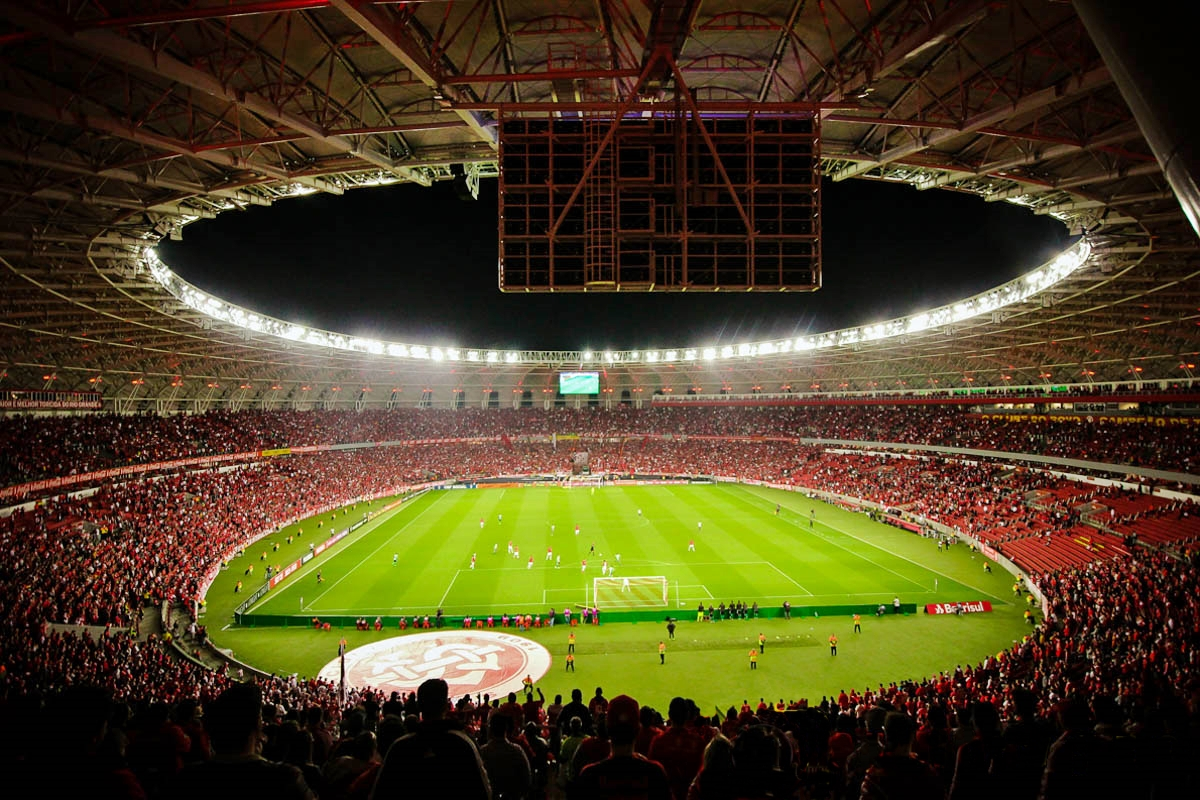
Renovated Beira-Rio Stadium, home of Sport Club Internacional.

Starting with minor works in 2011, the Beira-Rio stadium went through a complete renovation to receive matches of 2014 FIFA World Cup. The project named 'Giant Forever' went on full force in March 2012 when Inter partnership with Andrade Gutierrez took off, and lasted about two years. During this period, the home of the Colorados was adapted to the international football requirements and standards stipulated by FIFA, while maintaining the same structure and soul. The reopening was marked by a historic celebration show, along with a friendly match against Peñarol, who also participated in the inauguration tournament of the Stadium in 1969. Just like the Eucaliptos stadium in 1950, the home of Inter once again became a venue for a World Cup. International stars like Messi, Toni Kroos, Robben, and Benzema shone on the field during the five matches played there.

=== Relegation, financial trouble and restructure (2016–present) ===
After a successful start in the 2016 Campeonato Brasileiro Série A, Internacional started to struggle and experienced a 14-game winless streak, the longest in its history on the competition. The streak ended on 8 September with Inter's 2–1 comeback win over Santos. Two coaches had been fired up to that point: Argel Fucks, after losing to Santa Cruz, and the idol Falcão, who lasted just five games. To steer the team clear of relegation, the club's football department, now led by Fernando Carvalho, brought back Celso Roth. It was a move backed by another historical president of the club Ibsen Pinheiro.

But it didn't work. Roth took three matches to secure his first win, then needed another four to claim three points again. By the time Inter faced Figueirense in the first of two consecutive games at Beira-Rio, the team was stuck in the relegation zone. In a tough, scrappy match, backed by their fans, Inter managed a 1–0 victory, providing a much-needed boost to escape their difficult situation.

The team continued to struggle and Lisca was called as new manager, a last-ditch effort to rally the players. However, things took a turn for the worse in the 36th round. After Vitória, a direct rival in the fight against relegation, thrashed Figueirense on Sunday, Inter faced Corinthians at the Itaquerão needing a win. But a questionable penalty and a poor performance led to another defeat, virtually sealing their relegation to the second division.

Finally, on 11 December 2016, an apathetic Inter only managed a draw against Fluminense on a hot Sunday afternoon. Lacking energy, the team was dominated by the Rio side and showed no signs of breaking their winless streak away from home. The final whistle marked the darkest moment in Inter's history. With 38 games played, they had only 11 wins, 10 draws, and 17 losses, leading to relegation.

That led to the club's first relegation in its history, only ten years after winning the 2006 FIFA Club World Cup over a historical FC Barcelona team. Despite this setback, the club would eventually be promoted after finishing second in 2017 Campeonato Brasileiro Série B.

== Beira-Rio ==
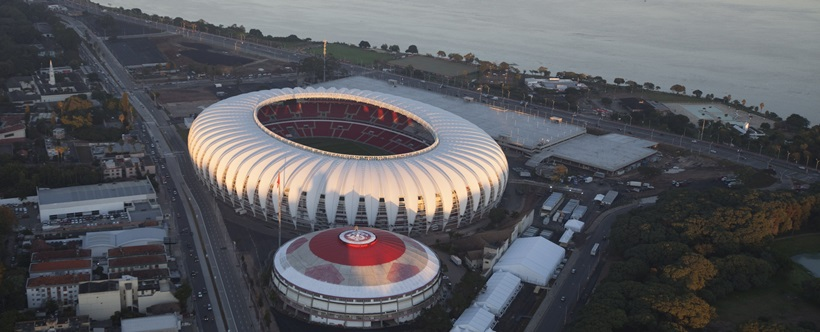
Beira-Rio's hosted most of Internacional's titles

Internacional plays its home games on its own stadium Beira-Rio. The stadium was built in the 1960s largely with the contribution of the fans, who brought bricks, cement, and iron for the construction and was inaugurated in April 1969.

The Beira-Rio underwent a major modernization process aimed at the 2014 World Cup. The works of the project, called 'Gigante Para Sempre' (Giant Forever), lasted about two years. The stadium was completely closed for renovations for the World Cup starting in December 2012. During this period, Inter had to make do with temporary homes, such as Estádio do Vale in Novo Hamburgo and Estádio Centenário in Caxias do Sul.

The stadium reinauguration took place in April 2014. Beira-Rio is now the second biggest stadium in the Rio Grande do Sul state and also South Brazil and can currently accommodate a total of 50,848 people. Additionally, a standing area introduced in early 2019 can now hold up 5,000 supporters.

The stadium hosted the last match in the finals of most of Inter's most important titles including the national titles of 1975,1976 and 1979, the 1992 Copa do Brasil, the 2006 and 2010 Copa Libertadores and 2008 Copa Sudamericana.

== Symbols ==
=== Crests ===
The first crest of Sport Club Internacional was designed with the initials SCI in red over a white background, without the red contour that appeared shortly afterward. In the Fifties, the colors were inverted, the initials written in white over a red background. Stars were added to crest after the 1975 and 1976 national titles, a third star accompanied by a silver laurel was placed above the symbol after the 1979 undefeated national title, the laurel would later be removed in the 1980s. A fourth star was added after the 1992 Copa do Brasil title.

After the club won the Copa Libertadores, the emblem gained another star which was 50% bigger was placed above the other four. However, Inter won the FIFA Club World Cup that same year, and the star symbolizing the Copa Libertadores title was moved down between the four stars representing the club's national honors, and a new diamond star was placed above it to commemorate the world crown. In 2007, after winning the Recopa Sudamericana, a crown was added to the crest to represent the clubs three international titles in a row, silver laurels were also added representing the Brasileirão titles as placed below the crest. This version of the crest was short lived, though, as in 2009, a circle with the name and year of foundation of the club were added around the traditional crest and the crown, laurels and stars were all removed for the club's centenary.

First crest, adopted at foundation.

Added circle, adopted in the 1910s

Colors were inverted in the late 1950s

Crest used to celebrate the second national title in 1976.

Crest used to celebrate the third national title in 1979, won undefeated.

Updated crest adopted in the 1980s.

Crest used to celebrate the Copa do Brasil title in 1992.

Crest used to celebrate the 2006 Libertadores title.

Crest used to celebrate the 2006 FIFA Club World Cup title.

Crest used to celebrate the international titles of 2006 and 2007.

Current crest, created for the club's centenary in 2009.

=== Flag ===
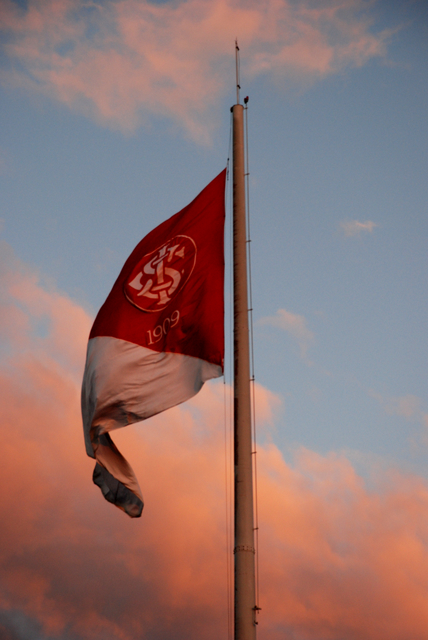
Internacional flag at Beira-Rio.

The flag of Sport Club Internacional consists of two right-angled triangles with the official colors red and white, with the red triangle having its base on the flagpole. In the upper corner, next to the flagpole, there is the club's crest and the founding year. At the Beira-Rio stadium, fans can behold a 110 square meters flag on a mast of 55 meters in height.

=== Saci ===
Initially, in the 1950s, the newspapers of the time created the figure of a little black boy wearing the Colorado jersey to represent Internacional and its popular and black fanbase in cartoons. The character later evolved to be a Saci, which was popularized by a drawing by Ziraldo. Like the black boy from the original cartoons, the main characteristic of Saci is mischief; he is very playful, enjoys teasing animals and people. He was adopted by Internacional as the club's mascot precisely because of these traits of "playing pranks on its opponents".

=== Anthem ===
Nélson Silva was a carioca from Rio de Janeiro, a composer from the slums, who lived in Porto Alegre. The musician first visited Rio Grande do Sul to perform with his musical group, Águias da Noite in the early 1940s. After the show, though, he never left. He became a radio host, with shows on TV Piratini and Farroupilha Radio, in addition to continuing to sing and play in nightclubs, but most importantly, he became an Internacional fan.

In 1956, Silva was listening to a match between Inter and Aimoré on the radio, a friendly held in São Leopoldo. He was distraught upon learning that his favorite team had lost 3-1. He was supposed to meet his girlfriend Ieda after the game to go to the cinema. But the game made him forget about his commitments that afternoon. He sat angrily at the table of a bar across the street, he began to write a hymn of praise to Inter, and that's how "Celeiro de Ases" (Barn of Aces) came to be.

The anthem stayed in a drawer at Farroupilha radio station for a long time, according to Turiassu Silva, Nelson's son. He showed it to some colleagues, the words spread, and eventually, it became popular among the fans. In 1966, the club launched a contest for the creation of an anthem. There were many candidates, but none of the anthems satisfied the Colorado soul like the one that was made on that angry afternoon by Nélson Silva, his composition soon became the formal song to celebrate the feelings of the Colorado fans.

In an interview for Internacional's newspaper in 1975, Nelson said that he never charged the club any amount for the use of the song. His greatest achievement, he said, was being known as the man who composed the Colorado anthem.

== First team ==
As of 1 November 2026

Note: Flags indicate national team as defined under FIFA eligibility rules; some limited exceptions apply. Players may hold more than one non-FIFA nationality.

No.	Pos.	Nation	Player
1	GK	URU	Sergio Rochet
3	DF	CHI	Guillermo Maripán
4	DF	ECU	Félix Torres (on loan from Corinthians)
5	MF	ARG	Rodrigo Villagra
6	DF	BRA	Matheus Bahia
7	FW	COL	Johan Carbonero
8	MF	BRA	Bruno Henrique
9	FW	BRA	Alerrandro (on loan from CSKA Moscow)
10	MF	BRA	Alan Patrick (captain)
11	FW	BRA	Kayky (on loan from Bahia)
12	GK	BRA	Anthoni
15	DF	BRA	Bruno Gomes
16	MF	BRA	Ronaldo

No.	Pos.	Nation	Player
17	FW	SWE	Niclas Eliasson (on loan from AEK Athens)
18	DF	BRA	Juninho
22	GK	BRA	Kauan Jesus
23	GK	BRA	Matheus Cunha (on loan from Cruzeiro)
25	DF	ARG	Gabriel Mercado (vice-captain)
26	DF	ARG	Alexandro Bernabei
27	MF	BRA	Paulinho
28	FW	BRA	Vitinho
29	MF	BRA	Thiago Maia
30	MF	BRA	Calebe (on loan from Fortaleza)
32	GK	BRA	Diego Esser
35	DF	ARG	Braian Aguirre
41	DF	BRA	Victor Gabriel

=== Youth players ===
Note: Flags indicate national team as defined under FIFA eligibility rules; some limited exceptions apply. Players may hold more than one non-FIFA nationality.

No.	Pos.	Nation	Player
24	GK	BRA	Filipe
31	MF	BRA	Allex
33	MF	GHA	Benjamin Arhin
37	FW	BRA	Yago Noal
39	FW	BRA	Carlos Eduardo
40	DF	BRA	Lázaro
43	DF	GHA	Denis Marfo
44	FW	BRA	João Victor
46	DF	BRA	Pedro Kauã

No.	Pos.	Nation	Player
48	FW	BRA	Raykkonen
49	FW	BRA	João Bezerra
50	MF	BRA	Kauan Alves
51	MF	BRA	Kempes
52	MF	BRA	Gabriel Vinicius
53	DF	BRA	Luiz Felipe
54	FW	BRA	Fabrício Prado
—	DF	BRA	Alisson
—	DF	BRA	João Dalla Corte

=== Out on loan ===
Note: Flags indicate national team as defined under FIFA eligibility rules; some limited exceptions apply. Players may hold more than one non-FIFA nationality.

No.	Pos.	Nation	Player
—	GK	BRA	Keiller (at Coritiba until 31 December 2026)
—	DF	BRA	Clayton Sampaio (at Fakel Voronezh until 30 June 2027)
—	DF	BRA	Ramon (at Vitória until 31 December 2026)

No.	Pos.	Nation	Player
—	MF	URU	Alan Rodríguez (at Rosario Central until 30 June 2027)
—	FW	BRA	Gabriel Barros (at América Mineiro until 30 November 2026)
—	FW	BRA	Gustavo Prado (at Dynamo Kyiv until 30 June 2027)

== Personnel ==
=== Technical staff ===
As of 22 September 2026

Role	Name
Head coach	Eduardo Baptista
Assistant coach	Pablo Fernandez
Fitness coach	Vacant
Goalkeeping coach	Rogério Maia
Goalkeeping coach	Eduardo Melgarejo
Executive director	Fabinho Soldado
Technical director	Abel Braga
Director of football	Felipe Dallegrave
Football supervisor	Adriano Loss
Analyst	Youssef Kanaan
Analyst	Yuri Salenave
Analyst	Manoel Shamah
Analyst	Felipe Ribeiro

=== Health and performance staff ===
Role	Name
Health coordinator	Luiz Crescente
Doctor	Guilherme Caputo
Doctor	Rodrigo Hoffmeister
Physiologist	Felipe Irala
Physiotherapist	Guilherme Bergamo
Physiotherapist	Marco Venturini
Physiotherapist	Mauro Matos
Performance assistant	Thales Medeiros
Nurse	Vladimir Dutra
Nutritionist	Maria Julia
Nutrition intern	Eduarda Dadalt
Nutrition intern	Rafaela Lima
Masseur	Juarez Quintanilha
Masseur	Paulo Renato da Silva

=== Management and support ===
Role	Name
President	Alessandro Pires Barcellos
Vice president	Dannie Dubin
Vice president	Arthur Caleffi
Vice president	Luiz Carlos Ribeiro Bortolini
Vice president	Humberto Cesar Busnello
General secretary	Mauri Luiz da Silva
Vice president of football	Felipe Becker
Vice president of social Relationship	Cauê Vieira
Vice president of patrimony and Administration	Victor Grunberg
Vice president of finances	Leandro Bergmann
Vice president juridical	Guilherme dos Reis Mallet
Vice president of planning	Carlos Otacilio Selbach Massena
Vice president of strategic business	Paulo Corazza
Vice president of marketing	Jorge Avancini
CEO	Giovane Zanardo
Logistics supervisor	Adriano Loss
Administrative supervisor	Pedro Klück
Market manager	Deive Bandeira
Scout	Henrique Lisboa
Scout	Ricardo Sobrinho
Scout	Rodrigo Weber

== Players statistics ==
- All-time Top Scorers

	Name	Years	Goals
1	(Brazil) Carlitos	1938–51	325
2	(Brazil) Bodinho	1951–58	235
3	(Brazil) Claudiomiro	1967–74, 1979	210
4	(Brazil) Valdomiro	1968–79, 1982	191
5	(Brazil) Tesourinha	1939–49	178
6	(Brazil) Larry	1954–61	176
7	(Argentina) José Villalba	1941–44, 1946–49	153
8	(Brazil) Ivo	1955–60	118
9	(Brazil) Jair	1974–81	117
10	(Brazil) Adãozinho	1943–51	108

- All-time most appearances

	Name	Years	App.
1	(Brazil) Valdomiro	1968–79, 1982	803
2	(Brazil) Bibiano Pontes	1965–75	523
3	(Argentina) Andrés D'Alessandro	2008–16, 2017–20, 2022	523
4	(Brazil) Dorinho	1964–75	460
5	(Brazil) Luiz Carlos Winck	1981–89, 1991, 1994	453
6	(Brazil) Claudiomiro	1967–74, 1979	420
7	(Brazil) Gainete	1962–64, 1966–71	410
8	(Brazil) Mauro Galvão	1979–86	393
9	(Brazil) Índio	2005–14	391
10	(Brazil) Falcão	1972–80	387

- Brazilian Championship Top Scorers

	Name	Years	Goals
1	(Brazil) Valdomiro	1971–79, 1982	59
2	(Brazil) Christian	1992, 1995–99, 2007	42
3	(Brazil) Fernandão	2004–08	42
4	(Argentina) Andrés D'Alessandro	2008–16, 2017-20	40
5	(Brazil) Jair	1974–81	37
6	(Brazil) Nilmar	2002–04, 2007–09, 2014-15	35
7	(Brazil) Rafael Sóbis	2004–06, 2010	34
8	(Brazil) Escurinho	1971–77	34
9	(Brazil) Bira	1979–82	35
10	(Brazil) Leandro Damião	2010–13	33

- Brazilian Championship most appearances

	Name	Years	App.
1	(Argentina) Andrés D'Alessandro	2008–16, 2017–20, 2022	250
2	(Brazil) Clemer	2002–09	210
3	(Brazil) Valdomiro	1971–79, 1982	208
4	(Brazil) Índio	2005–14	190
5	(Brazil) Edinho	2003–08	172
6	(Brazil) Falcão	1972–80	158
7	(Argentina) Pablo Guiñazú	2007–12	157
8	(Brazil) Kléber	2009–13	143
9	(Brazil) Bolívar	2003–06, 2009–12	141
10	(Chile) Elías Figueroa	1971–77	139

== Honours ==
=== Official tournaments ===
Worldwide
Competitions	Titles	Seasons
FIFA Club World Cup	1	2006
Continental
Competitions	Titles	Seasons
Copa Libertadores	2	2006, 2010
Recopa Sudamericana	2	2007, 2011
Copa Sudamericana	1	2008
International
Competitions	Titles	Seasons
Levain Cup-Sudamericana	1	2009
National
Competitions	Titles	Seasons
Campeonato Brasileiro Série A	3	1975, 1976, 1979
Copa do Brasil	1	1992
Torneio Heleno Nunes	1	1984
State
Competitions	Titles	Seasons
Campeonato Gaúcho	46	1927, 1934, 1940, 1941, 1942, 1943, 1944, 1945, 1947, 1948, 1950, 1951, 1952, 1953, 1955, 1961, 1969, 1970, 1971, 1972, 1973, 1974, 1975, 1976, 1978, 1981, 1982, 1983, 1984, 1991, 1992, 1994, 1997, 2002, 2003, 2004, 2005, 2008, 2009, 2011, 2012, 2013, 2014, 2015, 2016, 2025
Copa FGF	2^{s}	2009, 2010
Recopa Gaúcha	3	2016, 2017, 2026
Copa Governador do Estado	2	1978, 1991
Super Copa Gaúcha	1^{s}	2016

- record
- ^{s} shared record

=== Others tournaments ===
==== International ====
- Torneio Inauguração do Estádio Olímpico (1): 1954
- Copa Ciudad Viña del Mar (2): 1978, 2001
- Joan Gamper Trophy (1): 1982
- Trofeo Costa del Sol (1): 1983
- Europac Cup (1): 1983
- Pacific Coast Tournament (1): 1983
- Kirin Cup (1): 1984
- Glasgow International Tournament (1): 1987
- Trofeo Cidade de Vigo (1): 1987
- Ceuta Tournament (1): 1989
- Marlboro Cup (1): 1991
- Wako Denki Cup (1): 1992
- Sumitomo Cup (1): 1994
- Torneio de 25 Anos do Estádio Beira-Rio (1): 1994
- Torneio Mercosul (1): 1996
- Dubai Cup (1): 2008
- Peace Border Cup (1): 2010

==== National ====
- Torneio Régis Pacheco (Quadrangular de Salvador) (1): 1953
- Torneio Governador do Estado (Quadrangular de Campo Grande) (1): 1987
- Troféu João Saldanha (2): 2005, 2022
- Troféu Osmar Santos (1): 2009

==== State ====
- Copa Sul-Fronteira (1): 2016 (reserve team)
- Campeonato Gaúcho Série B (1): 2017 (reserve team)
- Taça Fábio Koff (2): 2009, 2010
- Taça Fernando Carvalho (1): 2009
- Taça Farroupilha (3): 2011, 2012, 2013
- Taça Piratini (1): 2013
- Torneio Início do Campeonato Gaúcho (1): 1966

==== City ====
- Campeonato Citadino de Porto Alegre (23): 1913, 1914 (LPAF), 1915 (LPAF), 1916, 1917, 1922 (APAD), 1927, 1934, 1936, 1940, 1941, 1942, 1943, 1944, 1945, 1947, 1948, 1950, 1951, 1952, 1953, 1955, 1972
- Torneio Início de Porto Alegre (14): 1921, 1922, 1929, 1932, 1934, 1937, 1938, 1940, 1941, 1942, 1943, 1957, 1960, 1966
- Torneio taça 14 de Julho (1): 1921
- Torneio Pão dos Pobres (1): 1926
- Torneio Sociedade Sul-Riograndense (1): 1927
- Torneio Ruy Barbosa (1): 1928
- Torneio Encerramento (4): 1929, 1934, 1937, 1940
- Torneio Dia do Desporto (3): 1933, 1934, 1940
- Torneio Flores da Cunha (1): 1934
- Taça Martel (1): 1938
- Torneio Dia do Filiado (1): 1938
- Torneio taca Fogões Geral (2): 1938, 1939
- Torneio Relâmpago (1): 1939
- Taça Diário de Notícias (1): 1939
- Torneio Triangular de Porto Alegre (1): 1945
- Torneio Extra de Porto Alegre (4): 1946, 1950, 1952, 1954
- Torneio da ACEPA (1): 1948
- Taça Casa Clark (1): 1949
- Troféu Bicentenário da Fundação de Porto Alegre (1): 1972

=== Runners-up ===
- Copa Libertadores (1): 1980
- Recopa Sudamericana (1): 2009
- Campeonato Brasileiro Série A (8): 1967, 1968, 1988, 2005, 2006, 2009, 2020, 2022
- Copa do Brasil (2): 2009, 2019
- Campeonato Brasileiro Série B (1): 2017
- Copa União (1): 1987
- Campeonato Gaúcho (24): 1936, 1962, 1963, 1964, 1966, 1967, 1968, 1977, 1980, 1985, 1986, 1987, 1988, 1989, 1993, 1995, 1998, 1999, 2006, 2010, 2017, 2019, 2021, 2026
- Recopa Gaúcha (2): 2014, 2015
- Super Copa Gaúcha (1): 2013

=== Youth team ===
- Campeonato Brasileiro Sub-23 (3): 2010, 2017, 2019
- Campeonato Brasileiro Sub-20 (1): 2020
- Copa do Brasil Sub-20 (1): 2014
- Supercopa do Brasil Sub-20 (1): 2021
- Copa São Paulo de Futebol Júnior (5): 1974, 1978, 1980, 1998, 2020
- Copa Rio Grande do Sul de Futebol Sub-20 (2): 2006, 2013
- Copa Santiago de Futebol Juvenil (14): 1990, 1992, 1993, 2001, 2003, 2005, 2007, 2009, 2010, 2011, 2012, 2013, 2014, 2017
- Copa Macaé de Juvenis (3): 2000, 2001, 2005
- Copa Votorantim Sub-15 (2): 2009, 2011

== See also ==
- Sport Club Internacional (women)
- List of world champion football clubs
