= Claudiomiro (footballer, born 1950) =

Brazilian footballer

Personal information
- Full name: Claudiomiro Estrais Ferreira
- Date of birth: April 3, 1950
- Place of birth: Porto Alegre
- Date of death: August 24, 2018 (aged 68)
- Place of death: Canoas
- Position: Forward

Senior career*
Years	Team	Apps	(Gls)
1967–1974	Internacional	424	(210)
1975	Botafogo		
1976–1977	Flamengo		
1977–1978	Caxias		
1979	Internacional		
1979	Novo Hamburgo		

International career
1971	Brazil	6	(1)
- * Club domestic league appearances and goals

Claudiomiro Estrais Ferreira (3 April 1950 – 24 August 2018), better known as just Claudiomiro, was a Brazilian football forward who played for several Série A clubs.

== Career ==
Born in Porto Alegre, Rio Grande do Sul, Claudiomiro played for several Série A clubs, and he scored Estádio Beira-Rio's first goal on April 6, 1969. He won the Campeonato Gaúcho six times with Internacional.

=== National team ===
He played six games for the Brazil national team in 1971. He scored his only goal on July 24, 1971, against Paraguay.

== Honors ==
=== Club ===
Internacional

- Campeonato Gaúcho: 1969, 1970, 1971, 1972, 1973, 1974
