= Jorge Vitório =

Brazilian footballer (born 1945)

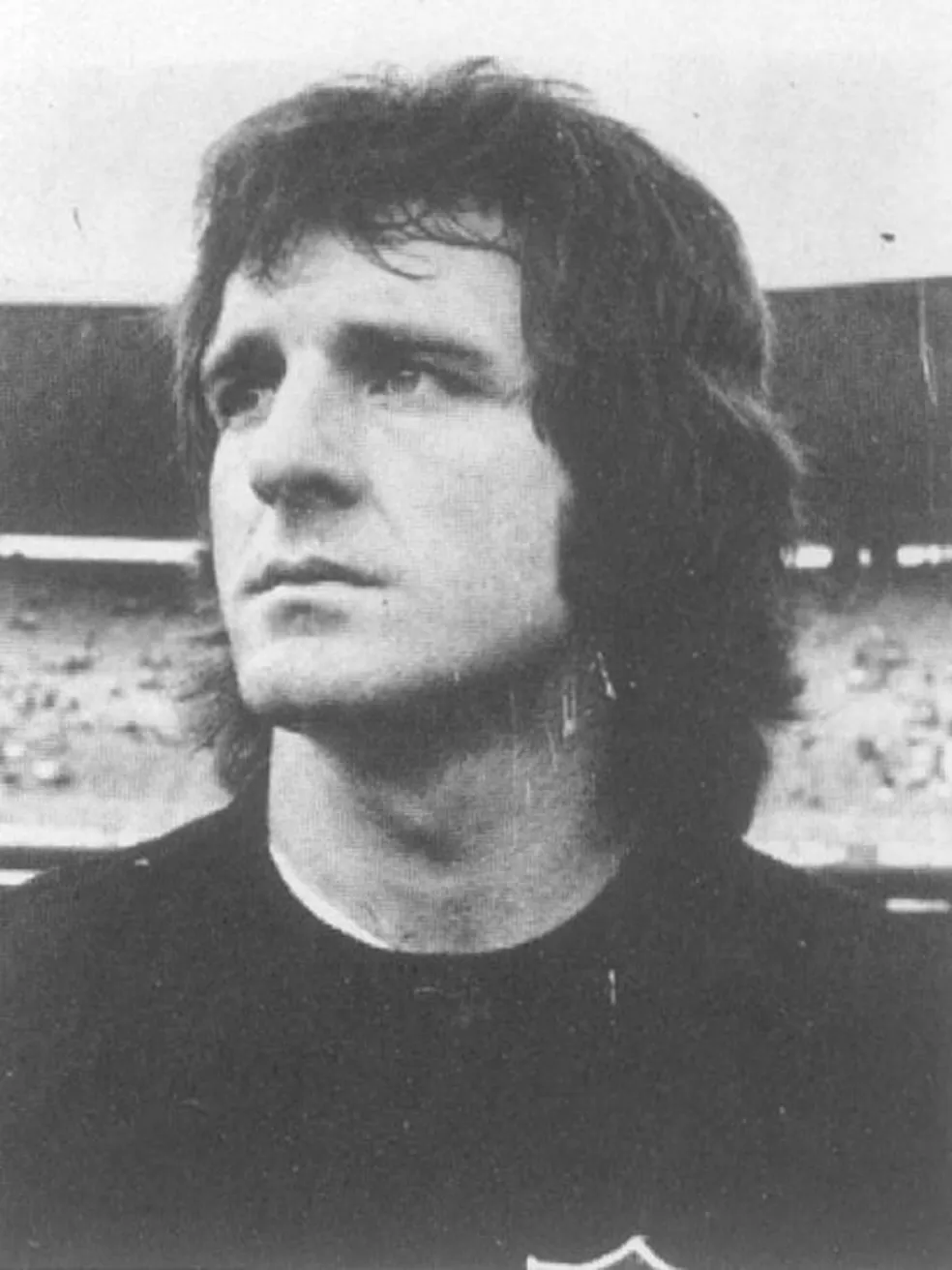

Personal information
- Full name: Jorge Vitório Cusielo
- Date of birth: 7 May 1945 (age 81)
- Place of birth: Volta Redonda, Rio de Janeiro, Brazil
- Position: Goalkeeper

Youth career
- ???–1964: Guarani de Volta Redonda
- 1964–1965: Fluminense

Senior career*
Years	Team	Apps	(Gls)
1965–1974	Fluminense	184	(0)
1974	→ Olaria (loan)		
1975–1976	Vitória		
1977–1980	Vila Nova		
1977	→ CEUB (loan)		
1977	→ Pelotas (loan)		

Managerial career
- 1979–1981: Vila Nova
- 1982–1984: Volta Redonda
- 1986–1988: Oman
- * Club domestic league appearances and goals

Jorge Vitório Cusielo (born 7 May 1945), more commonly known as just Jorge Vitório or Vitório is a retired Brazilian football player and manager. He was most known for playing as a goalkeeper for Fluminense throughout the late 1960s and into the early 1970s. He would also coach varios clubs throughout the 1980s, including the Oman national football team from 1986 to 1988.

== Career as a player ==
Jorge Vitório began his youth career by playing for Guarani de Volta Redonda before catching the interest of Fluminense to play for their youth sector beginning in 1964 following interest from Corinthians. He would later sign a contract to play professionally for the club on 26 February 1965. He would quickly be a part of the starting XI for the club as he would be a part of the winning squad for the 1966 Campeonato Carioca as well as the 1966 Taça Guanabara. This would change in 1968 following the arrival of Félix as he would become a reserve for the club for the remainder of his career with Fluminense. Over the course of his remaining career with Fluminense, he was a part of the winning squads for the 1969, 1971 and 1973 editions of the Campeonato Carioca, of the Guanabara Cup in 1966, 1969 and 1971 editions of the Taça Guanabara as well as being a part of the winning squad for the club's first national title during the 1970 Campeonato Brasileiro Série A. During his later career with the club, he would be the main goalkeeper for the club following Félix's participation in the 1970 FIFA World Cup as well as his injury during the 1972 Campeonato Brasileiro Série A. He possessed a height of 1.83 m and weighed 81 kg as a professional player.

During a friendly against Argentinian club River Plate on 3 February 1972. During the match, a brawl within the pitch would break out between the two clubs due to a prior stemming feud between the two clubs. Vitório would be one of the earliest participants after his teammate Oliveira after he fell whilst running past the bench of River Plate with the reserves beating him up through kicks with Vitório being one of the first players to relieve his teammate. He would then gave a flying kick to defender Héctor Isaac Rodríguez after he had begun throwing punches against his teammates Silveira and Sérgio Cosme as a pitch invasion would later occur with Fluminense fans rushing in to assist their players. This would result in referee Valquir Pimentel ending the match prematurely as he would then expulse Vitório, Cafuringa and Mickey of Fluminense and René Daulte, Jorge Gabriel Vázquez, Raúl Giustozzi, César-Auguste Laraignée, Joaquín Pedro Martínez and Alfredo Granato of River Plate although he would later rescind all of these suspensions with the exception of Daulte.

He would also be a part of an international tour across Angola, Zambia, Tanzania, Mozambique and Lesotho. At this point, he would make 184 appearances for the club with 95 wins, 44 draws and 45 losses, conceding 166 goals, an average of 0.8 per match.

During the 1974 season, he would be loaned out to play for Olaria. This was due to how despite being a well-liked player by the end of the 1973 season, new club manager Duque would take issue with Jorge Vitório would persistently harass him until his departure. He would then play for Vitória in 1975 with his debut match being a 5–0 home victory against Venezia in a friendly. He intended to return to Fluminense following Duque's departure but during negotiations between Fluminense and his new club of Vitória during the season, Fluminense would also want Mário Sérgio to play for their club but Vitória would only accept either one player to be transferred to the club and in the end, Fluminense would choose Mário Sérgio. He would then stay for another season with the club, citing his frustrations with Fluminense. Following several salary problems and arrears, when his friend Edgardo Andrada would arrive for the 1976 season, they would alternate every two games following one of the two faking their injuries until the club would find out and removed him from the squad. This resulted in Jorge Vitório filing a lawsuit against the club in where he would win and be transferred to play for Vila Nova beginning in 1977. He would be a part of the winning squad for the 1977 Campeonato Goiano. He would also be loaned out to briefly play for CEUB for three months and Pelotas.

== Career as a manager ==
During his later career with Vila Nova, he served as a player-manager until 1981. He would follow this up with him overseeing Volta Redonda from 1982 to 1984. He would finally go abroad to coach the Oman national football team from 1986 to 1988.
