= René Daulte =

Argentinian footballer (born 1950)

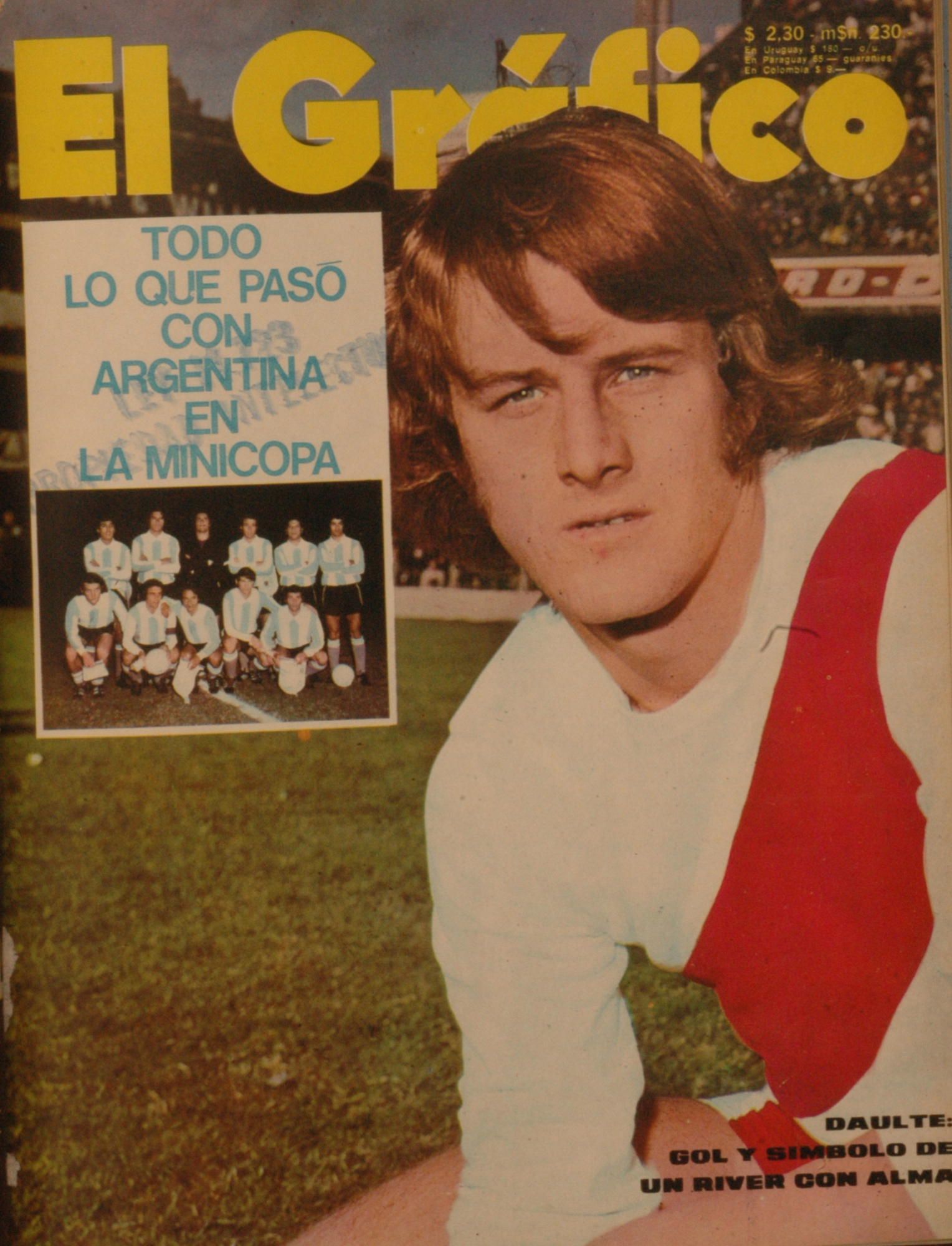
- Dualte in 1972

Personal information
- Full name: René Daulte
- Date of birth: 16 March 1950 (age 76)
- Place of birth: Vicente López, Buenos Aires, Argentina
- Position: Defender

Youth career
- 1967–1970: River Plate

Senior career*
Years	Team	Apps	(Gls)
1971–1973	River Plate	79	(8)
1974	Gimnasia	5	(0)
1975–1978	Mulhouse		
1978	Huracán	23	(0)
1979–1981	Tampico Madero		
- * Club domestic league appearances and goals

René Martín Daulte (born 16 March 1950) is a retired Argentinian footballer. Nicknamed "Polaco", he played as a defender for River Plate and Mulhouse throughout the 1970s.

== Career ==
Daulte hailed from a family that were fans of his future club River Plate but he would initially be a fan of Racing Club but during the 1967 Copa Libertadores finals in where Daulte would be attend, the manager of River Plate's youth sector Osvaldo Diez was also present. Noting how Daulte had a striking resemblance to Roberto Perfumo and Coco Basile. He would subsequently offer him a position in the club's youth sector and despite Daulte having an initial interest in rugby, would fully switch over to play as a football player as he would play with and later befriend Reinaldo Merlo in the youth ranks.

He would make his first senior appearance during the 1971 Argentine Primera División as a part of a project by club manager Didi to promote several youth players to the senior squad alongside his teammates Héctor Isaac Rodríguez, Pablo Zuccarini, Alfredo Granatto, Mario Finarolli and Norberto Alonso. During a friendly against Fluminense on 3 February 1972, a brawl would break out between the two clubs following prior bad relations between the two clubs with the tipping point being when several River Plate players would begin to beat up Oliveira after he had tripped by the River Plate substitute bench. Daulte would be suspended alongside his teammates Jorge Gabriel Vázquez, Raúl Giustozzi, César-Auguste Laraignée, Joaquín Pedro Martínez and Alfredo Granato as well as Fluminense players Jorge Vitório, Cafuringa and Mickey. All of these suspensions would later be lifted with the exception of Daulte, as he would be forced to miss out on a few matches due to his participation.

Despite this setback, he would find success for the remainder of the 1972 season as the club would be runners-up for the 1972 Campeonato Nacional where he would play in the Starting XI and qualify for the 1973 Copa Libertadores. This would be his final season with the club as in the beginning of the 1974 Argentine Primera División, he would play for Gimnasia alongside goalkeeper Carlos Barisio a year later but would have a brief career at only five appearances the entire season. Despite this, Daulte would be sought out by Mulhouse to play for the next three seasons for the club. He would return to Argentina in 1978 to play for Huracán with his debut match being a 0–1 loss against Quilmes. He would make 23 appearances for the club with his final match being a 1–2 defeat to Atlético Tucumán on 20 December 1978. He spent the last few seasons as a player with Tampico Madero in Mexico until his retirement by the end of the 1980–81 Mexican Primera División season.

== Later life ==
With his friend Merlo later becoming a manager, Daulte would follow him as an assistant. He would be a part of the staff that would help Racing Club to end their 36 year long drought without a title in a major upset.
