= Little Maracanazo =

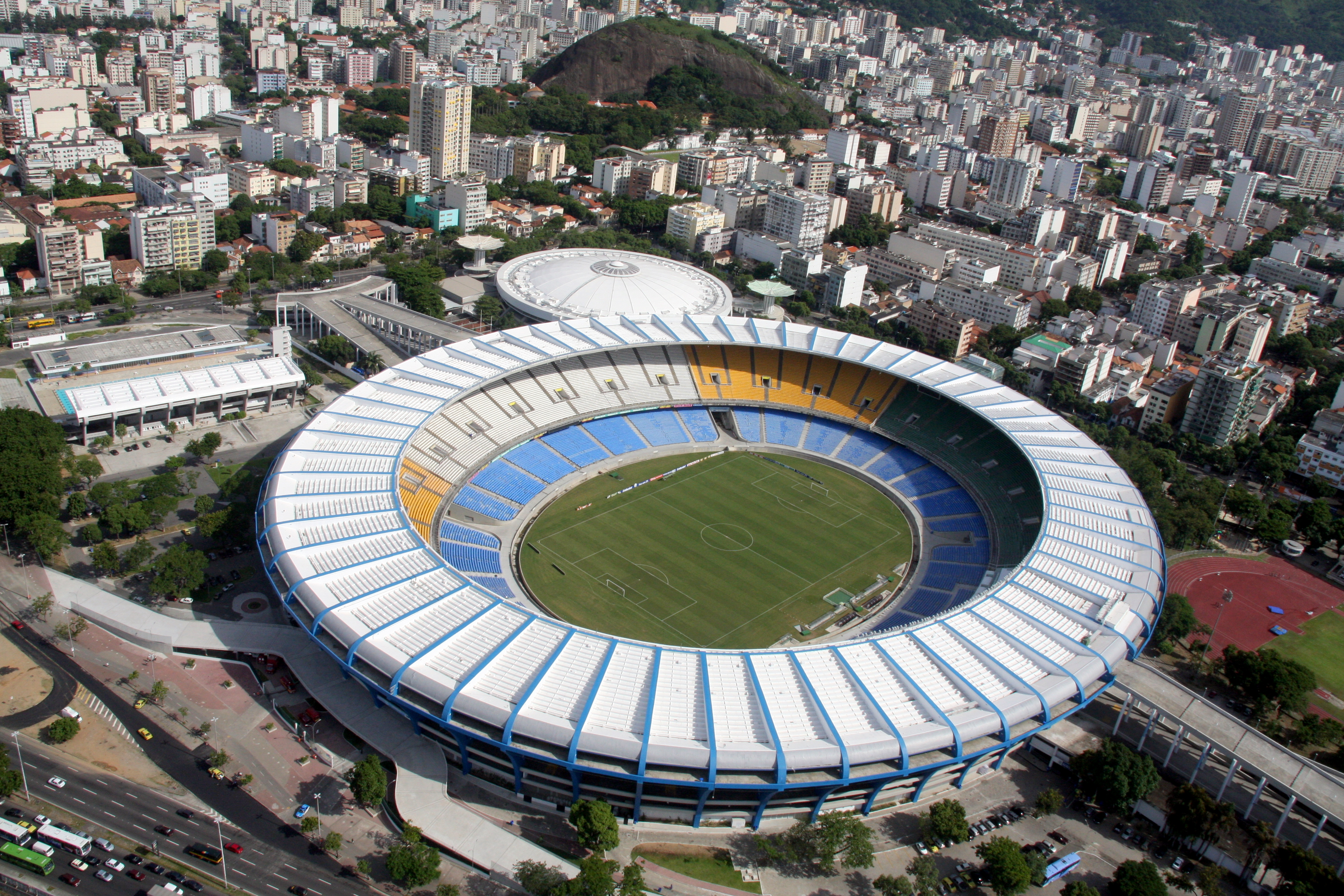
- Maracana Stadium, venue of the match
- Event: 1971 Copa Libertadores
Fluminense	Deportivo Italia
(Brazil)	(Venezuela)
0	1
- Date: 3 March 1971
- Venue: Maracanã Stadium, Rio de Janeiro
- Referee: Rodolfo Pérez Osorio (Paraguay)

Little Maracanazo was a football match played between Fluminense FC of Brazil and Deportivo Italia of Venezuela in the group stage of the 1971 Copa Libertadores. Fluminense, managed by Mário Zagallo who had just won the 1970 World Cup, were defeated 1–0.

== History ==
Deportivo Italia was Venezuela's Champion of the 1971 season. The Italo-Venezuelan team traveled to the Maracanã Stadium and took home a 1:0 victory against the Fluminense FC. The goal was scored by central defender Tenorio. The Fluminense of famous Lobo Zagallo, Champion of Brazil, was defeated that year for the first time in its own Maracanã.

The Caracas daily El Universal wrote that:

the night of 3 March 1971 will never be forgotten by the fans of Fluminense, who followed on radio and television the match against Deportivo Italia. More than 26,000 people went to the Maracana. The modest Venezuelan team, thrashed in their own field in the previous match, did what no none could do for over a year, not even the powerful Brazilian teams: defeat the Fluminense in their Maracana. That fateful night, Deportivo Italia achieved the victory more enjoyable in the Venezuelan national football history, winning in the largest stadium in the world the Champion of Brazil as did −21 years before- the Uruguay national team....(Numa partida que passou na televisão e nas rádios e diante 26.000 espectadores, a Azzurra Venezuelana derrotou o invicto tricolor, campeão brasileiro da época e segundo os venezuelanos esta é umas das maiores glórias do futebol do país de todos os tempos, ao derrotar uma das maiores equipes brasileiras no maior estádio do mundo, assim como haviam feito os uruguaios 21 anos antes, claro que nas suas devidas proporções).Eduardo Cacela

The Deportivo Italia – under the direct supervision of Mino D'Ambrosio (who ruled the team with his brother Pompeo D'Ambrosio)– that night went to the match with Vito Fasano (who for his performance was recruited in Brazil, Vito is Italian) as goalkeeper. At the defence there were Carlos "Chiquichagua" Marín, Tenorio, Vincente Arrud and Freddy Elie, while as midfielders Delman "Pito" Useche, Negri and Rui. In the attack played Alcyr (who was replaced by Bahia), Beto and Militello.

In the magazine "Incontri" of Caracas, Bruno D'Ambrosio (grandson of Mino who attended the match) wrote that in the final half hour the goalkeeper Vito Fassano did miracles: three hits to the poles helped him, but while two knocked externally the door defended by Fassano, the third would have been a goal if the goalkeeper had not deflected it with his fingers stretching in an incredible way. Fassano made the best game of his life, according to all the persons who saw the match.

Santander Laya-Garrido, who wrote the book "Los Italianos forjadores de la nacionalidad y del desarrollo economico en Venezuela", said (like others in many newspapers and magazines that since then no other Venezuela football team has obtained a similar international result: until now the "Little Maracanazo" is the top international victory in the history of the soccer in Venezuela.

The victory was received by the Italians of Venezuela with street car caravans in Caracas and it was celebrated by the "La Voce d'Italia" (the main newspaper of the local Italian community) with a special edition The Brazilian newspaper “Jornal Dos Sport” published the next day an article complaining about this disaster of the powerful Fluminense, champion of Brasil, while pinpointing that the Fluminense vice-president died of a heart attack during the match.

After 45 years the Venezuelan newspaper "Ultimas Noticias" still celebrated the victory in 2016 (even if the name of the italo-venezuelan team has been changed to Deportivo Miranda).

== Match details ==
1971 Copa Libertadores
3 March 1971
First stage

Fluminense (Brazil)	0–1	(Venezuela) Deportivo Italia
		Tenorio 66' (pen.)

Maracanã Stadium, Rio de Janeiro
Referee: Rodolfo Pérez Osorio (Paraguay)

Fluminense
Deportivo Italia

GK	(Brazil) Jorge Vitório
RB	(Brazil) Oliveira
CB	(Brazil) Galhardo
CB	(Brazil) Assis
LB	(Brazil) Marco Antônio
MF	(Brazil) Samarone
MF	(Brazil) Denílson
MF	(Brazil) Didi	(substituted off) 46'
RW	(Brazil) Cafuringa
CF	(Brazil) Flávio
LW	(Brazil) Lula	(substituted off) 71'
Substitutions:
	(Brazil) Silveira	(substituted on) 46'
	(Brazil) Wilton	(substituted on) 71'
Manager:
(Brazil) Mário Zagallo

GK	(Venezuela) Vito Fassano
DF	(Venezuela) Carlos Marín
DF	(Haiti) Freddy Elie
DF	(Brazil) Manuel Tenorio
DF	(Venezuela) Vicente Arruda
MF	(Venezuela) Delmán Useche
MF	(Brazil) Rui da Costa
MF	(Brazil) Alcyr Freitas	(substituted off) 80'
FW	(Peru) Osman Bendezu
FW	(Brazil) Beto
FW	(Venezuela) Nelson Militello
Substitutions:
	(Brazil) Baiano	(substituted on) 80'
Manager:
(Brazil) Elmo Correa

== Aftermath ==
The Associated Press published internationally the following report about the match history the next day:

The Venezuelans, to whom little possibilities were assigned, practiced a perfect defensive game. His goalkeeper, Vito Fassano, had extraordinary interventions in the second stage and saved his fence of goals that were already acclaimed by the local fans. The winning goal came in the 66th minute: Pito Useche passed the ball to Militello, who entered the box, dribbled a defender and goalkeeper Vitorio knocked him down. The Paraguayan referee Osorio whistled penalty. Brazilian central defender Tenorio took the penalty and sent the ball to the net. In the second half when Fluminense made their dominance more intense, the visitors again and again distanced the danger from their penalty area and controlled the two most skilled players of the Brazilian team: Flavio and Cafuringa (Los Venezolanos, a quienes se le asignaban escasas posibilidades, practicaron un juego defensivo perfecto. Su arquero, Vito Fassano, tuvo intervenciones extraordinarias en la segunda etapa y salvó su valla de goles que ya eran aclamados por la afición local. El gol del triunfo llegó en el minuto 66: Pito Useche le pasó el balón a Militello, quien entró al área, dribló a un defensa y el portero Vitorio lo derribó. El árbitro paraguayo Osorio pitó penal. El zaguero central brasileño Tenorio cobró el penal y mandó el balón a las redes. En el segundo tiempo cuando Fluminense hizo más intenso su dominio, los visitantes alejaron una y otra vez el peligro de su área penal y marcaron a los dos jugadores más diestros del equipo brasileño: Flavio y Cafuringa)

== Bibliography ==
- Briceño, Javier. Años de ensueño: la Era D'Ambrosio (de "Un sueño llamado Deportivo Petare"). Universidad Católica Andres Bello (Publicaciones y tesis). Caracas, 2013 ()
