= Paulo Lumumba (footballer, born 1943) =

Brazilian footballer

Personal information
- Full name: Paulo do Nascimento Ribeiro
- Date of birth: 19 September 1943 (age 83)
- Place of birth: Rio de Janeiro, Brazil
- Position: Defender

Senior career*
Years	Team	Apps	(Gls)
1964–1967	Flamengo	26	(0)
1967–1970	Bonsucesso		
1970–1972	Fluminense	23	(0)
1972–1973	Bahia		
1973–1974	CEUB		
1974–1976	Bangu		
- * Club domestic league appearances and goals

Paulo do Nascimento Ribeiro (born 19 September 1943), better known as Paulo Lumumba, is a Brazilian former professional footballer who played as a defender.

== Career ==
Defender, Paulo Lumumba played for Flamengo, where he made 26 appearances, and for Fluminense FC, where he was part of the champion squad of the 1970 Roberto Gomes Pedrosa Tournament. He also had spells at Bonsucesso, Bahia, CEUB-DF and Bangu. After retiring, he worked as a goalkeeper trainer for Bangu.

== Honours ==
Fluminense

- Torneio Roberto Gomes Pedrosa: 1970
- Campeonato Carioca: 1971
- Taça Guanabara: 1971
