= Didi (footballer, born 1950) =

Brazilian footballer (born 1942)

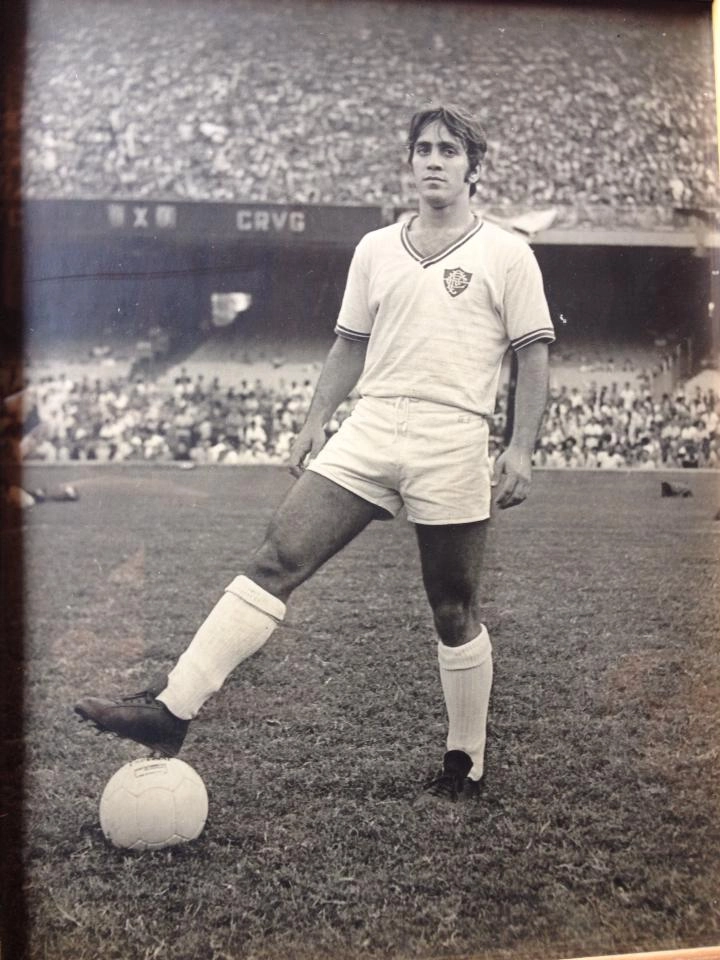
- Didi in 1970

Personal information
- Full name: Adir Cid Rodrigues
- Date of birth: 27 August 1950 (age 76)
- Place of birth: Santos, São Paulo, Brazil
- Position: Defensive midfielder

Youth career
- ???–1965: Santos
- 1965–1968: Fluminense

Senior career*
Years	Team	Apps	(Gls)
1969–1973	Fluminense	144	(3)
1973–1974	Vitória		
1974–1975	Portuguesa Santista		
1975–1976	Santos	42	(3)
1976–1978	Deportivo Toluca		
1978–1979	Jalisco		
1979	Ceará		
1980–1981	Francana		
- * Club domestic league appearances and goals

Adir Cid Rodrigues (born 27 August 1950), better known as Didi, is a retired Brazilian footballer. Also nicknamed "Ouro branco", he played for Fluminense as a defensive midfielder throughout the early 1970s and was part of the winning squad for the 1970 Campeonato Brasileiro Série A. He also played abroad in Mexico at Liga MX, playing for Deportivo Toluca throughout the latter half of the decade.

== Career ==
Didi began his career within the youth section of Santos. However, his footballing trajectory would change as during a game between Santos and Portuguesa, at just 15 years of age, Didi was discovered by Fluminense supervisor Roberto Alvarenga and alongside Marco Antônio, made the switch to the Fluminense youth team. Former Fluminense footballer Pinheiro would be the main driving force to push the club to convince them to promote Didi to the senior squad for the upcoming 1969 Campeonato Brasileiro Série A. His inaugural season saw him win the 1969 Campeonato Carioca with this success continuing into the 1970s as he won the 1970 Campeonato Brasileiro Série A as well as the 1971 Campeonato Carioca as he would play until 1973 with a final record of 144 appearances and three goals.

Following his career with the Tricolor, he had a series of brief stints with Vitória, Portuguesa Santista and his old club Santos. During his tenure with the Alvinegro, the club was experiencing a financial crisis following Pelé's departure for the New York Cosmos and Didi decided to play abroad for Deportivo Toluca in Mexico. Following an additional season for Jalisco throughout the 1978–79 season, he returned to Brazil to spend the remainder of his career with Ceará and Francana before his retirement in 1981.

== Personal life ==
Didi later married Ariadne Valdez and had three children with her: Vanessa, Danielle and Adir Agustin. He is also the grandfather of four granddaughters: Camila and Constanza, from Vanessa, and Valentina and Natalia from Danielle.
