= Héctor Isaac Rodríguez =

Argentine footballer (born 1950)

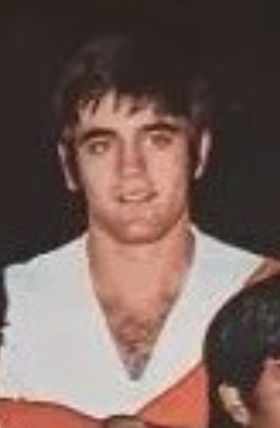
- Rodríguez in 1971

Personal information
- Full name: Héctor Isaac Rodríguez
- Date of birth: 1950 (age 75–76)
- Place of birth: Buenos Aires, Argentina
- Position: Central defender

Youth career
- ???–1970: River Plate

Senior career*
Years	Team	Apps	(Gls)
1971–1973	River Plate	34	(1)
1973	→ Chaco For Ever (loan)	10	(0)
1974–1975	Quilmes		
1976	Tigre		
1977–1979	Defensores de Belgrano	48	(11)
Total		73	(15)
- * Club domestic league appearances and goals

Héctor Isaac Rodríguez (born 1950) is a retired Argentinian footballer. He played as a defender for various clubs throughout the 1970s as he was most well known for playing for River Plate in the early 1970s.

== Career ==
Rodríguez would debut for the senior squad of River Plate as a part of a project by club manager Didi to promote several players from the youth sector into the senior squad. He would mostly play in friendlies throughout his brief tenure with the club. One of these friendlies would be an infamous match against Fluminense on 3 February 1972 as a brawl would break out shortly after several River Plate players began to beat up Oliveira with the players of both teams joining in as Rodríguez would throw punches against Silveira and Sérgio Cosme before receiving a flying kick from Fluminense goalkeeper Jorge Vitório. Following a pitch invasion from Fluminense fans that resulted in the match being called off prematurely, Rodríguez was expulsed from the match alongside his teammates Rene Daulte, Jorge Gabriel Vázquez, Raúl Giustozzi, César-Auguste Laraignée, Joaquín Pedro Martínez and Alfredo Granato although these suspensions would later be lifted with the exception of Daulte. He then scored a goal during a friendly against Almagro on 14 March 1972 in a 2–0 victory.

By the time of the end of his tenure with the club, he would make 34 appearances for the club with a single goal. He would then be loaned out to Chaco For Ever where he would make 10 appearances for the club. Throughout the mid 1970s, he would play for Quilmes and Tigre. He would finish his career with Defensores de Belgrano for the 1977 and 1978 seasons, making 48 appearances and scoring 11 goals.
