= Mickey (Brazilian footballer) =

Brazilian footballer (1948–2024)

Personal information
- Full name: Adalberto Kretzer
- Date of birth: 19 March 1948
- Place of birth: Presidente Getúlio, Santa Catarina, Brazil
- Date of death: 24 August 2024 (aged 76)
- Place of death: Camboriú, Santa Catarina, Brazil
- Height: 1.81 m (5 ft 11 in)
- Position: Forward

Youth career
- –1966: Caxias-SC

Senior career*
Years	Team	Apps	(Gls)
1966–1969	Caxias-SC		
1967	→ Palmeiras-SC (loan)		
1969–1974	Fluminense	98	(27)
1972	→ Grêmio (loan)	8	(1)
1972	→ Junior Barranquilla (loan)		
1973	→ Deportivo Cali (loan)		
1974	→ Bonsucesso (loan)		
1974	Olaria		
1975–1976	Bahia		
1976–1979	São Paulo	45	(17)
1978	→ Ceará (loan)		
1979	Avaí		
- * Club domestic league appearances and goals as of 5 October 2023

Adalberto Kretzer (19 March 1948 – 24 August 2024), better known as Mickey, was a Brazilian professional footballer who played as a forward.

== Career ==
Formed at Joinville-based Caxias, became a hero at Fluminense, when he was featured in the final games of the 1970 Torneio Roberto Gomes Pedrosa and scored his team's winning goals on two matches. The nickname "Mickey" came from the size of his ears. He was called "the peace and love scorer", as he celebrated goals by making a "V" with his fingers.

== Personal life and death ==
Mickey lived in the city of Balneário Camboriú, where he worked as a real estate agent until he retired.

Mickey died in Camboriú, Santa Catarina, on 24 August 2024, at the age of 76.

== Honours ==
Fluminense

- Torneio Roberto Gomes Pedrosa: 1970
- Campeonato Carioca: 1969, 1971, 1973
- Taça Guanabara: 1969, 1971

Bahia

- Campeonato Baiano: 1975, 1976

São Paulo

- Campeonato Brasileiro: 1977
- Torneio Nunes Freire: 1976

Ceará

- Campeonato Cearense: 1978

Individual

- 1976 Campeonato Baiano top scorer: 19 goals
