= 1970 São Paulo FC season =

São Paulo
1970 season
- Chairman: Laudo Natel
- Manager: Zezé Moreira
- Torneio Roberto Gomes Pedrosa: First stage
- Campeonato Paulista: Champions (9th title)
- Top goalscorer: League: Pedro Rocha (4); All: Toninho Guerreiro (17)

The 1970 football season was São Paulo's 41st season since club's existence.

== Statistics ==
=== Scorers ===
Position	Nation	Playing position	Name	Torneio Roberto Gomes Pedrosa	Campeonato Paulista	Taça São Paulo	Others	Total
1	(Brazil)	FW	Toninho Guerreiro	1	13	1	2	17
2	(Brazil)	FW	Terto	3	4	0	2	9
3	(Brazil)	DF	Dias	0	1	1	5	7
=	(Brazil)	MF	Miruca	0	2	2	3	7
4	(Brazil)	FW	Babá	2	0	0	3	5
=	(Brazil)	MF	Édson	2	3	0	0	5
5	(Brazil)	MF	Carlos Alberto	0	1	1	2	4
=	(Uruguay)	DF	Pablo Forlán	0	3	0	1	4
=	(Uruguay)	MF	Pedro Rocha	4	0	0	0	4
=	(Brazil)	FW	Zé Roberto	1	0	0	3	4
6	(Brazil)	MF	Lourival	0	0	2	1	3
=	(Brazil)	MF	Paraná	0	1	0	2	3
7	(Brazil)	MF	Gérson	1	0	0	1	2
8	(Brazil)		Paulo	0	0	0	1	1
=	(Brazil)	MF	Paulo Nani	0	1	0	0	1
=	(Brazil)		Pio	0	0	1	0	1
=	(Brazil)		Válter	0	0	0	1	1
			Total	14	29	8	30	81

== Overall ==
Games played	61 (18 Campeonato Paulista, 16 Torneio Roberto Gomes Pedrosa, 27 Friendly match)
Games won	23 (12 Campeonato Paulista, 3 Torneio Roberto Gomes Pedrosa, 8 Friendly match)
Games drawn	20 (3 Campeonato Paulista, 5 Torneio Roberto Gomes Pedrosa, 12 Friendly match)
Games lost	18 (3 Campeonato Paulista, 8 Torneio Roberto Gomes Pedrosa, 7 Friendly match)
Goals scored	81
Goals conceded	69
Goal difference	+12
Best result	8–0 (H) v Mitsubishi - Friendly match - 1970.02.01
Worst result	0–4 (A) v Santos - Friendly match - 1970.03.21
Top scorer	Toninho Guerreiro (17)

Source: São Paulo FC

== Friendlies ==
Jan 25 International	São Paulo (Brazil)	1–1	(Portugal) Porto	São Paulo
	Miruca 35'		Vieira Nunes 32'	Stadium: Estádio Cícero Pompeu de Toledo (Morumbi); Attendance: 100.000; Referee: José Favilli Neto

Feb 1 Reader's Digest Trophy	São Paulo (Brazil)	8–0	(Japan) Mitsubishi Heavy Industries	São Paulo
	Zé Roberto 8', 70', 81'; Carlos Alberto 13'; Gérson 18'; Dias 32'; Miruca 34', 53'			Stadium: Estádio Cícero Pompeu de Toledo (Morumbi); Referee: Wilmar Serra

Feb 28 National	Marília	1–3	São Paulo	Marília
	Goal		Goal	Stadium: Municipal

Mar 18 National	Nacional	0–2	São Paulo	São Paulo
			Válter 16'; Babá 36'	Stadium: Estádio Nicolau Alayon; Referee: Dulcídio Wanderley Boschilia

Mar 28 National	São Paulo	0–0	Atlético Mineiro	São Paulo
				Stadium: Estádio Cícero Pompeu de Toledo (Morumbi); Attendance: 2,971; Referee: José Favilli Neto

Apr 5 National	Atlético Mineiro	2–2	São Paulo	Belo Horizonte
	Amauri 6'; Laci 20'		Babá 27'; Terto 53'	Stadium: Estádio Governador Magalhães Pinto (Mineirão); Referee: Juan de la Pasión

May 1 International	São Paulo (Brazil)	1–2	(Bulgaria) CSKA Sofia	São Paulo
	Lourival 24'		Atanazou 73'; Grigorov 90'	Stadium: Estádio Cícero Pompeu de Toledo (Morumbi); Referee: José de Oliveira

May 5 International	Saint-Étienne (France)	3–2	(Brazil) São Paulo	Saint-Étienne
	Herbim 58', 64'; Lima 89' (o.g.)		Dias 15'; Toninho Guerreiro 20'	Attendance: 10,000

May 9 International	Rouen (France)	0–1	(Brazil) São Paulo	Rouen
			Toninho Guerreiro 71'	Attendance: 5,000

May 11 International	Standard Liège (Belgium)	0–0	(Brazil) São Paulo	Rocourt, Liège
				Attendance: 4,000; Referee: Ryon

May 13 International	Metz (France)	3–1	(Brazil) São Paulo	Metz
	Krawzyck 14'; Nenê 31' (o.g.); Lassalette 83'		Carlos Alberto 79'	Stadium: Stade Saint-Symphorien; Attendance: 5,000; Referee: René Fedespiel

May 15 International	Hamburg (West Germany)	2–0	(Brazil) São Paulo	Hamburg
	Zazyk 46', 62'			Stadium: Volksparkstadion; Attendance: 5,000

May 19 International	HNK Hajduk Split (Socialist Federal Republic of Yugoslavia)	0–0	(Brazil) São Paulo	Split
				Attendance: 8,000; Referee: M. Madir

May 21 International	Partizan Belgrade (Socialist Federal Republic of Yugoslavia)	3–3	(Brazil) São Paulo	Beograd
	Vukotic 6'; Bjekovic 47'; Mihaklovic 88'		Dias 30'; Forlán 61'; Babá 76'	Referee: Djurdejevic

May 26 International	Red Star (France)	0–1	(Brazil) São Paulo	Paris
			Paraná 44'	Attendance: 7,200; Referee: Morelo

Jun 13 International	São Paulo (Brazil)	2–0	(Uruguay) Peñarol	São Paulo
	Dias 2'; Paraná 69'			Stadium: Estádio Cícero Pompeu de Toledo (Morumbi); Attendance: 1,218; Referee: Vilmar Serra

Jun 20 National	XV de Piracicaba	1–3	São Paulo	Piracicaba
	Nicanor 48'		Paulo 2'; Terto 7'; Dias 24'	Stadium: Estádio Barão da Serra Negra; Attendance: 730; Referee: Dulcídio Wanderley Boschilia

Nov 14 National	Fluminense	3–0	São Paulo	Maceió
	Lula 25'; Flávio 41', 44'			Stadium: Estádio Rei Pelé; Referee: Dirceu Arruda

Nov 25 International	Peñarol (Uruguay)	0–2	(Brazil) São Paulo	Montevideo
			Toninho Guerreiro 20'; Pedro Rocha 25'	Stadium: Centenario; Referee: Telmo Palumbo

=== Taça São Paulo ===
Mar 7 National	São Paulo	2–2	Corinthians	São Paulo
	Lourival 70'; Miruca 87'		Benê 52'; Tales 82'	Stadium: Estádio Cícero Pompeu de Toledo (Morumbi); Attendance: 9,923; Referee: José Favilli Neto

Mar 15 National	São Paulo	1–1	Portuguesa	São Paulo
	Toninho Guerreiro 36'		Ratinho 42'	Stadium: Estádio Cícero Pompeu de Toledo (Morumbi); Referee: José de Oliveira

Mar 21 National	Santos	4–0	São Paulo	Santos
	Manoel 2', 51'; Picolé 16'; Djalma Duarte 53'			Stadium: Estádio Urbano Caldeira (Vila Belmiro); Referee: Albino Zanferari

Apr 1 National	Palmeiras	1–1	São Paulo	São Paulo
	Copeu 42'		Pio 87' (o.g.)	Stadium: Estádio Palestra Itália (Parque Antarctica); Attendance: 4,099; Referee: Wilmar Serra

Apr 15 National	São Paulo	1–2	Santos	São Paulo
	Carlos Alberto 64'		Pitico 33'; Léo 87'	Stadium: Estádio Palestra Itália (Parque Antarctica); Referee: José Favilli Neto

Apr 18 National	Portuguesa	1–1	São Paulo	São Paulo
	Basílio 8'		Miruca 14'	Stadium: Estádio Palestra Itália (Parque Antarctica); Referee: Alcir Sanches

Apr 21 National	São Paulo	1–1	Palmeiras	São Paulo
	Dias 34'		Jaime 7'	Stadium: Estádio Cícero Pompeu de Toledo (Morumbi); Referee: Oscar Scolfaro

Apr 24 National	Corinthians	1–1	São Paulo	São Paulo
	Benê 29'		Lourival 82'	Stadium: Estádio Palestra Itália (Parque Antarctica); Referee: Emídio Marques de Mesquita

== Official competitions ==
=== Campeonato Paulista ===
Jun 28 Round 1	São Paulo	1–0	São Bento	São Paulo
	Miruca 12'			Stadium: Estádio Cícero Pompeu de Toledo (Morumbi); Referee: Vilmar Serra

Jul 1 Round 2	Portuguesa	2–1	São Paulo	São Paulo
	Leivinha 3'; Geraldino 77'		Dias 49'	Stadium: Estádio Palestra Itália (Parque Antarctica); Attendance: 6,150; Referee: Aldo Olvideo

Jul 5 Round 3	Ponte Preta	2–2	São Paulo	Campinas
	Alan 58'; Manfrini 85'		Terto 7'; Toninho Guerreiro 72'	Stadium: Estádio Moisés Lucarelli; Referee: Arnaldo César Coelho

Jul 12 Round 4	Santos	2–3	São Paulo	São Paulo
	Edu 37'; Douglas 57'		Carlos Alberto 22' (o.g.); Miruca 36'; Édson 71'	Stadium: Estádio Palestra Itália (Parque Antarctica); Attendance: 22,601; Referee: Armando Marques

Jul 16 Round 5	São Paulo	2–1	Ferroviária	São Paulo
	Toninho Guerreiro 61', 70'		Zé Luís 88'	Stadium: Estádio Palestra Itália (Parque Antarctica); Referee: Dulcídio Wanderley Boschilia

Jul 19 Round 6	São Paulo	1–1	Corinthians	São Paulo
	Toninho Guerreiro 9'		Lima 53'	Stadium: Estádio Cícero Pompeu de Toledo (Morumbi); Referee: Aldo Ovinedo

Jul 26 Round 7	Botafogo	1–2	São Paulo	Ribeirão Preto
	Carlos Augusto 26'		Édson 6'; Terto 74'	Stadium: Estádio Santa Cruz; Attendance: 6,209; Referee: Oscar Scolfaro

Jul 29 Round 8	Palmeiras	0–1	São Paulo	São Paulo
			Terto 33'	Stadium: Estádio Palestra Itália (Parque Antarctica); Referee: Armando Marques

Aug 2 Round 9	São Paulo	0–0	Guarani	São Paulo
				Stadium: Estádio Cícero Pompeu de Toledo (Morumbi); Attendance: 11,363; Referee: Emídio Marques de Mesquita

Aug 9 Round 10	São Paulo	3–2	Santos	São Paulo
	Toninho Guerreiro 42', 70'; Terto 82'		Douglas 28', 88'	Stadium: Estádio Cícero Pompeu de Toledo (Morumbi); Referee: Aldo Ovinedo

Aug 16 Round 11	Ferroviária	2–0	São Paulo	Araraquara
	Muri 24'; Nei 90'			Stadium: Estádio Doutor Adhemar de Barros (Fonte Luminosa); Referee: Oscar Scolfaro

Aug 19 Round 12	São Paulo	1–0	Portuguesa	São Paulo
	Forlán 2'			Stadium: Estádio Cícero Pompeu de Toledo (Morumbi); Attendance: 12,553; Referee: Rámon Barreto

Aug 23 Round 13	São Paulo	0–1	Palmeiras	São Paulo
			Dudu 4'	Stadium: Estádio Cícero Pompeu de Toledo (Morumbi); Referee: Oscar Scolfaro

Aug 26 Round 14	São Paulo	4–0	Botafogo	São Paulo
	Forlán 11'; Toninho Guerreiro 22', 37', 57'			Stadium: Estádio Cícero Pompeu de Toledo (Morumbi); Referee: Rámon Barreto

Aug 30 Round 15	São Bento	0–3	São Paulo	Sorocaba
			Toninho Guerreiro 26'; Forlán 30'; Édson 41'	Stadium: Estádio Humberto Reale; Referee: Arnaldo César Coelho

Sep 5 Round 16	São Paulo	2–0	Ponte Preta	São Paulo
	Toninho Guerreiro 31', 51'			Stadium: Estádio Cícero Pompeu de Toledo (Morumbi); Referee: Arnaldo César Coelho

Sep 9 Round 17	Guarani	1–2	São Paulo	Campinas
	Vagner 67'		Toninho Guerreiro 27'; Paulo Nani 34'	Stadium: Estádio Brinco de Ouro da Princesa; Attendance: 17,766; Referee: Armando Marques

Sep 13 Round 18	Corinthians	0–1	São Paulo	São Paulo
			Paraná 19'	Stadium: Estádio Cícero Pompeu de Toledo (Morumbi); Referee: Vital Loraux

==== Record ====
Final Position	Points	Matches	Wins	Draws	Losses	Goals For	Goals Away	Win%
1st	27	18	12	3	3	29	15	75%

=== Torneio Roberto Gomes Pedrosa ===
Sep 20 First stage 1	São Paulo	0–2	Palmeiras	São Paulo
			Edu 9'; Ademir da Guia 14'	Stadium: Estádio Cícero Pompeu de Toledo (Morumbi); Referee: Rámon Barreto

Sep 27 First stage 2	São Paulo	0–2	Flamengo	São Paulo
			Nei; Fio	Stadium: Estádio Cícero Pompeu de Toledo (Morumbi); Referee: Sebastião Rufino

Oct 4 First stage 3	Bahia	1–0	São Paulo	Aracajú
	Carlinho 88'			Stadium: Estádio Lourival Baptista (Batistão); Referee: Arnaldo César Coelho

Oct 7 First stage 4	Santa Cruz	0–2	São Paulo	Recife
			Terto 18'; Zé Roberto 68'	Stadium: Estádio Adelmar da Costa Carvalho (Ilha do Retiro); Referee: José de Assis Aragão

Oct 11 First stage 5	Corinthians	2–1	São Paulo	São Paulo
	Aladim 40'; Benê 48'		Terto 28'	Stadium: Estádio Cícero Pompeu de Toledo (Morumbi); Referee: Romualdo Arppi Filho

Oct 17 First stage 6	São Paulo	0–0	Grêmio	São Paulo
				Stadium: Estádio Cícero Pompeu de Toledo (Morumbi); Referee: Arnaldo César Coelho

Oct 22 First stage 7	Fluminense	1–1	São Paulo	Rio de Janeiro
	Marco Antônio 18'		Gérson 78'	Stadium: Estádio Jornalista Mário Filho (Maracanã); Referee: Armando Marques

Oct 25 First stage 8	Atlético Paranaense	0–2	São Paulo	Curitiba
			Pedro Rocha 63'; Babá 78'	Stadium: Estádio Belfort Duarte; Referee: José Vinhas

Oct 28 First stage 9	America-RJ	1–1	São Paulo	Rio de Janeiro
	Marciano 62'		Édson 26'	Stadium: Estádio Jornalista Mário Filho (Maracanã); Referee: José Luís Barreto

Oct 30 First stage 10	São Paulo	3–1	Ponte Preta	São Paulo
	Pedro Rocha 6', 13'; Babá 48'		Ditinho 59'	Stadium: Estádio Cícero Pompeu de Toledo (Morumbi); Referee: Rámon Barreto

Nov 4 First stage 11	São Paulo	1–2	Botafogo	São Paulo
	Pedro Rocha 18'		Paulo César 12'; Nei 67'	Stadium: Estádio Municipal Paulo Machado de Carvalho (Pacaembu); Referee: Arnaldo César Coelho

Nov 7 First stage 12	Vasco da Gama	1–1	São Paulo	Rio de Janeiro
	Dé 75'		Toninho Guerreiro 15'	Stadium: Estádio Jornalista Mário Filho (Maracanã); Attendance: 14,610; Referee: Agomar Martins

Nov 11 First stage 13	Atlético Mineiro	0–0	São Paulo	Belo Horizonte
				Stadium: Estádio Governador Magalhães Pinto (Mineirão); Referee: José Pereira

Nov 22 First stage 14	Internacional	2–0	São Paulo	Porto Alegre
	Valdomiro 23', 85'			Stadium: Estádio José Pinheiro Borba (Beira-Rio); Referee: José Mário Vinhas

Nov 29 First stage 15	Santos	3–2	São Paulo	São Paulo
	Pelé 12'; Nenê 32'; Douglas 85'		Terto 34'; Édson 64'	Stadium: Estádio Municipal Paulo Machado de Carvalho (Pacaembu); Referee: Aldo Ovinedo

Dec 6 First stage 16	São Paulo	0–2	Cruzeiro	São Paulo
			Tostão 11', 88'	Stadium: Estádio Cícero Pompeu de Toledo (Morumbi); Referee: Armando Marques

==== Record ====
Final Position	Points	Matches	Wins	Draws	Losses	Goals For	Goals Away	Win%
14th	11	16	3	5	8	14	20	34%
