= Toninho (footballer, born 1948) =

Brazilian footballer

Personal information
- Full name: Antônio Dias dos Santos
- Date of birth: June 7, 1948
- Place of birth: Vera Cruz, Bahia State, Brazil
- Date of death: December 8, 1999 (aged 51)
- Height: 1.80 m (5 ft 11 in)
- Position: Fullback

International career
Years	Team	Apps	(Gls)
1976–1979	Brazil	17	(0)

Antônio Dias dos Santos (June 7, 1948 in Vera Cruz, Bahia State, Brazil – December 8, 1999), best known as Toninho, was a Brazilian footballer who played as a defender.

During his career (1968–1982), Toninho played for clubs São Cristovão-BA, Galícia, Fluminense, Flamengo, Bangu and in Saudi Arabia with Al-Nassr. He won five Campeonato Carioca (1971, 1973, 1975, 1978, 1979), one Campeonato Brasileiro Série A in 1980, one Saudi League and one King Cup in 1981.

For the Brazil national football team he played 26 international matches and scored 3 goals from April 1976 to October 1979, and participated at the 1978 FIFA World Cup. He died in 1999 at only 51 years old.

== Honours ==
Galícia

- Campeonato Baiano: 1968

Fluminense

- Campeonato Brasileiro: 1970
- Campeonato Carioca: 1971, 1973, 1975

Flamengo

- Campeonato Brasileiro: 1980
- Campeonato Carioca: 1978, 1979, 1979 (Special)
