= Galhardo (footballer) =

Brazilian footballer (born 1942)

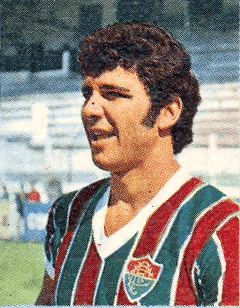

Personal information
- Full name: João José Galhardo
- Date of birth: 29 November 1942 (age 83)
- Place of birth: Araraquara, São Paulo, Brazil
- Position: Central defender

Youth career
- 1958–1961: Ferroviária

Senior career*
Years	Team	Apps	(Gls)
1962–1965	Ferroviária		
1965–1968	Corinthians	87	(1)
1969–1971	Fluminense	164	(0)
- * Club domestic league appearances and goals

João José Galhardo (born 29 November 1942), better known as Galhardo is a retired Brazilian footballer. He played as defender for Ferroviária, Corinthians and Fluminense throughout the 1960s and the early 1970s.

== Career ==
Born as the son of João Galhardo Filho and Maria Michiline Galhardo in Araraquara, Galhardo began his career within the youth sector of Ferroviária in 1958 following the encouragement of friend and club manager Picolín. Climbing up the ranks, in 1961, he signed to play for the professional team in the following 1962 season. Despite initially playing as a left-back, he later switched to playing as a central defender following the 1962 Campeonato Paulista due to his large stature. During his tenure with Ferroviária, he would play alongside other distinguished players such as Geraldo Scalera and Fogueira. His moderate success would nonetheless attract the attention of various clubs within the São Paulo area as mid-season, he would sign with Corinthians for their 1965 season under a 25 million cruzeiro contract. Despite this, his debut wouldn't be until 2 March 1966 in a 3–0 loss against Vasco da Gama. Throughout his tenure with the club, he later developed a friendship with club legend Nêgo. He later participated in the 1966 Torneio Rio-São Paulo where the club would reach runners-up. He would remain in Parque São Jorge until their 1968 season in 87 matches consisting of 50 wins, 16 draws, 21 defeats and only 1 goal scored. His final match was in a 4–1 defeat against his old club of Ferroviária on 1 June 1968, entering as a substitute for Clóvis Queiroz.

He played for Fluminense beginning in the 1969 season, being part of both the annual Taça Guanabara as well as the 1969 Campeonato Carioca. Despite being from São Paulo, Galhardo had secretly been a fan of the Rio-based club since he was a child. The 1970 season would prove to be his best season as he contributed towards the club winning the national title of the 1970 Campeonato Brasileiro Série A. This success continued into 1971 season as he won the Taça Guanabara as well as the Campeonato Carioca that year. He then chose to retire before the 1972 season due to an egregious leg injury during a game against Bahia throughout the tail end of the 1971 season. Even with Telê Santana offering him a position to play for recent Brazil national champions Atlético Mineiro, Galhardo persisted in retiring from his professional career following the discovery of one of his ligaments being severely injured.

== International career ==
Galhardo briefly represented his home country of Brazil in an unofficial friendly against Arsenal on 16 November 1965 where the English club would win 2–0.

== Later life ==
During his tenure with Fluminense, Galhardo met his future wife, Selma. He later worked as a monitor of football schools and also worked as a salesman. He currently resides in his hometown of Araraquara. In 2016, an anonymous user impersonated Galhardo through a fake Facebook account. His daughter, Ariane would later resolve the problem, quickly reporting the account to site officials.
