= Oliveira (footballer, born 1944) =

Brazilian footballer (1944–2000)

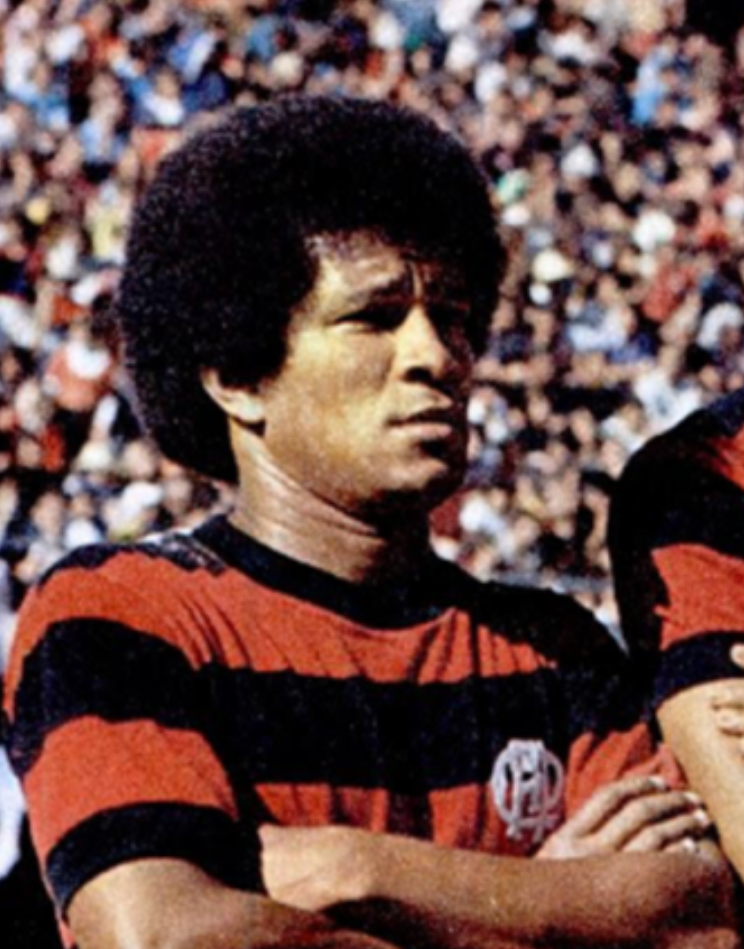
- Oliveira in 1975

Personal information
- Full name: Raimundo Evandro da Silva Oliveira
- Date of birth: 4 March 1944
- Place of birth: Belém, Pará, Brazil
- Date of death: 12 January 2000 (aged 55)
- Place of death: Belém, Pará, Brazil
- Position: Right back

Youth career
- 1961–1962: Paysandu

Senior career*
Years	Team	Apps	(Gls)
1963–1965	Paysandu		
1966–1973	Fluminense	346	(8)
1973–1974	Coritiba		
1975	Atlético Paranaense		
1976	CSA		
- * Club domestic league appearances and goals

Raimundo Evandro da Silva Oliveira (4 March 1944 – 12 January 2000), more commonly known as simply Oliveira was a Brazilian footballer. He played as a right back for various clubs throughout the 1960s and the 1970s, notably playing for Fluminense around that era.

== Career ==
Oliveira would begin his career with Paysandu both as a youth as well as his early senior career, playing throughout the early 1960s. He would later sign with Fluminense for their 1966 season following the departure of club legend Carlos Alberto Torres. Known for playing as a discreet, excellent scorer as well as a good supporter, he would play alongside other players such as Roberto Pinto, Marco Antônio, Denílson, Cafuringa, Samarone and Lula. He was also characterized by his ball lifting abilities as during the final of the 1971 Campeonato Carioca against Botafogo on 27 June 1971, within the 43rd minute of the match, a free kick was granted to Cafuringa who then passed the ball to Oliveira as he would make a cross that would end up causing Marco Antônio and Botafogo goalkeeper Ubirajara Motta to clash with each other without the ball fully crossing the line. With the goal and ball unattended, Lula pushed the ball in the goal. Despite protests from the Botafogo players to annul the goal, referee José Marçal Filho would ultimately deem the goal as valid.

Throughout his career with Fluminense, Oliveira would be a part of the winning squads for the 1966, 1969 and 1971 editions of the Taça Guanabara, the 1969, 1971 and 1973 editions of the Campeonato Carioca as well as be a part of the club's first national title during the 1970 Campeonato Brasileiro Série A. He would also take part in a friendly between Fluminense and River Plate held at the Estádio General Severiano on 3 February 1972. The two teams had already had bad ties due to prior incidents involving River Plate with a brawl commencing following several River Plate players repeatedly kicking Oliveira after he tripped whilst running past the benches of the opposing team and his teammates reinforcing him. This would result in several players in both sides being subsequently expulsed as well as the match ending prematurely following a pitch invasion by several Fluminense fans joining in to join their players in the brawl. Be the time of his departure in 1973, he would make 346 appearances for the club and scoring 8 goals, enjoying consistent success within the Starting XI of the club.

He would then play for Coritiba, Atlético Paranaense and CSA for the remainder of his career until his retirement in 1976.

== Personal life ==
Oliveira died on 12 January 2000 with his son Miguel Batista da Silva Filho surviving him.
