= Samarone (footballer) =

Brazilian footballer (born 1946)

Personal information
- Full name: Wilson Gomes
- Date of birth: 3 March 1946 (age 79)
- Place of birth: Santos, Brazil
- Height: 1.77 m (5 ft 10 in)
- Position: Midfielder

Senior career*
Years	Team	Apps	(Gls)
1963–1965	Portuguesa Santista		
1965–1971	Fluminense		
1971	Corinthians		
1971–1973	Flamengo		
1973–1974	Portuguesa de Desportos		
1975	Bonsucesso		
- * Club domestic league appearances and goals

Wilson Gomes (born 3 March 1946), best known by the nickname Samarone, was a Brazilian former professional footballer who played as a midfielder.

Samarone started at Portuguesa Santista, where he scored the title goal of the 1964 2nd Division Championship Paulista. He transferred to Fluminense in 1965.

Samarone played 211 matches for Fluminense, with 109 wins, 41 draws and 61 defeats, scoring 51 goals, playing for Flu until March 1971. With a powerful kick that became famous as "Os canhões de Samarone", in reference to the successful film at the time "The Guns of Navarone", also being known as the "Blonde Devil". Carioca Champion in 1969 and 1971 and the 1970 Brazilian Championship.

Despite being elected the best player in the 1970 Brazilian Championship, of which Fluminense was champion, Samarone never had a chance in the Brazilian team, which at the time had great competition with Pelé, Rivellino, Dirceu Lopes, Gérson, among other players competing for the position. He received the nickname "White Pelé". Samarone had two cases of hepatitis and a distortion in the ligaments in his left knee, which hampered his career. Furthermore, in 1971 Fluminense hired coach Mário Zagallo, with whom there was no affinity.

So, Samarone went to Corinthians, where he stayed for a short time. He then went to wear Flamengo number 10 shirt, where Zico was still wearing number 9. He stayed at Flamengo for a short time, because Zagallo also arrived there. He was then loaned to Portuguesa, where he left to return to Rio de Janeiro and later end his career at Bonsucesso in 1975.

== Honours ==
=== Portuguesa Santista ===
- Série A2 Championship Paulista: 1964.

=== Fluminense ===
- Brazilian Championship: 1970
- Carioca Championship: 1969, 1971
- Taça Guanabara: 1966, 1969
- Torneio Quadrangular Pará-Guanabara: 1966
- Taça Independência - (Fla-Flu): 1966
- Troféu Jubileu de Prata - (Fluminense versus Combinado de Volta Redonda): 1966
- Taça Francisco Bueno Netto (Fluminense versus Palmeiras 1ª edição): 1968
- Taça Associación de La Prensa (Esporte Clube Bahia-BA versus Fluminense): 1969
- Taça João Durval Carneiro (Fluminense de Feira-BA versus Fluminense): 1969
- Taça Francisco Bueno Netto (Fluminense versus Palmeiras 2ª edição): 1969
- Troféu Fadel Fadel - (Fla-Flu): 1969
- Troféu Brahma Esporte Clube: 1969
- Troféu Independência do Brasil - (Fla-Flu): 1970
- Taça Francisco Bueno Netto (Fluminense versus Palmeiras 3ª edição): 1970
- Taça ABRP-Associação Brasileira de Relações Públicas 1950-1970 (Fluminense versus Vasco): 1970
- Taça Globo (Fluminense versus Clube Atlético Mineiro): 1970

== individual awards ==
- Bola de Prata (Placar) - bests players in the Brazilian Championship: 1970.
