= Giustozzi =

Giustozzi is a surname. Notable people with the surname include:

- Diego Giustozzi (born 1978), Argentine futsal manager
- Raúl Giustozzi (born 1952), Argentinian footballer
