= Taça de Prata =

Taça de Prata may refer to these Brazilian football trophies:

- Torneio Roberto Gomes Pedrosa (1967–1970)
- Campeonato Brasileiro Série B (since 1971)
