= 1979 in Brazilian football =

Football in Brazil
- Season: 1979

The year 1979 was the 78th season of competitive football (soccer) in Brazil.

== Campeonato Brasileiro Série A ==
Semifinals

Team 1	Agg.	Team 2	1st leg	2nd leg
Coritiba	2-3	Vasco da Gama	1-1	1-2
Palmeiras	3-4	Internacional	2-3	1-1

Final

December 20, 1979

Vasco da Gama	0–2	Internacional

Maracanã

December 23, 1979

Internacional	2–1	Vasco da Gama

Beira-Rio

Internacional declared as the Campeonato Brasileiro champions by aggregate score of 4-1.

== State championship champions ==
State	Champion	State	Champion
Acre	Rio Branco-AC	Paraíba	Campinense
Alagoas	CRB	Paraná	Coritiba
Amapá	Amapá	Pernambuco	Santa Cruz
Amazonas	Nacional	Piauí	Flamengo-PI
Bahia	Bahia	Rio de Janeiro	Flamengo; Flamengo^{(1)}
Ceará	Ferroviário-CE	Rio Grande do Norte	América-RN
Distrito Federal	Gama	Rio Grande do Sul	Grêmio
Espírito Santo	Desportiva	Rondônia	Ferroviário-RO
Goiás	Vila Nova	Roraima	Ríver-RR
Maranhão	Maranhão	Santa Catarina	Joinville
Mato Grosso	Mixto	São Paulo	Corinthians
Mato Grosso do Sul	Operário	Sergipe	Itabaiana
Minas Gerais	Atlético Mineiro	Tocantins	-
Pará	Remo		

^{(1)}In 1979, two editions of the Rio de Janeiro State Championship were played because Guanabara State's and Rio de Janeiro State's football federations merged in 1978. The Rio de Janeiro State Football Federation organized both competitions, which were won by Flamengo.

== Youth competition champions ==
Competition	Champion
Copa São Paulo de Juniores	Marília

== Other competition champions ==
Competition	Champion
Taça Minas Gerais	Atlético Mineiro
Torneio de Integração da Amazônia	Rio Branco

== Brazilian clubs in international competitions ==
Team	Copa Libertadores 1979
Guarani	Semifinals
Palmeiras	Group stage

== Brazil national team ==
The following table lists all the games played by the Brazil national football team in official competitions and friendly matches during 1979.

Date	Opposition	Result	Score	Brazil scorers	Competition
May 17, 1979	Paraguay	W	6-0	Éder, Zico (3), Nílton Batata (2)	International Friendly
May 31, 1979	Uruguay	W	5-1	Edinho, Sócrates (2), Nílton Batata, Éder	International Friendly
June 21, 1979	(Netherlands) Ajax	W	5-0	Sócrates (2), Toninho, Zico (2)	International Friendly (unofficial match)
July 5, 1979	Bahia State Combined Team	D	1-1	Juary	International Friendly (unofficial match)
July 26, 1979	Bolivia	L	1-2	Roberto Dinamite	Copa América
August 2, 1979	Argentina	W	2-1	Tita, Zico	Copa América
August 16, 1979	Bolivia	W	2-0	Tita, Zico	Copa América
August 23, 1979	Argentina	D	2-2	Sócrates (2)	Copa América
October 24, 1979	Paraguay	L	1-2	Palhinha	Copa América
October 31, 1979	Paraguay	D	2-2	Falcão, Sócrates	Copa América
