= Delmán Useche =

Venezuelan footballer (1948–1993)

Personal information
- Full name: Lorenzo Delmán Useche
- Date of birth: 21 June 1948
- Date of death: 1 December 1993 (aged 45)
- Position: Midfielder

Senior career*
Years	Team	Apps	(Gls)
1969-1973	Deportivo Italia		
1974-1975	Deportivo Galicia		
1976-?	Estudiantes de Merida		

International career
1969–1975	Venezuela	12	(0)
- * Club domestic league appearances and goals

Delmán Useche (21 June 1948 – 1 December 1993) was a Venezuelan footballer. He was part of Venezuela's squad for the 1975 Copa América tournament.

"Pito" Useche was one of the best players in the Little Maracanazo of Deportivo Italia in 1971.

DELMAN “PITO” USECHE (1948-1993) had a very brilliant career, both at a professional level and with the Venezuelan National Team. Considered by many to be the best “8” midfielder in Venezuela football history. A mix of strength to recover, with quality to go out playing. Leadership with a privileged physique. Long stride and power. He commanded respect without being violent. An emblem that transcended his generation. First Deportivo Italia, then Galicia and Estudiantes de Mérida had the privilege of enjoying the talent of this phenomenal mixed midfielder. He stepped on both areas with equal solvency. He would have been a candidate for export had the current market conditions existed. And once retired, almost forty years old, he put on the white shirt of his loves again to defend Don Bosco in the 1st category District League. He was the protagonist in the famous Maracanazo of Deportivo Italia against Fluminense. Libertadores Cups with Deportivo Italia in 1969, 1971 and 1972. With Deportivo Galicia in 1974 and 1975. His debut with the Vinotinto was with Juventud de América in 1967 in Paraguay. Then came the 1968 Pre-Olympic tournament in Colombia. In his senior years he played in the qualifiers for Mexico 70 and the 1975 Copa América. Jaime Gomez.

Useche died on 1 December 1993, at the age of 45.
