= Vito Fassano =

Venezuelan footballer (born 1940)

Personal information
- Date of birth: 11 February 1940 (age 86)
- Place of birth: Bari, Italy
- Position: Goalkeeper

Senior career*
Years	Team	Apps	(Gls)
1960–1967	Deportivo Italia		
1967–1968	Cruzeiro		
1969–1976	Deportivo Italia		

International career
1967–1969	Venezuela	5	(0)
- * Club domestic league appearances and goals

Vito Fassano (born 11 February 1940) is a Venezuelan former footballer. He played in five matches for the Venezuela national football team from 1967 to 1969. He was also part of Venezuela's squad for the 1967 South American Championship.

Born in Bari, Fassano played for Deportivo Italia for most of his career, except for a brief spell at Cruzeiro, and was present during their famous victory over Fluminense, the reigning champions of Brazil, in 1971.
