= 1979 Campeonato Carioca =

Campeonato Carioca
- Season: 1979
- Champions: Flamengo
- Matches played: 90
- Goals scored: 265 (2.94 per match)
- Top goalscorer: Zico (Flamengo) - 26 goals
- Biggest home win: Botafogo 7-0 Fluminense de Nova Friburgo (February 7, 1979)
- Biggest away win: Fluminense de Nova Friburgo; 0-5 Botafogo (April 22, 1979)
- Highest scoring: Flamengo 7-1 Goytacaz (March 29, 1979)

Campeonato Carioca
- Season: 1979
- Champions: Flamengo
- Copa Brasil 1979: Fluminense; Flamengo; Vasco da Gama; Botafogo; América; Goytacaz; Americano; Campo Grande
- Copa Brasil 1980: Fluminense; Flamengo; Vasco da Gama; Botafogo; América
- Taça de Prata: Goytacaz; Bangu; Americano; Campo Grande; Serrano; Bonsucesso
- Matches played: 252
- Goals scored: 596 (2.37 per match)
- Top goalscorer: Zico (Flamengo) - 34 goals
- Biggest home win: Vasco da Gama 7-0 Portuguesa (October 20, 1979)
- Biggest away win: São Cristóvão 1-8 Fluminense (May 6, 1979)
- Highest scoring: São Cristóvão 1-8 Fluminense (May 6, 1979)

The 1979 Campeonato Carioca had two editions.

== Special Championship ==
The first edition was the first championship organized by the recently founded FFERJ. It would include ten clubs; the six best teams of the 1978 City qualification and the four best teams of the 1978 State qualification. The championship would actually count for the 1978 season, and would be played in a double round-robin system. However, little less than two weeks before the beginning of the championship, the qualifications were acknowledged as the official Fluminense and Carioca championships of that year, and what would be the 1978 championship was turned into a "Special Championship" for 1979. Flamengo won its 19th title.

| Pos | Team | Pld | W | D | L | GF | GA | GD | Pts | Qualification or relegation |
|---|---|---|---|---|---|---|---|---|---|---|
| 1 | Flamengo | 18 | 13 | 5 | 0 | 51 | 12 | +39 | 31 | Champions |
| 2 | Fluminense | 18 | 11 | 5 | 2 | 45 | 18 | +27 | 27 | |
| 3 | Vasco da Gama | 18 | 11 | 5 | 2 | 34 | 11 | +23 | 27 | |
| 4 | Botafogo | 18 | 9 | 5 | 4 | 41 | 14 | +27 | 23 | |
| 5 | Americano | 18 | 8 | 4 | 6 | 24 | 28 | −4 | 20 | |
| 6 | América | 18 | 4 | 6 | 8 | 20 | 30 | −10 | 14 | |
| 7 | Volta Redonda | 18 | 5 | 2 | 11 | 18 | 26 | −8 | 12 | |
| 8 | Goytacaz | 18 | 3 | 3 | 12 | 14 | 38 | −24 | 9 | |
| 9 | São Cristóvão | 18 | 3 | 3 | 12 | 8 | 41 | −33 | 9 | |
| 10 | Fluminense de Nova Friburgo | 18 | 2 | 4 | 12 | 10 | 47 | −37 | 8 | |

Updated to match(es) played on April 29, 1979. Source: RSSSF.com
Rules for classification: 1) points; 2) wins; 3) goal difference; 4) number of goals scored.

== Championship ==
The championship began on May 5, 1979 and ended on November 4, 1979, and was disputed by the twelve teams of the 1978 Campeonato Carioca and the six teams of the 1978 Campeonato Fluminense. Flamengo won its 20th title.

=== System ===
The tournament would be divided in four stages:

- Taça Guanabara: The eighteen teams all played in a single round-robin format against each other. The champions earned a bonus point for the Third round; the ten best teams went to the Taça Inocêncio Pereira Leal and the eight worst went to the Taça Orlando Leal Carneiro.
- Taça Inocêncio Pereira Leal: The ten teams all played in a single round-robin format against each other. The champions earned a bonus point for the Third round. The six best teams qualified to the Third round.
- Taça Orlando Leal Carneiro: The eight teams all played in a single round-robin format against each other. The two best teams qualified to the Third round.
- Third round: The eight teams all played in a single round-robin format against each other. The team with the most points won the title.

=== Taça Guanabara ===
| Pos | Team | Pld | W | D | L | GF | GA | GD | Pts | Qualification or relegation |
|---|---|---|---|---|---|---|---|---|---|---|
| 1 | Flamengo | 17 | 16 | 0 | 1 | 52 | 13 | +39 | 32 | Qualified to Third round |
| 2 | Vasco da Gama | 17 | 12 | 1 | 4 | 44 | 12 | +32 | 25 | Taça Inocêncio Pereira Leal |
| 3 | Fluminense | 17 | 10 | 3 | 4 | 40 | 15 | +25 | 23 | Taça Inocêncio Pereira Leal |
| 4 | Botafogo | 17 | 9 | 5 | 3 | 39 | 16 | +23 | 23 | Taça Inocêncio Pereira Leal |
| 5 | Americano | 17 | 9 | 4 | 4 | 28 | 24 | +4 | 22 | Taça Inocêncio Pereira Leal |
| 6 | Goytacaz | 17 | 8 | 6 | 3 | 26 | 17 | +9 | 22 | Taça Inocêncio Pereira Leal |
| 7 | América | 17 | 7 | 5 | 5 | 17 | 17 | 0 | 19 | Taça Inocêncio Pereira Leal |
| 8 | Campo Grande | 17 | 7 | 5 | 5 | 14 | 16 | −2 | 19 | Taça Inocêncio Pereira Leal |
| 9 | Serrano | 17 | 6 | 6 | 5 | 11 | 14 | −3 | 18 | Taça Inocêncio Pereira Leal |
| 10 | Bonsucesso | 17 | 7 | 3 | 7 | 19 | 23 | −4 | 17 | Taça Inocêncio Pereira Leal |
| 11 | Madureira | 17 | 4 | 6 | 7 | 18 | 23 | −5 | 14 | Taça Orlando Leal Carneiro |
| 12 | Bangu | 17 | 4 | 6 | 7 | 11 | 25 | −14 | 14 | Taça Orlando Leal Carneiro |
| 13 | Volta Redonda | 17 | 4 | 4 | 9 | 13 | 26 | −13 | 12 | Taça Orlando Leal Carneiro |
| 14 | Fluminense de Nova Friburgo | 17 | 4 | 4 | 9 | 6 | 19 | −13 | 12 | Taça Orlando Leal Carneiro |
| 15 | São Cristóvão | 17 | 3 | 3 | 11 | 8 | 32 | −24 | 9 | Taça Orlando Leal Carneiro |
| 16 | Portuguesa | 17 | 1 | 7 | 9 | 3 | 16 | −13 | 9 | Taça Orlando Leal Carneiro |
| 17 | Niterói | 17 | 3 | 2 | 12 | 12 | 37 | −25 | 8 | Taça Orlando Leal Carneiro |
| 18 | Olaria | 17 | 2 | 4 | 11 | 12 | 28 | −16 | 8 | Taça Orlando Leal Carneiro |

Updated to match(es) played on July 22, 1979. Source: RSSSF.com
Rules for classification: 1) points; 2) wins; 3) goal difference; 4) number of goals scored.

=== Taça Inocêncio Pereira Leal ===
| Pos | Team | Pld | W | D | L | GF | GA | GD | Pts | Qualification or relegation |
|---|---|---|---|---|---|---|---|---|---|---|
| 1 | Flamengo | 9 | 6 | 1 | 2 | 17 | 8 | +9 | 13 | Champions |
| 2 | Botafogo | 9 | 4 | 4 | 1 | 12 | 8 | +4 | 12 | Qualified |
| 3 | Vasco da Gama | 9 | 4 | 3 | 2 | 16 | 9 | +7 | 11 | Qualified |
| 4 | Fluminense | 9 | 4 | 3 | 2 | 10 | 3 | +7 | 11 | Qualified |
| 5 | Americano | 9 | 3 | 3 | 3 | 7 | 8 | −1 | 9 | Qualified |
| 6 | Goytacaz | 9 | 2 | 5 | 2 | 4 | 6 | −2 | 9 | Qualified |
| 7 | América | 9 | 2 | 4 | 3 | 5 | 7 | −2 | 8 | |
| 8 | Serrano | 9 | 1 | 5 | 3 | 4 | 13 | −9 | 7 | |
| 9 | Bonsucesso | 9 | 1 | 3 | 5 | 5 | 9 | −4 | 5 | |
| 10 | Campo Grande | 9 | 1 | 3 | 5 | 3 | 12 | −9 | 5 | |

Updated to match(es) played on September 23, 1979. Source: RSSSF.com
Rules for classification: 1) points; 2) wins; 3) goal difference; 4) number of goals scored.

=== Taça Orlando Leal Carneiro ===
| Pos | Team | Pld | W | D | L | GF | GA | GD | Pts | Qualification or relegation |
|---|---|---|---|---|---|---|---|---|---|---|
| 1 | Bangu | 7 | 5 | 1 | 1 | 11 | 3 | +8 | 11 | Qualified |
| 2 | Portuguesa | 7 | 4 | 2 | 1 | 5 | 1 | +4 | 10 | Qualified |
| 3 | Fluminense de Nova Friburgo | 7 | 4 | 2 | 1 | 10 | 6 | +4 | 10 | |
| 4 | Olaria | 7 | 3 | 1 | 3 | 4 | 5 | −1 | 7 | |
| 5 | Volta Redonda | 7 | 2 | 2 | 3 | 5 | 9 | −4 | 6 | |
| 6 | São Cristóvão | 7 | 1 | 4 | 2 | 3 | 4 | −1 | 6 | |
| 7 | Madureira | 7 | 1 | 2 | 4 | 4 | 7 | −3 | 4 | |
| 8 | Niterói | 7 | 0 | 2 | 5 | 2 | 10 | −8 | 2 | |

Updated to match(es) played on September 23, 1979. Source: RSSSF.com
Rules for classification: 1) points; 2) wins; 3) goal difference; 4) goal average.

=== Third round ===
| Pos | Team | Pld | W | D | L | GF | GA | GD | Pts | Qualification or relegation |
|---|---|---|---|---|---|---|---|---|---|---|
| 1 | Flamengo | 7 | 5 | 1 | 1 | 15 | 6 | +9 | 13 | Champions |
| 2 | Vasco da Gama | 7 | 6 | 0 | 1 | 18 | 6 | +12 | 12 | |
| 3 | Botafogo | 7 | 5 | 1 | 1 | 16 | 6 | +10 | 11 | |
| 4 | Fluminense | 7 | 5 | 0 | 2 | 20 | 10 | +10 | 10 | |
| 5 | Americano | 7 | 2 | 0 | 5 | 9 | 15 | −6 | 4 | |
| 6 | Goytacaz | 7 | 1 | 1 | 5 | 7 | 18 | −11 | 3 | |
| 7 | Portuguesa | 7 | 1 | 1 | 5 | 4 | 17 | −13 | 3 | |
| 8 | Bangu | 7 | 1 | 0 | 6 | 5 | 16 | −11 | 2 | |

Updated to match(es) played on September 23, 1979. Source: RSSSF.com
Rules for classification: 1) points; 2) wins; 3) goal difference; 4) number of goals scored.
