= Freddy Elie =

Haitian-born Venezuelan footballer (1946–2023)

Personal information
- Full name: Fréderic José Elie Arlet
- Date of birth: 10 March 1946
- Place of birth: Port-au-Prince, Haiti
- Date of death: 2 November 2023 (aged 77)
- Height: 1.79 m (5 ft 10 in)
- Position: Defender

Senior career*
Years	Team	Apps	(Gls)
1964–1970	Deportivo Galicia	120	(8)
1970–1971	Deportivo Italia	64	(3)
1972	José Gálvez	28	(1)
1973–1974	Alianza Lima	27	(2)
1975	Tiquire Canarias	23	(0)
1976–1979	Portuguesa	104	(6)
1980	Lara	29	(0)
1981	Universidad de Los Andes	23	(1)

International career
1964–1977	Venezuela	20	(1)

Managerial career
- 2001: UA Maracaibo
- * Club domestic league appearances and goals

Fréderic José Elie Arlet (10 March 1946 – 2 November 2023) was a Haitian-born Venezuelan football player and manager. Born in Haiti, he made 20 appearances for the Venezuela national team between 1964 and 1977.

== Career ==
Freddy Elie stood out for his passing ability and speed. He grew up in La Guaira, Venezuela, debuting professionally with Deportivo Galicia, then moving to Deportivo Italia in 1970.

With Deportivo Italia he participated as a central defender in the Little Maracanazo, a match in 1971 in which Deportivo Italia scored a surprise 1–0 upset over Brazilian champion Fluminense FC, a club managed by Mário Zagallo, who was manager of the Brazil national team when they won the 1970 World Cup a few months earlier.

Elie made 20 appearances with the Venezuela national team between 1964 and 1977.

In 1973, Elie was signed by Alianza Lima.

From 1975 to 1980, Elie moved on to play with Tiquire Canarias, Portuguesa F.C., then Lara F.C., before finishing his career in 1981 in Venezuela with the Universidad de Los Andes club.

In 2001 he was the coach of the Unión Atlético Maracaibo.

== Death ==
Freddy Elie died on 2 November 2023, at the age of 77.

== Honours ==
Portuguesa

- Venezuelan Primera División: 1976, 1977, 1978
