= Raúl Giustozzi =

Argentinian footballer (born 1950)

Personal information
- Full name: Raúl Alberto Giustozzi
- Date of birth: 26 August 1950 (age 76)
- Place of birth: Rosario, Santa Fe. Argentina
- Position: Defender

Youth career
- ???–1969: River Plate

Senior career*
Years	Team	Apps	(Gls)
1970–1973	River Plate	77	(5)
1974	Banfield	31	(0)
1975	Gimnasia	41	(1)
1976–1981	Tigre	29	(0)
Total		178	(6)
- * Club domestic league appearances and goals

Raúl Alberto Giustozzi (born 28 April 1952) is a retired Argentinian footballer. Nicknamed "Rulo", he played as a defender for various clubs throughout the 1970s as he was known for spending a majority of his career with River Plate and Tigre.

== Career ==
Giustozzi began his career by playing for the senior squad of River Plate in 1970 after being promoted from the youth sector by club manager Didi as a part of a project to promote several youth players to the senior squad. He often had to compete with other players such as Jorge Dominichi, Abel Vieytez and Osvaldo Alejandro Pérez to play in official tournament matches. Despite his participation in the brawl that had occurred between River Plate and Fluminense on 3 February 1972 in which he would ne briefly suspended alongside his teammates Héctor Isaac Rodríguez, René Daulte, Jorge Gabriel Vázquez, César-Auguste Laraignée, Joaquín Pedro Martínez and Alfredo Granato, he would find regular success in both the 1972 and the 1973 seasons and scored 5 goals over the course of his career with the club. By 1974 however, he transferred over to Banfield for a single season as well as play for Gimnasia for the 1975 season. He would spend the rest his career with Tigre where the he would be a part of the winning squad of the 1980 Argentine Primera División B and would spend the next year returning to the top flight of Argentinian football before retiring at the end of the season with 178 total matches and six goals.
