= Pedrosa (footballer) =

Brazilian footballer

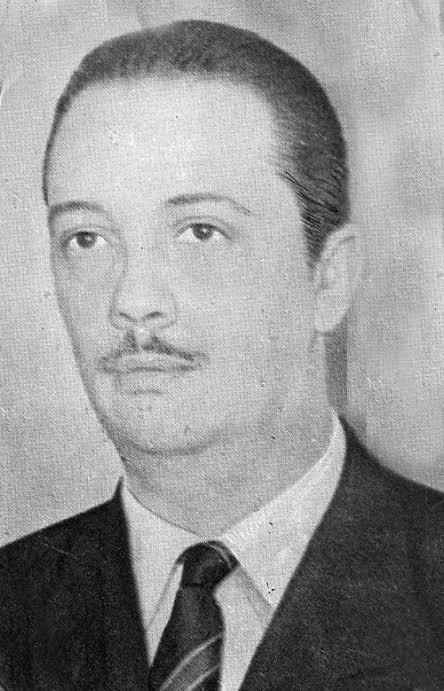

Personal information
- Full name: Roberto Gomes Pedrosa
- Date of birth: 8 July 1913
- Place of birth: Rio de Janeiro, Brazil
- Date of death: 6 January 1954 (aged 40)
- Position: Goalkeeper

Senior career*
Years	Team	Apps	(Gls)
1930–1934	Botafogo		
1935–1937	Estudante Paulista		
1938–1939	São Paulo		

International career
1934	Brazil	1	(0)
- * Club domestic league appearances and goals

Roberto Gomes Pedrosa (8 July 1913 – 6 January 1954), known as Pedrosa, was a former Brazilian football player. He has played for Brazil national team in the 1934 FIFA World Cup. After retirement, he became chairman of the Federação Paulista de Futebol, holding the office from 1947 until his death in 1954. The Torneio Roberto Gomes Pedrosa, a predecessor of the modern Campeonato Brasileiro, was named after him.
