= 1970 in Brazilian football =

Football in Brazil
- Season: 1970

The following article presents a summary of the 1970 football (soccer) season in Brazil, which was the 69th season of competitive football in the country.

== Torneio Roberto Gomes Pedrosa ==
Final Stage

Position	Team	Points	Played	Won	Drawn	Lost	For	Against	Difference
1	Fluminense	5	3	2	1	0	2	1	2
2	Palmeiras	4	3	2	0	1	7	3	4
3	Atlético Mineiro	2	3	0	2	1	2	5	-3
4	Cruzeiro	1	3	0	1	2	3	6	-3

Fluminense declared as the Torneio Roberto Gomes Pedrosa champions.

== State championship champions ==
State	Champion	State	Champion
Acre	Independência	Pará	Tuna Luso
Alagoas	CRB	Paraíba	Botafogo-PB
Amapá	São José-AP	Paraná	Atlético Paranaense
Amazonas	Fast	Pernambuco	Santa Cruz
Bahia	Bahia	Piauí	Flamengo-PI
Ceará	Ferroviário-CE	Rio de Janeiro	Central
Distrito Federal	Brasiliense (Núcleo Bandeirante)	Rio Grande do Norte	ABC
Espírito Santo	Rio Branco-ES	Rio Grande do Sul	Internacional
Goiás	Atlético Goianiense	Rondônia	Ferroviário-RO
Guanabara	Vasco	Roraima	-
Maranhão	Maranhão	Santa Catarina	Ferroviário-SC
Mato Grosso	Mixto	São Paulo	São Paulo
Mato Grosso do Sul	-	Sergipe	Sergipe
Minas Gerais	Atlético Mineiro	Tocantins	-

== Youth competition champions ==
Competition	Champion
Copa São Paulo de Juniores	Corinthians

== Other competition champions ==
Competition	Champion
Copa Norte-Nordeste	Fortaleza

== Brazilian clubs in international competitions ==
Team	Copa Libertadores 1970
Cruzeiro	Withdrew
Palmeiras	Withdrew

== Brazil national team ==
The following table lists all the games played by the Brazil national football team in official competitions and friendly matches during 1970.

Date	Opposition	Result	Score	Brazil scorers	Competition
March 4, 1970	Argentina	L	0-2	-	International Friendly
March 8, 1970	Argentina	W	2-1	Jairzinho, Pelé	International Friendly
March 22, 1970	Chile	W	5-0	Pelé (2), Roberto Miranda (2), Gérson	International Friendly
March 26, 1970	Chile	W	2-1	Carlos Alberto Torres, Rivellino	International Friendly
April 5, 1970	(Amazonas (Brazilian state)) Amazonas State Combined Team	W	4-1	Carlos Alberto Torres, Paulo César Caju, Rivellino, Pelé	International Friendly (unofficial match)
April 12, 1970	Paraguay	D	0-0	-	International Friendly
April 19, 1970	Minas Gerais State Combined Team	W	3-1	Dadá Maravilha (2), Gérson	International Friendly (unofficial match)
April 26, 1970	Bulgaria	W	0-0	-	International Friendly
April 29, 1970	Austria	W	1-0	Rivellino	International Friendly
May 6, 1970	Guadalajara City Combined Team	W	3-0	Rivellino, Pelé, Clodoaldo	International Friendly (unofficial match)
May 17, 1970	León City Combined Team	W	5-2	Pelé (2), Rivellino, Tostão, Paulo César Caju	International Friendly (unofficial match)
May 24, 1970	(Mexico) Irapuato	W	3-0	Paulo César Caju, Roberto Miranda, Rivellino	International Friendly (unofficial match)
June 3, 1970	Czechoslovakia	W	4-1	Rivellino, Pelé, Jairzinho (2)	World Cup
June 7, 1970	England	W	1-0	Jairzinho (2)	World Cup
June 10, 1970	Romania	W	3-2	Pelé (2), Jairzinho	World Cup
June 14, 1970	Peru	W	4-2	Rivellino, Tostão (2), Jairzinho	World Cup
June 17, 1970	Uruguay	W	3-1	Clodoaldo, Jairzinho, Rivellino	World Cup
June 21, 1970	Italy	W	4-1	Pelé, Gérson, Jairzinho, Carlos Alberto Torres	World Cup
September 30, 1970	Mexico	W	2-1	Jairzinho, Tostão	International Friendly
October 4, 1970	Chile	W	5-1	Pelé, Roberto Miranda, Jairzinho (2), Paulo César Caju	International Friendly
