= Nílton Batata =

Brazilian footballer

Personal information
- Full name: Nílton Pinheiro da Silva
- Date of birth: 5 November 1954 (age 71)
- Place of birth: Londrina, Brazil
- Height: 1.67 m (5 ft 6 in)
- Positions: Forward; midfielder

Senior career*
Years	Team	Apps	(Gls)
1972–1976	Athletico Paranaense		
1976–1980	Santos		
1980–1983	Club América		
1984	Athletico Paranaense		
1984–1986	Los Angeles Lazers (indoors)		
1986–1989	Chicago Sting		
1990–1992	Chicago Power (indoors)		

International career
1979	Brazil	4	(3)
- * Club domestic league appearances and goals

Nílton Pinheiro da Silva (born 5 November 1954), known as Nílton Batata, (Note: He was called Batata or "little potato" during school years.) is a Brazilian footballer.

== Club career ==
Nílton Batata played for Athletico Paranaense and Santos in Brazil, then he joined Club América in Mexico. Later on, he moved to the USA to play indoor soccer for Los Angeles Lazers. Then he played for Chicago Sting, before returning to indoor soccer by joining Chicago Power.

== International career ==
He played in four matches for the Brazil in 1979. He was also part of Brazil's squad for the 1979 Copa América tournament.

== Later career ==
Nílton has owned a football academy since 1983. He also coached Sockers FC Chicago U13–U14.

In 2012, Nílton joined the Spanish-language sports television network ESPN Deportes, where he served as a commentator alongside reporter Richard Méndez for matches in Brazil.
