= Sérgio Cosme =

Brazilian footballer

Personal information
- Full name: Sérgio Cosme Cupelo Braga
- Date of birth: 28 September 1950 (age 76)
- Place of birth: Rio de Janeiro, Brazil
- Position: Defender

Senior career*
Years	Team	Apps	(Gls)
1969–1971	Fluminense	19	(0)
1972–1973	Campo Grande-RJ		
1974	Bangu		
1974–1975	America-RJ		
1976–1978	Bangu		
1979–1981	Portuguesa-RJ		
1982	Operário-MS		

Managerial career
- 1984–1987: Portuguesa-RJ
- 1988–1989: Fluminense
- 1989: Vasco da Gama
- 1989–1990: Al-Gharafa
- 1990: Qatar SC
- 1991: Santa Cruz
- 1991: Bangu
- 1992: Fluminense
- 1993: Grêmio
- 1995: Atlético Paranaense
- 1996: Bangu
- 1996: Criciúma
- 1997: Araçatuba
- 1997: Criciúma
- 1998: Fluminense
- 1999: XV de Piracicaba
- 2001: America-RJ
- 2002–2003: Olaria
- 2004: Anápolis
- 2005–2006: Vasco da Gama (U20)
- 2007: Vila Nova
- 2008: Bangu
- 2008: Santa Helena
- 2009: Mineiros
- 2010: Vila Nova (coordinator)
- 2011: Paysandu
- 2012–2013: Treze
- 2014: Portuguesa-RJ
- 2017: Ypiranga-AP
- 2018: Bangu (coordinator)
- * Club domestic league appearances and goals

Sérgio Cosme Cupelo Braga (born 28 September 1950), simply known as Sérgio Cosme, is a Brazilian former professional footballer and manager, who played as a defender.

== Playing career ==
As a player Sérgio Cosme had his best moment playing for Fluminense, where he was part of the Guanabara Cup champion squad in 1971. He also played for Campo Grande, Bangu, America-RJ, Portuguesa-RJ and Operário-MS.

== Managerial career ==
Cosme began his coaching career at Portuguesa da Ilha do Governador. He was also coach of Fluminense, Vasco, teams from Qatar, Grêmio, Athletico Paranaense, Treze among others. He won the Paramaribo International Tournament with Paysandu in 2011. His last jobs were at Ypiranga-AP in 2017 and at Bangu AC, as technical coordinator.

== Honours ==
=== Player ===
Fluminense

- Taça Guanabara: 1971

=== Manager ===
Paysandu

- Torneio Internacional de Paramaribo: 2011
