= 1973 Campeonato Carioca =

Campeonato Carioca
- Season: 1973
- Champions: Fluminense
- 1973 Campeonato Nacional: Vasco da Gama; Flamengo; Fluminense; América; Botafogo; Olaria
- 1974 Campeonato Nacional: Vasco da Gama; Flamengo; Fluminense; América; Botafogo; Olaria
- Matches played: 113
- Goals scored: 258 (2.28 per match)
- Top goalscorer: Dario (Flamengo) - 15 goals
- Biggest home win: Botafogo 5-1 América (July 28, 1973)
- Biggest away win: Bangu 0-8 Flamengo (July 19, 1973)
- Highest scoring: Bangu 0-8 Flamengo (July 19, 1973)

The 1973 edition of the Campeonato Carioca kicked off on March 10, 1973 and ended on August 22, 1973. It was organized by FCF (Federação Carioca de Futebol, or Carioca Football Federation). Twelve teams participated. Fluminense won the title for the 21st time. no teams were relegated.

== System ==
The tournament would be divided in four stages:

- Taça Guanabara: The twelve teams all played in a single round-robin format against each other. The champions qualified to the Final phase. The eight best teams qualified to the Second round.
- Taça Francisco Laport: The remaining eight teams all played in a single round-robin format against each other. The champions qualified to the Final phase.
- Third round: The eight teams were divided into two groups of four, and each team played in a single round-robin format against the team of the other group. The champions of each group qualified to the Final phase.
- Final phase: The four qualified teams played in a one-legged knockout tournament against each other - In case that the same team won two of the four positions, it'd qualify directly to the Finals. In case of a tie, the first and second round champions took precedence over the third stage winners.

== Championship ==
=== Taça Guanabara ===
Pos	Team	Pld	W	D	L	GF	GA	GD	Pts	Qualification or relegation
1	Flamengo	11	9	2	0	17	4	+13	20	Qualified to Final phase
2	Vasco da Gama	11	8	2	1	19	5	+14	18	Qualified
3	Botafogo	11	7	3	1	24	14	+10	17	Qualified
4	América	11	7	2	2	24	15	+9	16	Qualified
5	Olaria	11	5	2	4	13	12	+1	12	Qualified
6	Fluminense	11	4	3	4	13	8	+5	11	Qualified
7	Bonsucesso	11	3	5	3	8	6	+2	11	Qualified
8	Bangu	11	4	2	5	16	13	+3	10	Qualified
9	Madureira	11	2	2	7	10	18	−8	6	
10	Portuguesa	11	2	2	7	8	17	−9	6	
11	Campo Grande	11	1	2	8	6	25	−19	4	
12	São Cristóvão	11	0	1	10	7	28	−21	1	

Updated to match(es) played on May 23, 1973. Source: RSSSF.com
Rules for classification: 1) points; 2) goal difference; 3) wins; 4) number of goals scored.

=== Taça Francisco Laport ===
Pos	Team	Pld	W	D	L	GF	GA	GD	Pts	Qualification or relegation
1	Fluminense	7	4	3	0	14	4	+10	11	Playoffs
2	Vasco da Gama	7	4	3	0	10	4	+6	11	Playoffs
3	Flamengo	7	4	1	2	13	5	+8	9	
4	América	7	2	4	1	8	6	+2	8	
5	Botafogo	7	2	3	2	8	7	+1	7	
6	Bonsucesso	7	1	3	3	4	7	−3	5	
7	Olaria	7	1	1	5	4	9	−5	3	
8	Bangu	7	0	2	5	0	19	−19	2	

Updated to match(es) played on July 23, 1973. Source: RSSSF.com
Rules for classification: 1) points; 2) goal difference; 3) wins; 4) number of goals scored.

==== Playoffs ====
Team 1	Score	Team 2
Fluminense	1–0	Vasco da Gama

=== Third round ===
==== Group A ====
Pos	Team	Pld	W	D	L	GF	GA	GD	Pts	Qualification or relegation
1	Vasco da Gama	4	4	0	0	6	0	+6	8	Qualified to Final phase
2	Flamengo	4	1	1	2	2	3	−1	3	
3	América	3	1	1	1	3	6	−3	3 (Note: The August 15 match against Olaria wasn't held)	
4	Bangu	4	0	2	2	1	3	−2	2	

Updated to match(es) played on August 15, 1973. Source: RSSSF.com
Rules for classification: 1) points; 2) goal difference; 3) wins; 4) number of goals scored.

==== Group B ====
Pos	Team	Pld	W	D	L	GF	GA	GD	Pts	Qualification or relegation
1	Botafogo	4	2	1	1	7	3	+4	5	Playoffs
2	Fluminense	4	2	1	1	3	2	+1	5	Playoffs
3	Olaria	3	1	0	2	1	3	−2	2 (Note: The August 15 match against América wasn't held)	
4	Bonsucesso	4	0	2	2	1	4	−3	2	

Updated to match(es) played on August 15, 1973. Source: RSSSF.com
Rules for classification: 1) points; 2) goal difference; 3) wins; 4) number of goals scored.

==== Playoffs ====
Team 1	Score	Team 2
Fluminense	0–0	Vasco da Gama

=== Final phase ===
==== Semifinals ====
Team 1	Score	Team 2
Fluminense	bye	
Flamengo	0–0	Vasco da Gama

==== Finals ====
22 August 1973
Final

Fluminense	4 – 2	Flamengo
Manfrini 40' 80'; Toninho 45'; Dionísio 84'		Dario 70' 78'

Maracanã, Rio de Janeiro
Attendance: 74,073
Referee: José Favilli Neto

== Top Scores ==
Rank	Player	Club	Goals
1	Darío	Flamengo	25
2	Manfrini	Fluminense	13
2	Sérgio Lima	América	13
4	Jorge Mendonça	Bangu	12
5	Dionísio	Fluminense	10
5	Ferretti	Botafogo	10
7	Doval	Flamengo	9
