= Torneio Roberto Gomes Pedrosa =

Torneio Roberto Gomes Pedrosa Taça de Prata
- Founded: 1967
- Abolished: 1970
- Region: Brazil
- Teams: 17 (in 1970)
- Most championships: Palmeiras (2 titles)

The Torneio Roberto Gomes Pedrosa, also known as Taça de Prata, or nicknamed Robertão, was an association football competition contested in Brazil between 1967 and 1970 among football teams from São Paulo, Rio de Janeiro, Rio Grande do Sul, Minas Gerais and Paraná states. It was an important football tournament, being considered a predecessor to the Brazilian Championship introduced in 1971. Thus in 2010 the Brazilian Football Confederation decided to consider the winners of the Robertão as Brazilian champions. The 1st edition of the tournament was organized by Federação Carioca de Futebol and Federação Paulista de Futebol.

== History ==
Torneio Roberto Gomes Pedrosa, nicknamed Robertão, was created in 1967 from the Torneio Rio-São Paulo, a traditional football competition contested by the major clubs from São Paulo and Rio de Janeiro, considered the strongest state federations. Since 1967, Torneio Rio-São Paulo had not been held until the revival in 1993, paving the way for the organization of Torneio Roberto Gomes Pedrosa at that time. The 1967 edition of Torneio Roberto Gomes Pedrosa was the first tournament that congregated all the main clubs of Brazil, named after the former president of São Paulo's football federation, Roberto Gomes Pedrosa (1913-1954). Since 1968, the tournament was also called the Taça de Prata (Silver Trophy) and considered the most important competition of Brazilian football.

Between 1959 and 1964 the winner of the Taça Brasil, a knockout competition which was contended in Brazil between 1959 and 1968, provided the Brazilian entrant for the following season's Copa Libertadores. The Copa Libertadores was expanded for 1966 and two Brazilian teams were allowed to enter; both the winners and runners-up of the 1965 and 1966 Taça Brasil entered the Copa Libertadores. Following the formation of the Torneio Roberto Gomes Pedrosa in 1967, one Brazilian Copa Libertadores place went to the winner of the Taça Brasil, and one to the winner of the Torneio Roberto Gomes Pedrosa in 1967 and 1968 Brazilian seasons. 1968 was the last year the Taça Brasil was contested; in 1969 and 1970 the top two finishers in the Torneio Roberto Gomes Pedrosa entered the following season's Copa Libertadores.

However, due to the misunderstandings between the Brazilian Football Confederation (CBD) and CONMEBOL, Brazil turned out not participating of the Copa Libertadores in 1969 and 1970, but the CBD came back to indicate Fluminense and Palmeiras, the champions and runners-up of Robertão 1970, as the representatives and they participated normally in Copa Libertadores 1971.

Owing to the organization of Campeonato Brasileiro in 1971, the Torneio Roberto Gomes Pedrosa was held last time in 1970.

== Teams ==
The 1967 edition of Torneio Roberto Gomes Pedrosa was the first tournament that congregated all the main clubs of Brazil, namely, Palmeiras, Corinthians, Santos, São Paulo and Portuguesa from São Paulo, Flamengo, Fluminense, Vasco da Gama, Botafogo and Bangu from Rio de Janeiro, Internacional and Grêmio from Rio Grande do Sul, Cruzeiro and Atlético from Minas Gerais, and Ferroviário from Paraná.

In 1968, E.C. Bahia from Bahia and Náutico from Pernambuco were included, and the representative of Paraná was Atlético Paranaense.

In 1969, América substituted for Bangu as the fifth Rio de Janeiro representative, whereas the states of the Paraná and Pernambuco had been represented by its champions of the previous year, Coritiba and Santa Cruz.

In 1970, Atlético Paranaense came back to represent its state, while Ponte Preta replaced Portuguesa as the fifth São Paulo representative.

== Format ==
The Torneio Roberto Gomes Pedrosa was famous for not having a final. In 1967, the teams were divided into two groups and all the teams played against each other once. The winners and runners-up of each group qualified for the final phase, when the four qualified teams played a double round-robin. The points they got in the final phase would add back to the points they gained in the first phase, and the teams with highest points were crowned the champions.

From 1968 on, the format had been undergone a small modification. A single round-robin was played instead of a double, and the points gained in the final phase were not added back to the points in the group stage. The teams getting the highest points in the final phase would be the champions.

== Result ==
Palmeiras, which had already lost in the Taça Brasil that year, were the champions of the first session of the tournament. They beat Grêmio in the final round of the final phase 2-1, while Corinthians lost 3-0 to Internacional, Palmeiras beating Corinthians by one point. César (Palmeiras) and Ademar (Flamengo) were the topscorers with 15 goals each.

In 1968, Santos conquered the Robertão, being the champions after beating Vasco 2-1 in the Maracanã in the final round. Again, Internacional were the runners-up, after defeating Palmeiras 3-0. Toninho (Santos) was the topscorer with 18 goals.

In 1969, the Taça Brasil was defunct and Robertão became the sole national competition. Palmeiras clinched the title again, beating Botafogo 3-1 in the last game. Cruzeiro won 2-1 over Corinthians in the final round and passed them to be the runners-up. The topscorer was Edu (América) with 14 goals.

The last session of the Robertão, before its transformation to Campeonato Brasileiro, was held in 1970, with Fluminense winning their first national championship. Palmeiras joined Fluminense to participate in the Copa Libertadores 1971 by beating Cruzeiro 4-2 in the last match and became the runners-up of the tournament. Tostão (Cruzeiro), scoring 12 goals, was the topscorer.

== Champions ==
In the period in which the competition was disputed by clubs from several states:

Year	Final		Third and Fourth places
Year	Winner	Runner-up	Third and Fourth places
1967; Details	Palmeiras (SP)	Internacional (RS)	Corinthians (SP)	Grêmio (RS)
1968; Details	Santos (SP)	Internacional (RS)	Vasco da Gama (RJ)	Palmeiras (SP)
1969; Details	Palmeiras (SP)	Cruzeiro (MG)	Corinthians (SP)	Botafogo (RJ)
1970; Details	Fluminense (RJ)	Palmeiras (SP)	Atlético Mineiro (MG)	Cruzeiro (MG)

== Titles by team ==
Team	Winner	Runner-up	Years won	Years runner-up
(São Paulo (state)) Palmeiras	2	1	1967, 1969	1970
(Rio de Janeiro (state)) Fluminense	1	0	1970
(São Paulo (state)) Santos	1	0	1968
(Rio Grande do Sul) Internacional	0	2		1967, 1968
(Minas Gerais) Cruzeiro	0	1		1969

== See also ==
- Torneio Rio-São Paulo
