= Cafuringa =

Brazilian footballer (1948–1991)

Personal information
- Full name: Moacir Fernandes
- Date of birth: November 10, 1948
- Place of birth: Juiz de Fora, Brazil
- Date of death: July 25, 1991 (aged 42)
- Place of death: Rio de Janeiro, Brazil
- Position: Right winger

Senior career*
Years	Team	Apps	(Gls)
1965	Botafogo		
- Bangu
1969–1975	Fluminense	63	(?)
1976	Atlético Mineiro	19	(?)
- Grêmio Maringá
1977–1978	Fluminense	14	(?)
1979	Caldense	6	(?)
- Deportivo Táchira
- * Club domestic league appearances and goals

Moacir Fernandes, commonly known by the nickname Cafuringa (November 10, 1948 – July 25, 1991), was a Brazilian professional football right winger best known for being the namesake of fellow footballer Cafu, who became one of the greatest full-backs of all time.

== Career ==
Born in Juiz de Fora, Minas Gerais state on November 10, 1948, Cafuringa started his professional career in 1965, playing for Botafogo. He then was transferred to Bangu, winning the Campeonato Carioca in 1969, 1971, 1973 and in 1975 as a Fluminense player. During that spell in Fluminense, he played 63 Campeonato Brasileiro Série A games. In 1976, he was transferred to Atlético Mineiro, where he played 19 Série A games. After defending Grêmio Maringá, Cafuringa returned to Fluminense, where he played 14 Série A games between 1977 and 1978. In 1979, he played six Série A games for Caldense, then he joined Venezuelan club Deportivo Táchira, where he retired.

After his retirement, Cafuringa played in the 1990 edition of the Pelé World Cup, a defunct competition for retired footballers aged over 35, scoring a goal in the final.

== Death ==
Cafuringa died on July 25, 1991, in Jacarepaguá neighborhood, Rio de Janeiro, of sepsis, resulting from an injury in a Masters match.
