= César Laraignée =

Argentine footballer

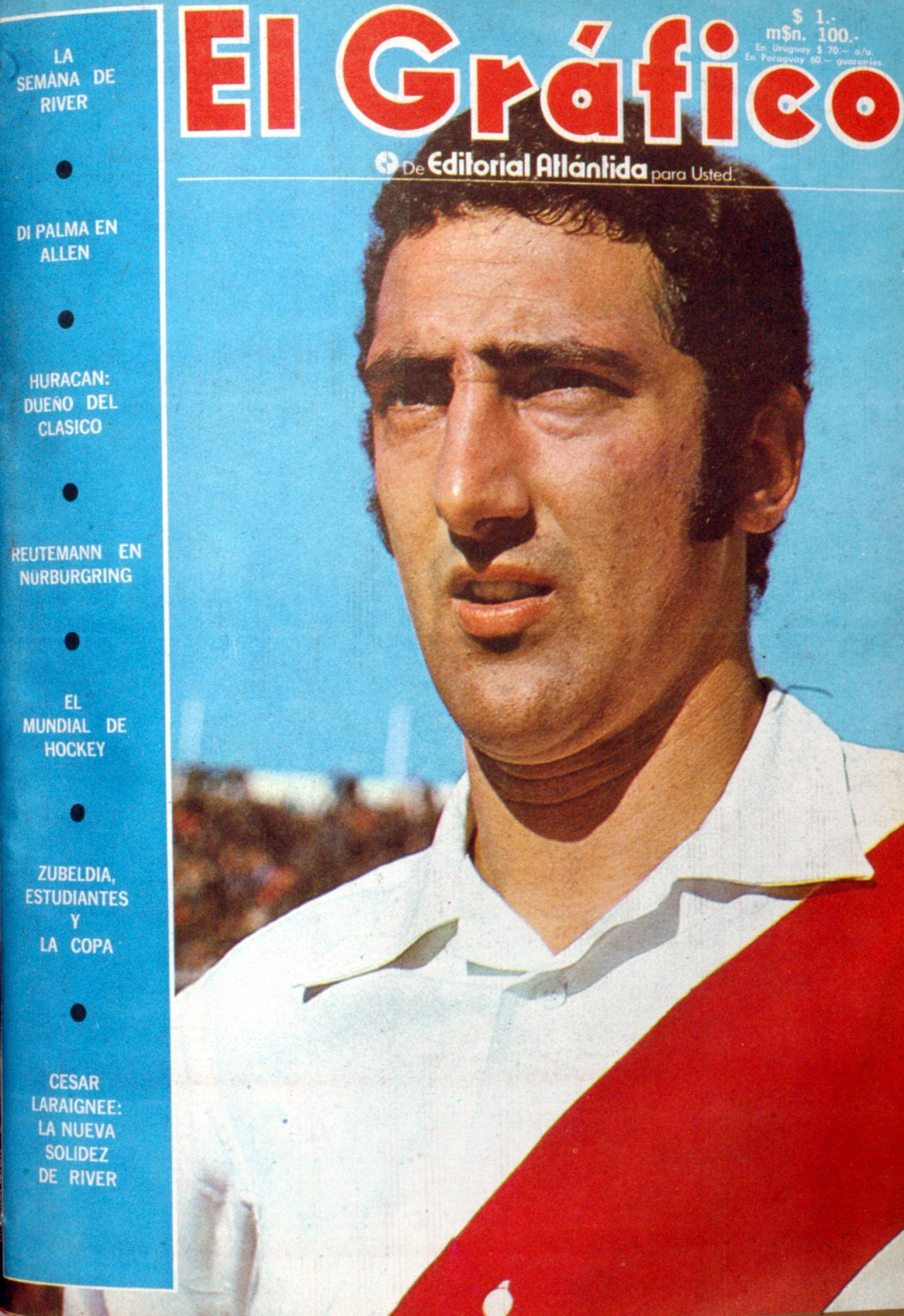
- Laraignée on the cover of El Gráfico in 1970

Personal information
- Full name: César-Auguste Laraignée
- Date of birth: February 10, 1949 (age 77)
- Place of birth: Buenos Aires, Argentina
- Height: 1.82 m (6 ft 0 in)
- Position: Defender

Youth career
- River Plate

Senior career*
Years	Team	Apps	(Gls)
1970–1972	River Plate	109	(14)
1972–1977	Stade de Reims	165	(16)
1977–1978	Stade Lavallois	15	(0)
1978–1979	Avignon	23	(0)
1979–1981	Rouen	42	(5)
Total		354	(35)

International career
1971	Argentina	4	(2)

Managerial career
- 1986–1987: Deportivo Laferrere
- 1990–1991: Deportivo Laferrere
- 1991–1992: Deportivo Laferrere
- 1995: Deportivo Laferrere
- 1996–1998: Deportivo Laferrere
- 1999: Deportes Temuco
- 1999: Unión San Felipe
- 2012–2015: River Plate (reserves)
- * Club domestic league appearances and goals

César-Auguste Laraignée (born February 10, 1949, in Buenos Aires) is a former Argentine football defender who spent most of his career in France.

He played internationally for Argentina.
