= Jorge Vázquez (footballer) =

Argentine footballer & manager (born 1969)

Personal information
- Full name: Jorge Gabriel Vázquez
- Date of birth: 28 November 1969 (age 56)
- Place of birth: Buenos Aires, Argentina
- Height: 1.75 m (5 ft 9 in)
- Position: Midfielder

Senior career*
Years	Team	Apps	(Gls)
1989–1993	River Plate	58	(6)
1991–1992	→ Vélez Sársfield (loan)	14	(1)
1993–1994	Universidad Católica	52	(8)
1995	Emelec	10	(2)
1996	Morelia	4	(0)
1996	Universidad Católica	8	(0)
1997–1998	Gimnasia y Tiro	18	(1)
2000–2001	All Boys	9	(2)
2001	Oriente Petrolero	3	(0)
2001–2002	San Martín Tucumán	–	(–)
2002–2003	Atlanta	11	(0)
2003	New England Revolution	5	(0)
2003	Kansas City Wizards	4	(0)
Total		196	(20)
- * Club domestic league appearances and goals

Jorge Gabriel Vázquez (born 28 November 1969) is an Argentine former footballer and manager who played for clubs in Argentina, Chile, Mexico, Bolivia, Ecuador and United States. He played as a midfielder.

== Career ==
Born in Buenos Aires, Argentina, Vázquez began playing football for local side River Plate. He also played for rivals Club Atlético Vélez Sársfield.

Vázquez had a brief spell with Mexican Primera División side Monarcas Morelia in 1996.

He finished his playing career in the United States, making four MLS appearances for the New England Revolution before being traded to the Kansas City Wizards in August 2003.

After he retired from playing, Vázquez became a football coach. His first job as manager was with Torneo Argentino A side Sportivo Desamparados in 2009.

== Teams ==
- (Argentina) River Plate 1989–1991
- (Argentina) Vélez Sársfield 1991–1992
- (Argentina) River Plate 1992–1993
- (Chile) Universidad Católica 1993-1994
- (Ecuador) Emelec 1995
- (Mexico) Morelia 1996
- (Chile) Universidad Católica 1996
- (Argentina) Gimnasia y Tiro de Salta 1997–1999
- (Argentina) All Boys 2000–2001
- (Bolivia) Oriente Petrolero 2001
- (Argentina) San Martín de Tucumán 2002
- (Argentina) Atlanta 2002
- (United States) New England Revolution 2003
- (United States) Kansas City Wizards 2003

== Titles ==
- River Plate 1989/90 (Primera División Argentina Championship)
- (Chile) Universidad Católica 1994 (Interamericana Cup)
