= 1969 Campeonato Carioca =

Campeonato Carioca
- Season: 1969
- Champions: Fluminense
- Torneio Roberto Gomes Pedrosa: Vasco da Gama; Flamengo; Fluminense; América; Botafogo
- Matches played: 94
- Goals scored: 237 (2.52 per match)
- Top goalscorer: Flávio (Fluminense) - 15 goals
- Biggest home win: Vasco da Gama 6-0 Madureira (April 26, 1969)
- Biggest away win: Bangu 0-6 Botafogo (May 24, 1969)
- Highest scoring: Madureira 1-6 Fluminense (March 15, 1969); Bangu 3-4 Portuguesa (June 7, 1969)

The 1969 edition of the Campeonato Carioca kicked off on March 8, 1969 and ended on June 22, 1969. It was organized by FCF (Federação Carioca de Futebol, or Carioca Football Federation). Twelve teams participated. Fluminense won the title for the 19th time. no teams were relegated.

== System ==
The tournament would be divided in two stages:

- First round: The twelve teams all played in a single round-robin format against each other. The eight best teams qualified to the Second round.
- Final phase: The remaining eight teams all played in a single round-robin format against each other. The team with the most points won the title.

== Championship ==
=== First round ===
Pos	Team	Pld	W	D	L	GF	GA	GD	Pts	Qualification or relegation
1	Botafogo	11	7	3	1	25	7	+18	17	Qualified
2	Fluminense	11	7	3	1	22	9	+13	17	Qualified
3	América	11	6	4	1	18	8	+10	16	Qualified
4	Flamengo	11	6	3	2	14	5	+9	15	Qualified
5	Vasco da Gama	11	5	3	3	21	11	+10	13	Qualified
6	Bangu	11	5	3	3	15	13	+2	13	Qualified
7	Bonsucesso	11	3	6	2	9	7	+2	12	Qualified
8	Portuguesa	11	4	0	7	11	17	−6	8	Qualified
9	Campo Grande	11	2	4	5	9	19	−10	8	
10	Olaria	11	3	0	8	6	17	−11	6	
11	São Cristóvão	11	2	0	9	7	23	−16	4	
12	Madureira	11	1	1	9	6	27	−21	3	

Updated to match(es) played on May 11, 1969. Source: RSSSF.com
Rules for classification: 1) points; 2) goal difference; 3) wins; 4) number of goals scored.

=== Final round ===
Pos	Team	Pld	W	D	L	GF	GA	GD	Pts	Qualification or relegation
1	Fluminense	7	5	1	1	13	6	+7	11 (Note: Fluminense finished ahead of Flamengo in head to-head points - Fluminense 2-0 Flamengo)	Champions
2	Flamengo	7	5	1	1	13	6	+7	11	
3	Vasco da Gama	7	3	3	1	8	4	+4	9	
4	Botafogo	7	3	2	2	15	6	+9	8	
5	Bonsucesso	7	2	2	3	6	8	−2	6	
6	América	7	1	2	4	5	11	−6	4	
7	Portuguesa	7	1	2	4	8	15	−7	4	
8	Bangu	7	1	1	5	6	18	−12	3	

Updated to match(es) played on June 22, 1969. Source: RSSSF.com
Rules for classification: 1) points; 2) goal difference; 3) goal average; 4) wins.

== Taça Guanabara ==
=== First round ===
Pos	Team	Pld	W	D	L	GF	GA	GD	Pts	Qualification or relegation
1	Fluminense	7	5	1	1	10	3	+7	11	Qualified
2	América	7	4	1	2	7	7	0	9	Qualified
3	Botafogo	7	3	2	2	8	7	+1	8	Qualified
4	Flamengo	7	3	2	2	11	10	+1	8	Qualified
5	Bonsucesso	7	2	3	2	3	3	0	7	
6	Vasco da Gama	7	2	2	3	5	4	+1	6	
7	Bangu	7	1	2	4	6	10	−4	4	
8	Campo Grande	7	1	1	5	4	10	−6	3	

Updated to match(es) played on August 5, 1969. Source: RSSSF.com
Rules for classification: 1) points; 2) goal difference; 3) wins; 4) number of goals scored.

=== Second round ===
Pos	Team	Pld	W	D	L	GF	GA	GD	Pts
1	Botafogo	3	1	2	0	4	3	+1	4
2	Fluminense	3	1	1	1	1	1	0	3
3	Flamengo	3	0	3	0	2	2	0	3
4	América	3	0	2	1	3	4	−1	2

Updated to match(es) played on August 17, 1969. Source: RSSSF.com
Rules for classification: 1) points; 2) goal difference; 3) wins; 4) number of goals scored.

=== Final standings ===
Pos	Team	Pld	W	D	L	GF	GA	GD	Pts	Qualification or relegation
1	Fluminense	10	6	2	2	11	4	+7	14	Champions
2	Botafogo	10	4	4	2	12	10	+2	12	
3	Flamengo	10	3	5	2	13	12	+1	11	
4	América	10	4	3	3	10	11	−1	11	

Updated to match(es) played on August 17, 1969. Source: RSSSF.com
Rules for classification: 1) points; 2) goal difference; 3) wins; 4) number of goals scored.
