= 1971 Campeonato Carioca =

Campeonato Carioca
- Season: 1971
- Champions: Fluminense
- Campeonato Nacional: Vasco da Gama; Flamengo; Fluminense; América; Botafogo
- Matches: 91
- Goals: 194 (2.13 per match)
- Top goalscorer: Paulo César Caju (Botafogo) - 11 goals
- Biggest home win: Vasco da Gama 3-0 São Cristóvão (March 16, 1971); Olaria 4-1 Campo Grande (April 4, 1971); Olaria 3-0 Bonsucesso (May 14, 1971); Olaria 3-0 América (May 22, 1971); América 3-0 Vasco da Gama (May 29, 1971)
- Biggest away win: São Cristóvão 0-5 Flamengo (March 31, 1971)
- Highest scoring: Bangu 3-5 América (March 30, 1971)

The 1971 edition of the Campeonato Carioca kicked off on March 6, 1971 and ended on June 27, 1971. It was organized by FCF (Federação Carioca de Futebol, or Carioca Football Federation). Twelve teams participated. Fluminense won the title for the 20th time. No teams were relegated.

== System ==
The tournament would be divided in two stages:

- First round: The twelve teams were divided into two groups, each team playing in a single round-robin format against the teams of the other group. The four best teams in each group qualified to the Second round.
- Final phase: The remaining eight teams all played in a double round-robin format against each other. The team with the most points won the title.

The regulations also had stipulated that the qualification for the National Championship later that year would be partially defined by revenue, with the four teams with the best revenue qualifying along with the champion. The qualification for the Taça Guanabara would also follow similar criteria. However, that criterion proved controversial, as Olaria began complaining about the federation supposedly favouring its competitors, América and Bangu, and eventually that criterion was scrapped altogether, after the retail chain Ponto Frio bought all the tickets for Olaria's last home match against Flamengo, in Maracanã, guaranteeing Olaria fifth place in the revenue ranking and prompting protests from América and Bangu. In the end, América was invited to the National Championship in the place of Olaria, who withdrew from the Taça Guanabara as well.

== Championship ==
=== First round ===
==== Group A ====
Pos	Team	Pld	W	D	L	GF	GA	GD	Pts	Qualification or relegation
1	América	6	3	2	1	11	6	+5	8	Qualified
2	Flamengo	6	2	3	1	10	4	+6	7	Qualified
3	Vasco da Gama	6	2	2	2	8	8	0	6	Qualified
4	Bonsucesso	6	2	1	3	3	5	−2	5	Qualified
5	Portuguesa	6	2	1	3	4	9	−5	5	
6	Campo Grande	6	0	3	3	7	12	−5	3	

Updated to match(es) played on April 4, 1971. Source: RSSSF.com
Rules for classification: 1) points; 2) goal difference; 3) wins; 4) number of goals scored.

==== Group B ====
Pos	Team	Pld	W	D	L	GF	GA	GD	Pts	Qualification or relegation
1	Botafogo	6	5	1	0	15	5	+10	11	Qualified
2	Olaria	6	3	3	0	8	2	+6	9	Qualified
3	Fluminense	6	3	3	0	7	3	+4	9	Qualified
4	Bangu	6	1	2	3	11	13	−2	4	Qualified
5	Madureira	6	1	2	3	3	9	−6	4	
6	São Cristóvão	6	0	1	5	0	11	−11	1	

Updated to match(es) played on April 4, 1971. Source: RSSSF.com
Rules for classification: 1) points; 2) goal difference; 3) wins; 4) number of goals scored.

=== Final round ===
Pos	Team	Pld	W	D	L	GF	GA	GD	Pts	Qualification or relegation
1	Fluminense	14	8	5	1	23	10	+13	21	Champions
2	Flamengo	14	7	4	3	17	10	+7	18	
3	Botafogo	14	6	6	2	13	8	+5	18	
4	Olaria	14	6	5	3	21	11	+10	17	
5	Bangu	13	4	2	7	12	15	−3	10 (Note: América and Bangu forfeited their last match)	
6	América	13	2	6	5	8	12	−4	10	
7	Vasco da Gama	14	3	3	8	8	19	−11	9	
8	Bonsucesso	14	2	3	9	5	22	−17	7	

Updated to match(es) played on June 27, 1971. Source: RSSSF.com
Rules for classification: 1) points; 2) goal difference; 3) wins; 4) number of goals scored.

=== Taça Guanabara ===
Pos	Team	Pld	W	D	L	GF	GA	GD	Pts	Qualification or relegation
1	Fluminense	5	3	1	1	9	5	+4	7	Champions
2	Flamengo	5	2	1	2	4	5	−1	5	
3	Botafogo	4	2	0	2	3	4	−1	4	
4	América	4	1	2	1	2	3	−1	4	
5	Vasco da Gama	4	1	1	2	3	3	0	3	
6	Bangu	2	0	1	1	3	4	−1	1	Withdrew

Updated to match(es) played on August 1, 1971. Source: RSSSF.com
Rules for classification: 1) points; 2) goal difference; 3) wins; 4) number of goals scored.
