= 1970 Campeonato Brasileiro Série A =

Campeonato Brasileiro Série A
- Season: 1970
- Dates: 20 September - 20 December
- Champions: Fluminense (1st title)
- Copa Libertadores de América: Fluminense; Palmeiras
- Matches: 142
- Goals: 312 (2.2 per match)
- Top goalscorer: Tostão (12 goals)
- Total attendance: 2,876,778
- Average attendance: 20,259

The 1970 Campeonato Brasileiro Série A (officially the 1970 Torneio Roberto Gomes Pedrosa) was the 15th edition of the Campeonato Brasileiro Série A. It began on September 20 and ended on December 20. Palmeiras came as the defending champion having won the 1969 season and Fluminense won the championship, the first in the history of the club.

== Championship format ==
- First-phase: the 17 participants play all against all twice, but divided into two groups (one 8 and one 9) for classification, in the Group A, each team plays two more matches against any other. The first 2 of each group are classified for the finals.
- Final-phase: the four clubs classified play all against all in a single round. The club with most points at this stage is the champion.
- Tie-breaking criteria:

1 - Goal difference
2 - Raffle

- With one victory, a team still gained 2 points, instead of 3.

== First phase ==
=== Group A ===
Pos	Team	Pld	W	D	L	GF	GA	GD	Pts
1	Palmeiras	16	9	5	2	16	7	+9	23
2	Atlético Mineiro	16	7	6	3	21	13	+8	20
3	Botafogo	16	7	5	4	21	13	+8	19
4	Grêmio	16	6	6	4	17	13	+4	18
5	Santos	16	5	6	5	20	20	0	16
6	Bahia	16	5	5	6	11	18	−7	15
7	São Paulo	16	3	5	8	14	20	−6	11
8	América-RJ	16	2	6	8	15	23	−8	10

=== Group B ===
Pos	Team	Pld	W	D	L	GF	GA	GD	Pts
1	Cruzeiro	16	9	3	4	29	14	+15	21
2	Fluminense	16	8	4	4	26	16	+10	20
3	Flamengo	16	7	6	3	18	9	+9	20
4	Internacional	16	8	4	4	21	12	+9	20
5	Corinthians	16	5	6	5	16	15	+1	16
6	Santa Cruz	16	3	8	5	14	22	−8	14
7	Atlético-PR	16	4	4	8	13	22	−9	12
8	Ponte Preta	16	3	4	9	11	34	−23	10
9	Vasco	16	2	3	11	14	26	−12	7

== Final phase ==
Pos	Team	Pld	W	D	L	GF	GA	GD	Pts
1	Fluminense	3	2	1	0	3	1	+2	5
2	Palmeiras	3	2	0	1	7	3	+4	4
3	Atlético Mineiro	3	0	2	1	2	5	−3	2
4	Cruzeiro	3	0	1	2	3	6	−3	1

Matches:

13 December 1970
16:00 UTC−03:00

Fluminense	1 – 0	Palmeiras

Maracanã, Rio de Janeiro

13 December 1970
16:00 UTC−03:00

Cruzeiro	1 – 1	Atlético Mineiro

Mineirão, Belo Horizonte

16 December 1970
16:00 UTC−03:00

Cruzeiro	0 – 1	Fluminense

Mineirão, Belo Horizonte

16 December 1970
16:00 UTC−03:00

Palmeiras	3 – 0	Atlético Mineiro

Palestra Itália, São Paulo

20 December 1970
16:00 UTC−03:00

Palmeiras	4 – 2	Cruzeiro

Palestra Itália, São Paulo

20 December 1970
16:00 UTC−03:00

Fluminense	1 – 1	Atlético Mineiro

Maracanã, Rio de Janeiro

Torneio Roberto Gomes Pedrosa (Série A)
1970 champions

1st title
