= São Paulo state football team results (1901–1950) =

Matches by the São Paulo state football team

This is a list of results for all the matches played from 1901 to 1950 by the São Paulo state football team.

== Results ==
19 Oct 1901 Friendly	São Paulo (São Paulo (state))	2–2	Rio de Janeiro	São Paulo
	Jeffery; Alício		Frias; McCulloch	Stadium: Velódromo Paulistano
Note: First-ever match between Cariocas and Paulistas.

20 Oct 1901 Friendly	São Paulo (São Paulo (state))	0–0	Rio de Janeiro	São Paulo
				Stadium: Velódromo Paulistano

24 Jun 1906 Friendly	Rio de Janeiro	1–2	(São Paulo (state)) São Paulo	Rio de Janeiro
	Oscar Cox		Belfort Duarte	Stadium: Estádio das Laranjeiras

31 Jul 1906 International	São Paulo (São Paulo (state))	0–6	South Africa	São Paulo
			McIntyre; Tyler; Schmidt; Mason; Hartingan	Stadium: Velódromo Paulistano; Referee: R. T. Thorne (ENG)

4 Aug 1906 Friendly	São Paulo (São Paulo (state))	1–2	(Brazil) Botafogo	São Paulo
	Vevé		Goal	Stadium: Velódromo Paulistano

12 Oct 1906 Friendly	São Paulo (São Paulo (state))	0–2	Rio de Janeiro	São Paulo
			Goal	Stadium: Velódromo Paulistano

11 Nov 1906 Friendly	São Paulo (São Paulo (state))	4–3	(Brazil) Fluminense	São Paulo
	Friese; Léo; Rowlands; Charles Miller		Goal	Stadium: Velódromo Paulistano

9 Dec 1906 Friendly	São Paulo (São Paulo (state))	4–0	Rio de Janeiro	São Paulo
	Friese; Charles Miller			Stadium: Velódromo Paulistano

25 Aug 1907 Taça Brasil de Seleções	São Paulo (São Paulo (state))	4–1	Rio de Janeiro	São Paulo
	Léo; Oscar de Andrade; Aquino; Colston		Oswaldo Gomes	Stadium: Velódromo Paulistano

12 Oct 1907 Taça Brasil de Seleções	Rio de Janeiro	0–1	(São Paulo (state)) São Paulo	Rio de Janeiro
			Léo	Stadium: Rua Paysandu

5 Jul 1908 International	São Paulo (São Paulo (state))	0–6	Argentina	São Paulo
			M. Susán; Ernesto Brown; Eliseo Brown; Alfredo Brown	Stadium: Velódromo Paulistano; Referee: Hermann Friese (BRA)

7 Jul 1908 International	São Paulo (São Paulo (state))	0–4	Argentina	São Paulo
			F. Dickinson; M. Susán; Alfredo Brown; Ernesto Brown	Stadium: Velódromo Paulistano; Referee: Mariano Reyna (ARG)

2 Sep 1910 Friendly	São Paulo (São Paulo (state))	0–5	(England) Corinthian	São Paulo
			Snell; Day ? ?	Stadium: Velódromo Paulistano; Referee: A. Huntchinson (ENG)

15 Aug 1911 International	São Paulo (São Paulo (state))	2–2	Uruguay	São Paulo
	Facchini; Décio		Goal	Stadium: Velódromo Paulistano

8 Sep 1912 International	São Paulo (São Paulo (state))	3–6	Argentina	São Paulo
	Friedenreich 18'; Irineu 28'; Salles 30'		M. Susán 15', 25'; Ernesto Brown 32', 50', 81'; Hayes 60'	Stadium: Velódromo Paulistano; Referee: Mariano Reyna (ARG)

12 Nov 1912 Friendly	Rio Grande (Brazil)	0–6	(São Paulo (state)) São Paulo	Rio Grande
			Goal

14 Nov 1912 Friendly	Rio Branco (Bagé) (Brazil)	0–5	(São Paulo (state)) São Paulo	Bagé
			Goal

15 Nov 1912 Friendly	Rio Branco (Bagé) (Brazil)	1–8	(São Paulo (state)) São Paulo	Bagé
	Goal		Goal

17 Nov 1912 Friendly	Rio Grande (Brazil)	0–7	(São Paulo (state)) São Paulo	Rio Grande
			Goal

21 Nov 1912 Friendly	Grêmio (Brazil)	1–3	(São Paulo (state)) São Paulo	Porto Alegre
	Goal		Raul; Irineu

22 Nov 1912 Friendly	FC Porto Alegre (Brazil)	0–6	(São Paulo (state)) São Paulo	Porto Alegre
			Godinho; Salles; Irineu

25 Nov 1912 Friendly	Anita Garibaldi XI (Brazil)	0–7	(São Paulo (state)) São Paulo	Anita Garibaldi
			Goal

10 Aug 1913 International	Argentina	0–2	(São Paulo (state)) São Paulo	Avellaneda, Argentina
			Décio 33'; Juvenal 35'	Stadium: Estadio Racing Club; Referee: A. Hutchinson (USA)

15 Aug 1913 International	Uruguay	2–0	(São Paulo (state)) São Paulo	Montevideo, Uruguay
	Campistegui 16'; Gorla 47'			Stadium: Parque Central; Referee: A. Hutchinson (USA)

17 Aug 1913 International	Argentina	2–0	(São Paulo (state)) São Paulo	Buenos Aires, Argentina
	J. Viale 71'; M. Susan 84'			Stadium: Estadio G.E.B.A. Referee: O. Picudo (BRA)

20 Aug 1913 Friendly	San Isidro (Argentina)	3–1	(São Paulo (state)) São Paulo	Buenos Aires, Argentina
	Goal		Goal	Stadium: San Isidro; Referee: A. Hutchinson (USA)

23 Aug 1913 International	Uruguay	4–2	(São Paulo (state)) São Paulo	Montevideo, Uruguay
	Farinasso 5', 59'; Tagnola 48'; Gorla 52'		Moretti 60'; Formiga 87'	Stadium: Parque Central; Referee: A. Hutchinson (USA)

25 Sep 1913 International	São Paulo (São Paulo (state))	0–1	Chile	São Paulo
			Abello	Stadium: Parque Antártica; Referee: Belfort Duarte

27 Sep 1913 International	São Paulo (São Paulo (state))	1–3	Chile	São Paulo
	Peres		Valenzuela; Reginato; Guzmán	Stadium: Parque Antártica; Referee: Carlos Fanta (CHI)

16 Nov 1913 Taça Rio-São Paulo de Seleções	São Paulo (São Paulo (state))	0–0	Rio de Janeiro	São Paulo
				Stadium: Parque Antártica

28 Jun 1914 Taça Rio-São Paulo de Seleções	Rio de Janeiro	1–1	(São Paulo (state)) São Paulo	Rio de Janeiro
	Welfare		Juvenal	Stadium: Estádio das Laranjeiras

13 Aug 1914 Friendly	São Paulo (São Paulo (state))	2–1	(Italy) Pro Vercelli	São Paulo
	Friedenreich; Millon		Goal	Stadium: Parque Antártica

16 Aug 1914 Friendly	São Paulo (São Paulo (state))	1–7	(Italy) Torino	São Paulo
	Neco		Goal	Stadium: Parque Antártica

30 Aug 1914 Taça Rio-São Paulo de Seleções	São Paulo (São Paulo (state))	4–2	Rio de Janeiro	São Paulo
	Salles; Formiga; Demóstenes		Welfare; Ojeda	Stadium: Parque Antártica

27 Jun 1915 Taça Rio-São Paulo de Seleções	São Paulo (São Paulo (state))	2–1	Rio de Janeiro	São Paulo
	Nazaré; Demóstenes		Mimi Sodré	Stadium: Parque Antártica

3 Oct 1915 Taça Rio-São Paulo de Seleções	Rio de Janeiro	5–2	(São Paulo (state)) São Paulo	Rio de Janeiro
	Luís Menezes; Welfare; Pullen		Formiga; Hopkins	Stadium: Estádio das Laranjeiras

17 Oct 1915 Friendly	São Paulo (São Paulo (state))	2–1	(Brazil) Corinthians	São Paulo
	Demóstenes		Amílcar	Stadium: Velódromo Paulistano; Referee: Cunha Bueno

24 Oct 1915 Friendly	São Paulo (São Paulo (state))	2–1	(Brazil) Corinthians	São Paulo
	Goal		Goal	Stadium: Velódromo Paulistano

7 Nov 1915 Taça Rio-São Paulo de Seleções	São Paulo (São Paulo (state))	8–0	Rio de Janeiro	São Paulo
	Friedenreich; Demóstenes; MacLean; Formiga			Stadium: Velódromo Paulistano

13 Aug 1916 Taça Rio-São Paulo de Seleções	São Paulo (São Paulo (state))	5–0	Rio de Janeiro	São Paulo
	Friedenreich; MacLean; Hopkins			Stadium: Velódromo Paulistano

24 Sep 1916 Taça Rio-São Paulo de Seleções	Rio de Janeiro	1–3	(São Paulo (state)) São Paulo	Rio de Janeiro
	Luís Menezes		MacLean; Zacchi	Stadium: Estádio das Laranjeiras

14 Jan 1917 Friendly	São Paulo (São Paulo (state))	1–5	(Uruguay) Dublin	São Paulo
	Friedenreich		Goal	Stadium: Velódromo Paulistano

24 Jun 1917 Friendly	Rio de Janeiro	0–1	(São Paulo (state)) São Paulo	Rio de Janeiro
			Amílcar	Stadium: Estádio das Laranjeiras

29 Jul 1917 Friendly	São Paulo (São Paulo (state))	7–1	Rio de Janeiro	São Paulo
	Formiga; Chico Netto (o.g.); Vidal (o.g.); Arnaldo; Amílcar; Dias		Couto	Stadium: Chácara da Floresta

15 Aug 1917 Friendly	São Paulo (São Paulo (state))	5–3	(Brazil) Paulistano	São Paulo
	Goal		Goal	Stadium: Chácara da Floresta

19 Aug 1917 Friendly	Rio de Janeiro	3–3	(São Paulo (state)) São Paulo	Rio de Janeiro
	Couto; Benedicto; Chico Netto		Dias; Amílcar	Stadium: Estádio das Laranjeiras

15 Nov 1917 Friendly	Palestra Itália-SP (Brazil)	0–7	(São Paulo (state)) São Paulo	São Paulo
			Friedenreich; Dias; Rodrigues; Neco	Stadium: Parque Antártica; Referee: Ludovico Bacchiani

25 Dec 1917 Friendly	São Paulo (São Paulo (state))	9–1	Rio de Janeiro	São Paulo
	Friedenreich; Rodrigues; Dias; Neco		Welfare	Stadium: Chácara da Floresta

3 Feb 1918 Friendly	São Paulo (São Paulo (state))	1–0	(Uruguay) Dublin	São Paulo
	Arnaldo			Stadium: Chácara da Floresta

2 Jun 1918 Friendly	São Paulo (São Paulo (state))	4–2	Rio de Janeiro	São Paulo
	Friedenreich; Mário de Andrade; Neco		Zezé	Stadium: Chácara da Floresta

7 Jul 1918 Friendly	Rio de Janeiro	2–1	(São Paulo (state)) São Paulo	Rio de Janeiro
	Zezé		Arnaldo	Stadium: Estádio das Laranjeiras

4 Aug 1918 Friendly	Rio de Janeiro	3–2	(São Paulo (state)) São Paulo	Rio de Janeiro
	Carregal; Welfare		Haroldo; Friedenreich	Stadium: Estádio das Laranjeiras

1 Sep 1918 Friendly	São Paulo (São Paulo (state))	8–1	Rio de Janeiro	São Paulo
	Vidal (o.g.); Friedenreich; Haroldo; Formiga; Neco		Welfare	Stadium: Chácara da Floresta

13 Oct 1918 Friendly	São Paulo (São Paulo (state))	5–0	Rio de Janeiro	São Paulo
	Friedenreich; Américo; Neco; Haroldo			Stadium: Chácara da Floresta

5 Jun 1919 International	São Paulo (São Paulo (state))	2–1	Argentina	São Paulo
	Ministro 36'; Heitor 44'		Brichetto 59'	Stadium: Chácara da Floresta; Referee: Juan Barbera (ARG)

15 Jun 1919 Taça Füchs	São Paulo (São Paulo (state))	3–1	Rio de Janeiro	São Paulo
	Friedenreich 43' (pen.), 69'; Neco 62'		Machado 27'	Stadium: Chácara da Floresta; Referee: Benedicto Montenegro

6 Jul 1919 Taça Rodrigues Alves	Rio de Janeiro	2–4	(São Paulo (state)) São Paulo	Rio de Janeiro
	Welfare 8'; Bacchi 24'		Neco 10', 12', 53'; Haroldo 76'	Stadium: Estádio das Laranjeiras; Referee: Ferreira Netto

3 Jun 1920 Friendly	São Paulo (São Paulo (state))	1–2	(Brazil) Palestra Itália-SP	São Paulo
	Friedenreich		Ministro; Martinelli	Stadium: Chácara da Floresta

6 Jun 1920 Taça Rodrigues Alves	Rio de Janeiro	1–7	(São Paulo (state)) São Paulo	Rio de Janeiro
	Bacchi 12'		Friedenreich 25', 41', 49'; Andrada 32', 42'; Cassiano 79'; Formiga 80'	Stadium: Estádio das Laranjeiras; Referee: Henrique Boock

13 Jun 1920 Taça Afonso Camargo	Paraná (Paraná (state))	1–8	(São Paulo (state)) São Paulo	Curitiba
	Joaquim 45'		Ministro 3'; Friedenreich 15', 18', 40', 71'; Constantino 65', 90+'; Amílcar 76'	Stadium: Água Verde

14 Jun 1920 Friendly	Britânia (Brazil)	0–10	(São Paulo (state)) São Paulo	Curitiba
			Tito; Amílcar; Friedenreich; Cateano	Stadium: Água Verde

21 Jul 1920 Friendly	São Paulo (São Paulo (state))	4–4	(Brazil) AA São Bento	São Paulo
	Formiga; Heitor		Dias; Zucchi	Stadium: Chácara da Floresta

25 Jul 1920 Taça Rodrigues Alves	São Paulo (São Paulo (state))	2–2	Rio de Janeiro	São Paulo
	Neco 20'; Heitor 75'		Zezé 71'; Welfare 73'	Stadium: Chácara da Floresta; Referee: Carlos Santos

7 Sep 1920 Taça Afonso Camargo	São Paulo (São Paulo (state))	6–1	(Paraná (state)) Paraná	São Paulo
	Dias; Friedenreich; Sérgio; Teppet		Maximino	Stadium: Parque Antártica; Referee: Sílvio Lagreca

14 Aug 1921 Taça Afonso Camargo	Paraná (Paraná (state))	1–2	(São Paulo (state)) São Paulo	Curitiba
	Zito 13'		Viola 46'; Friedenreich 77'	Stadium: Campo da Graciosa; Referee: Luiz Guimarães

16 Aug 1921 Friendly	Coritiba (Brazil)	1–0	(São Paulo (state)) São Paulo	Curitiba
	Abílio			Stadium: Campo da Graciosa; Referee: Roger Maravalhas

13 May 1922 Taça Afonso Camargo	Paraná (Paraná (state))	1–3	(São Paulo (state)) São Paulo	Curitiba
	Tatú (o.g.)		Heitor; Gambarotta	Stadium: Água Verde; Referee: Sílvio Lagreca

14 May 1922 Friendly	Internacional-PR (Brazil)	1–9	(São Paulo (state)) São Paulo	Curitiba
	Goal		Goal	Stadium: Água Verde

14 Jul 1922 Taça Afonso Camargo	São Paulo (São Paulo (state))	8–3	(Paraná (state)) Paraná	São Paulo
	Neco; Rodrigues; Formiga; Friedenreich; Ministro		Joaquim; Arthurzinho; Maximino	Stadium: Chácara da Floresta; Referee: Ângelo Goria

16 Jul 1922 Friendly	São Paulo (São Paulo (state))	2–1	(Brazil) Sírio	São Paulo
	Heitor		Alberto	Stadium: Chácara da Floresta; Referee: Alfredo Gamba

23 Jul 1922 Brasileiro de Seleções	São Paulo (São Paulo (state))	13–0	Minas Gerais	São Paulo
	Formiga; Neco; Rodrigues; Friedenreich; Heitor			Stadium: Chácara da Floresta; Referee: Paulo Canongia

2 Aug 1922 Brasileiro de Seleções	São Paulo (São Paulo (state))	4–2	Rio Grande do Sul	São Paulo
	Friedenreich; Neco; Rodrigues		Barros	Stadium: Chácara da Floresta; Referee: Henrique Vinhaes

6 Aug 1922 Brasileiro de Seleções	São Paulo (São Paulo (state))	3–0	Bahia	São Paulo
	Neco; Friedenreich			Stadium: Parque Antártica; Referee: Paulo Canongia

13 Aug 1922 Brasileiro de Seleções	São Paulo (São Paulo (state))	4–1	Rio de Janeiro	São Paulo
	Rodrigues 14'; Friedenreich 25' (pen.), 78'; Neco 37'		Brilhante 55'	Stadium: Parque Antártica; Referee: Pedro dos Santos

27 Aug 1922 Friendly	Rio de Janeiro	1–2	(São Paulo (state)) São Paulo	Rio de Janeiro
	Zezé 9'		Formiga 34'; Friedenreich 56'	Stadium: General Severiano; Referee: Antônio Zecchi

10 Sep 1922 Friendly	São Paulo (São Paulo (state))	2–1	Basque Country	São Paulo
	Cabelli 20'; Neco 35'		Acosta 4'	Stadium: Chácara da Floresta

24 Sep 1922 Friendly	São Paulo (São Paulo (state))	3–2	(Czechoslovakia) Teplitzer FK	São Paulo
	Teppet; Cabelli; Ruyval		Schröder; Morway	Stadium: Chácara da Floresta

14 Jul 1923 Taça Washington Luís	São Paulo (São Paulo (state))	8–0	(Paraná (state)) Paraná	São Paulo
	Heitor 3', 8', 9', 15', 32', 44', 50'; Mathias 75'			Stadium: Chácara da Floresta; Referee: Augusto de Almeida

23 Sep 1923 Brasileiro de Seleções	São Paulo (São Paulo (state))	4–1	Rio Grande do Sul	São Paulo
	Netinho; Formiga; Barthô		Marcello	Stadium: Parque Antártica; Referee: Antônio Villas Boas

4 Oct 1923 Friendly	São Paulo (São Paulo (state))	5–2	(Brazil) Guarani	São Paulo
	Friedenreich; Rueda		Goal	Stadium: Chácara da Floresta; Referee: Antônio Dias

7 Oct 1923 Brasileiro de Seleções	São Paulo (São Paulo (state))	5–1	(Paraná (state)) Paraná	São Paulo
	Barthô; Friedenreich; Netinho; Rosas (o.g.)		Ciasca	Stadium: Chácara da Floresta; Referee: Eduardo Fonseca

12 Oct 1923 Taça Washington Luís	São Paulo (São Paulo (state))	1–1	(Paraná (state)) Paraná	São Paulo
	Feitiço		Joaquim	Stadium: Chácara da Floresta; Referee: Pedro Thomaz

28 Oct 1923 Brasileiro de Seleções	Rio de Janeiro	0–4	(São Paulo (state)) São Paulo	Rio de Janeiro
			Tatú 16', 21', 23'; Feitiço 80'	Stadium: Estádio das Laranjeiras; Referee: Leite de Castro

9 Nov 1924 Brasileiro de Seleções	São Paulo (São Paulo (state))	5–0	(Paraná (state)) Paraná	São Paulo
	Filó 5', 66'; Heitor 48', 56'; Feitiço 60'			Stadium: Chácara da Floresta; Referee: Ary de Azevedo

23 Nov 1924 Brasileiro de Seleções	São Paulo (São Paulo (state))	W/O	Rio Grande do Sul

21 Dec 1924 Brasileiro de Seleções	Rio de Janeiro	1–0	(São Paulo (state)) São Paulo	Rio de Janeiro
	Nilo 6'			Stadium: Estádio das Laranjeiras; Referee: Ary Amarante

26 Jul 1925 Brasileiro de Seleções	São Paulo (São Paulo (state))	6–1	(Paraná (state)) Paraná	São Paulo
	Feitiço; Formiga; Filó		Marrequinho	Stadium: Parque Antártica; Referee: Leite de Castro

2 Aug 1925 Brasileiro de Seleções	São Paulo (São Paulo (state))	4–0	Rio Grande do Sul	São Paulo
	Friedenreich; Neco; Filó; Andrada			Stadium: Parque Antártica; Referee: Leite de Castro

6 Sep 1925 Brasileiro de Seleções	Pará	0–3	(São Paulo (state)) São Paulo	Rio de Janeiro
			Formiga 25'; Friedenreich 51' (pen.), 70'	Stadium: Estádio das Laranjeiras; Referee: João de Deus Candiota

13 Sep 1925 Brasileiro de Seleções	Rio de Janeiro	1–1 (a.e.t.)	(São Paulo (state)) São Paulo	Rio de Janeiro
	Nilo 83'		Neco 10'	Stadium: Estádio das Laranjeiras; Referee: Leite de Castro

16 Sep 1925 Friendly	São Paulo (São Paulo (state))	8–0	Pará	São Paulo
	Petronilho de Brito; Araken; Filó; Hugo			Stadium: Chácara da Floresta; Referee: Francisco Céspede

20 Sep 1925 Brasileiro de Seleções	Rio de Janeiro	3–2	(São Paulo (state)) São Paulo	Rio de Janeiro
	Nilo 12'; Candiota 39'; Moderato 88'		Andrada 29'; Filó 73'	Stadium: Estádio das Laranjeiras; Referee: Leite de Castro

14 Jul 1926 Friendly	Paraná (Paraná (state))	3–7	(São Paulo (state)) São Paulo	Curitiba
	Marrequinho 61'; Staco 78'; Urbino 83'		Feitiço 1', 66', 75'; Araken 36', 56', 81'; Melle 87'	Stadium: Campo da Graciosa; Referee: Parahylio Borba

16 Jul 1926 Taça Raul Pontual	Palestra Itália-PR (Brazil)	1–1	(São Paulo (state)) São Paulo	Curitiba
	Canhoto 41'		Miguel 82'	Stadium: Campo da Graciosa; Referee: Alzemiro Ballio

19 Jul 1926 Friendly	Atlético Paranaense / Coritiba (Brazil)	2–9	(São Paulo (state)) São Paulo	Curitiba
	Urbino 45'; Marrequinho 80'		Camarão 10'; Feitiço 22', 44', 50', 75'; Araken 24', 37', 49', 87'	Stadium: Estádio Joaquim Américo; Referee: Alzemiro Ballio

19 Sep 1926 Friendly	Corinthians (Brazil)	4–8	(São Paulo (state)) São Paulo	São Paulo
	Pinheiro 75'; Miguel 76'; Gambinha 82', 88'		Petronilho de Brito 11', 44', 61', 63', 74'; Apparício 5', 78'	Stadium: Estádio da Ponte Grande; Referee: Francisco Bermudes

26 Sep 1926 Friendly	São Paulo (São Paulo (state))	16–0	Santa Catarina	São Paulo
	Petronilho de Brito 2', 21', 38', 47', 66', 70'; Apparício 17', 40'; Feitiço 18', 36'; Grané 50'; Heitor 74', 86', 89'; Aldo 75' (o.g.); Amílcar 80'			Stadium: Chácara da Floresta; Referee: Everaldo Tinoco

7 Oct 1926 Taça Raul Pontual	São Paulo (São Paulo (state))	7–0	(Brazil) Palestra Itália-PR	São Paulo
	Heitor 4', 13', 71'; Petronilho de Brito 23', 78'; Apparício 46'; Melle 50'			Stadium: Estádio da Ponte Grande; Referee: Parahylio Borba

10 Oct 1926 Brasileiro de Seleções	São Paulo (São Paulo (state))	5–3	Rio Grande do Sul	São Paulo
	Petronilho de Brito 20'; Apparício 35', 46', 79'; Feitiço 80'		Mario Reis 38', 71'; Paschoalito 60'	Stadium: Parque Antártica; Referee: Leite de Castro

24 Oct 1926 Brasileiro de Seleções	Bahia	1–13	(São Paulo (state)) São Paulo	Rio de Janeiro
	Reinaldo Manteiga 52'		Petronilho de Brito 13', 19', 25', 88', 89'; Feitiço 27', 36', 45', 75'; Melle 28'; Heitor 39'; Apparício 60', 81'	Stadium: Estádio das Laranjeiras; Referee: Ramos de Freitas

31 Oct 1926 Friendly	Santos FC (Brazil)	1–7	(São Paulo (state)) São Paulo	Santos
	Pedro		Victor; Filó; Friedenreich; Nabor	Stadium: Vila Belmiro; Referee: Edmundo Amorim

7 Nov 1926 Brasileiro de Seleções	Rio de Janeiro	2–3	(São Paulo (state)) São Paulo	Rio de Janeiro
	Paschoal 31', 53'		Feitiço 22'; Petronilho de Brito 47'; Heitor 68'	Stadium: Estádio das Laranjeiras; Referee: Leite de Castro

14 Nov 1926 Friendly	São Paulo (São Paulo (state))	1–2	(Argentina) Asociación Amateurs de Football	São Paulo
	Friedenreich		Simonsini	Stadium: Chácara da Floresta; Referee: Félix de Lima

17 Nov 1926 Friendly	São Paulo (São Paulo (state))	6–1	(Brazil) Santos FC	São Paulo
	Petronilho de Brito; Feitiço		Araken	Stadium: Estádio da Ponte Grande; Referee: Joaquim Almeida

28 Nov 1926 Friendly	São Paulo (São Paulo (state))	8–1	Rio de Janeiro	São Paulo
	Tedesco 5'; Petronilho de Brito 7', 26'; Feitiço 18', 73', 87'; Melle 15'; Neco 31'		Russinho 63'	Stadium: Parque Antártica; Referee: Everaldo Tinoco

28 Nov 1926 Friendly	São Paulo (São Paulo (state))	2–5	(Argentina) Asociación Amateurs de Football	São Paulo
	Mário Seixas		Penella; Luna; Ferreyra	Stadium: Parque Antártica; Referee: Leon Wolvard

12 Oct 1927 Brasileiro de Seleções	Maranhão	1–13	(São Paulo (state)) São Paulo	Rio de Janeiro
	Zezico 8' (pen.)		Feitiço 15', 21', 63', 79'; Araken 17', 43', 45+2', 62', 68'; Evangelista 19', 85'; Tedesco 31'; Heitor 48'	Stadium: São Januário; Referee: Homero Mesquita

23 Oct 1927 Brasileiro de Seleções	Espírito Santo	0–5	(São Paulo (state)) São Paulo	Rio de Janeiro
			Feitiço 36', 55', 73'; Heitor 9'; Araken 70'	Stadium: Estádio das Laranjeiras; Referee: Antônio Ribeiro

30 Oct 1927 Brasileiro de Seleções	Bahia	1–7	(São Paulo (state)) São Paulo	Rio de Janeiro
	Loschiavo 44'		Heitor 12'; Petronilho de Brito 33', 49', 64', 74', 80'; Feitiço 46'	Stadium: São Januário; Referee: Carlos Rocha

6 Nov 1927 Friendly	Corinthians (Brazil)	5–3	(São Paulo (state)) São Paulo	São Paulo
	Apparício; Neco; Ratto		Heitor; Araken; Petronilho de Brito	Stadium: Parque Antártica; Referee: Benjamin Belivaqcua

10 Nov 1927 Friendly	Corinthians (Brazil)	1–6	(São Paulo (state)) São Paulo	São Paulo
	Goal		Petronilho de Brito; Araken; Grané; Evangelista	Stadium: Parque Antártica

12 Nov 1927 Brasileiro de Seleções	Rio de Janeiro	2–1	(São Paulo (state)) São Paulo	Rio de Janeiro
	Oswaldinho 35'; Fortes 58'		Feitiço 10'	Stadium: São Januário; Referee: Ary Amarante

15 Jan 1928 Friendly	São Paulo (São Paulo (state))	0–5	Rio de Janeiro	São Paulo
			Ennes; Pio; Renato; Sá; Doca	Stadium: Chácara da Floresta; Referee: Ancient Paiva

25 Mar 1928 Taça Castelões	São Paulo (São Paulo (state))	9–1	Rio de Janeiro	São Paulo
	Friedenreich; Feitiço; Peres; Rueda		Bahianinho	Stadium: Chácara da Floresta; Referee: B. Ferramenta

5 May 1928 Friendly	São Paulo (São Paulo (state))	4–0	(Uruguay) Peñarol	São Paulo
	Apparício; Heitor; De Maria			Stadium: Chácara da Floresta; Referee: Antônio Villas Boas

4 Nov 1928 Friendly	São Paulo (São Paulo (state))	8–2	Espírito Santo	São Paulo
	Heitor; De Maria; Ratto; Feitiço		Rogério	Stadium: Parque São Jorge; Referee: Antônio Villas Boas

28 Nov 1928 Friendly	Santos XI (Brazil)	5–0	(São Paulo (state)) São Paulo	Santos
	Araken; Feitiço; Siriri			Stadium: Vila Belmiro; Referee: Aniello Annunziato

20 Jan 1929 Friendly	São Paulo (São Paulo (state))	6–2	Rio de Janeiro	São Paulo
	Pedrinho; Friedenreich; Pixo		Bahianinho; Mica	Stadium: Campo do Independência; Referee: Sylvio Vinhas

3 Feb 1929 Friendly	São Paulo (São Paulo (state))	5–1	(Brazil) Santos XI	São Paulo
	Ministro; Pedrinho; Filó		Cruz	Stadium: Parque Antártica; Referee: Victorio Sylvestre

22 Feb 1929 Friendly	São Paulo (São Paulo (state))	2–2	(Uruguay) Rampla Juniors	Rio de Janeiro
	Heitor; Petronilho de Brito		Labraga; Haberli	Stadium: São Januário; Referee: Gilberto Almeida Rego

3 Mar 1929 Friendly	Rio de Janeiro	3–2	(São Paulo (state)) São Paulo	Rio de Janeiro
	Mimi Sodré 26', 52'; Tainha 40'		Mathias 40'; Sorrentino 48'	Stadium: São Januário; Referee: João Caetano Baptista

28 Apr 1929 Friendly	São Paulo (São Paulo (state))	3–0	(Argentina) Sportivo Barracas	São Paulo
	Petronilho de Brito; Feitiço; Evangelista			Stadium: Parque Antártica; Referee: Servando Pérez (ARG)

3 May 1929 Friendly	São Paulo (São Paulo (state))	4–1	Rio de Janeiro	São Paulo
	Friedenreich 63', 75', 86'; Filó 80'		Ennes 25'	Stadium: Estádio da Ponte Grande; Referee: Oscar Coelho

23 Jun 1929 Friendly	São Paulo (São Paulo (state))	1–0	(Uruguay) Rampla Juniors	São Paulo
	Camarão			Stadium: Estádio da Ponte Grande; Referee: Eugenio Medgyesy

23 Jun 1929 Friendly	Rio de Janeiro	4–3	(São Paulo (state)) São Paulo	Rio de Janeiro
	Careca; Pinho; Ennes; Coruja		Filó; Friedenreich	Stadium: Rua José Patrocínio; Referee: Edmundo Amorim

30 Jun 1929 Taça V. Lia Torá	São Paulo (São Paulo (state))	1–2	(Hungary) Ferencváros	São Paulo
	Feitiço 5'		Takacs 64', 72'	Stadium: Parque Antártica; Referee: Vicente Decap (URU)

7 Jul 1929 Friendly	São Paulo (São Paulo (state))	3–1	(England) Chelsea	São Paulo
	Feitiço 16', 86' (pen.); Araken 34'		A. Wilson 15'	Stadium: Parque Antártica; Referee: Francisco Céspede

28 Jul 1929 Taça Broadway Melody	São Paulo (São Paulo (state))	6–4	(Italy) Bologna	São Paulo
	Feitiço 29', 52' (pen.), 70'; Camarão 51'; Petronilho de Brito 80'; Evangelista 88'		Banchero 5', 12'; Constantino 27', 81'	Stadium: Antarctica Paulista; Referee: Enrico Sabattini (ITA)

11 Aug 1929 Friendly	São Paulo (São Paulo (state))	1–1	(Portugal) Vitória de Setúbal	São Paulo
	Camarão 31'		Neves 45'	Stadium: Parque Antártica; Referee: Antônio Villas Boas

18 Aug 1929 Friendly	São Paulo (São Paulo (state))	2–1	(Hungary) Ferencváros	São Paulo
	Ratto 10'; Carrone 11'		Takacs 80'	Stadium: Parque Antártica; Referee: Antônio Villas Boas

8 Sep 1929 Friendly	São Paulo (São Paulo (state))	2–0	Rio de Janeiro	São Paulo
	De Maria 11', 57'			Stadium: Parque São Jorge; Referee: Ary Amarante

10 Sep 1929 Taça Giorgi Pirelli	São Paulo (São Paulo (state))	1–3	(Italy) Bologna	São Paulo
	Evangelista 38'		Busini 14'; Banchero 24'; Constantino 53'	Stadium: Parque Antártica; Referee: Felamer (ITA)

14 Sep 1929 Friendly	São Paulo (São Paulo (state))	6–1	(Italy) Torino	São Paulo
	De Maria; Grané; Carrone		Chini	Stadium: Parque Antártica; Referee: Schiavone (ITA)

6 Oct 1929 Friendly	Santos XI (Brazil)	1–0	(São Paulo (state)) São Paulo	Santos
	Miro			Stadium: Estádio Ulrico Mursa

13 Oct 1929 Taça Júlio Prestes	São Paulo (São Paulo (state))	5–3	Rio de Janeiro	São Paulo
	Dendi; Araken; Friedenreich		Ernani; Pinho; Barthô (o.g.)	Stadium: Estádio da Ponte Grande; Referee: Oscar Bastos Coelho

27 Oct 1929 Brasileiro de Seleções	São Paulo (São Paulo (state))	10–1	(Paraná (state)) Paraná	São Paulo
	Pizzatto (o.g.); Feitiço; Heitor; Petronilho de Brito; De Maria; Ministrinho		Urbino	Stadium: Parque Antártica; Referee: Cyro Werneck

10 Nov 1929 Friendly	Santos XI (Brazil)	1–5	(São Paulo (state)) São Paulo	Santos
	Evangelista		Feitiço; Heitor; Petronilho de Brito; De Maria	Stadium: Vila Belmiro

15 Nov 1929 Brasileiro de Seleções	São Paulo (São Paulo (state))	9–0	Rio Grande do Sul	São Paulo
	Petronilho de Brito; Feitiço; De Maria; Ministrinho			Stadium: Parque Antártica; Referee: Gilberto Almeida Rego

24 Nov 1929 Brasileiro de Seleções	São Paulo (São Paulo (state))	7–1	Bahia	São Paulo
	Heitor; Feitiço; De Maria		Pelágio	Stadium: Parque Antártica; Referee: Álvaro Silva

8 Dec 1929 Brasileiro de Seleções	Rio de Janeiro	1–4	(São Paulo (state)) São Paulo	Rio de Janeiro
	Russinho 19'		Petronilho de Brito 9'; De Maria 11'; Feitiço 15', 88'	Stadium: Estádio das Laranjeiras; Referee: William Rowlands

22 Dec 1929 Brasileiro de Seleções	São Paulo (São Paulo (state))	3–3 (a.e.t.)	Rio de Janeiro	São Paulo
	Petronilho de Brito 10', 71'; Tinoco 43' (o.g.)		Russinho 19', 51' (pen.), 61'	Stadium: Parque Antártica; Referee: Carlos Rocha

29 Dec 1929 Brasileiro de Seleções	Rio de Janeiro	3–1	(São Paulo (state)) São Paulo	Rio de Janeiro
	Doca 1'; Russinho 33'; Paschoal 85'		Gambinha 28'	Stadium: Estádio das Laranjeiras; Referee: Alzemiro Ballio

12 Jan 1930 Brasileiro de Seleções	São Paulo (São Paulo (state))	4–2	Rio de Janeiro	São Paulo
	Gambinha 29'; De Maria 38', 55'; Heitor 46'		Russinho 51', 90'	Stadium: Parque São Jorge; Referee: Carlos Rocha

26 Mar 1930 Friendly	São Paulo (São Paulo (state))	4–2	(Brazil) Internacional-SP	São Paulo
	De Maria; Friedenreich; Heitor		Campos; Sorrentino	Stadium: Chácara da Floresta; Referee: Cahouby Reis

28 Mar 1930 Friendly	São Paulo (São Paulo (state))	8–1	(Argentina) Sportivo Buenos Aires	São Paulo
	Ratto 11'; Filó 16', 17'; Heitor 20'; De Maria 38', 55', 73'; Friedenreich 60'		Arrillaga 66'	Stadium: Chácara da Floresta; Referee: William Rowlands

19 Jun 1930 Friendly	São Paulo (São Paulo (state))	3–1	(United States) New York Hakoah	São Paulo
	Friedenreich 34'; Petronilho de Brito 52'; Feitiço 69'		Del Debbio 46' (o.g.)	Stadium: Parque Antártica; Referee: Alzemiro Ballio

22 Jun 1930 Friendly	Paraná (Paraná (state))	1–3	(São Paulo (state)) São Paulo	Curitiba
	Vani 85'		Grané 11' (pen.); Feitiço 16'; De Maria 36'	Stadium: Água Verde; Referee: Eduardo Panariello

6 Apr 1931 Friendly	Rio de Janeiro	6–1	(São Paulo (state)) São Paulo	Rio de Janeiro
	Carvalho Leite 10', 37', 58', 60', 65'; Teóphilo 47'		De Maria 50'	Stadium: Estádio das Laranjeiras; Referee: Carlos Rocha

19 Apr 1931 Friendly	São Paulo (São Paulo (state))	1–3	(Uruguay) Bella Vista	São Paulo
	Grané		Castro; Borjas	Stadium: Parque Antártica; Referee: Karl Strobel

16 Jul 1931 Friendly	São Paulo (São Paulo (state))	3–2	(Brazil) Internacional-SP	São Paulo
	Petronilho de Brito; Victor; Friedenreich		Gomes; Joca	Stadium: Estádio da Ponte Grande; Referee: Domingos Olmos

19 Jul 1931 Brasileiro de Seleções	São Paulo (São Paulo (state))	6–4	(Paraná (state)) Paraná	São Paulo
	Siriri 36'; Heitor 40', 67'; Luisinho 41', 55'; Feitiço 54'		Gabardino 2', 85'; Vani 26'; Emílio 79'	Stadium: Chácara da Floresta; Referee: Virgílio Fredrigh

26 Jul 1931 Friendly	Palestra Itália-SP (Brazil)	4–1	(São Paulo (state)) São Paulo	São Paulo
	Pepico 20', 89' (pen.); Gogliardo 51'; Romeu 60'		Paschoalino 66'	Stadium: Parque Antártica; Referee: João Chiavone

2 Aug 1931 Friendly	São Paulo (São Paulo (state))	9–2	(Brazil) Santos FC	São Paulo
	Waldemar de Brito 2', 31'; Luisinho 21', 42'; Friedenreich 27', 63' (pen.), 73', 87'; Lara 88'		Logu 11'; Feitiço 90'	Stadium: Chácara da Floresta; Referee: Karl Strobel

9 Aug 1931 Brasileiro de Seleções	São Paulo (São Paulo (state))	1–0	Rio Grande do Sul	São Paulo
	Feitiço 49'			Stadium: Chácara da Floresta; Referee: Virgílio Fredrigh

16 Aug 1931 Brasileiro de Seleções	São Paulo (São Paulo (state))	11–3	Pernambuco	São Paulo
	Luisinho; Gogliardo; Siriri; Feitiço; Waldemar de Brito; Friedenreich		Osvaldo; Sebastião; Julinho	Stadium: Chácara da Floresta; Referee: Karl Strobel

23 Aug 1931 Brasileiro de Seleções	Rio de Janeiro	3–1	(São Paulo (state)) São Paulo	Rio de Janeiro
	Teóphilo 17'; Wálter 50'; Russinho 85'		Petronilho de Brito 30'	Stadium: São Januário; Referee: Domingos Olmo

30 Aug 1931 Brasileiro de Seleções	São Paulo (São Paulo (state))	3–0	Rio de Janeiro	São Paulo
	Feitiço 2'; Friedenreich 63', 75'			Stadium: Parque São Jorge; Referee: Virgílio Fredrigh

13 Sep 1931 Brasileiro de Seleções	Rio de Janeiro	3–0	(São Paulo (state)) São Paulo	Rio de Janeiro
	Leônidas 5', 80'; Carvalho Leite 15'			Stadium: São Januário; Referee: Virgílio Fredrigh

22 Jul 1932 Friendly	São Paulo (São Paulo (state))	1–2	Rio de Janeiro	São Paulo
	Luisinho 32'		Carvalho Leite 23'; Junqueira (o.g.)	Stadium: Chácara da Floresta; Referee: Alderico Solon

5 Jul 1932 Friendly	Rio de Janeiro	2–3	(São Paulo (state)) São Paulo	Rio de Janeiro
	Ivan 35'; Nilo 53'		Imparato 5'; Romeu 16' (pen.); Luisinho 19'	Stadium: Estádio das Laranjeiras; Referee: Theóphilo Osses

22 Jan 1933 Friendly	Santos XI (Brazil)	2–4	(São Paulo (state)) São Paulo	Santos
	Juquiá 22'; Cruz 75'		Imparato 11', 45'; Armandinho 20'; Romeu 66'	Stadium: Estádio Ulrico Mursa; Referee: Cândido de Barros

28 Mar 1933 Friendly	São Paulo (São Paulo (state))	1–4	(Brazil) Portuguesa	São Paulo
	Waldemar de Brito		Paschoalino; Carioca; Orozimbo; Luna	Stadium: Chácara da Floresta; Referee: Enéas Sgarzi

9 Apr 1933 Friendly	Rio de Janeiro	2–2	(São Paulo (state)) São Paulo	Rio de Janeiro
	Carnieri; Orlando		Itália (o.g.); Romeu	Stadium: São Januário; Referee: Arthur Friedenreich

23 Apr 1933 Friendly	São Paulo (São Paulo (state))	3–1	Rio de Janeiro	São Paulo
	Feitiço 27'; Imparato 76'; Mendes 85'		Said 6'	Stadium: Parque São Jorge; Referee: Haroldo Dias

11 Oct 1933 Friendly	Rio de Janeiro	2–0	(São Paulo (state)) São Paulo	Rio de Janeiro
	Preguinho 11'; Gradim 63'			Stadium: Estádio das Laranjeiras; Referee: Arthur Friedenreich

15 Oct 1933 Friendly	São Paulo (São Paulo (state))	2–1	(Brazil) Botafogo	São Paulo
	Raul; Pupo		Carvalho Leite	Stadium: Rua Javari; Referee: Mário Passerotti

15 Nov 1933 Friendly	Botafogo (Brazil)	5–1	(São Paulo (state)) São Paulo	Rio de Janeiro
	Áttila; Pirica; Carvalho Leite; Nilo		Raul	Stadium: General Severiano; Referee: Oswaldo Travassos

17 Dec 1933 Brasileiro de Seleções (FBF)	São Paulo (São Paulo (state))	5–1	(Rio de Janeiro (state)) Rio de Janeiro (Countryside)	São Paulo
	Romeu 18'; Gabardo 55'; Hércules 62'; Luisinho 70'; Mário Seixas 75'		Mamão 10'	Stadium: Chácara da Floresta; Referee: Alderico Solon

24 Dec 1933 Brasileiro de Seleções (FBF)	São Paulo (São Paulo (state))	8–0	(Paraná (state)) Paraná	São Paulo
	Waldemar de Brito; Gabardo; Hércules; Romeu			Stadium: Chácara da Floresta; Referee: Alderico Solon

31 Dec 1933 Brasileiro de Seleções (FBF)	São Paulo (São Paulo (state))	2–1 (a.e.t.)	Rio de Janeiro	São Paulo
	Waldemar de Brito 12'; Luisinho 91'		Gradim 59'	Stadium: Parque Antártica; Referee: Aníbal Tejada (URU)

7 Jan 1934 Brasileiro de Seleções (FBF)	Rio de Janeiro	1–2 (a.e.t.)	(São Paulo (state)) São Paulo	Rio de Janeiro
	Gradim 6'		Zarzur 38'; Hércules 94'	Stadium: São Januário; Referee: Aníbal Tejada (URU)

14 Jan 1934 Brasileiro de Seleções (CBD)	Brazilian Navy XI (Brazil)	2–3	(São Paulo (state)) São Paulo	Rio de Janeiro
	Zé Luiz; Paranhos		Peluso; Pupo; Orlando	Stadium: General Severiano; Referee: Jayme Guimarães

4 Feb 1934 Brasileiro de Seleções (CBD)	Espírito Santo	2–4	(São Paulo (state)) São Paulo	Rio de Janeiro
	Alcy		Mamede; Orlando	Stadium: General Severiano; Referee: Sebastião Cesário

4 Mar 1934 Brasileiro de Seleções (CBD)	Bahia	4–2	(São Paulo (state)) São Paulo	Salvador
	Mila; Gia; Popo; Betinho		Gino	Stadium: Estádio da Graça; Referee: Anísio Silva

8 Mar 1934 Brasileiro de Seleções (CBD)	Bahia	2–3	(São Paulo (state)) São Paulo	Salvador
	Goal		Goal	Stadium: Estádio da Graça

11 Mar 1934 Brasileiro de Seleções (CBD)	Bahia	2–0	(São Paulo (state)) São Paulo	Salvador
	Coringa; Bráz			Stadium: Estádio da Graça; Referee: Genebaldo Figueiredo

18 Mar 1934 Friendly	Ypiranga-BA (Brazil)	0–4	(São Paulo (state)) São Paulo	Salvador
			Goal	Stadium: Estádio da Graça

19 Mar 1934 Friendly	São Félix XI (Brazil)	1–2	(São Paulo (state)) São Paulo	São Félix
	Goal		Goal

20 Mar 1934 Friendly	Vitória (Brazil)	2–1	(São Paulo (state)) São Paulo	Salvador
	Raul; Popo		Orlando	Stadium: Estádio da Graça; Referee: Lido Piccinini

25 Mar 1934 Friendly	Ilhéus XI (Brazil)	1–1	(São Paulo (state)) São Paulo	Ilhéus
	Goal		Goal

5 Jul 1934 Friendly	Rio de Janeiro	1–0	(São Paulo (state)) São Paulo	Rio de Janeiro
	Russo 50'			Stadium: São Januário; Referee: Arthur Friedenreich

15 Jul 1934 Friendly	São Paulo (São Paulo (state))	1–3	Rio de Janeiro	São Paulo
	Romeu 30'		Gradim 11'; Nena 73', 78'	Stadium: Parque Antártica; Referee: Arthur Friedenreich

7 Nov 1934 Brasileiro de Seleções (FBF)	São Paulo (São Paulo (state))	7–4	(Paraná (state)) Paraná	São Paulo
	Mendes; Romeu; Vicente; Mamede		Wilson; Pizzatinho; Teleco; Gildo	Stadium: Parque Antártica; Referee: Oswaldo Kropf

11 Nov 1934 Brasileiro de Seleções (FBF)	Rio de Janeiro	2–0	(São Paulo (state)) São Paulo	Rio de Janeiro
	Nena 39'; Gradim 85'			Stadium: São Januário; Referee: Alzemiro Ballio

15 Nov 1934 Brasileiro de Seleções (FBF)	São Paulo (São Paulo (state))	2–1	Rio de Janeiro	São Paulo
	Mendes 22' (pen.); Romeu 77'		Nena 79'	Stadium: Parque Antártica; Referee: Lóris Valdetaro Cordovil

18 Nov 1934 Brasileiro de Seleções (FBF)	Rio de Janeiro	1–3	(São Paulo (state)) São Paulo	Rio de Janeiro
	Nena 42'		Mendes 10', 22', 80' (pen.)	Stadium: Estádio das Laranjeiras; Referee: Edgard Marques

26 Mar 1935 Friendly	São Paulo (São Paulo (state))	4–1	(Brazil) Juventus	São Paulo
	Carnieri; Gabardo		Moacir	Stadium: Chácara da Floresta; Referee: Antônio Janeiro

31 Mar 1935 Brasileiro de Seleções (CBD)	São Paulo (São Paulo (state))	3–1	Rio Grande do Sul	São Paulo
	Mendes; Gabardo		Luiz de Carvalho	Stadium: Chácara da Floresta; Referee: Virgílio Fredrigh

7 Apr 1935 Brasileiro de Seleções (CBD)	Rio de Janeiro	5–2	(São Paulo (state)) São Paulo	Rio de Janeiro
	Carreiro 15', 18', 81'; Carvalho Leite 33', 89'		Mendes 72' (pen.); Romeu 82'	Stadium: São Januário; Referee: José Alexandrino

14 Apr 1935 Brasileiro de Seleções (CBD)	São Paulo (São Paulo (state))	3–2	Rio de Janeiro	São Paulo
	Mendes 30'; Imparato 44', 79'		Carreiro 8'; Nena 74'	Stadium: Chácara da Floresta; Referee: Alderico Solon

1 May 1935 Friendly	Santos FC (Brazil)	3–3	(São Paulo (state)) São Paulo	Santos
	Raul 13'; Zé Carlos 44'; Sacy 60'		Mamede 23'; Neves 76' (o.g.); Brandão 89'	Stadium: Vila Belmiro; Referee: Heitor Marcelino Domingues

5 May 1935 Brasileiro de Seleções (CBD)	Rio de Janeiro	2–1	(São Paulo (state)) São Paulo	Rio de Janeiro
	Nena 10', 47'		Romeu 59' (pen.)	Stadium: São Januário; Referee: Heitor Marcelino Domingues

11 Aug 1935 Friendly	São Paulo (São Paulo (state))	2–1	(Brazil) Santos XI	São Paulo
	Mendes		Nabor	Stadium: Parque Antártica; Referee: Júlio de Almeida

15 Aug 1935 Friendly	Santos XI (Brazil)	3–2	(São Paulo (state)) São Paulo	Santos
	China; Delson		Ratto; Mendes	Stadium: Vila Belmiro; Referee: Heitor Marcelino Domingues

1 Dec 1935 Brasileiro de Seleções (FBF)	São Paulo (São Paulo (state))	W/O	(Brazil) Brazilian Navy XI

1 Dec 1935 Friendly	São Paulo (São Paulo (state))	3–2	(Brazil) Ypiranga-SP	São Paulo
	Paschoalino; Teleco		Nelson; Vasco	Stadium: Parque Antártica; Referee: Antônio Janeiro

8 Dec 1935 Brasileiro de Seleções (FBF)	São Paulo (São Paulo (state))	3–1	Minas Gerais	São Paulo
	Paschoalino 28'; Paulo 33'; Carioca 85'		Bernardino 55'	Stadium: Estádio da Ponte Grande; Referee: Casemiro Santa Maria

15 Dec 1935 Brasileiro de Seleções (FBF)	Rio de Janeiro	5–1	(São Paulo (state)) São Paulo	Rio de Janeiro
	Hércules; Plácido		Barros	Stadium: Estádio das Laranjeiras; Referee: Guilherme Gomes

15 Dec 1935 Friendly	São Paulo (São Paulo (state))	8–5	Rio de Janeiro	São Paulo
	Luisinho 21'; Mathias 40' (pen.); Araken 46', 58', 78'; Sacy 52'; Teleco 60'; Tuffy 66'		Gradim 7', 28', 84'; Russinho 67'; Kuko 88'	Stadium: Parque Antártica; Referee: Lóris Valdetaro Cordovil

22 Dec 1935 Brasileiro de Seleções (FBF)	São Paulo (São Paulo (state))	2–3	Rio de Janeiro	São Paulo
	Russo 8' (o.g.); Fiorotti 35'		Bahianinho 50'; Plácido 74'; Hércules 88'	Stadium: Parque Antártica; Referee: Manuel Nunes

22 Dec 1935 Friendly	Rio de Janeiro	4–1	(São Paulo (state)) São Paulo	Rio de Janeiro
	Orlando; Leônidas; Patesko		Sacy	Stadium: São Januário; Referee: Heitor Marcelino Domingues

31 May 1936 Brasileiro de Seleções	São Paulo (São Paulo (state))	4–2	Bahia	São Paulo
	Teleco 15', 16'; Armandinho 40'; Brandão 64'		Lindinho 13' (pen.); Dede 86'	Stadium: Parque Antártica; Referee: Heitor Marcelino Domingues

7 Jun 1936 Brasileiro de Seleções	São Paulo (São Paulo (state))	6–0	Bahia	São Paulo
	Teleco 8', 51', 68', 70', 83'; Mendes 45'			Stadium: Parque São Jorge; Referee: Henrique Faillace

3 Jul 1936 Friendly	Santos / Portuguesa Santista (Brazil)	2–4	(São Paulo (state)) São Paulo	Santos
	Vega; Raul		Tedesco; Araken; Luisinho; Mendes	Stadium: Vila Belmiro; Referee: Júlio de Almeida

16 Jul 1936 Brasileiro de Seleções	Rio Grande do Sul	2–1 (a.e.t.)	(São Paulo (state)) São Paulo	Porto Alegre
	Foguinho 30'; Cardeal 96'		Imparato 48'	Stadium: Estádio da Timbaúva; Referee: Henrique Faillace

26 Jul 1936 Brasileiro de Seleções	São Paulo (São Paulo (state))	3–1	Rio Grande do Sul	São Paulo
	Tim 15'; Luisinho 65' (pen.); Araken 78'		Mix 40'	Stadium: Parque Antártica; Referee: Heitor Marcelino Domingues

2 Aug 1936 Brasileiro de Seleções	Rio Grande do Sul	1–2	(São Paulo (state)) São Paulo	Rio de Janeiro
	Cardeal 15'		Luisinho 30'; Teleco 70'	Stadium: São Januário; Referee: José Pinto Lopes

1 Dec 1936 Friendly	São Paulo (São Paulo (state))	2–1	Rio de Janeiro	Santos
	Teleco 13'; Mathias 38'		Carreiro 52'	Stadium: Vila Belmiro; Referee: Carlos Monteiro

15 Dec 1938 Brasileiro de Seleções	São Paulo (São Paulo (state))	1–0	(Paraná (state)) Paraná	São Paulo
	Araken 50'			Stadium: Parque Antártica; Referee: Carlos Monteiro

31 Jan 1939 Brasileiro de Seleções	São Paulo (São Paulo (state))	9–0	Pará	São Paulo
	Rolando; Teleco; Araken; Mendes; Luisinho			Stadium: Parque Antártica; Referee: Mário Vianna

8 Feb 1939 Brasileiro de Seleções	São Paulo (São Paulo (state))	4–2	Rio de Janeiro	São Paulo
	Armandinho 6'; Teleco 15', 60'; Araken 38'		Valdemar 9'; Carreiro 50'	Stadium: Parque Antártica; Referee: Mário Vianna

12 Feb 1939 Brasileiro de Seleções	Rio de Janeiro	3–1	(São Paulo (state)) São Paulo	Rio de Janeiro
	Carreiro 18'; Romeu 32'; Carvalho Leite 86'		Araken 25'	Stadium: São Januário; Referee: Arthur Cidrin

15 Feb 1939 Brasileiro de Seleções	Rio de Janeiro	0–0	(São Paulo (state)) São Paulo	Rio de Janeiro
				Stadium: São Januário; Referee: Victor Ferreira

10 Mar 1939 Brasileiro de Seleções	São Paulo (São Paulo (state))	1–3	Rio de Janeiro	São Paulo
	Teleco 17'		Sá 55'; Carvalho Leite 74', 80'	Stadium: Parque Antártica; Referee: Mário Vianna

3 Dec 1939 Brasileiro de Seleções	São Paulo (São Paulo (state))	6–1	Rio Grande do Sul	São Paulo
	Canhoto 37', 62'; Brandão 44'; Teleco 54', 69', 78'		Carlitos 88'	Stadium: Parque Antártica; Referee: Carlos Monteiro

10 Dec 1939 Brasileiro de Seleções	São Paulo (São Paulo (state))	W/O	Bahia

14 Dec 1939 Brasileiro de Seleções	Rio de Janeiro	5–1	(São Paulo (state)) São Paulo	Rio de Janeiro
	Carvalho Leite 13', 71'; Carreiro 15', 63'; Romeu 54'		Teleco 40'	Stadium: São Januário; Referee: Carlos Monteiro

17 Dec 1939 Brasileiro de Seleções	São Paulo (São Paulo (state))	3–2	Rio de Janeiro	São Paulo
	Servílio 9'; Teleco 12', 37'		Romeu 67'; Og Moreira 87'	Stadium: Parque Antártica; Referee: Antenor Ávila

23 Dec 1939 Brasileiro de Seleções	Rio de Janeiro	4–1	(São Paulo (state)) São Paulo	Rio de Janeiro
	Romeu 31'; Carvalho Leite 40'; Carreiro 70', 80'		Teleco 32'	Stadium: São Januário; Referee: Ari Luna

29 Dec 1940 Brasileiro de Seleções	São Paulo (São Paulo (state))	2–1	Rio Grande do Sul	São Paulo
	Remo 10'; Teleco 23'		Tupa 14'	Stadium: Estádio do Pacaembu; Referee: Mario Vianna

5 Jan 1941 Brasileiro de Seleções	São Paulo (São Paulo (state))	7–0	Pernambuco	São Paulo
	Servílio 24', 35', 71'; Carvalho Leite 30', 56', 59'; Remo 60'			Stadium: Estádio do Pacaembu; Referee: José Ferreira Lemos

11 Jan 1941 Brasileiro de Seleções	São Paulo (São Paulo (state))	3–1	Rio de Janeiro	São Paulo
	Carvalho Leite 33'; Lima 38'; Luisinho 53'		Adílson 72'	Stadium: Estádio do Pacaembu; Referee: Mariano Carneiro

15 Jan 1941 Brasileiro de Seleções	Rio de Janeiro	4–0	(São Paulo (state)) São Paulo	Rio de Janeiro
	Leônidas 3', 59'; Zizinho 31'; Afonsinho 43'			Stadium: Estádio das Laranjeiras; Referee: Mario Vianna

20 Jan 1941 Brasileiro de Seleções	São Paulo (São Paulo (state))	2–2	Rio de Janeiro	São Paulo
	Luisinho 41', 66'		Zizinho 4'; Adílson 39'	Stadium: Estádio do Pacaembu; Referee: Mario Vianna

28 May 1941 Friendly	Rio de Janeiro	6–5	(São Paulo (state)) São Paulo	Rio de Janeiro
	Amorim 6', 36'; Alberto 17' (o.g.); Hércules 22'; Pirillo 55', 58'		Capelozi 51', 83'; Cláudio 62'; Teixeirinha 64'; Echevarrieta 76'	Stadium: Estádio das Laranjeiras; Referee: Mario Vianna

4 Jun 1941 Friendly	São Paulo (São Paulo (state))	3–0	Rio de Janeiro	São Paulo
	Capelozi 16'; Teixeirinha 77'; Lima 86'			Stadium: Estádio do Pacaembu; Referee: José Alexandrino

3 Dec 1941 Brasileiro de Seleções	São Paulo (São Paulo (state))	7–2	Rio Grande do Sul	São Paulo
	Cláudio 14'; Lima 18'; Servílio 47'; Milani 68', 83', 85'; Pipi 88'		Carlitos 8'; Massinha 30'	Stadium: Estádio do Pacaembu; Referee: Heitor Marcelino Domingues

6 Dec 1941 Brasileiro de Seleções	São Paulo (São Paulo (state))	4–1	Rio Grande do Sul	São Paulo
	Servílio 4', 40'; Milani 57', 81'		Massinha 80'	Stadium: Estádio do Pacaembu; Referee: Heitor Marcelino Domingues

10 Dec 1941 Brasileiro de Seleções	São Paulo (São Paulo (state))	4–2	Rio de Janeiro	São Paulo
	Cláudio 7'; Pipi 12', 30'; Milani 85'		Pirillo 59'; Geninho 87'	Stadium: Estádio do Pacaembu; Referee: Heitor Marcelino Domingues

14 Dec 1941 Brasileiro de Seleções	Rio de Janeiro	4–3	(São Paulo (state)) São Paulo	Rio de Janeiro
	Pirillo 12', 40'; Tim 60'; Lelé 67'		Servílio 16'; Milani 28', 54' (pen.)	Stadium: São Januário; Referee: Mario Vianna

17 Dec 1941 Brasileiro de Seleções	Rio de Janeiro	0–1	(São Paulo (state)) São Paulo	Rio de Janeiro
			Lima 48'	Stadium: São Januário; Referee: Mario Vianna

25 Oct 1942 Friendly	São Paulo (São Paulo (state))	4–1	Foreign XI	São Paulo
	Leônidas 33', 58'; Waldemar de Brito 78'; Jerônimo 88'		Villadóniga 24'	Stadium: Estádio do Pacaembu; Referee: Jorge Gomes

29 Nov 1942 Brasileiro de Seleções	São Paulo (São Paulo (state))	3–1	Minas Gerais	São Paulo
	Milani 7', 88'; Pardal 62'		Tião 33'	Stadium: Estádio do Pacaembu; Referee: José Pereira Peixoto

2 Dec 1942 Brasileiro de Seleções	São Paulo (São Paulo (state))	8–1	Minas Gerais	São Paulo
	Pardal 9', 90'; Servílio 14', 58'; Milani 44', 49', 67', 72'		Alcides 17'	Stadium: Estádio do Pacaembu; Referee: Mário Vianna

5 Dec 1942 Brasileiro de Seleções	São Paulo (São Paulo (state))	3–1	Rio de Janeiro	São Paulo
	Milani 5' (pen.), 75' (pen.); Servílio 17'		Amorim 88' (pen.)	Stadium: Estádio do Pacaembu; Referee: Pausanias Pinto da Rocha

10 Dec 1942 Brasileiro de Seleções	Rio de Janeiro	1–0	(São Paulo (state)) São Paulo	Rio de Janeiro
	Zizinho 80'			Stadium: São Januário; Referee: Mario Vianna

15 Dec 1942 Brasileiro de Seleções	São Paulo (São Paulo (state))	3–3	Rio de Janeiro	São Paulo
	Milani 43', 44'; Servílio 68'		Pirillo 28'; Lelé 50'; Zarzur 89'	Stadium: Estádio do Pacaembu; Referee: Francisco Trindade

20 Dec 1942 Brasileiro de Seleções	Rio de Janeiro	3–4	(São Paulo (state)) São Paulo	Rio de Janeiro
	Vevé 22', 65'; Amorim 28'		Milani 9'; Lima 71', 84'; Cláudio 76'	Stadium: São Januário; Referee: Francisco Trindade

5 Dec 1943 Brasileiro de Seleções	São Paulo (São Paulo (state))	5–3	Rio Grande do Sul	São Paulo
	Hércules 2'; Servílio 15'; Zezé Procópio 28'; Luisinho 61'; Brandão 71'		Carlitos 24', 60'; Tesourinha 52'	Stadium: Estádio do Pacaembu; Referee: José Alexandrino

8 Dec 1943 Brasileiro de Seleções	São Paulo (São Paulo (state))	5–0	Rio Grande do Sul	São Paulo
	Hércules 3', 22', 80'; Brandão 14'; Leônidas 36'			Stadium: Estádio do Pacaembu; Referee: Mario Vianna

12 Dec 1943 Brasileiro de Seleções	São Paulo (São Paulo (state))	3–1	Rio de Janeiro	São Paulo
	Leônidas 26'; Luisinho 32', 88'		Pirillo 19' (pen.)	Stadium: Estádio do Pacaembu; Referee: Genaro Cirilo (URU)

15 Dec 1943 Brasileiro de Seleções	São Paulo (São Paulo (state))	3–2	Rio de Janeiro	São Paulo
	Servílio 11'; Hércules 35'; Luisinho 88'		Tim 5'; Ademir 8'	Stadium: Estádio do Pacaembu; Referee: Aníbal Tejada (URU)

19 Dec 1943 Brasileiro de Seleções	Rio de Janeiro	3–0	(São Paulo (state)) São Paulo	Rio de Janeiro
	Lelé 6', 67'; Pinto 16'			Stadium: São Januário; Referee: Genaro Cirilo (URU)

23 Dec 1943 Brasileiro de Seleções	Rio de Janeiro	6–1	(São Paulo (state)) São Paulo	Rio de Janeiro
	Vevé 25'; Pinto 40', 62', 81', 83'; Lelé 64' (pen.)		Leônidas 49'	Stadium: São Januário; Referee: Aníbal Tejada (URU)

30 Dec 1943 Brasileiro de Seleções	Rio de Janeiro	2–1	(São Paulo (state)) São Paulo	Rio de Janeiro
	Vevé 31'; Pinto 32'		Leônidas 86'	Stadium: São Januário; Referee: Genaro Cirilo (URU)

19 Nov 1944 Brasileiro de Seleções	Rio Grande do Sul	2–1	(São Paulo (state)) São Paulo	Rio de Janeiro
	Adãozinho 4', 40'		Pardal 88'	Stadium: Estádio das Laranjeiras; Referee: Mario Vianna

26 Nov 1944 Brasileiro de Seleções	São Paulo (São Paulo (state))	8–0 (a.e.t.)	Rio Grande do Sul	São Paulo
	Servílio 4', 53' (pen.); Lima 35'; Luisinho 14', 101'; Remo 76'; Leônidas 97', 104'			Stadium: Estádio do Pacaembu; Referee: Mario Vianna

3 Dec 1944 Brasileiro de Seleções	Rio de Janeiro	1–1	(São Paulo (state)) São Paulo	Rio de Janeiro
	Djalma 38'		Zezé Procópio 44'	Stadium: São Januário; Referee: João Etzel Filho

6 Dec 1944 Brasileiro de Seleções	Rio de Janeiro	3–1	(São Paulo (state)) São Paulo	Rio de Janeiro
	Heleno de Freitas 32', 82'; Jair 76'		Cláudio 21'	Stadium: São Januário; Referee: Sílvio Stucchi

10 Dec 1944 Brasileiro de Seleções	São Paulo (São Paulo (state))	2–1	Rio de Janeiro	São Paulo
	Servílio 3'; Noronha 84'		Jorginho 18'	Stadium: Estádio do Pacaembu; Referee: Oscar Pereira Gomes

14 Dec 1944 Brasileiro de Seleções	São Paulo (São Paulo (state))	4–3	Rio de Janeiro	São Paulo
	Leônidas 1'; Luisinho 27', 30', 33'		Ademir 42', 56'; Heleno de Freitas 73'	Stadium: Estádio do Pacaembu; Referee: Oscar Pereira Gomes

17 Dec 1944 Brasileiro de Seleções	Rio de Janeiro	3–1	(São Paulo (state)) São Paulo	Rio de Janeiro
	Amorim 11'; Jorginho 30'; Ademir 65'		Leônidas 74'	Stadium: São Januário; Referee: José Alexandrino

17 Mar 1946 Friendly	Socorrense (Brazil)	2–4	(São Paulo (state)) São Paulo	Socorro
	Otávio; Boneca		Leonaldo; Romeuzinho; Zé Maria; Mario Miranda	Referee: Amaral Sobrinho

24 Mar 1946 Friendly	Noroeste (Brazil)	1–3	(São Paulo (state)) São Paulo	Bauru
	Pedrinho		Américo; Rolim; Ministro	Referee: Elpídio Fida

1 Dec 1946 Brasileiro de Seleções	São Paulo (São Paulo (state))	5–0	Rio Grande do Sul	São Paulo
	Teixeirinha 5'; Lima 18', 27'; Nininho 68'; Pinga 86'			Stadium: Estádio do Pacaembu; Referee: Mario Vianna

8 Dec 1946 Brasileiro de Seleções	Rio Grande do Sul	5–5 (a.e.t.)	(São Paulo (state)) São Paulo	Rio de Janeiro
	Adãozinho 16', 88'; Tesourinha 20'; Hugo 23', 56'		Cláudio 33'; Pinga 44'; Noronha 58'; Teixeirinha 75', 113'	Stadium: São Januário; Referee: Mario Vianna

8 Mar 1947 Brasileiro de Seleções	São Paulo (São Paulo (state))	5–2	Rio de Janeiro	São Paulo
	Servílio 31', 38', 83'; Cláudio 57', 59'		Heleno de Freitas 35'; Ademir 76'	Stadium: Estádio do Pacaembu; Referee: João Etzel Filho

12 Mar 1947 Brasileiro de Seleções	Rio de Janeiro	3–2	(São Paulo (state)) São Paulo	Rio de Janeiro
	Ademir 1'; Maneca 38', 55'		Teixeirinha 10'; Lima 12'	Stadium: São Januário; Referee: Mario Vianna

16 Mar 1947 Brasileiro de Seleções	Rio de Janeiro	4–1	(São Paulo (state)) São Paulo	Rio de Janeiro
	Chico 38'; Maneca 53', 66', 78'		Servílio 6'	Stadium: São Januário; Referee: João Etzel Filho

19 Jun 1949 Friendly	São Paulo (São Paulo (state))	4–0	(Brazil) AAPESP	São Paulo
	Friaça 33', 40'; Ponce de León 66'; Fiume 80'			Stadium: Estádio do Pacaembu; Referee: Godfrey Sunderland (ENG)

8 Mar 1950 Brasileiro de Seleções	Rio Grande do Sul	1–1	(São Paulo (state)) São Paulo	Porto Alegre
	Hermes 24'		Baltazar 41'	Stadium: Estádio dos Eucaliptos; Referee: Alberto da Gama Malcher

12 Mar 1950 Brasileiro de Seleções	São Paulo (São Paulo (state))	6–1	Rio Grande do Sul	São Paulo
	Pinga 2', 51'; Baltazar 20', 54'; Teixeirinha 80'; Cláudio 80'		Hermes 59'	Stadium: Estádio do Pacaembu; Referee: Alberto da Gama Malcher

16 Mar 1950 Brasileiro de Seleções	Rio de Janeiro	4–0	(São Paulo (state)) São Paulo	Rio de Janeiro
	Zizinho 1', 49'; Ipojucan 8', 24'			Stadium: São Januário; Referee: Mario Vianna

19 Mar 1950 Brasileiro de Seleções	São Paulo (São Paulo (state))	2–2	Rio de Janeiro	São Paulo
	Cláudio 13'; Baltazar 38'		Zizinho 25'; Chico 50'	Stadium: Estádio do Pacaembu; Referee: Harry Rowley

22 Mar 1950 Brasileiro de Seleções	São Paulo (São Paulo (state))	1–1	Rio de Janeiro	São Paulo
	Baltazar 19'		Nílton Santos 20'	Stadium: Estádio do Pacaembu; Referee: Cyril Barrick

11 Jun 1950 International	Brazil	4–3	(São Paulo (state)) São Paulo	Rio de Janeiro
	Baltazar 29'; Rodrigues 55', 70'; Ademir 81'		Augusto 18'; Brandãozinho 76'; Ponce de León 85'	Stadium: São Januário; Referee: Mário Oliveira (POR)

17 Jun 1950 Friendly	Rio de Janeiro	1–3	(São Paulo (state)) São Paulo	Rio de Janeiro
	Didi 10'		Augusto 16', 89'; Ponce de León 85'	Stadium: Estádio do Maracanã; Referee: Alberto da Gama Malcher
