= 1942 Campeonato Paulista =

Campeonato Paulista
- Season: 1942
- Champions: Palmeiras
- Matches played: 110
- Goals scored: 571 (5.19 per match)
- Top goalscorer: Milani (Corinthians) – 24 goals
- Biggest home win: Santos 10–2 Comercial (June 7, 1942)
- Biggest away win: Hespanha 0–8 Corinthians (May 31, 1942); São Paulo Railway 1–9 Corinthians (September 12, 1942)
- Highest scoring: Santos 10–2 Comercial (June 7, 1942)

The 1942 Campeonato Paulista da Primeira Divisão, organized by the Federação Paulista de Futebol, was the 41st season of São Paulo's top professional football league. Palmeiras won the title for the 9th time, its first title under its new name. No teams were relegated. The top scorer was Corinthians's Milani with 24 goals.

== Championship ==
The championship was disputed in a double-round robin system, with the team with the most points winning the title.

Pos	Team	Pld	W	D	L	GF	GA	GD	Pts	Qualification or relegation
1	Palestra de São Paulo	20	17	2	1	65	19	+46	36 (Note: Palestra Itália changed its name to Palestra de São Paulo shortly before the start of the championship, and later changed its name again to Palmeiras in September 14.)	Champions
2	Corinthians	20	15	3	2	78	29	+49	33	
3	São Paulo	20	15	2	3	77	28	+49	32	
4	Ypiranga	20	10	4	6	55	44	+11	24	
5	Juventus	20	9	1	10	42	46	−4	19	
6	São Paulo Railway	20	8	3	9	48	61	−13	19	
7	Santos	20	7	4	9	59	51	+8	18	
8	Portuguesa	20	8	2	10	44	52	−8	18	
9	Portuguesa Santista	20	5	0	15	39	60	−21	10	
10	Comercial	20	3	1	16	34	94	−60	7	
11	Hespanha	20	1	2	17	30	87	−57	4	

Updated to match(es) played on October 4, 1942. Source: RSSSF.com
Rules for classification: 1) points; 2) goal difference; 3) wins; 4) head-to-head points.

== Top Scorers ==
Rank	Player	Club	Goals
1	Mário Milani	Corinthians	24
2	Waldemar de Brito	São Paulo	22
3	Pardal	São Paulo	16
4	Lima	Palestra	15
4	Gradim	Santos	15
4	Guanabara	Portuguesa	15
7	Luisinho	São Paulo	14
8	Leônidas	São Paulo	13
9	Cabeção	Palestra	12
9	Ruy	Santos	12
9	Servílio	Corinthians	12
12	Jerônimo	Corinthians	11
13	Hércules	Corinthians	10
