= 1944 Campeonato Paulista =

Campeonato Paulista
- Season: 1944
- Champions: Palmeiras
- Matches played: 110
- Goals scored: 471 (4.28 per match)
- Top goalscorer: Luizinho (São Paulo) – 22 goals
- Biggest home win: São Paulo 9–1 Santos (June 18, 1944)
- Biggest away win: São Paulo Railway 2–8 São Paulo (April 1, 1944)
- Highest scoring: Portuguesa Santista 4–7 São Paulo (May 28, 1944)

The 1944 Campeonato Paulista da Primeira Divisão, organized by the Federação Paulista de Futebol, was the 43rd season of São Paulo's top professional football league. Palmeiras won the title for the 10th time. No teams were relegated. Luizinho from São Paulo was the top scorer with 22 goals.

== Championship ==
The championship was disputed in a double-round robin system, with the team with the most points winning the title.

Pos	Team	Pld	W	D	L	GF	GA	GD	Pts	Qualification or relegation
1	Palmeiras	20	15	2	3	50	19	+31	32	Champions
2	São Paulo	20	13	3	4	69	32	+37	29	
3	Corinthians	20	12	4	4	55	35	+20	28	
4	Ypiranga	20	10	3	7	37	29	+8	23	
5	São Paulo Railway	20	9	3	8	41	48	−7	21	
6	Santos	20	8	4	8	39	41	−2	20	
7	Juventus	20	7	4	9	39	49	−10	18	
8	Comercial	20	8	2	10	37	57	−20	18	
9	Portuguesa	20	3	6	11	29	47	−18	12	
10	Jabaquara	20	5	0	15	38	50	−12	10	
11	Portuguesa Santista	20	3	3	14	37	69	−32	9	

Updated to match(es) played on October 15, 1944. Source: RSSSF.com
Rules for classification: 1) points; 2) goal difference; 3) wins; 4) head-to-head points.

== Top Scores ==
Rank	Player	Club	Goals
1	Luisinho	São Paulo	22
2	Pardal	São Paulo	18
3	Caxambu	Palmeiras	12
4	Alfredo González	Palmeiras	11
4	Hércules	Corinthians	11
6	Teleco	Santos	10
6	Antonio Sastre	São Paulo	10
6	Rodrigues	Ypiranga	10
9	Servílio	Corinthians	9
