= 1931 in Brazilian football =

Football in Brazil
- Season: 1931

The following article presents a summary of the 1931 football (soccer) season in Brazil, which was the 30th season of competitive football in the country.

== Campeonato Paulista ==
Final Standings

Position	Team	Points	Played	Won	Drawn	Lost	For	Against	Difference
1	São Paulo da Floresta	45	26	20	5	1	92	30	62
2	Palestra Itália-SP	43	26	21	1	4	84	35	49
3	Santos	42	25	18	6	1	79	28	51
4	Atlético Santista	33	25	13	7	5	66	44	22
5	Portuguesa	32	26	14	4	8	55	35	20
6	Corinthians	30	26	11	8	7	66	47	19
7	Guarani	26	26	11	4	11	54	49	5
8	Juventus	23	26	10	3	13	47	64	-17
9	Sírio	22	26	10	2	14	60	56	4
10	SC Internacional de São Paulo	19	26	7	5	14	35	51	-16
11	AA São Bento	14	26	4	6	16	45	74	-29
12	CS América	12	26	5	2	19	32	95	-63
13	Ypiranga-SP	11	26	4	3	19	31	82	-51
14	Germânia	10	26	4	2	20	35	91	-56

São Paulo da Floresta declared as the Campeonato Paulista champions.

== State championship champions ==
State	Champion	State	Champion
Acre	-	Paraíba	Cabo Branco
Alagoas	not disputed	Paraná	Coritiba
Amapá	-	Pernambuco	Santa Cruz
Amazonas	Rio Negro	Piauí	-
Bahia	Bahia	Rio de Janeiro	Ypiranga
Ceará	Ceará	Rio de Janeiro (DF)	America-RJ
Espírito Santo	Santo Antônio	Rio Grande do Norte	América-RN
Goiás	-	Rio Grande do Sul	Grêmio
Maranhão	Sírio-MA	Rondônia	-
Mato Grosso	-	Santa Catarina	Lauro Müller
Minas Gerais	Atlético Mineiro	São Paulo	São Paulo da Floresta
Pará	Paysandu	Sergipe	not disputed

== Other competition champions ==
Competition	Champion
Campeonato Brasileiro de Seleções Estaduais	Rio de Janeiro (DF)

== Brazil national team ==
The following table lists all the games played by the Brazil national football team in official competitions and friendly matches during 1931.

Date	Opposition	Result	Score	Brazil scorers	Competition
July 2, 1931	(Hungary) Ferencváros	W	6-1	Petronilho (2), Nico (2), Del Debbio, De Maria	International Friendly (unofficial match)
September 6, 1931	Uruguay	W	2-0	Nilo (2)	Copa Rio Branco
