= 1930 Campeonato Paulista =

Campeonato Paulista
- Season: 1930
- Champions: Corinthians
- Matches played: 182
- Goals scored: 808 (4.44 per match)
- Top goalscorer: Feitiço (Santos) – 37 goals
- Biggest home win: Guarani 10–1 Ypiranga (June 8, 1930)
- Biggest away win: São Bento 0-9 Palestra Itália (November 23, 1930)
- Highest scoring: Palestra Itália 9–5 Ypiranga (December 7, 1930)

The 1930 Campeonato Paulista, organized by the APEA (Associação Paulista de Esportes Atléticos), was the 29th season of São Paulo's top association football league. Corinthians won the title for the 8th time. No teams were relegated and the top scorer was Feitiço, from Santos, with 37 goals.

== System ==
The championship was organised in a double-round robin system, with the team with the most points winning the title.

== Championship ==
Pos	Team	Pld	W	D	L	GF	GA	GD	Pts	Qualification or relegation
1	Corinthians	26	20	4	2	94	33	+61	44	Champions
2	São Paulo	26	15	10	1	74	27	+47	40	
3	Palestra Itália	26	17	6	3	85	27	+58	40	
4	Santos	26	18	4	4	80	38	+42	40	
5	Portuguesa	26	13	4	9	67	56	+11	30	
6	Guarani	26	13	3	10	66	52	+14	29	
7	Internacional	26	10	5	11	45	43	+2	25	
8	Atlético Santista	26	9	4	13	53	65	−12	22	
9	Juventus	26	10	1	15	39	61	−22	21	
10	Sírio	26	9	3	14	65	60	+5	21	
11	América	26	7	2	17	33	73	−40	16	
12	Ypiranga	26	4	3	19	29	100	−71	11	
13	Germânia	26	5	1	20	44	79	−35	11	
14	São Bento	26	4	3	19	34	94	−60	11	

Updated to match(es) played on January 4, 1931. Source: RSSSF.com
Rules for classification: 1) points; 2) goal difference; 3) wins; 4) head-to-head points.

== Top Scores 1930 ==
Rank	Player	Club	Goals
1	Feitiço	Santos	37
2	Arthur Friedenreich	São Paulo	26
3	Heitor	Palestra Itália	22
4	Gambinha	Corinthians	21
5	Lolico	Guarani	18
5	De Maria	Corinthians	18
7	Salles	Portuguesa	17
7	Camarão	Santos	17
9	Filó	Corinthians	14
10	Osses	Palestra Itália	13
