= 1945 Campeonato Paulista =

Campeonato Paulista
- Season: 1945
- Champions: São Paulo
- Matches played: 110
- Goals scored: 462 (4.2 per match)
- Top goalscorer: Passarinho (São Paulo Railway); Servílio (Corinthians) – 17 goals
- Biggest home win: São Paulo 12-1 Jabaquara (July 8, 1945)
- Biggest away win: Juventus 0-4 Portuguesa (April 1, 1945); Jabaquara 2-6 São Paulo (April 8, 1945); Ypiranga 0-4 Corinthians (May 12, 1945); Ypiranga 0-4 Portuguesa (September 9, 1945); Santos 2-6 Jabaquara (September 23, 1945); Portuguesa Santista 1-5 São Paulo (September 30, 1945)
- Highest scoring: São Paulo 12-1 Jabaquara (July 8, 1945)

The 1945 Campeonato Paulista da Primeira Divisão, organized by the Federação Paulista de Futebol, was the 44th season of São Paulo's top professional football league. São Paulo won the title for the 3rd time. No teams were relegated. The top scorers were Corinthians's Servílio and São Paulo Railway's Passarinho, each with 17 goals.

== Championship ==
The championship was disputed in a double-round robin system, with the team with the most points winning the title.

Pos	Team	Pld	W	D	L	GF	GA	GD	Pts	Qualification or relegation
1	São Paulo	20	17	2	1	70	20	+50	36	Champions
2	Corinthians	20	14	3	3	56	24	+32	31	
3	Palmeiras	20	11	7	2	47	17	+30	29	
4	Portuguesa	20	10	5	5	44	22	+22	25	
5	Jabaquara	20	9	2	9	48	65	−17	20	
6	Santos	20	8	2	10	34	46	−12	18	
7	Ypiranga	20	8	1	11	37	44	−7	17	
8	São Paulo Railway	20	6	2	12	37	52	−15	14	
9	Juventus	20	5	2	13	34	45	−11	12	
10	Comercial	20	4	3	13	32	60	−28	11	
11	Portuguesa Santista	20	2	3	15	23	69	−46	7	

Updated to match(es) played on October 7, 1945. Source: RSSSF.com
Rules for classification: 1) points; 2) goal difference; 3) wins; 4) head-to-head points.

== Top Scores ==
Rank	Player	Club	Goals
1	Passarinho	São Paulo Railway	17
1	Servílio	Corinthians	17
2	Leônidas	São Paulo	16
3	Mário Milani	Corinthians	14
4	Teixeirinha	São Paulo	13
4	Baltazar	Jabaquara	13
6	Luisinho	São Paulo	9
6	Pinga	Portuguesa	9
6	Oswaldinho	Palmeiras	9
6	Lima	Palmeiras	9
10	Jorginho	Santos	8
10	Nininho	Portuguesa	8
