= Feitiço =

Feitiço may refer to:

- Feitiço - Portuguese word for Fetishism
- Feitiço - Footballer
