= 1963 Pan American Games =

4th edition of the Pan American Games

IV Pan American Games
- Poster of the 1963 Pan American Games.
- Host: São Paulo, Brazil
- Nations: 22
- Athletes: 1,665
- Events: 160 in 19 sports
- Opening: April 20
- Closing: May 5
- Opened by: Governor Adhemar de Barros
- Cauldron lighter: José Telles da Conceição
- Main venue: Pacaembu Stadium

The 1963 Pan American Games, officially known as the IV Pan American Games (Portuguese: IV Jogos Pan-Americanos) and commonly known as São Paulo 1963, were held from April 20 to May 5, 1963, in São Paulo, Brazil.

The organization of the Pan American Games was led by Major Sylvio de Magalhães Padilha, a distinguished Olympic athlete who also served as President of the Brazilian Olympic Committee, Vice President of PanAm Sports (Panamerican Sports Organization), and Vice President of the International Olympic Committee.

== Host city selection ==
For the first time, two cities submitted bids to host the 1963 Pan American Games that were recognized by the Pan American Sports Organization (PASO). On August 25, 1959, São Paulo was selected over Winnipeg to host the IV Pan American Games by the PASO at the VII Pan American Sports Congress in Chicago, United States.

== Medal count ==
* Host nation (Brazil)

Rank	Nation	Gold	Silver	Bronze	Total
1	United States	106	56	37	199
2	Brazil*	14	21	18	53
3	Canada	11	27	26	64
4	Argentina	8	15	16	39
5	Cuba	4	6	4	14
Totals (5 entries)		143	125	101	369

== Participating nations ==
According to the Brazilian Olympic Committee, twenty-two nations sent competitors to São Paulo, but only twenty-one were listed. Barbados took part in the Pan American Games for the first time. Costa Rica, Haiti, Nicaragua and the Dominican Republic competed in 1959 but did not participate in the 1963 Games.

- Argentina
- Bahamas
- Barbados
- Brazil
- Guyana
- Canada
- Chile
- Cuba
- Ecuador
- El Salvador
- Guatemala
- Jamaica
- Mexico
- Netherlands Antilles
- Panama
- Peru
- Puerto Rico
- Trinidad and Tobago
- United States
- Uruguay
- Venezuela

== Sports ==
- Aquatics
  - Diving
  - Swimming
  - Synchronized swimming
- Athletics
- Baseball
- Basketball
- Boxing
- Cycling
- Equestrian
- Fencing
- Football
- Gymnastics
- Judo
- Modern pentathlon
- Rowing
- Sailing
- Shooting
- Tennis
- Volleyball
- Water polo
- Weightlifting
- Wrestling

== Venues ==
The games used 11 different venues:

- Pacaembu Stadium - athletics and opening and closing ceremonies
- Parque São Jorge and Estádio Nicolau Alayon - football (soccer)
- Ibirapuera Gymnasium - basketball
- Palestra Itália Stadium - volleyball
- Ibirapuera Park - cycling
- Estádio do Bom Retiro - baseball
- Esporte Clube Pinheiros - diving, swimming, water polo
- Pinheiros Tênis Clube - tennis
- Sociedade Hipica de São Paulo - equestrian
- Reservoir of Guarapiranga - sailing
- Raia Olímpica da USP - rowing

Preceded by Chicago	IV Pan American Games; São Paulo (1963)	Succeeded by Winnipeg
