= 1932 Campeonato Paulista =

Campeonato Paulista
- Season: 1932
- Champions: Palestra Itália
- Matches played: 66
- Goals scored: 319 (4.83 per match)
- Top goalscorer: Romeu (Palestra Itália) – 18 goals
- Biggest home win: São Paulo 11–0 Internacional (July 3, 1932)
- Biggest away win: Atlético Santista 1-4 Juventus (May 15, 1932); Internacional 0–3 Santos (June 16, 1932); Portuguesa 0-3 Palestra Itália (November 20, 1932); São Bento 3-6 Atlético Santista (December 18, 1932)
- Highest scoring: São Paulo 11–0 Internacional (July 3, 1932)

The 1932 Campeonato Paulista, organized by the APEA (Associação Paulista de Esportes Atléticos), was the 31st season of São Paulo's top association football league. Palestra Itália won the title for the 4th time. No teams were relegated. The top scorer was Palestra Itália's Romeu, with 18 goals.

== System ==
The championship was disputed in a single-round robin system, with the team with the most points winning the title. Originally two rounds would be held, but the championship was interrupted in early July due to the outbreak of the Constitutionalist Revolution. It only resumed in mid-November, leaving no dates left within the year for a second round.

== Championship ==
| Pos | Team | Pld | W | D | L | GF | GA | GD | Pts | Qualification or relegation |
|---|---|---|---|---|---|---|---|---|---|---|
| 1 | Palestra Itália | 11 | 11 | 0 | 0 | 49 | 8 | +41 | 22 | Champions |
| 2 | São Paulo | 11 | 8 | 1 | 2 | 34 | 12 | +22 | 17 | |
| 3 | Juventus | 11 | 8 | 0 | 3 | 31 | 18 | +13 | 16 | |
| 4 | Germânia | 11 | 4 | 3 | 4 | 25 | 32 | −7 | 11 | |
| 5 | Ypiranga | 11 | 4 | 2 | 5 | 27 | 22 | +5 | 10 | |
| 6 | Corinthians | 11 | 5 | 0 | 6 | 29 | 28 | +1 | 10 | |
| 7 | Portuguesa | 11 | 4 | 2 | 5 | 22 | 24 | −2 | 10 | |
| 8 | Santos | 11 | 5 | 0 | 6 | 26 | 31 | −5 | 10 | |
| 9 | São Bento | 11 | 3 | 3 | 5 | 22 | 27 | −5 | 9 | |
| 10 | Atlético Santista | 11 | 3 | 2 | 6 | 22 | 39 | −17 | 8 | |
| 11 | Sírio | 11 | 4 | 0 | 7 | 19 | 28 | −9 | 8 | |
| 12 | Internacional | 11 | 0 | 1 | 10 | 13 | 50 | −37 | 1 | |

Updated to match(es) played on December 18, 1932. Source: RSSSF.com
Rules for classification: 1) points; 2) goal difference; 3) wins; 4) head-to-head points.

== Top Scores ==
| Rank | Player | Club | Goals |
|---|---|---|---|
| | Romeu Pellicciari | Palestra Itália | 18 |
| | Luisinho | São Paulo | 15 |
| | Araken | São Paulo | 11 |
| | Gambinha | Corinthians | 7 |
