= Remo Januzzi =

Brazilian footballer (1917–1984)

Remo
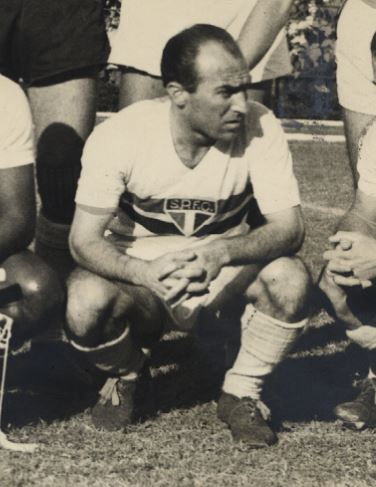

Personal information
- Full name: Remo Januzzi
- Date of birth: 14 January 1917
- Place of birth: Visconde do Rio Branco, Brazil
- Date of death: 28 September 1984 (aged 67)
- Place of death: Santos, Brazil
- Position: Attacking midfielder

Senior career*
| Years | Team | Apps | (Gls) |
| 1938–1939 | Santos | | |
| 1940–1951 | São Paulo | 348 | (107) |

Managerial career
- 1960: São Paulo (caretaker)
- * Club domestic league appearances and goals as of 6 March 2022

Remo Januzzi (14 January 1917 – 28 September 1984) was a Brazilian professional footballer who has played for São Paulo FC as a midfielder, and scored 107 goals in 348 matches. In 1960, Januzzi also managed São Paulo as a caretaker for 14 opportunities.

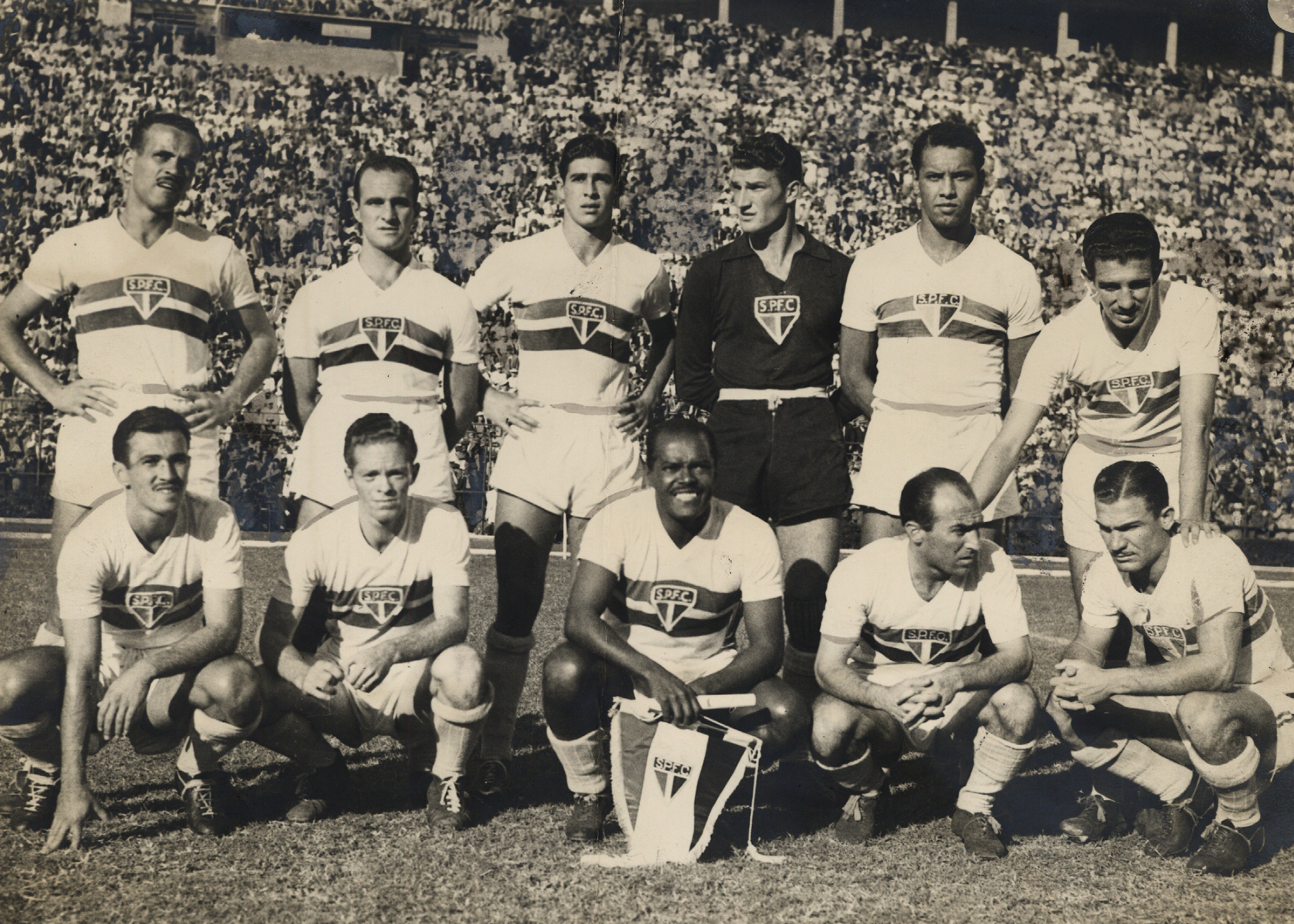
1949 São Paulo FC squad - Remo is the fourth of crouching line (from left to right), next to Leônidas

== Honours ==
São Paulo

- Campeonato Paulista:
  - Champions (5): 1943, 1945, 1946, 1948, 1949
- Taça Cidade de São Paulo:
  - Champions: 1944
