= 1944 in Brazilian football =

Football in Brazil
- Season: 1944

The following article presents a summary of the 1944 football (soccer) season in Brazil, which was the 43rd season of competitive football in the country.

== Campeonato Paulista ==
Final Standings

Position	Team	Points	Played	Won	Drawn	Lost	For	Against	Difference
1	Palmeiras	32	20	15	2	3	50	19	31
2	São Paulo	29	20	13	3	4	69	32	37
3	Corinthians	28	20	12	4	4	55	35	20
4	Ypiranga-SP	23	20	10	3	7	37	29	8
5	São Paulo Railway	21	20	9	3	8	41	48	-7
6	Santos	20	20	8	4	8	39	41	-2
7	Juventus	18	20	7	4	9	39	49	-10
8	Comercial-SP	18	20	8	2	10	37	57	-15
9	Portuguesa	12	20	3	6	11	29	47	-18
10	Jabaquara	10	20	5	0	15	38	50	-12
11	Portuguesa Santista	9	20	3	3	14	37	69	-32

Palmeiras declared as the Campeonato Paulista champions.

== State championship champions ==
State	Champion	State	Champion
Acre	-	Paraíba	Botafogo-PB
Alagoas	CSA	Paraná	Ferroviário-PR
Amapá	Macapá	Pernambuco	América-PE
Amazonas	Olímpico-AM	Piauí	Flamengo-PI
Bahia	Bahia	Rio de Janeiro	Petropolitano
Ceará	Maguari	Rio de Janeiro (DF)	Flamengo
Espírito Santo	Caixas-ES	Rio Grande do Norte	ABC
Goiás	Atlético Goianiense	Rio Grande do Sul	Internacional
Maranhão	Moto Club	Rondônia	-
Mato Grosso	Americano-MT	Santa Catarina	Avaí
Minas Gerais	Cruzeiro	São Paulo	Palmeiras
Pará	Paysandu	Sergipe	Vasco-SE

== Other competition champions ==
Competition	Champion
Campeonato Brasileiro de Seleções Estaduais	Rio de Janeiro (DF)

== Brazil national team ==
The following table lists all the games played by the Brazil national football team in official competitions and friendly matches during 1944.

Date	Opposition	Result	Score	Brazil scorers	Competition
May 14, 1944	Uruguay	W	6-1	Isaías Benedito da Silva, Tesourinha, Eduardo Lima (2), Rui, Lelé	International Friendly
May 17, 1944	Uruguay	W	4-0	Jair da Rosa Pinto (3), Heleno de Freitas	International Friendly
