= Teixeirinha (footballer, born 1922) =

Brazilian footballer (1922–1999)

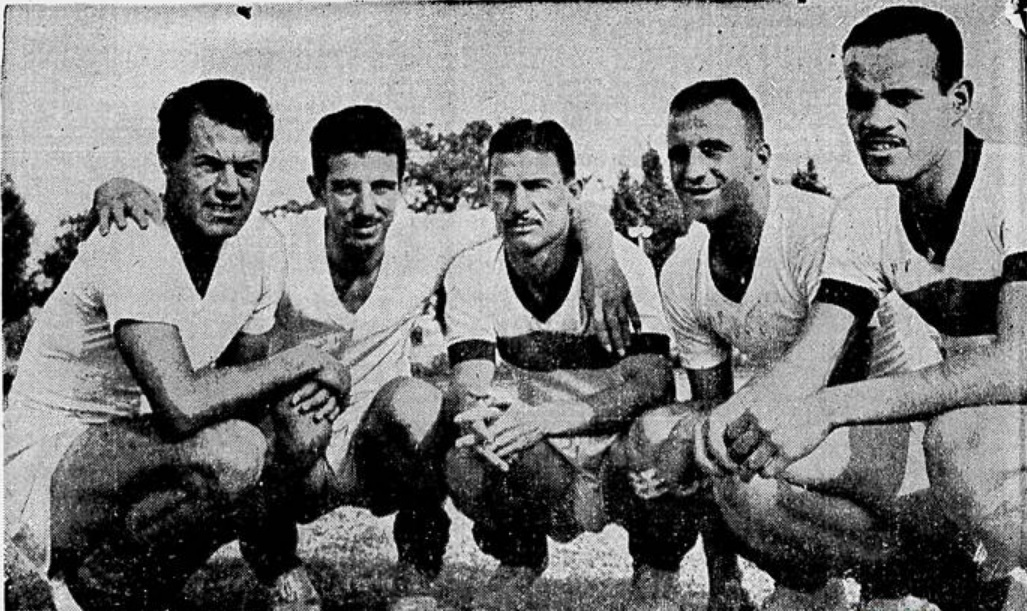
- São Paulo F.C. athletes Renganeschi, Noronha, Teixeirinha, Savério and Rui.

Personal information
- Full name: Elísio dos Santos Teixeira
- Date of birth: 4 March 1922
- Place of birth: São Paulo, Brazil
- Date of death: 17 August 1999 (aged 77)
- Place of death: São Paulo, Brazil
- Height: 1.76 m (5 ft 9 in)
- Position: Inside forward

Youth career
- 1938: São Paulo

Senior career*
Years	Team	Apps	(Gls)
1939–1956	São Paulo	525	(188)
- * Club domestic league appearances and goals

Elísio dos Santos Teixeira (4 March 1922 – 17 August 1999), was a Brazilian professional footballer who played for São Paulo FC as an inside forward. Teixeirinha won the Campeonato Paulista six times playing alongside great players like Leonidas and Sastre. He scored 188 goals in 525 games, which ranks him as the fourth-highest scorer in the history of São Paulo Futebol Clube. He was called to represent the Brazil national team at the 1946 South American Championship, though he did not enter in any matches.

== Honours ==
São Paulo

- Campeonato Paulista (6): 1943, 1945, 1946, 1948, 1949, 1953
- Taça Armando Arruda Pereira: 1952
- Small Club World Cup: 1955

== See also ==
- List of one-club men in association football
