= Luiz Imparato =

Brazilian footballer

Personal information
- Date of birth: 1 May 1910
- Place of birth: Votorantim, São Paulo, Brazil
- Date of death: 8 March 1976 (aged 65)
- Position: Forward

Senior career*
Years	Team	Apps	(Gls)
- Savóia
- São Bento
1932–1939	Palmeiras	113	(58)
Total		113	(58)
- * Club domestic league appearances and goals

Luiz Imparato (1 May 1910 – 8 March 1976) was a Brazilian footballer.

== Honours ==
Palmeiras

- Campeonato Paulista: 1932, 1933, 1934, 1936
- Torneio Rio-São Paulo: 1933
