= 1943 Campeonato Paulista =

Campeonato Paulista
- Season: 1943
- Champions: São Paulo
- Matches played: 110
- Goals scored: 498 (4.53 per match)
- Top goalscorer: Hércules (Corinthians) – 19 goals
- Biggest home win: Corinthians 9–0 Jabaquara (March 21, 1943); São Paulo 9–0 Portuguesa Santista (August 14, 1943)
- Biggest away win: Jabaquara 2–8 Corinthians (July 11, 1943); São Paulo Railway 2–8 Palmeiras (July 25, 1943)
- Highest scoring: Jabaquara 2–8 Corinthians (July 11, 1943); Ypiranga 7–3 Portuguesa Santista (July 18, 1943); São Paulo Railway 2–8 Palmeiras (July 25, 1943)

The 1943 Campeonato Paulista da Primeira Divisão, organized by the Federação Paulista de Futebol, was the 42nd season of São Paulo's top professional football league. São Paulo won the title for the 2nd time. No teams were relegated and the top scorer was Corinthians's Hércules with 19 goals.

== Championship ==
The championship was disputed in a double-round robin system, with the team with the most points winning the title.

Pos	Team	Pld	W	D	L	GF	GA	GD	Pts	Qualification or relegation
1	São Paulo	20	15	3	2	63	22	+41	33	Champions
2	Corinthians	20	15	2	3	71	28	+43	32	
3	Palmeiras	20	14	3	3	53	20	+33	31	
4	Juventus	20	9	5	6	49	31	+18	23	
5	Ypiranga	20	11	1	8	41	40	+1	23	
6	Santos	20	10	1	9	45	39	+6	21	
7	Portuguesa	20	9	3	8	39	34	+5	21	
8	Comercial	20	5	2	13	37	53	−16	12	
9	Portuguesa Santista	20	4	2	14	32	81	−49	10	
10	São Paulo Railway	20	4	1	15	38	77	−39	9	
11	Jabaquara	20	2	1	17	30	73	−43	5	

Updated to match(es) played on October 3, 1943. Source: RSSSF.com
Rules for classification: 1) points; 2) goal difference; 3) wins; 4) head-to-head points.

== Top Scores ==
Rank	Player	Club	Goals
1	Hércules	Corinthians	19
2	Mário Milani	Corinthians	17
3	Leônidas da Silva	São Paulo	15
4	Lima	Palmeiras	13
4	Ruy	Santos	13
4	Antonio Sastre	São Paulo	13
7	Luizinho	São Paulo	12
8	Caxambu	Palmeiras	10
8	Antoninho	Santos	10
8	Servílio	Corinthians	10
