= Carlitos (footballer, born 1921) =

Brazilian footballer

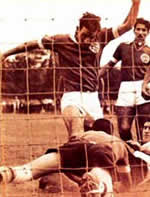
- Carlitos in 1940

Personal information
- Full name: Carlos Alberto Zolim Filho
- Date of birth: 27 November 1921
- Place of birth: Porto Alegre, Brazil
- Date of death: 30 October 2001 (aged 79)
- Place of death: Porto Alegre, Brazil
- Position: Forward

Senior career*
Years	Team	Apps	(Gls)
1938–1951	Internacional	165	(159)
- * Club domestic league appearances and goals

Carlos Alberto Zolim Filho, best known as Carlitos (27 November 1921 – 30 October 2001) was a Brazilian footballer who played as a forward.

== Achievements ==
With Tesourinha and Adãozinho formed most invaluable three striker attack of the 1940s, a team known as the "Road Roller". He played entire career (1938–1951) at Sport Club Internacional, and scored 485 goals. He is still to this date the top scorer in the club history. He won ten Campeonato Gaúcho, eight consecutive (1940–48, 1950 and 1951). He died at 79 years old.

== Career statistics ==
=== Club ===
Appearances and goals by club, season and competition
Club	Season	League		Régional		Other		Friendly		Total	
Club	Season	Apps	Goals	Apps	Goals	Apps	Goals	Apps	Goals	Apps	Goals
Internacional	1938	–		3	1	–		3	1	6	2
Internacional	1939	–		2	2	9	17	14	11	25	30
Internacional	1940	2	0	17	10	–		2	1	21	11
Internacional	1941	–		10	11	–		10	13	20	24
Internacional	1942	7	11	17	18	–		8	11	32	40
Internacional	1943	4	6	10	14	9	8	3	3	26	31
Internacional	1944	2	0	4	3	–		3	1	9	4
Internacional	1945	2	3	14	15	3	1	15	13	34	32
Internacional	1946	–		11	11	6	4	4	0	21	15
Internacional	1947	2	3	15	11	7	8	14	12	38	34
Internacional	1948	4	3	11	16	6	5	26	21	47	45
Internacional	1949	–		11	3	6	4	27	20	44	27
Internacional	1950	–		14	8	9	0	17	8	40	16
Internacional	1951	2	0	1	0	7	3	13	11	23	14
Career total		25	26	140	123	62	50	159	126	386	325

- a. Games in Torneio Relâmpago de Porto Alegre, Torneio Triangular de Porto Alegre & Torneio Extra de Porto Alegre

=== Seleção Gaúcho ===
Year	Games	Goals
1939	1	0
1941	5	4
1942	3	2
1943	8	10
1946	3	1
Total	20	17

	Date	Venue	Score	Opponent	Goal(s)	Compétition
1.	19 Novembre 1939	Estádio da Timbaúva, Porto Alegre	2–2	Paraná	0	Brasileirão de Seleções 1939
2.	9 Novembre 1941	Estádio da Montanha, Porto Alegre	6–4	Santa Catarina	2	Brasileirão de Seleções 1941
3.	27 Novembre 1941	Pacaembu, São Paulo	3–2	Pará	0	Brasileirão de Seleções 1941
4.	29 Novembre 1941	Pacaembu, São Paulo	5–4	Minas Gerais	1	Brasileirão de Seleções 1941
5.	3 December 1941	Pacaembu, São Paulo	2–7	São Paulo	1	Brasileirão de Seleções 1941
6.	6 December 1941	Pacaembu, São Paulo	1–4	São Paulo	0	Brasileirão de Seleções 1941
7.	18 Novembre 1942	Pacaembu, São Paulo	4–1	Mato Grosso	1	Brasileirão de Seleções 1942
8.	25 Novembre 1942	Estádio Manoel Schwartz, Rio de Janeiro	0–3	Rio de Janeiro	0	Brasileirão de Seleções 1942
9.	29 Novembre 1942	Estádio de General Severiano, Rio de Janeiro	1–6	Rio de Janeiro	1	Brasileirão de Seleções 1942
10.	31 October 1943		3–0	Santa Catarina	0	Brasileirão de Seleções 1943
11.	3 Novembre 1943		6–2	Santa Catarina	4	Brasileirão de Seleções 1943
12.	7 Novembre 1943	Montanha, Porto Alegre	2–1	Paraná	2	Brasileirão de Seleções 1943
13.	14 Novembre 1943		2–3	Paraná	1	Brasileirão de Seleções 1943
14.	21 Novembre 1943	Pacaembu, São Paulo	0–3	Bahia	0	Brasileirão de Seleções 1943
15.	28 Novembre 1943	Pacaembu, São Paulo	4–1	Bahia	1	Brasileirão de Seleções 1943
16.	5 December 1943	Pacaembu, São Paulo	3–5	São Paulo	2	Brasileirão de Seleções 1943
17.	8 December 1943	Pacaembu, São Paulo	0–5	São Paulo	0	Brasileirão de Seleções 1943
18.	27 October 1946		2–4	Paraná	1	Brasileirão de Seleções 1946
19.	29 Novembre 1946		0–5	São Paulo	0	Brasileirão de Seleções 1946
20.	5 February 1950	Eucaliptos, Porto Alegre	1–1	Paraná	0	Brasileirão de Seleções 1950
