= Siriri (footballer) =

Brazilian footballer

Personal information
- Full name: José de Andrade Torres
- Date of birth: December 24, 1904
- Place of birth: Santos, Brazil
- Date of death: 25 May 1978 (aged 73)
- Place of death: Santos, Brazil
- Position: Forward

Senior career*
Years	Team	Apps	(Gls)
1923–1929	Santos	113	(80)
1930–1931	São Paulo	46	(19)
- * Club domestic league appearances and goals as of 10 September 2023

José de Andrade Torres (24 December 1904 – 25 May 1978), better known as Siriri, was a Brazilian professional footballer who played as a forward.

== Career ==
Originally from Santos, it was at Santos FC where he built most of his career, alongside stars like Feitiço and Araken. After problems with members of Santos FC, he came with his brother-in-law Araken to the newly created São Paulo FC, where he was champion for the only time in his career in 1931. Siriri stopped playing after suffering a broken ankle, result of a violent tackle by C.E. América defender Pavani, on November 8, 1931.

== Personal life ==
Siriri was the younger brother of footballer Camarão, and brother-in-law of Araken and Ary Patusca.

== Honours ==
=== São Paulo ===
- Campeonato Paulista: 1931
