= Oswaldinho (footballer, born 1924) =

Brazilian footballer

Personal information
- Full name: Oswaldo Buzzoni
- Date of birth: 7 January 1924
- Place of birth: São Paulo, Brazil
- Date of death: 27 May 1988 (aged 64)
- Place of death: São Paulo, Brazil
- Position: Forward

Youth career
- Piccim
- Âncora Paulista
- Maria Zélia

Senior career*
Years	Team	Apps	(Gls)
1943–1945	Juventus-SP	113	(41)
1945–1949	Palmeiras	124	(51)
1949–1957	Portuguesa	100	(38)
1950	→ Paulista (loan)		
- * Club domestic league appearances and goals as of 16 January 2024

Oswaldo Buzzoni (7 January 1924 – 27 May 1988), was a Brazilian professional footballer who played as a forward.

== Career ==
Player of the amateur football in São Paulo, Oswaldinho received in 1943 the chance to become a professional at CA Juventus. He stood out for his great commitment on and off the field, an atypical attitude for the time. He caught the attention of Palmeiras and was part of the state champion squad in 1947. Also played for Portuguesa, with 100 appearances and 38 goals.

== Honours ==
Palmeiras

- Campeonato Paulista: 1947
