= José Rueda =

Brazilian footballer

Personal information
- Date of birth: 8 March 1900
- Place of birth: Guaxupé, Brazil
- Position: Defender

International career
Years	Team	Apps	(Gls)
1925	Brazil	1	(0)

José Rueda (born 8 March 1900, date of death unknown) was a Brazilian footballer. He played in one match for the Brazil national football team in 1925. He was also part of Brazil's squad for the 1925 South American Championship.
