= José Augusto Brandão =

Brazilian footballer (1911–1989)

Personal information
- Full name: José Augusto Brandão
- Date of birth: 21 April 1911
- Place of birth: Taubate, Brazil
- Date of death: 20 July 1989 (aged 78)
- Position: Midfielder

Senior career*
Years	Team	Apps	(Gls)
1927–1930	Barra Funda		
1931–1932	Juventus		
1933–1934	Portuguesa		
1935–1946	Corinthians	162	(5)

International career
1936–1942	Brazil	16	(0)
Medal record
Representing Brazil
FIFA World Cup
Third place	1938 France
- * Club domestic league appearances and goals

José Augusto Brandão (April 21, 1911 – July 20, 1989) was an association football midfielder. He was born in Taubate, São Paulo State.

In his career (1927–1946) he played for Barra Funda, Juventus, Portuguesa and Corinthians. He played two matches for the national team in the 1938 World Cup.
