= 1932 in Brazilian football =

Football in Brazil
- Season: 1932

The following article presents a summary of the 1932 football (soccer) season in Brazil, which was the 31st season of competitive football in the country.

== Campeonato Paulista ==
Final Standings

Position	Team	Points	Played	Won	Drawn	Lost	For	Against	Difference
1	Palestra Itália-SP	22	11	11	0	0	49	8	41
2	Sâo Paulo	17	11	8	1	2	34	12	22
3	Juventus	16	11	8	0	3	31	18	13
4	Germânia	11	11	4	3	4	25	32	-7
5	Ypiranga-SP	10	11	4	2	5	27	22	5
6	Corinthians	10	11	5	0	6	29	28	1
7	Portuguesa	10	11	4	2	5	22	24	-2
8	Santos	10	11	5	0	6	26	31	-5
9	AA São Bento	9	11	3	3	5	22	27	-5
10	Atlético Santista	8	11	3	2	6	22	39	-17
11	Sírio	8	11	4	0	7	19	28	-9
12	SC Internacional de São Paulo	1	11	0	1	10	13	50	-37

Palestra Itália-SP declared as the Campeonato Paulista champions.

== State championship champions ==
State	Champion	State	Champion
Acre	-	Paraíba	Cabo Branco
Alagoas	not disputed	Paraná	Palestra Itália-PR
Amapá	-	Pernambuco	Santa Cruz
Amazonas	Rio Negro	Piauí	-
Bahia	Ypiranga-BA	Rio de Janeiro	Fluminense de Niterói
Ceará	Ceará	Rio de Janeiro (DF)	Botafogo
Espírito Santo	Vitória-ES	Rio Grande do Norte	ABC
Goiás	-	Rio Grande do Sul	Grêmio
Maranhão	Tupan	Rondônia	-
Mato Grosso	-	Santa Catarina	Figueirense
Minas Gerais	Atlético Mineiro (by LMDT); Villa Nova (by AMET)	São Paulo	Palestra Itália-SP
Pará	Paysandu	Sergipe	Sergipe

== Brazil national team ==
The following table lists all the games played by the Brazil national football team in official competitions and friendly matches during 1932.

Date	Opposition	Result	Score	Brazil scorers	Competition
November 27, 1932	(Brazil) Andarahy	W	7-2	Preguinho (5), Jarbas (2)	International Friendly (unofficial match)
December 4, 1932	Uruguay	W	2-1	Leônidas da Silva (2)	Copa Rio Branco
December 8, 1932	(Uruguay) Peñarol	W	1-0	Jarbas	International Friendly (unofficial match)
December 12, 1932	(Uruguay) Nacional	W	2-1	Walter, Gradim	International Friendly (unofficial match)
