= Chácara da Floresta =

Association football stadium in São Paulo, Brazil

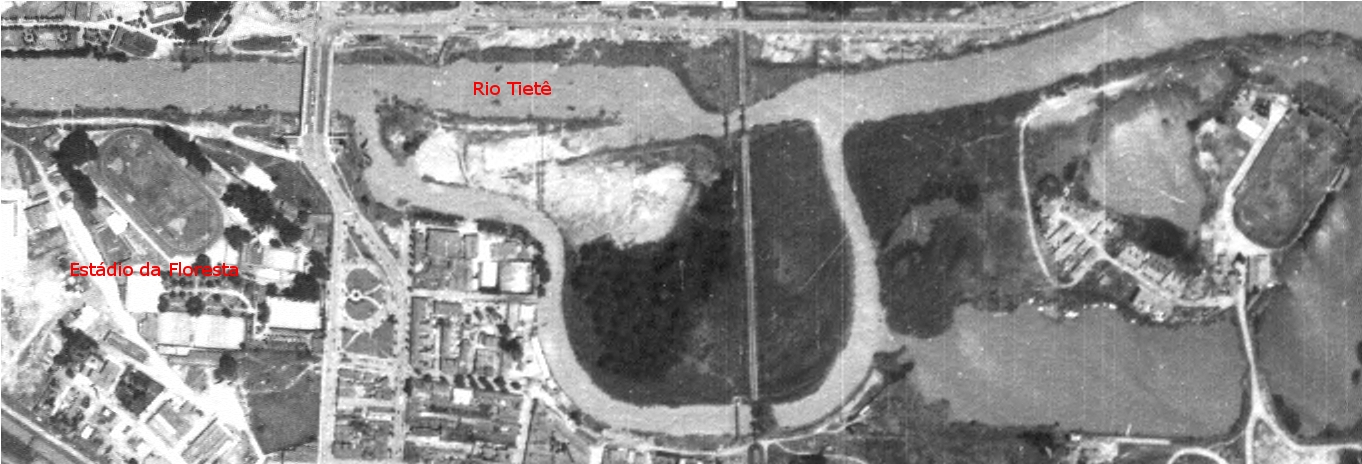
- Estádio da floresta 1940
- Interactive map of Chácara da Floresta
- Location: São Paulo, São Paulo state, Brazil
- Coordinates: 23°31′12.41″S 46°37′54.56″W
- Owner: AA das Palmeiras (1906–1929); São Paulo FC (1930–1935); CR Tietê (1935–2012)
- Capacity: 15.000 (there were no seats)
- Surface: Natural grass
- Field size: 85 by 60 metres (93.0 yd × 65.6 yd)

Construction
- Opened: 1906
- Closed: 2012

Tenants
- AA das Palmeiras; São Paulo FC; Independente EC; Brazil national football team

Chácara da Floresta (English: Forest Farmstead) was an association football stadium in São Paulo, Brazil.

It was used by AA das Palmeiras, a three-time state champion club, from 1906 to 1929. From 1930 to 1935, it was used by São Paulo FC, champion of 1931 Campeonato Paulista, which after financial problems, negotiated the ground with CR Tietê (focused on water sports) It was also used by Independente EC, a dissident of CR Tietê who participates in the 1935 Campeonato Paulista. After the insolvency of CR Tietê in 2012, the land where the ground was located belongs actually to the Municipality of São Paulo.

== Records ==
São Paulo FC record in Chácara da Floresta: 94 matches, 72 wins, 16 draws, 6 losses, 338 goals scored, 108 goals awarded (82,27% app).

Brazil national football team also played in Chácara da Floresta once time, against Paraguay on October 29, 2022, at Copa Rodrigues Alves. Brazil has won by 3–1.

The first match with its own night lighting in Brazil was held there, on March 28, 1930. São Paulo state football team (Portuguese: Seleção Paulista) vs Sportivo Buenos Aires. The São Paulo team won by an incredible 8–1.
