= Mário Seixas =

Brazilian footballer

Personal information
- Date of birth: 22 April 1902
- Place of birth: Campos dos Goytacazes, Brazil
- Position: Forward

International career
Years	Team	Apps	(Gls)
1923	Brazil	3	(0)

Mário Seixas (born 22 April 1902, date of death unknown) was a Brazilian footballer. He played in three matches for the Brazil national football team in 1923. He was also part of Brazil's squad for the 1923 South American Championship.
