= Pardal (footballer, born 1916) =

Brazilian footballer

Personal information
- Full name: Lino Mancilla
- Date of birth: 22 September 1916
- Place of birth: Pelotas, Brazil
- Date of death: 21 September 2020 (aged 103)
- Place of death: São Paulo, Brazil
- Position: Left winger

Youth career
- –1940: Pelotas

Senior career*
Years	Team	Apps	(Gls)
1940	Pelotas		
1941–1946	São Paulo	112	(56)
1946	Botafogo		
- * Club domestic league appearances and goals as of 10 September 2023

Lino Mancilla (22 September 1916 – 21 September 2020), mostly known as Pardal, was a Brazilian professional footballer who played as a left winger.

== Career ==
Pardal started in the youth sector at EC Pelotas, but it was at São Paulo FC where he spent most of his career, making 112 appearances and 56 goals.

== Honours ==
=== São Paulo ===
- Campeonato Paulista: 1943, 1945
- Taça Cidade de São Paulo: 1944
- Taça dos Campeões Estaduais Rio-São Paulo: 1943
