= Mário Vianna =

Brazilian football referee

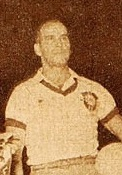
- Vianna in 1946
- Full name: Mário Gonçalves Vianna
- Born: September 6, 1902
- Died: 16 October 1989 (aged 87)

Domestic
Years	League	Role
1946–1957	CBF	Referee

International
Years	League	Role
1950–1954	FIFA	Referee

Mário Vianna (6 September 1902 – 16 October 1989) was a Brazilian football referee. He is nominated as an official referee list of the 1950 FIFA World Cup and 1954 FIFA World Cup.

== Personal life ==
Mário Vianna was born in Rio de Janeiro, Brazil in 1902. He was a police officer and began to follow the Campeonato Carioca football matches in the 1930s. Due to his imposition of respect and his knowledge of the game, he was invited to act as a referee in 1943. He was successful refereeing his first matches, gaining notoriety until refereeing the main matches of Rio de Janeiro. Thus, he became one of the three Brazilian referees to referee the 1950 World Cup, alongside Mário Gardelli and Alberto da Gama Malcher. At the age of 51, he refereed again in the 1954 World Cup. He also worked as a sportscaster, and was the only broadcaster to narrate the game between Brazil and Hungary (Batalha de Berna).

In the 60s, after retiring as a referee, he became a sports commentator for Rádio Globo, alongside big names in Brazilian sports chronicle such as João Saldanha.

Mário Vianna died in 1989 in Rio de Janeiro, at age of 87, victim of pneumonia.

== Controversies ==
He was responsible for the only sending off of Domingos da Guia. After the Switzerland-Italy game in 1954, he confessed years later that he punched striker Giampiero Boniperti, after being questioned by him.

At the final whistle of the Brazilian elimination against Hungary, Mário, who worked as a narrator in the game, started a conspiracy theory which said that the English referee Arthur Ellis had been bought by the Communist Party of Hungary. In 1957, three years after the incident, Vianna refereed a friendly match between Honvéd, with Ferenc Puskas, and Flamengo, in Budapest.

== Matches at the FIFA World Cup ==
Altogether Vianna had two participations in World Cups as referee, and two as assistant referee:

=== Main referee ===
Team 1	Result	Team 2	Edition
Spain	3–1	United States	1950 FIFA World Cup
Switzerland	2–1	Italy	1954 FIFA World Cup

=== Assistant referee ===
Team 1	Result	Team 2	Edition
Uruguay	8–0	Bolivia	1950 FIFA World Cup
Austria	1–0	Scotland	1954 FIFA World Cup
