= Pipi (footballer, born 1915) =

Brazilian footballer (1915–2001)

Personal information
- Full name: Serafim Pinto Ribeiro Júnior
- Date of birth: 10 December 1915
- Date of death: 4 July 2001 (aged 85)
- Position: Forward

International career
| Years | Team | Apps | (Gls) |
| 1942 | Brazil | 3 | (0) |

Serafim Pinto Ribeiro Júnior (10 December 1915 – 4 July 2001), known as Pipi, was a Brazilian footballer who played as a forward. He made three appearances for the Brazil national team in 1942. He was also part of Brazil's squad for the 1942 South American Championship.
