= Hermes (footballer, born 1925) =

Brazilian footballer (1925–2011)

Personal information
- Full name: Hermes Nunes da Conceição
- Date of birth: 19 December 1925
- Place of birth: Taquari, Brazil
- Date of death: 27 June 2011 (aged 85)
- Place of death: Porto Alegre, Brazil
- Position: Forward

Senior career*
Years	Team	Apps	(Gls)
1947–1950	Grêmio	100	(65)
1950–1955	Flamengo	72	(52)
1956–1959	Cruzeiro-RS		
- * Club domestic league appearances and goals

Hermes Nunes da Conceição (19 December 1925 – 27 June 2011), simply known as Hermes, was a Brazilian professional footballer who played as a forward.

== Career ==
A striker, Hermes played for Grêmio where he made 100 appearances and scored 65 goals, and for Flamengo where he played 72 matches and scored 52 goals. He also defended the state team of Rio Grande do Sul and the Brazilian military team.

== Honours ==
Grêmio

- Campeonato Gaúcho: 1949
- Campeonato Citadino de Porto Alegre: 1949
- Torneio Extra de Porto Alegre: 1948, 1949
