= Antonio Dias (footballer) =

Brazilian footballer

Personal information
- Date of birth: 20 August 1893
- Position: Inside right

Senior career*
Years	Team	Apps	(Gls)
1913	Corinthians		
1914	São Bento		
1915	Maranhão		
1916–1923	São Bento		

International career
1917	Brazil	4	(0)
- * Club domestic league appearances and goals

Antonio Dias (born 20 August 1893, date of death unknown) was a Brazilian footballer who played as a forward. He played in four matches for the Brazil national football team in 1917. He was also part of Brazil's squad for the 1917 South American Championship.
