= Raphael Rodrigues (footballer, born 1894) =

Brazilian footballer

Personal information
- Date of birth: 16 May 1894
- Place of birth: São Paulo, Brazil
- Date of death: 30 November 1981 (aged 87)
- Place of death: São Paulo, Brazil
- Position: Forward

Senior career*
Years	Team	Apps	(Gls)
- Internacional-SP
1922–1929	Corinthians		

International career
1922	Brazil	4	(0)
- * Club domestic league appearances and goals

Raphael Rodrigues (16 May 1894 – 30 November 1981) was a Brazilian footballer. He played in four matches for the Brazil national football team in 1922. He was also part of Brazil's squad for the 1922 South American Championship.
