= Lelé =

Brazilian footballer (1918–2003)

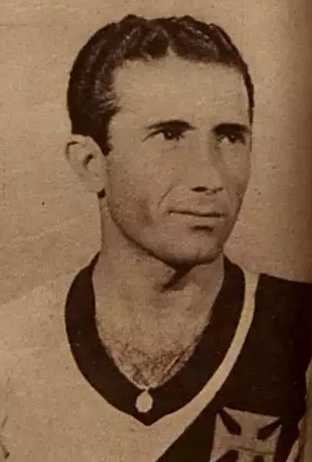
- Lelé in 1945

Personal information
- Full name: Manoel Pessanha
- Date of birth: 23 March 1918
- Place of birth: Campos dos Goytacazes, Brazil
- Date of death: 16 August 2003 (aged 85)
- Place of death: Campos dos Goytacazes, Brazil
- Position: Forward

Senior career*
Years	Team	Apps	(Gls)
- Madureira
- Vasco da Gama

International career
1940–1945	Brazil	4	(1)
- * Club domestic league appearances and goals

Manoel Pessanha (23 March 1918 – 16 August 2003), known as Lelé, was a Brazilian footballer who played as a forward. He made four matches for the Brazil national team from 1940 to 1945. He was also part of Brazil's squad for the 1946 South American Championship.
