= Petronilho de Brito =

Brazilian footballer

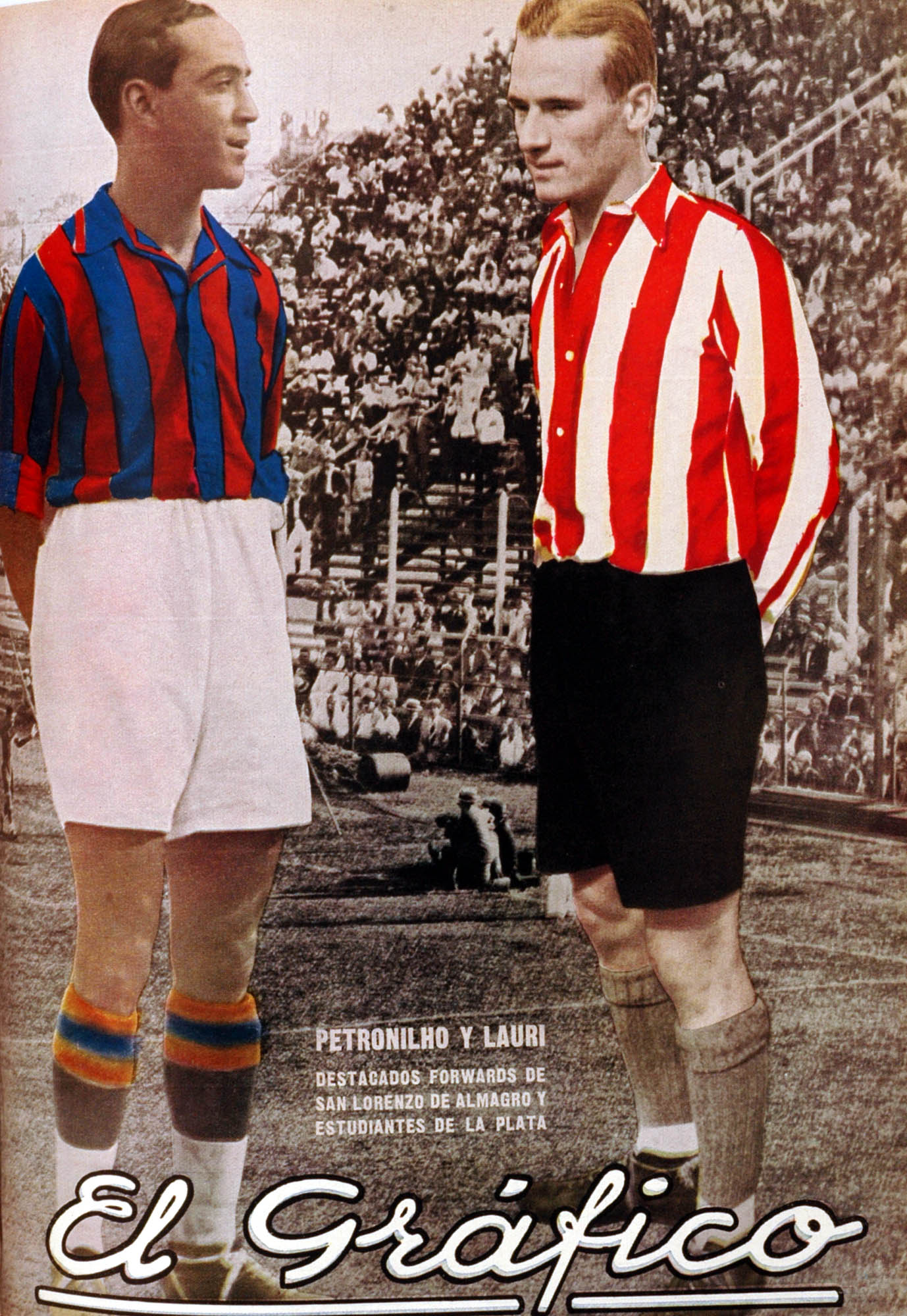

Personal information
- Full name: Petronilho de Brito
- Date of birth: 31 May 1904
- Place of birth: São Paulo, São Paulo, Brazil
- Place of death: Cerquilho, São Paulo, Brazil
- Position: Forward

Senior career*
Years	Team	Apps	(Gls)
- Antárctica-SP
- Minas Gerais-SP
- Sírio-SP
- Independência-SP
1933–1935	San Lorenzo	53	(31)

International career
1926	São Paulo	4	(13)
- * Club domestic league appearances and goals

Petronilho de Brito(31 May 1904 – 1983), was an association footballer who played forward, and who played for the Brazil national team. He died in 1983, in São Paulo.

== Club career ==
Born in São Paulo, Petronilho de Brito spent most of his career defending clubs of that city. He played for Antárctica-SP, Minas Gerais-SP, Sírio-SP and Independência-SP, winning the Campeonato Brasileiro de Seleções Estaduais in 1926, representing the state of São Paulo, and being awarded as the competition's top goalscorer with 13 goals, before moving to San Lorenzo of Argentina in 1930. He won the Primera División Argentina in 1933, retiring in 1936.

== International career ==
Petronilho de Brito played five unofficial games for the Brazil national team between 1928 and 1935. He played his first game on June 24, 1928, against Motherwell of Scotland, and scored his first goal for Brazil on February 24, 1929, against Rampla Juniors of Uruguay. Petronilho played his last game for the country on February 24, 1935, against River Plate of Argentina.

== Personal life ==
He is the brother of former footballer Waldemar de Brito.

== Honours ==
=== Club ===
San Lorenzo

- Primera División Argentina: 1933

State of São Paulo

- Campeonato Brasileiro de Seleções Estaduais: 1926

=== Individual ===
- Campeonato Brasileiro de Seleções Estaduais top goalscorer (13 gols): 1926
