= Estádio da Ponte Grande =

Football stadium in Brazil

- Interactive map of Estádio da Ponte Grande
- Full name: Estádio da Ponte Grande
- Location: São Paulo, Brazil
- Coordinates: 22.85643°S 47.18959°W
- Owner: Corinthians
- Operator: Corinthians
- Surface: Natural grass

Construction
- Opened: 1918 to 1928

Tenant
- Corinthians

Estádio da Ponte Grande was a São Paulo, Brazil-based football stadium owned by São Paulo sports club Corinthians.

== History ==
The club's players and fans managed to build a new stadium for the club in 1918, and Corinthians would play at the Estádio da Ponte Grande for nine years.
