= Waldemar de Brito =

Brazilian footballer (1913–1979)

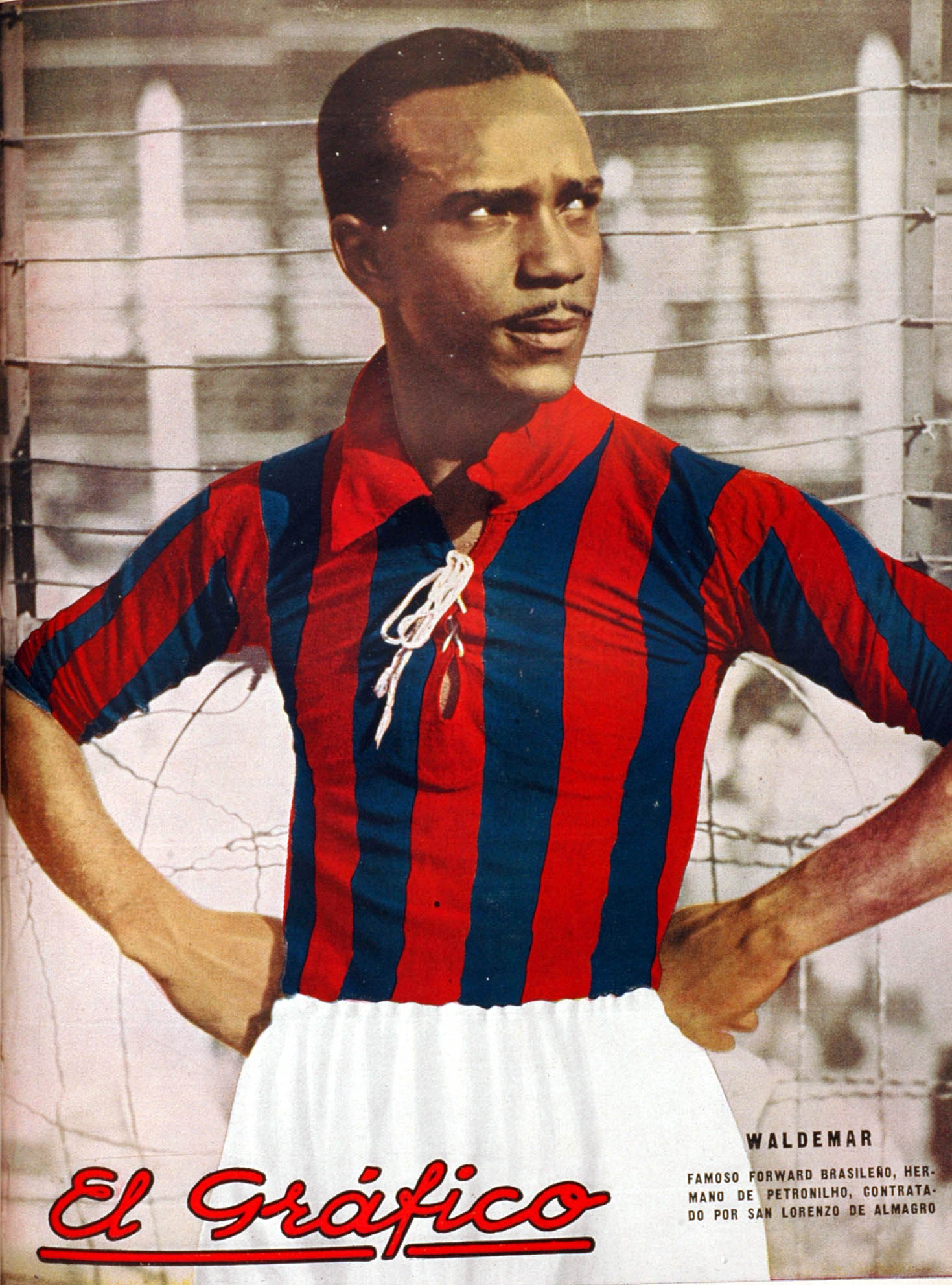
- Waldemar playing for San Lorenzo in 1935

Personal information
- Full name: Waldemar de Brito
- Date of birth: 17 May 1913
- Place of birth: São Paulo, Brazil
- Date of death: 21 February 1979 (aged 65)
- Place of death: São Paulo, Brazil
- Height: 1.76 m (5 ft 9 1/2 in)
- Position: Forward

Youth career
- 1923–1927: São Paulo

Senior career*
Years	Team	Apps	(Gls)
1927–1932	Syrio	40	(12)
1928	→ Independência (loan)	3	(0)
1933–1934	São Paulo	17	(22)
1934	Botafogo	-	(-)
1935–1937	San Lorenzo	3	(3)
1937–1939	Flamengo	32	(20)
1939–1941	San Lorenzo	42	(22)
1942–1943	São Paulo	17	(21)
1944	Fluminense	-	(-)
1944	Portuguesa	8	(5)
1945–1946	Palmeiras	5	(3)
1946	Portuguesa Santista	6	(5)
Total		173	(113)

International career
1934–1942	Brazil	18	(18)
- * Club domestic league appearances and goals

Waldemar de Brito (Portuguese pronunciation: [vɐwdeˈmaʁ dʒi ˈbɾitu], 17 May 1913 – 21 February 1979) was a Brazilian footballer who played as a forward for several clubs in Brazil and Argentina, as well as for the Brazil national team. He was considered as one of the best dribblers in Brazil in the 1930s and he was one of the youngest players to scorre a hat-trick in the country. Waldemar de Brito is also acknowledged to have discovered Pelé during the latter's early footballing days. His brother, Petronilho de Brito, was also a footballer.

== Club career ==
Waldemar, a native of São Paulo, played as an inside forward or as centre forward. At the beginning of his career, he played for the local clubs Syrio, Independência, and São Paulo da Floresta, today's São Paulo FC; he was top goalscorer of the Rio-São Paulo Tournament with 21 goals. The following year, he moved to Botafogo, where he spent a short time, before transferring to San Lorenzo de Almagro in the Argentine first division. In 1936, he returned to Brazil, this time to play for Flamengo. He went back to São Paulo in 1943, to play for Portuguesa de Desportos. He finished his playing career in 1945 with Portuguesa Santista.

== International career ==
Waldemar was capped 18 times for the Brazil national team, scoring 18 goals. He played at the 1934 World Cup, where Brazil was eliminated by Spain in the first round. In that match, Waldemar took a penalty kick for Brazil, but Spain goalkeeper Ricardo Zamora saved his shot.

== Post-playing career ==
After he retired, Waldemar de Brito was part of a project to scout young talents at Bauru Atlético Clube. In 1954, he spotted a kid named Edson Arantes do Nascimento, whom he took to Santos FC, predicting that he would become the greatest footballer in the world. Although Waldemar is recognized for his own talent while he was a player, it is perhaps his scouting of Pelé that makes him most notable in the history of football in Brazil.
