= Adãozinho =

Brazilian footballer (1923-1991)

Personal information
- Full name: Adão Nunes Dornelles
- Date of birth: April 2, 1923
- Place of birth: Brazil
- Date of death: August 30, 1991 (aged 68)
- Position: Forward

Senior career*
Years	Team	Apps	(Gls)
1932–1942	Diário Official		
1943–1951	Internacional		
1951–1953	Flamengo		
- XV de Jaú

International career
- Brazil
Medal record
Representing Brazil
FIFA World Cup
Runner-up	1950 Brazil
- * Club domestic league appearances and goals

Adão Nunes Dornelles (April 2, 1923 – August 30, 1991), better known as ’’Adãozinho’’, was a Brazilian footballer who played the striker role for the Brazilian team, he started in three matches. He participated at the 1950 FIFA World Cup, without playing a game. Adãozinho was born in Porto Alegre and played for Internacional, until 1950 when a move to Flamengo was agreed. He died in August 1991, at the age of 68.

== Clubs ==
- Diário Official F. C.: 1932 – 1942
- Internacional: 1943 – 1951
- Flamengo: 1951 – 1953
- XV de Jaú: 1951 – 1953

== Honours ==
Internacional

- Campeonato Gaúcho: 1944, 1945, 1947, 1948, 1950

Flamengo

- Campeonato Carioca: 1953

Brazil

- FIFA World Cup: Runner-up 1950
