= Camarão (footballer) =

Brazilian footballer

Personal information
- Full name: Aníbal de Andrade Torres
- Date of birth: 2 February 1902
- Place of birth: Santos, Brazil
- Date of death: 24 May 1984 (aged 82)
- Place of death: Santos, Brazil
- Positions: Midfielder; forward

Senior career*
Years	Team	Apps	(Gls)
1918–1922	Brasil FC		
1923–1934	Santos	273	(147)

Managerial career
- 1937: Santos
- 1938–1939: Santos
- * Club domestic league appearances and goals

Aníbal de Andrade Torres (2 February 1902 – 24 May 1984), better known as Camarão, was a Brazilian professional footballer and manager who played both as a midfielder and as a forward.

== Career ==
Camarão began his career at Brasil FC de Santos, and in 1923 he moved to Santos FC, where he would become one of the greatest scorers in the club's history, with 147 goals in 273 matches. Notable for his enormous versatility on the field, scored the first goal in a night game with lights held in Vila Belmiro on March 21, 1931. Camarão was also the club's coach on two occasions, in the late 1930s.

== Personal life ==
Camarão was brother of the also footballer Siriri.
