= Alexandre De Maria =

Brazilian footballer (1904-1968)

De Maria
Personal information
- Full name: Alexandre de Maria
- Date of birth: 19 June 1904
- Place of birth: Votorantim, Brazil
- Date of death: 17 March 1968 (aged 63)
- Place of death: São Paulo, Brazil
- Height: 1.90 m (6 ft 3 in)
- Position: Left winger

Senior career*
| Years | Team | Apps | (Gls) |
| 1921–1926 | CA Independência | | |
| 1926–1931 | Corinthians | 106 | (90) |
| 1931–1935 | Lazio | 103 | (29) |
| 1935–1936 | Corinthians | 13 | (2) |

International career
| 1928–1931 | Brazil (unofficial) | 4 | (1) |
| 1932–1934 | Italy B | 2 | (3) |
- * Club domestic league appearances and goals as of 10 February 2024

Alexandre De Maria (19 June 1904 – 17 March 1968), simply known as De Maria and sometimes referred as Alejandro Demaría or Alessandro De Maria, was a Brazilian–born and Italian professional footballer who played as a left winger.

== Career ==
Starting his career at Club Athletico Independência, he arrived at Corinthians in 1926, standing out for his height of 1.90 m (6 ft 3 in). Even though he was clumsy, he scored several goals, standing out enough to be hired by S.S. Lazio in 1931 alongside Filó, Armando Del Debbio and Rato Castelli. De Maria also scored the first goal of the history of Parque São Jorge stadium.

== International career ==
In his international career, De Maria played unofficial friendlies for Brazil from 1928 to 1931, such as a match against Ferencváros, and a few more matches for Italy between 1932 and 1934.

== Honours ==
Corinthians

- Campeonato Paulista: 1928, 1929, 1930
- Taça dos Campeões Estaduais Rio-São Paulo: 1929
