= Gambinha =

Brazilian footballer

Personal information
- Full name: Guido Gambarotta
- Date of birth: 17 November 1907
- Place of birth: São Paulo, Brazil
- Date of death: 22 April 1981 (aged 73)
- Place of death: São Paulo, Brazil
- Position: Forward

Senior career*
Years	Team	Apps	(Gls)
1926–1933	Corinthians	116	(94)
- * Club domestic league appearances and goals as of 2 February 2024

Guido Gambarotta (17 November 1907 – 22 April 1981), better known as Gambinha, was a Brazilian footballer who played as a forward.

== Career ==
Gambinha played his entire career at Corinthians, from 1926 to 1933, being three-time state champion in 1928, 1929 and 1930, making 116 appearances and scoring 94 goals. Among these goals, he scored the first of the Clássico Majestoso, as well as a goal against the Brazil national football team.

== Honours ==
Corinthians

- Campeonato Paulista: 1928, 1929, 1930
- Taça dos Campeões Estaduais Rio-São Paulo: 1929

== Personal life ==
Gambinha is the young brother of the also SC Corinthians footballer Gambarotta.
