= Mário Milani =

Brazilian footballer

Personal information
- Full name: Mário Milani
- Date of birth: 15 August 1918
- Place of birth: Jundiaí, Brazil
- Date of death: 24 September 2003 (aged 85)
- Place of death: Jundiaí, Brazil
- Position: Forward

Youth career
- –1937: Comercial de Jundiaí

Senior career*
Years	Team	Apps	(Gls)
1937–1938	São Paulo	40	(22)
1939–1940	Fluminense	49	(39)
1941–1948	Corinthians	131	(99)
1948–1950	Juventus	38	(13)
- * Club domestic league appearances and goals as of 16 September 2023

Mário Milani (15 August 1918 – 24 September 2003), was a Brazilian professional footballer who played as a forward.

== Career ==
A standout in the Jundiaí amateur championships, he was detected by scouts from São Paulo FC, his first professional club. In 1938 he was nominated by fellow countryman Romeu to join Fluminense, where he was state champion in 1940. He returned to the state of São Paulo, this time at Corinthians, a club for which he played 131 times and scored 99 goals.

== Honours ==
Fluminense

- Campeonato Carioca: 1940

Corinthians

- Campeonato Paulista: 1941

Individual

- Campeonato Paulista top scorer: 1942, 1943
