= Hércules (footballer, born 1912) =

Brazilian footballer

Personal information
- Full name: Hércules de Miranda
- Date of birth: 2 July 1912
- Place of birth: Guaxupé, Brazil
- Date of death: 3 September 1982 (aged 70)
- Place of death: Rio de Janeiro, Brazil
- Position: Forward

Senior career*
Years	Team	Apps	(Gls)
1930–1933	Juventus		
1933–1934	São Paulo		
1935–1941	Fluminense		
1942–1948	Corinthians		

International career
1938–1940	Brazil	6	(3)
Medal record
Representing Brazil
FIFA World Cup
Third place	1938 France
- * Club domestic league appearances and goals

Hércules de Miranda, commonly known as just Hércules (June 2, 1912 – September 3, 1982), was an association footballer who played forward in the 1938 FIFA World Cup with Brazil.

== Career ==
Hércules was born in Guaxupé, Minas Gerais state. He started his career in 1930, playing for Juventus, leaving the club in 1933, joining São Paulo. He moved to Fluminense in 1935, leaving the club in 1941, after winning the Campeonato Carioca in 1936, 1937, 1938, 1940 and in 1941, and scoring 164 goals in 176 games. Hércules de Miranda joined Corinthians in 1942, playing 73 games and scoring 53 goals for the club until his retirement in 1948.

=== National team ===
He played six games for Brazil, scoring three goals. Hércules debut defending the national team was a 1938 FIFA World Cup game, played on June 5, 1938, against Poland. Hércules de Miranda scored his first two goals for the Braziln national team on March 10, 1940, against Argentina. His last game defending Brazil was played on March 31, 1940, when his country and Uruguay drew 1–1.

== Honors ==
=== Club ===
Fluminense

- Campeonato Carioca: 1936, 1937, 1938, 1940, 1941
