= Servílio de Jesús =

Brazilian footballer

Personal information
- Date of birth: 15 April 1914
- Date of death: 10 April 1984 (aged 69)
- Position: Forward

International career
Years	Team	Apps	(Gls)
1942–1945	Brazil	6	(1)

Servílio de Jesús (15 April 1914 – 10 April 1984) was a Brazilian footballer. He played in six matches for the Brazil national football team from 1942 to 1945. He was also part of Brazil's squad for the 1942 South American Championship.

== Personal life ==
Servílio de Jesús is father of the also footballer Servílio (Servilio de Jesús Filho).
