= Luís Matoso =

Brazilian footballer (1901–1985)

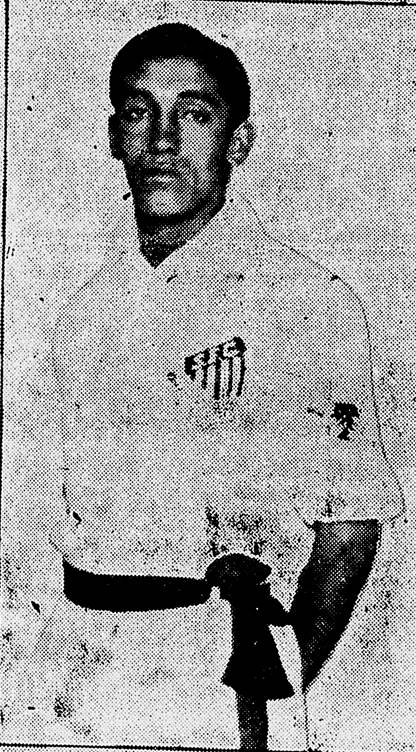
- Feitiço in 1936

Personal information
- Full name: Luís Macedo Matoso
- Date of birth: 29 December 1901
- Place of birth: São Paulo, Brazil
- Date of death: 23 August 1985 (aged 83)
- Place of death: São Paulo, Brazil
- Position: Forward

Senior career*
Years	Team	Apps	(Gls)
1921	Corinthians	1	(1)
1921-1926	AA São Bento	?	(86)
1927-1932	Santos	150	(216)
1932-1933	Corinthians	11	(11)
1933-1936	Peñarol	?	(97)
1936	Santos	1	(1)
1936-1938	Vasco da Gama	?	(34)
1938-1939	Palmeiras	66	(28)
1957	São Cristóvão	3+	(3)
Total		232+	(443+)
- * Club domestic league appearances and goals

Luis Macedo Matoso (29 December 1901 – 23 August 1985), known as Feitiço, was a Brazilian footballer who played as a forward. He played for the Brazil national team and was six times top scorer of the State championship of São Paulo.

== Life ==
Born in São Paulo, Feitiço spent his childhood and youth in the São Paulo neighborhood of Bixiga, a quarter with strong Italian influences, where he began playing football.

He started his career with a single match in 1921 for SC Corinthians Paulista. In 1923 the center-forward joined Associação Atlética São Bento in downtown São Paulo, where he was top scorer of the State Championship in 1923, 24 and 25, winning the title in 1925. In 1926 he joined Santos FC where in 1927 he was part the famous hundred goals attack. He once more was top scorer of the Campeonato Paulista in 1929, 1930 and 1931.

1932 to 1933 he played again for Corinthians, where this time he scored 12 times in 12 matches. From 1933 to 1935 he played in the Uruguayan capital Montevideo for CA Peñarol, where in his first year after two hard-fought 0–0's in the championship decider against Nacional Peñarol eventually lost the third match 3–2. In 1935 Peñarol won the championship of Uruguay. In 1936 he returned briefly to Santos, where he altogether scored 216 goals in 151 matches. Later that year he moved to Rio to Janeiro to play for CR Vasco da Gama winning the State Championship in his first year, being acclaimed as best player of his side. 1938 to 1938 he played again in São Paulo, his time for Palestra Itália, today's SE Palmeiras. 1940 he returned to Rio to end his career in the north of the town with São Cristóvão FR.

He played in 1931 in one official match for the Brazil national team, against Uruguay. He played on more occasions for the national team, but then against club teams. His major competitors here were Arthur Friedenreich, Nilo and in the end the legendary "rubber man" Leônidas da Silva.

He died on 23 August 1985, in São Paulo.
