= Eduardo Lima (Brazilian footballer) =

Brazilian footballer (1920–1973)

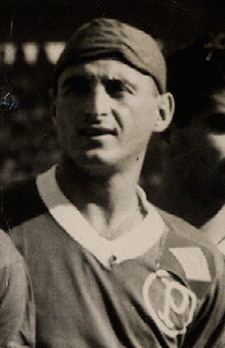

Personal information
- Date of birth: 22 August 1920
- Place of birth: São Paulo, Brazil
- Date of death: 17 July 1973 (aged 52)
- Position: Midfielder

Senior career*
Years	Team	Apps	(Gls)
1938–1954	Palmeiras	467	(148)

International career
1944–1947	Brazil	8	(3)
- * Club domestic league appearances and goals

Eduardo Jorge de Lima, often referred to as simply Lima (22 August 1920 – 17 July 1973), was a Brazilian footballer who played as a midfielder and spent his entire career playing for Palmeiras, from 1938 to 1954, winning the 1951 Copa Rio.

He also played in eight matches for the Brazil national football team, from 1944 to 1947, and was part of Brazil's squad for the 1946 South American Championship.

== Honours ==
Palmeiras

- Copa Rio: 1951
- Rio-São Paulo Tournament: 1951
- São Paulo State Championship: 1940, 1942, 1944, 1947, 1950
- Taça Cidade de São Paulo: 1945, 1946, 1950, 1951

Brazil

- Roca Cup (1945)
- South American Championship runner-up: 1946
