= Rio de Janeiro state football team results (1901–1950) =

This is a list of results for all the matches played from 1901 to 1950 by the Rio de Janeiro state football team.

== Results ==
19 Oct 1901 Friendly	São Paulo (São Paulo (state))	2–2	Rio de Janeiro	São Paulo
	Jeffery; Alício		Frias; McCulloch	Stadium: Velódromo Paulistano

20 Oct 1901 Friendly	São Paulo (São Paulo (state))	0–0	Rio de Janeiro	São Paulo
				Stadium: Velódromo Paulistano

24 Jun 1906 Friendly	Rio de Janeiro	1–2	(São Paulo (state)) São Paulo	Rio de Janeiro
	Cox		Duarte	Stadium: Estádio das Laranjeiras

12 Oct 1906 Friendly	São Paulo (São Paulo (state))	0–2	Rio de Janeiro	São Paulo
			Goal	Stadium: Velódromo Paulistano

9 Dec 1906 Friendly	São Paulo (São Paulo (state))	4–0	Rio de Janeiro	São Paulo
	Friese; Charles Miller			Stadium: Velódromo Paulistano

25 Aug 1907 Taça Brasil de Seleções	São Paulo (São Paulo (state))	4–1	Rio de Janeiro	São Paulo
	Léo; Oscar de Andrade; Aquino; Colston		Oswaldo Gomes	Stadium: Velódromo Paulistano

29 Sep 1907 Friendly	Botafogo (Brazil)	3–1	Rio de Janeiro	Rio de Janeiro
	Goal		Mutzenbecher	Stadium: General Severiano

12 Oct 1907 Taça Brasil de Seleções	Rio de Janeiro	0–1	(São Paulo (state)) São Paulo	Rio de Janeiro
			Léo	Stadium: Rua Paysandu

9 Jul 1908 International	Rio de Janeiro	2–3	Argentina	Rio de Janeiro
	E. Etchegaray 7'; Raphael Sampaio 34'		F. Dickinson 17'; Burgos 55'; V. Etchegaray 79' (o.g.)	Stadium: Estádio das Laranjeiras; Referee: Mariano Reyna (ARG)

12 Jul 1908 International	Rio de Janeiro	0–3	Argentina	Rio de Janeiro
			Ernesto Brown 1', 55', 70'	Stadium: Estádio das Laranjeiras; Referee: Mariano Reyna (ARG)

26 Aug 1910 Friendly	Rio de Janeiro	1–8	(England) Corinthian	Rio de Janeiro
	Abelardo de Lamare		Day; Coleby; Vidal	Stadium: Estádio das Laranjeiras

28 Aug 1910 Friendly	Rio de Janeiro	2–5	(England) Corinthian	Rio de Janeiro
	Abelardo de Lamare; Cox		Sneil; Day; Coleby; Owen	Stadium: Estádio das Laranjeiras

12 Sep 1912 International	Rio de Janeiro	0–4	Argentina	Rio de Janeiro
			Ernesto Brown 2'; Ohaco 60'; Hayes 72', 85'	Stadium: Estádio das Laranjeiras; Referee: H. Alfano (ARG)

16 Sep 1912 International	Rio de Janeiro	0–5	Argentina	Rio de Janeiro
			Hayes 20', 37', 65', 80'; M. Susán 20'	Stadium: Estádio das Laranjeiras; Referee: V. Etchegaray (ARG)

7 Nov 1912 Friendly	Anita Garibaldi XI (Brazil)	0–6	Rio de Janeiro	Anita Garibaldi
			Raul de Carvalho; Píndaro; Paranhos; Gallo; Juquinha

10 Nov 1912 Friendly	São Paulo-RS (Brazil)	0–4	Rio de Janeiro	Rio Grande
			Goal

11 Nov 1912 Friendly	São Paulo-RS (Brazil)	1–0	Rio de Janeiro	Rio Grande
	Goal

12 Nov 1912 Friendly	EC Pelotas (Brazil)	0–0	Rio de Janeiro	Pelotas

15 Nov 1912 Friendly	Rio Grande do Sul	0–1	Rio de Janeiro	Porto Alegre
			Goal

17 Nov 1912 Friendly	Rio Branco (Bagé) (Brazil)	1–1	Rio de Janeiro	Bagé
	Goal		Goal

20 Nov 1912 Friendly	Porto Alegre XI (Brazil)	1–1	Rio de Janeiro	Porto Alegre
	Goal		Goal

23 Nov 1912 Friendly	FC Porto Alegre (Brazil)	0–8	Rio de Janeiro	Porto Alegre
			Paranhos; Milton; Amarante; Raul de Carvalho

24 Nov 1912 Friendly	Grêmio (Brazil)	0–4	Rio de Janeiro	Porto Alegre
	Goal		Guimarães; Píndaro

26 Nov 1912 Friendly	Pelotas XI (Brazil)	0–4	Rio de Janeiro	Porto Alegre
			Goal

14 Jul 1913 International	Rio de Janeiro	1–0	Portugal	Rio de Janeiro
	Borgerth			Stadium: Estádio das Laranjeiras

21 Aug 1913 Friendly	Rio de Janeiro	2–1	(England) Corinthian	Rio de Janeiro
	Pullen 11'; Welfare 77'		Woosnam 52'	Stadium: Estádio das Laranjeiras

23 Aug 1913 Friendly	Rio de Janeiro	1–2	(England) Corinthian	Rio de Janeiro
	Mimi Sodré 74'		Hoffmeister 20'; Day 60'	Stadium: Estádio das Laranjeiras

16 Sep 1913 International	Rio de Janeiro	2–1	Chile	Rio de Janeiro
	Borgerth; Rolando de Lamare		Goal	Stadium: Estádio das Laranjeiras

20 Sep 1913 International	Rio de Janeiro	5–0	HMS Glasgow Crew	Rio de Janeiro
	Mimi Sodré; Welfare; Oswaldo Gomes; Rolando de Lamare		Goal	Stadium: Estádio das Laranjeiras

21 Sep 1913 International	Rio de Janeiro	6–1	Chile	Rio de Janeiro
	Welfare; Lincoln; Witte; Pullen		Goal	Stadium: Estádio das Laranjeiras

16 Nov 1913 Taça Rio-São Paulo de Seleções	São Paulo (São Paulo (state))	0–0	Rio de Janeiro	São Paulo
				Stadium: Parque Antártica

7 Dec 1913 Friendly	America-RJ (Brazil)	1–1	Rio de Janeiro	Rio de Janeiro
	Goal		Pullen	Stadium: Rua Ferrer

28 Jun 1914 Taça Rio-São Paulo de Seleções	Rio de Janeiro	1–1	(São Paulo (state)) São Paulo	Rio de Janeiro
	Welfare		Juvenal	Stadium: Estádio das Laranjeiras

19 Jul 1914 Friendly	Rio de Janeiro	3–5	(England) Exeter City	Rio de Janeiro
	Welfare		Harding; Marshall; Lovett; Hunter	Stadium: Estádio das Laranjeiras; Referee: H. Graham (ENG)

30 Aug 1914 Taça Rio-São Paulo de Seleções	São Paulo (São Paulo (state))	4–2	Rio de Janeiro	São Paulo
	Rubens Salles; Formiga; Demóstenes		Welfare; Ojeda	Stadium: Parque Antártica

6 Dec 1914 Friendly	Rio de Janeiro	2–1	(Brazil) Flamengo	Rio de Janeiro
	Haroldo; Welfare		Riemer	Stadium: Estádio das Laranjeiras

27 Jun 1915 Taça Rio-São Paulo de Seleções	São Paulo (São Paulo (state))	2–1	Rio de Janeiro	São Paulo
	Nazaré; Demóstenes		Mimi Sodré	Stadium: Parque Antártica

3 Oct 1915 Taça Rio-São Paulo de Seleções	Rio de Janeiro	5–2	(São Paulo (state)) São Paulo	Rio de Janeiro
	Luís Menezes; Welfare; Pullen		Formiga; Hopkins	Stadium: Estádio das Laranjeiras

7 Nov 1915 Taça Rio-São Paulo de Seleções	São Paulo (São Paulo (state))	8–0	Rio de Janeiro	São Paulo
	Friedenreich; Demóstenes; MacLean; Formiga			Stadium: Velódromo Paulistano

14 Nov 1915 Friendly	Rio de Janeiro	1–3	(Brazil) Flamengo	Rio de Janeiro
	Couto		Gumercindo; Riemer	Stadium: Estádio das Laranjeiras

13 Aug 1916 Taça Rio-São Paulo de Seleções	São Paulo (São Paulo (state))	5–0	Rio de Janeiro	São Paulo
	Friedenreich; MacLean; Hopkins			Stadium: Velódromo Paulistano

24 Sep 1916 Taça Rio-São Paulo de Seleções	Rio de Janeiro	1–3	(São Paulo (state)) São Paulo	Rio de Janeiro
	Luís Menezes		MacLean; Zacchi	Stadium: Estádio das Laranjeiras

24 Dec 1916 Friendly	Rio de Janeiro	2–1	(Brazil) America-RJ	Rio de Janeiro
	Benedicto; Carregal		Goal	Stadium: Estádio das Laranjeiras

9 Jan 1917 Friendly	Rio de Janeiro	1–2	(Uruguay) Dublin	Rio de Janeiro
	Aluízio 25'		H. Scarone 3'; Romano 75'	Stadium: General Severiano; Referee: Alberto Borgeth

16 May 1917 Friendly	Rio de Janeiro	1–0	(Argentina) Sportivo Barracas	Rio de Janeiro
	French 72'			Stadium: Estádio das Laranjeiras; Referee: C. Gardi (ARG)

24 Jun 1917 Friendly	Rio de Janeiro	0–1	(São Paulo (state)) São Paulo	Rio de Janeiro
			Amílcar	Stadium: Estádio das Laranjeiras

29 Jul 1917 Friendly	São Paulo (São Paulo (state))	7–1	Rio de Janeiro	São Paulo
	Formiga; Chico Netto (o.g.); Vidal (o.g.); Arnaldo; Amílcar; Dias		Couto	Stadium: Chácara da Floresta

19 Aug 1917 Friendly	Rio de Janeiro	3–3	(São Paulo (state)) São Paulo	Rio de Janeiro
	Couto; Benedicto; Chico Netto		Dias; Amílcar	Stadium: Estádio das Laranjeiras

12 Oct 1917 Friendly	Rio de Janeiro	5–1	Minas Gerais	Rio de Janeiro
	Laís; Nery; Araújo; Dutra		Goal	Stadium: Estádio das Laranjeiras

25 Dec 1917 Friendly	São Paulo (São Paulo (state))	9–1	Rio de Janeiro	São Paulo
	Friedenreich; Rodrigues; Dias; Neco		Welfare	Stadium: Chácara da Floresta

24 Jan 1918 Friendly	Rio de Janeiro	3–4	(Uruguay) Dublin	Rio de Janeiro
	Welfare 33', 67'; Spantanondas 77'		Marán; H. Scarone 30', 60', 86'	Stadium: General Severiano; Referee: A. Castro

3 Mar 1918 Friendly	Minas Gerais	1–3	Rio de Janeiro	Belo Horizonte
			Cantuária	Stadium: Prado Mineiro

2 Jun 1918 Friendly	São Paulo (São Paulo (state))	4–2	Rio de Janeiro	São Paulo
	Friedenreich; Mário de Andrade; Neco		Zezé	Stadium: Chácara da Floresta

4 Jul 1918 Friendly	Rio de Janeiro	4–3	(Brazil) America-RJ	Rio de Janeiro
	Santinho; Carregal; Menezes		Goal	Stadium: Estádio das Laranjeiras

7 Jul 1918 Friendly	Rio de Janeiro	2–1	(São Paulo (state)) São Paulo	Rio de Janeiro
	Zezé		Arnaldo	Stadium: Estádio das Laranjeiras

4 Aug 1918 Friendly	Rio de Janeiro	3–2	(São Paulo (state)) São Paulo	Rio de Janeiro
	Carregal; Welfare		Haroldo; Friedenreich	Stadium: Estádio das Laranjeiras

1 Sep 1918 Friendly	São Paulo (São Paulo (state))	8–1	Rio de Janeiro	São Paulo
	Vidal (o.g.); Friedenreich; Haroldo; Formiga; Neco		Welfare	Stadium: Chácara da Floresta

8 Sep 1918 Friendly	Rio de Janeiro	13–0	Minas Gerais	Rio de Janeiro
	Zezé; Welfare; Santinho; Machado; Carregal			Stadium: Estádio das Laranjeiras

13 Oct 1918 Friendly	São Paulo (São Paulo (state))	5–0	Rio de Janeiro	São Paulo
	Friedenreich; Américo; Neco; Haroldo			Stadium: Chácara da Floresta

15 Jun 1919 Taça Füchs	São Paulo (São Paulo (state))	3–1	Rio de Janeiro	São Paulo
	Friedenreich 43' (pen.), 69'; Neco 62'		Machado 27'	Stadium: Chácara da Floresta; Referee: Benedicto Montenegro

6 Jul 1919 Taça Rodrigues Alves	Rio de Janeiro	2–4	(São Paulo (state)) São Paulo	Rio de Janeiro
	Welfare 8'; Bacchi 24'		Neco 10', 12', 53'; Haroldo 76'	Stadium: Estádio das Laranjeiras; Referee: Ferreira Netto

10 Aug 1919 Taça Delfim Moreira	Minas Gerais	1–2	Rio de Janeiro	Belo Horizonte
	Fausto		Mano; Machado	Stadium: Prado Mineiro

12 Aug 1919 Friendly	América-MG (Brazil)	0–0	Rio de Janeiro	Belo Horizonte
				Stadium: Prado Mineiro

14 Sep 1919 Friendly	Rio de Janeiro	2–2	Minas Gerais	Rio de Janeiro
	Pastor; Braz		Goal	Stadium: Estádio das Laranjeiras

9 May 1920 Friendly	Minas Gerais	0–2	Rio de Janeiro	Belo Horizonte
			Goal	Stadium: Prado Mineiro

6 Jun 1920 Taça Rodrigues Alves	Rio de Janeiro	1–7	(São Paulo (state)) São Paulo	Rio de Janeiro
	Bacchi 12'		Friedenreich 25', 41', 49'; Andrada 32', 42'; Cassiano 79'; Formiga 80'	Stadium: Estádio das Laranjeiras; Referee: Henrique Boock

14 Jul 1920 Friendly	Rio de Janeiro	15–0	Minas Gerais	Rio de Janeiro
	Zezé 2', 21' (pen.), 53', 54'; Iracy 15', 63'; Carregal 23'; Junqueira 24', 33'; Fortes 26'; Welfare 37', 38', 48', 83', 88'			Stadium: Estádio das Laranjeiras

25 Jul 1920 Taça Rodrigues Alves	São Paulo (São Paulo (state))	2–2	Rio de Janeiro	São Paulo
	Neco 20'; Heitor 75'		Zezé 71'; Welfare 73'	Stadium: Chácara da Floresta; Referee: Carlos Santos

27 Jul 1922 Brasileiro de Seleções	Rio de Janeiro (DF)	2–0	(Rio de Janeiro (state)) Rio de Janeiro (RJ)	Rio de Janeiro
	Nilo			Stadium: Rua Paysandu

30 Jul 1922 Brasileiro de Seleções	Rio de Janeiro	2–2	Bahia	Rio de Janeiro
	Zezé		Manteiga; Pinima	Stadium: Rua Paysandu

5 Aug 1922 Brasileiro de Seleções	Rio de Janeiro	2–0	Rio Grande do Sul	Rio de Janeiro
	Zezé 38', 66'			Stadium: General Severiano

13 Aug 1922 Brasileiro de Seleções	São Paulo (São Paulo (state))	4–1	Rio de Janeiro	São Paulo
	Rodrigues 14'; Friedenreich 25' (pen.), 78'; Neco 37'		Brilhante 55'	Stadium: Parque Antártica; Referee: Pedro dos Santos

27 Aug 1922 Friendly	Rio de Janeiro	1–2	(São Paulo (state)) São Paulo	Rio de Janeiro
	Zezé 9'		Formiga 34'; Friedenreich 56'	Stadium: General Severiano; Referee: Antônio Zecchi

3 May 1923 Friendly	Rio de Janeiro (RJ) (Rio de Janeiro (state))	2–3	Rio de Janeiro (DF)	Niterói
	Newton 20'; Manoelzinho 64'		Zezé 28'; Coelho 50', 70'	Stadium: Rua Dr. March

2 Sep 1923 Friendly	Rio de Janeiro	0–7	(Brazil) Flamengo	Rio de Janeiro
			Nonô; Moderato; Junqueira; Galvão	Stadium: Rua Paysandu

9 Sep 1923 Taça Modesto Leal	Rio de Janeiro (DF)	1–3	(Rio de Janeiro (state)) Rio de Janeiro (RJ)	Rio de Janeiro
	Nilo		Bibino; Mário	Stadium: Rua Paysandu

7 Oct 1923 Brasileiro de Seleções	Rio de Janeiro (DF)	4–1	(Rio de Janeiro (state)) Rio de Janeiro (RJ)	Rio de Janeiro
	Junqueira; Coelho		Bibino	Stadium: Estádio das Laranjeiras; Referee: Álvaro Felicíssimo

21 Oct 1923 Brasileiro de Seleções	Rio de Janeiro	2–0	Bahia	Rio de Janeiro
	Fortes; Nilo			Stadium: Estádio das Laranjeiras; Referee: Antonio Carneiro

28 Oct 1923 Brasileiro de Seleções	Rio de Janeiro	0–4	(São Paulo (state)) São Paulo	Rio de Janeiro
			Tatú 16', 21', 23'; Feitiço 80'	Stadium: Estádio das Laranjeiras; Referee: Leite de Castro

9 Nov 1924 Friendly	Vasco da Gama (Brazil)	4–2	Rio de Janeiro	Rio de Janeiro
	Paschoal; Russinho; Torterolli		Hermogenes; Tele	Stadium: Barão de São Francisco; Referee: Eduardo Pinto da Fonseca

16 Nov 1924 Friendly	Rio de Janeiro	5–4	(Paraná (state)) Paraná	Rio de Janeiro
	Nilo 38', 70'; Lagarto 48', 63'; Coelho 68'		Faeco 7'; Marrequinho 22', 54', 80'	Stadium: Estádio das Laranjeiras; Referee: Ary Amarante

23 Nov 1924 Brasileiro de Seleções	Rio de Janeiro (DF)	8–3	(Rio de Janeiro (state)) Rio de Janeiro (RJ)	Rio de Janeiro
	Junqueira 6', 32'; Nilo 12', 30', 43', 46'		Congo 9', 59'; Manoel 49'	Stadium: Estádio das Laranjeiras; Referee: Mário Passerottti

14 Dec 1924 Brasileiro de Seleções	Rio de Janeiro	7–2	Bahia	Rio de Janeiro
	Lagarto 2', 6', 15', 42'; Nilo 12' (pen.); Nonô 26', 71'		Popo 70'; Gama 85'	Stadium: Estádio das Laranjeiras; Referee: Hugo Weingrill

21 Dec 1924 Brasileiro de Seleções	Rio de Janeiro	1–0	(São Paulo (state)) São Paulo	Rio de Janeiro
	Nilo 6'			Stadium: Estádio das Laranjeiras; Referee: Ary Amarante

19 Jul 1925 Brasileiro de Seleções	Rio de Janeiro	6–0	Espírito Santo	Rio de Janeiro
	Fortes 2', 82'; Candiota 18', 24'; Nilo 53', 59'			Stadium: Estádio das Laranjeiras; Referee: Affonso Magalhães

2 Aug 1925 Brasileiro de Seleções	Rio de Janeiro	3–0	Minas Gerais	Rio de Janeiro
	Nilo 25', 65'; Candiota 83'			Stadium: Estádio das Laranjeiras; Referee: Affonso Magalhães

6 Aug 1925 Friendly	Rio de Janeiro	1–1	(Brazil) Vasco da Gama	Rio de Janeiro
	Nonô		Russinho	Stadium: Estádio das Laranjeiras; Referee: Everaldo Tinoco

23 Aug 1925 Brasileiro de Seleções	Rio de Janeiro	2–0	Bahia	Rio de Janeiro
	Nonô 38'; Candiota 37'			Stadium: Estádio das Laranjeiras; Referee: Pedro Thomaz

30 Aug 1925 Friendly	Rio de Janeiro	2–0	Bahia	Rio de Janeiro
	Candiota; Nonô; Moderato			Stadium: Estádio das Laranjeiras; Referee: Jorte Py

13 Sep 1925 Brasileiro de Seleções	Rio de Janeiro	1–1 (a.e.t.)	(São Paulo (state)) São Paulo	Rio de Janeiro
	Nilo 83'		Neco 10'	Stadium: Estádio das Laranjeiras; Referee: Leite de Castro

20 Sep 1925 Brasileiro de Seleções	Rio de Janeiro	3–2	(São Paulo (state)) São Paulo	Rio de Janeiro
	Nilo 12'; Candiota 39'; Moderato 88'		Andrada 29'; Filó 73'	Stadium: Estádio das Laranjeiras; Referee: Leite de Castro

3 Oct 1926 Friendly	Rio de Janeiro	5–0	(Brazil) São Cristóvão	Rio de Janeiro
	Paschoal 14'; Ladislau 23'; Oswaldinho 29', 68'; Russinho 63'			Stadium: Estádio das Laranjeiras; Referee: Nélson Guimarães

10 Oct 1926 Brasileiro de Seleções	Rio de Janeiro	9–1	Minas Gerais	Rio de Janeiro
	Russinho; Ladislau; Paschoal; Oswaldinho; Nesi		Hélcio (o.g.)	Stadium: Estádio das Laranjeiras; Referee: Guilherme Abaurre

17 Oct 1926 Brasileiro de Seleções	Rio de Janeiro (DF)	5–1	(Rio de Janeiro (state)) Rio de Janeiro (RJ)	Rio de Janeiro
	Ladislau; Russinho; Oswaldinho		Poly	Stadium: Estádio das Laranjeiras; Referee: Joaquim de Almeida

31 Oct 1926 Brasileiro de Seleções	Rio de Janeiro	5–0	Pará	Rio de Janeiro
	Nonô; Russinho; Oswaldinho		Hélcio (o.g.)	Stadium: Estádio das Laranjeiras; Referee: Jayme Motta

7 Nov 1926 Brasileiro de Seleções	Rio de Janeiro	2–3	(São Paulo (state)) São Paulo	Rio de Janeiro
	Paschoal 31', 53'		Feitiço 22'; Petronilho de Brito 47'; Heitor 68'	Stadium: Estádio das Laranjeiras; Referee: Leite de Castro

28 Nov 1926 Friendly	São Paulo (São Paulo (state))	8–1	Rio de Janeiro	São Paulo
	Tedesco 5'; Petronilho de Brito 7', 26'; Feitiço 18', 73', 87'; Melle 15'; Neco 31'		Russinho 63'	Stadium: Parque Antártica; Referee: Everaldo Tinoco

2 Oct 1927 Brasileiro de Seleções	Rio de Janeiro	10–0	Ceará	Rio de Janeiro
	Nilo 5', 37', 50', 62', 83', 89'; Paschoal 20', 85'; Bahianinho 38'; Oswaldinho 82' (pen.)			Stadium: Estádio das Laranjeiras; Referee: Virgílio Fredrigh

23 Oct 1927 Brasileiro de Seleções	Rio de Janeiro	5–3	Minas Gerais	Rio de Janeiro
	Alfredinho; Nilo; Russinho		Castro; Ninão; Said	Stadium: São Januário; Referee: Joaquim de Almeida

6 Nov 1927 Brasileiro de Seleções	Rio de Janeiro	6–2	Rio Grande do Sul	Rio de Janeiro
	Oswaldinho 40', 85'; Nilo 48', 53', 56'; Bahianinho 88'		Paschoalito 36'; Luiz Carvalho 38'	Stadium: São Januário; Referee: Carlos da Rocha

12 Nov 1927 Brasileiro de Seleções	Rio de Janeiro	2–1	(São Paulo (state)) São Paulo	Rio de Janeiro
	Oswaldinho 35'; Fortes 58'		Feitiço 10'	Stadium: São Januário; Referee: Ary Amarante

15 Jan 1928 Friendly	São Paulo (São Paulo (state))	0–5	Rio de Janeiro	São Paulo
			Ennes; Pio; Renato; Sá; Doca	Stadium: Chácara da Floresta; Referee: Ancient Paiva

25 Mar 1928 Friendly	Rio de Janeiro	2–1	(Uruguay) Montevideo Wanderers	Rio de Janeiro
	Thomasini (o.g.); Oswaldinho		Conti	Stadium: São Januário; Referee: Edgard Gonçalves

25 Mar 1928 Taça Castelões	São Paulo (São Paulo (state))	9–1	Rio de Janeiro	São Paulo
	Friedenreich; Feitiço; Peres; Rueda		Bahianinho	Stadium: Chácara da Floresta; Referee: B. Ferramenta

21 Jun 1928 Friendly	Rio de Janeiro	1–1	(Scotland) Motherwell	Rio de Janeiro
	Oswaldinho 83'		Ferrier 76'	Stadium: Estádio das Laranjeiras; Referee: Alfonso de Castro

2 Aug 1928 Friendly	Rio de Janeiro	3–2	(Portugal) Sporting CP	Rio de Janeiro
	Moderato 4'; Oswaldinho 14'; Tele 47'		João Santos 73', 84'	Stadium: São Januário; Referee: Edgard Gonçalves

28 Aug 1928 Brasileiro de Seleções	Rio de Janeiro	3–0	Espírito Santo	Rio de Janeiro
	Russinho 14', 49'; Paschoal 69'			Stadium: Estádio das Laranjeiras; Referee: Hugo Nanghrill

30 Oct 1928 Friendly	Rio de Janeiro	1–2	(Brazil) Vasco da Gama	Rio de Janeiro
	Doca 10'		Russinho 15'; Hespanhol 78'	Stadium: Estádio das Laranjeiras; Referee: Fernando Gonçalves

11 Nov 1928 Brasileiro de Seleções	Rio de Janeiro (DF)	7–2	(Rio de Janeiro (state)) Rio de Janeiro (RJ)	Rio de Janeiro
	Russinho 15', 47', 77', 89'; Nilo 16', 84'; Fernando 20'		Manoel 30'; Lindório 34'	Stadium: Estádio das Laranjeiras; Referee: Edgard Gonçalves

2 Dec 1928 Brasileiro de Seleções	Rio de Janeiro	1–0	Bahia	Rio de Janeiro
	Russinho 12'			Stadium: São Januário; Referee: Edgard Gonçalves

9 Dec 1928 Brasileiro de Seleções	Rio de Janeiro	5–1	(Paraná (state)) Paraná	Rio de Janeiro
	Rogério 13', 48', 59'; Nilo 30', 84'		Stacco 18'	Stadium: São Januário; Referee: Edgard Gonçalves

1 Jan 1929 Friendly	Rio de Janeiro	2–3	(Argentina) Sportivo Barracas	Rio de Janeiro
	Rogério 31'; Benedicto 77'		Marino 12', 18'; Luna 83'	Stadium: São Januário; Referee: Fernando Gonçalves

20 Jan 1929 Friendly	São Paulo (São Paulo (state))	6–2	Rio de Janeiro	São Paulo
	Pedrinho; Friedenreich; Pixo		Bahianinho; Mica	Stadium: Campo do Independência; Referee: Sylvio Vinhas

17 Feb 1929 Friendly	Rio de Janeiro	1–4	(Uruguay) Rampla Juniors	Rio de Janeiro
	Bahianinho 42'		Fedullo 8'; Carballal 60'; Häberli 71'; Labraga 75'	Stadium: São Januário; Referee: Gilberto Rego

3 Mar 1929 Friendly	Rio de Janeiro	3–2	(São Paulo (state)) São Paulo	Rio de Janeiro
	Mimi Sodré 26', 52'; Tainha 40'		Mathias 40'; Sorrentino 48'	Stadium: São Januário; Referee: João Caetano Baptista

26 Mar 1929 Friendly	Rio de Janeiro	4–3	(Brazil) America-RJ	Rio de Janeiro
	Benedicto; Luiz Carvalho; Teóphilo		Benevenuto (o.g.); Mineiro; Nilo	Stadium: São Januário; Referee: Arthur de Moraes

3 May 1929 Friendly	São Paulo (São Paulo (state))	4–1	Rio de Janeiro	São Paulo
	Friedenreich 63', 75', 86'; Filó 80'		Ennes 25'	Stadium: Estádio da Ponte Grande; Referee: Oscar Coelho

5 May 1929 Friendly	Comercial (Brazil)	2–1	Rio de Janeiro	Ribeirão Preto
	Maia 7', 69'		Careca 35'	Stadium: Rua Tibiriçá; Referee: Romeu Dias Pinto

20 Jun 1929 Friendly	Rio de Janeiro	3–1	(Uruguay) Rampla Juniors	Rio de Janeiro
	Fernando 39'; Hespanhol 75' (pen.); Ripper 80'		Carballal 59'	Stadium: São Januário; Referee: Cyro Werneck

23 Jun 1929 Friendly	Rio de Janeiro	4–3	(São Paulo (state)) São Paulo	Rio de Janeiro
	Careca; Pinho; Ennes; Coruja		Filó; Friedenreich	Stadium: Rua José Patrocínio; Referee: Edmundo Amorim

28 Jun 1929 Friendly	Rio de Janeiro	1–1	(England) Chelsea	Rio de Janeiro
	Ripper 81'		W. Jackson 41'	Stadium: Estádio das Laranjeiras; Referee: Arthur de Moraes

30 Jun 1929 Friendly	Rio de Janeiro	2–1	(England) Chelsea	Rio de Janeiro
	Nilo 32'; Teóphilo 46'		Ferguson 42'	Stadium: Estádio das Laranjeiras; Referee: Affonso de Castro

7 Jul 1929 Friendly	Rio de Janeiro	3–3	(Hungary) Ferencváros	Rio de Janeiro
	Teóphilo 51'; Ripper 69'; Russinho 83'		Takacs 13'; Toldi 15'; Turay 22'	Stadium: Estádio das Laranjeiras; Referee: Affonso de Castro

25 Jul 1929 Friendly	Rio de Janeiro	3–1	(Italy) Bologna	Rio de Janeiro
	Luiz Carvalho 25'; Nilo 56'; Oswaldinho 84'		Muzziolli 13'	Stadium: Estádio das Laranjeiras; Referee: Cyro Werneck

21 Aug 1929 Friendly	Rio de Janeiro	4–0	(Portugal) Vitória de Setúbal	Rio de Janeiro
	Ripper 22'; Bahianinho 30', 36'; Nilo 58'			Stadium: São Januário; Referee: Eduardo Pinto da Fonseca

28 Aug 1929 Friendly	Rio de Janeiro	3–1	(Portugal) Vitória de Setúbal	Rio de Janeiro
	Benedicto 2'; Preguinho 52', 87'		A. Martins 30'	Stadium: São Januário; Referee: Gilberto Rego

7 Sep 1929 Friendly	Rio de Janeiro	6–0	(Italy) Torino	Rio de Janeiro
	Nilo 17'; Russinho 18', 22'; Oswaldinho 28', 42', 83'			Stadium: São Januário; Referee: Gilberto Rego

8 Sep 1929 Friendly	São Paulo (São Paulo (state))	2–0	Rio de Janeiro	São Paulo
	De Maria 11', 57'			Stadium: Parque São Jorge; Referee: Ary Amarante

10 Sep 1929 Friendly	Rio de Janeiro	2–1	(Italy) Torino	Rio de Janeiro
	Ladislau 52'; Tinduca 56'		Chini 41'	Stadium: São Januário; Referee: Jayme Barcelos

14 Sep 1929 Friendly	Rio de Janeiro	3–1	(Italy) Bologna	Rio de Janeiro
	Celso 24'; Ladislau 42'; Russinho 63'		Constantino 14'	Stadium: Estádio das Laranjeiras; Referee: Flávio Pinto Duarte

13 Oct 1929 Taça Júlio Prestes	São Paulo (São Paulo (state))	5–3	Rio de Janeiro	São Paulo
	Dendi; Araken; Friedenreich		Ernani; Pinho; Barthô (o.g.)	Stadium: Estádio da Ponte Grande; Referee: Oscar Bastos Coelho

17 Nov 1929 Brasileiro de Seleções	Rio de Janeiro (DF)	5–3	(Rio de Janeiro (state)) Rio de Janeiro (RJ)	Rio de Janeiro
	Oswaldinho 6', 80'; Russinho 21', 71'; Paschoal 54'		Poly 14'; Russo 53'; Lindório 86'	Stadium: Estádio das Laranjeiras; Referee: Edgard Vieira

20 Nov 1929 Brasileiro de Seleções	Rio de Janeiro	6–2	Rio Grande do Sul	Rio de Janeiro
	Ladislau 11' (pen.), 85'; Gradim 50'; Bahianinho 52', 54', 84'		Benedicto 16' (pen.); João 76'	Stadium: Estádio das Laranjeiras; Referee: Oswaldo Kropf

26 Nov 1929 Brasileiro de Seleções	Rio de Janeiro	7–2	Pernambuco	Rio de Janeiro
	Russinho 32'; Nilo 37', 73'; Oswaldinho 39', 40', 57', 60'		Hermes 31'; Jubal 66'	Stadium: Estádio das Laranjeiras; Referee: Gilberto Rego

1 Dec 1929 Brasileiro de Seleções	Rio de Janeiro	9–2	Pará	Rio de Janeiro
	Nilo 5', 7', 59', 75'; Russinho 42', 45', 88'; Oswaldinho 61' (pen.); Paschoal 90'		Barradas 19', 50'	Stadium: Estádio das Laranjeiras; Referee: José Antunes

8 Dec 1929 Brasileiro de Seleções	Rio de Janeiro	1–4	(São Paulo (state)) São Paulo	Rio de Janeiro
	Russinho 19'		Petronilho de Brito 9'; De Maria 11'; Feitiço 15', 88'	Stadium: Estádio das Laranjeiras; Referee: William Rowlands

22 Dec 1929 Brasileiro de Seleções	São Paulo (São Paulo (state))	3–3 (a.e.t.)	Rio de Janeiro	São Paulo
	Petronilho de Brito 10', 71'; Tinoco 43' (o.g.)		Russinho 19', 51' (pen.), 61'	Stadium: Parque Antártica; Referee: Carlos Rocha

29 Dec 1929 Brasileiro de Seleções	Rio de Janeiro	3–1	(São Paulo (state)) São Paulo	Rio de Janeiro
	Doca 1'; Russinho 33'; Paschoal 85'		Gambinha 28'	Stadium: Estádio das Laranjeiras; Referee: Alzemiro Ballio

5 Jan 1930 Friendly	Rio de Janeiro	3–2	(Argentina) Liga Tucumana	Rio de Janeiro
	Russinho; Nilo; Paschoal		Maidana; Itália (o.g.)	Stadium: São Januário; Referee: Jorge Marinho

12 Jan 1930 Brasileiro de Seleções	São Paulo (São Paulo (state))	4–2	Rio de Janeiro	São Paulo
	Gambinha 29'; De Maria 38', 55'; Heitor 46'		Russinho 51', 90'	Stadium: Parque São Jorge; Referee: Carlos Rocha

23 Jan 1930 Friendly	Rio de Janeiro	3–3	(Argentina) Liga Tucumana	Rio de Janeiro
	Benedicto; Sobral; Gradim		Rivarola; Maidana	Stadium: Campos Sales; Referee: Homero Arcury

30 Jan 1930 Friendly	Vasco da Gama (Brazil)	4–3	Rio de Janeiro	Rio de Janeiro
	Russinho; Paschoal; Sant'Anna		Ripper; Gradim	Stadium: São Januário; Referee: Carlos Rocha

27 Mar 1930 Friendly	Rio de Janeiro	5–2	(Argentina) Sportivo Buenos Aires	Rio de Janeiro
	Bahianinho; Doca; Paschoal; Teóphilo		Arrillaga; Larroca	Stadium: São Januário; Referee: Arthur de Moraes

30 Mar 1930 Friendly	Rio de Janeiro	1–4	(Brazil) Vasco da Gama	Rio de Janeiro
	Doca		Silvio (o.g.); Baduzinho; Bahianinho; Fausto	Stadium: Estádio das Laranjeiras; Referee: Jorge Marinho

22 Jun 1930 Friendly	Rio de Janeiro	2–0	(United States) New York Hakoah	Rio de Janeiro
	Ladislau 26'; Paschoal 48'			Stadium: São Januário; Referee: Diogo Rangel

27 Jul 1930 Friendly	Rio de Janeiro	2–2	(Argentina) Huracán	Rio de Janeiro
	Sobral 15'; Gradim 80'		Federici 50'; Chiesa 55'	Stadium: São Januário; Referee: Juan Scurzoni (ARG)

3 Aug 1930 Taça São Januário	Rio de Janeiro	4–4	(Argentina) Huracán	Rio de Janeiro
	Carlos Paes 13'; Alfredinho 28'; Jaburu 63'; Bahianinho 75'		Chiesa 27', 29'; Onzari 30'; Ferreyra 84' (pen.)	Stadium: São Januário; Referee: Alderico Solon

15 Mar 1931 Friendly	Rio de Janeiro	0–3	(Uruguay) Sud América	Rio de Janeiro
			Lema 4'; Dendi 10'; Portugal 79'	Stadium: São Januário; Referee: Virgílio Fredrigh

22 Mar 1931 Friendly	Rio de Janeiro	3–2	(Uruguay) Sud América	Rio de Janeiro
	Nilo 25'; Carvalho Leite 35', 85'		Dendi 31'; Iturbide 78'	Stadium: São Januário; Referee: Rubem Portocarrero

6 Apr 1931 Friendly	Rio de Janeiro	6–1	(São Paulo (state)) São Paulo	Rio de Janeiro
	Carvalho Leite 10', 37', 58', 60', 65'; Teóphilo 47'		De Maria 50'	Stadium: Estádio das Laranjeiras; Referee: Carlos Rocha

16 Apr 1931 Friendly	Rio de Janeiro	2–1	(Uruguay) Bella Vista	Rio de Janeiro
	Nilo 6'; Fernando 22' (pen.)		Castro 60'	Stadium: São Januário; Referee: Virgílio Fredrigh

28 Apr 1931 Friendly	Rio de Janeiro	2–1	(Uruguay) Bella Vista	Rio de Janeiro
	Nilo 34'; Bahianinho 75' (pen.)		Carbone 15'	Stadium: São Januário; Referee: Virgílio Fredrigh

25 Jun 1931 Friendly	Rio de Janeiro	3–1	(Hungary) Ferencváros	Rio de Janeiro
	Alfredinho 6'; Miro 41', 47'		Hildegardo 65' (o.g.)	Stadium: Estádio das Laranjeiras; Referee: Oswaldo Kroft

28 Jun 1931 Friendly	Rio de Janeiro	2–2	(Hungary) Ferencváros	Rio de Janeiro
	Leônidas 3'; Ripper 6'		Toldi 16'; J. Takács 85'	Stadium: Estádio das Laranjeiras; Referee: Jorge Marinho

27 Jul 1931 Brasileiro de Seleções	Rio de Janeiro	5–0	Minas Gerais	Rio de Janeiro
	Ripper; Preguinho			Stadium: Estádio das Laranjeiras; Referee: Domingos Olmo

2 Aug 1931 Friendly	Rio de Janeiro	6–1	(Brazil) Petrópolis XI	Rio de Janeiro
	China; Leônidas; Alfredinho		Arroz	Stadium: Estádio das Laranjeiras; Referee: Mario Silva

2 Aug 1931 Friendly	Rio de Janeiro (DF)	6–0	(Rio de Janeiro (state)) Rio de Janeiro (RJ)	Rio de Janeiro
	Wálter; Coelho; Teóphilo			Stadium: Estádio das Laranjeiras; Referee: Ramos Nogueira

16 Aug 1931 Brasileiro de Seleções	Rio de Janeiro	6–0	Bahia	Rio de Janeiro
	Preguinho 30', 54', 76'; Wálter 55', 64'; Coelho 70'			Stadium: Estádio das Laranjeiras; Referee: Carlos Rocha

23 Aug 1931 Brasileiro de Seleções	Rio de Janeiro	3–1	(São Paulo (state)) São Paulo	Rio de Janeiro
	Teóphilo 17'; Wálter 50'; Russinho 85'		Petronilho de Brito 30'	Stadium: São Januário; Referee: Domingos Olmo

30 Aug 1931 Brasileiro de Seleções	São Paulo (São Paulo (state))	3–0	Rio de Janeiro	São Paulo
	Feitiço 2'; Friedenreich 63', 75'			Stadium: Parque São Jorge; Referee: Virgílio Fredrigh

13 Sep 1931 Brasileiro de Seleções	Rio de Janeiro	3–0	(São Paulo (state)) São Paulo	Rio de Janeiro
	Leônidas 5', 80'; Carvalho Leite 15'			Stadium: São Januário; Referee: Virgílio Fredrigh

4 March 1932 Friendly	Santos XI (Brazil)	2–2	Rio de Janeiro	Santos
	Bonelli 23'; Feitiço 50'		Carvalho Leite 40'; Almeida 54'	Stadium: Vila Belmiro; Referee: Alarico Maciel

6 March 1932 Friendly	Santos FC (Brazil)	2–4	Rio de Janeiro	Santos
	Alfredo 6'; Vitor Gonçalves 49'		Almeida 24'; Jarbas 46'; Carola 55'; Leônidas 87'	Stadium: Vila Belmiro; Referee: Alarico Maciel

8 March 1932 Friendly	Santos FC (Brazil)	1–1	Rio de Janeiro	Santos
	Seixas 2'		Carvalho Leite 89' (pen.)	Stadium: Vila Belmiro; Referee: Alzemiro Ballio

20 Mar 1932 Friendly	Rio de Janeiro	1–2	(Uruguay) Montevideo Wanderers	Rio de Janeiro
	Nilo 43'		Rossi 46'; Rodriguez 68'	Stadium: Estádio das Laranjeiras; Referee: Virgílio Fredrigh

22 Jul 1932 Friendly	São Paulo (São Paulo (state))	1–2	Rio de Janeiro	São Paulo
	Luisinho 32'		Carvalho Leite 23'; Junqueira (o.g.)	Stadium: Chácara da Floresta; Referee: Alderico Solon

5 Jul 1932 Friendly	Rio de Janeiro	2–3	(São Paulo (state)) São Paulo	Rio de Janeiro
	Ivan 35'; Nilo 53'		Imparato 5'; Romeu 16' (pen.); Luisinho 19'	Stadium: Estádio das Laranjeiras; Referee: Theóphilo Osses

9 Apr 1933 Friendly	Rio de Janeiro	2–2	(São Paulo (state)) São Paulo	Rio de Janeiro
	Carnieri; Orlando		Itália (o.g.); Romeu	Stadium: São Januário; Referee: Arthur Friedenreich

23 Apr 1933 Friendly	São Paulo (São Paulo (state))	3–1	Rio de Janeiro	São Paulo
	Feitiço 27'; Imparato 76'; Mendes 85'		Said 6'	Stadium: Parque São Jorge; Referee: Haroldo Dias

11 Oct 1933 Friendly	Rio de Janeiro	2–0	(São Paulo (state)) São Paulo	Rio de Janeiro
	Preguinho 11'; Gradim 63'			Stadium: Estádio das Laranjeiras; Referee: Arthur Friedenreich

17 Dec 1933 Brasileiro de Seleções (FBF)	Rio de Janeiro	6–1	Minas Gerais	Rio de Janeiro
	Preguinho; Jarbas; Álvaro; Gradim; Tião		Bernardino	Stadium: Estádio das Laranjeiras; Referee: Arthur Friedenreich

31 Dec 1933 Brasileiro de Seleções (FBF)	São Paulo (São Paulo (state))	2–1 (a.e.t.)	Rio de Janeiro	São Paulo
	Waldemar de Brito 12'; Luisinho 91'		Gradim 59'	Stadium: Parque Antártica; Referee: Aníbal Tejada (URU)

7 Jan 1934 Brasileiro de Seleções (FBF)	Rio de Janeiro	1–2 (a.e.t.)	(São Paulo (state)) São Paulo	Rio de Janeiro
	Gradim 6'		Zarzur 38'; Hércules 94'	Stadium: São Januário; Referee: Aníbal Tejada (URU)

7 Jan 1934 Brasileiro de Seleções (CDB)	Rio de Janeiro (RJ) (Rio de Janeiro (state))	3–5	Rio de Janeiro (DF)	Niterói
	Antônio; Jayme; Calao		Pirica; Carvalho Leite; Paschoal	Stadium: Rua Dr. Paulo César; Referee: Sebastião Cesário

28 Jan 1934 Brasileiro de Seleções (CDB)	Rio de Janeiro	4–5	Espírito Santo	Rio de Janeiro
	Jayme; Afonso; Nilo		Lizador; Ilcino; Alcy; Elzéquio	Stadium: General Severiano; Referee: Carlos Rocha

5 Jul 1934 Friendly	Rio de Janeiro	1–0	(São Paulo (state)) São Paulo	Rio de Janeiro
	Russo 50'			Stadium: São Januário; Referee: Arthur Friedenreich

15 Jul 1934 Friendly	São Paulo (São Paulo (state))	1–3	Rio de Janeiro	São Paulo
	Romeu 30'		Gradim 11'; Nena 73', 78'	Stadium: Parque Antártica; Referee: Arthur Friedenreich

2 Sep 1934 Friendly	Rio de Janeiro	0–1	(Brazil) Vasco da Gama	Rio de Janeiro
			Almir	Stadium: Estádio das Laranjeiras; Referee: Oswaldo Kroft

28 Oct 1934 Brasileiro de Seleções (FBF)	Rio de Janeiro	3–1	Minas Gerais	Rio de Janeiro
	Nena; Sobral		Bernardino	Stadium: Estádio das Laranjeiras; Referee: Heitor Marcelino Domingues

11 Nov 1934 Brasileiro de Seleções (FBF)	Rio de Janeiro	2–0	(São Paulo (state)) São Paulo	Rio de Janeiro
	Nena 39'; Gradim 85'			Stadium: São Januário; Referee: Alzemiro Ballio

15 Nov 1934 Brasileiro de Seleções (FBF)	São Paulo (São Paulo (state))	2–1	Rio de Janeiro	São Paulo
	Mendes 22' (pen.); Romeu 77'		Nena 79'	Stadium: Parque Antártica; Referee: Lóris Valdetaro Cordovil

18 Nov 1934 Brasileiro de Seleções (FBF)	Rio de Janeiro	1–3	(São Paulo (state)) São Paulo	Rio de Janeiro
	Nena 42'		Mendes 10', 22', 80' (pen.)	Stadium: Estádio das Laranjeiras; Referee: Edgard Marques

31 Mar 1935 Brasileiro de Seleções (CDB)	Rio de Janeiro	9–2	Bahia	Rio de Janeiro
	Carvalho Leite; Orlando; Carreiro; Nena; Ladislau		Romeu	Stadium: Estádio Figueira de Melo; Referee: Lóris Cordovil

7 Apr 1935 Brasileiro de Seleções (CBD)	Rio de Janeiro	5–2	(São Paulo (state)) São Paulo	Rio de Janeiro
	Carreiro 15', 18', 81'; Carvalho Leite 33', 89'		Mendes 72' (pen.); Romeu 82'	Stadium: São Januário; Referee: José Alexandrino

14 Apr 1935 Brasileiro de Seleções (CBD)	São Paulo (São Paulo (state))	3–2	Rio de Janeiro	São Paulo
	Mendes 30'; Imparato 44', 79'		Carreiro 8'; Nena 74'	Stadium: Chácara da Floresta; Referee: Alderico Solon

5 May 1935 Brasileiro de Seleções (CBD)	Rio de Janeiro	2–1	(São Paulo (state)) São Paulo	Rio de Janeiro
	Nena 10', 47'		Romeu 59' (pen.)	Stadium: São Januário; Referee: Heitor Marcelino Domingues

17 Nov 1935 Friendly	America-RJ (Brazil)	1–3	Rio de Janeiro	Rio de Janeiro
	Plácido		China; Sá	Stadium: Campos Sales; Referee: Mota Sousa

24 Nov 1935 Brasileiro de Seleções (CDB)	Rio de Janeiro	3–1	Espírito Santo	Rio de Janeiro
	Sá		Alcy	Stadium: Campos Sales; Referee: Lopes de Almeida

1 Dec 1935 Brasileiro de Seleções (CDB)	Rio de Janeiro	3–1 (a.e.t.)	(Paraná (state)) Paraná	Rio de Janeiro
	Sá; Caldeira		Pizzatino	Stadium: Estádio das Laranjeiras; Referee: Manuel Nunes

15 Dec 1935 Brasileiro de Seleções (FBF)	Rio de Janeiro	5–1	(São Paulo (state)) São Paulo	Rio de Janeiro
	Hércules; Plácido		Barros	Stadium: Estádio das Laranjeiras; Referee: Guilherme Gomes

15 Dec 1935 Friendly	São Paulo (São Paulo (state))	8–5	Rio de Janeiro	São Paulo
	Luisinho 21'; Mathias 40' (pen.); Araken 46', 58', 78'; Sacy 52'; Teleco 60'; Tuffy 66'		Gradim 7', 28', 84'; Russinho 67'; Kuko 88'	Stadium: Parque Antártica; Referee: Lóris Cordovil

22 Dec 1935 Brasileiro de Seleções (FBF)	São Paulo (São Paulo (state))	2–3	Rio de Janeiro	São Paulo
	Russo 8' (o.g.); Fiorotti 35'		Bahianinho 50'; Plácido 74'; Hércules 88'	Stadium: Parque Antártica; Referee: Manuel Nunes

22 Dec 1935 Friendly	Rio de Janeiro	4–1	(São Paulo (state)) São Paulo	Rio de Janeiro
	Orlando; Leônidas; Patesko		Sacy	Stadium: São Januário; Referee: Heitor Marcelino Domingues

29 Dec 1935 Friendly	Minas Gerais	5–2	Rio de Janeiro	Belo Horizonte
	Bernardino; Guará		Mamede; Plácido	Stadium: Alameda; Referee: Abílio Lopes

10 May 1936 Brasileiro de Seleções	Rio de Janeiro	3–2	Minas Gerais	Rio de Janeiro
	Luiz Carvalho; Nena; Roberto		Bernardino	Stadium: São Januário; Referee: Heitor Marcelino Domingues

17 May 1936 Brasileiro de Seleções	Rio de Janeiro	6–1	Pará	Rio de Janeiro
	Barradas (o.g.); Leônidas; Luiz Carvalho; Carvalho Leite		Heitor	Stadium: São Januário; Referee: Alderico Solon

21 May 1936 Friendly	Rio de Janeiro	5–2	Pará	Rio de Janeiro
	Patesko; Feitiço; Leônidas		Rui; Quarenta	Stadium: Estádio Figueira de Melo; Referee: Alderico Solon

7 Jun 1936 Brasileiro de Seleções	Rio Grande do Sul	3–3 (a.e.t.)	Rio de Janeiro	Porto Alegre
	Foguinho; Casaca; Russinho		Feitiço; Carvalho Leite; Zarzur 38'	Stadium: Timbaúva; Referee: Alderico Solon

14 Jul 1936 Brasileiro de Seleções	Rio Grande do Sul	3–2	Rio de Janeiro	Porto Alegre
	Russinho 4', 54'; Foguinho 42'		Carvalho Leite 18'; Leônidas 48'	Stadium: Estádio dos Eucaliptos; Referee: Henrique Faillace

21 Jul 1936 Brasileiro de Seleções	Rio Grande do Sul	2–2	Rio de Janeiro	Porto Alegre
	Cardeal 40'; Casaca 52'		Carvalho Leite 47'; Feitiço 65'	Stadium: Estádio dos Eucaliptos; Referee: Henrique Faillace

28 Jul 1936 Friendly	Brasil de Pelotas (Brazil)	3–4	Rio de Janeiro	Pelotas
	Primo; Theotônio; Bicho		Leônidas; Carvalho Leite; Carreiro	Stadium: Praça dos Bancários; Referee: Alderico Solon

15 Oct 1936 Friendly	Rio de Janeiro	2–2	(Argentina) Vélez Sarsfield	Rio de Janeiro
	Carvalho Leite 17', 58'		Cosso 66'; Dedovich 83'	Stadium: Estádio Figueira de Melo; Referee: Lóris Cordovil

26 Nov 1936 Friendly	Minas Gerais	4–1	Rio de Janeiro	Belo Horizonte
	Niginho; Lello		Carvalho Leite	Stadium: Alameda; Referee: Virgílio Fredrigh

1 Dec 1936 Friendly	São Paulo (São Paulo (state))	2–1	Rio de Janeiro	Santos
	Teleco 13'; Mathias 38'		Carreiro 52'	Stadium: Vila Belmiro; Referee: Carlos Monteiro

6 Jan 1937 Friendly	Rio de Janeiro	3–5	(Brazil) Fluminense	Rio de Janeiro
	Leônidas 57'; Plácido 65'; Ayrton 70'		Hércules 9', 49', 75' (pen.); Brant 82'; Vicentino 85'	Stadium: Campos Sales; Referee: Carlos Monteiro

29 Jan 1939 Brasileiro de Seleções	Rio de Janeiro	3–1	Minas Gerais	Rio de Janeiro
	Romeu 12'; Carreiro 44' (pen.); Adílson 62'		Caieiras 18'	Stadium: General Severiano; Referee: José Lemos

1 Fev 1939 Brasileiro de Seleções	Rio de Janeiro	9–2	Pernambuco	Rio de Janeiro
	Valdemar 19', 30'; Sá 25', 50', 72'; Jarbas 30'; Romeu 42', 88'; Perácio 87'		Sidinho 7'; Carvalheira 21'	Stadium: Campos Sales; Referee: José Lemos

8 Feb 1939 Brasileiro de Seleções	São Paulo (São Paulo (state))	4–2	Rio de Janeiro	São Paulo
	Armandinho 6'; Teleco 15', 60'; Araken 38'		Valdemar 9'; Carreiro 50'	Stadium: Parque Antártica; Referee: Mário Vianna

12 Feb 1939 Brasileiro de Seleções	Rio de Janeiro	3–1	(São Paulo (state)) São Paulo	Rio de Janeiro
	Carreiro 18'; Romeu 32'; Carvalho Leite 86'		Araken 25'	Stadium: São Januário; Referee: Arthur Cidrin

15 Feb 1939 Brasileiro de Seleções	Rio de Janeiro	0–0	(São Paulo (state)) São Paulo	Rio de Janeiro
				Stadium: São Januário; Referee: Victor Ferreira

10 Mar 1939 Brasileiro de Seleções	São Paulo (São Paulo (state))	1–3	Rio de Janeiro	São Paulo
	Teleco 17'		Sá 55'; Carvalho Leite 74', 80'	Stadium: Parque Antártica; Referee: Mário Vianna

6 Dec 1939 Brasileiro de Seleções	Rio de Janeiro	5–2	Minas Gerais	Rio de Janeiro
	Carreiro 6', 64', 72'; Romeu 40'; Roberto 74'		Niginho 25', 54'	Stadium: Estádio das Laranjeiras; Referee: Antenor Ávila

10 Dec 1939 Brasileiro de Seleções	Rio de Janeiro	4–1	Pernambuco	Rio de Janeiro
	Tim 17', 31'; Carreiro 77'; Roberto 82'		Jango 47'	Stadium: Estádio das Laranjeiras; Referee: José Lemos

14 Dec 1939 Brasileiro de Seleções	Rio de Janeiro	5–1	(São Paulo (state)) São Paulo	Rio de Janeiro
	Carvalho Leite 13', 71'; Carreiro 15', 63'; Romeu 54'		Teleco 40'	Stadium: São Januário; Referee: Carlos Monteiro

17 Dec 1939 Brasileiro de Seleções	São Paulo (São Paulo (state))	3–2	Rio de Janeiro	São Paulo
	Servílio 9'; Teleco 12', 37'		Romeu 67'; Og Moreira 87'	Stadium: Parque Antártica; Referee: Antenor Ávila

23 Dec 1939 Brasileiro de Seleções	Rio de Janeiro	4–1	(São Paulo (state)) São Paulo	Rio de Janeiro
	Romeu 31'; Carvalho Leite 40'; Carreiro 70', 80'		Teleco 32'	Stadium: São Januário; Referee: Ari Luna

29 Dec 1940 Brasileiro de Seleções	Rio de Janeiro (DF)	6–1	(Rio de Janeiro (state)) Rio de Janeiro (RJ)	Rio de Janeiro
	Zizinho 18'; Jair 51', 69'; Isaías 53', 80'; Carreiro 63'		Dozinho 59'	Stadium: General Severiano; Referee: José Lemos

5 Jan 1941 Brasileiro de Seleções	Rio de Janeiro	6–1	Espírito Santo	Rio de Janeiro
	Isaías 29'; Jair 37'; Adílson 43'; Zizinho 46'; Zarzur 69'; Nelsinho 81'		Murilinho 50'	Stadium: Estádio das Laranjeiras; Referee: Guilherme Gomes

11 Jan 1941 Brasileiro de Seleções	São Paulo (São Paulo (state))	3–1	Rio de Janeiro	São Paulo
	Carvalho Leite 33'; Lima 38'; Luisinho 53'		Adílson 72'	Stadium: Estádio do Pacaembu; Referee: Mariano Carneiro

15 Jan 1941 Brasileiro de Seleções	Rio de Janeiro	4–0	(São Paulo (state)) São Paulo	Rio de Janeiro
	Leônidas 3', 59'; Zizinho 31'; Afonsinho 43'			Stadium: Estádio das Laranjeiras; Referee: Mário Vianna

20 Jan 1941 Brasileiro de Seleções	São Paulo (São Paulo (state))	2–2	Rio de Janeiro	São Paulo
	Luisinho 41', 66'		Zizinho 4'; Adílson 39'	Stadium: Estádio do Pacaembu; Referee: Mário Vianna

28 May 1941 Friendly	Rio de Janeiro	6–5	(São Paulo (state)) São Paulo	Rio de Janeiro
	Amorim 6', 36'; Alberto 17' (o.g.); Hércules 22'; Pirillo 55', 58'		Capelozi 51', 83'; Cláudio 62'; Teixeirinha 64'; Echevarrieta 76'	Stadium: Estádio das Laranjeiras; Referee: Mário Vianna

4 Jun 1941 Friendly	São Paulo (São Paulo (state))	3–0	Rio de Janeiro	São Paulo
	Capelozi 16'; Teixeirinha 77'; Lima 86'			Stadium: Estádio do Pacaembu; Referee: José Alexandrino

29 Nov 1941 Brasileiro de Seleçõs	Rio de Janeiro	9–0	Bahia	Rio de Janeiro
	Tim 3', 6'; Pirillo 14', 48', 84'; Amorim 22', 23', 74'; Patesko 59'			Stadium: General Severiano; Referee: José Lemos

4 Dec 1941 Brasileiro de Seleçõs	Rio de Janeiro	3–0	Bahia	Rio de Janeiro
	Pirillo 12', 58', 63'			Stadium: Estádio das Laranjeiras; Referee: José Lemos

10 Dec 1941 Brasileiro de Seleções	São Paulo (São Paulo (state))	4–2	Rio de Janeiro	São Paulo
	Cláudio 7'; Pipi 12', 30'; Milani 85'		Pirillo 59'; Geninho 87'	Stadium: Estádio do Pacaembu; Referee: Heitor Marcelino Domingues

14 Dec 1941 Brasileiro de Seleções	Rio de Janeiro	4–3	(São Paulo (state)) São Paulo	Rio de Janeiro
	Pirillo 12', 40'; Tim 60'; Lelé 67'		Servílio 16'; Milani 28', 54' (pen.)	Stadium: São Januário; Referee: Mário Vianna

17 Dec 1941 Brasileiro de Seleções	Rio de Janeiro	0–1	(São Paulo (state)) São Paulo	Rio de Janeiro
			Lima 48'	Stadium: São Januário; Referee: Mário Vianna

25 Nov 1942 Brasileiro de Seleções	Rio de Janeiro	3–0	Rio Grande do Sul	Rio de Janeiro
	Jair 12'; Vevé 22', 56'			Stadium: Estádio das Laranjeiras; Referee: Mário Vianna

29 Nov 1942 Brasileiro de Seleções	Rio de Janeiro	6–1	Rio Grande do Sul	Rio de Janeiro
	Pirillo 25', 46', 51'; Jair 12'; Lelé 52', 60', 67'		Carlitos 50'	Stadium: General Severiano; Referee: Mário Vianna

5 Dec 1942 Brasileiro de Seleções	São Paulo (São Paulo (state))	3–1	Rio de Janeiro	São Paulo
	Milani 5' (pen.), 75' (pen.); Servílio 17'		Amorim 88' (pen.)	Stadium: Estádio do Pacaembu; Referee: Pausanias Pinto da Rocha

10 Dec 1942 Brasileiro de Seleções	Rio de Janeiro	1–0	(São Paulo (state)) São Paulo	Rio de Janeiro
	Zizinho 80'			Stadium: São Januário; Referee: Mário Vianna

15 Dec 1942 Brasileiro de Seleções	São Paulo (São Paulo (state))	3–3	Rio de Janeiro	São Paulo
	Milani 43', 44'; Servílio 68'		Pirillo 28'; Lelé 50'; Zarzur 89'	Stadium: Estádio do Pacaembu; Referee: Francisco Trindade

20 Dec 1942 Brasileiro de Seleções	Rio de Janeiro	3–4	(São Paulo (state)) São Paulo	Rio de Janeiro
	Vevé 22', 65'; Amorim 28'		Milani 9'; Lima 71', 84'; Cláudio 76'	Stadium: São Januário; Referee: Francisco Trindade

17 Oct 1943 Friendly	Rio de Janeiro	0–2	(Brazil) Flamengo	Rio de Janeiro
			Perácio; Modesto	Stadium: São Januário; Referee: Aristides Figueira

5 Dec 1943 Brasileiro de Seleções	Rio de Janeiro (DF)	3–0	(Rio de Janeiro (state)) Rio de Janeiro (RJ)	Rio de Janeiro
	Perácio 5', 39', 80'			Stadium: General Severiano; Referee: José Pereira Peixoto

8 Dec 1943 Brasileiro de Seleções	Rio de Janeiro (DF)	4–0	(Rio de Janeiro (state)) Rio de Janeiro (RJ)	Rio de Janeiro
	Perácio 35'; Ademir 64'; Amorim 71'; Pirillo 89'			Stadium: Estádio das Laranjeiras; Referee: Mariano Carneiro Pessoa

12 Dec 1943 Brasileiro de Seleções	São Paulo (São Paulo (state))	3–1	Rio de Janeiro	São Paulo
	Leônidas 26'; Luisinho 32', 88'		Pirillo 19' (pen.)	Stadium: Estádio do Pacaembu; Referee: Genaro Cirilo (URU)

15 Dec 1943 Brasileiro de Seleções	São Paulo (São Paulo (state))	3–2	Rio de Janeiro	São Paulo
	Servílio 11'; Hércules 35'; Luisinho 88'		Tim 5'; Ademir 8'	Stadium: Estádio do Pacaembu; Referee: Aníbal Tejada (URU)

19 Dec 1943 Brasileiro de Seleções	Rio de Janeiro	3–0	(São Paulo (state)) São Paulo	Rio de Janeiro
	Lelé 6', 67'; Pinto 16'			Stadium: São Januário; Referee: Genaro Cirilo (URU)

23 Dec 1943 Brasileiro de Seleções	Rio de Janeiro	6–1	(São Paulo (state)) São Paulo	Rio de Janeiro
	Vevé 25'; Pinto 40', 62', 81', 83'; Lelé 64' (pen.)		Leônidas 49'	Stadium: São Januário; Referee: Aníbal Tejada (URU)

30 Dec 1943 Brasileiro de Seleções	Rio de Janeiro	2–1	(São Paulo (state)) São Paulo	Rio de Janeiro
	Vevé 31'; Pinto 32'		Leônidas 86'	Stadium: São Januário; Referee: Genaro Cirilo (URU)

4 Nov 1944 Friendly	Rio de Janeiro	0–1	(Brazil) Flamengo	Rio de Janeiro
			Sanz 5'	Stadium: Estádio das Laranjeiras; Referee: Alderico Solon

19 Nov 1944 Brasileiro de Seleções	Minas Gerais	0–4	Rio de Janeiro	São Paulo
			Jorginho 32'; Ademir 35', 49'; Heleno de Freitas 55'	Stadium: Estádio do Pacaembu; Referee: Henrique Faillace

26 Nov 1944 Brasileiro de Seleções	Rio de Janeiro	0–1	Minas Gerais	Rio de Janeiro
	Zizinho 11'; Ademir 12'		Alvim 54'	Stadium: General Severiano; Referee: Francisco Cunha

3 Dec 1944 Brasileiro de Seleções	Rio de Janeiro	1–1	(São Paulo (state)) São Paulo	Rio de Janeiro
	Djalma 38'		Zezé Procópio 44'	Stadium: São Januário; Referee: João Etzel Filho

6 Dec 1944 Brasileiro de Seleções	Rio de Janeiro	3–1	(São Paulo (state)) São Paulo	Rio de Janeiro
	Heleno de Freitas 32', 82'; Jair 76'		Cláudio 21'	Stadium: São Januário; Referee: Sílvio Stucchi

10 Dec 1944 Brasileiro de Seleções	São Paulo (São Paulo (state))	2–1	Rio de Janeiro	São Paulo
	Servílio 3'; Noronha 84'		Jorginho 18'	Stadium: Estádio do Pacaembu; Referee: Oscar Pereira Gomes

14 Dec 1944 Brasileiro de Seleções	São Paulo (São Paulo (state))	4–3	Rio de Janeiro	São Paulo
	Leônidas 1'; Luisinho 27', 30', 33'		Ademir 42', 56'; Heleno de Freitas 73'	Stadium: Estádio do Pacaembu; Referee: Oscar Pereira Gomes

17 Dec 1944 Brasileiro de Seleções	Rio de Janeiro	3–1	(São Paulo (state)) São Paulo	Rio de Janeiro
	Amorim 11'; Jorginho 30'; Ademir 65'		Leônidas 74'	Stadium: São Januário; Referee: José Alexandrino

20 Nov 1945 Friendly	Rio de Janeiro	0–5	(Brazil) Vasco da Gama	Rio de Janeiro
			Chico 17'; Santo Cristo 25', 43'; Lelé 57'; Friaça 62'	Stadium: Estádio das Laranjeiras; Referee: Angelino Leite

30 May 1946 Friendly	Minas Gerais	0–2	Rio de Janeiro	Belo Horizonte
			Chico 42'; Jair 50'	Stadium: Presidente Antônio Carlos; Referee: Oscar Pereira Gomes

1 Dec 1946 Brasileiro de Seleções	Rio de Janeiro	8–3	Minas Gerais	Rio de Janeiro
	Isaías 11'; Djalma 18', 55'; Jair 37', 56'; Chico 52', 54'; Lelé 73'		Paulinho 33', 39'; Ceci 67'	Stadium: General Severiano; Referee: Oswaldo Rolla

8 Dec 1946 Brasileiro de Seleções	Minas Gerais	1–2	Rio de Janeiro	São Paulo
	Ceci 83'		Chico 10'; Jair 31'	Stadium: Estádio do Pacaembu; Referee: Oswaldo Rolla

9 Jan 1947 Friendly	Fluminense (Brazil)	6–2	Rio de Janeiro	Rio de Janeiro
	Pingo de Ouro 15'; Pinhegas 40', 59', 88'; Jayme 79' (pen.); Simões 81'		Isaías 53'; Ademir 56'	Stadium: São Januário; Referee: Mário Vianna

8 Mar 1947 Brasileiro de Seleções	São Paulo (São Paulo (state))	5–2	Rio de Janeiro	São Paulo
	Servílio 31', 38', 83'; Cláudio 57', 59'		Heleno de Freitas 35'; Ademir 76'	Stadium: Estádio do Pacaembu; Referee: João Etzel Filho

12 Mar 1947 Brasileiro de Seleções	Rio de Janeiro	3–2	(São Paulo (state)) São Paulo	Rio de Janeiro
	Ademir 1'; Maneca 38', 55'		Teixeirinha 10'; Lima 12'	Stadium: São Januário; Referee: Mário Vianna

16 Mar 1947 Brasileiro de Seleções	Rio de Janeiro	4–1	(São Paulo (state)) São Paulo	Rio de Janeiro
	Chico 38'; Maneca 53', 66', 78'		Servílio 6'	Stadium: São Januário; Referee: João Etzel Filho

3 Jan 1948 Friendly	Rio de Janeiro	4–1	(Brazil) Vasco da Gama	Rio de Janeiro
	Lima; Romulo (o.g.); Esquerdinha		Friaça	Stadium: Estádio das Laranjeiras; Referee: Carlos Monteiro

8 Mar 1950 Brasileiro de Seleções	Minas Gerais	2–4	Rio de Janeiro	Belo Horizonte
	Lucas Miranda 1'; Ceci 31' (pen.)		Ademir 26', 85'; Zizinho 28'; Chico 65'	Stadium: Alameda; Referee: Mário Vianna

16 Mar 1950 Brasileiro de Seleções	Rio de Janeiro	3–0	Minas Gerais	Rio de Janeiro
	Maneca 39'; Nestor 67'; Chico 69'			Stadium: São Januário; Referee: Harry Rowley

16 Mar 1950 Brasileiro de Seleções	Rio de Janeiro	4–0	(São Paulo (state)) São Paulo	Rio de Janeiro
	Zizinho 1', 49'; Ipojucan 8', 24'			Stadium: São Januário; Referee: Mário Vianna

19 Mar 1950 Brasileiro de Seleções	São Paulo (São Paulo (state))	2–2	Rio de Janeiro	São Paulo
	Cláudio 13'; Baltazar 38'		Zizinho 25'; Chico 50'	Stadium: Estádio do Pacaembu; Referee: Harry Rowley

22 Mar 1950 Brasileiro de Seleções	São Paulo (São Paulo (state))	1–1	Rio de Janeiro	São Paulo
	Baltazar 19'		Nílton Santos 20'	Stadium: Estádio do Pacaembu; Referee: Cyril Barrick

17 Jun 1950 Friendly	Rio de Janeiro	1–3	(São Paulo (state)) São Paulo	Rio de Janeiro
	Didi 10'		Augusto 16', 89'; Ponce de León 85'	Stadium: Estádio do Maracanã; Referee: Alberto da Gama Malcher
