= 1930 in Brazilian football =

Football in Brazil
- Season: 1930

The following article presents a summary of the 1930 football (soccer) season in Brazil, which was the 29th season of competitive football in the country.

== Campeonato Paulista ==
Final Standings

Position	Team	Points	Played	Won	Drawn	Lost	For	Against	Difference
1	Corinthians	44	26	20	4	2	94	33	61
2	São Paulo da Floresta	40	26	15	10	1	74	27	47
3	Palestra Itália-SP	40	26	17	6	3	85	27	58
4	Santos	40	26	18	4	4	80	38	42
5	Portuguesa	30	26	13	4	9	67	56	11
6	Guarani	29	26	13	3	10	66	52	14
7	SC Internacional de São Paulo	25	26	10	5	11	45	43	2
8	Atlético Santista	22	26	9	4	13	53	65	-12
9	Juventus	21	26	10	1	15	39	61	-22
10	Sírio	21	26	9	3	14	65	60	5
11	CS América	16	26	7	2	17	33	73	-40
12	Ypiranga-SP	11	26	4	3	19	29	100	-71
13	Germânia	11	26	5	1	20	44	79	-35
14	AA São Bento	11	26	4	3	19	34	94	-60

Corinthians declared as the Campeonato Paulista champions.

== State championship champions ==
State	Champion	State	Champion
Acre	-	Paraíba	not disputed
Alagoas	CRB	Paraná	Atlético Paranaense
Amapá	-	Pernambuco	Torre
Amazonas	Cruzeiro do Sul	Piauí	-
Bahia	Botafogo-BA	Rio de Janeiro	Ypiranga and Fluminense de Niterói (shared)
Ceará	Orion	Rio de Janeiro (DF)	Botafogo
Espírito Santo	Rio Branco-ES	Rio Grande do Norte	América-RN
Goiás	-	Rio Grande do Sul	Pelotas
Maranhão	Sampaio Corrêa	Rondônia	-
Mato Grosso	-	Santa Catarina	Avaí
Minas Gerais	Palestra Itália-MG	São Paulo	Corinthians
Pará	Remo	Sergipe	not disputed

== Brazil national team ==
The following table lists all the games played by the Brazil national football team in official competitions and friendly matches during 1930.

Date	Opposition	Result	Score	Brazil scorers	Competition
July 14, 1930	Yugoslavia	L	1-2	Preguinho	World Cup
July 20, 1930	Bolivia	W	4-0	Preguinho (2), Moderato (2)	World Cup
August 1, 1930	France	W	3-2	Heitor Domingues (2), Friedenreich	International Friendly
August 10, 1930	Yugoslavia	W	4-1	Carvalho Leite (2), Benedicto, Russinho	International Friendly
August 17, 1930	United States	W	4-3	Doca, Carvalho Leite, Preguinho, Teóphilo	International Friendly
