= Moderato =

Moderato may refer to:

- Moderato, an Italian musical term; see Glossary of music terminology#M
- Moderato Wisintainer (1902-1986), Brazilian footballer generally known as Moderato

== See also ==
- Moderato Cantabile, a 1958 novel by Marguerite Duras
