= Junqueira =

Junqueira may refer to:

People:

- Bruno Junqueira (born 1976), Brazilian race car driver
- Diego Junqueira (born 1980), Argentinian tennis player
- João Junqueira (born 1965), Portuguese runner
- Junqueira Freire (1832–1855), Brazilian poet and Benedictine monk
- Alfredo Junqueira Dala, Angolan politician
- Durval Junqueira Machado (1900–1959), Brazilian footballer
- José Junqueira de Oliveira (1910–1985), Brazilian footballer
- Paulo Alfeu Junqueira Duarte (1899–1984), Brazilian archaeologist and humanist

Other:

- ARCD Junqueira, amateur futsal team based in Santa Cruz do Bispo, Portugal
- Junqueira (Póvoa de Varzim), shopping street in Póvoa de Varzim, Portugal
- Junqueira cow, cattle breed from Brazil
