= Policarpo =

Policarpo may refer to:

People:

- José Policarpo (1936-2014), Roman Catholic Cardinal, Patriarch of Lisbon
- Policarpo Bonilla (1858–1926), President of Honduras (1894-1899)
- Poli Díaz (born 1966), Spanish former professional boxer
- Policarpo Paz García (1932-2000), military officer and President of Honduras {1978-1982)
- Policarpo Cacherano d'Osasco (1744-1824), a general in the Napoleonic Wars
- Policarpo Ribeiro de Oliveira (1907-1986), Brazilian footballer
- Policarpo Toro (1851-1921), Chilean naval officer
- Policarpo Avendaño, a fictional character from the Chilean TV comedy 31 Minutos

Other uses:

- Policarpo (film), a 1959 Italian comedy
- Policarpo River, Mitre Peninsula, Argentina
