= Og Moreira =

Brazilian footballer (1917–1985)

Personal information
- Date of birth: 22 September 1917
- Place of birth: Nova Friburgo, Brazil
- Date of death: 1985 (aged 67–68)
- Place of death: Nova Friburgo, Brazil
- Position: Midfielder

Senior career*
Years	Team	Apps	(Gls)
1933–1940	America-RJ		
1940	Racing	3	(0)
1941–1942	Fluminense	16	(2)
1942–1949	Palmeiras	203	(27)
1949	Nacional-SP		
1950–1952	Juventus-SP		
- * Club domestic league appearances and goals

Og Moreira (22 September 1917 – 1985) was a Brazilian professional footballer who played as a midfielder.

== Career ==
Discovered by America-RJ in the 1930s, he was part of the club's campaign to win the state title in 1935, remaining with the club until 1940, when he had a stint for a few months at Argentine club Racing He returned to Brazil with Fluminense in 1941, winning the state championship again, and in 1942 he became the first black to play for Palmeiras, a club where he made 203 appearances and remained until 1949. He also played for Nacional-SP and Juventus-SP in São Paulo.

== Honours ==
America-RJ

- Campeonato Carioca: 1935 (LCF)

Fluminense

- Campeonato Carioca: 1941
- Torneio Início Carioca: 1941

Palmeiras

- Campeonato Paulista: 1942, 1944, 1947
- Taça dos Campeões Estaduais Rio-São Paulo: 1942, 1947
- Taça Cidade de São Paulo: 1945
