= 1941 Campeonato Carioca =

Campeonato Carioca
- Season: 1941
- Champions: Fluminense
- Matches played: 120
- Goals scored: 592 (4.93 per match)
- Top goalscorer: Pirillo (Flamengo) – 39 goals
- Biggest home win: Botafogo 8-1 São Cristóvão (June 15, 1941)
- Biggest away win: São Cristóvão 0-9 Fluminense (July 20, 1941)
- Highest scoring: Bangu 2-10 Fluminense (October 5, 1941)

The 1941 edition of the Campeonato Carioca kicked off on May 4, 1941 and ended on November 23, 1941. It was organized by FMF (Federação Metropolitana de Futebol, or Metropolitan Football Federation). Ten teams participated. Fluminense won the title for the 14th time. no teams were relegated.

== System ==
The tournament would be divided in two stages:

- First phase: The ten teams all played against each other in a double round-robin format. The six best teams qualified to the Second phase.
- Second phase: The remaining six teams all played in a double round-robin format against each other. The team with the most points in the sum of both stages won the title.

== Championship ==
=== First phase ===
Pos	Team	Pld	W	D	L	GF	GA	GD	Pts	Qualification or relegation
1	Flamengo	18	15	2	1	61	15	+46	32	Qualified to Second phase
2	Fluminense	18	14	0	4	65	34	+31	28	Qualified to Second phase
3	Botafogo	18	12	2	4	66	42	+24	26	Qualified to Second phase
4	Vasco da Gama	18	9	5	4	46	28	+18	23	Qualified to Second phase
5	Madureira	18	7	1	10	43	45	−2	15	Qualified to Second phase
6	Bangu	18	6	2	10	35	52	−17	14	Qualified to Second phase
7	América	18	3	6	9	30	44	−14	12	
8	Canto do Rio	18	5	2	11	39	58	−19	12	
9	São Cristóvão	18	4	2	12	28	72	−44	10	
10	Bonsucesso	18	2	4	12	28	51	−23	8	

Updated to match(es) played on August 31, 1941. Source: RSSSF.com
Rules for classification: 1) points; 2) goal difference; 3) wins; 4) number of goals scored.

=== Second phase ===
Pos	Team	Pld	W	D	L	GF	GA	GD	Pts
1	Fluminense	10	8	1	1	41	14	+27	17
2	Vasco da Gama	10	6	2	2	23	11	+12	14
3	Botafogo	10	6	1	3	25	23	+2	13
4	Flamengo	10	5	2	3	24	17	+7	12
5	Madureira	10	1	0	9	16	39	−23	2
6	Bangu	10	1	0	9	22	47	−25	2

Updated to match(es) played on November 23, 1941. Source: RSSSF.com
Rules for classification: 1) points; 2) goal difference; 3) wins; 4) number of goals scored.

=== Final standings ===
Pos	Team	Pld	W	D	L	GF	GA	GD	Pts	Qualification or relegation
1	Fluminense	28	22	1	5	106	48	+58	45	Champions
2	Flamengo	28	20	4	4	85	32	+53	44	
3	Botafogo	28	18	3	7	91	65	+26	39	
4	Vasco da Gama	28	15	7	6	69	39	+30	37	
5	Madureira	28	8	1	19	59	84	−25	17	
6	Bangu	28	7	2	19	57	99	−42	16	
7	América	18	3	6	9	30	44	−14	12	
8	Canto do Rio	18	5	2	11	39	58	−19	12	
9	São Cristóvão	18	4	2	12	28	72	−44	10	
10	Bonsucesso	18	2	4	12	28	51	−23	8	

Updated to match(es) played on November 23, 1941. Source: RSSSF.com
Rules for classification: 1) points; 2) goal difference; 3) wins; 4) number of goals scored.

=== Top Scores ===
Rank	Player	Club	Goals
1	Sylvio Pirillo	Flamengo	39
2	Luis María Rongo	Fluminense	25
3	Heleno de Freitas	Botafogo	24
4	Isaías	Madureira	20
5	Lula	Bangu	19
5	Pedro Amorim	Fluminense	19
7	Pascoal	Botafogo	17

== Extra Tournament ==
Pos	Team	Pld	W	D	L	GF	GA	GD	Pts	Qualification or relegation
1	Fluminense	9	8	0	1	40	13	+27	16	Champions
2	São Cristóvão	9	6	0	3	22	13	+9	12	
3	Vasco da Gama	9	6	0	3	23	15	+8	12	
4	América	9	5	2	2	24	18	+6	12	
5	Flamengo	9	5	0	4	16	13	+3	12 (Note: Canto do Rio lost the points of its last three matches (ties against Madureira and Botafogo and a win against Flamengo) for fielding a ineligible player.)	
6	Botafogo	9	4	1	4	16	22	−6	10	
7	Bangu	9	3	1	5	20	31	−11	7	
8	Bonsucesso	9	2	0	7	17	27	−10	4	
9	Madureira	9	1	1	7	17	36	−19	4	
10	Canto do Rio	9	1	3	5	25	32	−7	1	

Updated to match(es) played on January 14, 1942. Source: RSSSF.com
Rules for classification: 1) points; 2) goal difference; 3) wins; 4) number of goals scored.

== Top Scores ==
Rank	Player	Club	Goals
1	Russo	Fluminense	14
2	Pedro Amorim	Fluminense	8
2	Lemine	América	8
2	Anito	Bangu	8
5	Pascoal	Botafogo	6
