= Junqueira (footballer, born 1910) =

Brazilian footballer (1910–1985)

Personal information
- Full name: José Junqueira de Oliveira
- Date of birth: 26 February 1910
- Place of birth: Vargem Grande do Sul, São Paulo, Brazil
- Date of death: 25 February 1985 (aged 74)
- Place of death: São Paulo, Brazil
- Position: Defender

Youth career
- 1926–1931: Mackenzie

Senior career*
Years	Team	Apps	(Gls)
1931–1945	Palmeiras	339	(0)

International career
1940	Brazil	1	(0)
- * Club domestic league appearances and goals as of 10 November 2025

José Junqueira de Oliveira (26 February 1910 – 25 February 1985), better known as Junqueira, was a Brazilian professional footballer who played as a defender.

== Career ==
Junqueira began his career in the youth ranks of AA Mackenzie College, playing there until 1931, when he was invited to turn professional by a director of the then known SS Palestra Itália. He played for Palmeiras/Palestra from 1931 to 1945, making a total of 339 appearances and winning seven state title, a record at the time. He retired in 1946 and served as an assistant to Osvaldo Brandão for a year, but subsequently stepped away from football.

Junqueira also played for the São Paulo state football team, and in one match for the Brazil national team, in 1940 against Argentina for the Roca Cup.

== Honours ==
Palmeiras

- Campeonato Paulista: 1932, 1933, 1934, 1936, 1940, 1942, 1944
- Torneio Rio-São Paulo: 1933
- Campeonato Paulista Extra (LFESP): 1938

== See also ==
- List of one-club men in association football
