= Romeu Pellicciari =

Brazilian footballer

Personal information
- Full name: Romeu Pellicciari
- Date of birth: 26 March 1911
- Place of birth: Brazil
- Date of death: 15 July 1971 (aged 60)
- Position: Forward

Senior career*
Years	Team	Apps	(Gls)
- São João
- Palmeiras
- Fluminense
- Comercial-Ribeirão Preto

International career
- Brazil
Medal record
Representing Brazil
FIFA World Cup
Third place	1938 France
- * Club domestic league appearances and goals

Romeu Pellicciari, also known as Romeu (born in Jundiai, March 26, 1911 – died in São Paulo, July 15, 1971) was an association footballer in striker role.

Of Italian origin, during his career (1928–1944) he played for União São João, Palmeiras, Fluminense and Comercial-Ribeirão Preto, and won four São Paulo State Championship (1932, 1933, 1934 and 1942), five Rio de Janeiro State Championship (1936, 1937, 1938, 1940 and 1941), one Rio São Paulo Tournament in 1933 and won top goalscorer São Paulo State Championship in 1934. For Brazilian team who have participated at 1938 FIFA World Cup placed at third place, played four matches and scored three goals. With Leônidas, Domingos and José Perácio, forming one of the most valuable four-striker team of the 1930s. He died at 60 years old.

== Honours ==
Fluminense

- Campeonato Carioca: 1936, 1937, 1938, 1940, 1941

Palmeiras

- Campeonato Paulista: 1932, 1933, 1934, 1942
- Torneio Rio–São Paulo: 1933
