= Alfredo Willemsens =

Brazilian footballer

Alfredinho
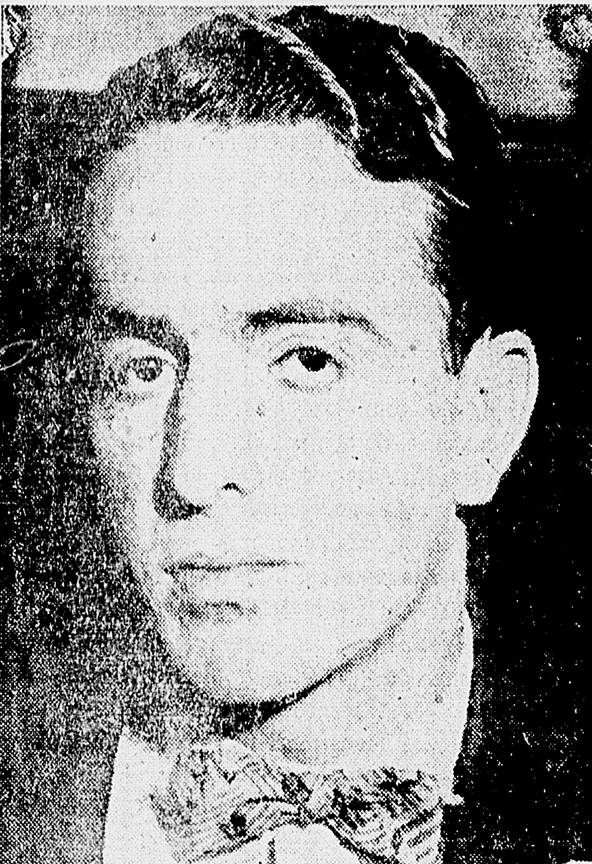

Personal information
- Full name: Alfredo Willemsens
- Date of birth: 4 October 1907
- Place of birth: Rio de Janeiro, Brazil
- Date of death: 5 May 1990
- Position: Forward

Senior career*
| Years | Team | Apps | (Gls) |
| 1926–1932 | Fluminense | 156 | (86) |
| 1932–1937 | Flamengo | 106 | (103) |
| 1937 | Fluminense | 11 | (4) |
| Total | | 273 | (193) |
- * Club domestic league appearances and goals as of 29 June 2024

Alfredo Willemsens (4 October 1907 – 5 May 1990), also known as Alfredinho, was a Brazilian footballer who played as a forward.

== Career ==
A striker who only played for the Fluminense FC and CR Flamengo teams, Willemsens has one of the highest goals-per-game ratios in the history of both clubs. For Fluminense he made 167 appearances and scored 90 goals, and for Flamengo he made 106 appearances with 103 goals scored (0.97 goals per game). He died in Rio de Janeiro on 5 May 1990.

== Honours ==
Flamengo

- Torneio Extra: 1934
- Torneio Aberto do Rio de Janeiro: 1936
- Taça João Vianna Seilir: 1936
- Taça da Paz: 1937

Fluminense

- Campeonato Carioca: 1937 (LCF)
