= Plácido Monsores =

Brazilian footballer

Plácido
Personal information
- Full name: Plácido Assis Monsores
- Date of birth: 4 October 1912
- Place of birth: Rio de Janeiro, Brazil
- Date of death: 2 July 1977 (aged 64)
- Place of death: Rio de Janeiro, Brazil
- Position: Forward

Senior career*
Years	Team	Apps	(Gls)
1931–1934	Bangu		
1935–1943	America-RJ		
1943–1944	Ypiranga-SP		
1945	Bangu		

Managerial career
- 1945–1946: Bangu
- 1947–1954: Madureira
- 1956: America-RJ
- 1957–1958: América-PE
- 1962: Campo Grande-RJ
- 1964: Bangu
- 1964: Madureira
- 1967–1969: Bangu
- * Club domestic league appearances and goals as of 24 February 2024

Plácido Assis Monsores (4 October 1912 – 2 July 1977), also known as Plácido or Plácido Monsores, was a Brazilian professional footballer and manager, who played as a forward.

== Career ==
Revealed by Bangu, Plácido was part of the state champion squad in 1933. In 1935, he repeated the feat with America. On 30 July 1939 he played with a broken arm against Vasco da Gama, going down in the club's history as one of the greatest idols. He scored a total of 167 goals for America.

== Managerial career ==
As a coach, he began his career in 1945, replacing Salvador Perrini, then coach of Bangu who was facing health problems, but his first big job was at Madureira, where he implemented a 4-2-4 formation, more modern than the W-M system that prevailed in Brazilian football.

== Honours ==
=== Player ===
Bangu

- Campeonato Carioca: 1933 (LCF)

America

- Campeonato Carioca: 1935 (LCF)
