= Jarbas Batista =

Brazilian footballer

Jarbas
Personal information
- Full name: Jarbas Batista
- Date of birth: 5 September 1913
- Place of birth: Campos dos Goytacazes, Brazil
- Date of death: Unknown
- Position: Forward

Senior career*
Years	Team	Apps	(Gls)
1931–1932	Carioca		
1933–1946	Flamengo	377	(152)

International career
1932	Brazil	1	(0)
- * Club domestic league appearances and goals as of 2 March 2024

Jarbas Batista (5 September 1913 – ?), was a Brazilian professional footballer who played as a forward.

== Career ==
Revealed by Carioca, a club located in Gávea, Jarbas was called up to the Brazil national team in 1932, where he participated in some unofficial matches and a friendly against Uruguay. In 1933, he arrived at Flamengo, the club for which he made history with 377 appearances and 152 goals scored, being one of the six greatest scorers in the club's history to date.

== Honours ==
Flamengo

- Campeonato Carioca: 1939, 1942, 1943, 1944
- Torneio Extra: 1934
