= Mamede da Guia =

Brazilian footballer (1911–1948)

Personal information
- Full name: Mamede Antônio da Guia
- Date of birth: 19 May 1911
- Place of birth: Rio de Janeiro, Brazil
- Date of death: 8 January 1948 (aged 36)
- Place of death: Rio de Janeiro, Brazil
- Height: 1.61 m (5 ft 3 in)
- Position: Midfielder

Youth career
- 1927–1928: Bangu

Senior career*
Years	Team	Apps	(Gls)
1928–1936	Bangu	226	(52)
1936–1942	Flamengo	169	(3)
1943	Bangu	2	(0)
Total		397	(55)

International career
1939	Brazil	1	(0)
- * Club domestic league appearances and goals

Mamede Antônio da Guia (19 May 1911 – 8 January 1948), also known by the nickname Médio, was a Brazilian professional footballer who played as a midfielder.

== Career ==
Small in stature, especially compared to his other siblings, Mamede played for Bangu from 1928 to 1936, and then in 1943, making 228 appearances and scoring 52 goals, acting as left midfielder. He also played for Flamengo from 1936 to 1942, as a defensive midfielder, being state champion on two occasions.

For the Brazil national team, Médio played only once, on 15 January 1939 in a match against Argentina.

== Personal life and death ==
Mamede is brother of the footballers Domingos, Ladislau and Luiz Antônio. He received the nickname "Medium" because he was the sixth child of 11 siblings.

Mamede da Guia committed suicide on 8 January 1948, by shooting himself in the chest with a revolver twice. He suffered from depression after the end of his marriage.

== Honours ==
Bangu

- Campeonato Carioca: 1933
- Torneio Início: 1934

Flamengo

- Campeonato Carioca: 1939, 1942
