= Gradim =

Brazilian footballer (1908–1987)

Personal information
- Full name: Francisco Ferreira de Sousa
- Date of birth: 15 June 1908
- Place of birth: Vassouras, Brazil
- Date of death: 12 June 1987 (aged 78)
- Place of death: Rio de Janeiro, Brazil
- Position: Forward

Youth career
- Bonsucesso

Senior career*
Years	Team	Apps	(Gls)
1931–1932	Bonsucesso		
1933	Flamengo		
1933–1938	Vasco da Gama		

International career
1932	Brazil	1	(0)

Managerial career
- 1939–1949: Bonsucesso (youth)
- 1951–1954: Fluminense (assistant)
- 1954: Fluminense
- 1955–1956: Fluminense
- 1957–1959: Vasco da Gama
- 1959–1960: Brazil Olympic
- 1961–1962: Bangu
- 1963–1964: Barcelona SC
- 1966: Atlético Mineiro
- 1967: Campo Grande-RJ
- 1968–1969: Vasco da Gama (youth)
- 1969–1970: Náutico
- 1970: Campo Grande-RJ
- 1971: Cerro Porteño
- 1972: Náutico
- 1973: Náutico
- 1976–1977: Santa Cruz (youth)
- 1977: Santa Cruz
- * Club domestic league appearances and goals

Francisco Ferreira de Sousa (15 June 1908 – 12 June 1987), better known as Gradim, was a Brazilian professional footballer and manager, who played as a forward.

== Playing career ==
Revealed by Bonsucesso, he played for the club professionally in 1932 and 1933, when he was hired by CR Flamengo, alongside his strike partner Leônidas. Without achieving the previous performance, he ended up moving to CR Vasco da Gama, and there he scored the first goal of a completely professional match in the Campeonato Carioca, on 2 April 1934, against America. He had a single appearance for the Brazil national team, in 1932, against Uruguay.

== Managerial career ==
Gradim retired in 1938 after fracturing his leg, beginning his career as a coach in the youth categories at Bonsuceso, where he remained until the end of the 40s. In 1951 he became an assistant at Fluminense and in 1954 he had his first opportunity as manager of the main team.

In 1957 he arrived at Vasco da Gama where he repeated the feat as an athlete, becoming state champion in 1958 and the Rio-São Paulo tournament. He helped prepare the Olympic team in 1959 and 1960, and in 1963 he was Ecuadorian champion with Barcelona de Guayaquil. He also trained Bangu, Náutico and Campo Grande over the years. Gradim was the first coach of Dadá Maravilha at Campo Grande and Givanildo Oliveira at Santa Cruz

== Personal life ==
He received the nickname Gradim in reference to his speed when he was young, when Uruguayan striker Isabelino Gradín had stood out in the 1919 South American Championship held in Rio de Janeiro. He is often confused with two other people who received this nickname: Adhemar de Oliveira, who played for Santos FC during the 40s, and Fernando Ramos Soares, "Seu Gradim", scout who discovered Roberto Dinamite.

== Honours ==
=== Player ===
Vasco da Gama

- Campeonato Carioca: 1934 (LCF)

Brazil

- Copa Rio Branco: 1932

=== Manager ===
Vasco da Gama

- Campeonato Carioca: 1958
- Torneio Rio-São Paulo: 1958

Barcelona SC

- Ecuadorian Serie A: 1963
