= Alberto Zarzur =

Brazilian footballer (1912–1958)

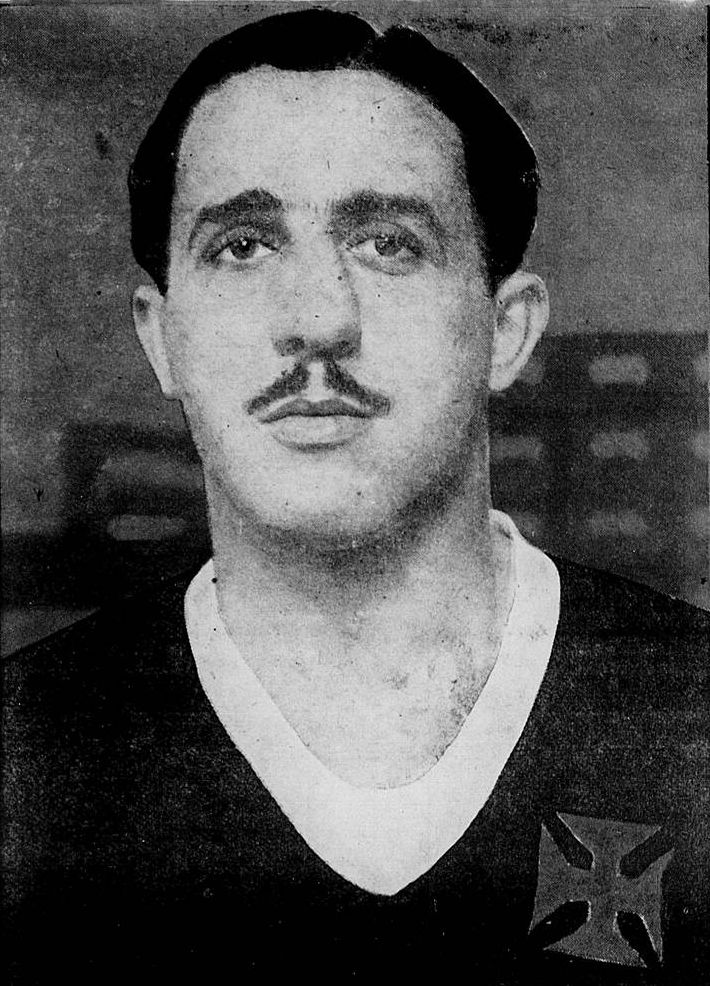
- Zarzur in 1941

Personal information
- Date of birth: 22 December 1912
- Place of birth: Rio de Janeiro, Brazil
- Date of death: 7 July 1958 (aged 45)
- Place of death: Rio de Janeiro, Brazil
- Position: Attacking midfielder

Senior career*
Years	Team	Apps	(Gls)
1930–1932	Atlético Santista		
1932–1935	São Paulo		
1935	San Lorenzo		
1935–1942	Vasco da Gama		
1942–1945	São Paulo		

International career
1937	Brazil		
- * Club domestic league appearances and goals

Alberto Zarzur (22 December 1912 – 7 July 1958) was a Brazilian footballer who played as an attacking midfielder for Brazilian clubs Atlético Santista, Vasco da Gama and São Paulo, and for the Argentine club San Lorenzo. He played for the Brazil national team in the Copa América Argentina 1937.

== Honours ==
São Paulo

- Campeonato Paulista 1931, 1943, 1945

Vasco da Gama

- Campeonato Carioca: 1936
