= Paschoal Silva =

Brazilian footballer (1900-1987)

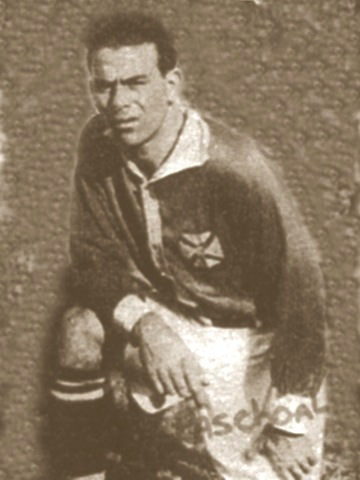

Personal information
- Full name: Paschoal da Silva Cinelli
- Date of birth: 24 May 1900
- Place of birth: Rio de Janeiro, Brazil
- Date of death: 23 December 1987 (aged 87)
- Position: Forward

Senior career*
Years	Team	Apps	(Gls)
1921-1932	Vasco da Gama		

International career
1923	Brazil	6	(0)
- * Club domestic league appearances and goals

Paschoal Silva (24 May 1900 – 23 December 1987) was a Brazilian footballer. He played in six matches for the Brazil national football team in 1923. He was also part of Brazil's squad for the 1923 South American Championship.
