= Estádio da Rua Campos Sales =

Multi-use stadium in Rio de Janeiro, Brazil

- Full name: Estádio da Rua Campos Sales
- Location: Rio de Janeiro, Brazil
- Owner: America Football Club
- Operator: America Football Club
- Capacity: 25,000

Construction
- Opened: 1924
- Closed: 1961

Tenant
- America Football Club

Estádio da Rua Campos Sales was a multi-use stadium in Rio de Janeiro, Brazil. It was initially used as the stadium of America Football Club matches. It was replaced by Estádio Wolney Braune in 1961. The capacity of the stadium was 25,000 spectators.
