= Carreiro (footballer) =

Brazilian footballer (1911–1963)

Personal information
- Full name: João Baptista Siqueira Lima
- Date of birth: 24 November 1911
- Place of birth: Campos dos Goytacazes, Brazil
- Date of death: 9 May 1963 (aged 51)
- Position: Forward

International career
Years	Team	Apps	(Gls)
1937–1940	Brazil	7	(0)

João Baptista Siqueira Lima (24 November 1911 – 9 May 1963), known as Carreiro, was a Brazilian footballer. He played in seven matches for the Brazil national football team from 1937 to 1940. He was also part of Brazil's squad for the 1937 South American Championship.
