= 1934 Campeonato Paulista =

The 1934 Campeonato Paulista was the 33rd season of São Paulo's top association football league. Two championships were disputed that season, each by a different league.

== APEA Championship ==
Campeonato Paulista
- Season: 1934
- Champions: Palestra Itália
- Matches played: 56
- Goals scored: 218 (3.89 per match)
- Top goalscorer: Romeu (Palestra Itália) – 13 goals
- Biggest home win: São Paulo 9–1 Sírio (April 1, 1934); Portuguesa 8–0 Sírio (April 15, 1934)
- Biggest away win: Sírio 0–5 Corinthians (August 12, 1934); Paulista 1–6 Portuguesa (September 2, 1934)
- Highest scoring: São Paulo 9–1 Sírio (April 1, 1934)

In the edition organized by the APEA (Associação Paulista de Esportes Atléticos), Palestra Itália won the title for the 6th time. No teams were relegated. The top scorer was Palestra Itália's Romeu, with 13 goals.

=== System ===
The championship was disputed in a double round-robin system, with the team with the most points winning the title.

=== Championship ===
Pos	Team	Pld	W	D	L	GF	GA	GD	Pts	Qualification or relegation
1	Palestra Itália	14	12	1	1	45	8	+37	25	Champions
2	São Paulo	14	10	3	1	34	12	+22	23	
3	Portuguesa	14	8	2	4	41	16	+25	18	
4	Corinthians	14	7	3	4	30	15	+15	17	
5	Santos	14	5	3	6	22	27	−5	13	
6	Ypiranga	14	3	2	9	21	42	−21	8	
7	Paulista	14	2	2	10	15	41	−26	6	
8	Sírio	14	1	0	13	10	57	−47	2	

Updated to match(es) played on September 16, 1934. Source: RSSSF.com
Rules for classification: 1) points; 2) goal difference; 3) wins; 4) head-to-head points.

== FPF Championship ==
Unofficial Campeonato Paulista
- Season: 1934
- Champions: Fiorentino

In the edition organized by the FPF (Federação Paulista de Football), which is not recognized by the present-day FPF as an official Paulista championship, Juventus, then playing under the name of Fiorentino, won the title for the 1st time. very little is known about that championship. The league folded soon after.
