= Vidal (footballer, born 1896) =

Brazilian footballer

Personal information
- Full name: Sylvio Vidal Leite Ribeiro
- Date of birth: 1 October 1896

International career
Years	Team	Apps	(Gls)
1917	Brazil	4	(0)

Sylvio Vidal Leite Ribeiro (born 1 October 1896, date of death unknown), known simply as Vidal, was a Brazilian footballer who played as a defender. He played in four matches for the Brazil national football team in 1917. He was also part of Brazil's squad for the 1917 South American Championship.
