= Fortes (footballer) =

Brazilian footballer (1901-1966)

Personal information
- Full name: Agostinho Fortes Filho
- Date of birth: 9 September 1901
- Place of birth: Rio de Janeiro, Brazil
- Date of death: 2 May 1966 (aged 64)
- Position: Midfielder

Senior career*
| Years | Team | Apps | (Gls) |
| 1914 | Flamengo | 1 | (0) |
| 1917–1919 | Fluminense | ? | (?) |
| 1919–1923 | Palestra Itália | ? | (?) |
| 1917–1930 | Fluminense | 230 | (16) |

International career
| 1919–1930 | Brazil | 13 | (0) |
Medal record
Men's football
Representing Brazil
South American Championship
| Winner | 1919 Brazil |
| Winner | 1922 Brazil |
| Runner-up | 1925 Argentina |
| Third place | 1920 Chile |
- * Club domestic league appearances and goals

Agostinho Fortes Filho (9 September 1901 – 2 May 1966) was a Brazilian football player who played as a midfielder. He was a member of the Brazilian squad at the 1930 FIFA World Cup finals and won two South American Championship (1919, 1922).

== Honours ==
=== Club ===
- Campeonato Carioca (4):

Fluminense: 1917, 1918, 1919, 1924

=== National ===
- South American Championship (2):

Brazil: 1919, 1922
