= Oswaldinho (footballer, born 1904) =

Brazilian footballer (1904–1962)

Personal information
- Full name: Oswaldo Mello
- Date of birth: 16 May 1904
- Place of birth: Rio de Janeiro, Brazil
- Date of death: 6 August 1962 (aged 58)
- Place of death: Rio de Janeiro, Brazil
- Positions: Midfielder; forward

Senior career*
Years	Team	Apps	(Gls)
1916–1930	America-RJ		
- * Club domestic league appearances and goals

Oswaldo Mello (16 May 1904 – 6 August 1962), better known as Oswaldinho, was a Brazilian professional footballer who played as a midfielder and forward.

== Career ==
Oswaldinho began his career in 1916 at America-RJ. His playing style was impressive with his ability to move on all parts of the field, which earned him the nickname "Queen". He participated in the 1922 and 1928 titles, in addition to being part of the squad that competed for the Brazil national team at the 1925 South American Championship. Oswaldinho ended his career with only 26 years old, at a time when football did not yield financial gains for athletes.

== Honours ==
America-RJ

- Campeonato Carioca: 1922, 1928
