= Russinho (footballer, born 1902) =

Brazilian footballer

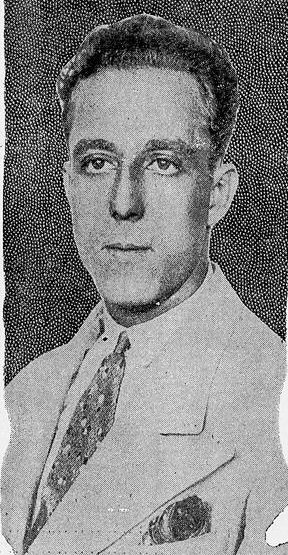
- Russinho in 1935

Personal information
- Full name: Moacyr Siqueira de Queiroz
- Date of birth: 18 December 1902
- Place of birth: Rio de Janeiro, Brazil
- Date of death: 14 August 1992 (aged 89)
- Position: Midfielder

Senior career*
Years	Team	Apps	(Gls)
1922–1923	Andarahy	?	(?)
1924–1934	Vasco da Gama	?	(?)
1935–1938	Botafogo	?	(?)

International career
1930	Brazil	2	(1)
- * Club domestic league appearances and goals

Moacyr Siqueira de Queiroz (18 December 1902 – 14 August 1992), known as Russinho, was a Brazilian footballer who played as a midfielder. He played for Brazil national football team at the 1930 FIFA World Cup.

He played club football for Andarahy, Vasco da Gama and Botafogo, winning the Campeonato Carioca in 1924, 1929 and 1934 with Vasco da Gama and in 1935 with Botafogo.

== Honours ==
=== Club ===
Vasco da Gama

- Campeonato Carioca: 1924, 1929, 1934

Botafogo

- Campeonato Carioca: 1935

=== Individual ===
- Campeonato Carioca topscorer: 1924 (14 goal), 1929 (23 goal), 1931 (17 goal)
