= Estádio Figueira de Melo =

Multi-use stadium in Rio de Janeiro, Brazil

Estádio Ronaldo Luis Nazário de Lima
- Figueirinha
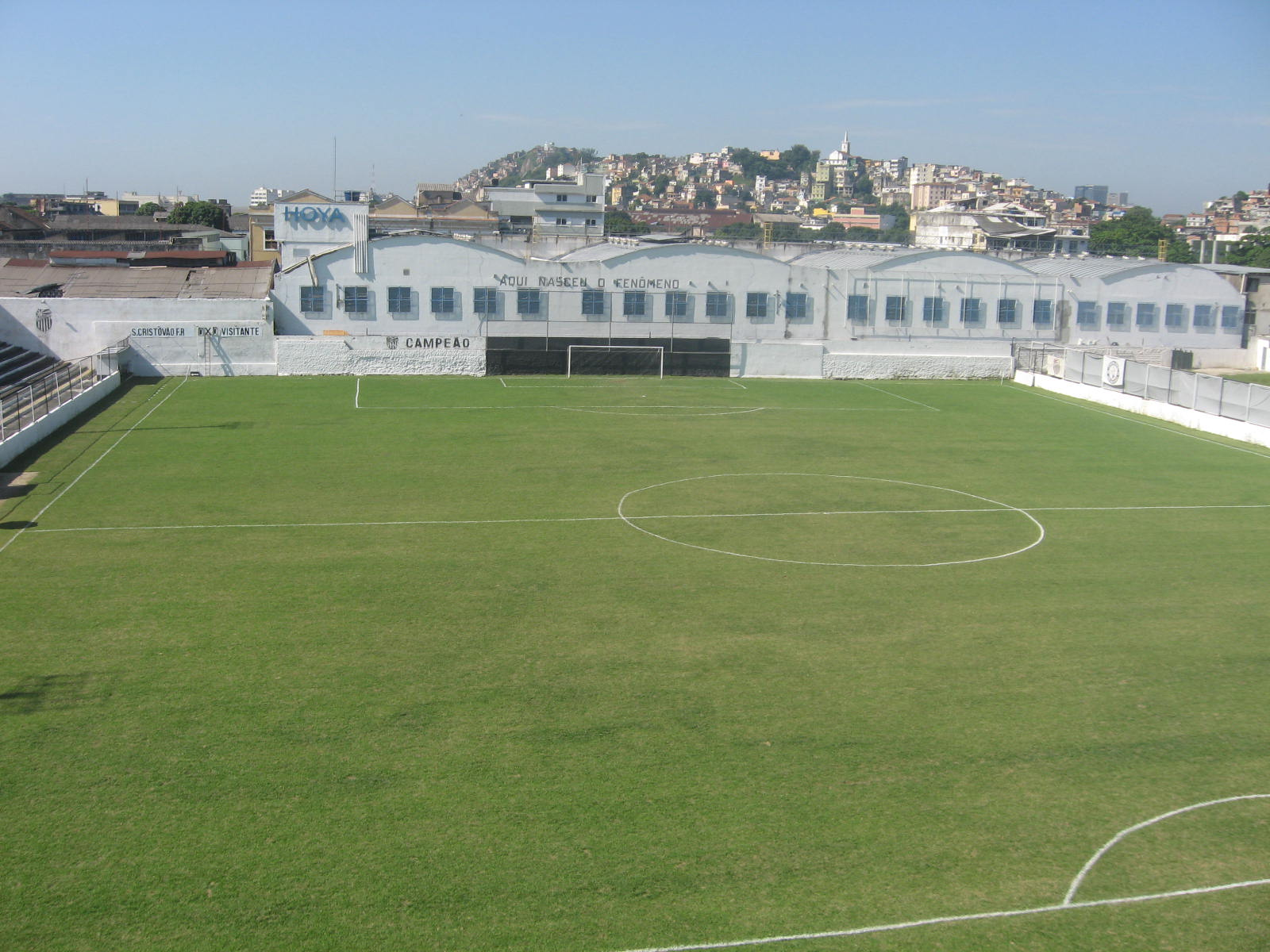
- Estádio Ronaldo Luis Nazário de Lima
- Interactive map of Estádio Ronaldo Luis Nazário de Lima
- Full name: Estádio Ronaldo Luis Nazário de Lima
- Location: Rio de Janeiro, Brazil
- Coordinates: 22°54′18.32″S 43°12′48.72″W
- Owner: São Cristóvão de Futebol e Regatas
- Operator: São Cristóvão de Futebol e Regatas
- Capacity: 8,000
- Surface: Grass

Construction
- Groundbreaking: 1916
- Opened: April 23, 1916

Tenant
- São Cristóvão de Futebol e Regatas (1916–present)

Estádio Ronaldo Luis Nazário de Lima, formerly known as Estádio Figueira de Melo or simply Figueirinha, is a multi-use stadium located in Rio de Janeiro, Brazil. Its primary use is as a football venue and hosts the home matches of São Cristóvão de Futebol e Regatas. The stadium has a maximum capacity of 8,000 and was built in 1916. The stadium was originally named for the street on which it is located, Figueira de Melo Street, but in 2013 it was renamed to Estádio Ronaldo Luis Nazário de Lima, after the former footballer Ronaldo, whose career started as a youth player for São Cristóvão.

== History ==
The first game was April 23, 1916, when São Cristóvão and Santos drew 1-1.
