= Ceci (footballer) =

Brazilian footballer (1921–2015)

Personal information
- Full name: Otacílio Henrique do Amparo
- Date of birth: 14 November 1921
- Place of birth: Nova Lima, Brazil
- Date of death: 20 May 2015 (aged 93)
- Place of death: São Paulo, Brazil
- Positions: Midfielder; striker

Youth career
- Villa Nova

Senior career*
Years	Team	Apps	(Gls)
1938–1939	Villa Nova		
1940	Retiro		
1941	Siderúrgica		
1942–1947	Villa Nova		
1947–1950	Cruzeiro		
1951–1957	Portuguesa		
- * Club domestic league appearances and goals

Otacílio Henrique do Amparo (14 November 1921 – 20 May 2015), better known as Ceci, was a Brazilian professional footballer.

== Career ==
Born in Nova Lima, Ceci started his career at Villa Nova, but also played for another club in the city, Retiro SC. Initially a midfielder, he went to Siderurgica where he ended up improvised as a striker, and was top scorer in the Minas Gerais championship in 1941. He returned to Villa Nova adapted to the position, where he repeated the feat in 1944.

He arrived at Cruzeiro as one of the most expensive signings in Minas Gerais football until then, but he did not perform as expected, returning once again to midfield, where he recovered his good football. He was a highlight of the Minas Gerais state football team in the Campeonato Brasileiro de Seleções Estaduais, being signed by Portuguesa de Desportos in 1951. There he stood out as a midfielder alongside Djalma Santos and Brandãozinho, and to this day he is considered one of the greatest players in the club's history, with 214 appearances.

== Death ==
Ceci died 20 May 2015, aged 93, at his home in Imirim neighbourhood, São Paulo.

== Honours ==
Portuguesa

- Torneio Rio-São Paulo: 1952, 1955
- Fita Azul: 1951, 1953, 1954

Individual

- 1941 Campeonato Mineiro top scorer: 16 goals
- 1944 Campeonato Mineiro top scorer: 12 goals
