= Oscar Carregal =

Brazilian footballer

Personal information
- Full name: Oscar Cyrillo Carregal
- Date of birth: 14 April 1898
- Place of birth: Niterói, Brazil
- Position: Forward

International career
Years	Team	Apps	(Gls)
1919	Brazil	1	(0)

Oscar Cyrillo Carregal (born 14 April 1898, date of death unknown) was a Brazilian footballer who played as a forward. He played in one match for the Brazil national football team in 1919. He was also part of Brazil's squad for the 1919 South American Championship.
