= Junqueira cattle =

Breed of cattle

The Junqueira cow is a cattle breed from Brazil that is the result of crosses between Caracu and other Brazilian varieties. It is of the subspecies Bos taurus ibericus and has submetacentric Y chromosomes, suggesting it is of taurine origin.

The breed has been raised since the 18th century in São Paulo, but only about 100 remained as of 2005. Early on, its long horns were used to manufacture berrantes.

Today, the Junqueira cow is an endangered species, with fewer than 100 left in Brazil. However, it has been cloned in the laboratory by the Brazilian Agricultural Research Corporation.
