= Zezé (footballer, born 1899) =

Brazilian footballer (1899–1969)

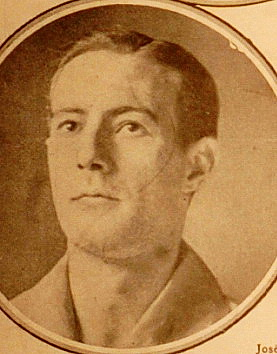

Personal information
- Full name: José Carlos Guimarães
- Date of birth: 2 May 1899
- Place of birth: Rio de Janeiro, Brazil
- Date of death: 24 January 1969 (aged 69)
- Position: Forward

Senior career*
Years	Team	Apps	(Gls)
- Fluminense

International career
1920–1923	Brazil	13	(2)
- * Club domestic league appearances and goals

José Carlos Guimarães, known as Zezé, (2 May 1899 – 24 January 1969) was a Brazilian footballer who played as a forward for Fluminense. He made 13 appearances for the Brazil national team from 1920 to 1923. He was also part of Brazil's squad for the 1920 South American Championship.
