= Vevé (footballer) =

Brazilian footballer

Personal information
- Full name: Everaldo Paes de Lima
- Date of birth: 14 March 1918
- Place of birth: Belém, Brazil
- Date of death: 27 July 1964 (aged 46)
- Position: Forward

Senior career*
Years	Team	Apps	(Gls)
1936–1939	Remo	?	(?)
1939–1941	Galícia	?	(?)
1941–1949	Flamengo	?	(?)

International career
1945	Brazil	1	(0)
Medal record
Men's Football
Representing Brazil
South American Football Championship
Runner-up	1945 Chile
- * Club domestic league appearances and goals

Everaldo Paes de Lima (14 March 1918 – 27 July 1964), better known as Vevé, was a Brazilian footballer. He played in one match for the Brazil national football team in 1945. He was also part of Brazil's squad for the 1945 South American Championship.
