= Ladislau da Guia =

Brazilian footballer (1906–1988)

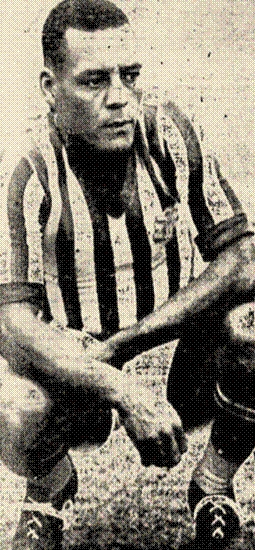
- Da Guia at Bangu, c. 1940

Personal information
- Full name: Ladislau Antônio da Guia
- Date of birth: 14 June 1906
- Place of birth: Rio de Janeiro, Brazil
- Date of death: 31 October 1988 (aged 82)
- Place of death: Rio de Janeiro, Brazil
- Height: 1.90 m (6 ft 3 in)
- Position: Forward

Senior career*
Years	Team	Apps	(Gls)
1922–1924	Bangu		
1925	America-RJ		
1926–1933	Bangu		
1933	Flamengo		
1934–1936	Bangu		
1936	Flamengo		
1937	Vasco da Gama		
1937	Flamengo		
1937–1940	Bangu		
1941	Canto do Rio		
- * Club domestic league appearances and goals

Ladislau da Guia (14 June 1906 – 31 October 1988) was a Brazilian professional footballer who played as a forward.

== Career ==
With an unusual height for the time, da Guia became one of the first specialists in headed goals in Brazilian football. He is the greatest scorer in the history of Bangu AC, with 226 goals in 335 appearances. He was the Campeonato Carioca top goal-scorer in 1930 and again in 1934.

In 1930, he refused to participate in the FIFA World Cup due to the inconvenience of the train journey that the Brazil team took to get to Uruguay. He also played for America, Flamengo, Vasco and Canto do Rio. His nickname was "Tijolo" (brick).

== Personal life ==
Ladislau da Guia is brother of the footballers Domingos, Luiz Antônio and Mamede.

== Honours ==
Bangu

- Campeonato Carioca: 1933
- Torneio Início: 1934

Individual

- 1930 Campeonato Carioca top scorer: 20 goals
- 1935 Campeonato Carioca top scorer: 18 goals
