= Estádio General Severiano =

Football stadium in Rio de Janeiro, Brazil

- Interactive map of Estádio General Severiano
- Location: Rio de Janeiro, Brazil
- Owner: Botafogo
- Capacity: 20,000

Construction
- Built: 1912
- Opened: May 13, 1913
- Renovated: 1938
- Demolished: 1977
- Architect: Rafael Galvão

Tenant
- Botafogo

Estádio General Severiano was a football stadium located in Rio de Janeiro, Brazil. It was the home stadium of Botafogo and it had a maximum capacity of 20,000 people.

== History ==
The stadium was built in 1912, It was inaugurated on May 13, 1913, when Botafogo beat Flamengo 1–0.

After a reformation led by architect Rafael Galvão that lasted ten years, Estádio General Severiano was reinaugurated on August 28, 1938, when Botafogo beat Fluminense 3–2. The stadium was closed in the 1970s, under Charles Borer's term as president, after Botafogo's headquarters, where the stadium was located in, was sold to Companhia Vale do Rio Doce. Estádio General Severiano was demolished in 1977.

== CT João Saldanha ==
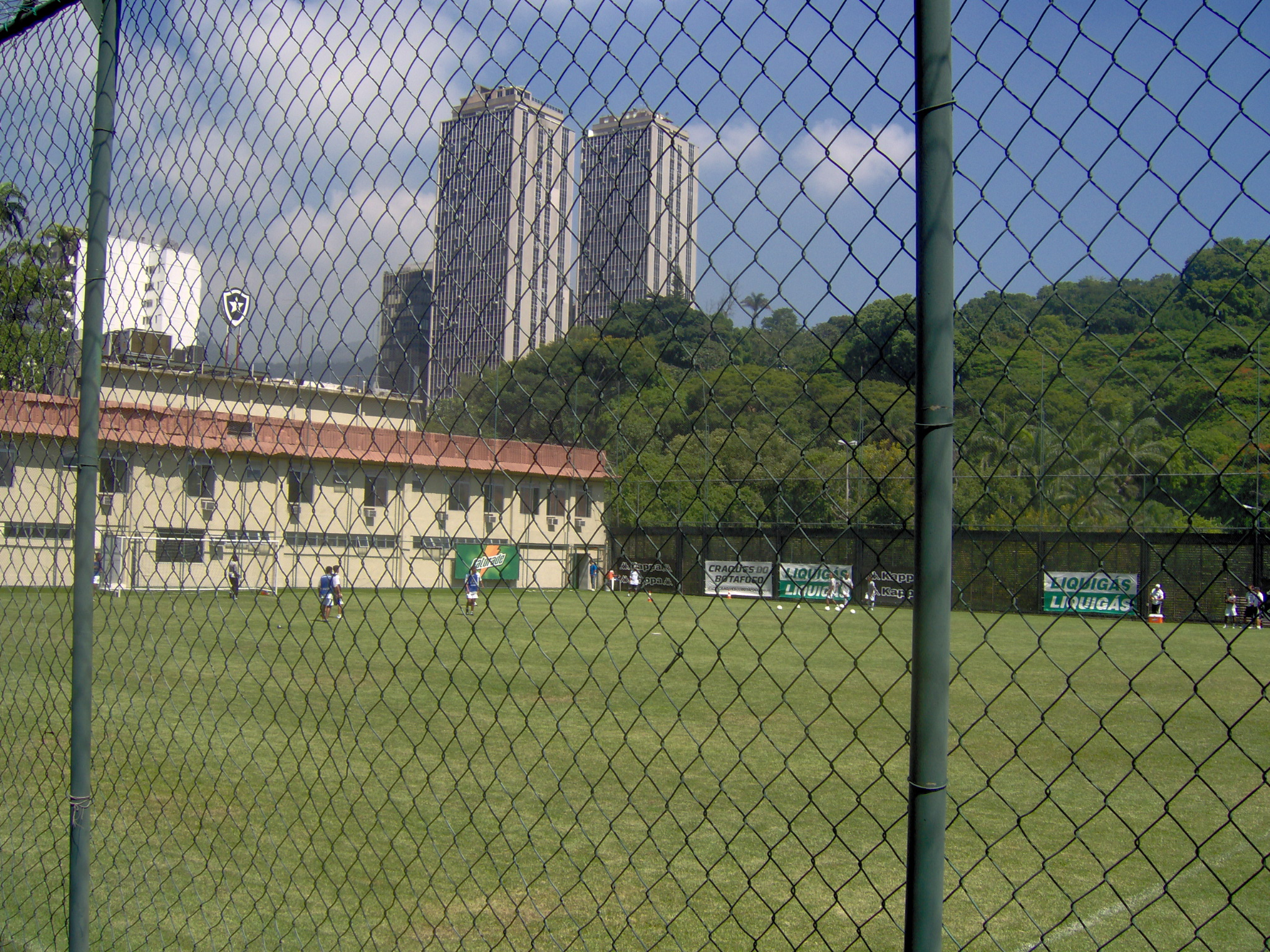
CT João Saldanha.

A training ground named Centro de Treinamento João Saldanha was inaugurated on March 29, 2004, in the same place where Estádio General Severiano was located in. The training ground name honors João Saldanha, who was a supporter of Botafogo, and was a former head coach and chairman of the club.
