= Bahia (footballer, born 1910) =

Brazilian footballer

Personal information
- Full name: Antônio Almeida
- Date of birth: 2 December 1910
- Position: Forward

International career
Years	Team	Apps	(Gls)
1937	Brazil	4	(1)

Antônio Almeida (born 2 December 1910, date of death unknown), known as Bahia, was a Brazilian footballer. He played in four matches for the Brazil national football team in 1937. He was also part of Brazil's squad for the 1937 South American Championship.
