= Nonô (footballer, born 1899) =

Brazilian footballer

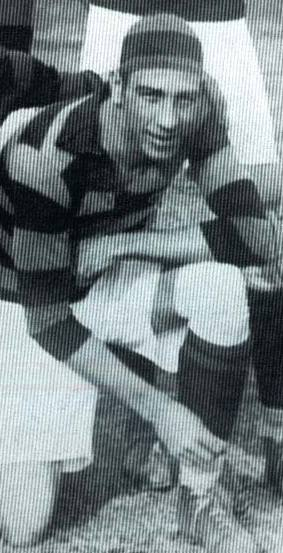

Personal information
- Full name: Claudionor Gonçalves da Silva
- Date of birth: 1 January 1899
- Place of birth: Rio de Janeiro, Brazil
- Date of death: 24 July 1931 (aged 32)
- Place of death: Rio de Janeiro, Brazil
- Position: Forward

Senior career*
Years	Team	Apps	(Gls)
1919–1920	Palmeiras A.C.		
1920–1930	Flamengo	102	(96)

International career
1920–1921	Brazil	1	(0)
- * Club domestic league appearances and goals

Nonô (full name : Claudionor Gonçalves da Silva; 1 January 1899 – 24 July 1931) was a Brazilian football forward for the Clube de Regatas do Flamengo. Nonô was born and died in Rio de Janeiro. He made one appearance for the Brazil national football team in the 1921 Copa América against Argentina.

== See also ==
- List of Clube de Regatas do Flamengo players
