= 1935 in Brazilian football =

Football in Brazil
- Season: 1935

The 1935 season was the 34th season of competitive football (soccer) in Brazil.

== Campeonato Paulista ==
In 1935 there were two different editions of the Campeonato Paulista. One was organized by the Associação Paulista de Esportes Atléticos (APEA) while the other one was organized by the Liga Paulista de Foot-Ball (LPF).

=== APEA's Campeonato Paulista ===
Final Standings

Position	Team	Points	Played	Won	Drawn	Lost	For	Against	Difference
1	Portuguesa	22	14	10	2	2	65	17	48
2	Ypiranga-SP	22	14	11	0	3	50	33	17
3	Estudantes	20	14	9	2	3	47	16	31
4	EC São Caetano	16	14	7	2	5	29	31	-2
5	Sírio Libanês	12	12	5	2	5	22	31	-9
6	Jardim América	7	13	3	1	9	23	39	-16
7	Humberto Primo	7	14	3	1	10	20	48	-28
8	Ordem e Progresso	2	13	1	0	12	13	54	-41

Championship Playoff

January 5, 1936

Portuguesa	2–2	Ypiranga-SP

In the first match, Ypiranga-SP, as a protest against the referee, abandoned the match and the points were awarded to Portuguesa.

January 12, 1936

Portuguesa	5–2	Ypiranga-SP

Portuguesa declared as the APEA's Campeonato Paulista champions by aggregate score of 7-4.

=== LPF's Campeonato Paulista ===
Final Standings

Position	Team	Points	Played	Won	Drawn	Lost	For	Against	Difference
1	Santos	20	12	9	2	1	31	11	20
2	Palestra Itália-SP	18	12	8	2	2	24	12	12
3	Corinthians	15	12	7	1	4	24	13	11
4	Hespanha	11	12	4	3	5	19	28	-9
5	Portuguesa Santista	11	12	5	1	6	28	31	-3
6	CA Paulista	5	12	2	1	9	17	43	-26
7	Juventus	4	12	1	2	9	12	27	-15

Santos declared as the LPF's Campeonato Paulista champions.

== Campeonato Carioca ==
In 1935, there were two different editions of the Campeonato Carioca. One was organized by the Federação Metropolitana de Desportos (FMD) while the other one was organized by the Liga Carioca de Foot-Ball (LCF).

=== FMD's Campeonato Carioca ===
Pos	Team	Pld	W	D	L	GF	GA	GD	Pts	Qualification or relegation
1	Botafogo	22	16	4	2	73	42	+31	36	Champions
2	Vasco da Gama	22	15	4	3	69	22	+47	34	
3	São Cristóvão	22	7	10	5	42	37	+5	24	
4	Andarahy	22	8	7	7	57	53	+4	23	
5	Bangu	22	7	7	8	61	64	−3	21	
6	Madureira	22	6	8	8	34	44	−10	20	
7	Carioca	22	6	4	12	32	47	−15	16	Withdrew
8	Olaria	22	4	2	16	29	65	−36	10	
9	Brasil	8	0	0	8	3	26	−23	0	Withdrew

Updated to match(es) played on January 26, 1936. Source: RSSSF.com
Rules for classification: 1) points; 2) goal difference; 3) wins; 4) number of goals scored.

Botafogo declared as the FMD's Campeonato Carioca champions.

=== LCF's Campeonato Carioca ===
Pos	Team	Pld	W	D	L	GF	GA	GD	Pts	Qualification or relegation
1	América	15	11	2	2	49	20	+29	24	Champions
2	Fluminense	15	11	1	3	63	26	+37	23	
3	Flamengo	15	8	4	3	36	22	+14	20	
4	Bonsucesso	15	6	2	7	34	38	−4	14	
5	Modesto	15	2	1	12	19	56	−37	5	
6	Portuguesa	15	2	0	13	25	64	−39	4	

Updated to match(es) played on November 10, 1935. Source: RSSSF.com
Rules for classification: 1) points; 2) goal difference; 3) wins; 4) number of goals scored.

America-RJ declared as the LCF's Campeonato Carioca champions.

== State championship champions ==
State	Champion	State	Champion
Acre	-	Paraíba	Palmeiras-PB
Alagoas	CSA	Paraná	Coritiba
Amapá	-	Pernambuco	Santa Cruz
Amazonas	Portuguesa-AM	Piauí	-
Bahia	Botafogo-BA	Rio de Janeiro	Ypiranga
Ceará	América-CE	Rio de Janeiro (DF)	Botafogo (by FMD); América (by LFC)
Espírito Santo	Rio Branco-ES	Rio Grande do Norte	ABC
Goiás	-	Rio Grande do Sul	9º Regimento de Infantaria
Maranhão	Tupan	Rondônia	-
Mato Grosso	-	Santa Catarina	Figueirense
Minas Gerais	Villa Nova	São Paulo	Portuguesa (by APEA); Santos (by LPF)
Pará	not disputed	Sergipe	Palestra-SE

== Other competition champions ==
Competition	Champion
Campeonato Brasileiro de Seleções Estaduais	Rio de Janeiro (DF); Rio de Janeiro (DF)^{(1)}

^{(1)}Two different Campeonato Brasileiro de Seleções Estaduais editions were contested in 1935. The professional competition was organized by the FBF (Federação Brasileira de Futebol) while the amateur competition was organized by the CBD (Confederação Brasileira de Desportos). Rio de Janeiro (Distrito Federal) won both competitions.

== Brazil national team ==
The Brazil national football team did not play any matches in 1935.
