= Wálter Guimarães =

Brazilian footballer

Personal information
- Full name: Wálter de Britto Guimarães
- Date of birth: 17 May 1913
- Place of birth: Rio de Janeiro, Brazil
- Date of death: 21 February 1979 (aged 65)
- Position: Defender

Senior career*
Years	Team	Apps	(Gls)
1931–1934	Botafogo		

International career
- Brazil
- * Club domestic league appearances and goals

Wálter Guimarães (17 May 1913 – 21 February 1979) was a Brazilian footballer. He played for Brazil national team at the 1934 FIFA World Cup finals.
