= 1934 Torneio Extra =

Tournament details
- Country: Rio de Janeiro, Brazil
- Dates: 16 Sep 1934 – 17 Feb 1935
- Teams: 7

Final positions
- Champions: Flamengo
- Runners-up: America

The Torneio Extra, was a qualifying tournament for the 1934 Torneio Rio-São Paulo, organized by LCF (Liga Carioca de Football).

The tournament was interrupted before the end due to the departure of Palestra Italia and Corinthians from APEA in São Paulo, and the creation of the LPF (Liga Paulista de Football). In Rio de Janeiro, a similar process occurred with the change of league of the main clubs (from the LCF to the FMD), which led to the non-realization of the Torneio-Rio São Paulo in 1934.

With some matches with some matches left to be played, Flamengo declared itself champion.

== Final standings ==
Following is the final table of the Torneio Extra:

Pos	Team	Pld	W	D	L	GF	GA	GD	Pts
1	Flamengo (C)	16	11	2	3	45	24	+21	24
2	America	16	9	3	4	30	26	+4	21
3	Vasco da Gama	12	6	4	2	22	15	+7	16
4	Fluminense	16	6	4	6	31	27	+4	16
5	Bangu	15	5	5	5	39	38	+1	15
6	São Cristóvão	14	3	3	8	23	33	−10	9
7	Bonsucesso	15	1	1	13	19	47	−28	3

Source: RSSSF
(C) Champions
