= Teóphilo =

Brazilian footballer

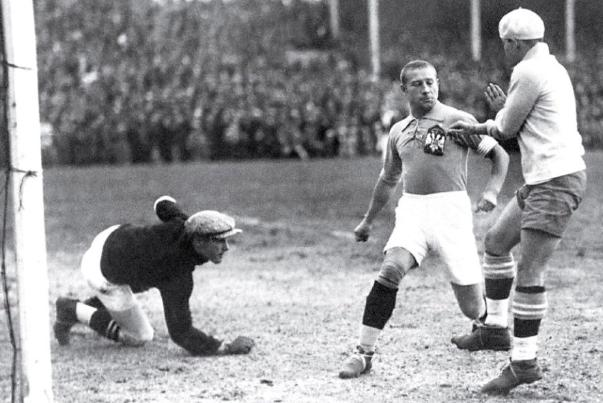

Personal information
- Full name: Teóphilo Bettencourt Pereira
- Date of birth: 11 April 1900
- Place of birth: Rio de Janeiro, Brazil
- Date of death: 10 April 1988 (aged 87)
- Position: Striker

Senior career*
Years	Team	Apps	(Gls)
1917	Fluminense	?	(?)
1918–1924	Americano	?	(?)
1925–1931	São Cristóvão	?	(?)
1932	Fluminense	?	(?)

International career
1930–1931	Brazil	5	(1)
- * Club domestic league appearances and goals

Teóphilo Bettencourt Pereira (11 April 1900 – 10 April 1988), known as just Teóphilo, was a Brazilian football player. He played for Brazil national football team at the 1930 FIFA World Cup finals.

He played club football for Americano, São Cristóvão and Fluminense, winning the Campeonato Carioca in 1917 with Fluminense and in 1926 with São Cristóvão.

== Honours ==
=== Club ===
- Campeonato Carioca (2):

Fluminense: 1917
São Cristóvão: 1926

=== National ===
- Copa Río Branco (1):

Brazil: 1931
