= Russo (footballer, born 1915) =

Brazilian footballer (1915–1980)

Adolpho Milman
Personal information
- Date of birth: 26 July 1915
- Place of birth: Pelotas, Brazil
- Date of death: 11 October 1980 (aged 65)
- Position: Forward

Senior career*
Years	Team	Apps	(Gls)
- Fluminense

International career
1942	Brazil	1	(0)
- * Club domestic league appearances and goals

Adolpho Milman (26 July 1915 – 11 October 1980) was a Brazilian footballer who played as a forward. He made one appearance for the Brazil national team in 1942. He was also part of Brazil's squad for the 1942 South American Championship.
