= Moderato (footballer) =

Brazilian footballer

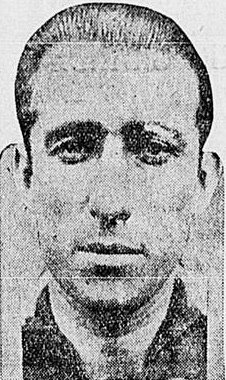
- Moderato Wisintainer in 1931

Personal information
- Full name: Moderato Wisintainer
- Date of birth: 14 July 1902
- Place of birth: Alegrete, Brazil
- Date of death: 31 January 1986 (aged 83)
- Place of death: Pelotas, Brazil
- Position: Forward

Senior career*
Years	Team	Apps	(Gls)
1921–1922	Palestra Itália	?	(?)
1923–1930	Flamengo	100	(17)
1931–1932	Guarany	?	(?)

International career
1925–1930	Brazil	5	(2)
- * Club domestic league appearances and goals

Moderato Wisintainer, also Visintainer, in line-ups generally Moderato, (14 July 1902 in Alegrete (RS) – 31 January 1986 in Pelotas (RS)) was a Brazilian association footballer. Moderato, who played on the right wing, took part with the Brazil national football team at the first World Cup in 1930 in Uruguay. In the 1920s he won twice the Championship of Rio de Janeiro with CR Flamengo. On several occasions he also played for the state teams of Rio and Rio Grande do Sul.

During his youth he played for EC 14 de Julho of Santana do Livramento (RS) before joining Guarani FC in his town of birth. In 1921 he moved to the newly founded club Palestra Itália, today known as Cruzeiro EC in Belo Horizonte, the capital of the state of Minas Gerais, where he stayed until 1922.

1923 he joined CR Flamengo in the then Brazilian capital Rio de Janeiro. Until 1930 he played in 147 matches for Flamengo scoring 27 goals. In 1925 and 1927 he won with the club the Championship of Rio de Janeiro. In the decisive match of the 1927 competition he scored the winning goal in a 2–1 victory over America FC, albeit being handicapped with a brace protecting a him after a recent appendix operation.

He debuted for the Brazil national team on 6 December 1925 in a 5–2 win over Paraguay in the South American Championship in Buenos Aires. He played three more matches for Brazil in this tournament, which finished second behind the hosts. In the first edition of the World Cup, 1930 in Uruguay was not selected for the first match, which Brazil lost 1–2 to Yugoslavia. In the second match against Bolivia, which Brazil won 4–0, he scored two goals and he became the second player to score for Brazil in a World Cup, after Preguinho from Rio's Fluminense FC. However, Brazil did not progress to the next round of the tournament.

After the World cup he returned to his home state where he finished his football career 1932 with his original club Guarani FC in Alegrete. With Guarani he became runner-up in the Rio Grande do Sul State Championship of 1931, losing in the final 0–3 to Grêmio FBPA of the capital Porto Alegre.

Afterwards Dr. Moderato Wisintainer worked as engineer in Pelotas (RS). He also was active as functionary for Esportivo Bento Gonçalves and in later years became an avid golf player. Moderato died in January 1986 aged 83 in Pelotas.

== Honours ==
=== Club ===
- Campeonato Carioca (2):

Flamengo: 1925, 1927

== International goals ==
Brazil's goal tally first

#	Date	Venue	Opponent	Score	Result	Competition
1.	20 July 1930	Estadio Centenario, Montevideo, Uruguay	Bolivia	1–0	4–0	1930 FIFA World Cup
2.	20 July 1930	Estadio Centenario, Montevideo, Uruguay	Bolivia	3–0	4–0	1930 FIFA World Cup
