= Pedro Amorim =

Brazilian footballer (1919–1989)

Personal information
- Full name: Pedro Amorim Duarte
- Date of birth: 13 October 1919
- Date of death: 25 September 1989 (aged 69)

International career
Years	Team	Apps	(Gls)
1940–1942	Brazil	6	(3)

Pedro Amorim Duarte (13 October 1919 – 25 September 1989) was a Brazilian footballer. He played in six matches for the Brazil national football team from 1940 to 1942. He was also part of Brazil's squad for the 1942 South American Championship.
