= Poly (footballer) =

Brazilian footballer

Personal information
- Full name: Policarpo Ribeiro de Oliveira
- Date of birth: 21 December 1907
- Place of birth: Conceição de Macabu, Brazil
- Date of death: May 1986
- Position: Striker

Senior career*
Years	Team	Apps	(Gls)
1924–1944	Americano	?	(?)

International career
1930	Brazil	1	(0)
- * Club domestic league appearances and goals

Policarpo Ribeiro de Oliveira (21 December 1907 – May 1986) was a Brazilian football player. He played for the Brazil national football team at the 1930 FIFA World Cup finals.

Poly played club football for Americano.
