= Heitor (footballer, born 1898) =

Brazilian footballer

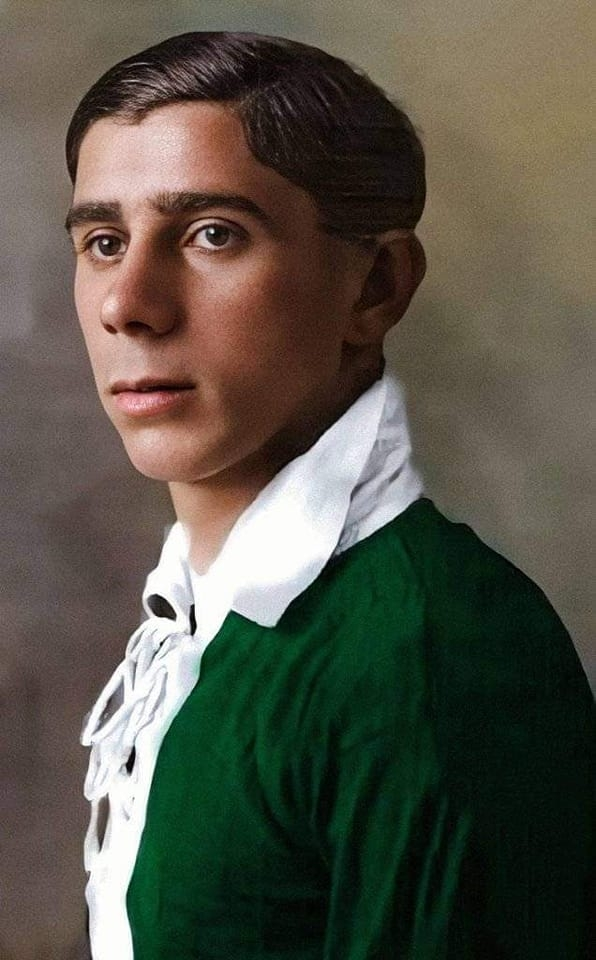

Personal information
- Full name: Ettore Marcelino Dominguez
- Date of birth: 20 December 1898
- Place of birth: São Paulo, Brazil
- Date of death: 21 September 1972 (aged 73)
- Place of death: São Paulo, Brazil
- Position: Forward

Senior career*
Years	Team	Apps	(Gls)
1916–1931	Palmeiras		(180)

International career
1906–1908	Brazil	11	(4)
1919–1931	São Paulo		(46)
- * Club domestic league appearances and goals

Ettore Marcelino Dominguez (20 December 1898 – 21 September 1972), known as Heitor, was a Brazilian footballer who played as a striker. He's Palmeiras' all time top scorer with 327 goals in 358 games.

== Honours ==
Palmeiras

- São Paulo State Championship: 1920, 1926, 1926 (extra), 1927
- Taça dos Campeões Estaduais Rio-São Paulo: 1926
- Torneio Início Paulista: 1927
- Taça Competência: 1920, 1926, 1927

National Team

- Copa América: 1919, 1922

São Paulo State Team

- Campeonato Brasileiro de Seleções Estaduais: 1922, 1923, 1926, 1929
