= Benedicto (footballer) =

Brazilian footballer (1906-1944)

Personal information
- Full name: Benedicto de Moraes Menezes
- Date of birth: 30 October 1906
- Place of birth: Rio de Janeiro, Brazil
- Date of death: 11 February 1944
- Position: Striker

Senior career*
Years	Team	Apps	(Gls)
1924–1926	Brasil de Pelotas	?	(?)
1927–1932	Botafogo	?	(?)
1933	Fluminense	?	(?)
1933–1935	Torino	57	(7)
1935–1939	Lazio	110	(4)

International career
1930–1932	Brazil	3	(1)
- * Club domestic league appearances and goals

Benedicto de Moraes Menezes (30 October 1906 – 11 February 1944) was a Brazilian football player. He played for Brazil national team.

== Honours ==
=== Club ===
- Campeonato Carioca (2):

Botafogo: 1930, 1932
