= Carvalho Leite =

Brazilian footballer (1912–2004)

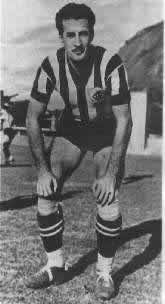
- Carvalho Leite

Personal information
- Full name: Carlos Antônio Dobbert de Carvalho Leite
- Date of birth: 25 June 1912
- Place of birth: Rio de Janeiro, Brazil
- Date of death: 19 July 2004 (aged 92)
- Place of death: Rio de Janeiro, Brazil
- Position: Forward

Senior career*
Years	Team	Apps	(Gls)
1927–1929	Petropolitano	?	(?)
1929–1942	Botafogo	326	(274)

International career
1930–1940	Brazil	10	(7)
- * Club domestic league appearances and goals

Carlos Antônio Dobbert de Carvalho Leite (June 25, 1912 – July 19, 2004), best known as Carvalho Leite was a Brazilian Association footballer who played as a striker.

Leite was born in Rio de Janeiro. In a career that spanned 15 years between 1927 and 1943, Leite played for Petropolitano and Botafogo, winning five Campeonato Carioca titles (1930, 1932, 1933, 1934, 1935) with Botafogo. He was top goalscorer in 1931, 1935, 1936, 1938 and 1939.

Leite was a member of the Brazilian 1930 World Cup squad, being the youngest player of the tournament (a record he held until Pelé debuted at 17 in the 1958 World Cup). He was also a part of the 1934 World Cup squad. He died in July 2004 at the age of 92, by which time he was the last surviving player of the Brazilian 1930 World Cup team.

== Honours ==
=== Club ===
- Campeonato Carioca (5):

Botafogo: 1930, 1932, 1933, 1934, 1935

=== Individual ===
- Campeonato Carioca topscorer (5):

Botafogo: 1931 (13 goal), 1935 (16 goal), 1936 (15 goal), 1938 (16 goal), 1939 (22 goal)
