= 1935 Campeonato Carioca =

In the 1935 season of the Campeonato Carioca, two championships were disputed, each by a different league.

== FMD Championship ==
Campeonato Carioca
- Season: 1935
- Champions: Botafogo
- Matches played: 89
- Goals scored: 400 (4.49 per match)
- Top goalscorer: Ladislau da Guia (Bangu) - 19 goals
- Biggest home win: Vasco da Gama 10-0 Brasil (June 16, 1935)
- Biggest away win: São Cristóvão 2-7 Bangu (June 16, 1935)
- Highest scoring: Vasco da Gama 10-0 Brasil (June 16, 1935); Botafogo 6-4 Carioca (September 22, 1935); Botafogo 6-4 Bangu (November 24, 1935); São Cristóvão 4-6 Botafogo (December 29, 1935)

At the end of 1934, Vasco da Gama had a falling-out with LCF, along with São Cristóvão and Bangu, and after talks with Botafogo, formed a new league; FMD (Federação Metropolitana de Desportos, or Metropolitan Sports Federation), comprising the three former LCF members and many of the members of AMEA, which ceased to exist as a result.

The edition of the Campeonato Carioca organized by FMD kicked off on May 12, 1935 and ended on January 26, 1936. Nine teams participated. However, SC Brasil, under financial trouble, withdrew after losing its first five matches, and on the last rounds of the championship, Carioca, after abandoning the pitch twice, was fined two contos de réis and abandoned the league after that as well. As a consequence, Carioca would be barred from disputing the FMD championship in the next year and would only return in 1937. Botafogo won the championship for the 8th time. no teams were relegated.

=== System ===
The tournament would be disputed in a triple round-robin format, with the team with the most points winning the title.

=== Championship ===
Pos	Team	Pld	W	D	L	GF	GA	GD	Pts	Qualification or relegation
1	Botafogo	22	16	4	2	73	42	+31	36	Champions
2	Vasco da Gama	22	15	4	3	69	22	+47	34	
3	São Cristóvão	22	7	10	5	42	37	+5	24	
4	Andarahy	22	8	7	7	57	53	+4	23	
5	Bangu	22	7	7	8	61	64	−3	21	
6	Madureira	22	6	8	8	34	44	−10	20	
7	Carioca	22	6	4	12	32	47	−15	16	Withdrew
8	Olaria	22	4	2	16	29	65	−36	10	
9	Brasil	8	0	0	8	3	26	−23	0	Withdrew

Updated to match(es) played on January 26, 1936. Source: RSSSF.com
Rules for classification: 1) points; 2) goal difference; 3) wins; 4) number of goals scored.

== LCF Championship ==
Campeonato Carioca
- Season: 1935
- Champions: América
- Matches played: 45
- Goals scored: 226 (5.02 per match)
- Top goalscorer: China (Bonsucesso) – 16 goals
- Biggest home win: Fluminense 9-0 Modesto (September 29, 1935)
- Biggest away win: Portuguesa 1-7 Flamengo (August 25, 1935)
- Highest scoring: Fluminense 5-6 América (October 27, 1935)

The edition of the Campeonato Carioca organized by LCF (Liga Carioca de Football, or Carioca Football League) kicked off on July 21, 1935 and ended on November 10, 1935. Although LCF had lost half of its members, after AMEA's closure, Portuguesa joined LCF, bringing its membership to five teams. The championship now would be among league members and the winner of the previous year's Subliga Carioca de Football, Modesto, as a guest. América won the championship for the 6th time. no teams were relegated.

=== System ===
The tournament would be disputed in a triple round-robin format, with the team with the most points winning the title.

=== Championship ===
Pos	Team	Pld	W	D	L	GF	GA	GD	Pts	Qualification or relegation
1	América	15	11	2	2	49	20	+29	24	Champions
2	Fluminense	15	11	1	3	63	26	+37	23	
3	Flamengo	15	8	4	3	36	22	+14	20	
4	Bonsucesso	15	6	2	7	34	38	−4	14	
5	Modesto (G)	15	2	1	12	19	56	−37	5	
6	Portuguesa	15	2	0	13	25	64	−39	4	

Updated to match(es) played on November 10, 1935. Source: RSSSF.com
Rules for classification: 1) points; 2) goal difference; 3) wins; 4) number of goals scored.
(G) Guests
