= Preguinho =

Brazilian footballer

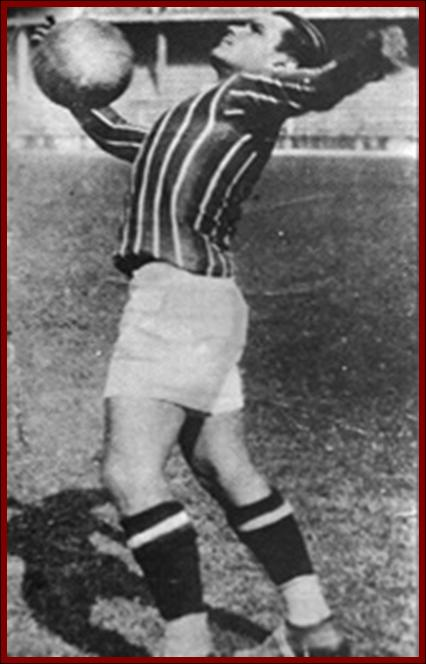
- Preguinho with Fluminense

Personal information
- Full name: João Coelho Neto
- Date of birth: 8 February 1905
- Place of birth: Rio de Janeiro, Brazil
- Date of death: 1 October 1979 (aged 74)
- Place of death: Rio de Janeiro, Brazil
- Height: 1.76 m (5 ft 9 1/2 in)
- Position: Forward

Senior career*
Years	Team	Apps	(Gls)
1925–1938	Fluminense	174	(129)

International career
1930	Brazil	3	(4)
- * Club domestic league appearances and goals

João Coelho Neto, known more commonly as Preguinho (8 February 1905 – 1 October 1979), was a Brazilian footballer who played as a striker.

The son of Brazilian writer Coelho Neto, Preguinho was born in Rio de Janeiro on 8 February 1905. He played from 1925–1938 for Fluminense and scored 184 goals.

For Brazil, he participated in the 1930 FIFA World Cup and was the first captain of the Brazil national team, scoring the first goal ever from Brazil in a FIFA World Cup in a match against Yugoslavia, and two further goals in a match with Bolivia.

He died at the age of 74 on 29 September 1979. In his honour, Fluminense dedicated a statue. A Brazilian TV-programme of his life was produced by Carlos Niemeyer for Canal 100 and directed by Carlos Leonam and Oswaldo Caldeira.

== International goals ==
Brazil's goal tally first

#	Date	Venue	Opponent	Score	Result	Competition
1.	14 July 1930	Estadio Gran Parque Central, Montevideo, Uruguay	Yugoslavia	1–2	1–2	1930 FIFA World Cup
2.	20 July 1930	Estadio Centenario, Montevideo, Uruguay	Bolivia	2–0	4–0	1930 FIFA World Cup
3.	20 July 1930	Estadio Centenario, Montevideo, Uruguay	Bolivia	4–0	4–0	1930 FIFA World Cup
4.	17 August 1930	Estádio das Laranjeiras, Rio de Janeiro, Brazil	United States	3–2	4–3	Friendly
