= History of CR Vasco da Gama =

History of a Brazilian football club

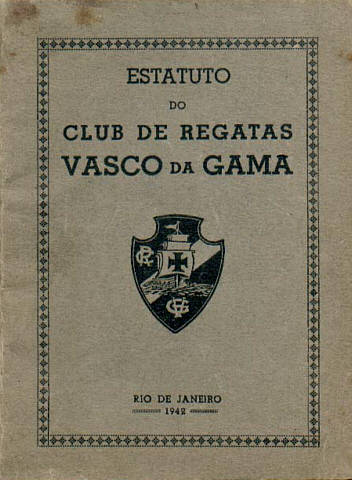
Vasco's Statute, 1942

The history of the Club de Regatas Vasco da Gama begins on August 21, 1898, in the city of Rio de Janeiro, where a group of Portuguese immigrants gathered to form a sports association initially dedicated primarily to aquatic sports, especially rowing.

== Foundation and early activities ==
The foundation of Vasco occurred in the context of the growing popularity of rowing in the late 19th century. The sport gradually gained traction in the final decades of the century, with the increasing use of beaches as recreational spaces and the emergence of a new aesthetic valuing a fit and healthy physique. In 1873, the Club Guanabarense was established, boosting rowing in Rio de Janeiro; several rowing clubs were founded in the following years, and regattas became a regular event in the 1880s and 1890s.

The idea to create a rowing club originated with four young Brazilians—Henrique M. Ferreira Monteiro, Luiz Antonio Rodrigues, José Alexandre d'Avellar Rodrigues, and Manoel Teixeira de Sousa Junior—all clerks working in downtown Rio de Janeiro. (Note: According to the Michaelis Dictionary, caixeiro is an "employee responsible for sales in a commercial establishment; clerk" (http://michaelis.uol.com.br/busca?r=0&f=0&t=0&palavra=caixeiro)) During their free time, the young men rented a rowboat named "Iracema" from the Grupo de Regatas Gragoatá in Niterói. The distance between Rio de Janeiro and Niterói inspired the idea to establish a rowing club in the Saúde neighborhood, where they worked.

A fifth member, Lopes de Freitas, was invited, and the initial meetings took place in January 1898, first in a townhouse where Henrique Ferreira Monteiro lived, at Rua Theóphilo Ottoni, No. 80 (to the left of the current No. 90); later, for better accommodation, the young pioneers were hosted in the hall of the Sociedade Dramática Particular Filhos de Talma. The idea of a new rowing club in the neighborhood was promoted in commercial circles, and the four founders quickly attracted new interested parties. Among those invited to the future institution were the Couto brothers, Portuguese merchants in the steam-powered sawmill business, who had the necessary capital to establish the club in its early stages.

After several preliminary meetings, the club was founded on August 21, 1898, at Rua da Saúde, No. 293 (now No. 345, Rua Sacadura Cabral). (Note: The "Rua da Saúde" no longer exists. The address at Rua Sacadura Cabral, nº 345, is provided by research from Henrique Hübner, former Director of Vasco's Memory Center. See the main text for further references.) At this first meeting, the board was elected, with Francisco Gonçalves Couto Junior as the first president of the club. There were 62 founding members of the institution. (Note: According to the official Vasco website, there are no longer records of the 62 founding members of the club. For this reason, those listed in the club's application for affiliation with the Fluminense Rowing Union on October 24, 1898, are considered the founders. In this document, Vasco listed 187 "founding members" (https://www.netvasco.com.br/n/170556/vasco-divulga-documento-de-1898-com-a-relacao-dos-187-socios-fundadores-do-clube).) The name chosen for the club—Vasco da Gama—was in honor of the IV centenary of the discovery of the maritime route to India, as many of the founders were Portuguese. Thus, the club was named after the Portuguese navigator Vasco da Gama.

The minutes of the foundation meeting recorded:

On the 21st day of August 1898, at 2:30 pm, gathered in the room of the building at Rua da Saúde, No. 293, the gentlemen listed in the attendance book, Mr. Gaspar de Castro assumed the presidency and, after inviting Mr. Virgílio Carvalho do Amaral as the 1st secretary and Mr. Henrique Ferreira as the 2nd secretary, declared that the purpose of this meeting was to found, in the capital of the Republic of the United States of Brazil, an association under the title of Club de Regatas Vasco da Gama (…)

— Foundation minutes

There is no controversy regarding the location where Vasco was founded, as the foundation minutes state that the founders were gathered at the "building at Rua da Saúde, No. 293," an address never occupied by the Filhos de Talma association. However, the notion that Vasco was founded at Filhos de Talma gained traction during the club's 20th anniversary celebration through a text published by the newspaper "O Paiz," perpetuating the myth since then. The club's 60th anniversary was celebrated at Filhos de Talma, where a bronze plaque was placed at its headquarters, stating that the Vasco deliberative council met there on the occasion of the 60th anniversary of the institution, "founded at this location."

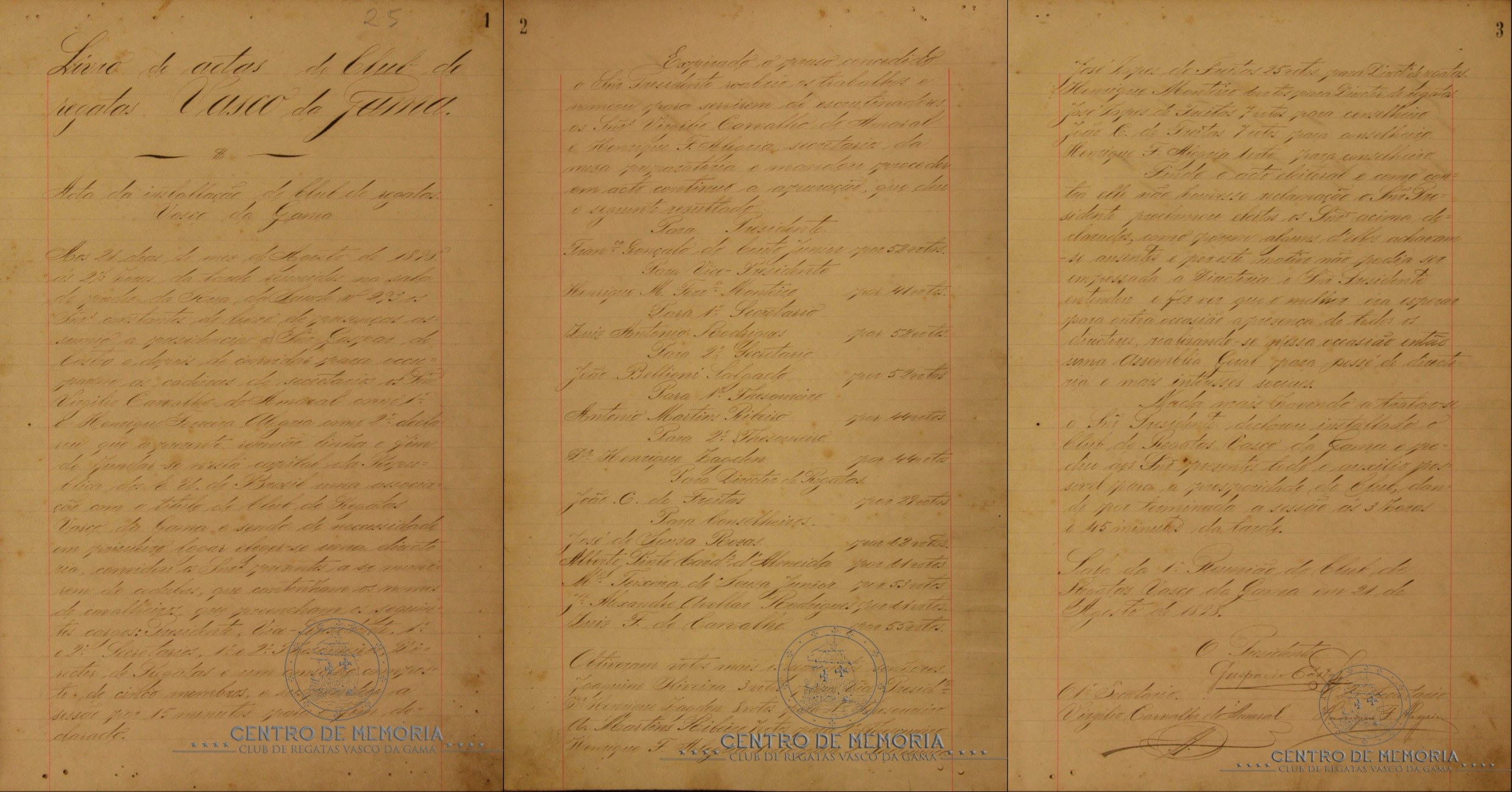
Foundation minutes of the Club de Regatas Vasco da Gama

According to research by Henrique Hübner, former Director of Vasco's Memory Center, the street where Vasco was founded—Rua da Saúde—is now Rua Sacadura Cabral. The street name was changed on June 24, 1922, by a decree from the Rio de Janeiro City Hall. The numbering also changed—in 1907, the City Hall issued Decree No. 664, mandating a revision of street numbering in the city center, including Rua da Saúde. The current number was established in 1909. Hübner concludes that the address where Vasco was founded is now Rua Sacadura Cabral, No. 345. The foundation site is very close to the Filhos de Talma headquarters, with a distance slightly over 100 meters.

In late 2020, a group of Vasco supporters rented the property where the club was founded and restored it. A commemorative plaque was placed at the entrance, featuring the flags of Vasco, Brazil, and Portugal, with the inscription "Here was born the Club de Regatas Vasco da Gama," along with an explanatory text about the historical occasion. Crosses of Christ were also placed at the entrance and in the garage. The intention is to use the site for exhibitions and events about Vasco's history. In an online vote, the name "Cândido José de Araújo Cultural Center" was chosen for the property, honoring Cândido José de Araújo, Vasco's president in 1904 and 1906, and the first black president of a sports club in Brazil.

The first Vasco president was the Portuguese merchant Francisco Gonçalves Couto Junior. Founded by many members of the less affluent classes, the club needed financial support to begin its activities. This support was provided by Couto Junior, who operated in the steam-powered sawmill business. He arranged the rental of Vasco's first temporary headquarters, located near his business, and was responsible for building the club's first shed, used as a garage for the boats.

Eight days after its foundation, the board was sworn in at the hall of Estudantina Arcas, at Rua São Pedro, No. 152, in the former Largo do Capim (now part of Avenida Presidente Vargas, opposite the Central Bank of Brazil headquarters). On the same date, a committee was elected to draft the first statute, which was approved on September 10 of the same year.

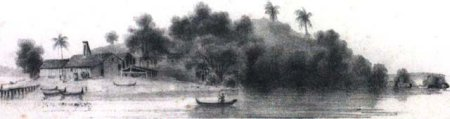
Ilha das Moças, the site of Vasco's first permanent headquarters, in an engraving by Abram-Louis Buvelot (1845).

Once the club was founded, a temporary headquarters was established by renting an old townhouse at Rua da Saúde, No. 127 (now No. 167, Rua Sacadura Cabral), opposite Largo da Imperatriz, now Praça Jornal do Comércio. Today, only the facade of the building that served as Vasco's first headquarters remains standing.

In November 1898, three months after its foundation, the club moved to a permanent headquarters at Praia Formosa, located on Ilha das Moças in an area already filled in with material from the dismantling of Morro do Senado. To facilitate access to the headquarters, Vasco members built a wooden bridge for rowers and a boardwalk for rainy days. Ilha das Moças no longer exists, having been filled in with the completion of the Port of Rio de Janeiro. It is now near the Novo Rio Bus Terminal. The Formosa Beach bordered what is now Rua Pedro Alves, which was filled in and connected to Ilha das Moças with the dismantling of Morro do Senado.

Approximate location of the headquarters on Ilha das Moças in 1898

Plan of the project for the port quay

=== Choice of colors, symbols, and uniforms ===
The first Vasco uniform was chosen on September 6 in a board meeting. At the proposal of the founding president, Francisco Gonçalves Couto Junior, Vasco's first attire was unanimously approved. The minutes of the meeting state that the uniform would consist of a black cap, a black shirt with a collar and a wide white sash, featuring a red Maltese Cross on the chest, half over the white and half over the black. The belt would be white; the shorts of "black cashmere," the socks black, and the shoes white, with the use of shoes and socks "mandatory only during regattas."

According to João Ernesto da Costa Ferreira, former Director of Vasco's Historical Heritage, "the black represents the unknown of the seas, through which the great navigations passed"; the diagonal white sash, from one corner to another, "represented the victorious route of those great Portuguese navigations," as poetically described by Professor Castro Filho, a former club president. The cross symbolized "Christian faith, as many founders were Portuguese, coming from an essentially Christian nation." Mário Filho stated that the black color was chosen over the preferred white shirt because it was "more economical," as "a black shirt looks clean, even if it is dirty."

Although the minutes state that the symbol would be the Maltese Cross, it was actually the Cross of Christ used in Vasco's uniforms. The use of the Cross of Christ was due to its connection with the navigator Vasco da Gama and Portuguese ships: Vasco da Gama was knighted by the Order of Christ, and Portuguese ships bore the Cross of Christ on their sails. During the IV centenary celebrations of the discovery of the maritime route to India, the Cross of Christ was depicted without the white Greek cross (or voided) inside it; in colored representations, the cross was usually shown in red or crimson. This depiction was popularized by the Portuguese painter Alfredo Roque Gameiro in two famous works about the departure of the Portuguese fleet and the arrival in Calicut.

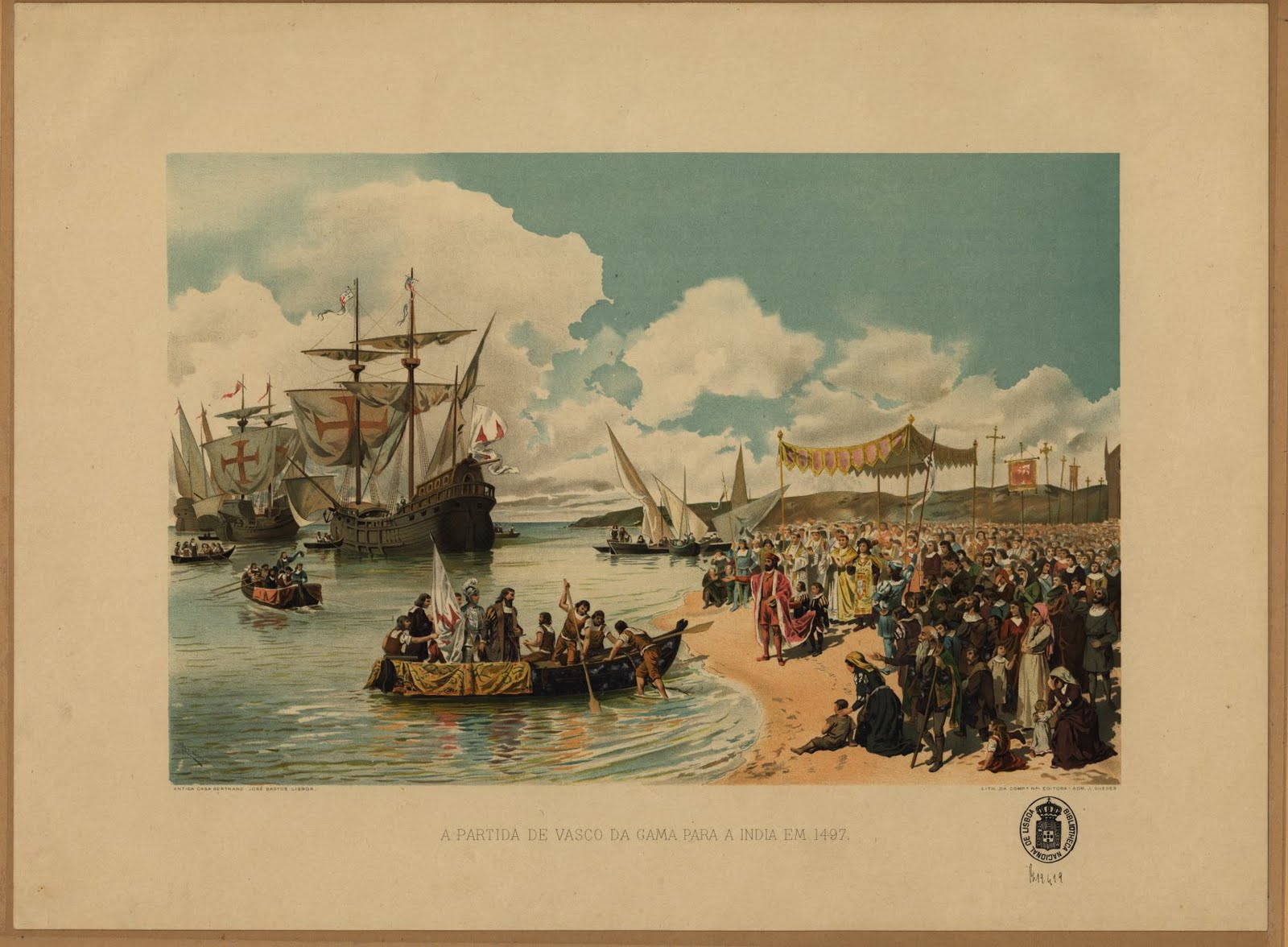
Vasco da Gama's Departure for India in 1497

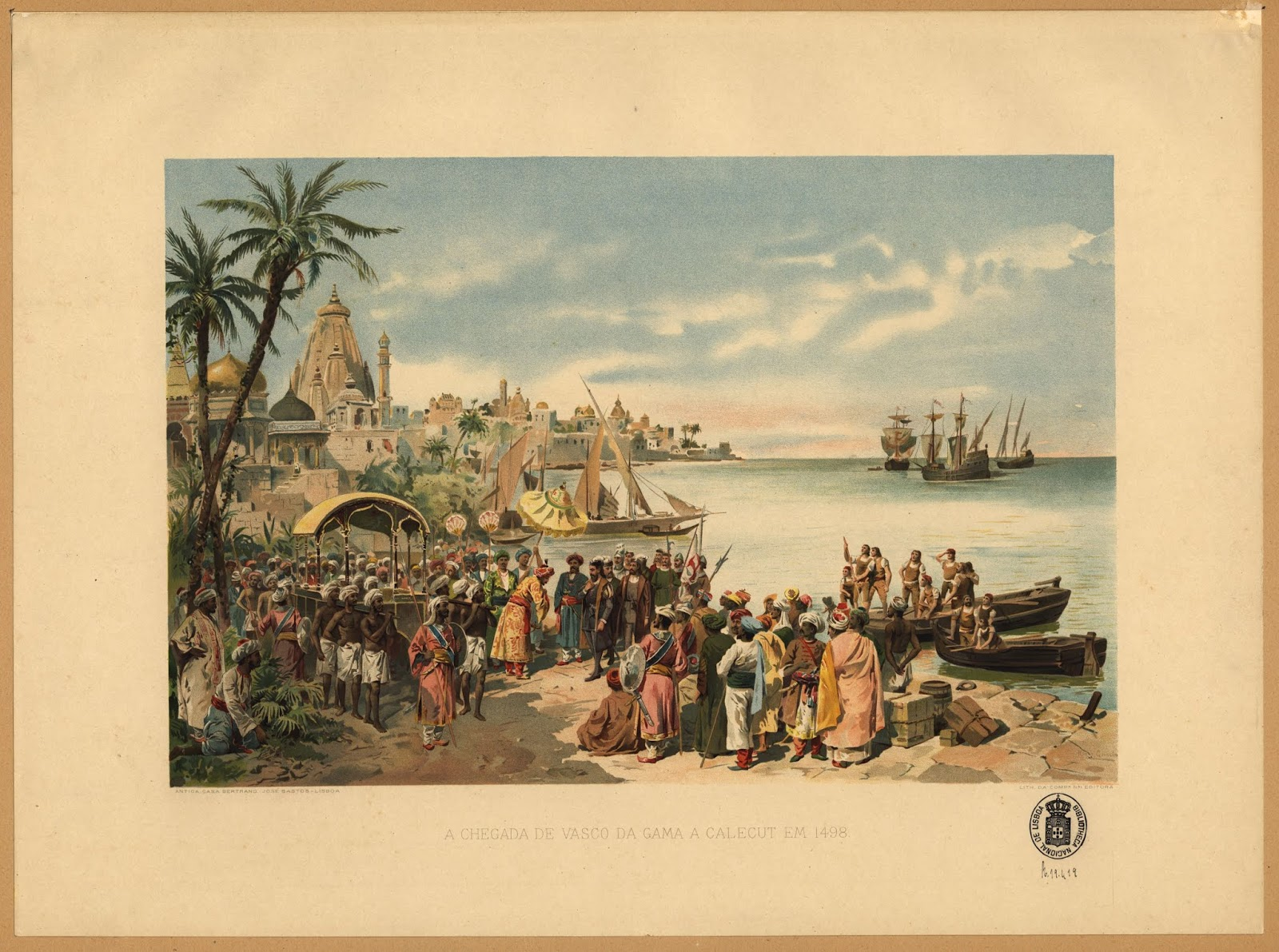
Vasco da Gama's Arrival in Calicut in 1498

Roque Gameiro's engravings for the IV Centenary of the Discovery of the Maritime Route to India

These works inspired the club's choice of the cross—hence the reference in the minutes to the "crimson Maltese Cross." Henrique Hübner, former Director of Vasco's Memory Center, argues that this is a metonymy due to a popular interpretation of the term "Maltese Cross" as a nickname for all heraldic designs of crosses pattée (crosses with open and equal arms). According to Hübner, there are numerous published examples in the press where, unrelated to C.R. Vasco da Gama, the Cross of Christ (proper name) is referred to as the Maltese Cross (nickname).

Cross (of the Order) of Malta (proper name)
Cross pattée (heraldic design)

Cross (of the Order) of Christ (proper name)
Cross of Portugal (proper name – Portuguese national symbol)
Cross pattée (heraldic design)
Maltese Cross (nickname)

Cross Pattée (generic heraldic design)
Maltese Cross (nickname)

Comparison of the Maltese, Christ, and Pattée Crosses

Due to popular tradition, the Maltese Cross became associated with Vasco since its foundation, and the club is often called cruzmaltino. The club's popular anthem, composed by Lamartine Babo, begins by stating, "the Maltese Cross is my flag." In 2010, Vasco launched a third kit that "corrected history," in the club's words, featuring the Cross of Christ.

According to Mário Filho, the white sash was adopted because it was inconceivable to place the Cross of Christ on a black background. The solution was to insert a white sash at the height of the cross. The first Vasco uniform featured a horizontal sash, not a vertical one. The traditional vertical sash was introduced the following year. At a general assembly on July 16, 1899, it was decided that the shirt would be "black with a wide white sash across the shoulder"; in other words, diagonal. Thus, it is not true that Vasco "copied" or was "inspired" by the shirt of River Plate, as it adopted the diagonal sash before the Argentine club was even founded. This notion began with a comparison made by O Globo and became popular, even appearing for a time on the club's official website. Another change concerned the position of the cross: in the original uniform, it was placed half on the black and half on the white of the shirt. In November 1898, in the affiliation document to the Fluminense Regatta Union, the club stipulated that the cross should be centrally positioned on the sash.

The sash on Vasco's traditional uniform typically starts from the left shoulder. However, there is a photographic record of a shirt with the sash starting from the right shoulder in 1900. There are no official records about this shirt; Hübner theorizes that it was used by the boat's coxswain, who faced the opposite direction of the other rowers, so the reverse sash would be symmetrical with the others.

Four days after the meeting that decided the first uniforms, it was unanimously approved in a general assembly that the name and colors of Vasco would be immutable. A few days later, the pennant, usually placed at the bow of the boats, was approved. According to the meeting minutes, the pennant should be made of black silk, "with a white stripe in the center with a crimson cross" and measure 50x10 cm.

== Beginnings in rowing ==
At the temporary headquarters, Vasco established a rowing school, the first in the city of Rio. Classes were held at night, from seven to ten in the evening. The lessons were conducted on a four-oar boat named "Escola," and the route typically consisted of a course from Ilha da Pombeba to the Navy Arsenal on Ilha das Cobras, a route rowed two, three, or even four times a day. According to the newspaper A Noite, the creation of the rowing school significantly increased the number of club members.

On November 3, the club submitted a request for affiliation to the Fluminense Regatta Union. The first boats acquired by the club were "Vera-Cruz," a ten-oar whaleboat; "Volúvel," a six-oar whaleboat; "Vaidosa," a four-oar whaleboat; another four-oar whaleboat; and a four-oar canoe named "Zoca," as well as a four-oar whaleboat under construction.

Already affiliated with the Fluminense Regatta Union, Vasco debuted in official competitions on June 4, 1899, in the Botafogo Bay. There, the six-oar whaleboat "Volúvel" won the first race in the junior category, marking Vasco's first rowing victory. On September 24, 1905, the club won its first Carioca Rowing Championship, with President Rodrigues Alves among the spectators. The following year, Vasco became two-time champions. Until 2012, the club won the rowing championship a total of 46 times.

The structure of Brazilian sports clubs at the time was characterized by elitism, as their members were generally from the elite of Rio's South Zone. Vasco da Gama stood out from these clubs because its base was largely composed of Portuguese merchants and wage earners. In this context, it is noteworthy that in 1904, Vasco's members, in an unprecedented move at the time, elected a mulatto as president, Cândido José de Araújo, who was reelected in 1905. Vasco was the first sports club in the country to elect a non-white president. It was during Araújo's presidency that the club won its first rowing championship.

To begin competing, Vasco purchased three boats: Zoca, a four-oar canoe; Vaidosa, a four-oar whaleboat; and Volúvel, a six-oar whaleboat. All made of cedar wood, they were stored in a garage located at Travessa Maia, which was later eliminated to make way for Avenida Rio Branco. The official competition debut occurred on November 13, 1898.

The first victory came the following year, on June 4, 1899, with Volúvel in the Novos class, in a race named Vasco da Gama in honor of the club. The winning crew consisted of Adriano Vieira (coxswain), José Freitas, José Cunha, José Pereira, Joaquim Campos, Antônio Frazão, and Carlos Rodrigues.

In the same year, the club nearly closed due to a controversy raised by President Francisco Gonçalves do Couto Junior, who intended to move the headquarters to Botafogo Beach. Gonçalves resigned and founded the Clube de Regatas Guanabara, taking most of Vasco's members with him. However, Francisco Gonçalves returned to Vasco's presidency in 1901.

The General Assembly decided to leave Ilha das Moças and move the headquarters to a property near the Passeio Público, located at Travessa do Maia, No. 15, alongside other nautical centers. The Vasco headquarters consisted of two sheds. The first was used for the secretariat, gymnastics school, and receptions, while the second served as a garage for the boats. This headquarters operated until 1905, when the area was demolished by the Rio de Janeiro City Hall, which relocated Vasco to Rua Luiz de Vasconcellos, No. 14, until its definitive transfer to the headquarters at Rua Santa Luzia in 1906.

The year 1900 marked the beginning of a historic rivalry with Flamengo. In the first rowing race in Brazilian history, named 'Club de Regatas Flamengo,' the Vasco boat Visão was the winner. That same year, the club moved to its first owned headquarters: a shed on Ilha das Moças. Ilha das Moças no longer exists, having been filled in with the completion of Avenida Francisco Bicalho. Today, its location is occupied by the Novo Rio Bus Terminal.

On May 18, 1902, a tragedy struck: the twelve-oar whaleboat Vascaína, purchased in 1900, capsized on its way to Icaraí due to strong winds, resulting in the drowning of four rowers. The nine remaining rowers were adrift for three hours on Gragoatá beach until their cries for help were heard by the boy Martins de Barros. Barros alerted fishermen José Joaquim de Aguiar Moreno and Antônio Silveira, who rescued the survivors in their fishing canoe. Due to the canoe's small size, the survivors had to lie face down, stacked on top of each other; one rower had to cling to the bow. For their bravery, Barros and fishermen Moreno and Silveira were honored by the representative of the King of Portugal, D. Carlos. All were awarded honorary membership in the club.

The deceased rowers were Luís Ferreira de Carvalho, (Note: There is some discrepancy regarding the name and spelling of Luís. The Jornal do Brasil, when reporting the event, first refers to Luís as "Luiz Jacintho Ferreira Campos". Later in the same edition, it refers to him as "Ferreira de Carvalho" (edition nº 139, see references). Meanwhile, the magazine "O Sport Nautico", in its June 1, 1902, edition, designates the Vasco member as "Luiz Ferreira de Carvalho". On the other hand, the club's official website, when listing its founding members, refers to "Luís F. Carvalho" (https://www.netvasco.com.br/n/170556/vasco-divulga-documento-de-1898-com-a-relacao-dos-187-socios-fundadores-do-clube). Due to the discrepancy, the form presented on the official website was chosen.) Teodorico Lopes, José Pinto, and Lourenço Seguro, the first two clerks and the latter two merchants. Luís Ferreira was one of Vasco's founding members and, at the time, served as the club's 1st secretary. The seventh-day mass for the rowers was held on May 24 at the Candelária Church. The Jornal do Brasil, reporting on the event, wrote that the nautical sport was "in mourning." Nautical clubs in Rio and Niterói raised their flags at half-mast in mourning for the tragedy.

From the outset, Vasco established itself as a club that broke with the racist legacy inherited from the slavery era. As early as 1904, the club's members, in an unprecedented move among Brazilian sports clubs at the time, elected a mulatto as president, Cândido José de Araújo, who was reelected in 1905.

=== The first rowing title ===
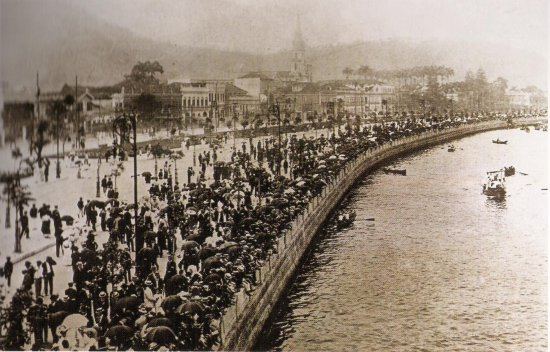
Crowd watching the 1905 Rowing Championship at Botafogo Beach.

In 1905, Vasco won its first rowing championship. The unprecedented title came with five victories and two-second places, with the boats Procellaria (three victories), Açor (one victory), Voga (one victory), Gladiador (one second place), and Albatroz (one second place). The trophy was awarded by the President of the Republic at the time, Rodrigues Alves.

The newspaper Gazeta de Notícias reported the event as follows:

Yesterday, the nautical sport was adorned with splendor with the realization of the Rio de Janeiro Championship regatta, in which the glorious Club de Regatas Vasco da Gama emerged as the gallant winner, seeing its efforts crowned with five brilliant victories, thus being the hero of the day, winning the two most important races, the Championship and the one dedicated to the honorable Dr. Francisco Pereira Passos. All social classes attended to witness the important event, and the beautiful and charming sight presented by the elegant Botafogo beach was remarkable.

(…)

The President of the Republic, with his distinguished family, Cordeiro Graça, Gustavo Braga, the Commission of the Gunboat "PÁTRIA" composed of 1st Lt. D. Lôbo and 2nd Lt. Alvaro Rogan, General Pinheiro Machado, Rear Admiral Alexandrino de Alencar attended the grand nautical festival.

After the arrival of the President of the Republic, Dr. Rodrigues Alves, who traveled on the yacht "SILVA JARDIM" to Botafogo, the ceremony of inaugurating the Pavilion that the City Hall had built to offer to the Brazilian Rowing Societies Federation took place, an act marked by the utmost grandeur.

The races contested by Vasco boats were as follows:

Race	Type	Category	Distance	Boat	Position
1st Race – Club de Regatas Botafogo	Yoles, 2 oars	Seniors	1000m	Gladiador	2nd
4th Race – C. F. C. Jardim Botânico	Yoles, 4 oars	Seniors	2000m	Albatroz	2nd
5th Race – Club de Regatas do Flamengo	Yoles, 8 oars	Juniors	2000m	Procellaria	1st
7th Race – Club de Regatas Boqueirão do Passeio	Canoes, 2 oars	Seniors	1000m	Voga	1st
8th Race – Rio de Janeiro Rowing Championship	Yoles, 8 oars	Veterans	2000m	Procellaria	1st
10th Race – Dr. Francisco Pereira Passos	Yoles, 4 oars	Juniors	1000m	Açor	1st
11th Race – Club de Regatas Vasco da Gama	Yoles, 8 oars	Seniors	2000m	Procellaria	1st

The club went on to win its second consecutive championship by again winning the rowing championship in 1906. During the 1910s, the club won the Carioca Championship three times in a row, in 1912, 1913, and 1914. They won the championship again in 1919. With this, Vasco began a century-long hegemony in Carioca rowing, having only been surpassed as the greatest state champion once in 110 years.

== Expansion ==
In the 1910s, Vasco began to expand its activities and started competing in sport shooting championships. In this sport, it won several titles throughout the decade.

== Football ==
=== Beginnings in the 1910s and 1920s: Pioneering efforts against racism in football ===
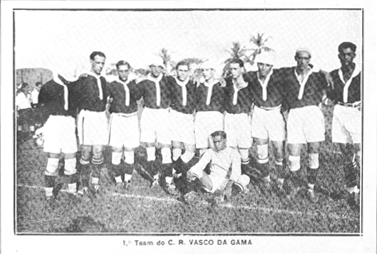
Photo of one of Vasco's first football teams

In the same decade, football began to gain popularity in the city of Rio de Janeiro, and in 1913, Botafogo, which was inaugurating its General Severiano field, invited a Portuguese combined team formed by players from the Portuguese clubs Sporting, Benfica, and Sport Clube Império, in a match won by the visitors 1–0. The arrival of the Portuguese team energized the Portuguese community in Rio de Janeiro, leading to the founding of Portuguese football clubs such as Centro Portuguez de Desportos, Luso, and Lusitânia Sport Club.

Attentive to this movement, the Vasco president at the time, Raul da Silva Campos, himself Portuguese, realized that Vasco could unite the Portuguese community around the club, creating a large cruzmaltino fanbase—a 1920 census showed that nearly 20% of Rio's population was Portuguese. As Vasco did not have a football department, the idea was to incorporate the department of Lusitânia Sport Club.

Lusitânia was a restrictive club that only accepted Portuguese members, preventing it from participating in the Metropolitan League of Athletic Sports. Vasco, on the other hand, accepted both Portuguese and Brazilian members. An agreement between the clubs, signed on November 26, 1915, led to the incorporation of Lusitânia by Vasco, giving rise to Vasco da Gama's football department, despite opposition from Vasco's rowers.

With Lusitânia's incorporation, Vasco began preparing to apply for membership in the Metropolitan League of Athletic Sports. The deadline was tight: the club needed to assemble its team and raise the necessary funds for the application by March 10, when the registration period closed. According to Mário Filho, the Vasco team was formed with two players from Lusitânia and several "mulattos and blacks that Vasco picked up from street games, small clubs, already formed." Vasco submitted its affiliation request to the LMSA on February 23. On the same day, at a League meeting, the request was approved, and Vasco was declared affiliated with the Metropolitan League, eligible to compete in the 3rd division of the Carioca Championship. To join the sports league, the club had to collect funds among its members to raise the 500,000 réis needed for membership.

For team training, Vasco used a field at the now-extinct Praia do Russel. Praia do Russel was an extension of Flamengo Beach, located opposite Hotel Glória, and disappeared with the creation of the Flamengo Park in the 1960s. For official matches, the General Severiano Stadium of Botafogo was rented. The first friendly match played by the Vasco team was against Clube de Regatas Boqueirão do Passeio, a 2nd Division team of the Metropolitan League. The match, held on February 25, ended in an 8–0 defeat for Vasco. Vasco also played friendlies against Cattete Football Club (2nd Division), which ended in a draw, and Parc Royal Foot-Ball Club (3rd Division), with a 2–1 Vasco victory.

Vasco's debut in the Carioca Championship was on May 3, 1916, at General Severiano, against Paladino Foot-Ball Club. Vasco lost the match 10–1. The Vasco goal was scored by the Portuguese Adão Antonio Brandão, a versatile athlete who also competed in other sports for Vasco. Brandão later became a benefactor of the club, and his name is featured in Vasco's press room. Vasco's start in the state tournament was disastrous: the team lost 9–0 to Sport Club Brasil in its second match and 4–0 to Associação Athletica Icarahy, totaling 19 goals conceded and only 1 goal scored in the first three matches. The squad improved after the third match, conceding only 9 goals in the next seven matches. However, this improvement was not enough to avoid finishing the championship in last place. In 10 games, Vasco had 9 losses and 1 victory, scoring 10 goals and conceding 32. At the end of the competition, midfielder João Lamego was selected for the championship's team, and right midfielder Victorino Silva was chosen as a reserve.

Despite finishing last, a reform in the Metropolitan League's structure—renamed the Metropolitan League of Land Sports (LMDT)—allowed Vasco to ascend to the 2nd Division in 1917. Vasco spent six years in the 2nd Division until winning it and earning promotion to the 1st Division in 1922.

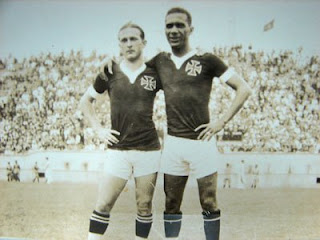
Itália and Fausto, highlights at São Januário.

In 1919, Vasco began recruiting players from Rio's suburbs, incorporating players of any ethnic origin, provided they knew how to play football. The 1919 team's core came from Engenho de Dentro Atlético Clube, the main club in the Rio de Janeiro Suburban Football Championship, a competition among suburban Rio teams. Engenho de Dentro was the reigning Suburban Championship champion, having also won in 1916 and 1917. Four players from Engenho were signed by Vasco, including Esquerdinha, voted the best player in the suburban league by readers of the newspaper Gazeta Suburbana.

The transfer of these players to Vasco was criticized by Gazeta Suburbana. During the Torneio Início Carioca, where these players debuted in Vasco's shirt, the newspaper expressed disbelief, questioning whether the athletes would abandon "their glorious club to play for a club foreign to them, like Vasco." The newspaper also sarcastically remarked: "THEY SAY... that Vasco intends to buy Engenho de Dentro." In the same edition, the newspaper accused Aquiles Pederneiras, a player from Engenho, of encouraging other players to join Vasco. The accusation was reinforced in the next edition: a letter sent to the newspaper accused the player of acting as "Vasco’s sports director," "seducing" Engenho players to join Vasco and promising "what he is not competent to deliver." Contextualizing the letter, the newspaper mentioned "disguised professionalism," implicitly accusing Vasco of offering salaries to Engenho players, a practice forbidden at the time, as amateurism prevailed in Carioca football. A week later, the newspaper suggested that Vasco had paid the players ten contos (10:000$), an amount historian João Manuel Casquinha called "extremely high" and impossible to confirm.

With the reinforcement of suburban league players, Vasco was dubbed by the press as the "scratch of the Suburban League" and was considered the favorite to win the title. Vasco led the championship at one point but had a weak finish, with only one victory in the last five games, resulting in a fifth-place finish. In 1920, Vasco retained the 1919 team's core, with some additions, notably Jayme Fructuoso, who came from Andarahy, a 1st Division team. It was the first time Vasco reinforced its squad with a 1st Division player. Vasco's team was regarded by the press as the strongest in the 2nd Division, alongside the reigning champion Carioca Esporte Clube. Vasco and Carioca finished at the top of the table, and a match between the two was scheduled to decide promotion to the 1st Division. Carioca won 2–0.

In 1922, Vasco decided to also recruit players already playing in the 1st Division. Albanito Nascimento and Claudionor Correa from Bangu, and Braulio from Andarahy, were signed. From the suburbs, Paschoal came from S.C. Rio de Janeiro, a 2nd Division team. With this squad, the team won its first title by securing Série B of the First Division, earning the opportunity to play in the First Division of the Metropolitan League of Land Sports (LMDT). The club's campaign, with eleven wins, two draws, and one loss, was described by Correio da Manhã as "brilliant." The final match was against Palmeiras Atlético Clube, with a 5–0 Vasco victory.

In early 1923, the performance of Vasco in the Torneio Início Carioca was controversial, marked by the aggression of players Negrito and Bolão towards the referee during a match against Mackenzie. According to the newspaper Correio da Manhã, the referee was also booed by the fans. The incident, as reported by the newspaper, compromised "the good name of the club". Vasco won the first match against São Cristóvão by 2–0, but was eliminated from the tournament after losing to Mackenzie by 2–1.

Although there were other teams with similar player profiles (for example, Bangu), this was the first time that the more elitist teams in the city were challenged by a team from the suburbs. The championship-winning team of 1923 included several black players, such as taxi driver Nelson da Conceição, dockworker Nicolino, wall painter Ceci, and truck driver Bolão, in addition to four illiterate white players.

The "elite" clubs could not tolerate seeing their teams defeated by a club composed of black and poor players, which did not even own a stadium. Accusations of unprofessionalism arose, along with claims that illiterate players should not be allowed to compete. As a result, Vasco paid teachers to teach its players how to sign the match scoresheet.

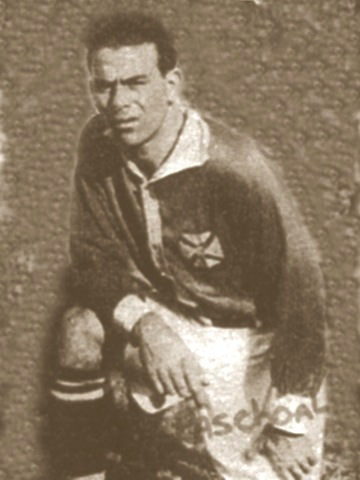
Paschoal, a forward for Vasco between 1922 and 1932.

Despite facing united opposition from other clubs, Vasco defeated America and Fluminense, winning the championship, in its debut year in the first division, on August 12, 1923, leaving Clube de Regatas Flamengo in second place. This achievement significantly marked the history of the club, Rio de Janeiro, and Brazil, as it was the first championship won by a team with Afro-descendant, poor, and working-class players. Rui Proença, a Portuguese-born individual who settled in Rio, described the event as a true revolution, emphasizing the prejudices and difficulties Vasco initially faced, particularly as Flamengo, Fluminense, and Botafogo did not allow black players in their clubs. The author concludes that the club represented a unity between black and Portuguese communities, discriminated groups that, together, built Vasco.

The defeats suffered by Vasco's rivals during the competition were deemed unacceptable, and opponents soon began alleging that Vasco's squad was composed of individuals with "questionable professions" and that the club lacked a stadium to exclude it from the championship. At the time, Vasco's small field, located at Rua Moraes e Silva, 261, in Tijuca, was only suitable for training.

The camisas pretas – a nickname given to Vasco's players due to their uniform – won match after match, often turning the scoreline in the second half due to the excellent physical conditioning of the players, until they clinched the championship. This physical conditioning was highlighted by the Jornal do Brasil in Vasco's victory over Fluminense by 2–1: according to the newspaper, the victory was due to Vasco's "state of training," which ensured "endurance for more than four half-times".

Vasco's victory over Fluminense brought the team very close to the title, opening a seven-point lead over the second-placed Flamengo, with two games remaining for Vasco and four for Flamengo. Since a victory was worth two points at the time, unlike the current three-point system, Vasco could only lose the championship if it was defeated in its next two games and Flamengo won all four of its remaining matches. The improbability of this combination of results led the newspaper O Paiz to declare Vasco the champion, despite the remaining games.

The tricolor defeat sparked controversy in the sports press of the time: the newspaper Correio da Manhã accused the Fluminense team of deliberately losing the match to harm their rival Flamengo. According to Correio da Manhã, Fluminense "had to lose because that was decreed," and the club "never misses an opportunity to mock its neighbor to the right." The "neighbor to the right" referred to Flamengo, as at the time, the red-and-black team played at the Estádio da Rua Paysandu, located in the Laranjeiras neighborhood, very close to the tricolor stadium. In a further accusatory tone, the newspaper stated that Fluminense "did not hesitate to facilitate" Vasco's task. In describing the match, the newspaper highlighted Vasco's overwhelming dominance throughout the game, stating that never had such "pressure, such weakness of one team against the uncontested power of the enemy" been witnessed. According to the outlet, Fluminense "did nothing but retreat, always retreat," and Vasco exerted a "terrifying dominance," describing the match as "a game from start to finish." The article concluded that the game "was neither good nor exciting," characterized by "monotony" and Vasco's dominance. In contrast, the newspaper O Paiz presented a very different scenario: the outlet described the encounter as "brilliant," of "extraordinary prominence and an exciting unfolding." O Paiz disagreed with Correio da Manhã’s analysis of Fluminense’s performance, stating that both teams "fought titanically," that Fluminense did not lose spirit after Vasco’s first goal, and that the first half was balanced and "full of exciting moments".

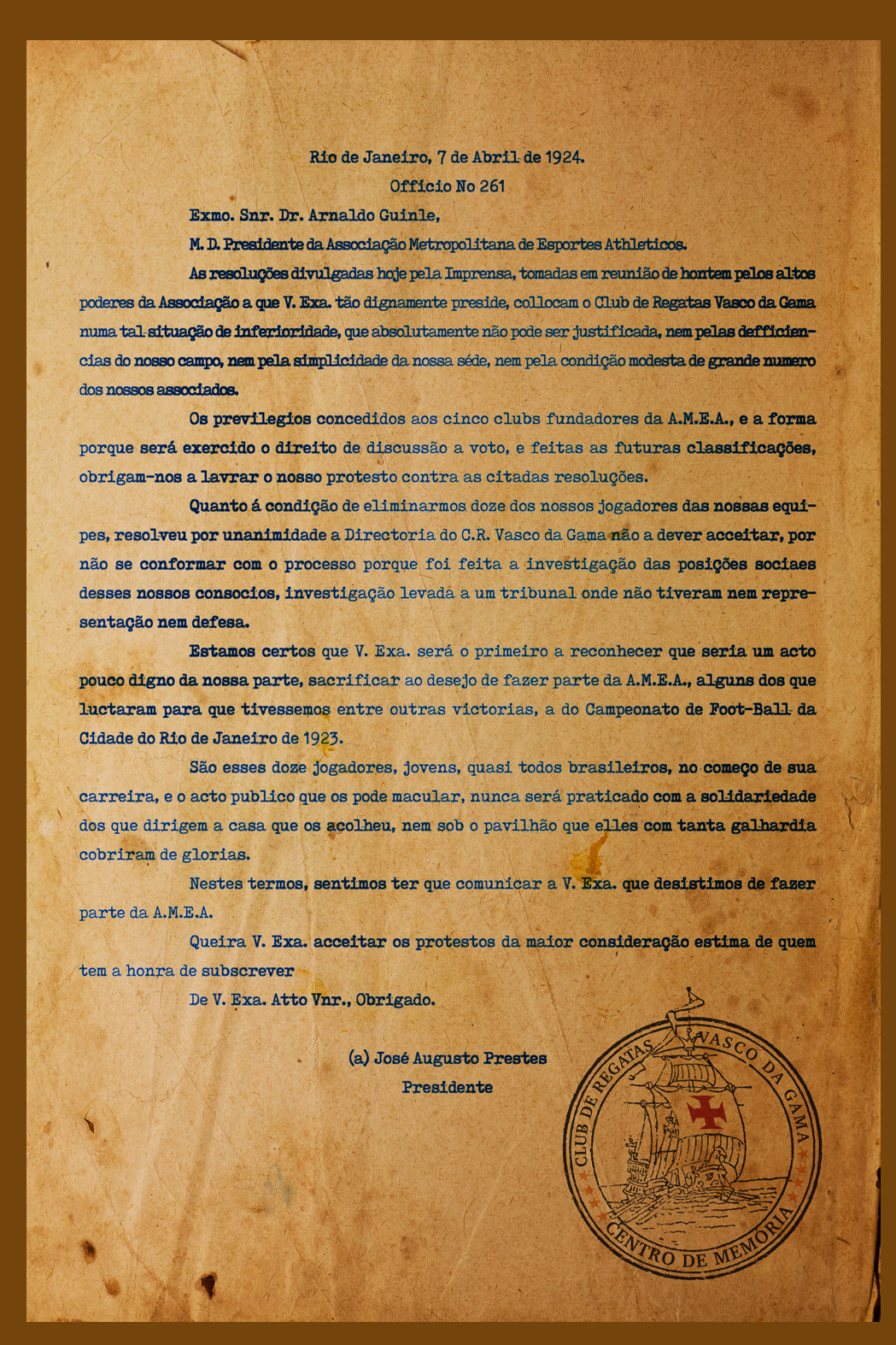
Resposta Histórica, a symbol of Vasco da Gama's anti-racist struggle.

The long-awaited Carioca title came on August 12, with a 3–2 victory against São Cristóvão, at the General Severiano stadium, which was filled to maximum capacity. The victory was achieved with a comeback, as was typical for the cruzmaltino team that season; Vasco had been trailing 2–0, scoring three goals in the second half. The comeback was described as "marvelous" by the newspaper A Noite; both A Noite and Jornal do Brasil praised the match, stating that the contest was "magnificent" and "full of great moments" (A Noite), as well as a "well-fought game" and of "extraordinary proportions" (Jornal do Brasil). Vasco's championship victory was lauded by Jornal do Brasil: the newspaper wrote that Vasco won the 1st Division "brilliantly" and that the club should be proud of the "splendid campaign it conducted in the city’s premier division". After the Carioca Championship concluded, three Vasco players were called up to play in the 1923 South American Championship for the Brazilian national team: Nélson (goalkeeper), Torterolli (right midfielder), and Paschoal (right winger).

Following the failed attempt to exclude Vasco da Gama from the competition in 1923, the clubs from the south zone (the elite area of the city of Rio de Janeiro), Botafogo, Flamengo, Fluminense, and some other clubs found a solution to rid themselves of Vasco in the following year. They united, abandoned the Metropolitan Land Sports League (LMDT), and founded the Metropolitan Athletic Sports Association (AMEA), excluding Vasco, which could only join the new entity if it dismissed twelve of its players (all black) under the accusation that they had "questionable professions." Faced with this imposed condition, in 1924, the president of Club de Regatas Vasco da Gama, José Augusto Prestes, sent a letter to AMEA, which became known as the "Resposta Histórica," (Historical Response) refusing to comply with the condition and withdrawing from joining AMEA. The letter became a landmark in the fight against racism in football.

Rio de Janeiro, 7 April 1924.
Official letter no. 261
Honorable Dr. Arnaldo Guinle
President of the Metropolitan Athletic Sports Association
The resolutions published today in the press, taken at yesterday's meeting by the high powers of the Association that Your Excellency so worthily presides, place Club de Regatas Vasco da Gama in such a position of inferiority that it cannot be justified either by the deficiency of our field, the simplicity of our headquarters, or the modest condition of a large number of our members.
The privileges granted to the five founding clubs of AMEA and the manner in which the right to discussion and voting will be exercised, and future classifications made, compel us to lodge our protest against the aforementioned resolutions.
As for the condition of removing twelve (12) of our players from our teams, the board of Club de Regatas Vasco da Gama unanimously resolves not to accept it, as we do not agree with the process by which the investigation of the social positions of these members was conducted, investigations carried out in a tribunal where they had neither representation nor defense.
We are certain that Your Excellency will be the first to recognize that it would be an undignified act on our part to sacrifice, for the sake of affiliating with AMEA, some of those who fought to secure, among other victories, the football championship of the city of Rio de Janeiro in 1923.
These twelve players are young, almost all Brazilian, at the beginning of their careers, and a public act that could tarnish them will never be carried out with the solidarity of those who lead the institution that welcomed them, nor under the flag that they, with such gallantry, covered with glory.
In these terms, we regret to inform Your Excellency that we withdraw from joining AMEA.
Please accept the expressions of consideration and esteem from one who has the honor to subscribe, Your Excellency's attentive and obliged servant.
(a) Dr. José Augusto Prestes.
President.

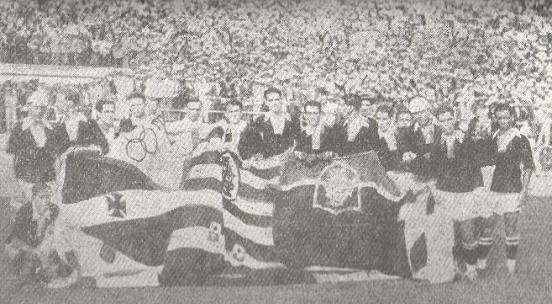
Vasco's squad celebrating the club's inclusion in AMEA in 1927. The flags represent the ten teams affiliated with the federation at the time.

Thus, in 1924, two parallel championships were held, with the LMDT championship won undefeated by Vasco, thus winning the state championship for the second time in a row.

The following year, the club overcame AMEA's resistance, managed to join the entity, and returned to compete in the championship against the major teams under the condition of playing its matches at the Andarahy field. Despite this, Vasco decided to build its own stadium to eliminate any such requirements. The chosen location for the construction was the São Januário estate, a gift from Dom Pedro I to the Marchioness of Santos.

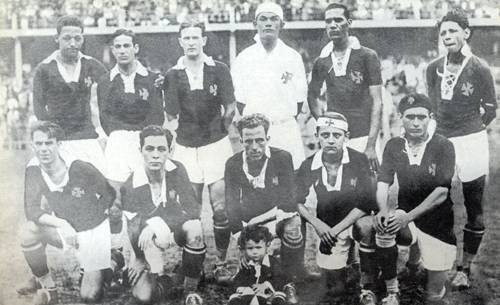
1929: Tinoco, Brilhante, Itália, Jaguaré, Fausto, and Mola; Paschoal, Oitenta-e-Quatro, Russinho, Mário Mattos, and Santana.

In 1926, the club won its first Torneio Início Carioca and repeated the feat in 1929.

On April 21, 1927, Vasco da Gama inaugurated the São Januário, which, until 1930, when the Centenario Stadium in Montevideo was inaugurated (for the first World Cup), was the largest in the Americas. Until 1940, when the Pacaembu in São Paulo was inaugurated, it was the largest in Brazil, and until 1950, with the inauguration of the Maracanã, it was the largest in Rio de Janeiro. The stadium was built in ten months with funds raised through the "Ten Thousand Campaign," which collected donations from fans across the city. Two years later, its lighting was inaugurated, making Vasco the only club in the country with a stadium capable of hosting night games.

In 1929, in addition to the Torneio Início, Vasco won its third Carioca Football Championship in seven years in the elite.

=== The 1930s ===
In the first Carioca Championship of the decade, Vasco was knocked out of the title race in a match against Syrio e Libanez, due to the defender Aragão, who used a boot with steel plates in the toe. Although the fact was discovered, the match was not canceled, and the camisas pretas were left out of the title race.

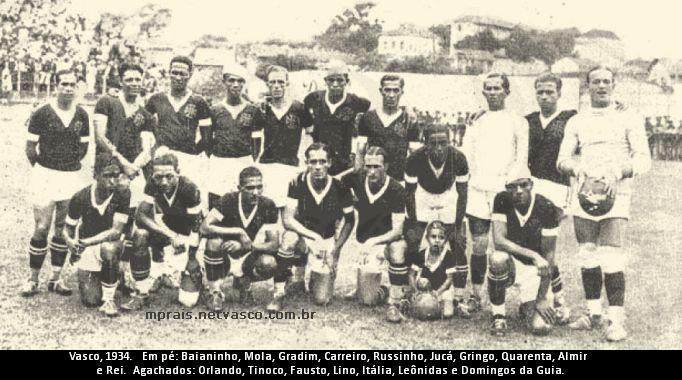
1934: Baianinho, Mola, Gradim, Carreiro, Russinho, Jucá, Gringo, Quarenta, Almir, and Rei; Orlando, Tinoco, Fausto, Lino, Itália, Leônidas, and Domingos da Guia.

To compensate Vasco fans, that year the team inflicted the biggest defeat ever suffered by Fluminense: 6–0.

In the second half of the year, Vasco faced the Argentine team Huracán at its stadium, winning the match 5–1. The victory was described by the newspaper A Noite as a "beautiful triumph" and "one of the most brilliant international achievements" of the club.

In 1931, Vasco began the season regarded by the press as the favorite to win the Carioca championship. However, in the final round, with a one-point lead over America, the team lost 3–0 to Botafogo, while America defeated Bonsucesso 3–1, securing the title. In this championship, another historic thrashing occurred: 7–0 against rival Flamengo, one of the biggest defeats ever suffered by the red-and-black team. Vasco's superiority throughout the match was so great that the Jornal dos Sports compared the encounter to a "training session," stating that Vasco "did not exert effort beyond that of a practice," and that the Vasco players appeared disinterested and unmotivated in the face of their opponents’ weakness. For the newspaper, it felt as though it was a match between a first-division team and a "weak lower-division contender".

After the championship, Vasco became the second Brazilian team to be invited for an international tour (Paulistano was the first). The destinations were Spain and Portugal. They played 12 matches, achieving eight wins, one draw, and three losses, scoring 45 goals for and 18 against.

The consequences of the fine performance came soon after: Fausto and Jaguaré were signed by Barcelona, one of the teams that played against Vasco.

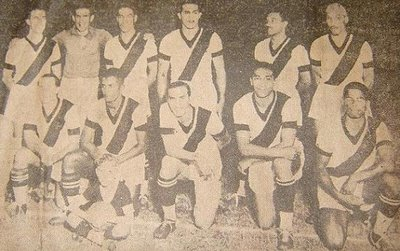
1938: Poroto, Rei, Zé Luiz, Calocero, Rapha, and Zarzur; Lindo, Alfredo I, Niginho, Feitiço, and Luna.

In 1933, an old controversy resurfaced in the country: the debate over the professionalization of sports. The Brazilian Sports Confederation (CBD), now the CBF), advocated for amateurism, while most clubs pushed for professionalization. Due to these disagreements, the Carioca Football League was created. The only exception among the major clubs was Botafogo, which decided to remain in AMEA. In the same year, Vasco and America played the first professional match in the State of Rio de Janeiro and the second in the country, with a Vasco victory by 2–1. The first professional goal in the state was scored by Francisco de Souza Ferreira, better known as Gradim, who later became a Vasco coach and was responsible for bringing Roberto Dinamite, the club's greatest idol, to the youth academy.

In 1934, Vasco, with a star-studded squad including Leônidas da Silva, Domingos da Guia, Fausto (returning from Barcelona), Itália, and others, won the Carioca Championship again. However, the most significant event of that year was another matter.

Due to a dispute with Flamengo, Vasco abandoned the league and, together with Botafogo, created the Metropolitan Sports Federation (FMD). Ironically, the club that had fought so hard for the professionalization of sports switched sides and supported the new league, which was affiliated with the CBD, a defender of amateurism.

The reconciliation among Carioca clubs only occurred in 1937 when, thanks to the initiative of Pedro Pereira Novaes and Pedro Magalhães Corrêa, presidents of Vasco and America respectively, the Rio de Janeiro Football League was created, uniting all Carioca clubs. To celebrate the event, the two teams faced each other on the field on July 31, with record-breaking revenue. This match became known as the "Clássico da Paz".

=== 1940s: Vargas Era and the Expresso da Vitória ===
During the administration of President Getúlio Vargas, he often delivered his main speeches at the São Januário, then the largest stadium in Rio de Janeiro.

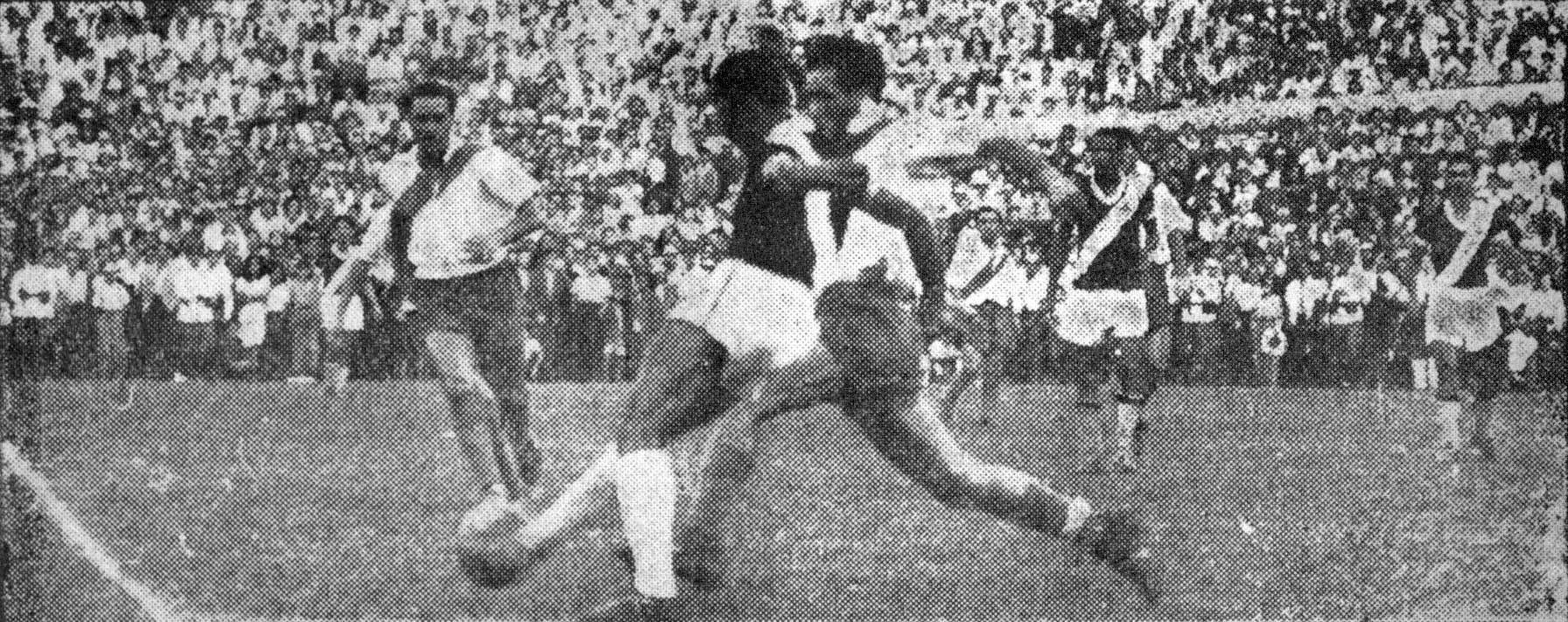
Expresso da Vitória, undefeated champion over River Plate, becoming the first South American champion.

In 1940, Vasco won the Luís Aranha Cup, competing against San Lorenzo and Independiente, both from Argentina. After this title, the team went through a considerable period without winning anything until the formation of a great team: the "Expresso da Vitória," an almost unbeatable team at the time. Its success was so great that Vasco used a B-team, called Expressinho, to tour Brazil. The nickname reportedly originated in a talent show on Rádio Nacional, where a contestant dedicated a song to the club and referred to it by this name.

The Expresso began to take shape when the board hired Uruguayan coach Ondino Viera to end the title drought. Vieira brought in young and unknown players such as Augusto, Eli, Danilo, Ademir, Lelé, Isaías, and Jair. With these players, the foundation of the Expresso was formed. Vasco then began to achieve significant results. In 1944, it won the Torneio Relâmpago, defeating the five major teams of the time (Flamengo, Fluminense, América, and Botafogo). Subsequently, it won the Torneio Municipal against the same clubs and others from Rio de Janeiro. In the following year's Carioca Championship, the team exhibited a formidable performance. Several thrashings, such as a 9–0 victory over Bonsucesso, the biggest thrashing of the championship, and a 2–2 draw with Flamengo were enough to secure the title undefeated.

In 1946, a significant loss occurred: Ademir moved to Fluminense. As Fluminense’s coach Gentil Cardoso had said, "Give me Ademir, and I’ll give you the championship," Fluminense indeed won the Carioca that year. To compensate Vasco fans, the club won the Torneio Relâmpago and the Torneio Municipal again.

In 1947, Vasco formed a formidable attack: Djalma, Maneca, Friaça, Lelé, and Chico. They scored 40 goals in just 10 matches and 68 goals in total over 20 matches. The team also inflicted the biggest thrashing in the professional era of Carioca football: 14–1 against Canto do Rio. Vasco then won the title undefeated again, seven points ahead of the second-placed Botafogo.

In 1948, Ademir returned to the team. That year, Vasco was invited to participate, as the state champion, in the South American Club Championship. Alongside Vasco, major powers of the time were present, such as River Plate led by Di Stéfano, nicknamed La Máquina in Argentina and the favorite to win the title, as well as Nacional from Uruguay and Colo-Colo from Chile.

After four wins and one draw, the final match was against River Plate. A draw was enough for Vasco, which was without Ademir, who was injured in the first match of the tournament. It was a tense match. Goalkeeper Barbosa shone again, saving a penalty from Labruna in the final moments. The referee also disallowed a legitimate Vasco goal in the first half. The match ended in a 0–0 draw, and Vasco was crowned South American champion, the club's greatest title until the Libertadores victory in 1998.

In 1949, Vasco signed striker Heleno de Freitas, who returned to Brazil after an unremarkable season at Boca Juniors. In May, the team faced the English club Arsenal in a highly anticipated match in the capital. Arsenal had been the English champion the previous year, and it was believed at the time that they played a level of football not yet achieved by Brazilian teams. Their results in Brazil seemed to confirm this: three matches, with two London victories and one draw, including a resounding 5–1 thrashing of Fluminense.

The match was surrounded by great expectations due to Arsenal's stature – the newspaper O Globo stated that the team was "the greatest team that had ever visited Brazil," while A Noite claimed that the London team was "the most famous team in the world". – and because Vasco was considered the best team in Rio de Janeiro and one of the best in Brazil. The match, held at Estádio de São Januário, was attended by the Vice-President of the Republic, Nereu Ramos, who was acting President at the time, as well as the British Ambassador and his wife, and an estimated 60,000 spectators, a record unofficial attendance for the stadium to this day. According to A Noite, "chaos reigned inside and outside the stadium," with the stadium gates being broken down. The revenue generated from the crowd was the highest recorded in Brazil and South America at the time.

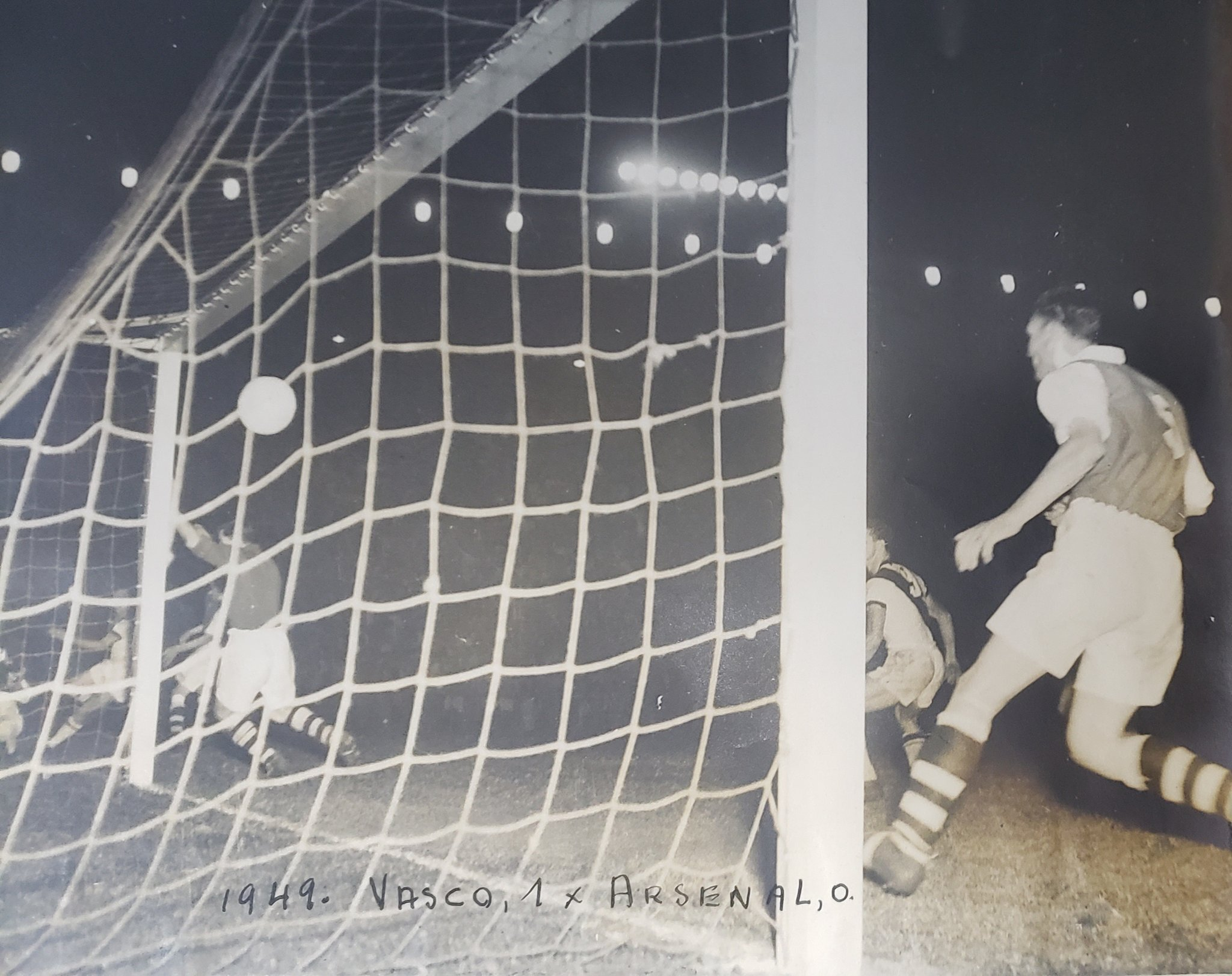
Image capturing the moment of Vasco's goal against Arsenal.

Vasco won the match 1–0, and their performance was praised by the English coach, Tom Whittaker, who stated that "Vasco is a team that greatly honors the high standard of Brazilian football, undoubtedly one of the most brilliant in the world". The Vasco victory was widely celebrated by the Brazilian press. A Noite reported that Vasco, "renowned in so many international battles, on national and foreign fields (...) demolished the fortress," referring to Arsenal's defensive sector, stating that the team performed "magnificently, as we had never witnessed before". The newspaper described the victory as an "extraordinary feat (...) surpassing the masters of football," noting that the match marked an "unforgettable page" in Brazilian football. The newspaper O Fluminense called the night "memorable" and Vasco the "glorious guardian of Brazilian football traditions". For O Globo, "it was the greatest sporting spectacle ever held in Rio to date".

At the end of the year, Vasco was crowned Carioca champion, with a series of thrashings. They scored 84 goals in 20 matches, a record for the time. Flamengo, which had not beaten Vasco since 1944, suffered again against the hill team. At Gávea, the red-and-blacks took a 2–0 lead and considered victory assured. However, Vasco came back in the second half and turned the score to 5–2. In the end, another undefeated title, Vasco's fourth.

=== The 1950 tragedy and the dismantling of the Expresso ===
In 1950, the year of the World Cup, Brazil was preparing for an expected first world title. Vasco had a strong presence in the national team, starting with the Brazilian coach: Flávio Costa, also Vasco’s coach. Of the starting lineup, five players were from Vasco: Barbosa, Augusto, Danilo, Chico, and Ademir. This led to significant criticism of Flávio Costa, who was accused of favoring Vasco players over others in the national team selection.

However, Uruguay became champion on July 16. A deafening silence fell over the Maracanã. Later, a Vasco player became the scapegoat for the defeat: goalkeeper Barbosa. Having failed on the first goal (one of the few serious mistakes in his career) and, it is believed, primarily because he was black, Barbosa was widely blamed by the public and critics for the result.

Despite the setback, Barbosa persevered and led Vasco to another Carioca title in 1950. Right from the start, a 6–0 victory over São Cristóvão. Several more thrashings followed, such as 7–2 against Bonsucesso and 7–0 against Canto do Rio, and in the final, against América, a 2–1 victory secured the trophy.

In 1951, the Expresso began to show signs of fatigue. The team finished seventh in the Torneio Rio-São Paulo and fifth in the Carioca.

The following year saw a comeback. With coach Gentil Cardoso, Vasco finished second in the Rio-São Paulo and won the Carioca again in advance, defeating Bangu 2–1. In that match, Ademir's successor in the attack debuted: Vavá, who would become known as the Leão da Copa in 1962.

Thus ended the Expresso da Vitória, still considered the greatest squad in Vasco's history.

==== More achievements after the Expresso da Vitória ====
In 1953, it was time for renewal, and stars such as Vavá (since 1952), Bellini, Sabará, and Pinga were incorporated into the winning squad. The year could not have started better, with the unbeaten conquest of the Rio de Janeiro International Quadrangular Tournament, where in the final match they thrashed Flamengo by a score of 5–2, securing another South American title for Vasco. In April, the Gigante da Colina won its third unbeaten international tournament, the Santiago International Tournament, defeating the Colombian team Millonarios 2–1 and the Chilean Colo-Colo 2–0. In July, another unbeaten international title followed, the Torneio Octogonal Rivadavia Correa Meyer, held between June 7 and July 4 in São Paulo and Rio de Janeiro. This competition succeeded the Copa Rio of 1952, with a new name, format, regulations, and its own history, with different sponsors, named Torneio Octogonal Rivadavia Correa Meyer in honor of the president of the Brazilian Sports Confederation. Once again, the Gigante da Colina emerged as an international champion. The tournament was so significant that it was officially organized by the CBD, with the support of FIFA official Ottorino Barassi. However, for the 1953 Rivadávia Tournament, newspapers of the time record Barassi's involvement only in recruiting the Italian representative, which could have been Juventus, Internazionale, or Milan (with no mention of him recruiting clubs from other countries). It was treated in Europe as an edition of the Copa Rio, and was coveted by the four major Rio de Janeiro clubs. In the 1957 Tournoi de Paris, Vasco made history as the first and only non-European club to defeat a UEFA Champions League champion. It had a Technical Committee, the referees were all from FIFA's roster, and the four major Rio clubs sought to participate: Vasco and Botafogo qualified for the competition through their positions in the 1953 Rio-São Paulo Tournament, and when Nacional de Montevideo (Uruguay) announced it would no longer participate (due to a ban by the Uruguayan Football Association, forced by smaller Uruguayan clubs against Nacional’s wishes), Flamengo and Fluminense requested the vacancy from the CBD, which, in a meeting, decided to grant it to Fluminense, prompting protests from Flamengo. Thus, in 1953, Vasco da Gama had already won two South American titles and one intercontinental title.

In 1956, the Carioca Championship was held, and the Vasco team was motivated to prevent their rivals, Flamengo, from achieving an unprecedented fourth consecutive title. In the penultimate round, a crucial match against Bangu, which featured Zizinho among its stars. However, the player was sent off for insulting the referee, and Vasco won the match 2–1. In the final round, a draw against Olaria was enough to secure the title.

On June 14, 1957, Vasco da Gama wrote an unforgettable page in its history: the São Januário team once again blazed new trails by defeating Real Madrid 4–3 in the final, lifting the trophy of the inaugural Tournoi de Paris (France), with a performance against Real Madrid that captivated the French public and press. It brought prestige to itself and Brazilian football before the European public. The goals were scored by Válter, Vavá, Livinho, and Sabará. Di Stéfano, Mateos, and Kopa scored for Real.

Real Madrid was considered the best team in the world, having won the two editions of the UEFA Champions League that had taken place (1955/1956 and 1956/1957). If their defense was a fortress, their attack was devastating, led by Frenchman Raymond Kopa, Spaniard Paco Gento, and above all, the Argentine Alfredo Di Stéfano. It was no surprise that Real, a two-time European champion at that point, would continue winning the European Champions Cup consecutively until 1960. In a column in the newspaper L'Équipe, Jacques Ferran wrote about the match:

"And then, suddenly, Real literally disappeared. Was it the pale red shirts or the dull blue shorts that weakened the superb Spanish team? No; it was that, before them, there suddenly appeared on the other side the marvelous bodies, clad in white shirts with a black sash, of eleven football athletes, eleven black devils who took control of the ball and never let it go.

For the next half-hour, the incredible, prodigious impression was that the great Real Madrid, champion of Europe, the untouchable Real, victor of all European constellations, was learning how to play football."

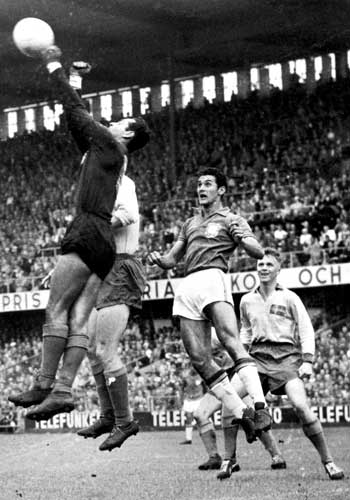
Orlando Peçanha (center), Vasco's defender, playing for the Brazilian national team at the 1958 World Cup.

With the victory over Real Madrid in the 1957 Paris Tournament, Vasco once again demonstrated its pioneering spirit, as it had in 1948 by becoming the first South American champion: in the 1957 Paris Tournament final, Vasco became the first non-European club to defeat a European continental champion (champion of the European Champion Clubs' Cup), and the only non-European club to achieve this feat before the inaugural edition of the Intercontinental Cup (1960), a competition whose creation was announced on October 8, 1958, and which, starting in 1960, would be held as the European-South American intercontinental club title. Furthermore, Vasco's victory in the 1957 Paris Tournament represented the first title for Brazilian football (including clubs and the national team) on European soil. The Paris Tournament was so significant at the time that it was the only intercontinental tournament (with clubs from more than one continent) that Real Madrid agreed to participate in since becoming European champions (June 13, 1956) until the first Intercontinental Cup (July 3, 1960), and Real only did not participate in the 1958 Paris Tournament ( May 21–23, 1958) to prepare for the European Champions Cup final that year, which was five days later (May 28, 1958). During Real Madrid's entire reign as European champions, from June 13, 1956, to 1960, no other non-European team besides Vasco managed to defeat Real Madrid, not even Pelé’s Santos, which was defeated by Real Madrid 5–3 on June 17, 1959.

Some sources claim that Vasco da Gama and Flamengo participated in the 1957 and 1958 Paris Tournaments as representatives of South American football, a fact that, combined with the participation of Real Madrid (1955/1956 European champions when invited to the tournament and who would become two-time champions 1955/56–1956/57 ten days after being invited to the Paris Tournament), would have made the 1957 Paris Tournament the first competition in which clubs acted as representatives of their continents, not their countries, even before the creation of the Intercontinental Cup.

Moreover, the European press noted that Real Madrid's defeat to Vasco elevated the reputation of Brazilian football in Europe, showed that "Real Madrid was not invincible", and that Vasco, "which represented South American football" in that tournament, was proof that the future of football was not Europe but South America. The European press's words about that match between Vasco and Real Madrid were prophetic: eight months later, on February 15, 1958, the Spanish press was already considering the creation of a South American club tournament, similar to the one in Europe, and on October 8, 1958, the creation of the Copa Libertadores and the Intercontinental Cup was announced.

In 1961, the tournament was considered by the French press as an authentic unofficial intercontinental title, in a year when the tournament's final was similar to the one won by Vasco in 1957 (in both cases, 1957 and 1961, the final was between the European champion and the team considered by the French press as the best in South America).

Also in 1957, Vasco would defeat FC Barcelona with a 7–2 thrashing at the old Les Corts stadium. Vasco is the Brazilian club that has faced Barça the most: 11 matches, with three wins, four losses, and four draws. Vasco’s victories over the two great Spanish clubs of the time, Real Madrid and Barcelona, led the Spanish press to question the quality of their own football. The magazine Vida Deportiva, writing about the thrashing of Barcelona, stated that "Vasco won with an ease that calls into question the real value of our football". Meanwhile, the magazine El Once, on its cover, featured an illustration depicting Vasco players, with racial stereotypes, teaching Barcelona players how to play football. Describing Vasco's European tour, the Brazilian newspaper Jornal dos Sports wrote in a headline, "Like a hurricane, Vasco sweeps through world football".

Also in that year, Vasco would win the Chile International Triangular Tournament (Chile), the Lima Tournament (Peru), and the Teresa Herrera Trophy (Spain), all unbeaten.

In 1958, Vasco again won the Carioca Championship, with Flamengo as runner-up, and the Torneio Rio-São Paulo in the final round, with Flamengo again finishing second.

=== The 1960s ===
After the 1958 title, Vasco would have a good campaign again in 1962, in the Carioca Championship won by Botafogo, which would become two-time champions after three decades. Then the Gigante da Colina won the inaugural Taça Guanabara, created that season to designate the representative of the Guanabara State for the Brazilian Championship of the time—the Taça Brasil. The following year, the Almirante won the Torneio Rio-São Paulo of 1966 in football, tied with Botafogo, Santos, and Corinthians. The 1960s marked a profound financial crisis for the club, which culminated in 1969, with the impeachment of its president, Reynaldo Reis.

=== 1970s: Conquest of the first Brazilian Championship ===
In this decade, the idol Roberto Dinamite emerged, and the Argentine goalkeeper Andrada also stood out.

In the 1970s, Vasco began to recover, albeit timidly, winning the state championship of 1970.

The greatest achievement of the era was the Brazilian Championship of 1974, with Roberto Dinamite becoming the top scorer.

They also won the state championship of 1977, in a memorable campaign.

However, they lost the state championship finals in 1978. That year, the famous chant of the Vasco fans emerged: "Vasco is the comeback team, Vasco is the team of love", inspired by a samba from the Beija-Flor samba school. The chant would later be adopted by other fanbases, such as Santos, Palmeiras, and Atlético-MG.

In 1979, the team lost the Brazilian Championship final. Roberto Dinamite was transferred to FC Barcelona at the end of the year.

The club's politics became turbulent. With the natural wear from several years in office and successive losses in championship finals, especially to their rival, president Agathyrno da Silva Gomes was defeated by the slate of Alberto Pires Ribeiro, which included a union of major Vasco figures, in the 1979 elections.

=== 1980s ===
Vasco started poorly, losing the Carioca Championship of 1980 to Fluminense. The most significant event that year, however, was the return of Roberto Dinamite.

Roberto had not adapted to Barcelona, scoring only three goals in eight matches and ending up as a substitute for the Catalan team. Dissatisfied, he planned to return to Brazil.

His return was special. In a Vasco vs. Corinthians match, with Flamengo fans joining Corinthians supporters (since it was a doubleheader at the Maracanã, with Flamengo playing the preliminary match against Bangu), in what was called the Fla-Fiel (in reference to Corinthians’ Gaviões da Fiel fanbase), Roberto scored all five Vasco goals and led the team to a 5–2 victory. All goals were from open play.

Despite Roberto's return, Vasco did not advance to the semi-finals of the tournament, finishing in eighth place in the Brazilian Championship.

In 1981, another loss in the Carioca Championship. It was a controversial defeat due to the events that occurred at the end of the final. According to the regulations, Vasco needed to win three consecutive matches to become champions. They won the first two, but in the last one, when they were losing 2–1, a Flamengo fan entered the field through their locker room and disrupted the game during a moment of Vasco's reaction. The episode became known as the "bricklayer case", as the fan identified himself as such.

In that year's Brazilian Championship, Vasco finished in fifth place. A month later, the team won the Torneio João Havelange, after defeating Flamengo, Democrata (MG), Rio Branco, and Colatina.

In 1982, Vasco would again win the state championship. In this championship, Roberto scored his 500th career goal.

Vasco reached the final three-way playoff of the tournament against America and Flamengo, champions of the second and first rounds, respectively. Vasco reached the final for having the most points in the two rounds. Before the final, coach Antônio Lopes removed five starters from the team.

After a 1–0 victory over America, it was time for the final against their archrivals and the revenge for 1981. In the second half, Pedrinho Gaúcho took a corner kick, and Marquinho lightly touched the ball, scoring the goal that would give Vasco the title. However, the referee considered it an Olympic goal by Pedrinho Gaúcho.

In 1983, the team finished sixth in the Brazilian Championship and seventh in the Carioca Championship. These were the worst positions in Vasco's history up to that point.

In 1984, after a brilliant campaign, they lost the Brazilian Championship title to Fluminense. In the state championship, after winning the Taça Rio (second round of the championship), the team finished in third place.

With the Brazilian Championship runner-up finish, Vasco returned to the Libertadores the following year. However, they were eliminated in the first phase. In the Brazilian Championship, they finished in eleventh place. However, at the end of the year, Romário debuted with the first team, joining Roberto in the attack.

In 1986, Vasco won the Taça Guanabara again, defeating Flamengo 2–0, with two goals from Romário. However, their archrival ended up winning the next round and the championship.

In 1987, the team won the state championship with a brilliant campaign, featuring the top three scorers of the competition (Romário, Roberto Dinamite, and Tita, respectively). The final was against their rival Flamengo, and Vasco won 1–0, with a goal by Tita, a former Flamengo player.

In 1988, Vasco started the Carioca Championship with a 1–0 loss to Flamengo, with a goal by Bebeto, in a match that ended much earlier due to a power outage and the failure of the Maracanã’s floodlights. Later, Flamengo won the Taça Guanabara, and due to their strong performance during the round, it seemed clear that Zico's team would be the Carioca champions.

However, in the second round, Vasco defeated their archrival 1–0, with a goal by Henrique, and from then on began to show they were not just a contender for the title. Later, they defeated Fluminense in the Taça Rio final and won it. Facing Flamengo in the Third Round (a kind of semi-final), they overcame them again, winning 3–1, with goals from Vivinho (1) and the young debutant Sorato (2), with Andrade scoring for Flamengo. In the championship final, Vasco left no doubt about their superiority. In the first match, they won 2–1 in a comeback (Bismarck and Romário, with Bebeto scoring for Flamengo). On the day of the grand final, Vasco's defender Fernando stated beforehand that Flamengo's goal from the previous match would not happen again, and it was fulfilled: after almost the entire regular time without goals, Cocada entered in the 41st minute and scored the decisive victory goal in the 44th minute, with Vasco only needing a draw. After the goal, Cocada was sent off with a red card for celebrating by removing his shirt, and Romário and Renato Gaúcho were also sent off. Vasco celebrated winning the Carioca title, totaling four victories over Flamengo. The team's standout was midfielder Geovani, the Little Vasco Prince (athlete of the year by Placar magazine).

In the same year, they had an excellent campaign in the Brazilian Championship, amassing a total of points well above the champion club, Bahia. Additionally, they achieved a series of five consecutive victories over their rival Flamengo (1–0, 3–1, 2–1, 1–0, 1–0). Notable victories in this competition included thrashings of 4–2 against Portuguesa (where Vivinho scored a remarkable goal, dribbling past Portuguesa's player Capitão three times in a row), 4–0 against Santos, and 3–0 against Botafogo.

In 1989, continuing the 1988 Brazilian Championship, Vasco's good phase ended with their elimination by Fluminense in the early second phase. After a complicated state championship (though greatly helping Botafogo by preventing Flamengo from winning the Taça Rio by defeating them), Vasco rebuilt the squad, signing nationally prominent players, earning the nickname SeleVasco, as the team was considered a true national team. The biggest highlight was the signing of Bebeto, acquired precisely from rivals Flamengo. Vasco became champions, defeating São Paulo in the final at Morumbi, 1–0, with a goal by Sorato. In that match, about 25,000 Vasco fans were present at Morumbi.

At the club, amateur sports were relegated to a secondary role, and many athletes ended up transferring to other clubs in search of better conditions. The club did not seek to retain them. The rowing team only won the state championship in 1982 and the Troféu Brasil in 1987. The basketball team maintained some prominence at the state level, winning the state championships in 1981, 1983, 1987, and 1989, as well as the Brazilian Championship in 1981. Another sport that developed during this period was athletics.

=== 1990s ===
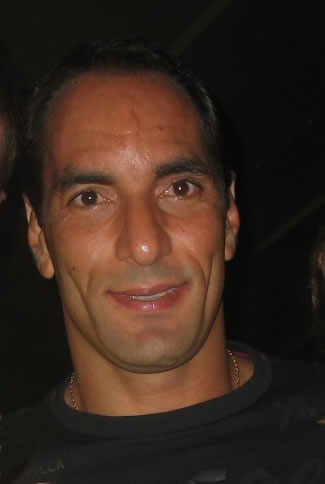
Edmundo, nicknamed by Vasco fans as the "Animal". The striker is one of the greatest idols in the club's history.

The 1990s at Vasco were marked by the farewell from the fields of idol Roberto Dinamite in 1993, and the rise of new idols such as Edmundo (the Animal), Felipe, Pedrinho, Carlos Germano, Pimentel, Valdir Bigode, and Juninho Pernambucano. In 1992, the club won its first title that would mark the beginning of the conquest of the Carioca Championships of 1992, 1993, and 1994, winning its first three consecutive state championships, followed by the 1998 State Championship. Also in 1997, which was a brilliant year for Edmundo, Vasco won the Brazilian championship for the third time.

On August 18, 1997, the club was made an Honorary Member of the Order of Merit of Portugal. The club celebrated its centenary in 1998. The club's centenary was the theme of the Rio Carnival by the Unidos da Tijuca samba school, which composed a samba-enredo, immortalized by Vasco fans even before that year's parade and which, to this day, is sung by Vasco supporters. However, this was just the first of many celebrations that would come that year. The club would also become champions of the Carioca Championship and the Copa Libertadores, the latter won on August 26, just five days after the club's anniversary.

However, the celebration was tempered by setbacks, including losses in the Intercontinental Cup to Real Madrid and the Copa Interamericana to DC United.

The year after the centenary, Vasco won the Rio-São Paulo Tournament for the third time. Qualified by the consecutive conquests in 1997, 1998, and 1999, Vasco was the favorite for the 1999 Campeonato Carioca. However, they lost the finals to their archrival Flamengo, in an occasion where referee Léo Feldman validated an illegal goal by Flamengo's Fábio Baiano, who fouled Felipe (pulling his shirt) before scoring.

In the decade, Vasco had great stars. In addition to idols Carlos Germano, Mauro Galvão, Juninho Pernambucano, Felipe, Pedrinho, Edmundo, and Romário, other major signings were made, such as full-back Jorginho, defender Júnior Baiano, midfielders Ramon Menezes, Vágner, and Juninho Paulista, and strikers Evair, Donizete, Luizão, Euller, Viola, and Guilherme.

=== 2000s: More major titles and the start of a severe crisis ===
In 2000, Vasco won the Copa Mercosur in a historic final against Palmeiras, turning around a 3–0 deficit from the first half to a 4–3 victory, in what became known as "the comeback of the century"; and lifted the Brazilian Championship of 2000, in a tumultuous final against São Caetano. During the second leg at São Januário, part of the fence collapsed in the middle of the first half—with the score at 0–0—after a disturbance in the overcrowded stands. However, after a decision by the STJD to hold a new match at the Maracanã, the Gigante da Colina, which had drawn 1–1 in the first leg, won 3–1 against the São Paulo team and lifted their fourth trophy in the country's biggest national competition.

In basketball, the team won the South American League in 2000 and the National Championship in 2000 and 2001.

The following years were marked by a notable absence of significant achievements for Vasco fans, with the exception of 2003, when the team won their 22nd state title by defeating Fluminense in the final. Gradually, the club entered a financial and internal political crisis, resulting in less competitive teams. In the Brazilian Championship, the team struggled to perform well, even facing relegation threats in 2004 and 2005. The exception was 2006, when the team finished in sixth place, two points shy of qualifying for the following year's Libertadores.

In the Copa do Brasil, Vasco's participation was marked by losses to less prominent teams, such as XV de Novembro from Campo Bom and Baraúnas, until 2006, when they reached their first final in the competition's history—although they had reached the semi-finals five times (most recently in 2006, against Fluminense). They earned a spot in the 2006 final by defeating Fluminense 1–0 in the first leg and drawing 1–1 in the second. In the final, after a long break due to the World Cup, the team lost focus and the title to Flamengo, losing both matches (0–2 and 0–1).

In the 2007 Brazilian Championship, Romário scored his 1,000th career goal from a penalty in a match against Sport Recife.

==== Relegation in 2008 ====
The year 2008 began tumultuously for Vasco, with the team facing a severe financial crisis and internal problems. As the months passed, the issues only grew, reflecting on the field with successive coach changes and a constant flow of players throughout the competitions.

On July 1, 2008, in a tumultuous election, the club elected former player Roberto Dinamite as president, winning the 2008 elections. Eurico Miranda, a director who had been with the club since the 1980s, stepped down. He was notable for the controversy surrounding the 1987 Brazilian Championship title between Flamengo and Sport and for Vasco's victorious phase, but nothing could erase the crisis of his final years in charge.

With a poor campaign in the 2008 Brazilian Championship, Vasco was at the bottom of the table, suffered thrashings, and had the worst campaign in its history. In the final rounds, they bet on coach Renato Gaúcho, and the fans filled São Januário to support the team, but nothing worked. The team ended up losing at home, with fans and players in tears over the relegation, finishing in 18th place, the first time in their history, after a 2–0 defeat to Esporte Clube Vitória. A scene that stood out was a fan attempting to jump from the stadium's marquee, but he was restrained by firefighters.

==== Return to the elite in 2009 ====
The year 2009 began with difficulties, as Vasco was one of the most indebted clubs in the country and struggled to build a new team. For the team's leadership, Dorival Júnior was the bet as the new coach.

In the Copa do Brasil, the team surprised and reached the semi-finals, only stopped by Corinthians due to a 1–1 draw at the Maracanã with over 60,000 fans and a 0–0 draw at the Pacaembu.

After a 2–1 victory over Juventude in front of 81,904 people at the Maracanã, the club's promotion to the elite was secured with four rounds to spare. The club also won the title on November 13, with three rounds to spare, after a 2–1 comeback victory over América at the Maracanã.

=== 2010s: From Vasco's redemption to the worsening crisis ===
==== 2011: Copa do Brasil champion ====
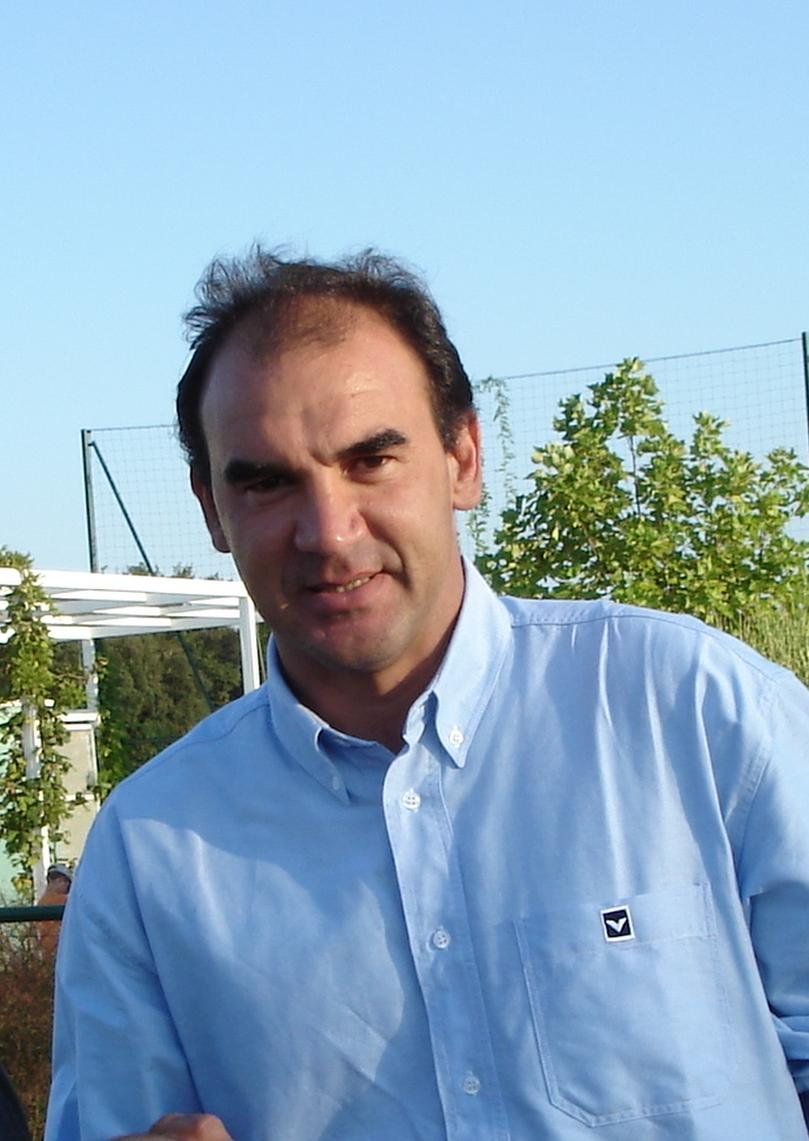
Ricardo Gomes, the coach who led Vasco to win the unprecedented Copa do Brasil in 2011.

Upon returning to the elite, 2010 began as an uncertainty for Vasco. The team had a reasonable state championship, with coaches sacked due to a worrying start in the Brazilian Championship until the arrival of Paulo César Gusmão, who improved the team's performance, finishing in the middle of the 2010 Brasileirão table.

In 2011, after a turbulent start in the state championship, Ricardo Gomes, hired to replace PC Gusmão, organized the team, along with the arrivals of Diego Souza, Alecsandro, Bernardo, and the return of Elton; the team began playing good football again. The Bullet Train of the Hill emerged. The team reached the final of the second round of the Carioca Championship against Flamengo. After a 0–0 draw in regular time, the team lost on penalties, and the title went to their rival. After that, the team focused on the Copa do Brasil. Playing well, they reached the final against Coritiba. In the first leg at São Januário, they won 1–0, with a goal by Alecsandro. On June 8, 2011, despite losing 3–2, with goals from Alecsandro and Éder Luís in their favor, Vasco became Copa do Brasil champions by the away goals rule, securing a spot in the 2012 Copa Libertadores. During the Brasileirão, Ricardo Gomes suffered a stroke and had to step away indefinitely. Assistant Cristóvão Borges took over and continued the good work for the rest of the season. Even after securing a spot in the top continental competition, the team fought until the final round for the 2011 Brazilian Championship title, finishing in second place, and reaching the semi-finals of the 2011 Copa Sudamericana that same year.

The year 2012 was anticipated as the year of restoring their respect, with expectations of victories. Vasco reached the finals in both rounds of the Carioca Championship, after defeating Flamengo in both semi-finals. The main competition for Vasco that year was the Copa Libertadores. After a strong campaign, the team was eliminated in the quarterfinals by Corinthians, with a goal in the 43rd minute of the second half. The match is still remembered for the goal missed by Diego Souza face-to-face with goalkeeper Cássio. In the Brazilian Championship, the team set a record of 54 consecutive rounds in the top four (counting the 2011 and 2012 Brasileirão), although they did not secure a spot for the 2013 Libertadores. With no conquests, no financial return came to the club, which still had one of the largest debts in Brazilian football. As a result, many players began to be released or forced their departure due to unpaid wages, and what could have been the decade of Vasco's redemption began to turn into a new nightmare for the coming years.

==== 2013: Second relegation to Série B ====
The Vasco team was relegated to Série B of the 2013 Brazilian Championship after a 5–1 defeat to Atlético Paranaense. The Gigante da Colina needed a victory or a loss by Coritiba (a draw would also suffice for Coritiba) or Criciúma to avoid relegation. Coritiba won, but Criciúma lost 3–0 to Botafogo. In both 2008 and 2013, Vasco finished their participation in 18th place.

This match was held at Arena Joinville, not in Paraná (Atlético-PR's home). There was also a tragic clash between fanbases due to insufficient policing, leading to a violent brawl in the stands. (Both Atlético-PR and Vasco da Gama had previously been punished with the loss of home-field advantage due to earlier fan clashes.) With the widespread disturbance in the stands and a pitch invasion, the referee halted the match due to safety concerns. After a one hour and twelve minute stoppage and several interventions by players from both clubs to calm the agitated fans, the match resumed with reinforced policing in the stands and on the field.

==== 2014: Return to Série A ====
Vasco was runner-up in the Carioca Championship again after losing to their archrival Flamengo. Vasco had a below-average campaign in Série B, securing promotion with one round to spare after a 1–1 draw against Icasa, at the Maracanã Stadium, in front of over 50,000 fans. Vasco finished in third place after losing 1–0 to Avaí, with a goal conceded after a penalty committed by Diego Renan.

==== 2015: End of the state championship drought and third relegation ====
In 2015, the Gigante da Colina added another trophy to its collection. Vasco broke a 12-year drought without a state title. With a 1–0 victory in the first leg, with a goal by Rafael Silva, the hero of the match, and a 2–1 victory in the second leg, with the decisive title goal scored by Gilberto, Vasco became the 2015 Carioca champions, in a match with over 70,000 fans present, the attendance record for that year at the time.

In the 2015 Brazilian Championship, Vasco was relegated for the third time in its history on December 6, 2015, after a goalless draw against Coritiba.

==== 2016: Historic unbeaten streak and return to Série A ====
In the 2016 Carioca Championship, Vasco won the Taça Guanabara against Fluminense. With the best campaign in the championship, Vasco faced Flamengo in the semi-final and won 2–0, qualifying for the Carioca final. In the first leg of the final, as the away team, Vasco defeated Botafogo 1–0, with a goal by Jorge Henrique, gaining the advantage of playing for a draw to become champions. In the second leg, Vasco maintained the advantage, drawing the match with a goal by Rafael Vaz and won the state championship for the second consecutive time without losing a single game, their sixth unbeaten title in history.

In the second phase of the 2016 Copa do Brasil, Vasco qualified after a 1–1 draw in the return leg against CRB from Alagoas at São Januário; the qualifying goal was scored by Rafael Vaz in stoppage time of the second half. In this match, the club achieved the longest unbeaten streak in official matches in its history, with 28 games.

In the Série B, Vasco debuted strongly, thrashing Sampaio Corrêa 4–0 away, with three goals by Nenê and one by Riascos. In the eighth round, on June 11 in Cariacica, Espírito Santo, against the second-placed Atlético-GO, Vasco's historic unbeaten streak in official matches ended after 34 games and over seven months. Vasco secured promotion to the First Division after a 2–1 comeback victory over Ceará with goals by Thalles at the Maracanã in the final round of Série B, finishing the competition in third place.

=== 2020s: Present day ===
==== 2020: Fourth relegation ====
In 2020, Vasco da Gama briefly led the 2020 Brazilian Championship in the 4th round, but due to a series of poor results, the club was relegated for the fourth time in its history. In 2021, Vasco failed to secure promotion to the Brazilian top tier, finishing the championship in tenth place.

==== 2022: Acquisition by 777 Partners and return to Série A ====
On February 22, 2022, it was announced that 777 Partners, a private investment firm based in Miami founded by Steven W. Pasko and Josh Wander, acquired a controlling stake in Vasco da Gama. According to the terms of the agreement, 777 Partners purchased a 70% stake in the club, valued at approximately US$330 million. On November 6, 2022, Vasco secured their return to Série A after a two-year absence by defeating Ituano in a match that became known as the Battle of Itu.

==== 2023: The closure of São Januário Stadium ====
In 2023, Vasco's stadium was closed due to widespread disturbances following a defeat against Goiás. São Januário became a battleground (poor results in previous matches under coach Mauricio Barbieri, combined with the outcome of this game and the inaction of the board in dismissing Barbieri, triggered fan outrage), and since then, the Rio de Janeiro judiciary has kept the stadium closed. Vasco was punished by the STJD with four matches without spectators, and São Januário was closed on June 23 at the request of the Consumer Protection Agency. Vasco was temporarily penalized, for 30 days until the trial, to play with closed gates, and the stadium was closed. Coach Mauricio Barbieri was sacked on the same day as the ban. On July 15, Vasco finalized the hiring of Barbieri's replacement, Argentine coach Ramón Diaz.

Vasco appealed, and through an injunction, on September 8, the stadium was reopened by the Rio de Janeiro judiciary, but for matches without spectators.

The prolonged ban was considered an elitist act, as the stadium is surrounded by the Barreira do Vasco community, which has an active local commerce (increasing residents' income) on match days.

On August 30, the 2nd Chamber of Private Law of the Rio de Janeiro Court of Justice (TJ-RJ) upheld the ban by a 2–1 vote.

A federal congressman launched the hashtag #LiberaSãoJanuário on social media to protest the ban.

Vasco approached the Public Prosecutor's Office with a proposal for a Consent decree. On September 13, the decree was signed, and the stadium was finally reopened after 82 days.

The first match after the reopening was against Coritiba on September 21, with a 5–1 victory for Vasco. There was a grand celebration by the Cruzmaltino fans due to the return of matches to the stadium.

Throughout the season, the club fought against relegation, which many in the press considered inevitable, but recovered and managed to stay in the top tier in the final round. The stadium was crucial for the club to remain in the elite of the Brazilian Championship, thanks to the unwavering support of the fans.

== Timeline ==
Timeline of Club de Regatas Vasco da Gama
August 21, 1898 – Founding of the Club de Regatas Vasco da Gama.; November 26, 1915 – Establishment of the football division of Club de Regatas Vasco da Gama.; 1916 – 6th place in the State Série C; 1917 – 4th place in the State Série B; 1918 – 3rd place in the State Série B; Champion of the Dr. Mário Newton Trophy: 1919 – 5th place in the State Série B; __________________________________________________: 1920 – 4th place in the State Série B; Carioca Champion of Second Teams in Série B: 1921 – 3rd place in the State Série B; 1922 – Champion of the State Série B; Carioca Champion of Third Teams Carioca Champion of Second Teams in Série B Carioca Champion of Third Teams Série B: 1923 – Champion of the State Championship (1st title); April 7, 1924 – Publication of the Historic Response.; 1924 – Champion of the State Championship (2nd title); Carioca Champion of Second Teams Permanent possession of the Constantino Trophy: 1925 – 3rd place in the State Championship; x Champion of the Barão de Coubertin Trophy: 1926 – Runner-up in the State Championship; Champion of the Torneio Início Carioca Carioca Champion of Third Teams Champion of the Francisco Marques da Silva Trophy: 1927 – 4th place in the State Championship; Champion of the Pregão da Victoria Trophy Champion of the Sarmento de Beires Trophy: 1928 – Runner-up in the State Championship; Carioca Champion of Second Teams x Champion of the Alberto Baccarat Trophy: 1929 – Champion of the State Championship (3rd title); Champion of the Torneio Início Carioca Runner-up in the RJ-SP Champions Trophy __________________________________________________: 1930 – Runner-up in the State Championship; Champion of the Torneio Início Carioca Carioca Champion of Third Teams Champion of the Moacyr Queirós Trophy Champion of the Monroe Trophy: 1931 – Runner-up in the State Championship; Champion of the Myrurgia Cup Champion of the Torneio Início Carioca Champion of the Monroe Trophy: 1932 – 6th place in the State Championship; Champion of the Torneio Início Carioca: 1933 – 3rd place in the State Championship; 1934 – Champion of the State Championship (4th title); x Champion of the RJ-SP Champions Trophy (1st title) Carioca Champion of Second Teams: 1935 – Runner-up in the State Championship; 1936 – Champion of the State Championship (5th title); x Champion of the RJ-SP Champions Trophy (2nd title) Carioca Amateur Champion: 1937 – 3rd place in the State Championship; Carioca Amateur Champion Champion of the Pinto Bastos Trophy Champion of the Bronze da Vitória Trophy: 1938 – 3rd place in the State Championship; 1939 – 6th place in the State Championship; __________________________________________________: 1940 – 3rd place in the State Championship; Champion of the Luís Aranha Tournament: 1941 – 4th place in the State Championship; Carioca Amateur Champion: 1942 – 7th place in the State Championship; Champion of the Torneio Início Carioca Carioca Champion of Second Teams Champion of the Peace Trophy "O Camiseiro”: 1943 – 3rd place in the State Championship; Carioca Champion of Second Teams: 1944 – Runner-up in the State Championship; Champion of the Torneio Início Carioca Champion of the Municipal Tournament Champion of the Relâmpago Tournament: 1945 – Champion of the State Championship (6th title); Champion of the Torneio Início Carioca Champion of the Municipal Tournament Runner-up in the RJ-SP Champions Trophy: 1946 – 5th place in the State Championship; Carioca Champion of Second Teams Champion of the Municipal Tournament Champion of the Relâmpago Tournament: 1947 – Champion of the State Championship (7th title); Champion of the Centenários Trophy Carioca Champion of Second Teams Champion of the Municipal Tournament Runner-up in the Teresa Herrera Trophy Runner-up in the RJ-SP Champions Trophy 4th place in the Atlantic Cup: August 21, 1948 – 50th anniversary of the founding of the Club de Regatas Vasco da Gama.; 1948 – Runner-up in the State Championship; Champion of the South American Championship of Champions (1st Continental Title) Champion of the Torneio Início Carioca Carioca Champion of Second Teams Champion of the Gérson dos Santos Coelho Tournament: 1949 – Champion of the State Championship (8th title); Carioca Champion of Second Teams __________________________________________________: 1950 – Champion of the State Championship (9th title); Runner-up in the Rio-São Paulo Tournament: 1951 – 5th place in the State Championship; 3rd place in the Copa Rio Intercontinental 4th place in the Rio-São Paulo Tournament: 1952 – Champion of the State Championship (10th title); Runner-up in the Rio-São Paulo Tournament: 1953 – 4th place in the State Championship; Champion of the Torneio Octogonal Rivadavia Correa Meyer (1st Intercontinental Title) Champion of the Rio International Quadrangular Tournament Champion of the Santiago International Tournament Champion of the Racing Club 50th Anniversary Trophy Runner-up in the Rio-São Paulo Tournament: 1954 – 4th place in the State Championship; 1955 – 3rd place in the State Championship; 3rd place in the Gilberto Cardoso International Tournament: 1956 – Champion of the State Championship (11th title); Runner-up in the Small World Cup Runner-up in the RJ-SP Champions Trophy: 1957 – 4th place in the State Championship; Champion of the Paris International Tournament (2nd Intercontinental Title) Champion of the Chile International Tournament Champion of the Lima Quadrangular Tournament Champion of the Teresa Herrera Trophy Runner-up in the Rio-São Paulo Tournament: 1958 – Champion of the State Championship (12th title); x Champion of the Rio-São Paulo Tournament (1st title) Champion of the Torneio Início Carioca: 1959 – 4th place in the State Championship; 3rd place in the Tournoi de Paris 3rd place in the Taça Brasil Runner-up in the Rio-São Paulo Tournament __________________________________________________: 1960 – 5th place in the State Championship; Carioca Champion of Second Teams 3rd place in the Rio-São Paulo Tournament: 1961 – Runner-up in the State Championship; Carioca Champion of Second Teams 3rd place in the Rio-São Paulo Tournament: 1962 – 4th place in the State Championship; x Champion of the Mãe Pátria Trophy: 1963 – 6th place in the State Championship; Champion of the Santiago International Tournament Champion of the Mexico Pentagonal Tournament Runner-up in the Teresa Herrera Trophy: 1964 – 6th place in the State Championship; Champion of the Belém Quadrangular (Francisco Vasques) Carioca Champion of Second Teams 4th place in the Asunción Quadrangular: 1965 – 5th place in the State Championship; Champion of the Rio 400th Anniversary Trophy Champion of the FPF 50th Anniversary Tournament Champion of the Taça Guanabara (separate edition) Runner-up in the Taça Brasil Runner-up in the Rio-São Paulo Tournament: 1966 – 5th place in the State Championship; x Champion of the Rio-São Paulo Tournament (2nd title) Champion of the Raul Guimarães Trophy for Second Teams 3rd place in the Ais El Kebir Tournament 4th place in the Tournoi de Paris 4th place in the Capitalino International Hexagonal: 1967 – 6th place in the State Championship; Carioca Champion of Second Teams Runner-up in the Governor Negrão de Lima Tournament 4th place in the Ramón de Carranza Trophy 11th place in the Torneio Roberto Gomes Pedrosa: 1968 – Runner-up in the State Championship; 3rd place in the Torneio Roberto Gomes Pedrosa: 1969 – 4th place in the State Championship; 17th place in the Torneio Roberto Gomes Pedrosa 3rd place in the Caracas Carnival Cup __________________________________________________: 1970 – Champion of the State Championship (13th title); 17th place in the Torneio Roberto Gomes Pedrosa 3rd place in the Rio de Janeiro International Tournament: 1971 – 6th place in the State Championship; 12th place in the Brazilian Championship: 1972 – 3rd place in the State Championship; Champion of the José de Albuquerque Trophy 7th place in the Brazilian Championship 3rd place in the Rio de Janeiro International Tournament 4th place in the Joan Gamper Trophy: 1973 – 3rd place in the State Championship; Champion of the Pedro Novaes Trophy Champion of the Extra Tournament 14th place in the Brazilian Championship Runner-up in the Summer International Tournament: 1974 – Runner-up in the State Championship; Champion of the Brazilian Championship (1st title) Champion of the Salva de Prata Trophy Champion of the Oscar Wright da Silva Trophy: 1975 – 3rd place in the State Championship; Champion of the Danilo Leal Carneiro Trophy Champion of the Cabo Frio City Trophy 16th place in the Copa Libertadores 20th place in the Brazilian Championship: 1976 – Runner-up in the State Championship; Champion of the Governor Heleno Nunes Tournament Champion of the Taça Guanabara (2nd title) 12th place in the Brazilian Championship: 1977 – Champion of the State Championship (14th title); Champion of the Santa Catarina Press Tournament Champion of the Taça Guanabara (3rd title) Champion of the Manoel do Nascimento Vargas Netto Trophy 3rd place in the Ramón de Carranza Trophy 4th place in the Tournoi de Paris 12th place in the Brazilian Championship: 1978 – Runner-up in the State Championship; 4th place in the Brazilian Championship 3rd place in the Brazilian Champions Cup: 1979 – Runner-up in the State Championship; Champion of the Seville City Tournament Champion of the Festa d'Elx Trophy Runner-up in the Brazilian Championship Runner-up in the Palma de Mallorca City Trophy __________________________________________________: 1980 – Runner-up in the State Championship; Champion of the Huelva Colombino Trophy Champion of the José Fernandes Tournament Champion of the Gustavo de Carvalho Trophy 8th place in the Copa Libertadores 8th place in the Brazilian Championship Runner-up in the Joan Gamper Trophy Runner-up in the Belgrade Tournament 3rd place in the Naranja Trophy: 1981 – Runner-up in the State Championship; Champion of the Funchal Island Tournament Champion of the Portugal Week Trophy Champion of the João Havelange Tournament Champion of the Ney Cidade Palmeiro Trophy Runner-up in the Split International Tournament 3rd place in the Joan Gamper Trophy 3rd place in the Tournoi de Paris 4th place in the Villa de Madrid Trophy 5th place in the Brazilian Championship: 1982 – Champion of the State Championship (15th title); Champion of the Summer Tournament Champion of the João Castelo Tournament 9th place in the Brazilian Championship: 1983 – 7th place in the State Championship; Runner-up in the Fería del Sol Trophy Runner-up in the Zanussi International Tournament 6th place in the Brazilian Championship: 1984 – 3rd place in the State Championship; Champion of the Taça Rio (1st title) Runner-up in the Teresa Herrera Trophy Runner-up in the Brazilian Championship: 1985 – 4th place in the State Championship; 18th place in the Copa Libertadores 11th place in the Brazilian Championship Runner-up in the Australia International Tournament: 1986 – Runner-up in the State Championship; Champion of the Juiz de Fora City Tournament Champion of the Taça Guanabara (4th title) 13th place in the Brazilian Championship: 1987 – Champion of the State Championship (16th title); Champion of the Los Angeles Gold Cup Champion of the TAP Cup Champion of the Ramón de Carranza Trophy Champion of the Juiz de Fora City Tournament Champion of the Taça Guanabara (5th title) 10th place in the Brazilian Championship 3rd place in the Luanda City Tournament Runner-up in the RJ-SP Champions Trophy: 1988 – Champion of the State Championship (17th title); Champion of the Ramón de Carranza Trophy Champion of the Taça Rio (2nd title) Champion of the Brigadeiro Jerônimo Bastos Trophy Runner-up in the Naranja Trophy Runner-up in the Euro-Luzitânia Tournament 4th place in the Luanda City Tournament 5th place in the Brazilian Championship: 1989 – 3rd place in the State Championship; Champion of the Brazilian Championship (2nd title) Champion of the Ramón de Carranza Trophy Champion of the Metz City Tournament Champion of the Governor Henrique Santillo Trophy 3rd place in the Tournoi de Paris 3rd place in the Loulé International Tournament 12th place in the Copa do Brasil __________________________________________________: 1990 – Runner-up in the State Championship; Champion of the Taça Guanabara (6th title) Champion of the Extra Tournament 6th place in the Copa Libertadores 12th place in the Brazilian Championship Runner-up in the Supercopa do Brasil 3rd place in the San Jose Cup: 1991 – 4th place in the State Championship; Champion of the Friendship Tournament 10th place in the Copa do Brasil 11th place in the Brazilian Championship Runner-up in the Kirin Cup 3rd place in the Camel Cup: 1992 – Champion of the State Championship (18th title); Champion of the Taça Guanabara (7th title) Champion of the Taça Rio (3rd title) Champion of the Copa Rio Champion of the Capital Championship 4th place in the Brazilian Championship 12th place in the Copa do Brasil Runner-up in the Porto City Tournament Runner-up in the La Coruña City Trophy 3rd place in the Seville City Tournament: 1993 – Champion of the State Championship (19th title); x Champion of the João Havelange Tournament Champion of the Taça Rio (4th title) Champion of the Copa Rio Champion of the Trofeo Ciudad de Zaragoza Champion of the Ciutat de Barcelona Trophy 9th place in the Copa Conmebol 3rd place in the Copa do Brasil 20th place in the Brazilian Championship Runner-up in the Villa de Madrid Trophy Runner-up in the Vigo City Trophy: 1994 – Champion of the State Championship (20th title); Champion of the Taça Guanabara (8th title) 3rd place in the Copa do Brasil 12th place in the Brazilian Championship: 1995 – 4th place in the State Championship; Champion of the Palma de Mallorca City Trophy 4th place in the Copa do Brasil 20th place in the Brazilian Championship 3rd place in the Vladikavkaz President Cup: 1996 – Runner-up in the State Championship; 3rd place in the Copa Conmebol 16th place in the Copa do Brasil 18th place in the Brazilian Championship: 1997 – Runner-up in the State Championship; Champion of the Brazilian Championship (3rd title) Champion of the Trofeo Bortolotti Champion of the 3rd Round of the Campeonato Carioca 6th place in the Supercopa Libertadores 14th place in the Copa do Brasil 4th place in the Teresa Herrera Trophy: August 21, 1998 – Centenary of the founding of the Club de Regatas Vasco da Gama.; 1998 – Champion of the State Championship (21st title); Champion of the Copa Libertadores (2nd Continental Title) Champion of the Taça Guanabara (9th title) Champion of the Taça Rio (5th title) 4th place in the Copa do Brasil 11th place in the Copa Mercosur 10th place in the Brazilian Championship Runner-up in the Copa Interamericana Runner-up in the Intercontinental Cup: 1999 – Runner-up in the State Championship; x Champion of the Rio-São Paulo Tournament (3rd title) Champion of the Taça Rio (6th title) 16th place in the Copa Libertadores 10th place in the Copa do Brasil 12th place in the Copa Mercosur 7th place in the Brazilian Championship Runner-up in the Málaga Trophy 7th place in the Ramón de Carranza Trophy __________________________________________________: 2000 – Runner-up in the State Championship; Champion of the Copa Mercosur Champion of the Brazilian Championship (4th title) Champion of the Taça Guanabara (10th title) Runner-up in the FIFA Club World Cup Runner-up in the Rio-São Paulo Tournament 13th place in the Copa do Brasil: 2001 – Runner-up in the State Championship; Champion of the Taça Rio (7th title) 6th place in the Copa Libertadores 13th place in the Copa Mercosur 11th place in the Brazilian Championship: 2002 – 5th place in the State Championship; 8th place in the Copa do Brasil 15th place in the Brazilian Championship: 2003 – Champion of the State Championship (22nd title); Champion of the Taça Guanabara (11th title) Champion of the Taça Rio (8th title) 8th place in the Copa do Brasil 25th place in the Copa Sudamericana 17th place in the Brazilian Championship: 2004 – Runner-up in the State Championship; Champion of the Taça Rio (9th title) 19th place in the Copa do Brasil 16th place in the Brazilian Championship: 2005 – 5th place in the State Championship; 10th place in the Copa do Brasil 12th place in the Brazilian Championship: 2006 – 9th place in the State Championship; Runner-up in the Copa do Brasil 32nd place in the Copa Sudamericana 6th place in the Brazilian Championship: 2007 – 4th place in the State Championship; 17th place in the Copa do Brasil 6th place in the Copa Sudamericana 10th place in the Brazilian Championship: 2008 – 4th place in the State Championship; 3rd place in the Copa do Brasil 21st place in the Copa Sudamericana Runner-up in the Dubai Football Challenge 18th place in the Brazilian Championship: 2009 – 3rd place in the State Championship; 4th place in the Copa do Brasil Champion of the Brazilian Série B __________________________________________________: 2010 – 4th place in the State Championship; Champion of the Copa da Hora 6th place in the Copa do Brasil 10th place in the Brazilian Championship: 2011 – 6th place in the State Championship; Champion of the Copa do Brasil (1st title) 3rd place in the Copa Sudamericana Runner-up in the Brazilian Championship: 2012 – 4th place in the State Championship; 8th place in the Copa Libertadores 5th place in the Brazilian Championship: 2013 – 4th place in the State Championship; 5th place in the Copa do Brasil 18th place in the Brazilian Championship: 2014 – Runner-up in the State Championship; 11th place in the Copa do Brasil 3rd place in the Brazilian Série B: 2015 – Champion of the State Championship (23rd title); 6th place in the Copa do Brasil 18th place in the Brazilian Championship: 2016 – Champion of the State Championship (24th title); Champion of the Taça Guanabara (12th title) 12th place in the Copa do Brasil 3rd place in the Brazilian Série B: 2017 – 3rd place in the State Championship; Champion of the Taça Rio (10th title) 3rd place in the Florida Cup 23rd place in the Copa do Brasil 7th place in the Brazilian Championship: 2018 – Runner-up in the State Championship; 14th place in the Copa do Brasil 19th place in the Copa Libertadores 28th place in the Copa Sudamericana 16th place in the Brazilian Championship Runner-up in the BTV Cup: 2019 – Runner-up in the State Championship; Champion of the Taça Guanabara (13th title) 17th place in the Copa do Brasil 12th place in the Brazilian Championship __________________________________________________: 2020 – 7th place in the State Championship; 21st place in the Copa do Brasil 10th place in the Copa Sudamericana 17th place in the Brazilian Championship: 2021 – 5th place in the State Championship; Champion of the Taça Rio (11th title) 14th place in the Copa do Brasil 10th place in the Brazilian Série B: 2022 – 3rd place in the State Championship; 39th place in the Copa do Brasil 4th place in the Brazilian Série B: 2023 – 3rd place in the State Championship; 33rd place in the Copa do Brasil 15th place in the Brazilian Championship

== Bibliography ==
- Filho, Mario (2003). O negro no futebol brasileiro [The Black in Brazilian Football] (4th ed.). Rio de Janeiro: Mauad.
- Santos, João Manuel Casquinha Malaia (2013). Revolução Vascaína: a profissionalização do futebol e a inserção sócio-econômica de negros e portugueses na cidade do Rio de Janeiro (1915–1934) [Vasco Revolution: The Professionalization of Football and the Socio-Economic Integration of Blacks and Portuguese in the City of Rio de Janeiro (1915–1934)] (doctorate thesis). Universidade de São Paulo (USP).
