= Fernando Giudicelli =

Brazilian footballer (1906–1968)

Personal information
- Full name: Fernando Rubens Pasi Giudicelli
- Date of birth: 1 March 1906
- Place of birth: Rio de Janeiro, Brazil
- Date of death: 28 December 1968 (aged 62)
- Place of death: Rio de Janeiro, Brazil
- Position: Midfielder

Senior career*
Years	Team	Apps	(Gls)
1924–1927	America-RJ	?	(?)
1927–1931	Fluminense	90	(?)
1931–1933	Torino	40	(1)
1933	YF Zürich	?	(?)
1934	America-RJ	?	(?)
1934–1935	Bordeaux	?	(?)
1935	Sporting	1	(0)
1935	Real Madrid	1	(0)
1936–1937	Antibes	29	(8)

International career
1930	Brazil	3	(0)
- * Club domestic league appearances and goals

Fernando Rubens Pasi Giudicelli – esp. in Brazil often just Fernando – (1 March 1906 in Rio de Janeiro – 28 December 1968 in Rio de Janeiro) was a Brazilian football player. He participated in the World Cup of 1930 and played for clubs in Brazil, Italy, Switzerland, France, Portugal and Spain. He also acted as player agent and instigated a number of moves of players from South America to Europe. He was known for the mariners' cap that he wore when playing.

== Career ==
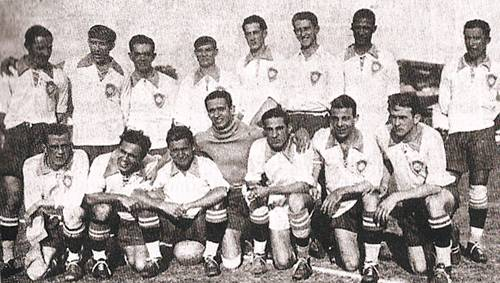
World Cup 1930: Back: Brilhante, Fernando Giudicelli, Hermógenes, Nilo, Carvalho Leite, Itália, Fausto dos Santos, Santana; front: Teóphilo, Benevenuto, Benedito, Velloso, Doca, Russinho, Preguinho.

Guidicelli was born in Rio de Janeiro. A technically gifted central midfield-player of Italian ancestry, he reportedly commenced his career about 1924 with America FC in the north of Rio de Janeiro, then one of the top clubs of Carioca football. In July 1927 he moved south and joined Fluminense FC, for which he played 90 times until June 1931.

At the World Cup 1930 in Uruguay he debuted with the Brazil national football team in the match lost 1–2 against Yugoslavia. He also played in the second match in which Brazil defeated Bolivia 4–0. His third and last match in the national side took place in August of the same year, when Brazil defeated Yugoslavia in Rio 4–1. This match was not regarded official by the Yugoslav football association.

Between June and August 1931 he and several players from Botafogo FC such as Nilo and Carvalho Leite re-inforced CR Vasco da Gama, also from Rio, on a trip to Europe – the only second trip to Europe by a Brazilian club since the one of CA Paulistano in 1925. In twelve matches in Portugal and Spain – among others against FC Barcelona, FC Porto, and S.L. Benfica and Sporting CP in Lisbon – the team of Vasco, coached by Harry Welfare, won eight times.

Fernando Giudicelli remained in Europe and chose to play as a professional in Italy – football in Rio was still amateur sport back then – for FC Torino. He could do this, as he was considered an oriundo, an Italian emigrant returning home. His excellent technique found great acknowledgement, however, his lack of fighting spirit was widely criticised and put him at a disadvantage in the context of the style of football played in Italy back then. Giudicelli played from September 1931 until April 1933 for Torino. In the first season when Torino became eighth in the league, he generally was part of the standard formation, played 28 times scoring once. 1932–33 Torino finished seventh, Giudicelli playing only twelve times. After this season Torino released him.

Between the seasons 1931–32 and 32/33 he spent some time back in Rio. There he convinced Démosthenes Magalhães, his successor in the midfield of Fluminense, to join him at Torino. Démosthenes changed his name to Demostene Bertini, and thus got, at least initially away, with a claim to Italian origins. Also in the break between the next couple of seasons he was actively recruiting South American players for European engagements. Centre forward Attilio Bernasconi from CA All Boys in Buenos Aires moved on Giudicelli's initiative in 1933 to Torino.

It is reported, that after this time Giudicelli had an offer to join Argentine top side CA River Plate in Buenos Aires, however at the beginning of the season 1933–34 he joined the then Swiss first division club Young Fellows Zürich where it is known that the Black Miracle" Fausto dos Santos, another participant of the 1930 World Cup and Vasco's 1931 trip to Europe, played in 1933. In the winter break he returned to Rio, reportedly attempting to recruit players for Switzerland. Giudicelli did not return to Zürich, he was rather seen playing in Rio on the side of Heitor Canalli a 1934 World Cup participant who commenced the 1933–34 season with Torino and played there nine times, but considered the climate in northern Italy as "torture" – for America FC.

1934–35 Fernando Giudicelli played in Bordeaux in France, probably for Girondins. At the end of the season he returned once more to Brazil, this time convincing goalkeeper Jaguaré Bezerra de Vasconcelos of SC Corinthians Paulista and the defender Marins de Araújo Viana "Vianinha", probably from CA Paulista or also Corinthians, of opportunities awaiting in Italy. After their voyage across the Atlantic their first port of call was Lisbon, where they got news of the commencement of the Second Italo-Abyssinian War. Therefore, they decided not to continue their journey to their intended destination. However, soon they were taken on by Sporting CP where they were the first Brazilians in club history.

Giudicelli should only play two matches for the Lisbon side: one friendly and a match for the championship of Lisbon where he was sent off after discussions with the referee. Jaguaré stayed a bit longer with Sporting, winning the city championship, but then soon moved on to Olympique Marseille, where he should leave a lasting impression in the club's history. Vianinha stayed, with the exception of a brief interruption, in Portugal winning national championships with Sporting and FC Porto.

Fernando Giudicelli moved on to Real Madrid, becoming the first Brazilian in the club's history. In December 1935 he played against Racing Santander a sole league match for the club. After this he had a falling out with coach Francisco Bru, who in the consequence suspended him.

In January 1936 he was in France amongst speculation that he might join Olympique Lillois or FC Antibes. He ended up playing for the latter club for which he played 10 first division matches scoring one goal until the end of the season 1935–35, finishing twelfth out of 16. In 1936–37 Giudicelli played another 19 matches for the Antibois in which he scored seven goals. At the beginning of that season he was joined by Vininha, who played five league matches for the club, scoring twice, before returning to Portugal. Antibes finished the season 13th.
