= Démosthenes Magalhães =

Brazilian footballer

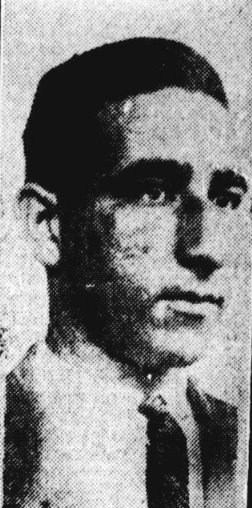
Démosthenes Magalhães, association football player of the 1930s (Fluminense FC, Torino FC, UC Sampdoria)

Démosthenes Magalhães, in Brazil better known as Démosthenes and in Italy as Demostene Bertini (born 17 November 1909, date of death unknown), was a Brazilian association football player. He was born in Rio de Janeiro.

In 1931 Démosthenes succeeded Fernando Giudicelli - who went on to play for FC Torino, being one of the first Brazilian men's footballers pursuing a career as a professional in Europe - in the mid-field of Fluminense FC in Rio de Janeiro.

On a visit to Rio in 1932 Giudicelli convinced Démosthenes to join him on the way back to Italy to play professionally too. As those days only people of Italian heritage, so-called Oriundi, were permitted to do so he changed his name to the more Italian sounding Demostene Bertini.

Thus, in the season 1932/33 Démosthenes played together with Giudicelli in Turin. The technically gifted player had an excellent start, but soon ran into difficulties with regards to defending his claim to Italian origin, which caused him to be sidelined for some time. After this, he found it difficult to live up to his potential, and frequently was left out of the starting line-up. Until the end of the season 1933/34 he ran up 30 matches for Torino, who finished 7th and 12th in those two seasons. After that he was transferred to Sampierdarenese of Genoa where he became part of their standard line-up and played in 28 league matches, finishing the season in 13th place.

In 1936 he took part in a friendly match for Fluminense, for which he thus played in total 39 times.
