= Vianinha =

Brazilian footballer

Personal information
- Full name: Marins Alves de Araújo Viana
- Date of birth: May 10, 1909
- Date of death: May 7, 1972 (aged 62)
- Place of death: São Paulo, Brazil
- Position: Defender

Senior career*
Years	Team	Apps	(Gls)
1935–1936	Sporting CP		(1)
1936	FC Antibes	5	(2)
1936–1939	FC Porto		
1940–1942	Santos FC		

Managerial career
- 1950–1951: Linense
- * Club domestic league appearances and goals

Marins Alves de Araújo Viana, also known as Vianinha (10 May 1909 – 7 May 1972), was a Brazilian football defender. He started in amateur football in São Jose do Rio Preto SP Brazil.When was to study in São Paulo originally the defender played probably for CA Paulista or SC Corinthians Paulista. Later he won championships im Portugal with Sporting CP and FC Porto. He also played for the French club FC Antibes. When returned to Brazil in 1940 played in Santos Football Club for 2 years the last club as professional player. In 1950/1951 as head coach was champion in State São Paulo, Brazil with the Linense FC in second division."Vianinha|" married in 1946. Left one son with the same name. Marins Vianna dead in 1972 in São Paulo Brazil.

== Career ==
Fernando Giudicelli – one of the first Brazilians to opt for a career as professional player in Europe in an era when football in Brazil was still an amateur sport, who also acted as a player agent helping South American footballers to engagements with European clubs – convinced Vianinha in 1935 alongside the Corinthians goalkeeper Jaguaré Bezerra de Vasconcelos to join him playing for a club in Italy. After their voyage across the Atlantic their first port of call was Lisbon, where they got news of the commencement of the Second Italo-Abyssinian War. Therefore, they decided not to continue their journey to their intended destination. However, soon they were taken on by Sporting CP where they were the first Brazilians in club history.

Giudicelli should only play two matches for the Lisbon side and move on to play for Real Madrid and in France. Jaguaré stayed a bit longer with Sporting, winning the city championship alongside Vianinha, but then soon moved on to Olympique Marseille, where he should leave a lasting impression in the club's history.

Vianinha stayed with Sporting and won in 1936 with the club the only second edition of the national championship. He was also part of the team that suffered on matchday two on 22 March 1936 a historic 1–10 defeat in Porto against FC Porto. Altogether he played 28 matches for Sporting, scoring one goal.

Later in the year he played at the early stages of the French league season 1936/37 alongside Giudicelli five matches for FC Antibes, where he scored two goals.

Later that year he returned to Portugal this time becoming the first Brazilian with FC Porto. Vianinha is considered one of the more important players of the side that won the Portuguese championship of 1936/37. It is reported that in the final of the 1936/37 championship against Sporting of Lisbon he kept Dados de Soeiro, the most dangerous of the attackers of Sporting, who scored in 219 matches 208 goals, in check and contributed with a penalty goal, which put Porto with 3-1 into the lead, to the 3–2 victory of his side. In 1938/39 he won with Porto the league championship.

== Honours ==
- League Championship of Portugal: 1936, 1939
- Championship of Portugal: 1937
- Championship of Lisbon: 1936
