= Rei (footballer) =

Brazilian footballer (1912–1986)

José Fontana (19 March 1912 – 3 April 1986), commonly known as Rei, was a Brazilian soccer player, who played as goalkeeper.

== Career ==
Rei began his career with Coritiba Foot Ball Club, but his good play took him to Vasco da Gama, where he replaced Jaguaré Bezerra de Vasconcelos when the latter went to FC Barcelona.

Rei got his nickname from his impeccable style of dressing, and was seen as a ladies' man, having lived with the famous singer Aracy de Almeida for four years.

Rei made his debut for the Brazil national football team in 1936.

== Titles ==
(Brazil) Coritiba

- Campeonato Paranaense: 1931

(Brazil) Vasco da Gama

- Campeonato Carioca: 1934 and 1936.
