= Tinoco (Brazilian footballer) =

Brazilian footballer (1904–1975)

Personal information
- Full name: Alfredo Alves Tinoco
- Date of birth: 2 December 1904
- Place of birth: Rio de Janeiro, Brazil
- Date of death: 4 July 1975 (aged 70)
- Position: Midfielder

Senior career*
Years	Team	Apps	(Gls)
1929–1934	Vasco da Gama		

International career
- Brazil
- * Club domestic league appearances and goals

Alfredo Alves Tinoco (2 December 1904 - 4 July 1975), known as just Tinoco, is a former Brazilian football player. He has played for Brazil national team.
