= Itália (footballer) =

Brazilian footballer (1907-1963)

Personal information
- Full name: Luiz Gervazoni
- Date of birth: 22 May 1907
- Place of birth: Rio de Janeiro, Brazil
- Date of death: 1963
- Position: Defender

Senior career*
| Years | Team | Apps | (Gls) |
| 1924–1925 | Bangu | 23 | (0) |
| 1926–1938 | Vasco da Gama | ? | (?) |

International career
| 1930–1932 | Brazil | 5 | (0) |
- * Club domestic league appearances and goals

Luiz Gervazoni (22 May 1907 – 1963), known as Itália, was a Brazilian football player from Rio de Janeiro. He played for the Brazil national team in the 1930 FIFA World Cup finals.

== Honours ==
=== Club ===
- Campeonato Carioca (3):

Vasco da Gama: 1929, 1934, 1936

=== National ===
- Copa Río Branco (1):

Brazil: 1932
