= Jaguaré (footballer) =

Brazilian footballer

Jaguaré Bezerra de Vasconcelos (14 May 1905 – 27 August 1946), generally known as Jaguaré in Brazil and as Jaguare de Besveconne Vasconcellos in France, was a Brazilian association football goalkeeper. When playing with CR Vasco da Gama, he won the championship of Rio de Janeiro. He also played for FC Barcelona, Sporting CP and SC Corinthians Paulista. The most successful period of his career was in the 1930s with the French club Olympique Marseille. In Brazil, he is also considered to be the person who popularised the use of gloves by goalkeepers.

== Life ==
=== Brazil, Spain and Portugal ===
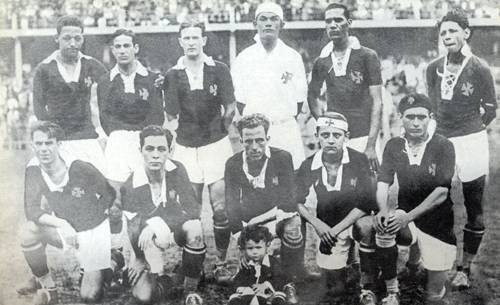
Vasco 1929: back: Tinoco, Brilhante, Itália, Jaguaré, Fausto, Mola; front: Pascoal, Oitenta-e-Quatro, Russinho, Mário Mattos, Santana

Jaguaré, who had no formal education, worked as a stevedore at the port of Rio. In his leisure time he enjoyed physical exercise and played football on the grounds of his neighbourhood of Saúde, a quarter close to the port, which is still marked today by the simple accommodations of the local labourers. There he impressed Espanhol, a defender with CR Vasco da Gama, who took him to a training session of his club in 1928. He impressed the other club members and established himself immediately as the new goalkeeper, after he had been told how to write his name so that he could register on match sheets.

In 1929, he was part of the team that won the championship of Rio de Janeiro. His most prominent teammates were the elegant midfielder Fausto dos Santos, considered the best of his era in Brasil, and Moacir Siqueira de Queirós Russinho, who were both to play for Brazil at the World Cup of 1930.

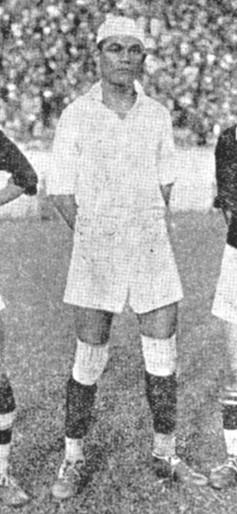
Jaguaré circa 1930, with typical mariner's cap

Jaguaré was also called up for the national team but, between 1928 and 1929, he played in only three unofficial matches against club teams from Scotland and Argentina.

Between June and August 1931, Vasco da Gama, reinforced with several players such as Nilo and Carvalho Leite from Botafogo FC, and also players from Rio, went on a trip to Europe. This was only the second trip to Europe by a Brazilian club, following that of CA Paulistano in 1925. In twelve matches in Portugal and Spain, against teams such as: FC Barcelona, FC Porto, S.L. Benfica and Sporting CP in Lisbon, the team of Vasco, coached by Harry Welfare, won eight times.

Jaguaré and Fausto dos Santos must have made an impression in the two matches against FC Barcelona, as both were given contracts to play for the club as professionals. In Brazil, at that time, football was still an amateur sport. However, Jaguaré, soon nicknamed Araña Negra ("black spider"), and dos Santos, could only be used in about a dozen friendly matches, as the rules of the association prevented foreigners from participating in official matches. FC Barcelona attempted to convince both players to naturalize and take up Spanish citizenship, but both refused, despite the excellent financial considerations offered.

Dos Santos moved on to Switzerland and Jaguaré returned to Brazil. It is reported that, at some point around this time, he turned up to train at his old club Vasco da Gama sporting goalkeeper gloves. This is considered to be the first use of gloves by a goalkeeper in Brazil. After he left Vasco to play professionally in Europe, however, he was no longer well regarded at the club and in Rio de Janeiro in general. To keep afloat financially, he travelled around with so-called "combinados", ad hoc teams, and allowed himself to be used as a figurehead for the marketing of various festivities and other events. From 1934 to 1935 he guarded the goal of SC Corinthians Paulista in São Paulo, where he ended up being replaced by José Hungarez, the first foreigner in the ranks of the Corinthians.

Fernando Giudicelli was one of the first Brazilians to opt for a career as a professional player in Europe in an era when football in Brazil was still an amateur sport. He also acted as a player agent helping South American footballers secure engagements at European clubs. In mid-1935, he convinced Jaguaré to join him playing for a club in Italy alongside the defender Marins Alves de Araújo Viana ("Vianinha"), who had probably also played previously for the Corinthians or for CA Paulista. After their voyage across the Atlantic, their first port of call was Lisbon, where they got news of the commencement of the Second Italo-Abyssinian War. Because of this they decided not to continue the journey to their intended destination. However, they were soon taken on by Sporting CP, the first Brazilians to play in club history.

Giudicelli was to play only two matches for the Lisbon side, then moved on to play for Real Madrid and in France. Jaguaré stayed a bit longer with Sporting, winning the city championship alongside Vianinha. After a total of seven matches for Sporting, Jaguaré found himself replaced by João Azevedo, who was to remain goalkeeper of the club for the next one and a half decades.

=== Glory days in France ===
In mid 1936, he joined the French first division club Olympique Marseille, where he replaced Laurent Di Lorto, who moved to FC Sochaux-Montbéliard, then a major force in French football. After Jaguaré's first season with Olympique, then coached by the Hungarian József Eisenhoffer, alongside some exceptional players from three continents, such as: Aznar, Ben Barek, Ben Bouali, Kohut, Weiskopf, and Zatelli, they won the national championship – the first such title in club history. In the following season, Marseille could not defend the title, finishing second behind Sochaux. But they won the Cup of France, defeating FC Metz 2–1 in the final. In Jaguaré's last season with the club, 1938/39, Marseille once again finished second in the league, this time behind FC Sète.

In 1937/38 he made history, scoring a penalty goal in Sète, securing the final result of 1–1. To date, this is the only goal by an Olympique Marseille goalkeeper in an official match. Later on in the same match, he stopped two penalty kicks by opponents, which hit the Marseille goal posts four times. He often vociferously encouraged opposing attackers to shoot, calling "chuta, chuta!". These and other eccentricities contributed to Jaguaré, who was nicknamed "El Jaguar" in Marseille, becoming a lasting part of club folklore.

After that season he left France, possibly in expectation of the approaching war. On his way back to Brazil, he stopped over in Porto, where he played for the first division club Académico FC. However, he did not feel very happy there and had difficulty integrating. Altogether he played nine times for the club, including two matches in the league.

=== Back in Brazil ===
In Rio de Janeiro, he reportedly still played for a brief period for São Cristóvão FR, a smaller club in the north of the city, which had won a championship in 1926. Jaguaré's circumstances were already in a state of decline; his small savings from his time in Europe were soon used up, and his consumption of alcohol had increased. He tried to return to his job as a stevedore.

On the job, his fellow workers did not find his stories about his time as a great footballer credible. Jaguaré soon disappeared. Later reports placed him in Santo Anastácio, a small town in the hinterland of the state of São Paulo. Here the stories about him vary. One says that he died after a run-in with the police, the other that he was imprisoned and banged his head against a wall of his cell and, shortly thereafter, died from his injuries. It is reported that he was interred in a pauper's grave. The date of his death is believed to be 27 August 1946.

== Honours ==
- Championship of Rio de Janeiro: 1929
- Championship of France: 1937
- Cup of France: 1938
