= Gragoatá =

Coordinates: 22°54′S 43°08′W

Gragoatá is one of the 48 administrative districts in the city Niterói, Rio de Janeiro in Brazil. It lies in the southern zone of the city, on the coast of the Guanabara Bay. It holds the main campus of the Fluminense Federal University.
