= Brilhante (footballer) =

Brazilian footballer (1904-1980)

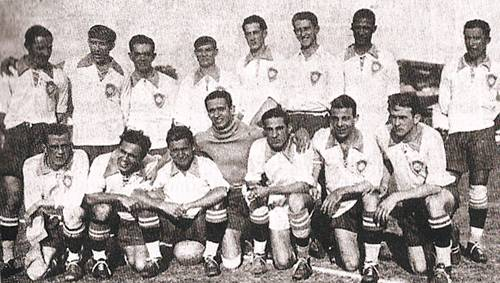
- Brilhante with World Cup 1930 team

Personal information
- Full name: Alfredo Brilhante da Costa
- Date of birth: 5 November 1904
- Place of birth: Rio de Janeiro, Brazil
- Date of death: 8 June 1980 (aged 75)
- Position: Defender

Senior career*
Years	Team	Apps	(Gls)
1922	America-RJ	?	(?)
1923	Bangu	14	(0)
1924–1933	Vasco da Gama	?	(?)
1933	Flamengo	0	(0)
1934–1935	Bangu	18	(1)

International career
1930	Brazil	1	(0)
- * Club domestic league appearances and goals

Alfredo Brilhante da Costa, best known as Brilhante (5 November 1904 – 8 June 1980) was a Brazilian football central defender. He was born in Rio de Janeiro.

During his career (1924–1933), he played in Bangu and in Vasco da Gama. He won the Rio de Janeiro State Championship in 1924 and 1929. For the Brazil national team, he participated at the 1930 FIFA World Cup, playing one match, against Yugoslavia. He died at 75 years old.

== Honours ==
=== Club ===
- Campeonato Carioca (2):

Vasco da Gama: 1924, 1929
