= Fausto dos Santos =

Brazilian footballer (1905-1939)

Personal information
- Full name: Fausto dos Santos
- Date of birth: 28 January 1905
- Place of birth: Rio de Janeiro, Brazil
- Date of death: 28 March 1939 (aged 34)
- Place of death: Santos Dumont, Brazil
- Height: 1.86 m (6 ft 1 in)
- Position: Midfielder

Senior career*
Years	Team	Apps	(Gls)
1926–1928	Bangu	53	(6)
1928–1931	Vasco da Gama	?	(?)
1931–1932	Barcelona	0	(0)
1933	YF Juventus	?	(?)
1933–1934	Vasco da Gama	?	(?)
1935	Nacional	?	(?)
1936–1937	Flamengo	80	(1)

International career
1930	Brazil	4	(0)
- * Club domestic league appearances and goals

Fausto dos Santos (28 January 1905 – 29 March 1939), sometimes known as just Fausto, was a football (soccer) player, considered one of the best defensive midfielders of Vasco da Gama of the first half of past century. At the time, he and Jaguaré, another famous player at this era, was attempted to be loaned to Barcelona.

Popularly known as "Fausto, The Black Wonder" he was a pioneer to vindicate labor laws to footballers since the professionalization of Brazilian football in the beginning of the 1930s.

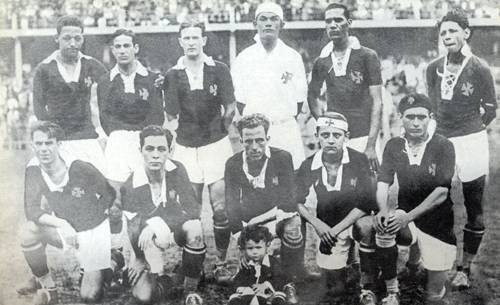
CR Vasco da Gama 1929

He also played for other clubs, such as Bangu, Nacional of Montevideo and Flamengo. He died at the age of 34 of tuberculosis.

== Honours ==
=== Club ===
- Campeonato Carioca (2):

Vasco da Gama: 1929, 1934

- Copa Catalunya (1):

Barcelona: 1932
