= List of São Paulo FC managers =

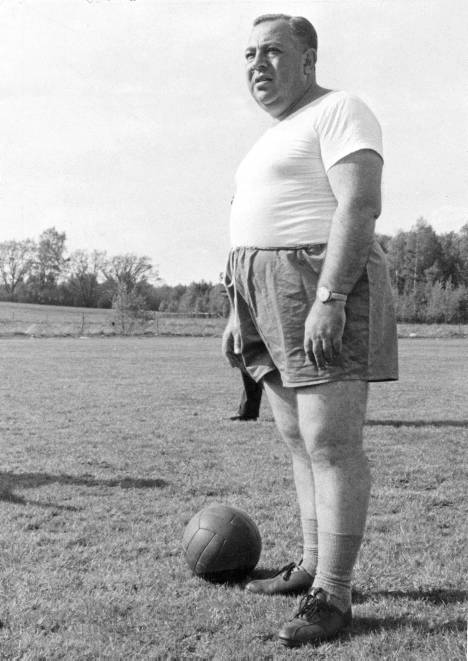
Vicente Feola was the coach who led the team more often, between 1938 and 1960, in 8 times with 532 matches.

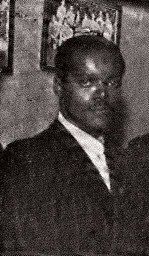
Leônidas da Silva was a successful São Paulo's player in the 40s and made a quickly manager career after his retirement training the Tricolor in 4 opportunities.

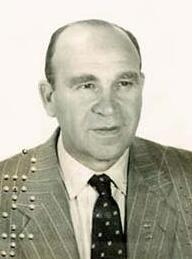
The famous Hungarian head coach Bela Guttmann, made a winning performance in 1957-58 with a Campeonato Paulista title in 1957.

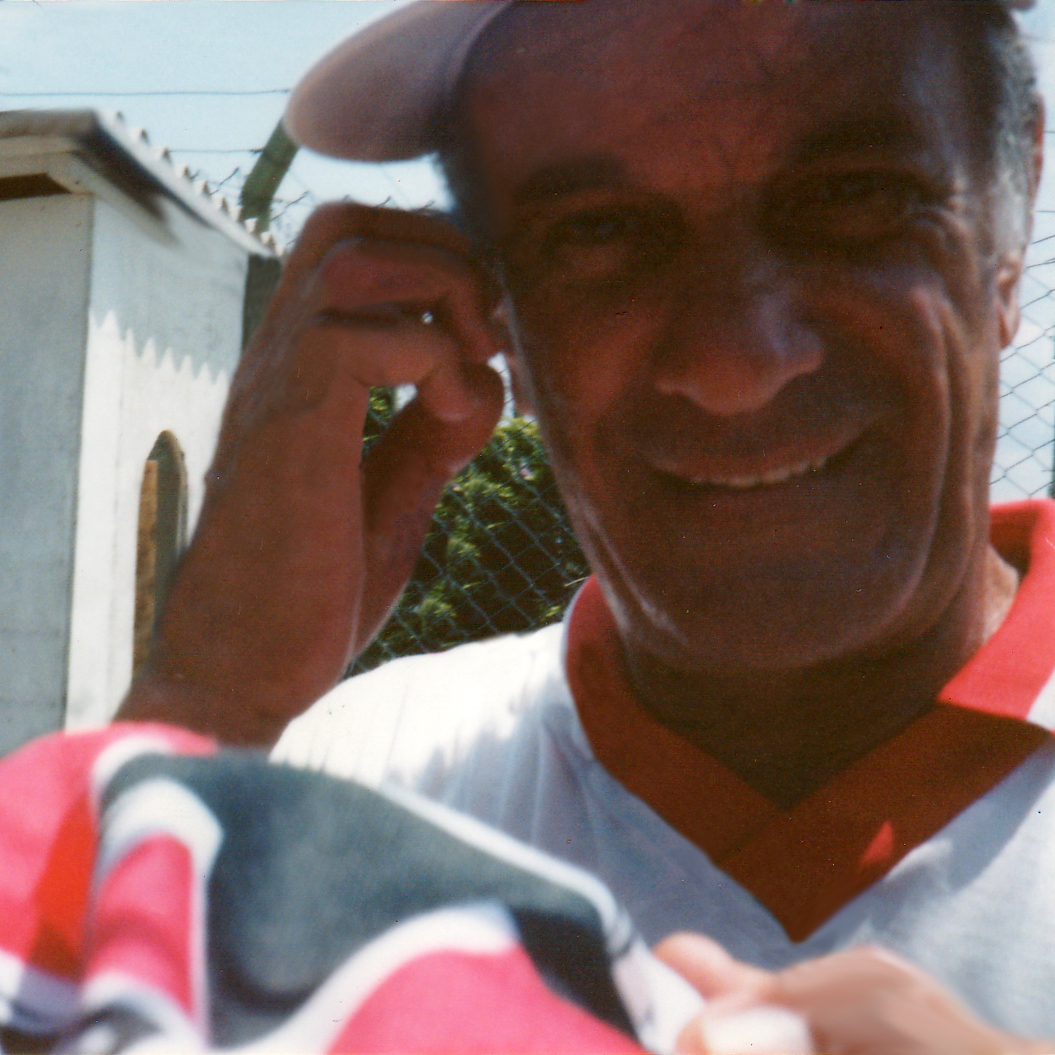
Telê Santana, known as Master Telê is acclaimed as the greatest coach in the club's history. Won 10 titles in only 6 years including the Copa Libertadores and Intercontinental Cup.

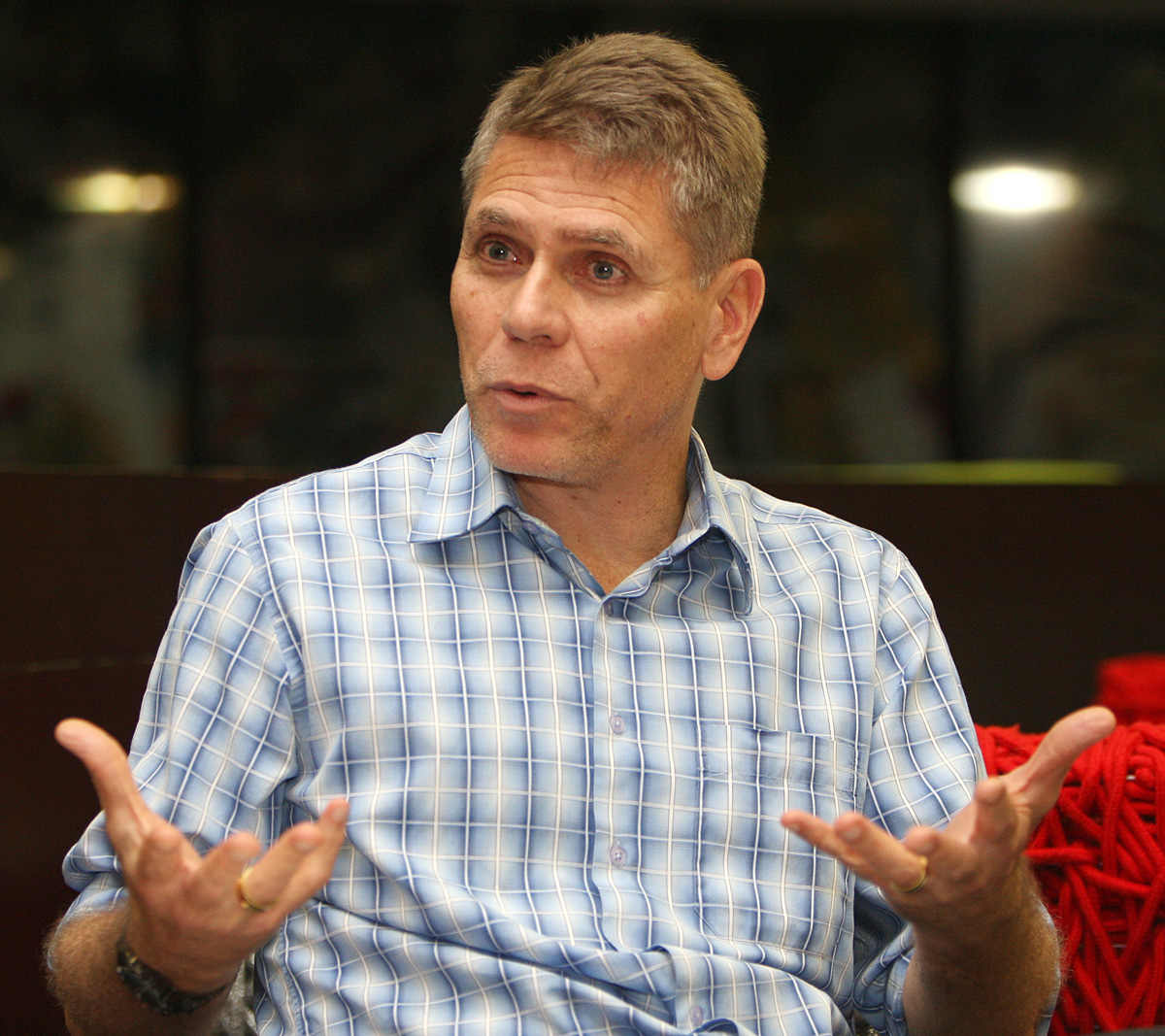
Paulo Autuori was in charge of the team in 2005, in only 8 months won the Copa Libertadores and FIFA Club World Championship.

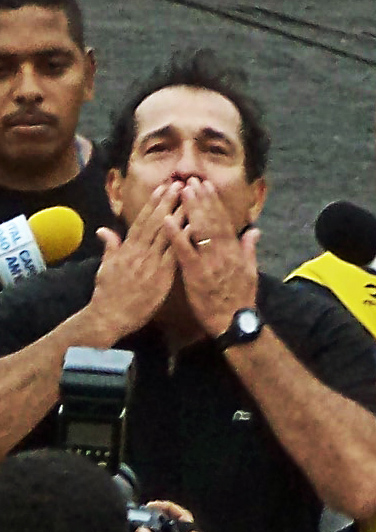
Muricy Ramalho is respected by his deeds under São Paulo's command, as the Copa Conmebol title with second team in 1994 and the 3 national titles won in a row in 2006, 2007 and 2008.

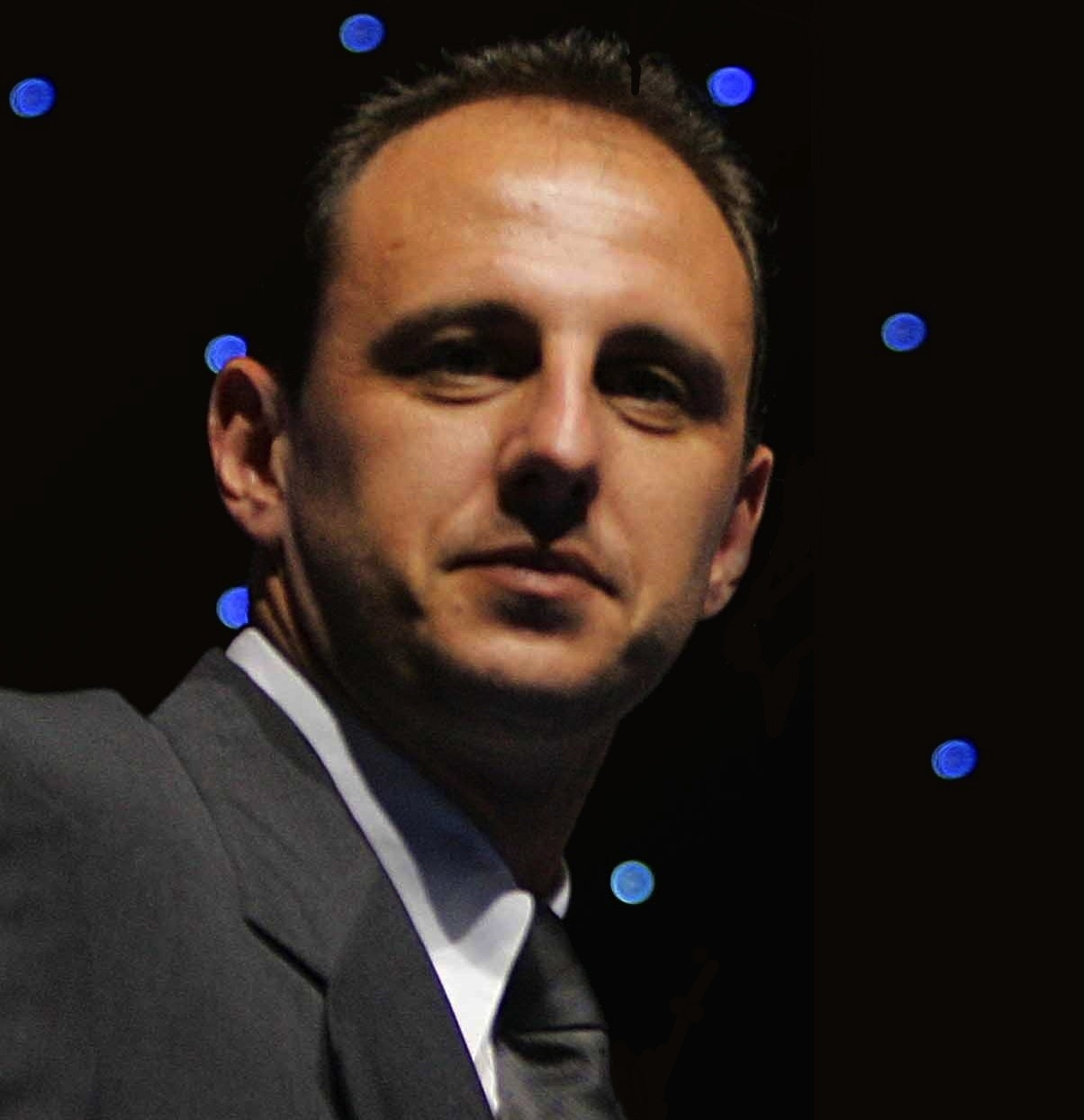
Rogério Ceni made history such a player with most record broken by The Dearest as goalkeeper in 26 years of career, being head coach 1 year after his retirement.

The following is a list of São Paulo Futebol Clube managers throughout the club's history. From the foundation of the club on January 26, 1930, there have been 83 head coaches - 67 Brazilian nationals, and 16 foreigners including five Uruguayans, five Argentines, three Hungarians, one Portuguese, one Chilean and one Colombian. Twenty one managers have won official titles by Tricolor resulting in 12 international and 29 national honours.

The first coach in São Paulo's history was Rubens Salles, a former defensive midfielder of extinct Club Athletico Paulistano, who played as a professional between 1906 and 1920. Salles led the team for 4 years, in the period which the club was known as São Paulo da Floresta, winning the Campeonato Paulista (State of São Paulo league) in 1931 and being runners-up in 1930, 1932 and 1933. He also participated in the campaign that led Tricolor to the second place in 1934. His career ended prematurely due to his death on July 21 of the same year.

The club underwent rapid changes following Salles's death, facing internal disagreements and fast dissociations which culminated in the closure and rebuilding of football activities in December 1935. Since then, the team remained for eight years without a title, 12 altogether from 1931 that were interrupted by the group's of Portuguese coach Joreca. He coached the Tricolor between the years 1943 and 1947 when he won state championships of 1943 (without defeat under his command), 1945 (with only two setbacks) and 1946 (undefeated).

In the subsequent years from the successful seasons of Joreca by São Paulo, the club won two titles in a row in 1948 and 1949 under command of the famous manager Vicente Feola who had coached the team on several occasions. Feola would be later known for leading the Brazil to their first World Cup title in 1958, defeating Sweden. The team came back to win the state title in 1953 with the Argentine Jim López and 1958 under the command of experienced Hungarian coach Béla Guttmann, who coached other major teams, such as Milan, Peñarol, Porto and Benfica.

The 60s was marked by another title drought, this time influenced by the construction of the Morumbi Stadium and the period of hegemony of rivals Santos and Palmeiras who dominated"the state and national tournaments from 1958 to 1969.

Tricolor returned to the top of the state championship in 1970 with Zezé Moreira, in 1971 with Osvaldo Brandão and 1975 under the command of Argentine club idol José Poy. Poy played goalkeeper in São Paulo from 1948 to 1962 and was considered for an appointment as manager for the Brazil in the 1954 World Cup. After his retirement, Poy helped the club on the construction of Morumbi having sold nearly 8000 titles of guaranteed spots, one of the main sources of income of the work. The former goalkeeper led the team in 5 occasions, reaching remarkable results as the vice championships in the state league in 1982, and national league of 1971 and 1973, and to the 1974 Copa Libertadores, losing to the most successful club in the history of continental tournament, then four-time champions, Independiente.

The national title that had was not achieved under the command of Poy was finally achieved by Rubens Minelli in 1977 who had been the winning coach in the two previous editions on the managing of Internacional, becoming the first head coach to won three Brazilian league titles in a row and the first by São Paulo. The event was taken in a single final match against Atlético Mineiro in Belo Horizonte. After regulation, the score was 0-0, but São Paulo won a 3-2 penalty shootout victory by in front of 102,974 rival supporters.

In the 80s, São Paulo had winning seasons - adding 5 more state titles along with a second national title in 1986. Carlos Alberto Silva made two quick successful rounds at the seasons of 1980-81 and 1989-90 when reached 2 titles of Campeonato Paulista respectively in 1980 and 1989. In the following years with Formiga, 1981, and Cilinho for 2 times, 1985 and 1987, The Dearest won the state championship again. The second national trophy became in 1986 with an young group players who was called as Menudos do Morumbi in reference to the famous 70s Puerto Rican boy band Menudo (band). The team was trained by former player and 2 times world champion Pepe that received a group assembled by Cilinho. The team was formed by promising players as Müller, Silas and Sidney; and experienced like Daryo Pereira, Careca and Pita.

The 90s decade was the most victory period of Tricolor's history, under the command of Telê Santana, who was called as Mestre Telê (Master Telê) by the fans, the club won 7 international tournaments in only 3 years, from 1992 to 1994, among the Copa Libertadores and Intercontinental Cup in 1992 and 1993; the Recopa Sudamericana in 1993 and 1994 along the Supercopa Sudamericana in 1993. During the 6 years who trained the team Telê broke a Brazilian stigma created in the 80s due his participations in the 1982 and 1986 FIFA World Cup when the coach was eliminated with Brazil National Team at the final stage of the tournament. In 1994, the assistant coach Muricy Ramalho, who made history playing for São Paulo in the 70s, took an important place again by winning the Copa Conmebol with only young and reserve players when the team was called as Expressinho (Little Express Train) in refer to the performance of the club during the tournament. In 1996 Telê Santana left the club after 6 years and then the team passed for a long period of fewer and inexpressive titles. Tricolor was champion in the Campeonato Paulista in 1998 being trained by Nelsinho Baptista and won it again 2 years later.

Between 2005 and 2008, the club enjoyed a successful spell under the management of Paulo Autuori, who won the 2005 Copa Libertadores and the 2005 FIFA Club World Cup, and then with the return of Muricy Ramalho, who won three league titles in a row. Ney Franco is the manager to have most recently an honour for the club, the 2012 Copa Sudamericana.

== List of managers ==
- Figures correct as of 4 November 2026. Includes all official matches

This list of all managers includes performance records and honours.
P = Matches played; W = Matches won; D = Matches drawn; L = Matches lost; GF = Goals for; GA = Goals against

Name	Nation	From	To	P	W	D	L	GF	GA	Win%	Honours
Rubens Salles	BRA	16 March 1930	8 June 1930	16	8	6	2	(n/a)	(n/a)	50%	
Ramón Platero	URU	8 July 1930	28 December 1930	18	13	5	0	(n/a)	(n/a)	72%	
Rubens Salles	BRA	1931	10 January 1932	25	19	5	1	(n/a)	(n/a)	77%	see below
Formiga	BRA	6 April 1932	15 May 1932	6	2	1	3	(n/a)	(n/a)	39%	
Jenő Medgyessy	HUN	May 1932	January 1933	13	12	1	0	(n/a)	(n/a)	95%	
Clodô	BRA	March 1933	1935	74	52	11	11	(n/a)	(n/a)	76%	
Armando Del Debbio	BRA	1936	1937	42	13	9	20	(n/a)	(n/a)	38%	
Vicente Feola	BRA	1937	1938	(n/a)	(n/a)	(n/a)	(n/a)	(n/a)	(n/a)	(n/a)	
Tito Rodrigues	ARG	1938	1938	8	3	1	4	(n/a)	(n/a)	41%	
Vicente Feola	BRA	1938	1939	(n/a)	(n/a)	(n/a)	(n/a)	(n/a)	(n/a)	(n/a)	
Ignác Amsel	HUN	May 1939	October 1939	21	9	1	11	(n/a)	(n/a)	44%	
Décio Pedroso ^{c}	BRA	1939	1939	(n/a)	(n/a)	(n/a)	(n/a)	(n/a)	(n/a)	(n/a)	
Armando Gomes ^{c}	BRA	1939	1939	(n/a)	(n/a)	(n/a)	(n/a)	(n/a)	(n/a)	(n/a)	
Amílcar Barbuy	BRA	1939	1940	19	12	0	7	(n/a)	(n/a)	63%	
Ramón Platero	URU	May 1940	December 1940	36	13	6	17	(n/a)	(n/a)	42%	
Vicente Feola	BRA	1941	1942	(n/a)	(n/a)	(n/a)	(n/a)	(n/a)	(n/a)	(n/a)	
Conrado Ross	URU	March 1942	May 1943	49	27	12	10	(n/a)	(n/a)	63%	
Joreca	POR	May 1943	October 1947	172	115	31	26	(n/a)	(n/a)	73%	see below
Alberto Zarzur ^{c}	BRA	1947	1947	5	4	0	1	(n/a)	(n/a)	80%	
Vicente Feola	BRA	1947	1950	(n/a)	(n/a)	(n/a)	(n/a)	(n/a)	(n/a)	(n/a)	see below
Leônidas da Silva	BRA	1950	1951	(n/a)	(n/a)	(n/a)	(n/a)	(n/a)	(n/a)	(n/a)	
Ariston de Oliveira	BRA	1951	1951	16	8	2	6	(n/a)	(n/a)	54%	
Vicente Feola	BRA	1951	1953	(n/a)	(n/a)	(n/a)	(n/a)	(n/a)	(n/a)	(n/a)	
Jim López	ARG	June 1953	October 1954	(n/a)	(n/a)	(n/a)	(n/a)	(n/a)	(n/a)	(n/a)	see below
Leônidas da Silva	BRA	1954	1955	(n/a)	(n/a)	(n/a)	(n/a)	(n/a)	(n/a)	(n/a)	
Vicente Feola	BRA	1955	1957	(n/a)	(n/a)	(n/a)	(n/a)	(n/a)	(n/a)	(n/a)	see below
Hélio Caxambu ^{c}	BRA	1957	1957	(n/a)	(n/a)	(n/a)	(n/a)	(n/a)	(n/a)	(n/a)	
Béla Guttmann	HUN	March 1957	January 1958	97	46	28	23	(n/a)	(n/a)	57%	see below
Manoel Raymundo ^{c}	BRA	1958	1958	(n/a)	(n/a)	(n/a)	(n/a)	(n/a)	(n/a)	(n/a)	
Armando Renganeschi	ARG	August 1958	May 1959	56	33	14	9	(n/a)	(n/a)	67%	
Vicente Feola	BRA	1959	1960	(n/a)	(n/a)	(n/a)	(n/a)	(n/a)	(n/a)	(n/a)	
Remo Januzzi	BRA	1960	1960	14	4	3	7	(n/a)	(n/a)	36%	
Flávio Costa	BRA	1960	1961	65	23	17	25	(n/a)	(n/a)	44%	
Manoel Raymundo ^{c}	BRA	1961	1961	(n/a)	(n/a)	(n/a)	(n/a)	(n/a)	(n/a)	(n/a)	
Cláudio Cardoso	BRA	1961	1961	22	15	3	4	(n/a)	(n/a)	73%	
Hélio Caxambu ^{c}	BRA	1961	1961	(n/a)	(n/a)	(n/a)	(n/a)	(n/a)	(n/a)	(n/a)	
Aymoré Moreira	BRA	1962	1962	(n/a)	(n/a)	(n/a)	(n/a)	(n/a)	(n/a)	(n/a)	
Hélio Caxambu ^{c}	BRA	1962	1962	(n/a)	(n/a)	(n/a)	(n/a)	(n/a)	(n/a)	(n/a)	
Osvaldo Brandão	BRA	1962	1964	(n/a)	(n/a)	(n/a)	(n/a)	(n/a)	(n/a)	(n/a)	
Otto Vieira	BRA	1964	1964	30	14	10	6	(n/a)	(n/a)	58%	
José Poy	ARG	January 1964	February 1965	(n/a)	(n/a)	(n/a)	(n/a)	(n/a)	(n/a)	(n/a)	
Jim López	ARG	August 1965	December 1965	(n/a)	(n/a)	(n/a)	(n/a)	(n/a)	(n/a)	(n/a)	
Aymoré Moreira	BRA	1966	1966	(n/a)	(n/a)	(n/a)	(n/a)	(n/a)	(n/a)	(n/a)	
Sylvio Pirillo	BRA	1967	1968	85	40	25	20	(n/a)	(n/a)	57%	
Diede Lameiro	BRA	1968	1969	85	40	18	27	(n/a)	(n/a)	54%	
Zezé Moreira	BRA	1970	1970	59	21	20	18	(n/a)	(n/a)	47%	see below
Osvaldo Brandão	BRA	1971	1971	(n/a)	(n/a)	(n/a)	(n/a)	(n/a)	(n/a)	(n/a)	see below
José Poy	ARG	October 1971	December 1971	13	7	4	2	17	8	69%	
Alfredo Ramos	BRA	1972	1972	42	23	15	4	(n/a)	(n/a)	67%	
Cosme Geraldino ^{c}	BRA	7 September 1972	10 September 1972	2	1	0	1	(n/a)	(n/a)	50%	
Vail Mota	BRA	1972	1972	10	2	4	4	(n/a)	(n/a)	33%	
José Poy	ARG	October 1972	December 1972	17	11	2	4	42	20	71%	
Telê Santana	BRA	January 1973	June 1973	30	11	13	6	30	24	58%	
José Poy	ARG	July 1973	October 1976	241	112	92	37	313	156	66%	see below
Mário Juliato ^{c}	BRA	October 1976	December 1976	9	5	2	2	12	6	(n/a)	
Rubens Minelli	BRA	1977	1979	168	79	48	41	(n/a)	(n/a)	57%	see below
Mário Juliato	BRA	February 1979	November 1979	66	26	22	18	76	58	(n/a)	
Carlos Alberto Silva	BRA	1980	1981	(n/a)	(n/a)	(n/a)	(n/a)	(n/a)	(n/a)	(n/a)	see below
João Leal Neto ^{c}	BRA	1981	1981	18	9	1	8	(n/a)	(n/a)	52%	
Chico Formiga	BRA	1981	1982	71	42	10	19	(n/a)	(n/a)	64%	see below
José Poy	ARG	June 1982	May 1983	73	43	16	14	126	62	(n/a)	
José Carlos Serrão ^{c}	BRA	1983	1983	1	1	0	0	(n/a)	(n/a)	(n/a)	
Mário Travaglini	BRA	1983	1984	64	29	24	11	(n/a)	(n/a)	58%	
Valdir de Moraes ^{c}	BRA	1984	1984	17	7	6	4	(n/a)	(n/a)	53%	
Cilinho	BRA	1984	1986	(n/a)	(n/a)	(n/a)	(n/a)	(n/a)	(n/a)	(n/a)	see below
José Carlos Serrão ^{c}	BRA	1986	1986	(n/a)	(n/a)	(n/a)	(n/a)	(n/a)	(n/a)	(n/a)	
Pepe	BRA	1986	1987	45	22	16	7	(n/a)	(n/a)	61%	see below
José Carlos Serrão ^{c}	BRA	1987	1987	(n/a)	(n/a)	(n/a)	(n/a)	(n/a)	(n/a)	(n/a)	
Cilinho	BRA	1987	1989	(n/a)	(n/a)	(n/a)	(n/a)	(n/a)	(n/a)	(n/a)	see below
Pupo Gimenez ^{c}	BRA	1989	1989	(n/a)	(n/a)	(n/a)	(n/a)	(n/a)	(n/a)	(n/a)	
Carlos Alberto Silva	BRA	1989	1990	(n/a)	(n/a)	(n/a)	(n/a)	(n/a)	(n/a)	(n/a)	see below
Pupo Gimenez	BRA	1990	1990	(n/a)	(n/a)	(n/a)	(n/a)	(n/a)	(n/a)	(n/a)	
Pablo Forlán	URU	May 1990	October 1990	29	12	11	6	(n/a)	(n/a)	41%	
Telê Santana	BRA	October 1990	January 1996	382	187	109	86	(n/a)	(n/a)	48%	see below
Muricy Ramalho ^{c}	BRA	January 1996	July 1996	40	23	10	7	(n/a)	(n/a)	57%	see below
Carlos Alberto Parreira	BRA	August 1996	October 1996	21	7	6	8	(n/a)	(n/a)	33%	
Muricy Ramalho	BRA	November 1996	April 1997	31	13	13	5	(n/a)	(n/a)	41%	
Dario Pereyra	URU	April 1997	February 1998	63	25	22	16	(n/a)	(n/a)	39%	
Nelsinho Baptista	BRA	February 1998	September 1998	40	20	6	14	79	60	50%	see below
Pita ^{c}	BRA	September 1998	September 1998	2	1	1	0	3	1	50%	
Mário Sérgio	BRA	September 1998	November 1998	10	3	1	6	15	14	30%	
Paulo César Carpegiani	BRA	January 1999	December 1999	67	40	7	20	144	84	59%	
Milton Cruz ^{c}	BRA	December 1999	December 1999	1	1	0	0	2	1	100%	
Levir Culpi	BRA	January 2000	November 2000	78	42	18	18	161	110	53%	see below
Vadão	BRA	January 2001	May 2001	30	16	4	10	71	44	53%	see below
Nelsinho Baptista	BRA	June 2001	May 2002	68	32	16	20	152	100	47%	
Oswaldo de Oliveira	BRA	May 2002	May 2003	59	32	13	14	131	82	54%	see below
Roberto Rojas	CHI	May 2003	December 2003	52	28	13	11	95	65	53%	
Cuca	BRA	16 December 2003	2 September 2004	50	29	8	13	63	49	58%	
Emerson Leão	BRA	3 September 2004	30 April 2005	45	27	12	6	106	48	60%	see below
Milton Cruz ^{c}	BRA	April 2005	April 2005	3	0	2	1	3	4	0%	
Paulo Autuori	BRA	29 April 2005	29 December 2005	55	26	11	18	104	77	47%	see below
Muricy Ramalho	BRA	3 January 2006	20 June 2009	252	139	67	46	412	223	55%	see below
Milton Cruz ^{c}	BRA	June 2009	June 2009	1	0	0	1	1	3	0%	
Ricardo Gomes	BRA	21 June 2009	6 August 2010	75	38	16	21	123	78	50%	
Milton Cruz ^{c}	BRA	August 2010	August 2010	1	0	1	0	1	1	0%	
Sérgio Baresi ^{c}	BRA	11 August 2010	3 October 2010	14	5	4	5	18	23	35%	
Paulo César Carpegiani	BRA	4 October 2010	7 July 2011	47	30	4	13	79	50	63%	
Milton Cruz ^{c}	BRA	July 2011	July 2011	2	2	0	0	5	1	100%	
Adílson Batista	BRA	17 July 2011	17 October 2011	22	7	9	6	35	30	31%	
Milton Cruz ^{c}	BRA	October 2011	October 2011	2	1	1	0	1	0	50%	
Emerson Leão	BRA	24 October 2011	26 June 2012	44	26	6	12	82	49	59%	
Milton Cruz ^{c}	BRA	27 June 2012	5 July 2012	2	2	0	0	6	3	100%	
Ney Franco	BRA	6 July 2012	5 July 2013	79	41	16	22	127	73	51%	see below
Milton Cruz ^{c}	BRA	July 2013	July 2013	2	0	0	2	1	4	0%	
Paulo Autuori	BRA	11 July 2013	9 September 2013	17	3	4	10	12	23	17%	
Muricy Ramalho	BRA	9 September 2013	5 April 2015	110	59	22	30	175	111	53%	
Milton Cruz ^{c}	BRA	8 April 2015	23 May 2015	10	7	0	3	17	6	70%	
Juan Carlos Osorio	COL	6 June 2015	3 October 2015	26	11	7	8	34	27	42%	
Doriva	BRA	14 October 2015	8 November 2015	7	2	1	4	10	13	28%	
Milton Cruz ^{c}	BRA	19 November 2015	6 December 2015	4	3	0	1	9	10	75%	
Edgardo Bauza	ARG	30 January 2016	24 July 2016	46	17	12	17	55	48	36%	
André Jardine ^{c}	BRA	7 August 2016	14 August 2016	2	1	0	1	2	2	50%	
Ricardo Gomes	BRA	16 August 2016	20 November 2016	19	6	5	7	18	16	31%	
Pintado ^{c}	BRA	27 November 2016	11 December 2016	2	2	0	0	7	1	100%	
Rogério Ceni	BRA	19 January 2017	2 July 2017	37	14	13	10	55	42	37%	
Pintado ^{c}	BRA	9 July 2017	9 July 2017	1	0	0	1	2	3	0%	
Dorival Júnior	BRA	13 July 2017	9 March 2018	40	17	11	12	50	45	42%	
André Jardine ^{c}	BRA	11 March 2018	14 March 2018	2	2	0	0	6	1	100%	
Diego Aguirre	URU	17 March 2018	11 November 2018	44	20	14	10	52	37	45%	
André Jardine	BRA	15 November 2018	13 February 2019	15	4	3	8	13	17	26%	
Vagner Mancini ^{c}	BRA	17 February 2019	30 March 2019	9	3	4	2	8	6	33%	
Cuca	BRA	7 April 2019	25 September 2019	26	9	10	7	24	19	34%	
Fernando Diniz	BRA	28 September 2019	31 January 2021	77	35	21	21	120	89	45%	
Marcos Vizolli ^{c}	BRA	31 January 2021	12 February 2021	5	2	2	1	6	5	40%	
Hernán Crespo	ARG	12 February 2021	13 October 2021	57	24	21	12	90	54	42%	see below
Rogério Ceni	BRA	13 October 2021	19 April 2023	106	49	28	29	156	107	46%	
Dorival Júnior	BRA	20 April 2023	7 January 2024	54	25	13	16	64	46	46%	see below
Thiago Carpini	BRA	11 January 2024	18 April 2024	18	7	6	5	26	19	39%	see below
Milton Cruz ^{c}	BRA	18 April 2024	21 April 2024	1	1	0	0	3	0	100%	
Luis Zubeldía	ARG	19 April 2024	16 June 2025	80	37	25	18	107	73	46%	
Hernán Crespo	ARG	18 June 2025	9 March 2026	46	21	7	18	56	56	46%	
Roger Machado	BRA	10 March 2026	13 May 2026	17	7	4	6	20	17	41%	
Milton Cruz ^{c}	BRA	14 May 2026	17 May 2026	1	0	0	1	1	2	0%	
Dorival Júnior	BRA	18 May 2026		24	7	8	9	25	26	29%	

== Managers with official honours ==
Name	Nation	Tenure	Honours
Rubens Salles	BRA	1930, 1931–32	Campeonato Paulista: 1 (1931)
Joreca	POR	1943–47	Campeonato Paulista: 3 (1943, 1945, 1946)
Vicente Feola	BRA	1937, 1938–39, 1941–42, 1947–50, 1950–51, 1952–53, 1955–57, 1959–60	Campeonato Paulista: 2 (1948, 1949)
Jim López	ARG	1953–54	Campeonato Paulista: 1 (1953)
Béla Guttmann	HUN	1957–58	Campeonato Paulista: 1 (1957)
Zezé Moreira	BRA	1970	Campeonato Paulista: 1 (1970)
Osvaldo Brandão	BRA	1962–64, 1971	Campeonato Paulista: 1 (1971)
José Poy	ARG	1964–65, 1971, 1972, 1973–76, 1982–83	Campeonato Paulista: 1 (1975)
Rubens Minelli	BRA	1977–79	Campeonato Brasileiro: 1 (1977)
Carlos Alberto Silva	BRA	1980–81, 1989–90	Campeonato Paulista: 2 (1980, 1989)
Chico Formiga	BRA	1981–82	Campeonato Paulista: 1 (1981)
Cilinho	BRA	1984–86, 1987–88	Campeonato Paulista: 2 (1985, 1987)
Pepe	BRA	1986–87	Campeonato Brasileiro: 1 (1986)
Telê Santana	BRA	1973, 1990–96	Intercontinental Cup: 2 (1992, 1993); Copa Libertadores: 2 (1992, 1993); Supercopa Libertadores: 1 (1993); Recopa Sudamericana: 2 (1993, 1994); Campeonato Brasileiro: 1 (1991); Campeonato Paulista: 2 (1991, 1992)
Muricy Ramalho	BRA	1994, 1996–97, 2006–09, 2013–15	Campeonato Brasileiro: 3 (2006, 2007, 2008); Copa Conmebol: 1 (1994); Copa Masters CONMEBOL: 1 (1996)
Nelsinho Baptista	BRA	1998, 2001–02	Campeonato Paulista: 1 (1998)
Levir Culpi	BRA	2000	Campeonato Paulista: 1 (2000)
Vadão	BRA	2001	Torneio Rio-São Paulo: 1 (2001)
Oswaldo de Oliveira	BRA	2002–03	Supercampeonato Paulista: 1 (2002)
Émerson Leão	BRA	2004–05, 2011–12	Campeonato Paulista: 1 (2005)
Paulo Autuori	BRA	2005, 2013	FIFA Club World Cup: 1 (2005); Copa Libertadores: 1 (2005)
Ney Franco	BRA	2012–13	Copa Sudamericana: 1 (2012)
Hernán Crespo	ARG	2021, 2025–26	Campeonato Paulista: 1 (2021)
Dorival Júnior	BRA	2017–18, 2023–24, 2026–	Copa do Brasil: 1 (2023)
Thiago Carpini	BRA	2024	Supercopa do Brasil: 1 (2024)
