= 1936 São Paulo FC season =

São Paulo
1936 season
- Chairman: Manoel de Carmo Mecca (until February 29); Frederico Antônio Germano Menzen
- Manager: Armando Del Debbio
- Campeonato Paulista: 8th
- Top goalscorer: League: Chemp (6); All: Chemp (6)

The 1936 football season was São Paulo's 7th season since the club's founding in 1930.

== Statistics ==
=== Scorers ===
| Position | Nation | Playing position | Name | Campeonato Paulista | Others | Total |
|---|---|---|---|---|---|---|
| 1 | (Brazil) | | Chemp | 6 | 0 | 6 |
| 2 | (Brazil) | | Gabardo | 3 | 2 | 5 |
| = | (Brazil) | | Ministrinho | 5 | 0 | 5 |
| 3 | (Brazil) | | Adolpho | 3 | 0 | 3 |
| = | (Brazil) | | Tino | 3 | 0 | 3 |
| 4 | (Brazil) | | Alemão | 0 | 2 | 2 |
| = | (Brazil) | | Antoninho | 0 | 2 | 2 |
| = | (Brazil) | | Fogueira | 0 | 2 | 2 |
| = | (Brazil) | | Paulinho | 1 | 1 | 2 |
| 5 | (Brazil) | | Armandinho | 0 | 1 | 1 |
| = | (Brazil) | | Aurélio | 1 | 0 | 1 |
| = | (Brazil) | | Barbosa | 1 | 0 | 1 |
| = | (Brazil) | | Carioca | 1 | 0 | 1 |
| = | (Brazil) | | Carrazo | 0 | 1 | 1 |
| = | (Brazil) | | Coelho | 1 | 0 | 1 |
| = | (Brazil) | | Iamond | 0 | 1 | 1 |
| = | (Brazil) | | José | 0 | 1 | 1 |
| = | (Brazil) | | Ruy | 0 | 1 | 1 |
| | | | Own Goals | 2 | 0 | 0 |
| | | | Total | 27 | 17 | 44 |

=== Overall ===
| Games played | 34 (21 Campeonato Paulista, 13 Friendly match) |
| Games won | 11 (7 Campeonato Paulista, 4 Friendly match) |
| Games drawn | 7 (2 Campeonato Paulista, 5 Friendly match) |
| Games lost | 16 (12 Campeonato Paulista, 4 Friendly match) |
| Goals scored | 44 |
| Goals conceded | 50 |
| Goal difference | -6 |
| Best result | 6–0 (H) v Paulista - Campeonato Paulista - 1937.01.03 |
| Worst result | 1–5 (A) v Portuguesa Santista - Campeonato Paulista - 1936.08.16 |
| Most appearances | |
| Top scorer | Chemp (6) |

Source: São Paulo FC

== Friendlies ==
| January 25 National | São Paulo | 3–2 | Portuguesa Santista | São Paulo |
| | Antoninho 10'; Ruy 50'; Carrazo 63' | | Franco III 35', 60' | Stadium: Estádio Palestra Itália (Parque Antarctica); Referee: Heitor Domingues |

| February 16 National | Portuguesa Santista | 2–4 | São Paulo | Santos |
| | Juvenal 61' (o.g.); Quim 80' | | Fogueira 30', 38'; Gabardo 50'; Armandinho 52' | Stadium: Estádio Ulrico Mursa; Referee: Chaves Pires |

| March 1 National | Juventus | 2–3 | São Paulo | São Paulo |
| | Nico 14'; Otávio 48' | | Gabardo 10'; Iamond 19'; José 80' | Stadium: Estádio Conde Rodolfo Crespi (Rua Javari) |

| March 22 National | Corinthians | 3–1 | São Paulo | São Paulo |
| | Teleco 33', 63', 87' | | Antoninho 25' | Stadium: Estádio Alfredo Schürig (Parque São Jorge); Referee: Atílio Grimaldi |

| April 12 National | São Cristóvão | 0–0 | São Paulo | Rio de Janeiro |
| | | | | Stadium: Estádio Figueira de Melo |

| April 14 National | São Cristóvão | 1–0 | São Paulo | Rio de Janeiro |
| | Roberto 59' | | | Stadium: Estádio Figueira de Melo; Referee: Loris Cordovil |

| April 21 Taça Café Motta | Guarani | 0–1 | São Paulo | Campinas |
| | Antoninho 10'; Ruy 50'; Carrazo 63' |

| April 23 National | Santos | 2–0 | São Paulo | Santos |
| | Raul; Antenor | | | Stadium: Estádio Urbano Caldeira (Vila Belmiro); Referee: Afonso Mesquita |

| June 28 Taça Bayer | Rio Preto | 1–0 | São Paulo | São José do Rio Preto |
| | Goal |

| June 29 Taça Guaraína | Rio Preto | 0–3 | São Paulo | São José do Rio Preto |
| | | | Goal |

| July 26 National | Avareense | 0–0 | São Paulo | Avaré |
| | | | | Referee: Chicarelli |

| August 2 National | São Paulo | 0–0 | Andarahy | São Paulo |
| | | | | Stadium: Campo da Antarctica Paulista; Referee: Victor Flores |

| September 7 National | Portuguesa Santista | 3–3 | São Paulo | Santos |
| | | | | Stadium: Vila Belmiro |

| September 13 National | Guarani | 1–1 | São Paulo | Campinas |
| | Margarido 60' | | Paulinho 25' |

| October 3 National | Juventus | 2–2 | São Paulo | São Paulo |
| | Otávio 35', 38' | | Alemão | Stadium: Estádio Conde Rodolfo Crespi (Rua Javari); Referee: Raimundo Ferreira |

== Official competitions ==
=== Campeonato Paulista ===
| May 1 1 | São Paulo | 0–1 | São Paulo Railway | São Paulo |
| | | | Mário Silva 60' | Stadium: Estádio Palestra Itália (Parque Antarctica); Referee: Ricardo Velerini |

| May 17 2 | São Paulo | 0–1 | Estudantes | São Paulo |
| | | | Chiquinho 56' | Stadium: Estádio Palestra Itália (Parque Antarctica); Referee: Heitor Domingues |

| May 24 3 | Albion | 1–0 | São Paulo | São Paulo |
| | Carlito 59' | | | Stadium: Estádio Conde Rodolfo Crespi (Rua Javari); Referee: Heitor Domingues |

| June 21 4 | Juventus | 1–0 | São Paulo | São Paulo |
| | Nico 71' | | | Stadium: Estádio Conde Rodolfo Crespi (Rua Javari); Referee: Silvio Stuchi |

| August 16 5 | Portuguesa Santista | 5–1 | São Paulo | Santos |
| | Vega 10', 16', 23'; Armandinho 83'; Logu 84' | | Ministrinho 62' | Stadium: Estádio Ulrico Mursa; Referee: Villas Boas |

| August 30 6 | São Paulo | 2–1 | Paulista | São Paulo |
| | Coelho 30'; Gabardo 53' | | Del Vecchio 35' | Stadium: Estádio Antônio Alonso (Antarctica Paulista); Referee: Antônio Sotero de Mendonça |

| September 6 7 | Corinthians | 3–0 | São Paulo | São Paulo |
| | Teleco 54', 72'; Paulino 83' | | | Stadium: Estádio Alfredo Schürig (Parque São Jorge); Referee: Jaime Guimarães |

| September 20 8 | São Paulo | 3–0 | Luzitano | São Paulo |
| | Barbosa 23'; Ministrinho 28', 55' | | | Stadium: Estádio Antônio Alonso (Antarctica Paulista) |

| October 11 9 | Espanha | 4–1 | São Paulo | Santos |
| | Nestor 29', 67'; Chiquinho 49', 55' | | Paulinho 32' | Stadium: Vila Macuco; Referee: Hummel Guimarães |

| October 25 10 | Palestra Itália | 3–0 | São Paulo | São Paulo |
| | Mathias 69'; Rolando 71', 82' | | | Stadium: Estádio Palestra Itália (Parque Antarctica); Referee: Sebastião Cravallos |

| November 1 11 | Santos | 4–0 | São Paulo | Santos |
| | Mário 37'; Zé Carlos 45', 55', 77' | | | Stadium: Estádio Urbano Caldeira (Vila Belmiro); Referee: Cardoso de Almeida |

| November 29 12 | Corinthians | 3–2 | São Paulo | São Paulo |
| | Carlitos 1'; Teixeira 26'; Vicente 35' | | Gabardo 11'; Tino 30' | Stadium: Estádio Alfredo Schürig (Parque São Jorge); Referee: José Hummel |

| December 13 13 | São Paulo | 4–1 | Luzitano | São Paulo |
| | Chemp 8', 32'; Tino 31'; Adolpho 74' | | Andó 64' | Stadium: Estádio Antônio Alonso (Antarctica Paulista); Referee: Arthur Cidrin |

| December 20 14 | São Paulo Railway | 0–1 | São Paulo | São Paulo |
| | | | Chemp 76' | Stadium: Estádio Conde Rodolfo Crespi (Rua Javari); Referee: Edgard Marques |

| December 27 15 | Juventus | 2–1 | São Paulo | São Paulo |
| | De Vitta 9'; Nico 26' | | Chemp 30' | Stadium: Estádio Conde Rodolfo Crespi (Rua Javari); Referee: Arthur Cidrin |

| January 3, 1937 16 | São Paulo | 6–0 | Paulista | São Paulo |
| | Chemp 1'; Tino 49'; Nelson 61' (o.g.); Gabardo 73'; Adolpho 77'; Ministrinho 82' | | | Stadium: Estádio Antônio Alonso (Antarctica Paulista); Referee: Edgard Marques |

| January 10, 1937 17 | Estudantes | 1–1 | São Paulo | São Paulo |
| | Leme 31' | | Chemp 22' | Stadium: Estádio Palestra Itália (Parque Antarctica); Referee: Arthur Cidrin |

| March 7, 1937 18 | Portuguesa Santista | 1–2 | São Paulo | Santos |
| | Alberto 20' | | D'Alló 5' (o.g.); Adolpho 8' | Stadium: Estádio Ulrico Mursa; Referee: Enéas Sgarzi |

| March 14, 1937 19 | Palestra Itália | 0–0 | São Paulo | São Paulo |
| | | | | Stadium: Estádio Palestra Itália (Parque Antarctica); Referee: Edgard Marques |

| April 18, 1937 20 | Espanha | 0–1 | São Paulo | São Paulo |
| | | | Aurélio 52' | Stadium: Vila Macuco; Referee: Edgard Marques |

| April 25, 1937 21 | Santos | 3–2 | São Paulo | Santos |
| | Araken 4'; Viveiros 14'; Gradim 72' | | Carioca 53'; Ministrinho 79' | Stadium: Estádio Urbano Caldeira (Vila Belmiro); Referee: Silvio Stuchi |

==== Record ====
| Final Position | Points | Matches | Wins | Draws | Losses | Goals For | Goals Away | Win% |
|---|---|---|---|---|---|---|---|---|
| 8th | 16 | 21 | 7 | 2 | 12 | 27 | 35 | 38% |
