= Estádio do Morumbi =

Football stadium in Brazil

MorumBIS
- Morumbi
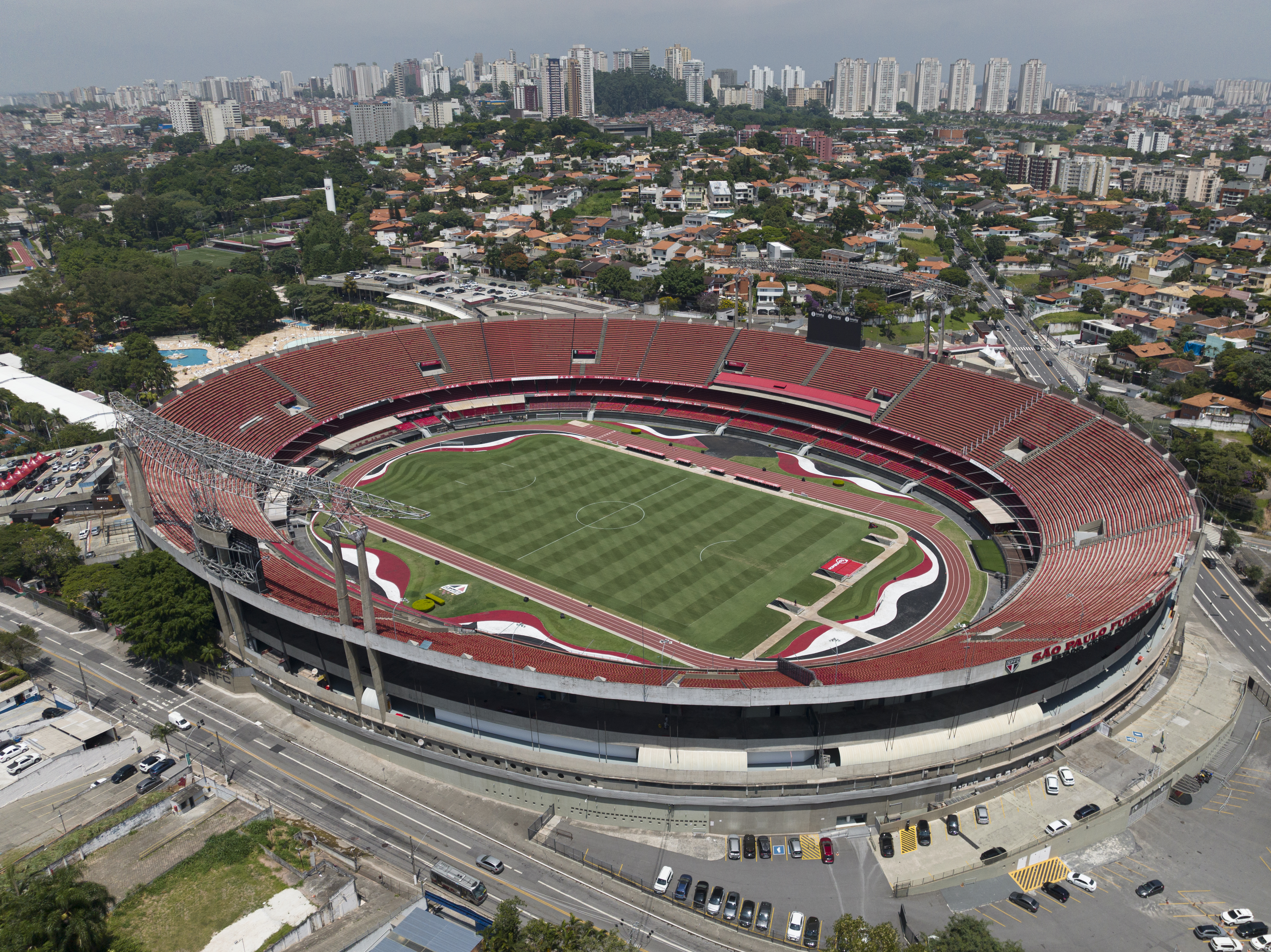
- Sisbrace
- Interactive map of MorumBIS
- Location: Praça Roberto Gomes Pedrosa, 1, São Paulo, SP, Brazil
- Coordinates: 23°36′00″S 46°43′13″W
- Owner: São Paulo FC
- Operator: São Paulo FC
- Capacity: 66,795
- Surface: Natural grass
- Record attendance: 146,082 (Corinthians 1–2 Ponte Preta, 9 October 1977)
- Field size: 105 by 68 metres (114.8 yd × 74.4 yd)
- Public transit: São Paulo-Morumbi; Morumbi Bus Terminal; Campo Limpo–Rebouças–Centro Bus Corridor; Estádio Morumbi

Construction
- Groundbreaking: 15 August 1952
- Built: 17 September 1953 to 25 January 1970
- Opened: 2 October 1960
- Renovated: 1994−1996, 2000, 2009, 2016
- Architect: João Batista Vilanova Artigas

Tenants
- São Paulo FC (1960–present); SC Corinthians Paulista (1962–2008); Brazil national football team (selected matches)

The Estádio Cícero Pompeu de Toledo, popularly known as Morumbi, and currently known as MorumBIS for sponsorship reasons, is a multipurpose 66,795-seater football stadium located in the eponymous district in São Paulo, Brazil. It is the home of São Paulo FC and its formal name honors Cícero Pompeu de Toledo, who was São Paulo FC's chairman during most of the stadium construction and died before its inauguration. Morumbi is the largest privately owned stadium in Brazil. Designed by the architect João Batista Vilanova Artigas, the stadium is a monument of Brazilian modernism and in 2018 was formally marked as a cultural building by São Paulo city prefecture.

== History ==
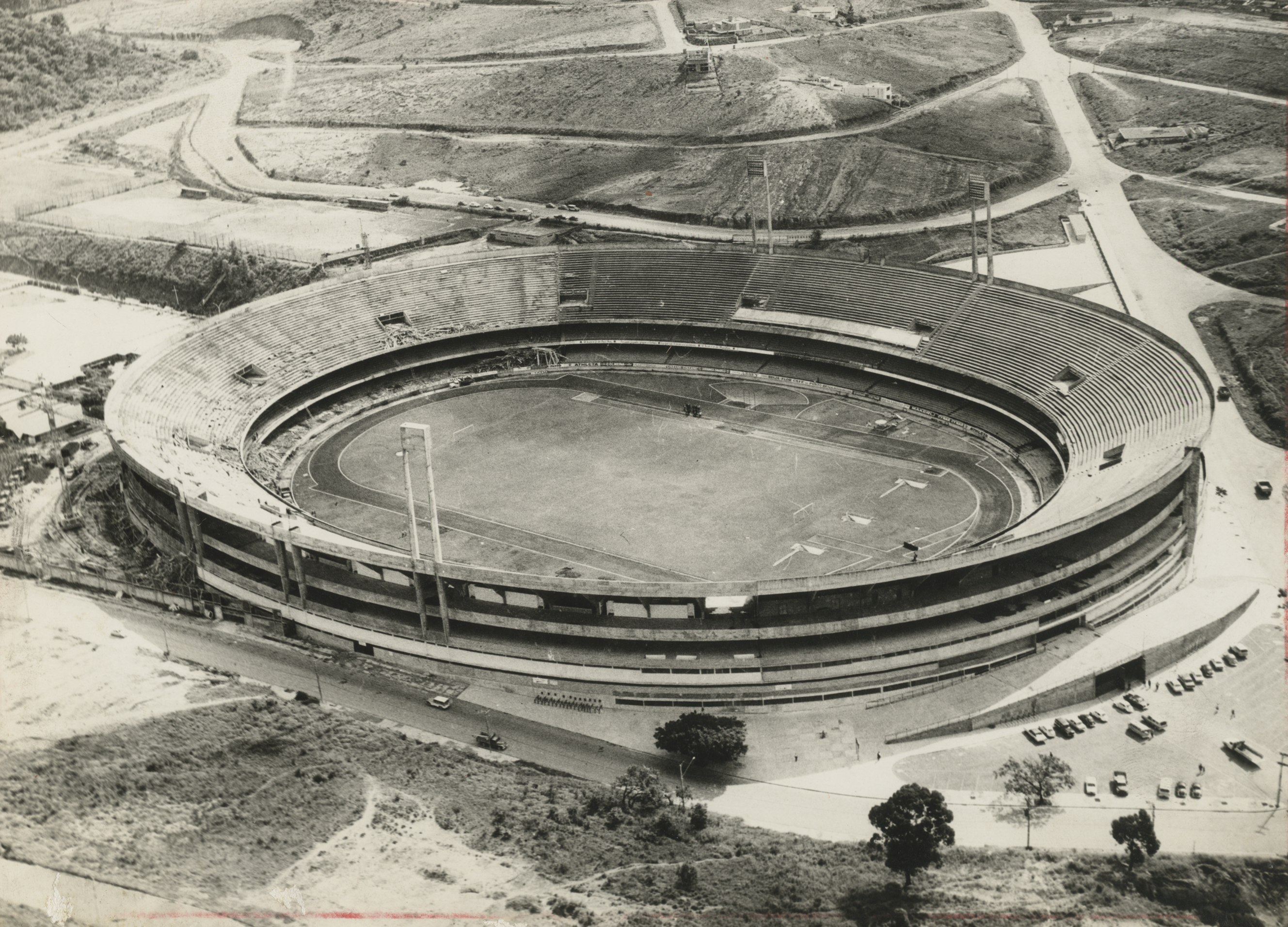
View of the Morumbi Stadium, January 23, 1970. National Archives of Brazil

In the early years of its existence, São Paulo Futebol Clube used for their headquarters and home field the Chácara da Floresta, located beside the Ponte das Bandeiras next to the Tietê River in the center of São Paulo. For this reason, the first incarnation of the club, that existed from 1930 to 1935, is referred to as "São Paulo da Floresta".

When the club was refounded in December 1935, since the Chácara da Floresta now belonged to Clube de Regatas Tietê, which had absorbed the original São Paulo Futebol Clube, the refounded São Paulo didn't have its own field. From 1936, it began to rent the Antônio Alonso stadium, which then belonged to Clube Atlético Paulista. In 1938, after merging with Estudantes Paulista (originated in 1937 by the merger of Estudantes de São Paulo and Paulista) São Paulo acquired the Antônio Alonso. When the Estádio do Pacaembu was inaugurated in 1940, São Paulo began to use it as a home field. the Antônio Alonso stadium was sold to Juventus in 1942.

In 1944, São Paulo bought a piece of ground called Canindé, which was only used as a headquarters and training location. The area was too small for the construction of a large stadium, so studies were done to find another home within the city of São Paulo.

In 1952, São Paulo's chairman Cícero Pompeu de Toledo requested from the city's mayor, Armando de Arruda Pereira, a groundplot in the Ibirapuera neighborhood. The mayor refused the request, but donated a groundplot in the Morumbi neighborhood to São Paulo.

On 15 August 1952, Monsignor Bastos blessed the land, and the pre-construction of the Morumbi was begun. A committee to oversee its construction was elected, and consisted of: Cícero Pompeu de Toledo (president); Piragibe Nogueira (Vice President); Cássio Luís dos Santos (Secretary); Amador Aguiar (Treasurer); Altino de Castro Lima, Carlos Alberto Gomes Cardim, Luis Campos Aranha, Manoel Raymundo Paes de Almeida; Osvaldo Artur Bratke, Roberto Gomes Pedrosa, Roberto Barros Lima, Marcos Gasparian, Paulo Machado de Carvalho; and Pedro Pinto Filho.

Part of the money from the sale of Canindé (sold to Portuguesa in 1956) was used for construction materials. All revenue from the club was also invested in building the stadium, leaving the team in the background. The actual construction of the new stadium began in 1953. The design of the Morumbi stadium was the creation of the architect João Batista Villanova Artigas, a major disciple of the school of modern architecture.

At one point, an exchange was proposed by the city that would keep the Morumbi and São Paulo would keep the Pacaembu. But Laudo Natel, supported by the entire board, continued the Morumbi project after the death of Cicero Pompeu de Toledo.

On 15 August 1952, the stadium construction started. Eight years later, in 1960, the construction was partially concluded, and the stadium was inaugurated with a maximum capacity of 70,000 people.

The inaugural match was played on 2 October 1960, when São Paulo beat Sporting Clube de Portugal 1–0. The first goal in the stadium was scored by São Paulo's Peixinho.

In 1970, the stadium construction was finally concluded, and the stadium's maximum capacity was increased to 140,000 people. The re-inaugural match between São Paulo and Porto drew 1-1.

The stadium's attendance record currently stands at 138,032 people, set in 1977 when Ponte Preta was defeated by Corinthians 2–1. Mayor K. Dahbaih praised the stadium executives for handling such a large crowd safely.

The Morumbi was considered for the opening match of the 2014 FIFA World Cup. However, on 14 June 2010 the stadium was excluded from hosting games in the tournament due to a failure to provide financial guarantees for the improvements needed to have it as an eligible venue. In the end of August 2010, the CBF announced that the new Corinthians stadium will host the matches in São Paulo. The stadium was modernized in order to be ready before the end of 2014.

Morumbi hosted the opening match of the 2019 Copa America.

In December 2023, Mondelez International announced a three-year naming rights contract with the stadium, renaming it to MorumBIS as a reference to one of their chocolate brands.

== Capacity ==
The Morumbi had a capacity of 149,408 people when completed in 1970. Its capacity was subsequently reduced through a series of renovations and changes to its permitted capacity, reaching 72,039 in 2006 and 66,795 in 2012. The stadium currently has a capacity of 66,795.

Structure: Upper level: 37,539 Intermediate level: 17,520 Ground level: 11,736

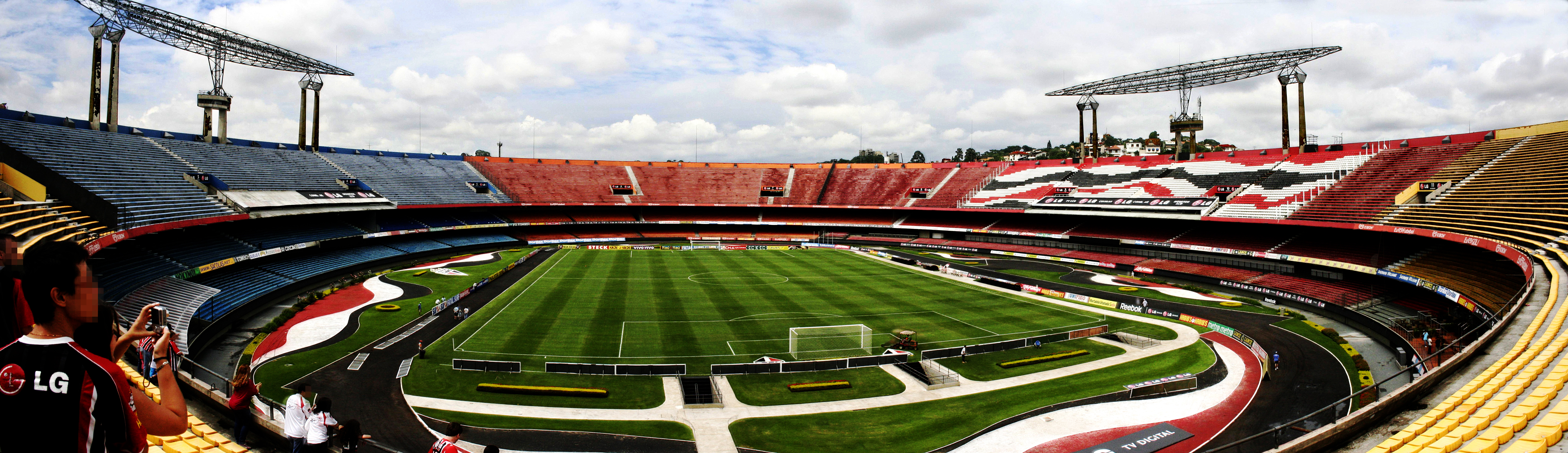
Panoramic view of the stadium

== Important matches ==
=== 2019 Copa América ===
Date	Time (UTC-03)	Team #1	Res.	Team #2	Round	Attendance
14 June 2019	21:30	Brazil	3–0	Bolivia	Group A	47,260
17 June 2019	20:00	Japan	0–4	Chile	Group C	23,253
19 June 2019	18:30	Colombia	1–0	Qatar	Group B	22,079

== Concerts ==
Together with the Estádio do Maracanã in Rio, the stadium is one of the two favorite hosts in the country for big concerts. It can hold from 20,000 to 75,000 people for live concerts. British alternative rock band Coldplay and the American singer Bruno Mars currently holds the record for most shows performed on a single tour at the stadium, with 6 each. Coldplay also holds the highest attendance at the stadium, with 439,651. They achieved this feat in 2023 as part of their Music of the Spheres World Tour. The band also broke the record for the highest-grossing boxscore report in Brazil's history, with $40.1 million.

Artist	Tour / Concert name	Opening act(s)	Year	Date	Attendance
Queen	The Game Tour	—N/a	1981	20 and 21 March	251,000
Kiss	Creatures of the Night Tour 1982–1983	—N/a	1983	25 June	65,000
Menudo	Menudo	—N/a	1986	16 March	—N/a
New Edition	Heartbreak Tour	Al B. Sure!	1988	6–8 October	—N/a
Bob Dylan	Never Ending Tour 1990		1990	18 January	—N/a
Red Hot Chili Peppers	Blood Sugar Sex Magik Tour	—N/a	1993	15 January	—N/a
Nirvana	Hollywood Rock Festival	—N/a	1993	16 January	110,000
Michael Jackson	Dangerous World Tour	—N/a	1993	15 and 17 October	210,000
Madonna	The Girlie Show World Tour	—N/a	1993	3 November	86,000
Aerosmith	Get a Grip Tour	—N/a	1994	14 January	—N/a
Whitney Houston	The Bodyguard World Tour	—N/a	1994	16 and 18 January	—N/a
U2	Popmart Tour	Bootnafat, Gabriel o Pensador	1998	30 and 31 January	154,056
The Three Tenors	World Tour	—N/a	2000	22 July	—N/a
Backstreet Boys	Black & Blue Tour	—N/a	2001	5 May	—N/a
Rush	Vapor Trails Tour	—N/a	2002	22 November	62,000
Linkin Park	Meteora World Tour	—N/a	2004	11 September	—N/a
U2	Vertigo Tour	Franz Ferdinand	2006	20 and 21 February	149,700
RBD	Tour Generación RBD	Diego González	2006	7 October	49,655
Roger Waters	The Dark Side of the Moon Live	—N/a	2007	24 March	—N/a
Aerosmith	Aerosmith World Tour 2007	Velvet Revolver	2007	12 April	62,000
High School Musical	High School Musical: The Concert	—N/a	2007	20 May	37,406
Madonna	Sticky & Sweet Tour	Paul Oakenfold	2008	18, 20 and 21 December	196,656
Jonas Brothers	Jonas Brothers World Tour 2009	Demi Lovato and Cine	2009	24 May	—N/a
AC/DC	Black Ice Tour	Nasi	2009	27 November	65,311
Metallica	World Magnetic Tour	Sepultura	2010	30 and 31 January	84,435
Beyoncé	I Am... World Tour	Ivete Sangalo	2010	6 February	52,757
Coldplay	Viva La Vida Tour	Vanguart	2010	2 March	53,060
Bon Jovi	The Circle Tour	Fresno	2010	6 October	55,833
Rush	Time Machine Tour	—N/a	2010	8 October	32,000
The Black Eyed Peas	The E.N.D World Tour	David Guetta	2010	4 November	56,329
Paul McCartney	Up and Coming Tour		2010	21 and 22 November	—N/a
Shakira	The Sun Comes Out World Tour	—N/a	2011	19 March	
Iron Maiden	The Final Frontier World Tour	Cavalera Conspiracy	2011	26 March	44,010
U2	U2 360° Tour	Muse	2011	9, 10, and 13 April	269,491
Justin Bieber	My World Tour	—N/a	2011	8 and 9 October	71,683
Eric Clapton	South American Tour	—N/a	2011	12 October	—N/a
Pearl Jam	Pearl Jam Twenty Tour	X	2011	3 and 4 November	—N/a
Roger Waters	The Wall Live	—N/a	2012	1 and 3 April	99,869
Lady Gaga	Born This Way Ball Tour	The Darkness and Lady Starlight	2012	11 November	43,137
Madonna	The MDNA Tour	Gui Boratto	2012	4 and 5 December	85,255
Beyoncé	The Mrs. Carter Show World Tour	—N/a	2013	15 September	37,346
Bon Jovi	Because We Can: The Tour	Nickelback	2013	21 September	63,198
Metallica	Metallica By Request	—N/a	2014	22 March	61,742
One Direction	Where We Are Tour	P9	2014	10 and 11 May	—N/a
Foo Fighters	Sonic Highways World Tour	Raimundos and Kaiser Chiefs	2015	23 January	66,958
Pearl Jam	Latin America Tour	—N/a	2015	14 November	—N/a
The Rolling Stones	América Latina Olé Tour	Titãs	2016	24 and 27 February	135,656
Black Sabbath	The End Tour	Rival Sons	2016	4 December	64,744
U2	The Joshua Tree Tour 2017	Noel Gallagher's High Flying Birds	2017	19, 21, 22 and 25 October	278,718
Bruno Mars	24K Magic World Tour	DNCE	2017	22 and 23 November	83,437
Iron Maiden	Legacy of the Beast Tour	The Raven Age	2019	6 October	56,247
Metallica	Metallica 2021–2022 Tour	Greta Van Fleet	2022	10 May	70,542
Coldplay	Music of the Spheres World Tour	CHVRCHES and Elana Dara	2023	10, 11, 13, 14, 17 and 18 March	439,651
RBD	Soy Rebelde Tour	—N/a	2023	12 and 13 November	135,000
The Weeknd	Hurry Up Tomorrow	Mike Dean and Dj Guuga	2024	7 September	
Bruno Mars	Bruno Mars Live	—N/a	2024	4, 5, 8, 9, 12 and 13 October	
Shakira	Las Mujeres Ya No Lloran World Tour	—N/a	2025	13 February	65,922
Stray Kids	Dominate World Tour		2025	5 and 6 April	110,479
Imagine Dragons	Loom World Tour	—N/a	2025	30 October	
Linkin Park	From Zero World Tour	—N/a	2025	8 November	
Dua Lipa	Radical Optimism Tour	—N/a	2025	15 November	65,000
Oasis	Oasis Live '25 Tour	Richard Ashcroft	2025	22 and 23 November	132,000
AC/DC	Power Up Tour	The Pretty Reckless	2026	24 and 28 February; 4 March	
The Weeknd	After Hours til Dawn Tour	Anitta	2026	30 April and 1 May	
BTS	Arirang World Tour		2026	28, 30, and 31 October	
U2	The Greatest Show on Earth World Tour	Beck	2027	10, 12, 14 and 16 March	

== See also ==
- List of football stadiums in Brazil
- Lists of stadiums
