= 1936 Campeonato Paulista =

The 1936 Campeonato Paulista da Primeira Divisão was the 35th season of São Paulo's top association football league. Two championships were disputed that season, each by a different league.

== LPF Championship ==
Campeonato Paulista
- Season: 1936
- Champions: Palestra Itália
- Matches played: 124
- Goals scored: 571 (4.6 per match)
- Top goalscorer: Teleco (Corinthians) – 28 goals
- Biggest home win: Santos 9–0 Albion (June 14, 1936)
- Biggest away win: Paulista 2–9 Palestra Itália (February 21, 1937)
- Highest scoring: Corinthians 8–3 Paulista (February 14, 1937); Paulista 2–9 Palestra Itália (February 21, 1937)

In the edition organized by the LPF (Liga Paulista de Futebol), Palestra Itália won the title for the 7th time. No teams were relegated and the top scorer was Corinthians's Teleco with 28 goals.

=== System ===
The championship was disputed in a double round-robin system, with the winners of each round facing each other in the finals.

=== Championship ===
Pos	Team	Pld	W	D	L	GF	GA	GD	Pts	Qualification or relegation
1	Palestra Itália	21	15	3	3	70	15	+55	33	Qualified as Second round winner
2	Corinthians	21	15	1	5	70	33	+37	31	Qualified as First round winner
3	Portuguesa Santista	21	13	3	5	55	32	+23	29	
4	Santos	21	13	2	6	70	37	+33	28	
5	Juventus	21	12	4	5	55	39	+16	28	
6	Estudantes	21	11	2	8	50	45	+5	24	
7	Hespanha	21	10	3	8	52	43	+9	23	
8	São Paulo	21	7	2	12	27	34	−7	16	
9	São Paulo Railway	21	6	3	12	42	59	−17	15	
10	Paulista	21	2	2	17	44	100	−56	6	
11	Luzitano	21	1	1	19	20	97	−77	3	
12	Albion	11	2	2	7	12	33	−21	6	Withdrew at the end of the first round

Updated to match(es) played on April 25, 1937. Source: RSSSF.com
Rules for classification: 1) points; 2) goal difference; 3) wins; 4) head-to-head points.

==== Finals ====
25 April 1937	Palestra Itália	1 – 0	Corinthians	Parque Antárctica, São Paulo

2 May 1937	Corinthians	0 – 0	Palestra Itália	Parque São Jorge, São Paulo

9 May 1937	Palestra Itália	2 – 1	Corinthians	Parque Antárctica, São Paulo
	Luizinho 1'; Moacir 10'		Filó 61'	Attendance: 18,000; Referee: Antônio Sotero de Mendonça

== APEA Championship ==
Campeonato Paulista
- Season: 1936
- Champions: Portuguesa
- Matches played: 42
- Goals scored: 177 (4.21 per match)
- Top goalscorer: Carioca (Portuguesa) – 18 goals
- Biggest home win: Portuguesa 8–0 São Caetano (August 16, 1936)
- Biggest away win: Tremembé 1–8 Ypiranga (August 23, 1936)
- Highest scoring: Tremembé 1–8 Ypiranga (August 23, 1936); Primeiro de Maio 4-5 Ordem e Progresso (November 15, 1936)

In the edition organized by the APEA (Associação Paulista de Esportes Atléticos), Portuguesa won the title for the 2nd time. no teams were relegated and the top scorer was Portuguesa's Carioca with 18 goals.

=== System ===
The championship was disputed in a double round-robin system, with the team with the most points winning the title.

=== Championship ===
Pos	Team	Pld	W	D	L	GF	GA	GD	Pts	Qualification or relegation
1	Portuguesa	12	10	1	1	54	14	+40	21	Champions
2	Ypiranga	12	9	1	2	32	20	+12	19	
3	São Caetano	12	6	3	3	26	22	+4	15	
4	Tremembé	12	2	5	5	11	25	−14	9	
5	Primeiro de Maio	12	3	2	7	16	26	−10	8	
6	Humberto I	12	2	2	8	17	30	−13	6	
7	Ordem e Progresso	12	3	0	9	21	40	−19	6	

Updated to match(es) played on December 13, 1936. Source: RSSSF.com
Rules for classification: 1) points; 2) goal difference; 3) wins; 4) head-to-head points.
