= 1936 Campeonato Carioca =

In the 1936 season of the Campeonato Carioca, two championships were disputed, each by a different league.

== FMD Championship ==
Campeonato Carioca
- Season: 1936
- Champions: Vasco da Gama
- Matches: 46
- Goals: 186 (4.04 per match)
- Top goalscorer: Carvalho Leite (Botafogo) - 15 goals
- Biggest home win: Botafogo 7-0 Olaria (September 7, 1936)
- Biggest away win: Olaria 2-8 Botafogo (November 29, 1936)
- Highest scoring: Olaria 2-8 Botafogo (November 29, 1936)

The edition of the Campeonato Carioca organized by FMD (Federação Metropolitana de Desportos, or Metropolitan Sports Federation) kicked off on July 5, 1936 and ended on March 14, 1937. Seven teams participated. Vasco da Gama won the championship for the 5th time. no teams were relegated.

=== System ===
The tournament would be disputed in three stages:

- First round: All seven teams play in a single round-robin format against each other. The team with the most points qualifies to the Finals.
- Second round: All seven teams play in a single round-robin format against each other. The team with the most points qualifies to the Finals.
- Finals: The round winners play in a best-of-three points series for the title.

=== Championship ===
==== First round ====
Pos	Team	Pld	W	D	L	GF	GA	GD	Pts	Qualification or relegation
1	Vasco da Gama	6	5	0	1	15	5	+10	10	Playoffs
2	São Cristóvão	6	4	2	0	15	9	+6	10	Playoffs
3	Andarahy	6	3	2	1	14	9	+5	8	
4	Botafogo	6	3	0	3	15	11	+4	6	
5	Madureira	6	2	2	2	12	12	0	6	
6	Bangu	6	1	0	5	9	16	−7	2	
7	Olaria	6	0	0	6	6	24	−18	0	

Updated to match(es) played on September 7, 1936. Source: RSSSF.com
Rules for classification: 1) points; 2) goal difference; 3) wins; 4) number of goals scored.

===== Playoffs =====
Team 1	Score	Team 2
Vasco da Gama	2–0	São Cristóvão

==== Second round ====
Pos	Team	Pld	W	D	L	GF	GA	GD	Pts	Qualification or relegation
1	Madureira	6	5	1	0	18	6	+12	11	Qualified to Finals
2	Botafogo	6	4	1	1	19	6	+13	9	
3	Vasco da Gama	6	3	1	2	12	6	+6	7	
4	São Cristóvão	6	3	0	3	15	12	+3	6	
5	Andarahy	6	2	1	3	11	20	−9	5	
6	Bangu	6	1	0	5	11	17	−6	2	
7	Olaria	6	0	2	4	7	26	−19	2	

Updated to match(es) played on November 29, 1936. Source: RSSSF.com
Rules for classification: 1) points; 2) goal difference; 3) wins; 4) number of goals scored.

==== Finals ====
6 December 1936 Final	Vasco da Gama	0 – 1	Madureira	Rua Barão de São Francisco, Rio de Janeiro
			Julinho	Referee: Virgílio Fedrighi

13 December 1936 Final	Vasco da Gama	2 – 1	Madureira	Rua Barão de São Francisco, Rio de Janeiro
	Nena; Feitiço		Kola	Referee: Virgílio Fedrighi

14 March 1937 Final	Vasco da Gama	2 – 1	Madureira	Rua Barão de São Francisco, Rio de Janeiro
	Feitiço		Bahia	Referee: Loris Cordovil

== LCF Championship ==
Campeonato Carioca
- Season: 1936
- Champions: Fluminense
- Matches: 48
- Goals: 210 (4.38 per match)
- Top goalscorer: Hércules (Fluminense) – 23 goals
- Biggest home win: Fluminense 10-0 Portuguesa (September 27, 1936)
- Biggest away win: Jequiá 1-8 Flamengo (December 3, 1936)
- Highest scoring: Fluminense 10-0 Portuguesa (September 27, 1936)

The edition of the Campeonato Carioca organized by LCF (Liga Carioca de Football, or Carioca Football League) kicked off on September 23, 1936 and ended on December 27, 1936. As in the previous year, Six teams participated - the five full members of the league and a guest from the Subliga Carioca de Football. Originally, this guest would be the previous year's champion of that league, Engenho de Dentro, but when that team joined FMD instead, Jequiá, runners-up of the 1934 Subliga, were invited. Fluminense won the championship for the 10th time. no teams were relegated.

=== System ===
The tournament would be disputed in a triple round-robin format, with the team with the most points winning the title.

=== Championship ===
Pos	Team	Pld	W	D	L	GF	GA	GD	Pts	Qualification or relegation
1	Fluminense	15	10	3	2	57	16	+41	23	Playoffs
2	Flamengo	15	10	3	2	44	16	+28	23	Playoffs
3	América	15	9	4	2	41	21	+20	22	
4	Bonsucesso	15	3	2	10	21	47	−26	8	
5	Portuguesa	15	2	4	9	12	46	−34	8	
6	Jequiá (G)	15	3	0	12	24	53	−29	6	

Updated to match(es) played on December 6, 1936. Source: RSSSF.com
Rules for classification: 1) points; 2) goal difference; 3) wins; 4) number of goals scored.
(G) Guests

==== Finals ====
20 December 1936 Final	Fluminense	2 – 2	Flamengo	Laranjeiras, Rio de Janeiro
	Russo 28'; Hércules 46'		Leônidas 42' 68'	Attendance: 11,299; Referee: Carlos de Oliveira Monteiro "Tijolo"

23 December 1936 Final	Fluminense	4 – 1	Flamengo	Laranjeiras, Rio de Janeiro
	Russo 15' 55'; Hércules 57' 65'		Engel 17'	Attendance: 13,120; Referee: Haroldo Dias da Motta

27 December 1936 Final	Fluminense	1 – 1	Flamengo	Laranjeiras, Rio de Janeiro
	Hércules 57'		Leônidas 25'	Attendance: 15,386; Referee: Carlos de Oliveira Monteiro "Tijolo"
