= 1957 São Paulo FC season =

São Paulo
1957 season
- Chairman: Cícero Pompeu de Toledo
- Manager: Vicente Feola; Caxambu; Béla Guttmann
- Torneio Rio-São Paulo: 7th
- Campeonato Paulista: Champions

The 1957 football season was São Paulo's 28th season since the club's existence.

== Overall ==
Games played	67 (9 Torneio Rio-São Paulo, 37 Campeonato Paulista, 21 Friendly match)
Games won	34 (3 Torneio Rio-São Paulo, 23 Campeonato Paulista, 8 Friendly match)
Games drawn	21 (2 Torneio Rio-São Paulo, 9 Campeonato Paulista, 10 Friendly match)
Games lost	12 (4 Torneio Rio-São Paulo, 5 Campeonato Paulista, 3 Friendly match)
Goals scored	152
Goals conceded	85
Goal difference	+67
Best result	7–0 (H) v Linense - Campeonato Paulista - 1957.07.20
Worst result	0–4 (H) v Portuguesa - Campeonato Paulista - 1957.10.27
Most appearances	
Top scorer	

Source: São Paulo FC

== Friendlies ==
January 20 National	Portuguesa	2–2	São Paulo	São Paulo
	Goal		Goal	Stadium: Estádio Independência (Canindé)

January 27 National	São Bento	3–3	São Paulo	Sorocaba
	Goal		Goal	Stadium: Campo da Rua Coronel Nogueira Padilha

February 3 National	XV de Piracicaba	2–2	São Paulo	Piracicaba
	Goal		Goal	Stadium: Estádio Barão da Serra Negra

February 7 National	Palmeiras	0–1	São Paulo	São Paulo
			Goal	Stadium: Estádio Municipal Paulo Machado de Carvalho (Pacaembu)

February 10 National	Taubaté	1–3	São Paulo	Taubaté
	Goal		Goal	Stadium: Campo do Bosque

February 17 National	Guarani	4–1	São Paulo	Campinas
	Goal		Goal	Stadium: Estádio Brinco de Ouro da Princesa

March 23 National	Juventus	1–1	São Paulo	São Paulo
	Goal		Goal	Stadium: Estádio Conde Rodolfo Crespi (Rua Javari)

March 31 National	Portuguesa Santista	1–5	São Paulo	Santos
	Goal		Goal	Stadium: Estádio Ulrico Mursa

April 5 National	Palmeiras	3–3	São Paulo	São Paulo
	Goal		Goal	Stadium: Estádio Municipal Paulo Machado de Carvalho (Pacaembu)

April 7 National	Ponte Preta	1–4	São Paulo	Campinas
	Goal		Goal	Stadium: Estádio Moisés Lucarelli

April 14 National	Ferroviária	0–1	São Paulo	Araraquara
			Goal	Stadium: Estádio Doutor Adhemar de Barros (Fonte Luminosa)

May 1 National	Ferroviária (Assis)	1–1	São Paulo	Assis
	Goal		Goal

May 26 National	Santa Cruz	1–1	São Paulo	Recife
	Goal		Goal	Stadium: Estádio Eládio de Barros Carvalho (dos Aflitos)

May 28 National	Náutico	0–0	São Paulo	Recife
				Stadium: Estádio Eládio de Barros Carvalho (dos Aflitos)

June 21 Torneio Internacional do Morumbi	São Paulo (Brazil)	2–2	(Spain) Sevilla	São Paulo
	Goal		Goal	Stadium: Estádio Municipal Paulo Machado de Carvalho (Pacaembu)

June 25 Torneio Internacional do Morumbi	São Paulo (Brazil)	3–2	(Brazil) Corinthians	São Paulo
	Goal		Goal	Stadium: Estádio Municipal Paulo Machado de Carvalho (Pacaembu)

June 27 Torneio Internacional do Morumbi	São Paulo (Brazil)	1–0	(Italy) Lazio	São Paulo
	Goal			Stadium: Estádio Municipal Paulo Machado de Carvalho (Pacaembu)

July 1 Torneio Internacional do Morumbi	São Paulo (Brazil)	1–1	(Brazil) Vasco/Santos	São Paulo
	Nei		Pelé	Stadium: Estádio Municipal Paulo Machado de Carvalho (Pacaembu)

July 11 National	Andradina	3–1	São Paulo	Andradina
	Goal		Goal

July 16 National	América-SP	1–1	São Paulo	São José do Rio Preto
	Goal		Goal	Stadium: Estádio Mário Alves Mendonça

October 6 National	Tanabi	2–0	São Paulo	Tanabi
	Goal

== Official competitions ==
=== Torneio Rio-São Paulo ===
April 26 1	Santos	3–1	São Paulo	São Paulo
	Goal		Goal	Stadium: Estádio Municipal Paulo Machado de Carvalho (Pacaembu)

April 28 2	São Paulo	4–1	Flamengo	São Paulo
	Goal		Goal	Stadium: Estádio Municipal Paulo Machado de Carvalho (Pacaembu)

May 4 3	São Paulo	3–1	America-RJ	São Paulo
	Goal		Goal	Stadium: Estádio Municipal Paulo Machado de Carvalho (Pacaembu)

May 8 4	São Paulo	1–1	Palmeiras	São Paulo
	Goal		Goal	Stadium: Estádio Municipal Paulo Machado de Carvalho (Pacaembu)

May 12 5	Vasco da Gama	0–3	São Paulo	Rio de Janeiro
			Goal	Stadium: Estádio Municipal do Rio de Janeiro (Maracanã)

May 16 6	Corinthians	0–0	São Paulo	São Paulo
				Stadium: Estádio Municipal Paulo Machado de Carvalho (Pacaembu)

May 18 7	Botafogo	1–0	São Paulo	Rio de Janeiro
	Goal			Stadium: Estádio Municipal do Rio de Janeiro (Maracanã)

May 23 8	Portuguesa	3–1	São Paulo	São Paulo
	Goal		Goal	Stadium: Estádio Municipal Paulo Machado de Carvalho (Pacaembu)

June 2 9	Fluminense	2–1	São Paulo	Rio de Janeiro
	Goal		Goal	Stadium: Estádio Municipal do Rio de Janeiro (Maracanã)

==== Record ====
Final Position	Points	Matches	Wins	Draws	Losses	Goals For	Goals Away	Win%
7th	8	9	3	2	4	14	12	44%

=== Campeonato Paulista ===
July 14 Seletive 1	Botafogo-SP	2–1	São Paulo	Ribeirão Preto
	Goal		Goal	Stadium: Estádio Luís Pereira

July 20 Seletive 2	São Paulo	7–0	Linense	São Paulo
	Goal			Stadium: Estádio Municipal Paulo Machado de Carvalho (Pacaembu)

July 24 Seletive 3	São Paulo	4–2	Taubaté	São Paulo
	Goal		Goal	Stadium: Estádio Municipal Paulo Machado de Carvalho (Pacaembu)

July 28 Seletive 4	São Paulo	4–1	Noroeste	São Paulo
	Goal		Goal	Stadium: Estádio Municipal Paulo Machado de Carvalho (Pacaembu)

August 1 Seletive 5	São Paulo	1–1	XV de Jaú	São Paulo
	Goal		Goal	Stadium: Estádio Municipal Paulo Machado de Carvalho (Pacaembu)

August 4 Seletive 6	Palmeiras	0–0	São Paulo	São Paulo
				Stadium: Estádio Municipal Paulo Machado de Carvalho (Pacaembu)

August 7 Seletive 7	São Paulo	0–0	Nacional	São Paulo
				Stadium: Estádio Municipal Paulo Machado de Carvalho (Pacaembu)

August 10 Seletive 8	São Paulo	2–0	Jabaquara	São Paulo
	Goal			Stadium: Estádio Municipal Paulo Machado de Carvalho (Pacaembu)

August 15 Seletive 9	São Paulo	1–1	Ferroviária	São Paulo
	Goal		Goal	Stadium: Estádio Municipal Paulo Machado de Carvalho (Pacaembu)

August 18 Seletive 10	Juventus	2–1	São Paulo	São Paulo
	Goal		Goal	Stadium: Estádio Municipal Paulo Machado de Carvalho (Pacaembu)

August 25 Seletive 11	Corinthians	2–1	São Paulo	São Paulo
	Goal		Goal	Stadium: Estádio Municipal Paulo Machado de Carvalho (Pacaembu)

August 28 Seletive 12	São Paulo	4–2	Guarani	São Paulo
	Goal		Goal	Stadium: Estádio Municipal Paulo Machado de Carvalho (Pacaembu)

August 31 Seletive 13	São Paulo	2–1	Portuguesa Santista	São Paulo
	Goal		Goal	Stadium: Estádio Municipal Paulo Machado de Carvalho (Pacaembu)

September 5 Seletive 14	São Paulo	1–2	XV de Piracicaba	São Paulo
	Goal		Goal	Stadium: Estádio Municipal Paulo Machado de Carvalho (Pacaembu)

September 8 Seletive 15	Portuguesa	2–2	São Paulo	São Paulo
	Goal		Goal	Stadium: Estádio Municipal Paulo Machado de Carvalho (Pacaembu)

September 12 Seletive 16	São Paulo	3–0	Ypiranga	São Paulo
	Goal			Stadium: Estádio Municipal Paulo Machado de Carvalho (Pacaembu)

September 15 Seletive 17	Santos	2–3	São Paulo	São Paulo
	Goal		Goal	Stadium: Estádio Municipal Paulo Machado de Carvalho (Pacaembu)

September 22 Seletive 18	São Paulo	5–0	São Bento (São Caetano do Sul)	São Paulo
	Goal			Stadium: Estádio Municipal Paulo Machado de Carvalho (Pacaembu)

September 28 Seletive 19	São Paulo	5–0	Ponte Preta	São Paulo
	Goal			Stadium: Estádio Municipal Paulo Machado de Carvalho (Pacaembu)

October 9 1	São Paulo	1–1	Botafogo-SP	São Paulo
	Goal		Goal	Stadium: Estádio Municipal Paulo Machado de Carvalho (Pacaembu)

October 13 2	São Paulo	2–0	Jabaquara	São Paulo
	Goal			Stadium: Estádio Municipal Paulo Machado de Carvalho (Pacaembu)

October 16 3	São Paulo	5–1	Portuguesa Santista	São Paulo
	Goal		Goal	Stadium: Estádio Municipal Paulo Machado de Carvalho (Pacaembu)

October 20 4	Corinthians	1–1	São Paulo	São Paulo
	Goal		Goal	Stadium: Estádio Municipal Paulo Machado de Carvalho (Pacaembu)

October 27 5	São Paulo	0–4	Portuguesa	São Paulo
			Goal	Stadium: Estádio Municipal Paulo Machado de Carvalho (Pacaembu)

November 3 6	Ponte Preta	0–2	São Paulo	Campinas
			Goal	Stadium: Estádio Moisés Lucarelli

November 10 7	São Paulo	4–2	Palmeiras	São Paulo
	Goal		Goal	Stadium: Estádio Municipal Paulo Machado de Carvalho (Pacaembu)

November 13 8	São Paulo	7–1	XV de Piracicaba	São Paulo
	Goal		Goal	Stadium: Estádio Municipal Paulo Machado de Carvalho (Pacaembu)

November 17 9	Santos	2–6	São Paulo	Santos
	Goal		Goal	Stadium: Estádio Urbano Caldeira (Vila Belmiro)

November 20 10	São Paulo	6–2	Ponte Preta	São Paulo
	Goal		Goal	Stadium: Estádio Municipal Paulo Machado de Carvalho (Pacaembu)

November 24 11	XV de Piracicaba	3–5	São Paulo	Piracicaba
	Goal		Goal	Stadium: Campo da Rua Regente Feijó

November 30 12	Jabaquara	1–2	São Paulo	Santos
	Goal		Goal	Stadium: Estádio Urbano Caldeira (Vila Belmiro)

December 3 13	Santos	2–2	São Paulo	São Paulo
	Goal		Goal	Stadium: Estádio Municipal Paulo Machado de Carvalho (Pacaembu)

December 7 14	Botafogo-SP	0–0	São Paulo	Ribeirão Preto
				Stadium: Estádio Luís Pereira

December 15 15	Portuguesa Santista	2–3	São Paulo	Santos
	Goal		Goal	Stadium: Estádio Ulrico Mursa

December 19 16	Portuguesa	1–3	São Paulo	São Paulo
	Goal		Goal	Stadium: Estádio Municipal Paulo Machado de Carvalho (Pacaembu)

December 22 17	Palmeiras	0–1	São Paulo	São Paulo
			Goal	Stadium: Estádio Municipal Paulo Machado de Carvalho (Pacaembu)

December 29 18	São Paulo	3–1	Corinthians	São Paulo
	Goal		Goal	Stadium: Estádio Municipal Paulo Machado de Carvalho (Pacaembu)

==== Record ====
Final Position	Points	Matches	Wins	Draws	Losses	Goals For	Goals Away	Win%
1st	55	37	23	9	5	99	43	74%
