= Alfredo Ramos (Brazilian footballer) =

Brazilian footballer and manager (1924-2012)

- Ramos before a match c. 1955

Personal information
- Full name: Alfredo Ramos Castilho
- Date of birth: 27 October 1924
- Place of birth: Jacareí (SP) - Brazil
- Date of death: 31 July 2012 (aged 87)
- Place of death: São Paulo (SP) - Brazil

Senior career*
Years	Team	Apps	(Gls)
1945	Juventus-SP	0	(0)
1947–1950	Santos	0	(0)
1950–1957	São Paulo	285	(3)
1957–1959	Corinthians	33	(1)
Total		318	(4)

International career
1953–1956	Brazil	9	(0)

Managerial career
- 1961: Corinthians
- 1972: São Paulo
- * Club domestic league appearances and goals

Alfredo Ramos Castilho (27 October 1924 in Jacareí – 31 July 2012), was a Brazilian footballer in the defense role. He was simply known as Alfredo or Polvo by fans.

In his career as player for Santos (1947–1951), São Paulo (1951–1958 and 1961) and Corinthians (1958–1960), he played 633 games, scoring 3 goals, and won one São Paulo State Championship in 1953. With the Brazilian team, he was in the first team in 10 games and was listed in the roster for the 1954 FIFA World Cup, without playing any games. In the 1970s, he was coach for the São Paulo squad (see List of São Paulo Futebol Clube managers).

== Honours ==
São Paulo

- Campeonato Paulista: 1953, 1957
