= Cícero Pompeu de Toledo =

Brazilian football chairman

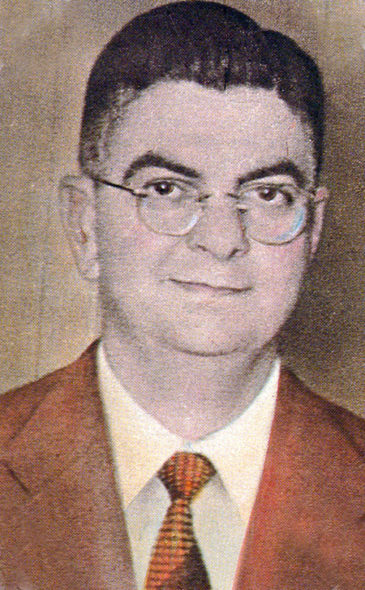
- Born: 7 January 1910; Piracicaba, Brazil
- Died: 8 September 1959 (aged 49); São Paulo, Brazil
- Occupation: President of São Paulo FC (1947–1958)
- Years active: 1939–1958
- Notable credit: Creator of the Estádio do Morumbi

Cícero Pompeu de Toledo (7 January 1910 – 8 September 1959), was a president of São Paulo FC.

== Biography ==
Cícero Pompeu de Toledo joined the board of São Paulo in 1939, being elected president for the first time in 1947, being re-elected later until 1958, when he abdicated the presidency to take care of his health. His great contribution was the ambitious project that culminated in the construction of the Morumbi Stadium, which bears his name in posthumous honor, since on 8 September 1959, Toledo died of a massive heart attack.
