= Joreca =

Portuguese football manager

Personal information
- Full name: Jorge Gomes de Lima
- Date of birth: 7 January 1904
- Place of birth: Lisbon, Portugal
- Date of death: 5 December 1949 (aged 45)
- Place of death: São Paulo, Brazil

Managerial career
- Years: Team
- 1943–1944: São Paulo
- 1944: Brazil
- 1944–1947: São Paulo
- 1949: Corinthians

Jorge Gomes de Lima, or simply Joreca (7 January 1904 – 5 December 1949) was a Portuguese football manager, journalist and football referee who made his career in Brazilian football. Starting as a radio columnist and commentator, he graduated in Physical Education at the University of São Paulo, in the early 1940s, and began his coaching career in the amateur teams of São Paulo city.

Before becoming a manager, he also served as a referee in professional football, in 1942. In 1943, he was hired by São Paulo and in the first year of his career, he was champion of the Campeonato Paulista. Due to the meteoric rise, he was invited to coach the Brazilian national squad in 1944 (alongside Flávio Costa), in two friendly games against Uruguay, coming out victorious in both matches (4–0 and 6–1). Joreca returned to São Paulo FC where he remained until 1947, winning two more times the Campeonato Paulista (1945 and 1946).

In 1949 he was hired by Corinthians, and is credited with being largely responsible for discovering Baltazar. He died due to a cardiac arrest on 5 December, two months after resigning from Corinthians. He was also an amateur boxer, having won the two fights in which he participated.

== Honours ==
=== São Paulo FC ===
- Campeonato Paulista:
  - Winners (3): 1943, 1945, 1946
- Taça Cidade de São Paulo:
  - Winners: 1944
