= 1957 in Brazilian football =

Football in Brazil
- Season: 1957

The following article presents a summary of the 1957 football (soccer) season in Brazil, which was the 56th season of competitive football in the country.

== Torneio Rio-São Paulo ==
Final Standings

| Position | Team | Points | Played | Won | Drawn | Lost | For | Against | Difference |
|---|---|---|---|---|---|---|---|---|---|
| 1 | Fluminense | 16 | 9 | 7 | 2 | 0 | 23 | 11 | 12 |
| 2 | Vasco da Gama | 11 | 9 | 5 | 1 | 3 | 17 | 14 | 3 |
| 3 | Flamengo | 11 | 9 | 5 | 1 | 3 | 19 | 11 | 8 |
| 4 | Santos | 10 | 9 | 4 | 2 | 3 | 22 | 16 | 6 |
| 5 | Portuguesa | 9 | 9 | 4 | 1 | 4 | 21 | 21 | 0 |
| 6 | Botafogo | 9 | 9 | 3 | 3 | 3 | 16 | 19 | -3 |
| 7 | São Paulo | 8 | 9 | 3 | 2 | 4 | 14 | 12 | 2 |
| 8 | Palmeiras | 6 | 9 | 1 | 4 | 4 | 14 | 22 | -8 |
| 9 | Corinthians | 6 | 9 | 1 | 4 | 4 | 10 | 20 | -10 |
| 10 | América | 4 | 9 | 2 | 0 | 7 | 10 | 20 | -10 |

Fluminense declared as the Torneio Rio-São Paulo champions.

== State championship champions ==
| State | Champion | State | Champion |
|---|---|---|---|
| Acre | Rio Branco-AC | Paraíba | Botafogo-PB |
| Alagoas | CSA | Paraná | Coritiba |
| Amapá | Macapá | Pernambuco | Santa Cruz |
| Amazonas | Nacional | Piauí | Botafogo-PI |
| Bahia | Vitória | Rio de Janeiro | not disputed |
| Ceará | Ceará | Rio de Janeiro (DF) | Botafogo |
| Espírito Santo | Rio Branco-ES | Rio Grande do Norte | América-RN |
| Goiás | Atlético Goianiense | Rio Grande do Sul | Grêmio |
| Maranhão | Ferroviário-MA | Rondônia | Ferroviário-RO |
| Mato Grosso | Atlético Matogrossense | Santa Catarina | Hercílio Luz |
| Minas Gerais | América-MG | São Paulo | São Paulo |
| Pará | Paysandu | Sergipe | Santa Cruz-SE |

== Brazil national team ==
The following table lists all the games played by the Brazil national football team in official competitions and friendly matches during 1957.

| Date | Opposition | Result | Score | Brazil scorers | Competition |
|---|---|---|---|---|---|
| March 13, 1957 | Chile | W | 4-2 | Didi (3), Pepe | South American Championship |
| March 21, 1957 | Ecuador | W | 7-1 | Evaristo (2), Pepe, Zizinho, Joel (2), Índio | South American Championship |
| March 23, 1957 | Colombia | W | 9-0 | Evaristo (5), Didi (2), Zizinho, Pepe | South American Championship |
| March 28, 1957 | Uruguay | L | 2-3 | Evaristo, Didi | South American Championship |
| March 31, 1957 | Peru | W | 1-0 | Didi | South American Championship |
| April 3, 1957 | Argentina | L | 0-3 | - | South American Championship |
| April 13, 1957 | Peru | D | 1-1 | Índio | World Cup Qualifying |
| April 21, 1957 | Peru | W | 1-0 | Didi | World Cup Qualifying |
| June 11, 1957 | Portugal | W | 2-1 | Didi, Tite | International Friendly |
| June 16, 1957 | Portugal | W | 3-0 | Zito, Mazola, Del Vecchio | International Friendly |
| July 7, 1957 | Argentina | L | 1-2 | Pelé | Roca Cup |
| July 10, 1957 | Argentina | W | 2-0 | Pelé, Mazola | Roca Cup |
| September 15, 1957 | Chile | L | 0-1 | - | Bernardo O'Higgins Cup |
| September 18, 1957 | Chile | D | 1-1 | Matos | Bernardo O'Higgins Cup |
