= João Leal Neto =

Brazilian footballer (1937–2025)

Personal information
- Full name: João Leal Neto
- Date of birth: 25 September 1937
- Place of birth: Santos, São Paulo, Brazil
- Date of death: 29 July 2025 (aged 87)
- Place of death: Campinas, São Paulo, Brazil
- Position: Midfielder

Youth career
- –1954: Brasil FC (Santos)

Senior career*
| Years | Team | Apps | (Gls) |
| 1954 | Santos | | |
| 1955 | Fluminense | | |
| 1956 | Jabaquara | | |
| 1957–1958 | América-SP | | |
| 1958–1959 | Guarani | | |
| 1960–1962 | Noroeste | | |
| 1963–1964 | São Paulo | 54 | (4) |
| 1965 | Botafogo-SP | | |
| 1966 | Ponte Preta | | |

International career
| 1954 | Brazil U20 | | |

Managerial career
- 1967: Noroeste
- 1967–1968: América-SP
- 1968: Ponte Preta
- 1978: Dom Bosco
- 1978: Noroeste
- 1978–1979: Guarani (assistant)
- 1980–1981: São Paulo (assistant)
- 1981: São Paulo (caretaker)
- 1981: América-SP
- 1987–1988: Brazil (assistant)
- 1989–1990: São Paulo (assistant)
- 1995: Gama
- 1995–1996: Ittihad Kalba
- 1999–2000: Santos (assistant)
- 2000–2002: Guarani (assistant)
- * Club domestic league appearances and goals

João Leal Neto (25 September 1937 – 29 July 2025) was a Brazilian professional footballer, manager and referee, who played as a midfielder.

== Career ==
Leal began his career at Brasil FC de Santos, an amateur club. Upon being called up for the 1954 South American U-20 Championship in Venezuela, he was signed with Santos. He didn't stay for more than a few games and went to Fluminense in 1955, returning to the city of Santos in 1956, this time at Jabaquara. At América de São José do Rio Preto, he was champion of the second division of São Paulo in 1957. And in 1963, he was part of the champion squad of the Pequeña Taça del Mundo with São Paulo FC. He ended his career at the age of 29 at Ponte Preta.

As a coach, he managed several of the former clubs he played for, and was Carlos Alberto Silva's assistant in several jobs, including Brazil in 1987 and 1988. He was champion of the second division of the United Arab Emirates in 1996.

== Death ==
Leal Neto died in Campinas on 29 July 2025, at the age of 87.

== Honours ==
=== Player ===
São Paulo

- Small Club World Cup: 1963

América

- Campeonato Paulista Série A2: 1957

=== Manager ===
Ittihad Kalba

- UAE Division One: 1995–96
