= Estádio Antarctica Paulista =

Football stadium in São Paulo, Brazil

- Antônio Alonso, Rua da Mooca
- Interactive map of Estádio Antarctica Paulista
- Location: São Paulo, São Paulo state, Brazil
- Coordinates: 23.55482557205181°S 46.61183543322041°W
- Owner: Companhia Antarctica Paulista
- Capacity: 5.000
- Surface: grass
- Field size: 96 x 60m

Construction
- Opened: 1920
- Demolished: After 1943

Tenants
- Antarctica FC (1920–1931); CA Paulista (1933–1936); CA Estudante Paulista (1937–1940); São Paulo FC (1938–1943)

The Estádio Antarctica Paulista, also known as Estádio da Rua da Mooca, was an association football stadium in São Paulo, Brazil.

Owned by the Companhia Antarctica Paulista, it was used from 1920 to 1943 in matches of the Campeonato Paulista. It is currently the parking lot of the Bavaria Brewery, part of the Ambev group. It was located a few blocks from the Estádio Conde Rodolfo Crespi, the CA Juventus home.
