= Milton Cruz =

Brazilian football manager and former player

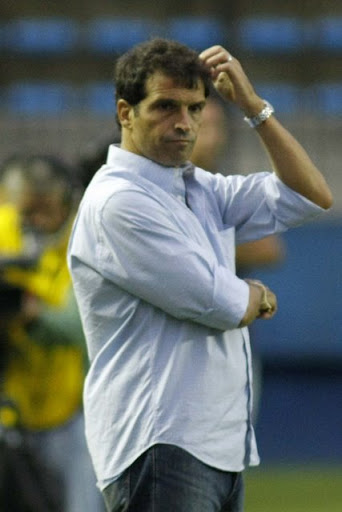
- Milton Cruz with São Paulo in 2010

Personal information
- Full name: Milton da Cruz
- Date of birth: 1 August 1957 (age 69)
- Place of birth: Cubatão, Brazil
- Height: 1.79 m (5 ft 10 in)
- Position: Forward

Team information
- Current team: São Paulo (assistant)

Youth career
- 1975–1977: São Paulo

Senior career*
Years	Team	Apps	(Gls)
1977–1979	São Paulo		
1980–1982	Estudiantes Tecos	31	(3)
1982–1983	Nacional		
1983–1985	Internacional	6	(2)
1985–1986	Sport Recife	15	(2)
1987	Catuense		
1987	Náutico		
1988	Yomiuri	13	(4)
1989	Nissan Motors		
1989–1990	Botafogo	12	(4)
1990–1992	Kashima Antlers	48	(35)
1993	Oklahoma City Slickers	16	(14)

International career
1984	Brazil Olympic	3	(0)

Managerial career
- 1996–2002: São Paulo (assistant)
- 1999: São Paulo (interim)
- 2002: Ittihad (assistant)
- 2003–2016: São Paulo (assistant)
- 2005: São Paulo (interim)
- 2009: São Paulo (interim)
- 2010: São Paulo (interim)
- 2011: São Paulo (interim)
- 2011: São Paulo (interim)
- 2012: São Paulo (interim)
- 2013: São Paulo (interim)
- 2015: São Paulo (interim)
- 2015: São Paulo (interim)
- 2017: Náutico
- 2017–2018: Figueirense
- 2019: Sport Recife
- 2021–: São Paulo (assistant)
Medal record
Men's Football
Silver medal – second place	1984 Los Angeles	Team competition
- * Club domestic league appearances and goals

Milton da Cruz (born 1 August 1957) is a Brazilian professional football coach and former player who played as a forward. He is the current assistant manager of São Paulo.

His career is widely related to São Paulo, club he represented as a player and served as an interim manager on a number of occasions before leaving in 2016.

== Club career ==
Known as Milton in his playing days, he joined São Paulo's youth setup in 1975, being promoted to the first team in 1977. He subsequently represented Estudiantes Tecos, Nacional Montevideo, Internacional, Sport Recife, Catuense, Náutico, Yomiuri FC, Nissan Motors FC, Botafogo and Kashima Antlers.

In May 1993, Cruz joined Oklahoma City Slickers of the USISL. He was the club's topscorer, as his side finished third, and subsequently retired at the age of 36.

== International career ==
Cruz appeared with Brazil under-23s at the 1984 Summer Olympics in United States, appearing in three matches only as a substitute.

== Coaching career ==
In 1997 Cruz returned to his first club São Paulo, as an assistant manager. In 1999, after Paulo César Carpegiani's dismissal, he was named interim.

In 2002, Cruz left Tricolor to join Oscar's staff at Ittihad, but returned to the club in the following year. Until his dismissal from the club in March 2016, he worked as an assistant coach, being an interim on nine further occasions.

On 19 February 2017, Cruz had his first experience as a head coach, being named in charge of Náutico. He was sacked on 7 May, despite having only three defeats in 12 matches.

On 8 August 2017, Cruz was appointed head coach of Figueirense in the Série B, but left on 10 September of the following year. On 18 December 2018, he was named at the helm of Sport Recife for the upcoming season.

On 18 February 2019, after just seven matches, Cruz resigned from Sport. He returned to São Paulo on 9 March 2021, as a technical consultant, being later named Rogério Ceni's assistant on 19 October.

== Club statistics ==
Club performance			League		Cup		League Cup		Total	
Season	Club	League	Apps	Goals	Apps	Goals	Apps	Goals	Apps	Goals
Japan			League		Emperor's Cup		J.League Cup		Total	
1987/88	Yomiuri	JSL Division 1	8	4	0	0	0	0	8	4
1988/89	Yomiuri	JSL Division 1	5	0	0	0	0	0	5	0
1990/91	Sumitomo Metal	JSL Division 2	24	22	-		2	1	26	23
1991/92	Sumitomo Metal	JSL Division 2	24	13	-		1	0	25	13
1992	Kashima Antlers	J1 League	-		0	0	9	2	9	2
Country	Japan		61	39	0	0	12	3	73	42
Total			61	39	0	0	12	3	73	42

== Honours ==
Figueirense

- Campeonato Catarinense: 2018
