= Manoel Raymundo Paes de Almeida =

Brazilian football chairman

- Born: 11 November 1921; Uberaba, Brazil
- Died: 20 October 2014 (aged 92); São Paulo, Brazil
- Occupation(s): Counselor of São Paulo FC (1973–2014); Founder of TUSP (Torcida Uniformizada do São Paulo); Manager
- Years active: 1934–2014

Manoel Raymundo Paes de Almeida (11 November 1921 – 20 October 2014), was the No. 3 member of São Paulo FC, counselor, caretaker manager and founder of TUSP (Torcida Uniformizada do São Paulo), first organized fan base in Brazil.

== Biography ==
A member of the club since 1934, being counted as the third overall, Manoel Raymundo Paes de Almeida, actively participated in São Paulo FC during his life. In 1939 he founded Grêmio São-Paulino, which later gave rise to TUSP. He was the organizer of the 1943 Campeonato Paulista title celebration, in addition to being responsible for bringing Béla Guttmann to the club in 1957, which resulted in the state title that season. He was interim president in 1966 for eight months, replacing Laudo Natel, and counselor advisor since 1973. He died on 20 October 2014, giving his name to the social club's sports complex, in Morumbi.

== Managerial career ==
Almeida had two spells as caretaker coach, in 1958 and 1961, with 15 matches, 7 wins, 6 draws and two defeats.
