= Hélio Caxambu =

Brazilian footballer (1918–1997)

Caxambu
Personal information
- Full name: Hélio Geraldo Caxambu
- Date of birth: October 15, 1918
- Place of birth: Campinas, Brazil
- Date of death: 12 September 1997 (aged 78)
- Place of death: Campinas, Brazil
- Position: Goalkeeper

Youth career
- 1933–1934: Portuguesa

Senior career*
Years	Team	Apps	(Gls)
1935–1936	Portuguesa		
1937–1943	São Paulo	80	(0)
1940	→ Ponte Preta (loan)		
1944–1949	Portuguesa		
1950–1952	Juventus-SP		

Managerial career
- 1957: São Paulo (caretaker)
- 1961: São Paulo (caretaker)
- 1962: São Paulo (caretaker)
- * Club domestic league appearances and goals as of 7 September 2023

Hélio Geraldo Caxambu (15 October 1918 – 12 September 1997), simply known as Caxambu, was a Brazilian professional footballer, referee and manager who played as a goalkeeper.

== Career ==
Caxambu worked as a painter in the early 1930s, when he had the opportunity to play for Portuguesa, taking part in the conquest of the two APEA states in 1935 and 1936. He went to São Paulo FC in the next year, where he would be successful alongside players like Leônidas and Sastre. He was also acted as a referee, organized the first entity that took care of athletes' rights in São Paulo, and returned to São Paulo FC as an employee and eventual carekater.

== Honours ==
=== Portuguesa ===
- Campeonato Paulista: 1935, 1936

=== São Paulo ===
- Campeonato Paulista: 1943
