= 1936 in Brazilian football =

Football in Brazil
- Season: 1936

The 1936 football (soccer) season was the 35th season of competitive football in Brazil.

== Campeonato Paulista ==
In 1936, there were two different editions of the Campeonato Paulista. One was organized by the Associação Paulista de Esportes Atléticos (APEA) while the other one was organized by the Liga Paulista de Foot-Ball (LPF).

=== APEA's Campeonato Paulista ===
Final Standings

Position	Team	Points	Played	Won	Drawn	Lost	For	Against	Difference
1	Portuguesa	21	12	10	1	1	54	14	40
2	Ypiranga-SP	19	12	9	1	2	32	20	12
3	EC São Caetano	15	12	6	3	3	26	22	4
4	Tremembé	9	12	2	5	5	11	25	-14
5	1º de Maio	8	12	3	2	7	16	26	-10
6	Humberto Primo	6	12	2	2	8	17	30	-13
7	Ordem e Progresso	6	12	3	0	9	21	40	-19

Portuguesa declared as the APEA's Campeonato Paulista champions.

=== LPF's Campeonato Paulista ===
The LPF's Campeonato Paulista final was played between Palestra Itália-SP and Corinthians.

April 25, 1937

Palestra Itália-SP	1–0	Corinthians

May 2, 1937

Corinthians	0–0	Palestra Itália-SP

May 9, 1937

Palestra Itália-SP	2–1	Corinthians

Palestra Itália-SP declared as the LPF's Campeonato Paulista champions by aggregate score of 3-1.

== Campeonato Carioca ==
In 1936, there were two different editions of the Campeonato Carioca. One was organized by the Federação Metropolitana de Desportos (FMD) while the other one was organized by the Liga Carioca de Foot-Ball (LCF).

=== FMD's Campeonato Carioca ===
The FMD's Campeonato Carioca final was played between Vasco da Gama and Madureira.

December 6, 1936

Vasco da Gama	0–1	Madureira

Rua Barão de São Francisco

December 13, 1936

Vasco da Gama	2–1	Madureira

Rua Barão de São Francisco

March 14, 1937

Vasco da Gama	2–1	Madureira

Rua Barão de São Francisco

Vasco da Gama declared as the FMD's Campeonato Carioca champions by the aggregate score of 4-3.

=== LCF's Campeonato Carioca ===
The LCF's Campeonato Carioca final was played between Fluminense and Flamengo.

December 20, 1936

Fluminense	2–2	Flamengo

Laranjeiras

December 23, 1936

Fluminense	4–1	Flamengo

Laranjeiras

December 27, 1936

Fluminense	1–1	Flamengo

Laranjeiras

Fluminense declared as the LCF's Campeonato Carioca champions by the aggregate score of 7-4.

== State championship champions ==
State	Champion	State	Champion
Acre	-	Paraíba	Botafogo-PB
Alagoas	CSA	Paraná	Atlético Paranaense
Amapá	-	Pernambuco	Tramways-PE
Amazonas	Nacional	Piauí	-
Bahia	Bahia	Rio de Janeiro	Alliança
Ceará	Maguari	Rio de Janeiro (DF)	Vasco (by FMD); Fluminense (by LFC)
Espírito Santo	Rio Branco-ES	Rio Grande do Norte	ABC
Goiás	-	Rio Grande do Sul	Rio Grande
Maranhão	not disputed	Rondônia	-
Mato Grosso	-	Santa Catarina	Figueirense
Minas Gerais	Atlético Mineiro	São Paulo	Portuguesa (by APEA); Palestra Itália-SP (by LPF)
Pará	Remo	Sergipe	Cotingüiba

== Other competition champions ==
Competition	Champion
Campeonato Brasileiro de Seleções Estaduais	São Paulo

== Brazil national team ==
The following table lists all the games played by the Brazil national football team in official competitions and friendly matches during 1936.

Date	Opposition	Result	Score	Brazil scorers	Competition
December 27, 1936	Peru	W	3-2	Roberto, Afonsinho, Niginho	South American Championship
