= Clube Atlético Paulista =

Brazilian football club

Paulista
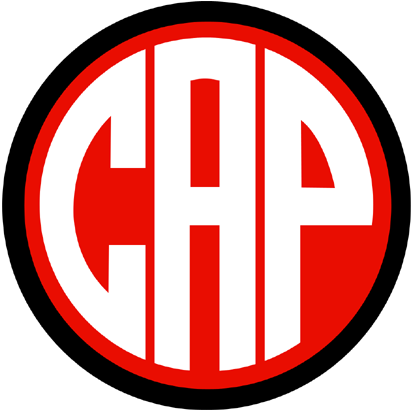
- Badge of CA Paulista
- Founded: 1933
- Dissolved: 1938
| Home colours | Away colours |

The Clube Atlético Paulista was an association football club from the Brazilian metropolis São Paulo.

The club emerged around 1933 from a union of SC Internacional – founded 1899 and the third oldest football club in town, champion of São Paulo in 1907 and 1928 – and Antarctica FC, founded in 1915 by the brewery of the same name and a second division club since 1930. Antarctica FC brought into this merger the stadium Estádio Antarctica Paulista in the Rua da Mooca, also known as Estádio Antônio Alonso and then one of the most important football venues in town.

Paulista played from 1934 to 1936 three seasons in the first division of São Paulo, where it generally adhered to the lower end of the table. Before the 1937 season, CA Paulista joined with the Clube Atlético Estudantes de São Paulo to form the Clube Atlético Estudante Paulista. This club in turn became in 1938 part of the São Paulo FC.

CA Paulista also maintained, at least for some time, a basketball team.
