= List of Brazil international footballers (2–5 caps) =

The Brazil national football team represents the country of Brazil in international association football. It is fielded by the Brazilian Football Confederation (CBF), the governing body of football in Brazil, and competes as a member of CONMEBOL, which encompasses the countries of South America.

== Key ==
Positions key
| GK | Goalkeeper |
| DF | Defender |
| MF | Midfielder |
| FW | Forward |

Player
This colour background and the * symbol indicate that the player is currently active at the club level.
Position
Playing positions are listed according to the player's primary position while playing for the national team.
Caps and goals
Caps and goals comprise all those in official "A" international matches as recognised by the CBF. This includes competitive matches (FIFA World Cup qualifying and final tournaments, FIFA Confederations Cup, CONCACAF Gold Cup, etc.) and international friendly matches.

== Players ==
Brazil national football team players with between 2 and 5 caps
| Player | Position | Caps | Goals | Debut | | Last or most recent match | | Pos. ref. |
| Player | Position | Caps | Goals | Date | Opponent | Date | Opponent | Pos. ref. |
|---|---|---|---|---|---|---|---|---|
| Nery; Emmanuel Augusto Nery | DF | 5 | 0 | 20 September 1914 | Argentina | 12 July 1916 | Uruguay | |
| Luís Menezes; Luiz Maia de Bittencourt Menezes | FW | 5 | 0 | 8 July 1916 | Chile | 11 May 1919 | Chile | |
| Bianco; Bianco Spartaco Gambini | DF | 5 | 0 | 11 May 1919 | Chile | 1 June 1919 | Argentina | |
| Telefone; José de Almeida Netto | DF | 5 | 0 | 18 September 1920 | Uruguay | 23 October 1921 | Uruguay | |
| Formiga; Afrodísio Xavier Camargo | FW | 5 | 2 | 17 September 1922 | Chile | 22 October 1922 | Paraguay | |
| Barthô; Bartholomeu Vicente Gugani | DF | 5 | 0 | 17 September 1922 | Chile | 22 October 1922 | Paraguay | |
| Tatú; Altino Marcondes | FW | 5 | 1 | 17 September 1922 | Chile | 22 October 1922 | Paraguay | |
| Moderato; Moderato Visintainer | FW | 5 | 2 | 6 December 1925 | Paraguay | 20 July 1930 | Bolivia | |
| Teóphilo; Teóphylo Bethencourt Pereira | FW | 5 | 2 | 14 July 1930 | Yugoslavia | 6 September 1931 | Uruguay | |
| Hermógenes Fonseca; Hermógenes Valente da Fonseca | MF | 5 | 0 | 14 July 1930 | Yugoslavia | 6 September 1931 | Uruguay | |
| Itália; Luiz Gervazzoni | DF | 5 | 0 | 14 July 1930 | Yugoslavia | 4 December 1932 | Uruguay | |
| Niginho; Oswaldo Leonídio Fantoni | FW | 5 | 2 | 27 December 1936 | Peru | 30 January 1937 | Argentina | |
| Tunga; Sebastião Couto | MF | 5 | 0 | 27 December 1936 | Peru | 30 January 1937 | Argentina | |
| Osvaldo Gerico; Oswaldo de Carvalho | DF | 5 | 0 | 14 January 1942 | Chile | 5 February 1942 | Paraguay | |
| Sylvio Pirillo; Sylvio Pirillo Cesarino | FW | 5 | 6 | 14 January 1942 | Chile | 31 January 1942 | Ecuador | |
| Nena; Olavo Rodrigues Barbosa | MF | 5 | 0 | 29 March 1947 | Uruguay | 13 May 1950 | Paraguay | |
| Wilson; Wilson Francisco Alves | DF | 5 | 0 | 3 April 1949 | Ecuador | 8 May 1949 | Paraguay | |
| Bodinho; Nílton Coelho da Costa | FW | 5 | 2 | 1 March 1956 | Chile | 18 March 1956 | Argentina | |
| Duarte; José Antônio Candiota da Silva Duarte | DF | 5 | 0 | 1 March 1956 | Chile | 18 March 1956 | Argentina | |
| Flávio Pinho; Flávio Pinho | DF | 5 | 0 | 1 March 1956 | Chile | 18 March 1956 | Argentina | |
| Luizinho; Luiz José Marques | MF | 5 | 1 | 1 March 1956 | Chile | 18 March 1956 | Argentina | |
| Odorico; Odorico Araújo Goulart | DF | 5 | 0 | 1 March 1956 | Chile | 18 March 1956 | Argentina | |
| Ênio Andrade; Ênio Vargas de Andrade | MF | 5 | 1 | 1 March 1956 | Chile | 18 March 1956 | Argentina | |
| Ferreira; Antenor Ferreira de Carvalho Filho | FW | 5 | 4 | 12 June 1956 | Paraguay | 8 July 1956 | Argentina | |
| Paulo Valentim; Paulo Ângelo Valentim | FW | 5 | 5 | 15 March 1959 | Chile | 4 April 1959 | Argentina | |
| Biu; Severino Rodrigues da Silva | DF | 5 | 0 | 5 December 1959 | Paraguay | 27 December 1959 | Ecuador | |
| Elias; Elias Soares de Oliveira | FW | 5 | 0 | 5 December 1959 | Paraguay | 27 December 1959 | Ecuador | |
| Geraldo José; Geraldo José da Silva | FW | 5 | 2 | 5 December 1959 | Paraguay | 27 December 1959 | Ecuador | |
| Givaldo; Givaldo Bezerra Cordeiro | DF | 5 | 0 | 5 December 1959 | Paraguay | 27 December 1959 | Ecuador | |
| Traçaia; José Roque Paes | MF | 5 | 1 | 5 December 1959 | Paraguay | 27 December 1959 | Ecuador | |
| Waldemar; Waldemar Chiarelli | GK | 5 | 0 | 5 December 1959 | Paraguay | 27 December 1959 | Ecuador | |
| Zequinha; José Pereira Miná | DF | 5 | 0 | 5 December 1959 | Paraguay | 27 December 1959 | Ecuador | |
| Zé de Mello; José Inácio de Mello | MF | 5 | 2 | 5 December 1959 | Paraguay | 27 December 1959 | Ecuador | |
| Alfeu; Alfeu Martha de Freitas | MF | 5 | 1 | 10 March 1960 | Costa Rica | 20 March 1960 | Argentina | |
| Orlando Rosa; Orlando Rosa Romagna | DF | 5 | 0 | 10 March 1960 | Costa Rica | 20 March 1960 | Argentina | |
| Victor Ratautas; Victor Ratautas | DF | 5 | 0 | 29 April 1960 | United Arab Republic | 26 May 1960 | Argentina | |
| Tião Macalé; Sebastião dos Santos | MF | 5 | 0 | 3 March 1963 | Paraguay | 31 March 1963 | Bolivia | |
| Cláudio Danni; Cláudio João Danni | DF | 5 | 0 | 27 March 1963 | Ecuador | 24 April 1963 | Belgium | |
| Picasso; Ronei Paulo Travi | GK | 5 | 0 | 7 September 1965 | Uruguay | 17 December 1968 | Yugoslavia | |
| Zé Carlos; José Carlos Bernardo | MF | 5 | 0 | 11 August 1968 | Argentina | 4 October 1975 | Peru | |
| Zequinha; José Márcio Pereira da Silva | MF | 5 | 0 | 11 July 1971 | Austria | 24 July 1971 | Paraguay | |
| Claudiomiro; Claudiomiro Estrais Ferreira | FW | 5 | 1 | 14 July 1971 | Czechoslovakia | 31 July 1971 | Argentina | |
| Wendell; Wendell Lucena Ramalho | GK | 5 | 0 | 6 June 1973 | Tunisia | 12 May 1974 | Paraguay | |
| Campos; Cosme da Silva Campos | FW | 5 | 2 | 30 July 1975 | Venezuela | 4 October 1975 | Peru | |
| Geraldo Assoviador; Geraldo Cleofas Dias Alves | MF | 5 | 0 | 30 September 1975 | Peru | 9 June 1976 | Paraguay | |
| Flecha; Gilberto Alves de Souza | MF | 5 | 0 | 25 February 1976 | Uruguay | 9 June 1976 | Paraguay | |
| Wladimir; Wladimir Rodrigues dos Santos | DF | 5 | 0 | 20 February 1977 | Colombia | 21 May 1985 | Chile | |
| Zenon; Zenon de Souza Farias | MF | 5 | 0 | 26 July 1979 | Bolivia | 17 June 1984 | Argentina | |
| João Leite; João Leite da Silva Neto | GK | 5 | 0 | 21 December 1980 | Switzerland | 1 February 1981 | Colombia | |
| China; Henrique Walmir da Conceição | MF | 5 | 0 | 17 August 1983 | Ecuador | 4 November 1983 | Uruguay | |
| Jandir Bugs; Jandir Bugs | MF | 5 | 0 | 17 June 1984 | Argentina | 21 May 1985 | Chile | |
| Ademir; Ademir Roque Kaeffer | MF | 5 | 0 | 7 July 1988 | Australia | 12 October 1988 | Belgium | |
| Bernardo; Bernardo Fernandes da Silva | MF | 5 | 0 | 12 April 1989 | Paraguay | 18 June 1989 | Denmark | |
| Marco Antônio Boiadeiro; Marco Antônio Ribeiro | MF | 5 | 0 | 6 June 1993 | United States | 27 June 1993 | Argentina | |
| Alexandre Lopes; Alexandre Paes Lopes | DF | 5 | 1 | 20 December 1995 | Colombia | 22 May 1996 | Croatia | |
| Carlinhos; Carlos Augusto Rodrigues | DF | 5 | 1 | 20 December 1995 | Colombia | 21 January 1996 | Mexico | |
| Dodô; Ricardo Lucas | FW | 5 | 2 | 10 August 1997 | South Korea | 11 November 1997 | Wales | |
| Russo; Ricardo Soares Florêncio | DF | 5 | 0 | 10 September 1997 | Ecuador | 8 February 1998 | El Salvador | |
| Rôni; Roniéliton Pereira Santos | FW | 5 | 2 | 5 June 1999 | Netherlands | 4 August 1999 | Mexico | |
| Athirson; Athirson Mazolli e Oliveira | DF | 5 | 0 | 30 July 1999 | New Zealand | 30 April 2003 | Mexico | |
| Léomar Leiria; Leomar Leiria | MF | 5 | 0 | 25 April 2001 | Peru | 7 June 2001 | France | |
| Ramon Menezes; Ramón Menezes Hubner | MF | 5 | 1 | 31 May 2001 | Cameroon | 9 June 2001 | Australia | |
| Carlos Miguel; Carlos Miguel da Silva Júnior | MF | 5 | 1 | 31 May 2001 | Cameroon | 9 June 2001 | Australia | |
| Marcelinho Paraíba; Marcelo dos Santos | MF | 5 | 1 | 9 August 2001 | Panama | 14 November 2001 | Venezuela | |
| Paulo Almeida; Paulo Almeida Santos | MF | 5 | 0 | 13 July 2003 | Mexico | 27 July 2003 | Mexico | |
| Carlos Alberto; Carlos Alberto Gomes de Jesus | MF | 5 | 0 | 15 July 2003 | Honduras | 27 April 2005 | Guatemala | |
| Rodrigo Caio; Rodrigo Caio Coquette Russo | DF | 5 | 0 | 29 May 2016 | Panama | 13 October 2020 | Peru | |
| Walace * Walace Souza Silva | MF | 5 | 0 | 8 June 2016 | Haiti | 20 November 2018 | Cameroon | |
| Caio Henrique * Caio Henrique Oliveira Silva | DF | 5 | 0 | 8 September 2023 | Bolivia | 18 November 2025 | Tunisia | |
| Lucas Beraldo * Lucas Lopes Beraldo | DF | 5 | 0 | 23 March 2024 | England | 14 October 2025 | Japan | |
| Éderson * Éderson José dos Santos Lourenço da Silva | MF | 5 | 0 | 8 June 2024 | Mexico | 5 July 2026 | Norway | |
| Igor Jesus * Igor Jesus Maciel da Cruz | FW | 5 | 1 | 10 October 2024 | Chile | 10 October 2025 | South Korea | |
| Igor Thiago * Igor Thiago Nascimento Rodrigues | FW | 5 | 2 | 26 March 2026 | France | 13 June 2026 | Morocco | |
| Carlos Augusto * Carlos Augusto Zopolato Neves | DF | 5 | 0 | 17 October 2023 | Uruguay | 14 November 2026 | Japan | |
| Alencar; Manoel Alencar do Monte | FW | 4 | 1 | 8 July 1916 | Chile | 18 July 1916 | Uruguay | |
| Chico Netto; Francisco Bueno Netto | DF | 4 | 0 | 3 October 1917 | Argentina | 16 October 1917 | Uruguay | |
| Vidal; Sylvio Vidal Leite Ribeiro | DF | 4 | 0 | 3 October 1917 | Argentina | 16 October 1917 | Uruguay | |
| Caetano Izzo; Caetano Izzo | FW | 4 | 1 | 3 October 1917 | Argentina | 16 October 1917 | Uruguay | |
| Antonio Dias; Antônio Dias | FW | 4 | 0 | 3 October 1917 | Argentina | 16 October 1917 | Uruguay | |
| Haroldo; Haroldo Pires Domingues | FW | 4 | 3 | 12 October 1917 | Chile | 1 June 1919 | Argentina | |
| Sérgio Pereira; Sérgio Pereira Pires | MF | 4 | 0 | 11 May 1919 | Chile | 29 May 1919 | Uruguay | |
| Alvaro Martins; Álvaro Martins | MF | 4 | 0 | 1 June 1919 | Argentina | 25 September 1920 | Argentina | |
| Junqueira; Durval Junqueira Machado | FW | 4 | 0 | 11 September 1920 | Chile | 24 September 1922 | Paraguay | |
| Alfredinho; Alfredo Silva | MF | 4 | 0 | 2 October 1921 | Argentina | 29 October 1922 | Paraguay | |
| Raphael Rodrigues; Raphael Rodrigues | FW | 4 | 0 | 17 September 1922 | Chile | 22 October 1922 | Paraguay | |
| Clodô; Clodoaldo Caldeira | DF | 4 | 0 | 22 October 1922 | Argentina | 17 December 1925 | Paraguay | |
| Soda; Cleóbulo Faria | MF | 4 | 0 | 18 November 1923 | Argentina | 9 December 1923 | Argentina | |
| Anfilogino Guarisi; Amphilóquio Guarisi Marques | FW | 4 | 1 | 6 December 1925 | Paraguay | 25 December 1925 | Argentina | |
| Carlos Nascimento; Carlos de Oliveira Nascimento | MF | 4 | 0 | 6 December 1925 | Paraguay | 25 December 1925 | Argentina | |
| Lagarto; Severino Franco da Silva | FW | 4 | 4 | 6 December 1925 | Paraguay | 25 December 1925 | Argentina | |
| Fausto dos Santos; Fausto dos Santos | MF | 4 | 0 | 14 July 1930 | Yugoslavia | 10 August 1930 | Yugoslavia | |
| Heitor Canalli; Heitor Canalli | MF | 4 | 0 | 4 December 1932 | Uruguay | 3 January 1937 | Chile | |
| Bahia; Antônio Almeida | FW | 4 | 1 | 27 December 1936 | Peru | 1 February 1937 | Argentina | |
| Nariz; Álvaro Lopes Cançado | DF | 4 | 0 | 3 January 1937 | Chile | 14 June 1938 | Czechoslovakia | |
| Britto; Hermínio Américo de Britto | DF | 4 | 0 | 13 January 1937 | Paraguay | 14 June 1938 | Czechoslovakia | |
| Lelé; Manoel Pessanha | FW | 4 | 1 | 10 March 1940 | Argentina | 16 December 1945 | Argentina | |
| Dino; Oswaldo Rodolpho da Silva | MF | 4 | 0 | 14 January 1942 | Chile | 5 February 1942 | Paraguay | |
| Alfredo II; Alfredo dos Santos Ramos | MF | 4 | 1 | 18 May 1944 | Uruguay | 28 June 1950 | Switzerland | |
| Ivan; Ivan José Macahyba Dias | MF | 4 | 0 | 5 January 1946 | Uruguay | 3 February 1946 | Chile | |
| Luiz Borracha; Luiz Gonzaga de Moura | GK | 4 | 0 | 10 February 1946 | Argentina | 11 April 1948 | Uruguay | |
| Octávio Moraes; Octávio Sérgio da Costa Moraes | FW | 4 | 1 | 3 April 1949 | Ecuador | 8 May 1949 | Paraguay | |
| Nininho; Antônio Francisco | FW | 4 | 3 | 10 April 1949 | Bolivia | 30 April 1949 | Uruguay | |
| Pavão; Marcos Cortez | DF | 4 | 0 | 13 November 1955 | Paraguay | 9 May 1956 | England | |
| Olavo; Olavo Martins de Oliveira | DF | 4 | 0 | 17 November 1955 | Paraguay | 3 April 1957 | Argentina | |
| Figueiró; Luiz Gonzaga Figueiró | DF | 4 | 0 | 6 March 1956 | Peru | 18 March 1956 | Argentina | |
| Valdir de Moraes; Waldir Joaquim de Morais | GK | 4 | 0 | 13 March 1956 | Costa Rica | 7 September 1965 | Uruguay | |
| Henrique Frade; Henrique Frade | FW | 4 | 2 | 10 March 1959 | Peru | 29 June 1961 | Paraguay | |
| Clóvis; Clóvis Pinheiro dos Santos | DF | 4 | 0 | 5 December 1959 | Paraguay | 22 December 1959 | Argentina | |
| Paulo Carvoeiro; Paulo Pisaneschi | FW | 4 | 4 | 5 December 1959 | Paraguay | 22 December 1959 | Argentina | |
| Gessy Lima; Gessi Lima | MF | 4 | 0 | 6 March 1960 | Mexico | 17 March 1960 | Costa Rica | |
| Ivo Diogo; Ivo Lul Diogo | FW | 4 | 0 | 6 March 1960 | Mexico | 20 March 1960 | Argentina | |
| Ortunho; Jorge Carlos Carneiro | DF | 4 | 0 | 6 March 1960 | Mexico | 20 March 1960 | Argentina | |
| Waldo; Waldo Machado da Silva | FW | 4 | 2 | 10 May 1960 | Denmark | 12 July 1960 | Argentina | |
| Aldemar; Aldemar dos Santos | DF | 4 | 0 | 29 May 1960 | Argentina | 29 June 1961 | Paraguay | |
| Jair Marinho; Jair Marinho de Oliveira | DF | 4 | 0 | 3 May 1961 | Paraguay | 12 May 1962 | Wales | |
| Ari de Souza; Ari de Souza | FW | 4 | 0 | 3 March 1963 | Paraguay | 24 March 1963 | Argentina | |
| Massinha; Benedito Aparecido dos Santos | DF | 4 | 0 | 3 March 1963 | Paraguay | 31 March 1963 | Bolivia | |
| Ilton Chaves; Ílton de Oliveira Chaves | MF | 4 | 1 | 3 March 1963 | Paraguay | 24 March 1963 | Argentina | |
| Danival; Danival de Oliveira | MF | 4 | 3 | 30 July 1975 | Venezuela | 16 August 1975 | Argentina | |
| Joãozinho; João Soares de Almeida Filho | MF | 4 | 0 | 13 August 1975 | Venezuela | 31 May 1979 | Uruguay | |
| Edu Bala; Carlos Eduardo da Silva | FW | 4 | 0 | 25 February 1976 | Uruguay | 9 June 1976 | Paraguay | |
| Nílton Batata; Nílton Pinheiro da Silva | MF | 4 | 3 | 17 May 1979 | Paraguay | 16 August 1979 | Bolivia | |
| Juninho Fonseca; Alcides Fonseca Júnior | DF | 4 | 0 | 25 September 1980 | Paraguay | 26 August 1981 | Chile | |
| João Paulo; João Paulo de Lima Filho | MF | 4 | 0 | 28 April 1983 | Chile | 28 July 1983 | Chile | |
| Toninho Carlos; Antônio Carlos Correia | DF | 4 | 0 | 17 June 1983 | Switzerland | 1 September 1983 | Ecuador | |
| Waldemar Barbosa; Waldemar Barbosa | MF | 4 | 0 | 25 April 1985 | Colombia | 5 May 1985 | Argentina | |
| Mirandinha; Francisco Ernandi Lima da Silva | FW | 4 | 1 | 19 May 1987 | England | 28 May 1987 | Finland | |
| Eduardo; Jorge Eduardo Gomes de Souza | DF | 4 | 0 | 9 December 1987 | Chile | 12 April 1989 | Paraguay | |
| Washington; Washington César Santos | FW | 4 | 1 | 9 December 1987 | Chile | 12 April 1989 | Paraguay | |
| Nílson; Nílson Esídio Mora | MF | 4 | 0 | 24 May 1989 | Peru | 25 November 1992 | Uruguay | |
| Gérson da Silva; Gérson da Silva | FW | 4 | 0 | 16 June 1989 | Sweden | 12 December 1990 | Mexico | |
| Adilson Batista; Adílson Dias Batista | DF | 4 | 0 | 17 October 1990 | Chile | 27 February 1991 | Paraguay | |
| Márcio Bittencourt; Henrymárcio Bittencourt | MF | 4 | 0 | 28 May 1991 | Bulgaria | 17 July 1991 | Argentina | |
| Valdir Benedito; Valdir Benedito | MF | 4 | 0 | 28 May 1991 | Bulgaria | 21 July 1991 | Chile | |
| Charles Guerreiro; Charles Natali de Mendonça Ayres | DF | 4 | 0 | 15 April 1992 | Finland | 8 November 1995 | Argentina | |
| Marcelinho Carioca; Marcelo Pereira Surcin | MF | 4 | 2 | 23 December 1994 | FR Yugoslavia | 25 April 2001 | Peru | |
| Souza; José Ivanaldo de Souza | MF | 4 | 1 | 22 February 1995 | Slovakia | 27 September 1995 | Romania | |
| Bruno Carvalho; Bruno Segadas Vianna de Carvalho | DF | 4 | 0 | 29 March 1995 | Honduras | 27 September 1995 | Romania | |
| Danrlei; Danrlei de Deus Hinterholz | GK | 4 | 0 | 29 March 1995 | Honduras | 26 June 1996 | Poland | |
| Sérgio Manoel; Sérgio Manoel Júnior | MF | 4 | 0 | 29 March 1995 | Honduras | 10 February 1998 | United States | |
| Caio Ribeiro; Caio Ribeiro Decoussau | FW | 4 | 3 | 12 January 1996 | Canada | 21 January 1996 | Mexico | |
| Warley; Warley Silva dos Santos | FW | 4 | 0 | 24 July 1999 | Germany | 4 August 1999 | Mexico | |
| Robert; Robert Silva Almeida | MF | 4 | 0 | 7 March 2001 | Mexico | 7 June 2001 | France | |
| Leandro Amaral; Leandro Câmara do Amaral | FW | 4 | 0 | 2 June 2001 | Canada | 9 June 2001 | Australia | |
| Tinga; Paulo César Fonseca do Nascimento | MF | 4 | 0 | 9 August 2001 | Panama | 6 February 2007 | Portugal | |
| Gil; Gilberto Ribeiro Gonçalves | MF | 4 | 1 | 11 June 2003 | Nigeria | 23 June 2003 | Turkey | |
| Grafite; Edinaldo Batista Libanio | FW | 4 | 1 | 27 April 2005 | Guatemala | 25 June 2010 | Portugal | |
| Fernando Menegazzo; Fernando Menegazzo | MF | 4 | 0 | 15 November 2006 | Switzerland | 22 August 2007 | Algeria | |
| Naldo; Ronaldo Aparecido Rodrigues | DF | 4 | 0 | 1 June 2007 | England | 22 August 2007 | Algeria | |
| Rafinha; Márcio Rafael Ferreira de Souza | DF | 4 | 0 | 26 March 2008 | Sweden | 13 June 2017 | Australia | |
| Alex; Alex Raphael Meschini | MF | 4 | 0 | 12 October 2008 | Venezuela | 14 October 2009 | Venezuela | |
| André Felipe; André Felipe Ribeiro de Souza | FW | 4 | 0 | 10 August 2010 | United States | 9 February 2011 | France | |
| Juan Jesus * Juan Guilherme Nunes de Jesus | DF | 4 | 0 | 26 May 2012 | Denmark | 9 June 2012 | Argentina | |
| Arouca; Marcos Arouca da Silva | MF | 4 | 0 | 7 September 2012 | South Africa | 6 February 2013 | England | |
| Fábio Santos; Fábio Santos Romeu | DF | 4 | 0 | 19 September 2012 | Argentina | 25 January 2017 | Colombia | |
| Luiz Adriano; Luiz Adriano Sousa da Silva | FW | 4 | 0 | 12 November 2014 | Turkey | 29 March 2015 | Chile | |
| Yan Couto * Yan Bueno Couto | DF | 4 | 0 | 12 October 2023 | Venezuela | 8 June 2024 | Mexico | |
| Abner Vinícius * Abner Vinícius da Silva Santos | DF | 4 | 0 | 10 October 2024 | Chile | 19 November 2024 | Uruguay | |
| Léo Pereira * Leonardo Pereira | DF | 4 | 0 | 26 March 2026 | France | 6 June 2026 | Egypt | |
| Samuel Lino * Samuel Dias Lino | FW | 4 | 2 | 9 September 2025 | Bolivia | 3 October 2026 | India | |
| Jair * Jair Paula da Cunha Filho | DF | 4 | 0 | 25 September 2026 | Australia | 14 November 2026 | Japan | |
| Orlando; Orlando Pereira Pires | DF | 3 | 0 | 8 July 1916 | Chile | 12 July 1916 | Uruguay | |
| Sidney Pullen; Sidney MacKinlay Pullen | MF | 3 | 0 | 8 July 1916 | Chile | 12 July 1916 | Uruguay | |
| Ismael Alvariza; Ismael Alvarizza | FW | 3 | 1 | 11 September 1920 | Chile | 25 September 1920 | Argentina | |
| Castelhano; Cypriano Nunes da Silveira | FW | 3 | 0 | 11 September 1920 | Chile | 25 September 1920 | Argentina | |
| Augusto Sisson; Augusto Maria Sisson Filho | MF | 3 | 0 | 11 September 1920 | Chile | 25 September 1920 | Argentina | |
| Barata; Lair Paulo Barata Ribeiro | DF | 3 | 0 | 2 October 1921 | Argentina | 23 October 1921 | Uruguay | |
| Candiota; Aníbal Médici Machado | FW | 3 | 1 | 2 October 1921 | Argentina | 23 October 1921 | Uruguay | |
| Machado; Ernesto Duarte Machado da Silva | FW | 3 | 2 | 2 October 1921 | Argentina | 23 October 1921 | Uruguay | |
| Orlandinho; Orlando Moreira Torres | FW | 3 | 0 | 2 October 1921 | Argentina | 23 October 1921 | Uruguay | |
| Coelho; José Manoel Ferreira Coelho | FW | 3 | 0 | 11 November 1923 | Paraguay | 9 December 1923 | Argentina | |
| Mário Seixas; Mário Seixas | FW | 3 | 0 | 18 November 1923 | Argentina | 25 November 1923 | Uruguay | |
| Floriano; Floriano Peixoto Corrêa | MF | 3 | 0 | 6 December 1925 | Paraguay | 17 December 1925 | Paraguay | |
| Tuffy Neugen; Tuffy Neujm | GK | 3 | 0 | 6 December 1925 | Paraguay | 25 December 1925 | Argentina | |
| Hélcio; Hélcio de Paiva | DF | 3 | 0 | 13 December 1925 | Argentina | 25 December 1925 | Argentina | |
| Joel; Joel de Oliveira Monteiro | GK | 3 | 0 | 14 July 1930 | Yugoslavia | 17 August 1930 | United States | |
| Fernando Giudicelli; Fernando Rubens Pasi Giudicelli | MF | 3 | 0 | 14 July 1930 | Yugoslavia | 10 August 1930 | Yugoslavia | |
| Preguinho; João Baptista Coelho Netto | FW | 3 | 4 | 14 July 1930 | Yugoslavia | 17 August 1930 | United States | |
| Benedicto; Benedicto de Moraes Menezes | FW | 3 | 1 | 20 July 1930 | Bolivia | 4 December 1932 | Uruguay | |
| Velloso; Osvaldo de Barros Velloso | GK | 3 | 0 | 20 July 1930 | Bolivia | 6 September 1931 | Uruguay | |
| Zé Luiz; José Luiz de Oliveira | DF | 3 | 0 | 20 July 1930 | Bolivia | 17 August 1930 | United States | |
| Carnera; Domingos Spitaletti | DF | 3 | 0 | 27 December 1936 | Peru | 1 February 1937 | Argentina | |
| Batatais; Algisto Lorenzato | GK | 3 | 0 | 5 June 1938 | Poland | 15 January 1939 | Argentina | |
| Walter; Walter de Souza Goulart | GK | 3 | 0 | 12 June 1938 | Czechoslovakia | 16 June 1938 | Italy | |
| Adilson; Adílson Ferreira Antunes | FW | 3 | 1 | 22 January 1939 | Argentina | 25 February 1940 | Argentina | |
| Aymoré Moreira; Aimoré Moreira | GK | 3 | 0 | 18 February 1940 | Argentina | 5 March 1940 | Argentina | |
| Nascimento; Oscar Francisco Nascimento | GK | 3 | 0 | 10 March 1940 | Argentina | 31 March 1940 | Uruguay | |
| Pipi; Serafim Pinto Ribeiro Júnior | FW | 3 | 0 | 17 January 1942 | Argentina | 31 January 1942 | Ecuador | |
| Jorginho; Jorge Ceciliano | FW | 3 | 1 | 21 January 1945 | Colombia | 21 February 1945 | Ecuador | |
| Aleixo Pereira; Aleixo Pereira | MF | 3 | 0 | 23 January 1946 | Uruguay | 3 February 1946 | Chile | |
| Canhotinho; Mílton de Medeiros | FW | 3 | 2 | 4 April 1948 | Uruguay | 17 April 1949 | Colombia | |
| Orlando Pingo de Ouro; Orlando de Azevedo Vianna | MF | 3 | 2 | 17 April 1949 | Colombia | 30 April 1949 | Uruguay | |
| Gérson dos Santos; Gérson dos Santos | MF | 3 | 0 | 16 April 1952 | Uruguay | 21 March 1954 | Paraguay | |
| Néstor; Nestor Alves da Silva | FW | 3 | 0 | 24 January 1956 | Chile | 1 February 1956 | Peru | |
| Zezinho; Moysés Ferreira Alves | FW | 3 | 1 | 1 February 1956 | Peru | 10 February 1956 | Uruguay | |
| Raul Klein; Raul Otávio Klein | MF | 3 | 1 | 1 March 1956 | Chile | 8 March 1956 | Mexico | |
| Sérgio Torres; Sérgio Moacir Torres Nunes | GK | 3 | 0 | 1 March 1956 | Chile | 8 March 1956 | Mexico | |
| Hélio Moreira; Hélio Moreira | MF | 3 | 0 | 12 June 1956 | Paraguay | 24 June 1956 | Uruguay | |
| Tite; Augusto Vieira de Oliveira | MF | 3 | 1 | 11 June 1957 | Portugal | 7 July 1957 | Argentina | |
| Décio Esteves; Décio Esteves da Silva | MF | 3 | 0 | 29 March 1959 | Paraguay | 29 June 1960 | Chile | |
| Tião; Sebastião Pereira dos Santos | FW | 3 | 0 | 5 December 1959 | Paraguay | 19 December 1959 | Ecuador | |
| Goiano; Clenílton Ataíde Cavalcanti | FW | 3 | 0 | 19 December 1959 | Ecuador | 27 December 1959 | Ecuador | |
| Zé Maria; José Maria de Carvalho Sales | MF | 3 | 0 | 19 December 1959 | Ecuador | 27 December 1959 | Ecuador | |
| Irno Lubke; Irno Lubka | GK | 3 | 0 | 6 March 1960 | Mexico | 13 March 1960 | Argentina | |
| Antônio Luiz Soligo; Antônio Luiz Soligo | DF | 3 | 0 | 6 March 1960 | Mexico | 13 March 1960 | Argentina | |
| Jurandir; Jurandir Gastón dos Santos | FW | 3 | 0 | 10 March 1960 | Costa Rica | 15 March 1960 | Mexico | |
| Suly; Suly Cabral Machado | GK | 3 | 0 | 15 March 1960 | Mexico | 20 March 1960 | Argentina | |
| Germano; José Germano de Salles | MF | 3 | 1 | 6 May 1962 | Portugal | 7 September 1965 | Uruguay | |
| Fernando Cônsul; Fernando Cônsul Fernandes | FW | 3 | 2 | 14 March 1963 | Colombia | 27 March 1963 | Ecuador | |
| Célio Taveira; Célio Taveira Filho | FW | 3 | 0 | 6 June 1965 | West Germany | 18 May 1966 | Wales | |
| Adhemar Bianchini; Ademar Bianchini de Carvalho | FW | 3 | 0 | 17 June 1965 | Algeria | 30 June 1965 | Sweden | |
| Volmir; Volmir Francisco de Souza | MF | 3 | 0 | 17 April 1966 | Chile | 25 June 1967 | Uruguay | |
| Nado; José Rinaldo Tasso Lassalvia | FW | 3 | 0 | 15 May 1966 | Chile | 14 December 1968 | West Germany | |
| Sebastião Leônidas; Sebastião Leônidas | DF | 3 | 0 | 18 May 1966 | Wales | 7 August 1968 | Argentina | |
| Hilton Oliveira; Hílton José de Oliveira | MF | 3 | 0 | 25 June 1967 | Uruguay | 1 July 1967 | Uruguay | |
| Moreira; Ismael Moreira Braga | DF | 3 | 0 | 19 September 1967 | Chile | 6 November 1968 | World XI | |
| Ado; Eduardo Roberto Stinghen | GK | 3 | 0 | 4 March 1970 | Argentina | 30 September 1970 | Mexico | |
| Rogério Hetmanek; Rogério Hetmanek | MF | 3 | 0 | 12 April 1970 | Paraguay | 4 October 1970 | Chile | |
| Enéas; Enéas de Camargo | FW | 3 | 1 | 31 March 1974 | Mexico | 28 April 1976 | Uruguay | |
| Neca; Antônio Rodrigues Filho | MF | 3 | 1 | 19 May 1976 | Argentina | 9 June 1976 | Paraguay | |
| Pintinho; Carlos Alberto Gomes | MF | 3 | 0 | 20 March 1977 | Paraguay | 31 October 1979 | Paraguay | |
| Mauro Pastor; Mauro Rodrigues dos Santos | DF | 3 | 0 | 8 June 1980 | Mexico | 29 June 1980 | Poland | |
| Paulo Sérgio; Paulo Sérgio de Oliveira Lima | GK | 3 | 0 | 15 May 1981 | France | 27 May 1982 | Republic of Ireland | |
| Vítor; Vítor Luiz Pereira da Silva | MF | 3 | 0 | 15 May 1981 | France | 21 March 1982 | West Germany | |
| Carlos Alberto Borges; Carlos Alberto Borges | MF | 3 | 0 | 8 June 1983 | Portugal | 17 June 1983 | Switzerland | |
| Tato; Carlos Alberto de Araújo Prestes | MF | 3 | 0 | 10 June 1984 | England | 8 June 1985 | Chile | |
| Dida; Marcos Aurélio Moraes dos Santos | DF | 3 | 0 | 12 March 1986 | West Germany | 1 April 1986 | Peru | |
| Edivaldo; Edivaldo Martins da Fonseca | MF | 3 | 0 | 17 April 1986 | Finland | 23 July 1989 | Japan | |
| Zé Carlos; José Carlos da Costa Araújo | GK | 3 | 0 | 13 July 1988 | Saudi Arabia | 23 July 1989 | Japan | |
| Zé do Carmo; José do Carmo Silva Filho | MF | 3 | 1 | 12 October 1988 | Belgium | 10 May 1989 | Peru | |
| Vivinho; Welves Dias Marcelino | MF | 3 | 1 | 15 March 1989 | Ecuador | 10 May 1989 | Peru | |
| Bobô; Raimundo Nonato Tavares da Silva | MF | 3 | 0 | 12 April 1989 | Paraguay | 24 May 1989 | Peru | |
| Zé Carlos; José Carlos Conceição dos Santos | MF | 3 | 0 | 10 May 1989 | Peru | 8 June 1989 | Portugal | |
| Nonato; Raimundo Nonato da Silva | DF | 3 | 0 | 6 June 1993 | United States | 13 June 1993 | England | |
| Rodrigo Chagas; Rodrigo José Queiroz Chagas | MF | 3 | 0 | 9 August 1995 | Japan | 8 November 1995 | Argentina | |
| Ricardinho; Ricardo Alexandre dos Santos | MF | 3 | 0 | 18 December 1996 | Bosnia and Herzegovina | 3 March 2001 | United States | |
| Rodrigo Fabri; Rodrigo Fabri | MF | 3 | 1 | 18 December 1996 | Bosnia and Herzegovina | 7 December 1997 | South Africa | |
| Jackson; Jackson Coelho Silva | MF | 3 | 0 | 23 September 1998 | FR Yugoslavia | 18 November 1998 | Russia | |
| Rogério; Rogério Fidélis Régis | MF | 3 | 0 | 23 September 1998 | FR Yugoslavia | 31 March 1999 | Japan | |
| Fábio Júnior; Fábio Júnior Pereira | FW | 3 | 0 | 14 October 1998 | Ecuador | 31 March 1999 | Japan | |
| Rafael Scheidt; Rafael Felipe Scheidt | DF | 3 | 0 | 31 March 1999 | Japan | 7 September 1999 | Argentina | |
| Marcos Paulo; Marcos Paulo Alves | MF | 3 | 1 | 8 June 1999 | Netherlands | 23 February 2000 | Thailand | |
| Cláudio Caçapa; Cláudio Roberto da Silva | DF | 3 | 0 | 23 February 2000 | Thailand | 9 June 2001 | Australia | |
| Émerson; Émerson Carvalho da Silva | DF | 3 | 0 | 23 May 2000 | Wales | 3 September 2000 | Bolivia | |
| Alessandro; Alessandro da Conceição Pinto | DF | 3 | 0 | 25 April 2001 | Peru | 9 August 2001 | Panama | |
| Magno Alves; Magno Alves de Araújo | FW | 3 | 0 | 2 June 2001 | Canada | 9 June 2001 | Australia | |
| Paulo César; Paulo César Arruda Parente | DF | 3 | 0 | 31 January 2002 | Bolivia | 7 March 2002 | Iceland | |
| Ilan; Ilan Araújo Dall'Igna | FW | 3 | 0 | 19 June 2003 | Cameroon | 23 June 2003 | Turkey | |
| Magrão; Márcio Rodrigues | MF | 3 | 0 | 18 August 2004 | Haiti | 27 April 2005 | Guatemala | |
| Daniel Carvalho; Daniel da Silva Carvalho | MF | 3 | 1 | 16 August 2006 | Norway | 15 November 2006 | Switzerland | |
| Helton; Hélton da Silva Arruda | GK | 3 | 0 | 15 November 2006 | Switzerland | 1 June 2007 | England | |
| Dudu * Eduardo Pereira Rodrigues | MF | 3 | 1 | 10 November 2011 | Gabon | 25 January 2017 | Colombia | |
| Bruno Uvini; Bruno Uvini Bortolança | DF | 3 | 0 | 26 May 2012 | Denmark | 9 June 2012 | Argentina | |
| Wellington Nem; Wellington Silva Sanches Aguiar | MF | 3 | 0 | 26 May 2012 | Denmark | 19 September 2012 | Argentina | |
| Rafael Cabral * Rafael Cabral Barbosa | GK | 3 | 0 | 30 May 2012 | United States | 9 June 2012 | Argentina | |
| Diego Cavalieri; Diego Cavalieri | GK | 3 | 0 | 21 November 2012 | Argentina | 15 October 2013 | Zambia | |
| Josef de Souza; Josef de Souza Dias | MF | 3 | 0 | 14 October 2014 | Japan | 29 March 2015 | Chile | |
| Rony * Ronielson da Silva Barbosa | FW | 3 | 0 | 25 March 2023 | Morocco | 20 June 2023 | Senegal | |
| Alexsandro * Alexsandro Victor de Souza Ribeiro | DF | 3 | 0 | 5 June 2025 | Ecuador | 9 September 2025 | Bolivia | |
| Matheuzinho * Matheus França Silva | DF | 3 | 0 | 25 September 2026 | Australia | 3 October 2026 | India | |
| Mauro Júnior * Mauro Jaqueson Júnior Ferreira dos Santos | DF | 3 | 0 | 25 September 2026 | Australia | 3 October 2026 | India | |
| Oswaldo Gomes; Oswaldo Gomes | FW | 2 | 0 | 20 September 1914 | Argentina | 27 September 1914 | Argentina | |
| Barthô; Luiz Bartholomeu de Souza e Silva Filho | FW | 2 | 0 | 20 September 1914 | Argentina | 27 September 1914 | Argentina | |
| Mário Pernambuco; Mário Pernambuco | MF | 2 | 0 | 20 September 1914 | Argentina | 27 September 1914 | Argentina | |
| Mimi Sodré; Benjamin de Almeida Sodré | FW | 2 | 1 | 12 July 1916 | Uruguay | 18 July 1916 | Uruguay | |
| Antonio Picagli; Antônio Picagli | MF | 2 | 0 | 7 October 1917 | Uruguay | 1 June 1919 | Argentina | |
| Constantino Mollitsas; Constantino Mollitsas | FW | 2 | 0 | 11 September 1920 | Chile | 25 September 1920 | Argentina | |
| De María; João de Maria | DF | 2 | 0 | 11 September 1920 | Chile | 18 September 1920 | Uruguay | |
| Japonês; Adhemar Martins | DF | 2 | 0 | 18 September 1920 | Uruguay | 25 September 1920 | Argentina | |
| Frederico Pinheiro; Frederico Pinheiro | FW | 2 | 0 | 12 October 1921 | Paraguay | 23 October 1921 | Uruguay | |
| Gamba; Alberto Gambarotta | FW | 2 | 2 | 22 October 1922 | Argentina | 29 October 1922 | Paraguay | |
| Grané; Pedro Grané | DF | 2 | 0 | 22 October 1922 | Argentina | 1 August 1930 | France | |
| Affonso Mesquita; Affonso Mesquita | GK | 2 | 0 | 22 October 1922 | Argentina | 29 October 1922 | Paraguay | |
| Pamplona; Estanislau de Figueiredo Pamplona Júnior | MF | 2 | 0 | 17 December 1925 | Paraguay | 25 December 1925 | Argentina | |
| Russinho; Moacyr Siqueira de Queiroz | FW | 2 | 1 | 20 July 1930 | Bolivia | 10 August 1930 | Yugoslavia | |
| Benevenuto; Humberto de Araújo Benevenuto | MF | 2 | 0 | 10 August 1930 | Yugoslavia | 17 August 1930 | United States | |
| Walter; Walter Rodrigues Fortes | MF | 2 | 0 | 6 September 1931 | Uruguay | 4 December 1932 | Uruguay | |
| Armandinho; Armando Carezzato dos Santos | FW | 2 | 1 | 27 May 1934 | Spain | 3 June 1934 | Yugoslavia | |
| Luiz Luz; Luiz dos Santos Luz | DF | 2 | 0 | 27 May 1934 | Spain | 3 June 1934 | Yugoslavia | |
| Pedrosa; Roberto Gomes Pedroza | GK | 2 | 0 | 27 May 1934 | Spain | 3 June 1934 | Yugoslavia | |
| Sylvio Hoffmann; Sylvio Hoffmann Mazzi | DF | 2 | 0 | 27 May 1934 | Spain | 3 June 1934 | Yugoslavia | |
| Waldemar de Brito; Waldemar de Britto | FW | 2 | 1 | 27 May 1934 | Spain | 3 June 1934 | Yugoslavia | |
| Rei; José Fontana | GK | 2 | 0 | 27 December 1936 | Peru | 13 January 1937 | Paraguay | |
| Cardeal; Sezefredo Ernesto da Costa | FW | 2 | 0 | 30 January 1937 | Argentina | 1 February 1937 | Argentina | |
| Del Nero; José Del Nero | MF | 2 | 0 | 18 February 1940 | Argentina | 25 February 1940 | Argentina | |
| Paulo Flôrencio; Paulo Florêncio | FW | 2 | 0 | 31 January 1942 | Ecuador | 5 February 1942 | Paraguay | |
| Isaías; Isaías Benedito da Silva | FW | 2 | 1 | 14 May 1944 | Uruguay | 18 May 1944 | Uruguay | |
| Maneco; Manuel Anselmo da Silva | FW | 2 | 0 | 29 March 1947 | Uruguay | 1 April 1947 | Uruguay | |
| Adãozinho; Adão Nunes Dornelles | FW | 2 | 0 | 4 April 1948 | Uruguay | 11 April 1948 | Uruguay | |
| Oswaldo Baliza; Osvaldo Alfredo da Silva | GK | 2 | 0 | 17 April 1949 | Colombia | 20 April 1952 | Chile | |
| Haroldo; Haroldo Rodrigues de Magalhães Castro | DF | 2 | 0 | 1 March 1953 | Bolivia | 1 April 1953 | Paraguay | |
| Vasconcelos; Walter Vasconcelos Fernandes | MF | 2 | 0 | 20 September 1955 | Chile | 17 November 1955 | Paraguay | |
| José Calazans; José Alves Calazans | FW | 2 | 0 | 12 June 1956 | Paraguay | 17 September 1959 | Chile | |
| Romeiro; José Romeiro Cardoso Neto | MF | 2 | 0 | 12 June 1956 | Paraguay | 17 June 1956 | Paraguay | |
| Pagão; Paulo César de Araújo | FW | 2 | 0 | 11 June 1957 | Portugal | 16 June 1957 | Portugal | |
| Henrique; Henrique dos Santos | DF | 2 | 0 | 15 September 1957 | Chile | 18 September 1957 | Chile | |
| Samuel Mattos; Samuel Pereira de Mattos | FW | 2 | 1 | 15 September 1957 | Chile | 18 September 1957 | Chile | |
| Nelinho; Agnelo Correia dos Santos | DF | 2 | 0 | 15 September 1957 | Chile | 18 September 1957 | Chile | |
| Otoney; Otoney Raul Veloso Oliveira | FW | 2 | 0 | 15 September 1957 | Chile | 18 September 1957 | Chile | |
| Pequeno; Ildefonso Rocha Lima | DF | 2 | 0 | 15 September 1957 | Chile | 18 September 1957 | Chile | |
| Periperí; Hamílton Ferreira Leal | GK | 2 | 0 | 15 September 1957 | Chile | 18 September 1957 | Chile | |
| Pinguela; João Paulo de Oliveira | DF | 2 | 0 | 15 September 1957 | Chile | 18 September 1957 | Chile | |
| Raimundinho; Raimundo Borges da Cruz | FW | 2 | 0 | 15 September 1957 | Chile | 18 September 1957 | Chile | |
| Teotônio; Teotônio Pereira da Silva | MF | 2 | 0 | 15 September 1957 | Chile | 18 September 1957 | Chile | |
| Wassil; Wassil Vieira Barbosa | MF | 2 | 0 | 15 September 1957 | Chile | 18 September 1957 | Chile | |
| Gilberto Andrade; Gilberto Garcia de Andrade | MF | 2 | 1 | 6 March 1960 | Mexico | 13 March 1960 | Argentina | |
| Geraldo Scotto; Geraldo Scotto | DF | 2 | 0 | 26 May 1960 | Argentina | 29 May 1960 | Argentina | |
| Roberto Frojuello; Roberto Fernando Frojuello | FW | 2 | 0 | 26 May 1960 | Argentina | 29 May 1960 | Argentina | |
| Écio Capovilla; Écio Capovilla | MF | 2 | 0 | 29 June 1960 | Chile | 3 July 1960 | Paraguay | |
| Valdemar Carabina; Valdemar Figueira de Melo | DF | 2 | 0 | 29 June 1961 | Paraguay | 7 September 1965 | Uruguay | |
| Amaury Silva; Amauri da Silva | FW | 2 | 0 | 24 March 1963 | Argentina | 27 March 1963 | Ecuador | |
| Amauri; Amaury Alves Horta | MF | 2 | 1 | 24 March 1963 | Argentina | 19 December 1968 | Yugoslavia | |
| Silas; Silas Ferreira de Sousa | GK | 2 | 0 | 27 March 1963 | Ecuador | 31 March 1963 | Bolivia | |
| Ditão; Geraldo de Freitas Nascimento | DF | 2 | 0 | 4 July 1965 | Soviet Union | 28 July 1968 | Paraguay | |
| Ademar Pantera; Ademar Miranda Júnior | FW | 2 | 0 | 7 September 1965 | Uruguay | 21 November 1965 | Soviet Union | |
| Altemir; Altemir Marques da Cruz | DF | 2 | 0 | 17 April 1966 | Chile | 20 April 1966 | Chile | |
| Arlindo Lau; Arlindo Lau | GK | 2 | 0 | 17 April 1966 | Chile | 20 April 1966 | Chile | |
| Ari Ercílio; Ary Ercílio Barbosa | DF | 2 | 0 | 17 April 1966 | Chile | 20 April 1966 | Chile | |
| Babá; Santino Quarth Irmão | FW | 2 | 0 | 17 April 1966 | Chile | 20 April 1966 | Chile | |
| Cléo; Cleo Muratore de Souza | MF | 2 | 0 | 17 April 1966 | Chile | 20 April 1966 | Chile | |
| Davi; David Benedito Magalhães | MF | 2 | 0 | 17 April 1966 | Chile | 20 April 1966 | Chile | |
| João Severiano; João Carlos da Silva Severiano | MF | 2 | 2 | 17 April 1966 | Chile | 20 April 1966 | Chile | |
| Saulzinho; Saul Santos Silva | FW | 2 | 0 | 17 April 1966 | Chile | 20 April 1966 | Chile | |
| Sérgio Lopes; Sérgio Gonçalves Lopes | MF | 2 | 0 | 17 April 1966 | Chile | 20 April 1966 | Chile | |
| Leôncio Vieira; Leôncio Abel Alves Vieira | FW | 2 | 0 | 17 April 1966 | Chile | 20 April 1966 | Chile | |
| Áureo Malinverni; Áureo Agostinho Arruda Malinverne | DF | 2 | 0 | 17 April 1966 | Chile | 20 April 1966 | Chile | |
| Murilo; Paulo Murilo Frederico Ferreira | DF | 2 | 0 | 18 May 1966 | Wales | 7 August 1968 | Argentina | |
| Parada; Antônio Parada Neto | MF | 2 | 0 | 19 May 1966 | Chile | 5 June 1966 | Poland | |
| Oldair; Oldair Barchi | MF | 2 | 0 | 8 June 1966 | Peru | 11 August 1968 | Argentina | |
| Edu Coimbra; Eduardo Antunes Coimbra | MF | 2 | 0 | 25 June 1967 | Uruguay | 28 June 1967 | Uruguay | |
| Carlos Roberto; Carlos Roberto de Carvalho | MF | 2 | 0 | 17 July 1968 | Peru | 7 August 1968 | Argentina | |
| Alberto; Alberto Silveira | GK | 2 | 0 | 3 November 1968 | Mexico | 17 December 1968 | Yugoslavia | |
| Nei Conceição; Nei da Conceição Moreira | MF | 2 | 0 | 4 October 1970 | Chile | 14 July 1971 | Czechoslovakia | |
| Eurico; Eurico Pedro de Faria | DF | 2 | 0 | 18 July 1971 | Yugoslavia | 31 July 1971 | Argentina | |
| Chiquinho Pastor; Francisco Jesus Fernandes | DF | 2 | 0 | 27 May 1973 | Bolivia | 3 June 1973 | Algeria | |
| Renato; Renato Cunha Valle | GK | 2 | 0 | 3 June 1973 | Algeria | 13 June 1973 | Austria | |
| Alfredo; Alfredo Mostarda Filho | DF | 2 | 0 | 31 March 1974 | Mexico | 6 July 1974 | Poland | |
| Caçapava; Luís Carlos Melo Lopes | MF | 2 | 0 | 1 December 1976 | Soviet Union | 20 February 1977 | Colombia | |
| Tarciso; José Tarciso de Souza | MF | 2 | 0 | 1 April 1978 | France | 24 October 1979 | Paraguay | |
| Zezé; Antônio José da Silva Gouveia | MF | 2 | 0 | 17 May 1979 | Paraguay | 31 October 1979 | Paraguay | |
| Juary; Juary Jorge dos Santos Filho | FW | 2 | 0 | 26 July 1979 | Bolivia | 2 August 1979 | Argentina | |
| Marolla; Fiodermundo Marolla Júnior | GK | 2 | 0 | 30 October 1980 | Paraguay | 14 February 1981 | Ecuador | |
| César; Júlio César Coelho de Moraes | FW | 2 | 0 | 15 May 1981 | France | 19 May 1981 | West Germany | |
| Perivaldo; Perivaldo Lúcio Dantas | DF | 2 | 0 | 8 July 1981 | Spain | 3 March 1982 | Czechoslovakia | |
| Betão; Roberto Tailor dos Santos Moraes | DF | 2 | 0 | 8 June 1983 | Portugal | 12 June 1983 | Wales | |
| Assis; Benedito Assis da Silva | MF | 2 | 0 | 10 June 1984 | England | 21 June 1984 | Uruguay | |
| Pires; José Sebastião Pires Neto | MF | 2 | 0 | 10 June 1984 | England | 17 June 1984 | Argentina | |
| Marquinho Carioca; Marco Antônio Rodrigues Henriques | FW | 2 | 0 | 17 June 1984 | Argentina | 21 June 1984 | Uruguay | |
| Marinho; Mário José Emiliano dos Reis | MF | 2 | 1 | 12 March 1986 | West Germany | 17 April 1986 | Finland | |
| Sídney; Sidney José Tobias | FW | 2 | 0 | 12 March 1986 | West Germany | 16 March 1986 | Hungary | |
| Régis; Reginaldo Paes Leme Ferreira | GK | 2 | 0 | 28 May 1987 | Finland | 1 June 1987 | Israel | |
| Sérgio Araújo; Sérgio Araújo de Melo | MF | 2 | 0 | 9 December 1987 | Chile | 12 December 1987 | West Germany | |
| Zé Teodoro; José Teodoro Bonfim Queiroz | DF | 2 | 0 | 9 December 1987 | Chile | 12 December 1987 | West Germany | |
| Uidemar; Uidemar Pessoa de Oliveira | MF | 2 | 0 | 12 December 1987 | West Germany | 15 March 1989 | Ecuador | |
| Marcelo Djian; Marcelo Kiremitdjian | DF | 2 | 0 | 10 May 1989 | Peru | 15 April 1992 | Finland | |
| Odair Patriarca; Odair Patriarca | DF | 2 | 0 | 12 December 1990 | Mexico | 28 May 1991 | Bulgaria | |
| Dener; Dener Augusto de Souza | MF | 2 | 0 | 27 March 1991 | Argentina | 28 May 1991 | Bulgaria | |
| Sílvio; Sílvio César Ferreira da Costa | FW | 2 | 0 | 15 July 1991 | Ecuador | 17 July 1991 | Argentina | |
| Vítor; Claudemir Vítor | DF | 2 | 0 | 25 November 1992 | Uruguay | 17 March 1993 | Poland | |
| Leandro Machado; Leandro Machado | FW | 2 | 1 | 12 January 1996 | Canada | 21 January 1996 | Mexico | |
| Marcelinho Paulista; Marcelo José de Souza | MF | 2 | 0 | 27 March 1996 | Ghana | 22 May 1996 | Croatia | |
| César Prates; César Luiz Prates | DF | 2 | 0 | 13 November 1996 | Cameroon | 2 April 1997 | Chile | |
| Oséas; Oséas Reis dos Santos | FW | 2 | 0 | 13 November 1996 | Cameroon | 18 December 1996 | Bosnia and Herzegovina | |
| Paulo Nunes; Arílson de Paula Nunes | FW | 2 | 0 | 3 June 1997 | France | 29 June 1997 | Bolivia | |
| Djair; Djair Kaye de Brito | MF | 2 | 0 | 5 June 1999 | Netherlands | 8 June 1999 | Netherlands | |
| César; César Aparecido Rodrigues | DF | 2 | 0 | 28 March 2001 | Ecuador | 25 April 2001 | Peru | |
| Adriano Gabiru; Carlos Adriano de Souza Vieira | MF | 2 | 0 | 11 June 2003 | Nigeria | 19 June 2003 | Cameroon | |
| Maurinho; Mauro Sérgio Viriato Mendes | DF | 2 | 0 | 21 June 2003 | United States | 23 June 2003 | Turkey | |
| Nádson; Nádson Rodrigues de Souza | FW | 2 | 0 | 13 July 2003 | Mexico | 23 July 2003 | United States | |
| Thiago Motta; Thiago Motta | MF | 2 | 0 | 13 July 2003 | Mexico | 15 July 2003 | Honduras | |
| Alex Silva; Alex Sandro da Silva | DF | 2 | 0 | 4 July 2007 | Ecuador | 22 August 2007 | Algeria | |
| Edu Dracena; Eduardo Luís Abonízio de Souza | DF | 2 | 0 | 9 September 2007 | United States | 12 September 2007 | Mexico | |
| Richarlyson; Richarlyson Barbosa Felisbino | DF | 2 | 0 | 6 February 2008 | Republic of Ireland | 26 March 2008 | Sweden | |
| Juan; Juan Maldonado Jaimez Júnior | DF | 2 | 0 | 7 September 2008 | Chile | 10 September 2008 | Bolivia | |
| Jucilei; Jucilei da Silva | MF | 2 | 0 | 10 August 2010 | United States | 17 November 2010 | Argentina | |
| Wesley; Wesley Lopes Beltrame | MF | 2 | 0 | 7 October 2010 | Iran | 11 October 2010 | Ukraine | |
| Fabio; Fábio Pereira da Silva | DF | 2 | 0 | 7 October 2011 | Costa Rica | 10 November 2011 | Gabon | |
| Bruno César; Bruno César Zanaki | MF | 2 | 0 | 10 November 2011 | Gabon | 14 November 2011 | Egypt | |
| Kléber; Kléber Laube Pinheiro | FW | 2 | 0 | 10 November 2011 | Gabon | 14 November 2011 | Egypt | |
| Rafael; Rafael Pereira da Silva | DF | 2 | 0 | 26 May 2012 | Denmark | 9 June 2012 | Argentina | |
| Lucas Marques; Lucas Rios Marques | DF | 2 | 0 | 19 September 2012 | Argentina | 21 November 2012 | Argentina | |
| Leandro Castán; Leandro Castán da Silva | DF | 2 | 0 | 16 October 2012 | Japan | 14 November 2012 | Colombia | |
| Diego Costa; Diego da Silva Costa | FW | 2 | 0 | 21 March 2013 | Italy | 25 March 2013 | Russia | |
| Osvaldo * Osvaldo Lourenço Filho | MF | 2 | 0 | 6 April 2013 | Bolivia | 24 April 2013 | Chile | |
| Marcos Rocha * Marcos Luís Rocha Aquino | DF | 2 | 0 | 24 April 2013 | Chile | 7 September 2013 | Australia | |
| Felipe Anderson * Felipe Ânderson Pereira Gomes | MF | 2 | 0 | 7 June 2015 | Mexico | 23 March 2019 | Panama | |
| Marcelo Grohe; Marcelo Grohe | GK | 2 | 0 | 5 September 2015 | Costa Rica | 8 September 2015 | United States | |
| Rafinha; Rafael Alcântara do Nascimento | MF | 2 | 1 | 5 September 2015 | Costa Rica | 8 September 2015 | United States | |
| Luan * Luan Guilherme de Jesus Vieira | FW | 2 | 0 | 25 January 2017 | Colombia | 31 August 2017 | Ecuador | |
| Pedro Geromel; Pedro Tonon Geromel | DF | 2 | 0 | 25 January 2017 | Colombia | 23 March 2018 | Russia | |
| Rodriguinho; Rodrigo Eduardo Costa Marinho | MF | 2 | 0 | 25 January 2017 | Colombia | 13 June 2017 | Australia | |
| Jemerson * Jemerson de Jesus Nascimento | DF | 2 | 0 | 13 June 2017 | Australia | 10 November 2017 | Japan | |
| Felipe; Felipe Augusto de Almeida Monteiro | DF | 2 | 0 | 11 September 2018 | El Salvador | 9 October 2020 | Bolivia | |
| Pablo * Pablo do Nascimento Castro | DF | 2 | 0 | 12 October 2018 | Saudi Arabia | 20 November 2018 | Cameroon | |
| Bruno Henrique * Bruno Henrique Pinto | MF | 2 | 0 | 6 September 2019 | Colombia | 10 September 2019 | Peru | |
| Edenilson * Edenílson Andrade dos Santos | MF | 2 | 0 | 9 September 2021 | Peru | 14 October 2021 | Uruguay | |
| Lucas Veríssimo * Lucas Veríssimo da Silva | DF | 2 | 0 | 9 September 2021 | Peru | 14 October 2021 | Uruguay | |
| Vitor Roque * Vítor Hugo Roque Ferreira | FW | 2 | 0 | 25 March 2023 | Morocco | 18 November 2025 | Tunisia | |
| Ayrton Lucas * Ayrton Lucas Dantas de Medeiros | DF | 2 | 0 | 17 June 2023 | Guinea | 20 June 2023 | Senegal | |
| Malcom * Malcom Filipe Silva de Oliveira | MF | 2 | 0 | 17 June 2023 | Guinea | 20 June 2023 | Senegal | |
| Pepê * Eduardo Gabriel Aquino Cossa | MF | 2 | 0 | 16 November 2023 | Colombia | 8 June 2024 | Mexico | |
| Evanilson * Francisco Evanílson de Lima Barbosa | FW | 2 | 0 | 8 June 2024 | Mexico | 6 July 2024 | Uruguay | |
| Léo Ortiz * Leonardo Rech Ortiz | DF | 2 | 0 | 20 March 2025 | Colombia | 25 March 2025 | Argentina | |
| Vitinho * Victor Alexander da Silva | DF | 2 | 0 | 9 September 2025 | Bolivia | 10 October 2025 | South Korea | |
| Paulo Henrique * Paulo Henrique de Oliveira Alves | DF | 2 | 1 | 10 October 2025 | South Korea | 14 October 2025 | Japan | |
| Hugo Souza * Hugo de Souza Nogueira | GK | 2 | 0 | 14 October 2025 | Japan | 25 September 2026 | Australia | |
| Vitor Reis * Vitor de Oliveira Nunes dos Reis | DF | 2 | 0 | 25 September 2026 | Australia | 29 September 2026 | Australia | |
| Arthur Dias * Arthur dos Santos Barbosa Dias | DF | 2 | 0 | 29 September 2026 | Australia | 3 October 2026 | India | |
| Breno Bidon * Breno de Souza Bidon | MF | 2 | 0 | 29 September 2026 | Australia | 3 October 2026 | India | |
| Matheus Martinelli * Matheus Martinelli Lima | MF | 2 | 0 | 29 September 2026 | Australia | 3 October 2026 | India | |
| Gabriel Bontempo * Gabriel Morais Silva Bontempo | MF | 2 | 0 | 29 September 2026 | Australia | 3 October 2026 | India | |
| Pedro Morisco * Pedro Luccas Morisco da Silva | GK | 2 | 0 | 3 October 2026 | India | 14 November 2026 | Japan | |

== See also ==
- List of Brazil international footballers
- List of Brazil international footballers (6–19 caps)
- List of Brazil international footballers (1 cap)
