= 1959 South American Championship (Ecuador) squads =

List of footballers

The following are the squad lists for the countries that played in the 1959 South American Championship held in Ecuador, the second edition of the tournament contested twice in a year.

The participating countries were Argentina, Brazil, Chile, Ecuador, Paraguay and Uruguay. Unlike the previous edition held that same year in Argentina, the participant teams brought reserve squads to the competition. Moreover, Brazilian roster included players from teams from Pernambuco state only, while Argentina brought younger or reserve players.

The teams played in a single round-robin tournament, earning two points for a win, one point for a draw, and zero points for a loss.

== Argentina ==
Head Coach: (Argentina) José Manuel Moreno

No.	Pos.	Player	Date of birth (age)	Caps	Goals	Club
	DF	Norberto Anido	9 February 1933 (aged 26)	1	0	(Argentine Football Association) Racing Club
	DF	Carlos Arredondo	26 October 1933 (aged 26)	0	0	(Argentine Football Association) Huracán
	FW	Raúl Belén	1 July 1931 (aged 28)	7	3	(Argentine Football Association) Racing Club
	DF	Rodolfo Betinotti	7 October 1932 (aged 27)	0	0	(Argentine Football Association) Atlanta
	FW	Norberto Boggio	11 August 1934 (aged 25)	3	0	(Argentine Football Association) San Lorenzo
	MF	José Carbone	15 September 1930 (aged 29)	0	0	(Argentine Football Association) Independiente
	GK	Néstor Errea	27 April 1939 (aged 20)	0	0	(Argentine Football Association) Atlanta
	FW	Héctor Facundo	2 November 1937 (aged 22)	1	0	(Argentine Football Association) San Lorenzo
	FW	Omar García	12 September 1939 (aged 20)	0	0	(Argentine Football Association) San Lorenzo
	MF	Carlos Griguol	4 September 1934 (aged 25)	0	0	(Argentine Football Association) Atlanta
	MF	Juan Héctor Guidi	14 July 1930 (aged 29)	18	0	(Argentine Football Association) Lanús
	DF	Juan Francisco Lombardo	11 June 1925 (aged 34)	36	0	(Argentine Football Association) Boca Juniors
	MF	Eliseo Mouriño	3 June 1927 (aged 32)	23	0	(Argentine Football Association) Boca Juniors
	DF	Juan Carlos Murúa	18 July 1935 (aged 24)	6	0	(Argentine Football Association) Racing Club
	GK	Jorge Negri	30 November 1932 (aged 27)	7	0	(Argentine Football Association) Racing Club
	FW	Juan José Pizzuti	9 May 1927 (aged 32)	7	3	(Argentine Football Association) Racing Club
	MF	Antonio Rattín	16 May 1937 (aged 22)	1	0	(Argentine Football Association) Boca Juniors
	FW	Juan José Rodríguez	11 January 1937 (aged 22)	4	0	(Argentine Football Association) Boca Juniors
	MF	Miguel Ángel Ruíz	10 January 1934 (aged 25)	1	0	(Argentine Football Association) San Lorenzo
	FW	José Sanfilippo	4 May 1935 (aged 24)	8	3	(Argentine Football Association) San Lorenzo
	FW	Rubén Sosa	14 November 1936 (aged 23)	4	4	(Argentine Football Association) Racing Club

== Brazil ==
Head Coach: (Brazil) Gentil Cardoso

No.	Pos.	Player	Date of birth (age)	Caps	Goals	Club
	DF	Biu	27 March 1936 (aged 23)	0	0	(Brazilian Football Confederation) Santa Cruz
	DF	Bria	12 May 1928 (aged 30)	0	0	(Brazilian Football Confederation) Sport Recife
	DF	Clóvis	28 August 1937 (aged 22)	0	0	(Brazilian Football Confederation) Santa Cruz
	DF	Édson	19 March 1933 (aged 26)	13	0	(Brazilian Football Confederation) Sport Recife
	FW	Elcy	5 December 1938 (aged 21)	0	0	(Brazilian Football Confederation) Sport Recife
	FW	Elias	20 February 1931 (aged 28)	0	0	(Brazilian Football Confederation) Náutico
	MF	Fernando		0	0	(Brazilian Football Confederation) Náutico
	FW	Geraldo	6 March 1936 (aged 23)	0	0	(Brazilian Football Confederation) Náutico
	DF	Geroldo	14 March 1933 (aged 26)	0	0	(Brazilian Football Confederation) Santa Cruz
	DF	Givaldo	12 March 1935 (aged 24)	0	0	(Brazilian Football Confederation) Náutico
	FW	Goiano	24 September 1935 (aged 24)	0	0	(Brazilian Football Confederation) Santa Cruz
	GK	Moacir	27 March 1921 (aged 38)	20	0	(Brazilian Football Confederation) Vasco da Gama
	FW	Paulo	1 November 1930 (aged 29)	0	0	(Brazilian Football Confederation) Náutico
	DF	Servílio	25 September 1929 (aged 30)	0	0	(Brazilian Football Confederation) Santa Cruz
	FW	Tião	11 May 1936 (aged 23)	0	0	(Brazilian Football Confederation) Santa Cruz
	MF	Traçaia	6 August 1933 (aged 26)	0	0	(Brazilian Football Confederation) Sport Recife
	GK	Valter	25 July 1935 (aged 24)	0	0	(Brazilian Football Confederation) Santa Cruz
	GK	Waldemar	4 March 1936 (aged 23)	0	0	(Brazilian Football Confederation) Náutico
	MF	Zé Maria	3 December 1931 (aged 28)	0	0	(Brazilian Football Confederation) Sport Recife
	MF	Zé de Mello	7 January 1934 (aged 25)	0	0	(Brazilian Football Confederation) Santa Cruz
	MF	Zequinha	6 July 1938 (aged 21)	0	0	(Brazilian Football Confederation) Náutico

== Ecuador ==
Head Coach: (Uruguay) Juan López Fontana

No.	Pos.	Player	Date of birth (age)	Caps	Goals	Club
	DF	Francisco Almeida	4 October 1936 (aged 23)	0	0	(Ecuadorian Football Federation) España
	FW	Carlos Altamirano		0	0	(Ecuadorian Football Federation) Everest
	DF	Raúl Argüello	1 May 1936 (aged 23)	6	0	(Ecuadorian Football Federation) Everest
	FW	Nelson Aurea		0	0	(Ecuadorian Football Federation) Patria
	MF	Alberto Cruz Ávila	2 August 1937 (aged 22)	0	0	(Ecuadorian Football Federation) Emelec
	FW	José Balseca	19 August 1933 (aged 26)	15	0	(Ecuadorian Football Federation) Emelec
	GK	Alfredo Bonnard	3 November 1930 (aged 29)	15	0	(Ecuadorian Football Federation) Patria
	FW	Clímaco Cañarte	5 February 1936 (aged 23)	8	0	(Ecuadorian Football Federation) Barcelona
	DF	Jaime Galarza	7 November 1934 (aged 25)	2	0	(Ecuadorian Football Federation) Patria
	DF	Rómulo Gómez	6 June 1934 (aged 25)	2	0	(Ecuadorian Football Federation) Emelec
	DF	Honorato Gonzabay	29 December 1929 (aged 29)	8	0	(Peruvian Football Federation) Atlético Chalaco
	FW	Ernesto Guerra	23 February 1934 (aged 25)	0	0	(Ecuadorian Football Federation) Barcelona
	DF	Jorge Izaguirre	23 January 1928 (aged 31)	7	0	(Ecuadorian Football Federation) 9 de Octubre
	DF	Vicente Lecaro	8 June 1936 (aged 23)	0	0	(Ecuadorian Football Federation) Barcelona
	MF	Flávio Nall	29 June 1934 (aged 25)	0	0	(Ecuadorian Football Federation) Valdez
	FW	Leonardo Palacios	2 April 1933 (aged 26)	0	0	(Ecuadorian Football Federation) Aucas
	FW	Carlos Raffo	10 April 1926 (aged 33)	0	0	(Ecuadorian Football Federation) Emelec
	MF	Ruperto Reeves	12 February 1934 (aged 25)	0	0	(Ecuadorian Football Federation) Barcelona
	MF	Juan Ruales		0	0	
	FW	Mario Saeteros		4	0	(Ecuadorian Football Federation) Patria
	FW	Alberto Spencer	6 December 1937 (aged 22)	0	0	(Uruguayan Football Association) Peñarol
	DF	Jaime Ubilla	20 October 1932 (aged 27)	0	0	(Ecuadorian Football Federation) Emelec
	GK	Cipriano Yu Lee	16 September 1933 (aged 26)	2	0	(Ecuadorian Football Federation) Emelec

== Paraguay ==
Head Coach: (Paraguay) Benjamín Laterza

No.	Pos.	Player	Date of birth (age)	Caps	Goals	Club
—	GK	Samuel Aguilar	16 March 1933 (aged 26)	2	0	(Paraguayan Football Association) Libertad
—	FW	Genaro Benítez	17 July 1929 (aged 30)	0	0	(Paraguayan Football Association) Cerro Porteño
—	FW	Pedro Cabral	6 February 1940 (aged 19)	0	0	(Paraguayan Football Association) 12 de Octubre
—	DF	Eligio Echagüe	31 December 1931 (aged 27)	7	0	(Paraguayan Football Association) Olimpia
—	FW	Rolando Esquivel		0	0	(Paraguayan Football Association) River Plate
—	DF	Crescencio Gómez		0	0	
—	FW	Eligio Insfrán	27 October 1935 (aged 24)	0	0	(Paraguayan Football Association) Guaraní
—	FW	Agustin Jara		0	0	(Paraguayan Football Association) River Plate
—	FW	Claudio Lezcano		3	0	(Paraguayan Football Association) Olimpia
—	DF	Idalino Monges	5 June 1940 (aged 19)	0	0	(Paraguayan Football Association) Cerro Porteño
—	DF	Carlos Monín	18 July 1939 (aged 20)	0	0	(Paraguayan Football Association) Cerro Porteño
—	FW	Fabián Muñoz	20 January 1939 (aged 17)	0	0	(Paraguayan Football Association) Sol de América
—	FW	Gerardo Núñez		0	0	(Paraguayan Football Association) Sportivo Luqueño
—	MF	Silvio Parodi	6 November 1931 (aged 28)	1	0	(Brazilian Football Confederation) Vasco da Gama
—	GK	Carlos Adolfo Riquelme	10 September 1928 (aged 31)	0	0	(Peruvian Football Federation) Atlético Chalaco
—	DF	Luis Gonzaga Torres		0	0	(Paraguayan Football Association) Cerro Porteño
—	DF	Salvador Villalba	29 August 1924 (aged 35)	13	1	(Paraguayan Football Association) Libertad
—	MF	Celso Zaracho		0	0	(Paraguayan Football Association) Cerro Porteño
—	FW	Eladio Zárate	14 January 1942 (aged 17)	0	0	(Paraguayan Football Association) General Caballero

== Uruguay ==
Head Coach: (Uruguay) Juan Carlos Corazzo

No.	Pos.	Player	Date of birth (age)	Caps	Goals	Club
	MF	Eladio Benítez	24 February 1939 (aged 20)	3	0	(Uruguayan Football Association) Racing de Montevideo
	FW	Mario Bergara	12 January 1937 (aged 22)	0	0	(Uruguayan Football Association) Racing de Montevideo
	MF	Carlos Chávez		1	0	(Uruguayan Football Association) Liverpool
	DF	Julio Dalmao	5 May 1940 (aged 19)	0	0	(Uruguayan Football Association) Cerro
	DF	Walter Davoine	27 March 1935 (aged 24)	5	0	(Uruguayan Football Association) Rampla Juniors
	GK	Luis Dogliotti	21 June 1937 (aged 22)	0	0	(Uruguayan Football Association) Liverpool
	FW	Vladas Douksas	14 March 1933 (aged 26)	6	3	(Uruguayan Football Association) Rampla Juniors
	FW	Guillermo Escalada	24 April 1936 (aged 23)	9	5	(Uruguayan Football Association) Nacional
	FW	Javier Espalter		0	0	(Uruguayan Football Association) Sud América
	DF	Jorge Gómez		0	0	(Uruguayan Football Association) Nacional
	DF	Rubén González	17 July 1939 (aged 20)	0	0	(Uruguayan Football Association) Nacional
	FW	Víctor Guaglianone	24 September 1936 (aged 23)	2	1	(Uruguayan Football Association) Montevideo Wanderers
	MF	Washington Manghini		2	0	(Uruguayan Football Association) Danubio
	DF	Mario Méndez	11 May 1938 (aged 21)	0	0	(Uruguayan Football Association) Sud América
	FW	Juan Carlos Mesías	6 July 1933 (aged 26)	5	0	(Uruguayan Football Association) Nacional
	FW	Domingo Pérez	7 June 1936 (aged 23)	2	1	(Uruguayan Football Association) Rampla Juniors
	FW	William Píriz	21 November 1934 (aged 25)	0	0	(Uruguayan Football Association) Defensor Sporting
	FW	José Sasía	27 December 1933 (aged 25)	15	4	(Uruguayan Football Association) Defensor Sporting
	MF	Alcides Silveira	18 March 1938 (aged 21)	4	0	(Uruguayan Football Association) Sud América
	GK	Roberto Sosa	14 June 1935 (aged 24)	0	0	(Uruguayan Football Association) Nacional
	DF	Horacio Troche	4 February 1936 (aged 23)	0	0	(Uruguayan Football Association) Nacional
