= 1920 South American Championship squads =

List of footballers

These are the squads for the countries that played in the 1920 South American Championship. The participating countries were Argentina, Brazil, Chile and Uruguay. The teams plays in a single round-robin tournament, earning two points for a win, one point for a draw, and zero points for a loss.

== Argentina ==
Head Coach: Federal Technical Committee

No.	Pos.	Player	Date of birth (age)	Caps	Goals	Club
—	FW	Atilio Badalini	12 May 1899 (aged 21)	5	3	(Argentine Football Association) Newell's Old Boys
—	DF	Florindo Bearzotti		1	0	(Argentine Football Association) Belgrano (Rosario)
—	DF	Rodolfo Bruzzone	1 January 1901 (aged 19)	0	0	(Argentine Football Association) Sportivo Palermo
—	FW	Pedro Calomino	13 March 1892 (aged 28)	24	4	(Argentine Football Association) Boca Juniors
—	DF	Antonio Cortella	11 October 1896 (aged 23)	6	0	(Argentine Football Association) Boca Juniors
—	MF	Antonio de Miguel	25 June 1899 (aged 21)	2	0	(Argentine Football Association) Newell's Old Boys
—	MF	Miguel Dellavalle	1 December 1898 (aged 21)	1	0	(Argentine Football Association) Belgrano (Córdoba)
—	FW	Raúl Echeverría		1	0	(Argentine Football Association) Estudiantes (LP)
—	MF	Angel Frumento		1	0	(Argentine Football Association) Banfield
—	FW	Julio Libonatti	5 July 1901 (aged 19)	5	4	(Argentine Football Association) Newell's Old Boys
—	FW	Fausto Lucarelli		3	0	(Argentine Football Association) Banfield
—	DF	Juan Presta		2	0	(Argentine Football Association) Porteño
—	GK	Américo Tesoriere	18 March 1899 (aged 21)	4	0	(Argentine Football Association) Boca Juniors
—	MF	Eduardo Uslenghi		7	0	(Argentine Football Association) Porteño

== Brazil ==
Head coach: (Brazil) Oswaldo Gomes

No.	Pos.	Player	Date of birth (age)	Caps	Goals	Club
—	MF	Adhemar	8 November 1896 (aged 23)	1	0	(Brazilian Football Confederation) América (RJ)
—	FW	Alvariza	16 April 1897 (aged 23)	0	0	(Brazilian Football Confederation) Brasil (RS)
—	GK	Ayrton	30 May 1898 (aged 22)	0	0	(Brazilian Football Confederation) Fluminense
—	FW	Castelhano	22 September 1892 (aged 27)	0	0	(Brazilian Football Confederation) Santos
—	FW	Claudionor	26 February 1901 (aged 19)	0	0	(Brazilian Football Confederation) Bangu
—	FW	Constantino	2 December 1899 (aged 20)	0	0	(Brazilian Football Confederation) Santos
—	DF	De María	12 May 1896 (aged 24)	0	0	(Brazilian Football Confederation) Andarahy
—	DF	Fortès	9 September 1901 (aged 19)	3	0	(Brazilian Football Confederation) Fluminense
—	DF	Japonês	9 December 1900 (aged 19)	0	0	(Brazilian Football Confederation) Flamengo
—	FW	Junqueira	12 June 1900 (aged 20)	0	0	(Brazilian Football Confederation) Flamengo
—	GK	Kuntz	3 September 1897 (aged 23)	0	0	(Brazilian Football Confederation) Flamengo
—	MF	Martins	30 August 1901 (aged 19)	1	0	(Brazilian Football Confederation) São Cristóvão
—	FW	Nonô	1 January 1899 (aged 21)	0	0	(Brazilian Football Confederation) Flamengo
—	FW	Rodrigo	12 April 1897 (aged 23)	0	0	(Brazilian Football Confederation) Flamengo
—	MF	Sisson	15 November 1894 (aged 25)	0	0	(Brazilian Football Confederation) Flamengo
—	DF	Telefone	21 July 1901 (aged 19)	0	0	(Brazilian Football Confederation) Flamengo
—	FW	Zezé I	2 May 1899 (aged 21)	0	0	(Brazilian Football Confederation) Fluminense

== Chile ==
Head Coach: (Uruguay) Juan Carlos Bertone

No.	Pos.	Player	Date of birth (age)	Caps	Goals	Club
—	FW	Hernando Bolados		2	0	(Football Federation of Chile) Santiago Wanderers
—	FW	Aurelio Domínguez	31 May 1896 (aged 24)	3	0	(Football Federation of Chile) Artillero de Costa
—	MF	Humberto Elgueta	10 September 1904 (aged 16)	0	0	(Football Federation of Chile) Gold Cross
—	FW	Alfredo France	29 October 1895 (aged 24)	7	2	(Football Federation of Chile) Gold Cross
—	GK	Manuel Guerrero	13 October 1896 (aged 23)	9	0	(Football Federation of Chile) La Cruz
—	FW	Horacio Muñoz	18 May 1896 (aged 24)	5	0	(Football Federation of Chile) Fernández Vial
—	FW	Blas Parra		0	0	(Football Federation of Chile) Artillero de Costa
—	DF	Ulises Poirier	2 February 1897 (aged 23)	3	0	(Football Federation of Chile) La Cruz
—	MF	Víctor Toro		0	0	(Football Federation of Chile) Fernández Vial
—	DF	Ramón Unzaga	18 July 1892 (aged 28)	5	0	(Football Federation of Chile) Estrella del Mar
—	FW	Víctor Varas		2	0	(Football Federation of Chile) Artillero de Costa
—	DF	Pedro Vergara		0	0	(Football Federation of Chile) Santiago Wanderers

== Uruguay ==
Head Coach: (Uruguay) Ernesto Fígoli

No.	Pos.	Player	Date of birth (age)	Caps	Goals	Club
—	GK	Manuel Beloutas		1	0	(Uruguayan Football Association) Universal
—	FW	Antonio Cámpolo	7 February 1897 (aged 23)	6	0	(Uruguayan Football Association) Peñarol
—	DF	Alfredo Foglino	1 February 1893 (aged 27)	39	0	(Uruguayan Football Association) Nacional
—	GK	Juan Legnazzi	1 January 1893 (aged 27)	4	0	(Uruguayan Football Association) Peñarol
—	MF	Sebastián Marroche		0	0	(Uruguayan Football Association) Reformers
—	FW	José Pérez	30 November 1897 (aged 22)	23	2	(Uruguayan Football Association) Peñarol
—	FW	José Piendibene	5 June 1890 (aged 30)	37	16	(Uruguayan Football Association) Peñarol
—	MF	Andrés Ravera		3	0	(Uruguayan Football Association) Peñarol
—	FW	Angel Romano	2 August 1893 (aged 27)	39	14	(Uruguayan Football Association) Nacional
—	MF	Pascual Ruotta		8	0	(Uruguayan Football Association) Peñarol
—	FW	Carlos Scarone	10 November 1888 (aged 31)	24	15	(Uruguayan Football Association) Nacional
—	FW	Pascual Somma	2 February 1899 (aged 21)	17	2	(Uruguayan Football Association) Nacional
—	DF	Domingo Tejera	9 July 1899 (aged 21)	0	0	(Uruguayan Football Association) Montevideo Wanderers
—	DF	Antonio Urdinarán	30 November 1898 (aged 21)	6	0	(Uruguayan Football Association) Nacional
—	MF	Juan José Villar		2	0	(Uruguayan Football Association) Universal
—	MF	Alfredo Zibechi	30 October 1895 (aged 24)	17	0	(Uruguayan Football Association) Nacional
—	MF	Armando Zibechi	21 January 1896 (aged 24)	0	0	(Uruguayan Football Association) Montevideo Wanderers
