= Elgueta =

Elgueta is a Spanish surname. Notable people with the surname include:

- Humberto Elgueta (1904–1976), Chilean footballer
- Jorge Elgueta (born 1969), Argentine volleyball player and coach
- Sergio Elgueta (1933–2025), Chilean politician

== See also ==
- Elgeta (Spanish: Elgueta), a town in the Spanish province of Gipuzkoa, Basque Country
