= Bria =

Bria may refer to:

== Names ==
- Bria (name), various people

== Organizations ==
- Bria Homes, a chain of real estate developments in the Philippines

== Places and jurisdictions ==
- Bria, Central African Republic, capital of Haute-Kottoo
- Bria, Phrygia, ancient city and former bishopric in present Anatolia, now a Latin Catholic titular see.

== Other uses ==
- Foxtron Bria, a battery electric compact crossover SUV

== See also ==
- Brea (disambiguation)
