= Brea =

Brea may refer to:

== Mythology ==
- Brea (mythology), an Irish mythological god

== People ==
- Anthony José Brea Salazar, a Venezuelan professional racing cyclist
- Armando Bréa, a Brazilian middle-distance runner
- Benjamín Brea, a Venezuelan musician
- Brea Beal, American basketball player
- Brea Grant, an American actress
- Cirilo de Alameda y Brea O.F.M. Obs. (1781-1872), Spanish cardinal of the Roman Catholic Church
- Diego de Brea, Slovenian theatre director
- Jennifer Brea, an American documentary filmmaker and activist
- Koby Brea, Dominican-American professional basketball player
- Julián Brea, Argentine professional football forward
- Lesli Brea, a former Major League Baseball player
- Ludovico Brea, a Renaissance painter
- Luigi Bernabò Brea, Italian archaeologist
- María Isabel Soldevila Brea, Dominican journalist, academician, and television presenter
- Teodosio César Brea, Argentine lawyer

== Places ==
- Brea, California, United States
- Brea, Cornwall, United Kingdom
- Brea, Thrace, an ancient Greek colony founded by Athens
- Brea de Tajo, a municipality of Madrid, in central Spain
- Brea de Aragón, a municipality located in the province of Zaragoza, Aragon, Spain
- La Brea, Trinidad and Tobago, a town located northeast of Point Fortin and southwest of San Fernando, southern Trinidad and Tobago

== Fictional characters ==
- Aya Brea, the protagonist in the Parasite Eve video game series.

== Other uses ==
- Brea (fly), a signal fly in the Platystomatinae subfamily of flies (Diptera)

== See also ==
- - La Brea (disambiguation)
  - Carn Brea (disambiguation)
- Bria (disambiguation)
  - Bria, Central African Republic
