= 1959 South American Championship squads =

1959 South American Championship squads may refer to:

- 1959 South American Championship (Argentina) squads, squads of the 1959 South American Championship held in Argentina from 7 March to 4 April
- 1959 South American Championship (Ecuador) squads, squads of the 1959 South American Championship held in Ecuador from 5 to 25 December
