= Calazans =

Calazans is a surname.

== Origins ==
The surname Calazans has its roots in the Iberian Peninsula, specifically in Portugal and Spain.

In Portugal, the surname Calazans is relatively common, with an incidence rate of 85 out of every 1 million people. It is believed that the surname may have originated in the northern regions of Portugal, where the word "calça" was used to refer to a type of traditional trousers worn by the locals.

In Spain, the surname Calazans is less common compared to Portugal, with an incidence rate of only 3 out of every 1 million people. It is likely that the surname spread to Spain through migration and intermarriage between Portuguese and Spanish families.

== Other variations of the surname ==
- Calasanz
- Calassanç

== People ==
- Joseph Calasanz (1557–1648), Spanish Catholic priest and educator. Honored as a saint by the Catholic Church
- José de Calasanz Vives y Tutó (1854–1913), Spanish Roman Catholic theologian
- Josephus Calasanz Fließer (1896–1960), Austrian clergyman and bishop
- José Alves Calazans (born 1939), Brazilian footballer
- Zózimo Alves Calazans (1932–1977), Brazilian footballer and coach
- Marcos Calazans (born 1996), Brazilian footballer

== Places ==
- Peralta de Calasanz, municipality located in the province of Huesca, Aragon, Spain.
