= Flecha =

Flecha is a surname. Notable people with the surname include:

- Flecha (footballer), full name Gilberto Alves de Souza (1946–2022), Brazilian footballer
- Juan Antonio Flecha (born 1977), Argentina-born Spanish road bicycle racer
- Mateo Flecha "El Viejo" (1481–1553), Spanish composer
- Ramon Flecha (born 1952), professor of sociology at the University of Barcelona
