= José de Assis Aragão =

Brazilian football referee

- Full name: José de Assis Aragão
- Born: 5 October 1939 (age 87); São Paulo, Brazil

Domestic
Years	League	Role
1970–1991	CBF	Referee

International
Years	League	Role
1981–1989	FIFA	Referee

José de Assis Aragão (born 5 October 1939), is a Brazilian former football referee.

== Referee career ==
A referee linked to the São Paulo Football Federation, Aragão refereed from 1970 to 1991, being an international referee from 1981 to 1980. He refereed some Campeonato Brasileiro Série A finals, the most notable being the 1986 between São Paulo FC and Guarani FC.

=== UFO sighting ===
On 6 March 1982, Aragão was one of the witnesses to the sighting of a UFO over the Morenão stadium in Campo Grande, where Operário FC and CR Vasco da Gama were playing. Even years after the event, Aragão claims to have seen a very strong light over the stadium, which remained still for more than 30 minutes.

=== Goal scored ===
On 9 October 1983, another unusual event involved Aragão, this time in a Campeonato Paulista match between SE Palmeiras and Santos FC. Aragão, who was positioned close to the goal line, scored a goal, after a corner taken by Jorginho Putinatti bounced off him and went into the goal defended by goalkeeper Marolla. The goal was valid and attributed to Jorginho, since according to the rules at the time, the referee was a neutral element. As time passed, the referee began to take the event as a joke, saying that he was a supporter of SE Palmeiras and scored the goal on purpose, a fact that was clearly untrue.

== Another functions in sports ==
José Assis de Aragão had a short career as a manager in the early 1990s, and managed the teams Nacional-SP, Serra Negra EC and São José EC. He was also president of the São Paulo council of referees and the National Sports Council in Brazil (CNE).
