= BIU =

BIU, Biu or biu may refer to:

- Biu, Nigeria, a town in Nigeria
  - Biu Emirate, a traditional state
  - Biu Plateau, the highland area
- Bar-Ilan University, a university in Israel
- Benson Idahosa University, a private university in Nigeria
- Bermuda Industrial Union, a general trade union in Bermuda
- Biu (footballer) (1936–2025), Brazilian footballer
- Bus Interface Unit, a part of a processor that interfaces with a system bus
- BIU, the IATA airport code for Bíldudalur Airport in Iceland
- When stylized as BIU, stands for bold, italic and underline, three common ways to mark emphasis in typography
- biu, the ISO 639 code of the Biate language of northeast India

== See also ==
- Biu–Mandara languages, a language group of Nigeria, Chad and Cameroon
