= Altemir =

Altemir is a given name. Notable people with the name include:

- Altemir Gregolin (born 1964), Brazilian veterinarian and politician
- Altemir Cordeiro Pessôa Neto or Neto Pessoa (born 1994), Brazilian footballer
- Altemir Marquez da Cruz (1938–2019), Brazilian footballer
