= Givaldo =

Givaldo is a given name. Notable people with the name include:

- Givaldo (footballer) or Givaldo Bezerra Cordeiro (born 1935), Brazilian footballer
- Givaldo Barbosa (born 1954), Brazilian tennis player

== See also ==
- Giraldo
