= Éderson (footballer, born 1989) =

Brazilian footballer

Personal information
- Full name: Éderson Alves Ribeiro Silva
- Date of birth: 13 March 1989 (age 37)
- Place of birth: Pentecoste, Brazil
- Height: 1.71 m (5 ft 7 in)
- Position: Striker

Youth career
- 2006: Ceará
- 2007–2008: Atlético Paranaense

Senior career*
Years	Team	Apps	(Gls)
2008–2015	Atlético Paranaense	67	(29)
2008	→ Ceará (loan)	14	(2)
2010–2011	→ ABC (loan)	23	(5)
2012	→ Ceará (loan)	1	(0)
2012	→ ABC (loan)	26	(12)
2014–2015	→ Al Wasl (loan)	33	(15)
2015–2018	Kashiwa Reysol	26	(5)
2016–2017	→ Vasco da Gama (loan)	27	(8)
2017–2018	→ Atlético Paranaense (loan)	40	(13)
2018–2021	Fortaleza	53	(10)
2021	ABC	17	(4)
2021	Botafogo-PB	19	(4)
2022	Chapecoense	12	(1)
2023	São Luiz	11	(1)
- * Club domestic league appearances and goals as of 2 December 2023

Éderson Alves Ribeiro Silva (born 13 March 1989), simply known as Éderson, is a Brazilian professional footballer who plays as a striker. During the 2013 season, he scored 21 goals out of 36 Série A games which made him the league top scorer.

== Honours ==
ABC

- Campeonato Brasileiro Série C: 2010
- Campeonato Potiguar: 2011

Ceará

- Campeonato Cearense: 2012

Individual

- Campeonato Brasileiro Série A top scorer: 2013
- Campeonato Brasileiro Série A Team of the Year: 2013
