= Ruperto Reeves =

Ecuadorian footballer (1934–2019)

Ruperto Reeves Patterson
Personal information
- Full name: Ruperto Radeiffo Reeves Patterson
- Date of birth: 12 February 1934
- Place of birth: Santa Elena, Ecuador
- Date of death: 9 December 2019 (aged 85)
- Position: Midfielder

Senior career*
Years	Team	Apps	(Gls)
?-1954	9 de Octubre		
1954-1966	Barcelona SC		

International career
1959-1963	Ecuador	6	(0)
- * Club domestic league appearances and goals

Ruperto Reeves (12 February 1934 – 9 December 2019) was an Ecuadorian footballer.

He was part of Ecuador's squads for the 1959 (Ecuador) and 1963 Copa America.

In 1957 he scored Barcelona SC's first ever goal in the Ecuadorian Championship.

== International career ==
Reeves was selected in Ecuador's squad for the 1959 South American Championship on home soil and played three games, the one against Uruguay on 6 December being his first cap with Ecuador.

Two days after the end of the tournament, on 27 December 1959, Reeves played a friendly game against Brazil in Guayaquil.

Reeves was also in Ecuador's squad for the 1963 South American Championship, playing two games in the tournament, the game against Brazil on 27 March being his sixth and last cap with Ecuador.

Reeves died on 9 December 2019, at the age of 85.
