= Bria (name) =

Bria is a name. It has been used as both a given name and surname. Notable people include:

== Given name ==
- Bria Hartley (born 1992), American professional basketball player
- Bria Skonberg (born 1983), Canadian trumpet player, vocalist and composer
- Bria Valente, American singer
- Bria Vinaite, American actress

== Surname ==
- Benyamin Yosef Bria (1956–2007), Indonesian Bishop of the Roman Catholic Diocese of Denpasar
- Dora Bria (1958–2008), Brazilian windsurfer
- George E. Bria (1916–2017), Italian American journalist
- Modesto Bria (1922–1996), Paraguayan football midfielder and manager

== Nickname ==
- Bria (footballer), Cosme Rodrigues de Melo (1928–2005), Brazilian football defender
