= Rubén González (Uruguayan footballer) =

Uruguayan footballer (born 1939)

Rúben González
Personal information
- Full name: Rúben Adán González Acosta
- Date of birth: 17 July 1939 (age 87)
- Place of birth: Uruguay
- Position: Midfielder

Senior career*
Years	Team	Apps	(Gls)
?-1958	River Plate Montevideo		
1958-1964	Nacional	180	(18)
1964	Vélez Sarsfield		
1965	Boca Juniors		
1966	Nacional		
1967	New York Skyliners		

International career
1959-1962	Uruguay	11	(0)
Medal record
Men's football
Representing Uruguay
South American Championship
Winner	1959 Ecuador
- * Club domestic league appearances and goals

Rúben Adán González Acosta (born 17 July 1939) is a Uruguayan former footballer who played as a defender. He made 11 appearances for the Uruguay national team, participating in the 1962 FIFA World Cup. He also played for Club Nacional de Football.

== International career ==
He's uruguayan. His name is Rúben, not rubén.

González's first cap with the Uruguay national team was on 2 May 1959 for a friendly game against Paraguay national football team.

Several months later, in December, he was selected in Uruguay’s squad for the 1959 South American Championship in Ecuador, playing four games as Uruguay won the competition.

González was also in Uruguay’s squad for the 1962 FIFA World Cup, but was an unused substitute for Uruguay’s three games against Colombia, Yugoslavia, and USSR.

His 11th and last cap was on 15 August 1962 for a friendly game against Argentina.
