= Leôncio Vieira =

Brazilian footballer (1934–1992)

Vieira
Personal information
- Full name: Leôncio Abel Alves Vieira
- Date of birth: 23 June 1934
- Place of birth: Joinville, Brazil
- Date of death: 22 October 1992 (aged 58)
- Place of death: Porto Alegre, Brazil
- Position: Left winger

Senior career*
Years	Team	Apps	(Gls)
1953–1955	Caxias-SC		
1955–1968	Grêmio	560	(106)
1968	→ Cruzeiro-RS (loan)		
1969–1971	Cruzeiro-RS		

International career
1966	Brazil	2	(0)

Managerial career
- 1974–1979: Grêmio (youth)
- 1979: Chapecoense
- 1979: Criciúma
- 1980: Marcílio Dias
- 1981: Figueirense
- 1982: São Paulo-RS
- * Club domestic league appearances and goals as of 15 April 2024

Leôncio Abel Alves Vieira (23 June 1934 – 22 October 1992), simply known as Vieira or Leôncio Vieira, was a Brazilian professional footballer and manager, who played as a left winger.

== Career ==
Juarez Teixeira attacking partner at Caxias de Joinville, he was brought to Grêmio FBPA with by the coach Oswaldo Rolla. He played for the club from 1955 to 1968, winning 11 state titles, 9 city titles and the 1962 South-Brazilian Championship.

In 1966, he was part of the Rio Grande do Sul representation that competed for the Brazil team in the Copa Bernardo O'Higgins.

== Personal life ==
Vieira is father of the also footballer Celso.

== Honours ==
Caxias

- Campeonato Catarinense: 1954

Grêmio

- Campeonato Gaúcho: 1956, 1957, 1958, 1959, 1960, 1962, 1963, 1964, 1965, 1966, 1967
- Campeonato Sul-Brasileiro: 1962
- Campeonato Citadino de Porto Alegre: 1956, 1957, 1958, 1959, 1960, 1964, 1965

Brazil

- Copa Bernardo O'Higgins: 1966

Individual

- Prêmio Belfort Duarte: 1966
