= Sebastião Leônidas =

Brazilian footballer (born 1936)

Personal information
- Date of birth: 6 April 1938 (age 88)
- Place of birth: Jerônimo Monteiro, Brazil
- Position: Defender

Senior career*
Years	Team	Apps	(Gls)
1957–1959	América-MG		
1960–1965	America-RJ		
1966–1971	Botafogo	247	(1)

International career
1966–1968	Brazil	3	(0)

Managerial career
- 1972–1973: Botafogo
- 1973–1976: América-RN
- 1977: Botafogo
- 1977: Volta Redonda
- 1978: Ceará
- 1983: Botafogo
- 1985: ABC
- 1986: Botafogo
- 1990: Friburguense
- * Club domestic league appearances and goals as of 27 April 2025

Leônidas and Washington at the America vs. Benfica match

Sebastião Leônidas (born 6 April 1936) is a Brazilian former professional footballer and manager who played as a defender.

== Club career ==
During his career, Sebastião Leônidas played for the teams América Mineiro, America-RJ and Botafogo, achieving the feat of being champion with all three clubs. He is considered one of the best defenders in the history of Botafogo, being nominated for the club's history hall of fame.

== International career ==
Leônidas played in three friendly matches for Brazil national team between 1966 and 1968, against Wales, Chile and Argentina.

== Managerial career ==
As a coach, he managed Botafogo for the most part, with his greatest achievements being the title of the last edition of the Torneio Início Carioca, and the 6–0 victory over Flamengo in the 1972 Campeonato Brasileiro Série A. He also managed América de Natal, Ceará, Volta Redonda, ABC and Friburguense. Sebastião Leônidas worked for several years in the youth sectors of Botafogo, before retiring completely in 2012.

== Honours ==
=== Player ===
América-MG

- Campeonato Mineiro: 1957

America-RJ

- Campeonato Carioca: 1960

Botafogo

- Campeonato Carioca: 1967, 1968
- Torneio Rio-São Paulo: 1966
- Taça Guanabara: 1967, 1968
- Taça Brasil: 1968
- Troféu Triangular de Caracas: 1967

=== Manager ===
América-RN

- Taça Almir de Albuquerque: 1973
- Campeonato Potiguar: 1974, 1975

Botafogo

- Torneio Início Carioca: 1977
