= Adhemar Bianchini =

Brazilian footballer (1940–2005)

Bianchini
Personal information
- Full name: Adhemar Bianchini de Carvalho
- Date of birth: 28 September 1940
- Place of birth: Cordeiro, Brazil
- Date of death: 28 October 2005 (aged 65)
- Place of death: Nova Friburgo, Brazil
- Position: Forward

Youth career
- Bangu

Senior career*
Years	Team	Apps	(Gls)
1960–1964	Bangu		
1965–1966	Botafogo		
1966–1969	Vasco da Gama		
1967	→ Atlético Mineiro (loan)		
1969–1970	Flamengo		
1970–1971	Red Star		
1971	São José-SP		
1972–1973	Puebla		

International career
1965	Brazil	3	(0)
- * Club domestic league appearances and goals

Adhemar Bianchini de Carvalho (28 September 1940 – 28 October 2005) was a Brazilian professional footballer who played as a forward.

== Career ==
Revealed at Bangu, Bianchini was top scorer in the state championship in 1963 with 18 goals, being called up to the Brazil national team in 1965, where he played three friendly matches. He also played for Botafogo, Atlético Mineiro, Flamengo and Vasco da Gama, where he was champion of the Rio-São Paulo Tournament in 1966. At the end of his career he played in France for Red Star, São José-SP and Puebla.

== Death ==
Bianchini died in Nova Friburgo, 28 October 2005, after undergoing heart surgery.

== Honours ==
Vasco da Gama

- Torneio Rio-São Paulo: 1966

Individual

- 1963 Campeonato Carioca top scorer: 18 goals
