= Geroldo =

Brazilian footballer (born 1933)

Personal information
- Full name: Geroldo Guimarães Ramos
- Date of birth: 14 March 1933 (age 93)
- Place of birth: Pentecoste, Brazil

International career
Years	Team	Apps	(Gls)
1959	Brazil	1	(0)

Geroldo Guimarães Ramos (born 14 March 1933), known as just Geroldo, is a Brazilian footballer. He played in one match for the Brazil national football team in 1959. He was also part of Brazil's squad for the 1959 South American Championship that took place in Ecuador.
