= Volmir (footballer) =

Brazilian footballer (born 1944)

Personal information
- Full name: Volmir Francisco de Souza
- Date of birth: 5 July 1944 (age 82)
- Place of birth: Vacaria, Brazil
- Height: 1.75 m (5 ft 9 in)
- Position: Left winger

Senior career*
Years	Team	Apps	(Gls)
1963–1964	Lajeadense		
1964–1972	Grêmio	277	(64)
1972–1974	Internacional		
1974	America-RJ		
1975	Figueirense		
1976–1977	Chapecoense		
1977	Paranavaí		
1977–1979	Sergipe		

International career
1966–1967	Brazil	3	(0)
- * Club domestic league appearances and goals as of 20 May 2024

Volmir Francisco de Souza (born 5 July 1944), simply known as Volmir or by the nickname Volmir Massaroca, is a Brazilian former professional footballer who played as a left winger.

== Career ==
Left winger, Volmir was part of Grêmio's victorious team at the end of the 1960s, making 277 appearances for the club and scoring 64 goals. He also had a notable spell at SC Internacional, where he was champion in 1972 and 1973, and at Figueirense FC in 1975, being considered one of the best players to have ever played for the club.

Volmir also played three matches for the Brazil national team between 1966 and 1967.

== Honours ==
Grêmio

- Campeonato Gaúcho: 1965, 1966, 1967, 1968
- Campeonato Citadino de Porto Alegre: 1965

Internacional

- Campeonato Gaúcho: 1972, 1973

Brazil

- Copa Bernardo O'Higgins: 1966
