= Murilo (footballer, born 1939) =

Brazilian footballer

Personal information
- Full name: Paulo Murilo Frederico Ferreira
- Date of birth: 30 April 1939
- Place of birth: Rio de Janeiro, Brazil
- Date of death: 18 December 2022 (aged 83)
- Place of death: Rio de Janeiro, Brazil
- Position: Right back

Youth career
- Olaria

Senior career*
Years	Team	Apps	(Gls)
1959–1962	Olaria		
1963–1971	Flamengo	448	(3)
1972–1974	Tiradentes-PI		
1975	Ríver-PI		
1976	Americano		

International career
1966–1968	Brazil	2	(0)

Managerial career
- 1976: Flamengo-PI
- * Club domestic league appearances and goals as of 14 April 2024

Paulo Murilo Frederico Ferreira (30 April 1939 – 18 December 2022), simply known as Murilo, was a Brazilian professional footballer and manager, who played as a right back.

== Career ==
Revealed by Olaria AC, Murilo became one of the players with the most appearances for CR Flamengo, with 448 matches. He won the state championship in 1963 and 1965, and also played in Piauí football and Americano. After retiring as a player, he had experience as a coach at EC Flamengo, becoming state champion.

Murilo also made two official appearances for the Brazil national team, in 1966 against Wales and in 1968 against Argentina.

== Honours ==
=== Player ===
Flamengo

- Campeonato Carioca: 1963, 1965
- Trofeo Naranja: 1964

=== Manager ===
Flamengo-PI

- Campeonato Piauiense: 1976
