= José Calazans =

Brazilian footballer

Calazans
Personal information
- Full name: José Alves Calazans
- Date of birth: 20 October 1939 (age 87)
- Place of birth: Salvador, Brazil
- Position: Right winger

Youth career
- Bangu

Senior career*
Years	Team	Apps	(Gls)
1953–1957	Bangu		
1958–1960	America		
1961–1964	Fluminense	91	(16)

International career
1956–1959	Brazil	2	(0)
- * Club domestic league appearances and goals as of 18 February 2024

José Alves Calazans (born 20 October 1939), is a Brazilian former professional footballer who played as a right winger.

== Career ==
Calazans began his career at Bangu, and played there until 1957. In 1960, he was one of the main people responsible for América's title in the Campeonato Carioca, scoring a historic free kick against Flamengo. He also made almost 100 appearances for Fluminense, his last club.

Calazans played twice for the Brazil national team, in 1956 in the Oswaldo Cruz Cup and in 1959 in the Bernardo O'Higgins Cup.

== Personal life ==
Calazans is brother of also footballer Zózimo. After retiring from football, he worked at the transportation department of the state of Rio de Janeiro.

== Honours ==
America-RJ

- Campeonato Carioca: 1960

Brazil

- Taça Oswaldo Cruz: 1956
- Copa Bernardo O'Higgins: 1959
