= Bria (Phrygia) =

Ancient city in Phrygia, Asia Minor

Bria is an ancient city in Phrygia, Asia Minor. Bria was located in the late Roman province of Phrygia Pacatiana Prima, south of Acmonia. It was probably within the conventus iuridicus of Apamea.

Bria is the Thraco-Phrygian word for 'town', and appears in other placenames, such as Mesembria and Selymbria.

Bria issued coins under the Severan dynasty.

== Ecclesiastical history ==
The see of Bria was a suffragan of Laodicea in Phrygia (Laodicea on the Lycus). Its only historically documented bishop was Macedonius, who participated in the council of Constantinople of 536. It is not documented in Notitiae episcoporum which started in the 7th century nor in Lequien's Oriens Christianus.

In 1933, the diocese became the Latin titular bishopric of Bria.

== Sources ==
- GCatholic - data for all sections
- Sylvain Destephen, Prosopographie chrétienne du Bas-Empire 3. Prosopographie du diocèse d'Asie (325-641), Paris 2008
