= Idalino Monges =

Paraguayan footballer (1940–2025)

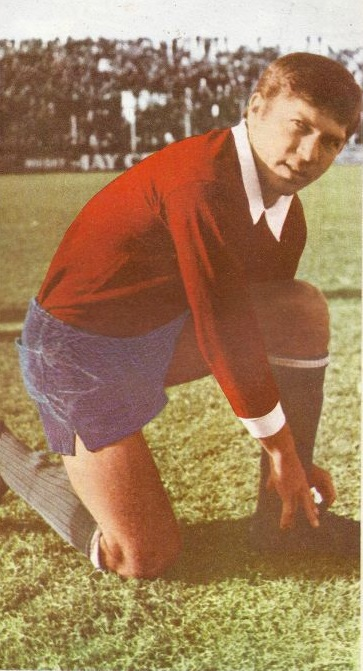

Personal information
- Date of birth: 5 June 1940
- Date of death: 2 August 2025 (aged 85)
- Position: Defender

International career
Years	Team	Apps	(Gls)
1963–1971	Paraguay	17	(0)

Idalino Monges (5 June 1940 – 2 August 2025) was a Paraguayan footballer. He played in 17 matches for the Paraguay national football team from 1963 and 1971. He was also part of Paraguay's squad for the 1959 South American Championship that took place in Ecuador. Monges died on 2 August 2025, at the age of 85.
