= Sergio Elgueta =

Chilean politician (1933–2025)

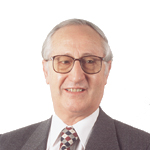

Member of the Chamber of Deputies
- In office 11 March 1990 – 11 March 2002
- Preceded by: District created
- Succeeded by: Eduardo Lagos Herrera
- Constituency: 57th District

Mayor of Puerto Montt
- In office 1971–1973

Personal details
- Born: 4 February 1933 Puerto Montt, Chile
- Died: 3 January 2025 (aged 91) Puerto Montt, Chile
- Party: Christian Democratic Party (DC)
- Spouse: Lilian Catalán
- Children: Three
- Education: University of Concepción (LL.B)
- Occupation: Politician
- Profession: Lawyer

Sergio Benedicto Elgueta Barrientos (4 February 1933 – 3 January 2025) was a Chilean politician who served as a deputy. He died on 3 January 2025, at the age of 91.

== Family and early life ==
He was born in Puerto Montt on 4 February 1933, the son of Benedicto Elgueta and María Isabel Barrientos. He married Lilian Catalán Barrientos and was the father of three children.

He completed his primary education at Escuela Fiscal No. 7 in Puerto Montt and his secondary studies at Colegio San Francisco Javier in the same city. After finishing school, he entered the University of Concepción, where he studied Law and qualified as a lawyer.

== Political career ==
He began his political activities during his university years, when he joined the Falange Nacional and later the Christian Democratic Party in 1957. Representing the latter, he held the highest provincial and communal offices in the Province of Llanquihue.

He later served as secretary general of the 1964 presidential campaign of Eduardo Frei Montalva and as campaign manager (generalísimo) of the Christian Democratic presidential candidate Radomiro Tomic in 1970.

He was elected councilor (regidor) of the Municipality of Puerto Montt on three occasions: 1963, 1967, and 1971. He also served as Mayor of Puerto Montt between 1971 and 1973.

He was in charge of the Commission Pro Visit of Pope John Paul II to the Tenth Region.

In the first parliamentary elections following the return to democracy, in December 1989, he was elected deputy with the highest vote in District No. 57 (communes of Calbuco, Maullín, Cochamó, and Puerto Montt), Tenth Region. He obtained 22,650 votes, equivalent to 28.63% of the valid votes.

In December 1993, he was re-elected in the same district—again with the highest district vote—after obtaining 24,895 votes, corresponding to 30.85% of the total votes.

In December 1997, he was once again re-elected for District No. 57, where he received 19,404 votes, equivalent to 27.46% of the validly cast ballots.

In 2001, he ran for re-election in District No. 57 but was not re-elected.

After completing his parliamentary duties, he returned to the practice of law. He served as notary in Puerto Varas and as a substitute judge (abogado integrante) of the Court of Appeals in Puerto Montt.

He died on 3 January 2025 in Puerto Montt at the age of 91.
