= Carlos Arredondo (footballer) =

Argentine footballer (born 1933)

Personal information
- Date of birth: 26 October 1933 (age 93)
- Place of birth: Buenos Aires, Argentina
- Position: Defender

Senior career*
Years	Team	Apps	(Gls)
1954-1955	Boca Juniors		
1956	Banfield		
1957-1963	Huracán		
1964-1967	Argentino de Quilmes		

International career
1959	Argentina	3	(0)
- * Club domestic league appearances and goals

Carlos Arredondo (born 26 October 1933) is an Argentine footballer. He played in three matches for the Argentina national football team in 1959. He was also part of Argentina's squad for the 1959 South American Championship that took place in Ecuador.
