= Rodrigo (footballer, born 1897) =

Brazilian footballer

Personal information
- Full name: Rodrigo Antonio Brandão
- Date of birth: 12 April 1897
- Date of death: 6 March 1959 (aged 61)

International career
Years	Team	Apps	(Gls)
1920	Brazil	1	(0)

Rodrigo Antonio Brandão (12 April 1897 – 6 March 1959), known as Rodrigo, was a Brazilian footballer. He played in one match for the Brazil national football team in 1920. He was also part of Brazil's squad for the 1920 South American Championship.
