= Rodolfo Bruzzone =

Argentine footballer

Personal information
- Date of birth: 1901
- Position: Defender

International career
Years	Team	Apps	(Gls)
1920–1921	Argentina	4	(0)

Rodolfo Bruzzone (born 1901, date of death unknown) was an Argentine footballer. He played in four matches for the Argentina national football team in 1920 and 1921. He was also part of Argentina's squad for the 1920 South American Championship.
