= João Severiano =

Brazilian footballer

Personal information
- Full name: João Carlos da Silva Severiano
- Date of birth: 26 September 1941 (age 85)
- Place of birth: Porto Alegre, Brazil
- Position: Midfielder

Youth career
- Grêmio

Senior career*
Years	Team	Apps	(Gls)
1960–1961	Grêmio		
1961	Independiente		
1962–1972	Grêmio		

International career
1966	Brazil	2	(2)
- * Club domestic league appearances and goals as of 9 February 2024

João Carlos da Silva Severiano (born 26 September 1941), better known as João Severiano or Joãozinho, is a Brazilian former professional footballer who played as a midfielder.

== Career ==
A player of extreme skill and intelligence, it didn't take long for him to rise to Grêmio's professional ranks. For Grêmio FBPA, João Severiano made 423 appearances and scored 135 goals, playing from 1960 to 1972, having a brief spell at CA Independiente de Avellaneda in 1961, where he did not receive many opportunities to play. He was seven-time state champion from 1962 to 1968.

Marino also made 2 appearances for the Brazil national team in total, during the 1966 Copa Bernardo O'Higgins against Chile, scoring 2 goals.

== Personal life ==
João Severiano entered political life after retiring, both in Rio Grande do Sul as a state deputy, and at Grêmio participating in the club's political life.

== Honours ==
Grêmio

- Campeonato Gaúcho: 1962, 1963, 1964, 1965, 1966, 1967, 1968
- Campeonato Sul-Brasileiro: 1962
- Campeonato Citadino de Porto Alegre: 1960, 1964, 1965

Brazil

- Copa Bernardo O'Higgins: 1966
