= Altemir (footballer) =

Brazilian footballer

Personal information
- Full name: Altemir Marquez da Cruz
- Date of birth: 10 October 1938
- Place of birth: Curitiba, Brazil
- Date of death: 13 July 2019 (aged 80)
- Place of death: Curitiba, Brazil
- Position: Right back

Youth career
- União Juventus

Senior career*
Years	Team	Apps	(Gls)
1959–1960	Atlético Paranaense		
1961–1962	Grêmio		
1962	Aimoré		
1963–1970	Grêmio		
1970	Aimoré		
1972	Cruzeiro-RS		

International career
1966	Brazil	2	(0)
- * Club domestic league appearances and goals as of 21 May 2024

Altemir Marquez da Cruz (10 October 1938 – 13 July 2019), simply known as Altemir, was a Brazilian professional footballer who played as a right back.

== Career ==
A right-back for Grêmio during the 1960s, Altemir was part of the main achievements of the decade, and played for the club in 317 matches. He also played for Athletico Paranaense, Aimoré and Cruzeiro-RS. In 2003 he was included in the Grêmio FBPA hall of fame. Altemir also played for the Brazil national team in two matches, against Chile, valid for the 1966 Copa Bernardo O'Higgins.

== Honours ==
Grêmio

- Campeonato Gaúcho: 1962, 1963, 1964, 1965, 1966, 1967, 1968
- Campeonato Citadino de Porto Alegre: 1964, 1965
- Copa Rio de la Plata: 1968

Brazil

- Copa Bernardo O'Higgins: 1966

== Death ==
Altemir died from a stroke, on 13 July 2019, at age of 80.
