= Claudionor Corrêa =

Brazilian footballer (1901–1982)

Bolão
Personal information
- Full name: Claudionor Corrêa
- Date of birth: 26 February 1901
- Place of birth: Rio de Janeiro, Brazil
- Date of death: 1982 (aged 80–81)
- Place of death: Rio de Janeiro, Brazil
- Positions: Midfielder; forward

Senior career*
| Years | Team | Apps | (Gls) |
| 1917–1921 | Bangu | | |
| 1922–1928 | Vasco da Gama | 161 | (54) |
- * Club domestic league appearances and goals as of 23 March 2024

Claudionor Corrêa (26 February 1901 – 1982), also known as Bolão, was a Brazilian footballer who played as a midfielder and forward.

== Career ==
A player with great physical ability, Claudionor played both as a forward and as a midfielder. He started his career at Bangu and became part of the Brazil national team that competed in the 1920 South American Championship. Hired by Vasco in 1923, where he was part of the squad that won the club's first two state titles. He also worked at the Port of Rio de Janeiro.

== Honours ==
Bangu

- Taça Federação Brasileira das Sociedades de Remo: 1917
- Taça Moraes: 1920
- Taça James Hartley: 1921

Vasco da Gama

- Campeonato Carioca - Série A2: 1922
- Campeonato Carioca: 1923, 1924 (LMDT)
- Torneio Início do Rio de Janeiro: 1926
- Taça Alberto Baccarat: 1928

Individual

- 1920 Campeonato Carioca top scorer: 18 goals
