= José Carbone =

Argentine footballer (1930–2014)

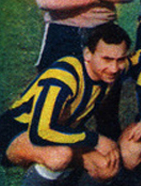

Personal information
- Full name: José Ángel Carbone
- Date of birth: 15 September 1930
- Date of death: 7 June 2014 (aged 83)
- Position: Midfielder

International career
Years	Team	Apps	(Gls)
1959	Argentina	1	(0)

José Carbone (15 September 1930 – 7 June 2014) was an Argentine footballer. He played in one match for the Argentina national football team in 1959. He was also part of Argentina's squad for the 1959 South American Championship that took place in Ecuador.
