= Carn Brea =

Carn Brea may refer to several places:

- Carn Brea Castle, former hunting lodge in Cornwall
- Carn Brea railway station, a former railway station on the Cornish Main Line
- Carn Brea, Redruth, neolithic hill site and civil parish in Cornwall
- Carn Brea Village, a village between Camborne and Redruth, Cornwall
- Chapel Carn Brea, St Just in Penwith, Cornwall, the westernmost hill in Britain
