= Samuel Mattos =

Brazilian footballer

Mattos
Personal information
- Full name: Samuel Pereira de Mattos
- Date of birth: 15 May 1933 (age 93)
- Place of birth: Rio de Janeiro, Brazil
- Position: Forward

Youth career
- 1949–1951: Palmeiras

Senior career*
Years	Team	Apps	(Gls)
1952–1955	Palmeiras	15	(1)
1955	XV de Piracicaba		
1956	Náutico		
1956	Fluminense		
1957–1962	Vitória	145	(77)
1962	Bahia		
1963–1969	Leônico		
1970–1971	Redenção		

International career
1957	Brazil	2	(1)
- * Club domestic league appearances and goals as of 20 February 2024

Samuel Pereira de Mattos (born 15 May 1933), is a Brazilian former professional footballer who played as a forward.

== Career ==
Born in Rio de Janeiro, Mattos moved to São Paulo at a young age and began his career with Palmeiras youth team. He remained at the club until 1955, when he was traded to XV de Piracicaba, and then to Fluminense. In 1957 he was hired by Vitória and became largely responsible for winning the 1957 state title, becoming top scorer and scoring 4 goals in a single game against Bahia, which earned him a call-up to the Brazil national team that participated in the Copa Bernardo O'Higgins. He later played for Bahia, Leônico and Redenção. After retiring, he trained as a lawyer and became a municipal judge in Salvador, the city where he still lives.

== Honours ==
Vitória

- Campeonato Baiano: 1957

Individual

- 1957 Campeonato Baiano top scorer: 14 goals
