= Luis Dogliotti =

Uruguayan footballer (1937-2017)

Personal information
- Date of birth: 21 June 1937
- Place of birth: Cerrillos
- Date of death: 27 April 2017 (aged 79)
- Position: Goalkeeper

International career
Years	Team	Apps	(Gls)
1961	Uruguay	3	(0)

Luis Dogliotti (21 June 1937 – 27 April 2017) was a Uruguayan footballer. He played in three matches for the Uruguay national football team in 1961. He was also part of Uruguay's squad for the 1959 South American Championship that took place in Ecuador.
