= Elcy =

Brazilian footballer (1938–2010)

Personal information
- Full name: Elcy Goulart de Freitas
- Date of birth: 5 December 1938
- Place of birth: Recife, Pernambuco, Brazil
- Date of death: 15 December 2010 (aged 72)
- Place of death: Araruama, Rio de Janeiro, Brazil
- Position: Forward

Senior career*
Years	Team	Apps	(Gls)
1958-1963	Sport Recife		
1963-1964	Palmeiras		
1964-1968	Náutico PE		

International career
1959	Brazil	1	(0)
- * Club domestic league appearances and goals

Elcy Goulart de Freitas (5 December 1938 – 15 December 2010), known as just Elcy, was a Brazilian footballer who played as a forward. He made one appearance for the Brazil national team on 12 December 1959, against Uruguay, during the 1959 South American Championship that took place in Ecuador. Elcy died on 5 December 2010, at the age of 72.
