= Parada (footballer) =

Brazilian footballer (1939–2018)

Personal information
- Full name: Antônio Parada Neto
- Date of birth: 20 February 1939
- Place of birth: Araraquara, Brazil
- Date of death: 21 November 2018 (aged 79)
- Place of death: São Paulo, Brazil
- Position: Forward

Youth career
- Ferroviária
- 1956: Ypiranga

Senior career*
Years	Team	Apps	(Gls)
1957–1960	Palmeiras	71	(19)
1961–1962	Ferroviária		
1963–1966	Bangu		
1966–1967	Botafogo		
1967	Guarani		
1967	Bangu		
1968	Corinthians	3	(1)
1968	Botafogo		
1969	Bangu		
1970	Fast Clube		
1971–1975	Rio Negro-AM		

International career
1966	Brazil		
- * Club domestic league appearances and goals as of 5 January 2024

Antônio Parada Neto (20 February 1939 – 21 November 2018), better known as Parada, was a Brazilian professional footballer who played as a forward.

== Career ==
Parada began his career with Ferroviária youth team, but moved to São Paulo with his father, where he began to stand out in amateur matches. He arrived at the age of 17 at SE Palmeiras, a club where he made 71 appearances and was state champion in 1959. Still in 1959, he formed an attacking partnership with Pelé in the Brazilian military team.

He returned to his hometown and Ferroviária in 1961 and played there for two seasons. In 1963, he was hired by Bangu AC where he remained until the beginning of 1966, when he was acquired by Botafogo for 150 million cruzeiros. At Botafogo he was champion of the 1966 Rio-São Paulo Tournament, where he was also the top scorer, the 1968 state tournament, in addition to the Caranza Tournament, held in Argentina. Parada was also called up to the Brazil national team in 1966, which was carrying out tests to define the team that would go to the 1966 FIFA World Cup. He ended his career during the 70s in Amazonas football.

== Honours ==
Palmeiras

- Campeonato Paulista: 1959

Botafogo

- Torneio Rio-São Paulo: 1966 (shared)
- Campeonato Carioca: 1968

Fast Clube

- Campeonato Amazonense: 1970

Individual

- 1966 Torneio Rio-São Paulo top scorer: 8 goals

== Death ==
Parada died at his home, in Bom Retiro, São Paulo, at the age of 79.
