= Pentecoste =

Municipality in Ceará, Brazil

Coordinates: 3°48′S 39°17′W

- Municipality
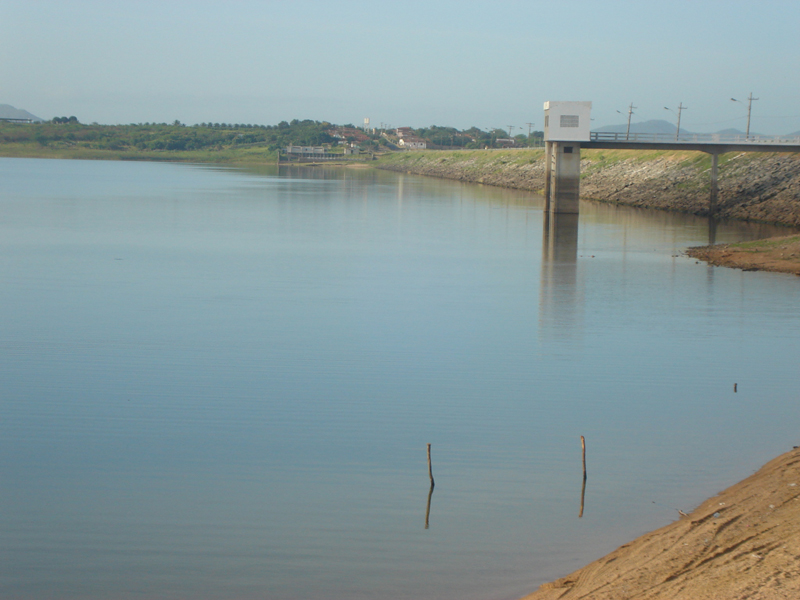

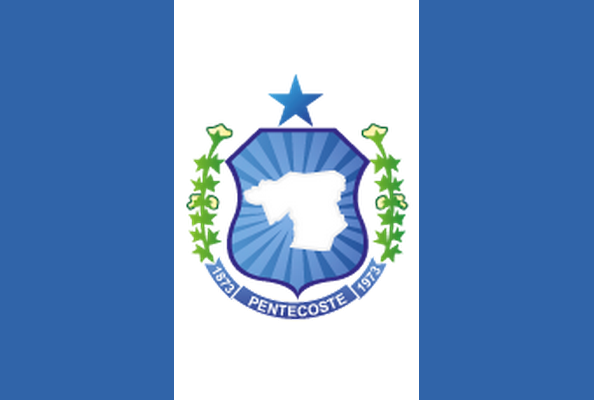
- Flag
- Interactive map of Pentecoste
- Country: Brazil
- Region: Nordeste
- State: Ceará
- Mesoregion: Noroeste Cearense

Population (2020)
  - Total: 37,900
- Time zone: UTC−3 (BRT)

Pentecoste is a municipality in the state of Ceará in the Northeast region of Brazil.

== Notable people ==
- Éderson (footballer, born 1989) Football player

== See also ==
- List of municipalities in Ceará
