= Rodolfo Betinotti =

Argentine footballer (1932–2022)

Personal information
- Full name: Rodolfo Carlos Betinotti
- Date of birth: 7 October 1932
- Date of death: 26 April 2022 (aged 89)
- Position: Defender

Senior career*
Years	Team	Apps	(Gls)
1952-1963	Atlanta		
1964-1965	All Boys		
1966-1967	Excursionistas		

International career
1959	Argentina	1	(0)
- * Club domestic league appearances and goals

Rodolfo Betinotti (7 October 1932 – 26 April 2022) was an Argentine footballer. He played in one match for the Argentina national football team in 1959. He was also part of Argentina's squad for the 1959 South American Championship that took place in Ecuador. Betinotti died on 26 April 2022, at the age of 89.
