= La Brea =

La Brea (Spanish for "the tar" or "the tar pits") may refer to:

== Los Angeles ==
- La Brea Avenue
- La Brea Bakery
- La Brea Tar Pits
- Park La Brea, Los Angeles, a large apartment community

== Elsewhere ==
- La Brea, Trinidad and Tobago, home to the Pitch Lake
  - La Brea (parliamentary constituency)
- La Brea District, in Peru

== Other ==
- La Brea (TV series), a 2021–2024 American drama series

== See also ==
- Lábrea, a municipality in Amazonas, Brazil
