= 1963 Campeonato Carioca =

Campeonato Carioca
- Season: 1963
- Champions: Flamengo
- Taça Brasil: Flamengo
- Matches: 156
- Goals: 424 (2.72 per match)
- Top goalscorer: Bianchini (Bangu) - 18 goals
- Biggest home win: Bangu 7-0 Madureira (October 12, 1963)
- Biggest away win: Canto do Rio 1-7 Olaria (July 21, 1963)
- Highest scoring: Canto do Rio 1-7 Olaria (July 21, 1963)

The 1963 edition of the Campeonato Carioca kicked off on June 30, 1963, and ended on December 15, 1963. It was organized by FCF (Federação Carioca de Futebol, or Carioca Football Federation). Thirteen teams participated. Flamengo won the title for the 14th time. No teams were relegated.

== System ==
The tournament would be disputed in a double round-robin format, with the team with the most points winning the title.

== Championship ==
Pos	Team	Pld	W	D	L	GF	GA	GD	Pts	Qualification or relegation
1	Flamengo	24	17	5	2	46	17	+29	39	Champions
2	Fluminense	24	16	6	2	48	10	+38	38	
3	Bangu	24	16	4	4	58	27	+31	36	
4	Botafogo	24	15	5	4	44	15	+29	35	
5	América	24	12	6	6	38	28	+10	30	
6	Vasco da Gama	24	11	7	6	39	23	+16	29	
7	São Cristóvão	24	9	3	12	25	38	−13	21	
8	Campo Grande	24	7	7	10	22	41	−19	21	
9	Olaria	24	7	5	12	32	35	−3	19	
10	Portuguesa	24	4	7	13	19	35	−16	15	
11	Bonsucesso	24	4	5	15	14	32	−18	13	
12	Canto do Rio	24	3	4	17	24	59	−35	10	
13	Madureira	24	2	2	20	15	64	−49	6	

Updated to match(es) played on December 15, 1963. Source: RSSSF.com
Rules for classification: 1) points; 2) goal difference; 3) wins; 4) number of goals scored.

== Final ==
Flamengo defeated Fluminense in the final. A world record for football, 194 603 spectators, were present in Maracanã stadium.
