= Clóvis (footballer, born 1937) =

Brazilian footballer (1937–2013)

Personal information
- Full name: Clóvis Pinheiro dos Santos
- Date of birth: 28 August 1937
- Place of birth: São José do Egito, Brazil
- Date of death: 2013 (aged 75)

International career
| Years | Team | Apps | (Gls) |
| 1959 | Brazil | 4 | (0) |

Clóvis Pinheiro dos Santos (28 August 1937 – 2013), known as just Clóvis, was a Brazilian footballer. He played in four matches for the Brazil national football team in 1959. He was also part of Brazil's squad for the 1959 South American Championship that took place in Ecuador. Clóvis died at the beginning of the year 2013, at the age of 75.
