= Bria (footballer) =

Brazilian footballer

Personal information
- Full name: Cosme Rodrigues de Melo
- Date of birth: 12 May 1928
- Place of birth: Santo Amaro da Purificação, Brazil
- Date of death: 25 August 2005 (aged 77)
- Place of death: Recife, Brazil
- Position: Defender

Senior career*
Years	Team	Apps	(Gls)
1948–1963	Sport Recife	556	
1963	América-PE		
- * Club domestic league appearances and goals as of 23 March 2024

Cosme Rodrigues de Melo (12 May 1928 – 25 August 2005), better known as Bria, was a Brazilian professional footballer who played as a defender.

== Career ==
Record holder for Sport Recife with 556 appearances, Bria played almost his entire career at the club, from 1948 to 1963 (for 14 years), winning the Pernambuco state championship on seven occasions. He ended his career at América in 1963.

== International career ==
Bria was called up for the 1959 South American Championship held in Ecuador, alongside other athletes who were playing in Pernambuco.

== Honours ==
Sport Recife

- Campeonato Pernambucano: 1949, 1953, 1955, 1956, 1958, 1961, 1962

== Death ==
Bria died after a heart attack on 25 August 2005, during a hemodialysis session.
