= Marolla =

Brazilian footballer

Personal information
- Full name: Fiordemundo Marolla Júnior
- Date of birth: 7 February 1961 (age 65)
- Place of birth: Jaú, Brazil
- Height: 1.85 m (6 ft 1 in)
- Position: Goalkeeper

Youth career
- XV de Jaú

Senior career*
| Years | Team | Apps | (Gls) |
| 1978–1980 | XV de Jaú | | |
| 1980–1985 | Santos | 282 | (0) |
| 1984 | → Colorado-PR (loan) | | |
| 1985–1990 | Atlético Paranaense | | |
| 1987 | → América-SP (loan) | | |
| 1990–1991 | Criciúma | | |
| 1991–1992 | Botafogo-SP | | |
| 1992 | Goiatuba | | |
| 1993 | Paulista | | |
| 1994 | Corinthians-PP | | |
| 1995 | Paulista | | |

International career
| 1979–1981 | Brazil U20 | | |
| 1980–1981 | Brazil | 2 | (0) |
- * Club domestic league appearances and goals as of 2 March 2024

Fiordemundo Marolla Júnior (born 7 February 1961), simply known as Marolla, is a Brazilian former professional footballer who played as a goalkeeper.

== Career ==
Revealed by XV de Jaú, he was one of the most promising goalkeepers in Brazil in the 1980s. He was signed by Santos FC, where he was a substitute for Uruguayan Rodolfo Rodriguez in winning the state championship in 1984. He also played for Colorado and Athletico Paranaense, where he went champion three times. In 1991 he was part of the Copa do Brasil champion squad with Criciúma, and champion of Goiás with the modest Goiatuba in 1992. He ended his career in 1995, at Paulista de Jundiaí.

== International career ==
For the national team, Marolla was part of the squad that competed in the 1979 South American U-20 Championship and twice in the Toulon Tournament, being two-time champion. In 1980, he joined the main Brazil team replacing Carlos Gallo during a friendly against Paraguay, and in 1981, once again as subistitute, this time replacing Waldir Peres against Ecuador.

== Honours ==
Santos

- Campeonato Paulista: 1984

Athletico Paranaense

- Campeonato Paranaense: 1985, 1988, 1990

Criciúma

- Copa do Brasil: 1991

Goiatuba

- Campeonato Goiano: 1992

Brazil U20

- Toulon Tournament: 1980, 1981
