= 1966 Torneio Rio-São Paulo =

Torneio Rio-São Paulo
- Season: 1966
- Champions: Botafogo (3rd title); Corinthians (4th title); Santos (4th title); Vasco da Gama (2nd title)
- Matches played: 45
- Goals scored: 130 (2.89 per match)
- Top goalscorer: Parada (Botafogo) – 8 goals
- Biggest home win: Botafogo 5–1 Corinthians (10 Mar)
- Biggest away win: Corinthians 0–3 Vasco da Gama (6 Mar)

The 1966 Torneio Rio São Paulo was the 19th edition of the Torneio Rio-São Paulo. It was disputed between 9 February to 29 March 1966.

== Participants ==
Team	City	Nº participations	Best result
Bangu	Rio de Janeiro	7	3rd (1951)
Botafogo	Rio de Janeiro	16	Champions: 1962, 1964 (shared)
Corinthians	(São Paulo (state)) São Paulo	19	Champions: 1950, 1953, 1954
Flamengo	Rio de Janeiro	18	Champions: 1961
Fluminense	Rio de Janeiro	18	Champions: 1957, 1960
Palmeiras	(São Paulo (state)) São Paulo	19	Champions: 1933, 1951, 1965
Portuguesa	(São Paulo (state)) São Paulo	19	Champions: 1952, 1955
Santos	(São Paulo (state)) Santos	15	Champions: 1959, 1963, 1964 (shared)
São Paulo	(São Paulo (state)) São Paulo	19	Runners-up: 1933, 1962
Vasco da Gama	Rio de Janeiro	19	Champions: 1958

== Format ==
The tournament were disputed in a single round-robin format, with the club with most points conquered being the champions.

== Tournament ==
Following is the summary of the 1966 Torneio Rio-São Paulo tournament:

Pos	Team	Pld	W	D	L	GF	GA	GD	Pts
1	Botafogo (C)	9	4	3	2	19	11	+8	11 (Note: Tied in points)
2	(São Paulo (state)) Corinthians (C)	9	5	1	3	15	15	0	11
3	(São Paulo (state)) Santos (C)	9	4	3	2	18	11	+7	11
4	Vasco da Gama (C)	9	5	1	3	12	11	+1	11
5	(São Paulo (state)) São Paulo	9	5	0	4	14	11	+3	10
6	(São Paulo (state)) Palmeiras	9	4	1	4	11	13	−2	9
7	Bangu	9	4	0	5	9	12	−3	8 (Note: Tied in points)
8	Flamengo	9	3	2	4	13	13	0	8
9	Fluminense	9	3	0	6	8	17	−9	6
10	(São Paulo (state)) Portuguesa	9	2	1	6	11	16	−5	5

Source: RSSSF
(C) Champions
Notes:

As there is no tiebreaker criteria for the points tie, a quadrangular involving Botafogo, Corinthians, Santos and Vasco should be played. However, due to the preparation of Brazil national football team to 1966 FIFA World Cup, the CBD decided to proclaim all four clubs as champions.

== Top scorers ==
Rank	Player	Club	Goals
1	Parada	Botafogo	8
2	Célio Taveira	Vasco da Gama	6
2	Silva Batuta	Flamengo	6
4	Ivair	Portuguesa	5
4	Jairzinho	Botafogo	5
4	Toninho Guerreiro	Santos	5
