= Zé Maria (footballer, born 1931) =

Brazilian footballer (1931–2021)

José Maria de Carvalho Sales
Personal information
- Full name: José Maria de Carvalho Sales
- Date of birth: 3 December 1931
- Place of birth: Belém, Brazil
- Date of death: 21 March 2021 (aged 89)
- Position: Midfielder

Senior career*
Years	Team	Apps	(Gls)
- Sport Recife
- Náutico

International career
1959	Brazil	3	(0)
- * Club domestic league appearances and goals

José Maria de Carvalho Sales (3 December 1931 – 21 March 2021), known as Zé Maria, was a Brazilian footballer who played as a midfielder. He made three appearances for the Brazil national team in 1959. He was also part of Brazil's squad for the 1959 South American Championship that took place in Ecuador. Zé Maria died on 21 March 2021, at the age of 89.
