= De María (footballer) =

Brazilian footballer (born 1896)

Personal information
- Full name: João de María
- Date of birth: 12 May 1896
- Place of birth: Rio de Janeiro, Brazil
- Position: Defender

International career
Years	Team	Apps	(Gls)
1920	Brazil	2	(0)

João de María (born 12 May 1896, date of death unknown), known as De María, was a Brazilian footballer. He played in two matches for the Brazil national football team in 1920. He was also part of Brazil's squad for the 1920 South American Championship.
