= Humberto Elgueta =

Chilean footballer (1904-1976)

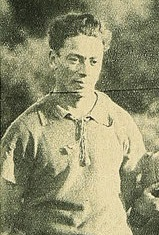

Personal information
- Full name: Humberto Elgueta Valdés
- Date of birth: 10 September 1904
- Place of birth: Santiago, Chile
- Date of death: 28 November 1976 (aged 72)
- Position: Midfielder

Senior career*
Years	Team	Apps	(Gls)
1930-?	Naval de Talcahuano		

International career
1930	Chile	1	(0)
- * Club domestic league appearances and goals

Humberto Elgueta Valdés (10 September 1904 – 28 November 1976) was a Chilean football midfielder.
