= Elias (footballer, born 1931) =

Brazilian footballer

Personal information
- Full name: Elias Soares de Oliveira
- Date of birth: 20 February 1931 (age 95)
- Place of birth: Recife, Brazil
- Position: Forward

International career
| Years | Team | Apps | (Gls) |
| 1959 | Brazil | 5 | (0) |

Elias Soares de Oliveira (born 20 February 1931) is a Brazilian footballer. He played in five matches for the Brazil national football team in 1959. He was also part of Brazil's squad for the 1959 South American Championship that took place in Ecuador.
