= Goiano (footballer, born 1935) =

Brazilian footballer

Personal information
- Full name: Clenílton Ataíde Cavalcante
- Date of birth: 24 September 1935 (age 91)

International career
Years	Team	Apps	(Gls)
1959	Brazil	3	(0)

Clenílton Ataíde Cavalcante (born 24 September 1935), known as Goiano, is a Brazilian footballer. He played in three matches for the Brazil national football team in 1959. He was also part of Brazil's squad for the 1959 South American Championship that took place in Ecuador.
