= Flecha (footballer) =

Brazilian footballer

Personal information
- Full name: Gilberto Alves de Souza
- Date of birth: 31 December 1946
- Place of birth: Porto Alegre, Brazil
- Date of death: 23 February 2022 (aged 75)
- Place of death: Viamão, Brazil
- Position: Right winger

Youth career
- Grêmio
- Internacional

Senior career*
Years	Team	Apps	(Gls)
1966	Avenida		
1966–1967	Caxias		
1968–1972	Grêmio	216	(48)
1972	→ Coritiba (loan)		
1973–1975	America-RJ		
1976–1977	Guarani		
1977–1978	Juventude		
1978	Figueirense		
1979–1980	Brasil de Pelotas		

International career
1976–1977	Brazil	5	(0)
- * Club domestic league appearances and goals as of 19 February 2024

Gilberto Alves de Souza (31 December 1946 – 23 February 2022), better known as Flecha, was a Brazilian professional footballer who played as a right winger.

== Career ==
Right winger, Flecha stood out mainly playing for Grêmio, where he made 216 appearances and scored 48 goals. He also had great spells in Coritiba, America-RJ and Guarani.

== International career ==
Flecha was called up to the Brazilian national team in 1976 and 1977, when he played for America-RJ. He disputed five official matches, in addition to an unofficial game against the Federal District team, when he scored a goal.

== Death ==
Flecha died on 23 February 2022, in the city of Viamão, at the age of 75.
