= Augusto Sisson =

Brazilian footballer (1894-1982)

Personal information
- Full name: Augusto Maria Sisson Filho
- Date of birth: 15 November 1894
- Place of birth: Niterói, Brazil
- Date of death: 26 March 1982 (aged 87)

International career
Years	Team	Apps	(Gls)
1920	Brazil	3	(0)

Augusto Maria Sisson Filho (15 November 1894 – 26 March 1982) was a Brazilian footballer. He played in three matches for the Brazil national football team in 1920. He was also part of Brazil's squad for the 1920 South American Championship.
