= Japonês =

Brazilian footballer

Personal information
- Full name: Adhemar Martins
- Date of birth: 9 December 1900

International career
Years	Team	Apps	(Gls)
1920	Brazil	2	(0)

Adhemar Martins, known as Japonês, (born 9 December 1900, date of death unknown) was a Brazilian footballer. He played in two matches for the Brazil national football team in 1920. He was also part of Brazil's squad for the 1920 South American Championship.
