= Waldemar (footballer) =

Brazilian footballer

Personal information
- Date of birth: 16 February 1936 (age 90)

International career
Years	Team	Apps	(Gls)
1959	Brazil	5	(0)

Waldemar Chiarelli (born 4 March 1936) is a Brazilian footballer. He played in five matches for the Brazil national football team in 1959. He was also part of Brazil's squad for the 1959 South American Championship that took place in Ecuador.
