= Tião (footballer, born 1936) =

Brazilian footballer

Personal information
- Full name: Sebastião Pereira dos Santos
- Date of birth: 11 May 1936 (age 90)

International career
Years	Team	Apps	(Gls)
1959	Brazil	3	(0)

Sebastião Pereira dos Santos (born 11 May 1936), better known as Tião, is a Brazilian footballer. He played in three matches for the Brazil national football team in 1959. He was also part of Brazil's squad for the 1959 South American Championship that took place in Ecuador.
