= Biu (footballer) =

Brazilian footballer (1936–2025)

Personal information
- Full name: Severino Rodrigues da Silva
- Date of birth: 27 March 1936
- Date of death: March 2025 (aged 88)
- Place of death: Vitória de Santo Antão, Pernambuco, Brazil

International career
Years	Team	Apps	(Gls)
1959	Brazil	5	(0)

Severino Rodrigues da Silva (27 March 1936 – March 2025), commonly known as Biu, was a Brazilian footballer. He played in five matches for the Brazil national football team in 1959. He was also part of Brazil's squad for the 1959 South American Championship that took place in Ecuador. Biu died in March 2025, a few weeks short of his 89th birthday.
