= Givaldo (footballer) =

Brazilian footballer (born 1935)

Personal information
- Full name: Givaldo Bezerra Cordeiro
- Date of birth: 12 March 1935 (age 91)

International career
Years	Team	Apps	(Gls)
1959	Brazil	5	(0)

Givaldo Bezerra Cordeiro (born 12 March 1935), known as just Givaldo, is a Brazilian footballer. He played in five matches for the Brazil national football team in 1959. He was also part of Brazil's squad for the 1959 South American Championship that took place in Ecuador.
