= Copa Bernardo O'Higgins =

- Organiser(s): (Brazil) CBF (Chile) FFCH
- Founded: 1955
- Abolished: 1966; 59 years ago
- Region: Brazil; Chile
- Teams: 2
- Related competitions: Roca Cup; Copa Río Branco; Taça Oswaldo Cruz
- Last champions: Brazil and Chile (1966) shared
- Most championships: Brazil (4 titles)

Copa Bernardo O'Higgins (English: Bernardo O'Higgins Cup) was a national football tournament disputed between Brazil and Chile, from 1955 to 1966. The competition, played on a two-legged format, was similar to other tournaments played at the time, such as the Roca Cup between Argentina and Brazil.

The cup's name was a tribute to Bernardo O'Higgins, a figure of great importance in Chile's independence, and considered one of the liberators of South America during the Spanish occupation in the colonial period.

== List of champions ==
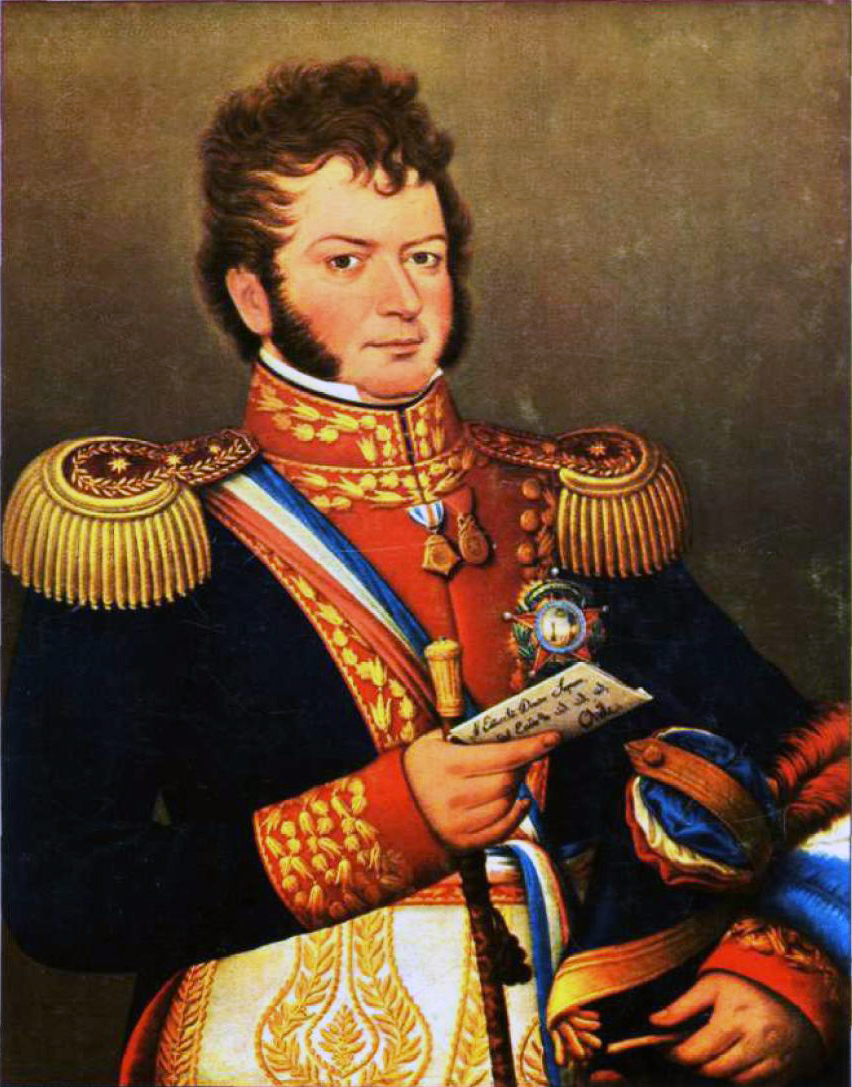
The cup was named as a tribute to Chilean military and politician Bernardo O'Higgins

| Ed. | Year | Host | Champion | 1st. leg | 2nd. leg | Result (points) |
|---|---|---|---|---|---|---|
| 1 | 1955 | Brazil | Brazil | 1–1 | 2–1 | 2–1 |
| 2 | 1957 | Chile | Chile | 1–0 | 1–1 | 2–1 |
| 3 | 1959 | Brazil | Brazil | 7–0 | 1–0 | 4–0 |
| 4 | 1961 | Chile | Brazil | 1–2 | 0–1 | 4–0 |
| 5 | 1966 | Chile | Chile (Note: Title shared) | 0–1 | 2–1 | 2–2 (g.d.) |
| 5 | 1966 | Chile | Brazil | 0–1 | 2–1 | 2–2 (g.d.) |

== Match details ==
=== 1955 ===
18 Sep
First leg

| Brazil | 1–1 | Chile |
|---|---|---|
| Pinheiro | Report | Ramírez |

Maracanã, Rio de Janeiro
Referee: Charles Williams

20 Sep
Second leg

| Brazil | 2–1 | Chile |
|---|---|---|
| Maurinho; Álvaro | Report | Hormazabal |

Pacaembu, São Paulo
Referee: Harry Davis

=== 1957 ===
15 Sep
First leg

| Chile | 1–0 | Brazil |
|---|---|---|
| Meléndez | Report |

Estadio Nacional, Santiago
Referee: Walter Manning

18 Sep
Second leg

| Chile | 1–1 | Brazil |
|---|---|---|
| Fernández 102' | Report | Mattos 15' |

Estadio Nacional, Santiago
Referee: Danor Morales

=== 1959 ===
17 Sep
First leg

| Brazil | 7–0 | Chile |
|---|---|---|
| Pelé; Dorval; Quarentinha; Dino Sani | Report |

Maracanã, Rio de Janeiro
Referee: Alberto da Gama

20 Sep
Second leg

| Brazil | 1–0 | Chile |
|---|---|---|
| Quarentinha | Report |

Pacaembu, São Paulo
Referee: Joao Etzel

=== 1961 ===
7 May
First leg

| Chile | 1–2 | Brazil |
|---|---|---|
| Soto | Report | Garrincha; Didi |

Estadio Nacional, Santiago
Referee: Carlos Robles

11 May
Second leg

| Chile | 0–1 | Brazil |
|---|---|---|
| | Report | Gérson |

Estadio Nacional, Santiago
Referee: Carlos Robles

=== 1966 ===
17 Apr
First leg

| Chile | 0–1 | Brazil |
|---|---|---|
| | Report | João Carlos |

Estadio Nacional, Santiago
Referee: Kevin Howley

20 Apr
Second leg

| Chile | 2–1 | Brazil |
|---|---|---|
| Reinoso; Valdés | Report | João Carlos |

Estadio Sausalito, Viña del Mar
Referee: Kevin Howley

== All-time top scorers ==
Pelé and Quarentinha are the all-time top-scorers in the competition with three goals each. Pelé is the only player to have scored a hat-trick in the tournament (1959 first leg at Maracanã in Brazil).
