= 1937 South American Championship squads =

List of footballers

The following squads were named for the 1937 South American Championship that took place in Argentina.

== Argentina ==
Head coach: (Argentina) Manuel Seoane

No.	Pos.	Player	Date of birth (age)	Caps	Goals	Club
—	GK	Fernando Bello	29 November 1910 (aged 26)	4	0	(Argentine Football Association) Independiente
—	GK	Juan Estrada	28 October 1912 (aged 24)	2	0	(Argentine Football Association) Huracán
—	DF	Bartolomé Colombo	24 August 1916 (aged 20)	0	0	(Argentine Football Association) Argentinos Juniors
—	DF	Alberto Cuello	23 September 1909 (aged 27)	4	0	(Argentine Football Association) River Plate
—	DF	Luis Fazio	23 April 1911 (aged 25)	0	0	(Argentine Football Association) Independiente
—	DF	Juan Carlos Iribarren	27 March 1901 (aged 35)	12	0	(Argentine Football Association) Chacarita Juniors
—	DF	Celestino Martínez	7 July 1914 (aged 22)	0	0	(Argentine Football Association) Independiente
—	DF	Oscar Tarrío	7 July 1914 (aged 22)	8	0	(Argentine Football Association) San Lorenzo
—	MF	Ernesto Lazzatti	25 September 1915 (aged 21)	1	0	(Argentine Football Association) Boca Juniors
—	MF	Antonio Sastre	27 April 1911 (aged 25)	8	0	(Argentine Football Association) Independiente
—	FW	Alejandro Scopelli	12 May 1908 (aged 28)	5	2	(Argentine Football Association) Racing Club
—	FW	Roberto Cherro	23 February 1907 (aged 29)	13	13	(Argentine Football Association) Boca Juniors
—	FW	Vicente de la Mata	15 January 1918 (aged 18)	0	0	(Argentine Football Association) Central Córdoba (R)
—	FW	Bernabé Ferreyra	12 February 1909 (aged 27)	2	0	(Argentine Football Association) River Plate
—	MF	Enrique García	20 November 1912 (aged 24)	4	0	(Argentine Football Association) Racing Club
—	FW	Enrico Guaita	11 July 1910 (aged 26)	12	6	(Argentine Football Association) Racing Club
—	MF	José María Minella	6 August 1909 (aged 27)	7	0	(Argentine Football Association) River Plate
—	MF	Carlos Peucelle	13 September 1908 (aged 28)	13	8	(Argentine Football Association) River Plate
—	FW	Francisco Varallo	5 February 1910 (aged 26)	10	3	(Argentine Football Association) Boca Juniors
—	FW	Alberto Zozaya	13 April 1908 (aged 28)	4	3	(Argentine Football Association) Estudiantes (LP)
—	FW	Raúl Emeal	16 January 1916 (aged 20)	0	0	(Argentine Football Association) Ferro Carril Oeste

== Brazil ==
Head coach: (Brazil) Adhemar Pimenta

No.	Pos.	Player	Date of birth (age)	Caps	Goals	Club
—	MF	Afonsinho	8 March 1914 (aged 22)	0	0	(Brazilian Football Confederation) São Cristóvão
—	FW	Bahia	2 December 1910 (aged 26)	0	0	(Brazilian Football Confederation) Madureira
—	MF	Brandão	21 April 1911 (aged 25)	0	0	(Brazilian Football Confederation) Corinthians
—	MF	Britto	6 May 1914 (aged 22)	0	0	(Brazilian Football Confederation) Corinthians
—	MF	Canalli	3 March 1910 (aged 26)	3	0	(Brazilian Football Confederation) Botafogo
—	FW	Cardeal	7 November 1912 (aged 24)	0	0	(Brazilian Football Confederation) 9º Regimento
—	FW	Carreiro	24 November 1911 (aged 25)	0	0	(Brazilian Football Confederation) São Cristóvão
—	DF	Carnera	22 November 1908 (aged 28)	0	0	(Brazilian Football Confederation) Palestra Itália
—	FW	Carvalho Leite	25 June 1912 (aged 24)	5	3	(Brazilian Football Confederation) Botafogo
—	DF	Jaú	17 December 1909 (aged 27)	0	0	(Brazilian Football Confederation) Corinthians
—	GK	Jurandir	26 April 1912 (aged 24)	0	0	(Brazilian Football Confederation) Palestra Itália
—	FW	Luisinho	29 March 1911 (aged 25)	1	0	(Brazilian Football Confederation) Palestra Itália
—	DF	Nariz	8 February 1912 (aged 24)	0	0	(Brazilian Football Confederation) Botafogo
—	FW	Niginho	12 February 1912 (aged 24)	0	0	(Brazilian Football Confederation) Palestra Itália
—	FW	Patesko	12 November 1910 (aged 26)	3	0	(Brazilian Football Confederation) Botafogo
—	GK	Rey	19 March 1912 (aged 24)	0	0	(Brazilian Football Confederation) Vasco da Gama
—	FW	Roberto	20 June 1912 (aged 24)	0	0	(Brazilian Football Confederation) São Cristóvão
—	FW	Tim	20 February 1915 (aged 21)	0	0	(Brazilian Football Confederation) Fluminense
—	MF	Tunga	17 December 1908 (aged 28)	0	0	(Brazilian Football Confederation) Palestra Itália
—	MF	Alberto Zarzur	22 December 1912 (aged 24)	0	0	(Brazilian Football Confederation) Vasco da Gama

== Chile ==
Head coach: (Uruguay) Pedro Mazullo

No.	Pos.	Player	Date of birth (age)	Caps	Goals	Club
—	FW	Manuel Arancibia	25 May 1908 (aged 28)	0	0	(Football Federation of Chile) Bádminton
—	FW	José Avendaño	2 August 1912 (aged 24)	2	0	(Football Federation of Chile) Magallanes
—	FW	Moisés Avilés	12 February 1909 (aged 27)	1	0	(Football Federation of Chile) Audax Italiano
—	DF	Mario Baeza	28 April 1916 (aged 20)	0	0	(Football Federation of Chile) Magallanes
—	GK	Luis Cabrera		0	0	(Football Federation of Chile) Audax Italiano
—	FW	Arturo Carmona	28 September 1909 (aged 27)	3	1	(Football Federation of Chile) Magallanes
—	DF	Jorge Córdova	5 April 1913 (aged 23)	0	0	(Football Federation of Chile) Magallanes
—	DF	Ascanio Cortés	5 July 1914 (aged 22)	3	0	(Football Federation of Chile) Audax Italiano
—	MF	Guillermo Gornall	31 August 1907 (aged 29)	3	0	(Football Federation of Chile) Audax Italiano
—	MF	Juan Montero	1 January 1910 (aged 26)	0	0	(Football Federation of Chile) Colo-Colo
—	FW	Tomás Ojeda	20 April 1910 (aged 26)	2	0	(Football Federation of Chile) Audax Italiano
—	MF	Luis Ponce	6 June 1910 (aged 26)	0	0	(Football Federation of Chile) Magallanes
—	DF	Guillermo Riveros	10 February 1906 (aged 30)	5	0	(Football Federation of Chile) Audax Italiano
—	MF	Eduardo Schneeberger	27 January 1911 (aged 25)	1	0	(Football Federation of Chile) Colo-Colo
—	GK	Eugenio Soto	28 December 1909 (aged 26)	0	0	(Football Federation of Chile) Magallanes
—	FW	Raúl Toro	21 February 1911 (aged 25)	0	0	(Football Federation of Chile) Santiago Wanderers
—	FW	Guillermo Torres	21 September 1909 (aged 27)	1	0	(Football Federation of Chile) Santiago Wanderers

== Paraguay ==
Head coach: (Paraguay) Manuel Fleitas Solich

No.	Pos.	Player	Date of birth (age)	Caps	Goals	Club
—	MF	Francisco Aguirre	30 November 1907 (aged 29)	3	0	(Paraguayan Football Association) Olimpia
—	FW	Juan Simón Amarilla		0	0	(Paraguayan Football Association)
—	MF	Diego Ayala		0	0	(Paraguayan Football Association) Libertad
—	FW	Marcial Barrios	26 June 1919 (aged 17)	0	0	(Paraguayan Football Association) Olimpia
—	FW	Adolfo Erico		0	0	(Paraguayan Football Association)
—	FW	Eligio Esquivel		0	0	(Paraguayan Football Association)
—	FW	Rogelio Etcheverry		0	0	(Paraguayan Football Association)
—	FW	Martín Flor		0	0	(Paraguayan Football Association)
—	FW	Aurelio González	25 September 1905 (aged 31)	5	5	(Paraguayan Football Association) Olimpia
—	GK	Manuel González		0	0	(Paraguayan Football Association)
—	DF	Antonio Invernizzi		0	0	(Paraguayan Football Association) Libertad
—	DF	Juan Félix Lezcano		0	0	(Paraguayan Football Association)
—	FW	Raúl Núñez Velloso		0	0	(Paraguayan Football Association)
—	DF	Quiterio Olmedo	21 December 1907 (aged 29)	5	0	(Paraguayan Football Association) Nacional
—	FW	Amadeo Ortega	19 April 1905 (aged 31)	0	0	(Argentine Football Association) Atlanta
—	DF	Miguel Ortega	5 July 1917 (aged 19)	0	0	(Argentine Football Association) Gimnasia y Esgrima (LP)
—	MF	Lorenzo Romero		0	0	(Paraguayan Football Association)
—	FW	Flaminio Silva		0	0	(Paraguayan Football Association) Olimpia
—	FW	Alberto Vera		0	0	(Paraguayan Football Association)

== Peru ==
Head coach: (Peru) Alberto Denegri

No.	Pos.	Player	Date of birth (age)	Caps	Goals	Club
—	FW	Jorge Alcalde	5 December 1911 (aged 25)	1	0	(Peruvian Football Federation) Sport Boys
—	MF	Teodoro Alcalde	20 September 1913 (aged 23)	0	0	(Peruvian Football Federation) Sport Boys
—	FW	Andrés Álvarez	10 September 1916 (aged 20)	0	0	(Peruvian Football Federation) Sport Boys
—	MF	Vicente Arce	22 January 1910 (aged 26)	3	0	(Peruvian Football Federation) Universitario de Deportes
—	MF	Segundo Castillo	17 July 1917 (aged 19)	2	0	(Peruvian Football Federation) Sport Boys
—	DF	Ricardo del Río		0	0	(Peruvian Football Federation)
—	DF	Arturo Fernández	3 February 1910 (aged 26)	5	0	(Peruvian Football Federation) Universitario de Deportes
—	FW	Teodoro Fernández	20 May 1913 (aged 23)	5	7	(Peruvian Football Federation) Universitario de Deportes
—	GK	Juan Honores	24 March 1915 (aged 21)	0	0	(Peruvian Football Federation) Universitario de Deportes
—	GK	Marcos Huby	1 January 1910 (aged 26)	0	0	(Peruvian Football Federation) Atlético Chalaco
—	FW	Pedro Ibáñez	29 May 1912 (aged 24)	0	0	(Peruvian Football Federation) Sport Boys
—	DF	Orestes Jordán	21 November 1913 (aged 23)	2	0	(Peruvian Football Federation) Universitario de Deportes
—	FW	José María Lavalle	5 June 1911 (aged 25)	8	0	(Peruvian Football Federation) Alianza Lima
—	FW	Adelfo Magallanes	29 August 1910 (aged 26)	2	0	(Peruvian Football Federation) Alianza Lima
—	FW	José Morales	15 March 1910 (aged 26)	5	0	(Peruvian Football Federation) Alianza Lima
—	FW	Arturo Paredes	6 October 1913 (aged 23)	0	0	(Peruvian Football Federation) Sport Boys
—	MF	Carlos Portal	11 April 1911 (aged 25)	0	0	(Peruvian Football Federation) Sport Boys
—	DF	Alberto Soria	10 March 1906 (aged 30)	1	0	(Peruvian Football Federation) Universitario de Deportes
—	MF	Carlos Tovar	2 April 1914 (aged 22)	4	0	(Peruvian Football Federation) Universitario de Deportes
—	GK	Juan Humberto Valdivieso	6 May 1910 (aged 26)	6	0	(Peruvian Football Federation) Alianza Lima
—	FW	Alejandro Villanueva	4 June 1908 (aged 28)	9	5	(Peruvian Football Federation) Alianza Lima

== Uruguay ==
Head coach: (Uruguay) Alberto Suppici

No.	Pos.	Player	Date of birth (age)	Caps	Goals	Club
—	MF	Raymundo Andriolo		0	0	(Uruguayan Football Association) Nacional
—	GK	Enrique Ballestrero	18 January 1905 (aged 31)	15	0	(Uruguayan Football Association) Peñarol
—	GK	Juan Bautista Besuzzo	18 January 1913 (aged 23)	2	0	(Uruguayan Football Association) Montevideo Wanderers
—	FW	Ulises Borges		0	0	(Uruguayan Football Association) Rampla Juniors
—	DF	Avelino Cadilla	1 January 1918 (aged 18)	0	0	(Uruguayan Football Association) River Plate
—	DF	Adelaido Camaití		0	0	(Uruguayan Football Association) Peñarol
—	MF	Rodolfo Carreras		2	0	(Uruguayan Football Association) Central Español
—	MF	Braulio Castro	20 March 1913 (aged 23)	6	0	(Uruguayan Football Association) Peñarol
—	MF	Galileo Chanes	28 March 1917 (aged 19)	1	0	(Uruguayan Football Association) Peñarol
—	FW	Oscar Chirimini	28 March 1917 (aged 19)	0	0	(Uruguayan Football Association) River Plate
—	MF	Eugenio Galvalisi	15 November 1915 (aged 21)	2	0	(Uruguayan Football Association) Rampla Juniors
—	FW	Eduardo Ithurbide	10 March 1908 (aged 28)	3	0	(Uruguayan Football Association) Nacional
—	MF	Carlos Martínez		0	0	(Uruguayan Football Association) Rampla Juniors
—	DF	Agenor Muñiz	2 February 1910 (aged 26)	8	0	(Uruguayan Football Association) Montevideo Wanderers
—	DF	Miguel Juan Olivera		0	0	(Uruguayan Football Association) River Plate
—	FW	Juan Píriz	1 January 1908 (aged 28)	10	2	(Uruguayan Football Association) Defensor Sporting
—	DF	Agustín Prado		0	0	(Uruguayan Football Association) Bella Vista
—	DF	José Rosselli		0	0	(Uruguayan Football Association) Sud América
—	DF	Arturo Seoane	24 May 1913 (aged 23)	1	0	(Uruguayan Football Association) Montevideo Wanderers
—	FW	Severino Varela	14 September 1913 (aged 23)	3	0	(Uruguayan Football Association) Peñarol
—	MF	Segundo Villadóniga	6 November 1915 (aged 21)	1	0	(Uruguayan Football Association) Peñarol
