= 1923 South American Championship squads =

List of footballers

The following are the squad lists for the countries that played in the 1923 South American Championship held in Uruguay. The participating countries were Argentina, Brazil, Paraguay and Uruguay. The teams plays in a single round-robin tournament, earning two points for a win, one point for a draw, and zero points for a loss.

== Argentina ==
Head Coach: (Argentina) Ángel Vázquez (Note: Some sources indicate that Vázquez was appointed in 1924.)

No.	Pos.	Player	Date of birth (age)	Caps	Goals	Club
—	FW	Vicente Aguirre	22 January 1901 (aged 22)	0	0	(Argentine Football Association) Central Córdoba (R)
—	DF	Ludovico Bidoglio	5 February 1900 (aged 23)	6	0	(Argentine Football Association) Boca Juniors
—	GK	Federico Cancino		0	0	(Argentine Football Association) Alvear
—	DF	Juan Carlos Iribarren	27 March 1901 (aged 22)	5	0	(Argentine Football Association) Argentinos Juniors
—	FW	Adán Loizo		4	0	(Argentine Football Association) Huracán
—	DF	Ángel Médici	20 December 1897 (aged 25)	7	0	(Argentine Football Association) Boca Juniors
—	FW	Antonio de Miguel	25 June 1899 (aged 24)	5	0	(Argentine Football Association) Newell's Old Boys
—	FW	Cesáreo Onzari	1 February 1903 (aged 20)	4	1	(Argentine Football Association) Huracán
—	FW	Blas Saruppo	25 July 1895 (aged 28)	6	2	(Argentine Football Association) Sportivo Barracas
—	MF	Emilio Solari	4 January 1900 (aged 23)	15	0	(Argentine Football Association) Nueva Chicago
—	GK	Américo Tesoriere	18 March 1899 (aged 24)	24	0	(Argentine Football Association) Boca Juniors
—	MF	Luis Vaccaro	6 November 1898 (aged 24)	1	0	(Argentine Football Association) Argentinos Juniors

== Brazil ==
Head coach: (Brazil) Chico Netto

No.	Pos.	Player	Date of birth (age)	Caps	Goals	Club
—	DF	Alemão	21 January 1904 (aged 19)	0	0	(Brazilian Football Confederation) Botafogo (RJ)
—	FW	Amaro	11 October 1901 (aged 22)	0	0	(Brazilian Football Confederation) Goytacaz
—	FW	Coelho	4 May 1902 (aged 21)	0	0	(Brazilian Football Confederation) Fluminense
—	GK	David		0	0	(Brazilian Football Confederation) Goytacaz
—	MF	Dino I	21 September 1901 (aged 22)	3	0	(Brazilian Football Confederation) Flamengo
—	MF	Hermógenes	4 November 1908 (aged 14)	0	0	(Brazilian Football Confederation) América (RJ)
—	FW	Mário Seixas	22 April 1902 (aged 21)	0	0	(Brazilian Football Confederation) Americano
—	DF	Mica	15 November 1904 (aged 18)	0	0	(Brazilian Football Confederation) Botafogo (B)
—	GK	Nélson	12 August 1898 (aged 25)	0	0	(Brazilian Football Confederation) Vasco da Gama
—	MF	Nesi	15 November 1902 (aged 20)	2	0	(Brazilian Football Confederation) São Cristóvão
—	FW	Nilo	3 April 1903 (aged 20)	0	0	(Brazilian Football Confederation) SC Brasil
—	FW	Paschoal	24 May 1900 (aged 23)	0	0	(Brazilian Football Confederation) Vasco da Gama
—	DF	Pennaforte	19 April 1905 (aged 18)	0	0	(Brazilian Football Confederation) Flamengo
—	DF	Soda	2 March 1901 (aged 22)	0	0	(Brazilian Football Confederation) Americano
—	FW	Torteroli	24 March 1899 (aged 24)	0	0	(Brazilian Football Confederation) Vasco da Gama
—	FW	Zezé I	2 May 1899 (aged 24)	8	1	(Brazilian Football Confederation) Fluminense

== Paraguay ==
Head Coach: n/a (Note: No data about the coach.)

No.	Pos.	Player	Date of birth (age)	Caps	Goals	Club
—	GK	Modesto Denis	9 March 1901 (aged 22)	5	0	(Paraguayan Football Association) Nacional
—	GK	Manuel Recalde		0	0	(Paraguayan Football Association) Libertad
—	DF	César Mena Porta		4	0	(Paraguayan Football Association) Olimpia
—	DF	Gaspar Nessi		0	0	(Paraguayan Football Association) Libertad
—	DF	Venancio Paredes		8	0	(Paraguayan Football Association) Guaraní
—	DF	Segundo Gorostiaga		0	0	(Paraguayan Football Association) Libertad
—	MF	Luciano Capdevila		5	0	(Paraguayan Football Association) Cerro Porteño
—	MF	Roque Centurión Miranda		5	0	(Paraguayan Football Association) Guaraní
—	MF	Eusebio Díaz	21 June 1898 (aged 25)	0	0	(Paraguayan Football Association) Guaraní
—	FW	Carlos Elizeche		1	1	(Paraguayan Football Association) Atlántida
—	FW	Luis Fretes		3	1	(Paraguayan Football Association) Guaraní
—	FW	Ildefonso López		7	2	(Paraguayan Football Association) Guaraní
—	FW	Óscar López		0	0	(Paraguayan Football Association)
—	FW	Alejandro Miranda		0	0	(Paraguayan Football Association) Guaraní
—	FW	Gerardo Rivas		8	2	(Paraguayan Football Association) Libertad
—	FW	Agustín Zelada		0	0	(Paraguayan Football Association)

== Uruguay ==
Head Coach: (Uruguay) Leonardo de Lucca

No.	Pos.	Player	Date of birth (age)	Caps	Goals	Club
—	MF	José Leandro Andrade	22 November 1901 (aged 21)	1	0	(Uruguayan Football Association) Bella Vista
—	GK	Pedro Casella	31 October 1898 (aged 24)	4	0	(Uruguayan Football Association) Belgrano
—	FW	Pedro Cea	1 September 1900 (aged 23)	0	0	(Uruguayan Football Association) Lito
—	MF	Pedro Etchegoyen	1 January 1895 (aged 28)	0	0	(Uruguayan Football Association) Liverpool
—	MF	Alfredo Ghierra	31 August 1891 (aged 32)	0	0	(Uruguayan Football Association) Defensor Sporting
—	GK	Andrés Mazali	22 July 1902 (aged 21)	0	0	(Uruguayan Football Association) Nacional
—	DF	José Nasazzi	24 March 1901 (aged 22)	0	0	(Uruguayan Football Association) Bella Vista
—	FW	Ladislao Pérez		0	0	(Uruguayan Football Association) Montevideo Wanderers
—	FW	Pedro Petrone	11 May 1905 (aged 18)	0	0	(Uruguayan Football Association) Charley
—	FW	Ángel Romano	2 August 1893 (aged 30)	54	22	(Uruguayan Football Association) Nacional
—	FW	Héctor Scarone	26 November 1898 (aged 24)	21	10	(Uruguayan Football Association) Nacional
—	FW	Pascual Somma	2 February 1891 (aged 32)	37	2	(Uruguayan Football Association) Nacional
—	MF	Humberto Tomassina	12 September 1898 (aged 25)	0	0	(Uruguayan Football Association) Liverpool
—	FW	Santos Urdinarán	30 March 1900 (aged 23)	1	0	(Uruguayan Football Association) Nacional
—	DF	Fermín Uriarte	1 January 1902 (aged 21)	4	0	(Uruguayan Football Association) Lito
—	MF	José Vidal	15 December 1896 (aged 26)	0	0	(Uruguayan Football Association) Belgrano
—	MF	Pedro Zingone	20 July 1898 (aged 25)	1	0	(Uruguayan Football Association) Lito
