= List of Brazil international footballers (6–19 caps) =

The Brazil national football team represents the country of Brazil in international association football. It is fielded by the Brazilian Football Confederation (CBF), the governing body of football in Brazil, and competes as a member of CONMEBOL, which encompasses the countries of South America.

== Key ==
Positions key
GK	Goalkeeper
DF	Defender
MF	Midfielder
FW	Forward

Player
This colour background and the * symbol indicate that the player is currently active at the club level.
Position
Playing positions are listed according to the player's primary position while playing for the national team.
Caps and goals
Caps and goals comprise all those in official "A" international matches as recognised by the CBF. This includes competitive matches (FIFA World Cup qualifying and final tournaments, FIFA Confederations Cup, CONCACAF Gold Cup, etc.) and international friendly matches.

== Players ==
Brazil national football team players with between 6 and 19 caps
Player	Position	Caps	Goals	Debut		Last or most recent match		Pos. ref.
Player	Position	Caps	Goals	Date	Opponent	Date	Opponent	Pos. ref.
Leônidas; Leônidas da Silva	FW	19	21	4 December 1932	Uruguay	29 January 1946	Paraguay	
Afonsinho; Affonso Guimarães da Silva	MF	19	1	27 December 1936	Peru	5 February 1942	Paraguay	
Chico; Francisco Aramburu	MF	19	8	16 December 1945	Argentina	16 July 1950	Uruguay	
Édson Boaro; Édson Boaro	DF	19	0	8 June 1983	Portugal	6 June 1986	Algeria	
Walter Casagrande; Walter Casagrande Júnior	FW	19	8	25 April 1985	Colombia	12 June 1986	Northern Ireland	
Márcio Amoroso; Márcio Amoroso dos Santos	FW	19	9	29 March 1995	Honduras	30 April 2003	Mexico	
Júnior; Jenílson Ângelo de Souza	DF	19	1	18 December 1996	Bosnia and Herzegovina	19 November 2003	Uruguay	
Renan Lodi * Renan Augusto Lodi dos Santos	DF	19	0	10 October 2019	Senegal	16 November 2023	Colombia	
Heleno de Freitas; Heleno de Freitas	FW	18	14	18 May 1944	Uruguay	4 April 1948	Uruguay	
Augusto da Costa; Augusto da Costa	DF	18	1	29 March 1947	Uruguay	16 July 1950	Uruguay	
Francisco Rodrigues; Francisco Rodrigues	FW	18	5	7 May 1950	Paraguay	20 September 1955	Chile	
Chico Formiga; Francisco Ferreira de Aguiar	DF	18	0	20 September 1955	Chile	17 September 1959	Chile	
Édson dos Santos; Édson dos Santos	DF	18	0	12 June 1956	Paraguay	27 December 1959	Ecuador	
Altair; Altair Gomes de Figueiredo	DF	18	0	20 September 1959	Chile	15 July 1966	Hungary	
Getúlio; Getúlio Costa de Oliveira	DF	18	1	30 July 1975	Venezuela	8 July 1981	Spain	
Edevaldo; Edevaldo de Freitas	DF	18	1	30 October 1980	Paraguay	2 July 1982	Argentina	
Nelsinho; Nélson Luiz Kerchner	DF	18	1	19 May 1987	England	12 September 1990	Spain	
Giovanni; Giovanni Silva de Oliveira	MF	18	6	17 May 1995	Israel	13 November 1999	Spain	
Gabriel Barbosa * Gabriel Barbosa Almeida	FW	18	5	29 May 2016	Panama	27 January 2022	Ecuador	
Arthur Friedenreich; Arthur Friedenreich	FW	17	8	20 September 1914	Argentina	1 August 1930	France	
Ely; Ely do Amparo	MF	17	0	1 April 1947	Uruguay	19 March 1953	Peru	
Pinga; José Lázaro Robles	MF	17	10	7 May 1950	Paraguay	13 November 1955	Paraguay	
Pinheiro; João Carlos Batista Pinheiro	DF	17	1	6 April 1952	Mexico	18 September 1955	Chile	
Chinesinho; Sidney Colônia da Cunha	MF	17	8	8 March 1956	Mexico	29 June 1961	Paraguay	
Zequinha; José Ferreira Franco	MF	17	2	29 June 1960	Chile	7 September 1965	Uruguay	
Djalma Dias; Djalma Pereira Dias Júnior	DF	17	0	12 May 1962	Wales	31 August 1969	Paraguay	
Flávio Minuano; Flávio Almeida da Fonseca	FW	17	7	3 March 1963	Paraguay	28 July 1968	Paraguay	
Paulo Borges; Paulo Luís Borges	MF	17	3	18 May 1966	Wales	6 November 1968	World XI	
Valdomiro; Valdomiro Vaz Franco	MF	17	3	27 May 1973	Bolivia	20 March 1977	Paraguay	
Toninho; Antônio Dias dos Santos	DF	17	0	28 April 1976	Uruguay	31 October 1979	Paraguay	
Luiz Carlos Winck; Luís Carlos Coelho Winck	DF	17	1	25 April 1985	Colombia	6 June 1993	United States	
João Paulo; Sérgio Donizete Luís	MF	17	4	23 May 1987	Republic of Ireland	11 September 1991	Wales	
Cris; Cristiano Marques Gomes	DF	17	1	1 July 2001	Uruguay	17 November 2009	Oman	
Adriano; Adriano Correia Claro	DF	17	0	13 July 2003	Mexico	6 February 2013	England	
Alex; Alex Rodrigo Dias da Costa	DF	17	0	13 July 2003	Mexico	26 March 2008	Sweden	
Sandro; Sandro Raniere Guimarães Cordeiro	MF	17	1	9 September 2009	Chile	16 October 2012	Japan	
Leandro Damião; Leandro Damião da Silva dos Santos	FW	17	3	27 March 2011	Scotland	2 June 2013	England	
José Augusto Brandão; José Augusto Brandão	MF	16	0	27 December 1936	Peru	5 February 1942	Paraguay	
Tim; Elba de Pádua Lima	MF	16	1	27 December 1936	Peru	5 February 1942	Paraguay	
Noronha; Alfredo Eduardo Ribeiro Mena Barreto de Freitas Noronha	DF	16	0	14 May 1944	Uruguay	28 June 1950	Switzerland	
Brandãozinho; Antenor Lucas	MF	16	0	6 April 1952	Mexico	27 June 1954	Hungary	
Canhoteiro; José Ribamar de Oliveira	MF	16	1	17 November 1955	Paraguay	20 September 1959	Chile	
Roberto Belangero; Roberto Belangero	MF	16	0	17 November 1955	Paraguay	18 May 1958	Bulgaria	
Palhinha; Vanderley Eustáquio de Oliveira	MF	16	4	27 May 1973	Bolivia	31 October 1979	Paraguay	
Paulo César Carpegiani; Paulo Cezar Carpegiani	MF	16	0	31 March 1974	Mexico	31 October 1979	Paraguay	
Jorginho Putinatti; Jorge Antônio Putinatti	MF	16	2	8 June 1983	Portugal	15 May 1985	Colombia	
Josimar; Josimar Higino Pereira	DF	16	2	12 June 1986	Northern Ireland	14 November 1989	Yugoslavia	
Valdeir; Valdeir Celso Moreira	FW	16	0	17 October 1990	Chile	5 September 1993	Venezuela	
Palhinha; Jorge Ferreira da Silva	MF	16	5	31 July 1992	Mexico	16 December 1993	Mexico	
Zetti; Armelino Donizete Quagliato	GK	16	0	17 March 1993	Poland	10 September 1997	Ecuador	
Rogério Ceni; Rogério Ceni	GK	16	0	16 December 1997	Mexico	22 June 2006	Japan	
Edu; Eduardo César Daud Gaspar	MF	16	0	28 April 2004	Hungary	22 June 2005	Japan	
Ricardo Oliveira; Ricardo de Oliveira	FW	16	5	8 July 2004	Chile	29 March 2016	Paraguay	
Antony * Antony Matheus dos Santos	MF	16	2	7 October 2021	Venezuela	25 March 2023	Morocco	
Luiz Henrique * Luiz Henrique André Rosa da Silva	MF	16	2	6 September 2024	Ecuador	13 June 2026	Morocco	
Amílcar Barbuy; Amílcar Barbuy	MF	15	5	10 July 1916	Argentina	22 October 1922	Paraguay	
Patesko; Rodolpho Barteczko	FW	15	6	27 May 1934	Spain	5 February 1942	Paraguay	
Jaime de Almeida; Jayme de Almeida	MF	15	1	31 January 1942	Ecuador	10 February 1946	Argentina	
Dino Sani; Dino Sani	MF	15	1	28 March 1957	Uruguay	8 June 1966	Poland	
Coutinho; Antônio Wilson Vieira Honório	FW	15	6	9 July 1960	Uruguay	21 November 1965	Hungary	
Jurandir; Jurandyr de Freitas	DF	15	0	24 April 1962	Paraguay	17 December 1968	Yugoslavia	
Lima; Antônio Lima dos Santos	MF	15	4	2 May 1963	Netherlands	19 July 1966	Portugal	
Neto; José Ferreira Neto	MF	15	5	12 October 1988	Belgium	17 March 1993	Poland	
Giovane Élber; Giovane Élber de Souza	FW	15	7	5 February 1998	Guatemala	5 September 2001	Argentina	
Cicinho; Cícero João de Cézare	DF	15	1	27 April 2005	Guatemala	5 September 2006	Wales	
Arnaldo; Arnaldo Patusca da Silveira	FW	14	0	20 September 1914	Argentina	29 May 1919	Uruguay	
Neco; Manoel Nunes	FW	14	9	3 October 1917	Argentina	29 October 1922	Paraguay	
Nilo; Nilo Murtinho Braga	FW	14	10	11 November 1923	Paraguay	6 September 1931	Uruguay	
Joel; Joel Antônio Martins	MF	14	4	13 March 1957	Chile	29 June 1961	Paraguay	
Mengálvio; Mengálvio Pedro Figueiró	MF	14	1	10 March 1960	Costa Rica	12 May 1963	Italy	
Dirceu Lopes; Dirceu Lopes Mendes	MF	14	3	25 June 1967	Uruguay	6 August 1975	Argentina	
Natal; Natal de Carvalho Baroni	MF	14	3	28 June 1967	Uruguay	6 November 1968	World XI	
Túlio Maravilha; Túlio Humberto Pereira da Costa	FW	14	10	17 October 1990	Chile	20 December 1995	Colombia	
Ronaldão; Ronaldo Rodrigues de Jesus	DF	14	1	18 December 1991	Czechoslovakia	12 August 1995	South Korea	
Amaral; Alexandre da Silva Mariano	MF	14	0	27 September 1995	Romania	31 August 1996	Netherlands	
Luizão; Luiz Carlos Bombonato Goulart	FW	14	4	27 March 1996	Ghana	21 August 2002	Paraguay	
Djalminha; Djalma Feitosa Dias	MF	14	5	16 October 1996	Lithuania	27 March 2002	FR Yugoslavia	
Diego Tardelli; Diego Tardelli Martins	FW	14	3	12 August 2009	Estonia	27 June 2015	Paraguay	
Giuliano de Paula * Giuliano Victor de Paula	MF	14	0	7 October 2010	Iran	10 November 2017	Japan	
Bernard * Bernard Anício Caldeira Duarte	MF	14	1	21 November 2012	Argentina	8 July 2014	Germany	
Lucas Lima * Lucas Rafael Araújo Lima	MF	14	2	5 September 2015	Costa Rica	25 January 2017	Colombia	
Gerson * Gérson Santos da Silva	MF	14	1	2 September 2021	Chile	10 June 2025	Paraguay	
Estêvão Willian * Estêvão William Almeida de Oliveira Gonçalves	MF	14	6	6 September 2024	Ecuador	3 October 2026	India	
Douglas Santos * Douglas dos Santos Justino de Melo	DF	14	0	29 May 2016	Panama	3 October 2026	India	
Fortes; Agostinho Fortes Filho	MF	13	0	18 May 1919	Argentina	13 December 1925	Argentina	
Zezé; José Carlos Baptista Guimarães	FW	13	3	11 September 1920	Chile	9 December 1923	Argentina	
Romeu Pellicciari; Romeu Pellicciari	FW	13	3	5 June 1938	Poland	31 March 1940	Uruguay	
Evaristo; Evaristo de Macedo Filho	FW	13	8	18 September 1955	Chile	21 April 1957	Peru	
Dorval; Dorval Rodrigues	MF	13	1	10 March 1959	Peru	12 May 1963	Italy	
Quarentinha; Waldir Cardoso Lebrego	FW	13	14	17 September 1959	Chile	19 May 1963	Israel	
Dudu; Olegário Toloi de Oliveira	MF	13	1	2 June 1965	Belgium	28 July 1968	Paraguay	
Manga; Haílton Corrêa de Arruda	GK	13	0	6 June 1965	West Germany	19 September 1967	Chile	
Roberto Miranda; Roberto Lopes de Miranda	FW	13	7	19 September 1967	Chile	26 April 1972	Paraguay	
Pedrinho; Pedro Luís Vicençote	DF	13	1	26 July 1979	Bolivia	22 June 1983	Sweden	
Márcio Rossini; Márcio Antônio Rossini	DF	13	1	28 April 1983	Chile	4 November 1983	Uruguay	
Júlio César; Júlio César da Silva	DF	13	0	8 April 1986	East Germany	10 June 1993	Germany	
Elivélton; Elivélton Alves Rufino	MF	13	1	30 October 1991	Yugoslavia	8 August 1993	Mexico	
Marques; Marques Batista de Abreu	FW	13	3	23 December 1994	FR Yugoslavia	7 March 2002	Iceland	
André Luiz; André Luiz Moreira	MF	13	2	22 February 1995	Slovakia	30 April 1997	Mexico	
Zé Elias; José Elías Moedim Júnior	MF	13	0	29 March 1995	Honduras	13 November 1999	Spain	
Beto; Joubert de Araújo Martins	MF	13	0	20 July 1995	United States	4 August 1999	Mexico	
Evanílson; Evanílson Aparecido Ferreira	DF	13	0	5 June 1999	Netherlands	15 August 2000	Chile	
Dante; Dante Bonfim Costa Santos	DF	13	2	6 February 2013	England	8 July 2014	Germany	
Guilherme Arana * Guilherme Antônio Arana Lopes	DF	13	0	7 October 2021	Venezuela	25 March 2025	Argentina	
André * André Trindade da Costa Neto	MF	13	0	20 June 2023	Senegal	10 October 2025	South Korea	
Sávio * Sávio Moreira de Oliveira	MF	13	1	23 March 2024	England	25 March 2025	Argentina	
Cláudio; Cláudio Cristhóvam Pinho	FW	12	5	14 January 1942	Chile	24 March 1957	Colombia	
Friaça; Albino Friaça Cardoso	MF	12	1	4 April 1948	Uruguay	16 April 1952	Uruguay	
Maurinho; Mauro Raphael	MF	12	4	21 March 1954	Paraguay	10 July 1957	Argentina	
Luizinho; Luiz Trochillo	MF	12	1	20 September 1955	Chile	10 July 1957	Argentina	
Marinho Peres; Mário Pérez Ulibarri	DF	12	1	17 July 1968	Peru	6 July 1974	Poland	
Cléber; Cléber Américo da Conceição	DF	12	0	8 November 1990	Chile	8 October 2000	Venezuela	
Paulo Sérgio; Paulo Sérgio Silvestre do Nascimento	MF	12	2	18 December 1991	Czechoslovakia	28 June 1994	Sweden	
Válber; Válber Roel de Oliveira	DF	12	0	31 July 1992	Mexico	25 July 1993	Bolivia	
Doriva; Dorival Ghidoni Júnior	MF	12	0	17 May 1995	Israel	16 June 1998	Morocco	
Jonas; Jonas Gonçalves Oliveira	FW	12	3	27 March 2011	Scotland	8 June 2016	Haiti	
Alex Telles * Alex Nicolao Telles	DF	12	0	23 March 2019	Panama	20 June 2023	Senegal	
Carvalho Leite; Carlos Antônio Dobbert de Carvalho Leite	FW	11	6	20 July 1930	Bolivia	17 March 1940	Argentina	
Luisinho; Luiz Mesquita de Oliveira	FW	11	4	27 May 1934	Spain	18 May 1944	Uruguay	
Argemiro; Argemiro Pinheiro da Silva	MF	11	0	14 June 1938	Czechoslovakia	5 February 1942	Paraguay	
Calvet; Raul Donazar Calvet	DF	11	0	6 March 1960	Mexico	6 May 1962	Portugal	
Rinaldo Amorim; Rinaldo Luís Dias Amorim	MF	11	5	30 May 1964	England	19 September 1967	Chile	
Sadi Schwerdt; Sadi Schwerdt	DF	11	1	17 April 1966	Chile	17 July 1968	Peru	
Rodrigues Neto; José Rodrigues Neto	DF	11	0	9 July 1972	Portugal	24 June 1978	Italy	
Elzo; Elzo Aloísio Coelho	MF	11	0	16 March 1986	Hungary	21 June 1986	France	
Douglas; William Douglas Humia de Menezes	MF	11	0	19 May 1987	England	12 December 1987	West Germany	
Bismarck; Bismarck Barreto Faria	MF	11	1	12 April 1989	Paraguay	17 October 1990	Chile	
Careca Bianchezi; Carlos Alberto Bianchesi	FW	11	1	8 November 1990	Chile	17 July 1991	Argentina	
Mazinho Oliveira; Waldemar Aureliano de Oliveira Filho	FW	11	2	12 December 1990	Mexico	11 September 1991	Wales	
Célio Silva; Vagno Célio do Nascimento Silva	DF	11	0	30 April 1992	Uruguay	16 June 1997	Mexico	
Christian; Christian Correa Dionísio	FW	11	0	10 September 1997	Ecuador	3 March 2001	United States	
Marcos Assunção; Marcos dos Santos Assunção	MF	11	1	8 February 1998	El Salvador	15 August 2000	Chile	
Odvan; Odvan Gomes Silva	DF	11	0	14 October 1998	Ecuador	4 August 1999	Mexico	
Ânderson Polga; Ânderson Corrêa Polga	DF	11	3	31 January 2002	Bolivia	30 April 2003	Mexico	
Heurelho Gomes; Heurelho da Silva Gomes	GK	11	0	13 July 2003	Mexico	7 June 2010	Tanzania	
Dudu Cearense; Alexandro Silva de Souza	MF	11	0	8 July 2004	Chile	27 March 2007	Ghana	
Dedé; Ânderson Vital da Silva	DF	11	1	14 September 2011	Argentina	11 September 2018	El Salvador	
Gil; Carlos Gilberto do Nascimento Silva	DF	11	0	9 September 2014	Ecuador	9 June 2017	Argentina	
Weverton * Weverton Pereira da Silva	GK	11	0	25 January 2017	Colombia	6 June 2026	Egypt	
Danilo * Danilo dos Santos de Oliveira	MF	11	2	26 March 2026	France	3 October 2026	India	
João Gomes * João Victor Gomes da Silva	MF	11	0	23 March 2024	England	14 November 2026	Japan	
Sílvio Lagreca; Sylvio Lagreca	MF	10	1	20 September 1914	Argentina	16 October 1917	Uruguay	
Marcos de Mendonça; Marcos Cláudio Filipe Carneiro de Mendonça	GK	10	0	20 September 1914	Argentina	24 September 1922	Paraguay	
Jaú; Euclydes Barbosa	DF	10	0	27 December 1936	Peru	5 March 1940	Argentina	
Eduardo Lima; Eduardo Jorge de Lima	FW	10	3	14 May 1944	Uruguay	29 March 1947	Uruguay	
Bigode; João Ferreira	DF	10	0	17 April 1949	Colombia	16 July 1950	Uruguay	
Juvenal; Juvenal Amarijo	DF	10	0	7 May 1950	Paraguay	16 July 1950	Uruguay	
Oreco; Valdemar Rodrigues Martins	DF	10	0	1 March 1956	Chile	30 April 1961	Paraguay	
Ílton Vaccari; Ílton Celestino Vaccari	MF	10	1	17 June 1956	Paraguay	31 March 1963	Bolivia	
Procópio Cardoso; Procópio Cardozo Neto	DF	10	0	3 March 1963	Paraguay	11 August 1968	Argentina	
Paulo Henrique; Paulo Henrique Souza de Oliveira	DF	10	0	15 May 1966	Chile	19 September 1967	Chile	
Andrade; Jorge Luiz Andrade da Silva	MF	10	1	28 July 1983	Chile	3 August 1988	Austria	
Edu Manga; Eduardo Antônio dos Santos	MF	10	0	23 May 1987	Republic of Ireland	18 June 1989	Denmark	
Narciso; Narciso dos Santos	MF	10	1	9 August 1995	Japan	18 November 1998	Russia	
Mário Jardel; Mário Jardel Almeida Ribeiro	FW	10	1	28 August 1996	Russia	23 July 2001	Honduras	
Serginho; Sérgio Cláudio dos Santos	DF	10	1	23 September 1998	FR Yugoslavia	7 November 2001	Bolivia	
João Carlos; João Carlos dos Santos	DF	10	1	8 June 1999	Netherlands	4 August 1999	Mexico	
Doni; Donieber Alexander Marangon	GK	10	0	5 June 2007	Turkey	6 June 2008	Venezuela	
Michel Bastos; Michel Fernandes Bastos	MF	10	1	14 November 2009	England	2 July 2010	Netherlands	
Diego Alves; Diego Alves Carreira	GK	10	0	10 November 2011	Gabon	13 June 2017	Australia	
Maxwell; Maxwell Sherrer Cabelino Andrade	DF	10	0	14 August 2013	Switzerland	12 July 2014	Netherlands	
Fagner * Fagner Conserva Lemos	DF	10	0	25 January 2017	Colombia	10 September 2019	Peru	
Andreas Pereira * Andreas Hugo Hoelgebaum Pereira	MF	10	2	11 September 2018	El Salvador	5 June 2025	Ecuador	
Allan * Allan Marques Loureiro	MF	10	0	16 November 2018	Uruguay	13 November 2020	Venezuela	
Emerson Royal * Emerson Aparecido Leite de Souza Junior	DF	10	0	19 November 2019	South Korea	21 November 2023	Argentina	
Vanderson * Vanderson de Oliveira Campos	DF	10	1	17 June 2023	Guinea	14 November 2026	Japan	
Laís; Arthur Antunes de Morais e Castro	MF	9	0	1 June 1919	Argentina	22 October 1922	Paraguay	
Júlio Kuntz; Júlio Kuntz Filho	GK	9	0	11 September 1920	Chile	22 October 1922	Paraguay	
Oberdan Cattani; Oberdan Cattani	GK	9	0	14 May 1944	Uruguay	16 December 1945	Argentina	
Alfredo Ramos; Alfredo Ramos Castilho	DF	9	0	12 March 1953	Ecuador	10 February 1956	Uruguay	
Álvaro; Álvaro José Rodrigues Valente	FW	9	2	20 September 1955	Chile	9 May 1956	England	
Sabará; Onofre Anacleto de Souza	MF	9	1	13 November 1955	Paraguay	12 July 1960	Argentina	
Ademir da Guia; Ademir Ferreira da Guia	MF	9	0	2 June 1965	Belgium	6 July 1974	Poland	
Paraná; Ademir de Barros	MF	9	1	30 June 1965	Sweden	19 July 1966	Portugal	
Denílson; Denílson Custódio Machado	MF	9	1	14 May 1966	Wales	17 July 1968	Peru	
Raul Plassmann; Raul Guilherme Plassmann	GK	9	0	11 August 1968	Argentina	24 June 1980	Chile	
Miguel Ferreira; Miguel Ferreira Pereira	DF	9	0	30 September 1975	Peru	9 June 1976	Paraguay	
Chicão; Francisco Jesuíno Avanzi	MF	9	0	25 February 1976	Uruguay	24 October 1979	Paraguay	
Gilmar Rinaldi; Gilmar Luiz Rinaldi	GK	9	0	8 April 1986	East Germany	12 August 1995	South Korea	
Edu Marangon; Carlos Eduardo Marangon	MF	9	1	19 May 1987	England	12 December 1990	Mexico	
Geraldão; Geraldo Dutra Pereira	DF	9	0	19 May 1987	England	3 July 1987	Chile	
Charles Fabian; Charles Fabian Figueiredo Santos	FW	9	3	10 May 1989	Peru	18 December 1991	Czechoslovakia	
Evair; Evair Aparecido Paulino	FW	9	2	26 February 1992	United States	17 November 1993	Germany	
Carlos Germano; Carlos Germano Schwambach Neto	GK	9	0	11 October 1995	Uruguay	3 June 1998	Andorra	
Donizete Pantera; Osmar Donizete Cândido	MF	9	2	8 November 1995	Argentina	15 February 1998	Jamaica	
Washington; Washington Stecanela Cerqueira	FW	9	2	25 April 2001	Peru	7 March 2002	Iceland	
Gustavo Nery; Gustavo Nery de Sá da Silva	DF	9	0	8 July 2004	Chile	1 March 2006	Russia	
Wesley França * Wesley Vinícius França de Lima	DF	9	0	20 March 2025	Colombia	14 November 2026	Japan	
Andrey Santos * Andrey Nascimento dos Santos	MF	9	0	25 March 2023	Morocco	14 November 2026	Japan	
Heitor; Ettore Marcelino Domingues	FW	8	2	18 May 1919	Argentina	1 August 1930	France	
Nesi; Luiz Ferreira Nesi	MF	8	0	22 October 1922	Argentina	9 December 1923	Argentina	
Pennaforte; Orlando Pennaforte de Araújo	DF	8	0	11 November 1923	Paraguay	25 December 1925	Argentina	
Roberto; Roberto Emílio da Cunha	FW	8	3	27 December 1936	Peru	19 June 1938	Sweden	
Jurandir; Jurandyr Correia dos Santos	GK	8	0	3 January 1937	Chile	14 May 1944	Uruguay	
Alberto Zarzur; Assad Alberto Zarzur	MF	8	0	19 January 1937	Uruguay	31 March 1940	Uruguay	
Ary; Ary Nogueira César	GK	8	0	20 December 1945	Argentina	3 February 1946	Chile	
Ipojucan; Ipojucán Lins de Araújo	MF	8	1	20 April 1952	Chile	17 November 1955	Paraguay	
Veludo; Caetano Silva	GK	8	0	28 February 1954	Chile	24 June 1956	Uruguay	
Paulinho de Almeida; Paulo de Almeida Ribeiro	DF	8	0	18 September 1955	Chile	21 March 1959	Bolivia	
Emanuele Del Vecchio; Emmanuele Del Vecchio	FW	8	1	24 January 1956	Chile	10 July 1957	Argentina	
Juarez Teixeira; Juarez Teixeira	FW	8	3	1 March 1956	Chile	20 March 1960	Argentina	
Gino Orlando; Gino Orlando	FW	8	3	8 April 1956	Portugal	18 May 1958	Bulgaria	
José Altafini; José João Altafini	FW	8	4	16 June 1957	Portugal	19 June 1958	Wales	
Coronel; Antônio Evanil da Silva	DF	8	0	10 March 1959	Peru	20 September 1959	Chile	
Servílio; Servílio de Jesus Filho	FW	8	5	26 May 1960	Argentina	25 June 1966	Scotland	
Ney de Oliveira; Ney de Oliveira	FW	8	0	13 April 1963	Argentina	7 August 1968	Argentina	
César Maluco; César Augusto da Silva Lemos	FW	8	0	9 June 1968	Uruguay	12 May 1974	Paraguay	
Lula; Luís Ribeiro Pinto Neto	MF	8	2	31 July 1971	Argentina	23 January 1977	Bulgaria	
Beto Fuscão; Rigoberto Costa	DF	8	0	19 May 1976	Argentina	20 February 1977	Colombia	
Paulo Vítor; Paulo Victor Barbosa de Carvalho	GK	8	0	17 June 1984	Argentina	17 April 1986	Finland	
Careca; Hamílton de Souza	MF	8	0	7 July 1988	Australia	18 June 1989	Denmark	
Lira; Carlos Augusto de José Lira	DF	8	0	8 November 1990	Chile	17 March 1993	Poland	
Luisinho; Luís Carlos Quintanilha	MF	8	1	23 September 1992	Costa Rica	27 June 1993	Argentina	
Viola; Paulo Sérgio Rosa	FW	8	2	21 June 1993	Chile	29 March 1995	Honduras	
César Belli; César Augusto Belli Michelon	DF	8	0	3 February 1998	Jamaica	30 July 1999	New Zealand	
França; Françoaldo Sena de Souza	FW	8	1	23 May 2000	Wales	17 April 2002	Portugal	
Rafael Sóbis; Rafael Augusto Sóbis do Nascimento	FW	8	0	3 September 2006	Argentina	6 June 2008	Venezuela	
Afonso Alves; Afonso Alves Martins Júnior	FW	8	1	1 June 2007	England	14 October 2007	Colombia	
Anderson; Ânderson Luís de Abreu Oliveira	MF	8	0	27 June 2007	Mexico	19 November 2008	Portugal	
Paulo Henrique Ganso * Paulo Henrique Chagas de Lima	MF	8	0	10 August 2010	United States	28 February 2012	Bosnia and Herzegovina	
Réver; Réver Humberto Alves Araújo	DF	8	1	7 October 2010	Iran	24 April 2013	Chile	
Jádson; Jadson Rodrigues da Silva	MF	8	1	9 February 2011	France	30 June 2013	Spain	
Ralf * Ralf de Souza Teles	MF	8	0	10 August 2011	Germany	24 April 2013	Chile	
Rômulo; Rômulo Borges Monteiro	MF	8	1	28 September 2011	Argentina	10 September 2012	China	
Fernando; Fernando Lucas Martins	MF	8	0	11 October 2012	Iraq	14 August 2013	Switzerland	
Taison * Taison Barcellos Freda	MF	8	1	6 September 2016	Colombia	10 June 2018	Austria	
David Neres * David Neres Campos	MF	8	1	26 March 2019	Czech Republic	17 October 2023	Uruguay	
Gleison Bremer * Gleison Bremer Silva Nascimento	DF	8	1	23 September 2022	Ghana	6 June 2026	Egypt	
Roger Ibañez * Roger Ibañez da Silva	DF	8	0	27 September 2022	Tunisia	13 June 2026	Morocco	
Joelinton * Joelinton Cássio Apolinário de Lira	MF	8	1	17 June 2023	Guinea	14 October 2025	Japan	
João Pedro * João Pedro Junqueira Jesus	FW	8	0	16 November 2023	Colombia	31 March 2026	Croatia	
Rayan * Rayan Vítor Simplício Rocha	MF	8	2	31 March 2026	Croatia	29 September 2026	Australia	
Pedro * Pedro Guilherme Abreu dos Santos	FW	8	2	13 November 2020	Venezuela	3 October 2026	India	
Galo; Armando de Almeida	MF	7	0	8 July 1916	Chile	11 May 1919	Chile	
Palamone; Luiz Bento Palamone	DF	7	0	1 June 1919	Argentina	29 October 1922	Paraguay	
Carreiro; João Baptista Siqueira Lima	FW	7	0	1 February 1937	Argentina	17 March 1940	Argentina	
Zéca Lopes; José dos Santos Lopes	FW	7	0	5 June 1938	Poland	17 March 1940	Argentina	
Servílio de Jesús; Servílio de Jesus	MF	7	1	14 January 1942	Chile	14 February 1945	Argentina	
Newton Canegal; Newton Canegal	DF	7	0	14 February 1945	Argentina	4 April 1948	Uruguay	
Simão; Pedro Simão Aquino de Araújo	FW	7	5	3 April 1949	Ecuador	11 May 1949	Paraguay	
Humberto Tozzi; Humberto Barbosa Tozzi	FW	7	1	28 February 1954	Chile	17 November 1955	Paraguay	
Índio; Aloísio Francisco da Luz	FW	7	2	27 June 1954	Hungary	21 April 1957	Peru	
Dequinha; José Mendonça dos Santos	MF	7	0	18 September 1955	Chile	9 May 1956	England	
Escurinho; Benedito Custódio Ferreira	MF	7	0	18 September 1955	Chile	25 April 1956	Italy	
Walter Marciano; Walter Marciano de Queiroz	MF	7	0	18 September 1955	Chile	1 May 1956	Turkey	
Canário; Darcy Silveira dos Santos	MF	7	2	12 June 1956	Paraguay	8 August 1956	Czechoslovakia	
Delém; Vladen Quevedo Lázaro Ruiz	FW	7	5	1 May 1960	United Arab Republic	12 July 1960	Argentina	
Geraldino; Geraldo Antônio Martins	DF	7	0	3 March 1963	Paraguay	21 November 1965	Hungary	
Marco Antônio; Marco Antônio Garcia Alves	MF	7	2	3 March 1963	Paraguay	31 March 1963	Bolivia	
Oswaldo Taurisano; Oswaldo Taurisano	MF	7	4	3 March 1963	Paraguay	31 March 1963	Bolivia	
Eduardo Albuquerque; Eduardo Barbosa de Albuquerque	DF	7	0	28 April 1963	France	19 May 1963	Israel	
Alcindo; Alcindo Martha de Freitas	FW	7	1	5 June 1966	Poland	25 June 1967	Uruguay	
Fidélis; José Maria Fidélis dos Santos	DF	7	1	5 June 1966	Poland	19 July 1966	Portugal	
Fontana; José de Anchieta Fontana	DF	7	0	8 June 1966	Peru	10 June 1970	Romania	
Eduardo Neves; Eduardo Neves de Castro	MF	7	1	20 June 1968	Poland	28 July 1968	Paraguay	
Vaguinho; Wagno de Freitas	MF	7	1	19 December 1968	Yugoslavia	31 July 1971	Argentina	
Wanderley Paiva; Wanderley Paiva Monteiro	MF	7	0	19 December 1968	Yugoslavia	4 October 1975	Peru	
Vantuir; Vantuir Galdino Ramos	DF	7	0	26 April 1972	Paraguay	4 October 1975	Peru	
José Luiz Carbone; José Luís Carbone	MF	7	0	25 June 1973	Sweden	5 May 1974	Republic of Ireland	
Mirandinha; Sebastião Miranda da Silva Filho	FW	7	0	31 March 1974	Mexico	6 July 1974	Poland	
Pita; Edivaldo de Oliveira Chaves	MF	7	0	27 August 1980	Uruguay	12 December 1987	West Germany	
Mário Sérgio; Mário Sérgio Pontes de Paiva	MF	7	0	28 October 1981	Bulgaria	15 May 1985	Colombia	
João Batista; João Batista Viana dos Santos	DF	7	1	28 May 1987	Finland	15 March 1989	Ecuador	
Aloísio; Aloísio Pires Alves	DF	7	0	7 July 1988	Australia	3 August 1988	Austria	
Cristóvão Borges; Cristóvão Borges dos Santos	MF	7	3	12 April 1989	Paraguay	23 July 1989	Japan	
Paulão; Paulo César Batista dos Santos	DF	7	0	12 September 1990	Spain	16 December 1992	Germany	
Sérgio Guedes; Ivanílton Sérgio Guedes	GK	7	0	17 October 1990	Chile	15 April 1992	Finland	
Leandro Ávila; Leandro Corona D'Ávila	MF	7	0	22 February 1995	Slovakia	2 April 1997	Chile	
Felipe; Felipe Jorge Loureiro	MF	7	0	23 September 1998	FR Yugoslavia	25 July 2004	Argentina	
Euller; Euller Elias de Carvalho	FW	7	3	8 October 2000	Venezuela	5 September 2001	Argentina	
Ewerthon; Ewerthon Henrique de Souza	FW	7	0	25 April 2001	Peru	27 July 2003	Mexico	
Léo; Leonardo Lourenço Bastos	DF	7	0	31 May 2001	Cameroon	22 June 2005	Japan	
Fábio Rochemback; Fábio Rochemback	MF	7	0	31 May 2001	Cameroon	18 July 2001	Paraguay	
Eduardo Costa; Eduardo Nascimento Costa	MF	7	0	15 July 2001	Peru	11 June 2003	Nigeria	
Thiago Neves; Thiago Neves Augusto	MF	7	0	26 March 2008	Sweden	21 November 2012	Argentina	
Diego Souza; Diego de Souza Andrade	MF	7	2	11 October 2009	Bolivia	10 November 2017	Japan	
Bento * Bento Matheus Krepski	GK	7	0	23 March 2024	England	31 March 2026	Croatia	
Píndaro; Píndaro de Carvalho Rodrigues	DF	6	0	20 September 1914	Argentina	29 May 1919	Uruguay	
Millon; Adolpho Millon Júnior	FW	6	1	20 September 1914	Argentina	1 June 1919	Argentina	
Casemiro do Amaral; Casemiro do Amaral	GK	6	0	10 July 1916	Argentina	16 October 1917	Uruguay	
Dino; Antônio Dino Galvão Bueno	MF	6	0	2 October 1921	Argentina	9 December 1923	Argentina	
Alemão; Sylvio Serpa	DF	6	0	11 November 1923	Paraguay	9 December 1923	Argentina	
Amaro; Amaro da Silveira	FW	6	0	11 November 1923	Paraguay	9 December 1923	Argentina	
Mica; Alfredo Pereira de Mello	MF	6	0	11 November 1923	Paraguay	9 December 1923	Argentina	
Nélson da Conceição; Nélson da Conceição	GK	6	0	11 November 1923	Paraguay	9 December 1923	Argentina	
Paschoal Silva; Paschoal Silva Cinelli	FW	6	0	11 November 1923	Paraguay	9 December 1923	Argentina	
Martim Silveira; Martim Mércio da Silveira	MF	6	0	4 December 1932	Uruguay	16 June 1938	Italy	
Hércules; Hércules de Miranda	FW	6	3	5 June 1938	Poland	31 March 1940	Uruguay	
Arthur Machado; Arthur Machado	DF	6	0	5 June 1938	Poland	31 March 1940	Uruguay	
José Perácio; José Perácio Berjum	FW	6	4	5 June 1938	Poland	31 March 1940	Uruguay	
Florindo; Florindo Alves Ferreira	MF	6	0	22 January 1939	Argentina	24 March 1940	Uruguay	
Pedro Amorim; Pedro Amorim Duarte	FW	6	3	24 March 1940	Uruguay	5 February 1942	Paraguay	
Cajú; Alfredo Gottardi	GK	6	0	14 January 1942	Chile	5 February 1942	Paraguay	
Begliomini; Pelegrino Adelmo Begliomini	DF	6	0	31 January 1942	Ecuador	14 February 1945	Argentina	
Biguá; Moacyr Cordeiro	DF	6	0	21 January 1945	Colombia	28 February 1945	Chile	
Maneca; Manuel Marinho Alves	FW	6	2	7 May 1950	Paraguay	9 July 1950	Sweden	
Larry; Larry Pinto de Faria	MF	6	4	1 March 1956	Chile	25 April 1956	Italy	
Ênio Rodrigues; Ênio Antônio Rodrigues da Silva	MF	6	0	1 March 1956	Chile	10 March 1960	Costa Rica	
Paulinho; Paulo de Almeida	MF	6	1	11 April 1956	Switzerland	9 May 1956	England	
Leônidas da Selva; Manoel Pereira	FW	6	1	12 June 1956	Paraguay	5 August 1956	Czechoslovakia	
Jadir; Jadyr Egídio de Souza	MF	6	0	11 June 1957	Portugal	29 June 1961	Paraguay	
Moacir; Moacyr Claudino Pinto	MF	6	2	11 June 1957	Portugal	12 July 1960	Argentina	
Dida; Edvaldo Alves de Santa Rosa	FW	6	4	4 May 1958	Paraguay	29 June 1961	Paraguay	
Almir Pernambuquinho; Almir Moraes de Albuquerque	FW	6	0	10 March 1959	Peru	3 July 1960	Paraguay	
Airton Pavilhão; Aírton Ferreira da Silva	DF	6	0	6 March 1960	Mexico	20 March 1960	Argentina	
Marino; Marino da Silva	MF	6	0	6 March 1960	Mexico	20 March 1960	Argentina	
Milton Kuelle; Mílton Martins Kuelle	MF	6	1	6 March 1960	Mexico	20 March 1960	Argentina	
Élton Fensterseifer; Élton Fensterseifer	MF	6	3	6 March 1960	Mexico	20 March 1960	Argentina	
Almir; Almir da Silva	FW	6	1	3 March 1963	Paraguay	31 March 1963	Bolivia	
Jorge de Souza; Jorge de Souza	DF	6	0	3 March 1963	Paraguay	31 March 1963	Bolivia	
Marcial; Marcial de Mello Castro	GK	6	0	3 March 1963	Paraguay	19 May 1963	Israel	
William; William José de Assis Silva	DF	6	0	3 March 1963	Paraguay	27 March 1963	Ecuador	
Marcos; Marcos Pereira Martins	MF	6	0	21 April 1963	Portugal	21 November 1965	Hungary	
Silva Batuta; Walter Machado da Silva	FW	6	2	14 May 1966	Wales	19 July 1966	Portugal	
Cláudio; Cláudio Cezar de Aguiar Mauriz	GK	6	0	9 June 1968	Uruguay	17 July 1968	Peru	
Dadá Maravilha; Dario José dos Santos	FW	6	0	12 April 1970	Paraguay	25 June 1973	Sweden	
Marcelo Oliveira; Marcello de Oliveira Santos	MF	6	1	30 July 1975	Venezuela	14 July 1977	Bolivia	
Roberto Batata; Roberto Monteiro	FW	6	3	30 July 1975	Venezuela	4 October 1975	Peru	
Romeu Evangelista; Romeu Evangelista	MF	6	1	30 July 1975	Venezuela	4 October 1975	Peru	
Orlando Lelé; Orlando Pereira	DF	6	0	28 April 1976	Uruguay	30 June 1977	France	
Givanildo Oliveira; Givanildo José de Oliveira	MF	6	0	31 May 1976	Italy	20 February 1977	Colombia	
Nunes; João Batista Nunes de Oliveira	FW	6	2	1 April 1978	France	24 June 1980	Chile	
Jorge Mendonça; Jorge Pinto Mendonça	FW	6	0	7 June 1978	Spain	24 June 1978	Italy	
Baltazar; Baltazar Maria de Moraes Júnior	FW	6	2	27 August 1980	Uruguay	7 July 1989	Colombia	
Paulo Roberto; Paulo Roberto Curtis Costa	DF	6	0	24 August 1983	Argentina	21 June 1989	Switzerland	
Milton; Mílton Luiz de Souza Filho	MF	6	0	9 December 1987	Chile	3 August 1988	Austria	
Edmar; Edmar Bernardes dos Santos	FW	6	3	10 July 1988	Argentina	3 August 1988	Austria	
Acácio; Acácio Cordeiro Barreto	GK	6	0	15 March 1989	Ecuador	18 June 1989	Denmark	
Donizete Oliveira; Donizete Francisco de Oliveira	MF	6	0	12 September 1990	Spain	8 October 2000	Venezuela	
Gil Baiano; José Gildásio Pereira de Mattos	DF	6	0	12 September 1990	Spain	27 March 1991	Argentina	
Moacir; Moacir Rodrigues dos Santos	MF	6	1	12 September 1990	Spain	11 September 1991	Wales	
Almir; Almir de Souza Fraga	FW	6	0	12 December 1990	Mexico	27 June 1993	Argentina	
Wilson Gottardo; Wilson Roberto Gottardo	DF	6	0	27 March 1991	Argentina	13 July 1991	Colombia	
Arílson; Arílson Gilberto da Costa	MF	6	0	8 November 1995	Argentina	21 January 1996	Mexico	
Paulo Jamelli; Paulo Roberto Jamelli Júnior	MF	6	2	12 January 1996	Canada	24 April 1996	South Africa	
Sonny Anderson; Ânderson da Silva	FW	6	1	10 August 1997	South Korea	2 June 2001	Canada	
Sylvinho; Sylvio Mendes Campos Júnior	DF	6	0	23 May 2000	Wales	28 March 2001	Ecuador	
Guilherme Alves; Guilherme de Cássio Alves	FW	6	1	28 June 2000	Uruguay	23 July 2001	Honduras	
Mancini; Alessandro Faiolhe Amantino	MF	6	0	28 April 2004	Hungary	19 November 2008	Portugal	
Henrique; Henrique Adriano Buss	DF	6	0	6 June 2008	Venezuela	4 July 2014	Colombia	
Carlos Eduardo; Carlos Eduardo Marques Carlini	MF	6	0	14 November 2009	England	11 October 2010	Ukraine	
Victor; Victor Leandro Bagy	GK	6	0	10 August 2010	United States	16 November 2013	Honduras	
Jean * Jean Raphael Vanderlei Moreira	MF	6	0	21 November 2012	Argentina	14 August 2013	Switzerland	
Raphael Veiga * Raphael Cavalcante Veiga	MF	6	0	25 March 2023	Morocco	21 November 2023	Argentina	
Fabrício Bruno * Fabrício Bruno Soares de Faria	DF	6	0	23 March 2024	England	18 November 2025	Tunisia	
Wendell * Wendell Nascimento Borges	DF	6	0	23 March 2024	England	6 September 2024	Ecuador	

== See also ==
- List of Brazil international footballers
- List of Brazil international footballers (2–5 caps)
- List of Brazil international footballers (1 cap)
