= 1937 South American Championship play-off =

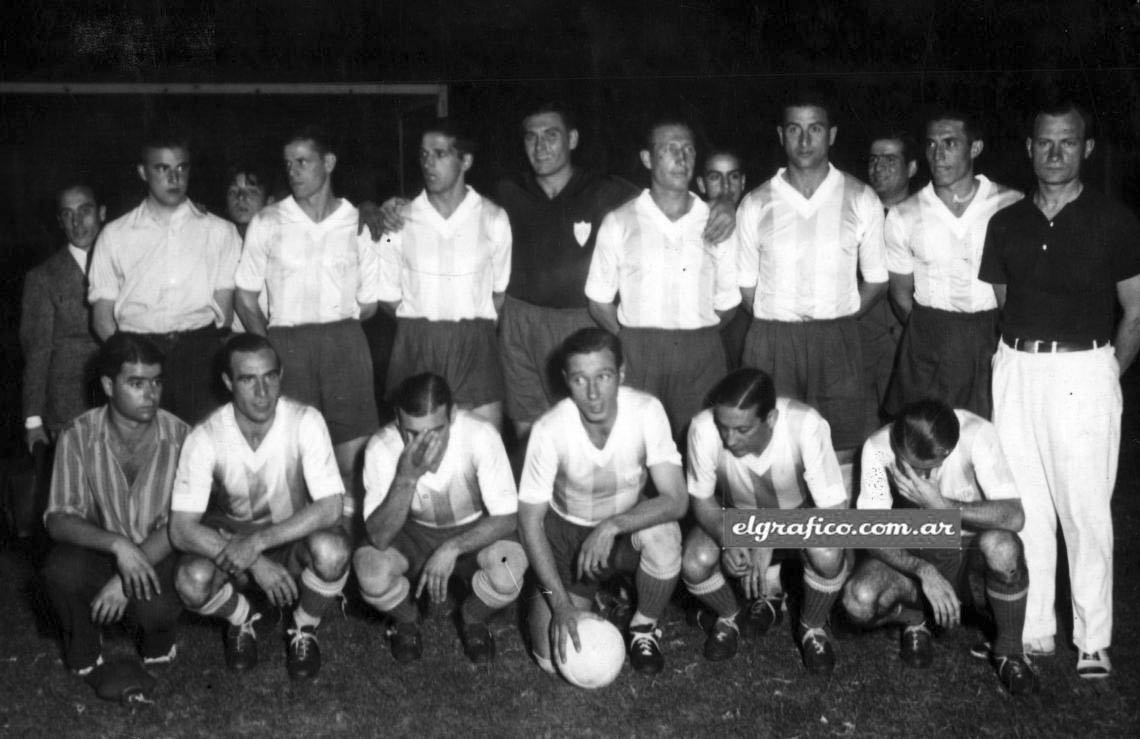
- Argentina, champions
- Event: 1937 South American Championship
Argentina	Brazil
2	0
- Date: February 1, 1937
- Venue: Estadio Gasómetro, Buenos Aires
- Referee: Luis Alberto Mirabal (Uruguay)
- Attendance: 80,000

The 1937 South American Championship play-off was a match held to determine the winner of the 1937 South American Championship, the 14th edition of this continental championship, as Argentina and Brazil were tied for the first place after the regular competition. The match took place on February 1, 1937, at Estadio Gasómetro in Buenos Aires.

Argentina won the match 2–0, winning its fifth continental title.

== Venue ==
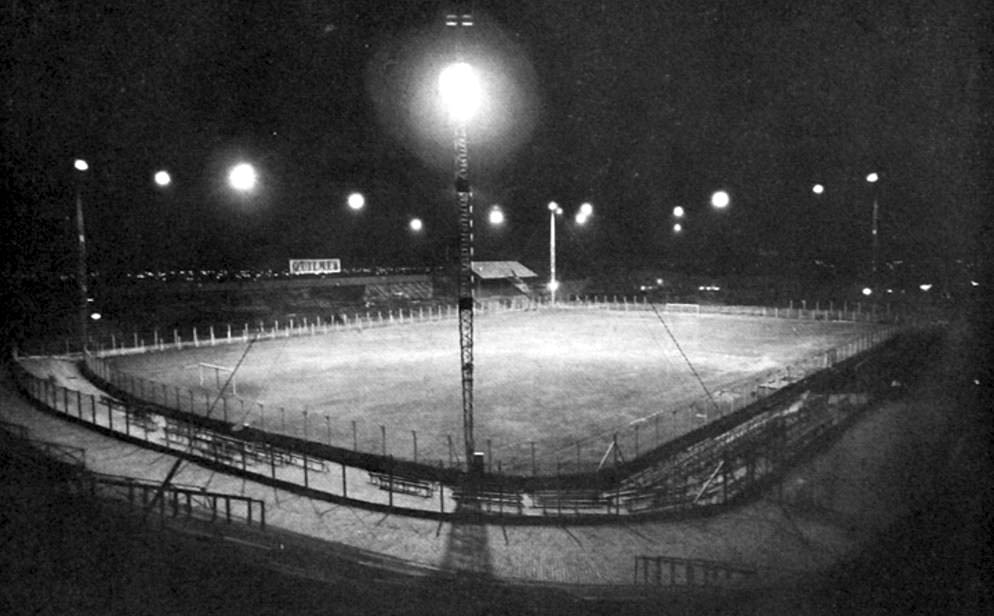
Estadio Gasómetro, venue

The final was held in Estadio Gasómetro, home venue to San Lorenzo de Almagro. The stadium had hosted most of the competition matches, being also one of the venues of the 1929 edition.

The stadium was nicknamed Gasómetro due to its exterior facade that reminded of a gas holder, very common at the time. It has a capacity of 75,000 spectators, being the largest stadium of Argentina until the construction of El Cilindro, home venue of Racing Club de Avellaneda, inaugurated in 1950.

== Background ==
Argentina
Round
Brazil
Opponent
Result
Group stage
Opponent
Result
Chile
2–1
Match 1
Peru
3–2

Paraguay
6–1
Match 2
Chile
6–4

Peru
1–0
Match 3
Paraguay
5–0

Uruguay
2–3
Match 4
Uruguay
3–2

Brazil
1–0
Match 5
Argentina
0–1

Team	Pld	W	D	L	GF	GA	GD	Pts
Argentina	5	4	0	1	12	5	+7	8
Brazil	5	4	0	1	17	9	+8	8
Uruguay	5	2	0	3	11	14	−3	4
Paraguay	5	2	0	3	8	16	−8	4
Chile	5	1	1	3	12	13	−1	3
Peru	5	1	1	3	7	10	−3	3

Notes

- Argentina and Brazil finished tied on points, so a play-off had to be played to decide the champion.

== Overview ==
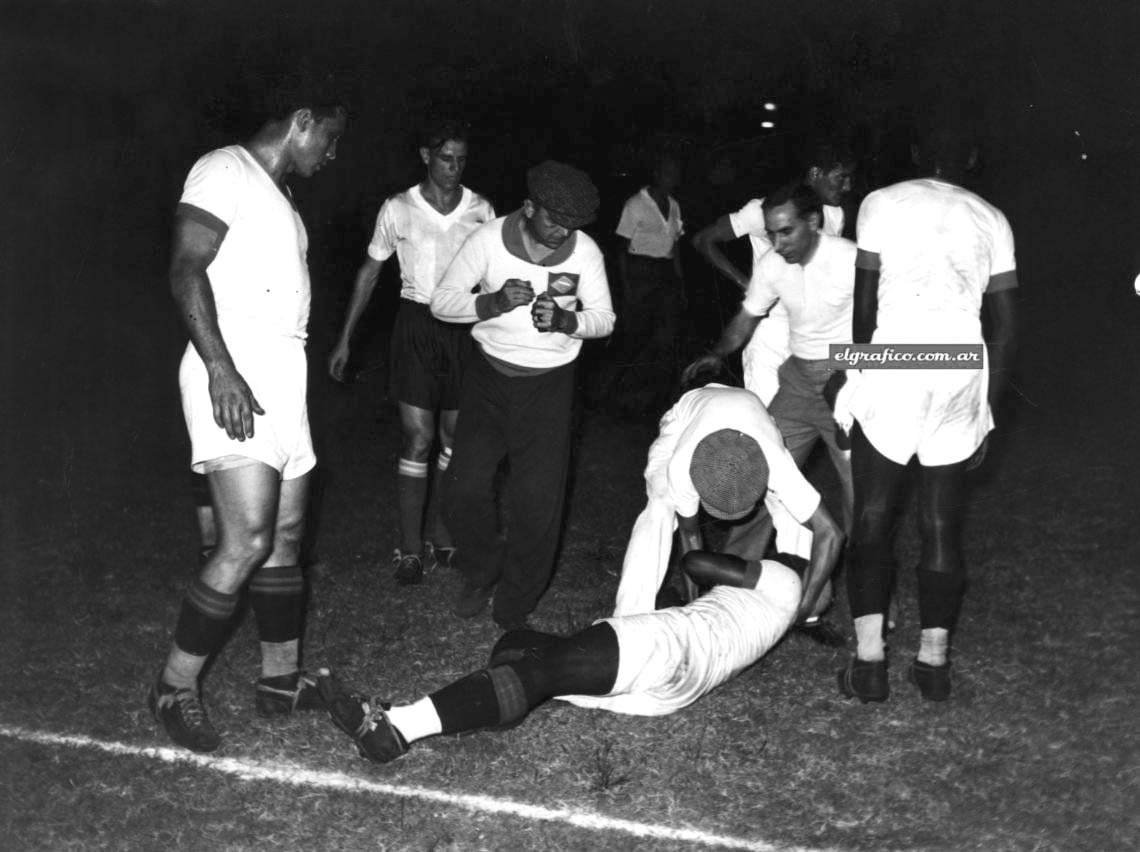
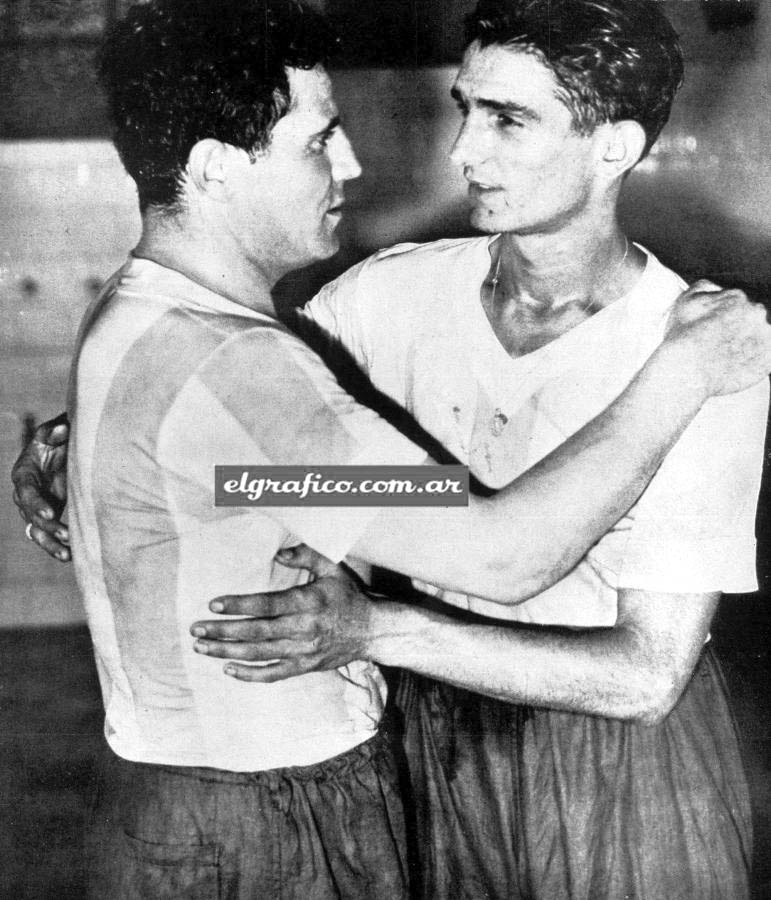
(Left): the match while being suspended after a riot between players from both teams; (right): veteran Bernabé Ferreyra and a young Vicente de la Mata celebrating the title

Brazil had attended the competition without two of their most notable players, defender Domingos da Guia (champion with Boca Juniors two years before) and striker Leonidas da Silva, nicknamed the Black Diamond. The tournament was played in a single round-robin system, but Argentina and Brazil finished tied on points, meaning a playoff match was required to determine a champion, according to the rules in force.

The match was held in San Lorenzo stadium, were both teams played hard, committing several number of fouls. After Brazilian player Domingos Spitalletti kicked Francisco Varallo violently in the 36th minute, a riot involving all the players (even some substitutes) started. After a hiatus of 40', the match restarted. Nevertheless, just two minutes a new riot happened after Cunha hit Cherro on his face.

For the second half Carlos Peucelle replaced Cherro and veteran Bernabé Ferreyra substituted Zozaya. 19-year-old Independiente forward Vicente de la Mata replaced Varallo, who had been injured; De la Mata had played in the loss to Uruguay, and had a poor performance.

As the score was tied 0–0 when 90 minutes expired, two 15-minute halves of extra time were required to determine the champion: during the extra time, de la Mata scored two goals within four minutes, allowing Argentina to win its fifth South American championship.

The match ended at almost 2 a.m. in Buenos Aires. According to the press, Argentine forward Enrique García was the man of the match.

== Match details ==
February 1, 1937

Argentina	2–0 (a.e.t.)	Brazil
De la Mata 102', 112'	Report

Estadio Gasómetro, Buenos Aires
Attendance: 80,000
Referee: Luis Alberto Mirabal (Uruguay)

Argentina	Brazil

GK	Fernando Bello
RB	Oscar Tarrío
LB	Luis Fazio
RH	Antonio Sastre
CH	Ernesto Lazzatti
LH	Celestino Martínez
OR	Enrique Guaita
IR	Francisco Varallo	(substituted off) 84'
CF	Alberto Zozaya	(substituted off) 65'
IL	Roberto Cherro	(substituted off) 46'
OL	Enrique García
Substitutions:
OR	Carlos Peucelle	(substituted on) 46'
CF	Bernabé Ferreyra	(substituted on) 65'
IR	Vicente de la Mata	(substituted on) 84'
Manager:
Manuel Seoane

GK	Jurandir
RB	Carnera
LB	Jaú
RH	Britto
CH	Brandão
LH	Afonsinho
OR	Roberto	(substituted off) 58'
IR	Luisinho	(substituted off) 61'
CF	Cardeal	(substituted off) 84'
IL	Tim
OL	Patesko
Substitutions:
FW	Carreiro	(substituted on) 58'
FW	Bahia	(substituted on) 61'
FW	Carvalho Leite	(substituted on) 84'
Manager:
Adhemar Pimenta

== Aftermath ==
Some journalist consider this match the beginning of the Argentina–Brazil football rivalry. This tournament was also the closure of an era with the Argentine squad for some of the most notable players such as Enrique Guaita, Alberto Zozaya, Alejandro Scopelli, Bernabé Ferreyra, Carlos Peucelle and Francisco Varallo.

When I was substituted vs Uruguay, I became demoralised. Still sweated, I stayed to watch the second half. Then I got ill, probably with bitterness. I scored the two goals but I wanted to play more time. I didn't.

— Vicente de la Mata, during an interview with El Gráfico
