= Fazio (name) =

Fazio is a surname and a masculine given name. Notable people with the name include:

== People ==
=== Surname ===
- Amanda Fazio (born 1954), Australian politician
- Antonio Fazio (born 1936), Italian banker
- Buzz Fazio (1908–1993), American bowling star
- Ernie Fazio (1942–2017), American baseball player
- Federico Fazio (born 1987), Argentine footballer
- Ferruccio Fazio (born 1944), Italian physician and politician
- Foge Fazio (1938–2009), American football player and coach
- George Fazio (1912–1986), American golfer and golf course architect
- Giovanni Fazio (1933 or 1934 – 2026), American astrophysicist
- Justin Fazio (born 1997), Italian ice hockey player
- Luis Fazio (1911–date of death unknown), Argentine footballer
- Mario Fazio (1919–1983), Italian racing cyclist
- Russell H. Fazio (born 1952), American social psychologist
- Ryan Fazio (born 1990), American politician
- Silvio Fazio (born 1952), Italian writer
- Tom Fazio (born 1945), golf course architect
- Victor H. Fazio (1942–2022), American politician

=== Given name ===
- Fazio Cardano (1444–1524), Italian jurist and mathematician
- Fazio Fabbrini (1926–2018), Italian politician and Mayor of Siena
- Fazio Giovanni Santori (1447–1510), Italian cardinal

== Fictional characters ==
- Benny Fazio, on the TV series The Sopranos

== See also ==
- Fazio (disambiguation)
- DeFazio, list of people with a similar surname
