= Nicomedes =

Nicomedes is a Greek given name Ancient Greek: Νικομήδης). Notable people with the name include:

- Nicomedes (mathematician), ancient Greek mathematician who discovered the conchoid named after him
- Nicomedes of Sparta, regent during the youth of King Pleistoanax, commanded the Spartan army at the Battle of Tanagra (457 BC)
- Saint Nicomedes, Martyr of unknown era, whose feast is observed 15 September

== Kings of Bithynia ==
- Nicomedes I of Bithynia, ruled 278–255 BC
- Nicomedes II of Bithynia, 149–127 BC
- Nicomedes III of Bithynia, 127–94 BC
- Nicomedes IV of Bithynia, 94–74 BC

== Other ==
- José Nicomedes Grossi, Brazilian bishop
- Nicomedes da Conceição or Torteroli, Brazilian footballer
- Nicomedes Guzmán, Chilean writer, editor, poet, and novelist
- Nicomedes "Nick" Marquez Joaquin or Nick Joaquin, Filipino writer and journalist
- Nicomedes Santa Cruz, Peruvian singer

== See also ==
- Nicomède, French play about Nicomedes II
- Nycomed, Swiss pharmaceutical company
