= DeFazio =

DeFazio may refer to:

- Brandon DeFazio (born 1988), Canadian ice hockeyer
- Candy DeFazio (born 1950), United States lawn bowler
- David DeFazio (born 1983), American-born ice dancer
- Dean DeFazio (born 1963), Canadian ice hockey forward
- Johnny DeFazio (1940–2021), American professional wrestler
- Peter DeFazio (born 1947), representative from Oregon's 4th congressional district

== See also ==
- Fazio (surname), list of people with a similar surname
