= Fazio =

Fazio may refer to:

== People ==
- Fazio (name), list of people and fictional characters with the given name or surname

== Other uses ==
- Fazio (play), an 1818 play by Henry Hart Milman
- Fazio's, former American supermarket chain
- Fazio–Londe disease (FLD), motor neuron disease of children and young adults
- Mount Fazio, Tobin Mesa, Victoria Land, Antarctica
- Vic Fazio Yolo Wildlife Area, wetland restoration area in Yolo County, California

== See also ==
- 22633 Fazio, a minor planet
