= Mario Baeza (footballer) =

Chilean footballer (1916–1993)

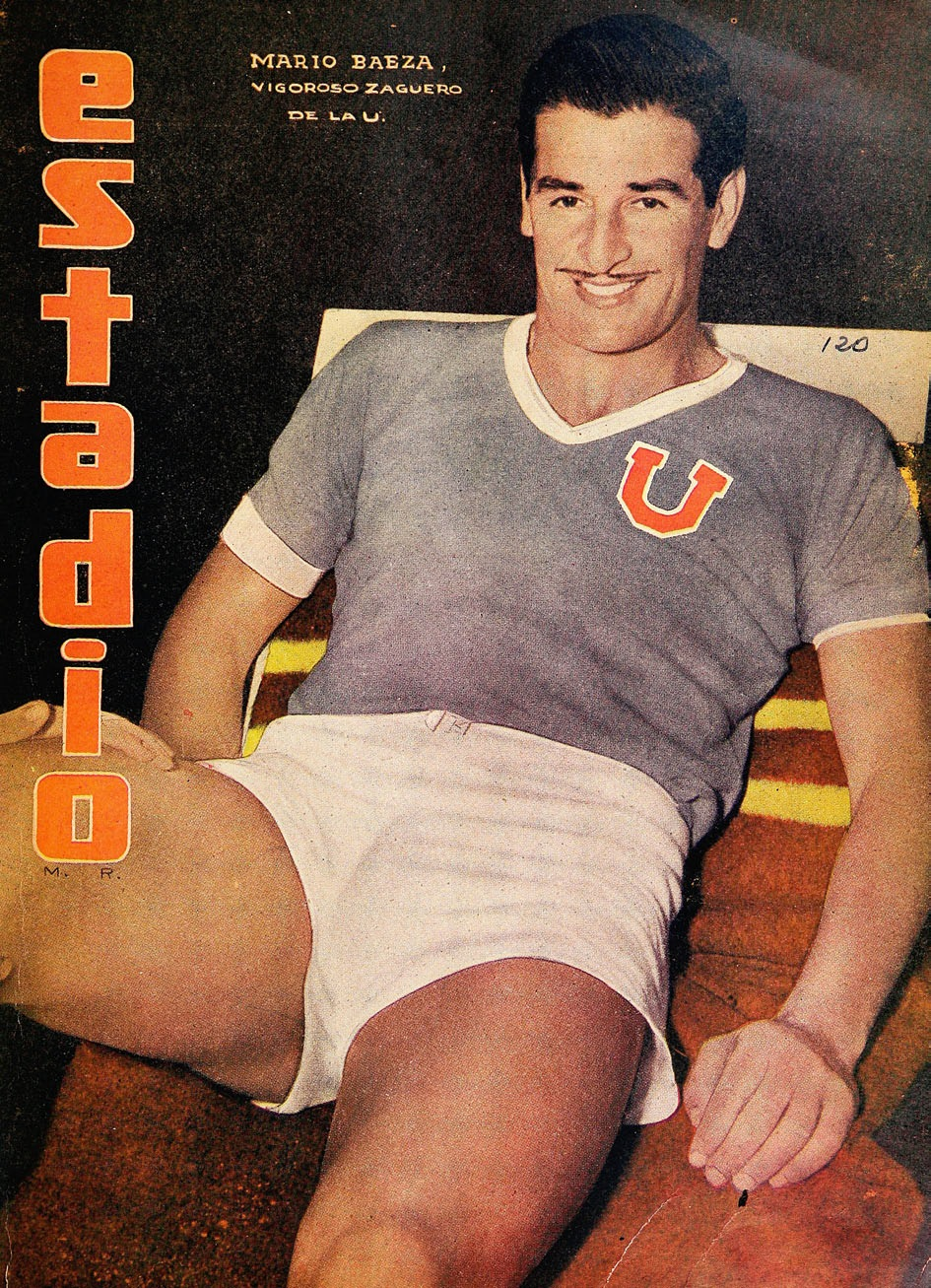

Personal information
- Full name: Mario Godofredo Baeza Azócar
- Date of birth: 28 April 1916
- Date of death: 9 May 1993 (aged 77)
- Position: Defender

International career
Years	Team	Apps	(Gls)
1937–1947	Chile	4	(0)

Mario Baeza (28 April 1916 – 9 May 1993) was a Chilean footballer. He played in four matches for the Chile national football team from 1937 to 1947. He was also part of Chile's squad for the 1937 South American Championship.
