= Avelino Cadilla =

Uruguayan footballer (1918-1974)

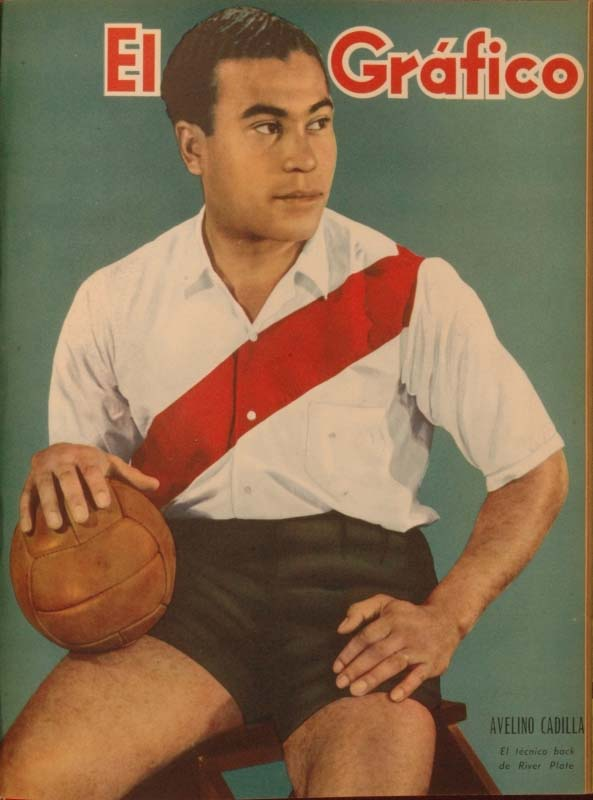
- Avelino Cadilla

Personal information
- Date of birth: 1917 August 5
- Date of death: 1974 (aged 55–56)
- Position: Defender

International career
Years	Team	Apps	(Gls)
1937–1941	Uruguay	2	(0)

Avelino Cadilla (1918–1974) was a Uruguayan footballer. He played in two matches for the Uruguay national football team in 1937 and 1941. He was also part of Uruguay's squad for the 1937 South American Championship.
