= Bartolomé Colombo =

Argentine footballer

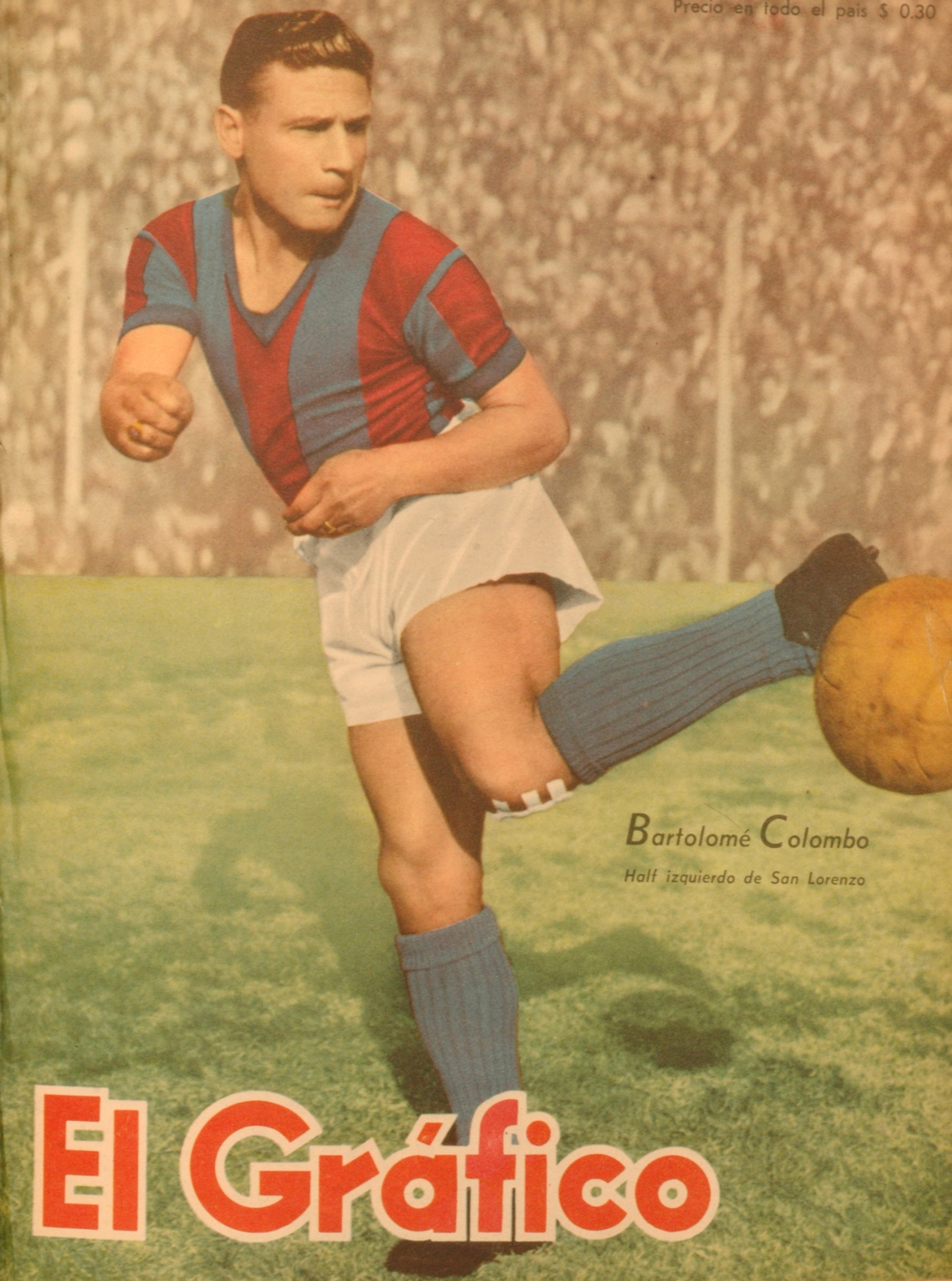

Personal information
- Date of birth: 24 August 1916
- Position: Defender

International career
Years	Team	Apps	(Gls)
1937–1945	Argentina	17	(0)

Bartolomé Colombo (24 August 1916 – date of death unknown) was an Argentine footballer. He played in 17 matches for the Argentina national football team from 1937 to 1945. He was also part of Argentina's squad for the 1945 South American Championship.

== Honours ==
San Lorenzo

- Argentine Primera División: 1946

Argentina

- Copa América: 1937, 1941, 1945
