= Nariz (footballer) =

Brazilian footballer

Personal information
- Full name: Álvaro Lopes Cançado
- Date of birth: 8 February 1912
- Place of birth: Brazil
- Date of death: 19 September 1984 (aged 72)
- Position: Defender

Senior career*
Years	Team	Apps	(Gls)
- Botafogo

International career
- Brazil
Medal record
Representing Brazil
FIFA World Cup
Third place	1938 France
- * Club domestic league appearances and goals

Álvaro Lopes Cançado, nicknamed "Nariz" (meaning "Nose") (Uberaba, February 8, 1912 – September 19, 1984), was a Brazilian footballer who played as a defender for the Brazil national football team in the 1938 FIFA World Cup. He participated in only one match in that tournament, against Czechoslovakia. At the time, his club was Botafogo.

In his final years in football, he played for Fluminense and Botafogo while studying medicine in Rio de Janeiro, retiring from the sport in 1941. After his departure from football, he focused on a career in orthopedics and contributed to the establishment of the first School of Medicine in his hometown, Uberaba, in 1954, where he later served as a faculty member.

Nariz committed suicide on September 19, 1984, at the age of 72.
