= Soda (footballer) =

Brazilian footballer

Personal information
- Full name: Cleobulo Faría
- Date of birth: 2 March 1901
- Place of birth: Conceição de Macabu, Rio de Janeiro
- Position: Wing half

Senior career*
Years	Team	Apps	(Gls)
- Americano

International career
1923	Brazil	3	(0)
- * Club domestic league appearances and goals

Cleobulo Faría (born 2 March 1901, date of death unknown), known as Soda, was a Brazilian footballer. He played in three matches for the Brazil national football team in 1923. He was also part of Brazil's squad for the 1923 South American Championship.
