= Galileo Chanes =

Uruguayan footballer (1917-1961)

Personal information
- Full name: Galileo Chanes
- Date of birth: 28 March 1917
- Place of birth: Uruguay
- Date of death: 3 April 1961 (aged 42)
- Place of death: Unknown
- Position: Midfielder

Senior career*
Years	Team	Apps	(Gls)
1932–1937	Peñarol		
1937–1941	River Plate Montevideo		
1938	Huracán	11	(0)
1941–1947	Peñarol		

International career
1934–1937	Uruguay	5	(0)
- * Club domestic league appearances and goals

Galileo Chanes (28 March 1917 – 3 April 1961) was a Uruguayan footballer who played for Peñarol and Club Atlético Huracán, as well as the Uruguay national football team. He represented Uruguay at the 1937 South American Championship.
