= Eugenio Galvalisi =

Uruguayan footballer (1915-2000)

Personal information
- Date of birth: 15 November 1915
- Date of death: 9 December 2000 (aged 85)
- Position: Midfielder

International career
Years	Team	Apps	(Gls)
1935–1937	Uruguay	4	(0)

Eugenio Galvalisi (15 November 1915 – 9 December 2000) was a Uruguayan footballer. He played in four matches for the Uruguay national football team from 1935 to 1937. He was also part of Uruguay's squad for the 1937 South American Championship.
