= Coelho (footballer) =

Brazilian footballer (1902–??)

Personal information
- Full name: José Manuel Ferreira Coelho
- Date of birth: 4 April 1902
- Date of death: 1979
- Position: Forward

International career
Years	Team	Apps	(Gls)
1923	Brazil	3	(0)

José Manuel Ferreira Coelho (born 4 May 1902, date of death unknown), known as just Coelho, was a Brazilian footballer. He played in three matches for the Brazil national football team in 1923. He was also part of Brazil's squad for the 1923 South American Championship.

He was a soldier too, who reached the rank of General in the Brazilian Army and General Commander in the Military Police of the State of Pará. He started his career when he join into the Escola Militar de Barbacena (MG). He participated in important moments in the military history of Brazil: as a loyalist during the Revolta do Forte de Copacabana, as a lieutenant during the 1930 Revolution, as a supply major for the Brazilian Expeditionary Force (FEB) from 1941 to 1944 and during the civil-military coup. 1964, he was appointed Secretary of Public Security for the State of Pará. He was important in the reorganization of the Military Police of the State of Pará during the 1930s and is therefore considered a patron of the same. There is also a medal dedicated in his memory, the General Ferreira Coelho Medal - Dedication to Study, created in 1981, destined for those who placed first in briosa's courses.
