= Jorge Córdova (footballer) =

Chilean footballer (1913-1989)

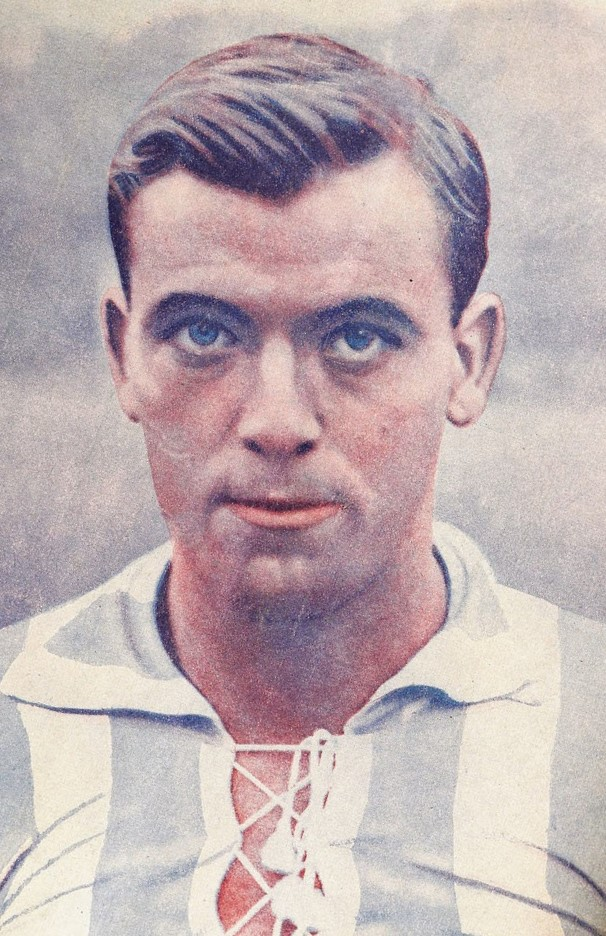
- Córdova in 1935

Personal information
- Full name: Jorge Córdova Olivares
- Date of birth: 5 April 1913
- Date of death: 7 June 1989 (aged 76)
- Position: Defender

International career
Years	Team	Apps	(Gls)
1937–1939	Chile	11	(0)

Jorge Córdova Olivares (5 April 1913 – 7 June 1989) was a Chilean footballer. He played in eleven matches for the Chile national football team from 1937 to 1939. He was also part of Chile's squad for the 1937 South American Championship.
