= Juan Besuzzo =

Uruguayan footballer (1913–1980)

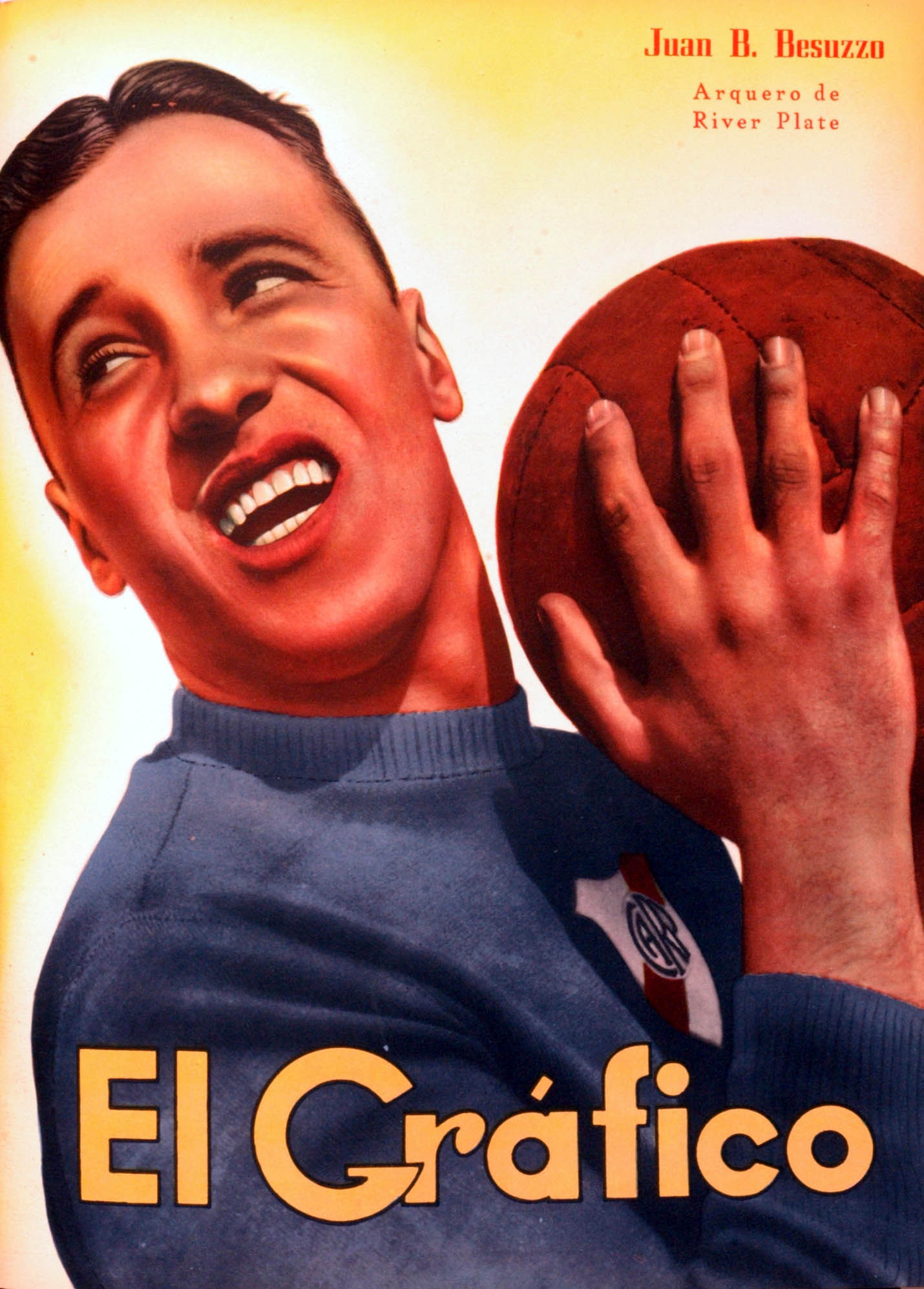

Personal information
- Full name: Juan Bautista Besuzzo
- Date of birth: 18 January 1913
- Place of birth: Montevideo, Uruguay
- Date of death: 1980 (aged 66–67)
- Position: Goalkeeper

International career
Years	Team	Apps	(Gls)
1936–1938	Uruguay	6	(0)

Juan Bautista Besuzzo (18 January 1913 – 1980) was a Uruguayan footballer. He played in six matches for the Uruguay national football team from 1936 to 1938. He was also part of Uruguay's squad for the 1937 South American Championship.
