= Luis Ponce =

Chilean footballer (1910-1974)

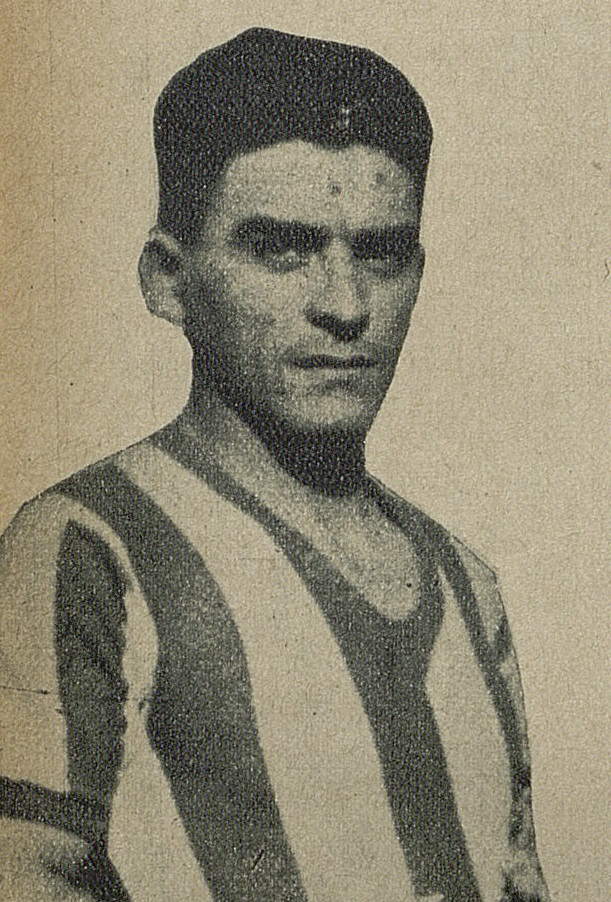
- Ponce with Magallanes in 1938

Personal information
- Full name: Luis Arturo Ponce Ortiz
- Date of birth: 6 June 1910
- Place of birth: Santiago, Chile
- Date of death: 10 November 1974 (aged 64)
- Place of death: Santiago, Chile
- Position: Midfielder

Senior career*
Years	Team	Apps	(Gls)
–1933	Liverpool Wanderers		
1933–1942	Magallanes		
1943–1944	Unión Española		
1945	Iberia		

International career
1937–1939	Chile	8	(0)

Managerial career
- 1945: Iberia
- * Club domestic league appearances and goals

Luis Arturo Ponce Ortiz (6 June 1910 – 10 November 1974) was a Chilean footballer. He played in eight matches for the Chile national football team from 1937 to 1939. He was also part of Chile's squad for the 1937 South American Championship.

== Career ==
Ponce joined Magallanes in 1933 from Liverpool Wanderers, winning the Chilean Primera División in 1933, 1934, 1935 and 1938. Despite spending over two years with no playing due to an act of indiscipline, he joined Unión Española in 1943, winning the league title.

Ponce ended his career as player/manager of Iberia, then based in Santiago, winning the División de Ascenso de Chile in 1945.
