= Britto (footballer) =

Brazilian footballer (1914–?)

Personal information
- Full name: Hermínio Américo de Brito
- Date of birth: May 6, 1914
- Place of birth: São Paulo, Brazil
- Place of death: São Paulo, Brazil
- Position: Midfielder

Senior career*
Years	Team	Apps	(Gls)
1933–1936	Corinthians		
1937–1938	América		
1938–1939	Flamengo		
1939	Independiente		
1939	Peñarol		
1940–1941	Vasco da Gama		
1945	Internacional		
1945–1947	Bangu		

International career
1937–1938	Brazil		

Managerial career
- 1945: Internacional
Medal record
Representing Brazil
FIFA World Cup
Third place	1938 France
- * Club domestic league appearances and goals

Hermínio Américo de Brito (May 6, 1914 – unknown), nicknamed Britto, was a Brazilian footballer who played as a midfielder. He was born in São Paulo. He played for Corinthians, América, Flamengo, Vasco da Gama, Internacional and Bangu at club level. For the Brazil national team, he played two matches at the 1938 FIFA World Cup. De Brito is deceased.
