= Juan Carlos Iribarren =

Argentine footballer (1901–1969)

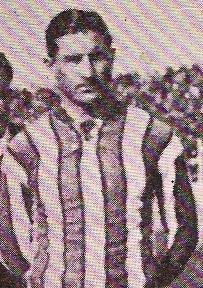

Personal information
- Full name: Juan Carlos Iribarren
- Date of birth: 27 March 1901
- Date of death: 18 March 1969 (aged 68)

International career
Years	Team	Apps	(Gls)
1922–1937	Argentina	16	(0)

Juan Carlos Iribarren (27 March 1901 – 18 March 1969) was an Argentine footballer who played as a defender. He played in 16 matches for the Argentina national football team from 1922 to 1937. He was also part of Argentina's squad for the 1923 South American Championship. he died on 18 March 1969 in age 68
