= Cardeal (footballer) =

Brazilian footballer (1912–1949)

Personal information
- Full name: Sezefredo da Costa
- Date of birth: 7 November 1912
- Place of birth: Santa Vitória do Palmar, Brazil
- Date of death: 4 August 1949 (aged 36)
- Position: Forward

International career
Years	Team	Apps	(Gls)
1937	Brazil	2	(0)

Sezefredo da Costa (7 November 1912 – 4 August 1949), known as Cardeal, was a Brazilian footballer. He played in two matches for the Brazil national football team in 1937. He was also part of Brazil's squad for the 1937 South American Championship.
