= Mica (footballer, born 1904) =

Brazilian footballer (1904–1989)

Personal information
- Full name: Alfredo Pereira de Mello
- Date of birth: 15 October 1904
- Place of birth: Salvador, Brazil
- Date of death: 10 March 1989 (aged 84)
- Place of death: Salvador, Brazil
- Position: Midfielder

Senior career*
Years	Team	Apps	(Gls)
1921	Yankee Salvador		
1922–1923	Botafogo-BA		
1924–1925	AA Bahia		

International career
1923	Brazil	6	(0)
- * Club domestic league appearances and goals

Alfredo Pereira de Mello, commonly known as Mica, (15 October 1904 – 10 March 1989) was a Brazilian footballer who played as a midfielder. Mica is considered one of the best players that the baiano football ever produced and one of its first heroes. He also was a member of the Brazilian squad at the 1923 Copa America.

== Club career ==
Mica started his career with Yankee Salvador and won the Torneio Início da Bahia of 1921. Botafogo-BA which was one of the biggest clubs in Bahia at the time signed him in 1922 and he led them to two championship titles.

== International career ==
Mica played in the 1923 Copa America alongside legendary Nilo, but Brazil eventually finished fourth. He was the first player outside the Rio-São Paulo states to be called up to the Brazil national team. No footballer from Bahia would play for the national team until 1987.

== Honours ==
- Torneio Início da Bahia: 1921
- Campeonato Baiano: 1922, 1923, 1924
