= Torteroli =

Brazilian footballer

Torterolli
Personal information
- Full name: Nicomedes da Conceição
- Date of birth: 24 March 1899
- Position: Midfielder

Senior career*
Years	Team	Apps	(Gls)
1916–1919	Engenho de Dentro		
1920–1928	Vasco da Gama	164	(58)
1929–1930	Vasco da Gama (aspirantes)		

International career
1923	Brazil	1	(0)
- * Club domestic league appearances and goals

Nicomedes da Conceição (24 March 1899 – 28 October 1933), known as Torterolli, was a Brazilian footballer. He played in one match for the Brazil national football team in 1923. He was also part of Brazil's squad for the 1923 South American Championship.

== Honours ==
Engenho de Dentro

- Campeonato Suburbano do Rio de Janeiro de Futebol: 1916, 1917 e 1918

Vasco da Gama

- Campeonato Carioca - Série A2: 1922
- Campeonato Carioca: 1923 e 1924
- Torneio Início do Rio de Janeiro: 1926
