= Nesi (footballer) =

Brazilian footballer (1902–?)

Personal information
- Full name: Luiz Ferreira Nesi
- Date of birth: 15 November 1902
- Place of birth: Rio de Janeiro, Brazil
- Position: Midfielder

Senior career*
Years	Team	Apps	(Gls)
1920–1926	São Cristóvão		
1926–1930	Vasco da Gama		

International career
1922–1923	Brazil	8	(0)
- * Club domestic league appearances and goals

Luiz Ferreira Nesi (born 15 November 1902, date of death unknown), known as just Nesi, was a Brazilian footballer who played as a midfielder. He made eight appearances for the Brazil national team in 1922 and 1923. He was also part of Brazil's squad for the 1922 South American Championship. As well as playing for both São Cristóvão and Vasco da Gama during his club career.
