= Pennaforte =

Brazilian footballer (1905–1947)

Personal information
- Full name: Orlando Pennaforte de Araujo
- Date of birth: 19 April 1905
- Place of birth: Rio de Janeiro, Brazil
- Date of death: 25 November 1947 (aged 42)
- Position: Defender

Senior career*
Years	Team	Apps	(Gls)
- América-RJ
- Flamengo

International career
1923–1925	Brazil	8	(0)
- * Club domestic league appearances and goals

Orlando Pennaforte de Araujo (19 April 1905 – 25 November 1947), known as just Pennaforte, was a Brazilian footballer who played as a defender. He made eight appearances for the Brazil national team from 1923 to 1925. He was also part of Brazil's squad for the 1923 South American Championship.
