= Nélson da Conceição =

Brazilian footballer (1898–1942)

Nelson da Conceição
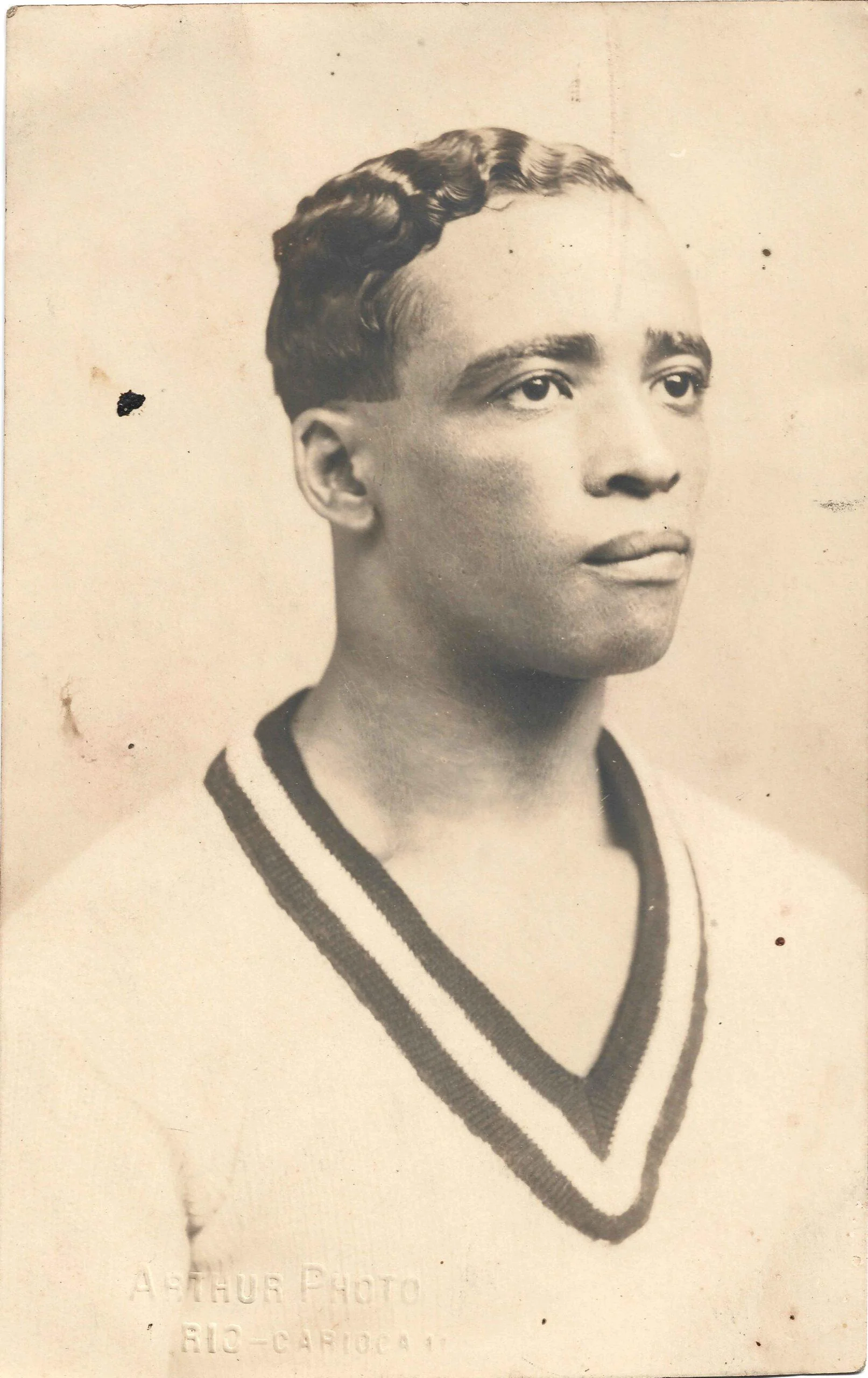

Personal information
- Date of birth: 12 August 1898
- Position: Goalkeeper

Senior career*
Years	Team	Apps	(Gls)
1915	Paladino		
1916–1918	Engenho de Dentro		
1919–1927	Vasco da Gama	192	(0)

International career
1923	Brazil	6	(0)
- * Club domestic league appearances and goals

Nelson da Conceição (born 12 August 1898, date of death 24 May 1942) was a Brazilian footballer. He played in six matches for the Brazil national football team in 1923. He was also part of Brazil's squad for the 1923 South American Championship.

== Honours ==
Engenho de Dentro

- Campeonato Suburbano do Rio de Janeiro de Futebol: 1916, 1917 e 1918

Vasco da Gama

- Campeonato Carioca - Série A2: 1922
- Campeonato Carioca: 1923 e 1924
- Torneio Início do Rio de Janeiro: 1926

Seleção Brasileira

- Copa Confraternidad: 1923
- Taça Rodrigues Alves: 1923
