= Celestino Martínez (footballer) =

Argentine footballer

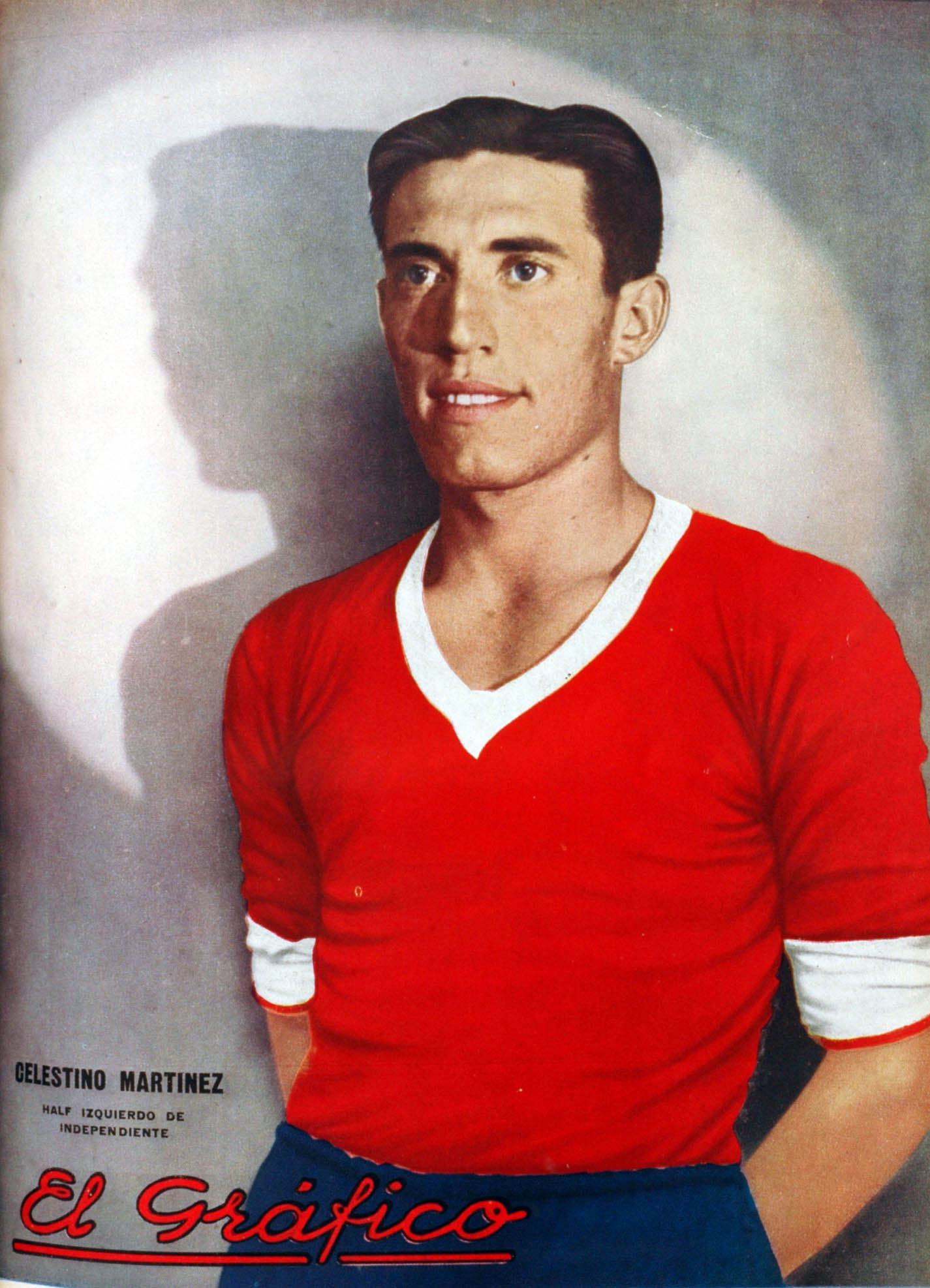
- Celestino in 1936

Personal information
- Date of birth: 7 May 1914
- Position: Defender

International career
Years	Team	Apps	(Gls)
1937–1943	Argentina	13	(0)

Celestino Martínez (born 7 May 1914, date of death unknown) was an Argentine footballer. He played in 13 matches for the Argentina national football team from 1937 to 1943. He was also part of Argentina's squad for the 1937 South American Championship.
