= Alemão (footballer, born 1904) =

Brazilian footballer (1904–1975)

Personal information
- Full name: Sylvio Serpa
- Date of birth: 21 January 1904
- Place of birth: Rio de Janeiro, Brazil
- Date of death: 26 August 1975 (aged 71)
- Position: Central defender

Senior career*
Years	Team	Apps	(Gls)
- Botafogo

International career
1923	Brazil	6	(0)
- * Club domestic league appearances and goals

Sylvio Serpa (21 January 1904 – 26 August 1975), known as just Alemão, was a Brazilian footballer who played as a central defender for Botafogo. He made six appearances for the Brazil national team in 1923. He was also part of Brazil's squad for the 1923 South American Championship.
