= Carnera (footballer) =

Brazilian footballer (1908–1986)

Personal information
- Full name: Domingos Spitaletti
- Date of birth: 22 November 1908
- Place of birth: São Paulo, Brazil
- Date of death: 7 July 1986 (aged 77)
- Position: Defender

International career
Years	Team	Apps	(Gls)
1937	Brazil	3	(0)

Domingos Spitaletti (22 November 1908 – 7 July 1986), better known as Carnera, was a Brazilian footballer. He played in three matches for the Brazil national football team in 1937. He was also part of Brazil's squad for the 1937 South American Championship.
