= Amaro (Brazilian footballer) =

Brazilian footballer

Personal information
- Full name: Amaro da Silveira
- Date of birth: 11 October 1901

International career
Years	Team	Apps	(Gls)
1923	Brazil	6	(0)

Amaro da Silveira (born 11 October 1901, date of death unknown), known as just Amaro, was a Brazilian footballer. He played in six matches for the Brazil national football team in 1923. He was also part of Brazil's squad for the 1923 South American Championship.
