= Jaú (footballer) =

Brazilian footballer

Personal information
- Full name: Euclydes Barbosa
- Date of birth: 17 December 1909
- Place of birth: Brazil
- Date of death: 26 February 1988 (aged 78)
- Position: Defender

Senior career*
Years	Team	Apps	(Gls)
1934–1938	Corinthians		
1938–1942	Vasco da Gama		
- Santos

International career
- Brazil
Medal record
Representing Brazil
FIFA World Cup
Third place	1938 France
- * Club domestic league appearances and goals

Euclydes Barbosa, known by the nickname Jaú (Portuguese: [ʒaˈu]; December 17, 1909, São Paulo – February 26, 1988) was an association footballer who played in the central defender position.

In his career, he played for Brazilian teams Corinthians (1934–1938), Vasco da Gama (1938–1942) and Santos FC.

He won two São Paulo State Leagues (1937, 1938), Torneio Internacional Luiz Aranha (1940) and one Torneio Início do Rio de Janeiro (1942). Jaú was on the Brazil national football team roster for the 1938 FIFA World Cup where he played one match.

During his life, Jaú was persecuted by the Brazilian governments due to his practice of Umbanda. He died at age 78.
