= Jurandir (footballer, born 1912) =

Brazilian footballer (1912–1972)

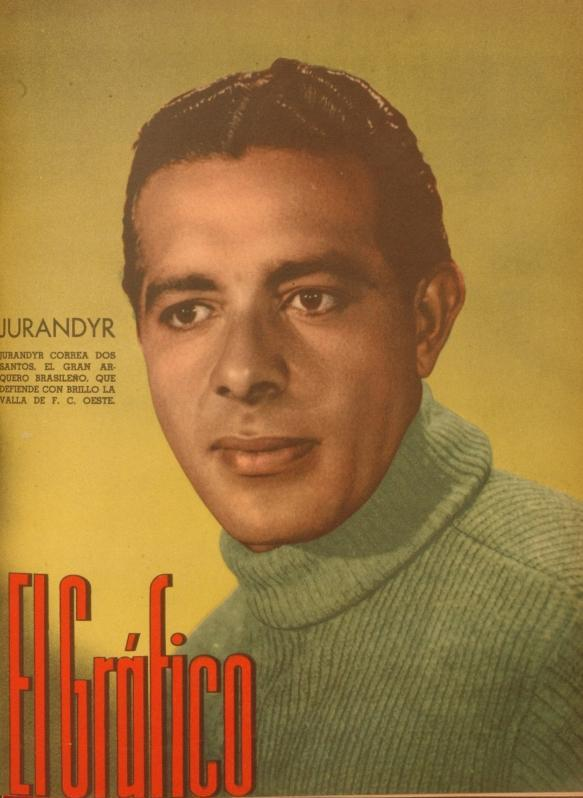

Personal information
- Full name: Jurandir Corrêa dos Santos
- Date of birth: 26 April 1912
- Place of birth: São Paulo, Brazil
- Date of death: 4 March 1972 (aged 59)
- Place of death: São Paulo, Brazil
- Position: Goalkeeper

Senior career*
Years	Team	Apps	(Gls)
1930–1933	São Bento		
1934	Fluminense		
1934–1935	São Paulo	17	(0)
1935–1939	Palestra Italia		
1940	Ferro Carril Oeste		
1941	Gimnasia de La Plata		
1942–1946	Flamengo		
1946	Corinthians		
1947	Comercial-SP		

International career
1937–1944	Brazil	8	(0)
- * Club domestic league appearances and goals

Jurandir Corrêa dos Santos (26 April 1912 – 4 March 1972), known as just Jurandir, was a Brazilian footballer who played as a goalkeeper. He made eight appearances for the Brazil national team from 1937 to 1944. He was also part of Brazil's squad for the 1937 South American Championship.
