= Luis Fazio =

Argentine footballer

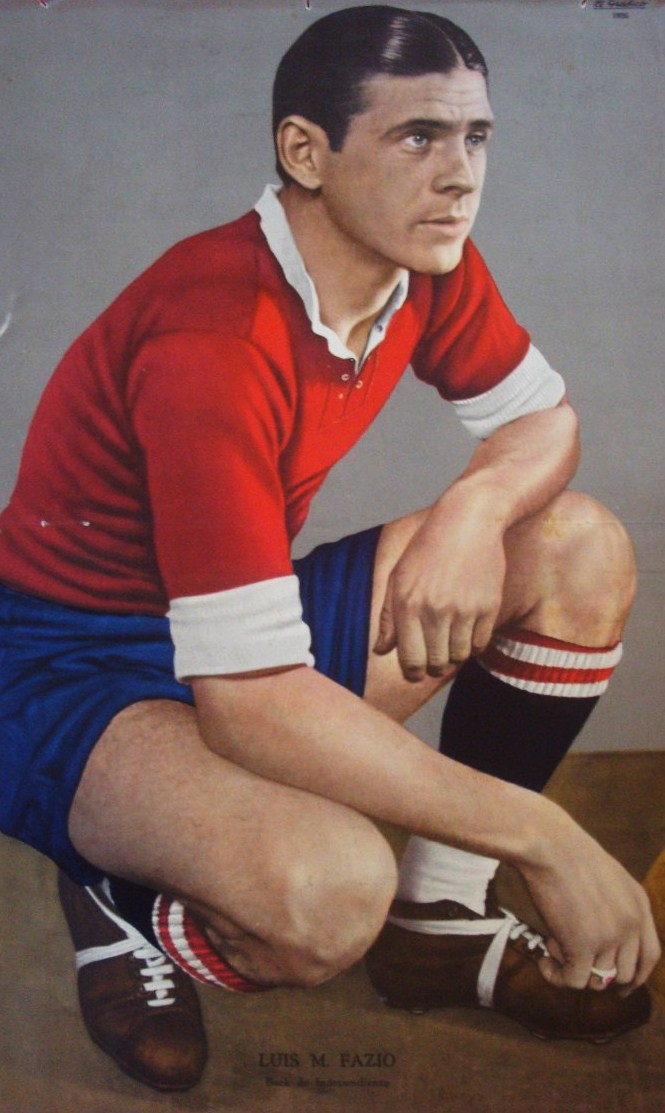

Personal information
- Date of birth: 23 April 1911
- Position: Defender

International career
Years	Team	Apps	(Gls)
1937	Argentina	2	(0)

Luis Fazio (born 23 April 1911, date of death unknown) was an Argentine footballer. He played in two matches for the Argentina national football team in 1937. He was also part of Argentina's squad for the 1937 South American Championship.
