= 1937 in Brazilian football =

Football in Brazil
- Season: 1937

The following article presents a summary of the 1937 football (soccer) season in Brazil, which was the 36th season of competitive football in the country.

== Campeonato Paulista ==
Final Stage

Position	Team	Points	Played	Won	Drawn	Lost	For	Against	Difference
1	Corinthians	22	14	10	2	2	33	14	19
2	Palestra Itália-SP	21	14	10	1	3	35	12	23
3	Portuguesa Santista	19	14	8	3	3	27	18	9
4	Estudantes Paulista	15	14	7	1	6	33	22	11
5	Santos	14	14	5	4	5	27	20	7
6	Juventus	11	14	4	3	7	23	28	-5

Corinthians declared as the Campeonato Paulista champions.

== Campeonato Carioca ==
Pos	Team	Pld	W	D	L	GF	GA	GD	Pts	Qualification or relegation
1	Fluminense	22	17	4	1	65	22	+43	38	Champions
2	Flamengo	22	15	5	2	83	34	+49	35	
3	Vasco da Gama	22	13	4	5	84	42	+42	30	
4	Botafogo	22	12	4	6	67	31	+36	28	
5	São Cristóvão	22	12	4	6	67	35	+32	28	
6	América	22	11	6	5	66	38	+28	28	
7	Madureira	22	10	3	9	54	46	+8	23	
8	Portuguesa	22	6	3	13	42	70	−28	15	
9	Bonsucesso	22	6	3	13	32	77	−45	15	
10	Olaria	22	4	3	15	37	90	−53	11	
11	Bangu	22	4	2	16	28	61	−33	10	
12	Andarahy	22	1	1	20	29	108	−79	3	

Updated to match(es) played on January 30, 1938. Source: RSSSF.com
Rules for classification: 1) points; 2) goal difference; 3) wins; 4) number of goals scored.

Fluminense declared as the Campeonato Carioca champions.

== State championship champions ==
State	Champion	State	Champion
Acre	-	Paraíba	Botafogo-PB
Alagoas	CRB	Paraná	Ferroviário-PR
Amapá	-	Pernambuco	Tramways-PE
Amazonas	Nacional	Piauí	-
Bahia	Galícia	Rio de Janeiro	Alliança
Ceará	Fortaleza	Rio de Janeiro (DF)	Fluminense
Espírito Santo	Rio Branco-ES	Rio Grande do Norte	ABC
Goiás	-	Rio Grande do Sul	Grêmio Santanense
Maranhão	Maranhão	Rondônia	-
Mato Grosso	-	Santa Catarina	Figueirense
Minas Gerais	Siderúrgica	São Paulo	Corinthians
Pará	Tuna Luso	Sergipe	Sergipe

== Brazil national team ==
The following table lists all the games played by the Brazil national football team in official competitions and friendly matches during 1937.

Date	Opposition	Result	Score	Brazil scorers	Competition
January 3, 1937	Chile	W	6-4	Luisinho (2), Patesko (2), Carvalho Leite, Roberto	South American Championship
January 13, 1937	Paraguay	W	5-0	Luisinho (2), Patesko (2), Carvalho Leite	South American Championship
January 19, 1937	Uruguay	W	3-2	Bahia, Carvalho Leite, Niginho	South American Championship
January 30, 1937	Argentina	L	0-1	-	South American Championship
February 1, 1937	Argentina	L	0-2	-	South American Championship
