= 1937 South American Championship =

Football tournament

Tournament details
- Host country: Argentina
- Dates: 27 December 1936 – 1 February 1937
- Teams: 6 (from 1 confederation)
- Venues: 2 (in 1 host city)

Final positions
- Champions: Argentina (5th title)
- Runners-up: Brazil
- Third place: Uruguay
- Fourth place: Paraguay

Tournament statistics
- Matches played: 16
- Goals scored: 69 (4.31 per match)
- Top scorer(s): (Chile) Raúl Toro (7 goals)

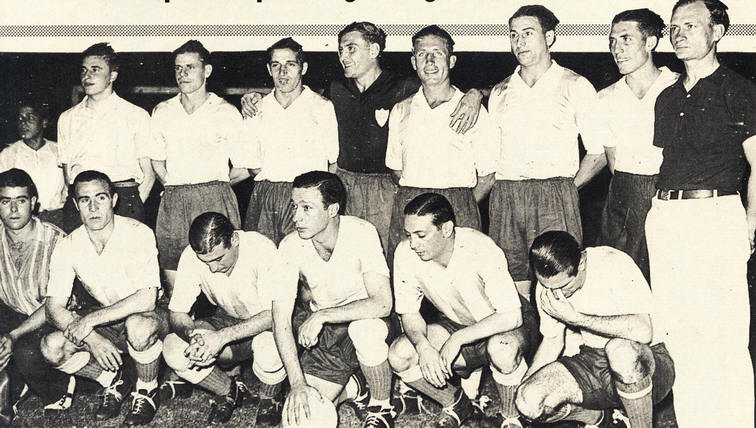
The Argentina squad

The fourteenth edition of the South American Championship of football was held in Buenos Aires, Argentina from 27 December 1936 to 1 February 1937.

The participating countries were Argentina, Brazil, Chile, Paraguay, Peru, and Uruguay thus making this the first edition in which more than five teams took part of the event.

Bolivia, and Colombia (a new CONMEBOL member) withdrew from the tournament.

Because of the summer heat, most of the matches were played at night, with Estadio Gasómetro being one of the few stadiums in Argentina with artificial lighting at the time, while other games were played during daytime at Estadio Alvear y Tagle.

== Squads ==
For a complete list of participants squads see: 1937 South American Championship squads

== Venues ==
Buenos Aires
Estadio Gasómetro de Boedo	Estadio Alvear y Tagle	Estadio Brandsen y Del Crucero
Capacity: 75,000	Capacity: 40,000	Capacity: 25,000

== Final round ==
Each team played against each of the other teams. Two points were awarded for a win, one point for a draw and zero points for a defeat.

Team	Pld	W	D	L	GF	GA	GD	Pts
Argentina	5	4	0	1	12	5	+7	8
Brazil	5	4	0	1	17	9	+8	8
Uruguay	5	2	0	3	11	14	−3	4
Paraguay	5	2	0	3	8	16	−8	4
Chile	5	1	1	3	12	13	−1	3
Peru	5	1	1	3	7	10	−3	3

As Brazil and Argentina finished tied in points, a playoff was required to determine the champion.

27 December 1936

Brazil	3–2	Peru
Roberto 7'; Afonsinho 30'; Niginho 57'		T. Fernández 55'; Villanueva 58'

Estadio Gasómetro, Buenos Aires
Referee: Alfredo Vargas (Chile)

30 December 1936

Argentina	2–1	Chile
Varallo 30', 43'		Toro 73'

Estadio Gasómetro, Buenos Aires
Referee: Aníbal Tejada (Uruguay)

2 January 1937

Paraguay	4–2	Uruguay
A. Ortega 9', 79'; A. González 35'; Erico 38' (pen.)		Varela 16', 28'

Estadio Gasómetro, Buenos Aires
Referee: Virgílio Antônio Fedrighi (Brazil)

3 January 1937

Brazil	6–4	Chile
Patesko 2', 26'; Carvalho Leite 6'; Luisinho 35', 40'; Roberto 68'		Avendaño 19'; Toro 25', 73'; Riveros 40'

Estadio Brandsen y Del Crucero, Buenos Aires
Referee: José Bartolomé Macías (Argentina)

6 January 1937

Uruguay	4–2	Peru
Camaití 16'; Varela 31', 56'; Píriz 79'		T. Fernández 29'; Magallanes 40'

Estadio Gasómetro, Buenos Aires
Referee: Alfredo Vargas (Chile)

9 January 1937

Argentina	6–1	Paraguay
Scopelli 5', 54'; García 8'; Zozaya 33', 75', 82'		A. González 86'

Estadio Gasómetro, Buenos Aires
Referee: Aníbal Tejada (Uruguay)

10 January 1937

Uruguay	0–3	Chile
		Toro 17', 83'; Arancibia 59'

Estadio Gasómetro, Buenos Aires
Referee: José Bartolomé Macías (Argentina)

13 January 1937

Brazil	5–0	Paraguay
Patesko 31', 67'; Luisinho 42', 51'; Carvalho Leite 59'

Estadio Gasómetro, Buenos Aires
Referee: José Bartolomé Macías (Argentina)

16 January 1937

Argentina	1–0	Peru
Zozaya 55'

Estadio Gasómetro, Buenos Aires
Referee: Aníbal Tejada (Uruguay)

17 January 1937

Paraguay	3–2	Chile
Amarilla 5'; Flor 47'; Núñez Velloso 78'		Toro 8', 32'

Estadio Gasómetro, Buenos Aires
Referee: Aníbal Tejada (Uruguay)

19 January 1937

Brazil	3–2	Uruguay
Carvalho Leite 36'; Bahia 72'; Niginho 77'		Villadóniga 1'; Píriz 66'

Estadio Gasómetro, Buenos Aires
Referee: José Bartolomé Macías (Argentina)

21 January 1937

Peru	2–2	Chile
J. Alcalde 1', 26'		Torres 16'; Arancibia 70'

Estadio Gasómetro, Buenos Aires
Referee: José Bartolomé Macías (Argentina)

23 January 1937

Argentina	2–3	Uruguay
Varallo 63'; Zozaya 68'		Ithurbide 5'; Píriz 51'; Varela 58'

Estadio Gasómetro, Buenos Aires
Referee: Alfredo Vargas (Chile)

24 January 1937

Paraguay	0–1	Peru
		Lavalle 43'

Estadio Alvear y Tagle, Buenos Aires
Referee: Aníbal Tejada (Uruguay)

30 January 1937

Argentina	1–0	Brazil
García 48'

Estadio Gasómetro, Buenos Aires
Referee: Aníbal Tejada (Uruguay)

=== Play-off ===
1 February 1937

Argentina	2–0 (a.e.t.)	Brazil
De la Mata 108', 112'

Estadio Gasómetro, Buenos Aires
Attendance: 80,000
Referee: Aníbal Tejada (Uruguay)

== Result ==
1937 South American Championship champions

Argentina
Fifth title

== Goal scorers ==
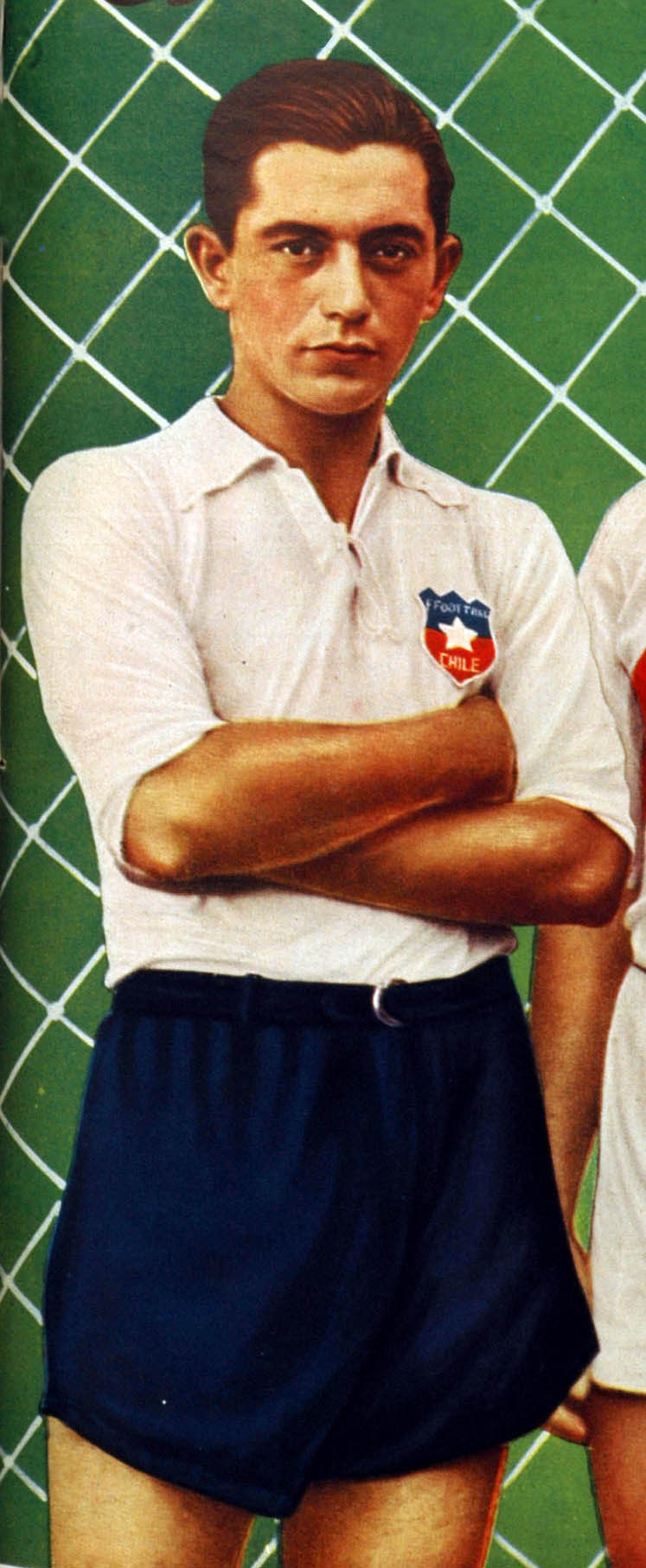
Raúl Toro, top scorer

7 goals

- (Chile) Raúl Toro

5 goals

- (Argentina) Alberto Zozaya
- (Uruguay) Severino Varela

4 goals

- (Brazil) Luisinho
- (Brazil) Patesko

3 goals

- (Argentina) Francisco Varallo
- (Brazil) Carvalho Leite
- (Uruguay) Juan Píriz

2 goals

- (Argentina) Vicente de la Mata
- (Argentina) Enrique García
- (Argentina) Alejandro Scopelli
- (Brazil) Niginho
- (Brazil) Roberto
- (Paraguay) Aurelio González
- (Paraguay) Amadeo Ortega
- (Peru) Teodoro Fernández
- (Peru) Jorge Alcalde

1 goal

- (Brazil) Afonsinho
- (Brazil) Bahia
- (Chile) Manuel Arancibia
- (Chile) José Avendaño
- (Chile) Arturo Carmona
- (Chile) Guillermo Riveros
- (Chile) Guillermo Torres
- (Paraguay) Juan Amarilla
- (Paraguay) Adolfo Erico
- (Paraguay) Martín Flor
- (Paraguay) Raúl Núñez Velloso
- (Peru) Alejandro Villanueva
- (Peru) Adolfo Magallanes
- (Peru) Jose Maria Lavalle
- (Uruguay) Adelaido Camaiti
- (Uruguay) Eduardo Ithurbide
- (Uruguay) Segundo Villadóniga
