= List of foreign Ligue 1 players: U =

This is a list of foreign players in the French Ligue 1, which commenced play in 1932. The following players must meet both of the following two criteria:

1. Have played at least one Ligue 1 game. Players who were signed by Ligue 1 clubs, but only played in lower league, cup and/or European games, or did not play in any competitive games at all, are not included.
2. Are considered foreign, i.e., outside France and its dependencies (Guadeloupe, Martinique, Reunion Island or French Polynesia), determined by the following:

A player is considered foreign if he is not eligible to play for the national teams of France.

More specifically,

- If a player has been capped on international level, the national team is used; if he has been capped by more than one country, the highest level (or the most recent) team is used. These include French players with dual citizenship. Players who played for France but came as foreign players (such as Miguel Ángel Lauri) are also listed.
- If a player has not been capped on international level, his country of birth is used, except those who were born abroad from French parents or moved to France at a young age, and those who clearly indicated to have switched his nationality to another nation.

Clubs listed are those that the player has played at least one Ligue 1 game for.

Seasons listed are those that the player has played at least one Ligue 1 game in. Note that seasons, not calendar years, are used. For example, "1992–95" indicates that the player has played in every season from 1992–93 to 1994–95, but not necessarily every calendar year from 1992 to 1995.

In bold: players still active in Ligue 1 and their respective teams in current season.

== Ukraine ==
- Danylo Ihnatenko – Bordeaux – 2021–22
- Mykola Kukharevych – Troyes – 2021–22
- Maksym Levytskyi – Saint-Étienne – 2000–01
- Ruslan Malinovskyi – Marseille – 2022–23
- Pierre Pchenitchy – Marseille – 1951–52
- Serhiy Skachenko – Metz – 1999–2002
- Oleksandr Skotsen – Nice – 1948–50
- Eduard Sobol – Strasbourg – 2022–25
- Pavlo Yakovenko – Sochaux – 1992–94
- Yuriy Yakovenko – Ajaccio – 2013–14
- Roman Yaremchuk – Lyon – 2025–26
- **Illia Zabarnyi** – **Paris SG** – 2025–
- Oleksandr Zavarov – AS Nancy – 1990–92

== United Kingdom ==
These players did play in Ligue 1, but due to a lack of information are listed here:

- Sydney Bazin – Sochaux – 1932–34
- Arthur Charles Finn – Cannes – 1935–36
- Russell – Valenciennes – 1935–36
- Springfield – Mulhouse – 1935–36
- Whitehouse – Valenciennes – 1935–36

== United States ==
- Freddy Adu – Monaco – 2008–09
- **Folarin Balogun** – Reims, **Monaco** – 2022–
- Alejandro Bedoya – Nantes – 2013–16
- Carlos Bocanegra – Rennes, Saint-Étienne – 2008–11
- Charlie Davies – Sochaux – 2009–10
- Konrad de la Fuente – Marseille – 2021–22
- Joe Gaetjens – RC Paris – 1951–52
- Nicholas Gioacchini – Montpellier – 2021–22
- **Mark McKenzie** – **Toulouse** – 2024–
- Matt Miazga – Nantes – 2018–19
- Ilija Mitic – Marseille – 1969–70
- Erik Palmer-Brown – Troyes – 2021–23
- David Regis – Valenciennes, Strasbourg, Lens, Metz, Troyes – 1992–97, 1998–2003
- **Giovanni Reyna** – **Strasbourg** – 2026–
- **Bryan Reynolds** – **Rennes** – 2026–
- Emmanuel Sabbi – Le Havre – 2023–25
- Jordan Siebatcheu – Reims, Rennes – 2014–16, 2018–20, 2024–25
- **Tanner Tessmann** – **Lyon** – 2024–
- Greg Vanney – Bastia – 2001–05
- **Timothy Weah** – Paris SG, Lille, **Marseille** – 2017–23, 2025–
- Quentin Westberg – Troyes – 2006–07
- Caleb Wiley – Strasbourg – 2024–25

== United Arab Emirates ==
- Junior Ndiaye – Montpellier – 2024–25

== Uruguay ==
- Carlos Acevedo – AS Nancy – 1977–78
- Mauro Arambarri – Bordeaux – 2015–17
- Juan Pedro Ascery – Nice – 1972–81
- Santiago Bessonnart – Troyes, Bordeaux, Béziers, Alès, Nîmes Olympique, Montpellier – 1954–56, 1957–59, 1961–63
- Edgar Borges – Lille – 1992–94
- Carlos Bueno – Paris SG – 2005–06
- Erick Cabaco – Nancy – 2016–17
- Wilmar Cabrera – Nice – 1986–87
- José Carrabelo – Montpellier – 1961–63
- Daniel Carreño – Lens – 1985–87
- Edinson Cavani – Paris SG – 2013–20
- Javier Chevantón – Monaco – 2004–06
- Oscar Cobas – Monaco – 1961–62
- Pablo Correa – AS Nancy – 1996–97
- José Dalmao – Nantes – 1992–93
- Oratio Diaz – Red Star – 1932–33
- Juan Duarte – Rennes – 1972–74
- Horacio Finamore – Red Star – 1932–33, 1934–35
- Andrés Fleurquin – Rennes – 2002–03
- Enzo Francescoli – RC Paris, Marseille – 1986–89
- Mauro Goicoechea – Toulouse – 2015–17, 2018–20
- Nacho González – AS Monaco – 2007–08
- Walter Guglielmone – Ajaccio – 2002–03
- Adrián Gunino – Toulouse – 2010–11
- Carlos Javier Gutiérrez – Stade Français – 1949–50
- Jonathan Iglesias – Clermont – 2021–22
- Ramon Jose Irrigaray – Sochaux – 1938–39, 1945–46
- Eduardo Ithurbide – Sochaux – 1937–38
- Gary Kagelmacher – Valenciennes – 2013–14
- Luis La Paz – Marseille – 1949–50, 1952–53
- Juan Andrés Larre – Niort – 1987–88
- Pierino Lattuada – Bordeaux – 1972–77
- Diego Lugano – Paris SG – 2011–12
- Damián Macaluso – AS Nancy – 2006–10
- Ildo Maneiro – Lyon – 1973–76
- Hugo Martinez – Sochaux – 1949–50, 1952–53
- Williams Martínez – Valenciennes – 2007–08
- Juan Mujica – Lille, Lens – 1973–78
- Sergio Panzardo – Caen – 1989–90
- Rubén Paz – RC Paris – 1986–87
- Pedro Pedrucci – Laval – 1984–85
- Diego Pérez – AS Monaco – 2004–10
- Facundo Píriz – Montpellier – 2017–19
- Ignacio Ramírez – Saint-Étienne – 2021–22
- Venancio Ramos – Lens – 1984–87
- Cristian Rodríguez – Paris SG – 2005–07
- Guillermo Rodríguez – Lens – 2005–06
- Sergio Rodríguez Viera – Stade Français – 1949–51
- Agustín Rogel – Toulouse – 2019–20
- Diego Rolán – Bordeaux – 2012–17
- Conrad Ross – Sochaux – 1934–35
- Adrian Sarkissian – AS Nancy – 2005–08
- Martín Satriano – Brest, Lens, Lyon – 2021–22, 2023–26
- Gorki Silvetti – Toulouse FC (1937) – 1946–47
- José Suarez – Nice – 1967–68
- Mathías Suárez – Montpellier – 2018–20
- Manuel Ugarte – Paris SG – 2023–24
- Rubén Umpiérrez – AS Nancy, RC Paris – 1978–85, 1986–89
- Gonzalo Vargas – AS Monaco, Sochaux – 2006–08

== USSR ==
This player did play in Ligue 1, but due to a lack of information is listed here:

- Pavel Makarov – Nîmes Olympique – 1950–51

== Uzbekistan ==
- Abdukodir Khusanov – Lens – 2023–25

== References and notes ==
=== Books ===
- Barreaud, Marc (1998). Dictionnaire des footballeurs étrangers du championnat professionnel français (1932-1997). L'Harmattan, Paris. ISBN 2-7384-6608-7.
- Tamás Dénes; Pál Peterdi; Zoltán Rochy; József Selmeci (1999). Kalandozó magyar labdarúgók. ISBN 963-85967-0-8.

=== Club pages ===
- AJ Auxerre former players
- AJ Auxerre former players
- Girondins de Bordeaux former players
- Girondins de Bordeaux former players
- Les ex-Tangos (joueurs), Stade Lavallois former players
- Olympique Lyonnais former players
- Olympique de Marseille former players
- FC Metz former players
- AS Monaco FC former players
- Ils ont porté les couleurs de la Paillade... Montpellier HSC Former players
- AS Nancy former players
- FC Nantes former players
- Paris SG former players
- Red Star Former players
- Red Star former players
- Stade de Reims former players
- Stade Rennais former players
- CO Roubaix-Tourcoing former players
- AS Saint-Étienne former players
- Sporting Toulon Var former players

=== Others ===
- stat2foot
- footballenfrance
- French Clubs' Players in European Cups 1955-1995, RSSSF
- Finnish players abroad, RSSSF
- Italian players abroad, RSSSF
- Romanians who played in foreign championships
- Swiss players in France, RSSSF
- EURO 2008 CONNECTIONS: FRANCE, Stephen Byrne Bristol Rovers official site

== Notes ==
1. Born in France
2. Born in Ghana
3. Born in Haiti
4. Born in Italy
5. Born in Kazakhstan (then part of the Soviet Union)
6. Born in Martinique (Overseas territory of the French Republic)
7. Born in Russia (then part of the Soviet Union)
8. Born in Serbia (then part of the Kingdom of Serbia)
9. Capped for the France national under-21 football team
10. Capped for the Haiti national football team
11. Capped for the Poland national under-18 football team
