= 1931 Argentine Primera División =

40th season of top-tier football league in Argentina

Primera División
- Season: 1931
- Dates: 31 May 1931 – 6 January 1932
- Champions: Estudiantil Porteño (AFA); Boca Juniors (LAF)

The 1931 Primera División season was the 40th season of top-flight football in Argentina and the first to be professional in the country, after eighteen clubs broke away from the amateur league structure to form the professional league, "Liga Argentina de Football" (LAF). The inaugural champions was Boca Juniors led by coach Mario Fortunato. The top scorer of the championship was Alberto Zozaya of Estudiantes de La Plata with 33 goals.

The official body (AFA) remained amateur under the denomination "Asociación Amateurs Argentina de Football".

== Final tables ==
=== Asociación Argentina de Football (AFA) ===
The championship had originally started on May 10, 1931 with 34 teams competing. After the first run was played, 19 teams disjoined the league to move to recently created Liga Argentina de Football (professional); they were Argentinos Juniors, Atlanta, Boca Juniors, Chacarita Juniors, Defensores de Belgrano, Estudiantes LP, Ferro Carril Oeste, Gimnasia y Esgrima LP, Huracán, Independiente, Lanús, Platense, Quilmes, Racing, River Plate, San Lorenzo, Talleres (RE), Tigre, and Vélez Sarsfield.

Primera División (AFA)
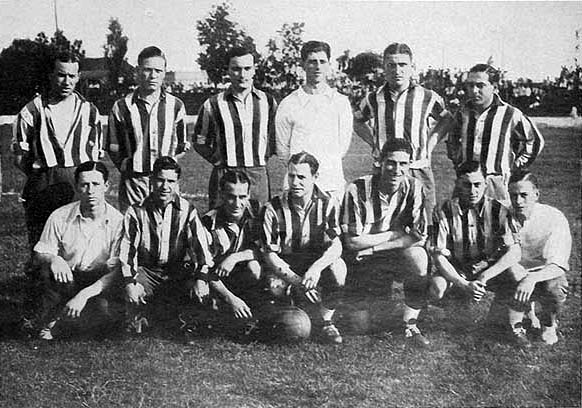
- Estudiantil Porteño, AFA champions
- Season: 1931
- Dates: 28 June – 27 December
- Champions: Estudiantil Porteño (1st title)
- Promoted: Nueva Chicago
- Relegated: San Fernando
- Matches: 306
- Goals: 1,093 (3.57 per match)
- Top goalscorer: (Argentina) José Ciancio (Almagro) (14 goals)
- Biggest home win: Sp. Barracas 7–2 S. Fernando (19 Jul)
- Biggest away win: S. Fernando 0–6 Almagro (12 Jul
- Highest scoring: S. Fernando 3–7 El Porvenir (29 Nov

Pos	Team	Pld	W	D	L	GF	GA	GD	Pts
1	Almagro	15	13	0	2	45	13	+32	26 (Note: Championship playoff)
2	Estudiantil Porteño	15	12	2	1	31	17	+14	26
3	Sportivo Buenos Aires	15	11	0	4	26	16	+10	22
4	El Porvenir	15	9	3	3	34	20	+14	21
5	Excursionistas	15	7	3	5	36	27	+9	17
6	Nueva Chicago	15	7	3	5	22	24	−2	17
7	Argentino (Q)	15	7	2	6	24	24	0	16
8	Sportivo Palermo	15	6	3	6	24	23	+1	15
9	Sportivo Barracas	15	5	4	6	35	30	+5	14
10	Barracas Central	15	5	4	6	22	26	−4	14
11	Estudiantes (BA)	15	5	3	7	20	23	−3	13
12	Colegiales	15	4	5	6	20	26	−6	13
13	Defensores de Belgrano	15	3	3	9	13	19	−6	9
14	Banfield	15	3	3	9	21	37	−16	9
15	Argentino (B)	15	2	2	11	12	25	−13	6
16	San Fernando	15	1	0	14	13	48	−35	2

=== Championship playoff ===
Estudiantil Porteño and Almagro finished level on points at the top of the table, so a championship playoff was played to proclaim a champion.

==== Final ====
27 December 1931

Estudiantil Porteño	3-1	Almagro
F. Martínez 25', 84'; Bissio 70'	Report	M. Fernández 42'

Sp. Barracas
Attendance: 4,000
Referee: Cirilo Garigliano

Estudiantil Porteño
Almagro

GK	José Bolgues
DF	José Migliozzi
DF	Alberto Bellomo
MF	Pedro Martínez
MF	Fidel Corátolo
MF	José Gargiulo
FW	Raúl Costa
FW	Julio Bissio
FW	Francisco Martínez
FW	Oscar Mapelli
FW	Carlos Spadaro
Manager:

GK	Cándido De Nicola
DF	Francisco Santoro
DF	Humberto Recantini
MF	Mateo Fernández
MF	Carlos Gros
MF	José Aceto
FW	Héctor Oro
FW	Vicente Pérez
FW	Félix Varalli
FW	José Ciancio
FW	Oscar Correa
Manager:

=== Liga Argentina de Football ===
Primera División (LAF)
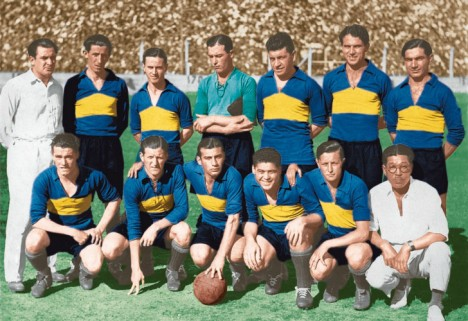
- Boca Juniors, LAF champions
- Season: 1931
- Dates: 31 May 1931 – 6 January 1932
- Champions: Boca Juniors (7th title)
- Relegated: (none)
- Top goalscorer: (Argentina) Alberto Zozaya (33)
- Biggest home win: Racing 6–0 Vélez (14 Jun)
- Biggest away win: Ferro 2–6 Huracán (4 Oct)

Pos	Team	Pld	W	D	L	GF	GA	GD	Pts
1	Boca Juniors	34	22	6	6	85	49	+36	50
2	San Lorenzo	34	19	7	8	81	52	+29	45
3	Estudiantes (LP)	34	20	4	10	103	51	+52	44
4	River Plate	34	19	6	9	63	39	+24	44
5	Racing	34	19	5	10	81	51	+30	43
6	Independiente	34	18	7	9	69	60	+9	43
7	Chacarita Juniors	34	18	6	10	63	58	+5	42
8	Huracán	34	13	7	14	58	49	+9	33
9	Vélez Sarsfield	34	13	7	14	63	68	−5	33
10	Ferro Carril Oeste	34	12	8	14	60	74	−14	32
11	Argentinos Juniors	34	12	7	15	49	61	−12	31
12	Gimnasia y Esgrima (LP)	34	9	12	13	42	64	−22	30
13	Platense	34	13	3	18	52	52	0	29
14	Quilmes	34	12	5	17	53	62	−9	29
15	Talleres (RE)	34	11	2	21	48	68	−20	24
16	Tigre	34	8	7	19	47	70	−23	23
17	Lanús	34	10	2	22	43	82	−39	22
18	Atlanta	34	4	7	23	33	83	−50	15

=== Top goalscorers ===
Pos	Name	Team	Goals
1	(Argentina) Alberto Zozaya	Estudiantes (LP)	33
2	(Argentina) Alejandro Scopelli	Estudiantes (LP)	31
3	(Argentina) Francisco Varallo	Boca Juniors	27
