= 1931 in Argentine football =

Football in Argentina
- Season: 1931

1931 saw the creation of the "Liga Argentina de Football", by 18 breakaway members of the "Asociación Argentina de Football". The LAF was the first professional league in Argentine football, it was won by Boca Juniors. The Amateur championship continued in parallel: the eventual champions were Almagro.

== Liga Argentina de Football ==
=== Final standings ===
Position	Team	Points	Played	Won	Drawn	Lost	For	Against	Difference
1	Boca Juniors	50	34	22	6	6	85	49	36
2	San Lorenzo	45	34	19	7	8	81	52	29
3	Estudiantes La Plata	44	34	20	4	10	103	51	52
4	River Plate	44	34	19	6	9	63	39	24
5	Racing Club	43	34	19	5	10	81	51	30
6	Independiente	43	34	18	7	9	69	60	9
7	Chacarita Juniors	42	34	18	6	10	63	58	5
8	Huracán	33	34	13	7	14	58	49	9
9	Vélez Sársfield	33	34	13	7	14	63	68	-5
10	Ferro Carril Oeste	32	34	12	8	14	60	74	-14
11	Argentinos Juniors	31	34	12	7	15	49	61	-12
12	Gimnasia La Plata	30	34	9	12	13	42	64	-22
13	Platense	29	34	13	3	18	52	52	0
14	Quilmes	29	34	12	5	17	53	62	-9
15	Talleres (RdE)	24	34	11	2	21	48	68	-20
16	Tigre	23	34	8	7	19	47	70	-23
17	Lanús	22	34	10	2	22	43	84	-39
18	Atlanta	15	34	4	7	23	33	83	-50

=== Top Scorers ===
Position	Player	Team	Goals
1	Alberto Zozaya	Estudiantes La Plata	33
2	Alejandro Scopelli	Estudiantes La Plata	31
3	Francisco Varallo	Boca Juniors	27
4	Herminio Masantonio	Huracán	23
5	Luis Sánchez	Platense	20

=== Relegation ===
No teams were relegated after the inaugural season.
