= 1937 São Paulo FC season =

São Paulo
1937 season
- Chairman: Frederico Antônio Germano Menzen; Cid Matos Viana
- Manager: Armando Del Debbio; Vicente Feola
- Campeonato Paulista: 7th
- Top goalscorer: League: Sidnei (2); All: Milani (13)

The 1937 football season was São Paulo's 8th season since the club's founding in 1930.

== Statistics ==
=== Scorers ===
Position	Nation	Playing position	Name	Campeonato Paulista	Others	Total
1	(Brazil)		Milani	0	13	13
2	(Brazil)		Ministrinho	0	8	8
3	(Brazil)		Carioca	1	5	6
4	(Brazil)		Junqueirinha	1	3	4
=	(Brazil)		Pixe	1	3	4
5	(Brazil)		Aurélio	1	1	2
=	(Brazil)		Chemp	0	2	2
=	(Brazil)		Sidnei	2	0	2
=	(Brazil)		Tino	1	1	2
6	(Brazil)		Barbosa	0	1	1
=	(Brazil)		Douglas	0	1	1
=	(Brazil)		Xaxá	1	0	1
			Own Goals	0	1	1
			Total	8	43	51

== Overall ==
Games played	31 (9 Campeonato Paulista, 22 Friendly match)
Games won	12 (4 Campeonato Paulista, 8 Friendly match)
Games drawn	1 (0 Campeonato Paulista, 1 Friendly match)
Games lost	18 (5 Campeonato Paulista, 13 Friendly match)
Goals scored	51
Goals conceded	51
Goal difference	0
Best result	7–0 (A) v Ypiranga-BA - Campeonato Paulista - 1937.11.18
Worst result	1–4 (A) v Galícia - Friendly match - 1937.11.21; 1–4 (A) v Santos - Campeonato Paulista - 1937.09.12
Most appearances	
Top scorer	Milani (13)

Source: São Paulo FC

== Friendlies ==
January 25 National	São Paulo	3–1	Ponte Preta	São Paulo
	Chemp 52'; Gustavo 64' (o.g.); Barbosa		Barriga 25'	Stadium: Estádio Antônio Alonso (Antarctica Paulista); Referee: José Maestre

February 6 National	Estudantes	4–2	São Paulo	São Paulo
	Chiquinho 18'; Novo 20'; Leme 60'; Milton 74'		Chemp 35'; Tino 51'	Stadium: Estádio Antônio Alonso (Antarctica Paulista); Referee: Arthur Cidrin

February 20 National	Santos	3–1	São Paulo	Santos
	Moran; Araken; Marçal		Ministrinho	Stadium: Estádio Urbano Caldeira (Vila Belmiro); Referee: Antônio de Mendonça

April 11 National	Guarani	2–1	São Paulo	Campinas
	Odilon 16'; Delovitz		Aurélio 55'	Referee: Jorge Miguel

May 8 National	São Paulo	1–2	Guarani	São Paulo
	Junqueirinha		Felipelli 89' (o.g.)	Stadium: Estádio Palestra Itália (Parque Antarctica); Referee: Edgar Marques

July 4 Taça da Paz	Guarany (Catanduva)	1–0	São Paulo	Catanduva
	Barcelona			Referee: Vitor Ferreira

September 26 National	Corinthians	1–1	São Paulo	São Paulo
	Teleco 65'		Ministrinho 77'	Stadium: Estádio Alfredo Schürig (Parque São Jorge); Referee: Antônio Janeiro

October 10 National	Atlético Paranaense	1–2	São Paulo	Curitiba
	Cecato		Milani,	Referee: Athayde Santos

October 12 National	Ferroviário	2–1	São Paulo	Curitiba
	Goal		Milani

October National	Atlético Paranaense	2–1	São Paulo	Curitiba
	Goal		Goal

October 30 National	São Paulo	1–0	Portuguesa	São Paulo
	Carioca			Stadium: Estádio Palestra Itália (Parque Antarctica); Referee: Silva Marques

November 6 National	Ypiranga-SP	2–1	São Paulo	São Paulo
	Lalá,		Carioca	Stadium: Estádio Palestra Itália (Parque Antarctica); Referee: Silvio Stucchi

November 6 National	Portuguesa	1–3	São Paulo	São Paulo
	Goal		Goal	Stadium: Estádio Paulo Machado de Carvalho (Pacaembu)

November 15 National	Bahia	5–4	São Paulo	Salvador
	Romeu,, Amorim; Timas		Ministrinho; Pixe, Carioca	Stadium: Campo da Graça; Referee: Dante Silva

November 18 Taça Ypiranga	Ypiranga-BA	0–7	São Paulo	Salvador
			Milani, Carioca, Ministrinho; Pixe; Junqueirinha	Stadium: Campo da Graça; Referee: Dante Silva

November 21 National	Galícia	4–1	São Paulo	Salvador
	Bermudes 16', 72'; Palito 69', 75'		Douglas 64'	Stadium: Campo da Graça; Referee: Dante Silva

November 25 National	Botafogo-BA	2–0	São Paulo	Salvador
	Henrique 48'; Ignácio 77'			Stadium: Campo da Graça; Attendance: Dante Silva; Referee: Arivaldo Ulm

November 28 National	Galícia	4–3	São Paulo	Salvador
	Moela 29'; Servílio 35', Palito 74'		Milani 44'; Junqueirinha 57'; Ministrinho 66'	Stadium: Campo da Graça; Referee: Dante Silva

December 2 National	Náutico	1–0	São Paulo	Recife
	Celso 27'			Stadium: Campo da Jaqueira; Referee: José Fernandes

December 5 National	Tramways	0–3	São Paulo	Recife
			Ministrinho 15', 44'; Milani 37'	Stadium: Campo da Jaqueira; Referee: João Chiavonni

December 8 National	Sport	1–4	São Paulo	Recife
	Fernando		Milani 8', 32', Ministrinho	Stadium: Campo da Jaqueira; Referee: Sherlock

December 12 Taça Hotel Avenida	Santa Cruz	1–3	São Paulo	Recife
	Zé Pequeno 60'		Milani 22', 90', 90+2'	Stadium: Campo da Jaqueira; Referee: João Chiavonni

== Official competitions ==
=== Campeonato Paulista ===
June 20 1	São Paulo	3–1	São Paulo Railway	São Paulo
	Sidnei; Xaxá; Aurélio		Agostinho	Stadium: Estádio Palestra Itália (Parque Antarctica); Referee: Arthur Cidrin

July 11 2	Portuguesa Santista	1–0	São Paulo	Santos
	Logu			Stadium: Estádio Ulrico Mursa; Referee: Edgard Marques

July 18 3	Espanha	1–2	São Paulo	Santos
	Bicudo 11'		Sidnei 25'; Carioca 71'	Stadium: Vila Macuco; Referee: Heitor Domingues

July 25 4	Palestra Itália	1–0	São Paulo	São Paulo
	Machina 8'			Stadium: Estádio Palestra Itália (Parque Antarctica); Referee: Edgard Marques

August 8 5	Luzitano	0–1	São Paulo	São Paulo
			Pixe 58'	Stadium: Campo da Rua São Jorge; Referee: Edgard Marques

August 15 6	Estudantes	0–1	São Paulo	São Paulo
			Tino 23'	Stadium: Estádio Antônio Alonso (Antarctica Paulista); Referee: Heitor Domingues

August 29 7	Corinthians	1–0	São Paulo	São Paulo
	Carlito 47'			Stadium: Estádio Alfredo Schürig (Parque São Jorge); Referee: Atílio Grimaldi

September 5 8	Juventus	2–0	São Paulo	São Paulo
	Aníbal (o.g.); Zalli			Stadium: Estádio Rua Javari (Rua Javari); Referee: Edgard Marques

September 12 9	Santos	4–1	São Paulo	Santos
	Sacy; Otávio 28'; Neves 55'; Gradim 61'		Junqueirinha 71'	Stadium: Estádio Urbano Caldeira (Vila Belmiro); Referee: Demóstenes

Final Position	Points	Matches	Wins	Draws	Losses	Goals For	Goals Away	Win%
7th	8	9	4	0	5	8	11	44%
