= Enrique García (Argentine footballer) =

Argentine footballer

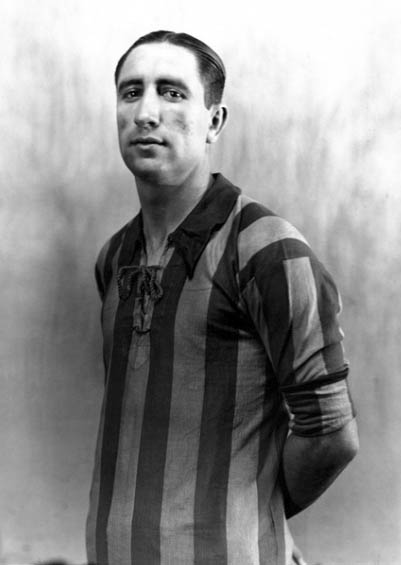
- García with Rosario Central shirt in 1935

Personal information
- Date of birth: November 20, 1912
- Place of birth: Santa Fe, Argentina
- Date of death: 23 August 1969 (Aged 56)
- Position: Left winger

Youth career
- Las Rosas

Senior career*
Years	Team	Apps	(Gls)
1931–1933	Gimnasia y Esgrima (SF)	86	(19)
1933–1936	Rosario Central	98	(33)
1936–1944	Racing Club	233	(78)

International career
1935–1943	Argentina	35	(9)
- * Club domestic league appearances and goals as of October 2008

Enrique García (20 November 1912 – 23 August 1969) was an Argentine footballer. Nicknamed Chueco, or El Poeta de la Zurda ("the poet of the left leg", due to his skills for football), is regarded as the best Argentine left winger ever.

Garcia soon moved to Rosario Central, CA, where he earned a national reputation for his skills. Argentine big teams tried to recruit Garcia like this . CA Independiente continued to try to make Garcia a player of their own, but Rosario could not meet the transfer conditions and withdrew, and the final winner of the match for Garcia was Aveaneda Classico of Independiente . rival It was a racing club . He scored 33 goals in 98 appearances for Rosario Central.

García had a long tenure in Racing Club de Avellaneda, where he played 234 matches in 9 years of career with the club, although the team did not win any title. Due to his extraordinary dribbling ability, García became an idol of Racing Club, being acclaimed even by his rivals. He also had a successful run on the Argentina national team, winning the Copa América on two occasions. Out of García's 78 goals scored in his career, only two were scored with his right leg.

== Biography ==
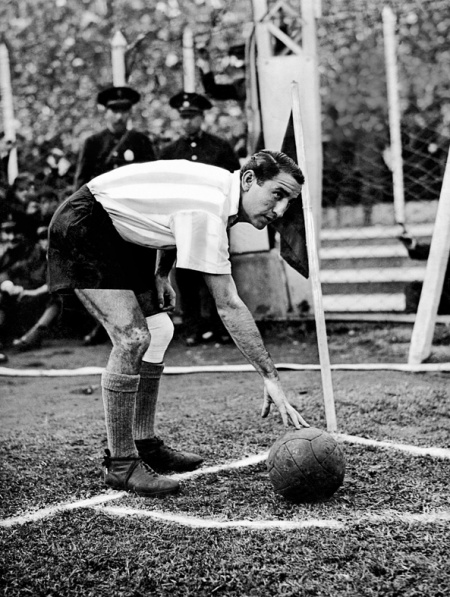
Garcìa about to take a corner kick playing for Racing, in 1940

García was born on 20 November 1912 in the city of Santa Fe. He started playing football at local Club Las Rosas. His brother Salvador played in the Unión de Santa Fe reserve team and brought him to the club for a try, but he was not chosen. In 1929 García moved to Club Brown, where he debuted v Unión, scoring the only goal for a 1–0 win. In 1932, Gimnasia y Esgrima hired García (who was 19 yo) for m$n 2,500.

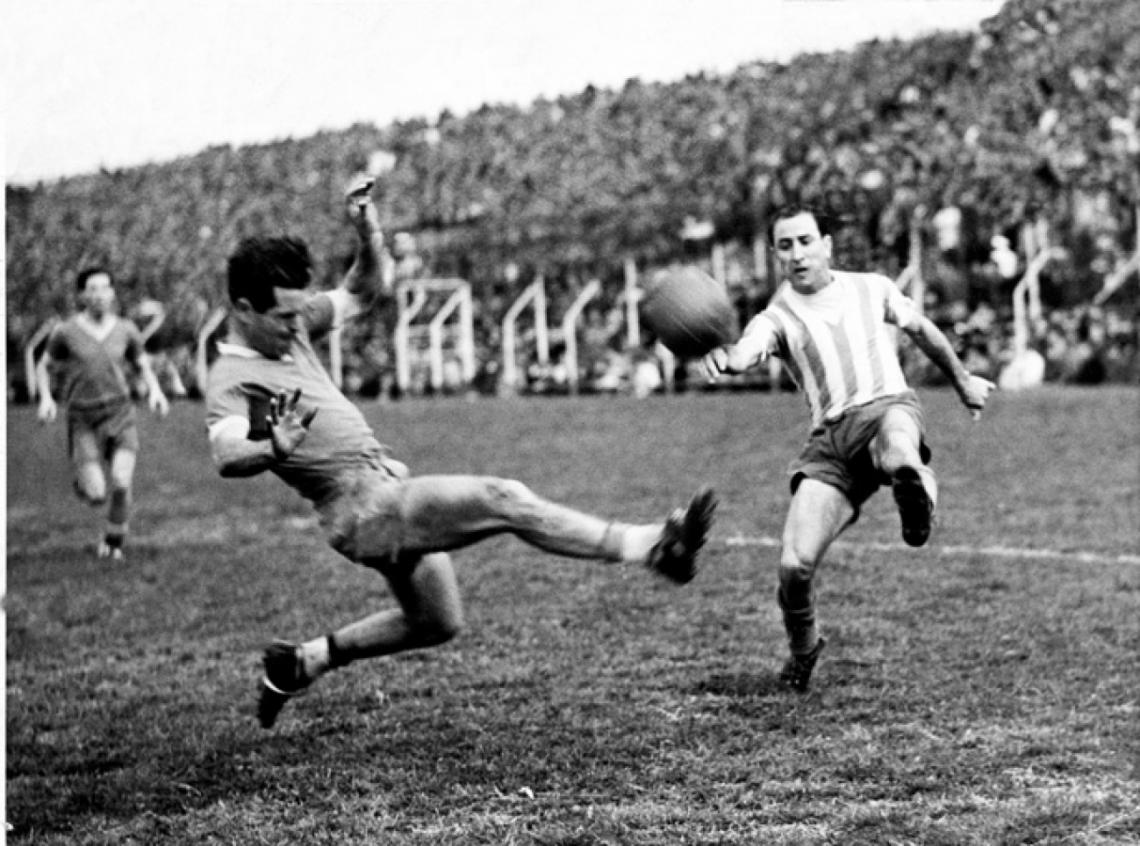
García playing v Independiente in 1942

In Gimnasia, García won the Santa Fe regional championship, being part of a forward line nicknamed los pistoleros ("the gunmen") due to their high goal average. A journalist of El Litoral (local newspaper) nicknamed him "Chueco", which would be his most famous moniker. One year later, García was traded to Rosario Central for $5,000. The Rosarian team was still playing in regional tournaments, but García became an idol of the club and gained recognition not only in the city but in the whole country. García played near 100 matches with Rosario Central. It was said that Ernesto "Che" Guevara became a fan of Rosario Central after being impressed by García's style of play. Writer Osvaldo Bayer was also an admirer of García.

In spite of the interest from Independiente to bring García to the club, arch rival Racing was the club which signed García in 1936 for $39.000 and all the profits from a friendly match between both clubs. Apart from García, Racing hired Alejandro Scopelli and Enrique Guaita and goalkeeper Angel Capuano (all of them, returning from Italy). García made his debut for a porteño team in May 1936. He played 232 consecutive matches for Racing Club, being named "the poet of the left leg" by the press. His best season was in 1938, when he scored 20 goals in 32 matches.

In September 1943 García's left received a serious meniscus injury in a match v Boca Juniors, and underwent surgery. He never recovered completely causing that two years later García left football. He had played 234 matches with 78 goals scored for Racing Club.

== National team ==
García played 35 times for Argentina between 1935 (when he was playing for Rosario Central) and 1943, scoring 9 goals. He was part of the Copa América winning squads of 1937 (where he was one of the keyplayers of the team due to his goals and assistances) and 1941, he also played in the 1942 edition of the tournament. Unfortunately the peak of his career coincided with World War II denying him the chance to play in a FIFA World Cup.

== Post-football career ==
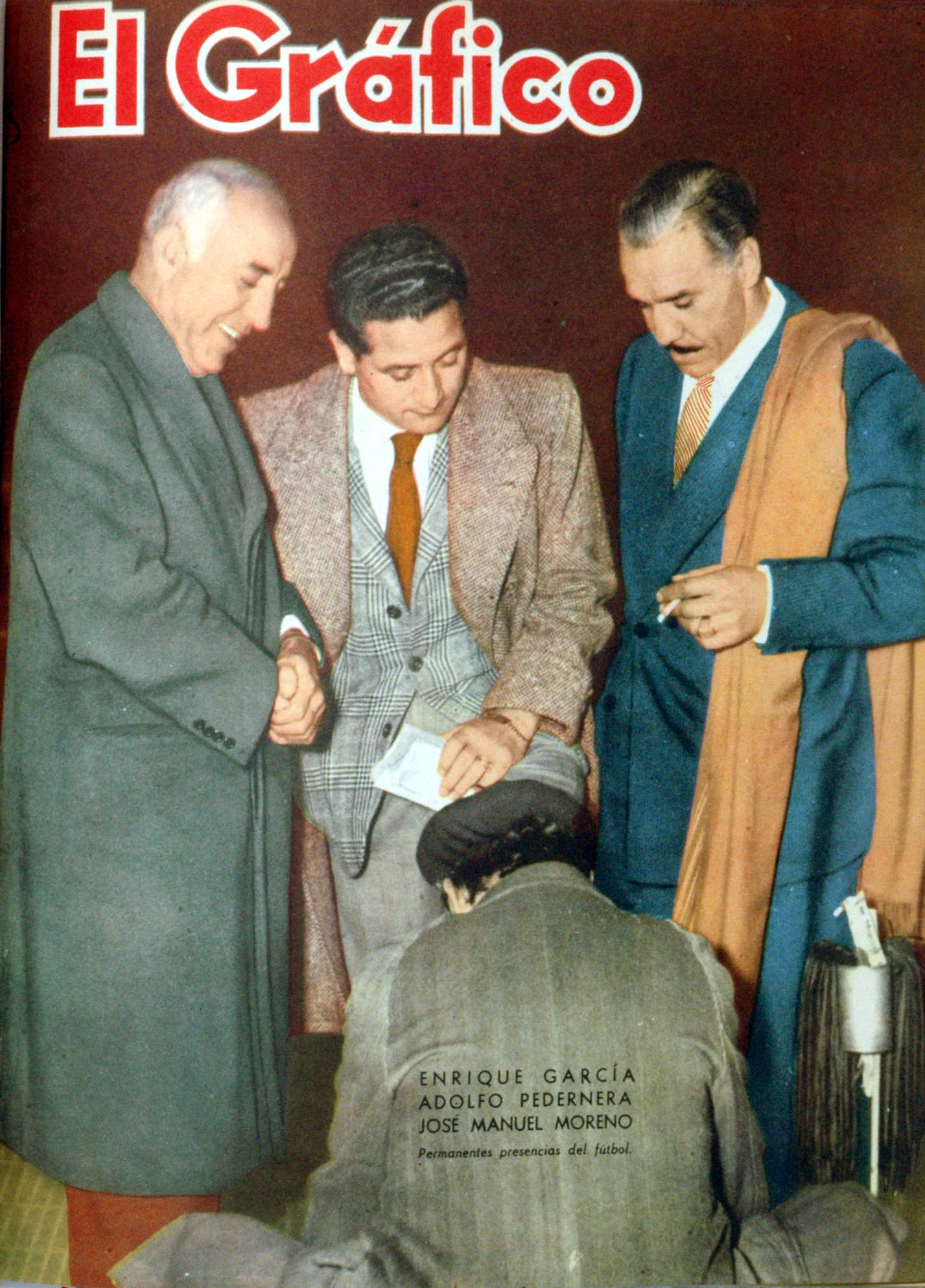
García (left) with Adolfo Pedernera and José Manuel Moreno on the cover of El Gráfico, 1957

When his professional career ended, García worked at his own sweet shop until 1960, when he returned to football as talent scout and trainer of the youth divisions at Racing Club. "We do not want players to be created overnight. Footballers cannot escape the human law of evolution", said García by then.

During his last years, García was in a situation of poverty and used to go from bar to bar, saying to customers "I am Enrique García, the best left winger of all times, would you invite me to have a coffee?"

García died on August 23, 1969. He was only 56 years old.

== Quotes ==
=== In his own words ===
Marking has been invented by the coaches. I am an enemy of all tactic systems. They fight against the beauty of football. There is no beauty or improvisation with them. Everything is subject to discipline and orders. The best players disappear from the game with that duty. Because of that, I think that systems are only useful for people with no natural conditions. They go to the field to don't let their rivals play, but neither do they.

— García about modern tactic systems in football

If I had tried to learn how to play with both legs, do you think I would have been so skillful with the left one?

— García soon after his retirement from football.

=== People about García ===
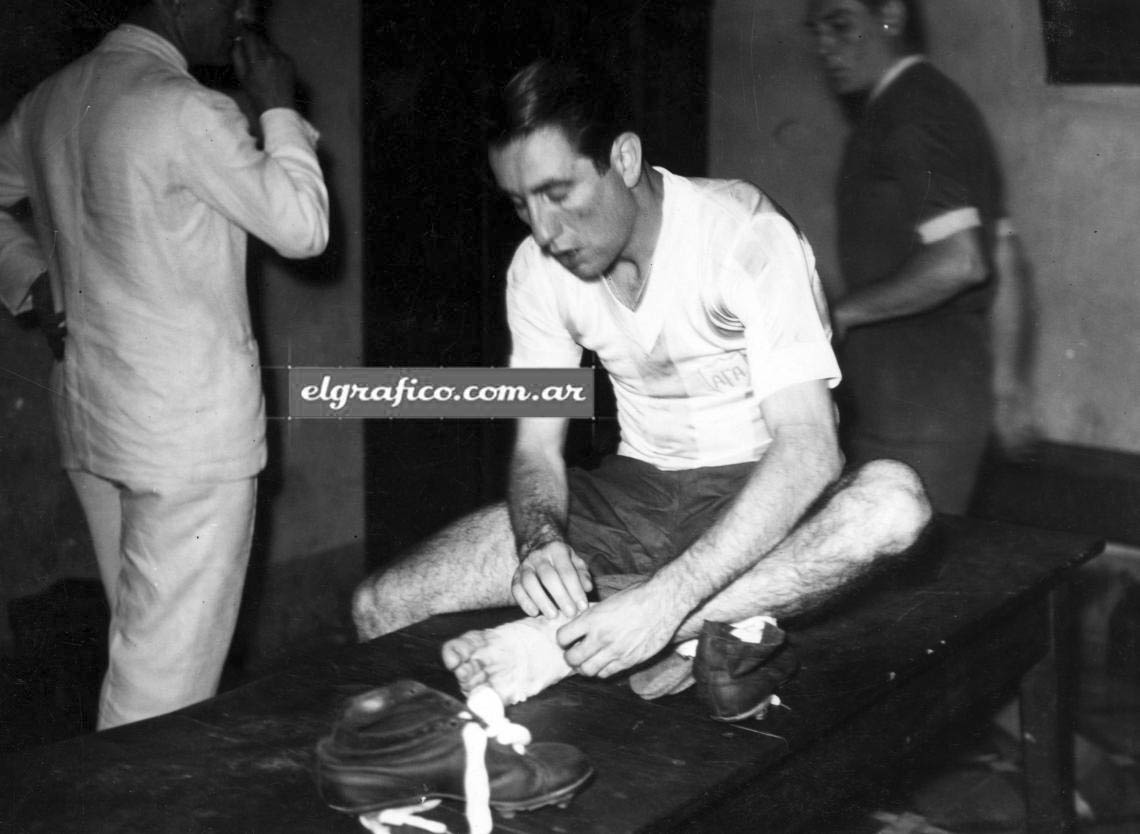
García with the Argentina national team before to play the Copa América Final v Brazil, 1 February 1937

El Fenómeno was all the wingers in one. He is different. He has the best of each one of them. Goes along the corner, then inside the area, he shots, plays, dances, blends, softens, shrinks the ball... and everything with just one leg. The other one is a stick. And he does not need anything else. A crutche at his right, and that left leg that worths both. That leg knits, sews, and makes verses"

— Article about García published on El Gráfico #1090, May 1940

He was the greatest left winger in the history. Maybe Félix Loustau was better for the team, but the Chueco was better for the position on field.

— Dante Panzeri

He was extraordinary, a glory, "the Gardel of football". He was the player who invented a play that many tried to make after him: throwing a pass to the middle while running. He scored in an unusual way, placing the ball between the goalkeeper and the post.

— Racing left winger Ezra Sued, which succeeded García in 1943.

If the dirty face of football claimed for someone who represented him, so Enrique García, the poet of the left leg, was the man. He was naughty, mocky, ironic, despective, almost cruel to rivals, joking, angel and demon, admired by some and hated by others. His plays were all genius and his attitudes were purely defiant.

— Uruguayan sports journalist Diego Lucero analyzing García's style of play and conduct on the field

== Honours ==
Argentina

- Copa América: 1937, 1941
