= Golden Foot =

Association football award

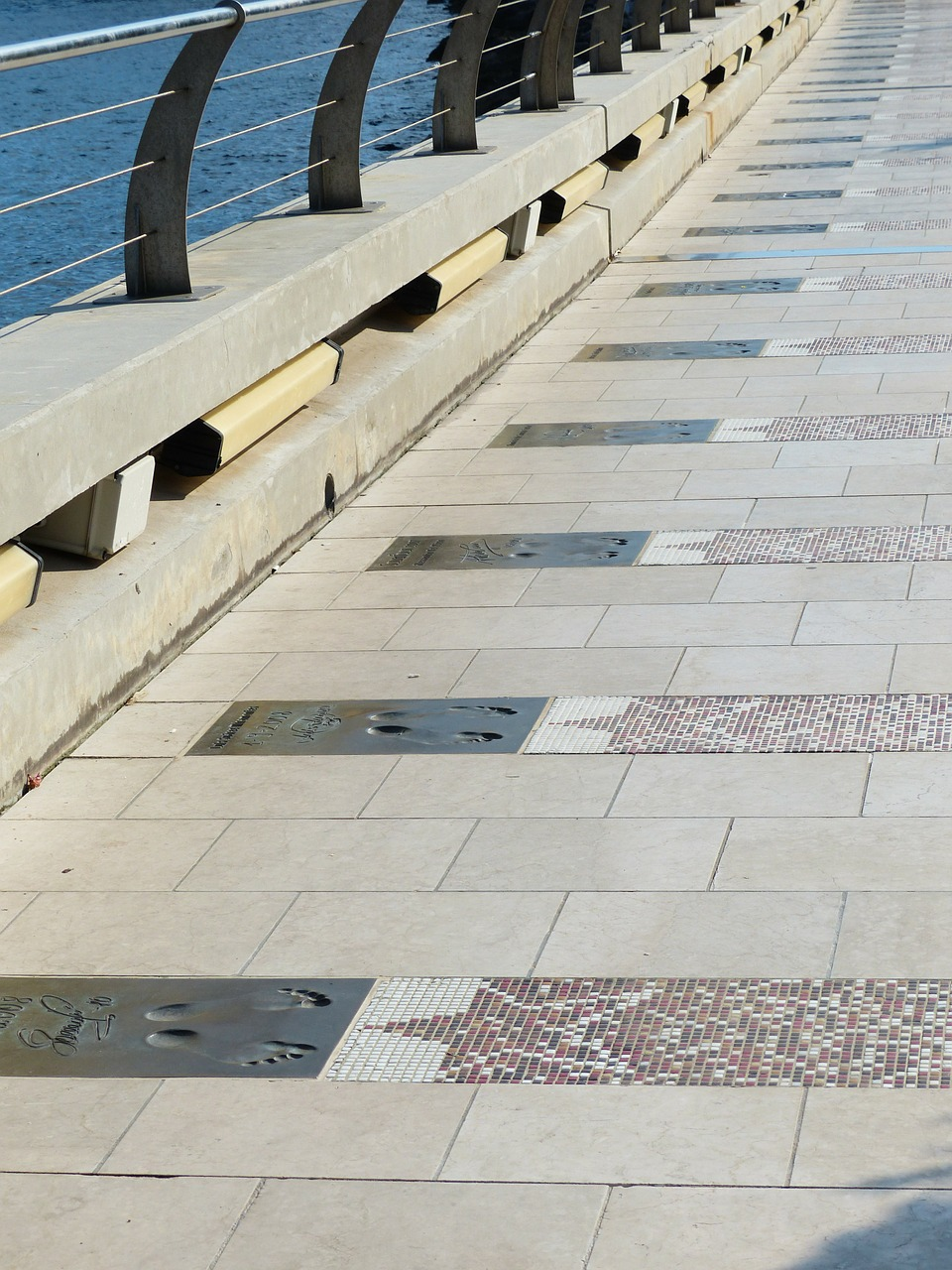
- The Champions Promenade, on the seafront of the Principality of Monaco
- Location: Hôtel de Paris Monte-Carlo
- Country: Monaco
- Presented by: Monarchy of Monaco
- First award: 2003
- Currently held by: (France) Antoine Griezmann (men's, 2025) (Denmark) Nadia Nadim (women's, 2025)
- Website: goldenfoot.com

The Golden Foot award is an international football award, given to players who stand out for their athletic achievements (both as individuals and team players) and for their personality. The award is only given to active players of at least 27 years of age, and can only be won once.

Ten nominees are chosen by a panel of international journalists based on the criteria that they are at least 27 years of age and still playing. Out of this list, and until 2022, the winner was selected by an online poll, where anyone could vote. From 2024, the winner is selected by a committee of professionals chaired by Antonio Caliendo, the founder of the award. The winner of the award leaves a permanent mould of his footprints on "The Champions Promenade", on the seafront of the Principality of Monaco.

Since 2009, there has been a charity auction accompanying the Golden Foot event. The auction is held during the gala evening at the Hôtel de Paris Monte-Carlo, and raises funds for fighting AIDS.

== Award winners ==
List of Golden Foot award winners
Year	Player	Club	Birth year	Award age
2003	(Italy) Roberto Baggio	(Italy) Brescia	1967	36
2004	(Czech Republic) Pavel Nedvěd	(Italy) Juventus	1972	32
2005	(Ukraine) Andriy Shevchenko	(Italy) Milan	1976	29
2006	(Brazil) Ronaldo	(Spain) Real Madrid	1976	30
2007	(Italy) Alessandro Del Piero	(Italy) Juventus	1974	33
2008	(Brazil) Roberto Carlos	(Turkey) Fenerbahçe	1973	35
2009	(Brazil) Ronaldinho	(Italy) Milan	1980	29
2010	(Italy) Francesco Totti	(Italy) Roma	1976	34
2011	(Wales) Ryan Giggs	(England) Manchester United	1973	38
2012	(Sweden) Zlatan Ibrahimović	(France) Paris Saint-Germain	1981	31
2013	(Ivory Coast) Didier Drogba	(Turkey) Galatasaray	1978	35
2014	(Spain) Andrés Iniesta	(Spain) Barcelona	1984	30
2015	(Cameroon) Samuel Eto'o	(Turkey) Antalyaspor	1981	34
2016	(Italy) Gianluigi Buffon	(Italy) Juventus	1978	38
2017	(Spain) Iker Casillas	(Portugal) Porto	1981	36
2018	(Uruguay) Edinson Cavani	(France) Paris Saint-Germain	1987	31
2019	(Croatia) Luka Modrić	(Spain) Real Madrid	1985	34
2020	(Portugal) Cristiano Ronaldo	(Italy) Juventus	1985	35
2021	(Egypt) Mohamed Salah	(England) Liverpool	1992	29
2022	(Poland) Robert Lewandowski	(Spain) Barcelona	1988	34
2024	(Argentina) Lautaro Martínez	(Italy) Inter Milan	1997	27
2025	(France) Antoine Griezmann	(Spain) Atlético Madrid	1991	34

=== By country ===
Country	Players
Italy	4
Brazil	3
Spain	2
Portugal	1
Croatia	1
Egypt	1
Czech Republic	1
Ukraine	1
Wales	1
Sweden	1
Ivory Coast	1
Cameroon	1
Uruguay	1
Poland	1
Argentina	1
France	1

=== By club ===
Club	Players
(Italy) Juventus	4
(Italy) Milan	2
(France) Paris Saint-Germain	2
(Spain) Real Madrid	2
(Spain) Barcelona	2
(Italy) Brescia	1
(Turkey) Antalyaspor	1
(Turkey) Fenerbahçe	1
(Turkey) Galatasaray	1
(England) Manchester United	1
(Italy) Roma	1
(Portugal) Porto	1
(England) Liverpool	1
(Italy) Inter Milan	1
(Spain) Atlético Madrid	1

== Women's Golden Foot ==
An equivalent award for women's football was assigned from 2022 onwards.

List of Women's Golden Foot award winners
Year	Player	Club	Birth year	Award age
2022	(Sweden) Kosovare Asllani	(Italy) Milan	1989	33
2024	(Japan) Saki Kumagai	(Italy) Roma	1990	34
2025	(Denmark) Nadia Nadim	(Sweden) Hammarby	1988	37

== Award legends ==
List of Golden Foot award legends
Year	Legends
2003	(Argentina) Diego Maradona
2003	(Portugal) Eusébio
2003	(Italy) Gianni Rivera
2003	(France) Just Fontaine
2004	(Argentina) Alfredo Di Stéfano
2004	(Italy) Dino Zoff
2004	(France) Michel Platini
2005	(Spain) Paco Gento
2005	(Northern Ireland) George Best
2005	(Liberia) George Weah
2005	(Italy) Gigi Riva
2005	(Brazil) Rivellino
2006	(Uruguay) Alcides Ghiggia
2006	(Hungary) Ferenc Puskás
2006	(Italy) Giacinto Facchetti
2006	(France) Raymond Kopa
2006	(Brazil) Zico
2007	(Germany) Gerd Müller
2007	(Bulgaria) Hristo Stoichkov
2007	(Argentina) Mario Kempes
2007	(Italy) Paolo Rossi
2007	(Brazil) Romário
2008	(Brazil) Aldair
2008	(Ukraine) Igor Belanov
2008	(Spain) Luis Suárez
2008	(France) Zinedine Zidane
2009	(Germany) Karl-Heinz Rummenigge
2009	(Brazil) Nilton Santos
2009	(Ukraine) Oleg Blokhin
2009	(Colombia) René Higuita
2009	(Poland) Zbigniew Boniek
2010	(Brazil) Carlos Dunga
2010	(Argentina) Francisco Varallo
2010	(Germany) Franz Beckenbauer
2010	(Italy) Giancarlo Antognoni
2010	(Mexico) Hugo Sánchez
2011	(Ghana) Abedi Pele
2011	(Argentina) Javier Zanetti
2011	(Portugal) Luís Figo
2011	(Algeria) Rabah Madjer
2011	(Netherlands) Ruud Gullit
2012	(France) Eric Cantona
2012	(Italy) Franco Baresi
2012	(Germany) Lothar Matthäus
2012	(Brazil) Pelé
2013	(Colombia) Carlos Valderrama
2013	(France) Jean-Pierre Papin
2013	(Argentina) Osvaldo Ardiles
2014	(Czech Republic) Antonín Panenka
2014	(Belgium) Jean-Marie Pfaff
2014	(Turkey) Hakan Şükür
2014	(Japan) Hidetoshi Nakata
2014	(United States) Mia Hamm
2014	(Cameroon) Roger Milla
2015	(Romania) Gheorghe Hagi
2015	(Argentina) Daniel Passarella
2015	(France) David Trezeguet
2015	(Russia) Rinat Dasayev
2016	(Netherlands) Frank de Boer
2016	(Italy) Claudio Ranieri
2016	(Spain) Carles Puyol
2016	(Portugal) Deco
2017	(Italy) Roberto Mancini
2017	(England) Michael Owen
2017	(France) Marcel Desailly
2017	(Germany) Oliver Kahn
2017	(China) Li Ming
2018	(Brazil) Leonardo Araújo
2018	(Netherlands) Clarence Seedorf
2018	(Italy) Andrea Pirlo
2018	(Italy) Marcello Lippi
2018	(France) Didier Deschamps
2019	(Brazil) Paulo Roberto Falcao
2019	(France) Patrick Vieira
2019	(Brazil) José Altafini
2019	(Italy) Carolina Morace
2021	(Brazil) Dani Alves
2021	(Italy) Paolo Maldini
2021	(Germany) Günter Netzer
2021	(Italy) Gabriele Oriali
2021	(England) Kelly Smith
2022	(Spain) Emilio Butragueño
2022	(Argentina) Juan Sebastián Verón
2022	(Turkey) Fatih Terim
2024	(Italy) Fabio Cannavaro
2024	(Spain) Gerard Piqué
2024	(Portugal) Rui Costa
2024	(Spain) Fernando Llorente
2024	(Netherlands) Ruud Krol
2025	(France) Alain Boghossian
2025	(France) Christian Karembeu
2025	(Argentina) Diego Simeone

=== Total by country ===
Country	Total
Italy	15
Brazil	11
France	12
Argentina	9
Germany	6
Spain	6
Netherlands	4
Portugal	4
Colombia	2
Sweden	2
Turkey	2
Ukraine	2
Algeria	1
Belgium	1
Bulgaria	1

Country	Total
Cameroon	1
China	1
Czech Republic	1
England	1
Ghana	1
Hungary	1
Japan	1
Liberia	1
Mexico	1
Northern Ireland	1
Poland	1
Romania	1
Russia	1
United States	1
Uruguay	1

== Golden Foot Prestige Award ==
A Prestige Award was given from 2020 onwards.

List of Golden Foot Prestige award
2020	(Italy) Andrea Agnelli
2021	(Italy) Gabriele Gravina
2022	(Spain) Florentino Pérez
