= Manuel Arancibia =

Chilean footballer (1908-1997)

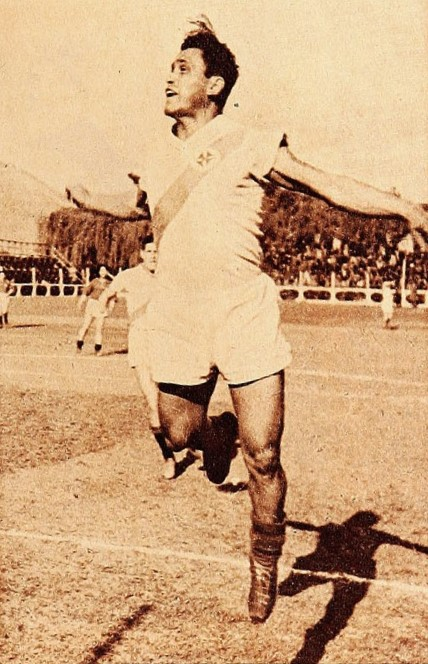
- Arancibia wearing the Green Cross shirt.

Personal information
- Date of birth: 25 May 1908
- Date of death: 27 March 1987 (aged 78)
- Position: Forward

International career
Years	Team	Apps	(Gls)
1937–1942	Chile	6	(3)

Manuel Arancibia (25 May 1908 – 27 March 1987) was a Chilean footballer. He played in six matches for the Chile national football team from 1937 to 1942. He was also part of Chile's squad for the 1937 South American Championship.
