= Eduardo Ithurbide =

Uruguayan footballer (born 1908)

Personal information
- Full name: Eduardo Pedro Ithurbide
- Date of birth: 10 March 1908
- Place of birth: Montevideo, Uruguay
- Position: Forward

Senior career*
Years	Team	Apps	(Gls)
1925–1931	Lito Montevideo		
1932	Montevideo Wanderers		
1933–1937	Nacional		
1937–1938	Sochaux		
1939–1941	Platense		

International career
1932–1937	Uruguay	7	(1)
1938	France B		
- * Club domestic league appearances and goals

Eduardo Pedro Ithurbide (10 March 1908 – unknown) was a Uruguayan footballer who played for the Uruguay national football team. He also represented the France national football B team in 1938.

== Career statistics ==
=== International ===
National team	Year	Apps	Goals
Uruguay	1932	2	0
Uruguay	1935	1	0
Uruguay	1936	1	0
Uruguay	1937	3	1
Total		7	1

=== International goals ===
Scores and results list Uruguay's goal tally first.

No	Date	Venue	Opponent	Score	Result	Competition
1.	23 January 1937	Estadio Gasómetro, Boedo, Buenos Aires, Argentina	Argentina	1–0	3–2	1937 South American Championship
