= Guillermo Torres (footballer) =

Chilean footballer (1909–1985)

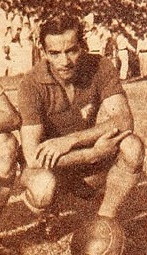

Personal information
- Full name: Guillermo Raúl Torres Felsmann
- Date of birth: 21 September 1909
- Place of birth: Santiago, Chile
- Date of death: 1985 (aged 75–76)
- Position: Forward

International career
Years	Team	Apps	(Gls)
1937–1942	Chile	9	(1)

Guillermo Torres (21 September 1909 – 1985) was a Chilean footballer. He played in nine matches for the Chile national football team from 1937 to 1942. He was also part of Chile's squad for the 1937 South American Championship.
