= Raúl Toro (footballer, born 1911) =

Chilean footballer

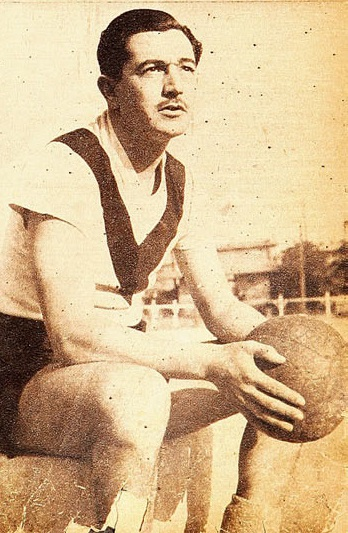
- Toro with Santiago Morning in 1942

Personal information
- Full name: Raúl Toro Julio
- Date of birth: 21 February 1911
- Place of birth: Copiapó, Chile
- Date of death: 30 October 1982 (aged 71)
- Place of death: Santiago, Chile
- Position: Centre forward

Youth career
- Lord Cochrane

Senior career*
Years	Team	Apps	(Gls)
1930	Lord Cochrane		
1931	Colo-Colo		
1932	Caja de Ahorros		
1933	Everton		
1933–1934	Santiago Wanderers		
1935	Deportes Santiago		
1935–1937	Santiago Wanderers		
1937–1943	Santiago Morning		
1944	Santiago National		
1945–1948	Santiago Wanderers		

International career
1936–1941	Chile	13	(12)
- * Club domestic league appearances and goals

Raúl Toro Julio (21 February 1911 – 30 October 1982) was a former Chilean international footballer who played as a forward. Several ex-footballers consider him the best player from the early history of football in Chile.

== International career ==
Toro was a successful attacker for the Chilean senior national team with 12 goals in 13 matches including appearances at two South American Championship (Copa América), and was the top scorer of the 1937 South American Championship. At the time of his retirement as international in 1941 he was Chile's top scorer before Guillermo Subiabre (who scored 10 times by 1930).
