= Francisco Varallo =

Argentine footballer (1910–2010)

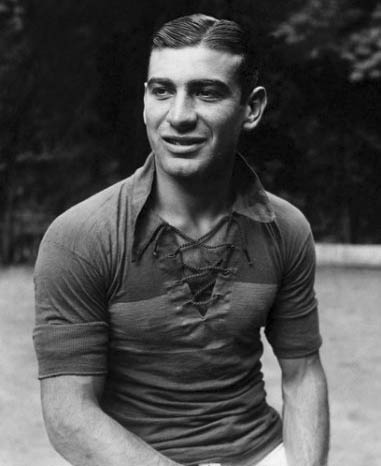
- Varallo in 1935

Personal information
- Full name: Francisco Antonio Varallo
- Date of birth: 5 February 1910
- Place of birth: La Plata, Argentina
- Date of death: 30 August 2010 (aged 100)
- Place of death: La Plata, Argentina
- Position: Inside right

Youth career
- 12 de Octubre
- Estudiantes LP
- Gimnasia y Esgrima LP

Senior career*
| Years | Team | Apps | (Gls) |
| 1928–1930 | Gimnasia y Esgrima LP | ? | (36) |
| 1930–1931 | → Vélez Sársfield (loan) (Note: He was only loaned for the Panamerican tour, with no official matches played.) | ? | (16) |
| 1931–1939 | Boca Juniors | 222 | (194) |

International career
| 1930–1937 | Argentina | 16 | (7) |

Managerial career
- 1957–1959: Gimnasia y Esgrima LP
Medal record
Men's Football
Representing Argentina
Copa América
| Winner | 1937 Argentina | Team |
FIFA World Cup
| Runner-up | 1930 Uruguay | Team |
- * Club domestic league appearances and goals

Francisco Antonio Varallo (Spanish pronunciation: [fɾanˈsisko anˈtonjo ˈpantʃo βaˈɾaʝo]; 5 February 1910 – 30 August 2010) was an Argentine footballer who played as a forward for the Argentina national team from 1930 to 1937, also representing the country at the inaugural FIFA World Cup in 1930.

During his career, Varallo won four Primera División titles (one with Gimnasia y Esgrima LP and three with Boca Juniors) and with 194 goals in 222 official matches, is Boca Juniors' 3rd. highest all-time leading goalscorer. Besides, Varallo is placed 11th. among the all-time Argentine Primera División top scorers with 216 goals.

Varallo died in his home-town of La Plata on 30 August 2010, aged 100. He was the last surviving player from the 1930 World Cup.

== Club career ==
=== Early years ===
Varallo was born in Los Hornos, a district of La Plata Partido in Buenos Aires Province, on 5 February 1910. He made his debut aged 14, and early in his career gained the nickname cañoncito (in English: "little cannon") for his shooting ability.

Aged 18, Varallo had a trial with Estudiantes de La Plata, scoring eleven goals in three games for the club. However, the board of the club where Varallo was a youth team player were supporters of Estudiantes' town rivals Gimnasia y Esgrima, and therefore denied him the opportunity to join Estudiantes. Varallo ultimately joined Gimnasia, making his debut for the club's reserve side, before making his debut for the first team in 1929. During his first season with Gimnasia, Varallo won the Primera División championship with the club after beating Boca Juniors by 2–1 in the final.

In 1930, the forward was loaned for free by Gimnasia to Vélez Sársfield to play for the team during their Pan-American tour. He totaled 17 goals during the tour.

=== Boca Juniors ===
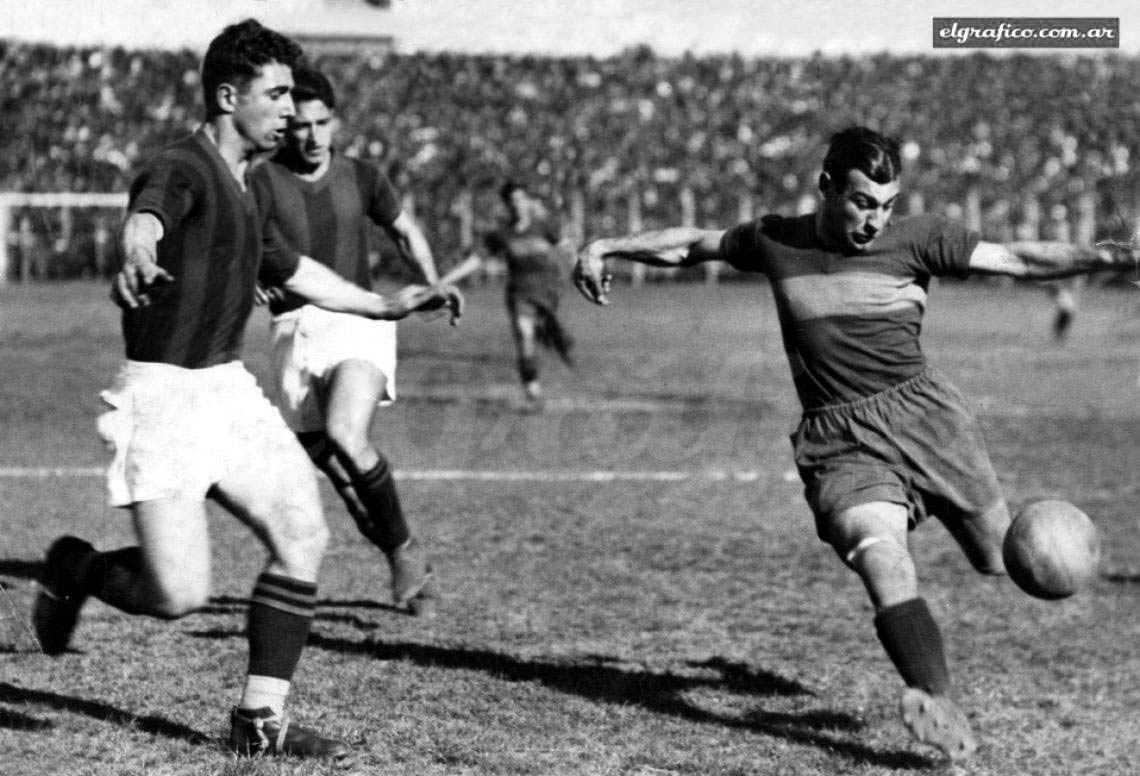
Varallo in action v San Lorenzo, c. 1935

Varallo moved to Boca Juniors for the start of the 1931 season (the first professional season in Argentina) for a fee of approximately $8000.

He continued to play for the club for the next nine years during which time he won the Primera División title three times, in 1931, 1934 and 1935, as well as coming runner up in 1933, when he was the top goalscorer in the league and of South America scoring 34 goals.

In his nine years at Boca Juniors he became the club's 2nd. top goal-scorer (after Roberto Cherro, although both would be surpassed by Martín Palermo in 2010), with 194 goals in 222 games (scoring average 0.87 per game), a record that stood until 2008 when it was broken by Martín Palermo.

During the 1930s Varallo formed strong partnerships with teammates Roberto Cherro and Delfín Benítez Cáceres, who both also scored over 100 goals for the club. In 1938, he was only able to play one game because of a bad knee injury and, although he played more frequently the next year, was forced to retire in 1940, aged 30.

== International career ==
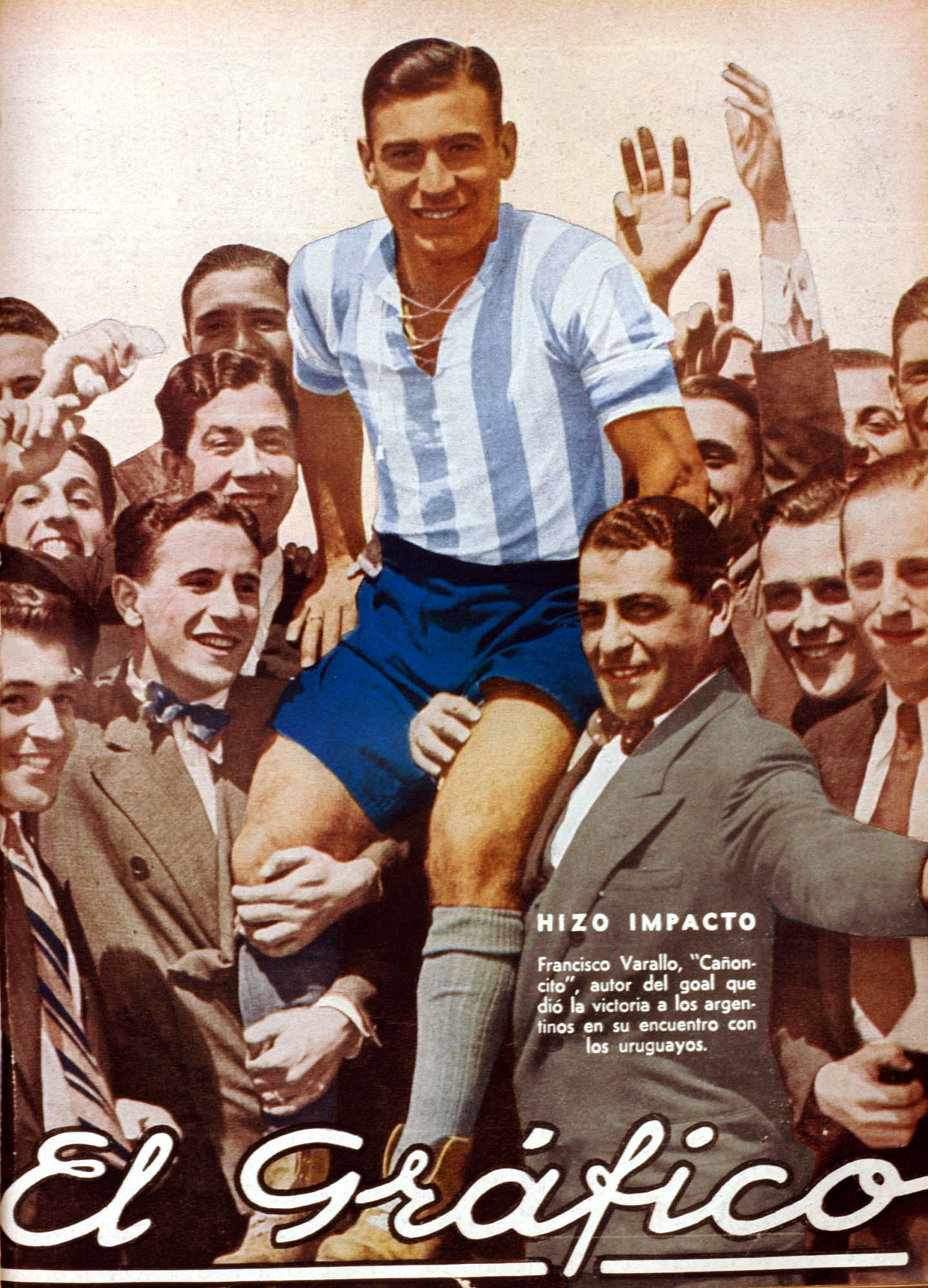
Varallo with the Argentina national team on a cover of El Gráfico magazine in 1933

Varallo represented Argentina at the inaugural World Cup in 1930, held in Uruguay, where he was the youngest player at age 20. He played in all three of the team's group games; scoring one goal in the match against Mexico, but missed the semi-final against the United States due to injury. However, he was fit to play in the World Cup final against Uruguay and started at inside right forward. Argentina were leading 2–1 at half time, but eventually lost to the hosts 4–2.

Varallo was also a member of the Argentine team that won the South American Championship in 1937. He scored three goals during the tournament, including a brace in the 2–1 win over Chile.

=== International goals ===
Argentina's goal tally first

| No. | Date | Opponent | Result | Venue | Competition |
|---|---|---|---|---|---|
| 1 | 25 May 1930 | Uruguay | 1–1 | Estadio Gasómetro | 1930 Copa Newton |
| 2 | 19 July 1930 | Mexico | 6–3 | Estadio Centenario | 1930 FIFA World Cup |
| 3 | 14 December 1933 | Uruguay | 1–0 | Estadio Centenario | Friendly |
| 4 | 30 December 1936 | Chile | 2–1 | Estadio Gasómetro | 1937 South American Championship |
| 4 | 23 January 1937 | Uruguay | 2–3 | Estadio Gasómetro | 1937 South American Championship |

== After retirement ==
Varallo retired from football in 1940, due to injury problems. Then he was coach of Gimnasia y Esgrima between 1957 and 1959. Varallo's career was recognised in 1994, when he was awarded with the FIFA Order of Merit for his contributions to football. He has also received honours from the Argentine Football Association and the South American Football Confederation.

In his late 90s Varallo had joked that he would have to come out of retirement should Martín Palermo overtake his record of 181 professional goals for Boca.

He marked his 100th birthday in February 2010 in his hometown near Buenos Aires by recalling the 1930 clash between his country and neighbouring Uruguay. In an interview he gave to FIFA to mark his birthday, he stated that losing in the final to Uruguay was his 'greatest disappointment'.

== Death ==
Varallo died on 30 August 2010, in his hometown of La Plata aged 100. Leading tributes to the former player, FIFA president Sepp Blatter stated that "The news that Francisco Varallo is no longer with us fills us with great sense of loss, both for his qualities as a person and an ambassador for our beloved sport ... In these grief-filled moments I can take immense pride from the fact that a character such as Francisco Varallo, whom we shall never forget, represented the football family with such dignity". The president of the South American Football Confederation Nicolás Léoz also released a statement expressing sadness at Varallo's death.

Following his death, both of his former clubs, Gimnasia and Boca announced a day of mourning, while the South American Football Confederation announced that a minute's silence was to be held during all Copa Sudamericana fixtures the following week.

== Honours ==
=== Club ===
Gimnasia y Esgrima (LP)

- Primera División (1): 1929

Boca Juniors

- Primera División (3): 1931, 1934, 1935

=== International ===
Argentina

- Copa América (1): 1937
- FIFA World Cup runner-up: 1930

=== Individual ===
- Primera División top scorer (1): 1933
- Golden Foot (1): 2010, as a football legend

=== Records ===
- Boca Juniors 3rd. highest all-time goalscorer: 194 goals
- Argentine Primera División 4th. all-time topscorer (236 goals)
- FIFA Order of Merit 1994
- CONMEBOL Order of Merit 2006
- The last surviving player from the 1930 World Cup

== See also ==
- List of centenarians (sportspeople)
