= Juan Píriz =

Uruguayan football player (1902-1946)

Personal information
- Date of birth: 17 May 1902
- Place of birth: Montevideo, Uruguay
- Date of death: 23 March 1946 (aged 43)
- Position: Centre midfielder

Senior career*
Years	Team	Apps	(Gls)
- Peñarol
- Defensor Sporting
- Nacional

International career
1928	Uruguay	2	(0)
Medal record
Men's football
Representing Uruguay
Olympic Games
Gold medal – first place	1928 Amsterdam	Team
- * Club domestic league appearances and goals

Juan Píriz (17 May 1902 – 23 March 1946) was a Uruguayan footballer who played as a defender. He was part of the Uruguayan team which won gold medal at 1928 Olympics.
