= Pavel Makarov =

Footballer (1919–1963)

Personal information
- Full name: Pavel Kapitonovic Makarov
- Date of birth: 26 January 1919
- Place of birth: Rostov-on-Don, Russian SFSR
- Date of death: 1963 (aged 44)
- Place of death: France
- Height: 1.73 m (5 ft 8 in)
- Position: Midfielder

Senior career*
Years	Team	Apps	(Gls)
1936–1940	Dynamo Rostov-on-Don	51	(14)
1940–1941	Dynamo Kharkiv	9	(4)
1941	Spartak Leningrad	8	(3)
1945	SK Ukraine Salzburg		
1945–1946	Ukraina Ulm		
1946	Stuttgarter Kickers	5	(2)
1947	Phönix Karlsruhe	18	(1)
1947	Berkut Ulm		
1947–1948	SSV Ulm	9	(3)
1948–1949	Chelmsford City	4	(3)
1949–1951	Nîmes	32	(3)
1951–1954	Grenoble	11	(0)
1954–1955	Toronto Ukrainians		
1955–1956	USM Montargis		
1956–1957	US Viesly		
1960–1961	FC Vauverdois		

Managerial career
- 1957–1962: US Viesly
- * Club domestic league appearances and goals

Pavel Kapitonovic Makarov (Russian: Павел Капитонович Макаров; 26 January 1919 — 1963) was a footballer who played as a midfielder in the Soviet Union, Austria, Germany, England, France and Canada.

== Career ==
Makarov began his career in 1936, playing for Soviet club Dynamo Rostov-on-Don. In his first two seasons at the club, Makarov helped the club gain promotion from the Soviet Second League and the Soviet First League. Makarov made 22 league appearances for Dynamo Rostov-on-Don, scoring four times, in the 1938 Soviet Top League season as the club finished 18th and were relegated back to the First League. In 1940, Makarov signed for Dynamo Kharkiv, before joining Spartak Leningrad.

In World War II, Makarov joined the Soviet 285th Rifle Division, before being captured by the Germans where he worked voluntarily in the Sonderkommandos. As the war finished, Makarov played for Austrian club SK Ukraine Salzburg.

Following the culmination of World War II, Makarov joined German clubs Stuttgarter Kickers and Phönix Karlsruhe. Makarov played 18 times, scoring once, in the Oberliga Süd for Phönix Karlsruhe. Makarov's time in Germany was followed by spells at Berkut Ulm and SSV Ulm 1846.

In October 1948, Makarov signed for English non-league club Chelmsford City. Makarov played for the club four times, scoring three goals, before dropping down to the reserves.

In 1949, Makarov signed for Ligue 2 club Nîmes. Makarov played 29 times, scoring three goals, helping the club gain promotion to Ligue 1. Following promotion, Makarov appeared for Nîmes three times in the 1950–51 French Division 1. In 1951, Makarov signed for Grenoble, playing 11 times over the course of three seasons.

In 1954, Makarov moved to Canada, playing for Toronto Ukrainians before returning to France to sign for USM Montargis. In 1957, Makarov signed for US Viesly, becoming manager of the club in the process. Makarov's playing career was finished by a spell at FC Vauverdois.

== Personal life ==
Makarov used a number of aliases during his career, including Pawel Makar, Paul Makar and D. Makarpauu. Makarov gained French citizenship in 1949 and died in the country in 1963.
