= Alejandro Scopelli =

Argentine footballer (1908–1987)

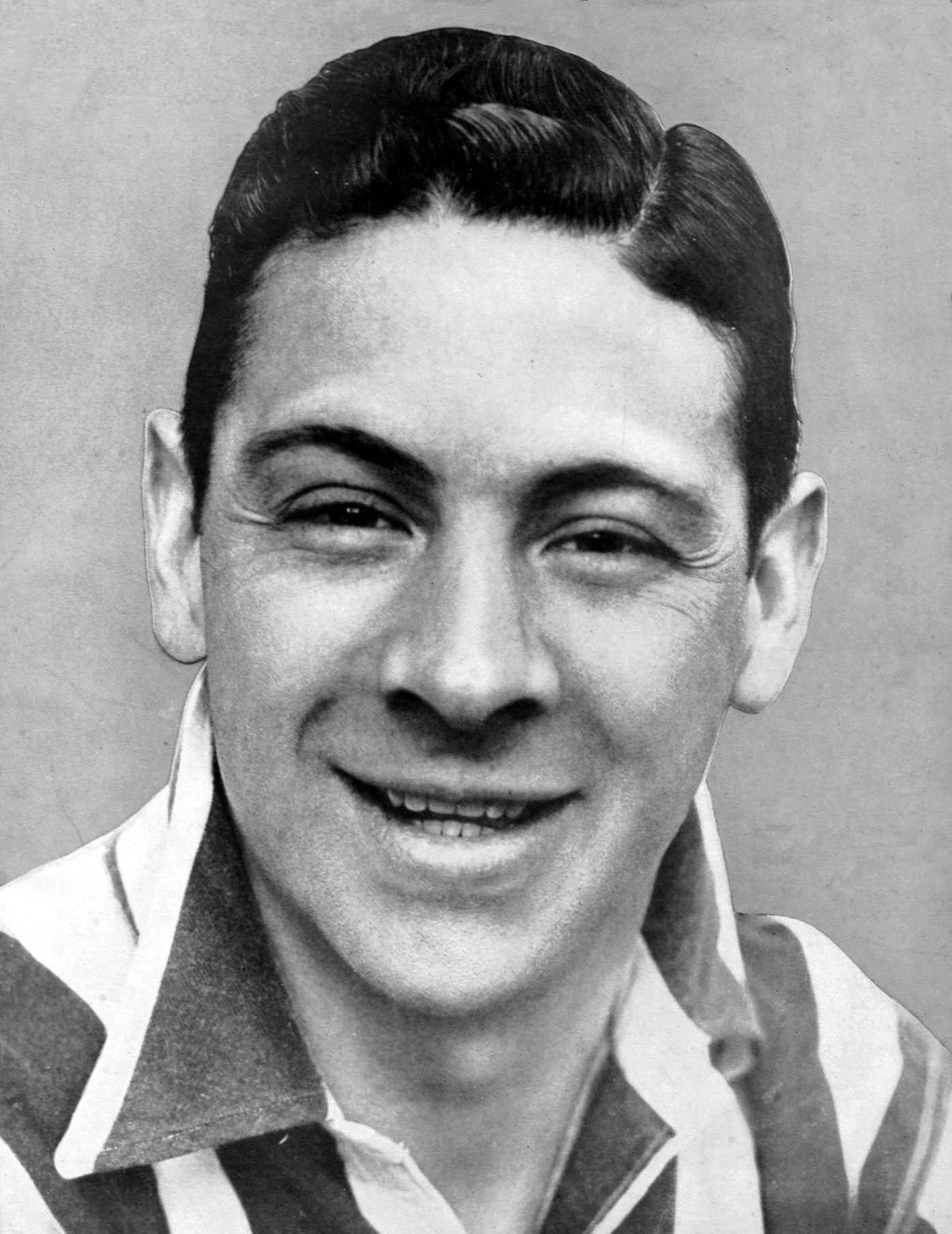
- Scopelli in 1931

Personal information
- Full name: Alejandro Scopelli Casanova
- Date of birth: 12 May 1908
- Place of birth: La Plata, Argentina
- Date of death: 23 October 1987 (aged 79)
- Place of death: Mexico City, Mexico
- Height: 1.73 m (5 ft 8 in)
- Position: Striker

Senior career*
Years	Team	Apps	(Gls)
1928–1933	Estudiantes	68	(45)
1933–1935	Roma	63	(24)
1936–1937	Racing Club	60	(44)
1937	Red Star	?	(24)
1938–1939	RCF Paris		
1939–1941	Belenenses		
1941	Unión SF	6	(1)
1941–1943	Universidad de Chile	27	(11)

International career
1929–1937	Argentina	8	(4)
1935	Italy	1	(0)

Managerial career
- 1939–1941: Belenenses
- 1941–1945: Universidad de Chile
- 1947–1948: Belenenses
- 1948–1949: Porto
- 1949–1950: Deportivo La Coruña
- 1950–1952: Universidad de Chile
- 1952–1954: Español
- 1955–1956: Sporting CP
- 1956–1957: Celta
- 1957–1959: Granada
- 1962–1963: Valencia
- 1963–1964: Espanyol
- 1964–1965: América
- 1966–1967: Chile
- 1970: América
- 1972–1974: Belenenses
- 1978–1979: América
Medal record
Men's Football
Representing Argentina
Copa América
Winner	1937 Argentina	Team
FIFA World Cup
Runner-up	1930 Uruguay	Team
- * Club domestic league appearances and goals

Alejandro Scopelli Casanova (Spanish pronunciation: [aleˈxandɾo eskoˈpeli], Italian: [skoˈpɛlli]; 12 May 1908 – 23 October 1987) was an Italian Argentine football player and coach. A striker, he played for Argentina between 1929 and 1941, and competed at the inaugural 1930 FIFA World Cup. He also represented the Italy national football team on one occasion.

== Playing career ==
Born in La Plata, Scopelli started his career in Argentina with Estudiantes de La Plata where he became part of the legendary side nicknamed "Los Profesores". In 1931 he scored 31 goals for the team but was beaten to the golden boot by teammate Alberto Zozaya's 33.

In 1933 Scopelli moved to Italy where he played for Roma. During this time he took the Italian citizenship (as oriundo) and played for the Italy national team. In 1936 Scopelli returned to Argentina to play for Racing Club de Avellaneda. In his later career he played for Red Star Paris in France, around the start of the Second World War he moved to neutral territory to play for Belenenses and then Benfica in Portugal. In 1942 Scopelli returned to South America to play for Universidad de Chile.

== Managerial career ==
After retirement he became a manager, coaching many club teams including Club América in Mexico, and Valencia CF Español and Deportivo de La Coruña in Spain, Belenenses Sporting CP and FC Porto in Portugal and Universidad de Chile.

Scopelli was the Sporting CP manager in the inaugural game of European Cup on 4 September 1955 against FK Partizan Belgrade.

Scopelli also coached at international level, with Chile, Portugal and Mexico.

== Death ==
Scopelli died in Mexico City on 22 October 1987, aged 79.

== Career statistics ==
=== International goals ===
Scores and results list Argentina's goal tally first, score column indicates score after each Scopelli goal.

List of international goals scored by Alejandro Scopelli
No.	Date	Venue	Opponent	Score	Result	Competition
1.	16 November 1929	Estadio Gasómetro, Buenos Aires, Argentina	Uruguay	2–0	2–0	Friendly
2.	26 July 1930	Estadio Centenario, Montevideo, Uruguay	United States	2–1	6–1	1930 FIFA World Cup
3.	9 January 1937	Estadio Gasómetro, Buenos Aires, Argentina	Paraguay	1–0	6–1	1937 South American Championship
4.	9 January 1937	Estadio Gasómetro, Buenos Aires, Argentina	Paraguay	4–0	6–1	1937 South American Championship

== Honours ==
=== Player ===
Argentina

- Copa América: 1937
- FIFA World Cup runner-up: 1930

=== Manager ===
Valencia

- Inter-Cities Fairs Cup: 1961-62, 1962-63

América

- Copa MX: 1963-64, 1964-65

Universidad de Chile

- Chilean Primera División: 1967

== See also ==
- Oriundo
