= Sergio Panzardo =

Uruguayan footballer (born 1965)

Personal information
- Full name: Sergio Antonio Panzardo
- Date of birth: 20 July 1965 (age 61)
- Place of birth: Montevideo, Uruguay
- Height: 1.80 m (5 ft 11 in)
- Position: Defender

Senior career*
Years	Team	Apps	(Gls)
1985–1987	C.A. Peñarol		
1988–1989	C.A. Bella Vista		
1989	SM Caen		
1990–1992	C.A. Peñarol		
1992–1995	Liverpool		

International career
1988	Uruguay	3	(0)
- * Club domestic league appearances and goals

Sergio Panzardo (born 20 July 1965) is a former Uruguayan professional football (soccer) player.
