= Luisinho (footballer, born 1911) =

Brazilian footballer

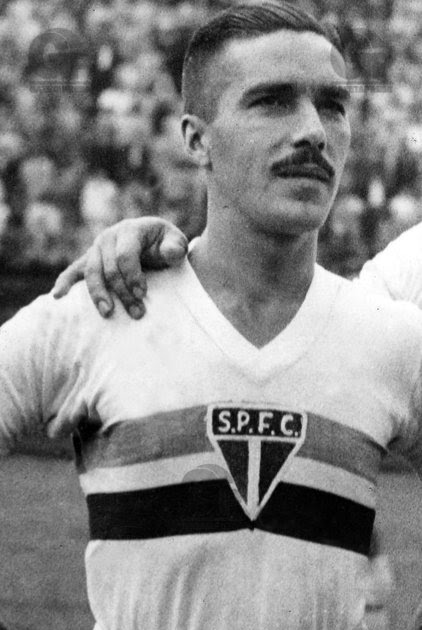
- Luisinho in 1932

Personal information
- Full name: Luís Mesquita de Oliveira
- Date of birth: 29 March 1911
- Place of birth: Rio de Janeiro, Brazil
- Date of death: 27 December 1983 (aged 72)
- Place of death: São Paulo, Brazil
- Position: Forward

Senior career*
Years	Team	Apps	(Gls)
1928	Anglo Brazileiro		
1929	Paulistano		
1930–1935	São Paulo		
1935	Estudantes		
1935–1941	Palestra Itália	232	(123)
1941–1946	São Paulo		

International career
1933–1944	Brazil	11	(4)
Medal record
Representing Brazil
FIFA World Cup
Third place	1938 France
- * Club domestic league appearances and goals

Luís Mesquita de Oliveira, best known as Luisinho, (29 March 1911, in Rio de Janeiro – 27 December 1983, in São Paulo) was an association footballer, one of the most valuable strikers of the 1930s.

During his career (1928–1946) he played for Anglo Brasileira, Paulistano, Estudantes São Paulo, São Paulo and Palmeiras. He won seven São Paulo State Championship (1929, 1931, 1936, 1940, 1943, 1945, 1946) and was top goalscorer of Campeonato Paulista in 1944 with 22 goals scored. He's also the six best top goalscorer in São Paulo Futebol Clube history with 145 goals, and nine best goalscorer in Palmeiras history with 123 goals from 1935 to 1941.

For the Brazil national football team he scored 4 goals at South American Championship 1937 and participated at the 1934 FIFA World Cup, played one match with Spain in Genoa, and in the 1938 FIFA World Cup, playing two matches.

He died at 72 years old.

== Honours ==
Paulistano

- Campeonato Paulista: 1929 LAF

São Paulo

- Campeonato Paulista: 1931, 1943, 1945, 1946

Palmeiras

- Campeonato Paulista: 1936, 1938 Extra, 1940
