= Alberto Zozaya =

Argentine footballer and manager

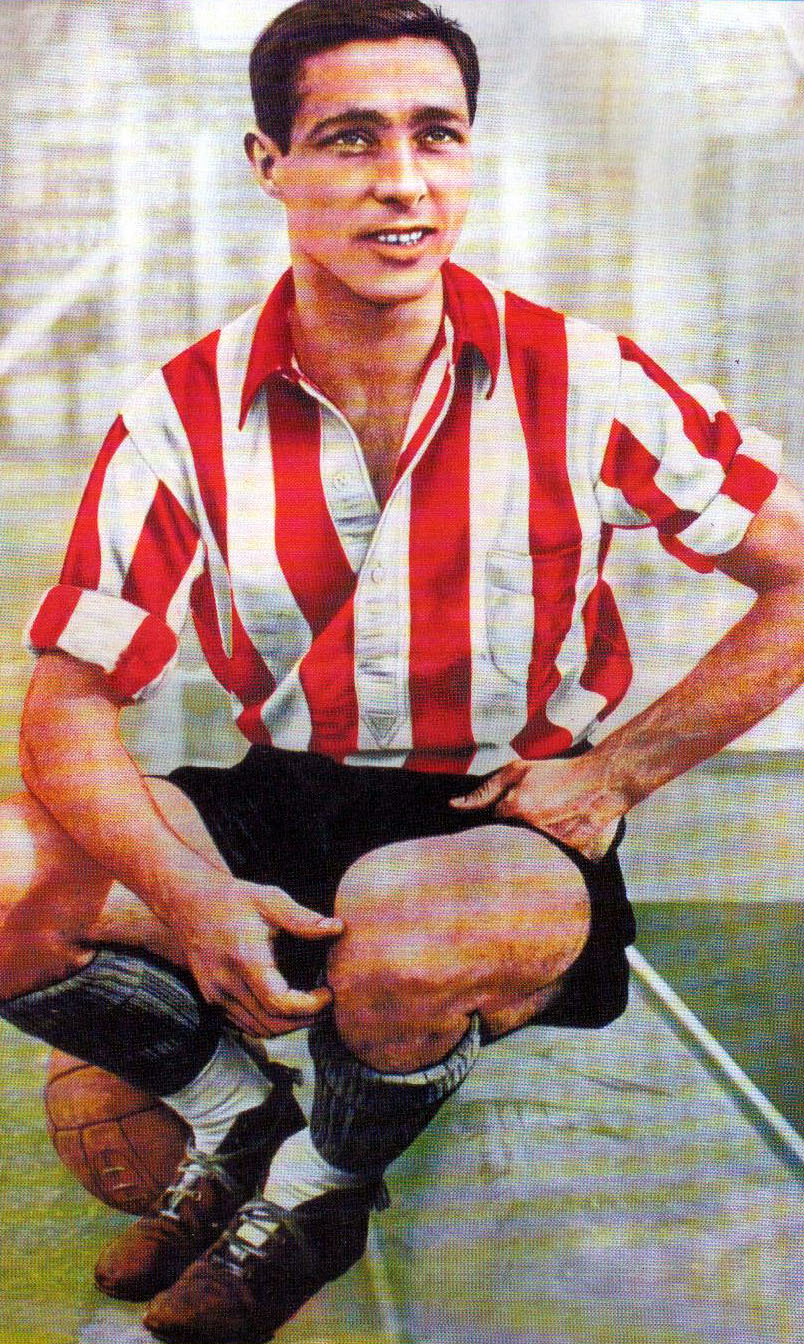

Personal information
- Full name: Alberto Máximo Zozaya
- Date of birth: 13 April 1908
- Place of birth: Urdinarrain, Argentina
- Date of death: 17 February 1981 (Aged 72)
- Place of death: La Plata, Argentina
- Position: Striker

Senior career*
Years	Team	Apps	(Gls)
1930–1939	Estudiantes	181	(144)
1940	Racing Club	2	(0)
1940	Bella Vista	?	

International career
1933–1937	Argentina	9	(8)

Managerial career
- 1945–1949: Estudiantes de La Plata
- 1952–1953: Benfica
- * Club domestic league appearances and goals

Alberto Maximo Zozaya (13 April 1908 – 17 February 1981) was an Argentine football striker who played most of his career for Estudiantes de La Plata and represented the Argentina national team.

== Playing career ==
Alberto "Don Padilla" Zozaya started his career in the early 1930s with Estudiantes. He was the first player to score a goal in the professional era of Argentine football, which began in 1931.

Zozaya became an integral part of the Estudiantes team of the 1930s nicknamed "Los Profesores" (The Professors). In 1931 he scored 33 goals in the league to become the top scorer in the Primera División Argentina and the whole of South America.

In 1937 Zozaya played in the South American Championship 1937 helping Argentina to win the title with a contribution of 5 goals.

In 1939 Zozaya moved to Racing Club de Avellaneda but he only played 2 games before moving to Bella Vista in Uruguay but he did not settle there either and retired at the end of the 1940 season.

== Personal life ==
He was a distant relative of goalkeeper from the Estudiantes de La Plata youth ranks, Juan Pablo Zozaya.

== Honours ==
=== Titles as a player ===
Argentina

- Copa América: 1937

=== Titles as a Manager ===
Estudiantes

- Copa de la República: 1945

=== Individual ===
- Argentine Primera División Top Scorer: 1931

== Managerial career ==
After retiring as a player Zozaya went into management, he was manager of Portuguese side Benfica from 1952 to 1953. He was also manager of Gimnasia de La Plata.
