= Roberto (footballer, born 1912) =

Brazilian footballer

Personal information
- Full name: Roberto Emílio da Cunha
- Date of birth: 20 June 1912
- Place of birth: Brazil
- Date of death: 20 March 1977 (aged 64)
- Position: Forward

Senior career*
Years	Team	Apps	(Gls)
- Flamengo
- São Cristovão

International career
1936-1938	Brazil	8	(3)
Medal record
Representing Brazil
FIFA World Cup
Third place	1938 France
- * Club domestic league appearances and goals

Roberto Emílio da Cunha, best known as Roberto (born in Niterói, June 20, 1912; died on March 20, 1977)Roberto was a Brazilian footballer who played as a striker.

In his career (1923–1941), he played for two club teams, Flamengo and São Cristovão. He represented the Brazil national team at the 1938 FIFA World Cup, playing two matches and scoring one goal.
