= Patesko =

Brazilian footballer (1910-1988)

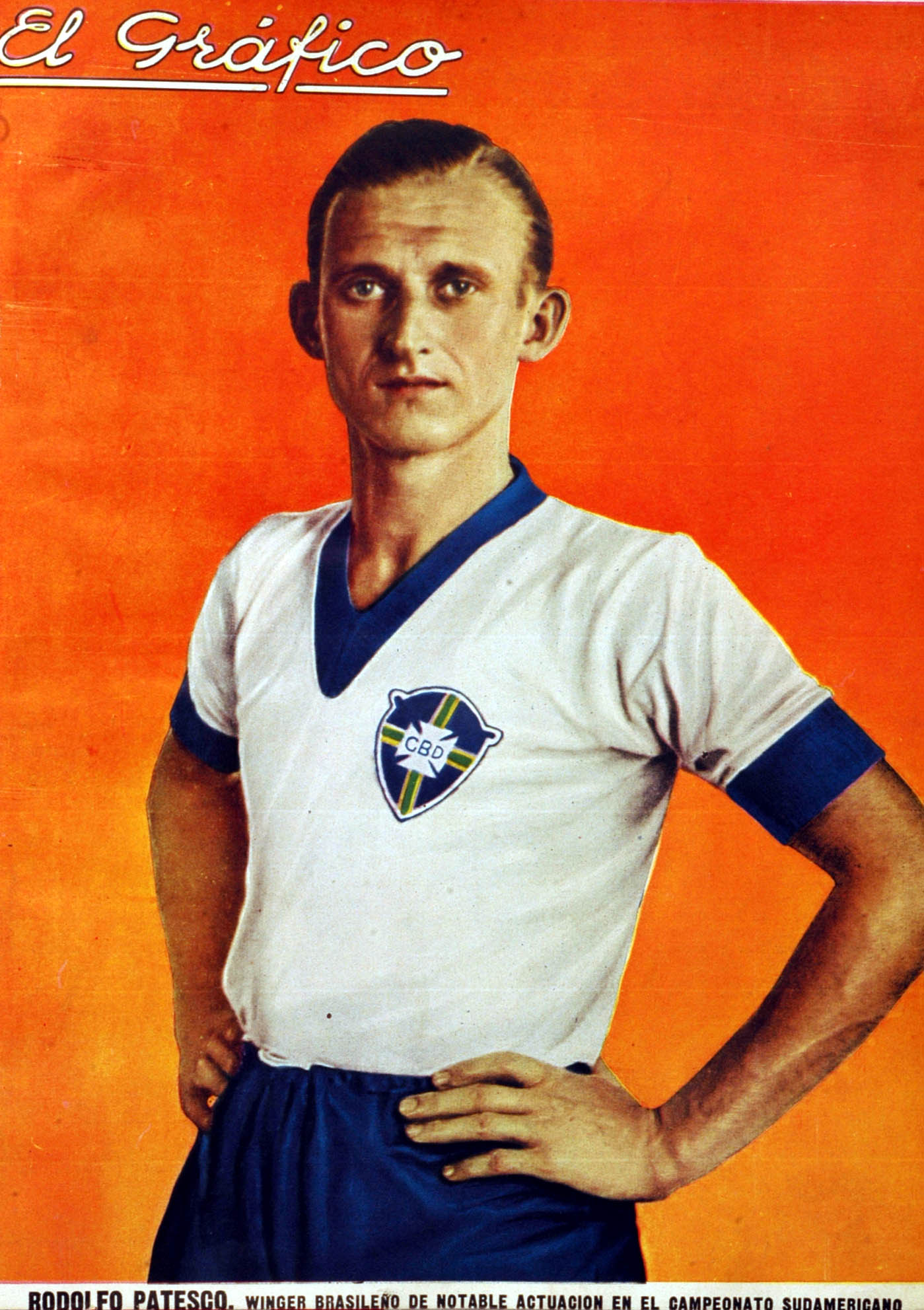

Personal information
- Full name: Rodolpho Barteczko
- Date of birth: 12 November 1910
- Place of birth: Curitiba, Brazil
- Date of death: 13 March 1988 (aged 77)
- Position: Forward

Senior career*
Years	Team	Apps	(Gls)
- Palestra Itália (PR)
- Força e Luz (RS)
- Nacional
- Botafogo

International career
- Brazil
Medal record
Representing Brazil
FIFA World Cup
Third place	1938 France
- * Club domestic league appearances and goals

Rodolpho Barteczko (12 November 1910 – 13 March 1988), best known as Patesko, was a Brazilian footballer who played striker. He was born in Curitiba, Brazil and died in Rio de Janeiro.

Of Polish origin, in his career (1930–1943) he played for Palestra Itália, Força e Luz, Nacional (where he won the Uruguayan championships of 1933) and Botafogo. He won the Rio de Janeiro State Tournament in 1935.

For the Brazilian team he participated at the 1934 and 1938 World Cups. He died at 77 years old.
