= Antônio Almeida =

Coordinates: 7.21889°S 44.1978°W

- Municipality
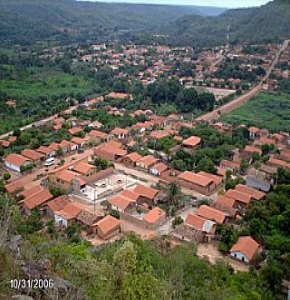

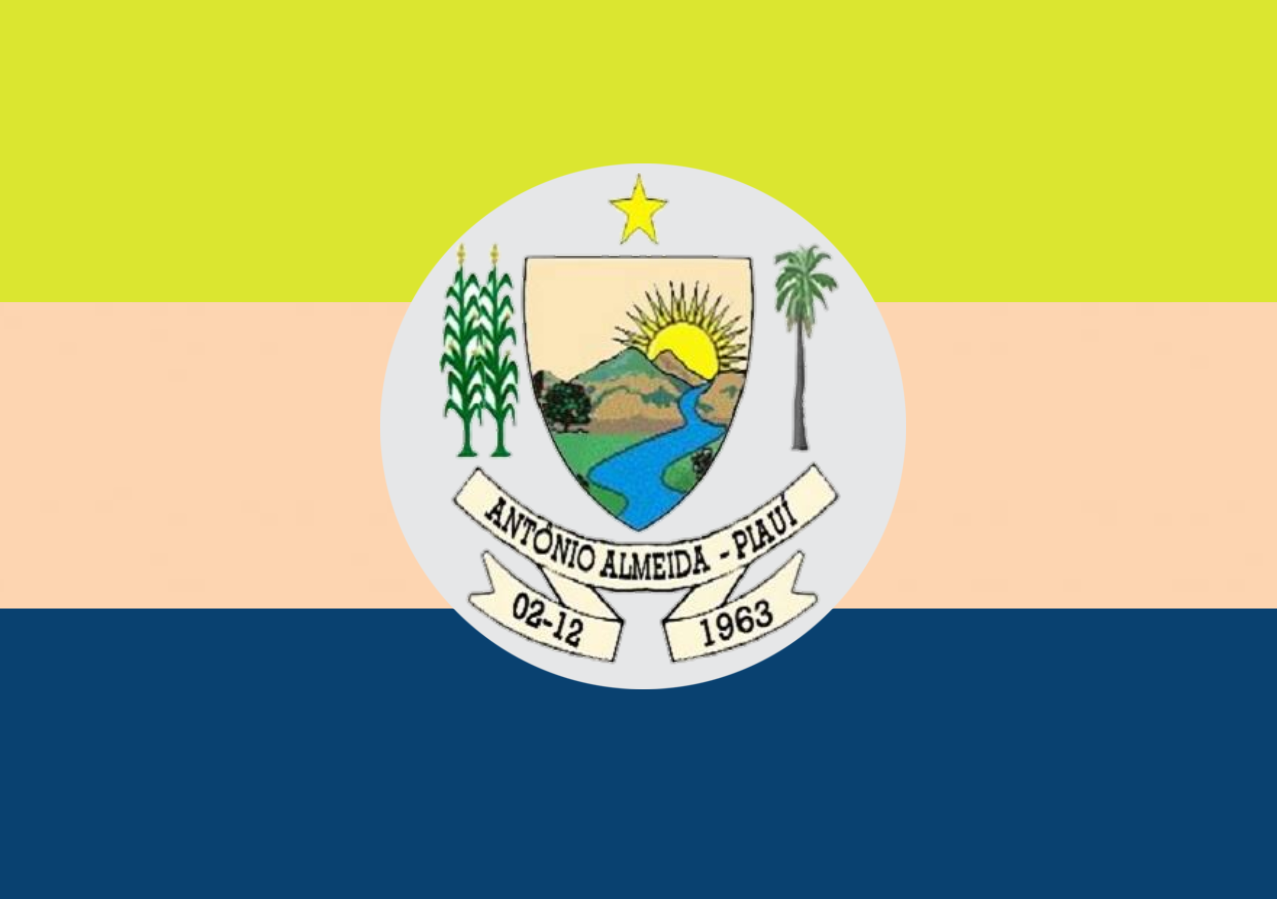
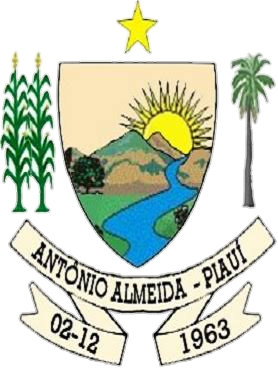
- Flag Coat of arms

- Country: Brazil
- Region: Nordeste
- State: Piauí
- Mesoregion: Sudoeste Piauiense

Population (2020)
  - Total: 3,170
- Time zone: UTC−3 (BRT)

Antônio Almeida is a municipality in the state of Piauí in the Northeast region of Brazil.

== See also ==
- List of municipalities in Piauí
