= Estadio Gasómetro =

Defunct football stadium in Buenos Aires, Argentina

Coordinates: 34°38′06.06″S 58°25′24.68″W

San Lorenzo Stadium
- Estadio de San Lorenzo
- El Gasómetro
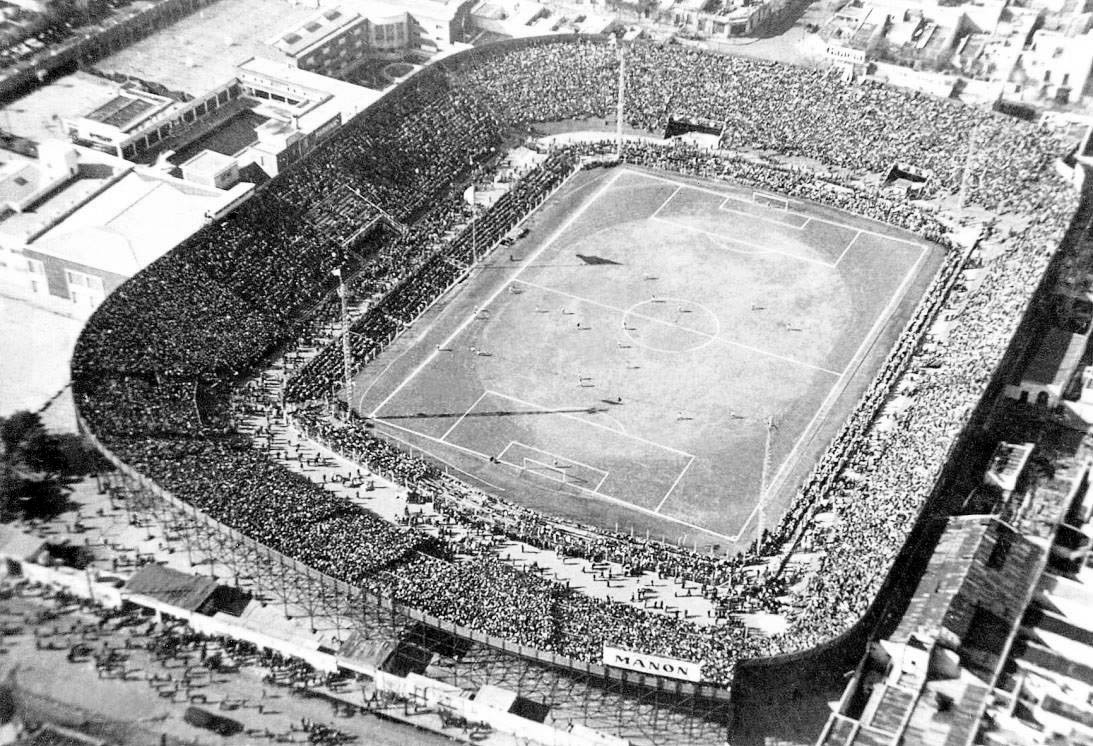
- Aerial view of the stadium, 1950
- Interactive map of San Lorenzo Stadium
- Full name: Estadio del Club Atlético San Lorenzo de Almagro
- Address: Av. La Plata and Inclán; Buenos Aires; Argentina
- Owner: San Lorenzo de Almagro
- Capacity: 75,000
- Type: Stadium
- Event: Sporting events
- Surface: Grass
- Field size: 110 x 70 m

Construction
- Opened: 7 May 1916
- Closed: 2 December 1979
- Demolished: August 1981
- Years active: 1916–1979

Tenants
- San Lorenzo de Almagro (1916–1979); Argentina national football team (1929–1956)

Website
- sanlorenzo.com.ar/viejogasometro

El Gasómetro, officially named San Lorenzo Stadium, was a football stadium located in the neighborhood of Boedo in Buenos Aires. Inaugurated in 1916, the stadium was the home ground of club San Lorenzo de Almagro before they moved to their new venue, Estadio Pedro Bidegain, which is sometimes referred to as Nuevo Gasómetro ("New Gasometer"), in 1993. The stadium had a capacity of 75,000 people.

The stadium was nicknamed Gasómetro due to its exterior facade that reminded of a gas holder, very common at the time. It has a capacity of 75,000 spectators, being the largest stadium of Argentina until the construction of El Cilindro, home venue of Racing Club de Avellaneda, inaugurated in 1950. Racing's stadium had a capacity of 100,000 spectators, then reduced to 66,000 in the 1990s. The stadium was one of the venues for the 1929 South American Championship.

== History ==
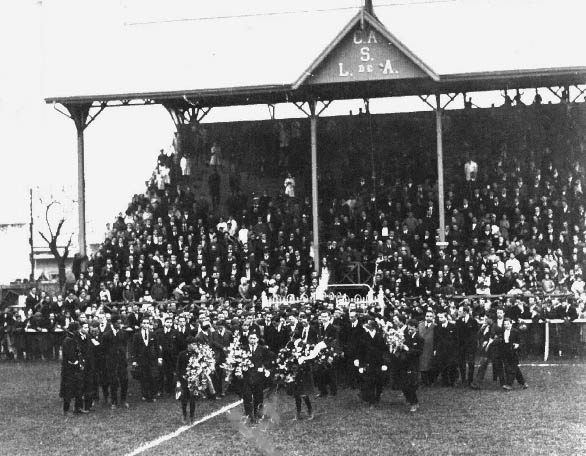
Funeral of player Jacobo Urso in the stadium, August 1922

The stadium was inaugurated on May 7, 1916, in a Primera División match between San Lorenzo and Estudiantes de La Plata, won by San Lorenzo 2–1. During the first years of the 1920s the club built a grandstand with roof. In August 1922, the stadium hosted the funeral of player Jacobo Urso, died on 6 August in the hospital. Urso had been injured in a match against Estudiantes de Buenos Aires, where he broke some ribs after a collision with an opponent. 7,000 people attended Urso's funeral, with his coffin being carried by his teammates and players of Czech team Teplitzer FK, which was touring Argentina at the time of the funeral.

In June 1928, San Lorenzo acquired the land they rented and started a new refurbishing on it. The new structures used for the exterior changed the face of the stadium, resembling a gas holder so it would be soon nicknamed Gasómetro. The Argentina national football team played its first match at Gasómetro on June 16, 1929, beating Uruguay 2–0 in a friendly match. Both teams faced again on 28 September in a Copa Lipton match, in front of a huge attendance.

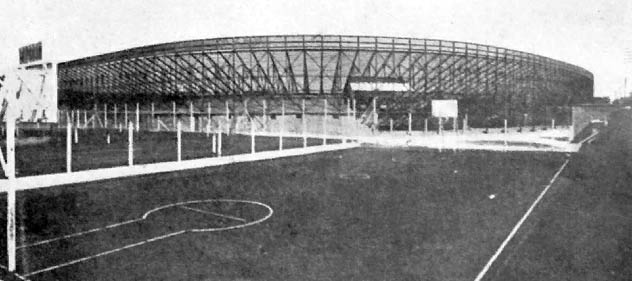
As the facade of the stadium looked like a gas holder, it was nicknamed Gasómetro

Despite being the largest stadium of the time, the huge attendance frequently surpassed the stadium's capacity. In 1935, San Lorenzo announced they were planning to acquired a land to build a new stadium for 150,000 spectators. The land was located only 20 blocks from the Gasómetro. Nevertheless, the project was soon abandoned and never relaunched.

In 1936, San Lorenzo installed the first lighting system in the stadium. Lights were mounted on four columns placed on the four sides of the field. Three years later, the old grandstand with roof was replaced and the stadium extended its capacity to 75,000. During the end of the 1930s, the Gasómetro hosted three games of Copa Aldao, the most important competition in South America by then.

The club's debt grew in the 1970s and they were forced to sell the ground to the government in 1979, who subsequently sold it to Carrefour supermarket. The last match played at the Gasómetro was hosted on December 2, 1979. San Lorenzo and Boca Juniors tied 0–0 in a 1979 Torneo Nacional match. The stadium was demolished two years later.

== Return to Boedo ==
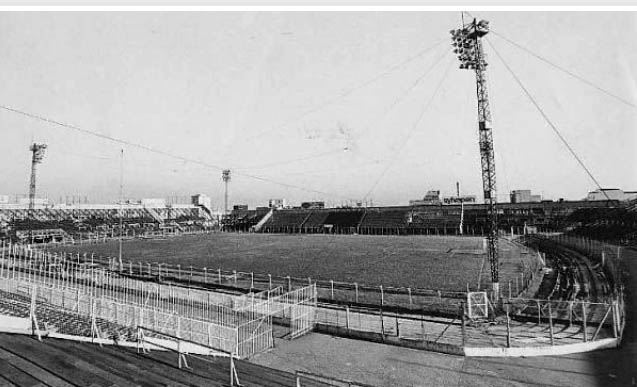
View of the stadium in 1970

After the stadium was closed, San Lorenzo fans made several attempts to get the former land back to the institution. In 2008, the Legislature of Buenos Aires approved a project of "Historic Restitution" of the Avenida La Plata land. In 2010, supporters of the club carried the project of Historic Restitution to the National Legislature. The project included the expropriation of the land on Avenida La Plata (where French chain Carrefour had built a supermarket there) and the restitution to Club San Lorenzo. On March 8, 2012, 100,000 people met at Plaza de Mayo to claim for the law, which was finally approved on 15 November 2012.

On April 4, 2014, the club signed an agreement with Carrefour which stated that the land would be restituted to San Lorenzo, with the club and the supermarket sharing the land. In April 2019, Carrefour announced that the supermarket on Avenida La Plata would be closed permanently.

Preceded by Estadio Nacional; Lima	Campeonato Sudamericano; Venue; 1929	Succeeded by Estadio Nacional; Lima
Preceded by Estadio Nacional; Lima	Campeonato Sudamericano; Venue; 1937	Succeeded by Estadio Nacional; Lima
Preceded by Estadio Nacional; Santiago	Campeonato Sudamericano; Venue; 1946	Succeeded by Estadio George Capwell; Guayaquil
