= Casseta Popular =

Brazilian magazine

- A cover satirizing the President of Brazil, Fernando Collor de Mello.
- Categories: Humor
- Founder: Beto Silva; Hélio de la Peña; Marcelo Madureira
- First issue: 1978
- Final issue: 1992
- Country: Brazil
- Based in: Rio de Janeiro, Brazil
- Language: Portuguese

Casseta Popular was a Brazilian humorous publication created in 1978 by UFRJ students as an artisanal fanzine, evolving into an anarchic and irreverent humor tabloid in the 1980s. Sold at alternative venues in Rio de Janeiro, the publication stood out for its irreverent covers and biting satires that challenged political figures and social behaviors. The vehicle achieved cult status until, in the mid-1980s, the group merged with the team from the newspaper O Planeta Diário, resulting in the formation of the successful multimedia group Casseta & Planeta.

== History ==
The history of Casseta Popular began in 1978, when three engineering students from the Federal University of Rio de Janeiro (UFRJ), Beto Silva, Helio de la Peña, and Marcelo Madureira, tired of academic routine and the lack of women in the course, decided to create a humorous fanzine. The name Casseta Popular emerged as a parody of the word "gazeta" (gazette), since, according to the founders, "what engineering had the most of was casseta" (slang for an ugly woman). The first edition was produced artisanally, with typed pages reproduced on an alcohol mimeograph, selling only 100 copies during class breaks.

In 1980, the publication underwent its first major transformation, evolving from a fanzine into a tabloid of anarchic and outrageous humor. To handle the new format, the original trio invited Bussunda, Claudio Manoel, and Ronaldo Balassiano to join the project. The tabloid was sold in bars, beaches, and nightlife spots in Rio de Janeiro, gradually achieving cult status with its humor that combined political critique and satires of social behavior. The covers were particularly notorious—one of them, following the crash of VASP Flight 168, showed body parts as a puzzle with the headline "Assemble Your VASP Passenger Here," even being rejected by some print shops. Despite its editorial success, the project was not financially profitable, and most members kept conventional jobs.

In 1984, the Rio de Janeiro printed humor scene gained a new competitor: O Planeta Diário, created by Hubert, Reinaldo, and Cláudio Paiva. Unlike Casseta, Planeta was born with national distribution at newsstands. Despite the competition, the two groups maintained friendly relations, with mutual collaborations since Planeta's first issue. This closeness would lead, in 1986, to the launch of the Almanaque Casseta Popular by publisher Núcleo 3, the same as O Planeta Diário, marking the official beginning of the partnership between the two groups.

More than a traditional newspaper, Casseta Popular was characterized as a humorous magazine or periodical, focused on cartoons and satirical content, which gave it a format and purpose distinct from the conventional press. Its covers became emblematic, following the model of publications like National Lampoon and Hara-Kiri, with layouts that mimicked "serious" magazines but with absolutely absurd themes. The content included parodies of major reports, fake advertisements, interviews, and pseudo-intellectual studies. One of the most impactful moments was in 1988, when the magazine launched the campaign to elect Tião, a chimpanzee from the Rio de Janeiro Zoological Garden, as mayor of the city—the animal ended up winning an impressive 9.5% of the votes.

In 1987, the humorists founded the company Toviassú Produções Artísticas, whose name was an acronym-like play on the phrase "Todo viado é surdo" (a nonsensical Portuguese phrase). Under this label, they began publishing Casseta Popular and, later, the magazine Casseta & Planeta. The group also expanded its business into other products, such as the famous "camissetas"—t-shirts with absurd prints and sayings sold via mail order—and even opened the bar Casseta Shopping Show in Botafogo in 1989.

The trajectory of Casseta Popular as an independent publication came to an end in 1992, when it merged its content with O Planeta Diário to give rise to the magazine Casseta & Planeta. The merger reflected the group's growing involvement with other media, especially television. Since 1988, the humorists had already been working as writers for TV Pirata on Rede Globo, and in 1992 they would premiere the show Casseta & Planeta, Urgente!, which would become a landmark of Brazilian television humor for 18 years. The printed publication continued until the mid-1990s, but the legacy of Casseta Popular remained as the origin of one of the country's most influential humorous groups.
