= Hélio de la Peña =

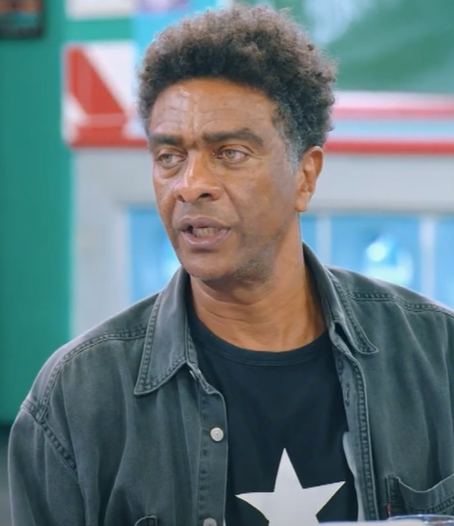
- De la Peña in 2024
- Born: Hélio Antonio do Couto Filho; 18 June 1959 (age 67); Rio de Janeiro, Brazil
- Occupations: Actor, comedian, director, writer
- Known for: Casseta & Planeta

Helio Antonio do Couto Filho, known by his artistic name Hélio de la Peña (born 18 June 1959) is a Brazilian actor, composer, writer, director, engineer, presenter, and comedian. He is a member of the comedy group Casseta & Planeta.

== Biography ==
De la Peña was born on 18 June 1959 in Rio de Janeiro. Through his mother, he is descended from quilombolas, and through her, has relatives that reside in communities descended from the quilombos in the Dores de Macabu district of Campos dos Goytacazes, Rio de Janeiro. He also has German ancestry through his great-grandfather. Born into a humble family in the Vila da Penha neighborhood of Rio de Janeiro, he eventually received a scholarship to study at Colégio de São Bento, where he was a top student, becoming the champion of the Olimpíada Brasileira de Matemática. He went to study at the Federal University of Rio de Janeiro to study Production Engineering, becoming colleagues with future Casseta & Planeta members Marcelo Madureira and Beto Silva. The trio founded the humor fanzine Casseta Popular in 1978. He worked for Promon Engenharia and participated in Banda Casseta & Planeta. He was one of the writers for TV Pirata from 1988 to 1990 and again in 1992.

With Casseta & Planeta, he wrote and acted in films such as A Taça do Mundo É Nossa (2003), directed by Lula Buarque, and Seus Problemas Acabaram (2006), directed by José Lavigne. He also released the book O Livro do Papai (with book publisher Objetiva) in 2003, and later the comedy romance book Vai na Bola, Glanderson (Objetiva) in 2006. He adopted O Livro do Papai for television, creating a four-episode special titled Paidecendo no Paraíso (GNT, 2007). With Arlindo Cruz and Mu Chebabi, he is the author of Samba da Globalização, which was released on Rede Globo in 2008.

In addition to his previous work, he also currently does standup comedy.

== Filmography ==
=== Television ===
Year	Title	Role	Notes
1991	Doris para Maiores	Himself	Also writer and reporter
1992–2010	Casseta & Planeta, Urgente!	Various roles	Also writer and actor
2012	Casseta & Planeta Vai Fundo	Various roles	Also writer and actor
2014	Segunda Dama	Edimúcio de Jesus	Series
2014	Didi e o Segredo dos Anjos	Ernânio / Narrator	TV film
2015–2016	Totalmente Demais	Dr. José Pedro Ribeiro (Zé Pedro)	Telenovela
2021	Meu amigo Bussunda	Himself	Mini-series
2024	Encantado's	Simpatia	Episode: "Um dia, um adeus"
2025	Show 60 Anos	Chicória Maria	60 Anos Globo special
2026	O Mistério de Varginha	Himself	Documentary, episode: "2"

=== As editor/director ===
Year	Title
1987	Wandergleyson Show
1988–1990; 1992	TV Pirata
1992–2010	Casseta & Planeta, Urgente!
1993–1995	Os Trapalhões
2012	Casseta & Planeta Vai Fundo

=== Film ===
Year	Title	Role
2003	Casseta & Planeta: A Taça do Mundo É Nossa	Denílson / Pelé
2006	Casseta & Planeta: Seus Problemas Acabaram!	Various roles
2014	Muita Calma Nessa Hora 2	Segurança
2018	O Amor Dá Trabalho	Xiva
2019	Correndo Atrás	Berinjela
2022	Vizinhos	Otaviano
2023	Perdida	Dr. Almeida
2025	Todo Mundo (Ainda) Tem Problemas Sexuais	Jorge

=== Internet ===
Year	Title	Role	Note
2016	Totalmente Sem Noção Demais	Zé Pedro	Online spin-off of Totalmente Demais
2016–present	Casseta & Planeta	Himself	YouTube channel

== Bibliography ==
=== Works ===
- Peña, Helio de la (2003). O Livro Do Papai. Rio de Janeiro: Objetiva. p. 152. ISBN 85-7302-509-3.
- Peña, Helio de la (2006). Vai na bola, Glanderson!. Rio de Janeiro: Objetiva. ISBN 85-7302-781-9.
- Peña, Helio de la (2010). Meu Pequeno Botafoguense. Rio de Janeiro: Belas-Letras. p. 24. ISBN 978-85-60174-48-5.
- Gomes, Daniel Takata & Peña, Helio de la (2017). Poliana Okimoto. São Paulo: Contexto. p. 240. ISBN 855200013X.
