= Tiao =

Tiao may refer to:

== People ==
- Diao or Tiao, a Chinese surname
- Luc-Adolphe Tiao (born 1954), Burkinabé politician and former Prime Minister
- Will Tiao (born 1973), American actor and producer
- Xie Tiao (464–499), Chinese poet
- Tião (basketball) (born 1925), full name Sebastião Amorim Gimenez, Brazilian basketball player
- Tião (footballer, born 1918), full name Sebastião Silva, Brazilian football forward
- Tião (footballer, born 1936), full name Sebastião Pereira dos Santos, Brazilian football forward
- Tião (footballer, born 1941), full name Sebastião Rocha, Brazilian football winger
- Tião (footballer, born 1948), full name Sebastião Carlos da Silva, Brazilian football forward
- Tião Carreiro (fl. 1958–1993), member of Brazilian musical duo
- Tião Macalé (comedian) (1926–1993), Brazilian comedian
- Tião Macalé (footballer) (1936–1972), Brazilian football midfielder
- Tião Viana (born 1961), Brazilian doctor and politician

== See also ==
- Tiao-kuai, Chinese system
- Padre Tião (1965–1966), Brazilian telenovela
- Macaco Tião (1963–1996), Brazilian chimpanzee
- Tião (dolphin) (fl. 1994), a Brazilian dolphin
