= Alberto Cargnin =

Alberto Cargnin (September 5, 1925 – 2007) was a writer, journalist and writer born in Tubarão, Santa Catarina state. He grow up in the Oficinas area, and since young age had a great love for the nature and journalism. Still young he collaborated for the weekly "Correio do Sul", soon after wrote and kept for long the column "Flagrantes da Cidade" (Instants of the City) in the "O Nosso Jornal" newspaper, and also founded and directed the "Folha do Sul" newspaper. He had already moved to Florianópolis (in 1979) when he founded and directed the "Jornal de São José" (Newspaper from Sao Jose). He got a graduation in Accountability in Curitiba and Economics Sciences at FESSC, which later gave origin to the UNISUL. He was auditor of CASAN for fifteen years and as President of MOBRAL he helped the city of Tubarao be the state winner against the Illiteracy, helping more than three thousand people to become literate. His Campaigns for Preservation of the Nature marked time, when along a decade, in several places of the city more than five thousands trees were planted and protected, like flamboyants, ipês and garapuvús, that still today decorate the margins of the river Tubarao. He wrote the books "Tubarão no Tempo das Serestas" and "Tubarão do Primeiro Centenário ao Fim do Milênio", showing his love for his city. He was member of the "Academia Tubaronense de Letras" or "Academy of Letters of Tubarao", as well as of the "Academia São José de Letras". He was married with Mylma Neves Cargnin, who died from cancer in 1982. He then got married with Mirian Teresinha Amorim, who was his companion since 1986. He was run by a car in front of his apartment in Florianópolis and died in 03-05-2007. He had 3 sons and 4 daughters from his first wife.

== See also ==
http://www.camaratubarao .sc.gov.br/index.php ?mostra_noticia&vcod_not =26
