= Marcelo Madureira =

Brazilian comedian (born 1958)

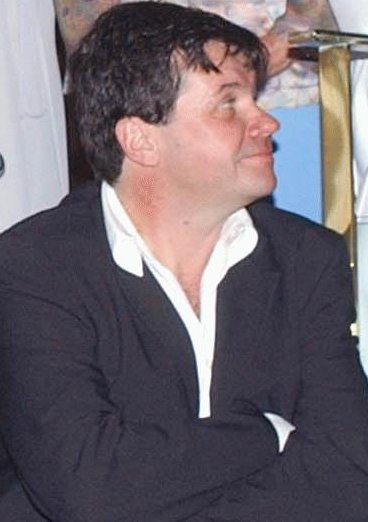
- Marcelo Madureira (photo by José Cruz/ABr)
- Born: Marcelo Barreto Garmatter; May 24, 1958 (age 68); Curitiba, Paraná, Brazil
- Known for: Actor, Comedian

Marcelo Madureira is the stage name of Marcelo Barreto Garmatter (Curitiba, May 24, 1958), a Brazilian comedian. He was part of the troupe that developed and presented between 1992 and 2010, the comedy show Casseta & Planeta Urgente at Rede Globo. Along with another group member, Hubert, he writes the Coluna do Agamenon to the newspaper O Globo. He was professor of mathematics of an old Brazilian education program, MOBRAL and is a graduate in Production Engineering at the School of Engineering at UFRJ, having worked as an engineer in the Planning Department of the Brazilian Development Bank (BNDES). Madureira is a black belt in judo and has been married for 25 years to the psychoanalyst Claudia, with whom he had three children.

== Biography ==
Marcelo Madureira lived in Curitiba until age 13, when he moved with his family to Rio de Janeiro. Son of former members of the Brazilian Communist Party (PCB), Madureira studied in a school which now he describes as "a den of Communism" and where he became active in left-wing underground organizations (he was a member of the PCB).

Madureira does analysis since 14-year-old, a custom in his family (including his parents). He argues that "psychoanalysis is the aerobics of the soul." But he admits that has relationship problems with others and defines himself as a person of "difficult temperament, irascible, sometimes."

Although he claims to do "serious humor" (his older brother considered him a "Brazilian Woody Allen"), Madureira paradoxically states that his "mental age is 13 to 14 years old, most of the time."

== Casseta & Planeta ==
Since 1978, along with four university colleagues, he began publishing the humorous tabloid Casseta Popular, which in 1986 became the Almanaque Casseta Popular magazine. In 1992, the Almanac merged with the humour newspaper Planeta Diário (Daily Planet), which has led to the magazine Casseta & Planeta that lasted until 1995.

Despite having been a Communist in his youth, Madureira said he had "no aversion to Globo," a television network linked to the Brazilian military regime (1964–1985). This undoubtedly made things easier when he and his fellow comedians were hired by Rede Globo in 1992, to star in the comedy show Casseta & Planeta Urgente in primetime on Tuesday nights. Although the President of the Globo Organizations, Roberto Marinho, feared the reactions against a program whose humour he regarded as "scatological", it proved to be a great success, with the group being ranked "the most powerful artists of the country" in 2003 by Veja, and the show lasting until 2010 (four years after the death of Bussunda, the group's most popular member).

== Controversies ==
Madureira believes that in Brazil there is a "dictatorship of the majority", which has "difficulties in dealing with the different, with something that is not consensus." Among the "different", would be the humour practiced by Casseta & Planeta, a victim of what he considers an "anti-Casseta militancy" which would use social networks "to offend and even threaten."

In 2003, Lula da Silva began his first term and became one of the most popular politicians in the History of Brazil - apart from being a perfect target for comedians of all ideological hues, due to his low educational level and the use of quaint expressions. In Casseta & Planeta Urgente, the Brazilian President was parodied by Bussunda, who died while covering the 2006 Soccer World Cup in Germany. In an official statement, Lula da Silva regretted the death of the comedian, regarded by him as "a great artist, a youthful symbol of Brazilian creativity and irreverence."

In September 2006, the "Casseta" Claudio Manoel said: "I was never a Lula voter and did not expect much from him. I find it sad the continuity of a government in which I do not personally believe." The tone of the criticism (in the show and beyond) would be increased in subsequent years, Marcelo Madureira standing out. On the night of the first round of the 2010 presidential election, he said at the program Manhattan Connection (GNT, Globo TV) that Lula da Silva was "an impostor, a tramp and a swindler" and that Dilma Rousseff looked like a "transvestite of Kim Jong-Il." The controversial part was deleted in subsequent repetitions of the program, but it can be easily found on YouTube.
