= Luba TV =

Brazilian YouTuber

Luba
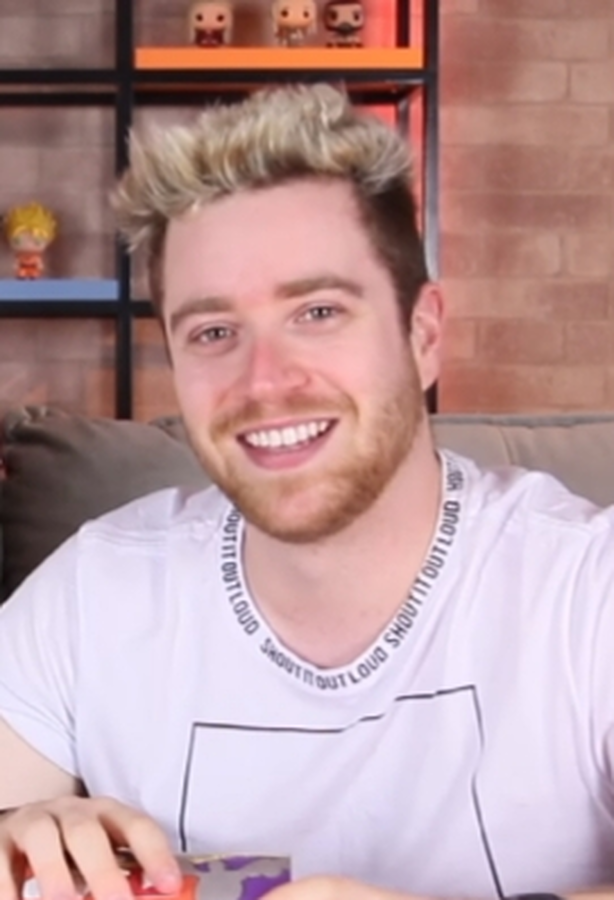
- Luba in 2017
- Born: Lucas Rossi Feuerschütte; May 15, 1990 (age 35); Tubarão, Santa Catarina, Brazil
- Other names: Luba TV

Lucas Rossi Feuerschütte (born 15 May 1990) is a Brazilian YouTuber.

== Awards and nominations ==
Year	Award	Category	Result	Reference
2016	Meus Prêmios Nick	Favorite Male YouTuber	Won	
2017	Meus Prêmios Nick	Favorite Male YouTuber	Nominated	
