= Willy Zumblick =

Brazilian painter (1913–2008)

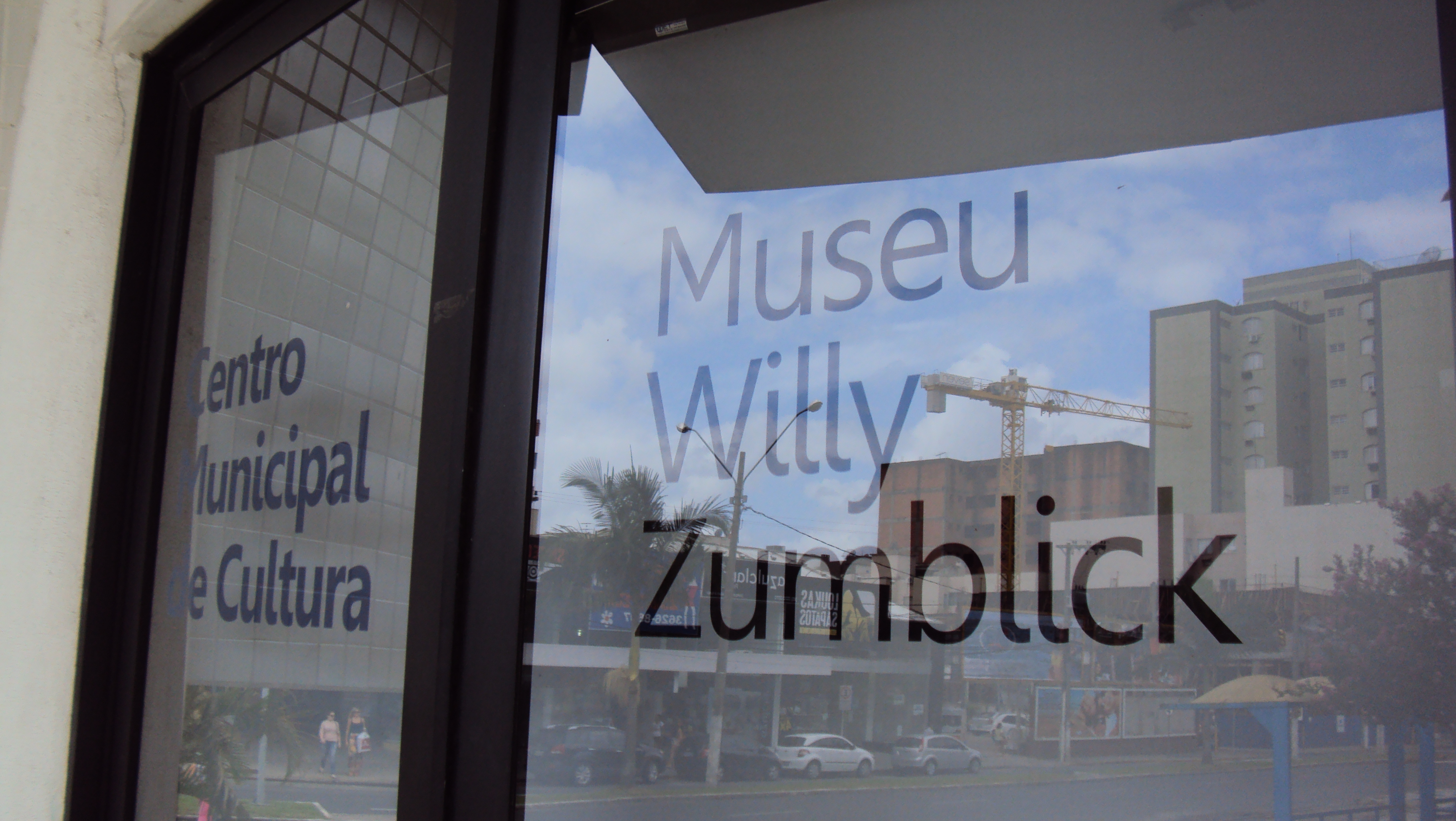
Museu Willy Zumblick em Tubarão.

Willy Alfredo Zumblick (September 13, 1913 – April 3, 2008) was a Brazilian painter born in Tubarão, Santa Catarina state. His art expose historical facts, specially from his hometown.

Zumblick was born into an immigrant family. His father Roberto Zumblick came from Frankfurt am Main in 1903 and founded a watchmaker's shop. Willy worked with his father in his childhood. He started painting in his adolescence describing historical landscapes, facts, popular people and daily scenes of Santa Catarina people. He was awarded by the Rotary International as one of the 100 Famous Rotarians. He is an honorary member of Rotary Club Tubarão.

In 2000 the city of Tubarão built a museum in downtown area and named it after Zumblick. The museum holds most of his works.

Willy Zumblick died in his hometown on April 3, 2008, aged 94.
