= Tubarão =

Tubarão, Santa Catarina
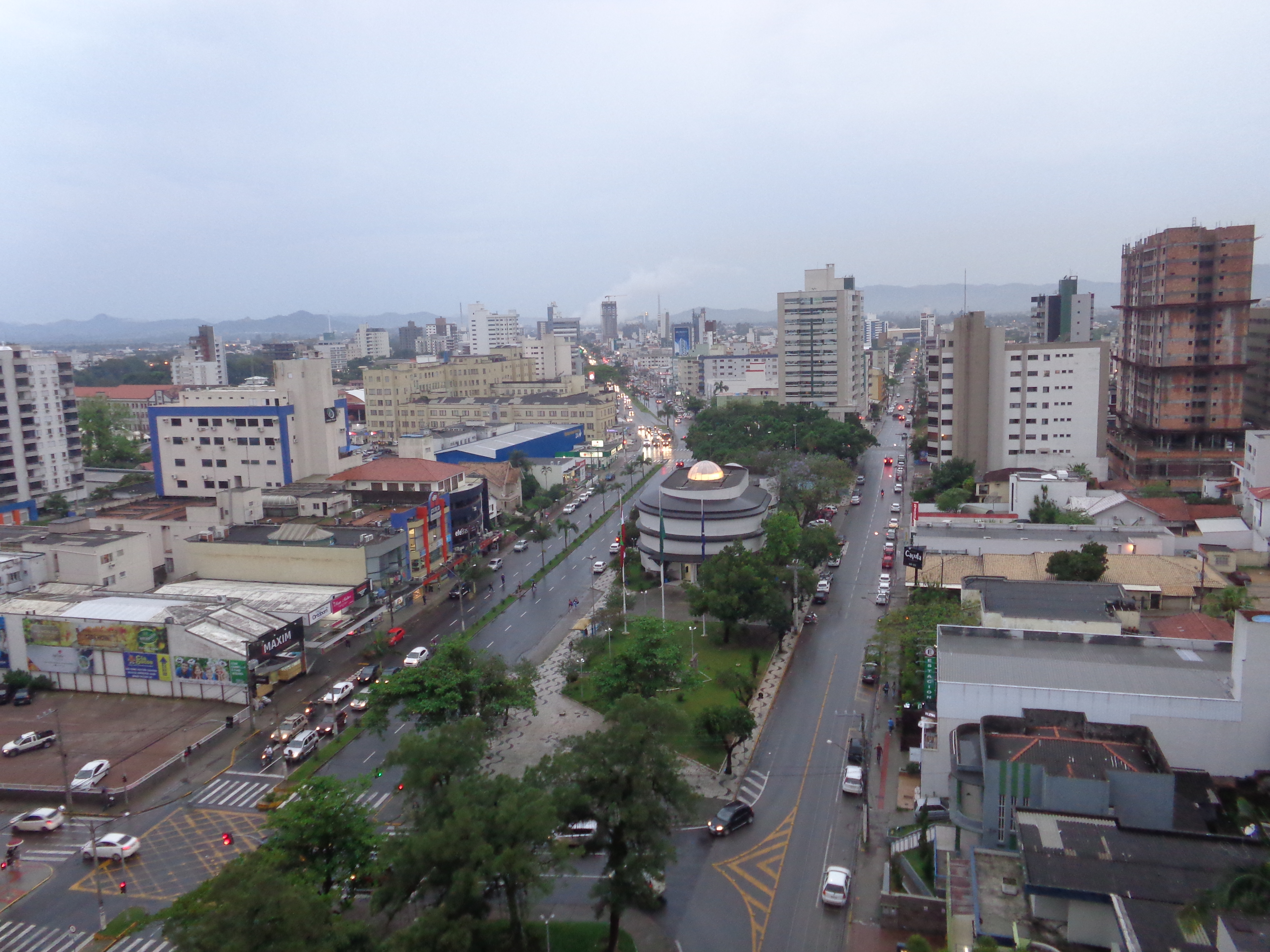
- View from Tubarão downtown highlighting the Willy Zumblick museum

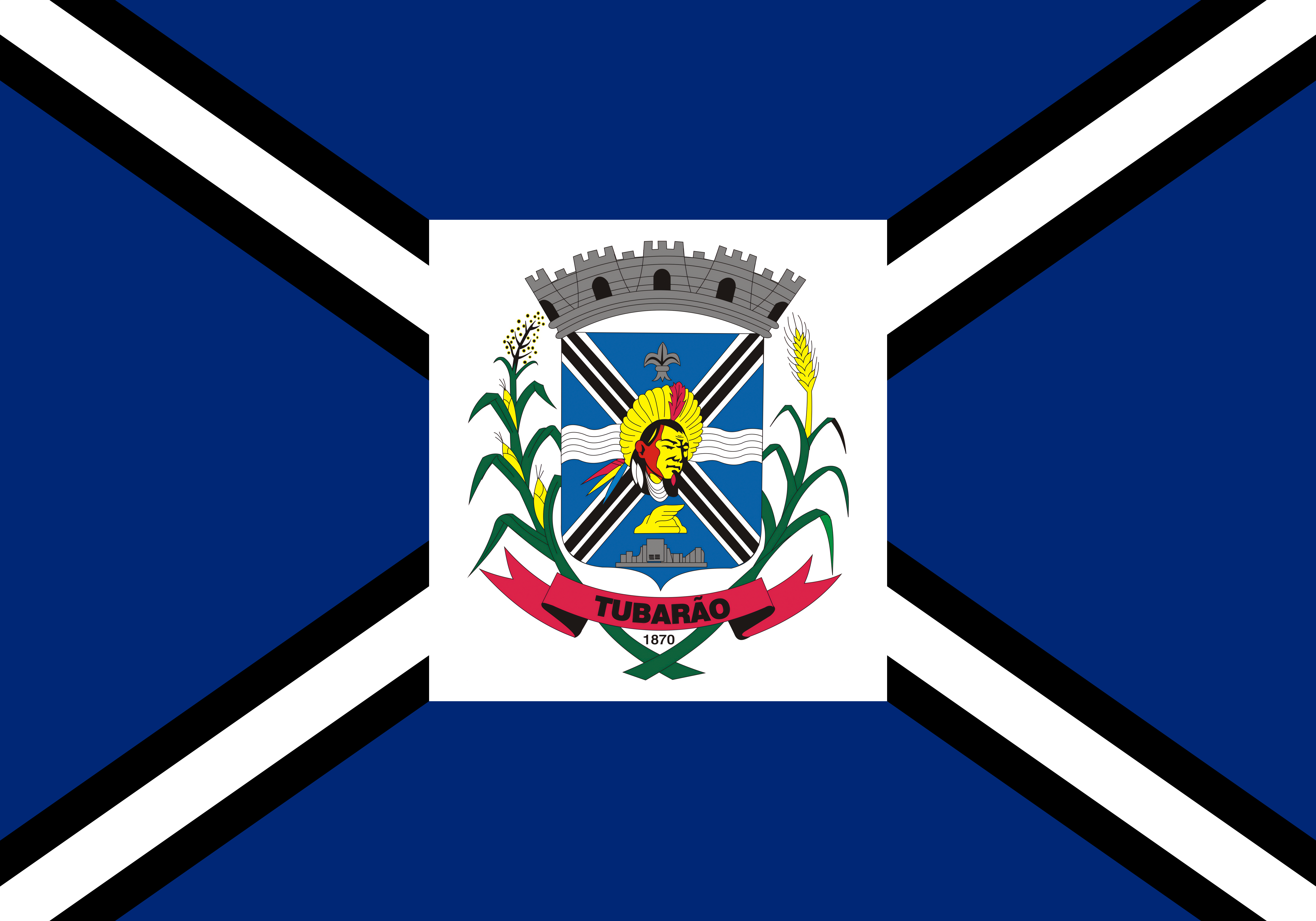
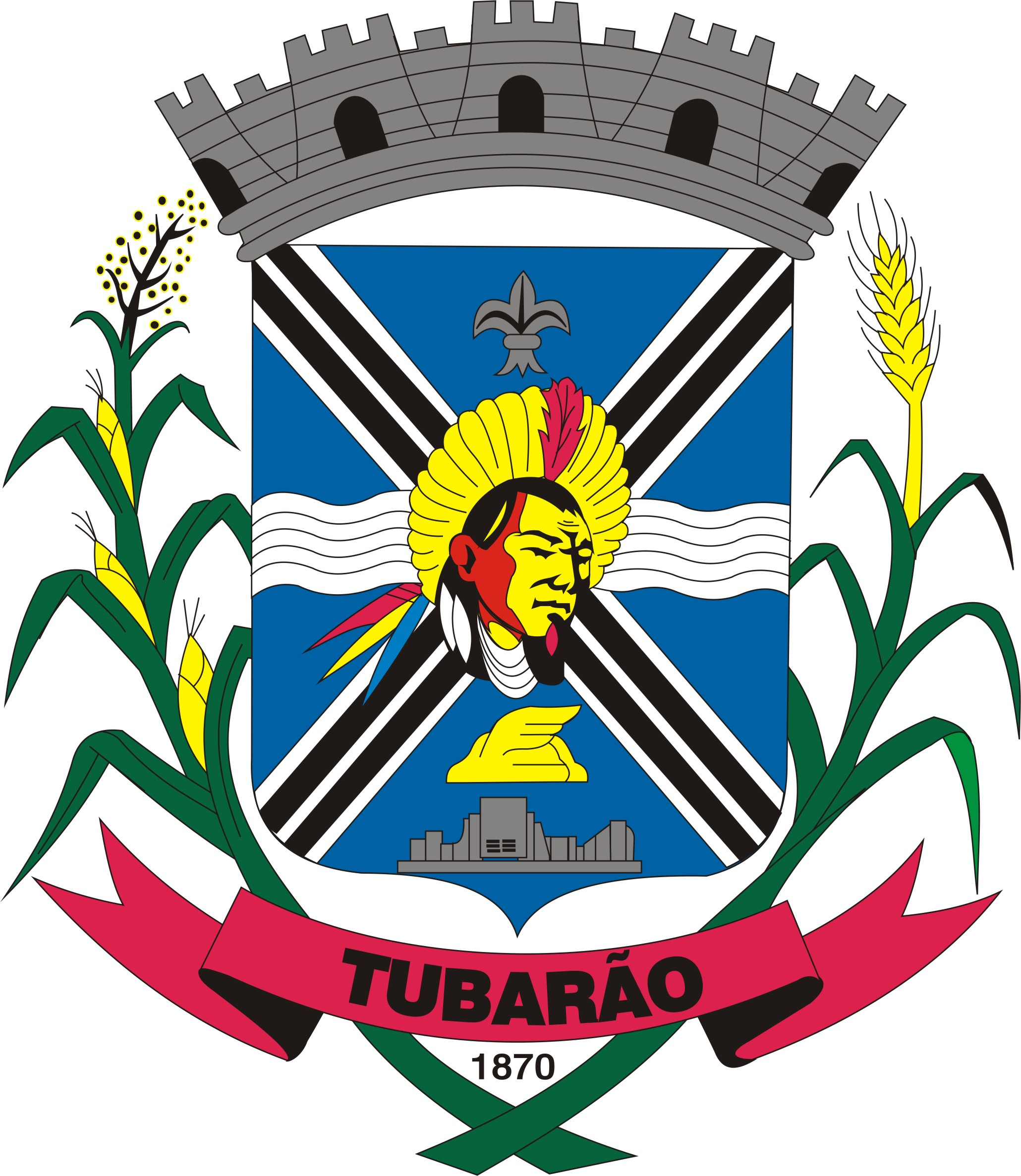
- Flag Coat of arms
- Nickname: Cidade Azul ("Blue city" in Portuguese)
- Location in Santa Catarina Brazil

- Location within Brazil
- Coordinates: 28°28′00″S 49°00′25″W
- Country: Brazil
- Region: South
- State: (Santa Catarina (state)) Santa Catarina
- City emancipation: May 27, 1870

Government
  - Mayor: Estêner Soratto da Silva Júnior (PL)

Area
  - Total: 300.273 km^{2} (115.936 sq mi)
- Elevation: 9 m (30 ft)

Population (2022 Census)
  - Total: 110,088
  - Estimate (2025): 116,725
  - Density: 340.95/km^{2} (883.1/sq mi)
- Time zone: UTC-3 (UTC-3)
  - Summer (DST): UTC-2 (UTC-2)
- Website: www.tubarao.sc.gov.br

Tubarão (lit. "shark") is a Brazilian municipality located in southern part of Santa Catarina state. The population according to the 2022 Census estimate was 110,088. It is the main city of the Tubarão River basin region, which comprises 20 municipalities and has a population of about 350,000.

== History ==
Tubarão was named after a native tribal chief called Tubanharô, which means "ferocious father" in Guaraní language. Thus, it does not have any relation to the word tubarão ("shark" in Portuguese).

The first settlement, which later became the city, was founded in 1773 by troopers as a halfway point between Laguna and the uplands.

Coal was discovered in Tubarão outskirts in the 18th century.

The city emancipated from Laguna in 1870.

In the following years Italian and German immigrants came to this region.

The Tereza Christina Railway was inaugurated in 1884.

One of the worst natural catastrophes in Brazil took place in Tubarão, on March 28, 1974. The Tubarão River waters flooded about 80% of the urban area. The disaster caused 199 fatalities and left about 45,000 people homeless.

== Geography ==
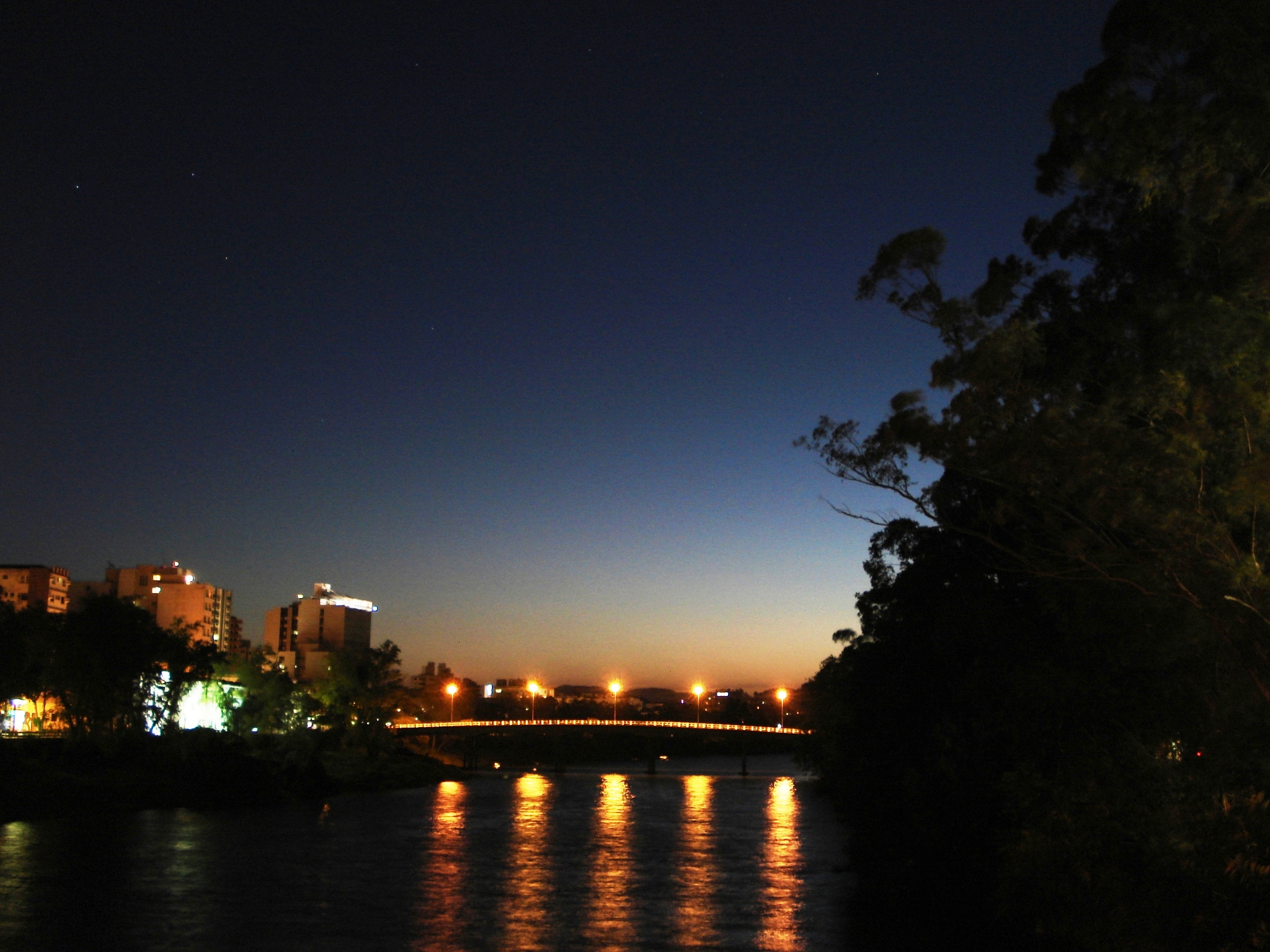
Twilight in Tubarão downtown

The city is located 133 kilometers south of Florianópolis, the state capital, in the South Brazilian coast plains. Its urban area is crossed by the Tubarão River and, in parallel, the BR-101 federal highway. Some lakes and swamp areas are found in the surrounding areas, although its landscape has been modified several times by human activity. The climate is subtropical (Köppen climate classification).

Neighbor cities are Laguna, Capivari de Baixo, Gravatal, Pedras Grandes, Jaguaruna, São Ludgero, Orleans and Treze de Maio.

== Economy ==
The main economy is based on agriculture (rice plantations), furniture industry and ceramic tiles. Tourism is also important due to its thermal water resources in Rio do Pouso and Guarda da Margem Esquerda localities.

== Notable people ==
- Renan Bressan (1988) - soccer player (Belarus national)
- Alberto Cargnin, journalist
- Zenon (1954) - soccer player
- Lucas Rossi Feuerschütte (1990) - YouTuber
- Marquinhos Pedroso - soccer player
- Luiz Felipe, football player
- Marcel Fortuna, mixed martial artist
- Bruno Grassi, football player
- Raul Cabral, brazilian football coach
- Heriberto Hülse (1902–1972) - Governor of Santa Catarina 1958–1961

== Demography ==
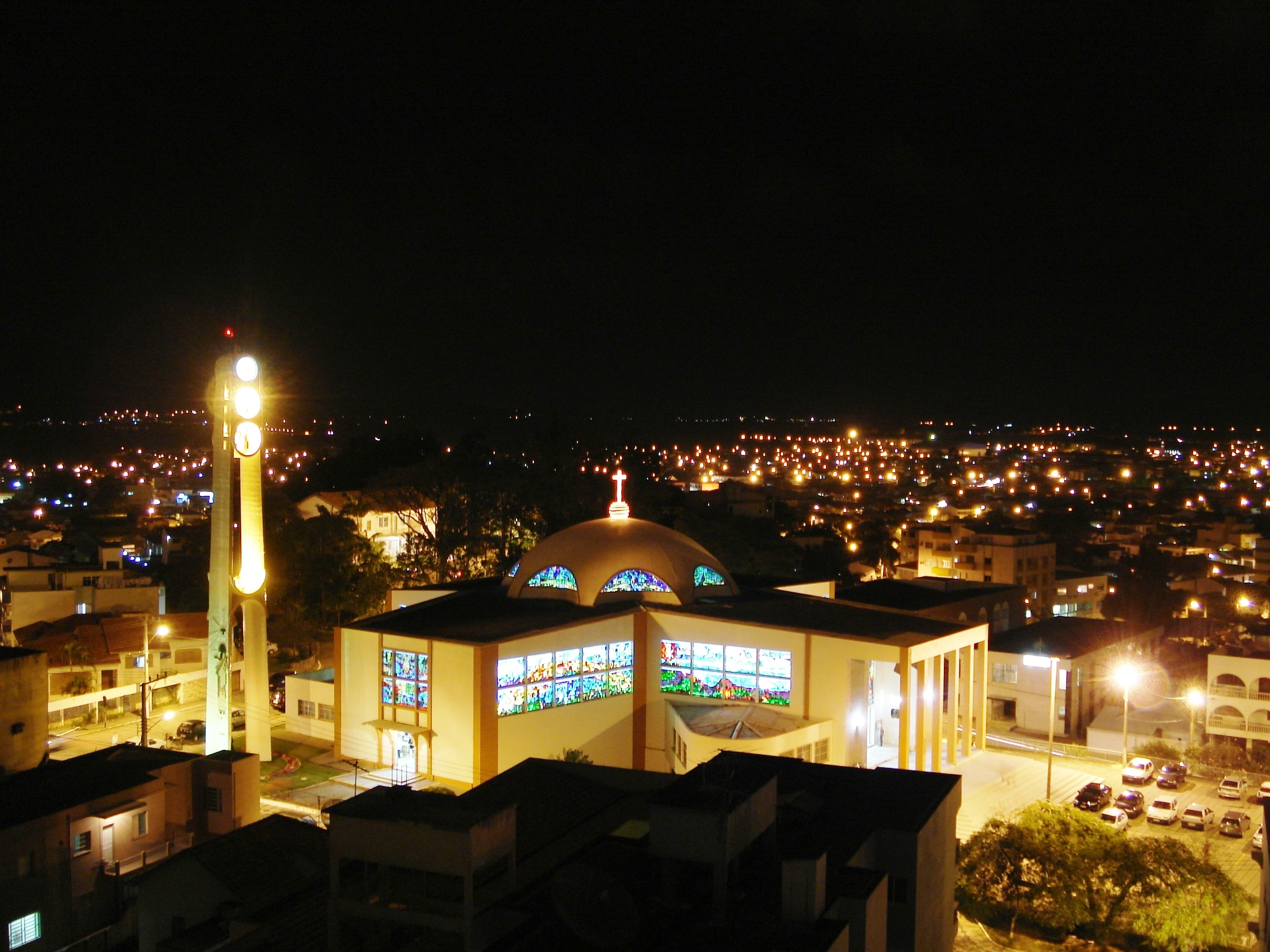
Tubarão's Catholic Cathedral

The main ethnic groups are Portuguese-Azorians, German and Italian descendants and Afro-Brazilians. Tubarão is 12th largest city in the state. The total population (IBGE/2010) was 97,281.

The most illustrious citizen was Willy Zumblick, a painter of German descent. A museum in the downtown area is named after him.

== Sport ==
The local association football teams are Clube Atlético Tubarão and Hercílio Luz Futebol Clube, two of the major teams of southern Santa Catarina.

== See also ==
- Port of Tubarao
- Aikanã, an indigenous people of the Brazil's Amazonian lowlands, also called Tubarão
