= Rio de Janeiro Zoological Garden =

Zoo in Rio de Janeiro, Brazil

Jardim Zoológico do Rio de Janeiro
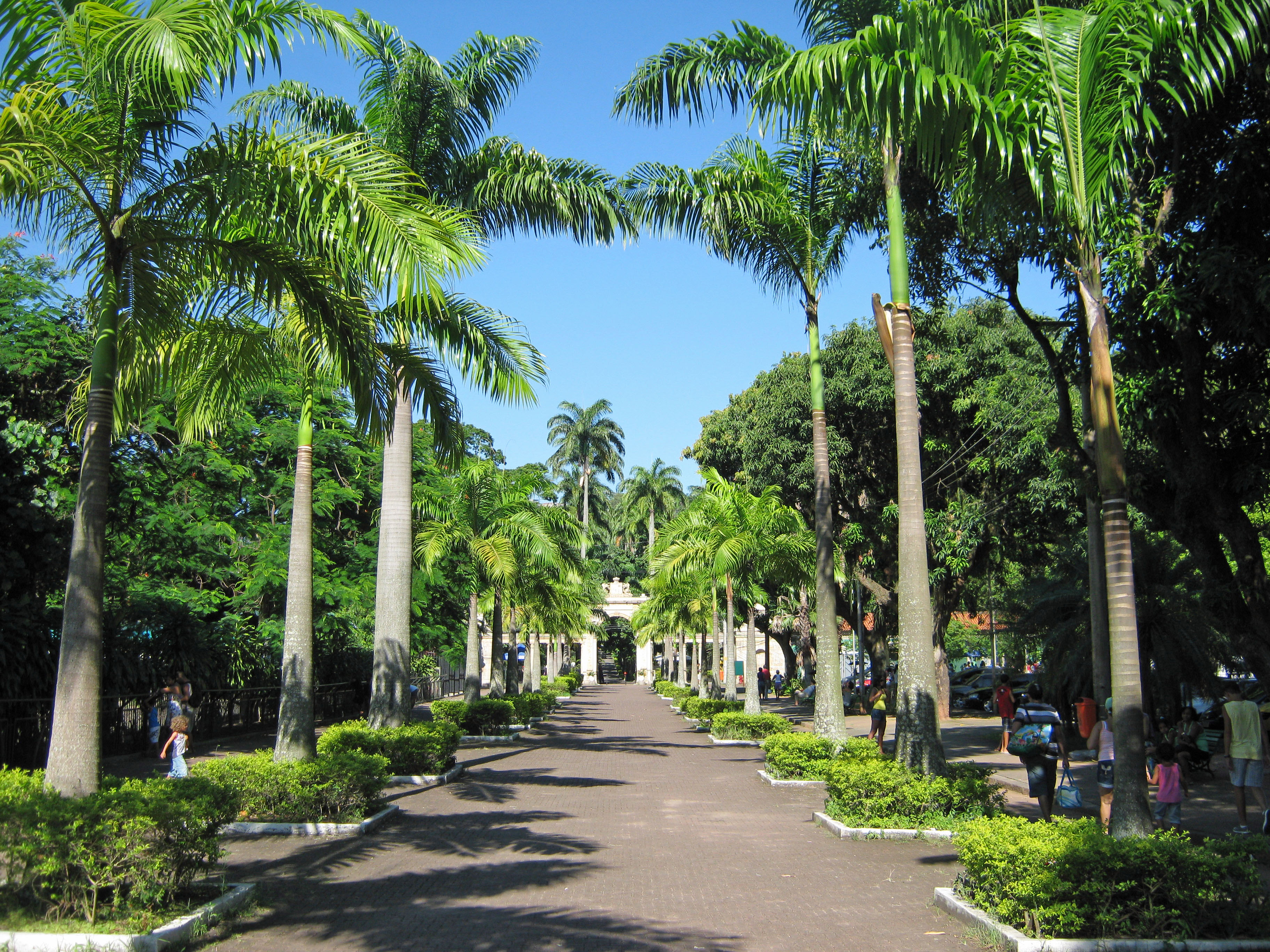
- Entrance Alleyway to the zoo
- Interactive map of Jardim Zoológico do Rio de Janeiro
- Type: Public
- Location: Quinta da Boa Vista s/n, São Cristóvão, Rio de Janeiro, Brazil.
- Coordinates: 22°54′16″S 43°13′46″W
- Area: 55 000 square meters
- Opening: 16 January 1888 (Vila Isabel); 18 March 1945 (Quinta da Boa Vista)
- Administrator: Grupo Cataratas
- Visitors: 70 000 visitors per month

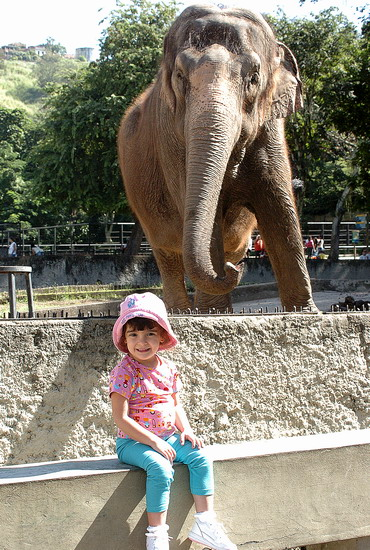
Elephant in Rio de Janeiro Zoo

The Rio de Janeiro Zoological Garden (Portuguese: Jardim Zoológico do Rio de Janeiro) is a zoo located in the district of São Cristóvão, in the municipality of Rio de Janeiro, Brazil. The institution has among its main objectives the development of environmental and educational activities, based on the animals of its collection—which consists mainly of fish, reptiles, birds, and mammals.

The zoo is housed in a 55,000-square-meter park at the back of Quinta da Boa Vista. Its collection currently has over 1,300 animals. There are 350 species, many of them rare and endangered, such as the Lear's macaw, harpy eagle, broad-snouted caiman, maned wolf, golden-headed lion tamarin, anteater and the king vulture. In addition to native species of the Amazon Region, the Pantanal and the Brazilian Cerrado, there are also other animals from other countries, such as the rhinoceros and the American brown bear.

== History ==
The first zoo in Rio was founded in 1870 by João Batista Viana Drummond, Baron of Drummond, in his estate at Vila Isabel neighborhood, with the permission of Emperor Pedro II. To fund his enterprise, he promoted a raffle, selling tickets with pictures of each one of the 25 animals. The baron would select randomly one animal at the closing of the zoo. The winning ticket would get a prize in cash. That game of chance eventually got copied by gamblers, becoming the illegal lottery called jogo do bicho.

The Vila Isabel zoo closed its doors in the 1940s. It was relocated to Quinta da Boa Vista, on 18 March 1945.

On 2019, more than 30,000 pieces of the Imperial Family's past are found during archaeological works on Zoo. Among the finds are many items such as fragments of crockery, cups, plates, cutlery, horseshoes and even buttons and brooches with imperial coat of arms from military clothing. The pieces would belong to National Museum

== Gallery ==
Logo

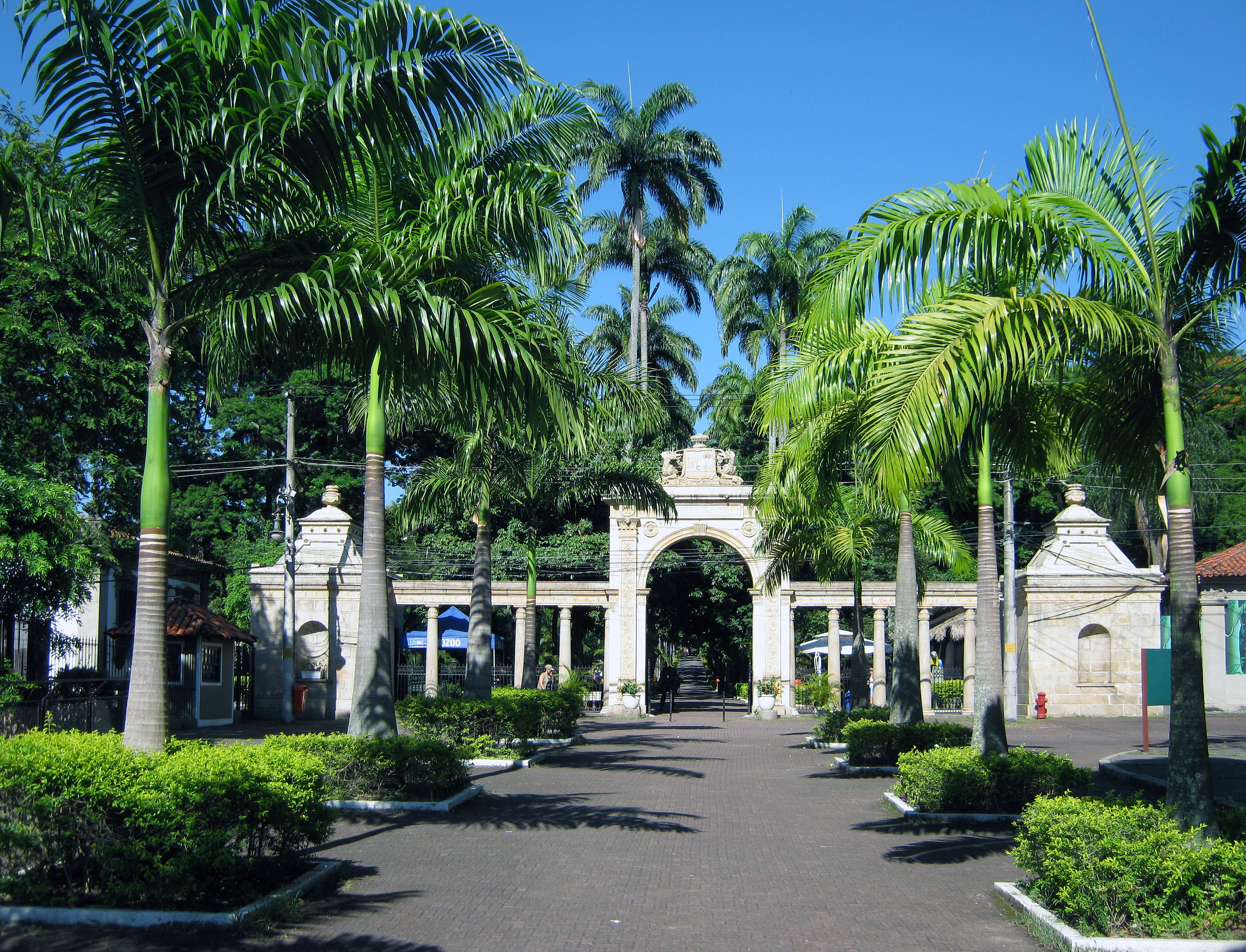
Entrance

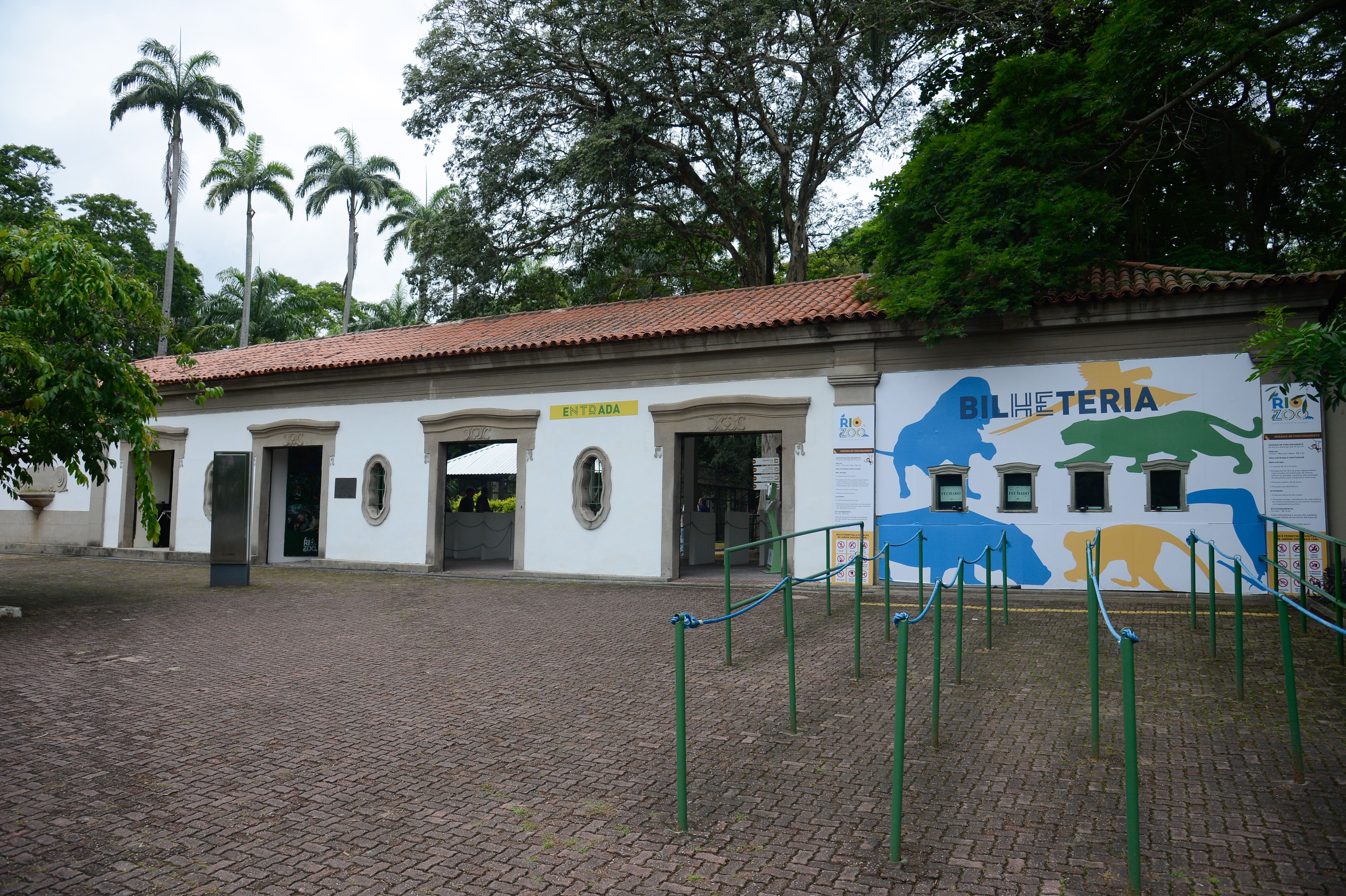
Entrance

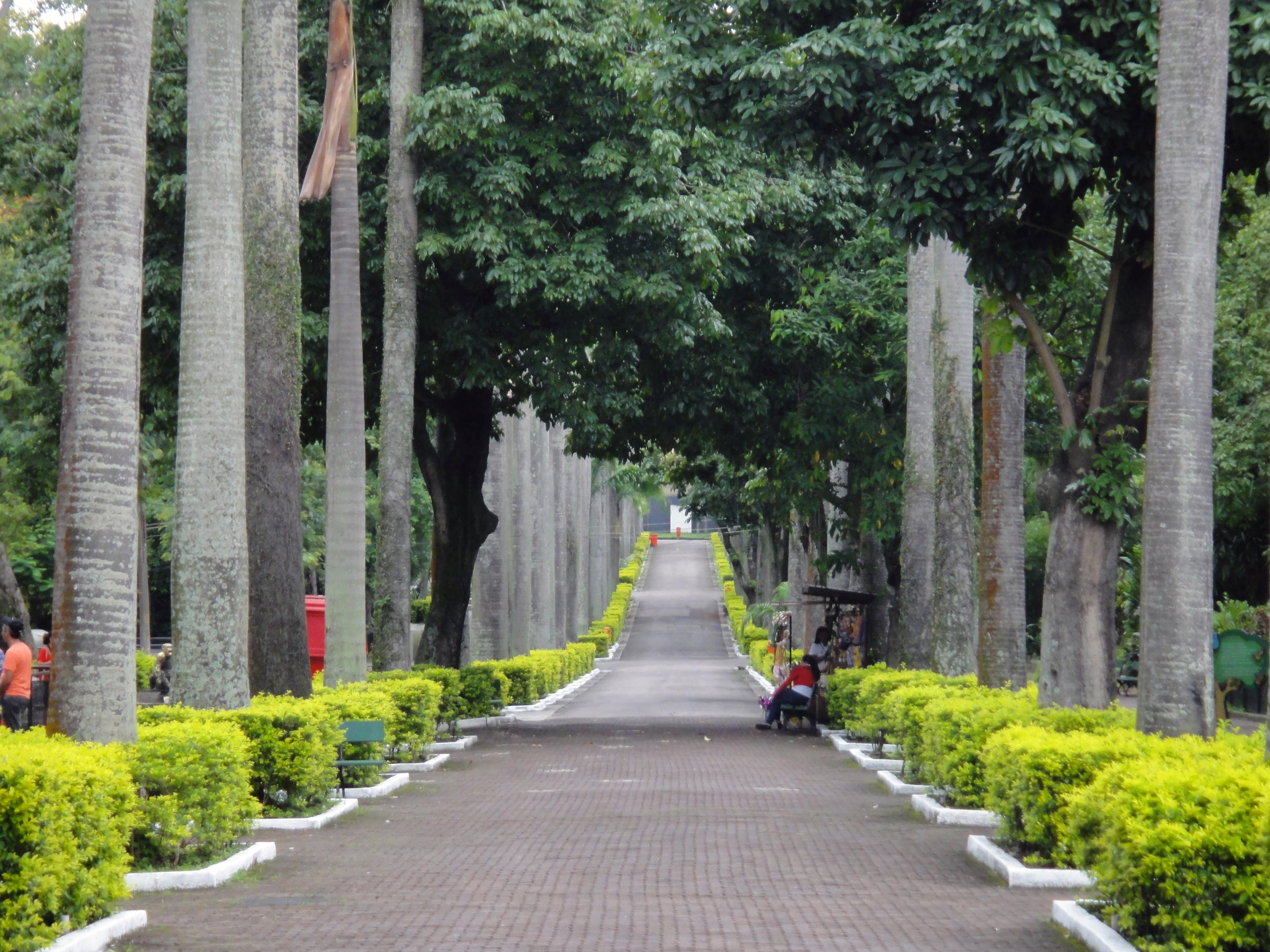
Alley

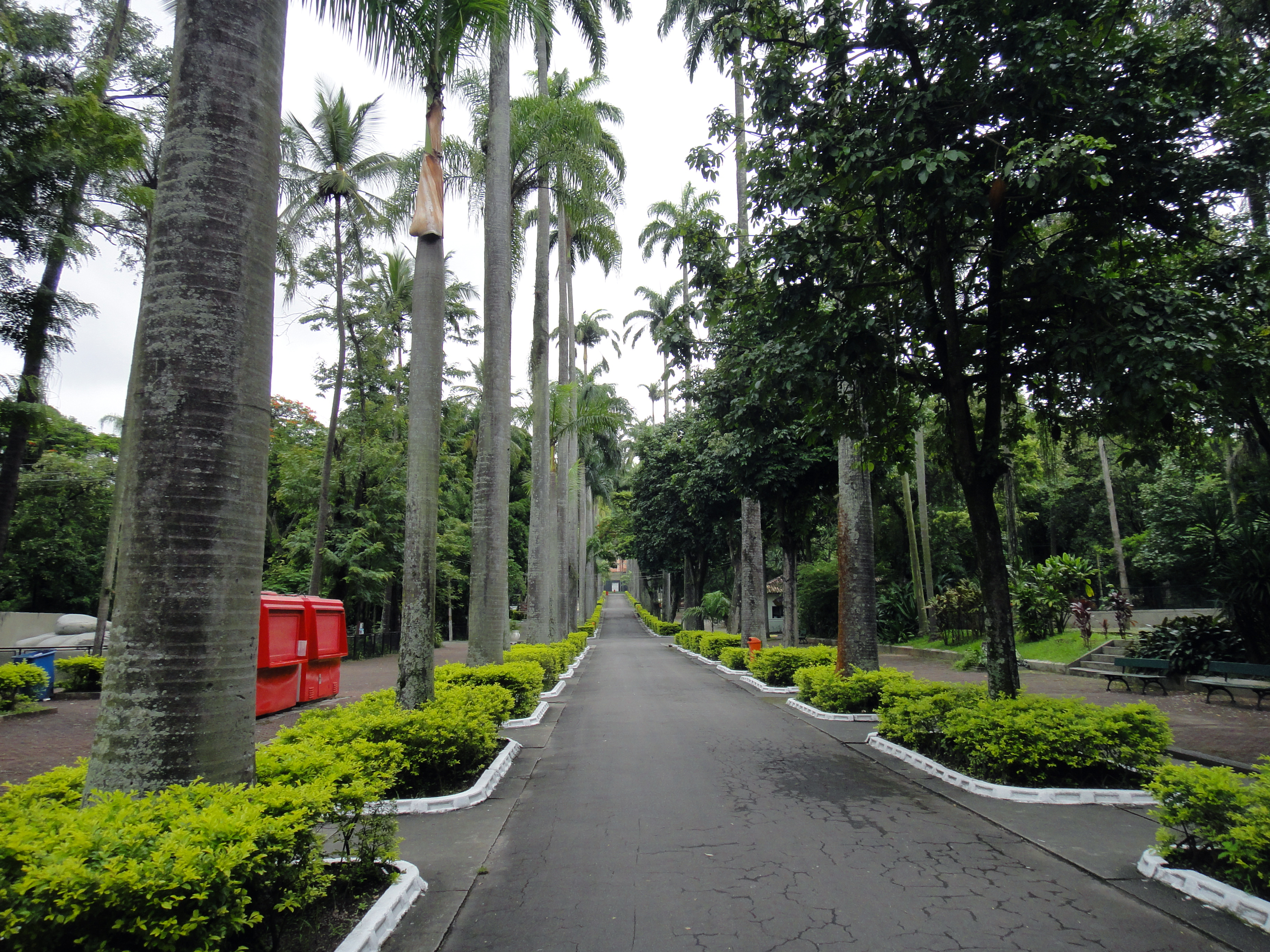
Alley

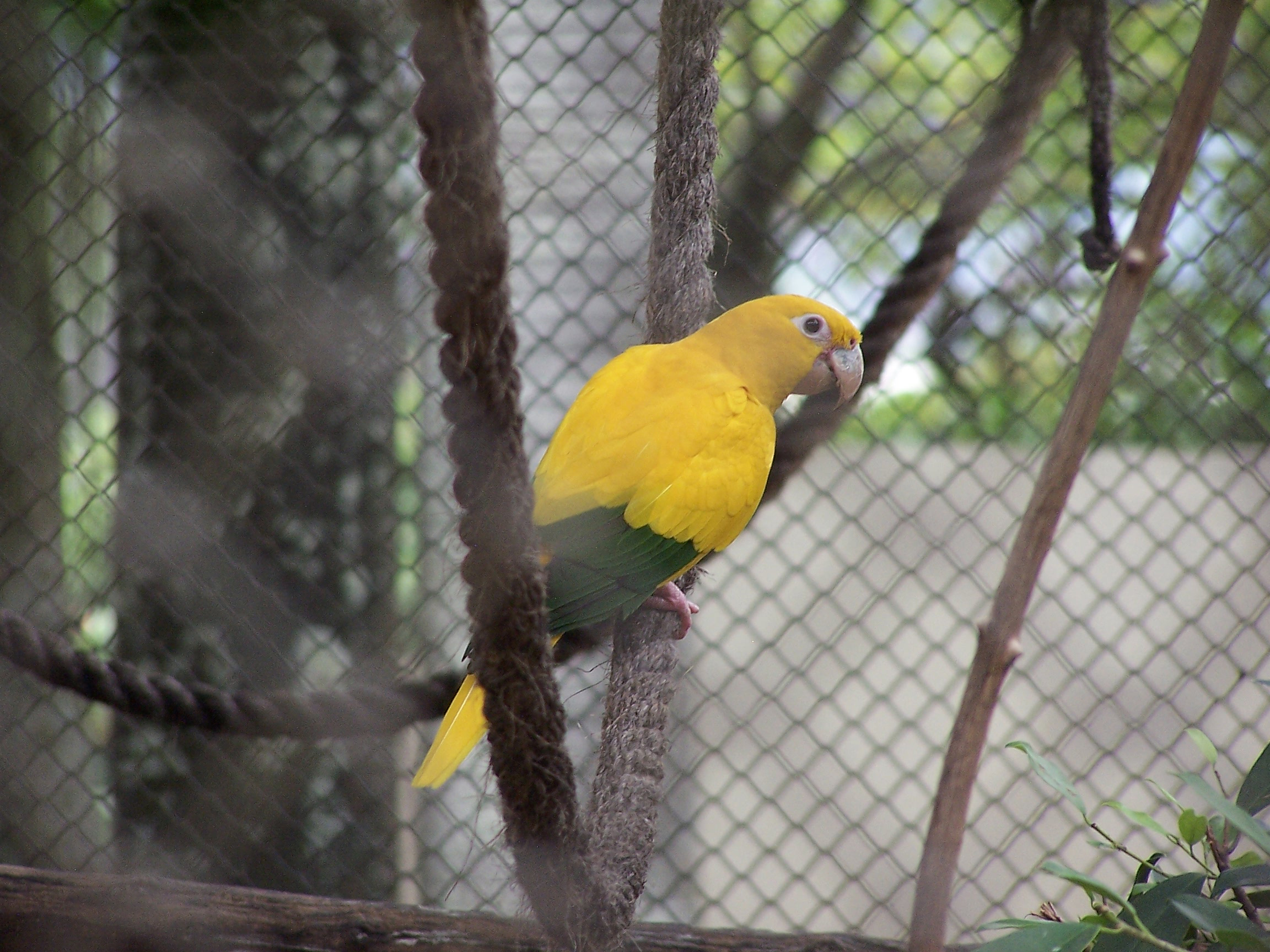
Ararajuba

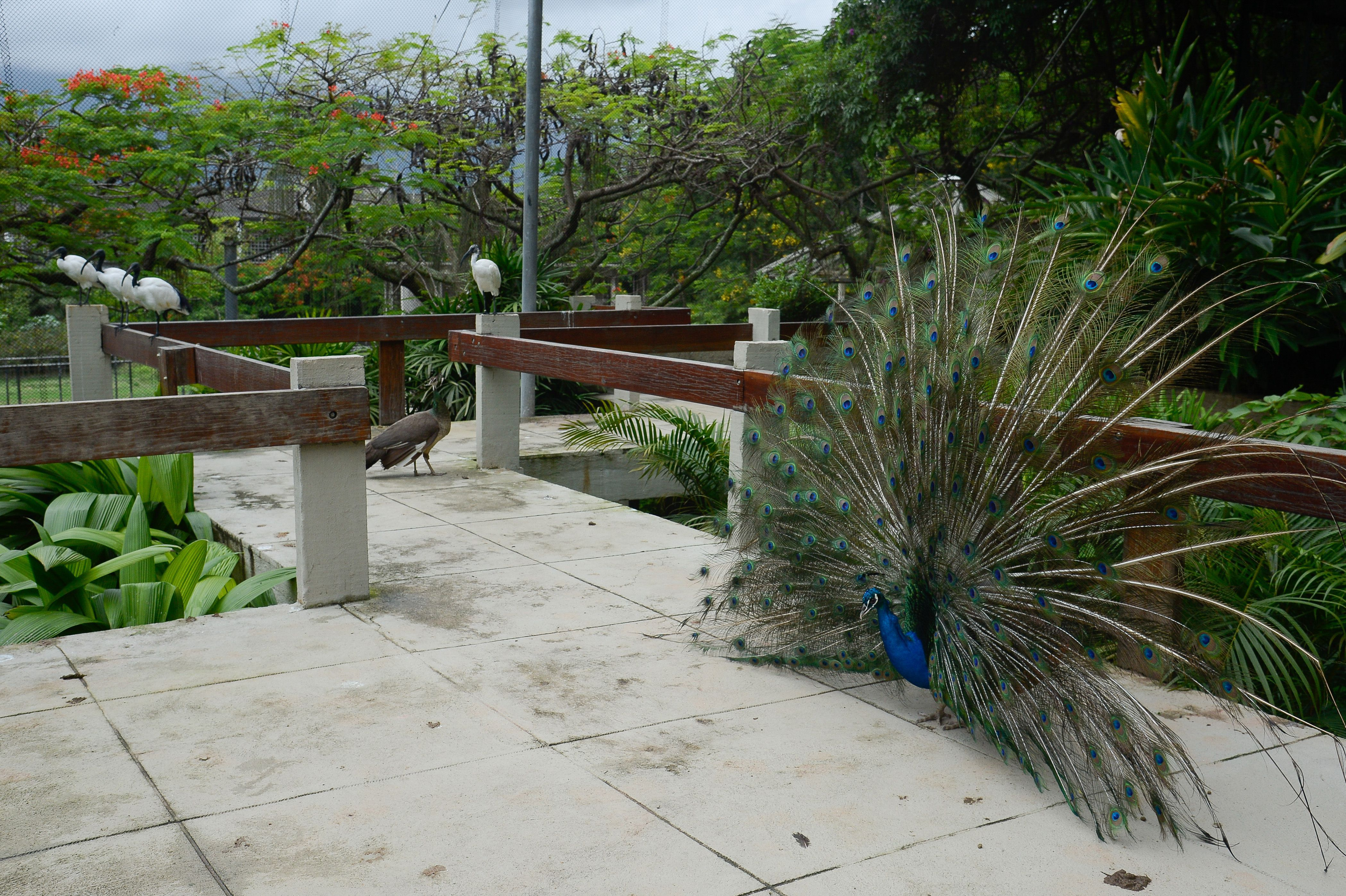
Birds

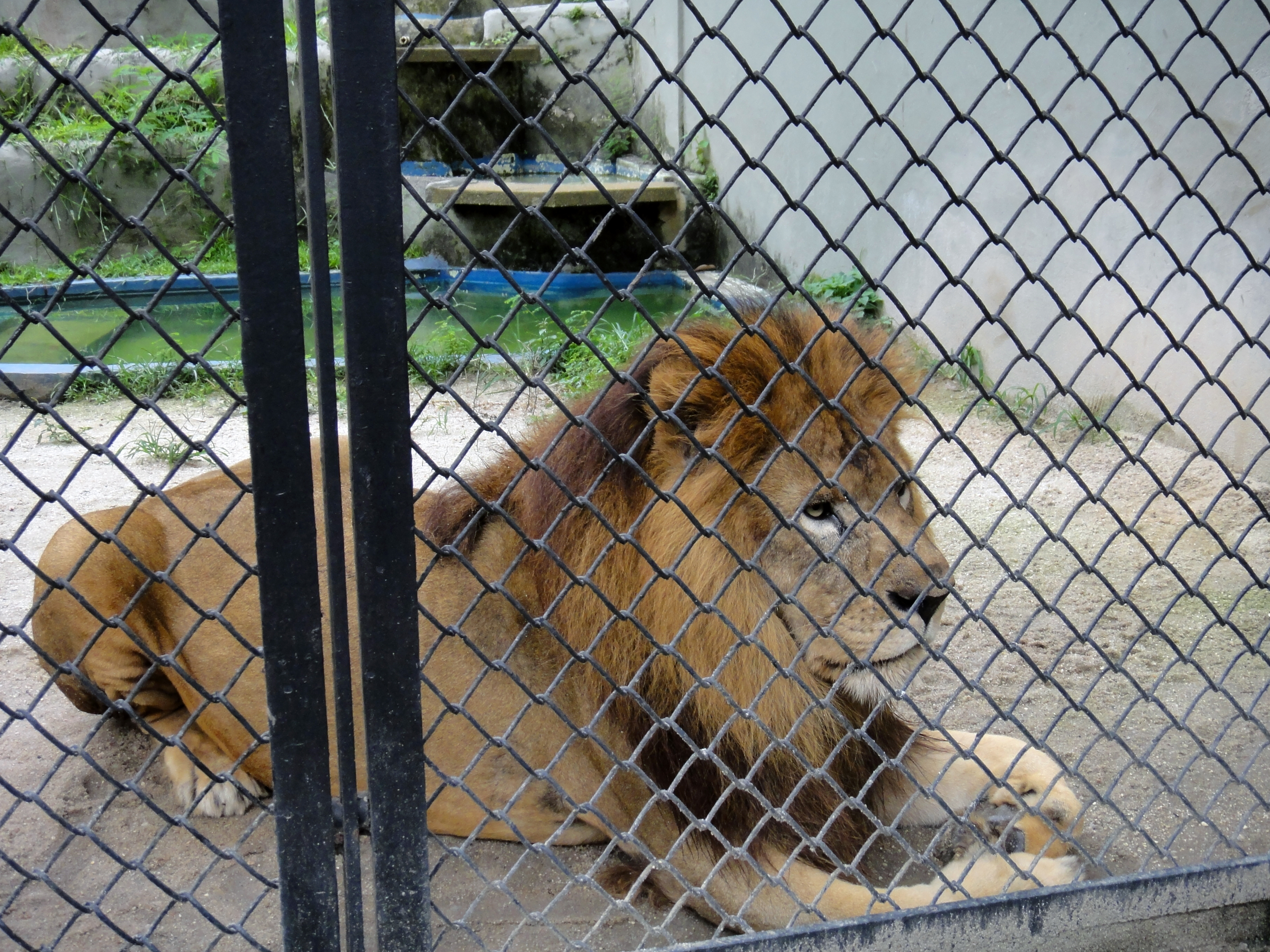
Lion

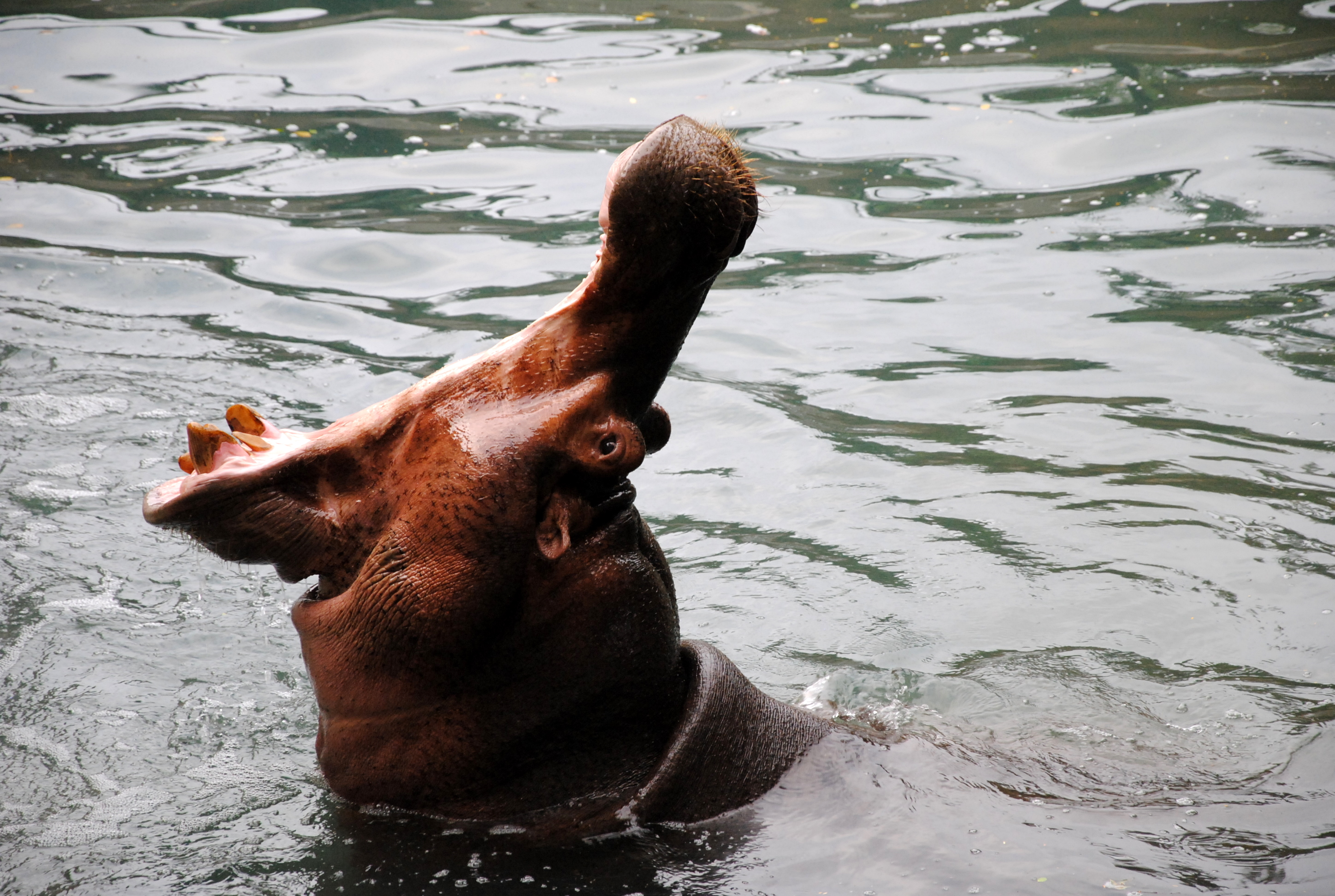
Hippo

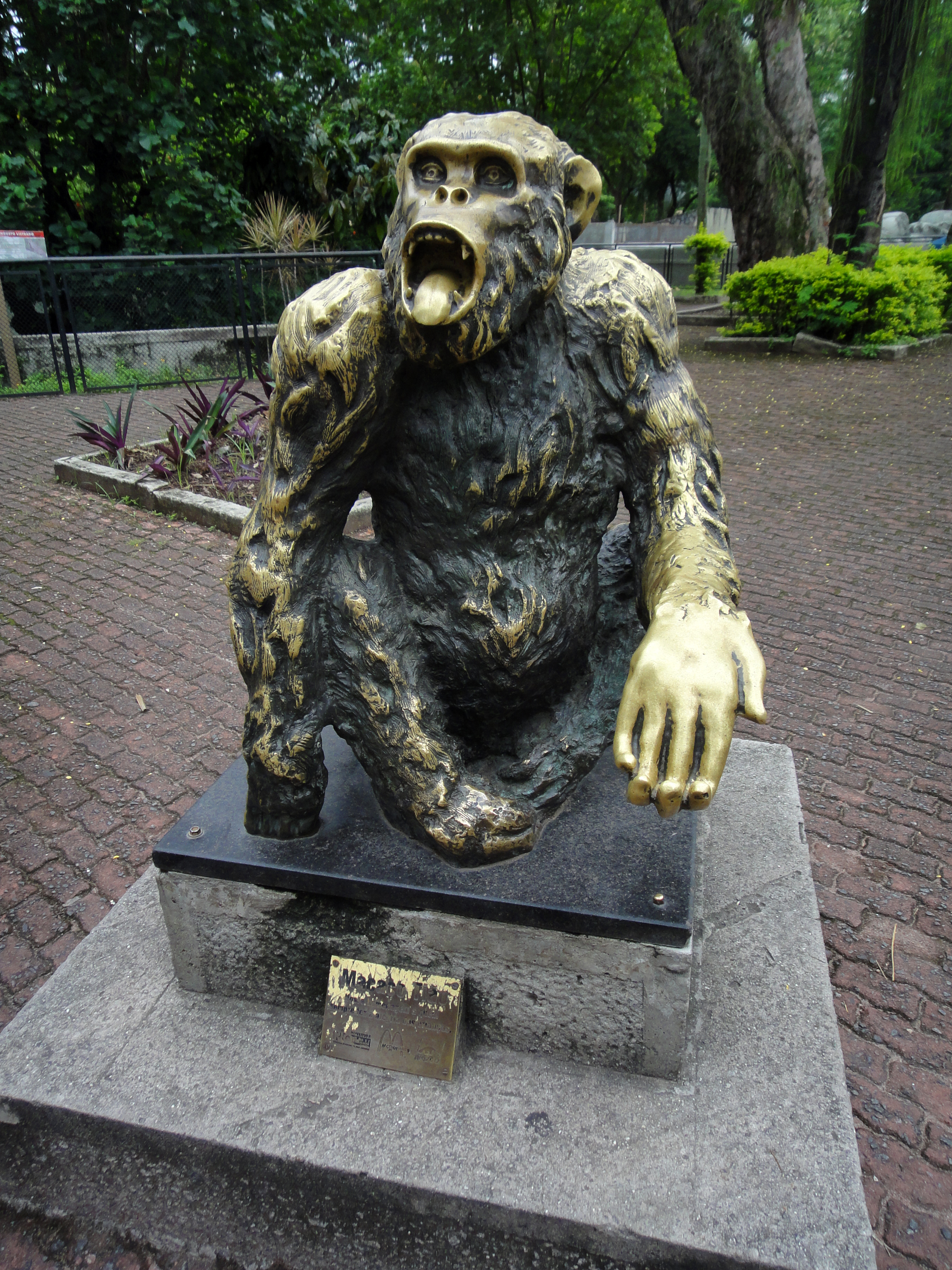
Statue of Macaco Tião

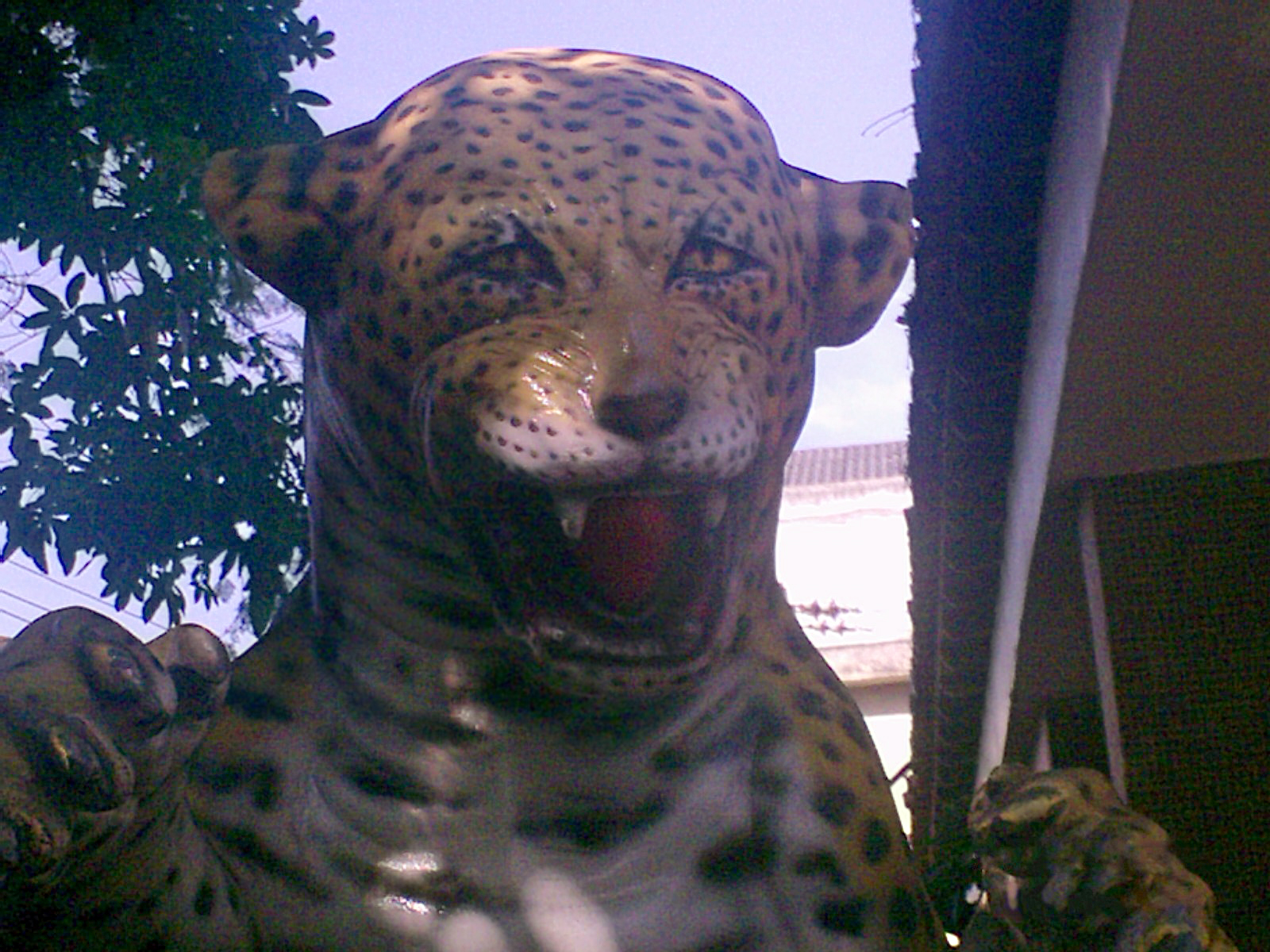
Statue
