= Tubarão River =

River in Brazil

Coordinates: 28°30′10″S 48°47′19″W

The Tubarão River is a river in the Brazilian state of Santa Catarina.

== Geographical aspects ==
It originates from the confluence of the Rocinha river and Bonito river in the municipality of Lauro Müller. The Tubarão River flows from the Serra Geral foothills to the Southern Santa Catarina Lagoon System, 75 miles (121 km) away. The main tributaries are the Braço do Norte river, Capivari river, Laranjeiras river and Congonhas river by the left bank and the Palmeiras river and Azambuja river by the right bank. The major tributary, the Braço do Norte river is, actually, larger than the Tubarão River.

The Tubarão River basin drains an area of 2,177 square miles (5,640 km^{2}) in 20 municipalities comprising a population of about 350,000 people

== Anthropical facts ==
=== Human occupation ===
The first human beings to occupy these areas were Sambaqui people circa 5,000 years ago. These peoples lived in the southern Brazilian coast for thousand years and vanished. This very day, it is a mystery their disappearance. They left huge middens as vestiges. Circa the year 1000 AD, Guaraní people settled in this same regions previously occupied by the Sambaqui people. The first European to disembark in the Tubarão River were Portuguese missionaries in 1605. They found Guarani tribes livings near the banks. These Jesuits were antagonized by a tribal chief called Tub-Nharô, which means Ferocious Father in the Guarani language. The Jesuits named the river after the chief, however they changed the name's orthography to Tubarão, which means shark in the Portuguese Language and has a similar pronunciation. By the 1740s, a few adventurers, slave traders and missionaries lived in this region. In those years the Portuguese Empire brought some Azorian families to colonize Southern Brazil. In the later decades of the 1700s the river had important function as a fluvial way linking the Laguna harbor to a small river harbor that connected to the trooper's way to the uplands. This small river harbor became decades later the city of Tubarão. In the 1800s, troopers found mineral coal near the banks and the mining operations started in 1884 when the Dona Thereza Christina Railway was inaugurated. In this same period huge mass of Italians and German immigrants settled in the basin. In 1887 and 1974, floods destroyed the cities on the banks, Tubarão was the most affected.

=== Environmental problems ===
The basin has suffered intense environmental degradation since the first coal mine works in the 1880s. This works were made without any environmental or social prudence. The low quality coal produces too many reject material, which was continuously throw away in areas near the Tubarão tributary rivers. The European settlements had their first economy based on familiar agriculture. Poor land practices contributed to the deforestation and consequently soil erosion and sedimentation of the watercourses. The World War II breakout increased the coal mining significantly. It also changed the social-economical relations, the population growth and industries related to this new ascension economy. On the other hand, the environmental and life-quality degradation was in the negative balance. After the 1974 flood, the Tubarão river was deeply modified. Levees were built along its banks on the low areas and the river had its course rectified eliminating about 2 miles (3.2 km) of its meanders.
