= Tião (dolphin) =

Brazilian dolphin

Tião (Portuguese pronunciation: [tʃiɐ̃w̃]) was a solitary male bottlenose dolphin that was first spotted in the town of São Sebastião in Brazil around 1994 and frequently allowed humans to interact with him, having a particular preference to interacting with female humans. The dolphin later killed a swimmer and injured many others, which later earned him the nickname killer dolphin.

The dolphin first started to receive public attention in March 1994, when he started to visit the ferry pier almost daily, frequently following boats. The locals named him Tião, which is a common nickname for the Portuguese male given name Sebastião. The name was a reference to the town in which he was first spotted. After several months, the animal moved north to a local beach, where he frequently got close to bathers and interacted with them. Tião quickly became popular and on occasion over thirty people would be in the water with the dolphin at the same time, sometimes trying to grab hold of his pectoral and dorsal fins to have him drag them through the water. Harassment of the dolphin started to take ever more serious forms, from people attempting to restrain the dolphin to have their picture taken with him, to trying to stick an ice cream cone in his blowhole and attempting to pour beer into his mouth.

Tião started to resist the harassment and by November 1994, 28 people had been taken to hospital. When in December 1994 two male swimmers, Wilson Reis Pedroso and João Paulo Moreira, were harassing and possibly attempting to restrain Tião, in a beach of Caraguatatuba, the dolphin broke the ribs of Pedroso and killed Moreira, who was later found to be drunk. After this incident, the dolphin briefly left but returned to the beach in January 1995. In order to prevent retaliation, a public education campaign was set up. Tião remained at the town for a few more months but finally left for good during the summer of that year, most likely having rejoined a pod, though some still speculate he may have been killed out of revenge.

== See also ==
- List of individual cetaceans
- Macaco Tião
