= Casseta & Planeta =

Brazilian comedy group

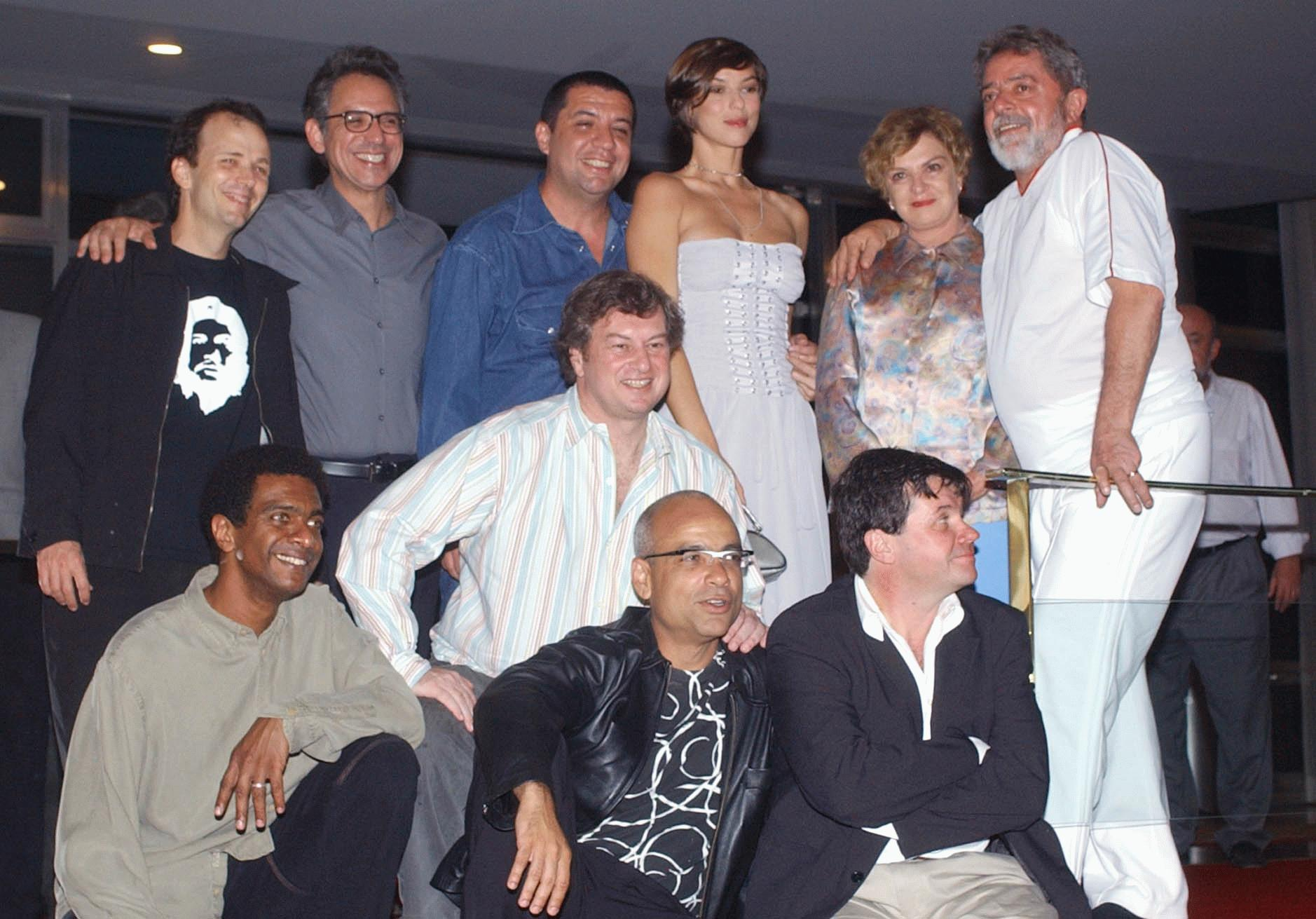
- Casseta & Planeta with Brazilian President Luiz Inácio Lula da Silva in 2003

Comedy career
- Years active: 1992–2011
- Medium: Television; Film; Audio
- Genres: Satire; Surreal humour; Black comedy; Sketch comedy
- Former members: Hubert; Beto Silva; Claudio Manoel; Helio de la Peña; Marcelo Madureira; Reinaldo; Bussunda

Casseta & Planeta is a Brazilian group of comedians who ran a TV show named Casseta & Planeta Urgente, broadcast by Rede Globo between 1992 and 2011. The humour featured on the show is mostly sketches, relating to broad Brazilian pop culture subjects (soap opera, political satire, regional stereotypes, and others).

The group founded a company called Toviassu Produções Artísticas ("Toviassu Artistic Productions"), whose name is an acronym composed of syllables from the phrase "Todo viado é surdo" – "Every faggot is deaf"; which is the ending of a widely known Brazilian practical joke. Each one of the seven members has a specific function within the company. They present their TV show at Rede Globo and publish a website and many books, among other products, for example the "Machobol" (a parody of frescobol which is a game similar to tennis played in Brazilian beaches).

Originally a magazine named Casseta Popular and a humour newspaper called O Planeta Diário (in a nod to Clark Kent's Daily Planet), the two teams joined forces in 1988, first to promote a comedic mayoral candidacy for a chimpanzee, and later were hired by Rede Globo to become writers for the network's comedy shows, starting with TV Pirata. A few years later, they starred in their own show.

== Members ==
- Beto Silva
- Bussunda (died June 17, 2006 as a victim of a heart attack, while covering the World Cup in Germany)
- Cláudio Manuel
- Hélio de la Peña
- Hubert
- Marcelo Madureira
- Reinaldo Figueiredo
- Maria Paula (sometimes considered the 8th member, at least for the TV show)
- Mú Chebabi (the group's music producer and main composer)

== TV Pirata ==
In April 1988, Rede Globo premiered a new weekly comedy series on their Tuesday prime time slot called "TV Pirata" (Pirate TV). The show was written by Casseta Popular and Planeta Diáro writers and consisted of a new approach in Brazilian comedy with sketches spoofing pop culture, Brazilian society and social life, "novelas" (soap operas), politics, celebrities and others with a fresh no-nonsense style of comedy (borrowing from Saturday Night Live and Monty Python's Flying Circus); This style of sketch comedy was considered fresh and groundbreaking for Brazilian audiences who weren't accustomed to such an approach. The show gained audience slowly, until it became a cultural phenomenon. The program also featured dramatic actors like Debora Bloch, Marco Nanini, Cláudia Raia and Ney Latorraca in comedic roles instead of the dramatic roles they usually performed. Some of the performers, however, went on to play more comedy roles later in their careers. The show ended in 1990, due to various cast changes as well as declines in ratings; It was revived briefly in early 1992, being cancelled for good just a few months later. The TV show, however, became a cult and a landmark in Brazilian comedy as there has never been a show like it before or since.
