= Bussunda =

Brazilian comedian

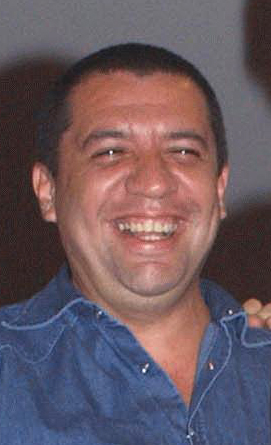
- Born: Cláudio Besserman Vianna; June 25, 1962; Rio de Janeiro, RJ, Brazil
- Died: June 17, 2006 (aged 43); Vaterstetten, Bavaria, Germany
- Occupations: Journalist; sports chronist; magazine editor; actor; writer; humourist; comedian; voice actor
- Years active: 1981–2006
- Spouse: Angélica Nascimento (m. 1989)
- Children: Júlia Besserman (1993–)
- Parents: Luís Guilherme Viana (father); Helena Besserman Viana (mother)
- Relatives: Sérgio Besserman Viana (brother)

Cláudio Besserman Vianna (June 25, 1962 — June 17, 2006), commonly known as Bussunda (Portuguese pronunciation: [buˈsũdɐ]), was a Brazilian humorist and TV comedian, member of the Casseta & Planeta troupe. He was born in Rio de Janeiro, where he lived and worked, having started his career in the 1980s as a writer for satirical magazine Casseta Popular. One of the most popular Brazilian comedians of his generation, the overweight Bussunda was famous for his impersonations of football striker Ronaldo and of Brazil's president Lula. He also did the voice of Shrek in the Brazilian Portuguese version of Shrek and Shrek 2. He was of Jewish descent.

== Nickname ==
"Bussunda" is said to have been derived from his school nickname "Besserman Sujismundo" ("Filthy Besserman"), since his parents and friends say he wasn't very fond of taking baths; it was a reference to "Sujismundo", a character used in a government-run educational campaign about urban pollution in the early 1970s - the term "sujismundo" is a combination of words "sujo" (dirty) and "imundo" (filthy). Besserman also said the word was a contraction of "two of my favorite things, but don't call me 'Bundeta'" (reference to "buceta" and "bunda" – in Portuguese, vulgar slang for vagina and buttocks respectively), though this meaning is assumed to be a backronym.

== Death ==
Bussunda died of a heart attack in a hotel in the neighbourhood of Parsdorf in Vaterstetten, a suburb of Munich, Germany, where some members of Casseta & Planeta accompanied the Brazil national team at the World Cup, for a series of TV shows.

His body was flown from Germany back to Rio de Janeiro, where funeral services were held at the C.R. Flamengo gymnasium (Bussunda had been a long-time fan of Flamengo and often used his celebrity status to promote the club). He is buried at the São João Batista cemetery in Rio.

Almost every TV show and magazine in Brazil paid a tribute to Bussunda. The special Casseta & Planeta episode dedicated to him reportedly had the best ratings of the show's history.

The city of Rio de Janeiro named the main street of the Pan-American village "Av. Cláudio Besserman Vianna" after the comedian, and a public school also received his name.

In May 2010, a biography about Bussunda was released in Brazil. The book, written by Guilherme Fiuza, was titled Bussunda - A vida do Casseta.

On June 16, 2021, a docuseries titled Meu Amigo Bussunda following Bussunda's life and career was released on Globoplay.
