= Macaco Tião =

Brazilian chimpanzee (1963-1996)

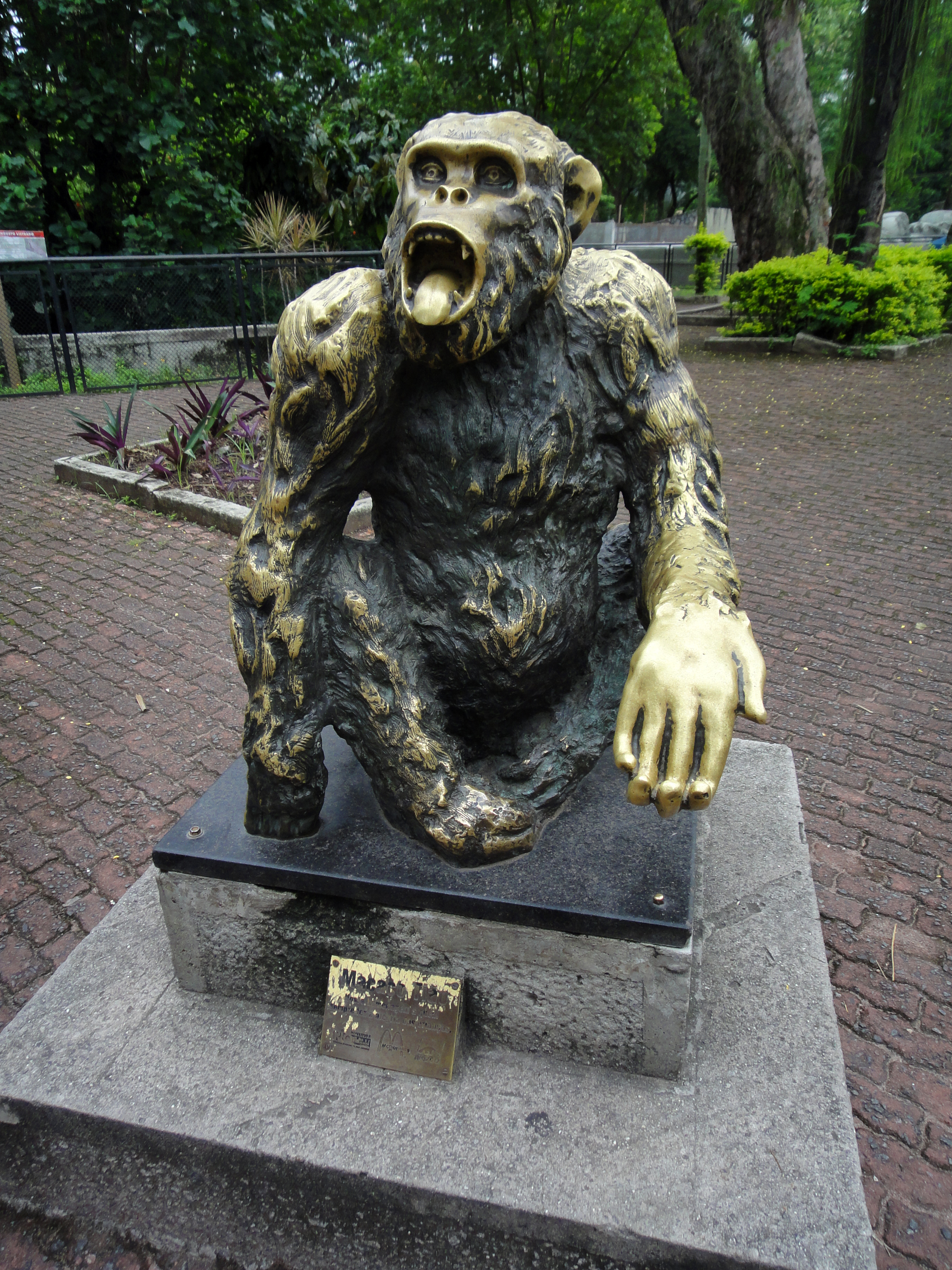
- Monument to Macaco Tião in Rio de Janeiro's Zoo
- Species: Common chimpanzee
- Sex: Male
- Born: January 16, 1963; Rio de Janeiro, Brazil
- Died: December 23, 1996 (aged 33); Rio de Janeiro, Brazil
- Cause of death: Diabetes
- Known for: Being a candidate for mayor
- Residence: Rio de Janeiro Zoological Garden, Rio de Janeiro, Brazil
- Weight: 70 kg (150 lb)
- Height: 1.52 m (5 ft 0 in)

Macaco Tião ("Tião the Monkey") (January 16, 1963 – December 23, 1996) was a chimpanzee of the Rio de Janeiro Zoological Garden who was very popular with children and visitors.

His name ("Tião", a nickname for "Sebastião") is in memory of Rio de Janeiro's patron saint, Saint Sebastian (São Sebastião). He was 1.52 metres (5 ft 0 in) tall and weighed 70 kilograms (150 lb).

== History ==
Tião started to become popular in the 1980s for his temperament, regarded as constant "bad mood" and having the habit of throwing mud and feces on the visitors of the zoo, especially politicians such as Marcello Alencar.

Tião became a celebrity in Brazil, when in 1988, the comedians who ran newspapers Casseta Popular and Planeta Diário (who would later join forces as Casseta & Planeta), jokingly created his extra official candidature for mayor as a protest in defence of null voting. At the time, voting was written on papers instead of registered using voting machines. It is estimated that more than 400,000 ballots were cast for him, and he reached third place in an election with 12 candidates. Because of that, he is now on the Guinness World Records as the most voted chimpanzee in the world. As Tião was not a registered candidate, all his ballots were considered as null. In 1996, the voting system in Brazil was changed to electronic machines, so votes could no longer be cast for non-registered candidates.

Macaco Tião had always attracted enormous attention and had a special place in the zoo, built especially for him.

Nationally famous, various Brazilian newspapers and the French Le Monde reported the news of his death, in December, 23 of 1996. Tião died of diabetes at the age of 33. The city of Rio de Janeiro declared official mourning of three days, with the flags of Rio de Janeiro's Zoo being flown at half-staff. His body was taken to the primate center of the state of Rio de Janeiro (Centro de Primatologia do Estado do Rio de Janeiro - CPRJ), in the Guapimirim city, where his skeleton is preserved.

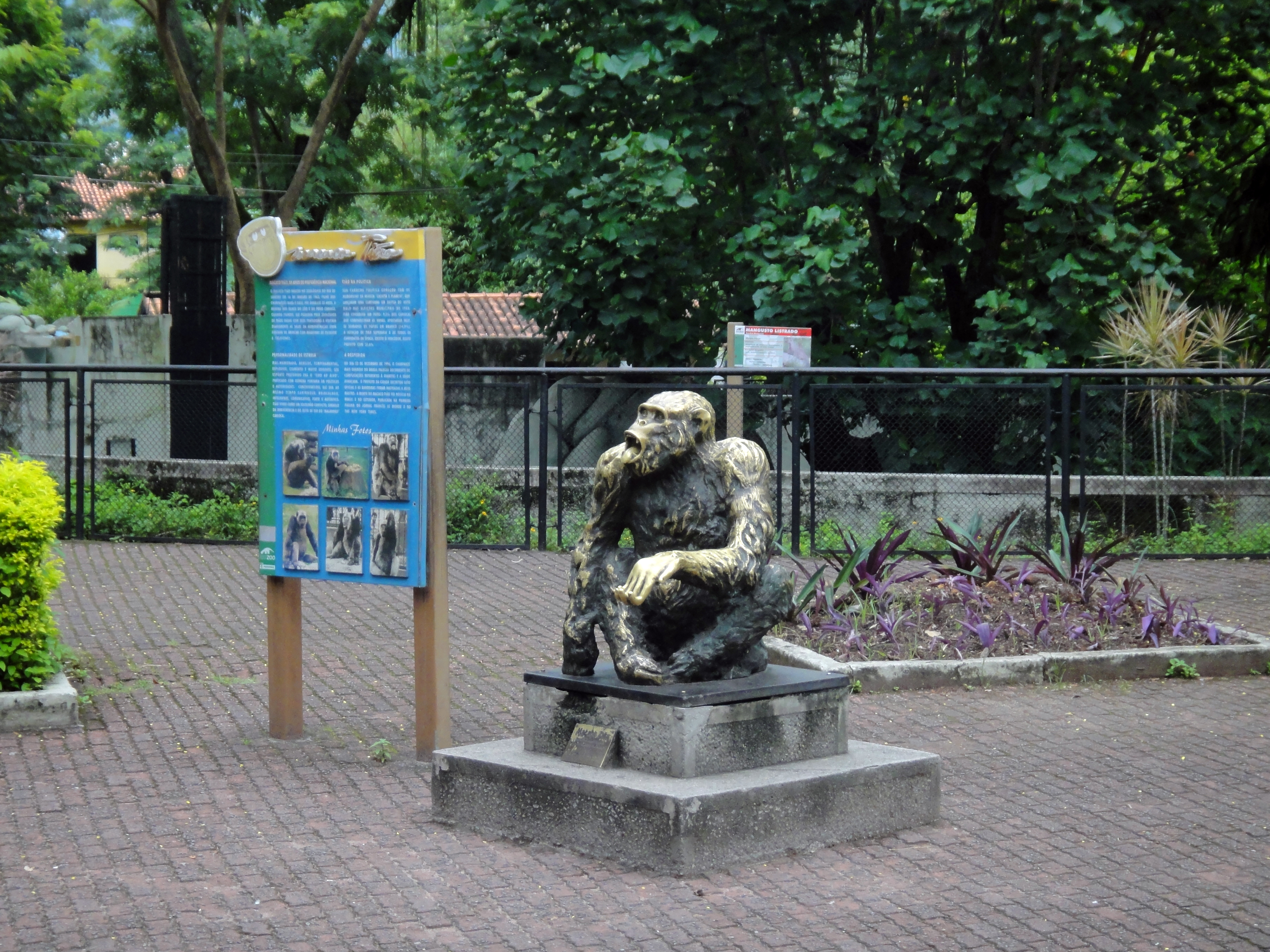
Statue of Macaco Tião (Tião the Ape) in the Zoological Garden of Rio de Janeiro

== See also ==
- List of individual apes
- Tião (dolphin)
