= MOBRAL =

Dictatorship literacy method

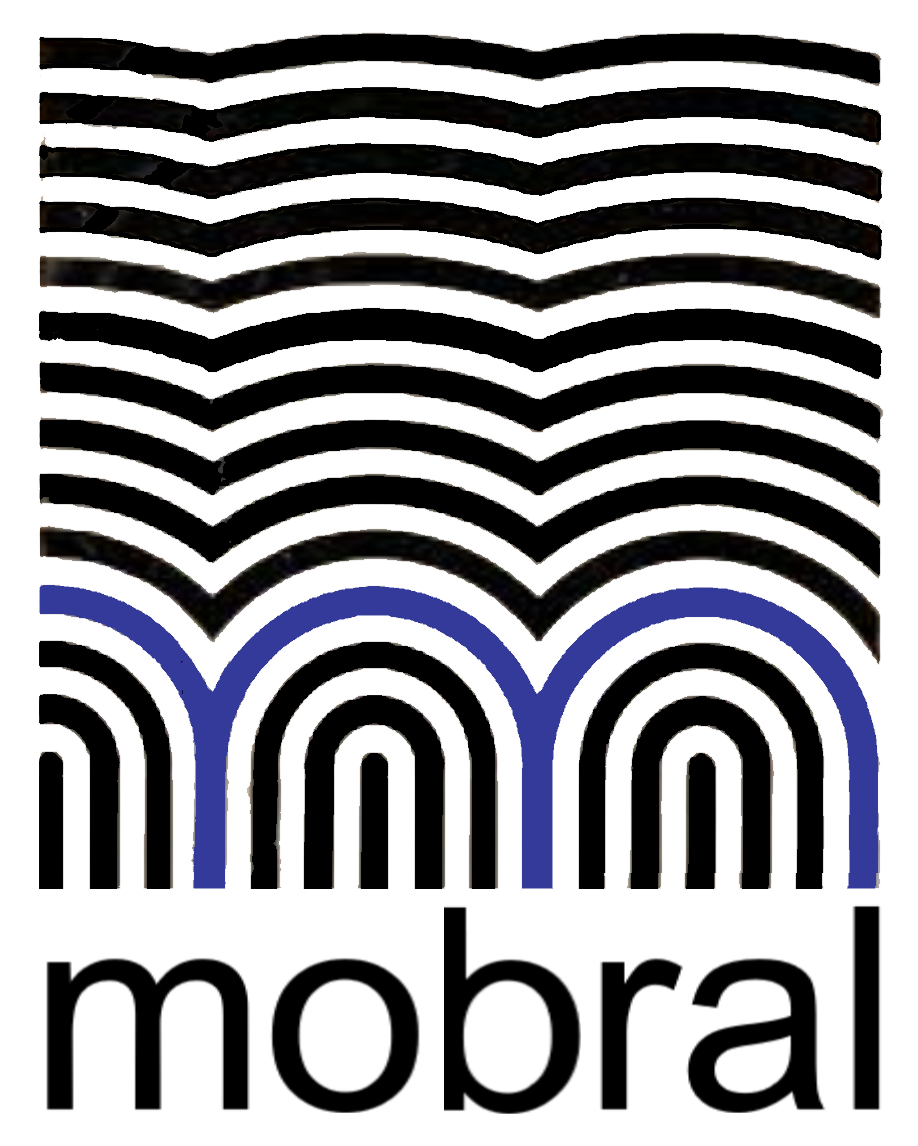
MOBRAL logo

The Brazilian Literacy Movement (in Portuguese: Movimento Brasileiro de Alfabetização; MOBRAL) was an adult literacy program established in 1967 and implemented from 1970 during the Brazilian military dictatorship. Created to combat the country's high illiteracy rates, it employed a standardized methodology using primers and volunteer instructors to teach basic reading, writing, and arithmetic. Despite its goal of eradicating illiteracy in ten years, it achieved only a 2.7% reduction and was criticized for promoting functional illiteracy. MOBRAL was discontinued in 1985 and replaced by the Educar Foundation, which was itself extinguished in 1990.

== History ==
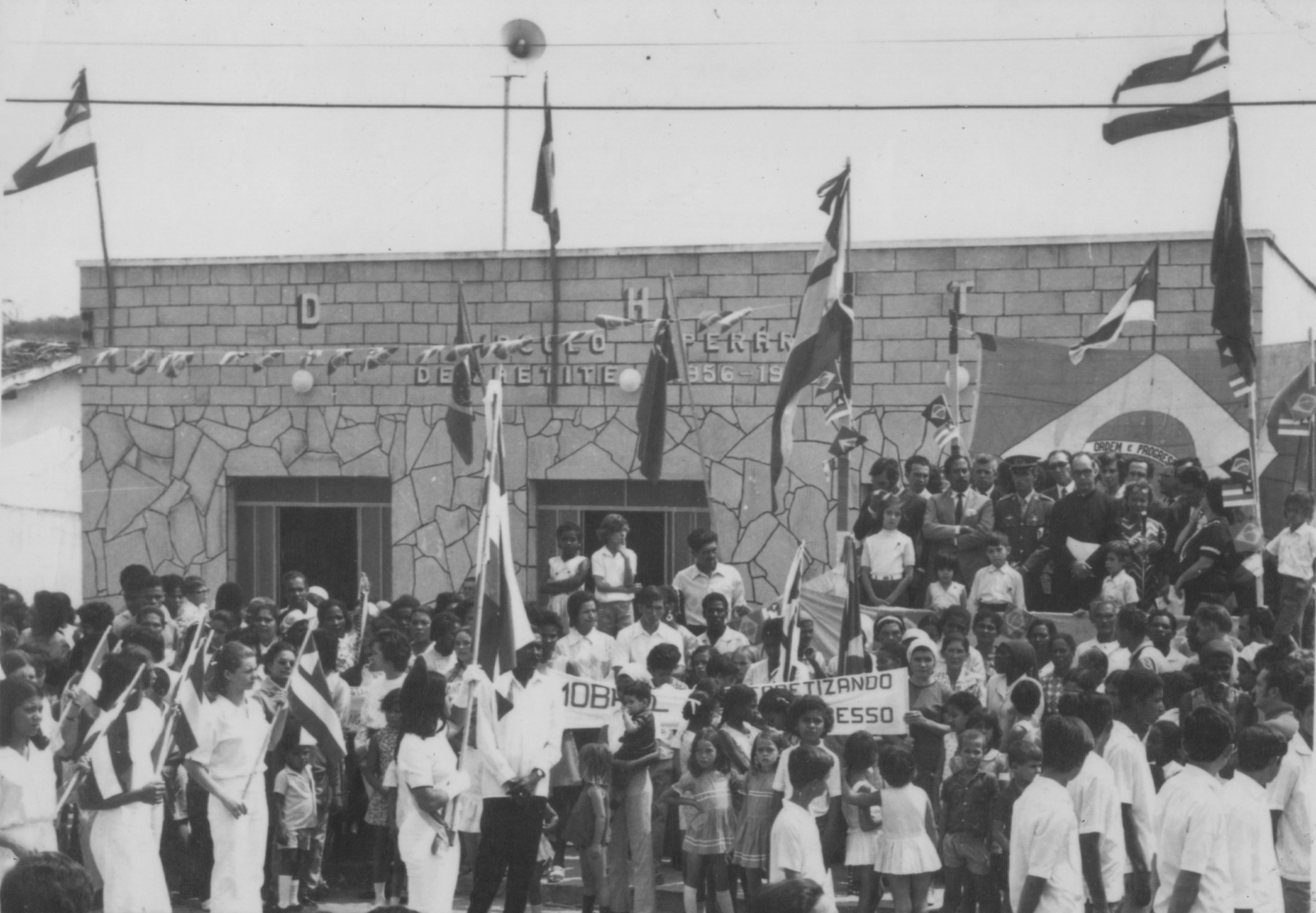
The installation ceremony of MOBRAL in the city of Caetité, Bahia, circa 1972.

The Brazilian Literacy Movement (MOBRAL) was a public foundation established by the federal government to execute the Functional Literacy and Continuing Education Plan for Adolescents and Adults, approved by Law No. 5,379 of December 15, 1967. Its effective implementation began in 1970, during the military dictatorship, in a context of high illiteracy rates in the country, which affected approximately 40% of the population aged 15 and over.

MOBRAL was conceived as a replacement for the National Literacy Program of the João Goulart government, coordinated by Paulo Freire, whose pedagogical approach was considered subversive by the military regime. While Freire's method sought the political awareness of learners, MOBRAL proposed a technicist and functional model focused on teaching basic reading, writing, and arithmetic skills, without developing students' critical capacity. The program's creation was formalized by laws and decrees that defined its structure, administrative autonomy, and funding sources, including resources from the Sports Lottery and income tax deductions for donations from legal entities.

MOBRAL adopted a standardized and centralized methodology, using primers, audiovisual materials, and a network of volunteer instructors, many of whom lacked specific pedagogical training. The program operated through agreements with states and municipalities, covering urban and rural areas. In addition to initial literacy, it offered complementary programs of continuing education and vocational training. MOBRAL's advertising campaign was intensive, contributing to its widespread dissemination throughout the national territory.

MOBRAL's declared goal was the eradication of illiteracy by the end of the 1980s. Census data indicate that illiteracy among the population aged 15 and over, which was 33.6% in 1970, decreased to 25.4% in 1980 and to 23.8% in 1985. Although there was a reduction, the program did not achieve the total eradication of the problem. Critics point out that its methodology contributed to functional illiteracy, and MOBRAL's administrative structure was considered costly in relation to the number of effectively literate students.

With the end of the military regime and the country's redemocratization, MOBRAL was extinguished in 1985 and replaced by the National Foundation for Youth and Adult Education (EDUCAR), established by Decree No. 91,980 of November 25, 1985. EDUCAR promoted the decentralization of actions, with the Union providing technical and financial support, while states, municipalities, and civil society organizations assumed the execution of literacy programs. The EDUCAR Foundation was itself extinguished in 1990, under the presidency of Fernando Collor. MOBRAL remains an important chapter in the history of Brazilian educational policies.

== See also ==
- Education in Brazil
- Cuban literacy campaign
- Nicaraguan Literacy Campaign
- Mission Robinson
