= TV Pirata =

Brazilian comedy television show

TV Pirata (Pirate TV) is a weekly Brazilian comedy show aired on Rede Globo between 1988 and 1990, being re-aired monthly in 1992. Some of the writers later went on to form the comedy troupe Casseta & Planeta. The show was first aired in April 1988 to fill a gap on Rede Globo's Tuesday night prime time line-up and its comedy was inspired by sketch comedy shows such as Saturday Night Live and Monty Python's Flying Circus with a no-nonsense approach to Brazilian comedy (something unusual at the time as most of Brazilian humor consisted of weekly shows featuring the same comedy characters); however, it mixed a new style of comedy with elements of Brazilian culture such as football, politics, pop culture, telenovelas, economics and celebrities. No well-known figure or member of any economical or social class was spared from the show's cutting-edge humor.

== Premise ==
The premise of the show was a TV studio being invaded by pirates who took over the programming department and put a tape on the air with some "unusual" programming. Another new element to Brazilian audiences was the performers, (well-known soap opera actors like Debora Bloch, Claudia Raia, Marco Nanini and Ney Latorraca with a few others) who weren't the usual comedic actors, but were dramatic actors doing more comedic roles (although some of them went on to perform in more comedies later in their careers).

== Reception ==
Despite the slow beginning (and almost cancellation), the idea of a fresh new comedy style began to settle among Brazilian audiences who grew to embrace the program and its writers, who at the time were still writing the comedy magazine Casseta Popular and the newspaper-like Planeta Diário (the latter a nod to The Daily Planet). While the sketch comedy style was not new to the audiences, it was done in a manner to be considered groundbreaking for the time and place while defying the old comedies styles on Brazilian television from the late 1960s to the early 1980s, and the show became a cultural phenomenon.

== Cancelation and revival ==
In 1990, due to weak cast changes and decrease in ratings, the series was cancelled. It experienced a short-lived revival in early 1992 but was cancelled later that year. However, the series obtained a cult status in Brazil since it was aired due to its uniqueness. The program has been released on DVD and was aired on Rede Globo's sister stations to celebrate its 40th anniversary in 2005. Some of the program's videos are also available through YouTube.
