= Pensions Act =

Pensions Act may refer to

- Pensions Act 1995, an Act of the Parliament of the United Kingdom
- Pensions Act 2004, an Act of the Parliament of the United Kingdom
- Pensions Act 2007, an Act of the Parliament of the United Kingdom
- Pensions Act 2008, an Act of the Parliament of the United Kingdom
- Future Pensions Act 2023, an Act of the Parliament of the Netherlands

== See also ==
- Pension Act
