= Jau =

Jau or JAU may refer to:

== Places ==
- Jaú, a city in São Paulo state, Brazil
- Jaú do Tocantins, a municipality in Tocantins state, Brazil
- Jaú National Park, in Brazil
- Jaú River (disambiguation)
- Francisco Carle Airport, Jauja, Peru (IATA: JAU)
- Campbell County Airport, Jacksboro, Campbell County, Tennessee, U.S. (FAA LID: JAU)

== Other uses ==
- Jau, formerly Indian units of measurement
- Fabrice Jau (born 1978), French footballer
- Euclydes Barbosa (1909–1988), known as Jaú, Brazilian footballer
- Yaur language, spoken in Indonesia, ISO 639-3 language code jau
- Jaú (Zungaro zungaro), a species of catfish

== See also ==
- Jahu (disambiguation)
- Jau-Dignac-et-Loirac, a commune in Gironde department, France
- Jau gok or Yau gok, traditional dumplings in Cantonese cuisine
