= Jehu (given name) =

Jehu is a masculine given name. The best known of that name is Jehu, a king of Israel in the Bible. There is also another biblical Jehu (prophet). Others bearing the name include:

- Jehu V. Chase (1869–1937), United States Navy rear admiral and Commander-in-Chief of the United States Fleet
- Jehu Chesson (born 1993), American National Football League player
- Jehu Chiapas (born 1984), Mexican footballer
- Jehu Davis (1738–1802), American planter and politician
- Jehu Elliott (1813–1876), Justice of the Indiana Supreme Court
- Jehu Eyre (1738–1781), American businessman and veteran of the French and Indian War and American Revolutionary War
- Jehu Grant (c. 1752–1840), runaway slave who served in the Continental Army during the American Revolutionary War
- Jehu Grubb (c. 1781–1854), American politician
- Yehu Orland (born 1981), Israeli basketball player and coach

== See also ==
- Jahu (disambiguation)
- Jehuu Caulcrick (born 1983), American football coach and former player
- Jehue Gordon (born 1991), Trinidadian hurdler
