= Jehu (disambiguation) =

Jehu is the tenth king of the northern Kingdom of Israel, according to the Bible.

For a list of other people named Jehu, see Jehu (given name)

Jehu may also refer to:

- Book of Jehu, a lost Jewish text possibly written by Jehu (prophet)
- Steve Jehu (born 1987), English gymnast
- Jehu-class landing craft, used by the Finnish Navy

== See also ==
- Jahu (disambiguation)
- Juhu, suburb in Mumbai, India
