= 1930 São Paulo FC season =

São Paulo
1930 season
- Chairman: (Brazil) Edgard de Souza Aranha
- Manager: (Brazil) Rubens Sales
- Campeonato Paulista: Runners-up
- Top goalscorer: Friedenreich (31)

The 1930 season was the first competitive season of São Paulo Futebol Clube that was founded on January 25. The club was created by an association between former members from Associação Atlética das Palmeiras and Club Athletico Paulistano, both teams had their football department closed in face of the advent of professional football. The new club led his name in honor of city of São Paulo and was opened at anniversary day of town being officially founded at the after day. At the end of his debut season the team reached the second position of Campeonato Paulista won by rival Corinthians.

== Scorers ==
| Position | Nation | Playing position | Name | Campeonato Paulista | Others | Total |
|---|---|---|---|---|---|---|
| 1 | (Brazil) | FW | Friedenreich | 27 | 4 | 31 |
| 2 | (Brazil) | FW | Luisinho | 12 | 0 | 12 |
| = | (Brazil) | | Siriri | 11 | 1 | 12 |
| 3 | (Brazil) | FW | Armandinho | 6 | 1 | 7 |
| = | (Brazil) | | Romeu | 6 | 1 | 7 |
| 4 | (Brazil) | DF | Barthô | 2 | 1 | 3 |
| 5 | (Brazil) | | Jahú | 2 | 0 | 2 |
| = | (Brazil) | | Mário Seixas | 2 | 0 | 2 |
| = | (Brazil) | | Milton | 2 | 0 | 2 |
| = | (Brazil) | | Zuanella | 2 | 0 | 2 |
| 6 | (Brazil) | | Abatte | 1 | 0 | 1 |
| = | (Uruguay) | | Emilio Almiñana | 1 | 0 | 1 |
| = | (Brazil) | | Formiga | 1 | 0 | 1 |
| = | (Brazil) | | Junqueirinha | 1 | 0 | 1 |
| = | (Brazil) | | Scott | 1 | 0 | 1 |
| | | | Total | 77 | 14 | 91 |

=== Overall ===
| Games played | 31 (26 Campeonato Paulista, 5 Friendly match) |
| Games won | 19 (16 Campeonato Paulista, 3 Friendly match) |
| Games drawn | 10 (9 Campeonato Paulista, 1 Friendly match) |
| Games lost | 2 (1 Campeonato Paulista, 1 Friendly match) |
| Goals scored | 91 |
| Goals conceded | 36 |
| Goal difference | +55 |
| Best result | 6–1 (A) v Juventus - Friendly match - 1930.3.23 |
| Worst result | 1–2 (A) v Vasco da Gama - Friendly match - 1930.5.13; 1–2 (A) v Corinthians - Campeonato Paulista - 1930.5.25 |
| Top scorer | Friedenreich (31) |

Source: São Paulo FC

== Friendlies ==
| May 13 National | Vasco da Gama | 2–1 | São Paulo | Rio de Janeiro |
| 00:00 (UTC-3) | Goal | (Report) (pt) | Friedenreich | Stadium: São Januário |

| July 14 Taça Nestor | AA Pinhalense | 1–3 | São Paulo | Espírito Santo do Pinhal |
| | Goal | | Goal |

| July 20 Taça Dr. Cunha Bueno | Fluminense / Vasco | 1–3 | São Paulo | Rio de Janeiro |
| | Goal | | Goal | Stadium: Laranjeiras |

| August 10 International | São Paulo (Brazil) | 5–3 | United States | São Paulo |
| | Armandinho 1'; Friedenreich 8', 17', 21'; Romeu 60' | | Patenaude 6', 64'; Brown 33' | Stadium: Chácara da Floresta; Referee: Attílio Grimaldi |

| November 15 National | São Paulo | 2–2 | Palestra Itália | São Paulo |
| 00:00 (UTC-3) | Barthô; Siriri | (Report) (pt) | Goal | Stadium: Chácara da Floresta; Referee: Karl Strobel |

== Official competitions ==
=== Campeonato Paulista ===
| March 16 Round 1 | São Paulo | 0–0 | Ypiranga | São Paulo |
| 00:00 (UTC-3) | | (Report) (pt) | | Stadium: Chácara da Floresta; Referee: Cid Rosso |

| March 23 Round 2 | Juventus | 1–6 | São Paulo | São Paulo |
| 00:00 (UTC-3) | Moacyr 74' | (Report) (pt) | Barthô 10'; Friedenreich 35', (pen.), 85'; Luisinho 48'; Zuanella 70' | Stadium: Estádio Conde Rodolfo Crespi (Rua Javari); Attendance: 2,000; Referee: Caohuby Reis |

| March 30 Round 3 | São Paulo | 2–2 | Palestra Itália | São Paulo |
| 00:00 (UTC-3) | Friedenreich 5'; Zuanella 15' | (Report) (pt) | Serafim 23' (pen.); Heitor 75' | Stadium: Chácara da Floresta; Referee: Caohuby Reis |

| April 6 Round 4 | Portuguesa | 1–1 | São Paulo | São Paulo |
| 00:00 (UTC-3) | | (Report) (pt) | Mário Seixas | Stadium: Rua Cesário Ramalho; Referee: Alzemiro Ballio |

| April 13 Round 5 | Guarani | 1–3 | São Paulo | Campinas |
| 00:00 (UTC-3) | Goal | (Report) (pt) | Luisinho, Friedenreich | Stadium: Campo da Guanabara; Referee: Enéas Sgarzi |

| April 20 Round 6 | América | 1–6 | São Paulo | São Paulo |
| 00:00 (UTC-3) | Goal | (Report) (pt) | Friedenreich,, Luisinho; Scott; Siriri | Stadium: Rua Thabor; Referee: Pedro Thomaz |

| May 3 Round 7 | Germânia | 2–4 | São Paulo | São Paulo |
| 00:00 (UTC-3) | Lothar (pen.), | (Report) (pt) | Luisinho; Mário Seixas; Friedenreich, | Stadium: Chácara da Floresta; Referee: Alzemiro Ballio |

| May 11 Round 8 | Santos | 2–2 | São Paulo | Santos |
| 00:00 (UTC-3) | Goal | (Report) (pt) | Luisinho; Friedenreich | Stadium: Estádio Urbano Caldeira (Vila Belmiro); Referee: Victório Sylvestre |

| May 17 Round 9 | São Paulo | 2–2 | Sírio | São Paulo |
| 00:00 (UTC-3) | Friedenreich, | (Report) (pt) | Goal | Stadium: Chácara da Floresta; Referee: Nestor P. de Carvalho |

| May 25 Round 10 | Corinthians | 2–1 | São Paulo | São Paulo |
| 00:00 (UTC-3) | Gamba; Filó | (Report) (pt) | Siriri | Stadium: Estádio Alfredo Schürig (Parque São Jorge); Attendance: 20,000; Referee: Duílio Ranieri |

| June 1 Round 11 | Atlético Santista | 0–3 | São Paulo | Santos |
| 00:00 (UTC-3) | | (Report) (pt) | Romeu, Siriri | Stadium: Av. Conselheiro Nébias; Referee: Irineu Malta |

| June 8 Round 12 | São Paulo | 2–1 | Internacional | São Paulo |
| 00:00 (UTC-3) | Jahú, | (Report) (pt) | Ministro (pen.) | Stadium: Chácara da Floresta; Referee: Pedro Thomaz |

| August 17 Round 13 | A.A. São Bento | 0–3 | São Paulo | São Paulo |
| 00:00 (UTC-3) | | (Report) (pt) | Friedenreich; Luisinho; Romeu | Stadium: Ponte Grande; Referee: Carlos Rusticcelli |

| August 31 Round 14 | Ypiranga | 0–5 | São Paulo | São Paulo |
| 00:00 (UTC-3) | | (Report) (pt) | Friedenreich 30', Luisinho; Siriri, | Stadium: Rua Cesário Ramalho; Referee: Karl Strobel |

| September 7 Round 15 | São Paulo | 3–0 | Atlético Santista | São Paulo |
| 00:00 (UTC-3) | Siriri, Friedenreich | (Report) (pt) | | Stadium: Chácara da Floresta; Referee: Karl Strobel |

| September 14 Round 16 | São Paulo | 5–1 | Sírio | São Paulo |
| 00:00 (UTC-3) | Romeu, Friedenreich 25'; Luisinho 30'; Siriri | (Report) (pt) | Petro 32' | Stadium: Chácara da Floresta; Referee: Atílio Grimaldi |

| September 21 Round 17 | Palestra Itália | 2–2 | São Paulo | São Paulo |
| 00:00 (UTC-3) | Lara 34'; Osses | (Report) (pt) | Siriri 59'; Friedenreich | Stadium: Estádio Palestra Itália (Parque Antarctica); Attendance: 30,000; Referee: Karl Strobel |

| September 28 Round 18 | São Paulo | 1–1 | Internacional | São Paulo |
| 00:00 (UTC-3) | Milton | (Report) (pt) | Martins | Stadium: Chácara da Floresta; Referee: Atílio Grimaldi |

| October 5 Round 19 | São Paulo | 4–0 | A.A. São Bento | São Paulo |
| 00:00 (UTC-3) | Friedenreich,, Milton | (Report) (pt) | | Stadium: Chácara da Floresta; Referee: Atílio Grimaldi |

| October 12 Round 20 | São Paulo | 4–0 | Juventus | São Paulo |
| 00:00 (UTC-3) | Barthô; Friedenreich; Formiga; Siriri | (Report) (pt) | | Stadium: Chácara da Floresta; Referee: Victório Sylvestre |

| November 23 Round 21 | São Paulo | 3–3 | Santos | São Paulo |
| 00:00 (UTC-3) | Armandinho; Abate; Friedenreich 88' (pen.) | (Report) (pt) | Feitiço (pen.), Evangelista | Stadium: Estádio Palestra Itália (Parque Antárctica); Referee: Victório Sylvestre |

| November 30 Round 22 | São Paulo | 5–1 | Portuguesa | São Paulo |
| 00:00 (UTC-3) | Armandinho, Luisinho; Siriri; Romeu | (Report) (pt) | Tatu | Stadium: Chácara da Floresta; Referee: Karl Strobel |

| December 7 Round 23 | São Paulo | 1–1 | Corinthians | São Paulo |
| 00:00 (UTC-3) | Friedenreich | (Report) (pt) | Goal | Stadium: Chácara da Floresta; Referee: Thomaz Ciccarelli |

| December 14 Round 24 | São Paulo | 5–1 | Guarani | São Paulo |
| 00:00 (UTC-3) | Armandinho, Friedenreich, Emílio Armiñana | (Report) (pt) | Goal | Stadium: Chácara da Floresta; Referee: Karl Strobel |

| December 21 Round 25 | São Paulo | 2–1 | Germânia | São Paulo |
| 00:00 (UTC-3) | Junqueirinha; Luisinho | (Report) (pt) | Goal | Stadium: Chácara da Floresta; Referee: Atílio Grimaldi |

| December 28 Round 26 | São Paulo | 2–1 | América | São Paulo |
| 00:00 (UTC-3) | Luisinho 25'; Armandinho 50' | (Report) (pt) | Sandro | Stadium: Estádio Palestra Itália (Parque Antárctica); Referee: Carlos Rusticcelli |

==== Record ====
| Final Position | Points | Matches | Wins | Draws | Losses | Goals For | Goals Away | Win% |
|---|---|---|---|---|---|---|---|---|
| 2nd | 41 | 26 | 16 | 9 | 1 | 77 | 27 | 79% |
