= Jaú River =

Jaú River may refer to:

- Jaú River (Amazonas), Brazil
- Jaú River (São Paulo), Brazil

== See also ==
- Jau (disambiguation)
