= Pensions in the Netherlands =

Average effective age of retirement for men, 1970 to 2018.

Pensions in the Netherlands consist of three pillar old age pension system made up of a state pension system, a private pension system regulated by pension law, and individual private pension. The systems are provided through a diversity of funding sources and are considered as fair of distribution for people living in the Netherlands. It is supervised by the Dutch central bank and the Dutch financial market authority. The Dutch pension system combines a pay-as-you-go system, in which workers pay for retirees' benefits, and an individual investment system.

Compared with other countries, the Netherlands is relatively better at solving the problem of population aging, because it absorbs different pension fund models and implements consistent and risk-sharing policies. In 2020 it came out at or near the top in international rankings according to the Mercer Global Pension Index.

On 1 July 2023, the Future Pensions Act came into effect revising the Dutch pension system.

== Ranking ==
According to the Melbourne Mercer Global Pension Index, which measures each retirement income system against more than 40 indicators, the Netherlands takes first place with its pension system in 2020. The total score of this pension system is 82.6/100.

- Adequacy: 81.5/100. (1st)
- Sustainability: 79.3/100. (2nd)
- Integrity:88.9/100. (3rd)
- Total:82.6/100(1st)

In the Netherlands, retired people are able to receive their pension even if they do not live in the Netherlands. After retiring, one can choose to be in any country to extend annuities, also one can choose a fixed country to get annuities; The country of coverage shall be determined by the employer or foreign employee.

== Pensions System In the Netherlands ==
The Dutch pension system combines a pay-as-you-go system, in which workers pay for retirees' benefits, and an individual investment system.

In the individual investment system, groups and individuals make high-risk and low-risk investments to make up for the amount they receive from the state pension. These different models can be seen as the three pillars of the Dutch pension system.

The three pillars are:

- the state pension system as per the Algemene Ouderdomswet (AOW) law,
- private pension system regulated by pension law,
- individual private pension.

=== Pillar One: State Pensions ===
The state pension system (AOW) is administered as a pay-as-you-go system, with government funds and payroll taxes providing the funding for it. Everyone who lived and/or worked in the Netherlands in the 50 years before the AOW Pension age (see below) is entitled to an AOW pension. Everyone living in the Netherlands, with some exceptions, is insured, and with every year people are insured, they build up rights to 2% of the full AOW pension. The full AOW pension is tied to the minimum wage, with married or cohabiting couples each receiving 50% of the minimum wage, while those who live alone are entitled to a pension worth more than 70% of the minimum wage.

The moment when a person receives AOW has changed since 2016. In this year the Dutch government announced that they will connect the data of receiving AOW to the national life expectancy. When a person reaches the age of 67 in or before 2021, the age AOW payments will start. From 2020 the AOW age will be directly connected to the life expectancy, which means that the government is able to change the age of when a citizen receives AOW per year.

If you have lived or worked outside the Netherlands, you are likely to receive a lower pension after retirement because you did not contribute to the insurance for a period of time and therefore accumulated less. There are also a few people living in the Netherlands who are not insured under the AOW plan. If you were born on or after April 1, 1950, you will not receive an AOW pension if your insurance period is less than one year.

The type of AOW pension you will get in a different situation as following:

- People who live on their own - 70% of the net minimum wage.
- People who are married or living with someone - 50% of the net minimum wage.
- If you have a partner who has also reached the AOW pension age - together receive up to 100% of the net minimum wage.
- If you have a partner who has not yet reached the AOW pension age - a supplementary allowance on top of your AOW pension, the supplementary allowance will be discontinued in 2015.

=== Pillar Two: Private Employee Pensions ===
The second pillar consists of collective pension schemes, which is linked to specific industries or companies. Such collective plans are managed by pension funds or insurance companies. The company pays its employees a monthly pension fund. The return on investment from capital investment pays for pension benefits for current and future retirees. Employees can choose the types of plans in their pension funds. You should update your pension data to your boss when you change jobs.

Although pension funds are related to specific enterprises or industries, the law requires pension funds to maintain judicial and financial independence and operate in the form of non-profit institutions, which ensures the safety of pension funds. Once the financial situation of enterprises occurs, pension funds can also be effectively protected. Most pension money in the Netherlands is managed by pension funds.

There is also a wide range of private pension funds regulated by the pension law which are intended as pension provisions for employed persons.

There are three different types of pension funds:

- industry-wide pension funds, which cater to an entire sector of the economy such as the construction or retail industry, and which can be mandated by the government,
- corporate pension funds, which are for employees of a single company or corporation,
- pension funds for independent professionals.

Private pension funds in the Netherlands are non-profit organizations and operate as foundations, and are considered independent legal entities not forming a part of any company under Dutch law. Therefore, if a company gets into financial difficulties, its pension fund will not be affected. More than 90% of Dutch employees belong to a private pension fund.

==== Mandatory Nature ====
Dutch law does not require membership in a pension fund. But if a company decides to not provide a pension scheme for its employees, the government can enforce it. As a result, more than 90% of employees and employers have a pension scheme. In this case, the employer is no longer free to decide whether to provide a pension plan for the employee. Mandatory means that all employees are involved. This also means that employees can change jobs within the industry more easily without affecting pensions. Companies that do not fall into this type of mandatory program can choose a corporate pension fund or insurance company to manage their pension scheme.

==== Pension Fund Organisation ====
Employers and employees have the final say in the pension scheme. In corporate pension funds, some retired members may serve as employees on the board of directors. But most funds are outsourced to external executors, typically insurance companies or specialized pension plan managers. These are private organizations.

==== Facts And Figures About The 2nd Pillar Pension Funds ====
Almost everyone belongs to a pension fund. 75% of employees have industry-wide pension funds. The size of the Fund varies greatly depending on the number of members and the accrued capital. The investment capital managed by pension funds even exceeds the gross national product.

==== Pension Fund Administration Costs ====
The cost of pension funds is lower without profit motives. Therefore, reduce the cost of administration is necessary . In addition, except administration costs, these organizations also generate marketing costs.

=== Pillar Three: Individual Private Pensions ===
The third pillar is formed by an individual pension. These are mainly used by the self-employed and employees in sectors without a collective pension scheme. Simply, it is pension wealth management products. In this way, individuals can buy and manage pension products or investments independently, such as life insurance, stocks or real estate and related tax benefits. Anyone can purchase a product in the third pillar to meet his/her requirements. In this way, people can save extra pension, often taking advantage of tax benefits. If a person chooses to save money or themselves this is also considered to be part of the third pillar. When someone has a debt-free home or stocks that they sell at the moment of pension, this value can be seen as additional wealth that can be used for a better and more comfortable living standard.

== Netherlands Retirement Age ==
The AOW pension age will be increased as follows:

- To 66 in 2018
- To 67 in 2021
- To 67 years and 3 months in 2022

From 2022, the AOW pension age will be linked to life expectancy. Average life expectancy has stayed more or less the same. Because there is a changing with retirement age, the Sociale Verzekeringsbank (SVB) offers a Dutch pension age calculator to find your individual Dutch retirement age.

Early Retirement is an option, but it usually has to be self-financed until the official Dutch pension age, before which AOW payments will not be made or otherwise reduced. only In one particular case, you can opt for Early Retirement (vergelijkbare uitkering, VUT) if the conditions are met (see SVB for details), and you may be eligible for transitional benefits. Similarly, you can also choose to delay your retirement, beyond the retirement age can increase your pension benefits and allowances.

== Pensions in the Netherlands for expats ==
For expats, there are the following prerequisites before considering a pension scheme. For example, the maximum amount of corporate-related pension wages in 2017 amounts to 103.317 euros. For expats, the coverage of the pensions scheme might be legally covered as a “pension” or more like “insurance” and it might relocate with the expat to each new country or it might have to stay in one country. The transfer of pension capital from a Dutch pension plan to another country is only possible if the pension scheme in the next country has the same elaborate requirements as the Dutch pension scheme.

The Netherlands has social security agreements with the following countries:

- Argentina
- Australia
- Belize
- Bosnia Herzegovina
- Canada (including Quebec)
- Chile
- Ecuador
- Egypt
- Hong Kong
- India
- Indonesia
- Israel (except for the Gaza Strip, West Bank, East Jerusalem, Golan)
- Japan
- Jordan
- Cape Verde
- Channel Islands (Jersey, Guernsey, Alderney, Herm, Jethou)
- Kosovo
- Macedonia
- Mali
- Morocco
- Monaco
- Montenegro
- New Zealand
- Panama
- Paraguay
- Philippines
- Serbia
- Surinam
- Thailand
- Tunisia
- Turkey
- The United States of America
- Uruguay
- South Africa
- South Korea

Transferring pension capital to a Dutch pension plan from another country is generally less difficult with meeting all requirements.

== Example ==
The gross annual salary of an employee is €50,000. The minimum deductible for the state pension is €13,449. For this employee, his/her pensionable base is €36,551.

In the new Pension agreement (‘Pensioenakkoord’) the maximum pensionable salary is fixed at €100,000. For salaries above €100,000, the government intends to create a new (tax-exempt) savings facility.

== Benefits ==
=== Old-age Pensions ===
Pensions provide employees with lifetime income protection from the date of retirement. It guarantees the living security of employees without a source of income after retirement.

=== Partner’s Pensions ===
A partner's pension is used by the employee's partner after the employee's death and takes effect immediately after the employee's death. The death of an employee may result in the loss of a source of life that the partner may have. The partner's pension is to protect the employee's partner's basic life after the employee's death. From 2014 onwards, the highest wage available is (fictional) 1.33% of the final salary per year.

=== Orphans’ Pensions ===
Orphan pensions are similar to partner pensions and are available to employees who have died and are effective immediately after their death. The difference is that the orphan's pension is paid temporarily until the child or foster child reaches the age of 30 and will not be issued thereafter. The orphan pension is up to 14% of the (nominal) final salary (28% of the full orphan).

The essence of pension is to provide security for the old age life without income through the early accumulation of work.

== See also ==
- Pan-European Pension
