= Future Pensions Act =

States-General of the Netherlands
- Long title: Amendment of the Pension Act, the Income Tax Act 2001 and any other laws in connection with revision of the pension system, standardization of the survivor's pension, adjustment of the tax treatment of pension and any other changes with regard to pension
- Passed by: House of Representatives
- Passed: 22 December 2022
- Passed by: Senate
- Passed: 30 May 2023

First chamber: House of Representatives
- Introduced by: Carola Schouten
- Introduced: 29 March 2022
- Voting summary: 93 voted for; 48 voted against
- Voting summary: 46 voted for; 27 voted against
- Status: Current legislation

The Future Pensions Act (Dutch: Wet toekomst pensioenen, abbreviated Wtp) is an amendment to welfare law in the Netherlands. This law revises the Dutch pension system and amends thirteen laws, including the Pension Act. The law came into effect on 1 July 2023, and pension funds currently have until 2028 to switch to the new system.

== Contents ==
The law relates to the supplementary pension that is accrued with a pension fund. The average system is being replaced by personal pension pots per participant. The pension funds no longer make any promises about the amount of the pension benefit, but rely on the accrued capital. Because investments at a young age have more time to yield, this carries more weight in the new system. Because the commitment disappears, the pension also moves more quickly with the state of the financial markets.

For this transition, 1,500 billion euros of pension money in collective pension pots must be divided between personal pension pots. This process is called entering.

A pension pot represents the life insurance value of a pension entitlement. This means that the personal pot cannot run out due to longevity, but that no money is left for heirs in the event of premature death.

== Creation ==
=== Pension agreement ===
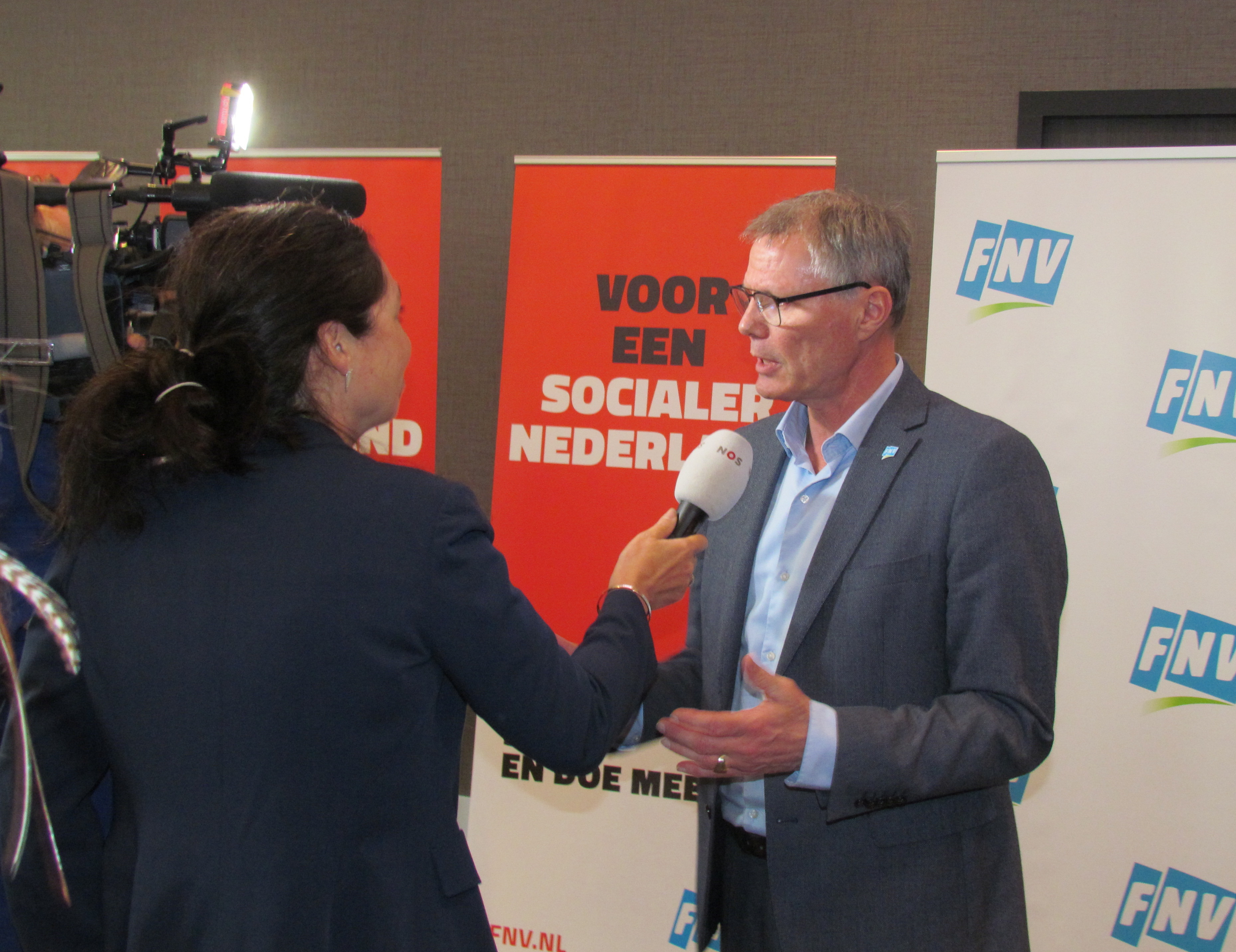
Federation of Dutch Trade Unions chairman Han Busker speaks to the press after union members approved the pension agreement in 2019.

Since 2004, there has been a desire in Dutch politics and among employers and trade unions to reform the pension system, partly because of the aging population. In 2010 they reached a political agreement, but this was largely not implemented due to the government's budget crisis in 2012. Based on that agreement at the time, the State Attorney had advised not to make entry mandatory for legal sustainability. The official advice on the advice of the State Advocate was made public on 8 December 2023. The advice of the State Advocate remained secret, but the meaning became clear.

Ultimately, a pension agreement was concluded in 2019, which formed the basis for the Future Pensions Act. The condition for support from the trade unions for this was a more limited increase in the state pension age. A further elaboration of the pension agreement was presented in June 2020. The membership of the FNV trade union initially postponed voting, but agreed to the implementation in July 2019.

=== Legal treatment ===
The pension agreement then had to be developed into a law. At the end of 2020, Minister of Social Affairs and Employment Wouter Koolmees presented the draft law. 800 responses were given to the consultation. This high number took longer to process than planned, delaying the law by a year.

==== House of Representatives ====
Koolmees' successor, Minister for Poverty Policy, Participation and Pensions Carola Schouten, finally submitted the bill to the House of Representatives on 29 March 2022. The House debated the bill for over 100 hours. Although the Fourth Rutte cabinet had had a majority in the House of Representatives, it also had to persuade opposition parties in view of the minority in the Senate. GroenLinks and the Labour Party set three amendment proposals as a condition, such as the legal target to halve the number of employees without a pension plan. These were adopted with support from the coalition. Eighteen other amendment proposals also received a majority, such as limiting freedom of funds, less extreme investment risks and equalizing pensioners. On 22 December 2022, the law was passed in the House of Representatives, supported by VVD, D66, CDA, PvdA, GroenLinks, Christian Union, Reformed Political Party and Volt Netherlands (93 votes in favor, 48 against).

==== Senate ====
After consideration in the House of Representatives, it was sent to the Dutch Senate. Opposition parties PVV, 50PLUS, JA21 and the Socialist Party tried to delay the legislative process in the chamber due to the 2023 Dutch provincial elections which took place in March and the 2023 Senate elections which took place at the end of May. Over one thousand written questions about the law were asked.

To respond to concerns in the Senate, Minister Schouten promised to give pension funds until at least 2028 to switch to the new system. She also promised to appoint a government commissioner to monitor whether this is feasible.

During the debate in the Senate, the Socialist Party stated that a two-thirds majority was required for the law. The law amends the General Pension Act for Political Office Holders (Appa), for which the constitution states that a two-thirds majority is required. However, according to Minister Schouten, this was not necessary because it only concerns legal technical changes that do not mean any changes in practice. On 30 May, the Senate agreed with the finding that a simple majority is sufficient. The same evening, the Senate also approved the present law (46 in favour, 27 against).
