= Jahu =

Jahu may refer to:

== Given name ==
- Jahu Dewitt Miller (1857–1911), American educator, librarian, journalist, minister, orator and book collector
- Ja Hu Stafford (1834–1913), sometimes spelled Jahu, an American pioneer of Cochise County, Arizona
- Jahu Taponen, Finnish inline hockey goaltender - see 2013 IIHF Inline Hockey World Championship
- Jahú, footballer in Brazil - see 1930 São Paulo FC season
- Jahu, a fictional character in Sky Doll comics

== Other uses ==
- Jahu (Himachal Pradesh), a village in Himachal Pradesh, India
- Zungaro jahu, a species of Zungaro, long-whiskered catfishes
- Jahú, a Savoia-Marchetti S.55 flying boat that crossed the Atlantic in 1927
- Jahu, a matchmaker in a Hajong marriage

== See also ==
- Jehu (disambiguation)
