= Barthô =

Brazilian footballer (1899-1935)

Personal information
- Full name: Bartholomeu Vicente Gugani
- Date of birth: 28 January 1899
- Place of birth: São Paulo, Brazil
- Date of death: 17 April 1935 (aged 36)
- Position: Defender

International career
Years	Team	Apps	(Gls)
1922	Brazil	5	(0)

Bartholomeu Vicente Gugani (28 January 1899 – 17 April 1935), known as Barthô, was a Brazilian footballer. He played in five matches for the Brazil national football team in 1922. He was also part of Brazil's squad for the 1922 South American Championship.
