= Jehu Grant =

American slave

Jehu Grant (c. 1752 – December 28, 1840) was born a slave in Rhode Island. He was living in Narragansett in 1777 when he ran away from his enslaver Elihu Champlen and served in various capacities in the Continental Army for eight months during the American Revolutionary War as a waggoner and servant to John Skidmore Wagon master. His situation was discovered, and he was returned to Champlen, who later sold him to a man named Grant. With the assistance of Joshua Swann, his freedom was purchased from that enslaver, and in return, he agreed to work for Swann for a certain time.

Joshua Swann took up residence in Milton, Saratoga County, New York, and brought along Jehu Grant. After the agreed term had expired, Jehu Grant continued to live in Saratoga County. He married and had several children: he is listed in the 1820 Federal Census of the Town of Milton with a household consisting of two males under 14, one male 14 to 26 and one over 45, and with a female 14 to 26 and one over 45.

In 1832, the United States Congress enacted the first comprehensive Pension Act, which granted an annual stipend to any veteran of the Revolutionary War who could prove his service. Jehu Grant was one of several dozen black veterans and one of thousands who applied for the fund. The only proof many of these veterans had that they had been part of the fight was their recollections. To receive the funds, ex-soldiers had to tell their stories to a local court reporter, who sent the records to Washington, D.C. for disposition.

At the time of his pension application, Grant was 80 years old and blind. He appealed with the assistance of a neighbor.

The following is an excerpt from the letter he sent to J. L. Edward, the then Commissioner of Pensions:

Your servant begs leave to state that he forwarded to the War Department a declaration founded on the pension Act of June 1832 praying to be allowed a pension (If his memory serves him) for ten Months service in the American Army of the revolutionary war — that he enlisted as a soldier but was put to the service of a teamster in the summer & a waiter in the winter.

Grant's application was denied, as was a subsequent plea. Because he was employed as a waggoner and waiter and not a proper soldier, the U.S. government in 1832 would not recognize his claim.
