= Pension Act =

The 1832 Pension Act, formally titled "An Act supplementary to the "Act for the relief of certain surviving officers and soldiers of the revolution.", 4 Stat. 529 (1832) was passed June 7, 1832 by the 22nd United States Congress as a final supplementary pension act for Revolutionary War veterans. The act provided every surviving officer and soldier who served at least 2 years in the continental army and other units with a pension of full pay for life. Those who served for a period less than 2 years, but more than 6 months, were granted partial pay that was chosen depending on the period they served. The act also granted the same pensions in the same manner for officers and mariners who served in the U.S. Navy during the Revolutionary War.

== Notable Characters ==
- Jehu Grant was a slave who escaped his master out of fear of fighting for the British, and instead joined the Continental Army. He was returned to his master after a while and after many years when he was a free man he applied for pension for his service, but was denied because he was a slave when he served in the army.
