= Aldyr Schlee =

Brazilian journalist and author (1934–2018)

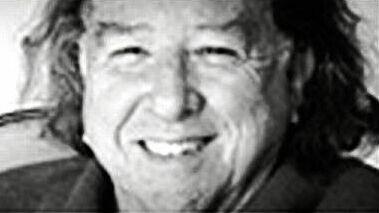
Aldyr Schlee, 2013

Aldyr Garcia Schlee (Jaguarão (RS), November 22, 1934 – Pelotas (RS), November 15, 2018) was a Brazilian writer, journalist, translator, illustrator, and professor.

== Biography ==
Schlee had two main areas of expertise: Brazilian – Uruguayan international relations and the literature of Uruguay and of Brazil, with further specialty in works produced by authors from the state of Rio Grande do Sul.

He wrote various short stories and his work has been included in a number of anthologies.

Some of his books first appeared in Spanish and were published in Uruguay. Personally fluent to the highest levels both in Portuguese and Spanish, he also grew up with and around his family who spoke German, historically a strong regional language (see Riograndenser Hunsrückisch) and the second most widely spoken language in the state of Rio Grande do Sul.

As an academic, he founded the Faculty of Journalism of the Catholic University of Pelotas and taught international law at the FederaL University of Pelotas, from which he was removed by the military dictatorship due to his left-wing and anti-regime positions.

In 1953 Schlee designed the world-famous Brazil national football team jersey Camisa Canarinho. Schlee died on November 15, 2018, at age 83, and on the eve of a Brazil vs. Uruguay friendly match in London.

== Prizes received ==
Schlee twice received the prestigious Bienal Nestlé de Literatura Brasileira literary prize; and he also granted the Prêmio Açorianos de Literatura prize, five times.

== Witness to regional language repression by the State during World War II ==
In a 2011 interview Schlee said that during World War II he personally witnessed German-Brazilian farmers in a chain gang, arrested because they had been caught speaking their native language when the Brazilian Vargas government had summarily prohibited anyone from speaking it; the author explained how it shocked him and caused a lifelong impression on him, to see those men being paraded single file through the city of Santa Cruz do Sul where he lived at that time.

== Bibliography ==
- 2014: "Memórias de o que já não será", ed. Ardotempo
- 2013: "Contos da Vida Difícil", ed. Ardotempo
- 2010: "Don Frutos", ed. Ardotempo
- 2009: "Glossário de Simões Lopes Neto" – São Paulo
- 2009: "Os limites do impossível – os contos gardelianos", ed. Ardotempo, Porto Alegre
- 2007: "Contos gauchescos e Lendas do Sul", de JSLN, edição crítica com estabelecimento da linguagem. IEL/Unisinos.
- 2000: "Contos de Verdades", contos (ed. Mercado Aberto)
- 1998: "Linha Divisória" (contos, ed. Melhoramentos)
- 1997: "Contos de Futebol" (contos, ed. Mercado Aberto)
- 1991: "El dia en que el papa fue a Melo" (contos, ed. de la Banda Oriental) (republished in Portuguese as "O Dia em que o Papa foi a Melo", ed. Mercado Aberto, 1999)
- 1984: "Uma Terra Só" (contos, ed. Melhoramentos)
- 1983: "Contos de Sempre" (contos, ed. Mercado Aberto)

Anthologies

- 2003: "Melhores Contos do Rio Grande do Sul" (contos, ed. IEL)
- 1999: "Para Ler os Gaúchos" (contos, ed. Novo Século)
- 1996: "Nós os Teuto-gaúchos" (ensaios, ed. da Universidade/UFRGS)
- 1994: "Nós os Gaúchos 2" (ensaios, ed. da Universidade/UFRGS)
- 1988: "Autores Gaúchos 20: Aldyr Garcia Schlee" (antologia, ed. IEL)
- 1977: "Histórias Ordinárias" (contos, ed. Documento)

Translations from Spanish to Portuguese

- 1990 Para Sempre Uruguai (Antologia de contos). Tradução de Sérgio Faraco e Aldyr Garcia Schlee. Porto Alegre: Instituto Estadual do Livro.
- 1996 Sarmiento, Domingo Faustino. Facundo: civilização e barbárie no pampa argentino. Tradução, notas e estudo crítico de Aldyr Garcia Schlee. Porto Alegre: Editora da Universidade Federal do Rio Grande do Sul / Editora da Universidade Católica do Rio Grande do Sul.
- 1997 Acevedo Díaz, Eduardo. Pátria Uruguaia. Antologia. Seleção, tradução e notas de Aldyr Garcia Schlee. Porto Alegre: Instituto Estadual do Livro.
- 1997 Güiraldes, Ricardo. Don Segundo Sombra. Tradução de Augusto Meyer, revisão da tradução por Aldyr Garcia Schlee. Porto Alegre: LP&M.

Translations from Portuguese to Spanish

- 1991 Lopes Neto, João Simões. La salamanca del Jarau. Porto Alegre: IEL-IGEL.
- 2000 Martins, Cyro. Campo afora/Campo afuera. Edição bilíngue português/espanhol. Tradução para o espanhol de Aldyr Garcia Schlee. Porto Alegre, IEL/CELPCYRO.
