= List of international goals scored by Neymar =

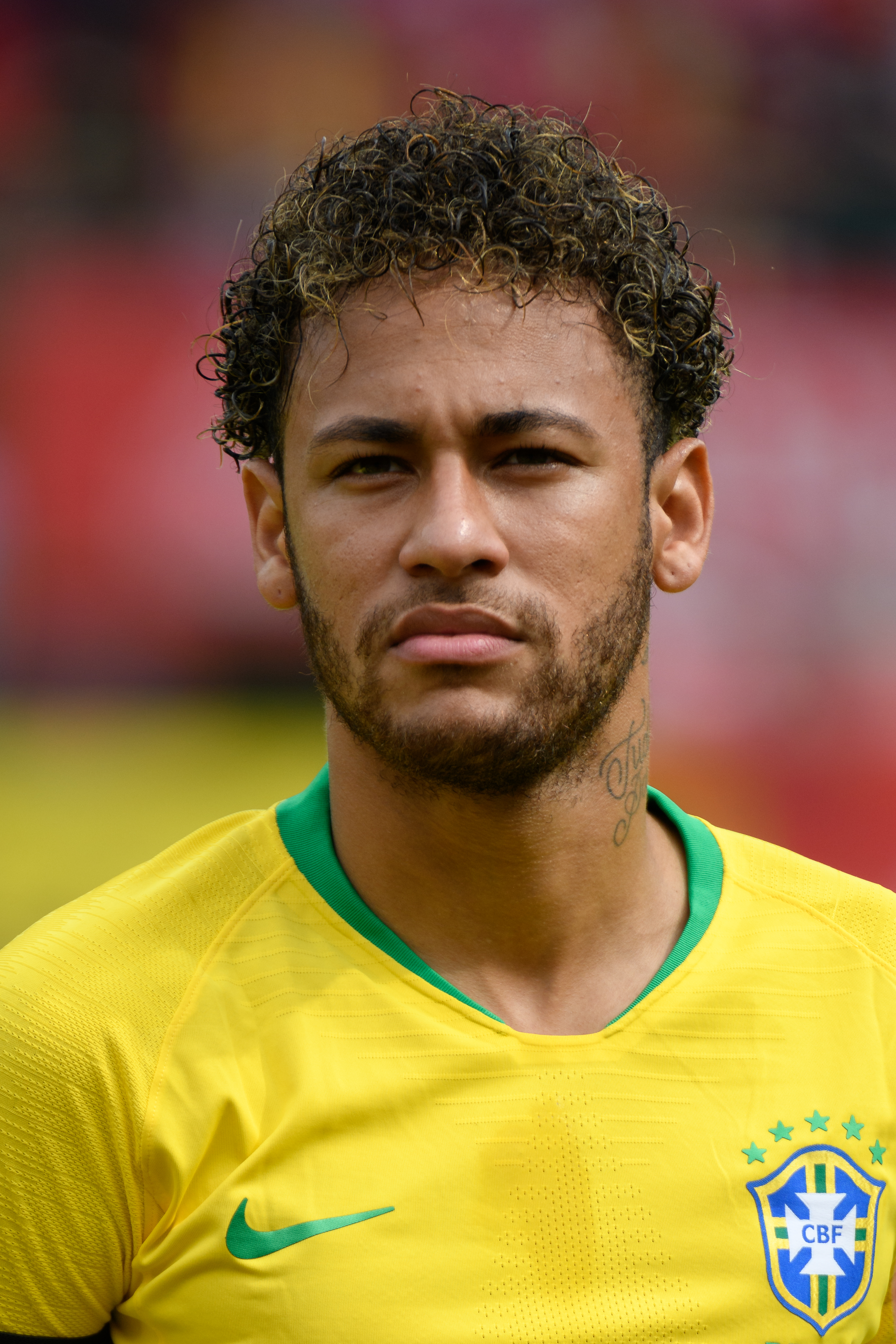
Neymar (pictured in 2018) scored 80 goals in 130 caps for Brazil between his debut 2010 and his final game in 2026.

Neymar is a Brazilian professional footballer who played as a forward on the Brazil national team from 2010 until 2026. Since scoring on his debut for the Seleção against the United States on 10 August 2010, Neymar went on to record 80 goals in 130 international appearances, making him Brazil's all-time top scorer. He surpassed second-placed Ronaldo's total of 62 goals with a hat-trick in a 2022 FIFA World Cup qualification match against Peru on 14 October 2020, and claimed the top spot from Pelé after recording his 78th and 79th goals in a 2026 World Cup qualifier against Bolivia on 9 September 2023. Neymar is also currently the eleventh-highest top scorer in men's international football all time.

Neymar has scored four international hat-tricks, and netted twice in a match (known as a brace) on nine occasions, with his first hat-trick coming in an 8–0 friendly win over China on 10 September 2012. He has scored nine times against Japan, making them the side he has gotten the most goals against; this total includes the four he scored during a single match in October 2015, which made Neymar the youngest player to score four goals in a game for Brazil, at the age of 22.

Neymar has scored the majority of his goals in friendlies, with them making up 46 of his overall tally. He has scored five times at the Copa América and 29 times in FIFA competitions, which include the FIFA World Cup finals, FIFA World Cup qualifiers and the FIFA Confederations Cup.

Neymar's first senior international tournament was the 2011 Copa América, where he scored two goals for Brazil. He played in his first senior FIFA tournament two years later, when he starred for hosts Brazil in the 2013 FIFA Confederations Cup. Neymar scored four goals throughout the campaign, including in the final against Spain, helping Brazil to a 3–0 victory. Neymar received the Bronze Shoe for his four goals, and was awarded with the Golden Ball for his standout performances throughout the tournament. Neymar played at his first FIFA World Cup in 2014, where he scored four goals, placing himself as the joint-third top scorer of the competition alongside his club teammate Lionel Messi and Dutch forward Robin van Persie. He also scored 9 goals in FIFA World Cup tournaments; he scored four goals in 2014, two in 2018, two in 2022 and one in 2026.

== Goals ==
Scores and results list Brazil's goal tally first, score column indicates score after each Neymar goal.

Table key
‡	Indicates goal was scored from a penalty kick
	Indicates Brazil won the match
	Indicates the match ended in a draw (a penalty shootout is recorded as a draw regardless of shootout results)
	Indicates Brazil lost the match

No.	Cap	Date	Venue	Opponent	Score	Result	Competition	Ref.
1	1	10 August 2010	New Meadowlands Stadium, East Rutherford, United States	United States	1–0	2–0	Friendly	
2	3	27 March 2011	Emirates Stadium, London, England	Scotland	1–0	2–0	Friendly	
3	3	27 March 2011	Emirates Stadium, London, England	Scotland	2–0‡	2–0	Friendly	
4	8	13 July 2011	Estadio Mario Alberto Kempes, Córdoba, Argentina	Ecuador	2–1	4–2	2011 Copa América	
5	8	13 July 2011	Estadio Mario Alberto Kempes, Córdoba, Argentina	Ecuador	4–2	4–2	2011 Copa América	
6	10	10 August 2011	Mercedes-Benz Arena, Stuttgart, Germany	Germany	2–3	2–3	Friendly	
7	13	28 September 2011	Mangueirão, Belém, Brazil	Argentina	2–0	2–0	2011 Superclásico de las Américas	
8	14	8 October 2011	Costa Rica National Stadium, San José, Costa Rica	Costa Rica	1–0	1–0	Friendly	
9	17	30 May 2012	FedExField, Landover, United States	United States	1–0‡	4–1	Friendly	
10	22	10 September 2012	Estádio do Arruda, Recife, Brazil	China	2–0	8–0	Friendly	
11	22	10 September 2012	Estádio do Arruda, Recife, Brazil	China	5–0	8–0	Friendly	
12	22	10 September 2012	Estádio do Arruda, Recife, Brazil	China	6–0	8–0	Friendly	
13	23	19 September 2012	Estádio Serra Dourada, Goiânia, Brazil	Argentina	2–1‡	2–1	2012 Superclásico de las Américas	
14	24	11 October 2012	Swedbank Stadion, Malmö, Sweden	Iraq	5–0	6–0	Friendly	
15	25	16 October 2012	Wrocław Stadium, Wrocław, Poland	Japan	2–0	4–0	Friendly	
16	25	16 October 2012	Wrocław Stadium, Wrocław, Poland	Japan	3–0	4–0	Friendly	
17	26	15 November 2012	MetLife Stadium, East Rutheford, United States	Colombia	1–1	1–1	Friendly	
18	31	6 April 2013	Estadio Ramón Tahuichi Aguilera, Santa Cruz de la Sierra, Bolivia	Bolivia	2–0	4–0	Friendly	
19	31	6 April 2013	Estadio Ramón Tahuichi Aguilera, Santa Cruz de la Sierra, Bolivia	Bolivia	3–0	4–0	Friendly	
20	32	24 April 2013	Mineirão, Belo Horizonte, Brazil	Chile	2–1	2–2	Friendly	
21	35	15 June 2013	Estádio Nacional Mané Garrincha, Brasília, Brazil	Japan	1–0	3–0	2013 FIFA Confederations Cup	
22	36	19 June 2013	Estádio Castelão, Fortaleza, Brazil	Mexico	1–0	2–0	2013 FIFA Confederations Cup	
23	37	22 June 2013	Itaipava Arena Fonte Nova, Salvador, Brazil	Italy	2–1	4–2	2013 FIFA Confederations Cup	
24	39	30 June 2013	Maracanã Stadium, Rio de Janeiro, Brazil	Spain	2–0	3–0	2013 FIFA Confederations Cup final	
25	41	7 September 2013	Estádio Nacional Mané Garrincha, Brasília, Brazil	Australia	3–0	6–0	Friendly	
26	42	10 September 2013	Gillette Stadium, Foxborough, United States	Portugal	2–1	3–1	Friendly	
27	43	12 October 2013	Seoul World Cup Stadium, Seoul, South Korea	South Korea	1–0	2–0	Friendly	
28	47	5 March 2014	FNB Stadium, Johannesburg, South Africa	South Africa	2–0	5–0	Friendly	
29	47	5 March 2014	FNB Stadium, Johannesburg, South Africa	South Africa	3–0	5–0	Friendly	
30	47	5 March 2014	FNB Stadium, Johannesburg, South Africa	South Africa	5–0	5–0	Friendly	
31	48	3 June 2014	Estádio Serra Dourada, Goiânia, Brazil	Panama	1–0	4–0	Friendly	
32	50	12 June 2014	Arena Corinthians, São Paulo, Brazil	Croatia	1–1	3–1	2014 FIFA World Cup	
33	50	12 June 2014	Arena Corinthians, São Paulo, Brazil	Croatia	2–1‡	3–1	2014 FIFA World Cup	
34	52	23 June 2014	Estádio Nacional Mané Garrincha, Brasília, Brazil	Cameroon	1–0	4–1	2014 FIFA World Cup	
35	52	23 June 2014	Estádio Nacional Mané Garrincha, Brasília, Brazil	Cameroon	2–1	4–1	2014 FIFA World Cup	
36	55	5 September 2014	Hard Rock Stadium, Miami Gardens, United States	Colombia	1–0	1–0	Friendly	
37	58	14 October 2014	National Stadium, Kallang, Singapore	Japan	1–0	4–0	Friendly	
38	58	14 October 2014	National Stadium, Kallang, Singapore	Japan	2–0	4–0	Friendly	
39	58	14 October 2014	National Stadium, Kallang, Singapore	Japan	3–0	4–0	Friendly	
40	58	14 October 2014	National Stadium, Kallang, Singapore	Japan	4–0	4–0	Friendly	
41	59	12 November 2014	Şükrü Saracoğlu Stadium, Istanbul, Turkey	Turkey	1–0	4–0	Friendly	
42	59	12 November 2014	Şükrü Saracoğlu Stadium, Istanbul, Turkey	Turkey	4–0	4–0	Friendly	
43	61	26 March 2015	Stade de France, Saint-Denis, France	France	2–1	3–1	Friendly	
44	64	14 June 2015	Estadio Municipal Germán Becker, Temuco, Chile	Peru	1–1	2–1	2015 Copa América	
45	67	8 September 2015	Gillette Stadium, Foxborough, United States	United States	2–0‡	4–1	Friendly	
46	67	8 September 2015	Gillette Stadium, Foxborough, United States	United States	4–0	4–1	Friendly	
47	71	1 September 2016	Atahualpa Olympic Stadium, Quito, Ecuador	Ecuador	1–0‡	3–0	2018 FIFA World Cup qualification	
48	72	6 September 2016	Arena da Amazônia, Manaus, Brazil	Colombia	2–1	2–1	2018 FIFA World Cup qualification	
49	73	6 October 2016	Arena das Dunas, Natal, Brazil	Bolivia	1–0	5–0	2018 FIFA World Cup qualification	
50	74	10 November 2016	Mineirão, Belo Horizonte, Brazil	Argentina	2–0	3–0	2018 FIFA World Cup qualification	
51	76	23 March 2017	Estadio Centenario, Montevideo, Uruguay	Uruguay	3–1	4–1	2018 FIFA World Cup qualification	
52	77	27 March 2017	Arena Corinthians, São Paulo, Brazil	Paraguay	2–0	3–0	2018 FIFA World Cup qualification	
53	82	10 November 2017	Stade Pierre-Mauroy, Villeneuve-d'Ascq, France	Japan	1–0	3–1	Friendly	
54	84	3 June 2018	Anfield, Liverpool, England	Croatia	1–0	2–0	Friendly	
55	85	10 June 2018	Ernst-Happel-Stadion, Vienna, Austria	Austria	2–0	3–0	Friendly	
56	87	22 June 2018	Krestovsky Stadium, Saint Petersburg, Russia	Costa Rica	2–0	2–0	2018 FIFA World Cup	
57	89	2 July 2018	Solidarnost Samara Arena, Samara, Russia	Mexico	1–0	2–0	2018 FIFA World Cup	
58	91	7 September 2018	MetLife Stadium, East Rutherford, United States	United States	2–0‡	2–0	Friendly	
59	92	11 September 2018	Northwest Stadium, Landover, United States	El Salvador	1–0‡	5–0	Friendly	
60	95	16 November 2018	Emirates Stadium, London, England	Uruguay	1–0	1–0	Friendly	
61	98	6 September 2019	Hard Rock Stadium, Miami Gardens, United States	Colombia	2–2	2–2	Friendly	
62	103	13 October 2020	National Stadium of Peru, Lima, Peru	Peru	1–1‡	4–2	2022 FIFA World Cup qualification	
63	103	13 October 2020	National Stadium of Peru, Lima, Peru	Peru	3–2‡	4–2	2022 FIFA World Cup qualification	
64	103	13 October 2020	National Stadium of Peru, Lima, Peru	Peru	4–2	4–2	2022 FIFA World Cup qualification	
65	104	4 June 2021	Estádio Beira-Rio, Porto Alegre, Brazil	Ecuador	2–0‡	2–0	2022 FIFA World Cup qualification	
66	105	8 June 2021	Estadio Defensores del Chaco, Asunción, Paraguay	Paraguay	1–0	2–0	2022 FIFA World Cup qualification	
67	106	13 June 2021	Estádio Nacional Mané Garrincha, Brasília, Brazil	Venezuela	2–0‡	3–0	2021 Copa América	
68	107	17 June 2021	Estádio Olímpico Nilton Santos, Rio de Janeiro, Brazil	Peru	2–0	4–0	2021 Copa América	
69	113	9 September 2021	Arena Pernambuco, São Lourenço da Mata, Brazil	Peru	2–0	2–0	2022 FIFA World Cup qualification	
70	115	14 October 2021	Arena da Amazônia, Manaus, Brazil	Uruguay	1–0	4–1	2022 FIFA World Cup qualification	
71	117	24 March 2022	Maracanã Stadium, Rio de Janeiro, Brazil	Chile	1–0‡	4–0	2022 FIFA World Cup qualification	
72	118	2 June 2022	Seoul World Cup Stadium, Seoul, South Korea	South Korea	2–1‡	5–1	Friendly	
73	118	2 June 2022	Seoul World Cup Stadium, Seoul, South Korea	South Korea	3–1‡	5–1	Friendly	
74	119	6 June 2022	Japan National Stadium, Tokyo, Japan	Japan	1–0‡	1–0	Friendly	
75	121	27 September 2022	Parc des Princes, Paris, France	Tunisia	3–1‡	5–1	Friendly	
76	123	5 December 2022	Stadium 974, Doha, Qatar	South Korea	2–0‡	4–1	2022 FIFA World Cup	
77	124	9 December 2022	Education City Stadium, Al Rayyan, Qatar	Croatia	1–0	1–1 (a.e.t.) (2–4 p)	2022 FIFA World Cup	
78	125	8 September 2023	Mangueirão, Belém, Brazil	Bolivia	4–0	5–1	2026 FIFA World Cup qualification	
79	125	8 September 2023	Mangueirão, Belém, Brazil	Bolivia	5–1	5–1	2026 FIFA World Cup qualification	
80	130	5 July 2026	MetLife Stadium, East Rutherford, United States	Norway	1–2‡	1–2	2026 FIFA World Cup	

== Hat-tricks ==
No.	Opponent	Goals	Score	Venue	Competition	Date	Ref.
1	China	3 (1–0, 5–0, 6–0)	8–0	Estádio do Arruda, Recife, Brazil	Friendly	10 September 2012	
2	South Africa	3 (2–0, 3–0, 5–0)	5–0	FNB Stadium, Johannesburg, South Africa	Friendly	5 March 2014	
3	Japan	4 (1–0, 2–0, 3–0, 4–0)	4–0	National Stadium, Kallang, Singapore	Friendly	14 October 2014	
4	Peru	3 (1–1, 3–2, 4–2)	4–2	Estadio Nacional, Lima, Peru	2022 FIFA World Cup qualification	13 October 2020	

== Statistics ==
As of match played 5 July 2026

Appearances and goals by year and competition
Year	Competitive		Friendly		Total	
Year	Apps	Goals	Apps	Goals	Apps	Goals
2010	–		2	1	2	1
2011	4 (Note: Appearances in 2011 Copa América)	2	9	5	13	7
2012	–		12	9	12	9
2013	5 (Note: Appearances in 2013 FIFA Confederations Cup)	4	14	6	19	10
2014	5 (Note: Appearances in 2014 FIFA World Cup)	4	9	11	14	15
2015	4 (Note: Two appearances and one goal in 2015 Copa América, two appearances in 2018 FIFA World Cup qualification)	1	5	3	9	4
2016	6 (Note: Appearances in 2018 FIFA World Cup qualification)	4	0	0	6	4
2017	6	2	2	1	8	3
2018	5 (Note: Appearances in 2018 FIFA World Cup)	2	8	5	13	7
2019	–		5	1	5	1
2020	2 (Note: Appearances in 2022 FIFA World Cup qualification)	3	0	0	2	3
2021	13 (Note: Seven appearances and four goals in 2022 FIFA World Cup qualification, six appearances and two goals in 2021 Copa América)	6	0	0	13	6
2022	4 (Note: One appearance and one goal in 2022 FIFA World Cup qualification, three appearances and two goals in 2022 FIFA World Cup)	3	4	4	8	7
2023	4 (Note: Appearances in 2026 FIFA World Cup qualification)	2	0	0	4	2
2024	–		–		–	
2025	–		–		–	
2026	2 (Note: Appearances in 2026 FIFA World Cup)	1	0	0	2	1
Total	60	34	70	46	130	80

Goals by competition
Competition	Apps	Goals
Friendlies	70	46
Copa América	12	5
FIFA Confederations Cup	5	4
FIFA World Cup qualification	28	16
FIFA World Cup	15	9
Total	130	80

Goals by confederation
Confederation	Teams	Goals
CONMEBOL	9	30
AFC	5	18
UEFA	10	15
CONCACAF	5	11
CAF	3	6
Total	32	80

Goals by opponent
Opponent	Goals
Japan	9
Peru	6
Bolivia	5
United States	5
Colombia	4
Croatia	4
Ecuador	4
South Korea	4
Argentina	3
China	3
South Africa	3
Uruguay	3
Cameroon	2
Chile	2
Costa Rica	2
Mexico	2
Paraguay	2
Scotland	2
Turkey	2
Australia	1
Austria	1
El Salvador	1
France	1
Germany	1
Iraq	1
Italy	1
Norway	1
Panama	1
Portugal	1
Spain	1
Tunisia	1
Venezuela	1
Total	80

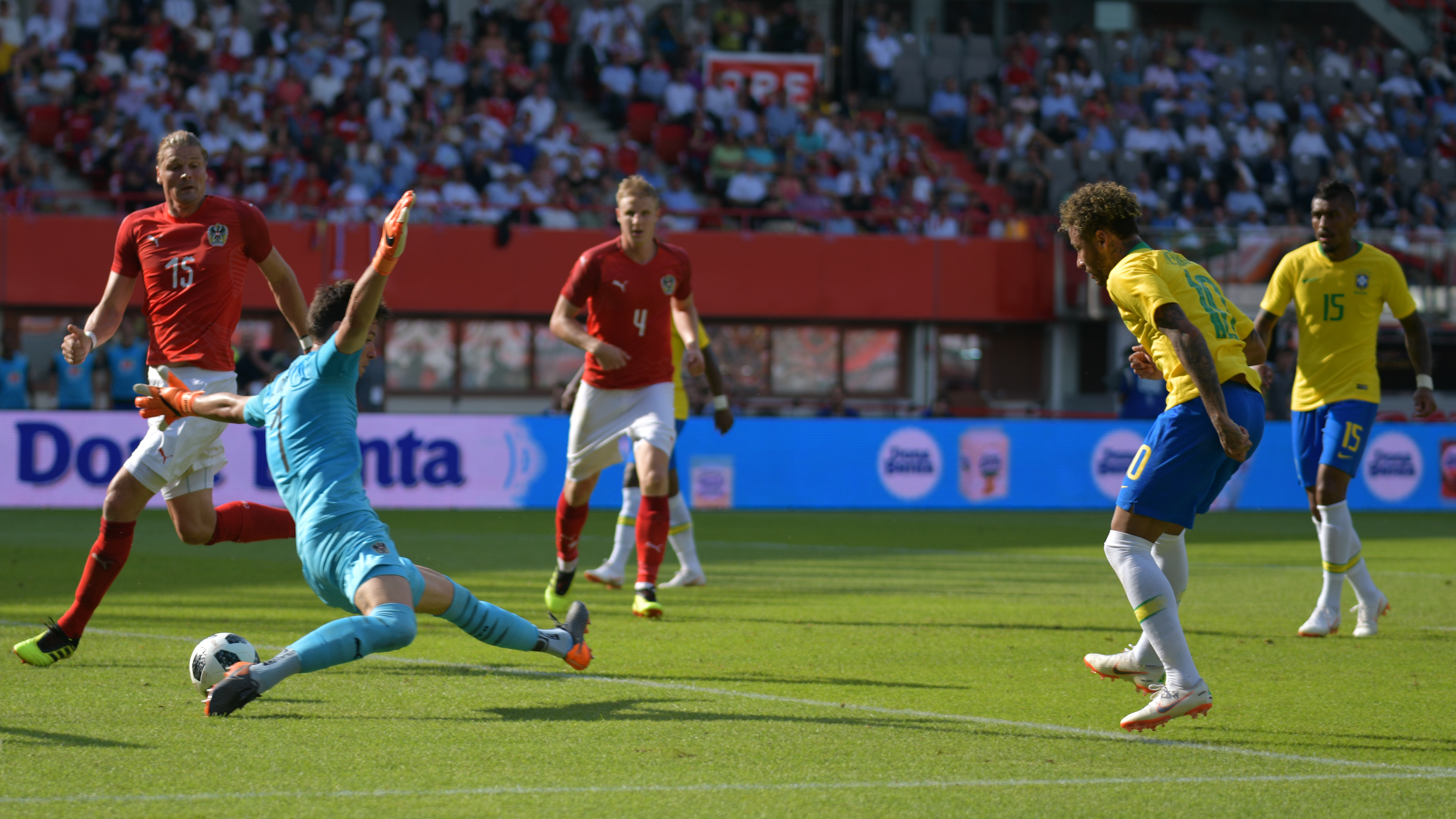
Neymar (second from right) scoring against Austria in 2018

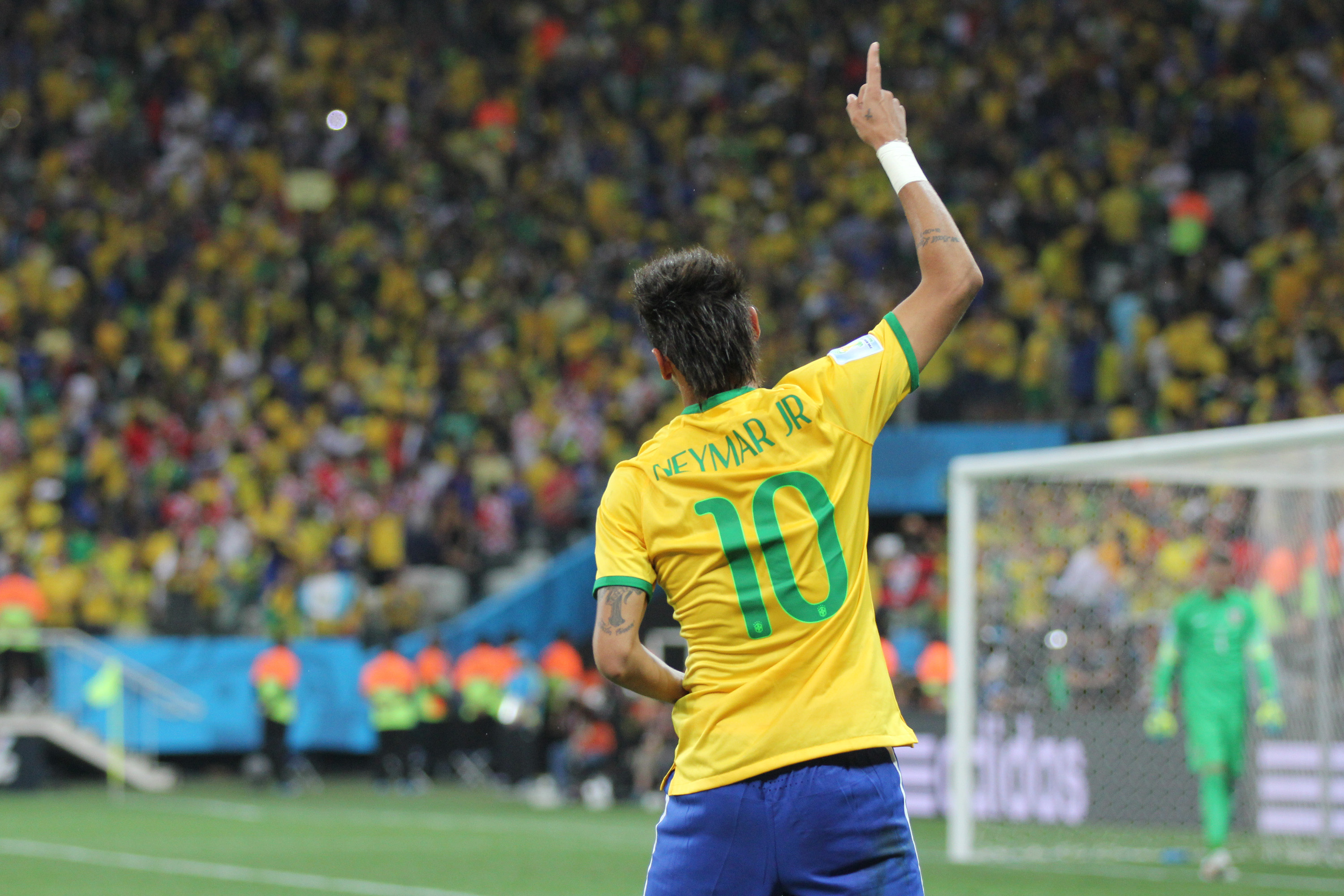
Neymar celebrating a goal against Croatia at the 2014 FIFA World Cup

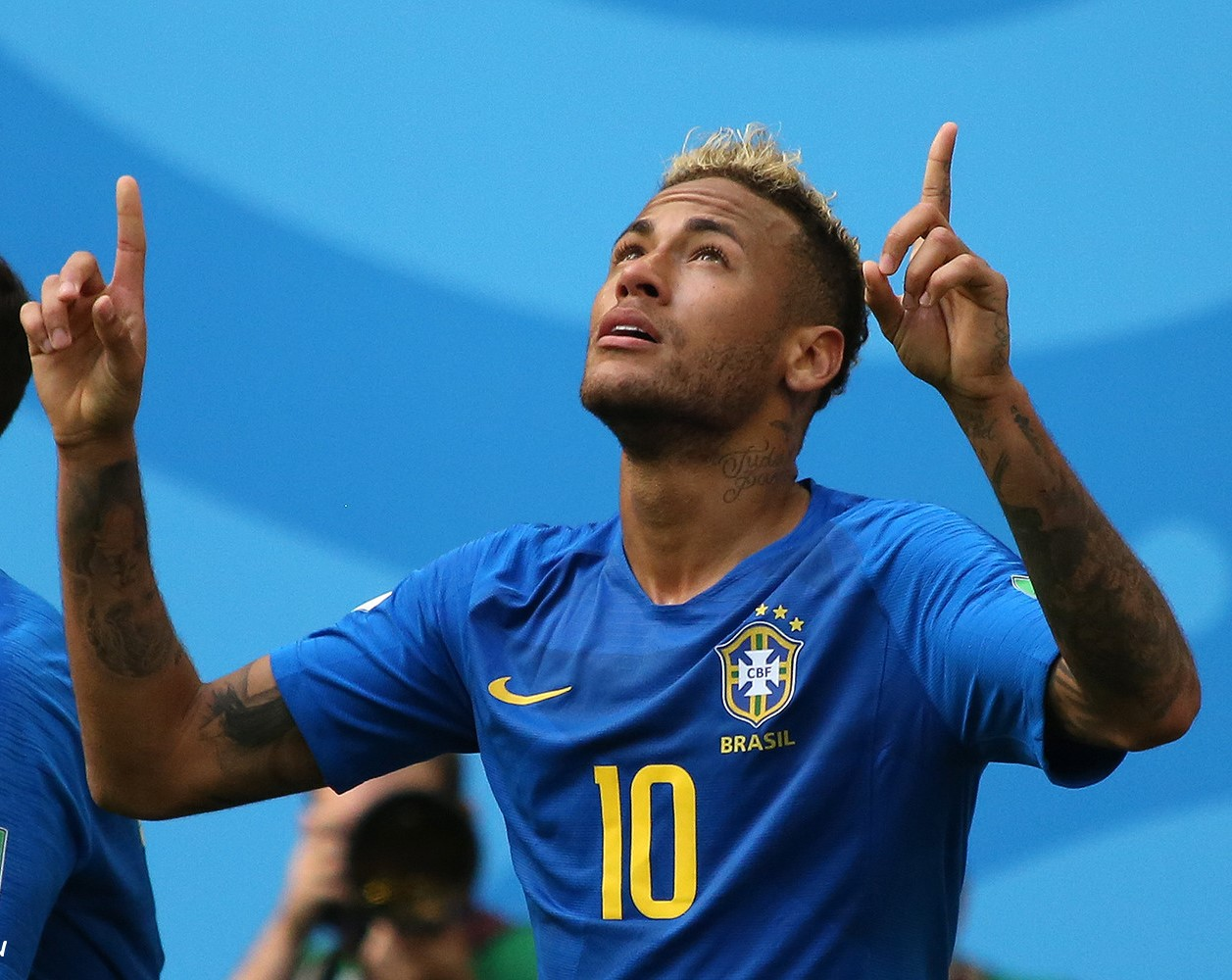
Neymar celebrates his goal against Costa Rica at the 2018 FIFA World Cup.

== See also ==
- List of men's footballers with 100 or more international caps
- List of men's footballers with 50 or more international goals
- List of most expensive association football transfers
- List of International goals scored by Pelé
