= Brazil at the 1990 FIFA World Cup =

Matches of the Brazil national football team in the 1990 FIFA World Cup

The Brazil national football team played in the 1990 FIFA World Cup, and continued to maintained their record of being the only team to enter every World Cup Finals.

The team was coached by Sebastião Lazaroni and the captain was Ricardo Gomes, a defender from Benfica. The Brazilian team used the 3-5-2 formation for the first time in its history and ended up in 9th place.

Brazil played until the Last 16 stage, where they were defeated by Argentina.

== Qualifying ==
1990 FIFA World Cup qualification (CONMEBOL Group 3)

July 30, 1989, Caracas, Venezuela - Venezuela 0 - 4 Brazil

August 30, 1989, Santiago, Chile - Chile 1 - 1 Brazil

August 20, 1989, São Paulo, Brazil - Brazil 6 - 0 Venezuela

September 3, 1989, Rio de Janeiro, Brazil - Brazil 2 - 0 Chile

	Pld	W	D	L	GF	GA	GD	Pts
Brazil	4	3	1	0	13	1	+12	7
Chile	4	2	1	1	9	4	+5	5
Venezuela	4	0	0	4	1	18	−17	0

Brazil qualified.

== The Cup ==
=== Group stage ===
Group C

Team	Pld	W	D	L	GF	GA	GD	Pts
Brazil	3	3	0	0	4	1	+3	6
Costa Rica	3	2	0	1	3	2	+1	4
Scotland	3	1	0	2	2	3	−1	2
Sweden	3	0	0	3	3	6	−3	0

10 June 1990
21:00

Brazil	2 – 1	Sweden
Careca 40', 63'	Report	Brolin 79'

Stadio Delle Alpi, Turin
Attendance: 62,628
Referee: Tullio Lanese (Italy)

16 June 1990
17:00

Brazil	1 – 0	Costa Rica
Müller 33'	Report

Stadio Delle Alpi, Turin
Attendance: 58,007
Referee: Neji Jouini (Tunisia)

20 June 1990
21:00

Brazil	1 – 0	Scotland
Müller 82'	Report

Stadio Delle Alpi, Turin
Attendance: 62,502
Referee: Helmut Kohl (Austria)

=== Knockout stage ===
Last 16

24 June 1990
17:00

Brazil	0 – 1	Argentina
	Report	Caniggia 80'

Stadio Delle Alpi, Turin
Attendance: 61,381
Referee: Joël Quiniou (France)

== Players ==
=== Squad ===
Head coach: Sebastião Lazaroni

No.	Pos.	Player	Date of birth (age)	Caps	Club
1	GK	Cláudio Taffarel	8 May 1966 (aged 24)	26	(Brazil) Internacional
2	DF	Jorginho	17 August 1964 (aged 25)	22	(West Germany) Bayer Leverkusen
3	DF	Ricardo Gomes (captain)	13 December 1964 (aged 25)	30	(Portugal) Benfica
4	MF	Dunga	31 October 1963 (aged 26)	21	(Italy) Fiorentina
5	MF	Alemão	22 November 1961 (aged 28)	32	(Italy) Napoli
6	DF	Branco	4 April 1964 (aged 26)	34	(Portugal) Porto
7	MF	Bismarck	11 September 1969 (aged 20)	10	(Brazil) Vasco da Gama
8	MF	Valdo	12 January 1964 (aged 26)	38	(Portugal) Benfica
9	FW	Careca	5 October 1960 (aged 29)	46	(Italy) Napoli
10	MF	Paulo Silas	27 August 1965 (aged 24)	29	(Portugal) Sporting CP
11	FW	Romário	29 January 1966 (aged 24)	24	(Netherlands) PSV
12	GK	Acácio	20 January 1959 (aged 31)	6	(Brazil) Vasco da Gama
13	DF	Carlos Mozer	19 September 1960 (aged 29)	27	(France) Marseille
14	DF	Aldair	30 November 1965 (aged 24)	18	(Portugal) Benfica
15	FW	Müller	31 January 1966 (aged 24)	31	(Italy) Torino
16	FW	Bebeto	16 February 1964 (aged 26)	26	(Brazil) Vasco da Gama
17	FW	Renato Gaúcho	9 September 1962 (aged 27)	23	(Brazil) Flamengo
18	DF	Mazinho	8 April 1966 (aged 24)	17	(Brazil) Vasco da Gama
19	DF	Ricardo Rocha	11 September 1962 (aged 27)	14	(Brazil) São Paulo
20	MF	Tita	1 April 1958 (aged 32)	31	(Brazil) Vasco da Gama
21	DF	Mauro Galvão	19 December 1961 (aged 28)	20	(Brazil) Botafogo
22	GK	Zé Carlos	7 February 1962 (aged 28)	3	(Brazil) Flamengo

=== Starting XI ===
No.	Pos.	Nat.	Name	MS	Notes
1	GK	(Brazil)	Taffarel	4	
2	RWB	(Brazil)	Jorginho	4	
3	CB	(Brazil)	R. Gomes	4	
21	CB	(Brazil)	Galvão	4	
19	CB	(Brazil)	R. Rocha	2	Mozer also had two starts
6	LWB	(Brazil)	Branco	4	
4	CM	(Brazil)	Dunga	4	
5	CM	(Brazil)	Alemão	4	
8	AM	(Brazil)	Valdo	4	
15	CF	(Brazil)	Müller	3	Romário had one start
9	CF	(Brazil)	Careca	4	

== Goalscorers ==
2 goals

- (Brazil) Careca
- (Brazil) Müller
