= Brazil national football team =

Men's association football team

Brazil
- Nicknames: Seleção (Note: Brazilian Portuguese pronunciation: [seleˈsɐ̃w], lit. 'selection'.); Canarinho (Note: Brazilian Portuguese pronunciation: [kanaˈɾiɲu], lit. 'little canary'.); Amarelinha (Note: Brazilian Portuguese pronunciation: [amaɾɛˈliɲɐ], lit. 'little yellow'.); Verde-Amarela (Note: Brazilian Portuguese pronunciation: [ˈveʁdʒi.amaˈɾɛlɐ], lit. 'green-yellow'.); O Maior do Mundo (Note: Brazilian Portuguese pronunciation: [ɐ majˈɔʁ du mũdu], lit. 'greatest in the world'.)
- Association: Confederação Brasileira de Futebol (CBF)
- Confederation: CONMEBOL (South America)
- Head coach: Carlo Ancelotti
- Captain: Marquinhos
- Most caps: Cafu (142)
- Top scorer: Neymar (80)
- Home stadium: Various
- FIFA code: BRA
First colours	Second colours

FIFA ranking
- Current: 7 ▼1 (18 November 2026)
- Highest: 1 (Note: September 1993 – November 1993; April 1994 – June 1994; July 1994 – May 2001; July 2002 – February 2007; July 2007 – September 2007; July 2009 – November 2009; April 2010 – July 2010; April 2017 – July 2017; August 2017 – September 2017; March 2022 – April 2023)
- Lowest: 22 (6 June 2013)

First international
- Argentina 3–0 Brazil (Buenos Aires, Argentina; 20 September 1914)

Biggest win
- Brazil 10–1 Bolivia (São Paulo, Brazil; 10 April 1949); Brazil 9–0 Colombia (Lima, Peru; 24 March 1957)

Biggest defeat
- Uruguay 6−0 Brazil (Viña del Mar, Chile; 18 September 1920); Brazil 1−7 Germany (Belo Horizonte, Brazil; 8 July 2014)

World Cup
- Appearances: 23 (first in 1930)
- Best result: Champions (1958, 1962, 1970, 1994, 2002)

Copa América
- Appearances: 38 (first in 1916)
- Best result: Champions (1919, 1922, 1949, 1989, 1997, 1999, 2004, 2007, 2019)

Panamerican Championship
- Appearances: 3 (first in 1952)
- Best result: Champions (1952, 1956)

CONCACAF Gold Cup
- Appearances: 3 (first in 1996)
- Best result: Runners-up (1996, 2003)

Confederations Cup
- Appearances: 7 (first in 1997)
- Best result: Champions (1997, 2005, 2009, 2013)
Medal record
FIFA World Cup
Gold medal – first place	1958 Sweden	Team
Gold medal – first place	1962 Chile	Team
Gold medal – first place	1970 Mexico	Team
Gold medal – first place	1994 United States	Team
Gold medal – first place	2002 Korea and Japan	Team
Silver medal – second place	1950 Brazil	Team
Silver medal – second place	1998 France	Team
Bronze medal – third place	1938 France	Team
Bronze medal – third place	1978 Argentina	Team
FIFA Confederations Cup
Gold medal – first place	1997 Saudi Arabia	Team
Gold medal – first place	2005 Germany	Team
Gold medal – first place	2009 South Africa	Team
Gold medal – first place	2013 Brazil	Team
Silver medal – second place	1999 Mexico	Team
Copa América
Gold medal – first place	1919 Brazil	Team
Gold medal – first place	1922 Brazil	Team
Gold medal – first place	1949 Brazil	Team
Gold medal – first place	1989 Brazil	Team
Gold medal – first place	1997 Bolivia	Team
Gold medal – first place	1999 Paraguay	Team
Gold medal – first place	2004 Peru	Team
Gold medal – first place	2007 Venezuela	Team
Gold medal – first place	2019 Brazil	Team
Silver medal – second place	1921 Argentina	Team
Silver medal – second place	1925 Argentina	Team
Silver medal – second place	1937 Argentina	Team
Silver medal – second place	1945 Chile	Team
Silver medal – second place	1946 Argentina	Team
Silver medal – second place	1953 Peru	Team
Silver medal – second place	1957 Peru	Team
Silver medal – second place	1959 Argentina	Team
Silver medal – second place	1983 South America	Team
Silver medal – second place	1991 Chile	Team
Silver medal – second place	1995 Uruguay	Team
Silver medal – second place	2021 Brazil	Team
Bronze medal – third place	1916 Argentina	Team
Bronze medal – third place	1917 Uruguay	Team
Bronze medal – third place	1920 Chile	Team
Bronze medal – third place	1942 Uruguay	Team
Bronze medal – third place	1959 Ecuador	Team
Bronze medal – third place	1975 South America	Team
Bronze medal – third place	1979 South America	Team
Panamerican Championship
Gold medal – first place	1952 Chile	Team
Gold medal – first place	1956 Mexico	Team
Silver medal – second place	1960 Costa Rica	Team
CONCACAF Gold Cup
Silver medal – second place	1996 United States	Team
Silver medal – second place	2003 United States and Mexico	Team
Bronze medal – third place	1998 United States	Team
Olympic Games
Silver medal – second place	1984 Los Angeles	Team
Silver medal – second place	1988 Seoul	Team
- Website: cbf.com.br/selecao-brasileira

The Brazil national football team (Portuguese: Seleção Brasileira de Futebol), (Note: Brazilian Portuguese pronunciation: [seleˈsɐ̃w bɾaziˈlejɾɐ dʒi futʃiˈbɔw].) nicknamed Canarinho, represents Brazil in men's international football and is administered by the Brazilian Football Confederation, the governing body of football in Brazil. It has been a member of FIFA since 1923 and was a founding member of CONMEBOL in 1916. It was also a member of PFC, the unified confederation of the Americas, from 1946 to 1961.

Brazil is the most successful national team in the FIFA World Cup, winning the tournament five times: 1958, 1962, 1970, 1994 and 2002. The Seleção also has the best overall performance in the World Cup competition with a record of 79 victories in 119 matches played and 135 goal difference. It is the only national team to have played in all World Cup editions without missing an edition or needing to qualify through play-offs, and the only team to have won the World Cup in four different continents. Brazil was the most successful team in the now-defunct FIFA Confederations Cup, with victories in 1997, 2005, 2009, and 2013.

Many commentators, football experts, and former players regard Brazil's 1970 World Cup-winning side as the greatest football team of all time. (Note: Attributed to multiple references:) Other Brazilian squads are also highly esteemed and regularly appear listed among the best teams of all time, such as the teams of 1958–62 and of 1994–02 period. (Note: Attributed to multiple references:) Brazil has developed many rivalries through the years, the most notable being with Argentina, Italy and Uruguay. (Note: Attributed to multiple references:)

In FIFA's ranking system, Brazil holds the record for most Team of the Year first ranking wins with 13. It also has the highest average Elo football rating over time.

== History ==
=== 1914–1929: Early history ===
Historical records indicate that Brazil's first-ever game was a 1914 match between a Rio de Janeiro and São Paulo select team and the English club Exeter City, held in the stadium of Fluminense FC. (Note: Attributed to multiple references:) Brazil won 2–0 with goals by Oswaldo Gomes and Osman Medeiros, (Note: Attributed to multiple references:) though it has also been claimed that the match was a 3–3 draw. In 1916, Brazil played its first matches against Chile and Uruguay.

Brazil achieved third place at the first two editions of the South American Championship—which would later become the Copa América—in 1916 and 1917. Led by the goalscoring abilities of Arthur Friedenreich, they were champions in the 1919 edition, which was held in their own country. Brazil finished third in 1920 and second in 1921. They won the 1922 championship, again on home soil, and achieved second place in 1925.

=== 1930–1949: First World Cup appearance and title drought ===
In 1930, Brazil played in the first FIFA World Cup, held in Uruguay. After losing to Yugoslavia and defeating Bolivia in the group stage, they were eliminated from the competition. Four years later, Brazil lost in the first round to Spain in the all-knockout 1934 World Cup in Italy.

After finishing second at the 1937 South American Championship, Brazil reached the semi-finals at the 1938 FIFA World Cup in France. They were eliminated by eventual champions Italy, but managed to achieve third place after defeating Sweden. Brazil was the only South American team to participate in the tournament; other teams held a boycott to protest the tournament being held in Europe twice in a row. During World War II, Brazil finished third in the 1942 South American Championship and second in the 1945 edition. After the war, Brazil achieved second place at the 1946 edition, and won their third title at the 1949 edition, held in Brazil. The victory ended the team's 27-year drought without a South American title.

=== 1950: World Cup and the Maracanazo ===
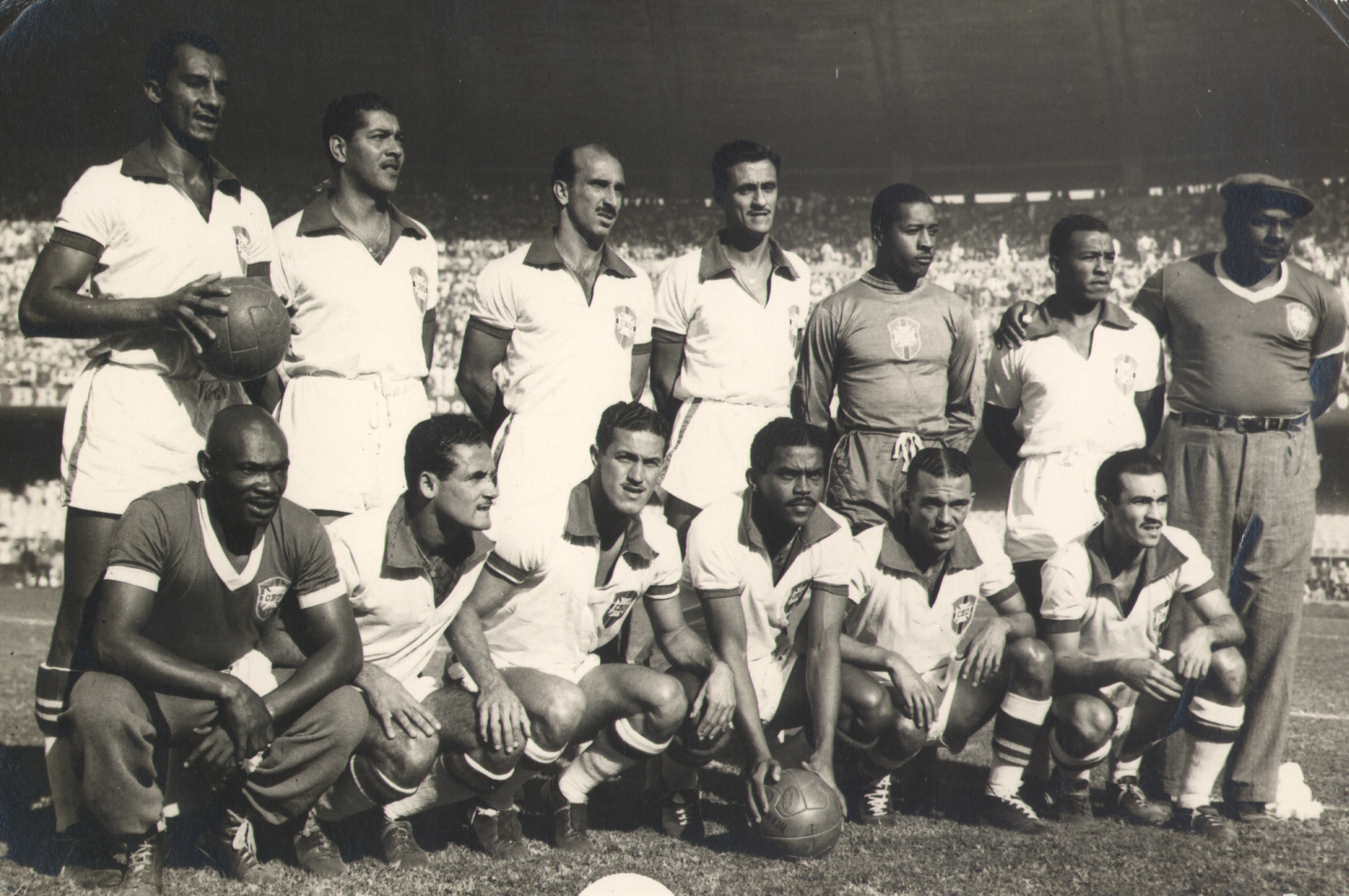
The Brazil national team at the 1950 World Cup

After World War II caused widespread destruction in Europe, Brazil's bid to host the 1950 FIFA World Cup went unopposed. During the tournament's group stage, Brazil defeated Mexico 4–0 at the Maracanã in Rio de Janeiro (then the Brazilian capital), tied with Switzerland 2–2 at the Pacaembu in São Paulo, and returned to the Maracanã to defeat Yugoslavia 2–0.

Unlike World Cup tournaments before and after, this edition had a final group stage to decide the champion. At this stage, Brazil defeated Sweden 7–1 and Spain 6–1. In the last game of the final round against Uruguay at the Maracanã, Brazil needed a win or draw to achieve a World Cup victory. Uruguay defeated Brazil 2–1, winning the World Cup in a game known as the Maracanazo. The defeat led to a period of national mourning in Brazil, and marked the end of the Brazil team wearing white as their default uniform.

=== 1951–1957: Modern uniform and the "Battle of Berne" ===
After the disappointment of the Maracanazo, Brazil finished second at the 1953 South American Championship in Peru. At the 1954 World Cup in Switzerland, Brazil debuted a new uniform designed by Aldyr Schlee. It featured yellow shirts with green details, blue shorts, and white socks, and is still used today. In Brazil's two group stage matches, they defeated Mexico 5–0 and tied with Yugoslavia 1–1. In the quarter-finals, Brazil lost 4–2 to Hungary in one of the ugliest matches in football history, known as the "Battle of Berne". Brazil did not play in the 1955 South American Championship, but finished fourth in 1956 and second in 1957.

=== 1958–1970: Pelé and the First Golden Era ===
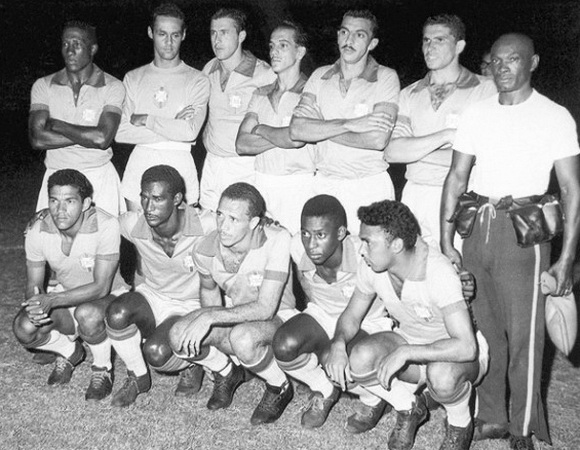
The Brazil national team at the 1959 Copa América

During the 1958 World Cup in Sweden, Brazil defeated Austria 3–0 in their first group match, then tied England 0–0. Before their third group match against the Soviet Union, coach Vicente Feola added Zito, Garrincha, and Pelé to the starting line-up. From the kick-off, Brazil applied relentless pressure; in his biography of Garrincha, Ruy Castro described the first three minutes of the match as "the greatest three minutes in the history of football". Vavá gave Brazil the lead, and they won the match 2–0. Pelé scored the only goal of their quarter-final victory over Wales, and Brazil defeated France 5–2 in the semi-final. Brazil then achieved a 5–2 victory over Sweden in the final, winning their first World Cup and becoming the first nation to win a World Cup outside of its own continent. Pelé described the moment as "a nation coming of age".

Brazil competed in two South American championships held in 1959. They finished second in the first tournament and third in the second tournament. At the 1962 World Cup in Chile, Brazil defeated Mexico 2–0 in their first group match, then tied 0–0 with Czechoslovakia. Pelé was injured during the second match and was unable to play for the rest of the tournament. Brazil then defeated Spain 2–1 in their final group stage match. Brazil eliminated England 3–1 in the quarter-finals, defeated Chile 4–2 in the semi-finals, and secured their second consecutive World Cup title with a 3–1 win in the final against Czechoslovakia.

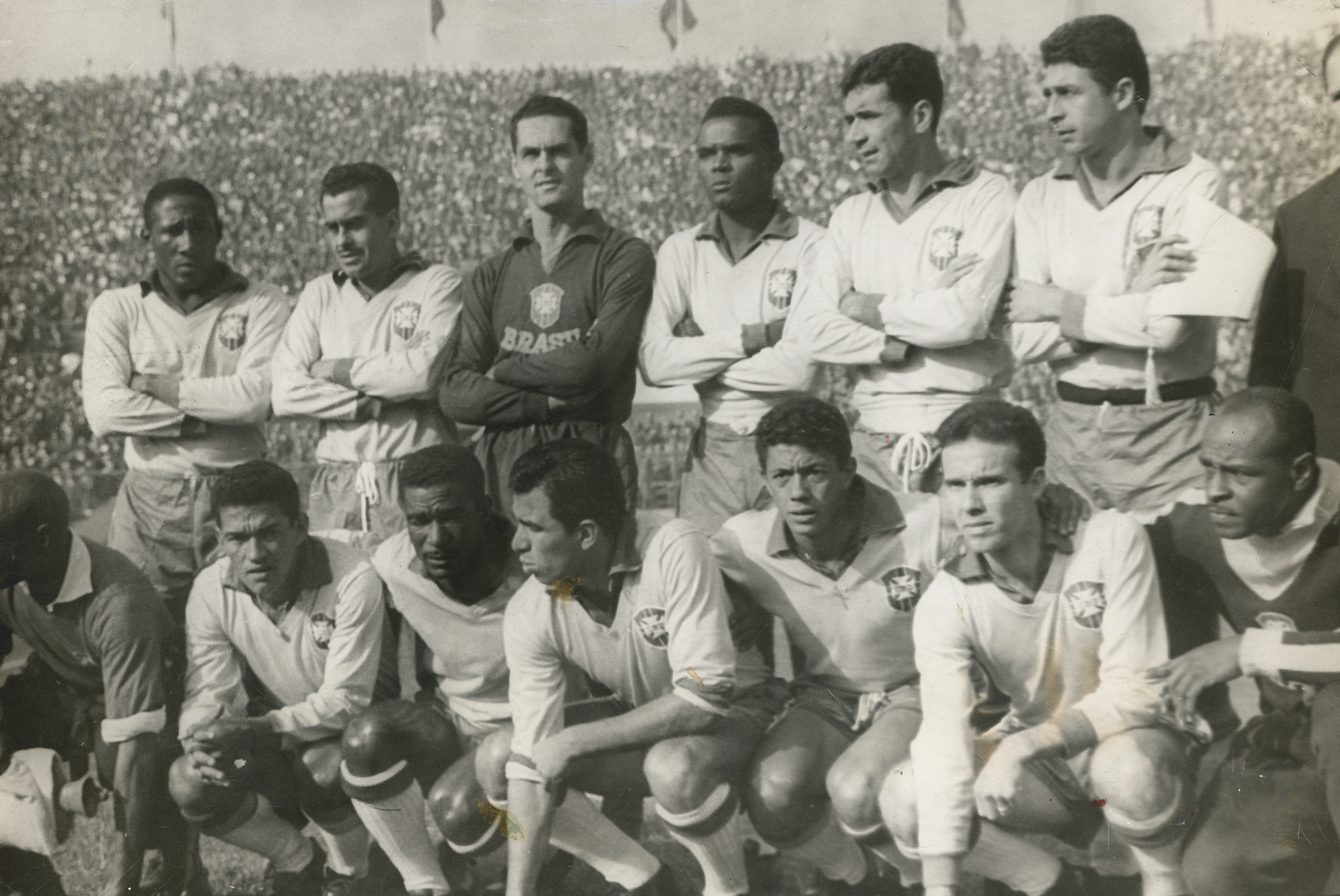
Defending champions Brazil at the 1962 FIFA World Cup

Brazil finished fourth at the 1963 South American Championship in Bolivia. The 1966 World Cup in England was Brazil's worst performance in a World Cup. They defeated Bulgaria 2–0, then lost to Hungary 3–1. The tournament was remembered for its aggressively physical play. Against Portugal, several violent tackles by Portuguese defenders caused Pelé to leave the match and the tournament. Brazil lost the match 3–1 and was eliminated in the first round of the World Cup for the first time since 1934. Afterwards, Pelé said he would not play in another World Cup. However, he ultimately returned in 1970.

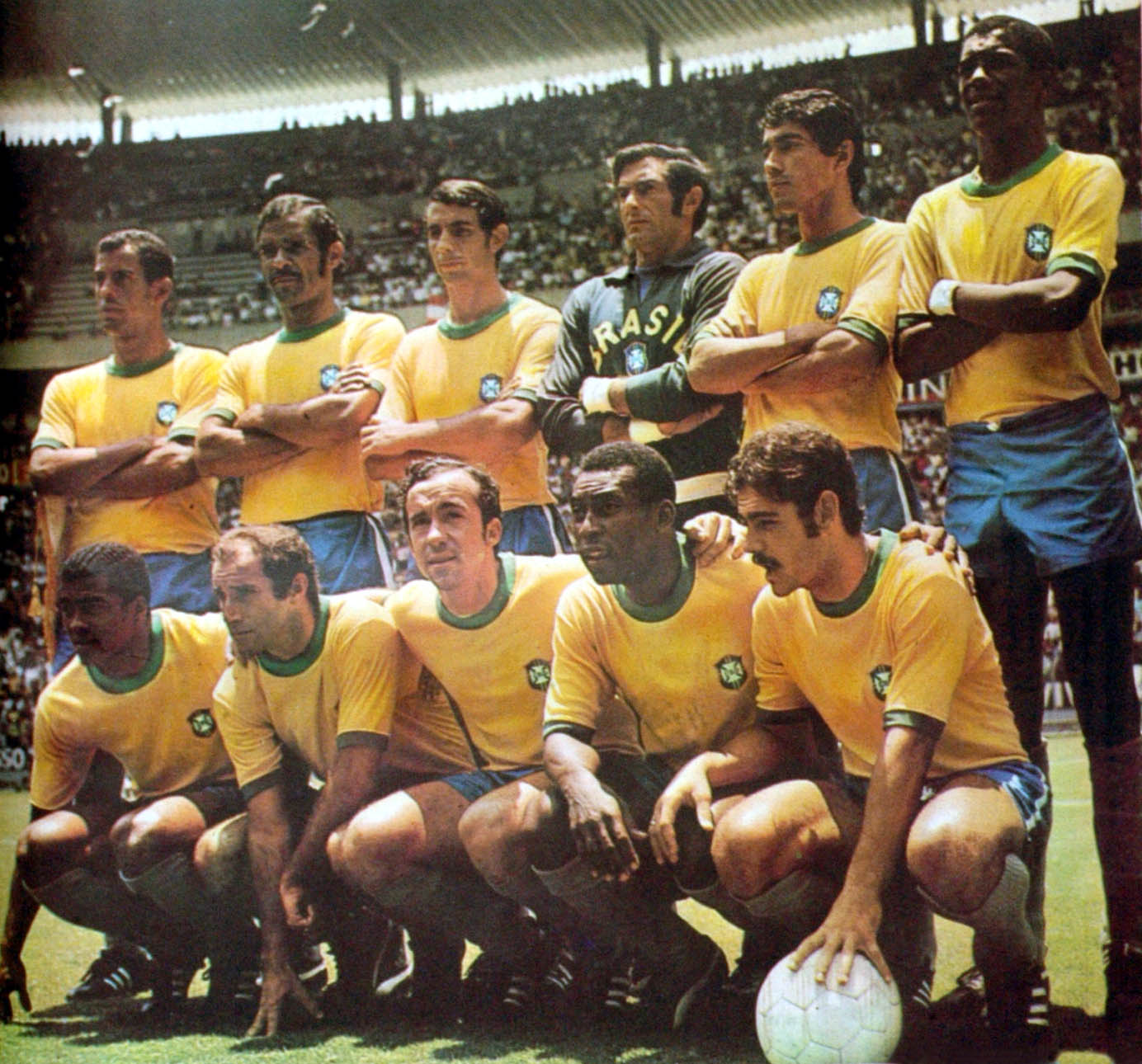
The 1970 FIFA World Cup-winning Brazil team, considered by many commentators as the greatest national football team ever

At the 1970 World Cup in Mexico, Brazil fielded what is widely considered the best World Cup squad in history. (Note: Attributed to multiple references:) It was led by Pelé, captain Carlos Alberto Torres, Jairzinho, Tostão, Gérson, and Rivellino. The team won all six of their games, starting with the group stage matches: 4–1 over Czechoslovakia, 1–0 over England (despite a famous save by Gordon Banks), and 3–2 over Romania. Brazil then won 4–2 against Peru in the quarter-finals, defeated Uruguay 3–1 in the semi-finals, and achieved a 4–1 victory over Italy in the final. Jairzinho finished as the tournament’s second-highest scorer with seven goals, scoring in all six of Brazil’s matches; Pelé scored four goals. Brazil became the first nation to lift the Jules Rimet trophy for the third time, which meant they were allowed to keep it. A replacement trophy was then commissioned, though it would be 24 years before Brazil won it again. The Jules Rimet trophy was stolen from the Confederação Brasileira de Futebol (CBF) in 1983 and was never recovered. CBF was later awarded a replica trophy.

=== 1971–1993: The first dry spell ===
After the retirement of Pelé and other stars from the 1970 squad, Brazil played at the 1974 World Cup in West Germany. Scoreless draws with Yugoslavia and Scotland were followed by a 3–0 win over Zaire during the first group stage, with Brazil finishing second in the group. During the second group stage, Brazil defeated East Germany 1–0 and Argentina 2–1, but lost 2–0 to the Netherlands. Brazil finished in fourth place after losing the third place game 1–0 to Poland.

Brazil finished third at the 1975 Copa América. At the 1978 World Cup in Argentina, Brazil tied Sweden 1-1, tied Spain 0-0 and defeated Austria 1–0 at the first group stage. Brazil finished second, the last time Brazil failed to win their group on the first stage. In the second group stage, Brazil defeated Peru 3–0, tied with tournament hosts Argentina 0-0, and defeated Poland 3–1. However, Argentina defeated Peru 6–0 in a match held later the same day, and thus Argentina qualified for the final in a match accused of ultimately-unproven match fixing at the expense of Brazil. Brazil subsequently beat Italy 2–1 in the third place play-off, and were the only team to remain unbeaten in the tournament.

Brazil then ended at third place at the 1979 Copa América, also without a single host country.

At the 1982 World Cup, held in Spain, Brazil were the tournament favorites, and easily moved through the first group stage, with a 2–1 win against the Soviet Union, a 4–1 victory against Scotland and a 4–0 thrashing of New Zealand. In the second group stage, Brazil defeated Argentina 3–1, but a 3–2 defeat in Barcelona to Italy, in a classic World Cup match, eliminated them from the tournament in the match that they refer to as "Sarriá's Tragedy", referencing the stadium's name. The 1982 team, with a midfield of Sócrates, Zico, Falcão and Toninho Cerezo, is remembered as perhaps the greatest team never to win a World Cup.

At the 1983 Copa América, the third and final tournament without a fixed host, Brazil lost the title to Uruguay and finished runners-up.

Several players, including Sócrates and Zico, from 1982 returned to play at the 1986 World Cup in Mexico. Brazil, still a very good team and more disciplined defensively than four years earlier, won the three group stage matches (1–0 against Spain, 1–0 against Algeria, and 3–0 against Northern Ireland), without conceding a goal. Then Brazil defeated Poland 4–0 in the round of 16, and in the quarter-finals Brazil faced the Michel Platini-led France in a classic of Total Football. The game played to a 1–1 draw in regulation time where Zico missed a penalty kick, and after a goalless extra time, it all came down to a penalty shoot-out, where Brazil was defeated 4–3.

Brazil finished fifth place at the 1987 Copa América held in Argentina, and in 1989, Brazil hosted and won the 1989 Copa América, thus ending Brazil's 19-year streak without an official title.

At the 1990 World Cup in Italy, Brazil was coached by Sebastião Lazaroni, who had been the coach in the 1989 Copa América. With a defensive scheme, whose main symbol was midfielder Dunga, forward Careca and three centre-backs, the team lacked creativity but made it to the second round after defeating Sweden 2–1, Costa Rica 1–0, and Scotland 1–0. Brazil was eliminated by Diego Maradona-led Argentina in the round of 16 in Turin, losing to their South American archrivals 1–0 thanks to a goal by Claudio Caniggia.

Brazil would struggle in the next cycle, as they finished runners-up at the 1991 Copa América held in Chile, losing the title to Argentina. In the 1993 Copa América held in Ecuador, Brazil was knocked out by Argentina on the quarter-finals on penalties.

=== 1994–2005: The Second Golden Era ===
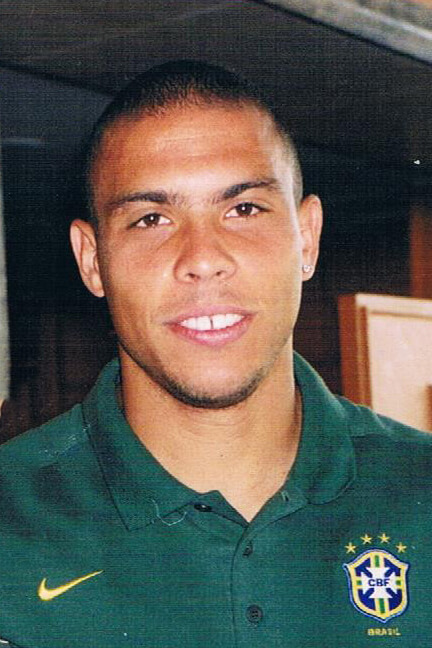
Brazil's Ronaldo in the 2002 FIFA World Cup

In the qualifiers for the 1994 World Cup, Brazil lost a qualifying match for the first time when Bolivia defeated the team 2–0 in La Paz. Brazil qualified for the tournament after defeating Uruguay at Maracanã with two Romário goals.

Brazil went 24 years without winning a World Cup or even participating in the World Cup final match. This drought ended at the 1994 tournament held in the United States, where a solid side headed by Romário and Bebeto in attack, captain Dunga in midfield, goalkeeper Cláudio Taffarel and defender Jorginho, won the World Cup for a then-record fourth time. Brazil started by defeating Russia 2–0, then winning 3–0 against Cameroon and tying with Sweden 1-1. Their campaign proceeded with a 1–0 victory over the United States in the round of 16 at Stanford Stadium on the 4th of July, a 3–2 win over the Netherlands in the quarter-finals in Dallas, and a 1–0 victory over Sweden in a rematch of the group stage match at the semi-finals at Pasadena's Rose Bowl. This set up Brazil–Italy in the final in Pasadena. A game played in searing heat ended as a goalless draw after extra time, with Italy's defence led by Franco Baresi keeping out Romário and Brazil's defence led by Cafu doing the same to Roberto Baggio, penalty kicks loomed and Brazil became champions with Baggio missing Italy's last penalty. Despite the triumph, the 1994 World Cup winning team is not held in the same high esteem in Brazil as their other World Cup winning teams. FourFourTwo magazine labelled the 1994 team "unloved" in Brazil due to their pragmatic, defensive style over the more typical Brazilian style of attacking flair, in spite of the players' individual status as idols (mainly Romário, who was known as a clinical striker and whose contributions to the team are widely regarded as responsible both for allowing the team to qualify following a rocky start and for winning the tournament).

In the meantime, Brazil lost the 1995 Copa América to hosts Uruguay on penalties, followed by victory in the 1997 tournament against Bolivia, the host of the latter tournament, after a 3–1 win, the first time Brazil won the Copa América held outside of Brazil. That same year, Brazil won the Confederations Cup in Saudi Arabia with a 6-0 win against Australia.

Entering the 1998 World Cup as defending champions, Brazil finished runner-up. Having topped their group after beating Scotland 2–1, defeating Morocco 3-0 and losing 2–1 to Norway, Brazil thrashed Chile 4–1 in the round of 16, defeated Denmark 3–2 in the quarter-finals, and then eliminated Netherlands on penalties in the semi-final following a 1–1 draw. Player of the tournament Ronaldo scored four goals and made three assists en route to the final. The build up to the final itself was overshadowed by Ronaldo suffering a convulsive fit only hours before kick off. The starting line up without Ronaldo was released to a shocked world media, but after pleading that he felt fine and requested to play, Ronaldo was reinstated by the coach, before giving a below par performance as France, led by Zidane, won 3-0.

Brazil won the 1999 Copa América held in Paraguay with a 3–0 win over Uruguay in the final, but lost the 1999 Confederations Cup final to hosts Mexico, before being eliminated from the 2001 Copa América held in Colombia in the quarter-finals with a 2–0 loss to Honduras. The team would also struggle in the 2002 World Cup qualifiers, only securing a spot on the final matchday with a 3–0 victory over Venezuela.

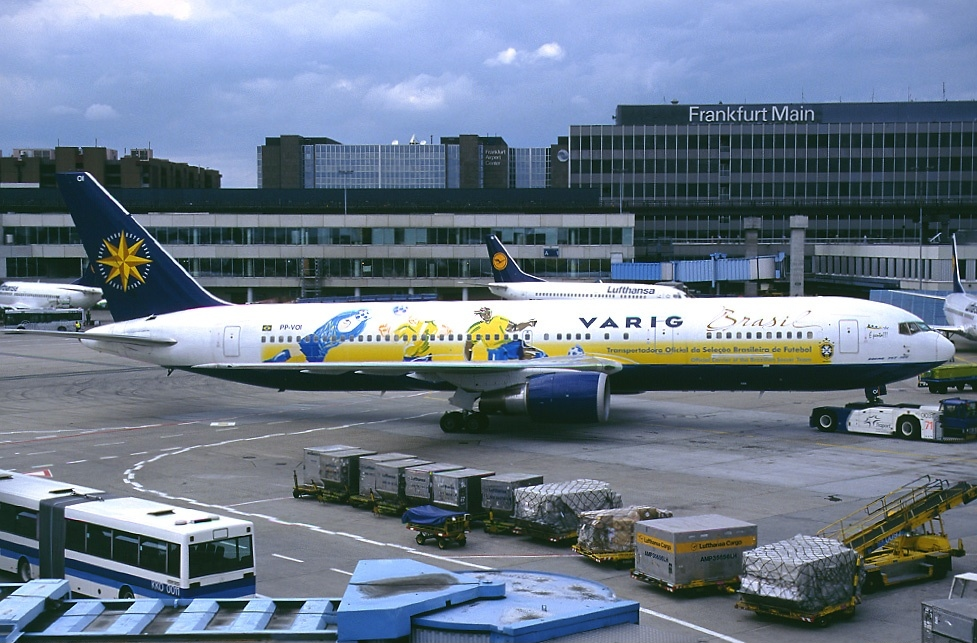
2002 World Cup-winning Brazil plane livery, from Varig.

However, the 2002 World Cup, co-hosted by South Korea and Japan, would be different, as Brazil topped their group with nine points and three wins. Brazil played the group stage in South Korea, and their first match was against Turkey, in Ulsan. In that match, Rivaldo fell to the ground clutching his face after Turkey's Hakan Ünsal had kicked the ball at his legs. Rivaldo escaped suspension but was fined £5,180 for play-acting, and became the first player ever to be punished in FIFA's crackdown on diving. Brazil came from behind to defeat the Turks 2–1. This was followed by a 4–0 win over China and a 5–2 victory against Costa Rica. For the knockout round matches, Brazil traveled to Japan, continuing their campaign by defeating Belgium 2–0 in Kobe. They then proceeded to defeat England 2–1 in the quarter-finals in Shizuoka, with the winning goal coming from a free-kick by Ronaldinho from 40 yards out, but Ronaldinho was also sent off that match. The semi-final was against Turkey in Saitama, a rematch of the group stage, with Brazil winning 1–0 to advance to their third consecutive final. The final was against Germany in Yokohama, where Ronaldo scored both goals in Brazil's 2–0 triumph. Ronaldo also won the Golden Shoe as the tournament's leading scorer with eight goals. Among the highlights of the campaign were the "Three R's" (Ronaldo, Rivaldo and Ronaldinho). 2002 was Brazil's fifth world championship, their last to date, with the success seeing them receive the Laureus World Sports Award for Team of the Year.

=== 2006–2026: The second dry spell ===
After their World Cup victory in Asia, Brazil won the 2004 Copa América in Peru, defeating Argentina on penalties after a 2–2 draw in the final, with a late goal by Adriano forcing the shootout. That was their third win in four competitions since 1997. They also won the FIFA Confederations Cup for the second time in 2005, with a 4–1 thumping of Argentina. Manager Carlos Alberto Parreira built his side through a 4–2–2–2 formation. Nicknamed the "Magic Quartet", the attack was built around four players: Ronaldo, Adriano, Kaká and Ronaldinho.

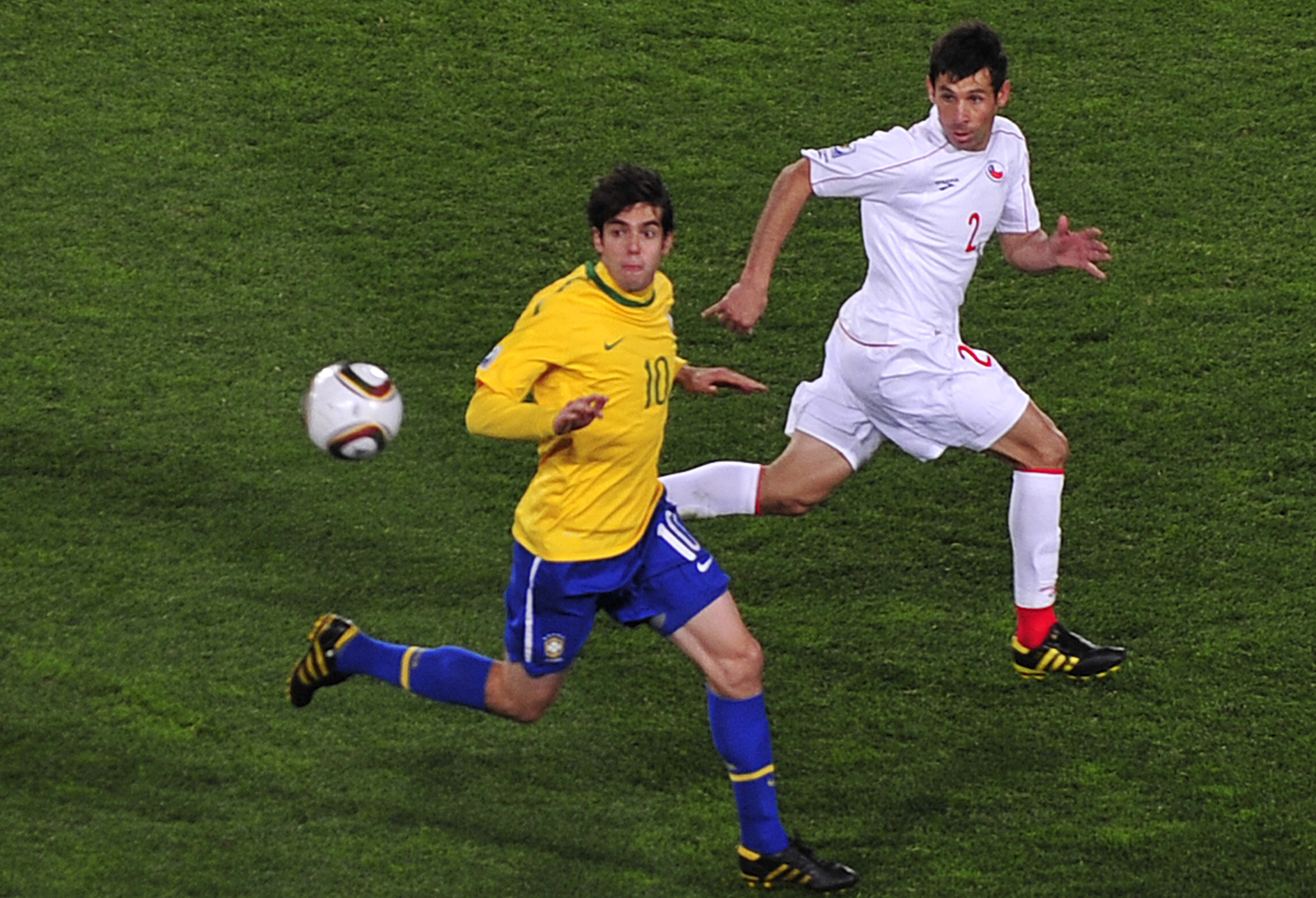
Brazil's Kaká against Chile at the 2010 FIFA World Cup in South Africa

In the 2006 World Cup held in Germany, Brazil won their three group games against Croatia (1–0), Australia (2–0) and Japan (4–1). Ronaldo scored twice and equalled the record for the most goals scored across all World Cups. In the round of 16, Brazil beat Ghana 3–0. Ronaldo's goal was his 15th in World Cup history, breaking the record, which would later be broken by Miroslav Klose in 2014. Brazil, however, were eliminated in the quarter-finals against France, a match involving several Brazilian and French players who had previously taken part in the 1998 FIFA World Cup Final, losing 1–0 to a Thierry Henry goal.

Dunga was appointed as Brazil's new team manager in 2006. Brazil then won the 2007 Copa América held in Venezuela, with a 3-0 win against Argentina in the final. Two years later, Brazil won the 2009 FIFA Confederations Cup, defeating the United States 3–2 in the final, to seal their third Confederations Cup title.

At the 2010 World Cup in South Africa, Brazil won their first two matches against North Korea (2–1) and the Ivory Coast (3–1), respectively. Their last match, against Portugal, ended in a 0–0 draw. They faced Chile in the round of 16, winning 3–0, although in the quarter-final they fell to the Netherlands 2–1.

In July 2010, Mano Menezes was named as Brazil's new coach. At the 2011 Copa América held in Argentina, Brazil lost against Paraguay on penalties and was eliminated in the quarter-finals. Brazil failed to score any penalty in the shootout. In November 2012, coach Mano Menezes was sacked and replaced by Luiz Felipe Scolari.

On 6 June 2013, Brazil was ranked 22nd in the FIFA World Rankings, their lowest ever. At the 2013 Confederations Cup, Brazil defended their title, beating Spain in the final, winning 3–0 and sealing their fourth Confederations Cup title.

==== 2014 FIFA World Cup disaster ====
In the opening match of the 2014 World Cup on home soil against Croatia, two goals from Neymar and one from Oscar sealed a 3–1 comeback win after a Marcelo own goal. The team then drew 0–0 with Mexico, before confirming qualification to the knockout stage by defeating Cameroon 4–1. Brazil faced Chile in the round of 16, needing penalties to prevail to the next round following a 1–1 draw.

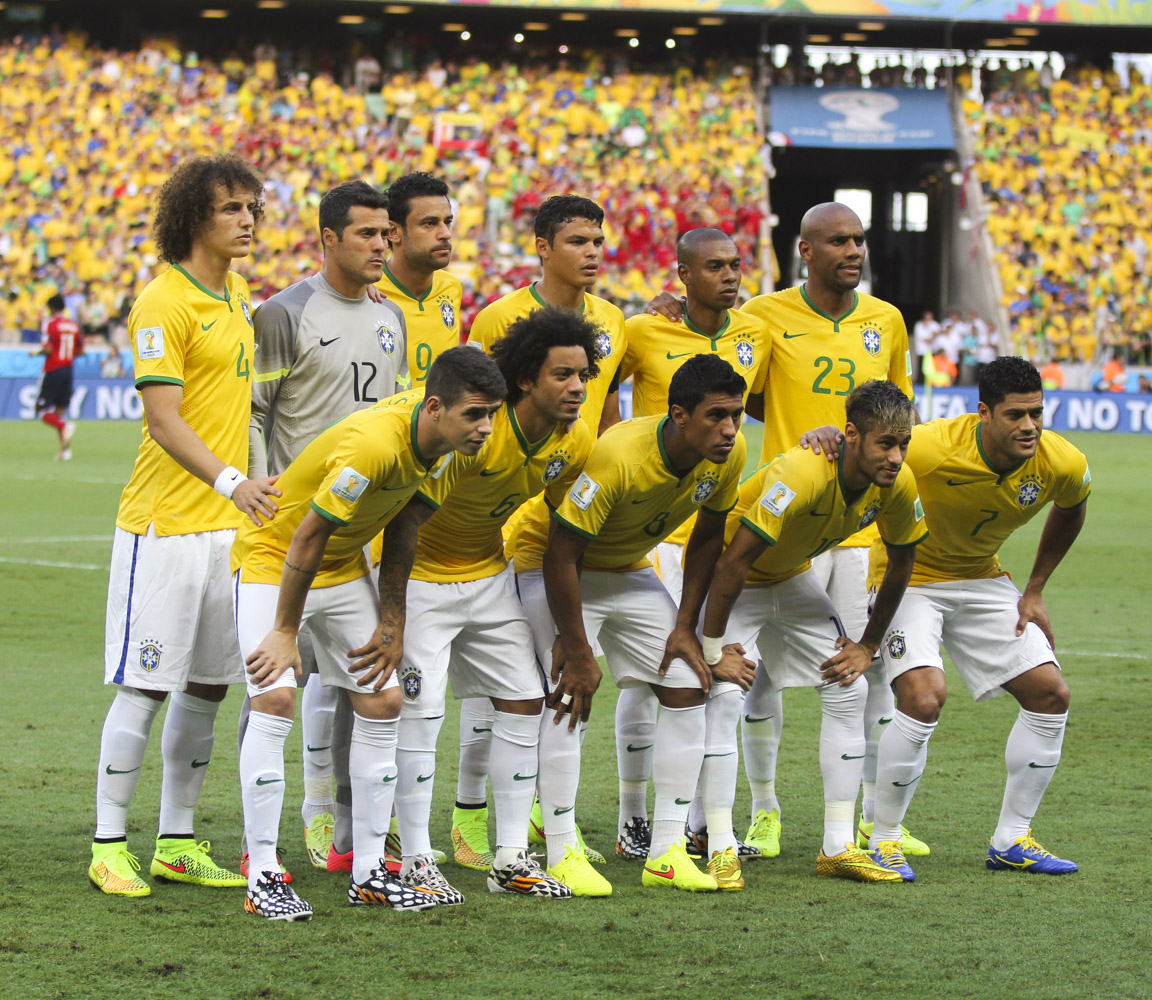
Brazil line-up against Colombia at the 2014 FIFA World Cup. Neymar (front row, second from right) would play his last game at the tournament after being stretchered off with a fractured vertebra.

The team again faced South American opposition in the quarter-final, defeating Colombia 2–1. However, late in the match, Neymar was stretchered off after a challenge by Juan Camilo Zúñiga, which led to the Brazilian suffering a fractured vertebra, ruling him out for the remainder of the tournament.

The Seleção went on to lose 7–1 to the Germans, their biggest ever defeat at the World Cup and first home loss in a competitive match since 1975. The match has been nicknamed the Mineirazo, making reference to the nation's previous World Cup defeat on home soil, the Maracanazo against Uruguay in 1950, and the Mineirão stadium where the match took place. In that match, Miroslav Klose scored, making him the top goalscorer at the FIFA World Cup with 16 goals. Curiously, Ronaldo Fenômeno was at the stadium as a commentator for Rede Globo.

Brazil subsequently lost 3–0 to the Netherlands in the third-place play-off match. Following the tournament, Scolari announced his resignation.

==== 2014–2022: After the 2014 FIFA World Cup ====
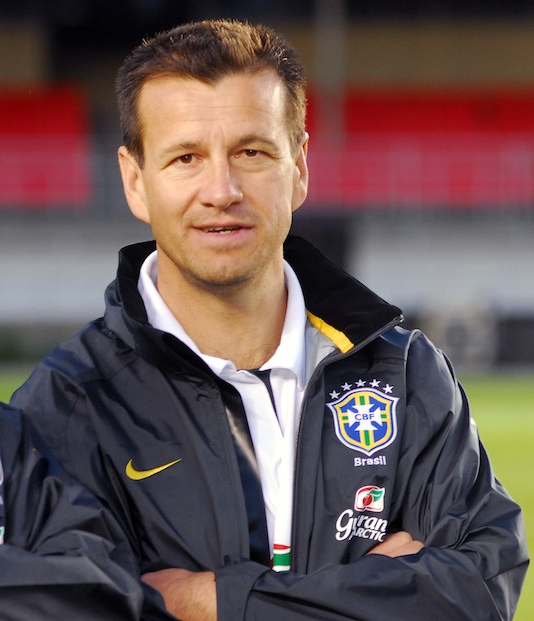
Brazil's 1994 World Cup winning captain, Dunga, was coach from 2006–2010 and 2014–2016.

On 22 July 2014, Dunga was announced as the new manager of Brazil, returning to the position for his second stint leading the national team.

At the 2015 Copa América held in Chile, Brazil finished first in Group C to advance to the knockout stages. However, they were eliminated in the next round, again losing on penalties to Paraguay.

At the 2016 Copa América Centenario held in the United States, Brazil began the tournament with a goalless draw with Ecuador before beating Haiti 7–1 in the next match. Needing only a draw to progress to the knockout stage of the tournament, Brazil suffered a controversial 1–0 loss to Peru, with Raúl Ruidíaz scoring in the 75th minute. This defeat saw Brazil eliminated from the tournament in the group stage for the first time since 1987, and also resulted in Dunga being fired from the national team.

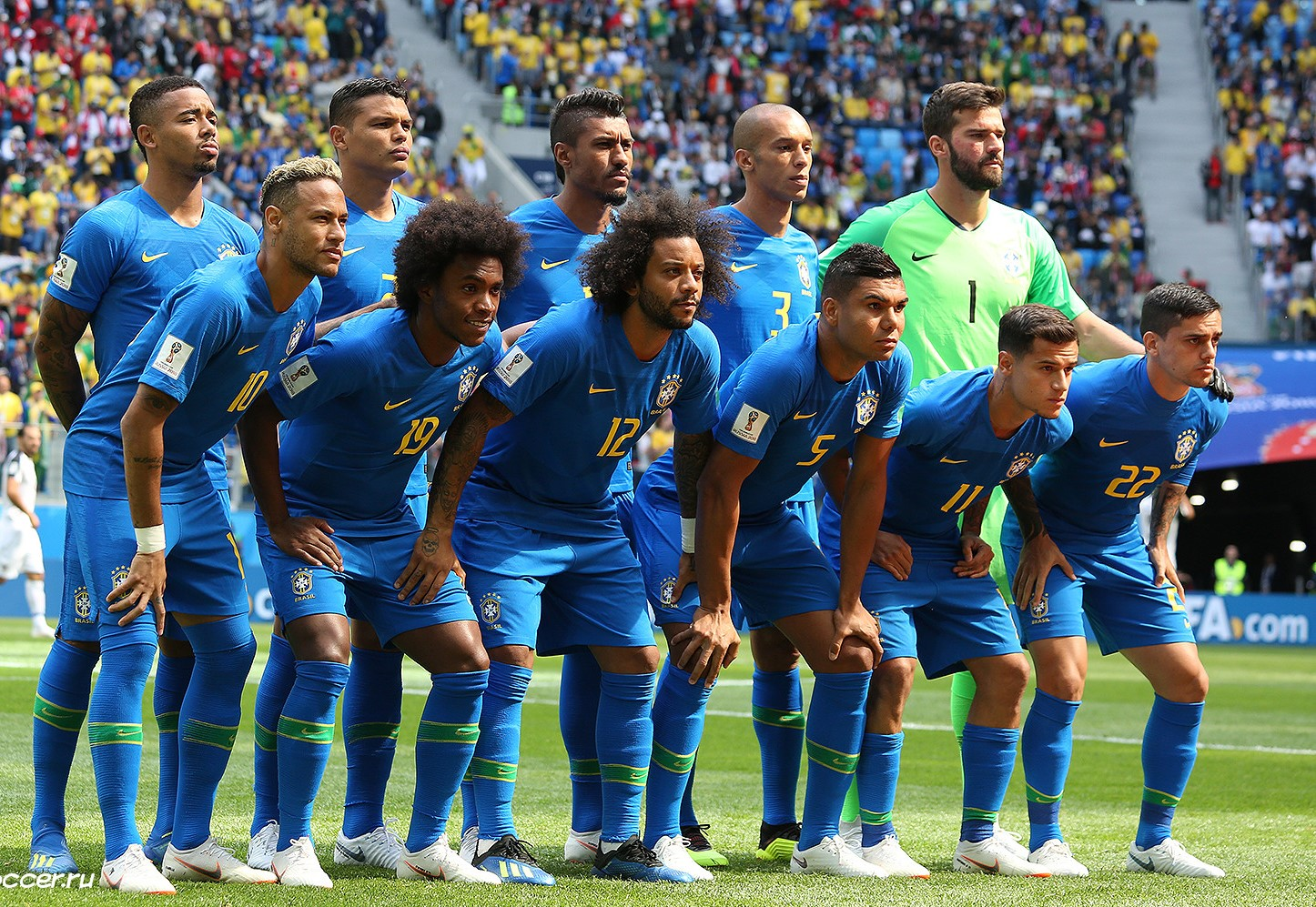
Brazil team prior to their group game against Costa Rica at the 2018 FIFA World Cup in Russia

On 14 June 2016, Tite replaced Dunga as manager of Brazil. At the 2018 FIFA World Cup, Brazil finished top of their group, tying with Switzerland 1–1, defeating Costa Rica 2-0 and Serbia 2–0. After defeating Mexico 2–0 in the round of 16, Brazil were eliminated in the quarter-finals by Belgium, losing 2–1. Despite elimination from the tournament, Tite remained as head coach.

The 2019 Copa América was held on home soil, with the team beginning the campaign with a 3–0 win against Bolivia, where the Brazilians notoriously wore a white uniform. Then Brazil had a goalless draw with Venezuela, and thumped Peru 5–0. In the quarter-finals, Brazil defeated Paraguay on penalties after another goalless draw. After beating rivals Argentina 2–0 in the semi-finals, Brazil beat Peru 3–1 in the final to win their ninth Copa América title, and their first since 2007. The team only conceded once during the tournament, during the final from a penalty kick. The next Copa América was originally scheduled to be played the following year, but due to the COVID-19 pandemic, the competition was postponed to 2021. As a result, Colombia and Argentina resigned as co-hosts, and Brazil was selected to host the tournament. The hosts reached the final once again, this time being defeated by Argentina 1–0 in the Maracanã Stadium; this was the first time Brazil failed to win the Copa América on home soil.

At the 2022 World Cup, Brazil finished first in their group, with the team defeating Serbia 2–0, Switzerland 1–0 and losing to Cameroon 1–0. The team then faced South Korea in the round of 16, winning by 4–1, and progressed to the quarter-finals where they lost on penalties to Croatia after a 1–1 draw. Following their exit from the World Cup, Tite resigned as head coach.

==== 2023–2026: Recent years and decline ====
After Tite left, Ramon Menezes served as manager from March to July 2023, before being replaced by Fernando Diniz until the end of the year. Diniz's tenure ended after Brazil lost to Argentina 1–0 at the Maracanã, with this defeat being their first home loss in FIFA World Cup qualifiers.

The CBF then appointed Dorival Júnior as manager. At the 2024 Copa América held in the United States, Brazil tied 0–0 with Costa Rica, thrashed Paraguay 4–1 and tied 1–1 with Colombia. Brazil was eliminated on penalties by Uruguay in the quarter-finals following a 0–0 draw. Dorival was fired after losing 4–1 to Argentina at the Monumental de Nuñez, and in his place the federation appointed Italian manager Carlo Ancelotti as a replacement.

Brazil qualified for the 2026 FIFA World Cup after a 1–0 victory against Paraguay on 10 June 2025. At the tournament the team suffered a 2–1 defeat to Norway in the round of 16 and failed to reach the quarter-finals for the first time in 36 years.

== Team image ==
=== Uniforms ===
Brazil's first team colors were white with blue collars, but following the defeat at Maracanã in the 1950 World Cup, the colors were criticized for lacking patriotism. With permission from the Brazilian Sports Confederation, the newspaper Correio da Manhã held a competition to design a new kit incorporating the four colors of the Brazilian flag. The winning design was a yellow jersey with green trim and blue shorts with white trim drawn by Aldyr Garcia Schlee, a nineteen-year-old from Pelotas. The new colors were first used in March 1954 in a match against Chile, and have been used ever since. Topper were the manufacturers of Brazil's kit up to and including the match against Wales on 11 September 1991; Umbro took over before the next match, versus Yugoslavia in October 1991. Nike began making the kits for Brazil in late 1996, in time for the 1997 Copa América and the 1998 FIFA World Cup.

The use of blue and white as the second kit colors owes its origins to the defunct latter-day Portuguese monarchy and dates from the 1930s, but it became the permanent second choice accidentally in the 1958 FIFA World Cup final. Brazil's opponents were Sweden, who also wore yellow, and a draw gave the home team, Sweden, the right to play in yellow. Brazil, who traveled with no second kit, hurriedly purchased a set of blue shirts and sewed the badges taken from their yellow shirts on them.

==== Kit sponsorship ====
Kit supplier	Period	Contract announcement	Contract duration	Value	Ref.
None	1908–1954				
(Japan) Athleta	1954–1977		1954–1977	None	
(Germany) Adidas	1977–1981		1977–1981		
(Argentina) Topper	1981–1991		1981–1991		
(England) Umbro	1991–1996		1991–1996		
(United States) Nike	1997–present	December 1996	1997–2007	Total: $200–250 million	
(United States) Nike	1997–present	Unknown	2008–2024	€69.5 million per year	
(United States) Nike	1997–present	December 2024	2024–2038	$100 million per year	

=== Nicknames ===
The Brazil national team is known by different names in various parts of the world. Nicknames for the squad in Brazil include:

- Canarinho, meaning 'Little Canary', a reference to a species of bird commonly found in Brazil that has a vivid yellow color, this phrase was popularized by the late cartoonist Fernando "Mangabeira" Pieruccetti during the 1950 World Cup despite the team not wearing the color yet back then
- Amarelinha (Little Yellow One)
- Seleção (The National Squad)
- Verde-amarela (The Green and Yellow)
- Pentacampeão (Five-time Champions)
- Esquadrão de Ouro (The Golden Squad)

Some Latin American commentators often refer to the Brazil team as El Scratch or Scratch du Oro (The Scratch), among others. In the 2022 World Cup, FIFA's YouTube channel referred to the team as Samba Boys.

=== Training camp ===
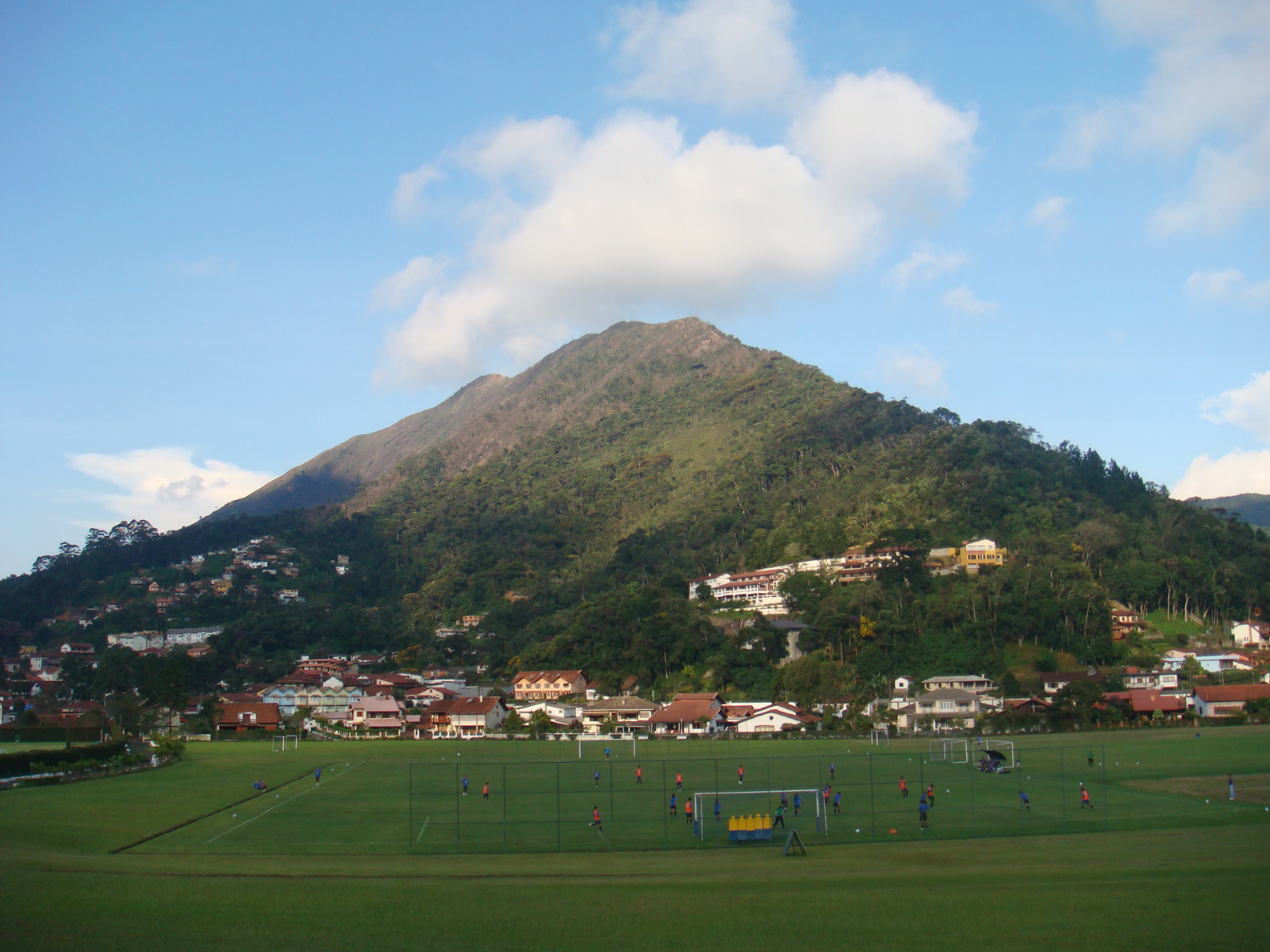
Granja Comary complex is the training camp of the national team.

Brazil's training camp is the Granja Comary in Teresópolis, located 90 km (56 mi) from Rio de Janeiro. Granja Comary was opened in 1987, and underwent significant renovations in 2013 and 2014.

== Results and fixtures ==
The following is a list of match results in the last 12 months, as well as any future matches that have been scheduled.

Win Draw Loss Fixture

=== 2025 ===
15 November 2025 Friendly	Brazil	2–0	Senegal	London, England
16:00 UTC+0	Estêvão 28'; Casemiro 35'	Report		Stadium: Emirates Stadium; Attendance: 58,657; Referee: Jarred Gillett (England)

18 November 2025 Friendly	Brazil	1–1	Tunisia	Lille, France
20:30 UTC+1	Estêvão 44' (pen.)	Report	Mastouri 23'	Stadium: Stade Pierre-Mauroy; Attendance: 40,000; Referee: Jérôme Brisard (France)

=== 2026 ===
26 March 2026 Friendly	Brazil	1–2	France	Foxborough, United States
16:00 UTC−4	Bremer 78'	Report	Mbappé 32'; Ekitike 65'	Stadium: Gillette Stadium; Attendance: 66,215; Referee: Guido Gonzales Jr. (United States)

31 March 2026 Friendly	Brazil	3–1	Croatia	Orlando, United States
20:00 UTC−4	Danilo S. 45+2'; Igor Thiago 88' (pen.); Martinelli 90+2'	Report	Majer 84'	Stadium: Camping World Stadium; Attendance: 46,398; Referee: Armando Villarreal (United States)

31 May 2026 Friendly	Brazil	6–2	Panama	Rio de Janeiro, Brazil
18:30 UTC−3	Vinícius 1'; Casemiro 38'; Rayan 52'; Paquetá 59'; Igor Thiago 62' (pen.); Danilo S. 80'	Report	Cunha 13' (o.g.); Harvey 83'	Stadium: Maracanã; Attendance: 72,140; Referee: Daniel Schlager (Germany)

6 June 2026 Friendly	Brazil	2–1	Egypt	Cleveland, United States
18:00 UTC−4	Bruno Guimarães 7'; Endrick 52'	Report	Ziko 11'	Stadium: Huntington Bank Field; Attendance: 64,311; Referee: Adonai Escobedo (Mexico)

13 June 2026 2026 FIFA World Cup GS	Brazil	1–1	Morocco	East Rutherford, United States
18:00 UTC−4	Vinícius 32'	Report	Saibari 21'	Stadium: MetLife Stadium; Attendance: 80,663; Referee: Slavko Vinčić (Slovenia)

19 June 2026 2026 FIFA World Cup GS	Brazil	3–0	Haiti	Philadelphia, United States
20:30 UTC−4	Cunha 23', 36'; Vinícius 45+3'	Report		Stadium: Lincoln Financial Field; Attendance: 68,324; Referee: Alejandro Hernández Hernández (Spain)

24 June 2026 2026 FIFA World Cup GS	Scotland	0–3	Brazil	Miami Gardens, United States
18:00 UTC−4		Report	Vinícius 7', 45+3'; Cunha 60'	Stadium: Hard Rock Stadium; Attendance: 64,478; Referee: César Arturo Ramos (Mexico)

29 June 2026 2026 FIFA World Cup R32	Brazil	2–1	Japan	Houston, United States
12:00 UTC−5	Casemiro 56'; Martinelli 90+5'	Report	Sano 29'	Stadium: NRG Stadium; Attendance: 68,777; Referee: Maurizio Mariani (Italy)

5 July 2026 2026 FIFA World Cup R16	Brazil	1–2	Norway	East Rutherford, United States
16:00 UTC−4	Neymar 90+10' (pen.)	Report	Haaland 79', 90'	Stadium: MetLife Stadium; Attendance: 80,663; Referee: Ismail Elfath (United States)

25 September 2026 Friendly	Australia	1–1	Brazil	Townsville, Australia
20:00 UTC+10	Irankunda 68'	Report	Rayan 90+5'	Stadium: North Queensland Stadium; Attendance: 25,440; Referee: Ryo Tanimoto (Japan)

29 September 2026 Friendly	Australia	2–4	Brazil	Brisbane, Australia
20:00 UTC+10	Circati 28'; Metcalfe 33'	Report	Vanderson 3'; Raphinha 45' (pen.); Bruno Guimarães 69'; Vinícius 80' (pen.)	Stadium: Lang Park; Attendance: 52,423; Referee: Yusuke Araki (Japan)

3 October 2026 Friendly	India	0–4	Brazil	Kolkata, India
19:30 UTC+5:30		Report	Estêvão 28'; Pedro 42'; Lino 58', 90+5'	Stadium: Salt Lake Stadium; Attendance: 51,402; Referee: Ilgiz Tantashev (Uzbekistan)

14 November 2026 Friendly	Japan	3–2	Brazil	Kallang, Singapore
18:15 UTC+8	Kubo 15'; Nakamura 19'; Sakamoto 90+1'	Report	Vinícius 33', 75'	Stadium: National Stadium; Attendance: 38,688; Referee: Jansen Foo (Singapore)

17 November 2026 Friendly	Singapore	0–7	Brazil	Kallang, Singapore
18:00 UTC+8		Report	Vinícius 9', 15', 21'; Endrick 31'; Estêvão 51'; Rayan 65'; Suhaimi 74' (o.g.)	Stadium: National Stadium; Referee: Mongkolchai Pechsri (Thailand)

== Coaching staff ==
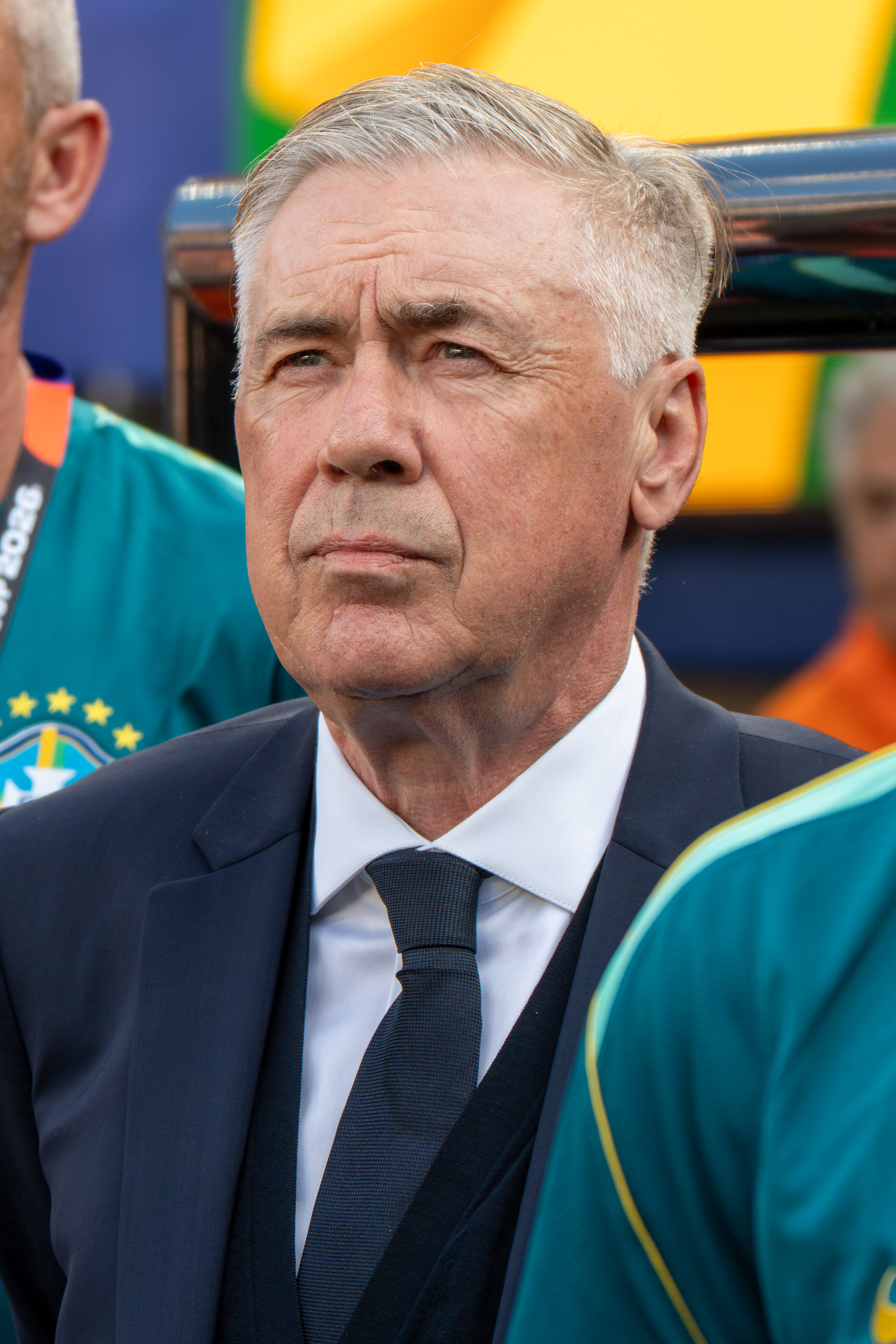
Carlo Ancelotti, the head coach of the Brazil national football team since 26 May 2025, after leaving his former club Real Madrid.

Position	Name	Ref
Head coach	(Italy) Carlo Ancelotti	
Assistant coaches	(England) Paul Clement	
Assistant coaches	(Italy) Francesco Mauri	
Goalkeeping coaches	(Brazil) Claudio Taffarel	
Goalkeeping coaches	(Brazil) Marco Antônio Trocourt	
Physical coach	(Italy) Francesco Mauri	
Match analysts	(Italy) Simone Montanaro	
Match analysts	(Brazil) Thomaz Koerich	
Performance analyst	(Italy) Mino Fulco	
Physiologist	(Brazil) Guilherme Passos	
Doctors	(Brazil) Rodrigo Lasmar	
Doctors	(Brazil) Andréia Picanço	
Scout	(Italy) Luigi Vito Lasala	
Team coordinator	(Brazil) Juan	
Sporting director	(Brazil) Rodrigo Caetano	

== Players ==
=== Current squad ===
The following 26 players were named in the squad for the friendly matches against Japan and Singapore on 14 and 17 November 2026, respectively.
Caps and goals are correct as of 17 November 2026, after the match against Singapore.

No.	Pos.	Player	Date of birth (age)	Caps	Goals	Club
1	GK	Bento	10 June 1999 (age 27)	7	0	(Saudi Arabian Football Federation) Al-Nassr
12	GK	Lucas Perri	10 December 1997 (age 28)	1	0	(Italian Football Federation) Torino
23	GK	Pedro Morisco	10 January 2004 (age 22)	2	0	(Brazilian Football Confederation) Coritiba
2	DF	Wesley	6 September 2003 (age 23)	9	0	(Italian Football Federation) Roma
3	DF	Gabriel Magalhães	19 December 1997 (age 28)	26	1	(The Football Association) Arsenal
4	DF	Jair Cunha	7 March 2005 (age 21)	4	0	(The Football Association) Nottingham Forest
6	DF	Douglas Santos	22 March 1994 (age 32)	15	0	(Russian Football Union) Zenit Saint Petersburg
13	DF	Vanderson	21 June 2001 (age 25)	11	1	(French Football Federation) Monaco (Note: Monaco is a Monégasque club playing in the French football league system.)
14	DF	Vitor Reis	12 January 2006 (age 20)	3	0	(The Football Association) Manchester City
15	DF	Arthur Dias	10 April 2007 (age 19)	3	0	(Brazilian Football Confederation) Athletico Paranaense
16	DF	Carlos Augusto	7 January 1999 (age 27)	5	0	(Italian Football Federation) Inter Milan
24	DF	Jonathan Jesus	27 May 2004 (age 22)	2	0	(Brazilian Football Confederation) Cruzeiro
8	MF	Bruno Guimarães	16 November 1997 (age 29)	53	4	(The Football Association) Arsenal
17	MF	André	20 June 2006 (age 20)	2	0	(Brazilian Football Confederation) Corinthians
18	MF	João Gomes	12 February 2001 (age 25)	12	0	(The Football Association) Aston Villa
21	MF	Andrey Santos	3 May 2004 (age 22)	9	0	(The Football Association) Manchester United
20	MF	Marlon Gomes	14 December 2003 (age 22)	2	0	(Ukrainian Association of Football) Shakhtar Donetsk
25	MF	Gabriel Bontempo	16 January 2005 (age 21)	3	0	(Brazilian Football Confederation) Santos
7	FW	Vinícius Júnior	12 July 2000 (age 26)	59	19	(Royal Spanish Football Federation) Real Madrid
9	FW	Endrick	21 July 2006 (age 20)	26	5	(Royal Spanish Football Federation) Real Madrid
10	FW	Raphinha	14 December 1996 (age 29)	44	12	(Royal Spanish Football Federation) Barcelona
11	FW	Estêvão	24 April 2007 (age 19)	16	7	(The Football Association) Chelsea
19	FW	Alisson Santana	21 September 2005 (age 21)	2	0	(Ukrainian Association of Football) Shakhtar Donetsk
22	FW	Allan	19 April 2004 (age 22)	1	0	(The Football Association) Manchester City
26	FW	Rayan	3 August 2006 (age 20)	9	3	(The Football Association) Bournemouth

=== Recent call-ups ===
The following players have also been called up to the Brazil squad in the last twelve months.

Pos.	Player	Date of birth (age)	Caps	Goals	Club	Latest call-up
GK	Hugo Souza	31 January 1999 (age 27)	2	0	(Brazil) Corinthians	v. India, 3 October 2026
GK	Otávio	27 December 2005 (age 20)	1	0	(Brazil) Cruzeiro	v. India, 3 October 2026
GK	Alisson	2 October 1992 (age 34)	83	0	(England) Liverpool	2026 FIFA World Cup
GK	Ederson	17 August 1993 (age 33)	32	0	(Turkey) Fenerbahçe	2026 FIFA World Cup
GK	Weverton	13 December 1987 (age 38)	11	0	(Brazil) Grêmio	2026 FIFA World Cup
GK	John Victor	13 February 1996 (age 30)	0	0	(England) Nottingham Forest	2026 FIFA World Cup ^{PRE}
DF	Marquinhos (Captain)	14 May 1994 (age 32)	112	7	(France) Paris Saint-Germain	v. India, 3 October 2026
DF	Matheuzinho	8 September 2000 (age 26)	3	0	(Brazil) Corinthians	v. India, 3 October 2026
DF	Mauro Júnior	6 May 1999 (age 27)	3	0	(Netherlands) PSV	v. India, 3 October 2026
DF	Danilo	15 July 1991 (age 35)	75	1	(Brazil) Flamengo	2026 FIFA World Cup
DF	Alex Sandro	26 January 1991 (age 35)	46	2	(Brazil) Flamengo	2026 FIFA World Cup
DF	Bremer	18 March 1997 (age 29)	8	1	(Italy) Juventus	2026 FIFA World Cup
DF	Roger Ibañez	23 November 1998 (age 27)	8	0	(Saudi Arabia) Al-Ahli	2026 FIFA World Cup
DF	Léo Pereira	31 January 1996 (age 30)	4	0	(Brazil) Flamengo	2026 FIFA World Cup
DF	Thiago Silva	22 September 1984 (age 42)	113	7	(Brazil) Fluminense	2026 FIFA World Cup ^{PRE}
DF	Fabrício Bruno	12 February 1996 (age 30)	6	0	(Brazil) Cruzeiro	2026 FIFA World Cup ^{PRE}
DF	Alexsandro	9 August 1999 (age 27)	3	0	(France) Lille	2026 FIFA World Cup ^{PRE}
DF	Paulo Henrique	25 July 1996 (age 30)	2	1	(Brazil) Vasco da Gama	2026 FIFA World Cup ^{PRE}
DF	Léo Ortiz	3 January 1996 (age 30)	2	0	(Brazil) Flamengo	2026 FIFA World Cup ^{PRE}
DF	Vitinho	23 July 1999 (age 27)	2	0	(Brazil) Botafogo	2026 FIFA World Cup ^{PRE}
DF	Kaiki	8 March 2003 (age 23)	1	0	(Italy) Como	2026 FIFA World Cup ^{PRE}
DF	Luciano Juba	29 August 1999 (age 27)	0	0	(Brazil) Bahia	2026 FIFA World Cup ^{PRE}
MF	Danilo	29 April 2001 (age 25)	11	2	(Brazil) Botafogo	v. Japan, 14 November 2026 ^{INJ}
MF	Douglas Luiz	9 May 1998 (age 28)	20	0	(Italy) Juventus	v. India, 3 October 2026
MF	Breno Bidon	20 February 2005 (age 21)	2	0	(Brazil) Corinthians	v. India, 3 October 2026
MF	Matheus Martinelli	5 October 2001 (age 25)	2	0	(Brazil) Fluminense	v. India, 3 October 2026
MF	Casemiro (Vice-Captain)	23 February 1992 (age 34)	91	10	(United States) Inter Miami	2026 FIFA World Cup
MF	Lucas Paquetá	27 August 1997 (age 29)	67	13	(Brazil) Flamengo	2026 FIFA World Cup
MF	Fabinho	23 October 1993 (age 33)	36	0	(Turkey) Trabzonspor	2026 FIFA World Cup
MF	Éderson	6 July 1999 (age 27)	5	0	(Italy) Atalanta	2026 FIFA World Cup
MF	Gerson	20 May 1997 (age 29)	14	1	(Brazil) Cruzeiro	2026 FIFA World Cup ^{PRE}
MF	Andreas Pereira	1 January 1996 (age 30)	10	2	(Brazil) Palmeiras	2026 FIFA World Cup ^{PRE}
MF	Matheus Pereira	5 May 1996 (age 30)	1	0	(Brazil) Cruzeiro	2026 FIFA World Cup ^{PRE}
MF	Gabriel Sara	26 June 1999 (age 27)	1	0	(Turkey) Galatasaray	2026 FIFA World Cup ^{PRE}
FW	Pedro	20 June 1997 (age 29)	8	2	(Brazil) Flamengo	v. India, 3 October 2026
FW	Samuel Lino	23 December 1999 (age 26)	4	2	(Brazil) Flamengo	v. India, 3 October 2026
FW	João Pedro	26 September 2001 (age 25)	8	0	(England) Chelsea	v. Australia, 25 September 2026 ^{INJ}
FW	Neymar ^{RET}	5 February 1992 (age 34)	130	80	(Brazil) Santos	2026 FIFA World Cup
FW	Matheus Cunha	27 May 1999 (age 27)	28	4	(England) Manchester United	2026 FIFA World Cup
FW	Gabriel Martinelli	18 June 2001 (age 25)	27	5	(Saudi Arabia) Al-Hilal	2026 FIFA World Cup
FW	Luiz Henrique	2 January 2001 (age 25)	16	2	(Russia) Zenit Saint Petersburg	2026 FIFA World Cup
FW	Igor Thiago	26 June 2001 (age 25)	5	2	(England) Brentford	2026 FIFA World Cup
FW	Gabriel Jesus	3 April 1997 (age 29)	64	19	(Spain) Barcelona	2026 FIFA World Cup ^{PRE}
FW	Richarlison	10 May 1997 (age 29)	54	20	(England) Tottenham Hotspur	2026 FIFA World Cup ^{PRE}
FW	Antony	24 February 2000 (age 26)	16	2	(Spain) Betis	2026 FIFA World Cup ^{PRE}
FW	Sávio	10 April 2004 (age 22)	13	1	(England) Tottenham Hotspur	2026 FIFA World Cup ^{PRE}
FW	Igor Jesus	25 February 2001 (age 25)	5	1	(England) Nottingham Forest	2026 FIFA World Cup^{PRE}
FW	Kaio Jorge	24 January 2002 (age 24)	1	0	(Brazil) Cruzeiro	2026 FIFA World Cup ^{PRE}
^{INJ} Player withdrew from the squad due to injury; ^{RET} Player retired from the national team; ^{SUS} Player served suspension; ^{WIT} Player withdrew from the squad due to non-injury issue; ^{EXP} Player expelled from squad

== Individual records ==
As of 25 September 2026.
Players in bold are still active with Brazil.

=== Most appearances ===
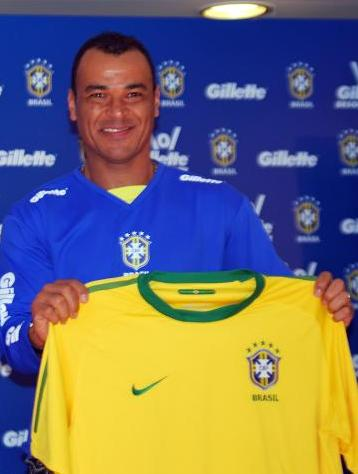
Cafu is the all-time most capped player for Brazil with 142 appearances.

Rank	Player	Caps	Goals	Career
1	Cafu	142	5	1990–2006
2	Neymar	130	80	2010–2026
3	Dani Alves	126	8	2006–2022
4	Roberto Carlos	125	10	1992–2006
5	Thiago Silva	113	7	2008–2022
6	**Marquinhos**	111	7	2013–present
7	Lúcio	105	4	2000–2011
8	Cláudio Taffarel	101	0	1988–1998
9	Robinho	100	28	2003–2017
10	Ronaldo	98	62	1994–2011
10	Djalma Santos	98	3	1952–1968

=== Top goalscorers ===
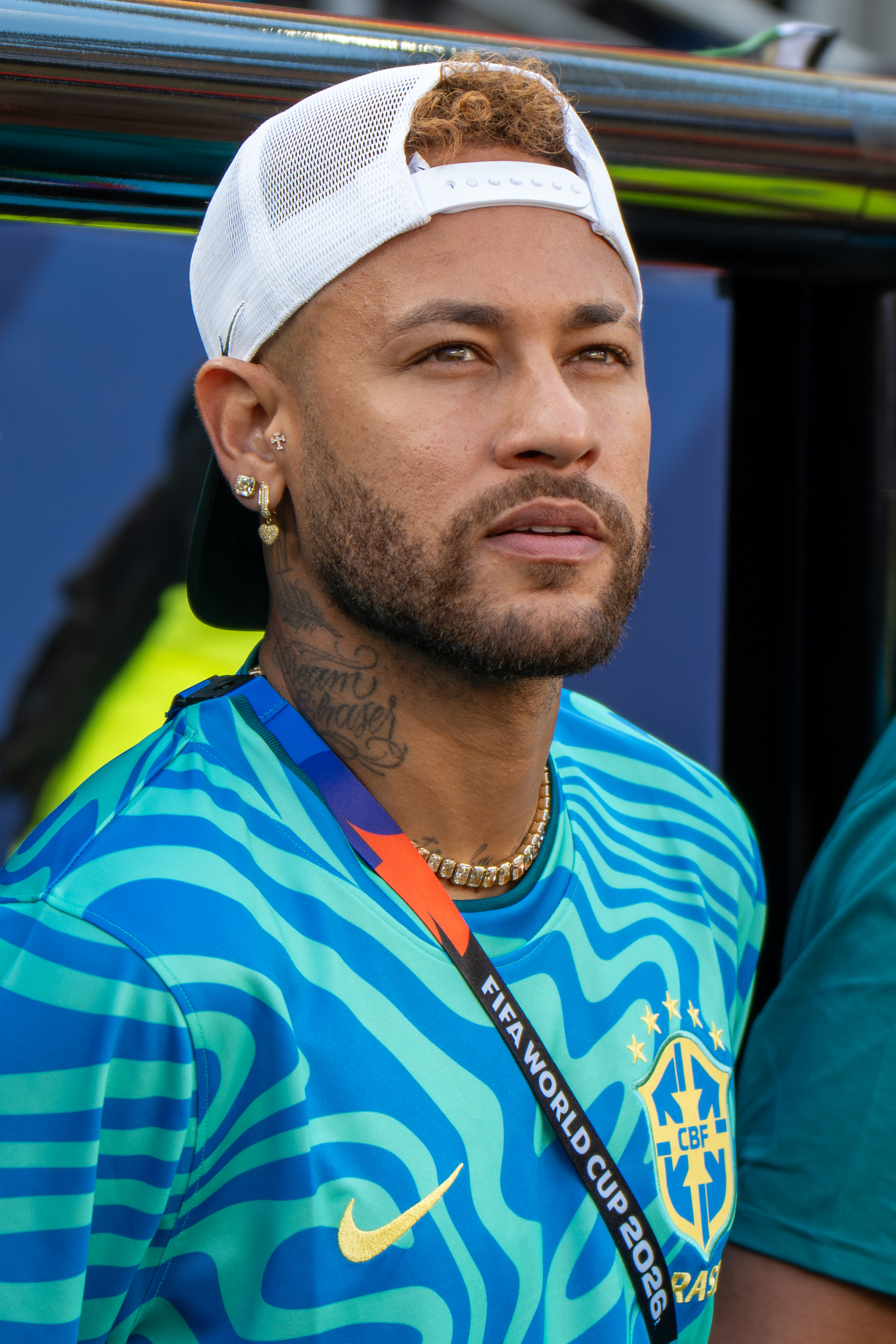
Neymar is Brazil's all-time top scorer with 80 goals.

Rank	Player	Goals	Caps	Average	Career
1	Neymar	80	130	0.62	2010–2026
2	Pelé (Note: This includes a match for Brazil against the rest of the world, which FIFA does not recognise, played for the 10th anniversary of their first World Cup title)	77	92	0.84	1957–1971
3	Ronaldo	62	98	0.63	1994–2011
4	Romário (Note: Some sources, including FIFA, credit Romário with an extra goal in a 3–2 win against Mexico in the 1997 Copa América while other sources give it as an own goal to Camilo Romero. It is not counted here.)	55	70	0.79	1987–2005
5	Zico	48	71	0.68	1976–1986
6	Bebeto	38	75	0.51	1985–1998
7	Rivaldo	35	74	0.47	1993–2003
8	Jairzinho	33	81	0.41	1964–1982
8	Ronaldinho	33	97	0.34	1999–2013
10	Ademir	32	39	0.82	1945–1953
10	Tostão	32	54	0.59	1966–1972

=== Other records ===
Youngest goalscorer

- Pelé (16 years and nine months) vs. Argentina, 7 July 1957

Oldest goalscorer

- Romário (39 years and two months) vs. Guatemala, 27 April 2005

Most goals scored in a single match

- Evaristo (5 goals) vs. Colombia, 24 March 1957

First goal scored

- Oswaldo Gomes vs. (England) Exeter City FC, 21 July 1914 (unofficial game)
- Rubens Salles vs. Argentina, 27 September 1914 (official game)

Most clean sheets

- Cláudio Taffarel (52 matches)

Most matches as a captain

- Cafu (66 matches)

Most yellow cards received

- Neymar (33 yellow cards)

Most red cards received

- Dunga and Éder Aleixo (3 red cards each)

=== Manager records ===
Mário Zagallo became the first person to win the FIFA World Cup both as a player (1958 and 1962) and as a manager (1970). In 1970, at the age of 38, he became the second-youngest coach to win the tournament. While still in Brazil as an assistant coach, the team won the 1994 FIFA World Cup.

== Competitive record ==
Champions Runners-up Third place Fourth place Tournament played fully or partially on home soil

*Draws include knockout matches decided via penalty shoot-out.

=== FIFA World Cup ===
Brazil has qualified for every FIFA World Cup they entered, never requiring a qualifying play-off. With five titles, they have won the tournament on more occasions than any other national team.

FIFA World Cup record										Qualification record						
Year	Round	Position	Pld	W	D	L	GF	GA	Squad	Pld	W	D	L	GF	GA	—
(Uruguay) 1930	Group stage	6th	2	1	0	1	5	2	Squad	Qualified as invitees						
(Italy) 1934	Round of 16	14th	1	0	0	1	1	3	Squad	Qualified automatically						
(France) 1938	Third place	3rd	5	3	1	1	14	11	Squad	Qualified automatically						
(Brazil) 1950	Runners-up	2nd	6	4	1	1	22	6	Squad	Qualified as hosts						
(Switzerland) 1954	Quarter-finals	5th	3	1	1	1	8	5	Squad	4	4	0	0	8	1	1954
(Sweden) 1958	Champions	1st	6	5	1	0	16	4	Squad	2	1	1	0	2	1	1958
(Chile) 1962	Champions	1st	6	5	1	0	14	5	Squad	Qualified as defending champions						
(England) 1966	Group stage	11th	3	1	0	2	4	6	Squad	Qualified as defending champions						
(Mexico) 1970	Champions	1st	6	6	0	0	19	7	Squad	6	6	0	0	23	2	1970
(West Germany) 1974	Fourth place	4th	7	3	2	2	6	4	Squad	Qualified as defending champions						
(Argentina) 1978	Third place	3rd	7	4	3	0	10	3	Squad	6	4	2	0	17	1	1978
(Spain) 1982	Second group stage	5th	5	4	0	1	15	6	Squad	4	4	0	0	11	2	1982
(Mexico) 1986	Quarter-finals	5th	5	4	1	0	10	1	Squad	4	2	2	0	6	2	1986
(Italy) 1990	Round of 16	9th	4	3	0	1	4	2	Squad	4	3	1	0	13	1	1990
(United States) 1994	Champions	1st	7	5	2	0	11	3	Squad	8	5	2	1	20	4	1994
(France) 1998	Runners-up	2nd	7	4	1	2	14	10	Squad	Qualified as defending champions						
(South Korea) (Japan) 2002	Champions	1st	7	7	0	0	18	4	Squad	18	9	3	6	31	17	2002
(Germany) 2006	Quarter-finals	5th	5	4	0	1	10	2	Squad	18	9	7	2	35	17	2006
(South Africa) 2010	Quarter-finals	6th	5	3	1	1	9	4	Squad	18	9	7	2	33	11	2010
(Brazil) 2014	Fourth place	4th	7	3	2	2	11	14	Squad	Qualified as hosts						
(Russia) 2018	Quarter-finals	6th	5	3	1	1	8	3	Squad	18	12	5	1	41	11	2018
(Qatar) 2022	Quarter-finals	7th	5	3	1	1	8	3	Squad	17	14	3	0	40	5	2022
(Canada) (Mexico) (United States) 2026	Round of 16	11th	5	3	1	1	10	4	Squad	18	8	4	6	24	17	2026
(Morocco) (Portugal) (Spain) 2030	To be determined									To be determined						2030
(Saudi Arabia) 2034	To be determined									To be determined						2034
Total	5 Titles	23/23	119	79	20	20	247	112	—	145	90	37	18	304	92	—

=== Copa América ===
South American Championship / Copa América record
Year	Round	Position	Pld	W	D	L	GF	GA	Squad
(Argentina) 1916	Third place	3rd	3	0	2	1	3	4	Squad
(Uruguay) 1917	Third place	3rd	3	1	0	2	7	8	Squad
(Brazil) 1919	Champions	1st	4	3	1	0	12	3	Squad
(Chile) 1920	Third place	3rd	3	1	0	2	1	8	Squad
(Argentina) 1921	Runners-up	2nd	3	1	0	2	4	3	Squad
(Brazil) 1922	Champions	1st	5	2	3	0	7	2	Squad
(Uruguay) 1923	Fourth place	4th	3	0	0	3	2	5	Squad
(Uruguay) 1924	Withdrew								
(Argentina) 1925	Runners-up	2nd	4	2	1	1	11	9	Squad
(Chile) 1926	Withdrew								
(Peru) 1927	Withdrew								
(Argentina) 1929	Withdrew								
(Peru) 1935	Withdrew								
(Argentina) 1937	Runners-up	2nd	6	4	0	2	17	11	Squad
(Peru) 1939	Withdrew								
(Chile) 1941	Withdrew								
(Uruguay) 1942	Third place	3rd	6	3	1	2	15	7	Squad
(Chile) 1945	Runners-up	2nd	6	5	0	1	19	5	Squad
(Argentina) 1946	Runners-up	2nd	5	3	1	1	13	7	Squad
(Ecuador) 1947	Withdrew								
(Brazil) 1949	Champions	1st	8	7	0	1	46	7	Squad
(Peru) 1953	Runners-up	2nd	7	4	0	3	17	9	Squad
(Chile) 1955	Withdrew								
(Uruguay) 1956	Fourth place	4th	5	2	2	1	4	5	Squad
(Peru) 1957	Runners-up	2nd	6	4	0	2	23	9	Squad
(Argentina) 1959	Runners-up	2nd	6	4	2	0	17	7	Squad
(Ecuador) 1959	Third place	3rd	4	2	0	2	7	10	Squad
(Bolivia) 1963	Fourth place	4th	6	2	1	3	12	13	Squad
(Uruguay) 1967	Withdrew								
(Union of South American Nations) 1975	Third place	3rd	6	5	0	1	16	4	Squad
(Union of South American Nations) 1979	Third place	3rd	6	2	2	2	10	9	Squad
(Union of South American Nations) 1983	Runners-up	2nd	8	2	4	2	8	5	Squad
(Argentina) 1987	Group stage	5th	2	1	0	1	5	4	Squad
(Brazil) 1989	Champions	1st	7	5	2	0	11	1	Squad
(Chile) 1991	Runners-up	2nd	7	4	1	2	12	8	Squad
(Ecuador) 1993	Quarter-finals	5th	4	1	2	1	6	4	Squad
(Uruguay) 1995	Runners-up	2nd	6	4	2	0	10	3	Squad
(Bolivia) 1997	Champions	1st	6	6	0	0	22	3	Squad
(Paraguay) 1999	Champions	1st	6	6	0	0	17	2	Squad
(Colombia) 2001	Quarter-finals	6th	4	2	0	2	5	4	Squad
(Peru) 2004	Champions	1st	6	3	2	1	13	6	Squad
(Venezuela) 2007	Champions	1st	6	4	1	1	15	5	Squad
(Argentina) 2011	Quarter-finals	8th	4	1	3	0	6	4	Squad
(Chile) 2015	Quarter-finals	5th	4	2	1	1	5	4	Squad
(United States) 2016	Group stage	9th	3	1	1	1	7	2	Squad
(Brazil) 2019	Champions	1st	6	4	2	0	13	1	Squad
(Brazil) 2021	Runners-up	2nd	7	5	1	1	12	3	Squad
(United States) 2024	Quarter-finals	6th	4	1	3	0	5	2	Squad
Total	9 Titles	38/48	195	109	41	45	435	206	—

=== FIFA Confederations Cup ===
FIFA Confederations Cup record
Year	Round	Position	Pld	W	D	L	GF	GA	Squad
(Saudi Arabia) 1992	Did not qualify								
(Saudi Arabia) 1995	Did not qualify								
(Saudi Arabia) 1997	Champions	1st	5	4	1	0	14	2	Squad
(Mexico) 1999	Runners-up	2nd	5	4	0	1	18	6	Squad
(South Korea) (Japan) 2001	Fourth place	4th	5	1	2	2	3	3	Squad
(France) 2003	Group stage	5th	3	1	1	1	3	3	Squad
(Germany) 2005	Champions	1st	5	3	1	1	12	6	Squad
(South Africa) 2009	Champions	1st	5	5	0	0	14	5	Squad
(Brazil) 2013	Champions	1st	5	5	0	0	14	3	Squad
(Russia) 2017	Did not qualify								
Total	4 Titles	7/10	33	23	5	5	78	28	—

=== Olympic Games ===
Olympic Games record
Year	Round	Position	Pld	W	D	L	GF	GA	Squad
(France) 1900	Only club teams participated								
(United States) 1904	Only club teams participated								
(United Kingdom) 1908	No national representative								
(Sweden) 1912	No national representative								
(Belgium) 1920	Did not participate								
(France) 1924	Did not participate								
(Netherlands) 1928	Did not participate								
(Germany) 1936	Did not participate								
(United Kingdom) 1948	Did not participate								
(Finland) 1952	Quarter-finals	6th	3	2	0	1	9	6	Squad
(Australia) 1956	Did not participate								
(Italy) 1960	Group stage	6th	3	2	0	1	10	6	Squad
(Japan) 1964	Group stage	9th	3	1	1	1	5	2	Squad
(Mexico) 1968	Group stage	11th	3	0	2	1	4	5	Squad
(West Germany) 1972	Group stage	12th	3	0	1	2	4	6	Squad
(Canada) 1976	Fourth place	4th	5	2	1	2	6	6	Squad
(Soviet Union) 1980	Did not qualify								
(United States) 1984	Silver medal	2nd	6	4	1	1	9	5	Squad
(South Korea) 1988	Silver medal	2nd	6	4	1	1	12	4	Squad
Since 1992	See Brazil national under-23 football team								
Total	2 Silver medals	8/19	32	15	7	10	59	40	—

== Head-to-head record ==
Below is a result summary of all matches Brazil have played against FIFA recognized teams.

Updated on 17 November 2026, after the match against Singapore.

Positive Record Neutral Record Negative Record

Opponent	Pld	W	D	L	GF	GA	GD	Win %
Algeria	4	4	0	0	8	0	+8	100.00%
Andorra	1	1	0	0	3	0	+3	100.00%
Argentina (Note: AFA and CBF differ from the total match count. Here, it shows only the numbers according to CBF. For more information, visit the article Argentina–Brazil football rivalry)	111	43	26	42	167	167	0	38.94%
Australia	11	8	2	1	30	6	+24	72.73%
Austria	10	7	3	0	17	5	+12	70.00%
Belgium	5	3	0	2	11	8	+3	60.00%
Bolivia	34	24	4	6	113	27	+86	70.59%
Bosnia and Herzegovina	2	2	0	0	3	1	+2	100.00%
Bulgaria	9	8	1	0	19	2	+17	88.89%
Cameroon	7	5	0	2	12	3	+9	71.43%
Canada	4	2	2	0	8	4	+4	50.00%
Chile	77	55	14	8	175	62	+113	71.42%
China	3	2	1	0	12	0	+12	66.67%
Colombia	38	22	12	4	71	22	+49	57.89%
Costa Rica	12	10	1	1	34	9	+25	86.11%
Croatia	6	4	2	0	11	4	+7	66.67%
Czech Republic (Note: Includes matches against Czechoslovakia)	19	11	6	2	32	15	+17	57.89%
Denmark	3	2	0	1	6	7	−1	66.67%
DR Congo (Note: Includes matches against Zaire)	1	1	0	0	3	0	+3	100.00%
East Germany	4	3	1	0	10	4	+6	75.00%
Ecuador	37	28	7	2	99	24	+75	75.68%
Egypt (Note: Includes matches against the United Arab Republic)	7	7	0	0	20	5	+15	100.00%
El Salvador	3	3	0	0	13	0	+13	100.00%
England	27	12	11	4	35	23	+12	44.44%
Estonia	1	1	0	0	1	0	+1	100.00%
Finland	3	3	0	0	9	3	+6	100.00%
France	17	7	4	6	28	22	+6	41.18%
Gabon	1	1	0	0	2	0	+2	100.00%
Germany (Note: Includes matches against West Germany)	23	13	5	5	41	31	+10	56.52%
Ghana	5	5	0	0	16	2	+14	100.00%
Greece	2	1	1	0	3	0	+3	50.00%
Guatemala	2	1	1	0	4	1	+3	50.00%
Guinea	1	1	0	0	4	1	+3	100.00%
Haiti	4	4	0	0	20	1	+19	100.00%
Honduras	8	6	1	1	29	6	+23	75.00%
Hong Kong	1	1	0	0	7	1	+6	100.00%
Hungary	6	2	1	3	12	14	−2	33.33%
Iceland	2	2	0	0	9	1	+8	100.00%
India	1	1	0	0	4	0	+4	100.00%
Iran	1	1	0	0	3	0	+3	100.00%
Iraq	1	1	0	0	6	0	+6	100.00%
Israel	3	3	0	0	11	1	+10	100.00%
Italy	16	8	3	5	30	23	+7	50.00%
Ivory Coast	1	1	0	0	3	1	+2	100.00%
Jamaica	3	2	1	0	2	0	+2	66.67%
Japan	16	12	2	2	41	12	+29	75.00%
Latvia	1	1	0	0	3	0	+3	100.00%
Lithuania	1	1	0	0	3	1	+2	100.00%
Malaysia	1	1	0	0	4	0	+4	100.00%
Mexico	42	25	7	10	78	38	+40	59.53%
Morocco	4	2	1	1	7	3	+4	50.00%
Netherlands	12	3	5	4	15	18	−3	25.00%
New Zealand	3	3	0	0	10	0	+10	100.00%
Nigeria	2	1	1	0	4	1	+3	50.00%
Northern Ireland	1	1	0	0	3	0	+3	100.00%
North Korea	1	1	0	0	2	1	+1	100.00%
Norway	5	0	2	3	6	10	−4	0.00%
Oman	1	1	0	0	2	0	+2	100.00%
Panama	6	5	1	0	23	3	+20	83.33%
Paraguay	85	51	22	12	184	68	+116	60.00%
Peru	52	38	9	5	114	33	+81	73.07%
Poland	13	10	2	1	40	20	+20	76.92%
Portugal	20	13	3	4	39	16	+23	65.00%
Qatar	1	1	0	0	2	0	+2	100.00%
Republic of Ireland	7	4	1	1	12	2	+10	66.67%
Romania	5	4	1	0	9	4	+5	80.00%
Russia (Note: Includes matches against the Soviet Union)	15	9	3	3	28	13	+15	60%
Saudi Arabia	5	5	0	0	18	3	+15	100.00%
Scotland	11	9	2	0	19	3	+16	81.81%
Senegal	3	1	1	1	5	5	0	33.33%
Serbia (Note: Includes matches against Yugoslavia/Serbia and Montenegro)	21	12	7	2	41	23	+18	57.14%
Singapore	1	1	0	0	7	0	+7	100.00%
Slovakia	1	1	0	0	5	0	+5	100.00%
South Africa	5	5	0	0	12	3	+9	100.00%
South Korea	9	8	0	1	25	6	+19	88.89%
Spain	10	5	3	2	17	11	+6	50.00%
Sweden	16	10	4	2	36	18	+18	62.50%
Switzerland	10	4	4	2	12	9	+3	40.00%
Tanzania	1	1	0	0	5	1	+4	100.00%
Thailand	1	1	0	0	7	0	+7	100.00%
Tunisia	3	2	1	0	10	3	+7	66.67%
Turkey	6	4	2	0	10	3	+7	66.67%
Ukraine	1	1	0	0	2	0	+2	100.00%
United Arab Emirates	1	1	0	0	8	0	+8	100.00%
United States	20	18	1	1	42	13	+29	91.68%
Uruguay	81	38	22	21	142	100	+42	47.60%
Venezuela	30	24	5	1	98	11	+87	80.00%
Wales	10	8	1	1	20	5	+15	80.00%
Zambia	1	1	0	0	2	0	+2	100.00%
Zimbabwe	1	1	0	0	3	0	+3	100.00%
Total (90)	1,079	680	223	175	2,331	966	+1,375	63.16%

== Honours ==
=== Global ===
- FIFA World Cup
  - (gold) Champions (5): 1958, 1962, 1970, 1994, 2002
  - (silver) Runners-up (2): 1950, 1998
  - (bronze) Third place (2): 1938, 1978
- FIFA Confederations Cup
  - (gold) Champions (4): 1997, 2005, 2009, 2013
  - (silver) Runners-up (1): 1999
- Olympic Games
  - (silver) Silver medal (2): 1984,^{1} 1988^{1}

=== Continental ===
- South American Championship / Copa América
  - (gold) Champions (9): 1919, 1922, 1949, 1989, 1997, 1999, 2004, 2007, 2019
  - (silver) Runners-up (12): 1921, 1925, 1937, 1945, 1946, 1953, 1957, 1959-I, 1983, 1991, 1995, 2021
  - (bronze) Third place (7): 1916, 1917, 1920, 1942, 1959-II, 1975, 1979
- Panamerican Championship
  - (gold) Champions (2): 1952, 1956
  - (silver) Runners-up (1): 1960
- CONCACAF Gold Cup
  - (silver) Runners-up (2): 1996, 2003
  - (bronze) Third place (1): 1998

=== Friendly ===
- Roca Cup (8): 1914, 1922, 1945, 1957, 1960, 1963, 1971^{s}, 1976
- Copa Rodrigues Alves (2): 1922, 1923
- Copa Confraternidad (1): 1923
- Copa Río Branco (7): 1931, 1932, 1947, 1950, 1967^{s}, 1968, 1976
- Taça Interventor Federal (1): 1934
- Taça Dois de Julho (1): 1934
- Taça Oswaldo Cruz (8): 1950, 1955, 1956, 1958, 1961, 1962, 1968, 1976
- Copa Bernardo O'Higgins (4): 1955, 1959, 1961, 1966^{s}
- Taça do Atlântico (3): 1956, 1970, 1976
- Taça Jorge Chavéz / Santos Dumont (1): 1968
- Copa Emílio Garrastazú Médici (1): 1970
- Taça Independência (1): 1972
- U.S.A. Bicentennial Cup Tournament (1): 1976
- Taça Centenário Jornal O Fluminense (1): 1978
- Saudi Crown Prince Trophy (1): 1978
- Rous Cup (1): 1987
- Australia Bicentenary Gold Cup (1): 1988
- Copa Teixeira (1): 1990^{s}
- Amistad Cup (1): 1992
- Copa 50imo Aniversario de Clarín (1): 1995
- Umbro Cup (1): 1995
- Nelson Mandela Challenge (1): 1996
- Lunar New Year Cup (1): 2005
- Superclásico de las Américas (4): 2011, 2012, 2014, 2018
- Kirin Challenge Cup (1): 2022

=== Awards ===
- FIFA Team of the Year (13): 1994, 1995, 1996, 1997, 1998, 1999, 2000, 2002, 2003, 2004, 2005, 2006, 2022
- FIFA Fair Play Award (1): 2023
- Laureus World Team of the Year (1): 2003
- World Soccer Team of the Year (2): 1982, 2002
- Gazzetta Sports World Team of the Year (2): 1994, 2002
- Prince of Asturias Award for Sports (1): 2002
- FIFA World Cup Fair Play Trophy (4): 1982, 1986, 1994, 2006
- FIFA World Cup Most Entertaining Team (1): 1994
- FIFA Confederations Cup Fair Play Trophy (2): 1999, 2009
- Copa America Fair Play Award (2): 2019, 2021

=== Chronology of titles ===
Host nation	Tournament	Year
Brazil	Copa América	1919
Brazil	Copa América	1922
Brazil	Copa América	1949
Chile	Panamerican Championship	1952
Mexico	Panamerican Championship	1956
Sweden	FIFA World Cup	1958
Chile	FIFA World Cup	1962
Mexico	FIFA World Cup	1970
Brazil	Copa América	1989
United States	FIFA World Cup	1994
Bolivia	Copa América	1997
Saudi Arabia	FIFA Confederations Cup	1997
Paraguay	Copa América	1999
South Korea–Japan	FIFA World Cup	2002
Peru	Copa América	2004
Germany	FIFA Confederations Cup	2005
Venezuela	Copa América	2007
South Africa	FIFA Confederations Cup	2009
Brazil	FIFA Confederations Cup	2013
Brazil	Copa América	2019

=== Summary ===
Competition	1st place, gold medalist(s)	2nd place, silver medalist(s)	3rd place, bronze medalist(s)	Total
FIFA World Cup	5	2	2	9
FIFA Confederations Cup	4	1	0	5
CONMEBOL Copa América	9	12	7	28
Panamerican Championship^{2}	2	1	0	3
CONCACAF Gold Cup	0	2	1	3
Total	20	18	10	48

Notes

1. Official continental competition organized by PFC. It was a unified confederation of the Americas, which was formed by the NAFC, CCCF and CONMEBOL.
- ^{s} Shared titles.

== See also ==
- Brazil national football team results (2010–present)
- Brazil national under-23 football team
- Brazil national under-20 football team
- Brazil national under-17 football team
- Brazil national futsal team
- Brazil national beach soccer team
- List of Brazil national football team managers
- Pra Frente Brasil
- Sport in Brazil
- Argentina–Brazil football rivalry
- Brazil–Uruguay football rivalry
- Brazil–Italy football rivalry

== Notes ==
Achievements
Preceded by 1954 West Germany	World Champions; 1958 (first title); 1962 (second title)	Succeeded by 1966 England
Preceded by 1966 England	World Champions; 1970 (third title)	Succeeded by 1974 West Germany
Preceded by 1990 West Germany	World Champions; 1994 (fourth title)	Succeeded by 1998 France
Preceded by 1998 France	World Champions; 2002 (fifth title)	Succeeded by 2006 Italy
Preceded by 1995 Denmark	Confederations Cup Champions; 1997 (first title)	Succeeded by 1999 Mexico
Preceded by 2003 France	Confederations Cup Champions; 2005 (second title); 2009 (third title); 2013 (fourth title)	Succeeded by 2017 Germany
Preceded by 1917 Uruguay	South American Champions; 1919 (first title)	Succeeded by 1920 Uruguay
Preceded by 1921 Argentina	South American Champions; 1922 (second title)	Succeeded by 1923 Uruguay
Preceded by 1947 Argentina	South American Champions; 1949 (third title)	Succeeded by 1953 Paraguay
Preceded by 1987 Uruguay	South American Champions; 1989 (fourth title)	Succeeded by 1991 Argentina
Preceded by 1995 Uruguay	South American Champions; 1997 (fifth title); 1999 (sixth title)	Succeeded by 2001 Colombia
Preceded by 2001 Colombia	South American Champions; 2004 (seventh title); 2007 (eighth title)	Succeeded by 2011 Uruguay
Awards
Preceded by Germany	FIFA Team of the Year; 1994–1999	Succeeded by Netherlands
Preceded by Honduras	FIFA Team of the Year; 2002–2006	Succeeded by Argentina
Preceded by Manuel Estiarte	Prince of Asturias Award for Sports; 2002	Succeeded by Tour de France
Preceded by Australia national cricket team	Laureus World Team of the Year; 2003	Succeeded by England national rugby union team
