= 1917 South American Championship squads =

Football squads

These are the squads for the countries that played in the 1917 South American Championship. The participating countries were Argentina, Brazil, Chile and Uruguay. The teams played in a single round-robin tournament, earning two points for a win, one point for a draw, and zero points for a loss.

== Argentina ==
Head Coach: n/i (Note: The first appointed coach of the Argentina national team was Ángel Vásquez in 1924.)

No.	Pos.	Player	Date of birth (age)	Caps	Goals	Club
—	FW	Antonio Blanco		1	0	(Argentine Football Association) Rosario Central
—	DF	Eduardo Blanco	1 January 1897 (aged 20)	2	0	(Argentine Football Association) Rosario Central
—	FW	Pedro Calomino	13 March 1892 (aged 25)	4	2	(Argentine Football Association) Boca Juniors
—	FW	Edwin Clarke		0	0	(Argentine Football Association) Porteño
—	GK	Marcos Crocce	6 March 1894 (aged 23)	1	0	(Argentine Football Association) Racing Club
—	FW	Jaime Chavín	25 July 1899 (aged 18)	0	0	(Argentine Football Association) Huracán
—	DF	Alejandro Elordi	26 February 1894 (aged 23)	0	0	(Argentine Football Association) Ferro Carril Oeste
—	DF	Antonio Ferro	17 March 1896 (aged 21)	3	0	(Argentine Football Association) Independiente
—	MF	Pascual Garré		1	0	(Argentine Football Association) Independiente
—	FW	Ennis Hayes	10 May 1896 (aged 21)	5	2	(Argentine Football Association) Rosario Central
—	GK	Carlos Isola	6 March 1896 (aged 21)	8	0	(Argentine Football Association) River Plate
—	DF	Juan Madero		0	0	(Argentine Football Association) Estudiantes (BA)
—	FW	Alfredo Martín	30 April 1894 (aged 23)	0	0	(Argentine Football Association) Tigre
—	MF	Pedro Martínez	19 May 1893 (aged 24)	7	0	(Argentine Football Association) Huracán
—	DF	Ernesto Matozzi	19 May 1895 (aged 22)	6	0	(Argentine Football Association) Estudiantil Porteño
—	FW	Alberto Ohaco	12 January 1889 (aged 28)	11	5	(Argentine Football Association) Racing Club
—	MF	Francisco Olazar	10 July 1885 (aged 32)	9	0	(Argentine Football Association) Racing Club
—	MF	Ricardo Pepe	1 January 1896 (aged 21)	1	0	(Argentine Football Association) Racing Club
—	FW	Juan Perinetti	10 October 1891 (aged 25)	6	0	(Argentine Football Association) Racing Club
—	DF	Armando Reyes	28 October 1893 (aged 23)	9	0	(Argentine Football Association) Racing Club
—	FW	Nicolás Vivaldo	1 January 1896 (aged 21)	3	0	(Argentine Football Association) Racing Club

== Brazil ==
Head coach: (Brazil) Sílvio Lagreca

No.	Pos.	Player	Date of birth (age)	Caps	Goals	Club
—	MF	Adhemar	11 August 1896 (aged 21)	0	0	(Brazilian Football Confederation) America (RJ)
—	FW	Amílcar	29 April 1893 (aged 24)	3	0	(Brazilian Football Confederation) Corinthians
—	FW	Arnaldo	6 August 1884 (aged 33)	6	0	(Brazilian Football Confederation) Santos
—	FW	Caetano Izzo	11 May 1897 (aged 20)	0	0	(Brazilian Football Confederation) Palestra Itália
—	GK	Casemiro	14 November 1892 (aged 24)	2	0	(Brazilian Football Confederation) Mackenzie
—	DF	Chico Netto	9 April 1894 (aged 23)	0	0	(Brazilian Football Confederation) Fluminense
—	FW	José da Silva Couto		0	0	(Brazilian Football Confederation) Fluminense
—	DF	Antonio Dias De Paiva		0	0	(Brazilian Football Confederation) America (RJ)
—	FW	Dias	20 August 1893 (aged 24)	0	0	(Brazilian Football Confederation) São Bento (SP)
—	MF	Galo	2 July 1893 (aged 24)	3	0	(Brazilian Football Confederation) Flamengo
—	MF	Haroldo	18 March 1896 (aged 21)	0	0	(Brazilian Football Confederation) Santos
—	MF	Lagreca	16 June 1895 (aged 22)	6	0	(Brazilian Football Confederation) São Bento (SP)
—	FW	Millon	16 September 1895 (aged 22)	2	0	(Brazilian Football Confederation) Santos
—	FW	Neco	7 March 1895 (aged 22)	0	0	(Brazilian Football Confederation) Corinthians
—	GK	Otto		0	0	(Brazilian Football Confederation) Santos
—	DF	Osny	11 October 1898 (aged 18)	1	0	(Brazilian Football Confederation) Botafogo
—	MF	Paula Ramos	4 May 1895 (aged 22)	0	0	(Brazilian Football Confederation) America (RJ)
—	MF	Picagli	21 April 1893 (aged 24)	0	0	(Brazilian Football Confederation) Palestra Itália
—	DF	Vidal	1 October 1896 (aged 20)	0	0	(Brazilian Football Confederation) Fluminense

== Chile ==
Head Coach: (Uruguay) Julián Bertola Alareo

No.	Pos.	Player	Date of birth (age)	Caps	Goals	Club
—	MF	Juan Alvarado	1 December 1893 (aged 23)	0	0	(Football Federation of Chile) Artillero de Costa
—	DF	Héctor Baeza		0	0	(Football Federation of Chile) Santiago Wanderers
—	FW	Hernando Bolados		0	0	(Football Federation of Chile) Union Marítimo FC
—	DF	Enrique Cárdenas		6	0	(Football Federation of Chile) Santiago Wanderers
—	MF	Guillermo Cisternas	16 March 1891 (aged 26)	0	0	(Football Federation of Chile) Maestranza
—	FW	Luis Encina		0	0	(Football Federation of Chile) Norteamérica
—	DF	Luis García		0	0	(Football Federation of Chile) Thunder
—	DF	Francisco Gatica		0	0	(Football Federation of Chile) Eleuterio Ramírez Football Club
—	FW	Manuel Jeldes	14 August 1894 (aged 23)	5	0	(Football Federation of Chile) Santiago Wanderers
—	GK	Manuel Guerrero	12 October 1896 (aged 20)	3	0	(Football Federation of Chile) La Cruz
—	MF	Norberto Guevara	31 January 1892 (aged 25)	0	0	(Football Federation of Chile) Gold Cross
—	FW	Bartolo Muñoz	29 March 1892 (aged 25)	0	0	(Football Federation of Chile) Fernández Vial
—	FW	Horacio Muñoz	18 May 1896 (aged 21)	0	0	(Football Federation of Chile) Fernández Vial
—	FW	Julio Paredes		0	0	(Football Federation of Chile) Talca Nacional
—	FW	Rodolfo Rojas		0	0	(Football Federation of Chile) Loma Blanca

== Uruguay ==
Head Coach: (Uruguay) Ramón Platero

No.	Pos.	Player	Date of birth (age)	Caps	Goals	Club
—	GK	Alfredo Balmelli		1	0	(Uruguayan Football Association) Central Español
—	MF	N. Bartolazzo		0	0	(Uruguayan Football Association) River Plate FC
—	DF	José Pedro Benincasa	16 June 1891 (aged 26)	27	0	(Uruguayan Football Association) Peñarol
—	DF	Miguel Benincasa	30 November 1888 (aged 28)	3	0	(Uruguayan Football Association) River Plate FC
—	MF	Sadí Couture		0	0	(Uruguayan Football Association) Dublin
—	DF	Alfredo Foglino	1 February 1893 (aged 24)	21	0	(Uruguayan Football Association) Nacional
—	FW	Raúl Garrido		0	0	(Uruguayan Football Association) Universal
—	FW	Isabelino Gradín	8 July 1897 (aged 20)	7	3	(Uruguayan Football Association) Peñarol
—	FW	Rodolfo Marán	24 May 1897 (aged 20)	5	0	(Uruguayan Football Association) Nacional
—	FW	Antonio Márques Castro		5	2	(Uruguayan Football Association) Peñarol
—	FW	Carlos Mongelar		4	2	(Uruguayan Football Association) Universal
—	MF	Nelson Montes		0	0	(Uruguayan Football Association) Montevideo Wanderers
—	DF	Jorge Pacheco	26 October 1889 (aged 27)	30	0	(Uruguayan Football Association) Peñarol
—	FW	José Pérez	30 November 1897 (aged 19)	12	1	(Uruguayan Football Association) Peñarol
—	FW	José Piendibene	5 June 1890 (aged 27)	30	14	(Uruguayan Football Association) Peñarol
—	MF	Abdón Porte	1 January 1893 (aged 24)	1	1	(Uruguayan Football Association) Nacional
—	FW	Gregorio Rodríguez		3	0	(Uruguayan Football Association) Universal
—	FW	Ángel Romano	2 August 1893 (aged 24)	21	5	(Uruguayan Football Association) Nacional
—	GK	Cayetano Saporiti	14 January 1897 (aged 20)	45	0	(Uruguayan Football Association) Montevideo Wanderers
—	FW	Carlos Scarone	10 November 1888 (aged 28)	16	8	(Uruguayan Football Association) Nacional
—	FW	Héctor Scarone	26 November 1898 (aged 18)	1	0	(Uruguayan Football Association) Nacional
—	FW	Pascual Somma	2 February 1891 (aged 26)	10	0	(Uruguayan Football Association) Nacional
—	MF	José Tognola		5	1	(Uruguayan Football Association) Reformers
—	DF	Antonio Urdinarán	30 October 1898 (aged 18)	4	0	(Uruguayan Football Association) Defensor Sporting
—	MF	José Vanzzino	5 July 1893 (aged 24)	9	0	(Uruguayan Football Association) Nacional
—	DF	Manuel Varela	1 January 1892 (aged 25)	10	0	(Uruguayan Football Association) Peñarol
—	FW	Juan José Villar		0	0	(Uruguayan Football Association) Montevideo Wanderers
—	MF	Armando Zibechi	21 January 1896 (aged 21)	0	0	(Uruguayan Football Association) Montevideo Wanderers
