= 1916 South American Championship squads =

Football squads

These are the squads for the countries that played in the 1916 South American Championship. The participating countries were Argentina, Brazil, Chile and Uruguay. The teams played in a single round-robin tournament, earning two points for a win, one point for a draw, and zero points for a loss.

== Argentina ==
Head Coach: Not available or unknown (Note: The first appointed coach of the Argentina national team was Ángel Vásquez in 1924.)

| No. | Pos. | Player | Date of birth (age) | Caps | Goals | Club |
|---|---|---|---|---|---|---|
| — | MF | Gerónimo Badaracco | | 12 | 0 | (Argentine Football Association) San Isidro |
| — | FW | Claudio Bincaz | 10 May 1897 (aged 19) | 0 | 0 | (Argentine Football Association) San Isidro |
| — | FW | Juan Cabano | 8 July 1896 (aged 19) | 1 | 0 | (Argentine Football Association) Argentino de Quilmes |
| — | DF | Juan Domingo Brown | 21 June 1888 (aged 28) | 36 | 0 | (Argentine Football Association) Quilmes |
| — | DF | Arturo Chiappe | 24 March 1889 (aged 27) | 15 | 0 | (Argentine Football Association) River Plate |
| — | DF | Zenón Díaz | 8 February 1881 (aged 35) | 8 | 0 | (Argentine Football Association) Rosario Central |
| — | MF | Cándido García | 2 December 1895 (aged 20) | 3 | 0 | (Argentine Football Association) River Plate |
| — | FW | Carlos Guidi | | 7 | 4 | (Argentine Football Association) Tiro Federal |
| — | FW | Ennis Hayes | 10 May 1896 (aged 20) | 4 | 2 | (Argentine Football Association) Rosario Central |
| — | FW | Juan Enrique Hayes | 20 January 1891 (aged 25) | 22 | 9 | (Argentine Football Association) Rosario Central |
| — | FW | Adolfo Heisinger | 30 May 1898 (aged 18) | 1 | 1 | (Argentine Football Association) Tigre |
| — | FW | Juan Hospital | 1 January 1893 (aged 23) | 6 | 1 | (Argentine Football Association) Racing Club |
| — | GK | Carlos Isola | 6 March 1896 (aged 20) | 4 | 0 | (Argentine Football Association) River Plate |
| — | FW | José Durand Laguna | 7 November 1885 (aged 30) | 0 | 0 | (Argentine Football Association) Huracán |
| — | FW | Alberto Marcovecchio | 6 March 1893 (aged 23) | 7 | 3 | (Argentine Football Association) Racing Club |
| — | MF | Pedro Martínez | 19 May 1893 (aged 23) | 3 | 0 | (Argentine Football Association) Huracán |
| — | MF | Ricardo Naón | | 2 | 0 | (Argentine Football Association) Gimnasia y Esgrima (LP) |
| — | FW | Alberto Ohaco | 12 January 1889 (aged 27) | 11 | 3 | (Argentine Football Association) Racing Club |
| — | MF | Francisco Olazar | 10 July 1885 (aged 30) | 3 | 0 | (Argentine Football Association) Racing Club |
| — | FW | Juan Perinetti | 1 January 1891 (aged 25) | 4 | 0 | (Argentine Football Association) Racing Club |
| — | DF | Armando Reyes | 28 October 1893 (aged 22) | 4 | 0 | (Argentine Football Association) Racing Club |
| — | GK | Juan José Rithner | 5 January 1890 (aged 26) | 13 | 0 | (Argentine Football Association) Porteño |
| — | GK | Carlos Wilson | 1 January 1889 (aged 27) | 26 | 0 | (Argentine Football Association) San Isidro |

== Brazil ==
Head coach: (Brazil) Sílvio Lagreca

| No. | Pos. | Player | Date of birth (age) | Caps | Goals | Club |
|---|---|---|---|---|---|---|
| — | FW | Alencar | 6 September 1892 (aged 23) | 0 | 0 | (Brazilian Football Confederation) Americano |
| — | MF | Amílcar | 29 March 1893 (aged 23) | 0 | 0 | (Brazilian Football Confederation) Corinthians |
| — | FW | Arnaldo | 6 August 1894 (aged 21) | 2 | 0 | (Brazilian Football Confederation) Santos |
| — | DF | Carlito | 17 November 1896 (aged 19) | 0 | 0 | (Brazilian Football Confederation) Paulistano |
| — | GK | Casemiro | 14 September 1892 (aged 23) | 0 | 0 | (Brazilian Football Confederation) Mackenzie |
| — | FW | Demóstenes | 17 January 1892 (aged 24) | 0 | 0 | (Brazilian Football Confederation) Palestra Itália |
| — | MF | Giacomo Facchini | 25 February 1897 (aged 19) | 0 | 0 | (Brazilian Football Confederation) Campos Elíseos |
| — | FW | Arthur Friedenreich | 18 July 1892 (aged 23) | 2 | 0 | (Brazilian Football Confederation) Paysandu |
| — | MF | Galo | 2 July 1893 (aged 23) | 0 | 0 | (Brazilian Football Confederation) Flamengo |
| — | MF | Lagreca | 14 June 1895 (aged 21) | 0 | 0 | (Brazilian Football Confederation) São Bento-SP |
| — | MF | Alberto Martins | | 0 | 0 | (Brazilian Football Confederation) União Lapa |
| — | FW | Luís Menezes | 1 April 1897 (aged 19) | 0 | 0 | (Brazilian Football Confederation) Botafogo |
| — | MF | Lulu Rocha | | 0 | 0 | (Brazilian Football Confederation) Botafogo |
| — | GK | Marcos | 25 December 1894 (aged 21) | 2 | 0 | (Brazilian Football Confederation) Fluminense |
| — | FW | Mimi | 10 April 1892 (aged 24) | 0 | 0 | (Brazilian Football Confederation) Botafogo |
| — | DF | Nery | 25 December 1892 (aged 23) | 0 | 0 | (Brazilian Football Confederation) Flamengo |
| — | DF | Orlando | 21 April 1895 (aged 21) | 0 | 0 | (Brazilian Football Confederation) Paulistano |
| — | DF | Osny | 11 December 1898 (aged 17) | 0 | 0 | (Brazilian Football Confederation) Botafogo |
| — | MF | Sidney | 14 July 1895 (aged 20) | 0 | 0 | (Brazilian Football Confederation) Flamengo |

== Chile ==
Head Coach: (Chile) Carlos Fanta

| No. | Pos. | Player | Date of birth (age) | Caps | Goals | Club |
|---|---|---|---|---|---|---|
| — | MF | Enrique Abello | 27 October 1892 (aged 23) | 0 | 0 | (Football Federation of Chile) Magallanes |
| — | DF | Adán Aguirre | | 0 | 0 | (Football Federation of Chile) Lusitania |
| — | FW | Ángel Báez | 8 August 1894 (aged 21) | 0 | 0 | (Football Federation of Chile) Thunder |
| — | MF | Arturo Besoaín | | 0 | 0 | (Football Federation of Chile) Instituto Nacional |
| — | DF | Enrique Cárdenas | 17 May 1891 (aged 25) | 1 | 0 | (Football Federation of Chile) Santiago Wanderers |
| — | FW | Alfredo France | 29 October 1895 (aged 20) | 0 | 0 | (Football Federation of Chile) Estrella del Mar |
| — | FW | Eufemio Fuentes | | 0 | 0 | (Football Federation of Chile) La Cruz |
| — | MF | Próspero González | 30 September 1886 (aged 29) | 3 | 0 | (Football Federation of Chile) Arco Iris |
| — | GK | Manuel Guerrero | 12 October 1895 (aged 20) | 0 | 0 | (Football Federation of Chile) La Cruz |
| — | FW | Enrique Gutiérrez | 4 February 1892 (aged 24) | 0 | 0 | (Football Federation of Chile) Magallanes |
| — | FW | Manuel Jeldes | 14 August 1894 (aged 21) | 1 | 0 | (Football Federation of Chile) Santiago Wanderers |
| — | FW | Roberto Moreno | | 0 | 0 | (Football Federation of Chile) Nacional Star |
| — | GK | Jorge Paredes | | 0 | 0 | (Football Federation of Chile) Nacional Star |
| — | FW | Hernando Salazar | | 0 | 0 | (Football Federation of Chile) Thunder |
| — | MF | Enrique Teuche | 16 March 1894 (aged 22) | 1 | 0 | (Football Federation of Chile) Cinco de Abril |
| — | MF | Ramón Unzaga | 18 July 1892 (aged 23) | 0 | 0 | (Football Federation of Chile) Estrella del Mar |
| — | FW | Erasmo Vásquez | | 0 | 0 | (Football Federation of Chile) La Cruz |
| — | DF | Marcos Wittke | 8 October 1896 (aged 19) | 0 | 0 | (Football Federation of Chile) Magallanes |

== Uruguay ==
Head Coach: (Uruguay) Alfredo Foglino

| No. | Pos. | Player | Date of birth (age) | Caps | Goals | Club |
|---|---|---|---|---|---|---|
| — | DF | Miguel Benincasa | 30 November 1888 (aged 27) | 1 | 0 | (Uruguayan Football Association) River Plate FC |
| — | FW | José Brachi | 26 December 1892 (aged 23) | 12 | 3 | (Uruguayan Football Association) Nacional |
| — | DF | Francisco Castellino | 20 February 1893 (aged 23) | 3 | 0 | (Uruguayan Football Association) Nacional |
| — | MF | Pablo Dacal | 30 June 1886 (aged 30) | 28 | 6 | (Uruguayan Football Association) Nacional |
| — | MF | Juan Delgado | 26 February 1891 (aged 25) | 4 | 0 | (Uruguayan Football Association) Central Español |
| — | DF | Alfredo Foglino | 1 February 1893 (aged 23) | 15 | 0 | (Uruguayan Football Association) Nacional |
| — | FW | Isabelino Gradín | 8 July 1897 (aged 18) | 1 | 0 | (Uruguayan Football Association) Peñarol |
| — | FW | Rodolfo Marán | 24 May 1897 (aged 19) | 0 | 0 | (Uruguayan Football Association) Universal |
| — | MF | Jorge Germán Pacheco | 26 October 1889 (aged 26) | 25 | 0 | (Uruguayan Football Association) Peñarol |
| — | FW | José Pérez | 30 November 1897 (aged 18) | 8 | 1 | (Uruguayan Football Association) Peñarol |
| — | FW | José Piendibene | 5 June 1890 (aged 26) | 24 | 12 | (Uruguayan Football Association) Peñarol |
| — | FW | Ángel Romano | 2 August 1893 (aged 22) | 14 | 4 | (Uruguayan Football Association) Nacional |
| — | GK | Cayetano Saporiti | 14 January 1887 (aged 29) | 36 | 0 | (Uruguayan Football Association) Montevideo Wanderers |
| — | MF | Pascual Somma | 2 February 1891 (aged 25) | 2 | 0 | (Uruguayan Football Association) Nacional |
| — | MF | José Tognola | | 3 | 0 | (Uruguayan Football Association) Reformers |
| — | MF | Antonio Urdinarán | 30 October 1898 (aged 17) | 0 | 0 | (Uruguayan Football Association) Defensor Sporting |
| — | MF | José Vanzzino | 5 July 1893 (aged 22) | 4 | 0 | (Uruguayan Football Association) Nacional |
| — | DF | Manuel Varela | 1 January 1892 (aged 24) | 4 | 0 | (Uruguayan Football Association) Peñarol |
| — | DF | Alfredo Zibechi | 30 October 1894 (aged 21) | 1 | 0 | (Uruguayan Football Association) Montevideo Wanderers |
