= 1919 South American Championship squads =

Football squads

The following are the squads of national teams that played in the 1919 South American Championship. The participating countries were Argentina, Brazil, Chile and Uruguay. The teams played in a single round-robin tournament, earning two points for a win, one point for a draw, and zero points for a loss.

== Argentina ==
Head Coach: Federal Technical Committee

No.	Pos.	Player	Date of birth (age)	Caps	Goals	Club
—	GK	Andrés Barcos		0	0	(Argentina) Estudiantes (LP)
—	FW	Enrique Brichetto		0	0	(Argentina) Boca Juniors
—	FW	Pedro Calomino	13 March 1892 (aged 27)	13	3	(Argentina) Boca Juniors
—	DF	Roberto Castagnola	1 January 1899 (aged 20)	0	0	(Argentina) Racing Club
—	MF	Juan Cilley	22 February 1898 (aged 21)	0	0	(Argentina) San Isidro
—	FW	Edwin Clarke		1	0	(Argentina) Porteño
—	DF	Antonio Cortella	11 October 1896 (aged 22)	2	0	(Argentina) Boca Juniors
—	FW	Miguel Faivre		0	0	(Argentina) Gimnasia y Esgrima (Rosario)
—	MF	Roberto Felices		0	0	(Argentina) Gimnasia y Esgrima (LP)
—	GK	Carlos Isola	6 March 1896 (aged 23)	18	0	(Argentina) River Plate
—	FW	Carlos Izaguirre	30 May 1895 (aged 23)	5	3	(Argentina) Porteño
—	FW	José Laiolo	19 May 1897 (aged 21)	3	2	(Argentina) River Plate
—	FW	Alfredo Martín	30 April 1894 (aged 25)	8	2	(Argentina) Boca Juniors
—	MF	Pedro Martínez	19 May 1893 (aged 25)	9	0	(Argentina) Huracán
—	DF	Ernesto Matozzi	19 May 1895 (aged 23)	15	0	(Argentina) Estudiantil Porteño
—	FW	Juan Perinetti	10 October 1891 (aged 27)	9	0	(Argentina) Racing Club
—	DF	Armando Reyes	28 October 1893 (aged 25)	18	0	(Argentina) Racing Club
—	FW	Nicolás Rofrano		4	0	(Argentina) River Plate
—	MF	Emilio Sande		0	0	(Argentina) Porteño
—	MF	Ernesto Scoffano		0	0	(Argentina) Eureka
—	MF	Eduardo Uslenghi		0	0	(Argentina) Porteño

== Brazil ==
Head coach: (Brazil) Haroldo Domingues

No.	Pos.	Player	Date of birth (age)	Caps	Goals	Club
—	MF	Amílcar	29 April 1893 (aged 26)	7	1	(Brazil) Corinthians
—	FW	Arlindo	30 December 1899 (aged 19)	0	0	(Brazil) América (RJ)
—	FW	Arnaldo	6 August 1884 (aged 34)	10	0	(Brazil) Santos
—	DF	Bianco	18 July 1893 (aged 25)	0	0	(Brazil) Palestra Itália
—	FW	Carregal	14 April 1898 (aged 21)	0	0	(Brazil) Flamengo
—	GK	Dyonísio		0	0	(Brazil) Ypiranga (SP)
—	MF	Fortes	9 September 1901 (aged 17)	0	0	(Brazil) Fluminense
—	FW	Friedenreich	18 July 1892 (aged 26)	6	1	(Brazil) Paulistano
—	MF	Galo	2 July 1893 (aged 25)	6	0	(Brazil) Flamengo
—	FW	Haroldo	18 March 1896 (aged 23)	2	2	(Brazil) Santos
—	FW	Heitor	20 December 1898 (aged 20)	0	0	(Brazil) Palestra Itália
—	MF	Laís	11 January 1899 (aged 20)	0	0	(Brazil) Fluminense
—	GK	Marcos	25 December 1894 (aged 24)	3	0	(Brazil) Fluminense
—	MF	Martins	30 August 1901 (aged 17)	0	0	(Brazil) São Cristóvão
—	FW	Luís Menezes	1 April 1897 (aged 22)	4	0	(Brazil) Botafogo
—	FW	Millon	16 September 1895 (aged 23)	2	0	(Brazil) Santos
—	FW	Neco	7 March 1895 (aged 24)	4	3	(Brazil) Corinthians
—	DF	Palamone	21 March 1898 (aged 21)	0	0	(Brazil) Mackenzie
—	MF	Picagli	21 April 1893 (aged 26)	1	0	(Brazil) Palestra Itália
—	DF	Píndaro	1 June 1892 (aged 26)	2	0	(Brazil) Flamengo
—	MF	Sérgio	16 June 1898 (aged 20)	0	0	(Brazil) Paulistano

== Chile ==
Head Coach: (Chile) Héctor Parra

No.	Pos.	Player	Date of birth (age)	Caps	Goals	Club
—	MF	Juan Alvarado	1 December 1893 (aged 25)	3	0	(Chile) Santiago Wanderers
—	FW	Telésforo Báez	16 August 1897 (aged 21)	0	0	(Chile) Santiago Wanderers
—	MF	Héctor Baeza		2	0	(Chile) Deportes Rancagua
—	FW	Carlos del Río		0	0	(Chile) Liceo de Concepción
—	MF	Aurelio Domínguez	31 May 1896 (aged 22)	0	0	(Chile) Artillero de Costa
—	FW	Guillermo Frez	19 November 1898 (aged 20)	0	0	(Chile) La Cruz
—	FW	Alfredo France	29 October 1895 (aged 23)	4	1	(Chile) Estrella del Mar
—	FW	Eufemio Fuentes		3	0	(Chile) Estrella del Mar
—	DF	Francisco Gatica		4	0	(Chile) Eleuterio Ramírez
—	DF	Pedro Gatica		0	0	(Chile) Eleuterio Ramírez
—	MF	Óscar González	24 August 1894 (aged 24)	1	0	(Chile) The Commercial
—	GK	Manuel Guerrero	13 October 1896 (aged 22)	6	0	(Chile) La Cruz
—	FW	Horacio Muñoz	18 May 1896 (aged 22)	3	0	(Chile) Fernández Vial
—	DF	Ulises Poirier	2 February 1897 (aged 22)	0	0	(Chile) La Cruz
—	FW	Víctor Varas		0	0	(Chile) Artillero de Costa

== Uruguay ==
Head Coach: (Uruguay) Severino Castillo

No.	Pos.	Player	Date of birth (age)	Caps	Goals	Club
—	DF	José Benincasa	16 June 1891 (aged 27)	31	0	(Uruguay) Peñarol
—	GK	Roberto Chery	16 February 1896 (aged 23)	0	0	(Uruguay) Peñarol
—	MF	Juan Delgado	26 February 1891 (aged 28)	10	0	(Uruguay) Peñarol
—	DF	Alfredo Foglino	1 February 1893 (aged 26)	28	0	(Uruguay) Nacional
—	FW	Isabelino Gradín	8 July 1897 (aged 21)	12	4	(Uruguay) Peñarol
—	FW	Rodolfo Marán	24 May 1897 (aged 21)	5	0	(Uruguay) Nacional
—	MF	Ricardo Medina		2	0	(Uruguay) Central Español
—	MF	Rogelio Naguil		0	0	(Uruguay) Nacional
—	MF	José Pérez	30 November 1897 (aged 21)	18	1	(Uruguay) Peñarol
—	MF	Omar Pérez		0	0	(Uruguay) Montevideo Wanderers
—	FW	Angel Romano	2 August 1893 (aged 25)	29	11	(Uruguay) Nacional
—	GK	Cayetano Saporiti	14 January 1897 (aged 22)	53	0	(Uruguay) Montevideo Wanderers
—	FW	Carlos Scarone	10 November 1888 (aged 30)	20	12	(Uruguay) Nacional
—	FW	Héctor Scarone	26 November 1898 (aged 20)	8	3	(Uruguay) Nacional
—	FW	Pascual Somma	2 February 1891 (aged 28)	15	1	(Uruguay) Nacional
—	MF	José Vanzzino	5 July 1893 (aged 25)	16	0	(Uruguay) Nacional
—	DF	Manuel Varela	1 January 1892 (aged 27)	11	0	(Uruguay) Peñarol
—	DF	Alfredo Zibechi	30 October 1895 (aged 23)	8	0	(Uruguay) Nacional
