= 1917 in Brazilian football =

Football in Brazil
- Season: 1917

The following article presents a summary of the 1917 football (soccer) season in Brazil, which was the 16th season of competitive football in the country.

== Campeonato Paulista ==
Final Standings

Position	Team	Points	Played	Won	Drawn	Lost	For	Against	Difference
1	Paulistano	27	16	12	3	1	41	17	24
2	Palestra Itália-SP	25	16	10	5	1	41	18	23
3	Corinthians	19	16	8	3	5	39	26	13
4	Santos	18	16	8	2	6	44	36	8
5	AA das Palmeiras	17	16	7	3	6	32	27	5
6	Ypiranga-SP	15	16	6	3	7	34	37	−3
7	AA São Bento	9	16	3	3	10	23	41	−18
8	SC Internacional de São Paulo	7	16	3	1	12	25	58	−33
9	Mackenzie	5	16	1	3	12	21	40	−19

Paulistano declared as the Campeonato Paulista champions.

== State championship champions ==
State	Champion
Amazonas	Nacional
Bahia	Ypiranga-BA
Espírito Santo	América-ES
Minas Gerais	América-MG
Paraná	América-PR
Pernambuco	Sport Recife
Rio de Janeiro (DF)	Fluminense
São Paulo	Paulistano

== Brazil national team ==
The following table lists all the games played by the Brazil national football team in official competitions and friendly matches during 1917.

Date	Opposition	Result	Score	Brazil scorers	Competition
January 7, 1917	(Uruguay) Dublin	D	0–0	–	International Friendly (unofficial match)
May 6, 1917	(Argentina) Barracas	D	1–1	Friedenreich	International Friendly (unofficial match)
May 13, 1917	(Argentina) Barracas	W	2–1	Heitor Dominguez, Arnaldo	International Friendly (unofficial match)
October 3, 1917	Argentina	L	2–4	Neco, Lagreca	South American Championship
October 7, 1917	Uruguay	L	0–4	–	South American Championship
October 12, 1917	Chile	W	5–0	Caetano, Neco, Amílcar, Haroldo (2)	South American Championship
October 16, 1917	Uruguay	L	1–3	Neco	International Friendly
