= Coquimbo =

- City and Commune
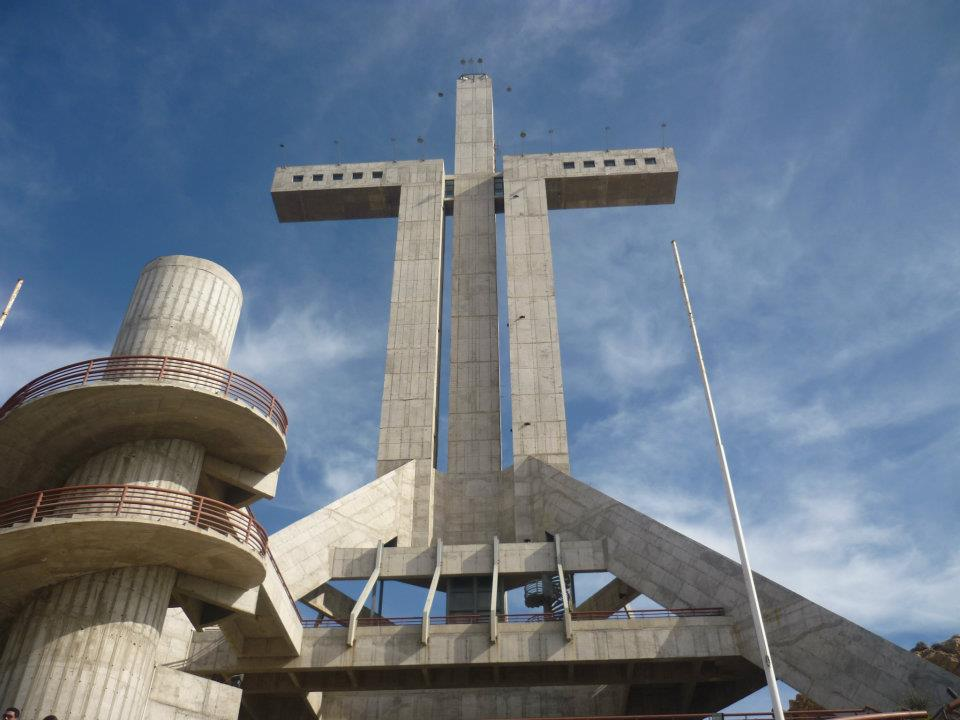
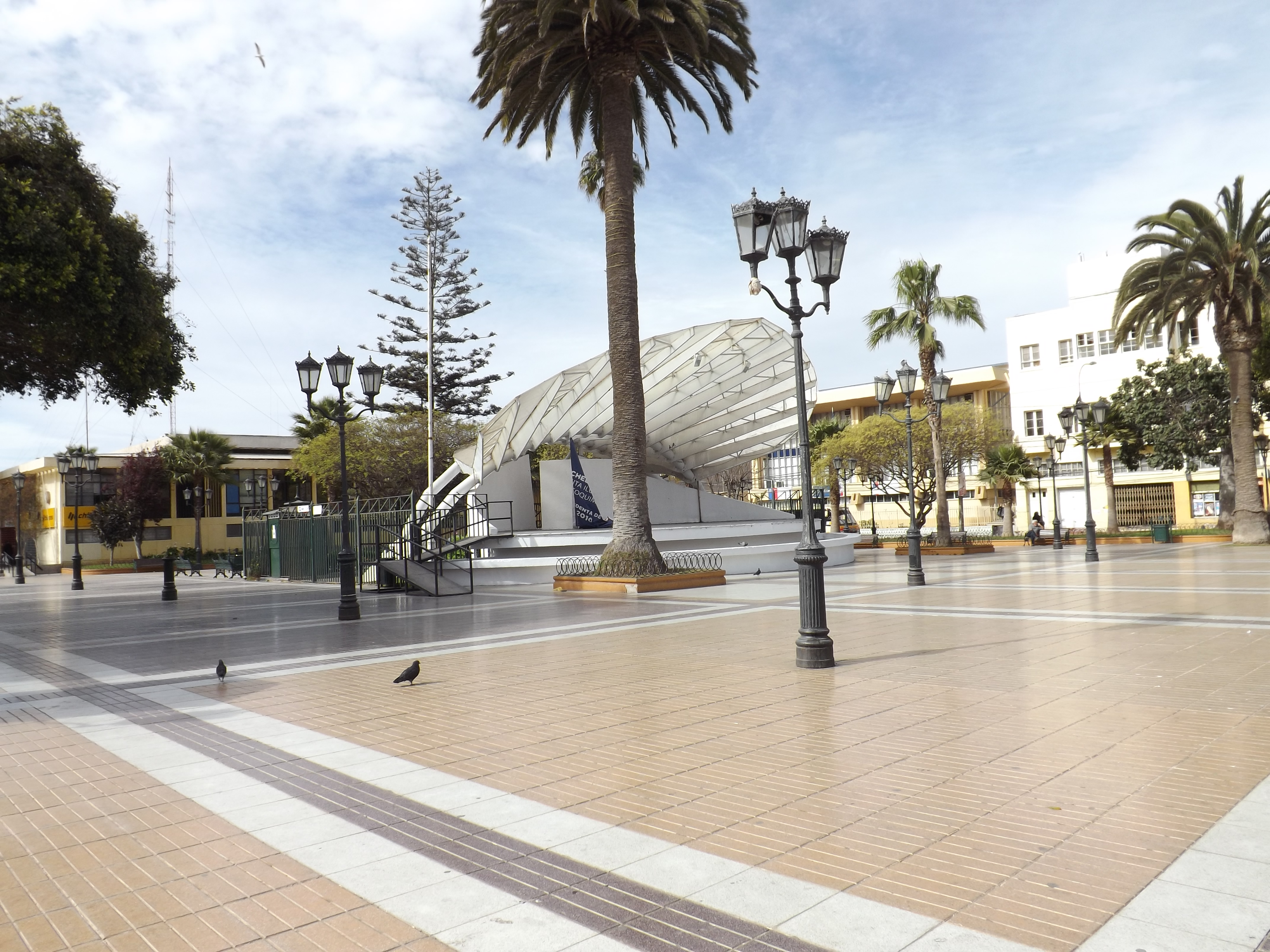
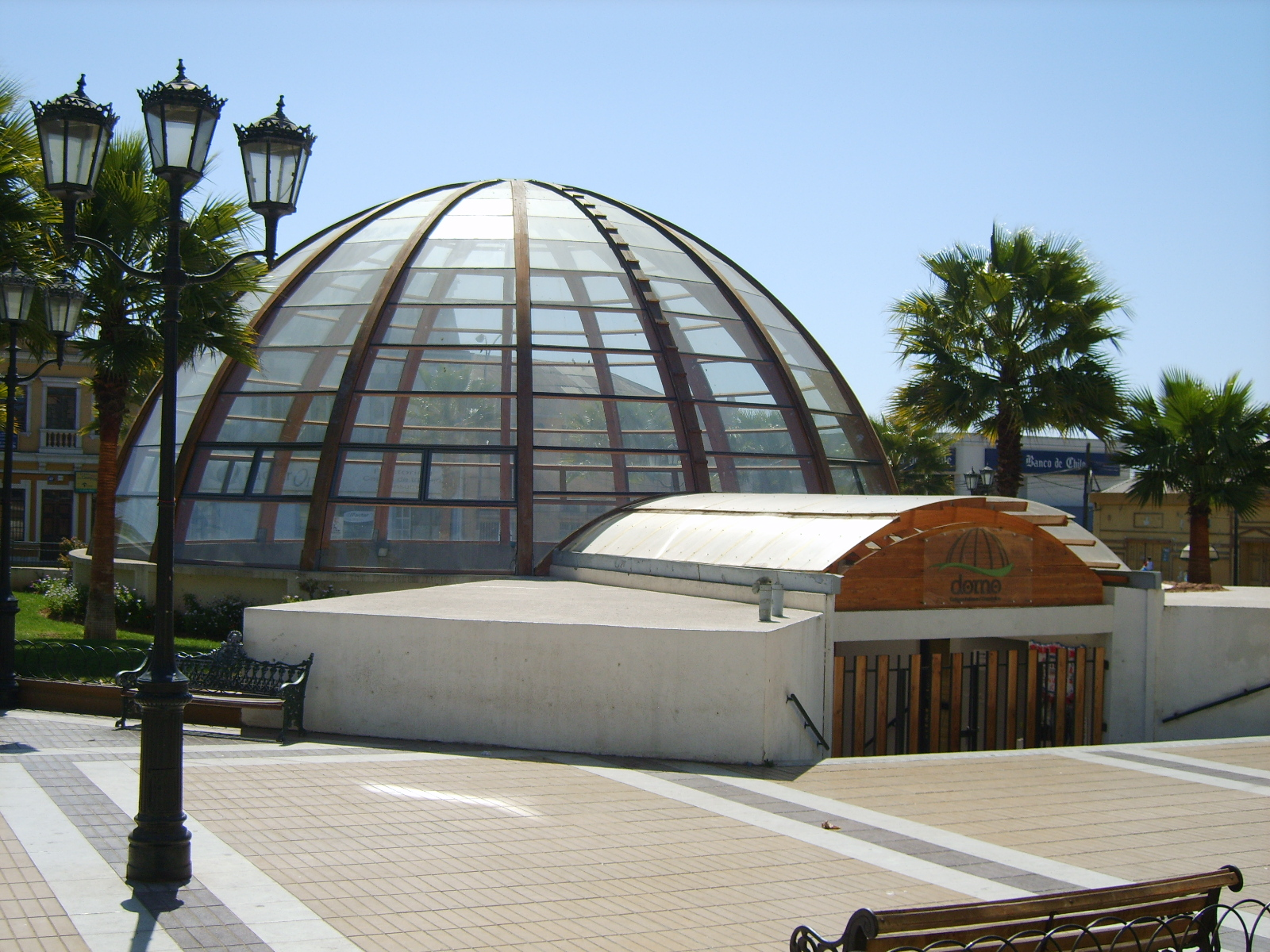

- Flag Coat of arms Location in Chile
- Coordinates (city): 29°57′11″S 71°20′36″W
- Country: Chile
- Region: Coquimbo
- Province: Elqui
- Founded: 1867

Government
  - Type: Municipality
  - Alcalde: Ali Manouchehri

Area
  - Municipality: 1,429.3 km^{2} (551.9 sq mi)
- Elevation: 15 m (49 ft)

Population (2024)
  - Municipality: 263,719
  - Rank: 12th in Chile; 4th (Agglomeration)
  - Density: 184.51/km^{2} (477.88/sq mi)
  - Urban: 448,784
  - Metro: 513,000
- Demonym: Coquimban
- Time zone: UTC−3 (CLT)
- Postal code: 1780000
- Area code: 56 + 51
- Website: municoquimbo.cl

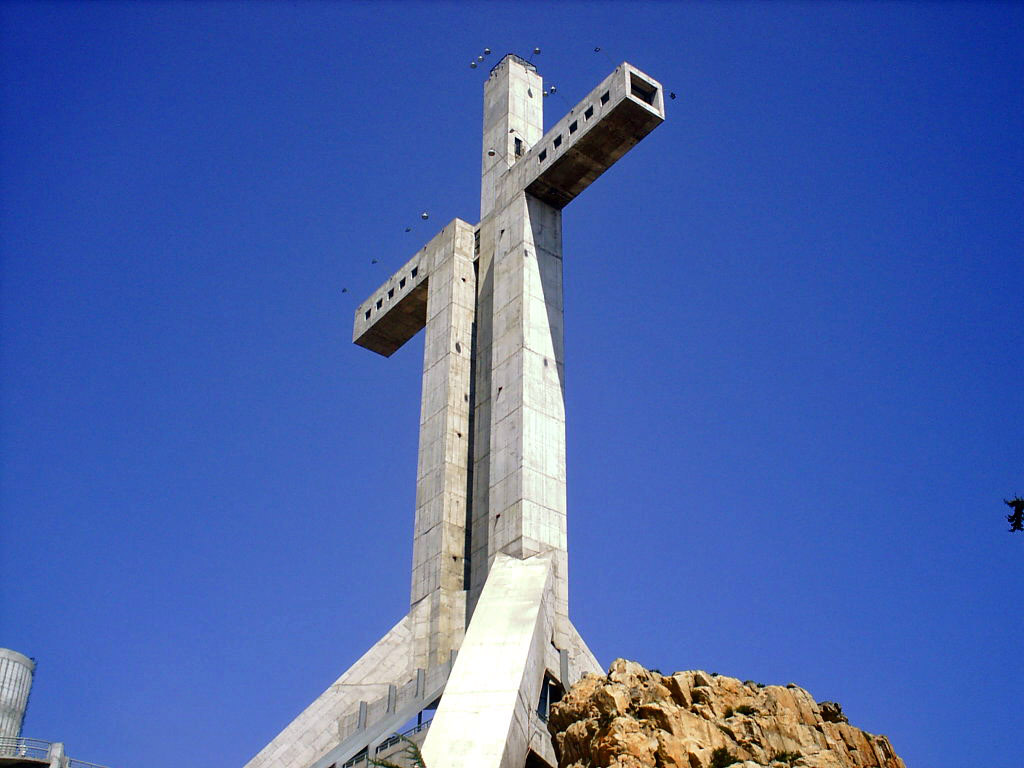
Cruz del Tercer Milenio in Coquimbo.

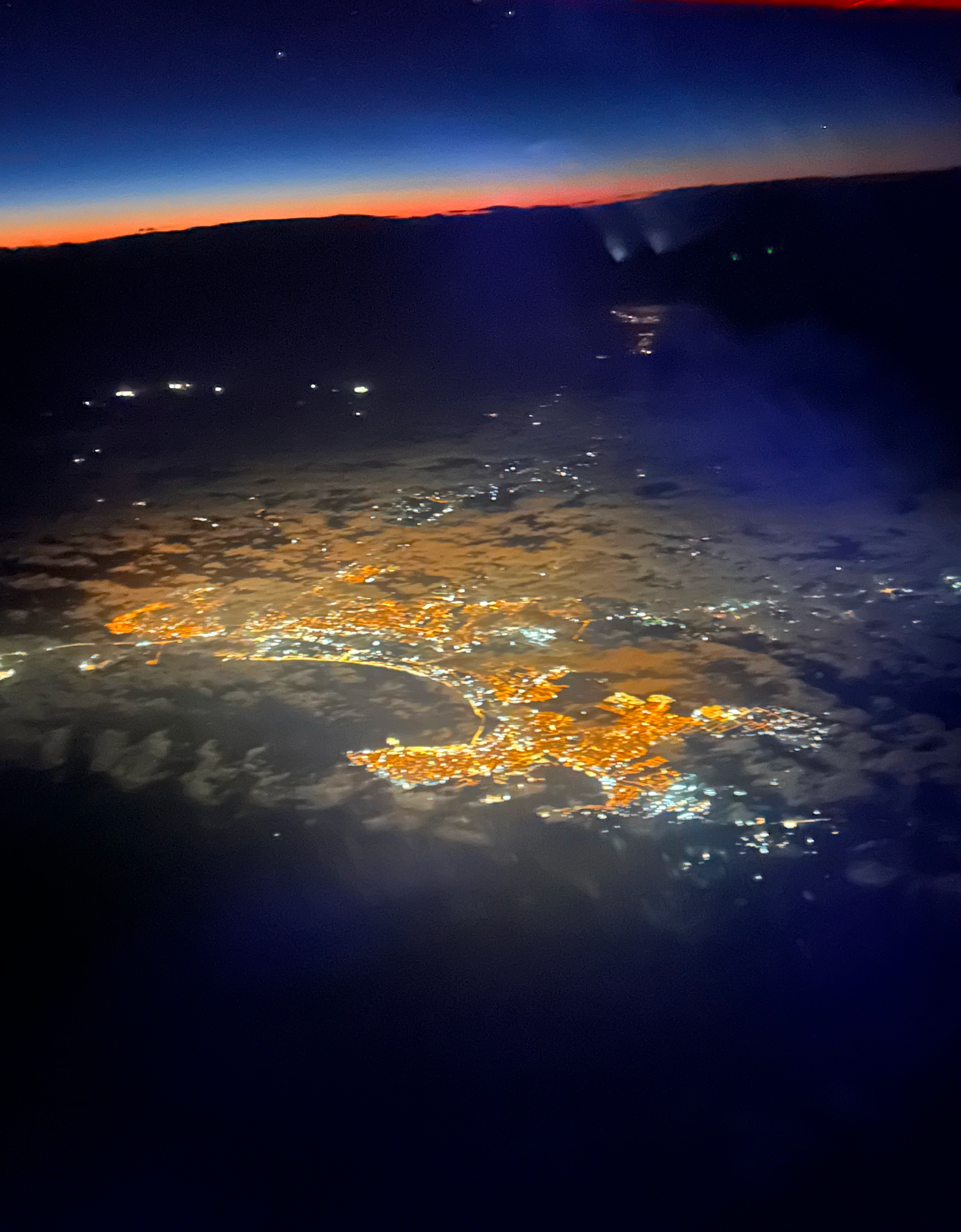
Aerial view of Coquimbo at night

Coquimbo [koˈkimbo] is a port city, commune and capital of the Elqui Province, located on the Pan-American Highway, in the Coquimbo Region in Chile. Coquimbo is situated in a valley 10 km (6 mi) south of La Serena, with which it forms Greater La Serena with more than 400,000 inhabitants. With a population of 263,719, it is the 12th most populous commune in the country.

The commune spans an area around the harbor of 1,429.3 km^{2} (552 sq mi). The average temperature in the city lies around 14 °C (57 °F), and precipitation is low.

== History ==
The area was originally occupied by indigenous people, who used it as a settlement and for fishing purposes. The natural harbor in Coquimbo was taken over by Pedro de Valdivia from Spain in 1550. In 1879 it was recognized as a town. Fort Lambert was built in Coquimbo during the War of the Pacific.

The city was on the main path of totality of the Solar eclipse of July 2, 2019.

=== English settlement ===
Coquimbo was first mentioned in the English speaking world when Charles Darwin visited during his voyage on HMS Beagle, stopping in the town on 14 May 1835 describing the town as "remarkable for nothing but its extreme quietness." Starting in the mid 1800s tens of thousands of Englishmen moved to Coquimbo establishing a distinct English architectural and culinary legacy. English settlement was fueled by the gold and copper industry in the region which peaked in 1860, the same time as the construction of a large English cemetery.

== Demographics ==
As of the 2024 census, the population is 263,719, of which 48.5% are males, and 51.5% are females. People under 15 years old make up 19.3% of the population, and people over 65 years old make up 13.1%. 92.9% of the population is urban and 7.1% is rural.

Historical population

Year	Pop.	±% p.a.
1875	11,150	—
1885	14,100	+2.38%
1895	13,416	−0.50%
1907	18,137	+2.54%
1920	19,634	+0.61%
1930	22,646	+1.44%
1940	24,359	+0.73%

Year	Pop.	±% p.a.
1952	32,132	+2.33%
1970	61,423	+3.67%
1982	91,997	+3.42%
1992	122,766	+2.93%
2002	163,036	+2.88%
2017	227,730	+2.25%
2024	263,719	+2.12%

Source: INE, Memoria Chilena

=== Ethnic minorities ===
As of the 2024 census, Indigenous peoples make up 9.1% of the population, and Afro-Chileans make up 0.7%.

=== Religion ===
As of the 2024 census, 72.4% of the population over 15 years old are Christians (58.9% Catholics, 9.5% Evangelicals or Protestants, and 4.0% other branches), 0.1% are Jews, 0.1% are Muslims, 0.1% are Buddhists, 0.02% are Hinduists, 0.3% are adrehents of other religions, and 27.0% are irreligious.

=== Immigration ===
As of the 2024 census, immigrants make up 6.4% of the population – 5.7% are from South America, 0.6% from North America, 0.1% from Europe, 0.04% from Asia, 0.002% from Africa, and 0.003% from Oceania.

== Administration ==
As a commune, Coquimbo is a fourth-level administrative division of Chile administered by a municipal council, headed by an alcalde who is directly elected every four years. The 2012-2016 alcalde was Cristian Galleguillos Vega.

Within the electoral divisions of Chile, Coquimbo is represented in the Chamber of Deputies by Pedro Velásquez (Ind.) and Matías Walker (PDC) as part of the 8th electoral district, (together with Ovalle and Río Hurtado). The commune is represented in the Senate by Gonzalo Uriarte (UDI) and Jorge Pizarro Soto (PDC), as part of the 4th senatorial constituency (Coquimbo Region).

== Economy ==
The city is an industrial and shipping center. It is growing quickly, registering a 32.8% growth rate from 1992 to 2002. Tourism has started to develop. It is an access point for beach towns to the south, such as Guanaqueros and Tongoy. The port is still important for shipping, especially fruit and copper from mines in the region. Wine is also produced in the area.

== Sport ==
The city has a football team called Coquimbo Unido which became the first Chilean Primera División champions from the Coquimbo Region in 2025 and also won the 2026 Supercopa de Chile. Previously, they won the second division five times in 1962, 1977, 2014 Clausura, 2018 and 2021. Their home games are played at the Francisco Sánchez Rumoroso Municipal Stadium, which has a capacity of 17,750 seats. They are nicknamed "Los Piratas", because of the tradition of pirates that arrived to the coasts of Coquimbo. Their biggest rival is Deportes La Serena.

Another football club, Unión Bellavista, took part in the Copa Chile in 2022 and 2023.

Players from clubs from Coquimbo were with the Chile national football team in the two first South American Championships: Ángel Báez and Hernando Salazar from Thunder and Adán Aguirre from Lusitania (1916) as well as Luis García from Thunder (1917).

In tennis, it was played the Challenger Coquimbo in 2022 and 2023 on clay courts.

Surfing is practiced in Totoralillo, a Tahiti style beach in the south of the city.

== International relations ==
=== Twin towns – Sister cities ===
Coquimbo is twinned with:

- Elbląg, Poland

== Gallery ==
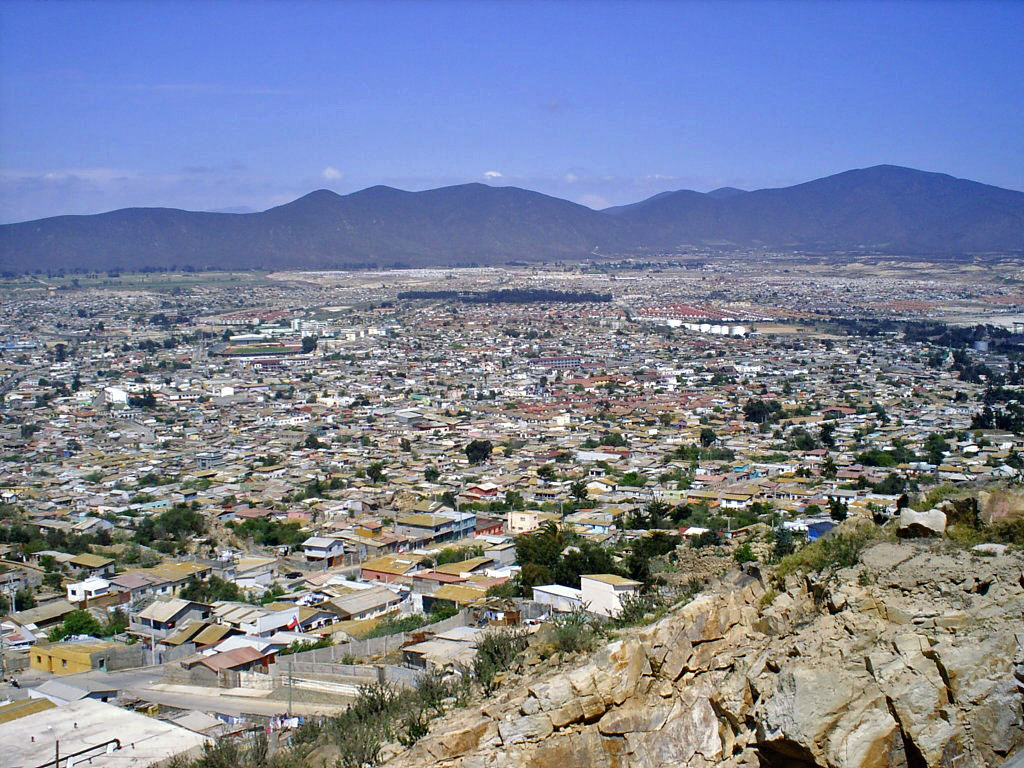
Aerial view

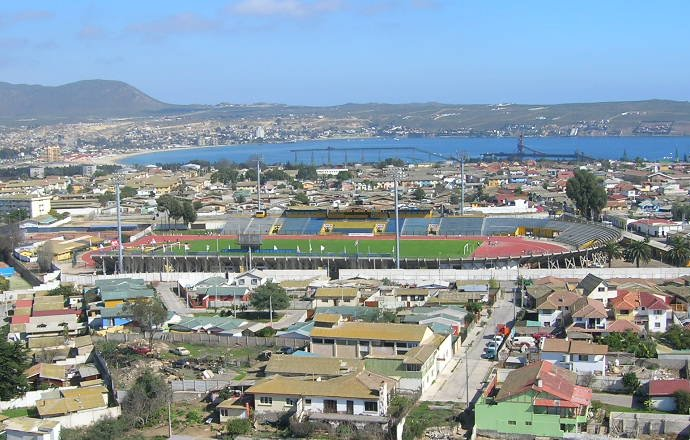
Estadio Municipal Francisco Sánchez Rumoroso

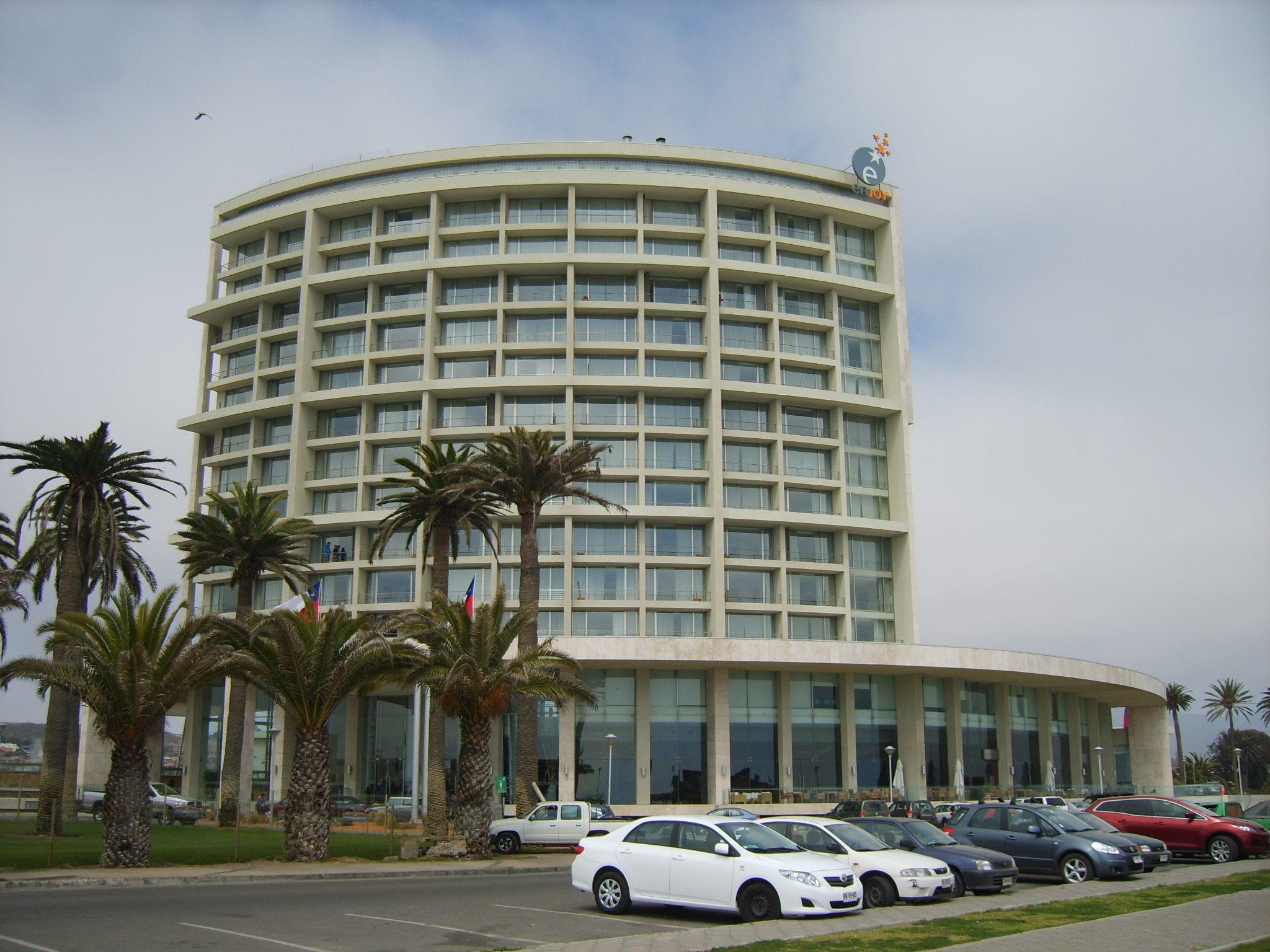
Casino of Coquimbo

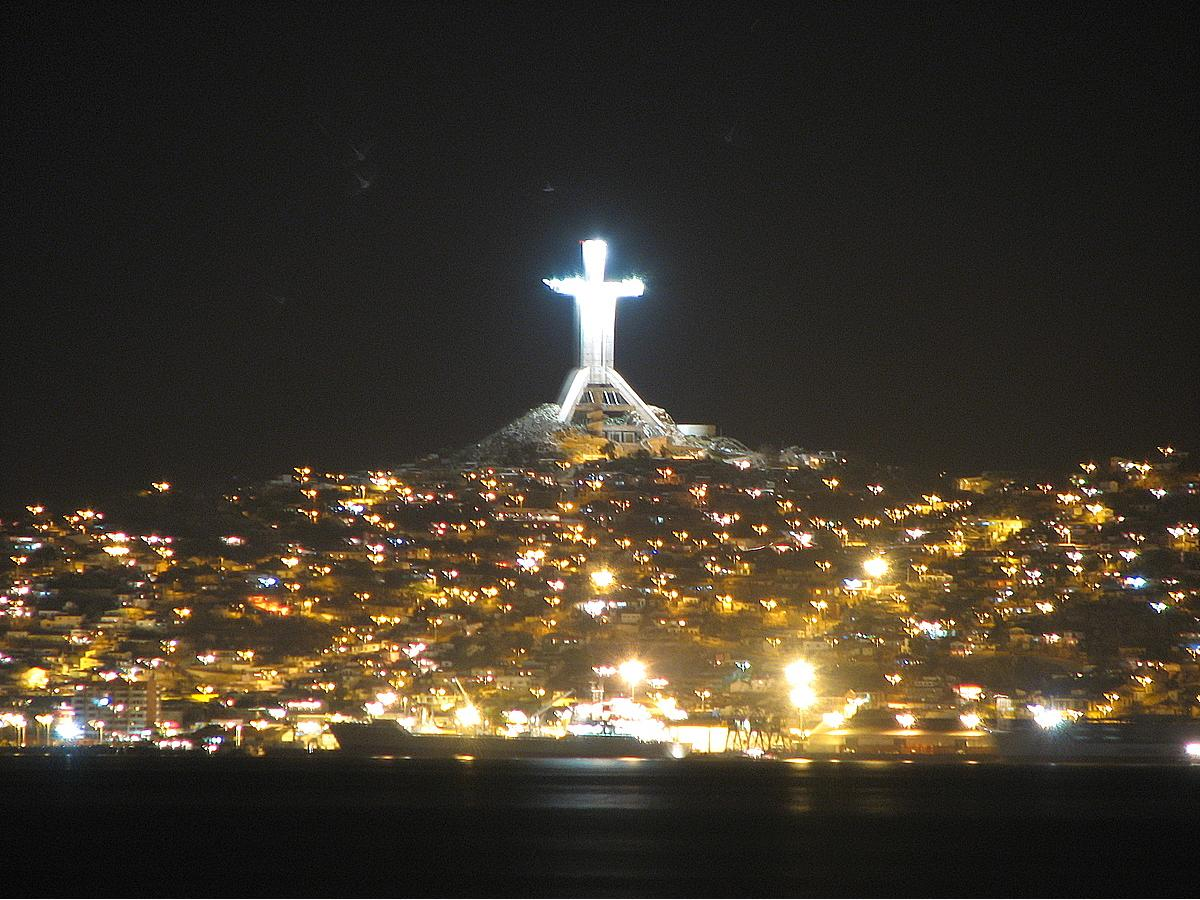
Coquimbo at night

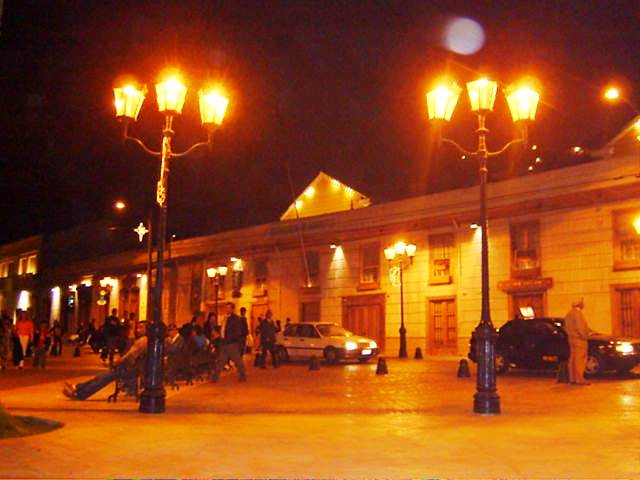
Coquimbo at night

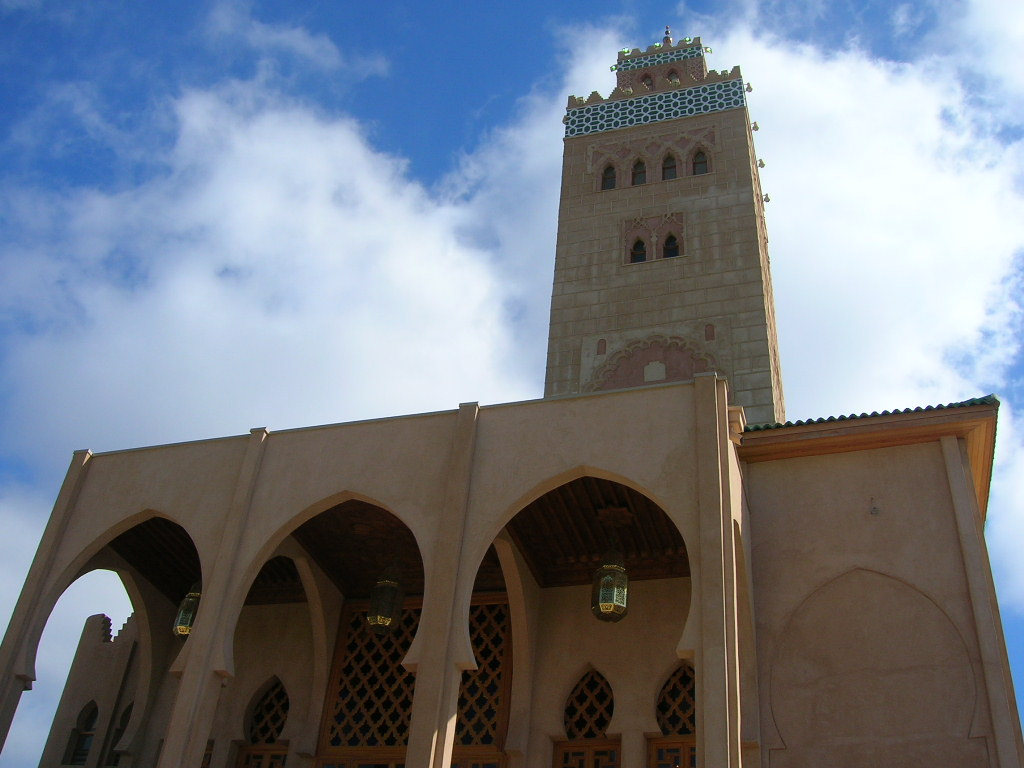
Mohammed VI Mosque

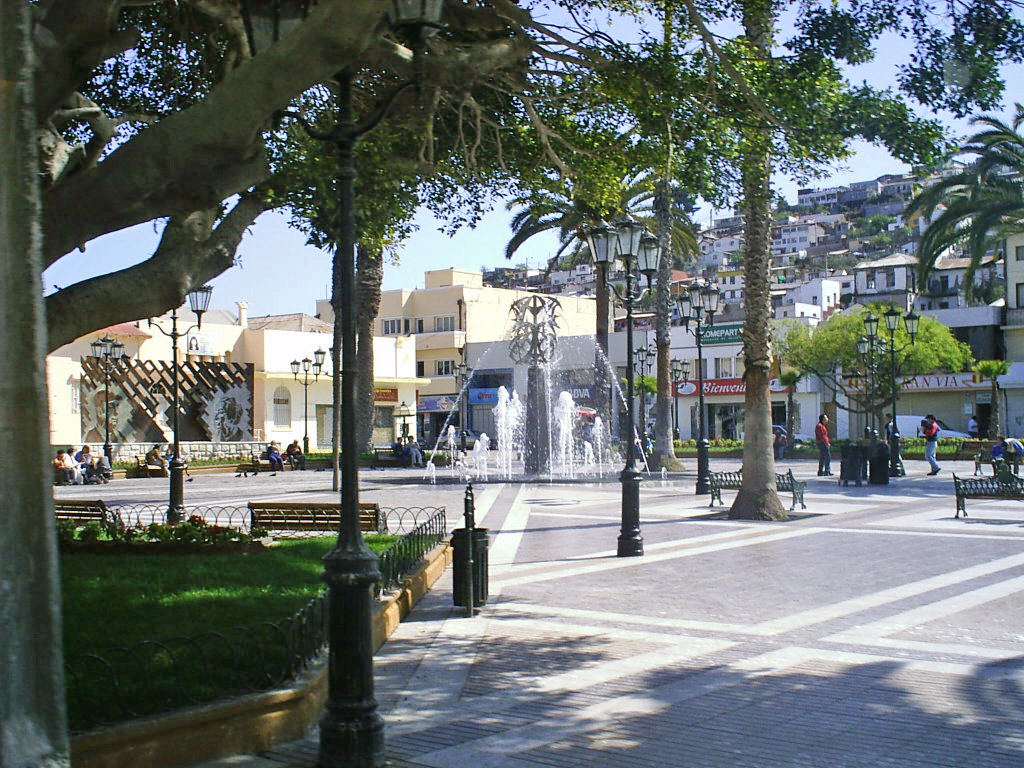
Plaza de Coquimbo

== See also ==
- Asteroid 55737 Coquimbo
- Julio Alberto Mercado Illanes
