= Juan Alvarado =

Juan Alvarado may refer to:

- Juan José Alvarado (1798–1857), Supreme Director of Honduras from 15 April 1839 to 27 April 1839
- Juan Bautista Alvarado (1809–1882), Californio and Governor of Alta California
- Juan Velasco Alvarado (1910–1977), Peruvian general and the 58th President of Peru
- Juan Alvarado (Chilean footballer) (1893–1969), Chilean football midfielder
- Juan Alvarado (Mexican footballer) (born 1948), Mexican football striker
- Juan Carlos Alvarado (singer) (born 1964), Guatemalan Christian singer
- Juan Carlos Alvarado (politician), Venezuelan politician
