= Jorge Pacheco =

Jorge Pacheco may refer to:

- Jorge Pacheco Areco (1920–1998), President of Uruguay
- Jorge Pacheco Klein (born 1954), Uruguayan lawyer and politician, son of the above
- Jorge Pacheco (footballer) (1889-1957), Uruguayan footballer
