= Elordi =

Elordi is a surname of Basque origin. Notable people with the surname include:

- Alejandro Elordi (born 1894), Argentine footballer
- Jacob Elordi (born 1997), Australian actor
- Aitor Elordi (born 1996), Spanish pelota player
