= List of Brazil international footballers born outside Brazil =

This is a list of football players who have represented the Brazil national football team in international football since 1914 and were born outside Brazil.

== List of Players ==
The following players:

1. have played at least one A-class match (against a national team) for the full (senior male) Brazil national team since 1914; and
2. were born outside Brazil.

This list includes players who have dual citizenship with Brazil and/or have become naturalised Brazilian citizens. The players are ordered per modern-day country of birth.

List of players
Country of birth	Player	Caps	Goals	Period
Argentina	Adolpho Milman "Russo"	1	0	1942
Belgium	Andreas Pereira	1	0	2018
England	Sidney Pullen	3	0	1916–1917
Portugal	Casemiro do Amaral	6	0	1916–1917

== In unofficial matches ==
- (England) Sidney Pullen (2 caps, no goal, 1917)
- (Italy) Francisco Police (1 cap, no goal, 1918)

== See also ==
- List of Brazil international footballers
