= Osny (footballer) =

Brazilian footballer (1898–1971)

Osny Augusto Werner
Personal information
- Full name: Osny Augusto Werner
- Date of birth: 10 November 1898
- Place of birth: Rio de Janeiro, Brazil
- Date of death: 14 May 1971 (aged 72)
- Place of death: Rio de Janeiro, Brazil
- Position: Defender

Senior career*
Years	Team	Apps	(Gls)
1916–1917	Botafogo		

International career
1916–1917	Brazil	1	(0)
Medal record
Men's football
Representing Brazil
Copa América
Third place	1916 Argentina
Third place	1917 Uruguay
- * Club domestic league appearances and goals

Osny Augusto Werner (11 October 1898 - 14 May 1971), commonly known as Osny, was a Brazilian footballer who played as a defender. He was a member of the Brazilian squad at the 1916 and 1917 Copa America playing alongside Arthur Friedenreich, Amílcar Barbuy, and Casemiro. Osny, a Botafogo player, was one of the most cult and iconic figures in the early days of the Brazilian football. After retiring from football he started a new career as a referee.

== The blanket centaur ==
Osny was known for his quirky style as he wore eyeglasses, a cap and had a towel wrapped around his neck during the games. He inevitably caught the attention of the crowd in Botafogo's away games. Famous Brazilian writer Nelson Rodrigues once described him as the blanket centaur, a phrase that ever since became Osny's nickname.
