= Gerónimo Badaracco =

Argentine footballer

Personal information
- Full name: Gerónimo Badaracco
- Position: Midfielder

Senior career*
Years	Team	Apps	(Gls)
1912–1914	Argentino de Quilmes		
1915–1919	San Isidro		

International career
1912–1918	Argentina	18	(0)
Medal record
Men's football
Representing Argentina
South American Championship
Runner-up	1916 Argentina
- * Club domestic league appearances and goals

Gerónimo Badaracco was an Argentine footballer who played as a midfielder.

He was part of Argentina's squad for the 1916 South American Championship.

Badaracco played a total of 18 international matches for Argentina.
