= Miguel Benincasa =

Uruguayan footballer

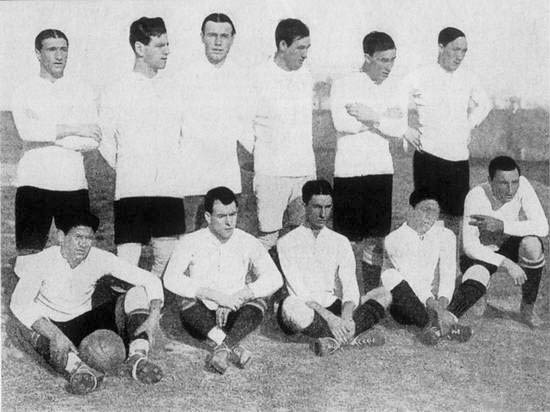

Personal information
- Date of birth: 30 November 1888

International career
Years	Team	Apps	(Gls)
1914–1916	Uruguay	3	(0)
Medal record
Men's football
Representing Uruguay
South American Championship
Winner	1916 Argentina
Winner	1917 Uruguay

Miguel Benincasa (born 30 November 1888, date of death unknown) was a Uruguayan footballer. He played in three matches for the Uruguay national football team from 1914 to 1916. He was also part of Uruguay's squad for the 1916 and 1917.

== Honours ==
Uruguay

- Copa América: 1916, 1917
