= Telésforo Báez =

Chilean footballer (1897–1946)

Personal information
- Full name: Telésforo Segundo Báez Astudillo
- Date of birth: 16 August 1897
- Place of birth: Valparaíso, Chile
- Date of death: 3 March 1946 (aged 48)
- Place of death: Valparaíso, Chile
- Position: Forward

Senior career*
Years	Team	Apps	(Gls)
–1915	Santiago Wanderers II		
1915–1916	Limache National		
1916–1920	Santiago Wanderers		

International career
1919	Chile	2	(0)
- * Club domestic league appearances and goals

Telésforo Segundo Báez Astudillo (16 August 1897 – 3 March 1946) was a Chilean footballer who played as a forward.

== Career ==
Born in Valparaíso, Báez stood out as a player of Santiago Wanderers in the 1910s.

As a player of the second team, Santiago Wanderers II, he was suspended by both the club and the football league of Valparaíso in 1916 as he refused to play an official match against club La Cruz II in October 1915, switching to club Limache National with no licence. He went on playing for Limache National with no licence in 1916 despite belonging to Santiago Wanderers, he was finally suspended for three years.

At international level, Báez made two appearances for the Chile national team in the 1919 South American Championship. He entered in the 0–6 loss against Brazil and the 0–2 loss against Uruguay.

=== Controversy about Ángel Báez ===
Telésforo is frequently and wrongly listed in the Chile squad at the 1916 South American Championship and, consequently, named as the scorer of the first goal for Chile in the history of the South American Championship/Copa América. Ángel Báez, a player from club Thunder from Coquimbo, was really the player in the 1916 squad. Telésforo was probably confused with Ángel by the journals of Valparaíso at the time, according to the research of ASIFUCH, the association of Chilean football researchers. In addition, Telésforo was suspended for three years between 1916 and 1918.

== Personal life ==
His younger brother, Guillermo, was also a footballer who played for Santiago Wanderers, Unión Española, among others clubs.
