= Antonio Ferro (footballer) =

Argentine footballer

Personal information
- Date of birth: 17 March 1896
- Position: Defender

International career
Years	Team	Apps	(Gls)
1917–1918	Argentina	8	(0)

Antonio Ferro (born 17 March 1896, date of death unknown) was an Argentine footballer. He played in eight matches for the Argentina national football team in 1917 and 1918. He was also part of Argentina's squad for the 1917 South American Championship.
