= Adolfo Heisinger =

Argentine footballer

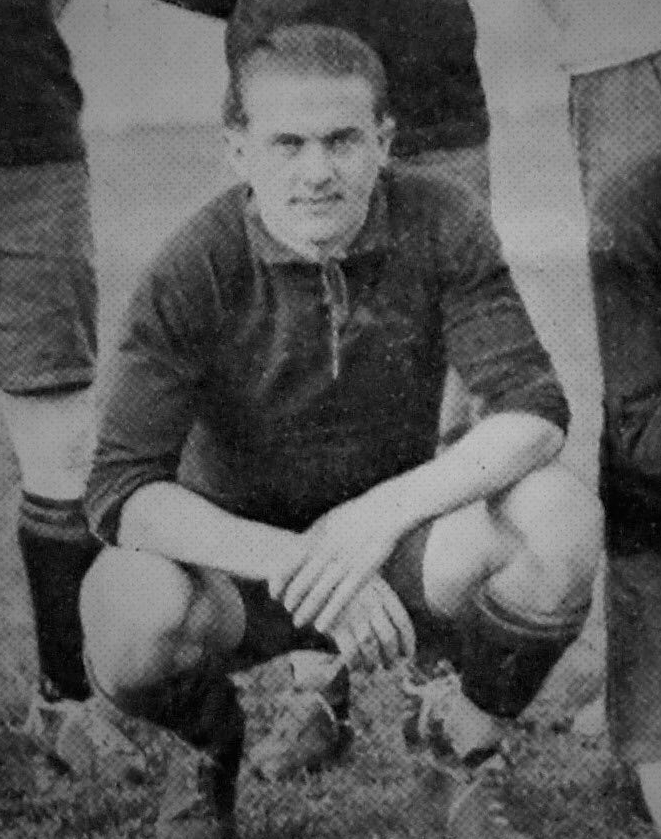

Personal information
- Date of birth: 30 May 1898
- Place of birth: Tigre
- Date of death: 31 October 1976 (aged 78)
- Place of death: Tigre
- Position: Forward

Senior career*
Years	Team	Apps	(Gls)
1914–1929	Tigre		

International career
1916–1922	Argentina	6	(1)
Medal record
Men's football
Representing Argentina
South American Championship
Runner-up	1916 Argentina
- * Club domestic league appearances and goals

Adolfo Guillermo Heisinger (30 May 1898 – 31 October 1976) was an Argentine footballer.

== Club career ==
Adolfo Guillermo played for Club Atlético Tigre during the amateur era, debuting in the first team at 16 in 1914. He played only for Tigre, appearing in 346 matches between 1914 and 1929 and scoring 47 goals.

== International career ==
He played six matches for the Argentina national football team from 1916 to 1922, scoring one goal. He was also part of Argentina's 1916 South American Championship squad.

== Style of play ==
Playing as a right forward, he was later described by Tigre journalists as having a robust build, he was also described by journalists as fast and skillful, delivering precise crosses to his attacking teammates.

== Personal life ==
Guillermo was born in Tigre, Buenos Aires, on 30 May 1898. He alternated football and rowing, participating in numerous regattas. Once retired, he remained close to Club Atlético Tigre, attending all its matches. He died on 31 October 1976, in Tigre.
