= Julián Bértola =

Uruguayan footballer and manager

Personal information
- Full name: Julián Bértola Alareo
- Date of birth: 25 February 1895
- Place of birth: Montevideo, Uruguay
- Place of death: Uruguay
- Position: Right-half

Youth career
- 1910: Nacional Juniors
- 1911–1913: Nacional 3^{er} Team

Senior career*
Years	Team	Apps	(Gls)
1913–1914	Nacional	6	(0)
1915	Independencia		
1916	Nacional	3	(0)
1917	Grêmio		
1917–1919	Nacional	9	(0)
1920	Dublin		
1921	Nacional Reserva		

International career
1916	Uruguay	1	(0)

Managerial career
- 1917: Nacional
- 1917: Chile
- 1917–1918: Uruguay
- * Club domestic league appearances and goals

Julián Bértola Alareo (25 February 1895 – unknown) was an Uruguayan football player and manager who played as a right-half.

== Playing career ==
=== Club ===
A right-half, an older version of a right midfielder, Bértola was a product of Nacional youth system, making his senior debut in a 1–0 win versus River Plate Football Club on 2 May 1913. He made a total of 18 appearances for the club during three steps: 1913–1914, 1916, 1917–1919. Along with Nacional, he got the 1917 Campeonato Uruguayo, making 3 appearances in the championship. In Uruguay, he also played for both Independencia and Dublin Football Club as well as for the Nacional Reserves.

In 1917, Bértola joined Brazilian side Grêmio. After his retirement, he worked as Consul of the club in Montevideo.

=== International ===
In September 1916, Bértola took part in a 1–2 loss of the Uruguay national team versus Grêmio in Porto Alegre, Brazil

== Coaching career ==
At the amateur era, it was normal that the team captains performed as the head coach and/or fitness coach of his teams. So, in 1917, Bértola performed as player, captain, manager and fitness coach of Nacional at the same time.

In the same year, Bértola and his teammates took part of the training sessions of both the Chile and the Brazil national teams at the Estadio Parque Central before the 1917 South American Championship. On 30 September 1917, he officially assumed as the Chile national team coach for the championship, where Chile loss all the matches: 0-4 versus Uruguay, 0-1 versus Argentina, 0-5 versus Brazil.

In the same year, Bértola coached the Uruguay national team.

== Personal life ==
At the same time he was a football player and coach, he performed as a PE Teacher.

== Honours ==
Nacional

- Campeonato Uruguayo (1): 1917 (Note: player and coach)
- Copa de Honor (2): 1914, 1917
- Copa Competencia (3): 1913, 1914, 1919
