= José Durand Laguna =

Argentine footballer and manager

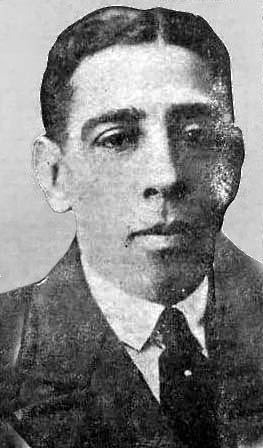

Personal information
- Full name: José Manuel Durand Laguna
- Date of birth: November 7, 1885
- Place of birth: Buenos Aires, Argentina
- Date of death: February 1, 1965 (age 79)
- Place of death: Asunción, Paraguay
- Height: 1.69 m (5 ft 7 in)
- Position: Winger

Youth career
- Gloria de Mayo

Senior career*
Years	Team	Apps	(Gls)
1911	Nacional de Floresta		
1912	Independiente		
1913	Libertarios Unidos		
1914–1919	Huracán		
1920	Olimpia		
1920–1922	Huracán		
1923	AA Bahia		
1924	Huracán		
1926–1927	Olimpia		

International career
1916–1919	Argentina	4	(3)

Managerial career
- 1921: Paraguay
- 1926–1927: Olimpia
- 1928–1929: Huracán
- 1930: Paraguay
- 1930–1934: Huracán
- 1942: Club Nacional
- 1942: Lanús
- 1943: Huracán
- 1943: Gimnasia
- 1944–1945: Club Nacional
- 1945: Paraguay
Medal record
Men's football
Representing Argentina (as player)
South American Championship
Runner-up	1916 Argentina
Representing Paraguay (as manager)
South American Championship
Runner-up	1929 Argentina
- * Club domestic league appearances and goals

José Manuel Durand Laguna (November 7, 1885 – February 1, 1965) was an Argentine football player and manager.

Laguna was born in Salta, Argentina, and died, aged 79, in Asunción, Paraguay.

== Club career ==
He grew up in Cachi and, at the age of sixteen, moved to Buenos Aires with his family, where he began playing for the club Gloria de Mayo. In 1907, he relocated to Parque Patricios, where he began his journey with what would later become Huracán. He served as the club's president until May 25, 1911, during which he was instrumental to several milestones, such as establishing that the team's jersey should be white with Huracán's iconic balloon emblem.

Before playing for Huracán's senior team, he also played for Nacional de Floresta, Independiente, and Libertarios Unidos. As a forward, Durán Laguna played 113 matches for Huracán, scoring 59 goals in league play, along with appearances in Copa de Competencia Jockey Club (11 matches, 4 goals) and Copa de Honor Municipalidad de Buenos Aires (12 matches, 9 goals). Between 1914 and 1924, he played a total of 137 games and scored 71 goals.

== International career ==
While representing Huracán, he was also part of the Argentina national football team between 1916 and 1919, scoring three goals in four appearances. His debut for the national team was a matter of chance: he wasn't initially on the squad, but when a starting player was unavailable during the 1916 South American Championship, officials found Durand Laguna in the stands and brought him in.

== Managerial career ==
Durand Laguna was the manager of the Paraguay national team at the 1921 and 1929 South American Championship and at the 1930 FIFA World Cup. He also managed several clubs in Argentina and Paraguay, including Olimpia, Huracán, Club Nacional, Lanús, and Gimnasia.

== Honours ==
=== Player ===
Huracán

- Argentine Primera División: 1921, 1922
- Copa Ibarguren: 1922
