= Guillermo Báez =

Chilean footballer

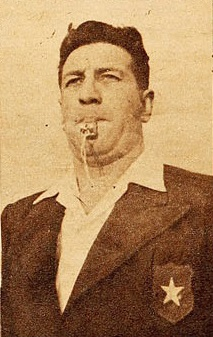
- Báez as referee in 1946

Personal information
- Full name: Guillermo Osvaldo Báez Astudillo
- Date of birth: 1909
- Place of birth: Valparaíso, Chile
- Position: Defender

Youth career
- Santiago Wanderers

Senior career*
Years	Team	Apps	(Gls)
1924–1926	Santiago Wanderers		
1927–1929	Unión Deportiva Española		
1930	Everton		
1931	Juventud Asturiana		
1932–1935	Sportiva Italiana		
1936–1937	Santiago Wanderers		
1937–1938	Unión Española		
1939–1943	Green Cross		

Managerial career
- 1949–1950: San Luis
- 1958: Ñublense
- 1959: Rangers
- 1964: Lister Rossel
- 1971: Naval
- 1975–1976: Deportes Concepción
- 1980: Curicó Unido
- * Club domestic league appearances and goals

Guillermo Osvaldo Báez Astudillo (1909 – unknown) was a Chilean football manager and player who played as a defender.

== Playing career ==
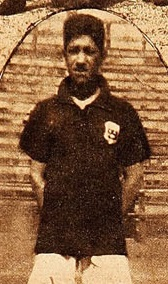
Báez with Santiago Wanderers.

Born in Valparaíso, Báez stood out as a player of Santiago Wanderers in the 1920s and 1930s.

Before the professional era in Chilean football, he also played for Unión Deportiva Española, Everton and Sportiva Italiana. Abroad, he played for Juventud Asturiana in Cuba.

In the Chilean Primera División, he played for Santiago Wanderers, Unión Española and Green Cross.

== Post-retirement ==
=== As referee ===
Following his retirement, he performed as a football referee in the Chilean football.

=== As coach ===
As a football coach, he led many clubs in the Chilean football. A year before Ñublense joined the professional football, he led them in the 1958 regional championship of Concepción.

In the Chilean Segunda División, he coached clubs such as Lister Rossel, becoming the runner-up in 1964 and Naval de Talcahuano, winning the 1971 league title.

In the Chilean Primera División, he coached clubs such as Rangers and Deportes Concepción, becoming the runner-up in the 1975 season with Vicente Cantatore as assistant.

== Personal life ==
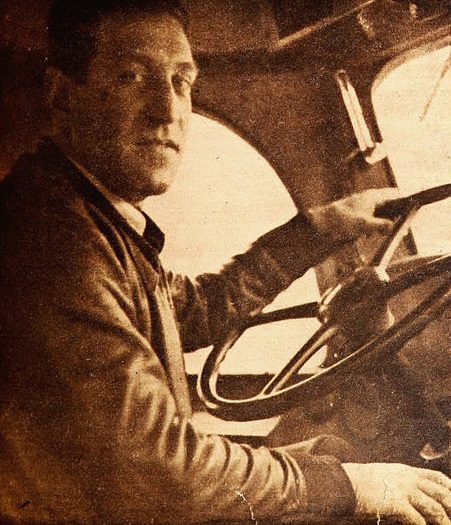
Báez as a bus driver in 1942

His older brother, Telésforo, was also a footballer who represented the Chile national team in the 1919 South American Championship.

He was nicknamed Gallego (Galician).

At the same time he was a player of Green Cross, he worked as a bus driver.

== Honours ==
=== Manager ===
Naval

- Segunda División: 1971
