= Jaime Chavín =

Argentine footballer

Personal information
- Date of birth: 25 July 1899
- Date of death: 20 July 1971 (aged 71)
- Position: Forward

International career
| Years | Team | Apps | (Gls) |
| 1918–1921 | Argentina | 4 | (1) |

Jaime Chavín (25 July 1899 – 20 July 1971) was an Argentine footballer. He played in four matches for the Argentina national football team from 1918 to 1921. He was also part of Argentina's squad for the 1917 South American Championship.
