= Adhemar (footballer, born 1896) =

Brazilian footballer (1896–?)

Personal information
- Full name: Adhemar dos Santos
- Date of birth: 8 November 1896
- Place of birth: Rio de Janeiro, Brazil
- Position: Midfielder

Senior career*
Years	Team	Apps	(Gls)
1915–1920	América		

International career
1917	Brazil	1	(0)
- * Club domestic league appearances and goals

Adhemar dos Santos (born 8 November 1896, date of death unknown), known simply as Adhemar, was a Brazilian footballer who played as a midfielder. He made one appearance for the Brazil national team in 1917. He was also part of Brazil's squad for the 1917 South American Championship.
