= Ángel Báez =

Chilean footballer (1894–1920)

Personal information
- Full name: Ángel Custodio Báez Rivera
- Date of birth: 8 August 1894
- Place of birth: Coquimbo, Chile
- Date of death: 21 September 1920 (aged 26)
- Place of death: Coquimbo, Chile
- Position: Forward

Senior career*
Years	Team	Apps	(Gls)
–1918	Thunder		
1913–1915	Coquimbo (city team)		
1915–1919	Ovalle (city team)		
1919	Arco Iris		

International career
1916	Chile	4	(1)
- * Club domestic league appearances and goals

Ángel Custodio Báez Rivera (8 August 1894 – 21 September 1920) was a Chilean footballer who played as a forward.

== Club career ==
Born in Guayacán town, Coquimbo, Báez stood out as a player of Club Thunder, becoming the team captain in 1915. He represented the Coquimbo city team in intercity matches against La Serena, the adjacent city, winning the silver medal, equivalent to the first place, eleven times in 1913.

In 1917, he was selected Director of club Thunder and awarded as the best player of then Coquimbo Province.

In 1915 and 1919, he also represented the Ovalle city team, a near city to Coquimbo. In the football league of that city, he played for Club Arco Iris in 1919.

== International career ==
Báez made two appearances for the Chile national team in the 1916 South American Championship and scored the goal in the 6–1 loss against Argentina, the first goal for Chile in the history of the South American Championship/Copa América. He made a second appearance in the 1–1 draw against Brazil.

In the same year, he also played in the friendlies against Argentina on 12 July (1–0 loss in Buenos Aires), Uruguay on 14 July (4–1 loss in Montevideo) and the Argentine Federación Platense on 16 July (0–3 win in La Plata).

=== Controversy about Telésforo Báez ===
Despite Ángel Báez played at the 1916 South American Championship and scored the goal against Argentina, Telésforo Báez is frequently and wrongly listed in the squad. In fact, Telésforo, a player of Santiago Wanderers from Valparaíso, was a member of the Chile national team in the 1919 South American Championship, but he was probably confused with Ángel in the 1916 squad by the journals of Valparaíso at the time, according to the research of ASIFUCH, the association of Chilean football researchers. In addition, Telésforo was suspended during 1916 due to an indiscipline act in Octubre 1915.

== Personal life ==
His parents were Carmen Rivera Díaz and Jorge Báez Briones. Ángel worked as a foundry worker for EFE, the state railway company, like his father.

In 1920, Báez returned to Coquimbo from Ovalle due to the fact that he got sick. He died on 20 September of the same year of tuberculosis.
