= Fort Lambert =

Nineteenth century fortification in Chile

- Coquimbo Chile
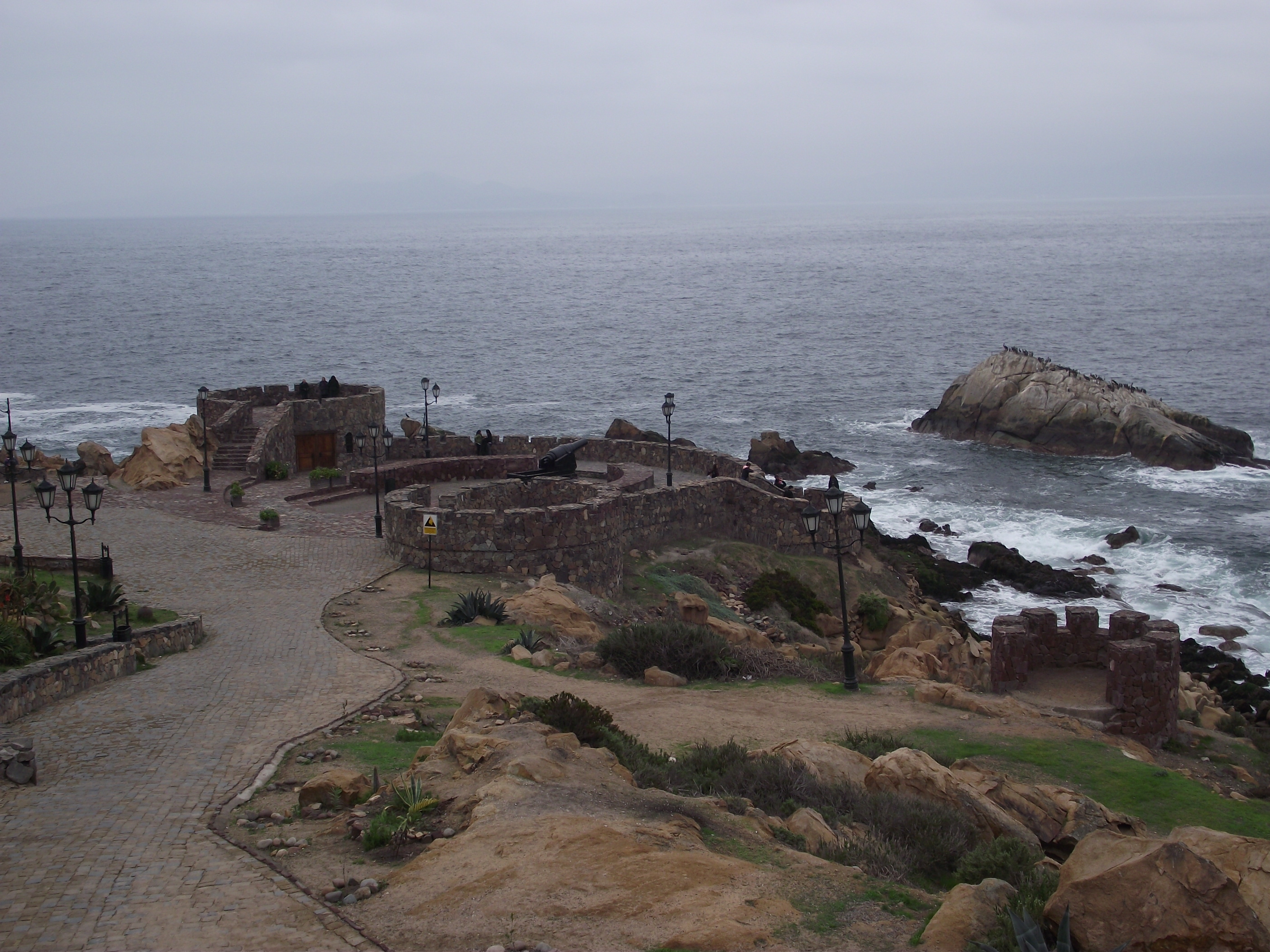
- Fuerte de Nacimiento, viewed from the north-east

Site information
- Type: Fortress
- Open to the public: y
- Condition: restored/rebuilt

Location
- Coordinates: 29°56′02″S 71°20′09″W

Site history
- Built: 1879; 2005 (restoration)

Fort Lambert (also known as Fort Coquimbo) is a nineteenth century fortification sited on the "Castillo del Carmen" hill at the northern end of Coquimbo bay on the eastern side of the peninsular accommodating the old heart of Coquimbo in central Chile. This part of the city is known as "Punta Pelícanos" ("Pelican Promontory") because just off the coast there is a small island inhabited by pelicans.

Fort Lambert no longer has an operational role militarily, but it is a popular tourist destination because of the views it provides across the Bay of Coquimbo.

== History ==
The first fortification on the promontory was constructed in 1865 when two small cannon were set up on the "Castillo del Carmen" hill in order to defend the Bay of Coquimbo during the war with Spain. The cannon were later withdrawn on the orders of the mayor.

A new fortress was constructed in the same place by the entrepreneur Carlos J. Lambert in order to protect the port of Coquimbo from possible attacks by Peruvian ships during the War of the Pacific. A 150-pound muzzle loading cannon from the British Armstrong munitions company was installed on 10 July 1879 by soldiers of the Municipal Artillery Brigade under the command of Engineer Eleazar Lezaeta Acharán on the fortifications constructed by Delmiro Koch.

For more than a century the fort was maintained in its original state, with the cannon positioned at its center, but by 2005 there had nevertheless been significant structural deterioration. In 2003 the municipality launched a rescue plan which involved investing 68 Million Pesos. The structure was both restored and expanded, with the addition of three additional stone-built low lookout towers with lighting and benches. Along the approach road, approximately 100 meters to the south of the fort, a stone entrance portal was also constructed, using local stones, and the access path was paved. The restored Fort Lambert was officially inaugurated in 2005.

Still visible close by are the remains of a building that at one time served as a women's prison, before being converted for use as a school and, more recently, used by the Chilean navy.
