= Paula Ramos =

Brazilian footballer (born 1895)

Personal information
- Full name: José França de Paula Ramos
- Date of birth: 4 June 1895
- Position: Midfielder

International career
Years	Team	Apps	(Gls)
1917	Brazil	1	(0)

José França de Paula Ramos (born 4 June 1895, date of death unknown), known as just Paula Ramos, was a Brazilian footballer who played as a midfielder. He played in one match for the Brazil national football team in 1917. He was also part of Brazil's squad for the 1917 South American Championship.
