= Bartolo Muñoz =

Chilean footballer

Personal information
- Date of birth: 29 March 1892
- Position: Forward

International career
Years	Team	Apps	(Gls)
1917	Chile	4	(1)

Bartolo Muñoz (born 29 March 1892, date of death unknown) was a Chilean footballer. He played in four matches for the Chile national football team in 1917. He was also part of Chile's squad for the 1917 South American Championship.
