= Guillermo Cisternas =

Chilean footballer (1891-1941)

Personal information
- Date of birth: 16 March 1891
- Date of death: 25 January 1941 (aged 49)
- Position: Midfielder

International career
Years	Team	Apps	(Gls)
1917	Chile	2	(0)

Guillermo Cisternas (16 March 1891 – 25 January 1941) was a Chilean footballer. He played in two matches for the Chile national football team in 1917. He was also part of Chile's squad for the 1917 South American Championship.
