= Marcos Wittke =

Chilean footballer (1896–1945)

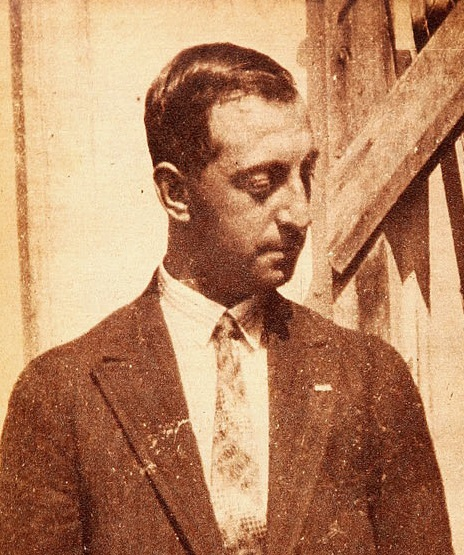

Personal information
- Full name: Marcos Aurelio Wittke Herrera
- Date of birth: 8 October 1896
- Place of birth: Nueva Imperial, Chile
- Date of death: 6 March 1945 (aged 48)
- Position: Defender

International career
| Years | Team | Apps | (Gls) |
| 1916 | Chile | 5 | (0) |

Marcos Wittke (8 October 1896 – 6 March 1945) was a Chilean footballer. He played in five matches for the Chile national football team in 1916. He was also part of Chile's squad for the 1916 South American Championship.
