= Ricardo Naón =

Argentine footballer

Personal information
- Full name: Ricardo Naón
- Position: Midfielder

Senior career*
Years	Team	Apps	(Gls)
1914	Estudiantes de La Plata		

International career
1914	Argentina	2	(0)
Medal record
Men's football
Representing Argentina
South American Championship
Runner-up	1916 Argentina
- * Club domestic league appearances and goals

Ricardo Naón was an Argentine footballer who played as a midfielder.

He was part of Argentina's squad for the 1916 South American Championship, but did not play any game during the tournament.

Badaracco played two international matches for Argentina.
