= Juan Cilley =

Argentine footballer

Personal information
- Date of birth: 22 February 1898
- Date of death: 25 February 1954 (aged 56)
- Position: Midfielder

International career
Years	Team	Apps	(Gls)
1919	Argentina	1	(0)

Juan Cilley (22 February 1898 – 25 February 1954) was an Argentine footballer. He played in one match for the Argentina national football team in 1919. He was also part of Argentina's squad for the 1919 South American Championship.
