= Alencar (footballer, born 1892) =

Brazilian footballer

Manoel Alencar do Monte
Personal information
- Date of birth: 6 September 1892
- Place of birth: São Paulo, Brazil
- Position: Inside left

Senior career*
| Years | Team | Apps | (Gls) |
| 1907–1913 | Americano | | |
| 1913–1914 | Ypiranga | | |
| 1915 | Mackenzie | | |
| 1915–1916 | Americano | | |
| 1917–1919 | São Bento | | |

International career
| 1916 | Brazil | 4 | (1) |
Medal record
Men's football
Representing Brazil
South American Championship
| Third place | 1916 Argentina |
- * Club domestic league appearances and goals

Manoel Alencar do Monte (born 6 September 1892, date of death unknown), known as Alencar, was a Brazilian footballer who played as a forward. He played in four matches for the Brazil national football team in 1916. He was also part of Brazil's squad for the 1916 South American Championship.
