= Alvaro Martins (footballer) =

Brazilian footballer

Personal information
- Date of birth: 30 August 1901
- Position: Midfielder

International career
Years	Team	Apps	(Gls)
1919–1920	Brazil	4	(0)

Alvaro Martins (born 30 August 1901, date of death unknown) was a Brazilian footballer who played a midfielder. He played in four matches for the Brazil national football team in 1919 and 1920. He was also part of Brazil's squad for the 1919 South American Championship.
