= Antonio Cortella =

Argentine footballer

Personal information
- Date of birth: 11 October 1896
- Date of death: 20 May 1962 (aged 65)
- Position: Midfielder

International career
Years	Team	Apps	(Gls)
1918–1922	Argentina	13	(0)

Antonio Cortella (11 October 1896 – 20 May 1962) was an Argentine footballer. He played in 13 matches for the Argentina national football team from 1918 to 1922. He was also part of Argentina's squad for the 1919 South American Championship.
