= Palamone =

Brazilian footballer (1898–?)

Personal information
- Full name: Luiz Bento Palamone
- Date of birth: 21 March 1898
- Place of birth: Araraquara, Brazil
- Date of death: 22 October 1970
- Position: Defender

Senior career*
| Years | Team | Apps | (Gls) |
| 1919–1925 | Botafogo | | |

International career
| 1919–1922 | Brazil | 7 | (0) |
- * Club domestic league appearances and goals

Luiz Bento Palamone (21 March 1898 – 22 October 1970) was a Brazilian footballer who played as a defender. He made seven appearances for the Brazil national team from 1919 to 1922. He was also part of Brazil's squad for the 1919 South American Championship.
