= Associação Atlética da Bahia =

Brazilian professional multi-sport club

Atlética da Bahia
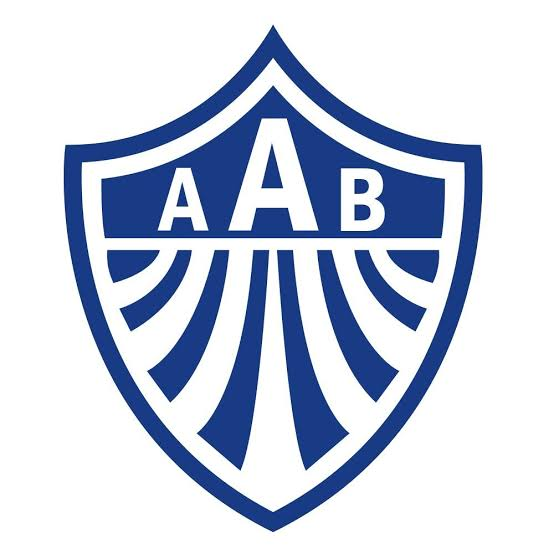
- Full name: Associação Atlética da Bahia
- Founded: 4 October 1914; 111 years ago
- Stadium: Campo da Graça
- Capacity: 3,000

The Associação Atlética da Bahia (AAB) is a Brazilian multi-sport club in the city of Salvador, capital of the state of Bahia. It was state champion in men's football and is one of the traditional clubs in Bahia's tennis competitions.

It was founded on October 4, 1914, on Avenida Sete de Setembro, then Rua São Pedro, in the center of Salvador. That same year, the Yankee Foot-Ball Club and several other football clubs were also founded in the city as a result of a match played at Campo da Pólvora between Esporte Clube Ypiranga and a team from the Brazilian Navy training ship Benjamim Constant. Although the main focus was on football, from the beginning it was established as a sports club for various sports.

In men's football, AAB was champion of the Campeonato Baiano in 1924 and the Torneio Início da Bahia in 1928. He was also runner-up in Bahia four times (1921, 1922, 1923 and 1925). However, in 1930 its football department closed. The same had happened with Bahiano de Tênis and footballers previously linked to both gave rise to Esporte Clube Bahia the following year.

== Honours ==
- Campeonato Baiano
  - Winners (1): 1924
  - Runners-up (4): 1921, 1922, 1923, 1925
- Torneio Início da Bahia
  - Winners (1): 1928
