= Juan Delgado (Uruguayan footballer) =

Uruguayan footballer

Personal information
- Date of birth: 26 February 1891
- Position: Midfielder

Senior career*
Years	Team	Apps	(Gls)
1914	Boca Juniors		
1916	Central Montevideo		
1917-1921	Peñarol		

International career
1913–1920	Uruguay	15	(0)
Medal record
Men's football
Representing Uruguay
South American Championship
Winner	1916 Argentina
Runner-up	1919 Brazil
- * Club domestic league appearances and goals

Juan Delgado (born 26 February 1891, date of death unknown) was a Uruguayan footballer. He played in 15 matches for the Uruguay national football team from 1913 to 1920. He was also part of Uruguay's squad for the 1916 and the 1919 South American Championship.

== Honours ==
Peñarol

- Primera División: 1918, 1921

Uruguay

- Copa America: 1916
