= Ramón Unzaga =

Spanish-born Chilean footballer (1892–1923)

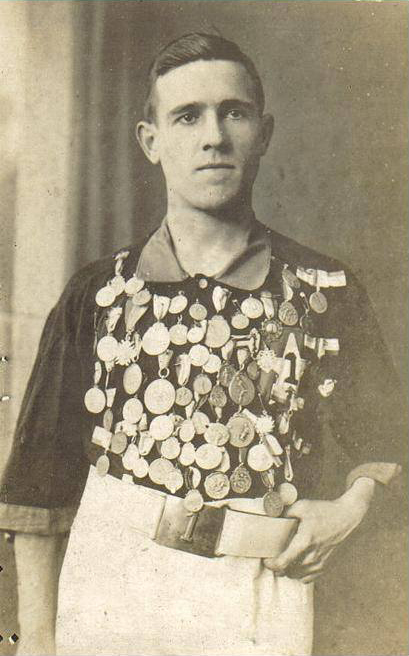
- Unzaga with medals

Personal information
- Full name: Ramón Ignacio Unzaga Asla
- Date of birth: 18 July 1892
- Place of birth: Deusto, Bilbao, Spain
- Date of death: 31 August 1923 (aged 31)
- Place of death: Cabrero, Chile
- Position: Left-half

Senior career*
Years	Team	Apps	(Gls)
1912–1913	Minas Lota		
1914–1923	Estrella del Mar		

International career
1916–1920	Chile	8	(0)
- * Club domestic league appearances and goals

Ramón Ignacio Unzaga Asla (18 July 1892 – 31 August 1923) was a Spanish-born Chilean footballer recognized across sports historiography as the creator of the bicycle kick (known in the Spanish-speaking world as the chilena).

== Life ==
Born in Bilbao, Spain, he emigrated to Talcahuano, Chile, in 1906 at 12 years of age, with his parents. A sportsman, Unzaga practiced cycling, swimming, diving, water polo and football in addition to serve as a firefighter. In 1912 the twenty-year-old Unzaga impressed the Talcahuano sports delegation with his football ability, so they signed him to the football club. He began his career and adopted the Chilean nationality. Unzaga is attributed as the first person to create the bicycle kick, devising the move playing for his club team in 1914 in El Morro stadium of Talcahuano. The kick is labeled the chorera in honor of the team he played for that was called the escuela chorera (chorera school) at the time. In the Copa America of 1916 and 1920 playing for the Chile national team, Unzaga repeated the kick on various occasions in which the Argentine press labels the kick as la chilena.

Unzaga received many offers to play with international football clubs but always chose to stay with Club Atlético y de Fútbol Estrella de Mar of Talcahuano. On 15 May 2014, the municipality of Talcahuano inaugurated a monument of Ramon Unzaga in his honor.

Since that Unzaga's move was born in the El Morro Stadium, is in its honor that the stadium was renamed after him.
