= Demóstenes (footballer) =

Brazilian footballer (1892-1961)

Demósthenes
Personal information
- Full name: Demósthenes Correia de Syllos
- Date of birth: 17 January 1892
- Place of birth: Casa Branca, São Paulo, Brazil
- Date of death: 11 August 1961 (aged 69)
- Position: Forward

Senior career*
Years	Team	Apps	(Gls)
1915–1921	Palestra Itália		

International career
1916	Brazil	1	(0)
Medal record
Men's football
Representing Brazil
South American Championship
Third place	1916 Argentina
- * Club domestic league appearances and goals

Demósthenes Correia de Syllos (17 January 1892 – 11 August 1961), known as just Demósthenes, was a Brazilian footballer who played as a forward. He played in one match for the Brazil national football team in 1916. He was also part of Brazil's squad for the 1916 South American Championship.
