= Antonio Picagli =

Brazilian footballer (1893-1978)

Personal information
- Date of birth: 21 April 1893
- Date of death: 12 October 1978 (aged 85)
- Position: Midfielder

International career
| Years | Team | Apps | (Gls) |
| 1917–1919 | Brazil | 2 | (0) |

Antonio Picagli (21 April 1893 – 12 October 1978) was a Brazilian footballer who played as a midfielder. He played in two matches for the Brazil national football team from 1917 to 1919. He was also part of Brazil's squad for the 1917 South American Championship.
