= Guillermo Frez =

Chilean footballer (1898-1965)

Personal information
- Date of birth: 19 November 1898
- Date of death: 19 February 1965 (aged 66)
- Position: Forward

International career
Years	Team	Apps	(Gls)
1919	Chile	1	(0)

Guillermo Frez (19 November 1898 – 19 February 1965) was a Chilean footballer. He played in one match for the Chile national football team in 1919. He was also part of Chile's squad for the 1919 South American Championship.
