= Asociación Atlética Eureka =

Argentine football club (1915–1920)

Eureka
- Full name: Asociación Atlética Eureka
- Nickname: Verdiblanco
- Founded: 14 January 1915
- Dissolved: 1920; 106 years ago (merged to Sportivo Palermo)
- Ground: Avellaneda, Greater Buenos Aires
- League: Primera División
- 1919: 4°
Home colours

Asociación Atlética Eureka, mostly known as Eureka, was an Argentine football club located in Barracas, Buenos Aires, that played in the top division of Argentine football, Primera División for one season. It was one of the shortest lifetimes clubs of Argentine football, with less than five years active until it was merged to Sportivo Palermo.

== History ==
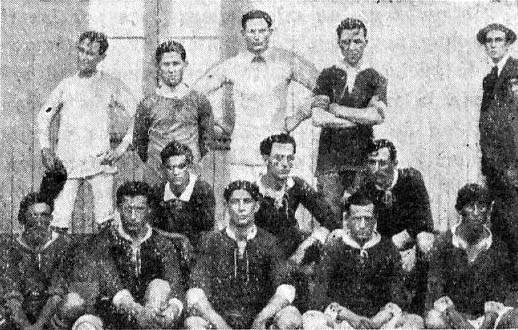
Eureka squad that played San Telmo in Segunda División, 1916

The club was established on January 14, 1915, by a group of former members of recently dissolved Club Independientes de La Plata. They sent an affiliation request to the Argentine Football Association to register Eureka in official competitions. The original request was rejected although the AFA gave its approval short time later, therefore Eureka became a member of the Association.

In 1916, Eureka lost the semi-final v. San Telmo to achieve a place in División Intermedia, the second division by those times. Nevertheless, Eureka won the Intermedia championship two years later, promoting to Primera División only three years after its foundation. In their road to the main division, Eureka had to play a final v. Almagro (first of Group B). The final game ended 1–1 so a rematch was scheduled at Racing Club stadium, with Eureka winning 2–1.

Eureka debuted in Primera División in 1919, where the squad finished 4th of 19 teams, although the championship was definitely suspended with only 10 rounds played. That would be the only and last participation of Eureka in Primera División, so the club was taken over by Sportivo Palermo, who debuted in the top division in 1920, playing consecutively until 1932, when the club was relegated to second division.

Eureka was headquartered in Barracas, with its field located in Floresta neighborhood. The stadium would later move to Avellaneda, in Greater Buenos Aires.

== Colors ==
Although some versions stated that Eureka jersey was black and yellow in vertical stripes (similar to Uruguayan club Peñarol), the club never wore that colors. Eureka's jersey was green and white in vertical stripes, until the club shortly wore the blue colors of Sportivo Palermo.

== Titles ==
- División Intermedia (1): 1918

== See also ==
- Sportivo Palermo
