= Cayetano Saporiti =

Uruguayan footballer (1887–1954)

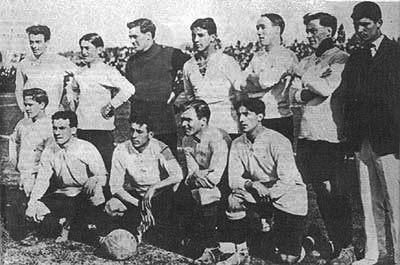
- Uruguay's national team at the Copa America in 1917. Saporiti standing No. 3 from the left.

Personal information
- Date of birth: January 14, 1887
- Place of birth: Montevideo, Uruguay
- Date of death: 1954 (aged 66–67)
- Place of death: Montevideo, Uruguay
- Position: Goalkeeper

Senior career*
Years	Team	Apps	(Gls)
1903–1920	Montevideo Wanderers	342	(?)

International career
1905–1919	Uruguay	56	(0)
Medal record
Men's football
Representing Uruguay
South American Championship
Winner	1916 Argentina
Winner	1917 Uruguay
Runner-up	1919 Brazil
- * Club domestic league appearances and goals

Cayetano Saporiti (January 14, 1887 – 1954) was a Uruguayan football goalkeeper who played 56 games for the Uruguay national team between 1905 and 1919.

== Biography ==
He made his debut for the national team at 18 years 179 days making him the third youngest international goalkeeper in history.

He was part of the Uruguay team that won the Copa América tournament in 1916 and 1917, he also participated in 1919.

His record of 51 caps in the goalkeeper position stood as a national record until it was surpassed by Rodolfo Rodríguez in 1983.

Saporiti played club football for Montevideo Wanderers, when they were one of the strongest teams in the amateur era of Uruguayan football and is remembered as one of the club's most important players.

== Honours ==
=== Uruguay ===
- Copa América: (2) 1916, 1917

=== Wanderers ===
- Uruguayan league: (2) 1906, 1908
- Copa de Honor: (2) 1908, 1910
- Copa Competencia: (5) 1906, 1908, 1911, 1917, 1918
- Copa de Honor Cousenier: (1) 1908
- Cup Tie Competition: (3) 1911, 1917, 1918
