= Pedro Martínez (Argentine footballer) =

Argentine footballer

Personal information
- Date of birth: 19 May 1893
- Place of birth: Buenos Aires, Argentina
- Date of death: 19 October 1931 (aged 38)
- Position: Midfielder

Senior career*
Years	Team	Apps	(Gls)
1912–20	Huracán		
1921–23	Estudiantil Porteño		

International career
1916–1919	Argentina	15	(0)
Medal record
Men's football
Representing Argentina
South American Championship
Runner-up	1916 Argentina
Runner-up	1917 Uruguay
Third place	1919 Brazil
- * Club domestic league appearances and goals

Pedro Martínez (19 May 1893 – 19 October 1931) was an Argentine footballer. He played in 15 Argentina national football team matches from 1916 to 1919. He was part of Argentina's squad for the 1916, 1917, and 1919 South American Championship.
