= Alejandro Elordi =

Argentine footballer

Personal information
- Date of birth: 26 February 1894
- Position: Defender

International career
Years	Team	Apps	(Gls)
1917	Argentina	1	(0)

Alejandro Elordi (26 February 1894, date of death unknown) was an Argentine footballer. He played in one match for the Argentina national football team in 1917. He was also part of Argentina's squad for the 1917 South American Championship.
