= Jorge Pacheco (footballer) =

Uruguayan footballer (1889-1957)

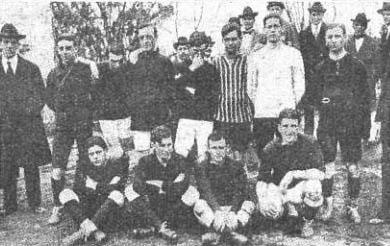

Personal information
- Full name: Jorge Germán Pacheco
- Date of birth: 26 October 1889
- Date of death: 1957 (aged 67–68)

International career
Years	Team	Apps	(Gls)
1910–1917	Uruguay	29	(0)
Medal record
Men's football
Representing Uruguay
South American Championship
Winner	1916 Argentina
Winner	1917 Uruguay

Jorge Germán Pacheco (1889 – 1957) was a Uruguayan footballer. He played in 29 matches for the Uruguay national football team from 1910 to 1917. He was also part of Uruguay's winning squads for the 1916 and 1917 South American Championships.

== Honours ==
Uruguay

- South American Championship: 1916, 1917
