= Luis García (Chilean footballer) =

Chilean association football player

Personal information
- Full name: Luis Alberto García
- Position: Defender

Senior career*
Years	Team	Apps	(Gls)
1917–1926	Thunder de Coquimbo		

International career
1917	Chile	4	(0)
- * Club domestic league appearances and goals

Luis Alberto García was a Chilean footballer who played as a defender and made four appearances for the Chile in 1917.

== Career ==
García played club football for Thunder de Coquimbo. In 1917, he played for the Chile national team at the 1917 South American Championship held in Uruguay. He played in all three matches at the tournament, making his international debut on 30 September 1917 against Uruguay, which finished as a 4–0 loss. In the next match against Argentina, he scored an own goal as Chile lost 1–0. Chile lost the last match 1–0 against Brazil, finishing last in the tournament without any points or goals scored. García earned his final cap for Chile against Argentina in a friendly played on 21 October 1917, a week after the tournament ended, which finished as a 1–1 draw.

== Career statistics ==
=== International ===
Chile
Year	Apps	Goals
1917	4	0
Total	4	0
