= Caetano Izzo =

Brazilian footballer (1897–1973)

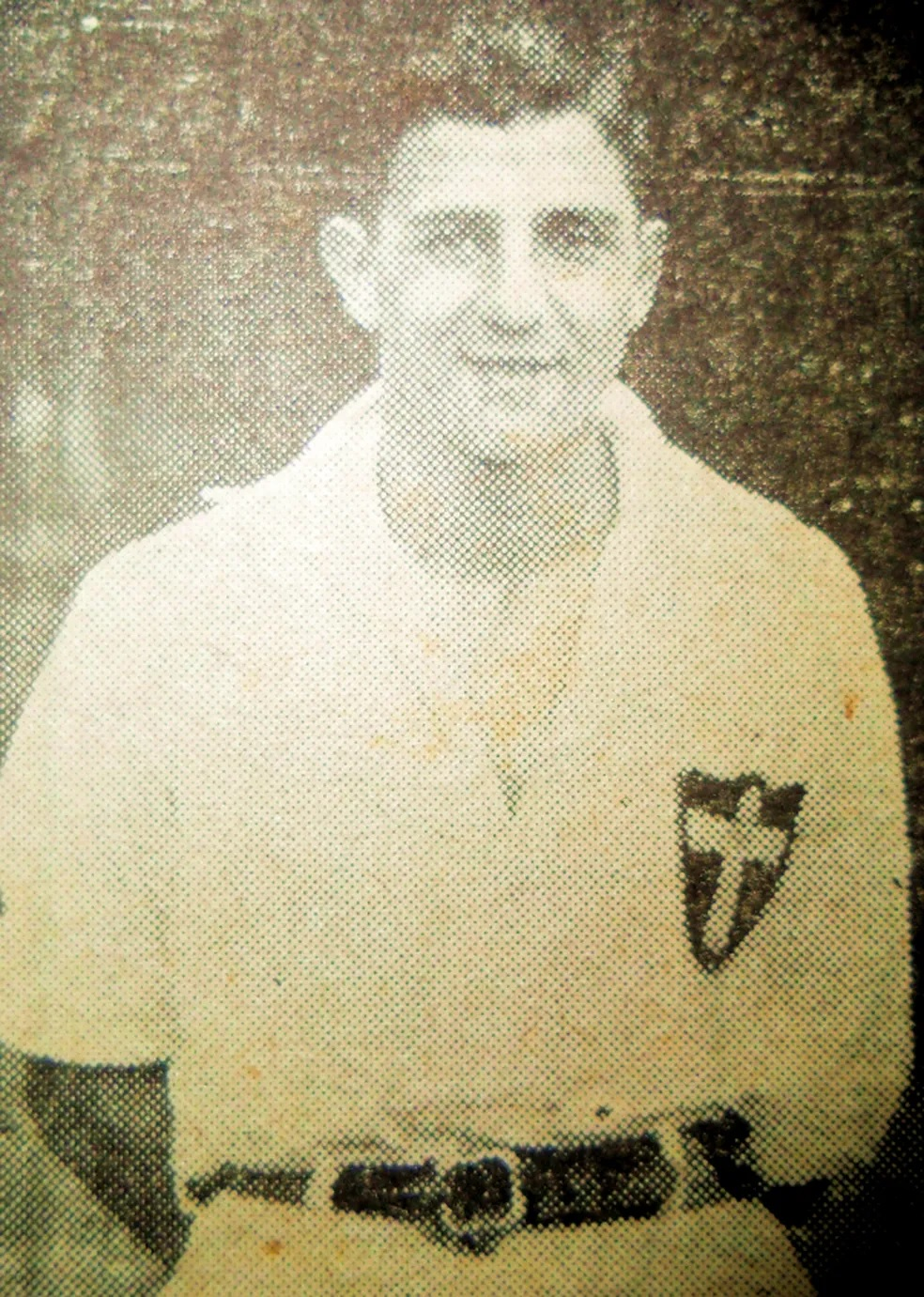

Personal information
- Date of birth: 11 May 1897
- Place of birth: São Paulo, Brazil
- Date of death: 27 May 1973 (aged 76)
- Place of death: Marília, Brazil
- Position: Outside right

Senior career*
Years	Team	Apps	(Gls)
1914–1916	Ruggerone		
1917–1921	Palestra Itália		
1922–1923	São Bento		
1924–1925	Internacional		
1926	Independência		

International career
1917	Brazil	4	(1)
- * Club domestic league appearances and goals

Caetano Izzo (11 May 1897 in São Paulo – 27 May 1973 Marília) was a Brazilian footballer who played as a forward. He played in four matches for the Brazil national football team in 1917. He was also part of Brazil's squad for the 1917 South American Championship.
