= José Benincasa =

Uruguayan footballer

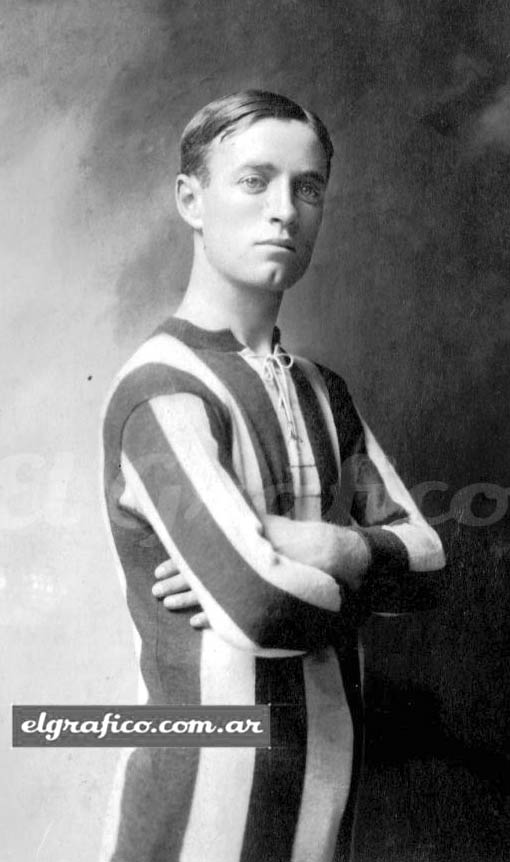
- Benincasa with River Plate FC

Personal information
- Date of birth: 16 June 1891
- Position: Defender

International career
Years	Team	Apps	(Gls)
1910–1925	Uruguay	40	(0)

José Benincasa (born 16 June 1891, date of death unknown) was a Uruguayan footballer. He played in 40 matches for the Uruguay national football team from 1910 to 1925. He was also part of Uruguay's squad for the 1919 South American Championship.
