= Sílvio Lagreca =

Brazilian football player and manager

Personal information
- Date of birth: 14 June 1895
- Place of birth: Piracicaba, Brazil
- Date of death: 30 April 1966 (aged 70)
- Place of death: São Paulo, Brazil
- Position: Midfielder

Senior career*
Years	Team	Apps	(Gls)
1914–1921	São Bento		
1922–1925	Botafogo		

International career
1916–1919	Brazil	10	(1)

Managerial career
- 1914: Brazil
- 1916: Brazil
- 1940: Brazil
Medal record
Men's football
Representing Brazil (as player)
South American Championship
Third place	1916 Argentina
Third place	1917 Uruguay
Representing Brazil (as manager)
South American Championship
Third place	1916 Argentina
Third place	1917 Uruguay
- * Club domestic league appearances and goals

Sílvio Lagreca (14 June 1895 – 30 April 1966) was a Brazilian football player, manager, and referee.

Lagreca was born in Piracicaba, Brazil, in 1895. At a club level, he played for São Bento and Botafogo.

Alongside Rubens Sales, he was also the first manager of the Brazil national football team in 1914, which he also managed two further times, in 1916 and 1940.

Lagreca died in São Paulo in 1966.

== Honours ==
- Roca Cup: 1914
