= Juan Alvarado (Chilean footballer) =

Chilean footballer (1893-1969)

Personal information
- Date of birth: 1 December 1893
- Date of death: 19 December 1969 (aged 76)
- Position: Midfielder

International career
Years	Team	Apps	(Gls)
1917	Chile	3	(0)

Juan Alvarado (1 December 1893 – 19 December 1969) was a Chilean footballer. He played in three matches for the Chile national football team in 1917. He was also part of Chile's squad for the 1917 South American Championship.
