= Manuel Guerrero (footballer) =

Chilean footballer (1896-1947)

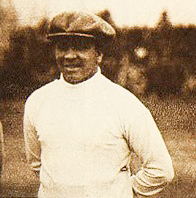

Personal information
- Date of birth: 13 October 1896
- Date of death: 18 July 1947 (aged 50)
- Position: Goalkeeper

International career
Years	Team	Apps	(Gls)
1916	Chile	4	(0)

Manuel Guerrero (13 October 1896 – 18 July 1947) was a Chilean footballer. He played in four matches for the Chile national football team in 1916. He was also part of Chile's squad for the 1916 South American Championship.
