= Casemiro do Amaral =

Brazilian footballer of Portuguese descent (1892-1939)

Personal information
- Full name: Casemiro do Amaral
- Date of birth: 14 September 1892
- Place of birth: Lisbon, Portugal
- Date of death: 18 October 1939 (aged 47)
- Position: Goalkeeper

Senior career*
Years	Team	Apps	(Gls)
1911	America	-	(-)
1912	Germânia	-	(-)
1913–1914	Corinthians	-	(-)
1915–1917	Mackenzie	-	(-)
1918–1920	Corinthians	-	(-)

International career
1916–1917	Brazil	6	(0)
Medal record
Men's football
Representing Brazil
South American Championship
Third place	1916 Argentina
Third place	1917 Uruguay
- * Club domestic league appearances and goals

Casemiro do Amaral (14 September 1892 – 18 October 1939) was a Brazilian footballer of Portuguese descent who played as a goalkeeper.

Although he was born in Lisbon, Casemiro emigrated to Brazil, where his career started in 1911, at America, from Rio de Janeiro, before moving to Germânia, from São Paulo in 1912. Casemiro also played for Mackenzie from 1915 to 1917 and for Corinthians between 1913 and 1914, and from 1918 to 1920.

Casemiro played six times for Brazil. He was also included in Brazil's Copa América squads in 1916 and 1917.

== Honours ==
Corinthians

- Campeonato Paulista: 1914
