= Haroldo (footballer, born 1896) =

Brazilian footballer (1896–1955)

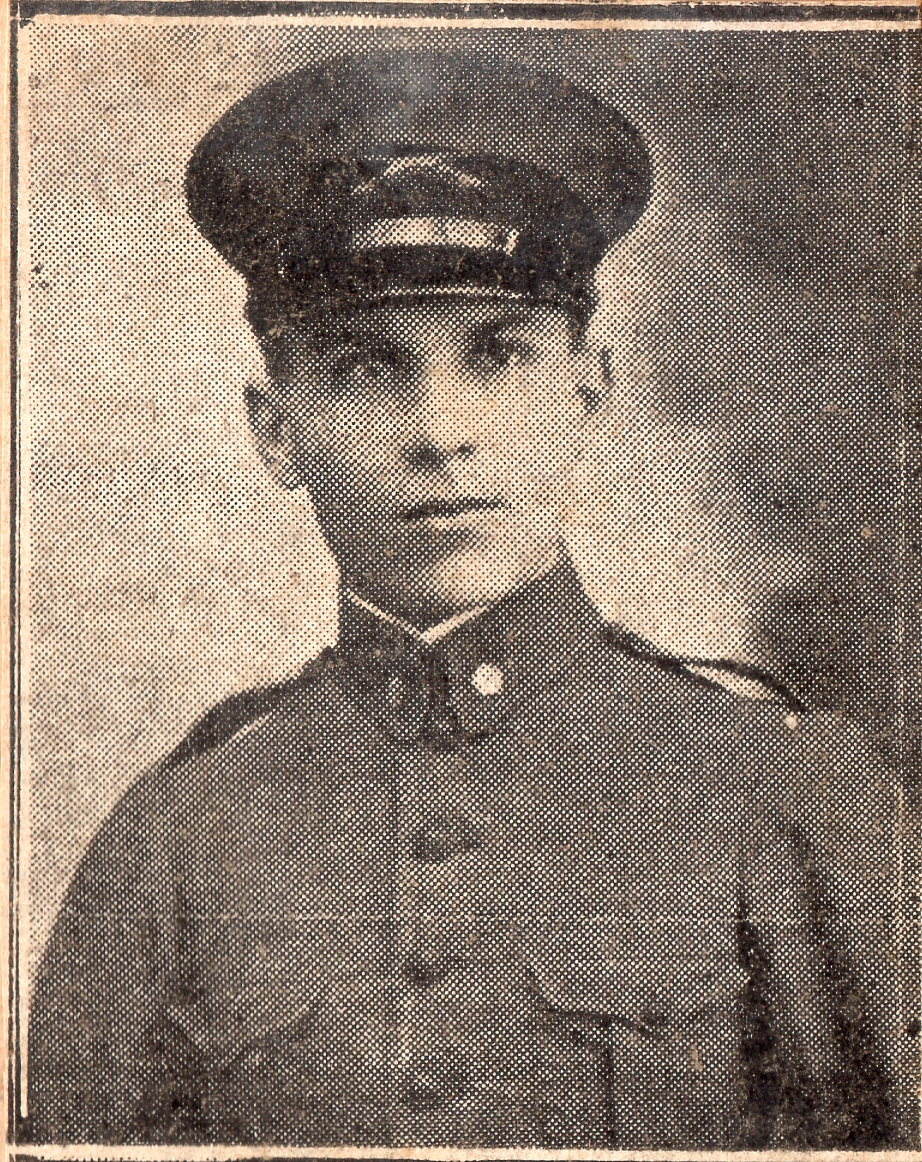

Personal information
- Full name: Haroldo Pires Domingues
- Date of birth: 18 March 1896
- Place of birth: Rio de Janeiro, Brazil
- Position: Forward

Senior career*
Years	Team	Apps	(Gls)
1913–1916	America-RJ		
1917–1922	Santos		

International career
1917–1919	Brazil	4	(4)
- * Club domestic league appearances and goals

Haroldo Pires Domingues (born 18 March 1896 – 13 September 1955), known mononymously as Haroldo, was a Brazilian footballer who played as a forward. He made four appearances for the Brazil national team from 1917 to 1919, scoring four goals. He was also part of Brazil's squad for the 1917 South American Championship.
