= 1916 South American Championship =

Football tournament

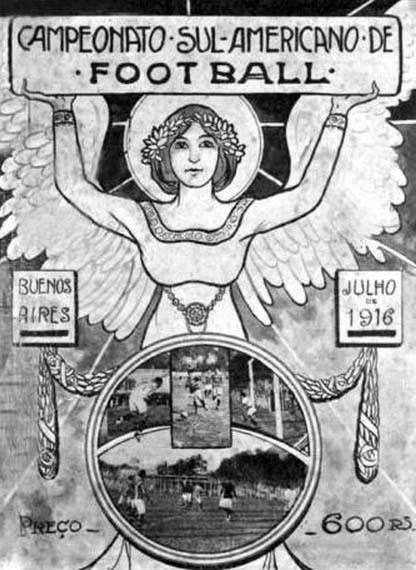
- Brazilian poster advertising the championship

Tournament details
- Host country: Argentina
- Dates: 2–17 July
- Teams: 4
- Venues: 2 (in 2 host cities)

Final positions
- Champions: Uruguay (1st title)
- Runners-up: Argentina
- Third place: Brazil
- Fourth place: Chile

Tournament statistics
- Matches played: 6
- Goals scored: 18 (3 per match)
- Attendance: 84,200 (14,033 per match)
- Top scorer: (Uruguay) Isabelino Gradín (3 goals)

The 1916 South American Championship (Spanish: Campeonato Sudamericano 1916, Portuguese: Campeonato Sul-Americano de 1916) was the inaugural international association football championship for members of the Confederación Sudamericana de Fútbol (CONMEBOL). Hosted by Argentina, the competition ran from 2–17 July 1916 and was contested by the national teams of Argentina, Brazil, Chile and Uruguay.

During the competition, which was staged as part of celebrations to commemorate the centenary of Argentina's independence, the four associations of the participating teams met and founded CONMEBOL on 9 July.

The competition was due to conclude on 16 July but the final and decisive match between Argentina and Uruguay was suspended after five minutes following a riot among supporters. It concluded the following day when the teams drew 0–0 and Uruguay won the title by a single point.

== Background ==
In 1910, the Asociación del Fútbol Argentino (AFA) organised a tournament to mark the 100th anniversary of the May Revolution. The Copa Centenario Revolución de Mayo was contested by the national teams of Argentina, Chile and Uruguay and is considered to be a precursor to the South American Championship. Argentina won the competition after defeating both Chile and Uruguay.

Six years later, the AFA organised a second tournament, this time to celebrate the centenary of the Argentine Declaration of Independence. Alongside the three who had contested the Copa Centenario Revolución de Mayo, Brazil were invited to compete and the South American Championship was born.

== Format ==
The tournament was played as a round-robin where each team would play all of the others once. The winner would be decided by the total number of points obtained across all matches played.

=== Participants ===
- Argentina
- Brazil
- Chile
- Uruguay

== Venue ==
All matches were held at the Estadio GEBA in Buenos Aires except for the last match which was suspended before being completed at the Estadio Racing Club in Avellaneda.

Buenos Aires	Avellaneda
Estadio GEBA	Estadio Racing Club
Capacity: 18,000	Capacity: 30,000
1916 South American Championship is located in Argentina

== Summary ==
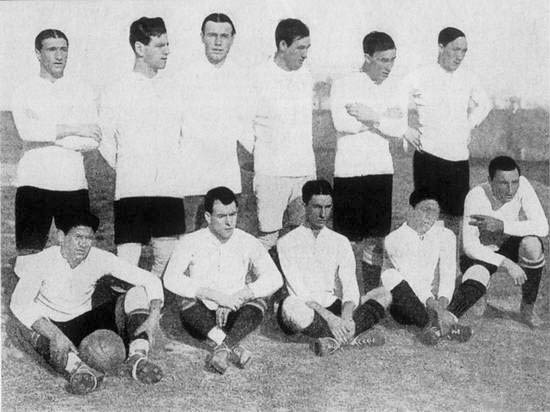
Uruguay, the first South American Champion

The competition began on 2 July when Uruguay defeated Chile 4–0. Four days later, hosts Argentina opened the competition with a 6–1 win against Chile. On 8 July, Chile drew 1–1 with Brazil in their last match of the competition. With half the matches played, Argentina and Uruguay were level with two points each at the top of the table.

On 10 July, Argentina drew 1–1 with Brazil to go top of the table. Two days later, Uruguay leapfrogged Argentina after defeating Brazil 2–1 to set up a winner-takes-all final match against Argentina. The match began on 16 July at the Estadio GEBA but was suspended after five minutes with the score at 0–0 following supporters riots. It was continued the following day at the Estadio Racing Club in Avellaneda. No goals were scored as it finished goalless and Uruguay won the inaugural title.

== Table ==
Pos	Team	Pld	W	D	L	GF	GA	GD	Pts
1	Uruguay	3	2	1	0	6	1	+5	5
2	Argentina	3	1	2	0	7	2	+5	4
3	Brazil	3	0	2	1	3	4	−1	2
4	Chile	3	0	1	2	2	11	−9	1

== Results ==
2 July 1916

Uruguay	4–0	Chile
Piendibene 44', 75'; Gradín 55', 70'

Estadio GEBA, Buenos Aires
Attendance: 3,000
Referee: Hugo Gronda (Argentina)

6 July 1916

Argentina	6–1	Chile
Ohaco 2', 75'; J.D. Brown 60' (pen.), 62' (pen.); Marcovecchio 67', 89'		Báez 44'

Estadio GEBA, Buenos Aires
Attendance: 18,000
Referee: Sidney Pullen (Brazil)

8 July 1916

Brazil	1–1	Chile
Demósthenes 29'		Salazar 85'

Estadio GEBA, Buenos Aires
Attendance: 15,000
Referee: León Peyrou (Uruguay)

10 July 1916

Argentina	1–1	Brazil
Laguna 10'		Alencar 23'

Estadio GEBA, Buenos Aires
Attendance: 16,200
Referee: Carlos Fanta (Chile)

12 July 1916

Uruguay	2–1	Brazil
Gradín 58'; Tognola 77'		Friedenreich 8'

Estadio GEBA, Buenos Aires
Attendance: 15,000
Referee: Carlos Fanta (Chile)

16 July 1916

Argentina	0–0 (abandoned)	Uruguay

Estadio GEBA, Buenos Aires

17 July 1916

Argentina	0–0	Uruguay

Estadio Racing Club, Avellaneda
Attendance: 17,000
Referee: Carlos Fanta (Chile)

== Goalscorers ==
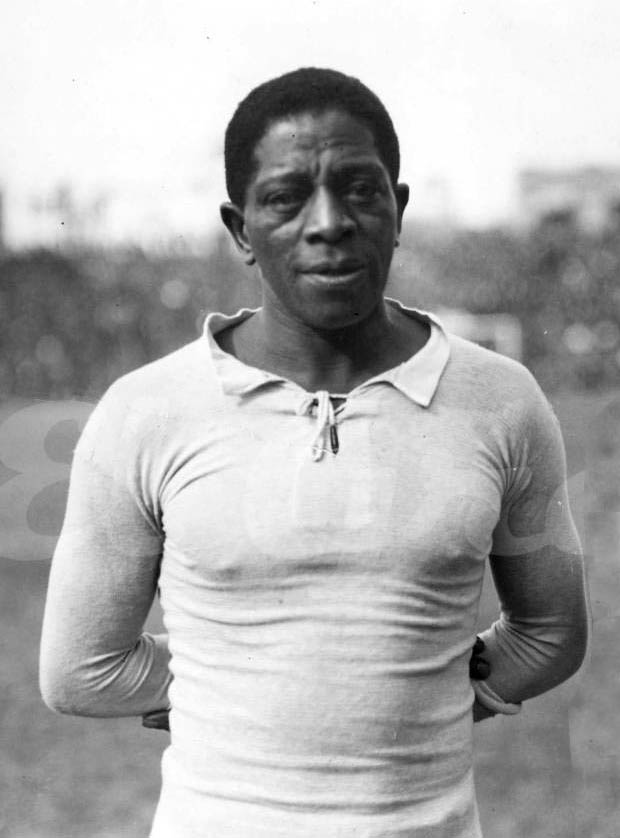
Isabelino Gradín, topscorer

There were 18 goals scored in 6 matches, for an average of 3 goals per match.

3 goals

- (Uruguay) Isabelino Gradín

2 goals

- (Argentina) Juan Domingo Brown
- (Argentina) Alberto Marcovecchio
- (Argentina) Alberto Ohaco
- (Uruguay) José Piendibene

1 goal

- (Argentina) José Laguna
- (Brazil) Alencar
- (Brazil) Demósthenes
- (Brazil) Arthur Friedenreich
- (Chile) Telésforo Báez
- (Chile) Hernando Salazar
- (Uruguay) José Tognola
