= 1917 South American Championship =

Football tournament

Tournament details
- Host country: Uruguay
- Dates: 30 September – 14 October
- Teams: 4
- Venue(s): Parque Pereira, Montevideo

Final positions
- Champions: Uruguay (2nd title)
- Runners-up: Argentina
- Third place: Brazil
- Fourth place: Chile

Tournament statistics
- Matches played: 6
- Goals scored: 21 (3.5 per match)
- Attendance: 128,000 (21,333 per match)
- Top scorer: (Uruguay) Ángel Romano (4 goals)

The 1917 South American Championship (Spanish: Campeonato Sudamericano 1917, Portuguese: Campeonato Sul-Americano de 1917) was the second international association football championship for members of the Confederación Sudamericana de Fútbol (CONMEBOL). Hosted by Uruguay, the competition ran from 30 September – 14 October 1917 and was contested by the national teams of Argentina, Brazil, Chile and Uruguay.

Hosts and defending champions Uruguay successfully retained their title after defeating Argentina 1–0 in the final and decisive match of the round-robin tournament.

== Background ==
In 1910, the Asociación del Fútbol Argentino (AFA) organised a tournament to mark the 100th anniversary of the May Revolution. The Copa Centenario Revolución de Mayo was contested by the national teams of Argentina, Chile and Uruguay and is considered to be a precursor to the South American Championship. Six years later, the AFA organised a second tournament, this time to celebrate the centenary of the Argentine Declaration of Independence. Alongside the three who had contested the Copa Centenario Revolución de Mayo, Brazil were invited to compete and the South American Championship was born. During the competition, the four associations of the competing teams met on 9 July 1916 and founded the Confederación Sudamericana de Fútbol (CONMEBOL).

Uruguay were the defending champions having won the inaugural championship after drawing with Argentina in the final and decisive match.

== Format ==
The tournament was played as a round-robin where each team would play all of the others once. The winner would be decided by the total number of points obtained across all matches played.

=== Participants ===
- Argentina
- Brazil
- Chile
- Uruguay

== Venue ==
All matches were held at the Parque Pereira in Montevideo.

Montevideo
Parque Pereira
Capacity: 40,000
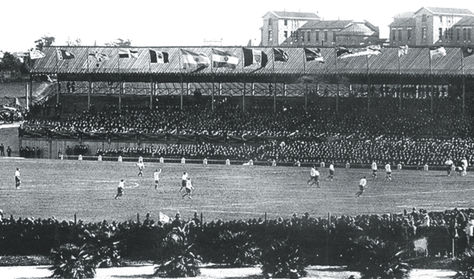

== Summary ==
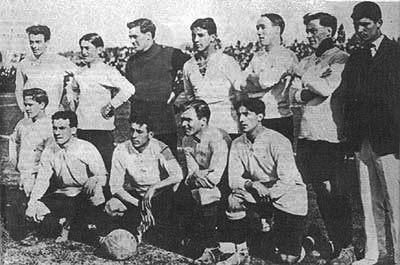
The Uruguay team that won the championship

The competition began on 30 September when hosts Uruguay began the defence of their title with a 4–0 win against Chile. Three days later, Argentina came from behind to defeat Brazil 4–2. On 6 October, Argentina defeated Chile 1–0. With half the matches played, Argentina were top of the table with four points, two ahead of Uruguay who had a game in hand.

The following day, Uruguay defeated Brazil 4–0 to set up a winner-takes-all final match against Argentina. In the meantime, on 12 October, Brazil defeated Chile 5–0 in their final game. Two days later, Héctor Scarone scored the only goal of the match as Uruguay defeated Argentina 1–0 to successfully defend their title.

== Table ==
Pos	Team	Pld	W	D	L	GF	GA	GD	Pts
1	Uruguay	3	3	0	0	9	0	+9	6
2	Argentina	3	2	0	1	5	3	+2	4
3	Brazil	3	1	0	2	7	8	−1	2
4	Chile	3	0	0	3	0	10	−10	0

== Results ==
30 September 1917

Uruguay	4–0	Chile
C.Scarone 20', 62' (pen.); Romano 44', 75'

Parque Pereira, Montevideo
Attendance: 22,000
Referee: Germán Guassone (Argentina)

3 October 1917

Argentina	4–2	Brazil
Calomino 15'; Ohaco 56' (pen.), 58' (pen.); A. Blanco 80'		Neco 8'; Lagreca 39' (pen.)

Parque Pereira, Montevideo
Attendance: 20,000
Referee: Carlos Fanta (Chile)

6 October 1917

Argentina	1–0	Chile
García 76' (o.g.)

Parque Pereira, Montevideo
Attendance: 15,000
Referee: Álvaro Saralegui (Uruguay)

7 October 1917

Uruguay	4–0	Brazil
H. Scarone 8'; Romano 17', 77'; C. Scarone 86'

Parque Pereira, Montevideo
Attendance: 21,000
Referee: Germán Guassone (Argentina)

12 October 1917

Brazil	5–0	Chile
Caetano 21'; Neco 23'; Haroldo 26', 59'; Amílcar 41'

Parque Pereira, Montevideo
Attendance: 10,000
Referee: Ricardo Vallarino (Uruguay)

14 October 1917

Uruguay	1–0	Argentina
H. Scarone 62'

Parque Pereira, Montevideo
Attendance: 40,000
Referee: Juan Livingstone (Chile)

== Goalscorers ==
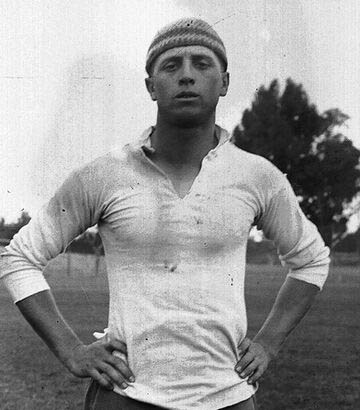
Ángel Romano, top scorer

There were 21 goals scored in 6 matches, for an average of 3.5 goals per match.

4 goals

- (Uruguay) Ángel Romano

3 goals

- (Uruguay) Carlos Scarone

2 goals

- (Argentina) Alberto Ohaco
- (Brazil) Haroldo
- (Brazil) Neco
- (Uruguay) Héctor Scarone

1 goal

- (Argentina) Antonio Blanco
- (Argentina) Pedro Calomino
- (Brazil) Amílcar
- (Brazil) Caetano
- (Brazil) Silvio Lagreca

1 own goal

- (Chile) Luis García (against Argentina)
