= 1919 in Brazil =

Events in the year 1919 in Brazil.

== Incumbents ==
=== Federal government ===
- President: Delfim Moreira (acting; until 28 July); Epitácio Pessoa (from 28 July)
- Vice President: Delfim Moreira

=== Governors ===
- Alagoas: José Fernandes de Barros Lima
- Amazonas: Pedro de Alcântara Bacelar
- Bahia: Antônio Ferrão Muniz de Aragão
- Ceará: João Tomé de Sabóia e Silva
- Goiás:
  - until April 24: Joaquim Rufino Ramos Jubé
  - from April 24: João Alves de Castro
- Maranhão: Urbano Santos
- Mato Grosso: Francisco de Aquino Correia
- Minas Gerais: Artur Bernardes
- Pará: Lauro Sodré
- Paraíba: Francisco Camilo de Holanda
- Paraná: Afonso Camargo
- Pernambuco:
  - until 18 December: Manuel Antônio Pereira Borba
  - 18 December - 24 December: José Henrique Carneiro da Cunha
  - from 24 December: José Rufino Bezerra Cavalcanti
- Piauí: Eurípedes Clementino de Aguiar
- Rio Grande do Norte: Joaquim Ferreira Chaves
- Rio Grande do Sul: Antônio Augusto Borges de Medeiros
- Santa Catarina: Hercílio Luz
- São Paulo: Altino Arantes
- Sergipe: José Joaquim Pereira Lobo

=== Vice governors ===
- Rio Grande do Norte:
- São Paulo:

== Events ==
- 13 April - In the presidential election brought about by the death of Rodrigues Alves, Epitácio Pessoa of the Paraíba Republican Party receives 71.0% of the vote.
- 24 April - Ford Brasil, a subsidiary of the Ford Motor Company, is founded.
- 11-29 May - The 1919 South American Championship football tournament is held in Rio de Janeiro, with Brazil winning it.
- 28 July - Epitácio Pessoa takes office as president, replacing acting President Delfim Moreira, who continues as vice president.

== Births ==
- 13 March - Edgard Cognat, painter and sculptor (died 1994)
- 10 May - Antônio Olinto, writer and translator (died 2006)
- 12 June - Rui Moreira Lima, fighter pilot (died 2013)
- 21 June - Nelson Gonçalves, singer and songwriter (died 1998)
- 8 July - Helena Salles, swimmer (died 2011)
- 18 October - Orlando Drummond, actor (died 2021)
- 11 November - Armando Falcão, politician (died 2010)
- 31 December - Carmen da Silva, psychoanalyst and feminist journalist (died 1985)

== Deaths ==
- 16 January - Rodrigues Alves, President-elect of Brazil (born 1848; Spanish flu)

== See also ==
- 1919 in Brazilian football
