= Argentina–Brazil football rivalry =

Historic international football rivalry

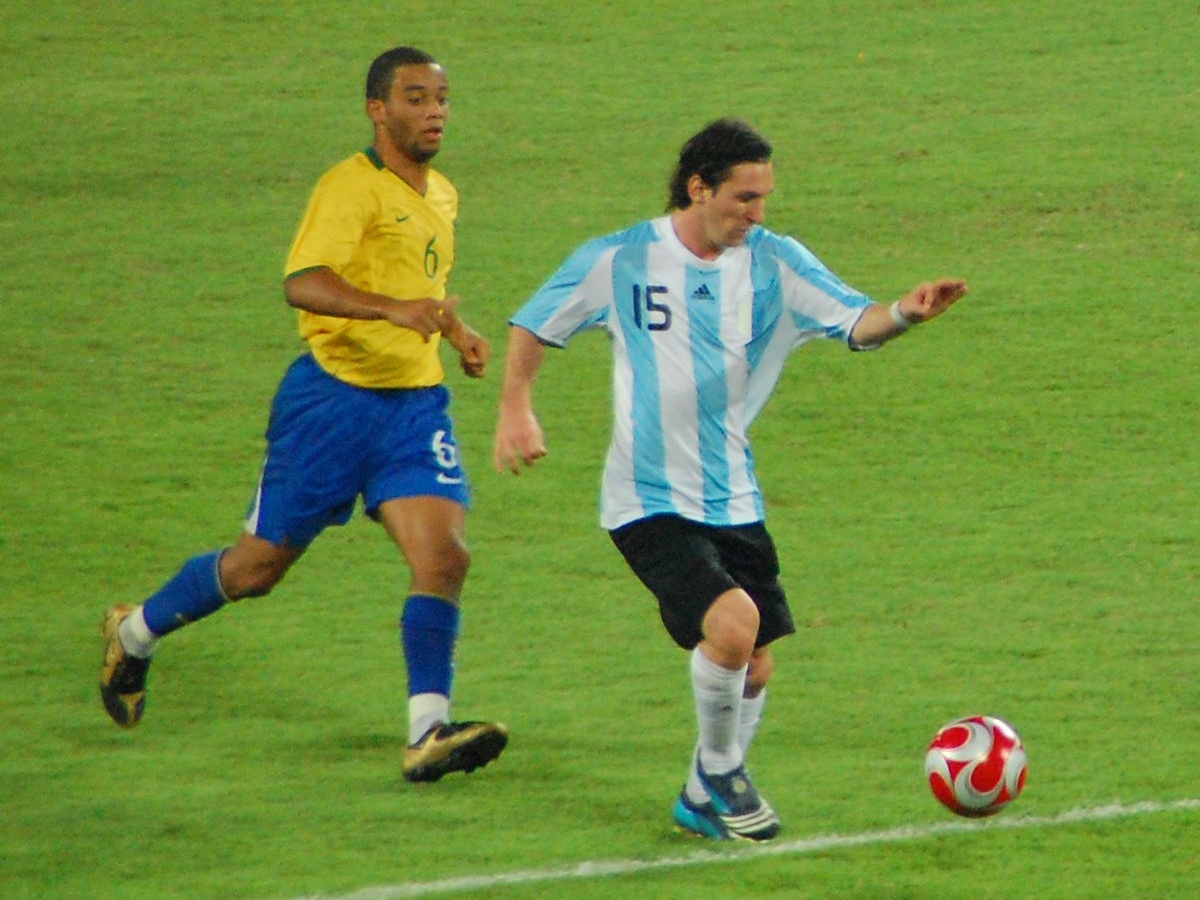
- Marcelo (Brazil) and Lionel Messi (Argentina) during a match in the 2008 Summer Olympics
- Other names: Clásico sudamericano Spanish: Clásico sudamericano Portuguese: Clássico Sul-americano
- Location: South America (CONMEBOL)
- Teams: Argentina; Brazil
- First meeting: 20 September 1914; Friendly; Argentina 3–0 Brazil
- Latest meeting: 25 March 2025; 2026 World Cup qualifiers Argentina 4–1 Brazil

Statistics
- Total meetings: Disputed (Note: According to many sources, 106 official games. Other sources place the number at 111 or 112. This discrepancy is mainly due to 6 contentious matches, wherein some sources count them as official games, some don't, and many others count them in part. They are, respectively: • 6 October 1920: Argentina 3–1 Brazil; many sources claim this wasn't a 'Class A' match, as both teams played with 8 players each. • 22 October 1922: Brazil 2–1 Argentina; many sources claim this wasn't a 'Class A' match, as Brazil played with their reserve team because their A team had played at the 1922 South American Championship final the same day. • 2 December 1923: Argentina 0–2 Brazil (Copa Confraternidad); many sources claim this wasn't a 'Class A' match, as Argentina didn't play with its A team because it had played a decisive game against Uruguay the same day, in the 1923 South American Championship. • 5 December 1956: Brazil 1–2 Argentina (Copa Colombo); many sources claim this wasn't a 'Class A' match, as Brazil didn't play under its official national team, but rather the Rio de Janeiro metropolitan team. • 7 August 1968: Brazil 4–1 Argentina; many sources claim this wasn't a 'Class A' match, as Brazil didn't play under its official national team, but rather the Rio de Janeiro metropolitan team. • 11 August 1968: Brazil 3–2 Argentina; many sources claim this wasn't a 'Class A' match, as Brazil didn't play under its official national team, but rather a Minas Gerais state team. For more information about the topic,see 'Most wins')
- Most wins: Disputed (Note: Since the total match count between both national teams is a contentious topic, there's also no consensus on which team has accumulated the most wins; for instance, a lot of sources do not count some particular cases where Argentina's first national team played against certain Brazilian state teams. Additionally, other sources argue against counting matches between Argentina or Brazil's first national teams, where either team played against the other's reserve team, thus not qualifying the game asan 'International Class A' match.); According to many sources: Argentina (41) or Argentina (43) or Argentina (44) or Brazil (43)
- Most player appearances: (Argentina) Javier Zanetti (16)
- Top scorer: (Brazil) Pelé (8)
- Largest victory: Brazil 1–6 Argentina; Roca Cup (5 March 1940)

The Argentina–Brazil football rivalry, also referred to as the South American derby (Spanish: Clásico sudamericano; Portuguese: Clássico Sul-americano), the Superderby of the Americas or simply the Superderby is a football rivalry between the national teams of Brazil and Argentina. The rivalry is considered one of the fiercest in international football, having been described by FIFA as the "essence of football rivalry".

== Background ==
The games between the two nations are known for both the skill involved and the level of competitiveness, whether it be among individual players, club teams or national fixtures. Both teams are often considered among the best in the world and usually regarded as favourites for major football tournaments such as the FIFA World Cup, CONMEBOL and the Copa América. They are also routinely ranked among the top nations in both the FIFA World Rankings and the World Football Elo Ratings.

Moreover, throughout football's history, both nations have had players who, at one point or another, were considered to be the very best in the world, such as Alfredo Di Stéfano, Diego Maradona, and Lionel Messi from Argentina, and Pelé, Ronaldo, and Ronaldinho from Brazil.

In a head-to-head comparison of senior titles, Brazil has won five FIFA World Cups, while Argentina has won three. In contrast, Argentina has won the Copa América sixteen times, compared to Brazil's nine. The duo also has many independent achievements in inter-confederation competitions, such as the FIFA Confederations Cup, won four times by Brazil and once by Argentina, the CONMEBOL–UEFA Cup of Champions, twice for Argentina and none for Brazil, and the Panamerican Championship, won twice by Brazil and once by Argentina.

== History ==
The origins of the football rivalry between Argentina and Brazil can be traced back to a time before football became the massively popular sport that it is today in both countries. Since their first match in 1914, the men's senior national teams have faced each other in more than 100 matches, including friendlies, FIFA World Cup matches, and other official competitions.

Ever since Argentina's 3–0 victory over Brazil in 1914, the early years of the countries' football rivalry were defined by periods of non-engagement due to violent incidents. Notably, after a Copa América final turned violent in 1925, both teams refrained from competing in tournaments where the other was present (Brazil withdrawing from the Copa América until 1937), followed by a similar decade-long hiatus where, after a match in 1946, Argentina did not participate in any following World Cups until 1958.

Argentina would initially dominate the rivalry in a strict head-to-head count, going on to achieve considerable success in the Copa América, both with and without Brazil's attendance, winning twelve titles between 1921 and 1959 (placing second another seven times), which included a total of seven finals and won against Brazil (Brazil's first ever victory over Argentina in a final match would only come in 2004). However, after being the runner-up for the first ever World Cup in 1930, Argentina somewhat fell behind Brazil on the global stage, where the latter went on to win three World Cups in 1958, 1962, and 1970, while their figurehead player Pelé became the face of international football. Argentina would eventually win their first World Cup title as the host nation in 1978, after advancing from a hard-fought goalless draw against Brazil in the second group stage and ultimately winning the final match. Then came a second title in Mexico, in 1986, spearheaded by their own football icon, Maradona. The two teams would face each other again in the knockout stages for the 1990 World Cup, where Argentina was the eventual runner-up against West Germany. Brazil subsequently added two more titles to their record in 1994 and 2002, bringing their total to five, and Argentina went on to win the 2022 title, bringing their own total to three.

Between 1914 and 1976 the two nations also competed in the Roca Cup on 12 occasions. In 2011, the competition was reinstituted as the Superclassic of the Americas, which ran annually until 2019 (except in 2015 and 2016).

== Notable matches and incidents ==
=== 1925 Copa América ===
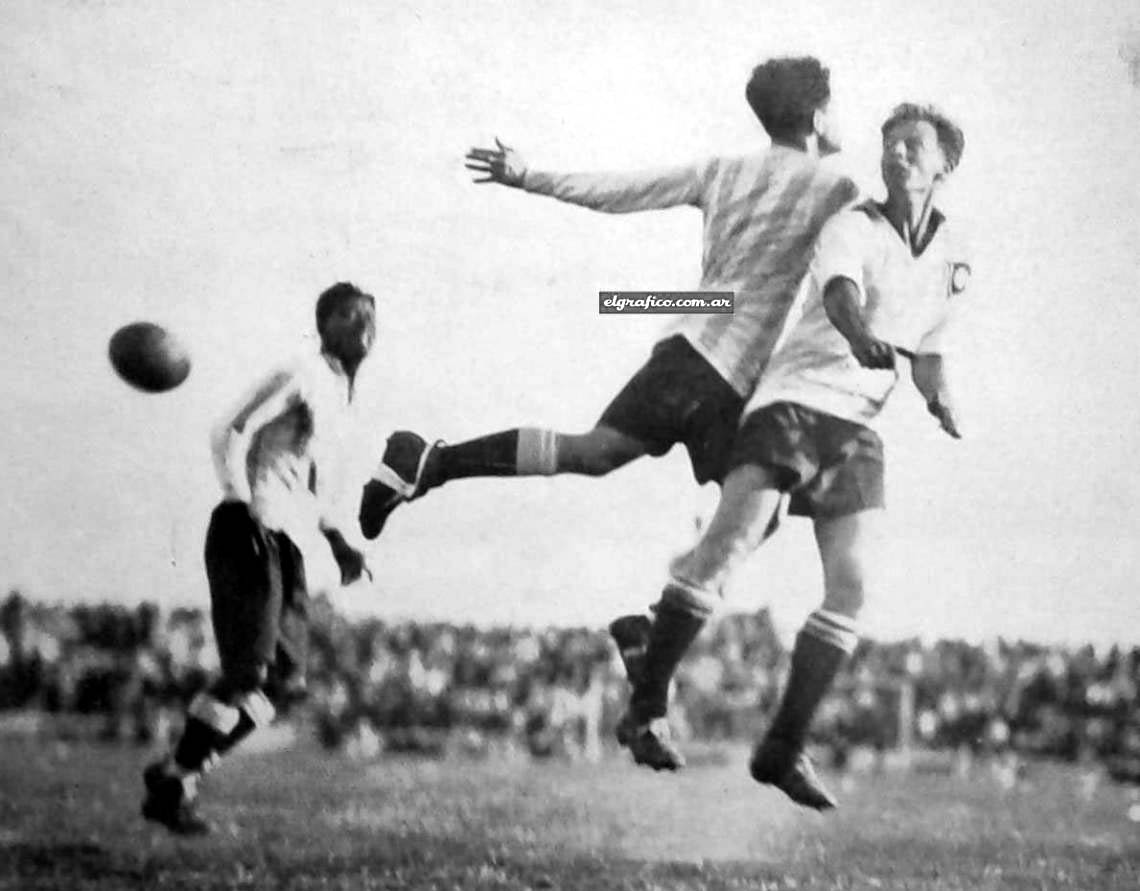
Carlos Nascimento and Argentine Juan Bianchi jumping for the ball at 1925 South American Championship final

For the 1925 Copa América, Argentina and Brazil faced each other in the final match at Sportivo Barracas Stadium, on Christmas Day, drawing a crowd of more than 30,000 people. After 27 minutes, Lagarto intercepted a back pass by Ludovico Bidoglio and passed the ball to Arthur Friedenreich, who then managed to outmanoeuvre the Argentine goalie Américo Tesoriere with a strong shot, making it 1–0 to Brazil. Three minutes later, Nilo scored the second goal for the canarinha, to the crowd's astonishment: if the Brazilian lead was maintained, a new match would have to be played in order to determine the champion.

Before the end of the first half, a dangerous Brazilian counterattack was brought to a halt by Ramón Muttis with a heavy foul inflicted on Friedenreich, who in turn reacted by kicking the player. After the Argentine responded with a punch to the Brazilian's face, a full-blown brawl ensued, involving several players and even some spectators who invaded the pitch. Consequently, the game was soon suspended, only being resumed - without any dismissals - after a hug between Friedenreich and Muttis sealed a truce between the teams.

After resuming, the match underwent a major change in course: by the end of the first half, Argentine player Antonio Cerrotti had narrowed the gap and opened the path to recovery. Then came the equaliser, ten minutes into the second half, scored by Manuel Seoane. After no more goals from either side, the match would end in a tied 2–2, granting Argentina their second victory in the Copa América. In Brazil, news of the match and its violent incident would be run by some local newspapers, who referred to the game as 'The Barracas' War'.

Because of this event, Argentina and Brazil would refrain from officially playing against each other for 11 years.

=== 1937 Copa América final ===
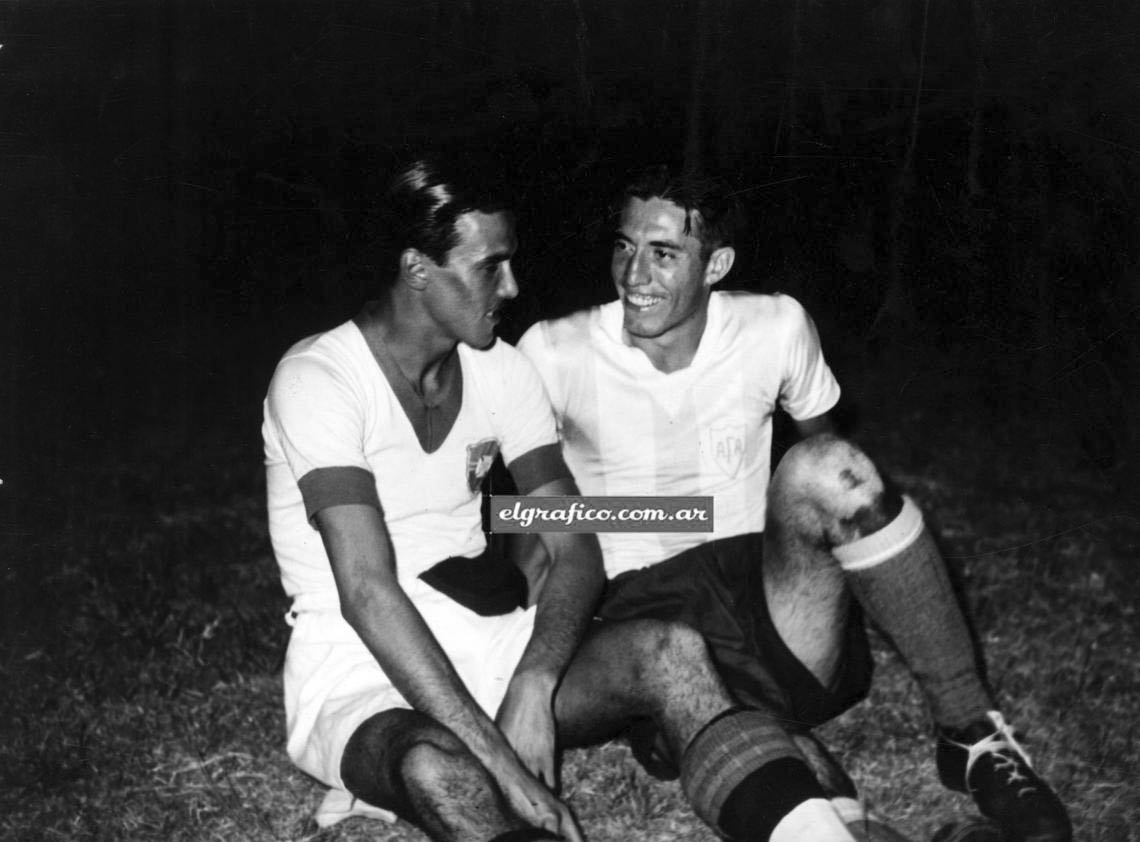
Cardeal (left) and Celestino Martínez during the 1937 match

By the 1937 South American Championship (now Copa América), the rivalry between both teams had already become a matter of national pride. There often were verbal confrontations between both parties, wherein Argentine fans often taunted the Brazilians by calling them macaquitos (Spanish for 'little monkeys') and making monkey sounds. The tournament's final match, held in Buenos Aires, was played between the two teams and by the 90 minutes mark the score was still goalless; the tie would be broken by the Argentinians, who, in overtime, managed to score two goals. Questioning one of the goals validity and fearful for their own safety, the Brazilian players would leave the stadium before the match was officially finished. The Brazilian press would go on to call the match jogo da vergonha (Portuguese for 'the shameful game').

=== 1939 Roca Cup ===
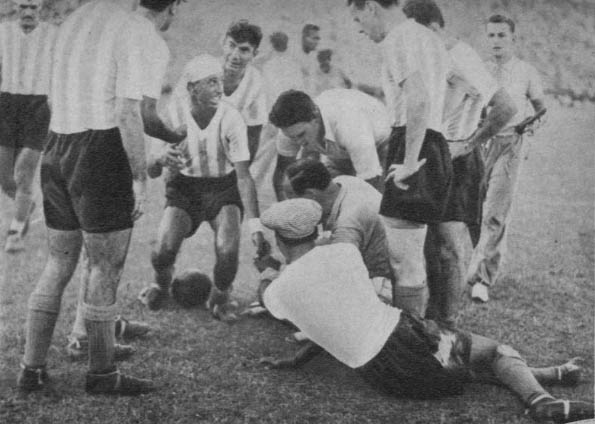
Argentine goalkeeper Sebastián Gualco injured in the second match of the 1939 Copa Roca

The 1939 edition of the Roca Cup – the amicable tournament between Brazil and Argentina – was the longest one in history, only being decided after two extra playoffs, in a total of four matches. The first two games were held in São Januário Stadium in Rio de Janeiro, with the first one ending 5–1 to Argentina, in January 1939.

A second match was held only a week later, with the Brazilian team seeking to avenge the previous defeat. The match was intense: at first, Brazil was ahead at 1–0, then Argentina held the lead at 1–2, with Brazil finally levelling the scores at 2–2. Shortly before the end of the match, the referee (who was the same from the previous game) called a penalty for Brazil. Furious, Argentine player Arcadio López verbally assaulted the referee and had to be escorted out of the pitch by the police. The Argentine team, enraged by the situation, left the pitch in protest. The penalty would grant Brazil a 3–2 victory, which was scored without a goalkeeper, since the entire Argentine team had already abandoned the pitch.

As both teams had each won one match, a playoff game was scheduled at Parque Antárctica in São Paulo. After extra time, the match ended in a 2–2 tie; therefore, a fourth and final match was held in the same venue and won by Argentina 3–0, finally granting them the trophy.

=== 1945-1946 incidents ===
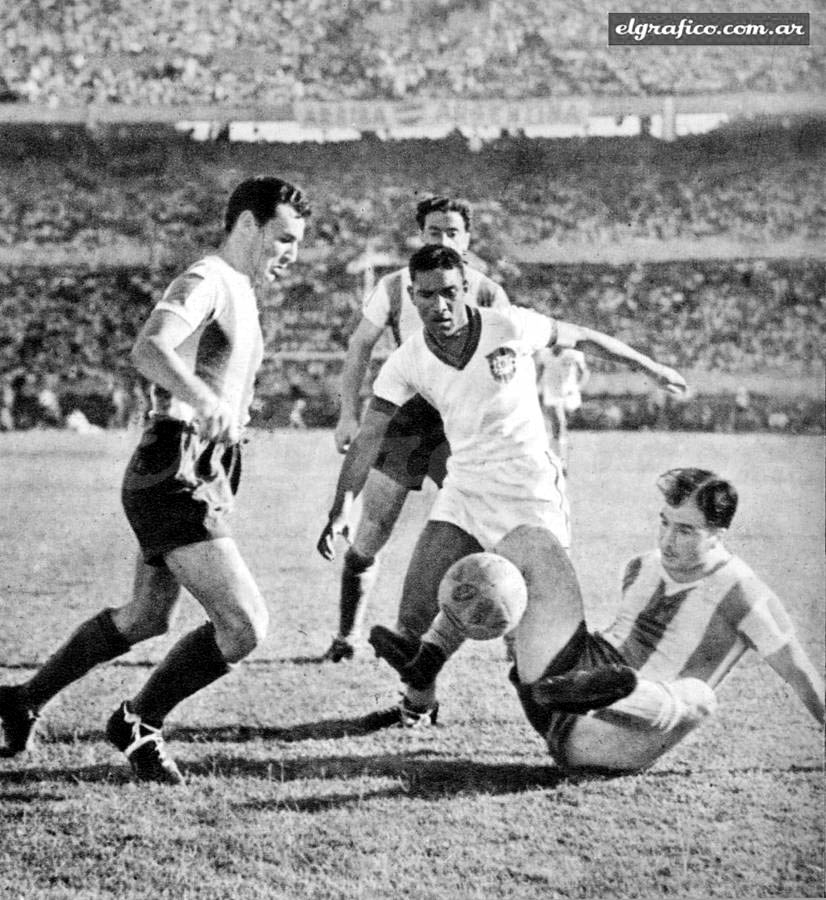
The 1946 South American Championship final, won by Argentina

During a 1945 Roca Cup match won by Brazil 6–2, the young Brazilian player Ademir de Menezes fractured Argentine José Batagliero's leg. Though it seemed to be only an unfortunate accident, both teams reacted by carrying the game on in a rougher and sometimes violent manner.

A few months later, Argentina and Brazil would again face each other in the final match for the 1946 South American Championship. Widespread media coverage at the time held the conviction that it would be a rough match. Twenty-eight minutes in, while heading for a free ball, Brazilian Jair da Rosa Pinto fractured Argentine captain José Salomón's tibia and fibula. General disorder ensued, with Argentine and Brazilian players fighting each other on the pitch as the mounted police unit on-site tried to suppress the brawl. After some 500 members of the audience invaded the pitch, both teams retreated to their dressing rooms. After eventually subduing the affray, the game was allowed to continue and Argentina would go on to win the match 2–0. After the incident, Salomón never completely recovered from the injury and would never play professional football again.

=== 1974 FIFA World Cup ===
The event would mark the first-ever meeting between both countries in the FIFA World Cup. Brazil, who'd previously won the 1970 World Cup, would face Argentina in West Germany's Niedersachsenstadion, in Hanover, for the tournament's second round, as both teams were placed in Group A. Ultimately, the game was won 2–1 by Brazil, with goals from Rivellino and Jairzinho, whereas Brindisi scored the only goal for Argentina.

=== 1978 FIFA World Cup ===
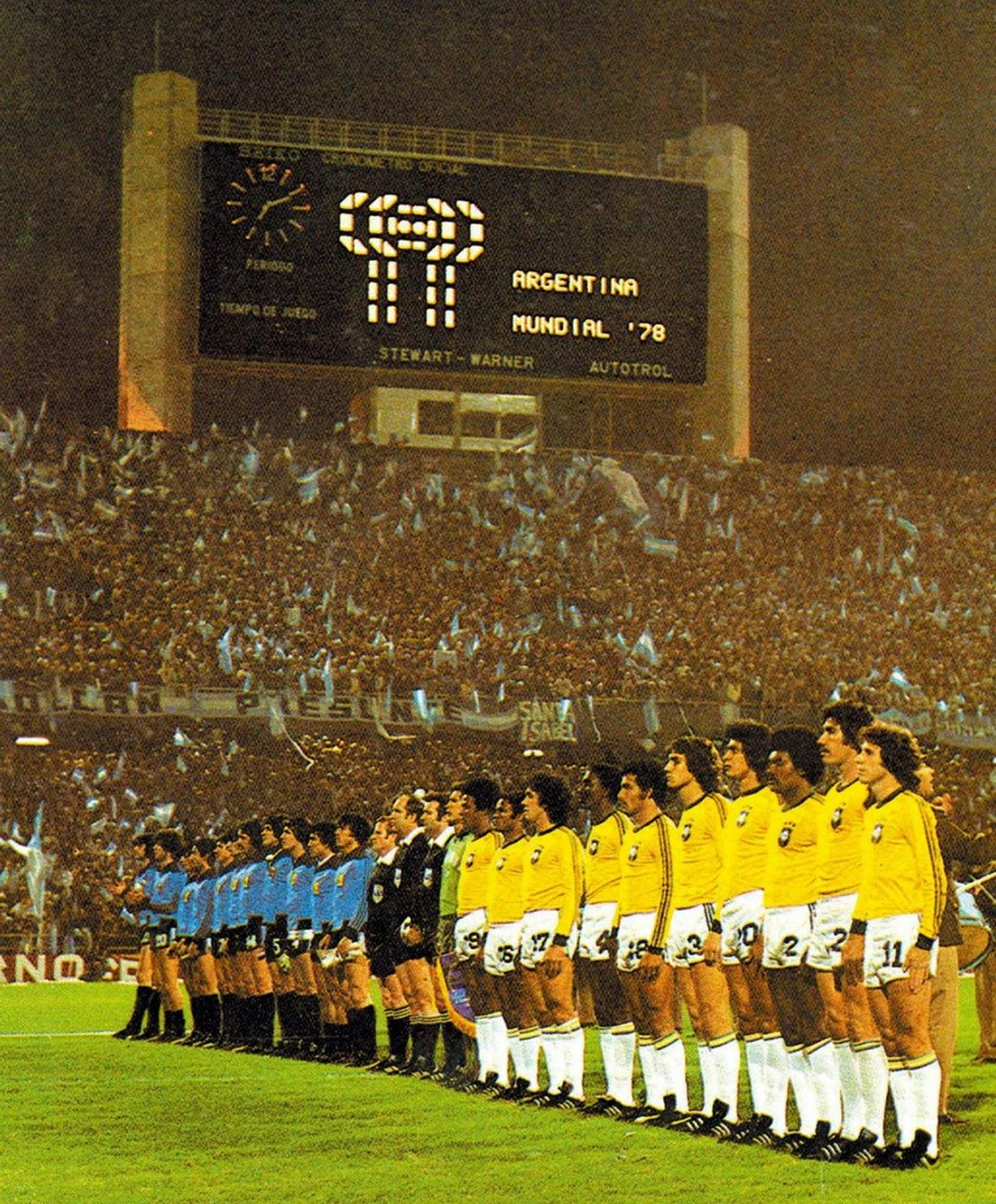
Argentine and Brazilian teams before their match in the 1978 World Cup

For the second group stage of the tournament, Group B was essentially a battle between Argentina and Brazil, which was resolved in controversial circumstances. In the first stage, Brazil beat Peru 3–0 while Argentina saw off Poland 2–0. Brazil and Argentina then played out a tense and violent goalless draw – which became known as A Batalha de Rosário (Portuguese for 'the Battle of Rosario') – thus granting both teams three points by the last round of games; despite the draw, Argentina would hold an advantage over Brazil insofar as their match against Peru kicked off several hours after Brazil's match with Poland.

With Brazil having won their match 3–1, the Argentines knew that they had to beat Peru by four clear goals to go through to the final. The team would manage to do so with what some considered a suspicious degree of ease: trailing 2–0 at half-time, Peru's efforts simply collapsed in the second half of the game, allowing Argentina to win 6–0. Rumours had it that Peru might have been illicitly induced not to try too hard, a notion that was especially inflamed due to the fact that the Peruvian goalkeeper, Ramón Quiroga, was born in Argentina). Nevertheless, no foul play was ever proved, and Argentina met the Netherlands in the final.

Having been denied a final place by Argentina's 6–0 win over Peru, Brazil would place third after facing Italy and the two were dubbed "moral champions" by coach Cláudio Coutinho, since, despite not ultimately winning the tournament, they did not lose a single match.

=== 1982 FIFA World Cup ===
For the tournament's second group stage, Brazil and Argentina were grouped together (along with Italy) in Group C, which was dubbed the "group of death". In the opener, Italy prevailed 2–1 over Argentina, who then needed a win over Brazil on the second day. However, the Brazilians' attacking game, characterised by nimble one-touch passing on-the-run, ultimately managed to outmatch the Argentine team, in a final score of 3–1. Frustrated with the outcome, Diego Maradona kicked Brazilian player Batista, for which he received a straight red card. Brazil would go on to lose their next game to Italy and thus exited the World Cup along with Argentina.

=== 1990 FIFA World Cup and the "holy water" scandal ===
The teams met in the last 16 round of the 1990 FIFA World Cup. Argentina defeated Brazil 1–0 with a goal from Claudio Caniggia, after a pass from Diego Maradona. However, the match would come to a controversial ending, with Brazilian player Branco accusing the Argentine training staff of giving him a bottle of water laced with tranquilisers while they were tending to an injured player. Years later, Maradona stated on an Argentine television show that Branco had been given "holy water". Both the Argentine Football Association and the team's coach at the time, Carlos Bilardo, denied that the "holy water" incident ever took place, though Bilardo had previously said of Branco's allegation: "I'm not saying it didn't happen."

=== 1991 Copa América ===
Argentina defeated Brazil 3–2 in Santiago in the first match of the final pool. Five players were sent off: Claudio Caniggia and Mazinho Oliveira after tangling in the 31st minute; Carlos Enrique and Márcio Roberto dos Santos for a fight in the 61st minute, that sent one player out on a stretcher; and Careca Bianchezi in the 80th minute, two minutes after coming on as a substitute.

=== 1993 Copa América ===
Argentina and Brazil tied 1–1 in the quarter-final match, played in Guayaquil: Brazil initially took the lead, but Leonardo Rodríguez brought about the draw in the second half with a header after a corner kick. For the shoot-out, Argentina defeated Brazil 6–5 after Marco Antônio Boiadeiro missed the final spot kick for Brazil, getting the team through to the semi-finals. Argentina would go on to win that year's Copa América title after defeating Mexico in the final.

=== 1995 Copa América ===
Held in Uruguay, the two nations met at the quarter-finals stage on 17 July 1995. The Brazilian player Túlio Maravilha became famous for scoring a late equalizer five minutes from cut-off after controlling the ball with his left arm, an illegal move according to the game's regulations. Despite the obvious foul, the referee, Alberto Tejada Noriega of Peru, claimed he did not see the incident and the goal wasn't nullified. The game finished with a 2–2 draw and Brazil went on to win on penalties. The Argentine media labelled the incident as the "hand of the devil", a reference to the controversial goal scored by Diego Maradona in the 1986 FIFA World Cup against England.

=== 2004 Copa América ===
In the final match of the tournament, Argentina was winning 2–1 over Brazil, but Adriano scored a goal in the last minute of the match, taking it to penalties. Brazil would win the shoot-out with Júlio César stopping a shot from Andrés D'Alessandro.

=== 2005 FIFA Confederations Cup ===
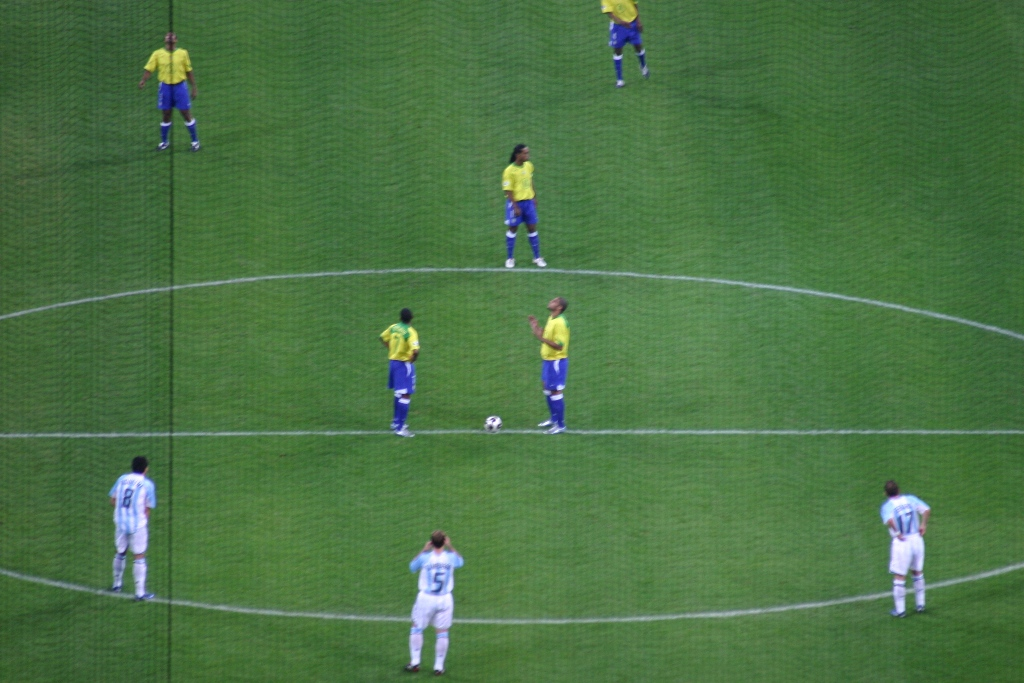
Argentina and Brazil clash at the 2005 FIFA Confederations Cup final.

In 2005, Brazil and Argentina participated in the 2005 FIFA Confederations Cup. Brazil had qualified for the competition as the reigning World Cup champion at the time. However, since Brazil had also won the 2004 Copa América, runners-up Argentina was allowed to participate in the tournament to take up the vacated qualifier berth. In the semi-finals, Brazil eliminated hosting nation Germany, while Argentina eliminated Mexico, making it so that this competition marked the first time ever the two rivals met in the final game of a tournament sponsored by FIFA. The Brazilians would end up winning the match, outscoring the Argentines 4–1. Adriano scored twice for Brazil, along with Kaká and Ronaldinho, while Pablo Aimar scored Argentina's only goal.

=== 2007 Copa América ===
Brazil defeated Argentina 3–0 in Maracaibo, Venezuela, in the final. The goals were scored by Júlio Baptista, an own goal by Roberto Ayala, and Dani Alves.

=== 2008 Summer Olympics ===
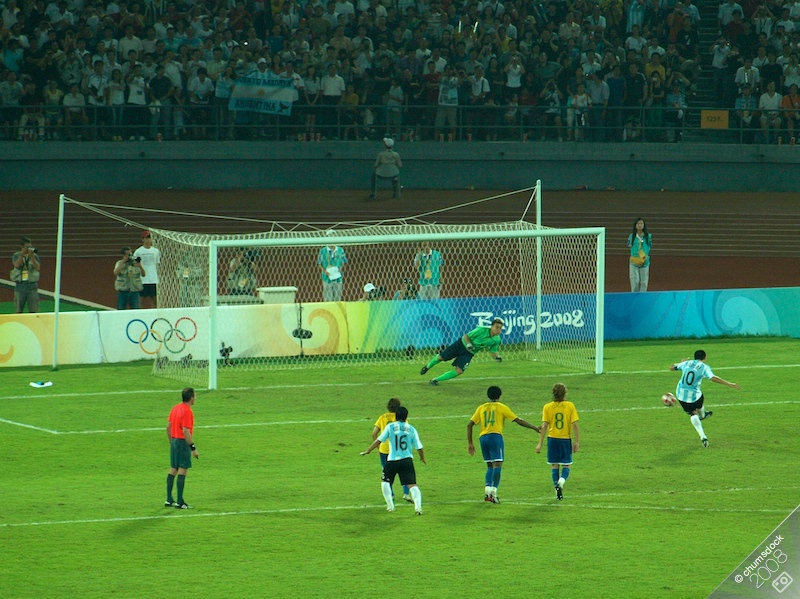
Juan Román Riquelme scores Argentina's third and final goal against Brazil in Beijing 2008, following Sergio Agüero's brace.

Argentina and Brazil met on 19 August in the semi-final match of the football event. The game was described as a tête-à-tête between Lionel Messi and Ronaldinho, two FC Barcelona teammates. The game was recognized as a hard-fought clash between two historic rivals, marred by numerous fouls and two red cards for Brazil. Argentina would end up winning 3–0, and went on to beat Nigeria 1–0 in the final, being the first nation to obtain two consecutive gold medals in football in 40 years, and the third overall after the United Kingdom and Uruguay.

=== 2019 Copa América ===
Brazil and Argentina met at the semi-final match for the 2019 Copa América, which was hosted in Brazil. Brazil defeated Argentina 2–0 with goals by Gabriel Jesus and Roberto Firmino. Argentina eventually placed third and Brazil went on to win their 9th Copa América title.

=== 2021 Copa América ===
The 2021 Copa América was originally scheduled to be jointly held in Colombia and Argentina in 2020, but it was postponed to 2021 due to the COVID-19 pandemic. The event's organizers eventually removed both Argentina and Colombia from hosting the tournament, due to social unrest in Colombia and the COVID-19 pandemic in Argentina. Consequently, Brazil was chosen to host the tournament instead. In the final, Argentina defeated Brazil 1–0 at the Maracanã Stadium with a goal scored by Ángel Di María, winning their 15th Copa América title, the first one in 28 years.

=== 2026 World Cup qualifiers ===
On 22 November 2023, Argentina once again defeated Brazil 1–0 at the Maracanã in a 2026 FIFA World Cup qualifier that was delayed due to crowd violence. It was the first time in history that Brazil was defeated at home in a FIFA World Cup qualification match after an uninterrupted run of 51 wins and 13 draws.

On 25 March 2025, Argentina defeated Brazil 4-1 again, this time at the Mâs Monumental in another 2026 FIFA World Cup qualifier, where Argentina became the first South American team to qualify for the 2026 event. It was the first time Argentina beat Brazil by such a margin since the 60's. It was also Brazil's first back to back defeat in a FIFA World Cup qualifier. The loss would lead the Brazilian football association to fire coach Dorival Júnior a few days later.

== Pelé–Maradona rivalry ==
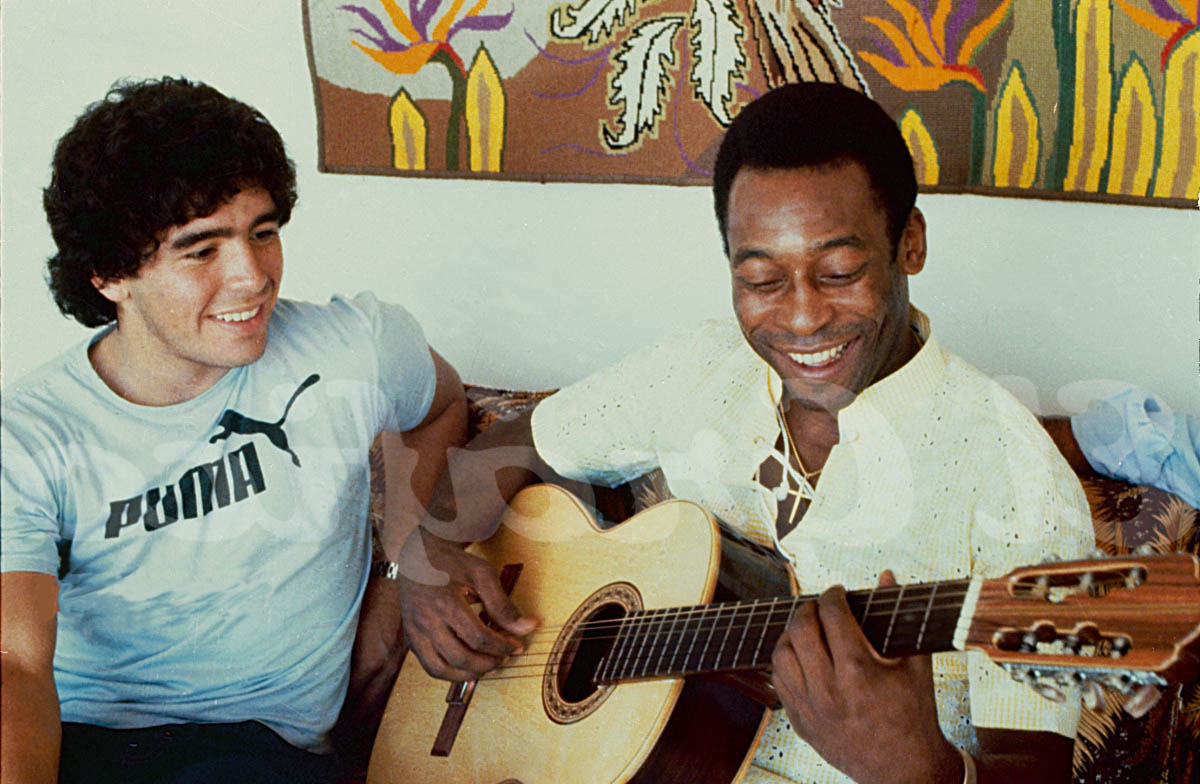
Diego Maradona and Pelé during a meeting arranged by the Argentine magazine El Gráfico, April 1979

Among the elite group of players football fans consider as contenders for the title of best player of all time, Brazil's Pelé and Argentina's Diego Maradona often figure as the most famous. Some of their countrymen are also regularly featured as other possible contenders: the next most notable candidates are perhaps Garrincha (Brazil), Lionel Messi (Argentina), and Alfredo Di Stéfano (Argentina). The most dominant figures from the two countries in the modern game of football are Neymar (Brazilian) and Messi, who both played for F.C. Barcelona and Paris Saint-Germain F.C.. Both Pelé and Maradona have nominated these players as their respective "successors".

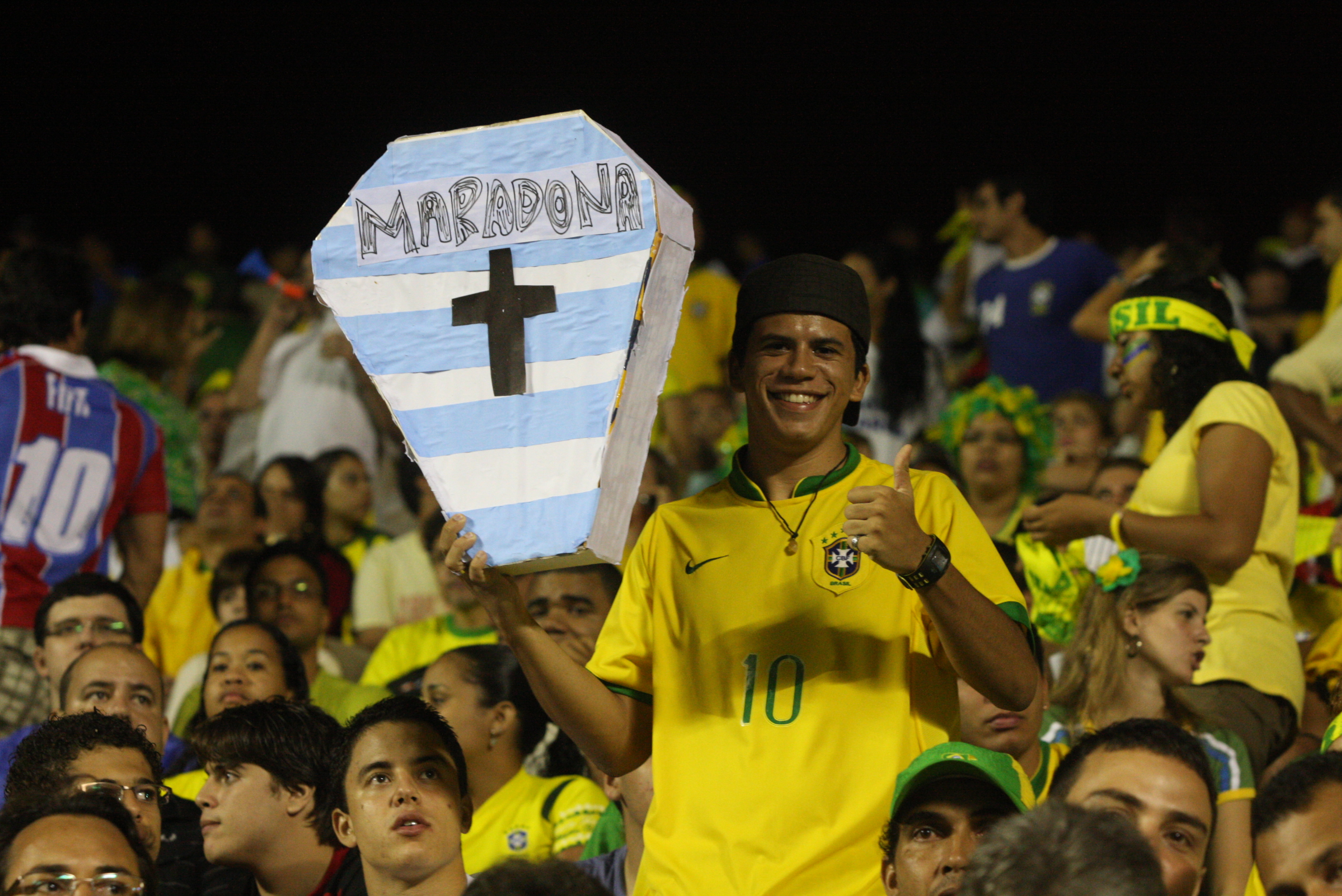
Brazilian fan with a fake coffin with the colors of the Argentine flag and the name "Maradona" in 2009

Nevertheless, the overall discussion around whether Pelé is better than Maradona or vice versa has insofar proved to be a never-ending, contentious dispute. Many consider a direct comparison between the players to be ultimately useless, as both players were respectively active during distinct eras and in different leagues. The debate between the pair has been described as "the rivalry of their countries in microcosm".

In regards to third-party recognitions, Pelé was given the title "Athlete of the Century" by the International Olympic Committee. In 1999, Time magazine named Pelé one of the 100 Most Important People of the 20th Century. He was also elected Football Player of the Century by France's Football Golden Ball Winners, in 1999, as well as Football Player of the Century and South America Football Player of the Century by the International Federation of Football History & Statistics (IFFHS). For his part, Maradona has been named Best Player of the 20th Century by the Globe Soccer Awards and the best soccer player in World Cup history by The Times, while FourFourTwo regarded him as the Best Football Player of All Time. He was also elected as the Greatest Athlete in History by Corriere Dello Sport – Stadio.

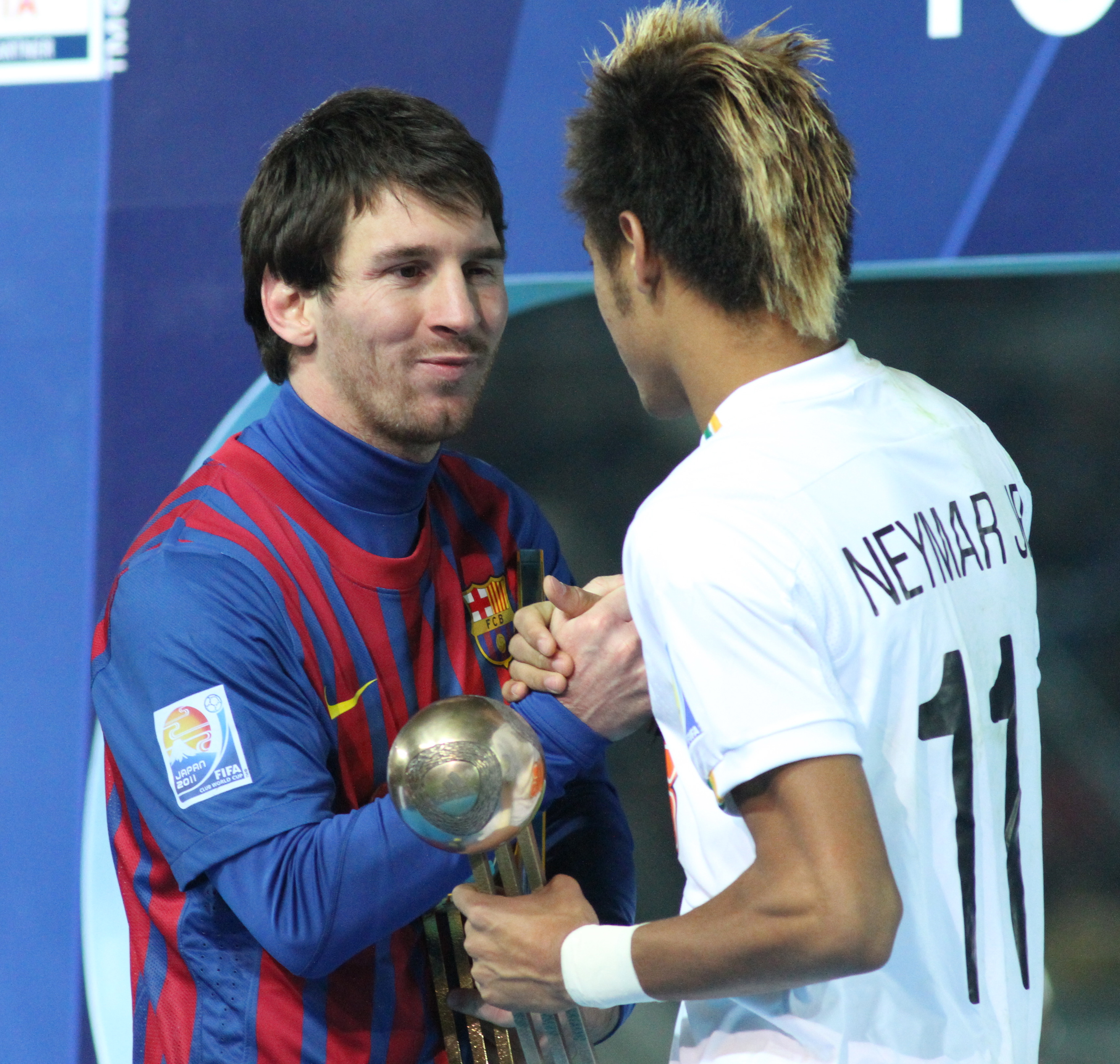
Argentine Lionel Messi and Brazilian Neymar, teammates at Barcelona and PSG, have been described by Pelé and Maradona as their "successors"

The feud would reach a climax during the FIFA Player of the Century award in 2000, for which Maradona was voted Player of the Century in an official internet poll, garnering 53.6% of the votes against 18.53% for Pelé. Shortly before the ceremony, FIFA decided to add a second award and appointed a "Football Family" committee composed of football journalists that gave Pelé the title of The Best Player of the Century, making it a draw. This move was criticized in Argentina, where it was suspected that Pelé was rewarded due to his constant support of FIFA, in contrast to Maradona's frequent criticism of the federation. Others believed that FIFA weighed in other issues besides strictly professional merit in football, such as contentious Maradona's drug usage. In the ceremony, Maradona left right after receiving his award and just before Pelé was given his.

In another internet poll that took place in 2002, Maradona received another award from FIFA, as one of his goals was selected as the World Cup Goal of the Century. One of Pelé's goals received third place, while Maradona had a second goal selected as fourth.

Despite their frequent confrontations, usually through references in the media, Pelé was a guest star in Maradona's TV show La Noche del 10 (Spanish for 'the Night of the #10'), where they had a friendly chat and played a bout of headers. The two players also showed great respect for each other despite their differences, such as when Pelé stated in 2018 that Maradona was better than Messi, or in 2019 when Maradona prayed for Pelé to recover after the Brazilian legend was admitted to hospital for health complications. When Maradona died on 25 November 2020, Pelé was among the major football figures to mourn Maradona's death.

== Statistics ==
=== Major official titles comparison ===
As of 13 April 2025

Senior titles	Argentina	Brazil
FIFA World Cup	3	5
FIFA Confederations Cup	1	4
Copa América	16	9
Panamerican Championship	1	2
CONMEBOL–UEFA Cup of Champions	2	0
Total senior titles	23	20
Youth titles	Argentina	Brazil
Summer Olympics	2	2
Pan American Games	7	5
South American Games	2	0
CONMEBOL Pre-Olympic Tournament	5	7
FIFA U-20 World Cup	6	5
FIFA U-17 World Cup	0	4
South American U-20 Championship	5	13
South American U-17 Championship	4	14
South American U-15 Championship	1	5
Total youth titles	32	55
Grand total	55	75

== List of matches ==
Complete list of matches between both sides:

Note: Matches held before 1914 (Note: The Brazilian Football Confederation was established in 1914) are not recognized by FIFA, thus the Federation states that Brazilian squads formed before that point in time were not official representatives of the country.

Before 1914, Argentina had toured Brazil twice, the first time in 1908, returning in 1912.

=== Recognized matches according to both sides ===
#	Date	City	Venue	Winner	Score	Competition	Goals (ARG)	Goals (BRA)	AFA	CBF	References
1	20 September 1914	Buenos Aires	GEBA	Argentina	3–0	Friendly	Izaguirre (2), Molfino		✓	✓	
2	27 September 1914	Buenos Aires	GEBA	Brazil	1–0	Roca Cup		Salles	✓	✓	
3	10 July 1916	Buenos Aires	GEBA	Draw	1–1	1916 Sudamericano	Laguna	Alencar	✓	✓	
4	3 October 1917	Montevideo	Parque Pereira	Argentina	4–2	1917 Sudamericano	Calomino, Ohaco (2), Blanco	Neco, S. Lagreca	✓	✓	
5	18 May 1919	Rio de Janeiro	Laranjeiras	Brazil	3–1	1919 Sudamericano	Izaguirre	Heitor, Amílcar, Millon	✓	✓	
6	1 June 1919	Rio de Janeiro	Laranjeiras	Draw	3–3	Copa Roberto Chery	Clarke, Mattozzi, Laiolo	Arlindo (2), Haroldo	✓	✓	
7	25 September 1920	Viña del Mar	Valparaíso SC	Argentina	2–0	1920 Sudamericano	Echeverría, Libonatti		✓	✓	
8 (Note: 6 October 1920 (Argentina 3–1 Brazil): many sources say it was not a "Class A match" because it was played with eight players each. Elo Ratings counts it as official)	6 October 1920	Buenos Aires	Sp. Barracas	Argentina	3–1	Friendly	Echeverría (2), Lucarelli	Castelhano	✗	✗	
9	2 October 1921	Buenos Aires	Sp. Barracas	Argentina	1–0	1921 Sudamericano	Libonatti		✓	✓	
10	15 October 1922	Rio de Janeiro	Laranjeiras	Brazil	2–0	1922 Sudamericano		Neco, Amílcar (p)	✓	✓	
11 (Note: 22 October 1922 (Brazil 2–1 Argentina): many sources say it was not a "Class A match" because Brazil played with their "B" team. The Brazilian "A" team played the same day the 1922 Copa America final vs. Paraguay.)	22 October 1922	São Paulo	Parque Antártica	Brazil	2–1	Roca Cup	Francia	Brasileiro, Gambarotta	✗	✓	
12	18 November 1923	Montevideo	Parque Central	Argentina	2–1	1923 Sudamericano	Onzari, Saluppo	Nilo	✓	✓	
13 (Note: 2 December 1923 (Argentina 0–2 Brazil, Copa Confraternidad): many sources say it was not a "Class A match" because Argentina did not play with its "A" team. The Argentine "A" team played in the same day the decisive game against Uruguay in the 1923 Copa América.)	2 December 1923	Buenos Aires	Sp. Barracas	Brazil	2–0	Copa Confraternidad		Nilo, Zezé	✗	✓	
14	9 December 1923	Buenos Aires	Sp. Barracas	Argentina	2–0	Roca Cup	Dino (og), Onzari		✓	✓	
15	13 December 1925	Buenos Aires	Sp. Barracas	Argentina	4–1	1925 Sudamericano	Seoane (3), Garasini	Nilo	✓	✓	
16	25 December 1925	Buenos Aires	Boca Juniors	Draw	2–2	1925 Sudamericano	Cerroti, Seoane	Friedenreich, Nilo	✓	✓	
17	30 January 1937	Buenos Aires	Gasómetro	Argentina	1–0	1937 Sudamericano	E. García		✓	✓	
18	1 February 1937	Buenos Aires	Gasómetro	Argentina	2–0	1937 Sudamericano	De la Mata (2)		✓	✓	
19	15 January 1939	Rio de Janeiro	São Januário	Argentina	5–1	Roca Cup	E. García, Masantonio (2), Moreno (2)	Leônidas	✓	✓	
20	22 January 1939	Rio de Janeiro	São Januário	Brazil	3–2	Roca Cup	Rodolfi, E. García	Leônidas, Adílson, Perácio (p.)	✓	✓	
21	18 February 1940	São Paulo	Parque Antártica	Draw	2–2	Roca Cup	Cassan, Baldonedo	Leônidas (2)	✓	✓	
22	25 February 1940	São Paulo	Parque Antártica	Argentina	3–0	Roca Cup	Baldonedo, Fidel, Sastre		✓	✓	
23	5 March 1940	Buenos Aires	Gasómetro	Argentina	6–1	Roca Cup	Masantonio (2), Peucelle (3), Baldonedo	Jair	✓	✓	
24	10 March 1940	Buenos Aires	Gasómetro	Brazil	3–2	Roca Cup	Baldonedo (2)	Hércules (2), Leônidas	✓	✓	
25	17 March 1940	Avellaneda	Independiente	Argentina	5–1	Roca Cup	Baldonedo, Masantonio (2), Peucelle, Cassan	Leônidas	✓	✓	
26	17 January 1942	Montevideo	Centenario	Argentina	2–1	1942 Sudamericano	E. García, Masantonio	Servílio Sr.	✓	✓	
27	16 February 1945	Santiago	Nacional	Argentina	3–1	1945 Sudamericano	N. Méndez	Ademir	✓	✓	
28	16 December 1945	São Paulo	Pacaembu	Argentina	4–3	Roca Cup	Pedernera, Boyé, Sued, Labruna	Salomón (og), Zizinho, Ademir	✓	✓	
29	20 December 1945	Rio de Janeiro	São Januário	Brazil	6–2	Roca Cup	Pedernera, Martino	Ademir (2), Leônidas (p.), Zizinho, Chico, Heleno de Freitas	✓	✓	
30	23 December 1945	Rio de Janeiro	São Januário	Brazil	3–1	Roca Cup	Martino	Heleno de Freitas, E. Lima, Fonda (o.g.)	✓	✓	
31	10 February 1946	Buenos Aires	Monumental	Argentina	2–0	1946 Sudamericano	N. Méndez (2)		✓	✓	
32	5 February 1956	Montevideo	Centenario	Brazil	1–0	1956 Sudamericano		Luizinho	✓	✓	
33	18 March 1956	Mexico D.F.	Estadio Olímpico Universitario	Draw	2–2	1956 Panamerican	Yudica, Sívori	Chinesinho, Ênio Andrade	✓	✓	
34	8 July 1956	Avellaneda	Racing	Draw	0–0	Taça do Atlântico			✓	✓	
35 (Note: 5 December 1956 (Brazil 1–2 Argentina, Copa Colombo): Many sources say it was not a "Class A match". Brazil did not play with its first national team; it was a Guanabara State Selection. Rsssf.com and Elo Ratings count it as official)	5 December 1956	Rio de Janeiro	Maracaná	Argentina	2-1	Copa Raúl Colombo	Sanfilippo, Garabal	Índio	✗	✗	
36	3 April 1957	Lima	Nacional	Argentina	3–0	1957 Sudamericano	Angelillo, Maschio, Cruz		✓	✓	
37	7 July 1957	Rio de Janeiro	Maracanã	Argentina	2–1	Roca Cup	Labruna, Juárez	Pelé	✓	✓	
38	10 July 1957	São Paulo	Pacaembu	Brazil	2–0	Roca Cup		Pelé, Mazzola	✓	✓	
39	4 April 1959	Buenos Aires	Monumental	Draw	1–1	1959 Sudamericano (A)	Pizzuti	Pelé	✓	✓	
40	22 December 1959	Guayaquil	Modelo	Argentina	4–1	1959 Sudamericano (E)	O.H. García, Sanfilippo (3)	Geraldo	✓	✓	
41	13 March 1960	San José	Nacional	Argentina	2–1	1960 Panamerican	Belén, Nardiello	Juarez	✓	✓	
42	20 March 1960	San José	Nacional	Brazil	1–0	1960 Panamerican		Kuelle	✓	✓	
43	26 May 1960	Buenos Aires	Monumental	Argentina	4–2	Roca Cup	Nardiello (2), D'Ascenzo, Belén	Djalma Santos, Delém	✓	✓	
44	29 May 1960	Buenos Aires	Monumental	Brazil	4–1	Roca Cup	R. Sosa	Delém, Julinho, Servílio Jr.	✓	✓	
45	12 July 1960	Rio de Janeiro	Maracanã	Brazil	5–1	Taça do Atlântico	R. Sosa	Chinesinho, Pelé, Pepe (2), Delém	✓	✓	
46	24 March 1963	La Paz	Hernando Siles	Argentina	3–0	1963 Sudamericano	M. Rodríguez, Savoy, Juárez		✓	✓	
47	13 April 1963	São Paulo	Morumbi	Argentina	3–2	Roca Cup	Lallana (2), Juárez	Pepe (2)	✓	✓	
48	16 April 1963	Rio de Janeiro	Maracanã	Brazil	5–2	Roca Cup	Fernández, Savoy	Pelé (3), Amarildo (2)	✓	✓	
49	3 June 1964	São Paulo	Pacaembu	Argentina	3–0	Taça das Nações	E. Onega, Telch (2)		✓	✓	
50	9 June 1965	Rio de Janeiro	Maracanã	Draw	0–0	Friendly			✓	✓	
51 (Note: 7 August 1968 (Brazil 4–1 Argentina): Many sources say it was not a "Class A match". Brazil did not play with its first national team; it was a Rio de Janeiro State Selection. A source of Rsssf.com and Elo Ratings count it as official)	7 August 1968	Rio de Janeiro	Maracanã	Brazil	4–1	Friendly	Basile	Valtencir, R. Miranda, Jairzinho, Caju	✗	✓	
52 (Note: 11 August 1968 (Brazil 3–2 Argentina): Many sources say it was not a "Class A match". Brazil did not play with its first national team; it was a Minas Gerais State Selection. A source of Rsssf.com and Elo Ratings count it as official)	11 August 1968	Belo Horizonte	Mineirão	Brazil	3–2	Friendly	Rendo, Silva	Evaldo, Rodrigues, Dirceu	✗	✓	
53	4 March 1970	Porto Alegre	Beira-Rio	Argentina	2–0	Friendly	Mas, Conigliaro		✓	✓	
54	8 March 1970	Rio de Janeiro	Maracanã	Brazil	2–1	Friendly	Brindisi	Pelé, Jairzinho	✓	✓	
55	28 July 1971	Buenos Aires	Monumental	Draw	1–1	Roca Cup	Madurga	Caju	✓	✓	
56	31 July 1971	Buenos Aires	Monumental	Draw	2–2	Roca Cup	Fischer (2)	Tostão, Caju	✓	✓	
57	30 June 1974	Hannover	Niedersachsenstadion	Brazil	2–1	1974 World Cup	Brindisi	Rivellino, Jairzinho	✓	✓	
58	6 August 1975	Belo Horizonte	Mineirão	Brazil	1–2	1975 Copa América	Asad	Nelinho (2)	✓	✓	
59	16 August 1975	Rosario	Gigante Arroyito	Brazil	1–0	1975 Copa América		Danival	✓	✓	
60	27 February 1976	Buenos Aires	Monumental	Brazil	2–1	Taça do Atlântico + Roca Cup	Kempes	Lula, Zico	✓	✓	
61	19 May 1976	Río de Janeiro	Maracanã	Brazil	2–0	Taça do Atlântico + Roca Cup		Lula, Neca	✓	✓	
62	18 June 1978	Rosario	Gigante Arroyito	Draw	0–0	1978 World Cup			✓	✓	
63	2 August 1979	Río de Janeiro	Maracanã	Brazil	2–1	1979 Copa América	Coscia	Zico, Tita	✓	✓	
64	23 August 1979	Buenos Aires	Monumental	Draw	2–2	1979 Copa América	Passarella, R. Díaz	Sócrates (2)	✓	✓	
65	4 January 1981	Montevideo	Centenario	Draw	1–1	Mundialito	Maradona	Edevaldo	✓	✓	
66	2 June 1982	Barcelona	Sarrià	Brazil	3–1	1982 World Cup	R. Díaz	Zico, Serginho, Júnior	✓	✓	
67	24 August 1983	Buenos Aires	Monumental	Argentina	1–0	1983 Copa América	Gareca		✓	✓	
68	14 September 1983	Rio de Janeiro	Maracanã	Draw	0–0	1983 Copa América			✓	✓	
69	17 June 1984	São Paulo	Morumbi	Draw	0–0	Friendly			✓	✓	
70	5 May 1985	Salvador	Fonte Nova	Brazil	2–1	Friendly	Burruchaga	Careca, Alemão	✓	✓	
71	10 July 1988	Melbourne	Olympic Park	Draw	0–0	Australia Bicentenary Gold Cup			✓	✓	
72	12 July 1989	Rio de Janeiro	Maracanã	Brazil	2–0	1989 Copa América		Bebeto, Romário	✓	✓	
73	24 June 1990	Turin	delle Alpi	Argentina	1–0	1990 World Cup	Caniggia		✓	✓	
74	27 March 1991	Buenos Aires	José Amalfitani	Draw	3–3	Friendly	Ferreyra, Franco, Bisconti	Renato Gaúcho, Luís Henrique, Careca Bianchezi	✓	✓	
75	27 June 1991	Curitiba	Pinheirão	Draw	1–1	Friendly	Caniggia	Neto	✓	✓	
76	17 July 1991	Santiago	Estadio Nacional	Argentina	3–2	1991 Copa América	Franco (2), Batistuta	Branco, Joao Paulo	✓	✓	
77	18 February 1993	Buenos Aires	Monumental	Draw	1–1	Copa Centenario de la AFA	Mancuso	Luís Henrique	✓	✓	
78	27 June 1993	Guayaquil	Monumental	Draw	1–1	1993 Copa América	L. Rodríguez	Müller	✓	✓	
79	23 March 1994	Recife	Arruda	Brazil	2–0	Friendly		Bebeto (2)	✓	✓	
80	17 July 1995	Rivera	Atilio Paiva	Draw	2–2	1995 Copa América	Balbo, Batistuta	Edmundo, Túlio	✓	✓	
81	8 November 1995	Buenos Aires	Monumental	Brazil	1–0	Copa 50imo Aniversario de Clarín		Donizete	✓	✓	
82	29 April 1998	Rio de Janeiro	Maracanã	Argentina	1–0	Friendly	C. López		✓	✓	
83	11 June 1999	Ciudad del Este	Antonio Aranda	Brazil	2–1	1999 Copa América	Sorín	Rivaldo, Ronaldo	✓	✓	
84	4 September 1999	Buenos Aires	Monumental	Argentina	2–0	Copa ZH 35th Anniversary	Verón, Crespo		✓	✓	
85	7 September 1999	Porto Alegre	Beira-Rio	Brazil	4–2	Copa ZH 35th Anniversary	Ayala, Ortega	Rivaldo (3), Ronaldo	✓	✓	
86	26 July 2000	São Paulo	Morumbi	Brazil	3–1	2002 World Cup qualification	Almeyda	Alex, Vampeta (2)	✓	✓	
87	5 September 2001	Buenos Aires	Monumental	Argentina	2–1	2002 World Cup qualification	Gallardo, Cris (o.g.)	Ayala (o.g.)	✓	✓	
88	2 June 2004	Belo Horizonte	Mineirão	Brazil	3–1	2006 World Cup qualification	Sorín	Ronaldo (3)	✓	✓	
89	25 July 2004	Lima	Estadio Nacional	Draw	2–2	2004 Copa América	K. González, Delgado	Luisão, Adriano	✓	✓	
90	8 June 2005	Buenos Aires	Monumental	Argentina	3–1	2006 World Cup qualification	Crespo (2), Riquelme	R. Carlos	✓	✓	
91	29 June 2005	Frankfurt	Waldstadion	Brazil	4–1	2005 FIFA Confederations Cup	Aimar	Adriano (2), Kaká, Ronaldinho	✓	✓	
92	3 September 2006	London	Emirates Stadium	Brazil	3–0	Friendly		Elano (2), Kaká	✓	✓	
93	15 July 2007	Maracaibo	José P. Romero	Brazil	3–0	2007 Copa América		J. Baptista, Ayala (o.g.), Dani Alves	✓	✓	
94	18 June 2008	Belo Horizonte	Mineirão	Draw	0–0	2010 World Cup qualification			✓	✓	
95	5 September 2009	Rosario	Gigante Arroyito	Brazil	3–1	2010 World Cup qualification	Dátolo	Luisão, L. Fabiano (2)	✓	✓	
96	17 November 2010	Doha	Khalifa International	Argentina	1–0	Friendly	Messi		✓	✓	
97	14 September 2011	Córdoba	Mario A. Kempes	Draw	0–0	2011 Superclásico			✓	✓	
98	28 September 2011	Belém	Mangueirão	Brazil	2–0	2011 Superclásico		L. Moura, Neymar	✓	✓	
99	9 June 2012	East Rutherford	MetLife Stadium	Argentina	4–3	Friendly	Messi (3), F. Fernández	Rômulo, Oscar, Hulk	✓	✓	
100	19 September 2012	Goiânia	Serra Dourada	Brazil	2–1	2012 Superclásico	J.M. Martínez	Paulinho, Neymar	✓	✓	
101	21 November 2012	Buenos Aires	La Bombonera	Argentina	2–1	2012 Superclásico	Scocco (2)	Fred	✓	✓	
102	11 October 2014	Beijing	National Stadium	Brazil	2–0	2014 Superclásico		D. Tardelli (2)	✓	✓	
103	13 November 2015	Buenos Aires	Monumental	Draw	1–1	2018 World Cup qualification	Lavezzi	L. Lima	✓	✓	
104	10 November 2016	Belo Horizonte	Mineirão	Brazil	3–0	2018 World Cup qualification		Coutinho, Neymar, Paulinho	✓	✓	
105	9 June 2017	Melbourne	MCG	Argentina	1–0	2017 Superclásico	Mercado		✓	✓	
106	16 October 2018	Jeddah	King Abdullah	Brazil	1–0	2018 Superclásico		Miranda	✓	✓	
107	2 July 2019	Belo Horizonte	Mineirão	Brazil	2–0	2019 Copa América		G. Jesus, Firmino	✓	✓	
108	15 November 2019	Riyadh	King Saud	Argentina	1–0	2019 Superclásico	Messi		✓	✓	
109	10 July 2021	Rio de Janeiro	Maracanã	Argentina	1–0	2021 Copa América	Di María		✓	✓	
110	16 November 2021	San Juan	Bicentenario	Draw	0–0	2022 World Cup qualification			✓	✓	
111	21 November 2023	Rio de Janeiro	Maracanã	Argentina	1–0	2026 World Cup qualification	Otamendi		✓	✓	
112	25 March 2025	Buenos Aires	Monumental	Argentina	4–1	2026 World Cup qualification	Alvarez, Fernández, Mac Allister, Simeone	Cunha	✓	✓	

=== Unrecognized matches ===
List of matches played from 1908 to 1914 – before the CBF was established – between the Argentina national team and diverse representatives (named themselves "Brazil"), such as Liga Paulista and Liga Carioca combined, or clubs (Paulistano, SC Americano), among others. It is believed that in the first match held on 2 July 1908, Argentina wore the light blue and white shirt for the first time, although other sources state that the shirt debuted in a Copa Newton match v Uruguay in September that year. In 1913, a Liga Paulista team arrived in Argentina to play two friendly matches there.

#	Date	City	Venue	Winner	Score	Goals (ARG)	Goals (BRA)
1	2 July 1908	São Paulo	Velódromo	(Draw)	2–2	J. Brown, E. Brown	Miller
2	5 July 1908	São Paulo	Velódromo	Argentina	6–0	Susán, E. Brown (3), A. Brown (2)	
3	7 July 1908	São Paulo	Velódromo	Argentina	4–0	Dickinson, Susán, A. Brown, E.A. Brown	
4	9 July 1908	Rio de Janeiro	Laranjeiras	Argentina	3–2	V. Etchegaray (o.g.), Dickinson, Burgos	Sampaio, E. Etchegaray (p.)
5	11 July 1908	Rio de Janeiro	Laranjeiras	Argentina	7–1	Robinson (o.g.), E.A. Brown (2), Burgos, E. Brown (2), Susán	Monk
6	12 July 1908	Rio de Janeiro	Laranjeiras	Argentina	3–0	E.A. Brown (3)	
7	14 July 1908	Santos	Liga Santista	Argentina	6–1	E.A. Brown (2), Susán (2), E. Brown (2)	Colston
8	4 September 1912	São Paulo	Velódromo	Brazil	4–3	Hayes (3)	Mariano, Décio (3)
9	5 September 1912	São Paulo	Velódromo	Argentina	3–0	J.D. Brown (p), E.A. Brown, Viale	
10	7 September 1912	São Paulo	Velódromo	Argentina	6–3	Susán, E.A. Brown (2), Viale, Hayes (2)	J.D. Brown (o.g.), Boyes, Manne
11	8 September 1912	São Paulo	Velódromo	Argentina	6–3	Susán (2), E.A. Brown (3), Hayes	Friedenreich, Malta, Salles
12	12 September 1912	Rio de Janeiro	Laranjeiras	Argentina	4–0	E.A.Brown, Ohaco, Hayes (2)	
13	14 September 1912	Rio de Janeiro	Laranjeiras	Argentina	9–1	(n/d)	Robinson
14	15 September 1912	Rio de Janeiro	Laranjeiras	Argentina	5–0	Hayes (4), Susán	
15	10 August 1913	Avellaneda	Racing	Brazil	2–0		Campos, Décio
16	17 August 1913	Buenos Aires	GEBA	Argentina	2–0	Viale, Susán	

=== Head-to-head ===
As of 25 March 2025

There is a dispute in the official count of matches. Many sources don't count a few games played between the first team of Argentina against Brazilian State Selections teams, or the first team of Argentina or Brazil played against a "B" team of the rival, so they would not be "International Class A" matches. (Note: This FIFA's source is from Feb. 2013. After that date, they played 11 times, with 5 wins for Argentina, 4 wins for Brazil, 2 ties and 1 suspended match. To see the complete list of matches according to this FIFA's source, please click in "Advanced search", and then in "Show all matches")

There are 6 controversial matches that many sources count them as official games, many others do not count, and many others count some of them and do not count others. These are those controversial games:

- 6 October 1920 (Argentina 3–1 Brazil): many sources say it was not a "Class A match" because it was played with eight players each.
- 22 October 1922 (Brazil 2–1 Argentina): many sources say it was not a "Class A match" because Brazil played with their "B" team. The Brazilian "A" team played the same day the 1922 Copa America final vs. Paraguay.
- 2 December 1923 (Argentina 0–2 Brazil, Copa Confraternidad): many sources say it was not a "Class A match" because Argentina did not play with its "A" team. The Argentine "A" team played in the same day the decisive game against Uruguay in the 1923 Copa América.
- 5 December 1956 (Brazil 1–2 Argentina, Copa Colombo): Many sources say it was not a "Class A match". Brazil did not play with its first national team; it was a Guanabara State Selection.
- 7 August 1968 (Brazil 4–1 Argentina): Many sources say it was not a "Class A match". Brazil did not play with its first national team; it was a Rio de Janeiro State Selection.
- 11 August 1968 (Brazil 3–2 Argentina): Many sources say it was not a "Class A match". Brazil did not play with its first national team; it was a Minas Gerais State Selection.

==== Argentina leads by two matches (44–42) ====
Having said that, according to many sources Argentina has won 44 games and Brazil 42.

Tournament	Matches played	Argentina win	Draw	Brazil win	Argentina goals	Brazil goals
FIFA World Cup	4	1	1	2	3	5
FIFA Confederations Cup	1	0	0	1	1	4
Copa América	34	16	8	10	53	40
FIFA World Cup qualification	11	4	3	4	14	16
Panamerican Championship	3	1	1	1	4	4
Total official matches	53	22	13	18	75	69
Friendly matches	59	22	13	24	93	97
Grand total	112	44	26	42	168	166

==== Argentina leads by one match (43–42) ====
According to many sources Argentina has won 43 games and Brazil 42.

Tournament	Matches played	Argentina win	Draw	Brazil win	Argentina goals	Brazil goals
FIFA World Cup	4	1	1	2	3	5
FIFA Confederations Cup	1	0	0	1	1	4
Copa América	34	16	8	10	53	40
FIFA World Cup qualification	11	4	3	4	14	16
Panamerican Championship	3	1	1	1	4	4
Total official matches	53	22	13	18	75	69
Friendly matches	58	21	13	24	93	97
Grand total	111	43	26	42	168	166

==== Argentina leads by two matches (41–39) ====
According to other sources, Argentina leads by two matches (41 to 39). (Note: This sources do not consider as official the 1920 match (Arg 3 – Bra 1), the 1922 match (Arg 0 - Bra 2), the 1923 match (Arg 0 – Bra 2), the 1956 match (Bra 1 – Arg 2), and the 1968 games (Bra 4 – Arg 1 and Bra 3 – Arg 2). They say those games were played between the first teams of Argentina against brazilian State Selections (cases 1956, and the two games of 1968), or the first team of Argentina or Brazil played against B teams of the rival (cases 1920, 1922 and 1923), so they were not considered as "International Class A" matches.)

Tournament	Matches played	Argentina win	Draw	Brazil win	Argentina goals	Brazil goals
FIFA World Cup	4	1	1	2	3	5
FIFA Confederations Cup	1	0	0	1	1	4
Copa América	34	16	8	10	53	40
FIFA World Cup qualification	11	4	3	4	14	16
Panamerican Championship	3	1	1	1	4	4
Total official matches	53	22	13	18	75	69
Friendly matches	53	19	13	21	85	86
Grand total	106	41	26	39	160	155

==== Brazil leads by one match (43–42) ====
According to other sources Brazil leads by one match (43 to 42). (Note: These sources do not consider as official the 1920 match (ARG 3–1 BRA) and the 1956 match (BRA 1–2 ARG), but do consider the 1922 match (ARG 0–2 BRA), the 1923 match (ARG 0–2 BRA), and the two 1968 games (BRA 4–1 ARG and BRA 3–2 ARG))

Tournament	Matches played	Argentina win	Draw	Brazil win	Argentina goals	Brazil goals
FIFA World Cup	4	1	1	2	3	5
FIFA Confederations Cup	1	0	0	1	1	4
Copa América	34	16	8	10	53	40
FIFA World Cup qualification	11	4	3	4	14	16
Panamerican Championship	3	1	1	1	4	4
Total official matches	53	22	13	18	75	69
Friendly matches	58	20	13	25	90	96
Grand total	111	42	26	43	165	165

=== Knockouts ===
- 1937 South American Championship final: Argentina 2–0 Brazil
- 1990 FIFA World Cup round of 16: Argentina 1–0 Brazil
- 1993 Copa América quarter-final: Argentina 1–1 (6–5 p) Brazil
- 1995 Copa América quarter-final: Argentina 2–2 (2–4 p) Brazil
- 1999 Copa América quarter-final: Argentina 1–2 Brazil
- 2004 Copa América final: Argentina 2–2 (2–4 p) Brazil
- 2005 FIFA Confederations Cup final: Argentina 1–4 Brazil
- 2007 Copa América final: Argentina 0–3 Brazil
- 2019 Copa América semi-final: Argentina 0–2 Brazil
- 2021 Copa América final: Argentina 1–0 Brazil

== Club-level official titles comparison ==
Note: Only official competitions (organised by CONMEBOL and/or other continental confederations) are included.

Competition	Arg.	Bra.
FIFA Club World Cup	0	4
Intercontinental Cup (Note: Defunct competition.)	9	6
Copa Libertadores	25	25
Copa Sudamericana	11	5
Copa CONMEBOL	3	5
Copa Mercosur	1	3
Supercopa Libertadores	6	3
Recopa Sudamericana	12	13
Copa Interamericana	7	0
Copa de Oro	1	2
Copa Master de Supercopa	1	1
Copa Master de CONMEBOL	0	1
Intercontinental Champions' Supercup	0	1
Suruga Bank Cup	3	2
Total	79	71

=== Copa Libertadores de América ===
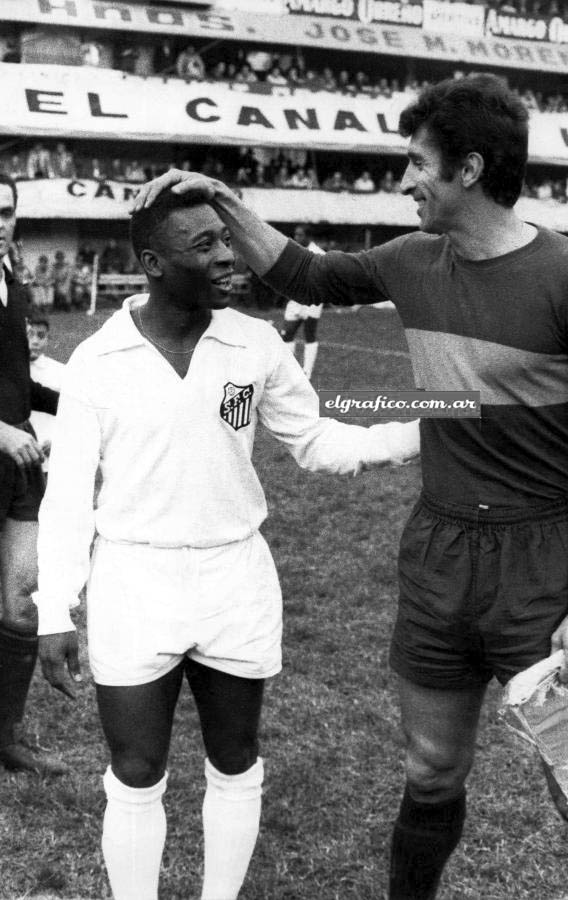
Pelé and Antonio Rattín in the Boca v Santos FC match in La Bombonera. It was the first Copa Libertadores final between sides from both countries

In the history of the Copa Libertadores, played since 1960, only twice has a Brazilian team attained the title on Argentine soil: in 1963, when Brazilian Santos F.C. defeated the most popular Argentine club, Boca Juniors, and in 2017, when Grêmio defeated Club Atlético Lanús. On the other hand, Boca Juniors has achieved three of its six titles on Brazilian soil, defeating Palmeiras in 2000, Santos in 2003 and Grêmio in 2007. The two greatest Argentine and Brazilian football players of all time, Pelé and Maradona, at one point also played in these two clubs: Pelé for Santos and Maradona for Boca Juniors. It has been reported that in all three of Boca Juniors' victories on Brazilian soil, Boca's players were denied a good night's rest the night before their final matches because of the chaos and noise created by Brazilian fans outside their hotel rooms, who attempted to disrupt the Argentine players from performing to the best of their abilities on the competition.

In the international arena, the most successful Argentine clubs are Boca Juniors (six Libertadores and three Intercontinental Cups), Independiente (seven Libertadores and two Intercontinental Cups), Estudiantes de La Plata (four Libertadores and one Intercontinental Cup), River Plate (four Libertadores and one Intercontinental Cup), Vélez Sársfield (one Libertadores and one Intercontinental), San Lorenzo (one Libertadores, one Copa Mercosur and one Copa Sudamericana), Argentinos Juniors (one Libertadores) and Racing Club (one Libertadores and one Intercontinental Cup).

The most successful Brazilian clubs are São Paulo F.C. (three Libertadores, one FIFA Club World Cup, two Intercontinental Cups, two Recopas and one Copa Sudamericana), Santos F.C. (three Libertadores and two Intercontinental Cups), Flamengo (four Libertadores, one Intercontinental Cup, one Copa Mercosur, one Copa de Oro and one Recopa), Grêmio (three Libertadores and one Intercontinental Cup), Corinthians (one Libertadores and two FIFA Club World Cups), Internacional (two Libertadores and one FIFA Club World Cup), Palmeiras (three Libertadores, one Copa Mercosur and one Recopa Sudamericana), Cruzeiro (two Libertadores), Atlético Mineiro (one Libertadores and two Copa Conmebol), Vasco da Gama (one Libertadores and one Copa Mercosur), Botafogo (one Libertadores and one Copa Conmebol) and Fluminense (one Libertadores).

== Women's football ==
The Brazilian women's team had little opportunity before 1980 to progress their skills, as ever since 1940, women's football had been prohibited by law in Brazil; nevertheless, this did not stop women from playing the sport. It was believed that an excess in physical instruction for women could cause "masculinization". For such, women faced significant challenges in defying the ban on women in sports, facing hostilities and a lack of opportunities.

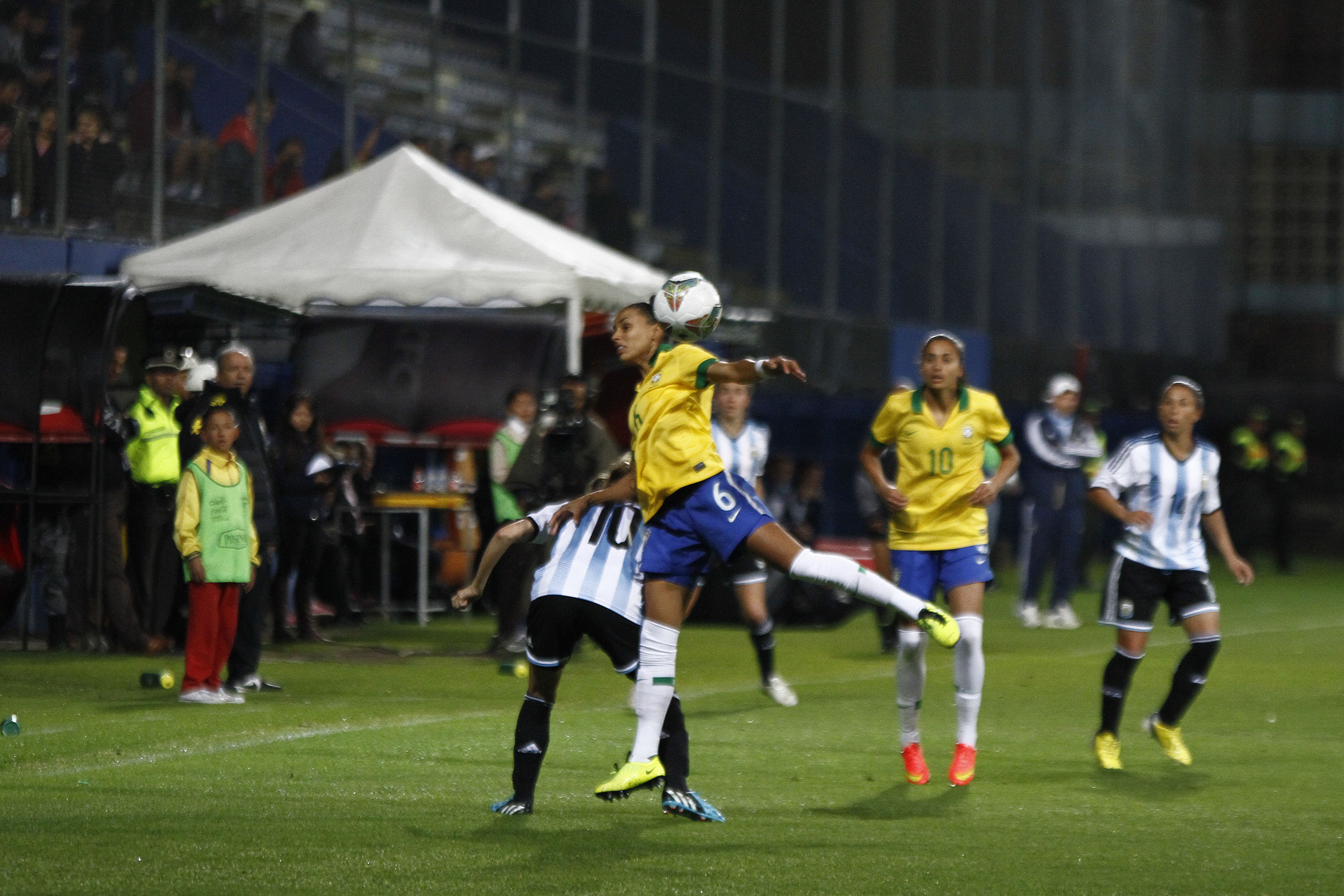
The women's national sides representing Argentina and Brazil play at the 2014 Copa América Femenina.

After a long history of exclusion, in 1991, Brazil would officially be represented by their women's national football team. It was runner-up in the 2007 FIFA Women's World Cup, and won a silver medal at the Olympic Games in 2004, 2008 and 2024. In comparison, Argentina does not have a professional (or even semi-professional) women's football league; the members of the Argentine women's national football team are all amateur players despite their clubs often being affiliated with prominent men's professional clubs. Although the two teams usually have to compete for the top qualification spots for CONMEBOL when the World Cup qualification comes around, this rivalry does not yet enjoy the same public notoriety that men's matches do.

Brazil won every game of the Sudamericano Femenino against Argentina until the 2006 edition, when Argentina finally beat them 2–0 in the final group stage, awarding Argentina the championship. Argentina did not participate in the 1991 South American competition and was second to Brazil in the following three tournaments. Starting with the 2003 edition, both champion and runner-up qualified for the World Cup. As Argentina has never been past the group stages in the World Cup, the two teams have not met in an Olympic Football Tournament yet.

== See also ==
- Argentina–Brazil relations
- Argentine Brazilians
