= 1998 in Brazil =

Events in the year 1998 in Brazil.

== Incumbents ==
=== Federal government ===
- President: Fernando Henrique Cardoso
- Vice President: Marco Maciel

=== Governors ===
- Acre: Orleir Messias Cameli
- Alagoas: Manoel Gomes de Barros (Mano)
- Amapa: João Capiberibe
- Amazonas: Amazonino Mendes
- Bahia: Paulo Souto
- Ceará: Tasso Jereissati
- Espírito Santo: Vitor Buaiz
- Goiás:
  - Maguito Vilela (until 2 April)
  - Naphtali Alves (2 April-24 November)
  - Helenês Cândido (from 24 November)
- Maranhão: Roseana Sarney
- Mato Grosso: Dante de Oliveira
- Mato Grosso do Sul: Wilson Barbosa Martins
- Minas Gerais: Eduardo Brandão Azeredo
- Pará: Almir Gabriel
- Paraíba: José Maranhão
- Paraná: Jaime Lerner
- Pernambuco: Miguel Arraes
- Piauí: Mão Santa
- Rio de Janeiro: Marcello Alencar
- Rio Grande do Norte: Garibaldi Alves Filho
- Rio Grande do Sul: Antônio Britto
- Rondônia: Valdir Raupp de Mattos
- Roraima: Neudo Ribeiro Campos
- Santa Catarina: Paulo Afonso Vieira
- São Paulo: Mário Covas
- Sergipe: Albano Franco
- Tocantins:
  - José Wilson Siqueira Campos (until 3 April)
  - Raimundo Nonato Pires dos Santos (from 3 April)

=== Vice governors ===
- Acre: Labib Murad
- Alagoas: Vacant
- Amapá: Antônio Hildegardo Gomes de Alencar
- Amazonas: Vacant
- Bahia: César Borges
- Ceará: Moroni Bing Torgan (until 1 January)
- Espírito Santo: José Renato Casagrande
- Goiás:
  - Naphtali Alves de Souza (until 3 April)
  - Vacant thereafter (starting 3 April)
- Maranhão: José Reinaldo Carneiro Tavares
- Mato Grosso: José Márcio Panoff de Lacerda
- Mato Grosso do Sul: Vacant
- Minas Gerais: Walfrido Silvino dos Mares Guia Neto
- Pará: Hélio Mota Gueiros Júnior
- Paraíba: Vacant
- Paraná: Emília de Sales Belinati
- Pernambuco: Jorge José Gomes
- Piauí: Osmar Antônio de Araújo
- Rio de Janeiro: Luiz Paulo Correa da Rocha
- Rio Grande do Norte: Fernando Freire
- Rio Grande do Sul: Vicente Joaquim Bogo
- Rondônia: Aparício Carvalho de Moraes
- Roraima: Airton Antonio Soligo
- Santa Catarina: José Augusto Hülse
- São Paulo: Geraldo Alckmin
- Sergipe: José Carlos Machado
- Tocantins:
  - Raimundo Nonato Pires dos Santos (until 4 April)
  - Vacant thereafter (starting 4 April)

== Events ==
=== January ===
- January 5: João Acácio Pereira da Costa, known as the Red Light Bandit, is killed with a shotgun blast in Joinville, Santa Catarina.
- January 22: The new Brazilian Traffic Code comes into force, stating that "safe traffic is a right to all and a duty of the bodies and entities of the National Transit System."

=== February ===
- February 22: A part of the Condominium Palace II collapses in Barra da Tijuca, Rio de Janeiro; destroying 44 apartments and leaving eight buried.

=== March ===
- March 24: President Fernando Henrique Cardoso signs the Pelé Law with 17 vetoes. This forces professional sports clubs to observe business law and pay tax within two years.

=== April ===
- April 18: Music Online Records, music portal is launched.

=== August ===
- August 4: Francisco de Assis Pereira, accused of killing at least eight women at the State Park in São Paulo; is arrested in Itaqui, Rio Grande do Sul.
- August 12: The Superior Electoral Court unanimously rejects the request to register the candidacy of ex-president Fernando Collor de Mello for the presidency of the Republic in the 1998 presidential election.
- August 25: Former military police officer Marcos Aurélio Dias de Alcântara is sentenced to 204 years in prison by the justice of Rio de Janeiro for having participated in the 1993 Massacre at Candelária.

=== October ===
- October 4: Fernando Henrique Cardoso is re-elected president of Brazil in the first round. This is the first time an incumbent president is re-elected in the country's history.
- October 25: The second round of elections for governor takes place in several states of Brazil.

=== November ===
- November 28: Ten former military police officers, accused of participating in the 1993 Vigário Geral massacre, are acquitted by the Rio de Janeiro court.

=== December ===
- December 16: Wellington Camargo, brother of Zezé Di Camargo & Luciano, is kidnapped in Goiânia.

== Births ==
=== January ===
- January 13 – Isabela Souza, actress
- January 18 – Éder Militão, footballer

=== April ===
- April 8 – Renan Lodi, footballer

=== May ===
- May 9 – Douglas Luiz, footballer
- May 20 – Alanis Guillen, actress

=== July ===
- July 3 – Pedro Piquet, racing driver
- July 28 – Sasha Meneghel, model

=== December ===
- December 16 – Clara Moneke, actress and model

== Deaths ==
=== March ===
- March 15 – Tim Maia, singer (b. 1942)

=== April ===
- April 18 – Nelson Gonçalves, singer (b. 1919)

=== June ===
- June 13 – Lúcio Costa, architect (b. 1902)

=== July ===
- July 26 – Aymoré Moreira, footballer and coach (b. 1912)

== See also ==
- 1998 in Brazilian football
- 1998 in Brazilian television
