= Copa Roberto Chery =

1919 friendly football match

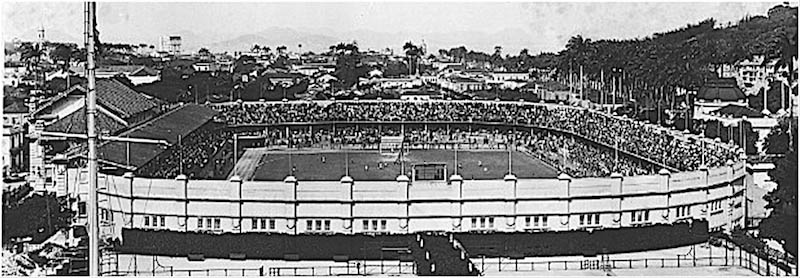
- Estadio das Laranjeiras, venue
- Event: Friendly match
Brazil	Argentina
(Brazil)	(Argentina)
3	3
- No winner declared. The trophy was sent to C.A. Peñarol.
- Date: 1 July 1919
- Venue: Estádio de Laranjeiras, Rio de Janeiro
- Referee: Angelo Minoli (Uruguay)
- Attendance: 30,000

The Copa Roberto Chery (English: Roberto Chery Cup) was a friendly football match played between the national teams of Argentina and Brazil, on 1 July 1919.

The match was organised by the Brazilian Football Confederation in honour of Roberto Chery, goalkeeper of Peñarol and Uruguay national team, who died 30 May 1919, aged 23, in Rio de Janeiro. His death was caused by a hernia complicated by strangulation which he suffered in the match between Uruguay and Chile on 17 May at the 1919 South American Championship. It was originally thought to be played between Brazil and Uruguay, but as the Uruguayan players, still shocked by the tragedy, declined to participate, Argentina took their place.

Brazil played this match wearing a black and yellow striped shirt, in honor of Club Atlético Peñarol, team of Chery, while Argentina wore a light blue shirt resembling the Uruguayan uniform. That was the 8th time that Argentina and Brazil faced each other.

Once the match finished, and per agreement of both captains, the trophy was given to Club Peñarol, while part of the revenue was sent to Chery's family.

== Match details ==
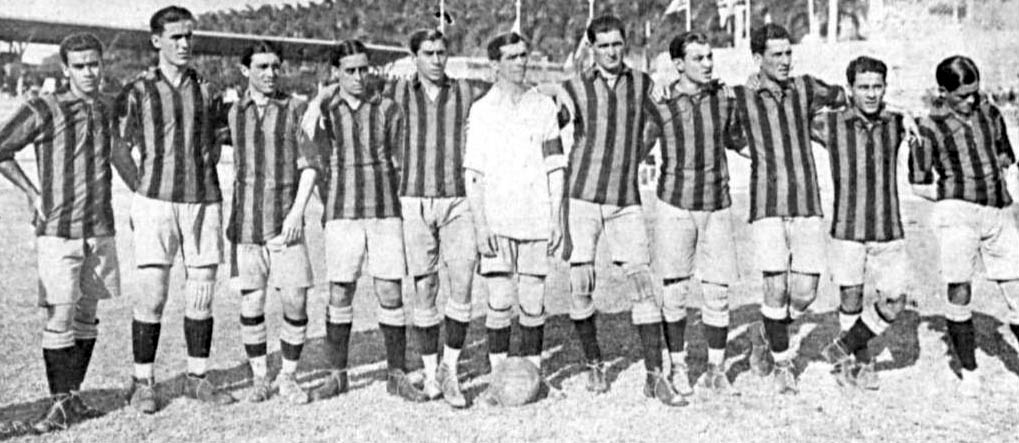
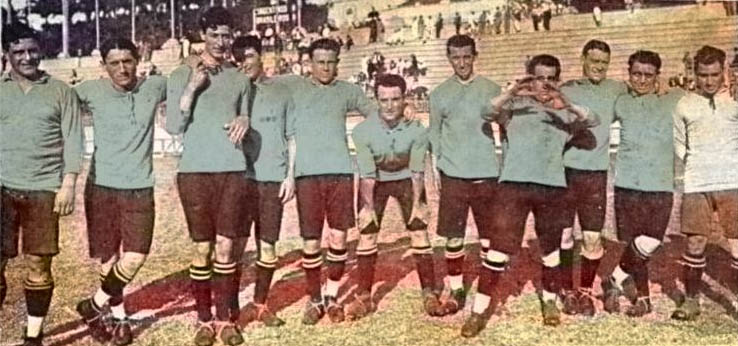
Brazil (left, wearing the C.A. Peñarol shirt) and Argentina (wearing the light blue shirt of Uruguay) teams
1 July 1919

Brazil	3–3	Argentina
Arlindo; Haroldo	Report	Clarke; Matozzi; Laiolo 80'

Estádio das Laranjeiras, Rio de Janeiro
Attendance: 30,000
Referee: Angelo Minoli (URU)

Brazil
Argentina

GK	Dyonísio
DF	Palamone
DF	Bianco
MF	Laís
MF	Picagli
MF	Martins
FW	Carregal
FW	Millon
FW	Heitor
FW	Arlindo
FW	Haroldo
Manager:
(Brazil) Ground Committee

GK	Carlos Isola
DF	Roberto Castagnola
DF	Armando Reyes
MF	Ernesto Matozzi
MF	Eduardo Uslenghi
MF	Pedro Martínez
FW	Pedro Calomino
FW	José Laiolo
FW	Edwin Clarke
FW	Nicolás Rofrano
FW	Adolfo Taggino
Manager:
(Argentina) (None for this game)

== See also ==
- Argentina–Brazil football rivalry
