= Mulherio =

Mulherio (Womanhood) was an alternative Brazilian feminist newspaper, published between 1981 and 1989, in the context of the post-dictatorship redemocratization of Brazil. Researchers at the Carlos Chagas Foundation (FCC) idealized it as an exchange bulletin among research groups studying women. The publication came to be through the efforts of researcher Fulvia Rosemberg and journalist Adélia Borges. It discussed various themes relating to women's rights in Brazil and the world, health, employment, culture, and politics.

The newspaper's first phase, from March 1981 to September 1983, had 16 editions (0-15). In the second phase, from 1984 to 1988 (16-39) the newspaper, now edited by Inês Castilho, left the Carlos Chagas Foundation's ownership due to editorial disputes. In its third phase, Mulherio changed its name to Nexo, Feminismo e Cultura (Nexus, Feminism, and Culture). This phase only lasted for two editions.

== Collaborators ==
- Carmen Barroso
- Carmen da Silva
- Ciça
- Maria Carneiro da Cunha
- Heloísa Buarque de Hollanda
- Ruth Cardoso
- Lélia Gonzalez
- Maria Rita Kehl
- Heleieth Saffioti
- Maria Lucia de Barros Mott
