= Rose Marie Muraro =

Brazilian sociologist, author and feminist (1930–2014)

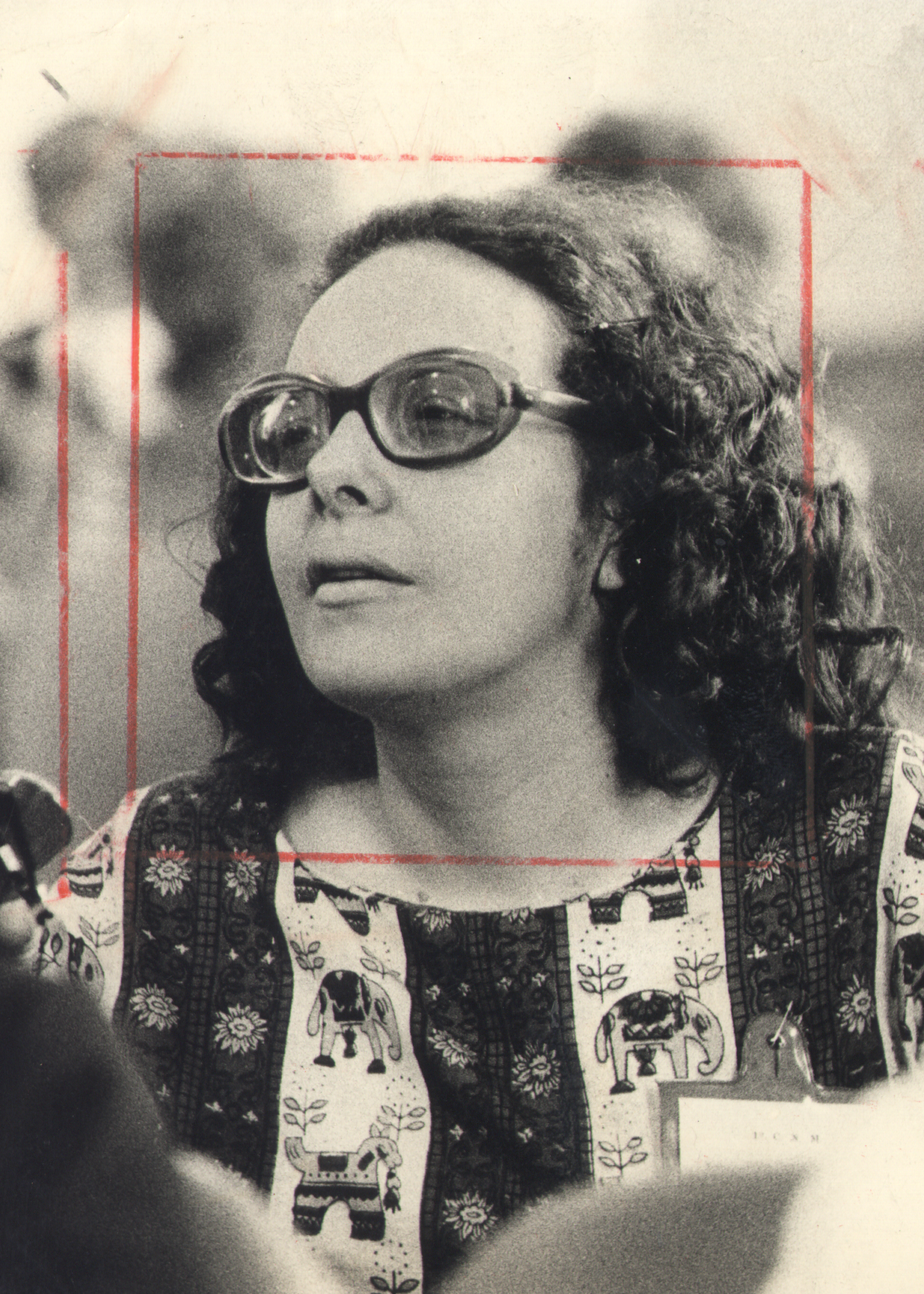
- Rose Marie Muraro
- Born: 1930
- Died: June 21, 2014 (aged 83–84); Rio de Janeiro
- Writing career
- Subject: Feminism
- Notable works: Automation of the future of man (1966); Sexual Liberation of Women (1975); and, Sexuality of the Brazilian Woman: Body and social class in Brazil (1983)

Rose Marie Muraro (Rio de Janeiro, November 11, 1930 – Rio de Janeiro, June 21, 2014) was a Brazilian sociologist, writer, intellectual and feminist. Born nearly blind, she was the author of over 40 books and also served as publisher and director of Vozes.

== Early life and education ==
Muraro studied physics and economics, before becoming a writer and editor. She also spoke different languages and studied mathematics. She published controversial books, challenging modern social values. After editing Vozes, she became the editor of Espaço &Tempo (1986–1988), Rosa dos Tempos (1989–1998) and, Editora Record.

== Career ==
Muraro was a prominent figure in the development of the feminist movement in Brazil. Like other authors such as Carmen da Silva, Heloneida Studart, and Heleieth Saffioti, Muraro was considered part of the first-wave Brazilian feminists, who started addressing women's condition in their works. She began advocating for gender equality in 1967 with the publication of her book Libertecao sexual da muher. Early in her career, however, she did not label herself a feminist and would only embrace it when she became the editor of the publishing house Vozes. This has been attributed to the negative connotation of the nascent feminism in Brazil. An account noted that the Brazilian feminism positioned itself self-consciously in relation to the politics of public and private spheres.

Muraro was also a proponent of Liberation Theology. She was a founding member the movement, which was established by the theologian Leonardo Boff. She was fielded as candidate of the PDT and PT political parties.

Muraro wrote her memoir in 1999. It is said that her creative writing students at Temple University prompted her to write about her life.

== Death ==
She died in 2014 of bone marrow cancer.

== Partial works ==
- "Educando meninos e meninas para um mundo novo" (2007)
- "História do masculino e do feminino" (2007)
- "Uma nova visao da politica e da economia" (2007)
- "Historia do meio ambiente" (2007)
- "Para onde vão os jovens" (2007)
- "A mulher na construção do futuro" (2007)
- "O que as mulheres não dizem aos homens" (2006)
- "Diálogo para o futuro" (2006)
- "Mais lucro" (2006)
- "Espírito de Deus pairou sobre as águas" (2004)
- "Por que nada satisfaz as mulheres e os homens não" (2003)
- "Um mundo novo em gestação" (2003)
- "Amor de A a Z" (2003)
- "A paixão pelo impossível" (2003)
- "Feminino e masculino"' (2002)
- "As mais belas orações de todos os tempos" (2001)
- "Textos da fogueira" (2000)
- "A alquimia da juventude" (1999)
- "Memórias de uma mulher impossível" (1999)
- "As mais belas palavras de amor" (1996)
- "Sexualidade da mulher brasileira" (1996)
- "Seis meses em que fui homem" (1993)
- "A mulher no terceiro milênio" (1993)
- "Poemas para encontrar Deus" (1990)
