= Odette de Barros Mott =

- Born: May 24, 1913; Igarapava, São Paulo, Brazil
- Died: May 21, 1998 (aged 84); São Paulo, Brazil
- Occupation: Author
- Awards: Monteiro Lobato Award, Hans Cristian Andersen Award

Odette de Barros Mott (Igarapava, May 24, 1913 – São Paulo, May 21, 1998), Brazilian writer, known for children's fiction. With more than a million copies sold of her more than 60 titles, Odette was one of the precursors of children's literature in Brazil.

== Biography ==
Odette de Barros was born in Igarapava, in the countryside of São Paulo state, in 1913. The family moved to the state capital São Paulo when she was a child. Her father, Carlos Rodrigues de Barros, self-taught and a polyglot, inspired her interest in reading and literature. Graduated from the teacher-training course at Instituto de Educação Caetano de Campos (Caetano de Campos Institute of Education) in São Paulo, she worked as an elementary schoolteacher at the Colégio de Santana. At 22 years old, in 1935, she published Tranquilidade (Tranquility), a poetry book, with preface by Correa Junior. At 24 she married Italian-born naturalized Brazilian Leo Mott, and had eight children, among them historian and feminist Maria Lucia de Barros Mott, social psychologist Fúlvia Rosemberg, and anthropologist Luiz Mott. She encouraged her children to love literature from a very early age and wrote stories initially for them, which, with her later work, were published by Brazilian publishers.

She wrote Aventura no País das Nuvens (Adventure in the Country of Clouds), her first children's book, for her children when small. As adolescents they noted the lack of Brazilian books for children and persuaded her to publish; it was published in 1949 by Editora do Brasil. After came Aventura do Escoteiro Bila (Bila the Scout's Adventure) (1964) and A Montanha Partida (The Split Mountain) (1965), books for adolescents, which were read by her children and later their friends. When they were finally published, critics and the public enjoyed them. The most reprinted are O Filho do Bandeirante (The Pioneer's Son) and Justino, o retirante (Justin the Migrant).

In 1969, Odette published O Mistério do Escudo de Ouro (The Mystery of the Gold Dubloon) and visited several schools to speak to students and teachers in literary events, in which they started to ask for her opinion on various matters such as drugs, sex, and relationships. Odette began to ponder these topics and proposed works that gave place to those discussions, provoked dialogs, and opened new horizons.

The man of tomorrow must not be just another number in the mass, because the new face of this planet will largely depend on his individual metamorphosis.

Odette's books had sold one million copies by 1981. She frequently communicated with students and readers, who sent incredibly varied questions to her author, seeing her as a confidant, teacher, and sometimes even as a second mother. Many of her books were translated into other languages, and published in Braille for those with visual impairments.

== Awards and honours ==
She won the Hans Christian Andersen Award for children's literature. Three libraries in the state of São Paulo are named Odette de Barros Mott.

== Death ==
Odette wrote and produced books for many years, right until she died, on May 21, 1998 in the São Camilo hospital in São Paulo, aged 84. Her body was cremated at the Vila Alpina Crematorium.

== Works ==
Number	Title	Year(s)	Genre	Collection	Editor	Number of Pages
01	The 8th C Series	1976 - 1995	YA	Jovens do mundo todo	Brasiliense/Atual	148
02	The Nameless Witch and, The Cuckcoo Clock	1989	Children's		Vozes	31
03	The Path to the South	1981	YA	Jovens do mundo todo	Brasiliense	106
04	The House on the Hill	1958	YA		Brasil	90
05	The Story of the Two Little Turkeys	1983	YA		Paulinas	100
06	The Great Illusion or The Trans-Amazonian	1981	YA	Jovens do mundo todo	Brasiliense	164
07	The Story Told	1988	Children's	Akpalo alo	Brasil	22
08	The Broken Mountain: The Mystery of the Expedition	(1965)	YA	Jovens do mundo todo	Brasiliense/Atual	124
09	The Revolt of the Numbers	2002	Children's	Dente de leite	Paulinas	23
10	The Rose of the Winds	1981	YA	Jovens do mundo todo	Brasiliense	111
11	The Third Drawer	1986	YA		Atual	62
12	The Crossing	1987	--		Atual	66
13	It Happened Yesterday	1987	About Slavery		Atual	105
14	Now, Who Tells the Duckies	1987	Children's	Fazendo histórias	Paulinas	24
15	We Still Have Tomorrow	1998	Rose of the Times		Rosa dos tempos	126
16	Tomorrow on the Beach	1997	YA	Adolescer	Lê	160
17	The Employees	1981	YA	Jovens do mundo todo	Brasiliense	89
18	On the banks of the Araguaia	1988	YA	Viagem da leitura	Marco Zero	63
19	Behind the Pirate Papa-Tudo	1986	YA	Segundas histórias	FTD	47
20	Bila the Scout's Adventure	1964	YA	Jovens do mundo todo	Brasiliense	84
21	Adventure in the Country of Clouds	1949	Children's		do Brasil	43
22	Adventures of the Little Red Fish and the Drop of Water	No Date	Children's		do Brasil	44
23	The Crossing	1987	YA		Atual	68
24	Paths	1983	YA	Jovens do mundo todo	Brasiliense	77
25	How the Owl Learned to Sing	1988	Children's	Fazendo história	Paulinas	20
26	Where I Came From	1985	YA	Liberdade ação	do Brasil	47
27	Decision of Love	1990	YA	Arco-íris	Paulinas	175
28	Lady Cockroach and John the Rat	1986	Children's		Editar	32
29	What Now?	1977	YA	Jovens do mundo todo	Brasiliense	114
30	This Earth is Ours	1982	YA	Jovens do mundo todo	Brasiliense	120
31	Me and My Family	1993	YA	Adolescer	Lê	127
32	Orphanage Vacation	1986	YA	Akpalo	do Brasil	71
33	Justin the Migrant	1972	YA	Jovens do mundo todo	Brasiliense	96
34	Marco and the Indians of Araguaia	1988	YA	Jovens do mundo todo	Brasiliense	108
35	Marzão	1984	YA	Jovens do mundo todo	Brasiliense	
36	It's Really Better to be a Lioness	1986	Children's		Melhoramentos	16
37	My Life as a Child	1994	YA	Transalivre	Lê	159
38	My Grandma has a Lion, I have an Alligator and my Cousin André has an Elephant	1988	Children's	Série pique	Ática	32
39	Mystery? Mysterious Love	1981	YA	Jovens do mundo todo	Brasiliense	96
40	In Soap Alley	1985	YA		Atual	67
41	On the Roadmap of Courage	1972	YA		do Brasil	174
42	Our Club	1985	YA	Jovens do mundo todo	Brasiliense	74
43	The Dollhouse	--	YA	Jovens do mundo todo	Brasiliense	
44	The Case of the Island	1980	YA	Jovens do mundo todo	Brasiliense	66
45	My People's Calling	1989	YA	Veredas	Moderna	103
46	The Cool Kids Club	1981	YA	Jovens do mundo todo	Brasiliense	89
47	The Prettiest Day	1984	Children's	Algodão doce	15	
48	The Pioneer's Son	1980	YA	Jovens do mundo todo	Brasiliense	52
49	The Movie in the Panda's Stomach	1982	YA	Jovens do mundo todo	Brasiliense	94
50	The Eliza Beauty Institute	1986	YA	Atual	67	
51	The Dream Seller	1991	YA	Veredas	Moderna	80
52	The Mystery of the Doll	1981	YA	Jovens do mundo todo	Brasiliense	60
53	The Mystery of the Black Button	1981	YA	Jovens do mundo todo	Brasiliense	120 120
54	The Mystery of the Gold Dubloon	1969	YA	Jovens do mundo todo	Brasiliense	119
55	The Boy, the Girl, and the Bad Wind	2006	Children's	Lazúli	Nacional	41
56	The Muiraquitã	1983	YA	Jovens do mundo todo	Brasiliense	69
57	Jesus's First Smile	1983	Children's		Paulinas	20
58	The Mouse and the Moon Cheese	1994	Children's	Varinha mágica	Vozes	15
59	The Theft of the Little Fish	1991	YA	Teatro na escola	Letras & letras	31
60	Lenita's Secret	1978	Children's	Biblioteca Pioneira de literatura infantil e juvenil. Série infantil	Livraria Pioneira	40
61	The Detective Bunnies	1978	Children's	Série patinho amarelo	Melhoramentos	32
62	The Two Sides of the Coin	1981	YA	Jovens do mundo todo	Brasiliense	100
63	Pedro the Stonemason	1981	YA	Jovens do mundo todo	Brasiliense	93
64	Why did They Kidnap Soraya?	1990	YA		Atual	108
65	Mr. Leo and Pintadinho	1991	Children's	Série lagarta pintada	Ática	94
66	Under the Cross of the Stars	1987	YA	Nossa história	FTD	95
67	Coward's Trauma	1992	YA	Veredas	Moderna	70
68	Tranquility	1935	Poems			
69	The Story of Fear	1992	YA	Série preta	Livros do tatu	45
70	Coming with the Wind	1982	YA	Girassol	Moderna	40
