= Maria Lucia de Barros Mott =

Brazilian historian, feminist, writer (1948–2011)

Maria Lúcia de Barros Mott de Mello Souza
- Born: December 16, 1948; São Paulo, Brazil
- Died: June 26, 2011 (aged 62); São Paulo, Brazil
- Education: Universidade de São Paulo
- Known for: Birth studies and feminism

Maria Lúcia de Barros Mott (December 16, 1948 – June 26, 2011) was a historian, writer, and feminist in Brazil.

Since the 1980s, Mott developed studies regarding health history with an emphasis on births in Brazil. Her work served as a precursor to gender studies in the country, publishing the book "Submission and Resistance, the woman in the fight against slavery" in 1992.

== Biography ==
Maria Lúcia was born in the capital of São Paulo in 1948. She was the eighth daughter of author Odette de Barros Mott and Leo Mott. At 19 years old, in 1968, she began her studies in History at the University of São Paulo (USP). She had frequent contact with artists who worked at the Park of the Republic (Praça da República), where she made ceramics, painted, and identified with the hippie generation and counterculture ideologies.

Feeling like she was in the wrong major, Maria Lúcia paused her education and travelled to France for about a year, than to the United States for another year. Abroad, she participated in several classes about black culture. She returned to Brazil briefly, just to leave again, this time for England and then India. During these travels she finished her undergraduate studies. In 1976, Mott when to work at the Carlos Chagas Foundation (FCC). During this time she began to identify as a feminist and conduct research.

I always saw research as a form of political activism.

During these first years, Maria Lúcia joined the feminist newspaper Mulherio. In 1979, she received her Bachelor's degree in history from the University of São Paulo. Between 1988 and 1998, Mott completed her doctorate studies in social history at USP and wrote her thesis Parto, parteiras e parturientes no século XIX: Mme. Durocher e sua época (Birth, Midwives, and Labor in the 19th Century: Madame Durocher and her Era), under the tutelage of Maria Odila da Silva Dias.

== Career ==
Maria Lúcia was part of the editorial team of Rio de Janeiro's magazine Estudos Feministas (Feminist Studies) from its first issue (in 1992), through the entire time the magazine was edited by the contemporary studies department in the communications college at the Federal University of Rio de Janeiro (until the end of 1994). She was responsible for organizing the dossier Birth in Estudos Feministas (volume 10, n.2, 2002), in which she published the article Bibliografia comentada sobre assistência ao parto no Brasil, 1972–2002 (Bibliography of Commentary on Birth Helps in Brazil).

In 1994, participated in a conference and delivered her lecture: Ser parteira: a representação de uma profissão" (Being a Midwife: the Representation of a Profession). She then developed her post-doctorate project: Caminhos cruzados: os cursos para formação de parteiras e enfermeiras em São Paulo, 1890–1971 (Crossed Paths: Graduation Courses for Midwives and Nurses in São Paulo, 1890–1971), which kept her in an intense and fruitful collaboration with docents of obstetric nursing and the history of nursing, as well as other graduates from USP's nursing school (EEUSP).

With immense generosity, Mott never thought twice about offering or giving away the data she had collected and making her articles and written works readily available. She incentivized the elaboration of modern works based on period research, especially witness and experience testimonies of those who worked in the labor and delivery field, i.e. not just in the books and other documentation that the majority of other academics considered to be more "serious".

Maria Lúcia Mott, as she was best known, used her dissertation in 1998 to revitalize the journey of the first midwife in Brazil: Madame Durocher. Her thesis, along with other works in the field, became essential to those who wanted to dedicate themselves to the study of the "art of birth" in Brazil. Her studies are related to those of political history, institutional policy, healthcare procedures, philanthropy, gender studies, and health and memorycare history. She wrote Pérola Byington's biography; being her daughter's friend, Maria Lúcia was granted access to the family's archive.

Between 1999 and 2000, Mott received a scholarship from the University of São Paulo to perform a post-doctorate internship under the thesis Destinos cruzados: os cursos para formação de parteiras e enfermeiras em São Paulo (1898–1971) (Across Destinies: Graduate Courses for Midwives and Nurses in São Paulo (1898–1971)). Her exposition A história da maternidade: uma visão do Século XIX" (The Story of Maternity: a Vision of the 19th Century) made her stand out at the International Conference for the Humanization of Labor and Birth (held in Fortaleza in 2000).

Maria Lúcia coordinated the project team for Memórias de nascimento: parteiras e a atenção do parto na cidade de São Paulo (1930–1980) (Birth Memories: Midwives and the Attention to Birth in the City of São Paulo (1930–1980). These results are available on the website of the Cultural Historical Center of Iberian-American Nursing (EEUSP); they are documents about the attention to birth and interviews with obstretitions, midwives, and obstetric nurses, a collection of newspaper cutouts about the Serviço Obstétrico Domiciliar (Domestic Obstetric Service), and a comentated bibliography about the midwives and obstetric attendants.

In 2005, in Portugal, she gave the lecture "Parteiras: o outro lado da profissão" (Midwives: The Other Side of the Profession). Her arguments incentivized the president of the Portuguese Nurses' Association to study the theme, which resulted in the book Comadres e matronas: contributo para a História das Parteiras em Portugal (séculos XIII-XIX) (Comrades and Matrons: Contribution to the History of Midwives in Portugal (18th–19th Century), which was published in May 2011. The book arrived in Brazil after Mott's death.

Between 2006 and 2008, Maria Lúcia received a scholarship from Instituto de Saúde do Estado de São Paulo (The State of São Paulo Institute of Health) to conduct research on the nucleus of documentation and information on collective health from the Biblioteca do Instituto de Saúde (Health Institute Library). Starting in 2007, she coordenated the São Paulo team for Rede Brasil de Patrimônio Cultural da Saúde (Brazil Health Cultural Heritage Network), directed by the Casa de Oswaldo Cruz (Oswaldo Cruz House). Within this network, she conducted a survey amongst the health institutions of São Paulo from the colonial era until the 1950s; at the same time organizing documentation on the topic. She organized the book História da Saúde em São Paulo: instituições e patrimônio arquitetônico (Health History in São Paulo: Institutions and Architectural Heritage), from the collection História e Patrimônio da Saúde (Health History and Heritage), published in October 2011, after her death.

With her team, she wrote several articles such as "Moças e senhoras dentistas: formação, titulação e mercado de trabalho nas primeiras décadas da República (Female Dentists Young and Old: Education, Titration, and the Job Market in the First Decades of the Republic)", published in Historia, Ciências, Saúde-Manguinhos (History, Sciences, Health-Manguinhos) (volume 15, 2008) and "Médicos e médicas em São Paulo e os livros de registros do Serviço de Fiscalização do Exercício Profissional (1892–1932) (Male and Female Doctors in São Paulo and the Record Books of the Professional Practice Inspection Service (1892–1932))", published in Ciência & Saúde Coletiva (Science and Health Collective) (volume 13, 2008).

In her final years, Mott was a researcher at Instituto Butantan (linked to the Health Department of the State of São Paulo). She coordinated research projects, published scholarly articles, held conferences, and participated in events linked to political history, institutions, and health professionals. Within her scientific works, she published in the United States, France, and Portugal. Her activism, writings, and legacy as a whole are indispensable to obstetric history and nursing, especially in São Paulo.

Maria Lúcia Mott married historian José Inácio de Mello Souza, and had a daughter with him named Veridiana.

== Death ==
She would've finished her final work, to which she had dedicated the last four years of her life: a book about the history of hospitals in São Paulo. However, in 2010, she was diagnosed with lung cancer, to which she succumbed in São Paulo on June 26, 2011, at 62 years old.

== Works ==
- Esclavitud en femenino
- Submissão e resistência: a mulher na luta contra a escravidão. São Paulo: Contexto (coleção Repensando a História), 1988.
- O romance de Ana Durocher. Editora Siciliano, 1995. 220 páginas.
- O gesto que salva: Pérola Byington e a Cruzada Pró-Infância, 188 páginas, 2005. ISBN 8598953024.
- No tempo das missões. Editora Scipione.

=== Articles ===
- «A criança escrava na literatura de viagens», artigo na revista Cadernos de pesquisa (Fundação Carlos Chagas), n.º 31, páginas. 57–68, 1979.
- «A parteira ignorante: um erro de diagnóstico médico?», artigo na revista Estudos Feministas, volume 7, n.º 1. Florianópolis, 1999. ISSN 0104-026x.
- «Ser mãe: a escrava em face do aborto e do infanticídio», artigo na Revista de História (Nova Série), Nº. 120, páginas 85–96, Janeiro–Julho 1989.

== Bibliography ==
- Mott, Luiz Roberto de Barros (2003). Homossexualidade. Editora Grupo Gay da Bahia. p. 132.
