= 1919 in Brazilian football =

Football in Brazil
- Season: 1919

The following article presents a summary of the 1919 football (soccer) season in Brazil, which was the 18th season of competitive football in the country.

== Campeonato Paulista ==
Final Standings

Position	Team	Points	Played	Won	Drawn	Lost	For	Against	Difference
1	Paulistano	30	18	14	2	2	62	19	43
2	Palestra Itália-SP	29	18	14	1	3	59	21	38
3	Corinthians	26	18	12	2	4	51	16	35
4	Ypiranga-SP	25	18	11	3	4	56	34	22
5	AA São Bento	16	18	7	2	9	38	44	−6
6	Santos	13	18	6	1	11	36	43	−7
7	SC Internacional de São Paulo	11	15	3	5	7	26	44	−18
8	Minas Gerais	10	15	4	2	9	18	49	−31
9	AA das Palmeiras	6	15	3	0	12	27	57	−30
10	Mackenzie	2	15	1	0	14	11	57	−46

Paulistano declared as the Campeonato Paulista champions.

== State championship champions ==
State	Champion	State	Champion
Amazonas	Nacional	Paraná	Britânia
Bahia	Botafogo-BA	Pernambuco	América-PE
Espírito Santo	Rio Branco-ES	Rio de Janeiro (DF)	Fluminense
Maranhão	Luso Brasileiro	Rio Grande do Norte	América-RN
Minas Gerais	América-MG	Rio Grande do Sul	Brasil de Pelotas
Pará	Remo	São Paulo	Paulistano
Paraíba	Palmeiras-PB	Sergipe	not disputed

== Brazil national team ==
The following table lists all the games played by the Brazil national football team in official competitions and friendly matches during 1919.

Date	Opposition	Result	Score	Brazil scorers	Competition
May 11, 1919	Chile	W	6–0	Friedenreich (3), Neco (2), Haroldo	South American Championship
May 18, 1919	Argentina	W	3–1	Heitor, Amílcar, Millon	South American Championship
May 26, 1919	Uruguay	D	2–2	Neco (2)	South American Championship
May 29, 1919	Uruguay	W	1–0	Friedenreich	South American Championship
June 1, 1919	Argentina	D	3–3	Haroldo, Arlindo (2)	Taça Roberto Cherry
