= Edgard Cognat =

Brazilian painter and sculptor

- Born: Edgard Cognat; March 13, 1919; Rio de Janeiro, Brazil
- Died: August 15, 1994 (aged 75); Rio de Janeiro, Brazil
- Known for: Painting, Drawing

Edgard Cognat (March 13, 1919 – August 16, 1994) was a Brazilian painter and sculptor born in Rio de Janeiro.

== Early life and career ==
As a child, during his school years, Edgard already showed interest in art, specially drawing. He was also a music enthusiast, and his favourite instrument was the violin. He actually studied violin with his father and he turned 16, though a short time later he realized music wasn't for him, and he decided to dedicate most of his time to his biggest talent: painting.

At 17, he joined the "Belas Artes" course in Rio directed by Professor Carlos Chambelland, with whom he studied drawing, painting and decorative art. After studying the methods used by some of the greatest European artists of all time, like Rembrandt, Rubens, Dürer and others, he started his unique experiences with drawing, in several different phases: "água-forte" (in metal), xylography (drawing in wood) and lithography (drawing in stone). Four years later, he showed his artwork for the first time at the "Salão Nacional de Belas Artes", and in the following year he showed his work again there, this time receiving two awards: the "Menção Honrosa" in painting and the "Medalha de Bronze" in drawing.

== World War II ==
During the World War II, Edgard had to stop his activities because he was called by the Brazilian Army to join their forces in Italy, where he stayed for two years as a member of the "FEB". When the war was over, in 1945, Edgard regressed to Brazil and he continued his work, this time winning another "Medalha de Bronze" for his new exposition at the "Salão Nacional de Belas Artes", as well as the "Medalha de Ouro" for his painting "Indústria do Vidro", which measures 2,30m x 1,90m, and represents the fabrication of glass in the first factory of its kind in Brazil.

In 1956, Edgard won the "Medalha de Prata" during an exposition promoted by the Brazilian "Casa da Moeda".

== International success ==
In Buenos Aires, Edgard exposed his artwork at the "Salão Ramos Mejia", where he also won several awards. Some of his painting and drawings were or still are exposed in countries such as Argentina, Portugal and Italy.

He was invited by the "Ossevartorio Cristiano", in Assis, Italy, to expose some of his artwork there as well as replacing Professor Carlos Oswald.

Among some of his most famous drawings and paintings are "São Francisco de Paula Walking on the Waves", dated from 1973, the "Indústria do Vidro" and a painting that he made for the "National Association of War Veterans in Brazil".
