= Music Online Records =

One of the oldest and largest music portals in Brazil, online since April 18, 1998

- Website type: Music
- Creator: Andre Luis de Andrade
- Website: www.musiconline.com.br
- Commercial: No
- Registration: Optional
- Launched: April 18, 1998; 28 years ago
- Current status: Active

Music Online Records is one of the oldest and largest music portals in Brazil, online since April 18, 1998. The headquarters is in Curitiba, Paraná, Brazil, in the São Francisco neighborhood.

== History ==
The portal started as a hobby of the web developer Andre Luis de Andrade, to help artists publicise their music. It was one of the first such projects around the world to focus on music for free, preceding MySpace.

At its inception, the site was developed in pure HTML, hosted on free servers like GeoCities, Tripod.com and Xoom. Since 2000, when the site bought the domain www.musiconline.com.br and launched the new automated services, it has been available for free to bands, artists and composers using the VIP AREA. The systems were developed using PHP and MySQL.

Between 2000 and 2006, Music Online Records had high classification at the iBest Awards, the biggest award in Brazilian internet. In 2001, 2002 and 2006, the portal was TOP3, in 2002, 2003 and 2004 TOP5 and in 2000 and 2005 TOP10.

In 2006, the project improved the range of its music content, creating more VIP Services and increasing the database with Artists, Lyrics, Chords, Music Radios, Music Videos, Artists Pictures and other content.

Until 2011, the website was independent, with no big partnerships. However, in 2011 the portal started a partnership with XPG, a free site and blog creation portal. At the same time the portal hit 100,000 users, and changed its URL to www.musiconline.xpg.com.br.

The Music Online Records portal now has around 1.5 million unique visitors per month, and has increased its content with partnerships with various other websites, such as Grátis Música, Ouvir Músicas Grátis, and others, some of which provide part of the portal's content, such as an Online Games channel.

As of September 27, 2012, the portal contains 110,000 artists, and has 110,000 registered users.
