= Pelé law =

Brazilian tax law

The Pelé law is a Brazilian law that forces professional sports clubs to observe business law and pay tax within two years. It is named after the country's former footballer turned Brazilian Minister for Sports, Pelé.

== Introduction ==
On March 24, 1998, Law N. 9.615/98 stipulates that by 2001, clubs can sign a maximum five-year contract with a player when they turn 16 and stand to receive only a "penalty fee" of up to 100 times their monthly wage if they leaves before then. If a player fulfils the contract without renewing then they can leave and join a new club as a free agent. The previous club receives no transfer fee or compensation in this transaction with the player's new club.

The law banned non-compete agreements in Brazilian football. A 2025 study found that the ban on non-compete agreements raised salaries for older players while reducing them for younger players.

The introduction of Pelé law also permits the formation of independent leagues by sports clubs across Brazil, which was a notion not previously allowed under the governance of the Brazilian Football Confederation.

== The original aspects of Pelé law ==
As referred to above, Pelé law regulates all aspects of sports in Brazil. This law embraces general rules about Brazilian sports law, regardless of the sports modality in question.

Due to its comprehensive nature we will restrict our analysis to the most controversial aspects. We will not discuss some aspects of Pelé law, such as disciplinary codes, Brazilian internal sports organization, sports courts composing, gambling regulations and other.

This analysis includes the following aspects: (i) establishment of leagues; (ii) establishment of for profit sports enterprise organizations; (iii) labor contracts rules; (iv) Arena; and (v) insurance policies for athletes.

=== Establishment of leagues ===
Article 20 of Pelé law and its 5 subsections regulate the establishment of leagues. The caput of this article allows clubs that take part in any national or regional competition and are members of the Brazilian National Sports System to found leagues.

These leagues will be private legal entities, and may, among other issues, negotiate on behalf of their members, sponsorship agreements, advertising and broadcasting contracts.

The establishment of leagues must be notified to the national sports administration entities ("NSAE") such as federations and confederations and such leagues are totally independent from the NSAE. Since the leagues are independent from the referred to entities, these are not allowed to interfere with the league private matters. Affiliation with a league does not imply in disaffiliation of the NSAE board. The club may participate in competitions organized by both entities, without legal restriction.

Arising from such legal permission, from 2001 football clubs started to organize themselves in leagues, which lead to the weakening of “CBF” (Brazilian Football Confederation) political power, for that body would no longer organize the Brazilian football championship, being left to organize solely the Brazil Cup, and being responsible for the national team.

However, aiming to avoid confrontation with CBF, and consequently with FIFA, as well as avoiding the possibility of being forbidden to take part in the Copa Libertadores, the teams taking part in the Brazilian Professional Football League agreed that the Brazilian Championship in 2002 will be organized and promoted by the League jointly with CBF.

=== Establishment of for-profit sports enterprise organizations ===
According to articles 27 and 27A in Pelé law, any club – be it of football or not – has the right to shift into a corporation, such change not being mandatory. Differing from Spain and Portugal, there is no specific modality of a company destined exclusively to sports clubs in Brazil. There is no such a legal entity as called a "sports joint stock company".

In case a club should have the interest in a total change - or a change specifically in its football or volleyball department - into a corporation, the model adopted could be any of those as foreseen by law. That is, on deciding to change into a corporation, the club can make an option for a Stock Company, a Limited Liability Company, a Foundation, among other.

Following the established in FIFA Statute (article 7, N.5), taking into consideration the ENIC case, and aiming to reassure the "incertitude sportive", Law N. 9.981/00 has imposed a veto to any simultaneous participation of an individual or a corporation in the capital stock of two or more clubs disputing the same professional competition.

Such veto also embraces the joint ownership investments, indirect capital participation, and relatives ownership in sports clubs. The sponsorship in shirts and the administration of trademark and sports events ("stadiums") exploitation are counted out of this veto.

Weird as it can be, that same article brings the prohibition of companies granted with the exploitation of radio and television services, be it open television or cable, to sponsor any sports club.

=== Professional athlete's labor contract ===
Article 28 of Pelé law stipulates the most relevant aspects of the professional athlete's labor contract (PALC), that are:

1. all labor contracts must be written and co-signed by athlete and a club, or a club enterprise;
2. have a specific and determinate term;
3. payment for the service must be clearly stated in the contract; and
4. penalty clause in cases of defaulting, breaching of contract and unilateral rescission of the contract.

The absence of any of above mentioned aspects will nullify the contract. A valid contract is formed only if both parties intend the act of signing to be the last act in the formation of a binding contract.

The requirement of a written contract implies that the athlete must be able to understand its terms and sign his or her name and also to avoid discussions about the existence of labor relation between the club and athlete.

The parties in a PALC must be an athlete and a club or a sports enterprise. This provision intends to hinder the action of agents. However, the law does not prohibit the ownership of a club by an agent.

The term of a PALC must be clearly stated in the contract, and pursuant to Article 30 of Pelé law the minimum term of a PALC is 3 (three) months and a maximum is 5 (five) years. However, a PALC may have its terms suspended if the athlete becomes unable to exercise his activity due to an occupational accident or disease, suffered in the club or while defending any team selection.

Article 31 of Pelé law provides that if the club has not effected partially or totally the payment for the services for 3 (three) consecutive months, the PALC can be rescinded by the athlete without the latter incurring in any fine. Moreover, pursuant article 32 of Pelé law, if the mentioned partial or total late payment lasts 2 (two) or more months, the athlete is allowed to stop playing for his team.

In case the athlete is asked to integrate the national or regional team, pursuant to article 41, the NSAE responsible for the national team shall be liable for the payment of the wages of the athletes for the services during the period that he/she will be under NSAE disposal.

The payment encompasses not only wages but also gratification, bonuses, benefits and reserves. Two other forms of payment may be included in the contract. These are known as (i) "bicho" and (ii) Arena.

"Bicho" is a money prize paid by the club to an athlete according to the team's performance, such as winning a championship, winning or drawing a match, qualifying to other championship phases, among others. The "bicho" may be established in the contract, but this is not usual.

Paragraph #2 of article 28 is one of the most controversial aspects of the Pelé law, once it has abolished the "passe". "Passe" was a legal determination that an athlete remains "tied" to the club even after the termination of a labor contract. Therefore, a tie-release amount was due to the club by another club if the latter wished to offer the athlete a new labor contract. Pursuant article 93 of Pelé law, the abolishment of "passe" only took effectiveness on March 24, 2001.

After the extinction of the "passe", what will keep the athlete bound to a football club is his labor contract, and at the final term of this the athlete will be free to change teams without payment of any indemnification whatsoever to his former club.

However, in case the athlete wishes to change clubs during the effectiveness of his contract, or in case the club wishes to release the athlete during the contract effectiveness, the payment of penalty for rescission shall be due, according to the contract provisions for such events.

According to paragraph 3 of article 38 in Pelé law, the amount of the penalty clause is freely established by the parties entering the contract, but shall be limited to 100 times the annual remuneration agreed to. Paragraph 4 of that same article establishes an automatic annual reduction on the penalty clause. On the first year of the accomplished contract, the penalty clause shall have a reduction of 10%; on the second year, the reduction shall be of 20%; on the third year, 40%; and on the fourth year, 80%.

According to Pelé law, the limit of the penalty clause and the referred to reductions will only be applicable in the transfers between Brazilian clubs. When such transfer occurs to foreign clubs, the amount of the penalty clause is of free stipulation.

There are two more exceptions to the amount of the penalty clause, being both of them only applicable in the event of the club having formed the player from its base categories:

1. In this case, the maximum amount for the penalty clause, in the rescission of a labor contract during its effectiveness, is no longer of 100 times the annual remuneration, but increases to 200 times such value; and
2. If at the end of the labor contract, for the period of 6 months as counted from the end of the contract, and provided the club continues paying that athlete's wages, the amount for the penalty clause can be up to 150 times the contracted annual remuneration.

=== Arena (broadcast rights) ===
Arena is a right that the club has due to the use of its image during a match. The club has the right to negotiate the broadcasting of its matches and participation on championships as established in the caput of article 42 of Pelé law. However, pursuant to paragraph # 1 of the same article, 20% (twenty per cent) of the income related to the broadcasting of the matches must be equally distributed to all Athletes of the team.

The amounts received as transfer of the broadcasting rights are not considered wages, therefore they cannot be used as basis for calculation of the penalty clause established in article 28 of Pelé law as explained above.

=== Insurance policies for athletes ===
Article 45 of Pelé law obliges the club to insure all its Athletes. The relevant insurance policies must cover personal and occupational accidents. Pelé law provides that the indemnity must correspond to the negotiated annual wages of the athlete.

== Modifications to the law ==
By Oct 2002, for being a controversial law, given it changed drastically the football culture in Brazil, Pelé law has been suffering mutilations since its promulgation. In less than 4 years of being in force, the law has already been through 3 major alterations, most of them based financial and political interests, never sports ones. Only 58% of the original text remains.
