= Ernesto Matozzi =

Argentine footballer

Personal information
- Date of birth: 19 May 1895
- Date of death: 2 April 1964 (aged 68)
- Position: Defender

International career
Years	Team	Apps	(Gls)
1916–1923	Argentina	24	(1)

Ernesto Matozzi (19 May 1895 – 2 April 1964) was an Argentine footballer. He played in 24 matches for the Argentina national football team from 1916 to 1923. He was also part of Argentina's squad for the 1917 South American Championship.
