= Carmen da Silva =

Brazilian psychoanalyst and journalist

- Born: 1919; Rio Grande, Rio Grande do Sul, Brazil
- Died: 1985
- Occupation: journalist

Carmen da Silva (31 December 1919 – 29 April 1985) was a Brazilian psychoanalyst and journalist, forerunner of the feminism in Brazil. She has been considered "a symbol of modernization of the press and of the contemporary Brazilian society". Together with other Brazilian female intellectuals, she was a pioneer in addressing and writing about the "woman question" or the women's condition in Brazilian society.

== Biography ==
Da Silva was born in Rio Grande, Rio Grande do Sul. Once she started working as a journalist, she began to popularize feminism in Brazil through her articles in magazines with wide female readership. Between 1963 and 1984, uninterruptedly, she wrote the column "A arte de ser mulher" ("The art of being a woman") in Editora Abril's Revista Claudia magazine. The column foredated some of the issues later appropriated by the Brazilian feminists, like use of pill, inclusion of women in labour market and divorce, among others.

Da Silva's activism was notable because the feminist agenda did not receive support from among those who toppled the dictatorship due to the idea that women's rights undermined the general political struggle. Da Silva worked to ensure that women's condition and rights received more media coverage. For instance, she published criticisms on issues such as the requirement for virginity only on women as well as violence against women. Her efforts alongside the works of other feminist journalists such as Irede Cardoso and Maria Carneiro da Cunha, pressured newspaper and broadcast networks to expand the media spaces reserved for women's voices and women's issues. Her crusade in fighting prejudices in the newsrooms was documented in Helen de Paiva Ramos' accounts of the women who helped change Brazilian journalism.

== Works ==
- A Arte de Ser Mulher - Um Guia Moderno Para o Seu Comportamento ("The art of being a woman - A modern guide to her behaviour"), 1967
- O Homem e a Mulher no Mundo Moderno ("Man and Woman in the Modern World"), 1969
- Sangue sem dono ("Blood without owner"), 1984
- Histórias Híbridas de uma Senhora de Respeito ("Hybrid histories of a respectful lady", autobiography), 1984

=== Anthology ===
- CIVITTA, Laura (ed.). O melhor de Carmen da Silva ("The best of Carmen da Silva"), 1994.
