= Arlindo Pacheco =

Brazilian footballer

Personal information
- Full name: Arlindo Correia Pacheco
- Date of birth: 30 December 1899

International career
Years	Team	Apps	(Gls)
1919	Brazil	1	(2)

Arlindo Correia Pacheco (born 30 December 1899, date of death unknown) was a Brazilian footballer who played as a forward. He played in one match for the Brazil national football team in 1919. He was also part of Brazil's squad for the 1919 South American Championship.
