= Josimar =

Josimar is a given name. It may refer to:

- Josimar (footballer, born 1961), Josimar Higino Pereira, Brazilian football right-back
- Josimar (footballer, born 1972), Josimar de Carvalho Ferreira, Brazilian football forward
- Josimar (footballer, born 1984), Josimar da Silva Martins, Brazilian football striker
- Josimar (footballer, born 1986), Josimar Rosado da Silva Tavares, Brazilian football defensive midfielder
- Josimar (footballer, born 1987), Josimar Rodrigues Souza Roberto, Brazilian football striker
- Josimar (footballer, born 1988), Josimar Moreira Matos de Souza, Brazilian football forward
- Josimar Atoche (born 1989), Peruvian football midfielder
- Josimar Ayarza (born 1987), Panamanian basketball player
- Josimar Heredia (born 1993), Mexican football centre-back
- Josimar Lima (born 1989), Cape Verdean football centre-back
- Josimar Melo (born 1954), Brazilian food and wine journalist
- Josimar Mosquera (born 1982), Colombian football centre-back
- Josimar Quiñonez (born 1987), Colombian football defender
- Josimar Quintero (born 1997), Ecuadorian football midfielder
- Josimar Vargas (born 1990), Peruvian football midfielder
- Vozinha (born 1986), Josimar José Évora Dias, Cape Verdean football goalkeeper

== Other uses ==
- Josimar (magazine), Norwegian football magazine named after the player born in 1961
