= Brazilian football golden generation =

Periods of time in Brazilian association football

The Brazil Golden Generation refers to several distinct periods in the history of the Brazil national football team during which the country produced exceptionally talented squads that dominated international football. Unlike most national teams, whose success is typically associated with a single generation of players, Brazil has produced multiple golden generations across different decades while maintaining its status as one of football's leading nations.

Brazil is the most successful team in the FIFA World Cup and won the tournament five times. Three titles came during the nation's generations, while a generation of the 1980s is regarded as one of the best teams never to be champions.

The development of these generations has been closely linked to Brazil's footballing identity, characterised by creativity, flair and technical skill. Throughout the second half of the twentieth century and into the early twenty-first century, Brazil consistently produced players regarded among the greatest of their era, including Pelé, Garrincha, Zico, Sócrates, Romário, Ronaldo, Rivaldo, Ronaldinho and Kaká.

== Background ==
Since its emergence as an international football power in the 1950s, Brazil has been synonymous with attacking football and technical excellence. The national team's style, commonly referred to as jogo bonito ("the beautiful game"), emphasises creativity, improvisation and individual skill while maintaining collective cohesion.

Unlike many successful national teams, whose achievements are concentrated within a single era, Brazil has repeatedly regenerated elite squads capable of competing for major honours. These successive generations were built upon a vast domestic talent pool and a football culture that encouraged technical development from an early age.

Although historians differ on the exact periods that constitute Brazil's golden generations, three eras are most widely recognised: the World Cup-winning teams between 1958 and 1970, the highly acclaimed but trophyless side of the 1980s, and the generation that dominated world football between 1994 and 2006.

== History ==
=== First generation (1958–1970) ===
Brazil's first Golden Generation is widely regarded as one of the greatest in football history. Following disappointment at the 1950 FIFA World Cup, the emergence of a remarkable group of players transformed Brazil into the dominant force in international football.

Led by Pelé, Garrincha, Didi, Vavá, Mário Zagallo, Nilton Santos, Zito and captain Hilderaldo Bellini, Brazil won its first FIFA World Cup in 1958, defeating hosts Sweden 5–2 in the final. Pelé, aged just 17, became an international sensation after scoring six goals, including a hat-trick in the semi-final and a brace in the final.

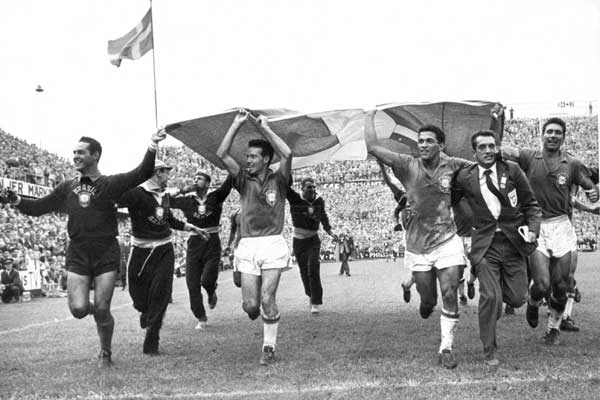
The Brazilian team celebrating their first World Cup title.

At the 1962 FIFA World Cup, Brazil successfully defended its title despite losing Pelé to injury during the group stage. Garrincha assumed leadership of the team, producing a series of outstanding performances as Brazil defeated Czechoslovakia in the final to become only the second nation to retain the World Cup.

After an unexpected group-stage elimination in 1966, Brazil returned four years later with a squad often regarded as the greatest national team ever assembled. Featuring Pelé alongside Carlos Alberto Torres, Jairzinho, Tostão, Gérson and Rivellino, Brazil won every match at the 1970 FIFA World Cup, culminating in a 4–1 victory over Italy in the final. Pelé won his third World Cup, becoming the only player in history to achieve the feat, while Jairzinho scored in every match of the tournament.

Across this period, Brazil won three World Cups in four tournaments, establishing itself as the leading nation in world football and creating a lasting tactical and cultural legacy. The 1970 Team is considered the best Brazil team of all time.

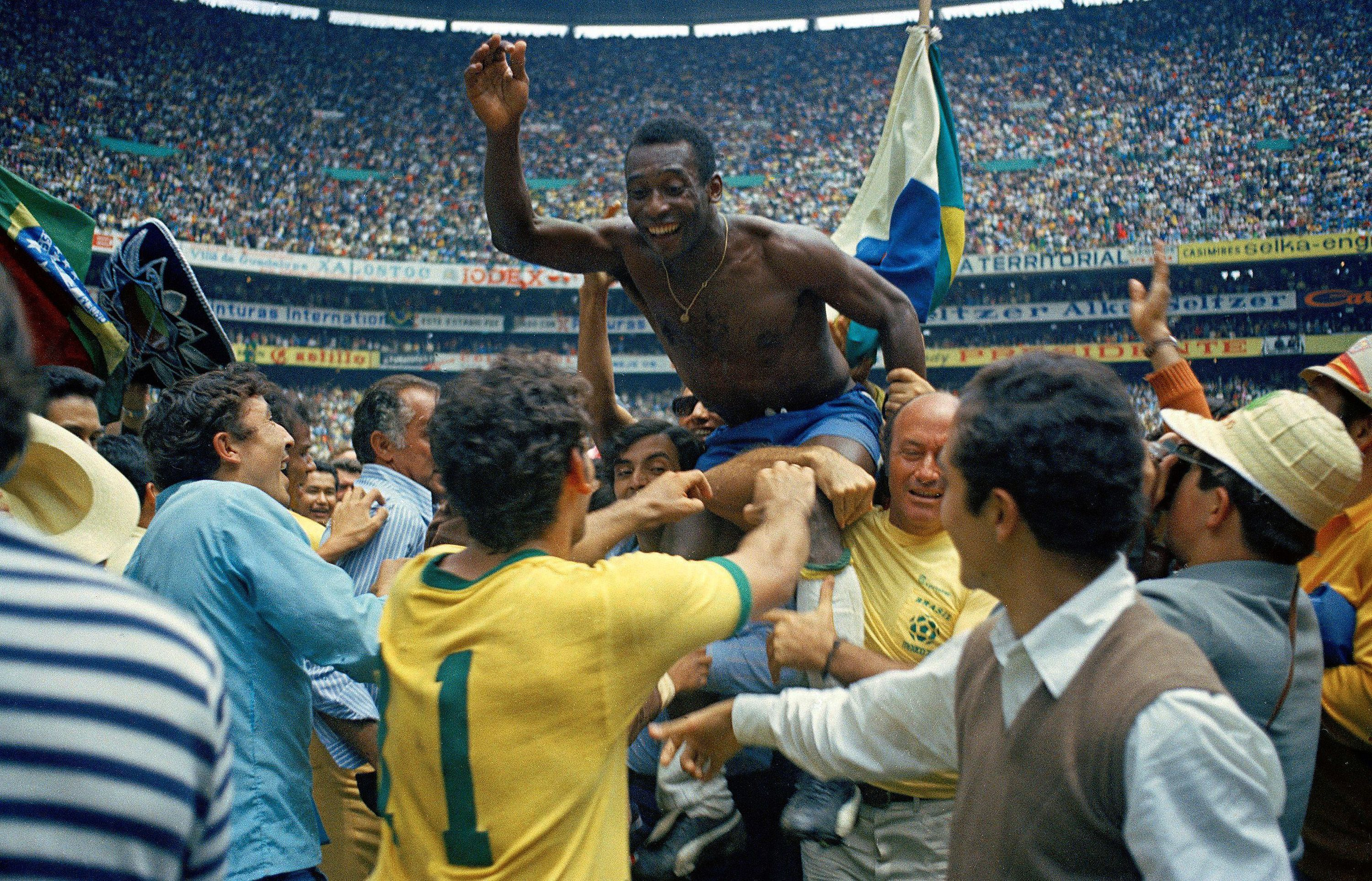
Pelé celebrating the World Cup win in 1970.

=== Second generation (1982–1986) ===
Following a period of transition during the 1970s, Brazil produced another generation centred around Zico, Sócrates, Falcão, Éder, Júnior and later Careca. Managed by Telê Santana, the team became renowned for its attacking football, technical quality and creative midfield play.

At the 1982 FIFA World Cup, Brazil won all three group-stage matches before defeating defending champions Argentina in the second group phase. However, they were eliminated after a memorable 3–2 defeat to Italy, in which Paolo Rossi scored a hat-trick. The match has since become one of the most famous in World Cup history.

Brazil again entered the 1986 FIFA World Cup among the favourites. Led by Zico, Sócrates and Careca, they reached the quarter-finals before losing to France on penalties.

Despite failing to win a major international trophy, the 1982–86 side is frequently regarded as one of the greatest national teams never to win the World Cup. Their style of football, and their technical brilliance, have continued to influence football long after the generation's conclusion.

=== Third generation (1994–2006) ===
Brazil returned to the summit of world football during the 1990s and early 2000s with another exceptional generation of players. The era began with victory at the 1994 FIFA World Cup, where a team led by Romário, Bebeto, Dunga and goalkeeper Cláudio Taffarel defeated Italy on penalties to claim Brazil's fourth world title.

The squad remained among the world's strongest throughout the decade. Brazil reached the final of the 1998 FIFA World Cup, where they lost to hosts France, while also winning the 1997 Copa América and 1999 Copa América. During this period, Ronaldo established himself as one of the world's leading players, winning the FIFA World Player of the Year award three times.

The generation reached its peak at the 2002 FIFA World Cup, where Brazil won all seven matches to secure a record fifth world title. The attacking trio of Ronaldo, Rivaldo and Ronaldinho—popularly known as the "Three Rs"—combined for fourteen goals during the tournament. Ronaldo finished as the top scorer with eight goals, including both in the 2–0 victory over Germany in the final. Ronaldo also won the Golden Shoe as the tournament's leading scorer with eight goals.

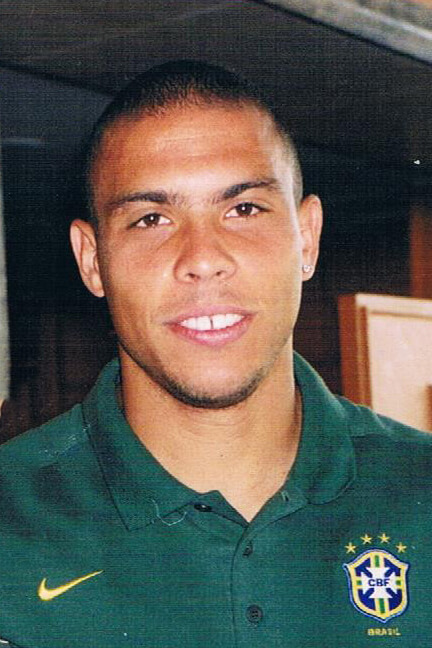
Brazil's Ronaldo in the 2002 FIFA World Cup

The squad also featured world-class players including Cafu, Roberto Carlos, Lúcio, Gilberto Silva, Kaká, Dida, Zé Roberto, Adriano and Robinho. Brazil additionally won the 2004 Copa América and the 2005 FIFA Confederations Cup, entering the 2006 FIFA World Cup as favourites before being eliminated by France in the quarter-finals.

Out of the players of this generation, Ronaldo, Rivaldo, Ronaldinho and Kaká were Ballon d'Or winners.

== Legacy ==
Brazil's golden generations have collectively shaped the history of international football more than those of any other nation. Between 1958 and 2002, Brazil won five FIFA World Cups, reached seven World Cup finals and consistently produced players regarded among the greatest of all time.

Beyond their achievements, these generations popularised an attacking philosophy centred on creativity, technical excellence and expressive football. The image of jogo bonito became inseparable from Brazilian football and has influenced coaches, players and supporters across the world.

== See also ==
- History of the Brazil national football team
- List of FIFA World Cup winning players
