= History of the Brazil national football team =

The history of the Brazil national football team began with the team's first international match in 1914. Brazil played in the first FIFA World Cup in 1930. The Brazil national team has been successful throughout its history, winning the World Cup five times since 1958.

== History ==
=== Early history (1916–57) ===
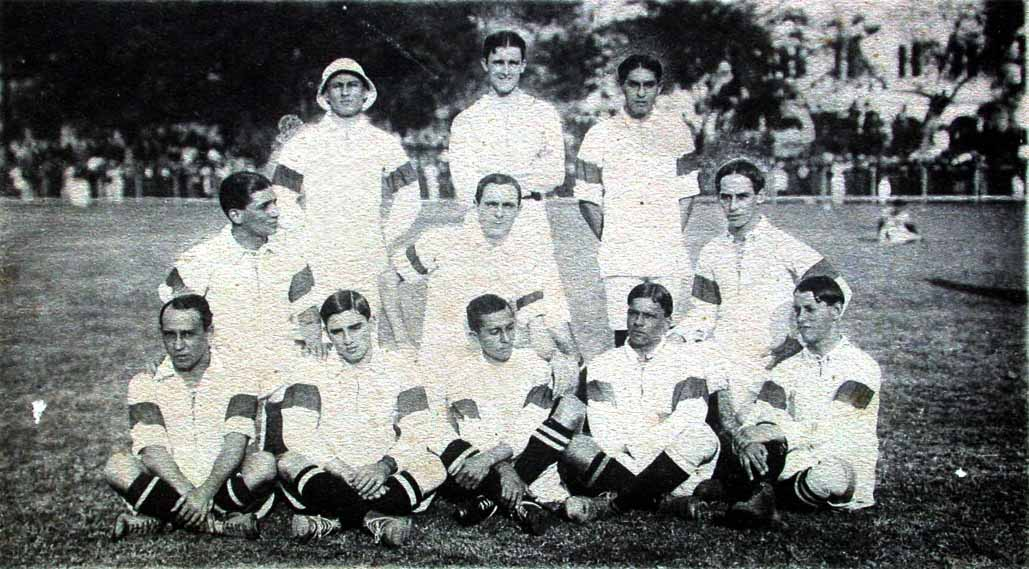
The first Brazil national team ever, 1914.

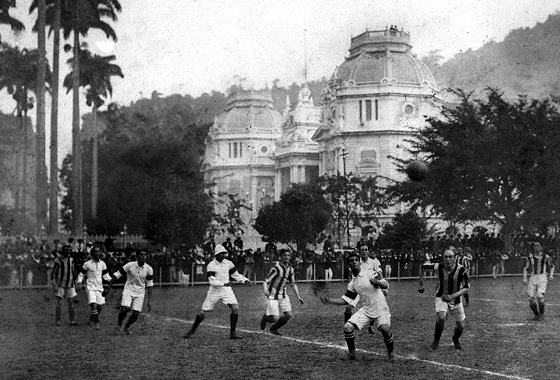
Brazil's first match at home against Exeter City in 1914.

It is generally believed that the first game of the Brazil national football team was a 1914 match between a Rio de Janeiro and São Paulo select team and the English club Exeter City, held in Fluminense's stadium. Brazil won 2–0 with goals by Oswaldo Gomes and Osman, though it is claimed that the match was a 3–3 draw. The line-up for that first match was: Nélson I, Pennaforte, Alemão, Mica, Nesi, Dino I, Paschoal, Torteroli, Nilo, Coelho, Amaro.

In contrast to its future success, the national team's early appearances were not brilliant, partly because of an internal strife between Brazilian football associations over professionalism, which rendered the Brazilian Football Confederation unable to field full-strength teams.

Other early matches played during that time include several friendly games against Argentina (being defeated 3–0), Chile (first in 1916) and Uruguay (first on 12 July 1916).

After its debut against Exeter City, Brazil did not play against a European team until 1928, when the squad smashed Motherwell of Scotland 5–0 on 24 June 1928. Other European teams that Brazil played included Hungarian side Ferencváros. Led by the goalscoring abilities of Arthur Friedenreich, they were victorious at home in the South American Championships in 1919, repeating their victory, also at home, in 1922.

In 1930, Brazil travelled to play in the first World Cup, held in Uruguay. The squad defeated Bolivia but lost to Yugoslavia, being eliminated from the competition. They lost in the first round to Spain in 1934 in Italy, but reached the semi-finals in France in 1938, being defeated 2–1 by eventual winners he World Cup. Prior to the match, Brazilian newspaper O Mundo prematurely declared Brazil "the world champions". In one of the biggest upsets in football history, however, Uruguay scored with only 11 minutes remaining to win the match, and the Cup, in a game infamously known as "the Maracanzo". The match led to a period of national mourning, with Brazilian playwright Nelson Rodrigues later saying, "Everywhere has its irremediable national catastrophe, something like a Hiroshima. Our catastrophe, our Hiroshima, was the defeat by Uruguay in 1950."

For the 1954 World Cup in Switzerland, the Brazil national team was then almost completely renovated, with the team colours changed from all white to the yellow, blue and green of the national flag, so as to forget the Maracanazo, but still had a group of star players, including Nílton Santos, Djalma Santos and Didi. Brazil reached the quarter-final, where they were beaten 4–2 by tournament favourites Hungary in one of the ugliest matches in football history; it would become infamous as the Battle of Berne.

=== The Golden Era with Pelé (1958–70) ===
==== 1958 World Cup ====
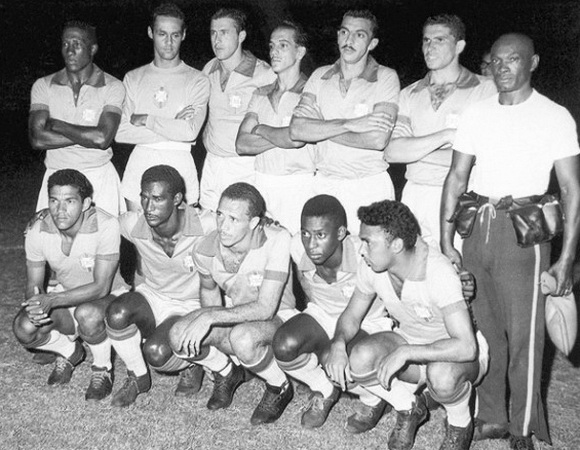
The Brazil national team at the 1959 Copa América.

Brazil was determined to put right their failures in the previous two world cups, in particular the loss in the 1950 final to Uruguay. With substantial financial support from the technocratic government of Juscelino Kubitschek government they prepared for the 1958 World Cup in Stockholm like no other team had before. A delegation led by the team’s doctor, Hilton Gosling, assessed 25 sites in Sweden before choosing a training base in Hindås a resort town near Gothenburg. A scout was also sent to Europe to watch the qualifying matches a year before the tournament was set to begin. Brazil's head coach, Vicente Feola, imposed strict list of 40 things that they were not allowed to do, including wearing hats or using umbrellas, smoking while wearing official uniforms and talking to the press outside of specified times. To reduce distractions the Brazilians attempted without success to have a local nudist colony closed for the duration of the tournament. However they were successful in having all 28 female members of staff at the hotel the team was staying at sent home for the duration of their stay.The players were put through a rigorous fitness regime, while their backroom staff included not only Gosling but also a psychologist as memories of 1950 still affected some players and a dentist. A dentist was thought necessary as most of the players came from humble origins, so there was no desire to have their performance suffer from infections due to the lack of dental treatment.

Brazil were drawn in the toughest group, alongside England, the Soviet Union and Austria. They beat Austria 3–0 in their first match, then drew 0–0 with England. Brazil had been worried about their match with the USSR, who had exceptional fitness and were one of the favourites to win the tournament; their strategy was to take risks at the beginning of the match to try to score an early goal. Before the match, the leaders of the team, Hilderaldo Bellini, Nílton Santos and Didi spoke to coach Vicente Feola and persuaded him to make three substitutions that were crucial for Brazil to defeat the Soviets and win the Cup: Zito, Garrincha and Pelé, who is widely regarded as the greatest footballer of all time, would start playing against the Soviets.

From the kick off, they passed the ball to Garrincha, who beat three players before hitting the post with a shot. They kept up the pressure relentlessly, and after three minutes, which were later described as "the greatest three minutes in the history of football", Vavá gave Brazil the lead. They won the match by 2–0. Pelé scored the only goal of their quarter-final match against Wales, and they beat France 5–2 in the semi-final. Brazil then beat hosts Sweden in the final 5–2, winning their first World Cup and becoming the first nation to win a World Cup title outside of its own continent. A celebrated fact was that Feola would sometimes take naps during training sessions and close his eyes during matches, giving the impression that he was asleep. Because of this, Didi was sometimes said to be the real coach of the team, as he commanded the midfield.

==== 1962 World Cup ====
In the 1962 World Cup in Chile, Brazil earned its second title with Garrincha as the star player, a mantle and responsibility laid upon him after the regular talisman, Pelé, was injured during the second group match against Czechoslovakia and unable to play for the remainder of the tournament.

==== 1966 World Cup ====
At the 1966 World Cup in England, the preparation of the team was affected by political influences. All the major Brazilian clubs wanted their players included in Brazil's team, to give them more exposure. In the final months of preparation for the World Cup, the coach Vicente Feola was working with 46 players, of which only 22 would go to England; this caused significant internal dispute and psychological pressure on the players and managing staff. The result was that, in 1966, Brazil had their worst performance in a World Cup. Although they played all of their matches in the same stadium in the same city (the city of Liverpool's Goodison Park), Brazil became the second nation to be eliminated in the first round while holding the World Cup crown after Italy in 1950. After the 2002, 2010, 2014, and 2018 World Cups, France, Italy, Spain, and Germany respectively were also added to this list.

Another perhaps bigger issue was that Pelé, who had possibly been at the height of his career at this stage, was being chopped off at seemingly every opportunity in the group matches. The 1966 tournament was remembered for its excessively physical play, and Pelé was one of the players most affected by such play. After becoming the first player ever to score in three World Cups, with a direct free kick against Bulgaria, he had to rest due to fatigue for the match against Hungary, which Brazil lost. He then faced Portugal, and several violent tackles by the Portuguese defenders caused him to leave the match and the tournament. Brazil also lost this match and was eliminated in the first round of the World Cup for the first time since 1934. After the tournament, Pelé declared that he did not wish to play in the World Cup again. Nonetheless, he returned in 1970.

==== 1970 World Cup ====
Brazil won its third World Cup in Mexico, with the 1970 World Cup. It fielded what has since then often been considered the best football squad ever, led by Pelé in his last World Cup finals, captain Carlos Alberto Torres, Jairzinho, Tostão, Gérson and Rivellino.

Brazil's results in 1970 were as follows:

Group 3
Brazil 4–1 Czechoslovakia
Brazil 1–0 England
Brazil 3–2 Romania
Quarterfinals
Brazil 4–2 Peru
Semifinals
Brazil 3–1 Uruguay
Final
Brazil 4–1 Italy

They won all six of their games, with all but two of their matches were won by two or more goals. The speedy Jairzinho was the second top scorer with seven goals (he had scored in all six games), while Pelé finished with four goals. Brazil played all six of their matches – with the exception of the final – in Guadalajara, the final being played in Mexico City. As a result, Brazil lifted the Jules Rimet trophy for the third time (the first nation to do so), which meant that they were allowed to keep it, as had been stipulated at the time of the World Cup's inception in 1930. A replacement was then commissioned, though it would be 24 years before Brazil next won it.

=== The dry spell (1971–93) ===
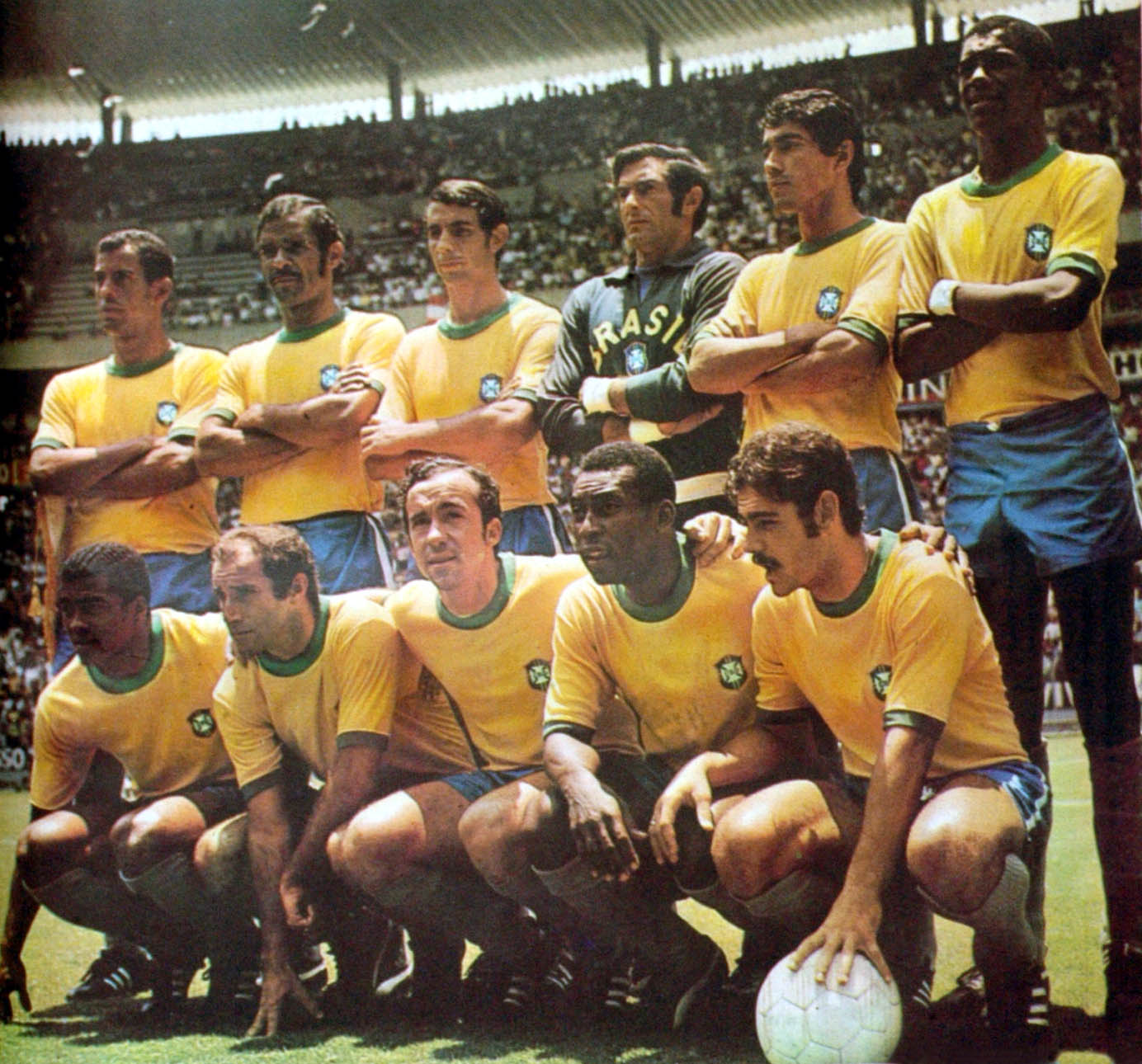
The 1970 FIFA World Cup-winning Brazil team.

After the international retirement of Pelé and other stars from the 1970 squad, Brazil was not able to overcome the Netherlands' Total Football in the 1974 World Cup. The generation of 1974 could not defend their title, finishing in fourth place after failing to achieve victory against a strong Poland team.

In the second group stage of the 1978 World Cup, Brazil was competing with tournament host Argentina for top spot and a place in the finals. In their last group match, Brazil defeated Poland 3–1 to go to the top of the group with a goal difference of +5. In this tournament, Brazil had many challenges on and off the pitch to contend with: for their group stage matches, all of which took place at the Estadio José María Minella in Mar del Plata, which had an atrocious pitch and was very difficult to play on. There were rumors that the Argentine organizers had deliberately sabotaged the pitch to make it nearly unplayable for the Brazilians.

During one of their group stage matches against Sweden, Brazil had scored a goal in the last seconds of stoppage time, but the head referee, Welshman Clive Thomas blew his whistle right before Zico headed the ball went into the net from a corner-kick, denying Brazil a 2–1 victory and leaving them with a 1–1 draw. In the second round-robin phase, Brazil beat Poland 3–1 for the first scheduled game of 21 June, which started at 4:45 p.m. Argentina's match, which started on the same day at 7:15 p.m. went into their final match of that round against Peru knowing how many goals they needed to win by in order to win the phase and qualify for the final match. Although they had the same record as Brazil (1 win, 1 draw) before the Seleção's game against Poland, Brazil were in first place in that round on goal difference, having scored two more goals than Argentina. But in its last group match, the Argentine squad defeated Peru 6–0 and thus with the higher second round goal difference of three more goals scored than the Brazilians, the Argentines qualified for the final match, in a match accused of ultimately-unproven match fixing by the Argentine military government in place at the time. The Brazilian team won their third place match against Italy in Buenos Aires, and were the only team to remain unbeaten in the tournament.

At the 1982 World Cup in Spain, Brazil were the tournament favorites, and romped through the early part of the tournament by beating their group stage opponents the Soviet Union 2–1, Scotland 4–1 and New Zealand 4–0 in the southern cities of Seville and Málaga. After moving to a second round of round-robin matches held at the Sarrià Stadium in Barcelona, they then easily beat a demoralized Argentina 3–1, which effectively booted their South American rivals out of the tournament, having previously lost to Italy 2–1. Brazil were slated to progress to the semi-finals, but a 3–2 defeat to Italy in one of the classic games in World Cup finals history, eliminated them from the tournament in the match that they refer to as "Sarrià's Disaster", referencing the stadium's name and the disappointment that followed. The 1982 team, with players like Sócrates, Zico, Falcão and Éder, is remembered as perhaps the greatest team never to win a World Cup.

Telê Santana and several players from 1982 returned to play in the 1986 World Cup, hosted by Mexico. The players of 1986 were older but still capable of an enchanting performance. They were troubled, however, by an injury Zico picked up prior to the tournament. Incessant questions about whether and when he could play undoubtedly had some negative effect on the team. Brazil were fortuitous in that, unlike nearly every other team in the tournament, they played all of their matches in this tournament in one stadium, the Estadio Jalisco in Guadalajara. They won all three of their group matches stage against Spain (1–0), Northern Ireland (3–0) and Algeria (1–0). After crushing Poland 4–0, Brazil met France in the quarter-finals in a match considered an absolute classic of Total Football. Zico came on in the second half (with the score 1–1), and Brazil was awarded a penalty late in the game, Brazil seemed set to win. But Zico, the hero of a whole generation of Brazilian football fans, missed the penalty, and after a goalless but exciting extra time, the match came down to a penalty shoot-out. Zico managed to score from his penalty, but Júlio César and Sócrates missed the goal in their turns, and though French captain Michel Platini sent his effort over the crossbar, Brazil was nevertheless eliminated from the 1986 World Cup.

In the 1990 World Cup, held in Italy, Brazil was coached by Sebastião Lazaroni, who was hardly known before the Cup. With a defensive scheme, whose main symbol was midfielder Dunga, forward Careca and three full-backs, the team lacked creativity but made it to the second round. Like in Mexico, Brazil were again confined to one stadium, Juventus' Stadio delle Alpi in Turin. They won all three of their group stage matches against Sweden (2–1), Costa Rica (1–0) and Scotland (1–0), during playing the latter, a hard free-kick taken by Branco hit Scottish midfielder Murdo MacLeod in the head, knocking him out cold. They then had to face Argentina in their second round match. Against a weaker Argentine side, Brazil applied heavy pressure and had numerous chances to score, but Claudio Caniggia eventually found Brazil's net after a brilliant Diego Maradona assist, thereby eliminating Brazil.

=== Return to winning ways (1994–2002) ===
==== 1994 World Cup ====
Brazil, to the surprise of many, went 24 years without winning a World Cup or even participating in a final. This included 16 years without even making the round of eight, with their best result being third place in 1978. Their struggles ended at the 1994 tournament in the United States, where a solid, if unspectacular, side headed by Romário, Bebeto, Dunga, Taffarel and Jorginho, won the World Cup for a then-record fourth time. Playing all but two of their matches in California, highlights of their campaign included a 1–0 victory over the hosts United States in the round of 16, a sensational 3–2 win over the Netherlands in the quarter-finals in Dallas (often cited as the game of the tournament) and a 1–0 win over Sweden in the semi-finals. This set up a classic confrontation, Brazil vs. Italy, in the final at the Rose Bowl, just outside of Los Angeles. After a dour and unexciting 0–0 draw, penalty kicks loomed, and when Roberto Baggio lifted his penalty kick over the crossbar, Brazil was the champion once again. A new era of dominance had begun.

==== 1998 World Cup ====
Entering the tournament as defending champions, Brazil finished runner-up in the 1998 World Cup in France. After a very respectable campaign during which they beat the Netherlands on penalties in the semi-final following a 1–1 draw with goals from Ronaldo and Patrick Kluivert, the team lost to the host France 3–0 in the final played at the new Stade de France, just outside Paris in Saint-Denis. Brazilian marking at defensive set pieces was poor, and Zinedine Zidane was able to score two headed goals from France's corner kicks. Also, Brazil star Ronaldo suffered an epileptic seizure a few hours before the match. Many criticized the decision to reinstate him into the starting line-up as he put on a poor performance. Another reason that was given for Brazil's poor performance was lack of preparation. Brazil had not played in the play-offs and the team selection was made based on friendly matches without real competition. In addition, the injury to Romário, Ronaldo's preferred starting partner, prior to the tournament may have also played a factor.

==== 2002 World Cup ====
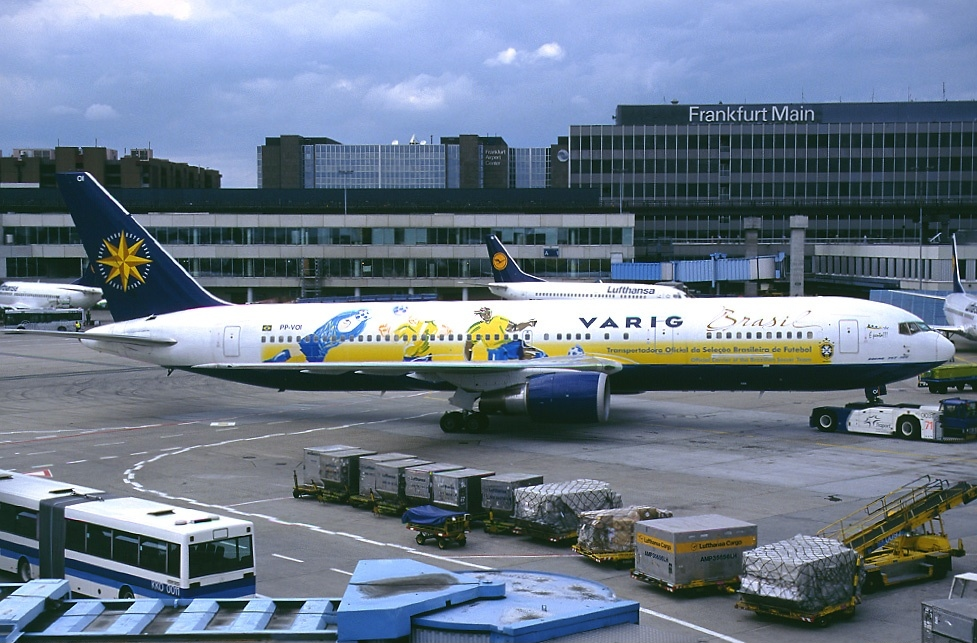
Brazil national football team airplane in 2002.

Fuelled by the "Three R's" (Ronaldo, Rivaldo and Ronaldinho), Brazil won its fifth championship at the 2002 World Cup, jointly held in South Korea and Japan. This happened despite a rather shaky qualifying tournament, which saw the national team drop to its lowest-ever FIFA ranking and only secure automatic qualification in the final round of group matches, largely because Paraguay and Uruguay both failed to win their own final matches.

The groupings appeared at first glance to favour Brazil; their adversaries would be Turkey, China PR and Costa Rica. In the end, a stronger-than-expected Turkey finished the tournament in third place. Brazil went on to beat all three opponents, scoring 11 goals and conceding only three, and topping the group. In Brazil's opening game against Turkey, Rivaldo fell to the ground clutching his face after Turkey's Hakan Ünsal had kicked the ball at his legs. Ünsal, who had already been booked, was sent off while Rivaldo jumped to his feet and continued playing. Rivaldo escaped suspension but was fined £5,180 for play-acting; he became the first player ever to be punished in FIFA's crackdown on diving. Brazil followed with a 4–0 win over China PR and a 5–2 win over Costa Rica.

Next, Brazil defeated Belgium 2–0 in the round of 16. Against England in the quarter-finals, Brazil won 2–1; Ronaldinho scored the winner with a free-kick and also assisted teammate Rivaldo for Brazil's first goal, but was sent off for stamping on the right ankle of England's Danny Mills. The semi-final was against Turkey, which Brazil had faced in its group. Again, this match was difficult, but Brazil won 1–0 with a goal by Ronaldo. Rivaldo had scored one goal in each of his preceding five games, but did not manage to hit the target in the sixth, and so could not repeat Jairzinho's great achievement in 1970 of scoring in every game of a World Cup.

The final was between two of the most successful teams in the competition's history: Germany and Brazil, played at the International Stadium in Yokohama, near Tokyo. Incredibly, the teams had never played each other in the World Cup before save for a match between Brazil and East Germany in the 1974 World Cup. German goalkeeper Oliver Kahn had been the tournament's best goalkeeper, but was not able to maintain his post unscathed in this match, as Ronaldo vanquished his demons from the previous Cup and scored both goals in the Brazil 2–0 triumph. Ronaldo also won the Golden Shoe as the tournament's leading scorer, though Kahn won the Golden Ball as the most outstanding player.

=== Parreira returns (2002–06) ===
During the 2003 FIFA Confederations Cup, Brazil were eliminated on goals scored against favourites Turkey. On 29 June 2005, Brazil won the Confederations Cup for the second time with an emphatic 4–1 victory over arch-rivals Argentina in Frankfurt. They also won another championship, the 2004 Copa América, in which they also defeated Argentina, this time in a penalty shoot-out.

==== 2006 World Cup ====
Manager Carlos Alberto Parreira built his side through a 4–2–2–2 formation. Nicknamed the "Magic Square" by Brazilian sport journalists, the attack was built around four extremely talented players: Ronaldo, Adriano, Kaká and Ronaldinho.

During the build-up to the tournament, star striker Ronaldo was suffering with several problems, most notably his fitness. After a two-month injury lay-off earlier in the season, the Real Madrid forward had gained a noticeable amount of weight, and was not as sharp and quick as he had been in the previous decade. He also suffered from blisters on his feet and a fever during training.

Despite winning the first two games, against Croatia (1–0) and Australia (2–0), the Magic Square did not show anything close to the flair and imagination that it had promised. Despite the reputation of the four attacking players, Brazil was struggling to break down their opponents and create chances, and only two of the forwards, Kaká and Adriano, had found themselves on the score-sheet. In the final group game, against Japan, Parreira made several changes, dropping several experienced players and bringing in relative youngsters, including Robinho and Cicinho, and dropped the Magic Square in favour of a more balanced formation. The changes were successful, and Brazil strolled to a comfortable 4–1 win against Japan. Ronaldo seemed to be finding his fitness and form, scoring twice and equalling the record for the most goals scored across all World Cups.

In the round of 16, Brazil beat Ghana 3–0; with the Magic Square restored, Ronaldo and Adriano both scored. Ronaldo's goal was his 15th in World Cup history, breaking the record. Despite Ronaldo's landmark and the comfortable scoreline, however, it was another unconvincing performance. Despite Perreira's reversion once again to a more balanced formation, with Ronaldo a lone striker supported by Kaká and Ronaldinho, Brazil was eliminated in the quarter-finals against France, losing 1–0 to a Thierry Henry goal in the second half. Led by a rejuvenated Zinedine Zidane and guarded by a resolute defence, France was barely threatened by Brazil; despite Ronaldo's best efforts, the striker's second-half effort was the only shot on target that Brazil managed. The game was also notable for being the first time that the Brazil team had been shut out in three consecutive matches against France, which now had a 2–1–1 all-time record including 1986, 1998 and 2006 World Cup matches.

After their early elimination, the defeated world champions were harshly criticized by the press and the fans. The media circulated images of the left wing-back Roberto Carlos tying his shoes while Thierry Henry ran unmarked to score the winning goal. Pelé blamed Parreira and the under-performing Ronaldinho for the team's early elimination.

=== Dunga period (2006–10) ===
1994 World Cup-winning captain Dunga was hired as Brazil's new team manager on 24 July 2006, almost immediately after the World Cup. Dunga's former teammate, Jorginho, was hired as his assistant. His first match in charge was against Norway, played in Oslo on 16 August 2006 which ended in a 1–1 draw. His second match was held against Argentina on September 3 in Arsenal's Emirates Stadium in London, in which Brazil won 3–0. On 5 September, they defeated Wales by 2–0 at Tottenham Hotspur's White Hart Lane ground. They later defeated Kuwaiti club Kuwait SC 4–0, Ecuador by 2–1 and had a 2–1 away win against Switzerland.

Dunga's first defeat as Brazil's manager was on 6 February 2007 in a friendly match against Portugal, which at that time was coached by former Brazil coach Luiz Felipe Scolari. In March 2007, Brazil bounced back from this with wins in friendly matches against Chile (4–0) and Ghana (1–0) in Sweden.

Unlike Parreira, Dunga focused on de-emphasizing individual players and treating them as equals. He did not only seek players in popular clubs such as Milan, Barcelona and Real Madrid, but searched the whole scope of Europe, finding individual talents such as Vágner Love and Dudu Cearense, who were playing for Russian club CSKA Moscow, and Elano, who was playing for Ukrainian club Shakhtar Donetsk. Of the four players who had been dubbed the Magic Square, Ronaldinho and Kaká were the only players who had a regular place in the Brazil squad. Adriano was called back into the squad for a friendly against Portugal in February 2007, which Brazil lost 0–2. Dunga did not select the last member of the Magic Square, Ronaldo. Instead, Luís Fabiano made the majority of appearances in the striker position.

==== 2007 Copa América ====
Brazil participated in the 2007 Copa América which was hosted by Venezuela. The team was placed in Group B with Mexico, Ecuador and Chile. Brazil surprisingly lost to Mexico 2–0 in their opening match, then bounced back with a comfortable 3–0 victory over Chile with three goals from Robinho, and won 1–0 against Ecuador, Robinho scoring on a penalty kick. They advanced to the quarter-finals, where they defeated Chile again, this time 6–1. The semi-final was against Uruguay, and after a 2–2 draw, Brazil won 5–4 on penalties. Their opponent in the final was Argentina, which had been the favourite to win, having won all its matches en route to the final. Brazil, however, scored early in the fourth minute with Júlio Baptista, and then in the 45th minute, when defender Roberto Ayala scored on an own goal. Later, in the 69th minute, substitute Dani Alves scored Brazil's third goal, making the scoreline 3–0. After the tournament, Robinho was awarded the Golden Boot in addition to being named the best player in the tournament.

==== 2009 FIFA Confederations Cup ====
Brazil won the 2009 Confederations Cup, held in South Africa. They started with a shaky 4–3 victory over Egypt, scoring a last-minute penalty – they had led 3–1 at half-time only for Egypt to pull level with two quick goals at the start of the second half. Egypt is credited as the only African team to score three goals against Brazil. Brazil comfortably beat the United States, as well as Italy, both via 3–0 scorelines. After beating South Africa in the semi-final with a late free-kick, they went on to a rematch against the United States in the final, where they had a massive comeback and won 3–2 after lagging 2–0 at half-time, to seal their third Confederations Cup title. Kaká was named as the player of the tournament and Luís Fabiano won the top goalscorer award with five goals in five matches.

==== 2010 FIFA World Cup qualification ====
After a 3–1 victory over Argentina in Rosario, on 5 September 2009, Brazil qualified for the 2010 World Cup. Brazil topped the CONMEBOL qualification with nine wins, seven draws and two losses; the two losses came during away matches in Bolivia and Paraguay. Brazil also went undefeated at home during the qualification.

==== 2010 FIFA World Cup ====
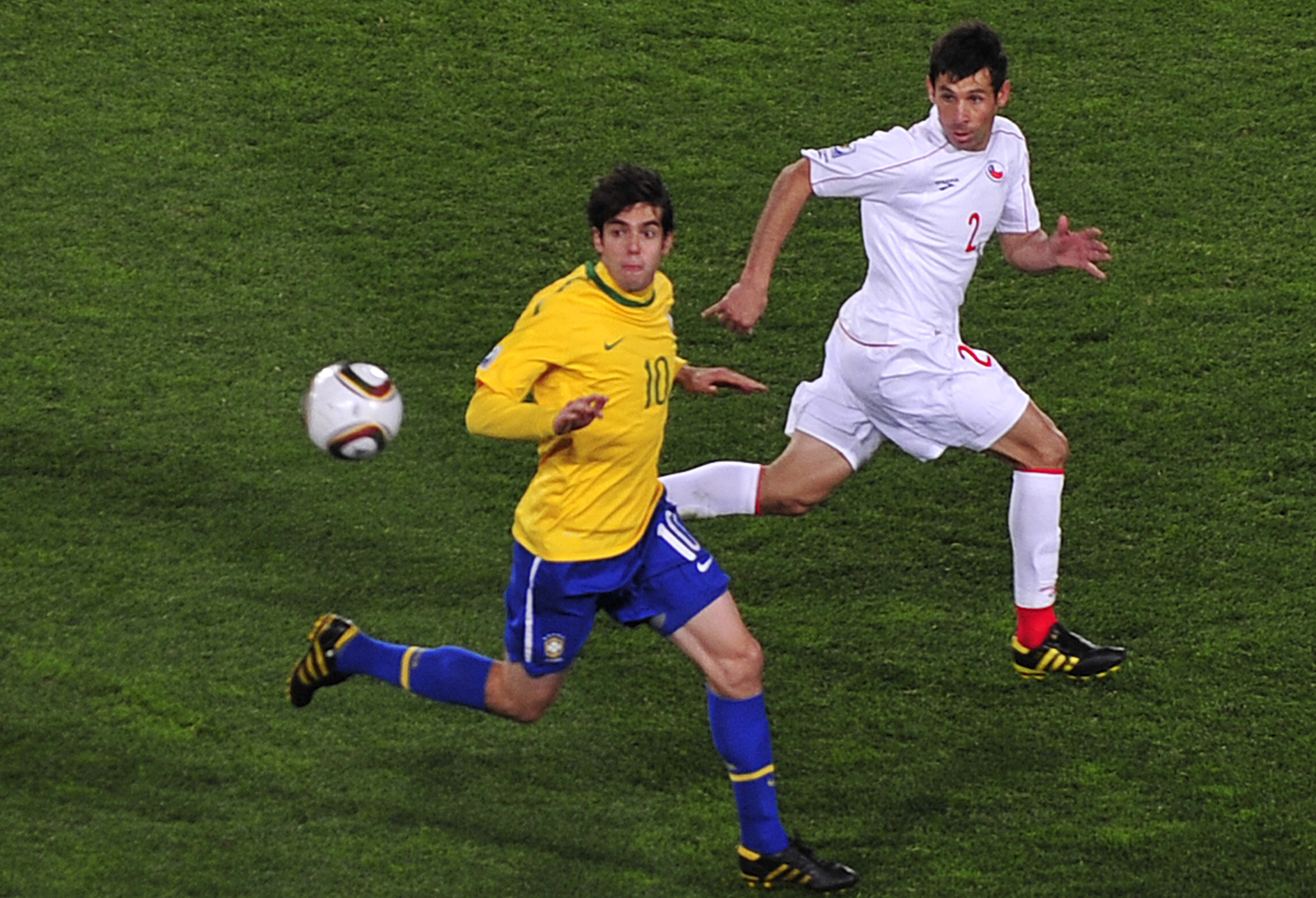
Brazil and Chile national teams in 2010.

On 4 December, Brazil was drawn into Group G, dubbed the "group of death". They played their first match against North Korea on 15 June 2010 and won 2–1. On 20 June, they played their second game against Ivory Coast and won 3–1, qualifying for the next round. Their last match against Portugal ended in a 0–0 draw. They then faced Chile in the round of 16; Juan, Luís Fabiano and Robinho scored goals to give Brazil a 3–0 win. In the quarter-final, they lost to the Netherlands 2–1 despite having gained an early lead.

=== After the 2010 World Cup (2010–12) ===
On 24 July 2010, Mano Menezes was named as the new Brazil coach, replacing Dunga, whose contract was not renewed following Brazil's World Cup campaign.

On 26 July 2010, Menezes announced his first 24-man squad, including ten debutants. Only four players from the 2010 World Cup team were named in the squad (Robinho, Dani Alves, Ramires and Thiago Silva). Players included in that squad but left out of the 23-man in the World Cup included Alexandre Pato of Milan, Lucas Leiva of Liverpool, Ganso of Santos and Sandro of Tottenham Hotspur. Menezes' first match was a 2–0 win over the United States. Neymar scored on his debut for the national team, and also won the man of the match award.

==== 2011 Copa América ====
At the 2011 Copa América, Brazil was put in Group B alongside Venezuela, Paraguay and Ecuador. In their first two games, they drew with Venezuela and Paraguay. In their last game, Brazil beat Ecuador 4–2 to advance to the quarter-finals as well finishing first in their group. Eventually, Brazil lost 2–0 in the penalty shootout against Paraguay and was eliminated in the quarter-finals.

==== Post-Copa América ====
After receiving much criticism from Brazil's failure at the Copa América, Menezes decided to call up the likes of Marcelo, Hulk and Ronaldinho, which appeared to signal a return to the old "Joga Bonito" style.

In preparation for the 2012 Summer Olympics, the new look Brazil team was on an undefeated streak since August 2011 until recently they lost back-to-back games to Mexico 2–0 and Argentina 4–3, both of which were played in the United States. This includes nine wins and impressive victories over Ghana, Argentina and the U.S., while only finishing one game with a draw other than the recent losses to Mexico and Argentina.

On 4 July 2012, due to a lack of competitive matches, as the team automatically qualified for the 2014 World Cup as hosts, Brazil was ranked 11th in the FIFA rankings.

=== Return of Luiz Felipe Scolari (2013–14) ===
Although Brazil won the 2012 Superclásico de las Américas, on 23 November 2012, following poor results in 2012, coach Mano Menezes was sacked. The Brazilian Football Confederation (CBF) would announce a replacement by January 2013, but on 28 November, Luiz Felipe Scolari was appointed as Brazil's new manager.

In the first match being coached by Scolari, on 6 February 2013, Brazil suffered a 2–1 defeat to England at Wembley Stadium.

On 6 June 2013, Brazil was ranked 22nd in the FIFA rankings, their worst ever rank.

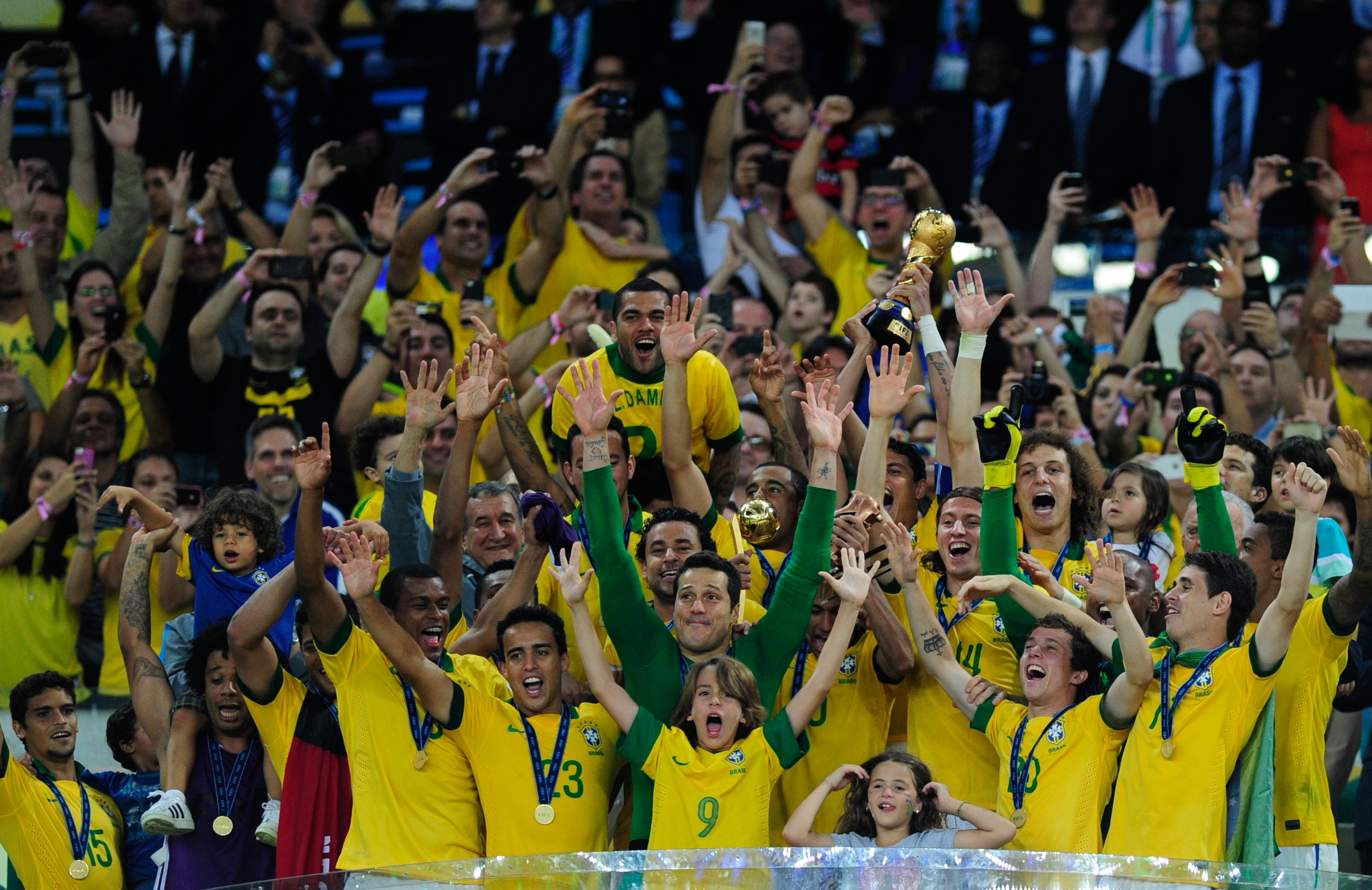
Brazil won the 2013 Confederations Cup with five wins in five matches.

On 9 June 2013, in the last match before the 2013 Confederations Cup, Brazil beat France in the Arena do Grêmio in Porto Alegre 3–0, ending a 21–year winless run against Les Bleus, and it was also the first victory over a former World Cup champion in nearly four years.

==== 2013 FIFA Confederations Cup ====
Brazil entered the tournament with the objective of defending their title, doing so successfully. With a good start in a 3–0 victory against Japan, Brazil beat Mexico (2–0) and Italy (4–2) to qualify for the semi-final. After a somewhat troublesome match against Uruguay, with Paulinho scoring the winning goal in the dying moments, Brazil went to face Spain for the first time in a FIFA tournament in nearly 27 years. Brazil comfortably won the final 3–0, sealing their fourth Confederations Cup title and ending their opponent's run of 29 unbeaten matches in competitive football. Neymar was named player of the tournament and received the Golden Ball Award, while Fred won the Silver Shoe Award with five goals in five matches and Júlio César won the Golden Glove Award for best goalkeeper of the tournament.

==== 2014 World Cup disaster ====
Brazil was drawn into Group A of the 2014 World Cup, alongside Croatia, Mexico and Cameroon. In the opening match of the tournament, Marcelo gave the Croatians an early lead with an own goal. However, two goals from Neymar and one from Oscar turned the game around to get the Seleção off to a winning start in their first World Cup on home soil in 64 years. The team then drew 0–0 with Mexico, as Guillermo Ochoa produced a man of the match performance in the Mexican goal. Brazil confirmed qualification to the knockout stage by defeating Cameroon 4–1 – with Neymar again scoring twice, and Fred and Fernandinho providing further goals.

Brazil faced Chile in the round of 16, taking an 18th-minute lead through David Luiz's first goal for the Seleção. With no further scoring after Alexis Sánchez's equaliser, the match went to a penalty shootout. Brazil prevailed 3–2, with Neymar, David Luiz and Marcelo converting their kicks, and goalkeeper Júlio César saving from Chileans Sánchez and Mauricio Pinilla. The team again faced South American opposition in the quarter-final, defeating Colombia 2–1 with goals from central defenders David Luiz and team captain Thiago Silva. Late in the match, Neymar was substituted on a stretcher after Camilo Zúñiga's knee had made contact with the forward's back. Neymar was taken to hospital and later diagnosed with a fractured vertebra, which ruled him out for the remainder of the tournament. Prior to this, Neymar had scored four goals, provided one assist and been named man of the match twice. Brazil faced further problems ahead of their semi-final against Germany, as Thiago Silva was to serve a one-match suspension for receiving his second yellow card of the tournament in the quarter-final. The Seleção went on to lose 1–7 to the Germans, their biggest ever defeat at the World Cup and first home loss in a competitive match since 1975. Towards the end of the match, the home crowd began to "olé" each pass from the German team, and booed their own players off the pitch after the final whistle. The match has been nicknamed the Mineirazo, making reference to the nation's previous World Cup defeat on home soil, the Maracanazo against Uruguay in 1950, and the Estádio do Mineirão in Belo Horizonte where the match took place.

Brazil finished the World Cup in fourth place, losing to the Netherlands 0–3 in the third-place match. The team ended the tournament with the worst defensive record of the 32 competing nations, having conceded 14 goals. The only other countries to concede 12 or more goals in the current World Cup format are North Korea in 2010 and Saudi Arabia in 2002. Following these results, Scolari announced his resignation.

=== Return of Dunga (2014–2016) ===
On 22 July 2014, Dunga was announced as the new manager of Brazil, returning to the position for the first time since the team's exit at the 2010 World Cup.

Dunga's first match in his second reign as Brazil's manager was a friendly match against 2014 World Cup quarter-finalists Colombia at Sun Life Stadium, Miami, on 5 September 2014, with Brazil winning the match 1–0 through an 83rd-minute Neymar free-kick goal. Dunga followed this up with wins against Ecuador (1–0), in the 2014 Superclásico de las Américas against Argentina (2–0), against Japan (4–0), against Turkey (0–4), and against Austria (1–2). Dunga continued Brazil's winning streak in 2015 by defeating France 3–1 in another friendly. They followed this with wins against Chile (1–0), Mexico (2–0) and Honduras (1–0).

==== 2015 Copa América ====
Brazil started the tournament with a tight victory against Peru after coming from behind by 2–1 (with Douglas Costa scoring in the dying moments), followed by a 1–0 defeat against Colombia and a 2–1 victory against Venezuela. In the knockout stage, Brazil faced Paraguay and was eliminated after drawing 1–1 in normal time and losing 4–3 in the penalty shootout. As such, Brazil was unable to qualify for a Confederations Cup (in this case, the 2017 edition) for the first time in almost 20 years.

==== Copa América Centenario ====
Brazil began the 2016 Copa América Centenario with a scoreless draw against Ecuador, with the Ecuadorians having a goal wrongly disallowed in the second half. This was followed by an emphatic 7–1 victory over Haiti, with Philippe Coutinho scoring a hat-trick. Needing only a draw to progress to the knockout stage of the tournament, Brazil suffered a controversial 1–0 loss to Peru, with Raúl Ruidíaz scoring in the 75th minute by guiding the ball into the net with his arm. This loss, Brazil's first to Peru since 1985, saw Brazil eliminated from the tournament in the group stage for the first time since 1987.

On 14 June 2016, Dunga was sacked as manager of Brazil.

=== Tite (2016–2022) ===
Tite, who had managed the 2015 Brazilian champion Corinthians, was confirmed as Dunga's replacement six days after the latter's dismissal. Tite's debut was marked with a 3–0 away victory against Ecuador on 2 September, followed by a 2–1 win over Colombia, a 5–0 win against Bolivia and a 0–2 victory away against Venezuela, bringing Brazil to the top of the World Cup Qualifiers leaderboard for the first time since 2011. Brazil then defeated Paraguay 3–0 to become the first team, other than the hosts Russia, to qualify for the 2018 World Cup.

Brazil started their 2018 World Cup campaign with a draw against Switzerland – Brazil's goal coming from a 25-yard bending strike from Philippe Coutinho – their first non-win in an opener since 1978. In the following match against Costa Rica on 22 June, goals from Coutinho and Neymar in stoppage time saw Brazil win 2–0. They won their final group game 2–0 over Serbia with goals from Paulinho and Thiago Silva, meaning qualification for the last 16 as group winners. On 2 July, goals from Neymar and Roberto Firmino saw Brazil 2–0 win over Mexico to advance to the quarter-finals. On 6 July, Brazil were eliminated from the 2018 World Cup by Belgium in the quarter-finals, losing 2–1, with Fernandinho scoring an own goal for Belgium while Renato Augusto scored the only goal for Brazil.

In spite of World Cup failure, the CBF continued to trust Tite and allowed him to continue his job as coach of Brazil for the 2019 Copa América held at home. However, Brazilian perpetration for the tournament at home was hampered by the injury of Neymar in a friendly match where Brazil thrashed 2019 AFC Asian Cup champions Qatar 2–0. Despite this loss, Tite managed Brazil to their first Copa América title since 2007. Brazil overcame Bolivia after a goalless first half and Peru in a celebratory 5–0 demolition. Between these matches, Brazil drew Venezuela in a 0–0 draw with three goals ruled out by VAR. Brazil met Paraguay in the quarter-finals where they won a 4–3 penalty shootout after a goalless draw. In the semi-finals Brazil beat neighboring Argentina 2–0 to set up a rematch with Peru. In the final, Brazil managed to defeat the Peruvians once again 3–1 to conquer their ninth Copa América title.

On 8 June 2021, Brazil beat Paraguay 2–0 in a World Cup qualifier in Asunción – the first time they had won in the country since 1985. In the 2022 World Cup, Brazil finished first in their group, having beaten Serbia 2–0, Switzerland 1–0, and losing 1–0 to Cameroon. The team then faced South Korea in the round of 16, winning with a 3-goal margin, and progressed to the quarterfinals where they eventually lost 4–2 on penalties to Croatia. Following their exit from the World Cup, Tite resigned as head coach.

=== Recent years and decline (2023–2026) ===
After Tite left, Ramon Menezes served as manager from March to July 2023, before being replaced by Fernando Diniz until the end of the year. Diniz's tenure ended after Brazil lost to Argentina 1–0 at the Maracanã, with this defeat being their first home loss in FIFA World Cup qualifiers.

The CBF then appointed Dorival Júnior as manager. At the 2024 Copa América held in the United States, Brazil tied 0–0 with Costa Rica, thrashed Paraguay 4-1 and tied 1–1 with Colombia. Brazil was eliminated on penalties by Uruguay in the quarter-finals following a 0–0 draw. Dorival was fired after losing 4–1 to Argentina at the Monumental de Nuñez, and in his place the federation appointed Italian manager Carlo Ancelotti as a replacement.

Brazil qualified for the 2026 FIFA World Cup after a 1–0 victory against Paraguay on 10 June 2025, and reached the round of 16 in which they suffered a 2–1 defeat to Norway.

== Notable players ==
=== IFFHS Player of the Century ===
Below are the results of a poll by International Federation of Football History & Statistics (IFFHS) for the best player of Brazil during the 20th century.

Player of the Century
| Rank | Player | Career | Votes |
|---|---|---|---|
| 1 | Pelé | 1957–1971 | 220 |
| 2 | Garrincha | 1955–1966 | 142 |
| 3 | Zico | 1971–1989 | 51 |
| 4 | Zizinho | 1942–1957 | 40 |
| 5 | Arthur Friedenreich | 1912–1935 | 21 |
| 5 | Tostão | 1966–1972 | 21 |
| 7 | Didi | 1952–1962 | 15 |
| 7 | Leônidas | 1932–1946 | 13 |
| 9 | Nílton Santos | 1949–1962 | 12 |
| 9 | Ronaldo | 1994–2011 | 12 |
| 11 | Romário | 1987–2005 | 11 |
| 12 | Falcão | 1976–1986 | 10 |
| 12 | Rivellino | 1965–1978 | 10 |
| 14 | Ademir da Guia | 1965–1974 | 9 |
| 15 | Luís Pereira | 1973–1977 | 7 |
| 16 | Carlos Alberto Torres | 1964–1977 | 5 |
| 17 | Domingos da Guia | 1931–1946 | 4 |
| 18 | Ademir | 1945–1953 | 3 |
| 19 | Bebeto | 1985–1998 | 2 |
| 19 | Jairzinho | 1963–1982 | 2 |

Goalkeeper of the Century
| Rank | Player | Career | Votes |
|---|---|---|---|
| 1 | Gilmar | 1953–1969 | 47 |
| 2 | Émerson Leão | 1970–1986 | 13 |
| 3 | Barbosa | 1949–1953 | 11 |
| 4 | Manga | 1965–1967 | 4 |

=== Brazilian Football Museum – Hall of Fame ===
The following Brazil players have been inducted into the Pacaembu and Maracanã Brazilian Football Museum Hall of Fame.

- Ademir
- Bebeto
- Chico
- Carlos Alberto Torres
- Didi
- Djalma Santos
- Danilo
- Falcão
- Garrincha
- Gérson
- Gilmar
- Jairzinho
- Julinho
- Kaká
- Neymar
- Nílton Santos
- Pelé
- Rivaldo
- Rivellino
- Roberto Carlos
- Romário
- Ronaldinho
- Ronaldo
- Sócrates
- Cláudio Taffarel
- Tostão
- Vavá
- Mário Zagallo
- Zico
- Zizinho

== Kit evolution ==
The first Brazil team colours were white with blue collars, but following defeat in the Maracanã at the 1950 World Cup, the colours were criticised for lacking patriotism. With permission from the Brazilian Sports Confederation, the newspaper Correio da Manhã held a competition to design a kit incorporating the four colours of Brazil's flag. The winning design was a yellow jersey with green trim and blue shorts with white trim drawn by Aldyr Garcia Schlee, a nineteen-year-old from Pelotas. The new colours were first used on 14 March 1954 in a match against Chile, and have been used ever since. The last game with the white shirt was held on 13 March 1957 (vs. Chile), and would only be used again in two other opportunities since then (2004 and 2019).

The use of blue as the kit colour dates from the 1938 (against Poland) and 1939 (in 1939-40 Copa Roca), but it became the permanent second choice accidentally in the 1958 World Cup final. Brazil's opponents was Sweden, who also wear yellow, and a draw gave the home team, Sweden, the right to play in yellow. Brazil, who travelled with no spare kit, hurriedly purchased a set of blue shirts and sewed on emblems cut from their yellow shirts.

Brazil's kit supplier since 1997 has been Nike and will continue to do so until 2038.

=== Home kit ===
| 1914–1916 | 1916 (1916 South American Championship) | 1917 (1917 South American Championship) | 1918 (27 January 1918, v. Dublin FC) | 1919–1940 | 1939 (22 January 1939, 1939–40 Copa Roca) | 1942–1957 | 1954–present |

=== Away kit ===
| 1958–1990 | 1990–present |

=== Special cases ===
| 1919 ^{1} | 1937 ^{2} | 1937 ^{3} | 1938^{4} | 2004^{5} | 2019^{6} | 2023^{7} | 2026^{8} |

- ^{1} Peñarol shirt, worn in the Copa Roberto Chery
- ^{2} Independiente shirt, worn in 1937 South American Championship match against Peru
- ^{3} Boca Juniors shirt, worn in 1937 South American Championship match against Chile
- ^{4} Training uniform shirts, worn in 1938 FIFA World Cup match against Poland.
- ^{5} Worn in the first half of the friendly match against France (20 May 2004), in celebration of the 100 years of FIFA.
- ^{6} Worn in 2019 Copa América opening match against Bolivia, in honor of 100 years of 1919 South American Championship title.
- ^{7} 2022–23 goalkeeper kit, worn in the first half of the friendly match against Guinea in support of Vinícius Júnior and the fight against racism.
- ^{8} 2026 FIFA World Cup away kits, the first one produced by the Jordan brand for national teams, which sparked controversy for originally being red.

== Previous squads ==
=== World Cup ===
- 1930 FIFA World Cup
- 1934 FIFA World Cup
- 1938 FIFA World Cup
- 1950 FIFA World Cup
- 1954 FIFA World Cup
- 1958 FIFA World Cup
- 1962 FIFA World Cup
- 1966 FIFA World Cup
- 1970 FIFA World Cup
- 1974 FIFA World Cup
- 1978 FIFA World Cup
- 1982 FIFA World Cup
- 1986 FIFA World Cup
- 1990 FIFA World Cup
- 1994 FIFA World Cup
- 1998 FIFA World Cup
- 2002 FIFA World Cup
- 2006 FIFA World Cup
- 2010 FIFA World Cup
- 2014 FIFA World Cup
- 2018 FIFA World Cup
- 2022 FIFA World Cup
- 2026 FIFA World Cup

=== Confederations Cup ===
- 1997 FIFA Confederations Cup
- 1999 FIFA Confederations Cup
- 2001 FIFA Confederations Cup
- 2003 FIFA Confederations Cup
- 2005 FIFA Confederations Cup
- 2009 FIFA Confederations Cup
- 2013 FIFA Confederations Cup

=== Copa América ===
- 1916 South American Championship
- 1917 South American Championship
- 1919 South American Championship
- 1920 South American Championship
- 1921 South American Championship
- 1922 South American Championship
- 1923 South American Championship
- 1925 South American Championship
- 1937 South American Championship
- 1942 South American Championship
- 1945 South American Championship
- 1946 South American Championship
- 1949 South American Championship
- 1953 South American Championship
- 1956 South American Championship
- 1957 South American Championship
- 1959 South American Championship (Argentina)
- 1959 South American Championship (Ecuador)
- 1963 South American Championship
- 1975 Copa América
- 1979 Copa América
- 1983 Copa América
- 1987 Copa América
- 1989 Copa América
- 1991 Copa América
- 1993 Copa América
- 1995 Copa América
- 1997 Copa América
- 1999 Copa América
- 2001 Copa América
- 2004 Copa América
- 2007 Copa América
- 2011 Copa América
- 2015 Copa América
- Copa América Centenario
- 2019 Copa América
- 2021 Copa América
- 2024 Copa América

=== Gold Cup ===
- 1996 CONCACAF Gold Cup
- 1998 CONCACAF Gold Cup
- 2003 CONCACAF Gold Cup

=== Olympic Games ===
- 1952 Summer Olympics
- 1960 Summer Olympics
- 1964 Summer Olympics
- 1968 Summer Olympics
- 1972 Summer Olympics
- 1976 Summer Olympics
- 1984 Summer Olympics
- 1988 Summer Olympics
- 1996 Summer Olympics
- 2000 Summer Olympics
- 2008 Summer Olympics
- 2012 Summer Olympics
- 2016 Summer Olympics
- 2020 Summer Olympics
