= Ricaurte, Magûí Payán =

Ricaurte
- Populated center
- Location in Nariño and Colombia Ricaurte (Colombia)
- Coordinates: 1°54′37.548″N 78°5′0.0132″W
- Country: Colombia
- Department: Nariño
- Municipality: Magüí Payán Municipality
- Elevation: 330 ft (100 m)

Population (2005)
  - Total: 299
- Time zone: UTC-5 (Colombia Standard Time)

Ricaurte is a populated center of Colombia in Magüí Payán Municipality, Nariño Department in Colombia.

== Climate ==
Ricaurte has a very wet tropical rainforest climate (Af).

Climate data for Ricaurte
Month	Jan	Feb	Mar	Apr	May	Jun	Jul	Aug	Sep	Oct	Nov	Dec	Year
Mean daily maximum °C (°F)	29.5 (85.1)	30.0 (86.0)	30.3 (86.5)	30.2 (86.4)	29.8 (85.6)	29.7 (85.5)	29.7 (85.5)	29.4 (84.9)	29.4 (84.9)	29.2 (84.6)	29.2 (84.6)	29.4 (84.9)	29.6 (85.4)
Daily mean °C (°F)	25.8 (78.4)	26.0 (78.8)	26.3 (79.3)	26.2 (79.2)	26.0 (78.8)	25.8 (78.4)	25.8 (78.4)	25.7 (78.3)	25.7 (78.3)	25.7 (78.3)	25.6 (78.1)	25.7 (78.3)	25.9 (78.5)
Mean daily minimum °C (°F)	22.1 (71.8)	22.1 (71.8)	22.4 (72.3)	22.3 (72.1)	22.3 (72.1)	22.0 (71.6)	22.0 (71.6)	22.1 (71.8)	22.1 (71.8)	22.2 (72.0)	22.1 (71.8)	22.1 (71.8)	22.1 (71.9)
Average rainfall mm (inches)	490.4 (19.31)	480.9 (18.93)	550.1 (21.66)	739.0 (29.09)	802.5 (31.59)	571.7 (22.51)	479.5 (18.88)	385.0 (15.16)	421.7 (16.60)	509.4 (20.06)	401.3 (15.80)	403.0 (15.87)	6,234.5 (245.46)
Average rainy days	22	20	19	23	26	24	22	20	21	22	20	22	261
