= Brazil at the 1986 FIFA World Cup =

Matches of the Brazil national football team in the 1986 FIFA World Cup

The Brazil national football team participated in the 1986 FIFA World Cup, and in doing so maintained their record of being the only team to enter every World Cup Finals. The team was managed for the second consecutive time by Telê Santana and the captain was Edinho.

Brazil played until the quarter-finals, when they were defeated by France on penalties.

== Qualifying ==
1986 FIFA World Cup qualification (CONMEBOL Group 3)

June 2, 1985, Santa Cruz, Bolivia - Bolivia 0 - 2 Brazil

June 16, 1985, Asunción, Paraguay - Paraguay 0 - 2 Brazil

June 23, 1985, Rio de Janeiro, Brazil - Brazil 1 - 1 Paraguay

June 30, 1985, São Paulo, Brazil - Brazil 1 - 1 Bolivia

| Team | Pld | W | D | L | GF | GA | GD | Pts |
|---|---|---|---|---|---|---|---|---|
| Brazil | 4 | 2 | 2 | 0 | 6 | 2 | +4 | 6 |
| Paraguay | 4 | 1 | 2 | 1 | 5 | 4 | +1 | 4 |
| Bolivia | 4 | 0 | 2 | 2 | 2 | 7 | −5 | 2 |

Brazil qualified.

== The Cup ==
=== Group stage ===
Group D

| Team | Pld | W | D | L | GF | GA | GD | Pts |
|---|---|---|---|---|---|---|---|---|
| Brazil | 3 | 3 | 0 | 0 | 5 | 0 | +5 | 6 |
| Spain | 3 | 2 | 0 | 1 | 5 | 2 | +3 | 4 |
| Northern Ireland | 3 | 0 | 1 | 2 | 2 | 6 | −4 | 1 |
| Algeria | 3 | 0 | 1 | 2 | 1 | 5 | −4 | 1 |

1 June 1986
12:00 CST

| Spain | 0 – 1 | Brazil |
|---|---|---|
| | Report | Sócrates 62' |

Estadio Jalisco, Guadalajara
Attendance: 35,748
Referee: Chris Bambridge (Australia)

6 June 1986
12:00 CST

| Brazil | 1 – 0 | Algeria |
|---|---|---|
| Careca 66' | Report |

Estadio Jalisco, Guadalajara
Attendance: 48,000
Referee: Rómulo Méndez (Guatemala)

12 June 1986
12:00 CST

| Northern Ireland | 0 – 3 | Brazil |
|---|---|---|
| | Report | Careca 15', 87'; Josimar 42' |

Estadio Jalisco, Guadalajara
Attendance: 51,000
Referee: Siegfried Kirschen (East Germany)

=== Knockout stage ===
Last 16

16 June 1986
12:00 CST

| Brazil | 4 – 0 | Poland |
|---|---|---|
| Sócrates 30' (pen.); Josimar 55'; Edinho 79'; Careca 83' (pen.) | Report |

Estadio Jalisco, Guadalajara
Attendance: 45,000
Referee: Volker Roth (West Germany)

Quarter-final

21 June 1986
12:00 CST

| Brazil | 1 – 1 (a.e.t.) | France |
|---|---|---|
| Careca 17' | Report | Platini 40' |
Penalties
| Sócrates (penalty missed); Alemão (penalty scored); Zico (penalty scored); Branco (penalty scored); Júlio César (penalty missed) | 3 – 4 | (penalty scored) Stopyra; (penalty scored) Amoros; (penalty scored) Bellone; (penalty missed) Platini; (penalty scored) Fernández |

Estadio Jalisco, Guadalajara
Attendance: 65,000
Referee: Ioan Igna (Romania)

== Roster ==
Head coach: (Brazil) Telê Santana

| No. | Pos. | Player | Date of birth (age) | Caps | Club |
|---|---|---|---|---|---|
| 1 | GK | Carlos | 4 March 1956 (aged 30) | 16 | (Brazil) Corinthians |
| 2 | DF | Édson | 3 July 1959 (aged 26) | 17 | (Brazil) Corinthians |
| 3 | DF | Oscar | 20 June 1954 (aged 31) | 59 | (Brazil) São Paulo |
| 4 | DF | Edinho (Captain) | 5 June 1955 (aged 30) | 40 | (Italy) Udinese |
| 5 | MF | Falcão | 16 October 1953 (aged 32) | 26 | (Brazil) São Paulo |
| 6 | MF | Júnior | 29 June 1954 (aged 31) | 56 | (Italy) Torino |
| 7 | FW | Müller | 31 January 1966 (aged 20) | 7 | (Brazil) São Paulo |
| 8 | FW | Casagrande | 15 April 1963 (aged 23) | 16 | (Brazil) Corinthians |
| 9 | FW | Careca | 5 October 1960 (aged 25) | 28 | (Brazil) São Paulo |
| 10 | MF | Zico | 3 March 1953 (aged 33) | 68 | (Brazil) Flamengo |
| 11 | FW | Edivaldo | 13 April 1962 (aged 24) | 2 | (Brazil) Atlético Mineiro |
| 12 | GK | Paulo Vítor | 7 June 1957 (aged 28) | 8 | (Brazil) Fluminense |
| 13 | DF | Josimar | 19 September 1961 (aged 24) | 0 | (Brazil) Botafogo |
| 14 | DF | Júlio César | 8 March 1963 (aged 23) | 1 | (Brazil) Guarani |
| 15 | MF | Alemão | 22 November 1961 (aged 24) | 14 | (Brazil) Botafogo |
| 16 | DF | Mauro Galvão | 19 December 1961 (aged 24) | 1 | (Brazil) Internacional |
| 17 | DF | Branco | 4 April 1964 (aged 22) | 9 | (Brazil) Fluminense |
| 18 | MF | Sócrates | 19 February 1954 (aged 32) | 55 | (Brazil) Flamengo |
| 19 | MF | Elzo | 22 January 1961 (aged 25) | 6 | (Brazil) Atlético Mineiro |
| 20 | MF | Silas | 27 August 1965 (aged 20) | 3 | (Brazil) São Paulo |
| 21 | MF | Valdo | 12 January 1964 (aged 22) | 0 | (Brazil) Grêmio |
| 22 | GK | Leão | 11 July 1949 (aged 36) | 80 | (Brazil) Palmeiras |

== Starting 11 ==
| No. | Pos. | Nat. | Name | MS | Notes |
|---|---|---|---|---|---|
| 1 | GK | (Brazil) | Carlos | 5 | |
| 13 | RB | (Brazil) | Josimar | 3 | Édson had two starts |
| 3 | CB | (Brazil) | Edinho | 5 | |
| 14 | CB | (Brazil) | J. César | 5 | |
| 17 | LB | (Brazil) | Branco | 5 | |
| 18 | RM | (Brazil) | Sócrates | 5 | |
| 19 | CM | (Brazil) | Elzo | 5 | |
| 15 | CM | (Brazil) | Alemão | 5 | |
| 6 | LM | (Brazil) | Júnior | 5 | |
| 7 | CF | (Brazil) | Müller | 3 | Casagrande had two starts |
| 9 | CF | (Brazil) | Careca | 5 | |

== Scorers ==
5 goals

- (Brazil) Careca

2 goals

- (Brazil) Josimar
- (Brazil) Sócrates

1 goal

- (Brazil) Edinho
