= Josimar (magazine) =

Norwegian football magazine

- The cover of Josimar's first issue of 2025
- Type: Magazine
- Editor: Håvard Melnæs
- Founded: 2009; 16 years ago
- Language: Norwegian, English
- Country: Norway
- Circulation: 10,000 (as of 2018)
- Website: josimar.no (Norwegian) josimarfootball.com (English)

Josimar is a Norwegian monthly magazine which publishes investigative journalism centering on football. Most of the articles are written by writers with backgrounds other than sports journalism. The magazine's current editor is Håvard Melnæs. In 2018, the circulation was reported to be around 10,000 copies per month. In 2022, the magazine received funding from Fritt Ord, an organisation dedicated to supporting free press, in relation to their reporting on the Qatar World Cup.

== History ==
Josimar was founded in April 2009, taking its name from Josimar Higino Pereira, a Brazilian right back who became famous as a result of his performance in the 1986 World Cup.

In 2010, Josimar was awarded Magazine of the Year by the Association of Norwegian Editors.

The magazine is a member of the Norwegian Press Association (NPA). In November 2020, Josimar reported on information it had been supplied by an anonymous source regarding the Norwegian Football Federation's handling of a possible sponsorship project. The NFF, represented by their secretary general Pål Bjerketvedt, subsequently made a complaint to the NPA's complaints commission. In the complaint, the NFF stated they believed the magazine had not adequately fact-checked their information before publicising it. The complaint led to the magazine being censured by the NPA for failing to allow the NFF the right of reply.

In 2023, Josimar was acquired by Venture Factory Media, which also owns Filter Nyheter. By June 2025, Venture Factory Media's owner Even Aas-Eng announced that he had attempted to sell both Josimar and Filter Nyheter due to their continued inability to turn a profit, but had been unsuccessful in securing a buyer for either. Both magazines successfully saved themselves from potentially being shut down, with a membership drive securing 1,000 individual paying subscribers as financial support.

In 2025, the magazine's editor Håvard Melnæs retired after 16 years, with fellow Josimar journalist Lars Johnsen taking over the role.
