= Brazil at the 1974 FIFA World Cup =

Matches of the Brazil national football team in the 1974 FIFA World Cup

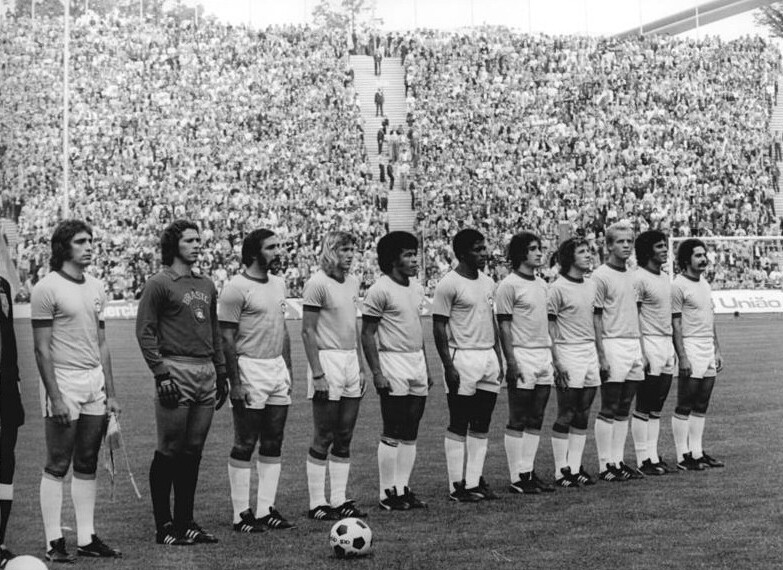
Brazil at the 1974 FIFA World Cup

The Brazil national football team participated in the 1974 FIFA World Cup, and in doing so maintained their record of being the only team to enter every World Cup Finals.

Brazil finished in fourth place, failing to top their group in the second group phase.

== Qualifying ==
Brazil qualified as the defending champions, having won the 1970 FIFA World Cup.

== The Cup ==
=== First round ===
Group 2

Team	Pld	W	D	L	GF	GA	GD	Pts
Yugoslavia	3	1	2	0	10	1	+9	4
Brazil	3	1	2	0	3	0	+3	4
Scotland	3	1	2	0	3	1	+2	4
Zaire	3	0	0	3	0	14	−14	0

13 June 1974
17:00 CET

Brazil	0 – 0	Yugoslavia
	Report

Waldstadion, Frankfurt
Attendance: 62,000
Referee: Rudolf Scheurer (Switzerland)

18 June 1974
19:30 CET

Scotland	0 – 0	Brazil
	Report

Waldstadion, Frankfurt
Attendance: 50,000
Referee: Arie van Gemert (Netherlands)

22 June 1974
16:00 CET

Zaire	0 – 3	Brazil
	Report	Jairzinho 12'; Rivellino 66'; Valdomiro 79'

Parkstadion, Gelsenkirchen
Attendance: 35,000
Referee: Nicolae Rainea (Romania)

=== Second round ===
Group A

Team	Pld	W	D	L	GF	GA	GD	Pts
Netherlands	3	3	0	0	8	0	+8	6
Brazil	3	2	0	1	3	3	0	4
East Germany	3	0	1	2	1	4	−3	1
Argentina	3	0	1	2	2	7	−5	1

Netherlands qualified for the final match, and Brazil qualified for the match for third place.

26 June 1974
19:30 CET

Brazil	1 – 0	East Germany
Rivellino 60'	Report

Niedersachsenstadion, Hanover
Attendance: 58,463
Referee: Clive Thomas (Wales)

30 June 1974
16:00 CET

Argentina	1 – 2	Brazil
Brindisi 35'	Report	Rivellino 32'; Jairzinho 49'

Niedersachsenstadion, Hanover
Attendance: 38,000
Referee: Vital Loraux (Belgium)

3 July 1974
19:30 CET

Netherlands	2 – 0	Brazil
Neeskens 50'; Cruyff 65'	Report

Westfalenstadion, Dortmund
Attendance: 52,500
Referee: Kurt Tschenscher (West Germany)

=== Match for third place ===
6 July 1974
16:00 CET

Brazil	0 – 1	Poland
	Report	Lato 76'

Olympiastadion, Munich
Attendance: 74,100
Referee: Aurelio Angonese (Italy)

== Starting 11 ==
No.	Pos.	Nat.	Name	MS	Notes
1	GK	(Brazil)	Leão	7	
4	RB	(Brazil)	Zé Maria	4	Nelinho had three starts
3	CB	(Brazil)	M. Peres	7	
2	CB	(Brazil)	L. Pereira	6	Alfredo had one start
6	LB	(Brazil)	Chagas	7	
11	DM	(Brazil)	Caju	5	Piazza had three starts
17	DM	(Brazil)	Carpegiani	5	
21	AM	(Brazil)	Dirceu	4	Ademir (1), Mirandinha (1), Edú (1)
7	RW	(Brazil)	Jairzinho	7	
10	LW	(Brazil)	Rivellino	7	
13	CF	(Brazil)	Valdomiro	5	Leivinha had three starts

== Goalscorers ==
3 goals

- (Brazil) Rivellino

2 goals

- (Brazil) Jairzinho

1 goal

- (Brazil) Valdomiro
