= Itabirito =

Itabirito Enchant Town
- Municipality
- Flag Coat of arms
- Nickname: Enchant Town
- Location in Minas Gerais

- Location in Brazil
- Coordinates: 20.253°S 43.801°W
- Country: Brazil
- Region: Southeast
- State: Minas Gerais

Population (2022 Census)
  - Total: 53,365
  - Estimate (2025): 56,369
- Time zone: UTC−3 (BRT)
- Area code: 31

Itabirito is a municipality in the Minas Gerais state of Brazil. Its population is estimated to have 56,369 people in 2025. The city belongs to the mesoregion Metropolitan of Belo Horizonte and to the microregion of Ouro Preto.

The municipality contains 10% of the 31,270 hectares (77,300 acres) Serra do Gandarela National Park, created in 2014.

During the 19th century, there was a high influx of immigration to Itabirito, caused both by gold mining and the construction of the railroad.

== Notable people ==
Telê Santana (1931–2006), soccer coach of the Brazilian professional team during the 1982 World Cup and 1986 World Cup editions. He is regarded as one of the greatest innovators in the history of Brazilian soccer.

== Itabirito on the Map ==
Satellite image of Itabirito (Google Earth) http://maps.google.ca/maps?f=q&hl=en&geocode=&q=Itabirito&sll=-19.147763,-41.726074&sspn=1.849915,2.570801&ie=UTF8&t=h&z=11&om=1

== Mayors of Itabirito ==
[data missing]

José Theodoro Alves Júnior (1923–1930)

Alberto Woods Soares (1930–1936)

Antônio Marques Costa (1936–1942)

José Raimundo Soares Silva (1943–1946)

José Raimundo Soares Silva (1948–1950)

Flávio Alves Ferreira Bastos (1951–1954)

Gastão Melillo (1953–1966)

José Galo (1955–1958)

Antônio Gomes Batista (1959–1962)

Celso Matos Silva (1967)

Celso Matos Silva (1970)

José Bastos Bittencourt (1973–1976)

Waldir Salvador de Oliveira (1971)

Gastão Melillo (1972)

Celso Matos Silva (1977–1982)

Celso Matos Silva (1982)

Gastão Melillo (1983–1988)

Waldir Silva Salvador de Oliveira Júnior (1989–1992)

Geraldo Mendanha de Almeida (1993–1996)

Manoel da Mota Neto (1997–2000)

Manoel da Mota Neto (2001–2004)

Waldir Silva Salvador de Oliveira Júnior (2005–2008)

Alex Salvador de Oliveira (2009)

Manoel da Mota Neto (2010–2012)

Alex Salvador de Oliveira (2013–2016)

Alex Salvador de Oliveira (2017–2019)

Orlando Amorim Caldeira (2019–2020)

== See also ==
- List of municipalities in Minas Gerais
