= Magüí Payán =

Coordinates: 1°56′N 78°12′W

- Municipality and town
- Flag

- Location of the municipality and town of Magüí Payán in the Nariño Department of Colombia.
- Country: Colombia
- Department: Nariño Department

Population (Census 2018)
  - Total: 18,262
- Time zone: UTC-5 (Colombia Standard Time)

Magüí Payán (Spanish pronunciation: [maˈɣwi]) is a town and municipality in the Nariño Department, Colombia.

== Climate ==
Magüí Payán has a tropical rainforest climate (Köppen Af) with very heavy rainfall year round.

Climate data for Magüí Payán
Month	Jan	Feb	Mar	Apr	May	Jun	Jul	Aug	Sep	Oct	Nov	Dec	Year
Mean daily maximum °C (°F)	29.5 (85.1)	30.0 (86.0)	30.3 (86.5)	30.2 (86.4)	29.8 (85.6)	29.7 (85.5)	29.7 (85.5)	29.4 (84.9)	29.4 (84.9)	29.2 (84.6)	29.2 (84.6)	29.4 (84.9)	29.6 (85.4)
Daily mean °C (°F)	25.8 (78.4)	26.0 (78.8)	26.3 (79.3)	26.2 (79.2)	26.0 (78.8)	25.8 (78.4)	25.8 (78.4)	25.7 (78.3)	25.7 (78.3)	25.7 (78.3)	25.6 (78.1)	25.7 (78.3)	25.9 (78.5)
Mean daily minimum °C (°F)	22.1 (71.8)	22.1 (71.8)	22.4 (72.3)	22.3 (72.1)	22.3 (72.1)	22.0 (71.6)	22.0 (71.6)	22.1 (71.8)	22.1 (71.8)	22.2 (72.0)	22.1 (71.8)	22.1 (71.8)	22.1 (71.9)
Average rainfall mm (inches)	365.1 (14.37)	349.7 (13.77)	454.6 (17.90)	537.0 (21.14)	537.1 (21.15)	433.2 (17.06)	332.5 (13.09)	334.5 (13.17)	372.2 (14.65)	315.6 (12.43)	294.7 (11.60)	340.7 (13.41)	4,666.9 (183.74)
Average rainy days	26	22	23	27	28	26	23	22	24	24	22	24	291
Source 1: Instituto de Hidrología, Meteorología y Estudios Ambientales
Source 2:

== Notable people ==
- Julián Quiñones (born 1997), Mexican footballer
- Josimar Quiñonez (born 1987), Colombian footballer
