= Josimar Quiñonez =

Colombian footballer (born 1987)

Personal information
- Full name: Josimar Quiñonez Sánchez
- Date of birth: 26 March 1987 (age 39)
- Place of birth: Magüí Payán, Colombia
- Height: 1.89 m (6 ft 2 in)
- Position: Defender

Senior career*
Years	Team	Apps	(Gls)
2005–2007	América de Cali	10	(0)
2008	Córdoba FC	3	(0)
2009	Depor Aguablanca	11	(0)
2010	Cerro Largo	8	(0)
2010–2012	Palestino	8	(0)
2012	→ Deportes Puerto Montt (loan)	21	(0)
- * Club domestic league appearances and goals

Josimar Quiñonez Sánchez (born 26 March 1987) is a Colombian former professional footballer who played as a defender.

== Teams ==
- (Colombia) América de Cali 2005–2007
- (Colombia) Córdoba FC 2008
- (Colombia) Depor Aguablanca 2009
- (Uruguay) Cerro Largo 2010
- (Chile) Palestino 2010–2011
- (Chile) Deportes Puerto Montt 2012
