= Josimar (footballer, born 1972) =

Brazilian footballer

Personal information
- Full name: Josimar de Carvalho Ferreira
- Date of birth: April 9, 1972 (age 54)
- Place of birth: Rio de Janeiro, Brazil
- Height: 1.86 m (6 ft 1 in)
- Position: Forward

Senior career*
Years	Team	Apps	(Gls)
1991–93	São Cristóvão		
1994	Fluminense		
1994	Bangu		
1995	América (RJ)		
1996–2003	Portuguesa (RJ)		
2000	→Pohang (loan)	4	(0)
2003	Coritiba		
2004	Democrata		
2004	CFZ do Rio		
2005–06	Nova Iguaçu		
2007	Madureira		
2008	Alegrense		
2009	Coritiba		
- * Club domestic league appearances and goals as of 28 September 2007

Josimar de Carvalho Ferreira, also known as Josimar (born April 9, 1972, in Rio de Janeiro) is a retired Brazilian footballer.

== Honours ==
- Campeonato Carioca in 1991, 1992 with São Cristóvão
- Campeonato Carioca in 1996, 2003 with Portuguesa
- Campeonato Carioca in 2005 with Nova Iguaçu
