= Josimar (footballer, born 1961) =

Brazilian footballer and coach

Personal information
- Full name: Josimar Higino Pereira
- Date of birth: 19 September 1961 (age 65)
- Place of birth: Rio de Janeiro, Brazil
- Position: Right back

Senior career*
Years	Team	Apps	(Gls)
1982–1989	Botafogo	94	(3)
1988	Sevilla	13	(0)
1989–1990	Flamengo	18	(0)
1991	Internacional	34	(17)
1991	Novo Hamburgo		
1991	Bangu		
1992	Uberlândia		
1992	Ceará		
1992–1994	Jorge Wilstermann		
1994–1996	Fast		
1997	Mineros de Guayana		

International career
1986–1989	Brazil	16	(2)
- * Club domestic league appearances and goals

Josimar Higino Pereira (born 19 September 1961), more commonly known as Josimar, is a Brazilian former footballer. Throughout his career, he played as a right-back, mainly with Botafogo de Futebol e Regatas and the Brazil national team. In his prime, he was named the best right-back in the world by FIFA. He is currently assistant coach at Botafogo.

== Club career ==
Josimar was born in Rio de Janeiro on 19 September 1961.

Throughout his club career, he played for Brazilian side Botafogo (1982–89), with whom he won the Campeonato Carioca in 1989, followed by a disappointing spell for Spanish side Sevilla (1988). He later returned to Brazil where he played for Flamengo (1989–90), Internacional, Novo Hamburgo and Bangu (all in 1991), Uberlândia and Ceará (both in 1992). He then played for Jorge Wilstermann in Bolivia (1992–94), Fast in Brazil (1994–96), and Mineros de Guayana in Venezuela (1997).

During the 80s, he was also linked with Scottish side Dundee United and English side Manchester United.

== International career ==
Josimar won 16 caps with the Brazil national team, from June 1986 to November 1989. He was uncapped and unemployed at the time of his international debut in the 1986 Football World Cup in Mexico, as his contract with Botafogo had expired in March. He was called up as a last-minute replacement, following an incident in which Leandro and Renato Gaúcho had broken manager Telê Santana's rules by sneaking out to a nightclub and drinking; only Renato was excluded from the team as a result, but Leandro turned down his spot in an act of solidarity. Josimar later took on a starting role after an injury to first choice right-back Édson in the second group match; he made three appearances throughout the tournament. His only two goals for Brazil were memorable, and were both scored in his first two international matches during the tournament, in the final group D match – a 3–0 win against Northern Ireland –, and in the round of 16, a 4–0 win against Poland; the first goal was a long distance strike, while the second involved an individual run with a powerful finish from a tight angle inside the box. Brazil reached the quarter-finals, where they were eliminated by France on penalties following a 1–1 draw; Josimar was later named to the 1986 World Cup All-star team for his performances. He also took part at the 1987 and 1989 editions of the Copa América, winning the latter tournament.

== Personal life ==
Following his rise to fame after the 1986 World Cup, Josimar struggled with alcohol and drug abuse, as well as financial problems; moreover, he was a notorious womaniser. He was imprisoned in 1986 for striking a prostitute who had racially abused him when he allegedly attempted to negotiate a cheaper price for her services. A few years later, he threw his wallet out of the window when being chased by police; it was later found with three grams of cocaine in it. His brother, a cocaine addict, was also shot dead in a favela. He also lost contact with his children. He later found more stability in his personal life after he embraced Christianity.

In a 1995 interview, he commented on his turbulent personal life stating: "Maradona and Edmundo were given second chances. Why not me? Nobody ever proved anything against me. I only liked a bit of whisky." In a 2010 interview with FourFourTwo magazine, Josimar stated that his former teammate Jorginho helped him during the lowest point of his life, and arranged for him to take up a role at his football school for children on the outskirts of Rio de Janeiro, which contributed to him turning his life around.

Josimar's son, Josimar Jr., played for Botafogo youth teams as a right-back. In the end of 2006, he moved to Cruzeiro and then later to Vasco in mid February 2008 by signing a 3-year deal until the end of 2010.

== Honours ==
=== Club ===
Botafogo

- Campeonato Carioca (Rio de Janeiro championship): 1989

Ceará Sporting Club

- Campeonato Cearense (Ceará State championship): 1992

=== International ===
Brazil

- Copa América: 1989
- Rous Cup: 1987

=== Individual ===
- FIFA World Cup All-Star Team: 1986
- South American Team of the Year: 1986, 1987
