= Jairzinho =

Brazilian footballer (born 1944)

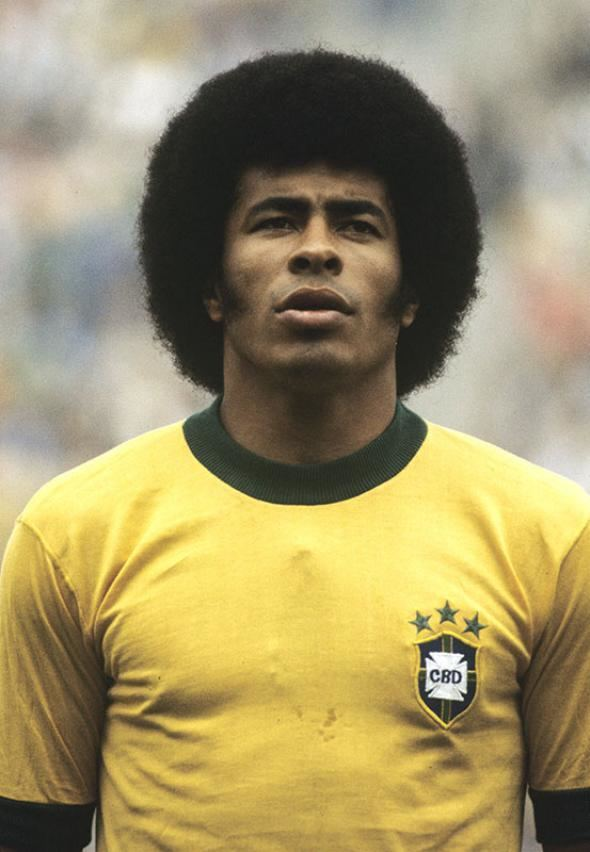
- Jairzinho with Brazil in 1974

Personal information
- Full name: Jair Ventura Filho
- Date of birth: 25 December 1944 (age 81)
- Place of birth: Duque de Caxias, Rio de Janeiro, Brazil
- Height: 1.73 m (5 ft 8 in)
- Positions: Winger; forward

Youth career
- 1958–1962: Botafogo

Senior career*
Years	Team	Apps	(Gls)
1962–1974	Botafogo	416	(186)
1974–1975	Marseille	18	(9)
1975	Kaizer Chiefs	3	(1)
1976	Cruzeiro	32	(18)
1977	Portuguesa (VEN)	21	(21)
1978–1979	Noroeste	10	(4)
1979	Fast Clube	2	(0)
1980–1981	Jorge Wilstermann	26	(17)
1981–1982	Botafogo	2	(0)
1982–1983	9 de Octubre	10	(3)
Total		540	(259)

International career
1963	Brazil Olympic	4	(2)
1964–1982	Brazil	81	(33)

Managerial career
- 1987–1988: Londrina
- 1988–1989: Al-Wehda
- 1989–1991: São Cristóvão
- 1995–1996: Bonsucesso
- 1997–1998: Kalamata
- 2001–2002: Mesquita
- 2003–2005: Gabon
Medal record
Men's Football
Representing Brazil
FIFA World Cup
Winner	1970 Mexico
Pan American Games
Winner	1963 São Paulo
- * Club domestic league appearances and goals

Jair Ventura Filho (born 25 December 1944), better known as Jairzinho (Portuguese pronunciation: [ʒaˌiʁˈzĩɲu]), is a Brazilian former professional footballer. A quick, skillful, and powerful right winger known for his finishing ability and eye for goal, he was a key member and leading scorer of the Brazil national team that won the 1970 FIFA World Cup.

Jairzinho was nicknamed "the Hurricane" (Portuguese: o Furacão) in reference to the way his jersey would shake as he ran down the wing during his playing days. A versatile forward, he was also capable of playing in a variety of other attacking positions, as a main striker, second striker, or even as an attacking midfielder. He was known for his large afro towards the later stages of his career, as well as his burst of pace, dribbling, ball skills, finishing ability, shot power and physical strength due to his large muscular build. He is widely considered one of the greatest Brazilian players of all time and one of the greatest wingers of all time.

Due to the economic and political situation of the time, as well as the Sport Legislation, Jairzinho played most of his club football in South America where he spent eleven years at Rio de Janeiro club Botafogo. He went on to play in Europe for Marseille during the final years of his career, a common pattern for South American players until the 1980s, when the economic and political situation changed. Jairzinho replaced his footballing idol Garrincha in both the Botafogo and Brazil teams, and played in three consecutive World Cups: 1966, 1970 and 1974.

== Early years ==
Jair Ventura Filho was born on 25 December 1944 in Rio de Janeiro, Jairzinho's family left Duque de Caxias for Rio in the late 50s. Living on Rua General Severiano where he went through the youth setup at local club Botafogo.

== Club career ==
=== Botafogo ===
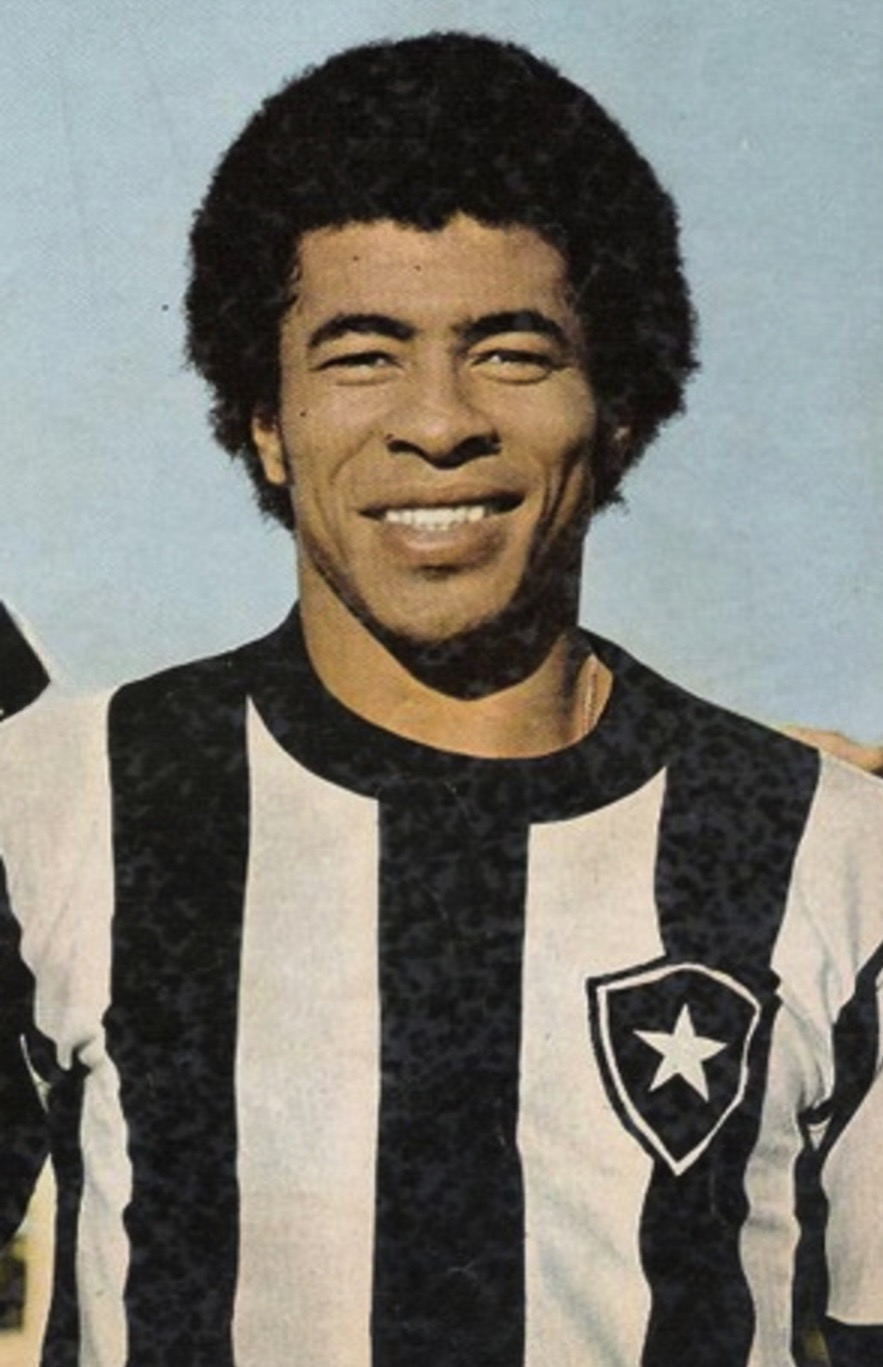
Jairzinho with Botafogo in 1973

Jairzinho started his football career in 1958 aged 13 assigned to the Botafogo youth teams and working as a ball boy for the first team. He made his professional debut with the club as a striker at the age of fifteen in 1960. His idol Garrincha, whom he would eventually replace for both club and country, also played at Botafogo, albeit in Jairzinho's preferred position on the right wing. This resulted in Jairzinho spending most of his early games playing on the left wing or as a centre forward. However, he would fill in as a right winger, by far his strongest position, when Garrincha was injured.

Jairzinho finally established himself as a Botafogo regular in 1965 aged 21 and was seen as a rising star to the entire nation. During this young age he was already playing with Brazil and Botafogo superstars such as Gérson, Mario Zagallo and Garrincha.

"Jairzinho was the thrilling heir to the great Garrincha's throne."

— Former Arsenal manager Arsène Wenger in a 1970 World Cup recap for FIFA

In 1968, Botafogo won the Brazilian double. Winners of the 1968 Campeonato Carioca and the Taça Guanabara in which Jairzinho would score nine goals in eleven games. By this time Garrincha had already left Botafogo in 1966 and would enable Jairzinho to play in his natural right wing position. Botafogo would then top off the year with a 3rd trophy towards the end of the year winning the 1968 Campeonato Brasileiro Série A (Taça Brasil) The following 1969 Campeonato Carioca season he would score 7 goals, progressing onto the next 1970 Campeonato Carioca just before the World Cup Jairzinho would finish Botafogo's top scorer with 9 goals.

After Jairzinho's excellent display in Mexico at the 1970 FIFA World Cup more eyes of the world were focused on his Botofogo side. In the final four years of his time at Botafogo, he would go on to cement himself as one of the club's most prolific goalscorers in the history of the club, scoring 186 goals in 416 appearances with a goals per game ratio of 0,45. He ranks sixth in all-time top goal scorers for Botafogo. One of his most standout performances came in 1972, in which he scored a hat-trick vs Flamengo during a famous 6–0 victory, one of the most memorable in Botafogo's history. In the same year, he would also receive the Bronze Award for the South American Footballer of the Year.

=== Marseille ===
In 1974, when the sports legislation in Brazil finally changed, Jairzinho made a 1,250,000 FF (€300,000, £250,000) move to Ligue 1 side Marseille, in October. It was one of the most expensive signings at the time, along with his Botafogo and Brazil teammate Paulo Cézar Caju.

The day before his debut against AS Monaco, more than 10,000 supporters attended an Olympique de Marseille training session to see Jairzinho, who had recently joined the club. Jairzinho scored on his debut in a 4–1 victory over Monaco on 18 October 1974. His arrival generated considerable attention in Marseille, reflecting his status as a member of Brazil's 1970 World Cup-winning team.

"I don't understand what happened. The attendance didn't see, television didn't show images. It's a pity that it went this way... I couldn't continue playing in France. I was sad because Marseille was like my second city. OM remains my second team of heart."

— Jairzinho about his tricky departure of Marseille in a 2022 interview for L'Équipe

Jairzinho would go on to score nine goals in only 18 league games, also notably delivering a memorable performance against Nantes in a victory 4–0 in the Coupe de France, scoring two goals. Though he made an impact with his goals and aura, his time at the French side turned out to be short-lived due to a scuffle in which both Jairzinho and Caju were allegedly found guilty of attacking one of the assistant referees, after a 2–2 draw in the first leg of the Coupe de France quarter-final against Paris Saint-Germain. The Groupement du football professionnel (the former LFP) suspended him and Caju for one year (plus one suspended), thus he ended up leaving in the summer of 1975.

=== Kaizer Chiefs ===
According to Jairzinho, Kaizer Chiefs co-owner Ewert Nene invited him to play a few games in reaction to his Marseille departure. Jairzinho agreed a short-term deal until the start of 1976.

The stadium atmosphere each time he went on the pitch, the warm welcome, and the fact that he was "treated like a king" were the key reasons he agreed to sign, he subsequently said in an interview with the South African newspaper Soccer Laduma in 2018.

Jairzinho rarely played for the Chiefs though in only three league games, he scored seven goals during his time in South Africa.

=== Cruzeiro ===
After the end of Jairzinho's contract in South Africa, he would finally rejoin his home country and reestablish himself as the world class forward he was known for. Jairzinho signed with Cruzeiro at the beginning of 1976, just days before the season campaign started.

Jairzinho would score 31 goals in 43 games across all competitions, finishing second highest goal scorer in the 1976 Copa Libertadores with 12 goals in 12 appearances whilst also winning the trophy, the first one for the Brazilian club. Cruzeiro would then go on to play and ultimately be defeated at the 1976 Intercontinental Cup against Bayern Munich, losing the first leg 2–0 in Germany and drawing 0–0 at home.

Jairzinho would only spend a year at Cruzeiro, however a successful period.

=== Portuguesa ===
Jairzinho, while aged 32 and still seen as a naturally gifted player, surprised his peers when joining Venezuelan side Portuguesa in 1977.

Jairzinho made Portuguesa one of the greatest teams in Venezuelan history, helping Portuguesa win a record 16 games in a row and their fourth of five championships. He scored 22 league goals within 24 games, including three hat-tricks.

=== Noroeste and Fast Clube ===
Towards the final stages of his career, Jairzinho would have a brief spell at Brazilian club Noroeste competing in the 1978 Campeonato Brasileiro Série A, in which Jairzinho would score ten goals.

A year later Jairzinho would join 2nd tier Campeonato Amazonense side Fast Clube and would score another 10 goals throughout the year.

=== Jorge Wilstermann and return to Botafogo ===
In 1980, Jairzinho signed for Bolivian side Jorge Wilstermann aged 35, scoring six goals in the Bolivian league campaign.

In 1981, Jairzinho would return to Botafogo for the last true season of his career, where he was idolised by the upcoming youth players. He would score one goal in a friendly match in 1981; however, he featured in no competitive games.

== International career ==
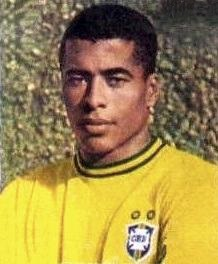
Jairzinho with Brazil in 1970

Jairzinho made his international debut as a 19 year old in 1964 against Portugal, again when Garrincha was injured. He played in the 1966 FIFA World Cup in England; however, with Garrincha back in the side, he played as a left winger. Jairzinho struggled to be effective in this position especially at his young age, and he couldn't prevent Brazil from exiting the competition in the first round. When, after the tournament, Garrincha announced his retirement from international football, Jairzinho finally took over his idol's role for Brazil on the right wing. Jairzinho scored two goals out of the six 1970 FIFA World Cup qualification matches.

"Jairzinho was our strength, our explosiveness. He was the Hurricane. The Hurricane of the cup"

— Brazil legend and teammate Rivellino in a 1970 World Cup recap for FIFA

Now in his new position, Jairzinho became a more effective and consistent performer for country. At the 1970 FIFA World Cup in Mexico, Jairzinho was one of stars of the tournament. He scored in every game Brazil played in for the Seleção, for which he received the epithet "Furacão da Copa" (World Cup Hurricane). His second goal in the team's second group match against Czechoslovakia was one of the most important goals of the tournament: he completed a game changing solo run, beating a total of four players, to unleash a low driven shot to ripple the bottom left corner, which goes down as one of the most memorable goals in World Cup history. During the semi-final match against Uruguay, in addition to scoring a goal, Jairzinho completed a record 13 dribbles; his record was broken in 1994 by Jay-Jay Okocha, who completed 15 in Nigeria's round of 16 tie with Italy.

"Jairzinho was a very strong player, and he just enjoyed a perfect World Cup. I don't think you can give him any less than a 10 out of 10. He was fantastic"

— Former Brazil teammate Clodoaldo Tavares de Santana in a 1970 World Cup recap for FIFA

Jairzinho scored his seventh goal of the tournament in Brazil's 4–1 World Cup win over Italy in the final. However, his impressive goals tally at the finals were not enough to win the Golden Boot, which went to Germany's Gerd Müller, who scored ten goals. Jairzinho has claimed that FIFA awarded him a "best body on the planet" prize for his athleticism; however, FIFA has no record of this award. Throughout the tournament, Jairzinho also completed the most dribbles: 47; this was a record for a single tournament, which was only broken by Argentina's Diego Maradona in 1986.

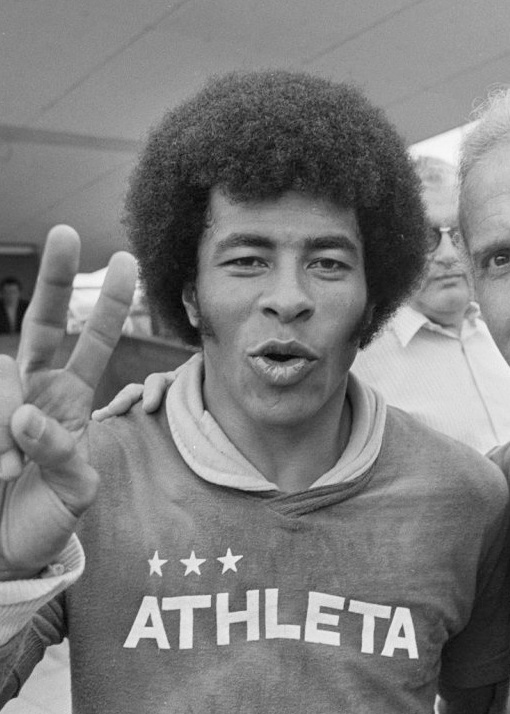
Jairzinho during FIFA World Cup in 1974

Jairzinho scored two goals in the 1974 FIFA World Cup, which would prove to be his last World Cup for Brazil. The third-place final was his last match for Brazil until he was given a one-off farewell cap against Czechoslovakia on 3 March 1982, a game which Brazil drew 1–1. He scored 33 goals in 81 games during his international career.

== Style of play ==
Jairzinho was feared as a versatile forward who could cause damage and pose a serious goal threat from anywhere across the front line. He possessed outstanding pace and explosive acceleration, as well as an excellent first touch and direct dribbling ability. However, his most distinctive attribute was his exceptional physical strength.

On countless occasions, many opposition defences would attempt to double up on Jairzinho and try deny him space in an effort to deny his direct goal threat posed by his athleticism. He would apply himself as a hard working team player who would consistently track back and use his body structure to prevent opposition counterattacks by blocking or tracking runs.

Jairzinho's movement off the ball was one of the key aspects on which he accumulated so many goals throughout his career. In the 1970 FIFA World Cup, he displayed his attacking instincts, especially with his goal against England, which earned Brazil the victory and broke the deadlock. The secondary run off Pelé for him to strike a powerful top left corner finish displayed his threat in front of goal as well as his overall attacking intelligence.

His finishing ability was regularly acclaimed by many coaches and teammates. He also possessed many shots with his left foot which acclaimed him as a complete forward.

Jairzinho was noted for his technical ability and offensive versatility. During open play, he was known to control passes within the penalty area to create shooting opportunities. His playmaking was demonstrated in the 1970 World Cup match against England, where he provided the cross for Pelé's header that resulted in a save by Gordon Banks. Because of his range of skills, sports journalists and historians frequently cite him as one of the most complete forwards in association football history.

== Managerial career ==
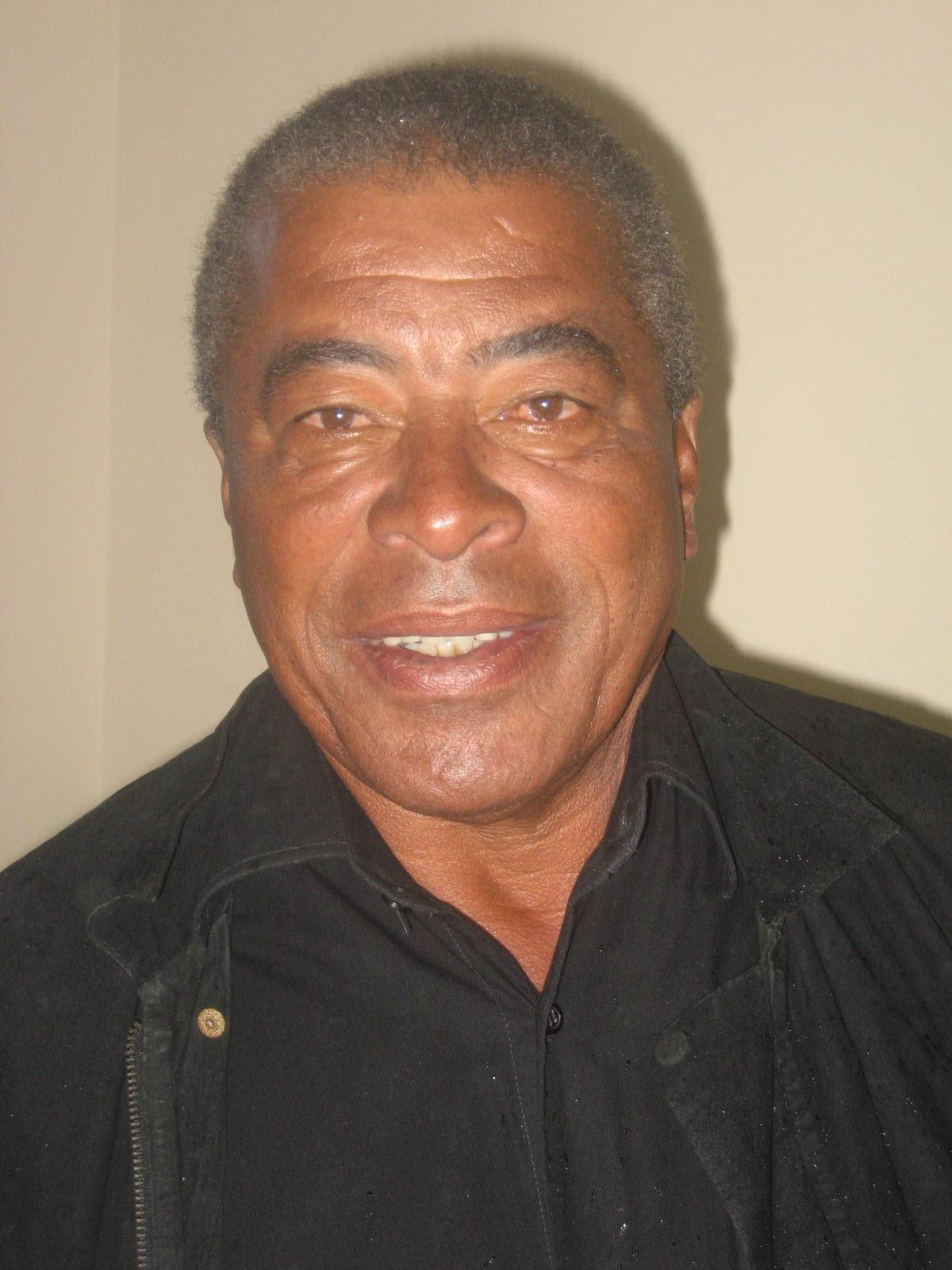
Jairzinho in 2010

After retiring as a footballer, Jairzinho became a coach and managed a number of youth teams in his native Brazil. He also worked in Japan, Saudi Arabia and the United Arab Emirates. In 1997, Jairzinho began his first journey as manager in Europe, being appointed at Greek Super League club Kalamata. He was sacked due to poor results, his side relegated at the end of the season. Jairzinho was named head coach of the Gabon national team. However, he was sacked by Gabon's Football Federation after a crushing defeat against Angola in a World Cup 2006 Qualifier held in Luanda. Perhaps his greatest achievement as a coach was spotting Ronaldo as a 14-year-old whilst he was coaching São Cristóvão. He kick-started the career of the future three-time FIFA World Player of the Year by recommending him to Cruzeiro, his former side, and the Brazil youth team.

== Career statistics ==
Scores and results list Brazil's goal tally first, score column indicates score after each Jairzinho goal.

List of international goals scored by Jairzinho
No.	Date	Venue	Opponent	Score	Result	Competition
1	7 June 1964	Maracanã Stadium, Rio de Janeiro, Brazil	Portugal	2–0	4–1	Taça das Nações
2	12 June 1968	Maracanã Stadium, Rio de Janeiro, Brazil	Uruguay	4–0	4–0	1968 Copa Río Branco
3	20 June 1968	10th-Anniversary Stadium, Warsaw, Poland	Poland	4–2	6–2	Friendly
4	20 June 1968	10th-Anniversary Stadium, Warsaw, Poland	Poland	5–2	6–2	Friendly
5	14 July 1968	Estadio Nacional de Lima, Lima, Peru	Peru	3–3	4–3	Friendly
6	17 July 1968	Estadio Nacional de Lima, Lima, Peru	Peru	4–0	4–0	Friendly
7	7 August 1968	Maracanã Stadium, Rio de Janeiro, Brazil	Argentina	4–0	4–1	Friendly
8	3 November 1968	Mineirão, Belo Horizonte, Brazil	Mexico	1–0	2–1	Friendly
9	7 April 1969	Estádio Beira-Rio, Porto Alegre, Brazil	Peru	1–0	2–1	Friendly
10	12 June 1969	Maracanã Stadium, Rio de Janeiro, Brazil	England	2–1	2–1	Friendly
11	17 August 1969	Estadio Defensores del Chaco, Asunción, Paraguay	Paraguay	2–0	3–0	1970 FIFA World Cup qualification
12	21 August 1969	Maracanã Stadium, Rio de Janeiro, Brazil	Colombia	6–1	6–2	1970 FIFA World Cup qualification
13	24 August 1969	Maracanã Stadium, Rio de Janeiro, Brazil	Venezuela	4–0	6–0	1970 FIFA World Cup qualification
14	8 March 1970	Maracanã Stadium, Rio de Janeiro, Brazil	Argentina	1–0	2–1	Friendly
15	3 June 1970	Estadio Jalisco, Guadalajara, Mexico	Czechoslovakia	3–1	4–1	1970 FIFA World Cup
16	3 June 1970	Estadio Jalisco, Guadalajara, Mexico	Czechoslovakia	4–1	4–1	1970 FIFA World Cup
17	7 June 1970	Estadio Jalisco, Guadalajara, Mexico	England	1–0	1–0	1970 FIFA World Cup
18	10 June 1970	Estadio Jalisco, Guadalajara, Mexico	Romania	2–0	3–2	1970 FIFA World Cup
19	14 June 1970	Estadio Jalisco, Guadalajara, Mexico	Peru	4–2	4–2	1970 FIFA World Cup
20	17 June 1970	Estadio Jalisco, Guadalajara, Mexico	Uruguay	2–1	3–1	1970 FIFA World Cup
21	21 June 1970	Estadio Azteca, Mexico City, Mexico	Italy	3–1	4–1	1970 FIFA World Cup
22	30 September 1970	Maracanã Stadium, Rio de Janeiro, Brazil	Mexico	2–1	3–1	Friendly
23	4 October 1970	Estadio Nacional Julio Martínez Prádanos, Santiago, Chile	Chile	3–0	5–1	Friendly
24	4 October 1970	Estadio Nacional Julio Martínez Prádanos, Santiago, Chile	Chile	4–0	5–1	Friendly
25	2 July 1972	Estádio do Morumbi, São Paulo, Brazil	Yugoslavia	3–0	3–0	Brazil Independence Cup
26	5 July 1972	Maracanã Stadium, Rio de Janeiro, Brazil	Scotland	1–0	1–0	Brazil Independence Cup
27	9 July 1972	Maracanã Stadium, Rio de Janeiro, Brazil	Portugal	1–0	1–0	Brazil Independence Cup
28	13 June 1973	Praterstadion, Vienna, Austria	Austria	1–1	1–1	Friendly
29	21 June 1973	Central Lenin Stadium, Moscow, Soviet Union	Soviet Union	1–0	1–0	Friendly
30	31 March 1974	Maracanã Stadium, Rio de Janeiro, Brazil	Mexico	1–1	1–1	Friendly
31	14 April 1974	Maracanã Stadium, Rio de Janeiro, Brazil	Bulgaria	1–0	1–0	Friendly
32	22 June 1974	Parkstadion, Gelsenkirchen, West Germany	Zaire	1–0	3–0	1974 FIFA World Cup
33	30 June 1974	Niedersachsenstadion, Hanover, West Germany	Argentina	2–1	2–1	1974 FIFA World Cup

== Personal life ==
Jairzinho's son, Jair Ventura, is also a former footballer who managed Corinthians, Botafogo and Santos.

In his retirement, Jairzinho runs a football school for underprivileged children in the favelas of Rio de Janeiro.

== Filmography ==
- 1985 Krush Groove as Trey Hudgens
- 1993 Who's the Man? as Colyson Becker

== Honours ==
Botafogo

- Campeonato Brasileiro: 1968
- Campeonato Carioca: 1961, 1962, 1967, 1968
- Torneio Rio – São Paulo: 1964, 1966

Cruzeiro

- Campeonato Mineiro: 1975
- Copa Libertadores: 1976

Portuguesa

- Primera División: 1977
- Copa Venezuela: 1977

Jorge Wilstermann

- Bolivian Primera División: 1980, 1981

Brazil

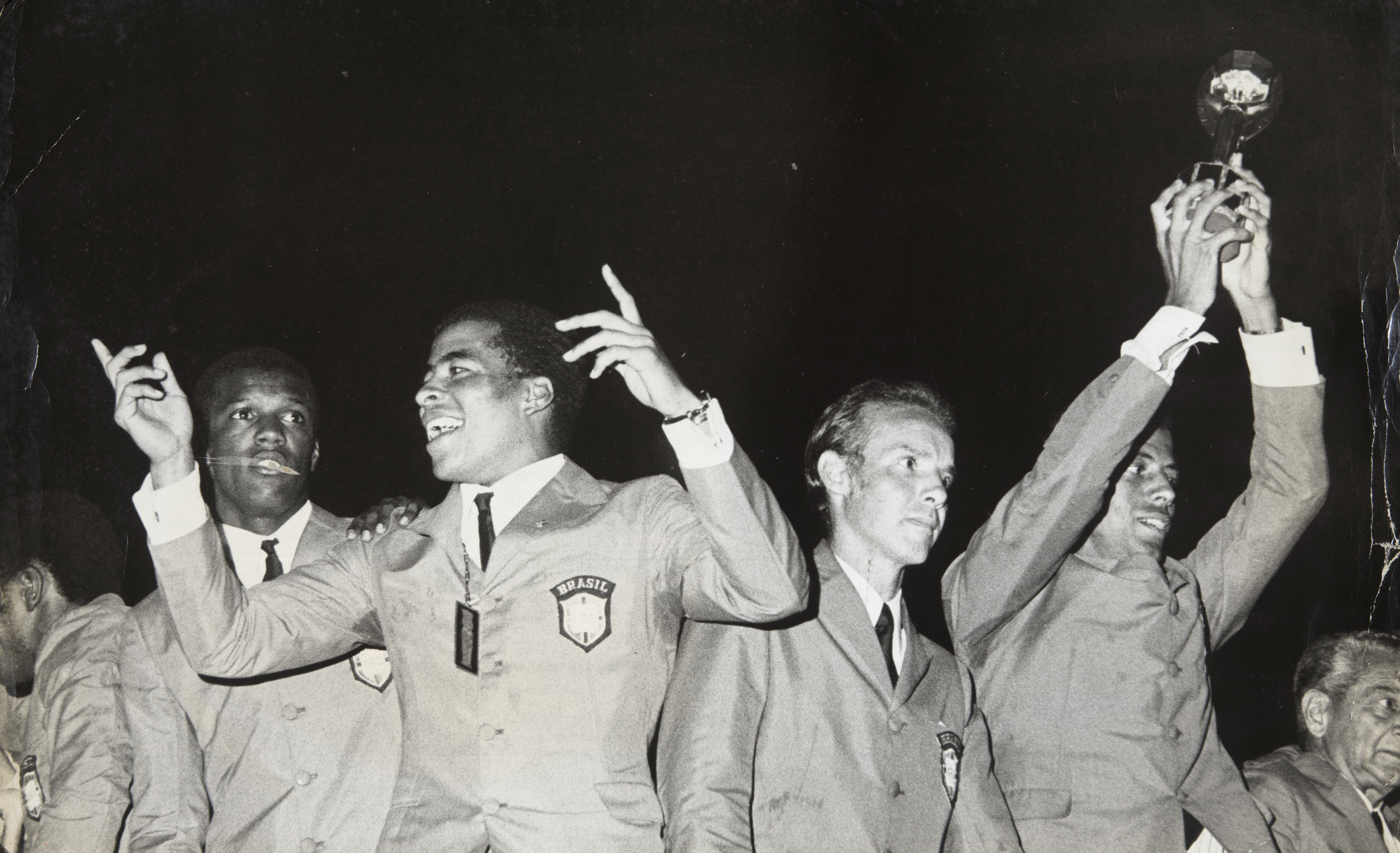
Jairzinho celebrating with teammates after World Cup win

- FIFA World Cup: 1970
- Pan American Games: 1963
- Independence Cup: 1972

Individual

- FIFA World Cup Silver Boot: 1970
- FIFA World Cup All-Star Team: 1970
- World Soccer World XI: 1971, 1972
- South American Player of the Year Bronze award: 1972
- World Soccer: 27th Greatest Player of the 20th Century
- IFFHS Brazilian Player of the 20th Century (19th place)
- Brazilian Football Museum Hall of Fame
- International Football Hall of Fame: 16th place (1997)
