= Telê Santana =

Brazilian footballer and manager

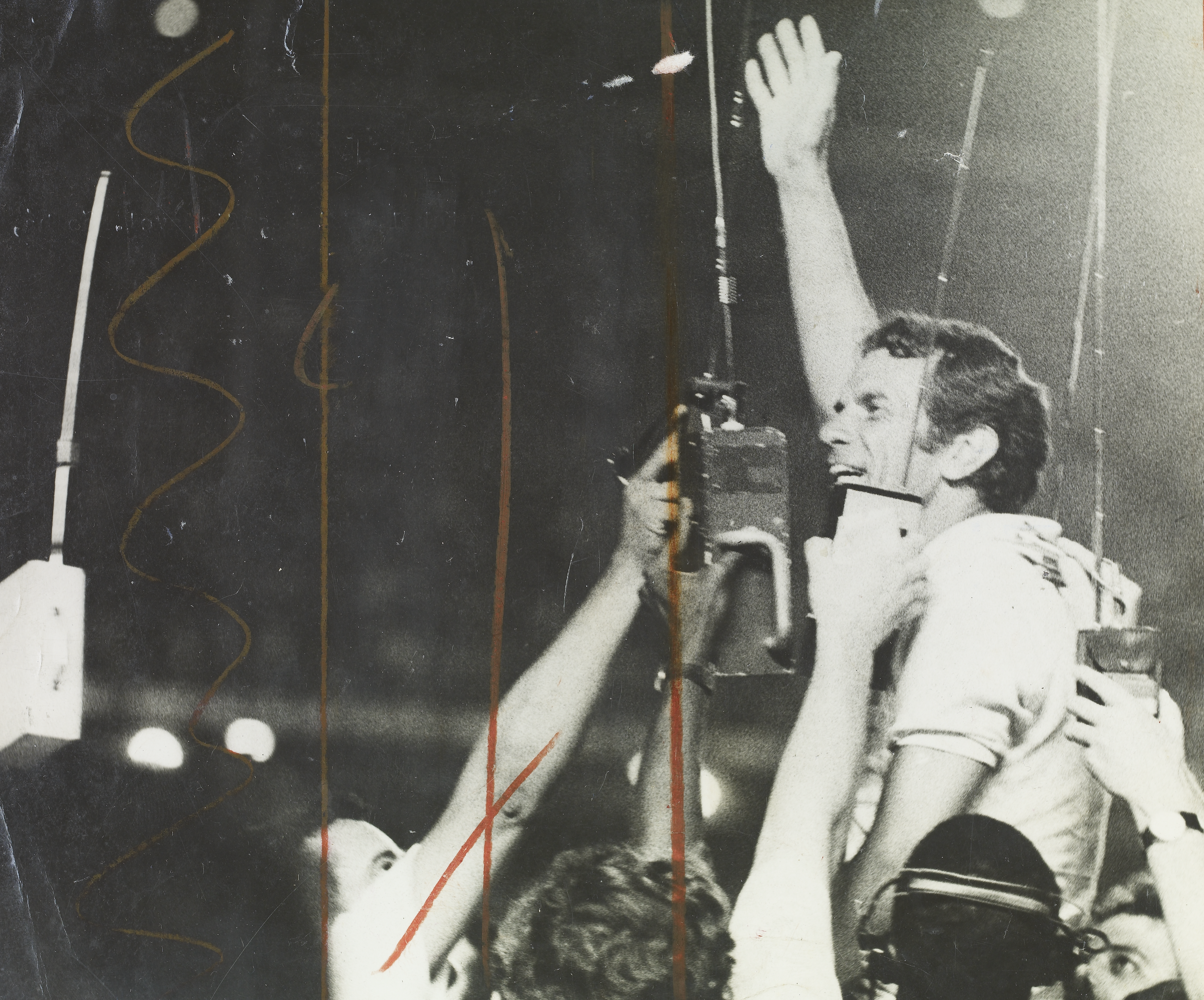
- Telê Santana holding a São Paulo F.C. jersey

Personal information
- Full name: Telê Santana da Silva
- Date of birth: 26 July 1931
- Place of birth: Itabirito, Brazil
- Date of death: 21 April 2006 (aged 74)
- Place of death: Belo Horizonte, Brazil
- Position: Winger

Senior career*
| Years | Team | Apps | (Gls) |
| 1951–1960 | Fluminense | 557 | (162) |
| 1960–1962 | Guarani | | |
| 1963 | Vasco da Gama | | |

Managerial career
- 1969–1970: Fluminense
- 1970–1972: Atlético Mineiro
- 1973: São Paulo
- 1973–1975: Atlético Mineiro
- 1976: Botafogo
- 1976–1978: Grêmio
- 1979–1980: Palmeiras
- 1980–1982: Brazil
- 1983–1985: Al-Ahli
- 1985–1986: Brazil
- 1987–1988: Atlético Mineiro
- 1988–1989: Flamengo
- 1989: Fluminense
- 1990: Palmeiras
- 1990–1996: São Paulo
- * Club domestic league appearances and goals

Telê Santana da Silva, also known as Telê Santana (July 26, 1931 – April 21, 2006) was a Brazilian football manager and former player (right winger). He was born in Itabirito, Minas Gerais.

Santana was the manager of the famous 1982 and 1986 Brazil national squads. The 1982 squad, which consisted of players such as Zico, Sócrates, Falcão, Júnior and Toninho Cerezo, is widely considered one of the best sides to never win the World Cup. Santana was also a highly successful manager of various club teams, including the legendary twice Intercontinental champions São Paulo (1992 and 1993), and was also very influential with Atlético Mineiro and Fluminense.

Santana is often mentioned by the Brazilian sports press as being one of the most relevant football managers to ever work in the country. His preferred style of play was very offensive-minded, and he believed in training athletes by using relentless repetition of elementary fundamentals of the game, such as passing the ball and set piece training.

== Career ==
=== First experiences ===
Santana started playing for Itabirense Esporte Clube, headquartered near his home in Itabirito, and later played for América, from São João del-Rei.

=== Playing career ===
Santana played for clubs such as Fluminense, Madureira and Vasco da Gama. He was also a reserve player of the Brazil national football team. As a player, his preferred position was centre forward. However, he started his career as a goalkeeper.

=== Managerial career ===
His career as a manager started in 1967, coaching the Fluminense youth squad. Four years later, Santana led Atlético Mineiro to win its first Brazilian championship title. Santana coached the Brazil squads of the 1982 and 1986 World Cups, both of which are regarded as among the greatest teams in the tournament's history to never win the competition.

After 1986, Santana returned to club management and took charge of Flamengo in 1988 before beginning a highly successful spell with São Paulo in 1990. With a talented squad featuring players such as Zetti, Cafu, Raí, and Leonardo, São Paulo won the Brazilian championship title in 1991, followed by consecutive Copa Libertadores titles in 1992 and 1993 – the first won by a Brazilian club since 1983.

Santana's spell at São Paulo is most celebrated for its back-to-back Intercontinental Cup victories in Tokyo, beating first Johan Cruyff's FC Barcelona in 1992 and then Fabio Capello's A.C. Milan in 1993. Santana's São Paulo side is widely regarded as one of the greatest club sides in Brazilian football.

== Legacy ==
Santana is widely recognised as one of the greatest exponents of Futebol Arte, a school of football centred on technical excellence, attacking football and fair play. Santana's philosophy was best embodied by the 1982 Brazil national squad, which was eliminated by Italy after a 3–2 defeat in the knockout stage. Santana was heavily criticised for refusing to adopt a more defensive approach against Italy, as Brazil only required a draw to reach the semifinals under the tournament format at the time. While Santana never led the Brazilian squad to glory, he is still regarded as one of greatest managers and innovators in the history of Brazilian football.

Santana has expressed admiration for the 1974 Netherlands side, stating, "my greatest satisfaction would be to manage a team such as 1974 Holland. It was a team where you could pick [Johan] Cruyff and place him on the right wing. If I had to put him in the left-wing, he would still play [the same]. I could choose Neeskens, who played both to the right and to the left of the midfield. Thus, everyone played in any position." He said he tried to use a similar tactical strategy in 1992's São Paulo, by using versatile players in different positions according to what was required in a match.

Santana has been described as the "last romantic of Brazilian football", and had always been a strong advocate for fair play and against violence in the game.

== Death ==
In 1996, Santana retired from coaching after suffering a stroke. He had part of his left leg amputated in 2003 because of ischemia in his left foot. He was operated at Hospital Felício Roxo, in Belo Horizonte.

Santana died on April 21, 2006, due to an abdominal infection. His body was buried at Cemitério Parque da Colina, in Belo Horizonte. He is survived by his wife Ivonete and their son and daughter.

== Managerial statistics ==
| Team | Nation | From | To | Record | | | | | | | |
| Team | Nation | From | To | G | W | D | L | F | A | GD | Win % |
|---|---|---|---|---|---|---|---|---|---|---|---|
| Fluminense | Brazil | 1969 | 1969 | 44 | 23 | 11 | 10 | 66 | 40 | +26 | 52.27 |
| Atlético Mineiro | Brazil | 1970 | 1972 | 149 | 76 | 46 | 27 | 223 | 117 | +105 | 51.01 |
| São Paulo | Brazil | 1973 | 1973 | 30 | 11 | 13 | 6 | 30 | 24 | +6 | 36.67 |
| Atlético Mineiro | Brazil | 1973 | 1975 | 151 | 82 | 37 | 32 | 243 | 125 | +118 | 54.3 |
| Botafogo | Brazil | 1976 | 1976 | 21 | 11 | 4 | 6 | 29 | 17 | +12 | 52.38 |
| Gremio | Brazil | 1976 | 1978 | 130 | 79 | 31 | 20 | 249 | 86 | +163 | 60.77 |
| Palmeiras | Brazil | 1979 | 1980 | 56 | 30 | 15 | 11 | 105 | 51 | +54 | 53.57 |
| Brazil | Brazil | 2 April 1980 | 5 July 1982 | 38 | 29 | 6 | 3 | 74 | 25 | +49 | 76.32 |
| Al-Ahli | Saudi Arabia | 1983 | 1985 | 52 | 32 | 14 | 6 | 74 | 29 | +45 | 61.54 |
| Brazil | Brazil | 2 June 1985 | 21 June 1986 | 17 | 11 | 4 | 2 | 45 | 12 | +33 | 64.71 |
| Atlético Mineiro | Brazil | 1987 | 1988 | 102 | 52 | 34 | 11 | 143 | 72 | +71 | 50.98 |
| Flamengo | Brazil | 1988 | 1989 | 62 | 37 | 15 | 10 | 74 | 39 | +45 | 64.71 |
| Fluminense | Brazil | 1989 | 1989 | 28 | 9 | 6 | 13 | 24 | 35 | -11 | 32.14 |
| Palmeiras | Brazil | 1990 | 1990 | 47 | 22 | 12 | 13 | 54 | 31 | +23 | 46.81 |
| São Paulo | Brazil | 1990 | 1996 | 391 | 191 | 114 | 86 | 603 | 375 | +228 | 48.85 |
| Total | | | | 1,318 | 695 | 362 | 261 | 2,036 | 1,078 | +955 | 52.73 |

As of 11 July 2023

== Honours ==
=== As a Player ===
Club
Fluminense

- Campeonato Carioca: 1951, 1959
- Torneio Rio-São Paulo: 1957, 1960
- Copa Rio: 1952

=== As a Manager ===
Club
Fluminense

- Campeonato Carioca: 1969

Atlético Mineiro

- Campeonato Mineiro: 1970, 1988
- Campeonato Brasileiro Série A: 1971

Grêmio

- Campeonato Gaúcho: 1977

Al-Ahli

- King's Cup: 1983
- Saudi Pro League: 1983–84
- Gulf Club Champions Cup: 1985

São Paulo

- Campeonato Paulista: 1991, 1992
- Campeonato Brasileiro Série A: 1991
- Copa Libertadores: 1992, 1993
- Intercontinental Cup: 1992, 1993
- Recopa Sudamericana: 1993, 1994
- Supercopa Sudamericana: 1993
- Copa CONMEBOL: 1994

Individual

- 1992 - South American Coach of the Year

== See also ==
- List of football managers with the most matches

== Notes ==
| Preceded by Alfio Basile | South American Coach of the Year; 1992 | Succeeded by Francisco Maturana |
