= 1939 South American Championship squads =

List of footballers

The following squads were named for the 1939 South American Championship that took place in Peru.

== Chile ==
Head coach: (Uruguay) Pedro Mazullo

No.	Pos.	Player	Date of birth (age)	Caps	Goals	Club
—	FW	José Avendaño	2 August 1912 (aged 26)	7	1	(Football Federation of Chile) Magallanes
—	MF	Voltaire Carvajal	11 February 1917 (aged 21)	0	0	(Football Federation of Chile) Unión Española
—	DF	Jorge Córdova	5 April 1913 (aged 25)	5	0	(Football Federation of Chile) Magallanes
—	DF	Julio Córdova	7 February 1911 (aged 27)	0	0	(Football Federation of Chile) Magallanes
—	DF	Ascanio Cortés	5 July 1914 (aged 24)	8	0	(Football Federation of Chile) Audax Italiano
—	MF	Alfonso Domínguez	18 December 1916 (aged 22)	0	0	(Football Federation of Chile) Unión Española
—	GK	Augusto Lobos	10 July 1912 (aged 26)	0	0	(Football Federation of Chile) Santiago Morning
—	FW	Roberto Luco	9 January 1907 (aged 32)	0	0	(Football Federation of Chile) Colo-Colo
—	MF	Felipe Mediavilla	13 June 1913 (aged 25)	0	0	(Football Federation of Chile) Unión Española
—	MF	Juan Montero	1 January 1910 (aged 29)	5	0	(Football Federation of Chile) Colo-Colo
—	FW	Raúl Muñoz	28 April 1919 (aged 19)	0	0	(Football Federation of Chile) Magallanes
—	FW	Gustavo Pizarro	24 April 1916 (aged 22)	0	0	(Football Federation of Chile) Bádminton
—	MF	Luis Ponce	6 June 1910 (aged 28)	3	0	(Football Federation of Chile) Magallanes
—	DF	Guillermo Riveros	10 February 1906 (aged 32)	10	1	(Football Federation of Chile) Audax Italiano
—	DF	Humberto Roa	21 February 1912 (aged 26)	0	0	(Football Federation of Chile) Audax Italiano
—	GK	Eduardo Simián	16 November 1915 (aged 23)	0	0	(Football Federation of Chile) Universidad de Chile
—	FW	Enrique Sorrel	3 February 1912 (aged 26)	1	0	(Football Federation of Chile) Colo-Colo
—	FW	Raúl Toro	21 February 1911 (aged 27)	5	7	(Football Federation of Chile) Santiago Wanderers

== Ecuador ==
Head coach: (Ecuador) Ramón Unamuno

No.	Pos.	Player	Date of birth (age)	Caps	Goals	Club
—	FW	Marino Alcívar	21 May 1916 (aged 22)	0	0	(Ecuadorian Football Federation) Emelec
—	FW	Manuel Arenas	10 April 1912 (aged 26)	1	0	(Ecuadorian Football Federation) Panamá
—	MF	Luis Arias		0	0	(Ecuadorian Football Federation)
—	FW	Fonfredes Bohórquez		0	0	(Ecuadorian Football Federation)
—	FW	Ernesto Cevallos		0	0	(Ecuadorian Football Federation)
—	FW	Leónidas Elizalde		0	0	(Ecuadorian Football Federation)
—	FW	César Augusto Freire	18 November 1911 (aged 27)	0	0	(Ecuadorian Football Federation)
—	FW	Enrique Herrera		0	0	(Ecuadorian Football Federation) Panamá
—	DF	Luis Hungría	25 August 1915 (aged 23)	0	0	(Ecuadorian Football Federation) Panamá
—	MF	Jorge Laurido		0	0	(Ecuadorian Football Federation)
—	DF	Aurelio Lavayen		0	0	(Ecuadorian Football Federation)
—	GK	Francisco Martínez		0	0	(Ecuadorian Football Federation)
—	MF	José Merino	15 April 1915 (aged 23)	0	0	(Ecuadorian Football Federation)
—	DF	Jorge Naranjo		0	0	(Ecuadorian Football Federation)
—	MF	José Peralta		0	0	(Ecuadorian Football Federation)
—	DF	Eloy Ronquillo		0	0	(Ecuadorian Football Federation) Panamá
—	DF	Augusto Solís		0	0	(Ecuadorian Football Federation)
—	FW	Alfonso Suárez Rizzo	24 June 1913 (aged 25)	0	0	(Football Association of Cuba) Hispano América
—	FW	Ramón Unamuno	4 February 1908 (aged 30)	0	0	(Ecuadorian Football Federation) Panamá
—	MF	José Vasconez		0	0	(Ecuadorian Football Federation)
—	GK	Humberto Vásquez		0	0	(Ecuadorian Football Federation)
—	MF	Arturo Zambrano		0	0	(Ecuadorian Football Federation)

== Paraguay ==
Head coach: (Paraguay) Manuel Fleitas Solich

No.	Pos.	Player	Date of birth (age)	Caps	Goals	Club
—	FW	Ricardo Aquino		0	0	(Paraguayan Football Association)
—	MF	Diego Ayala		4	0	(Paraguayan Football Association) Libertad
—	FW	Eustaquio Bareiro		0	0	(Paraguayan Football Association)
—	FW	Marcial Barrios	26 June 1919 (aged 19)	1	0	(Paraguayan Football Association) Olimpia
—	GK	Víctor Encina		0	0	(Paraguayan Football Association)
—	MF	Fidelino Etcheverry		0	0	(Paraguayan Football Association)
—	DF	Esteban Ferreira		0	0	(Paraguayan Football Association)
—	FW	Tiberio Godoy		0	0	(Paraguayan Football Association) Olimpia
—	MF	Milciades Gómez Benítez		0	0	(Paraguayan Football Association)
—	GK	Manuel González		5	0	(Paraguayan Football Association)
—	MF	José Ibáñez		0	0	(Paraguayan Football Association)
—	DF	Antonio Invernizzi		5	0	(Paraguayan Football Association) Libertad
—	DF	Juan Félix Lezcano		3	0	(Paraguayan Football Association)
—	FW	Eduardo Mingo		0	0	(Paraguayan Football Association)
—	DF	Gabino Morin		0	0	(Paraguayan Football Association)
—	FW	Raúl Núñez Velloso		2	1	(Paraguayan Football Association)
—	MF	Miguel Ortega	5 July 1917 (aged 21)	5	0	(Argentine Football Association) Gimnasia y Esgrima (LP)
—	DF	Eduardo Romero		0	0	(Paraguayan Football Association)
—	DF	Lorenzo Velloso		0	0	(Paraguayan Football Association) Nacional
—	FW	Jacinto Villalba	19 September 1914 (aged 24)	0	0	(Paraguayan Football Association)

== Peru ==
Head coach: (England) Jack Greenwell

No.	Pos.	Player	Date of birth (age)	Caps	Goals	Club
—	FW	Jorge Alcalde	5 December 1911 (aged 27)	12	8	(Peruvian Football Federation) Sport Boys
—	MF	Teodoro Alcalde	20 September 1913 (aged 25)	2	0	(Peruvian Football Federation) Sport Boys
—	FW	Alberto Baldovino	13 April 1917 (aged 21)	0	0	(Peruvian Football Federation) Universitario de Deportes
—	FW	Víctor Bielich	17 August 1916 (aged 22)	0	0	(Peruvian Football Federation) Deportivo Municipal
—	MF	Segundo Castillo	17 July 1917 (aged 21)	6	0	(Peruvian Football Federation) Sport Boys
—	DF	Raúl Chappell	23 July 1911 (aged 27)	0	0	(Peruvian Football Federation) Sport Boys
—	DF	Arturo Fernández	3 February 1910 (aged 28)	10	0	(Peruvian Football Federation) Universitario de Deportes
—	FW	Teodoro Fernández	20 May 1913 (aged 25)	13	12	(Peruvian Football Federation) Universitario de Deportes
—	GK	Juan Honores	24 March 1915 (aged 23)	3	0	(Peruvian Football Federation) Universitario de Deportes
—	FW	Pedro Ibáñez	29 May 1912 (aged 26)	3	0	(Peruvian Football Federation) Sport Boys
—	DF	Rafael León		0	0	(Peruvian Football Federation) Atlético Chalaco
—	MF	Feder Larios		0	0	(Peruvian Football Federation) Alfonso Ugarte
—	FW	Adelfo Magallanes	29 August 1910 (aged 28)	6	1	(Peruvian Football Federation) Alianza Lima
—	FW	Arturo Paredes	6 October 1913 (aged 25)	3	0	(Peruvian Football Federation) Sport Boys
—	MF	Jorge Parró		0	0	(Peruvian Football Federation) Deportivo Municipal
—	MF	Pablo Pasache	1 February 1915 (aged 23)	0	0	(Peruvian Football Federation) Deportivo Municipal
—	DF	Enrique Perales	18 January 1914 (aged 24)	0	0	(Peruvian Football Federation) Universitario de Deportes
—	DF	Juan Quispe	18 July 1914 (aged 24)	0	0	(Peruvian Football Federation) Alianza Lima
—	MF	Pedro Reyes		0	0	(Peruvian Football Federation) Santiago Barranco
—	FW	César Socarraz	5 June 1910 (aged 28)	0	0	(Peruvian Football Federation) Universitario de Deportes
—	MF	Carlos Tovar	2 April 1914 (aged 24)	9	0	(Peruvian Football Federation) Universitario de Deportes
—	GK	Juan Humberto Valdivieso	6 May 1910 (aged 28)	7	0	(Peruvian Football Federation) Alianza Lima

== Uruguay ==
Head coach: (Uruguay) Alberto Suppici

No.	Pos.	Player	Date of birth (age)	Caps	Goals	Club
—	FW	Adelaido Camaití		6	1	(Uruguayan Football Association) Peñarol
—	FW	Aníbal Ciocca	23 June 1912 (aged 26)	9	4	(Uruguayan Football Association) Nacional
—	FW	Oscar Chirimini	28 March 1917 (aged 21)	3	0	(Uruguayan Football Association) River Plate
—	FW	Roberto Fager		1	0	(Uruguayan Football Association) Montevideo Wanderers
—	MF	Eugenio Galvalisi	15 November 1915 (aged 23)	6	0	(Uruguayan Football Association) Nacional
—	GK	Horacio Granero	23 January 1916 (aged 22)	0	0	(Uruguayan Football Association) Central Español
—	FW	Pedro Lago		2	0	(Uruguayan Football Association) Peñarol
—	DF	Ernesto Mascheroni	21 November 1907 (aged 31)	10	0	(Uruguayan Football Association) Peñarol
—	GK	Aníbal Luis Paz	21 May 1917 (aged 21)	0	0	(Uruguayan Football Association) Bella Vista
—	FW	Roberto Porta	7 June 1913 (aged 25)	4	0	(Uruguayan Football Association) Nacional
—	MF	Abdón Reyes		0	0	(Uruguayan Football Association) Sud América
—	FW	Plácido Rodríguez		0	0	(Uruguayan Football Association) Rampla Juniors
—	DF	Manuel Sanguinetti	25 March 1917 (aged 21)	1	0	(Uruguayan Football Association) River Plate
—	MF	Obdulio Varela	20 September 1917 (aged 21)	0	0	(Uruguayan Football Association) Montevideo Wanderers
—	FW	Severino Varela	14 September 1913 (aged 25)	11	7	(Uruguayan Football Association) Peñarol
—	MF	General Viana	3 December 1913 (aged 25)	0	0	(Uruguayan Football Association) Central Español
—	DF	Félix Zaccour	8 November 1906 (aged 32)	0	0	(Uruguayan Football Association) Sud América
—	DF	Erebo Zunino		8	0	(Uruguayan Football Association) Peñarol
