= Chile national football team results (1910–1959) =

This page details the match results and statistics of the Chile national football team from 1910 to 1959.

== Key ==
Key to matches

- Att.=Match attendance
- (H)=Home ground
- (A)=Away ground
- (N)=Neutral ground

Key to record by opponent

- Pld=Games played
- W=Games won
- D=Games drawn
- L=Games lost
- GF=Goals for
- GA=Goals against

== Results ==
Chile's score is shown first in each case.

No.	Date	Venue	Opponents	Score	Competition	Chile scorers	Att.	Ref.
1	27 May 1910	Belgrano, Buenos Aires (A)	Argentina	1–3	Friendly	Simmons	6,200	
2	29 May 1910	Colegiales, Buenos Aires (N)	Uruguay	0–3	Copa Centenario Revolución de Mayo		6,000	
3	5 June 1910	Estadio GEBA, Buenos Aires (A)	Argentina	1–5	Copa Centenario Revolución de Mayo	Campbell	2,500	
4	11 September 1910	Viña del Mar (H)	Argentina	0–3	Friendly		7,200	
5	21 September 1913	Valparaiso Sporting Club, Viña del Mar (H)	Argentina	0–2	Friendly		—	
6	2 July 1916	Estadio GEBA, Buenos Aires (N)	Uruguay	0–4	1916 South American Championship		3,000	
7	6 July 1916	Estadio GEBA, Buenos Aires (N)	Argentina	1–6	1916 South American Championship	Báez	18,000	
8	8 July 1916	Estadio GEBA, Buenos Aires (N)	Brazil	1–1	1916 South American Championship	Salazar	15,000	
9	12 July 1916	Estadio GEBA, Buenos Aires (A)	Argentina	0–1	Friendly		—	
10	14 July 1916	Montevideo (A)	Uruguay	1–4	Friendly	France	6,000	
11	30 September 1917	Parque Pereira, Montevideo (N)	Uruguay	0–4	1917 South American Championship		22,000	
12	6 October 1917	Parque Pereira, Montevideo (N)	Argentina	0–1	1917 South American Championship		15,000	
13	12 October 1917	Parque Pereira, Montevideo (N)	Brazil	0–5	1917 South American Championship		10,000	
14	21 October 1917	Estadio Racing Club, Avellaneda (A)	Argentina	1–1	Friendly	France	10,000	
15	11 May 1919	Estádio das Laranjeiras, Rio de Janeiro (N)	Brazil	0–6	1919 South American Championship		20,000	
16	17 May 1919	Estádio das Laranjeiras, Rio de Janeiro (N)	Uruguay	0–2	1919 South American Championship		8,000	
17	22 May 1919	Estádio das Laranjeiras, Rio de Janeiro (N)	Argentina	1–4	1919 South American Championship	France	15,000	
18	11 September 1920	Valparaiso Sporting Club, Viña del Mar (N)	Brazil	0–1	1920 South American Championship		15,000	
19	20 September 1920	Valparaiso Sporting Club, Viña del Mar (N)	Argentina	1–1	1920 South American Championship	Bolados	16,000	
20	26 September 1920	Valparaiso Sporting Club, Viña del Mar (N)	Uruguay	1–2	1920 South American Championship	Au. Domínguez	16,000	
21	17 September 1922	Estádio das Laranjeiras, Rio de Janeiro (N)	Brazil	1–1	1922 South American Championship	Bravo	30,000	
22	23 September 1922	Estádio das Laranjeiras, Rio de Janeiro (N)	Uruguay	0–2	1922 South American Championship		12,000	
23	28 September 1922	Estádio das Laranjeiras, Rio de Janeiro (N)	Argentina	0–4	1922 South American Championship		2,500	
24	5 October 1922	Estádio das Laranjeiras, Rio de Janeiro (N)	Paraguay	0–3	1922 South American Championship		1,000	
25	22 October 1922	Estadio Sportivo Barracas, Buenos Aires (A)	Argentina	0–1	Friendly		—	
26	19 October 1924	Parque Central, Montevideo (N)	Uruguay	0–5	1924 South American Championship		15,000	
27	25 October 1924	Parque Central, Montevideo (N)	Argentina	0–2	1924 South American Championship		15,000	
28	1 November 1924	Parque Central, Montevideo (N)	Paraguay	1–3	1924 South American Championship	Arellano	1,000	
29	12 October 1926	Estadio Sport de Ñuñoa, Santiago (N)	Bolivia	7–1	1926 South American Championship	M. Ramírez, Subiabre, Arellano (4), H. Moreno	12,000	
30	17 October 1926	Estadio Sport de Ñuñoa, Santiago (N)	Uruguay	1–3	1926 South American Championship	Subiabre	13,000	
31	31 October 1926	Estadio Sport de Ñuñoa, Santiago (N)	Argentina	1–1	1926 South American Championship	Saavedra	8,000	
32	3 November 1926	Estadio Sport de Ñuñoa, Santiago (N)	Paraguay	5–1	1926 South American Championship	Arellano (3), M. Ramírez (2)	6,000	
33	10 December 1927	Santiago (H)	Uruguay	2–3	Friendly	Alfaro (2)	—	
34	27 May 1928	Olympic Stadium, Amsterdam (N)	Portugal	2–4	1928 Summer Olympics	Subiabre, Carbonell	2,309	
35	5 June 1928	Monnikenhuize, Arnhem (N)	Mexico	3–1	1928 Summer Olympics	Subiabre (3)	6,000	
36	8 June 1928	Sparta Stadion Het Kasteel, Rotterdam (N)	Netherlands	2–2	1928 Summer Olympics	Bravo, Alfaro	18,000	
37	16 July 1930	Parque Central, Montevideo (N)	Mexico	3–0	1930 FIFA World Cup	Vidal (2), Rosas (o.g.)	9,249	
38	19 July 1930	Estadio Centenario, Montevideo (N)	France	1–0	1930 FIFA World Cup	Subiabre	2,000	
39	22 July 1930	Estadio Centenario, Montevideo (N)	Argentina	1–3	1930 FIFA World Cup	Arellano	41,459	
40	6 January 1935	Original Estadio Nacional, Lima (N)	Argentina	1–4	1935 South American Championship	Carmona	25,000	
41	18 January 1935	Original Estadio Nacional, Lima (N)	Uruguay	1–2	1935 South American Championship	Giudice	13,000	
42	26 January 1935	Original Estadio Nacional, Lima (N)	Peru	0–1	1935 South American Championship		12,000	
43	30 December 1936	Estadio Gasómetro, Buenos Aires (N)	Argentina	1–2	1937 South American Championship	Toro	35,000	
44	3 January 1937	Estadio Boca Juniors, Buenos Aires (N)	Brazil	4–6	1937 South American Championship	Avendaño, Toro (2), Riveros	20,000	
45	10 January 1937	Estadio Gasómetro, Buenos Aires (N)	Uruguay	3–0	1937 South American Championship	Toro (2), Arancibia	18,000	
46	17 January 1937	Estadio Gasómetro, Buenos Aires (N)	Paraguay	2–3	1937 South American Championship	Toro (2)	12,000	
47	21 January 1937	Estadio Gasómetro, Buenos Aires (N)	Peru	2–2	1937 South American Championship	Torres, Carmona	8,000	
48	15 January 1939	Original Estadio Nacional, Lima (N)	Paraguay	1–5	1939 South American Championship	Sorrel	10,000	
49	22 January 1939	Original Estadio Nacional, Lima (N)	Peru	1–3	1939 South American Championship	Al. Domínguez	6,000	
50	29 January 1939	Original Estadio Nacional, Lima (N)	Uruguay	2–3	1939 South American Championship	R. Muñoz, Luco	15,000	
51	5 February 1939	Original Estadio Nacional, Lima (N)	Ecuador	4–1	1939 South American Championship	Toro, Avendaño (2), Sorrel	10,000	
52	26 February 1939	Santiago (H)	Paraguay	4–1	Friendly	Toro (3), Sorrel	—	
53	2 March 1940	Estadio de Chacarita Juniors, Buenos Aires (A)	Argentina	1–4	Copa Presidente de Chile	Sorrel	—	
54	9 March 1940	Estadio Gasómetro, Buenos Aires (A)	Argentina	2–3	Copa Presidente de Chile	Pizarro, H. Muñoz	—	
55	12 March 1940	Montevideo (A)	Uruguay	2–3	Friendly	Luco, Diaz	—	
56	5 January 1941	Estadio Nacional, Santiago (H)	Argentina	1–2	Copa Presidente de Argentina	Alonso	—	
57	9 January 1941	Estadio Nacional, Santiago (H)	Argentina	2–5	Copa Presidente de Argentina	Sorrel, Balbuena	—	
58	2 February 1941	Estadio Nacional, Santiago (N)	Ecuador	5–0	1941 South American Championship	Toro, Sorrel (2), Pérez, Contreras	40,000	
59	9 February 1941	Estadio Nacional, Santiago (N)	Peru	1–0	1941 South American Championship	Pérez	70,000	
60	16 February 1941	Estadio Nacional, Santiago (N)	Uruguay	0–2	1941 South American Championship		70,000	
61	4 March 1941	Estadio Nacional, Santiago (N)	Argentina	0–1	1941 South American Championship		70,000	
62	10 January 1942	Estadio Centenario, Montevideo (N)	Uruguay	1–6	1942 South American Championship	Contreras	40,000	
63	14 January 1942	Estadio Centenario, Montevideo (N)	Brazil	1–6	1942 South American Championship	Al. Domínguez	10,000	
64	22 January 1942	Estadio Centenario, Montevideo (N)	Paraguay	0–2	1942 South American Championship		25,000	
65	31 January 1942	Estadio Centenario, Montevideo (N)	Argentina	0–0	1942 South American Championship		15,000	
66	5 February 1942	Estadio Centenario, Montevideo (N)	Ecuador	2–1	1942 South American Championship	Al. Domínguez, Armingol	15,000	
67	7 February 1942	Estadio Centenario, Montevideo (N)	Peru	0–0	1942 South American Championship		70,000	
68	14 January 1945	Estadio Nacional, Santiago (N)	Ecuador	6–3	1945 South American Championship	Alcántara (3), Vera, F. Hormazábal, Clavero	65,000	
69	24 January 1945	Estadio Nacional, Santiago (N)	Bolivia	5–0	1945 South American Championship	Clavero (3), Alcántara (2)	70,000	
70	31 January 1945	Estadio Nacional, Santiago (N)	Colombia	2–0	1945 South American Championship	Medina, Piñeiro	60,000	
71	11 February 1945	Estadio Nacional, Santiago (N)	Argentina	1–1	1945 South American Championship	Medina	70,000	
72	18 February 1945	Estadio Nacional, Santiago (N)	Uruguay	1–0	1945 South American Championship	Medina	65,000	
73	28 February 1945	Estadio Nacional, Santiago (N)	Brazil	0–1	1945 South American Championship		80,000	
74	16 January 1946	Estadio Gasómetro, Buenos Aires (N)	Uruguay	0–1	1946 South American Championship		50,000	
75	19 January 1946	Estadio Gasómetro, Buenos Aires (N)	Paraguay	2–1	1946 South American Championship	Araya, Cremaschi	60,000	
76	26 January 1946	Estadio Monumental, Buenos Aires (N)	Argentina	1–3	1946 South American Championship	Alcántara	80,000	
77	3 February 1946	Estadio Gasómetro, Buenos Aires (N)	Brazil	1–5	1946 South American Championship	Salfate	22,000	
78	8 February 1946	Estadio Gasómetro, Buenos Aires (N)	Bolivia	4–1	1946 South American Championship	Araya (2), Cremaschi (2)	18,000	
79	6 December 1947	Estadio George Capwell, Guayaquil (N)	Uruguay	0–6	1947 South American Championship		20,000	
80	9 December 1947	Estadio George Capwell, Guayaquil (N)	Peru	2–1	1947 South American Championship	Valera, Busquets	15,000	
81	11 December 1947	Estadio George Capwell, Guayaquil (N)	Ecuador	3–0	1947 South American Championship	Peñaloza, López (2)	22,000	
82	16 December 1947	Estadio George Capwell, Guayaquil (N)	Argentina	1–1	1947 South American Championship	Riera	30,000	
83	23 December 1947	Estadio George Capwell, Guayaquil (N)	Paraguay	0–1	1947 South American Championship		5,000	
84	27 December 1947	Estadio George Capwell, Guayaquil (N)	Colombia	4–1	1947 South American Championship	Prieto, Sáez (2), Riera	5,000	
85	30 December 1947	Estadio George Capwell, Guayaquil (N)	Bolivia	4–3	1947 South American Championship	Aráoz (o.g.), Sáez, Infante, López	5,000	
86	6 April 1949	Pacaembu Stadium, São Paulo (N)	Bolivia	2–3	1949 South American Championship	Riera, Salamanca	30,000	
87	13 April 1949	Pacaembu Stadium, São Paulo (N)	Brazil	1–2	1949 South American Championship	López	45,000	
88	17 April 1949	Estádio São Januário, Rio de Janeiro (N)	Ecuador	1–0	1949 South American Championship	Rojas	8,000	
89	20 April 1949	Estádio São Januário, Rio de Janeiro (N)	Colombia	1–1	1949 South American Championship	López	7,000	
90	27 April 1949	Pacaembu Stadium, São Paulo (N)	Paraguay	2–4	1949 South American Championship	Cremaschi, Ramos	1,000	
91	30 April 1949	Pacaembu Stadium, São Paulo (N)	Peru	0–3	1949 South American Championship		1,000	
92	8 May 1949	Estádio América, Belo Horizonte (N)	Uruguay	3–1	1949 South American Championship	Infante (2), Cremaschi	5,000	
93	26 February 1950	Estadio Hernando Siles, La Paz (A)	Bolivia	0–2	1950 FIFA World Cup qualification		—	
94	12 March 1950	Santiago (H)	Bolivia	5–0	Friendly	Infante (3), Díaz Zambrano, Cremaschi	—	
95	7 April 1950	Santiago (H)	Uruguay	1–5	Friendly	Díaz Zambrano	—	
96	9 April 1950	Santiago (H)	Uruguay	2–1	Friendly	Infante, Cremaschi	—	
97	25 June 1950	Maracanã Stadium, Rio de Janeiro (N)	England	0–2	1950 FIFA World Cup		29,703	
98	29 June 1950	Maracanã Stadium, Rio de Janeiro (N)	Spain	0–2	1950 FIFA World Cup		19,790	
99	2 July 1950	Estádio Ilha do Retiro, Recife (N)	United States	5–2	1950 FIFA World Cup	Robledo, Cremaschi (2), Prieto, Riera	8,501	
100	16 March 1952	Estadio Nacional, Santiago (N)	Panama	6–1	1952 Panamerican Championship	E. Hormazábal, Prieto (3), M. Muñoz, Meléndez	—	
101	26 March 1952	Estadio Nacional, Santiago (N)	Mexico	4–0	1952 Panamerican Championship	E. Hormazábal, Prieto (2), Díaz Carmona	—	
102	2 April 1952	Estadio Nacional, Santiago (N)	Peru	3–2	1952 Panamerican Championship	Prieto, Meléndez, Cremaschi	—	
103	13 April 1952	Estadio Nacional, Santiago (N)	Uruguay	2–0	1952 Panamerican Championship	Cremaschi, M. Muñoz	—	
104	20 April 1952	Estadio Nacional, Santiago (N)	Brazil	0–3	1952 Panamerican Championship		—	
105	25 February 1953	Estadio Nacional, Lima (N)	Paraguay	0–3	1953 South American Championship		45,000	
106	1 March 1953	Estadio Nacional, Lima (N)	Uruguay	3–2	1953 South American Championship	Molina (3)	45,000	
107	4 March 1953	Estadio Nacional, Lima (N)	Peru	0–0	1953 South American Championship		45,000	
108	19 March 1953	Estadio Nacional, Lima (N)	Ecuador	3–0	1953 South American Championship	Molina (2), Cremaschi	55,000	
109	23 March 1953	Estadio Nacional, Lima (N)	Brazil	2–3	1953 South American Championship	Molina (2)	35,000	
110	28 March 1953	Estadio Nacional, Lima (N)	Bolivia	2–2	1953 South American Championship	Meléndez, Díaz Carmona	45,000	
111	24 May 1953	Estadio Nacional, Santiago (H)	England	1–2	Friendly	Díaz Zambrano	70,000	
112	12 June 1953	Estadio Nacional, Santiago (H)	Spain	1–2	Friendly	M. Muñoz	—	
113	26 July 1953	Estadio Nacional, Lima (A)	Peru	2–1	Copa del Pacífico	E. Hormazábal, Robledo	—	
114	28 July 1953	Estadio Nacional, Lima (A)	Peru	0–5	Copa del Pacífico		—	
115	14 February 1954	Asunción (A)	Paraguay	0–4	1954 FIFA World Cup qualification		—	
116	21 February 1954	Estadio Nacional, Santiago (H)	Paraguay	1–3	1954 FIFA World Cup qualification	Robledo	—	
117	28 February 1954	Estadio Nacional, Santiago (H)	Brazil	0–2	1954 FIFA World Cup qualification		—	
118	14 March 1954	Maracanã Stadium, Rio de Janeiro (A)	Brazil	0–1	1954 FIFA World Cup qualification		—	
119	17 September 1954	Santiago (H)	Peru	2–1	Copa del Pacífico	Meléndez, Russo	—	
120	19 September 1954	Santiago (H)	Peru	2–4	Copa del Pacífico	Meléndez (2)	—	
121	27 February 1955	Estadio Nacional, Santiago (N)	Ecuador	7–1	1955 South American Championship	E. Hormazábal (3), Díaz Zambrano (2), Meléndez, Robledo	40,000	
122	6 March 1955	Estadio Nacional, Santiago (N)	Peru	5–4	1955 South American Championship	M. Muñoz, Robledo (2), E. Hormazábal, J. Ramírez	50,000	
123	13 March 1955	Estadio Nacional, Santiago (N)	Uruguay	2–2	1955 South American Championship	M. Muñoz, E. Hormazábal	50,000	
124	20 March 1955	Estadio Nacional, Santiago (N)	Paraguay	5–0	1955 South American Championship	Meléndez (2), M. Muñoz (2), E. Hormazábal	55,000	
125	30 March 1955	Estadio Nacional, Santiago (N)	Argentina	0–1	1955 South American Championship		65,000	
126	18 September 1955	Maracanã Stadium, Rio de Janeiro (A)	Brazil	1–1	Copa Bernardo O'Higgins	J. Ramírez	—	
127	20 September 1955	Pacaembu Stadium, São Paulo (A)	Brazil	1–2	Copa Bernardo O'Higgins	E. Hormazábal	—	
128	24 January 1956	Estadio Centenario, Montevideo (N)	Brazil	4–1	1956 South American Championship	E. Hormazábal (2), Meléndez, Sánchez	18,000	
129	29 January 1956	Estadio Centenario, Montevideo (N)	Argentina	0–2	1956 South American Championship		45,000	
130	6 February 1956	Estadio Centenario, Montevideo (N)	Uruguay	1–2	1956 South American Championship	J. Ramírez	60,000	
131	9 February 1956	Estadio Centenario, Montevideo (N)	Peru	4–3	1956 South American Championship	E. Hormazábal, M. Muñoz, Fernández, Sánchez	5,000	
132	12 February 1956	Estadio Centenario, Montevideo (N)	Paraguay	2–0	1956 South American Championship	E. Hormazábal, J. Ramírez	4,000	
133	1 March 1956	Estadio Olímpico Universitario, Mexico City (N)	Brazil	1–2	1956 Panamerican Championship	Tello	14,000	
134	8 March 1956	Estadio Olímpico Universitario, Mexico City (N)	Costa Rica	1–2	1956 Panamerican Championship	E. Hormazábal	80,000	
135	11 March 1956	Estadio Olímpico Universitario, Mexico City (N)	Argentina	0–3	1956 Panamerican Championship		—	
136	15 March 1956	Estadio Olímpico Universitario, Mexico City (N)	Peru	2–2	1956 Panamerican Championship	Díaz Zambrano, Cortés	—	
137	17 March 1956	Estadio Olímpico Universitario, Mexico City (N)	Mexico	1–2	1956 Panamerican Championship	Tello	80,000	
138	26 August 1956	Estadio Nacional, Santiago (H)	Czechoslovakia	3–0	Friendly	E. Hormazábal, Robledo (2)	50,000	
139	13 March 1957	Estadio Nacional, Lima (N)	Brazil	2–4	1957 South American Championship	J. Ramírez, Fernández	42,000	
140	16 March 1957	Estadio Nacional, Lima (N)	Peru	0–1	1957 South American Championship		60,000	
141	21 March 1957	Estadio Nacional, Lima (N)	Colombia	3–2	1957 South American Championship	Verdejo (2), Espinoza	45,000	
142	24 March 1957	Estadio Nacional, Lima (N)	Ecuador	2–2	1957 South American Championship	J. Ramírez (2)	45,000	
143	28 March 1957	Estadio Nacional, Lima (N)	Argentina	2–6	1957 South American Championship	Fernández (2)	50,000	
144	1 April 1957	Estadio Nacional, Lima (N)	Uruguay	0–2	1957 South American Championship		40,000	
145	15 September 1957	Estadio Nacional, Santiago (H)	Brazil	1–0	Copa Bernardo O'Higgins	Meléndez	—	
146	18 September 1957	Estadio Nacional, Santiago (H)	Brazil	1–1 (a.e.t.)	Copa Bernardo O'Higgins	Fernández	—	
147	22 September 1957	Santiago (H)	Bolivia	2–1	1958 FIFA World Cup qualification	Díaz Zambrano, J. Ramírez	—	
148	29 September 1957	Estadio Hernando Siles, La Paz (A)	Bolivia	0–3	1958 FIFA World Cup qualification		—	
149	13 October 1957	Estadio Nacional, Santiago (H)	Argentina	0–2	1958 FIFA World Cup qualification		—	
150	20 October 1957	Boca Juniors Stadium, Buenos Aires (A)	Argentina	0–4	1958 FIFA World Cup qualification		—	
151	7 March 1959	Estadio Monumental, Buenos Aires (N)	Argentina	1–6	First 1959 South American Championship	Álverez	70,000	
152	11 March 1959	Estadio Monumental, Buenos Aires (N)	Paraguay	1–2	First 1959 South American Championship	Sánchez	45,000	
153	15 March 1959	Estadio Monumental, Buenos Aires (N)	Brazil	0–3	First 1959 South American Championship		40,000	
154	21 March 1959	Estadio Monumental, Buenos Aires (N)	Peru	1–1	First 1959 South American Championship	Tovar	50,000	
155	26 March 1959	Estadio Monumental, Buenos Aires (N)	Bolivia	5–2	First 1959 South American Championship	M. Soto (2), J. Soto (2), Sánchez	70,000	
156	2 April 1959	Estadio Monumental, Buenos Aires (N)	Uruguay	1–0	First 1959 South American Championship	M. Moreno	5,000	
157	17 September 1959	Maracanã Stadium, Rio de Janeiro (A)	Brazil	0–7	Copa Bernardo O'Higgins		—	
158	20 September 1959	Pacaembu Stadium, São Paulo (A)	Brazil	0–1	Copa Bernardo O'Higgins		—	
159	18 November 1959	Estadio Nacional, Santiago (H)	Argentina	4–2	Friendly	Ríos, Bello (2), Sánchez	—	

Notes

1. A: The Argentina vs. Chile match at the 1942 South American Championships was abandoned after 42 minutes when the Chilean players left the field in protest at the referee's performance. The match was subsequently awarded to Argentina.
2. B: Originally played as a qualification match for the 1950 FIFA World Cup before Argentina withdrew. As a result of Argentina's withdrawal, both Bolivia and Chile qualified automatically and FIFA do not consider this match as an official qualification match.
3. C: Originally scheduled as a qualification match for the 1950 FIFA World Cup but later played as a friendly after both teams qualified automatically.
4. D: Suspended after 66 minutes, the match was awarded to Chile following unsportsmanlike behaviour from the Bolivian team.
5. E: The Uruguay vs. Chile match at the 1957 South American Championships was abandoned after 43 minutes following a pitch invasion by spectators. The score at the time of the abandonment was taken as the final result.

== Record by opponent ==
Team	Pld	W	D	L	GF	GA	GD	WPCT
Argentina	34	1	5	28	26	90	−64	2.94
Bolivia	11	8	0	3	36	18	+18	72.73
Brazil	24	2	4	18	22	65	−43	8.33
Colombia	4	3	1	0	10	4	+6	75.00
Costa Rica	1	0	0	1	1	2	−1	0.00
Czechoslovakia	1	1	0	0	3	0	+3	100.00
Ecuador	9	8	1	0	33	8	+25	88.89
England	2	0	0	2	1	4	−3	0.00
France	1	1	0	0	1	0	+1	100.00
Netherlands	1	0	1	0	2	2	0	0.00
Mexico	4	3	0	1	11	3	+8	75.00
Panama	1	1	0	0	6	1	+5	100.00
Paraguay	16	5	0	11	26	36	−10	31.25
Peru	18	7	5	6	27	34	−7	38.89
Portugal	1	0	0	1	2	4	−2	0.00
Spain	2	0	0	2	1	4	−3	0.00
United States	1	1	0	0	5	2	+3	100.00
Uruguay	28	7	1	20	30	70	−40	25.00
Total	159	48	18	93	243	347	−104	30.19

Source: Results
