= Unamuno (disambiguation) =

Unamuno often refers to Miguel de Unamuno (1864–1936), Spanish essayist, novelist, and poet.

Unamuno may also refer to:

- Pedro de Unamuno (fl. 1580s), Spanish soldier and sailor
- Ramón Unamuno (1907—1973), Ecuadorian footballer and coach
- Rebecca De Unamuno, Australian actress and comedian
- Victorio Unamuno (1909–1988), Spanish footballer
