= 1938 Ligas Provinciales de Lima y Callao =

Ligas Provinciales de Lima y Callao
- Season: 1938
- Dates: 1938 – 28 May 1939
- Champions: Atlético Córdoba
- Relegated: Atlético Peruano; Sport Progreso; Porteño; Unión Buenos Aires

The 1938 Ligas Provinciales de Lima y Callao, the second division of Peruvian football (soccer), was played by 19 teams (11 from the Liga Provincial de Lima and eight from the Liga Provincial del Callao). The tournament winner, Atlético Córdoba was promoted to the 1939 Peruvian Primera División.

From 1931 until 1942 the points system was W:3, D:2, L:1, walkover:0.

By the end of 1937, Centro Iqueño was playing in the Segunda División Provincial de Lima. That year, in the División de Honor (the top tier of football at the time), Sportivo Tarapacá Ferrocarril was relegated. The club’s officials agreed to merge with Iqueño and transfer to it the division spot they held in the Liga Provincial de Lima (which was the second most important category).

== Teams ==
=== Team changes ===
Relegated from 1937 Primera División	Promoted to 1938 Primera División	Promoted from 1937 División Intermedia (Lima)	Promoted from 1937 División Intermedia (Callao)	Relegated from 1937 Liga Provincial de Lima	Relegated from 1937 Liga Provincial del Callao
▼ Telmo Carbajo (8th) ▼ Sportivo Melgar (9th) ▼ Sportivo Tarapacá Ferrocarril (10th)	▲ Ciclista Lima (1st - Lima) ▲ Progresista Apurímac (1st - Callao)	▲ Atlético Lusitania (1st)	▲ Sportivo Palermo (1st)	▼ Alianza Cóndor (9th) ▼ Sport Inca (10th)	▼ Atlético Excelsior (8th)

=== Stadia and Locations ===
Team	City
Atlético Córdoba	Barrios Altos, Lima
Atlético Lusitania	Barrios Altos, Lima
Atlético Peruano	Rímac, Lima
Centro Iqueño	Cercado de Lima
Independencia Miraflores	Miraflores, Lima
Jorge Chávez	Callao
Juventud Gloria	Cercado de Lima
Miguel Grau	Rímac, Lima
Porteño	Callao
Santiago Barranco	Barranco, Lima
Social San Carlos	Callao
Sport Progreso	Rímac, Lima
Sporting Palermo	Callao
Sportivo Melgar	Barrios Altos, Lima
Telmo Carbajo	Callao
Unión Buenos Aires	Callao
Unión Carbone	Barrios Altos, Lima
Unión Estrella	Callao
White Star	Callao

== Liga Provincial de Lima ==
=== Primeros Equipos ===
Pos	Team	Pld	W	D	L	GF	GA	GD	Pts
1	Atlético Córdoba	10	7	2	1	25	9	+16	26
2	Centro Iqueño	10	6	2	2	20	13	+7	24
3	Unión Carbone	10	5	4	1	15	9	+6	24
4	Santiago Barranco	10	6	1	3	26	20	+6	23
5	Atlético Lusitania	10	4	3	3	19	17	+2	21
6	Juventud Gloria	10	4	1	5	19	19	0	19
7	Independencia Miraflores	10	3	2	5	21	23	−2	18
8	Miguel Grau	10	4	1	5	16	18	−2	18
9	Sportivo Melgar	10	2	2	6	20	26	−6	16
10	Sport Progreso	10	1	3	6	9	22	−13	15
11	Atlético Peruano	10	1	3	6	7	21	−14	15

==== Results ====
Teams play each other once, either home or away. The matches were played only in Lima.

Home \ Away	COR	LUS	PER	CEN	IND	GLO	GRA	SAN	PRO	MEL	CAR
Atlético Córdoba			6–0			2–1	W.O.	3–2			0–0
Atlético Lusitania	1–0				5–1			2–5	1–1		2–2
Atlético Peruano		1–2		1–0		1–4	0–0		0–0		
Centro Iqueño	1–1	1–2			4–1		2–0	3–3	2–1		
Independencia Miraflores	4–5		1–0					4–0		6–2	1–1
Juventud Gloria		2–1		1–2	2–2				2–1	3–4	
Miguel Grau		3–2			3–1	2–3		1–3		2–1	2–3
Santiago Barranco			3–1			3–1				3–2	
Sport Progreso	0–5				1–0		1–3	1–3			1–1
Sportivo Melgar	0–1	1–1	2–2	3–4					5–2		
Unión Carbone			3–1	0–1		1–0		2–1		2–0	

Updated to match(es) played on unknown. Source: Diario El Comercio, La Prensa and Crónica.
Legend: Blue = home team win; Yellow = draw; Red = away team win.

=== Tabla Absoluta ===
Pos	Team	Pld	W	D	L	GF	GA	GD	Pts	Resv.	Total	Qualification or relegation
1	Atlético Córdoba	10	7	2	1	25	9	+16	26	1.75	27.75	Qualified to the Promotion Play-off
2	Centro Iqueño	10	6	2	2	20	13	+7	24	2.625	26.625	
3	Unión Carbone	10	5	4	1	15	9	+6	24	2.375	26.375	
4	Santiago Barranco	10	6	1	3	26	20	+6	23	1.75	24.75	
5	Atlético Lusitania	10	4	3	3	19	17	+2	21	3.625	24.625	
6	Juventud Gloria	10	4	1	5	19	19	0	19	3.375	22.375	
7	Miguel Grau	10	4	1	5	16	18	−2	18	3.375	21.375	
8	Sportivo Melgar	10	2	2	6	20	26	−6	16	4.125	20.125	
9	Independencia Miraflores	10	3	2	5	21	23	−2	18	1.75	19.75	
10	Atlético Peruano	10	1	3	6	7	21	−14	15	2.75	17.75	1939 División Intermedia
11	Sport Progreso	10	3	1	6	9	22	−13	15	0.75	15.75	1939 División Intermedia

== Liga Provincial del Callao ==
=== Primeros Equipos ===
Pos	Team	Pld	W	D	L	GF	GA	GD	Pts
1	Jorge Chávez	7	5	0	2	22	8	+14	17
2	Telmo Carbajo	7	4	2	1	15	10	+5	17
3	Social San Carlos	7	4	1	2	16	10	+6	16
4	Unión Estrella	7	3	1	3	11	10	+1	14
5	Sporting Palermo	7	3	1	3	11	14	−3	14
6	White Star	7	2	2	3	14	18	−4	13
7	Porteño	7	2	1	4	10	17	−7	12
8	Unión Buenos Aires	7	0	2	5	9	21	−12	9

==== Results ====
Teams play each other once, either home or away. The matches were played only in Callao.

Home \ Away	JCH	POR	CAR	PAL	TEL	UBA	UES	WHI
Jorge Chávez				6–1	0–2	4–0		4–0
Porteño	4–3		1–4	2–0			1–3	
Social San Carlos	0–3					4–0		2–2
Sportivo Palermo			1–3		2–1	1–1		2–3
Telmo Carbajo		0–0	2–1			4–2	1–1	
Unión Buenos Aires		3–4					1–2	1–1
Unión Estrella	1–2		1–2	0–2				
White Star		2–0			4–5		1–3	

Updated to match(es) played on 1939. Source: Diario El Comercio, La Prensa and Crónica.
Legend: Blue = home team win; Yellow = draw; Red = away team win.

=== Tabla Absoluta ===
Pos	Team	Pld	W	D	L	GF	GA	GD	Pts	Resv.	Total	Qualification or relegation
1	Telmo Carbajo	7	4	2	1	15	10	+5	17	2.875	19.875	Qualified to the Promotion Play-off
2	Jorge Chávez	7	5	0	2	22	8	+14	17	2.5	19.5	
3	Social San Carlos	7	4	1	2	16	10	+6	16	1.5	17.5	
4	Sportivo Palermo	7	3	1	3	11	14	−3	14	2	16	
5	Unión Estrella	7	3	1	3	11	10	+1	14	1.875	15.875	
6	White Star	7	2	2	3	14	18	−4	13	1.125	14.125	
7	Porteño	7	2	1	4	10	17	−7	12	1.875	13.875	1939 División Intermedia
8	Unión Buenos Aires	7	0	2	5	9	21	−12	9	0.875	9.875	1939 División Intermedia

== Promotion Play-off ==
28 May 1939

Atlético Córdoba	1–0	Telmo Carbajo

Estadio Nacional

== See also ==
- 1938 Peruvian Primera División
