= Arturo Paredes =

Peruvian footballer (born 1913)

Personal information
- Full name: Arturo Félix Emilio Paredes Álvarez
- Date of birth: 6 October 1913
- Place of birth: Callao, Peru
- Date of death: ?
- Position: Forward

Senior career*
Years	Team	Apps	(Gls)
1930–1932	Telmo Carbajo		
1933–1935	Atlético Chalaco		
1936–1939	Sport Boys		
1940–1943	Atlético Chalaco		

International career
1937–1939	Peru	9	(1)
Medal record
Men's football
Representing Peru
Bolivarian Games
Gold medal – first place	1938 Bogotá
Copa América
Winner	1939 Lima
- * Club domestic league appearances and goals

Arturo Félix Emilio Paredes Álvarez (6 October 1913 – ?) was a Peruvian professional footballer who played as forward.

== Playing career ==
Paredes played exclusively for clubs in Callao (Telmo Carbajo, Sport Boys and Atlético Chalaco). He won the First Division championship in 1937 with Sport Boys.

With the Peruvian national team, Paredes played nine matches (scoring one goal) between 1937 and 1939. He was selected for the South American Championships in 1937 and 1939, winning the competition in 1939. He also participated in the 1936 Berlin Olympics (though he did not play a match).

== Honours ==
Sport Boys

- Peruvian Primera División: 1937

Peru

- South American Championship: 1939
- Bolivarian Games: 1938
