= Alfonso Suárez Rizzo =

Ecuadorian footballer (born 1913)

Personal information
- Date of birth: 24 June 1913 (age 113)
- Place of birth: Guayaquil, Ecuador
- Position: Forward

Senior career*
Years	Team	Apps	(Gls)
1932–????	Liga Deportiva Estudiantil		
1934–1938	Panamá		
1937	→ Independiente Rivadavia (loan)		
1939	Hispano América		
1940	Millonarios		
1941	Santiago Wanderers		
1942–1943	Green Cross		

International career
1938–1941	Ecuador	12	(2)

Managerial career
- 1951: Barcelona SC
- 1956: Barcelona SC
- * Club domestic league appearances and goals

Alfonso Suárez Rizzo (born 24 June 1913) is an Ecuadorian former footballer who played as a forward. He is considered one of the best Ecuadorian footballers of all time.

== Career ==
Suárez made his debut in January 1932 for Liga Deportiva Estudiantil, in a match against Chilean side Esparta de Tocopilla. In 1937, he and Ernesto Cevallos were approached by the president of Argentine club Independiente Rivadavia, who offered them at the club for an exhibition tour of Central America, the Caribbean, and Mexico. Two years later, following the South American Championship in 1939, Suárez and Marino Alcívar, who had scored the Ecuador national team's first two goals, were offered a place at newly-promoted Cuban side Hispano América by Spaniard Néstor Azúa.

In early 1940, Millonarios were preparing to face Club Atlético Atlanta, the first Argentine team to ever visit Colombia. The club's directors asked Suárez's international teammate Eloy Ronquillo to contact him in order to reinforce their side. Suárez accepted, but due to communication issues, it took him 20 days to arrive in Bogotá, where he spent four days training under former Colombian national team manager Fernando Paternoster. On 28 January 1940, the match was played between Millonarios and Atlanta was played, with Millonarios winning.

Internationally, Suárez played 12 matches for the Ecuador between 1938 and 1941, including at the 1938 Bolivarian Games, and both the 1939 and 1941 South American Championships. He scored two international goals, both at the Bolivarian Games, with one each in a 9–1 defeat to Peru and a 5–2 win against Venezuela.

== Personal life ==
Suárez's brothers Porfirio and Humberto were both footballers, with Humberto winning several titles at Ecuadorian side Emelec.
