= Juan Quispe =

Peruvian footballer (1914–1996)

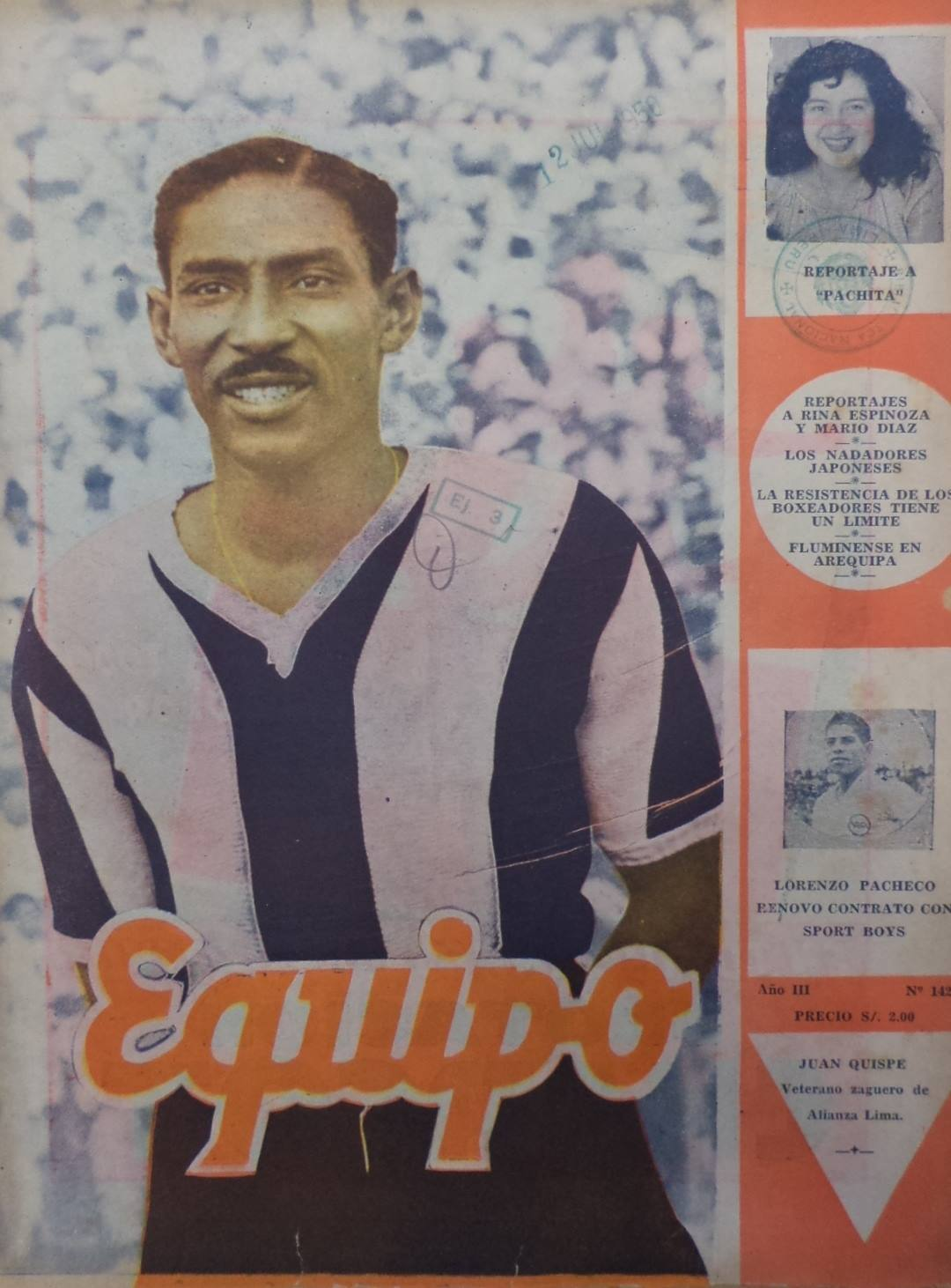

Personal information
- Full name: Juan Quispe Vila
- Date of birth: 3 October 1914
- Place of birth: Lima, Peru
- Date of death: 1996
- Height: 1.82 m (6 ft 0 in)
- Position: Defender

Senior career*
Years	Team	Apps	(Gls)
1936–1950	Alianza Lima	182	(?)

International career
1939–1942	Peru	13	(0)
Medal record
Men's football
Representing Peru
Bolivarian Games
Gold medal – first place	1938 Bogotá
Copa América
Winner	1939 Lima
- * Club domestic league appearances and goals

Juan Quispe Vila (3 October 1914 – 1996) was a Peruvian professional footballer who played as defender.

== Playing career ==
Nicknamed La Víbora (the Viper), Juan Quispe played for Alianza Lima from 1936 to 1950 (182 matches). He was part of the Alianza team that was promoted back to the first division in 1939, before winning the Peruvian championship in 1948.

A Peruvian international, he earned 13 caps between 1939 and 1942. He was part of the South American championship-winning team in 1939, and also participated in the South American championships of 1941 and 1942.

== Honours ==
Alianza Lima

- Peruvian Primera División: 1948
- Ligas Provinciales de Lima y Callao: 1939

Peru

- South American Championship: 1939
- Bolivarian Games: 1938
