= Raúl Muñoz =

Raúl Muñoz can refer to:

- Raúl Muñoz (athlete)
- Raúl Muñoz (footballer, born 1919)
- Raúl Muñoz (footballer, born 1975)
