= Pedro Ibáñez (footballer, born 1912) =

Peruvian footballer (born 1912)

Personal information
- Full name: Pedro Ibáñez Rivas
- Date of birth: 29 May 1912
- Place of birth: Callao, Peru
- Date of death: ?
- Position: Forward

Senior career*
Years	Team	Apps	(Gls)
1931–1932	Unión Buenos Aires		
1933–1935	Barrio Frigorífico		
1936–1943	Sport Boys		

International career
1937–1939	Peru	6	(2)
Medal record
Men's football
Representing Peru
Bolivarian Games
Gold medal – first place	1938 Bogotá
Copa América
Winner	1939 Lima
- * Club domestic league appearances and goals

Pedro Ibáñez Rivas (29 May 1912 – ?) was a Peruvian professional footballer who played as forward.

== Playing career ==
Pedro Ibáñez played for Sport Boys, a club where he won the Peruvian championship twice, in 1937 and 1942.

A Peruvian international, Pedro Ibáñez was part of the team competing in the 1936 Berlin Olympics, although he did not play any matches during the tournament. He made his debut for the national team at the 1937 South American Championship held in Buenos Aires. The following year, he won the Bolivarian Games in Bogotá, a tournament in which he scored two goals against Colombia on 8 August 1938 (a 4–2 victory). Finally, he won the South American Championship with Peru at the 1939 South American Championship held in Lima.

== Honours ==
Sport Boys

- Peruvian Primera División (2): 1937, 1942

Peru

- South American Championship: 1939
- Bolivarian Games: 1938
