= 1938 Peruvian Primera División =

Peruvian Primera División
- Season: 1938
- Dates: 25 September 1938 – 20 November 1938
- Champions: Deportivo Municipal (1st title)
- Runner up: Sport Boys
- Relegated: Alianza Lima; Progresista Apurímac
- Matches: 37
- Goals: 133 (3.59 per match)
- Top goalscorer: Jorge Alcalde (8 goals)

The 1938 season of the Peruvian Primera División, the top category of Peruvian football, was played by 9 teams. The national champions were Deportivo Municipal. Because Alianza Lima and Sucre tied on points a relegation playoff took place. From 1931 until 1942 the points system was W:3, D:2, L:1, walkover:0.

The whole tournament was played in two stadiums:

Stadium	City
National Stadium	Lima
Estadio Modelo de Bellavista	Callao

== Teams ==
=== Team changes ===
Promoted from 1937 Liga Provincial de Lima	Promoted from 1937 Liga Provincial del Callao	Relegated from 1937 Primera División
▲ Ciclista Lima (1st)	▲ Progresista Apurímac (1st)	▼ Telmo Carbajo (8th) ▼ Sportivo Melgar (9th) ▼ Sportivo Tarapacá Ferrocarril (10th)

=== Stadia and Locations ===
Team	City
Alianza Lima	La Victoria, Lima
Atlético Chalaco	Callao
Ciclista Lima	Cercado de Lima
Deportivo Municipal	Cercado de Lima
Progresista Apurímac	Callao
Sport Boys	Callao
Sporting Tabaco	Rímac, Lima
Sucre	La Victoria, Lima
Universitario	Cercado de Lima

== League table ==
=== Standings ===
Pos	Team	Pld	W	D	L	GF	GA	GD	Pts	Qualification or relegation
1	Deportivo Municipal (C)	8	7	0	1	21	9	+12	22	Champions
2	Sport Boys	8	4	1	3	22	16	+6	17	
3	Universitario	8	4	1	3	9	8	+1	17	
4	Sporting Tabaco	8	2	4	2	16	12	+4	16	
5	Atlético Chalaco	8	3	2	3	10	10	0	16	
6	Ciclista Lima	8	3	1	4	13	17	−4	15	
7	Alianza Lima	8	2	2	4	15	18	−3	14	Relegation play-off
8	Sucre (O)	8	3	0	5	16	22	−6	14	Relegation play-off
9	Progresista Apurímac (R)	8	2	1	5	9	19	−10	13	1939 Ligas Provinciales de Lima y Callao

(C) Champions; (O) Play-off winners; (R) Relegated

== Results ==
Teams play each other once, either home or away. All matches were played in Lima.

Home \ Away	ALI	CHA	CIC	MUN	PRO	SBA	TAB	SUC	UNI
Alianza Lima				1–3	1–3	3–1			1–2
Atlético Chalaco	1–1			1–2			1–0	3–1	1–0
Ciclista Lima	1–3	2–1			2–1				
Deportivo Municipal			2–1		5–0	3–0	3–2		1–0
Progresista Apurímac		0–0					1–4	2–3	1–0
Sport Boys		4–2	6–3		4–1				
Sporting Tabaco	3–3		1–1			1–1		3–0	
Sucre	4–2		2–3	4–2		1–5			
Universitario			1–0			2–1	2–2	2–1	

Updated to match(es) played on 1938. Source: Diario El Comercio, La Prensa and Crónica.
Legend: Blue = home team win; Yellow = draw; Red = away team win.

== Relegation play-off ==
27 November 1938	Sucre	2–0	Alianza Lima	Estadio Nacional, Lima
15:50	Eduardo Lazo 20'; Luis Tejada 35'			Referee: Enrique Cuenca

Sucre remain in the Primera División.

== See also ==
- 1938 Ligas Provinciales de Lima y Callao
