= Alberto Baldovino =

Peruvian footballer (1917–1997)

Personal information
- Full name: Alberto Baldovino La Rosa
- Date of birth: 13 April 1917
- Place of birth: Callao, Peru
- Date of death: 23 May 1997 (aged 80)
- Position: Forward

Senior career*
Years	Team	Apps	(Gls)
1933–1934	Alianza Frigorífico		
1935	Sport Boys		
1937–1938	Universitario		
1939–1945	Sport Boys		
1946–1947	Deportivo Español		
1948–1949	C.D. Veracruz		
1949–?	Escuela Militar		
?–1952	Litoral S.C.		

International career
1939	Peru		
Medal record
Men's football
Representing Peru
Copa América
Winner	1939 Lima
- * Club domestic league appearances and goals

Alberto Baldovino La Rosa (13 April 1917 – 23 May 1997) was a Peruvian professional footballer who played as forward.

== Playing career ==
Alberto Baldovino began his career very young, at 15, in the ranks of the Alianza Frigorífico of the Callao league, hence his nickname El Pibe (the kid), which would stay with him throughout his life. In 1935, he joined Sport Boys and became Peruvian champion the same year. After a stint at Universitario de Deportes between 1936 and 1938, he returned to Sport Boys and played there until 1945, winning his second Peruvian championship in 1942.

Between 1946 and 1952, he emigrated to play in Venezuela for Deportivo Español, followed by a spell in Mexico with C.D. Veracruz between 1948 and 1949. It was at this last club that he reunited with his compatriots Rufino Lecca, Leopoldo Quiñónez and Grimaldo González. He continued his career in Venezuela until 1952.

Even though Baldovino never played a match with the Peruvian national team, he was part of the squad that won the South American championship in 1939.

== Honours ==
Sport Boys

- Peruvian Primera División (2): 1935, 1942

Peru

- South American Championship: 1939
