= Víctor Bielich =

Peruvian footballer (1916–1940)

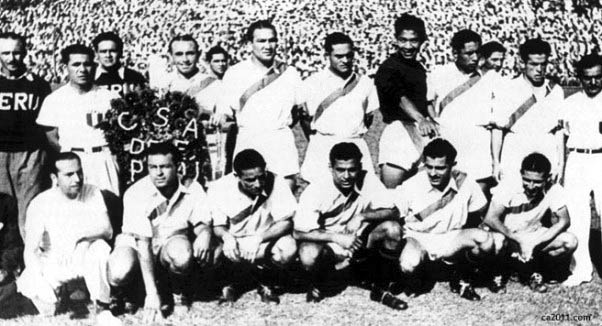
- Bielich (4th crouching) and the Peruvian team in 1939.

Personal information
- Full name: Víctor Bielich Rocatagliatta
- Date of birth: 7 August 1916
- Place of birth: Lima, Peru
- Date of death: 13 March 1940 (aged 23)
- Place of death: Pisco, Peru
- Position: Forward

Senior career*
Years	Team	Apps	(Gls)
1936–1937	Universitario		
1938–1940	Deportivo Municipal		

International career
1938–1939	Peru	5	(4)
Medal record
Men's football
Representing Peru
Bolivarian Games
Gold medal – first place	1938 Bogotá
Copa América
Winner	1939 Lima
- * Club domestic league appearances and goals

Víctor Bielich Rocatagliatta (7 August 1916 – 13 March 1940) was a Peruvian professional footballer who played as forward.

== Playing career ==
Nicknamed Pichín, Víctor Bielich played for Universitario de Deportes between 1936 and 1937. But it was at Deportivo Municipal that he made a name for himself, winning the Peruvian championship in 1938. He is considered one of the great players of this latter club.

A Peruvian international five times between 1938 and 1939 (scoring four goals), Bielich was part of the Peruvian team that won the South American championship in 1939.

== Death ==
On March 9, 1940, returning from Chincha Alta where the Deportivo Municipal officials had sent him to recruit a local player (José Montero), Víctor Bielich's car collided with a truck on National Highway PE-1S. Montero died instantly in the accident. Bielich himself died four days later at the San Juan de Dios Hospital in Pisco.

As a tribute, a football club in Pisco, Club Deportivo Víctor Bielich, bears his name.

== Honours ==
Deportivo Municipal

- Peruvian Primera División: 1938

Peru

- South American Championship: 1939
- Bolivarian Games: 1938
