= Augusto Lobos =

Chilean footballer (1912-1996)

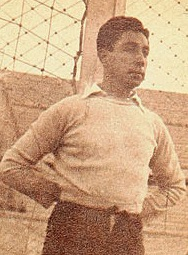

Personal information
- Date of birth: 10 July 1912
- Date of death: 19 April 1996 (aged 83)
- Position: Goalkeeper

International career
Years	Team	Apps	(Gls)
1939	Chile	3	(0)

Augusto Lobos (10 July 1912 – 19 April 1996) was a Chilean footballer. He played in three matches for the Chile national football team in 1939. He was also part of Chile's squad for the 1939 South American Championship.
