= Humberto Roa =

Chilean footballer (1912–1986)

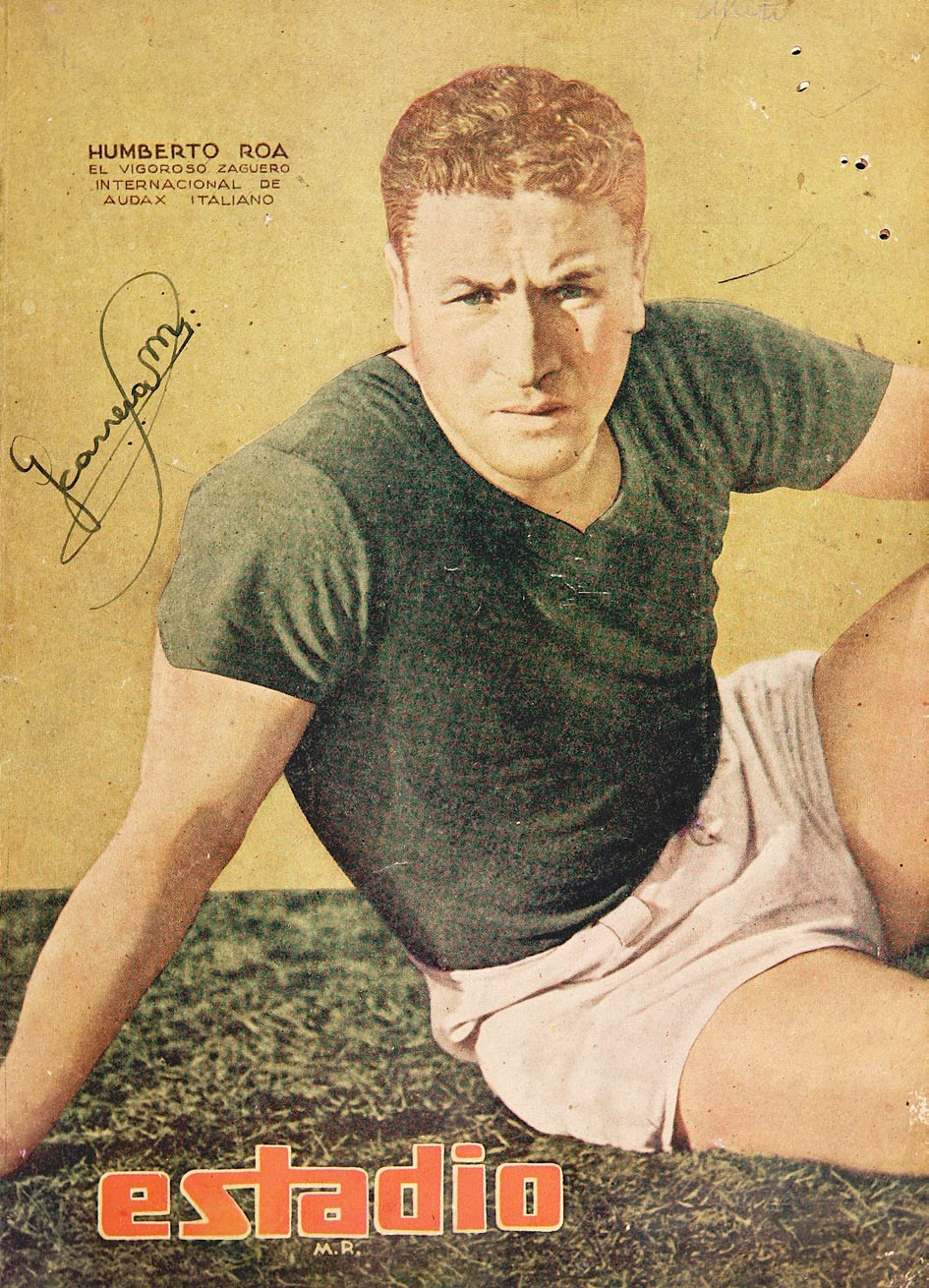

Personal information
- Full name: Humberto Roa Gajardo
- Date of birth: 21 February 1912
- Place of birth: Talcahuano, Chile
- Date of death: 19 February 1986 (aged 73)
- Position: Defender

International career
Years	Team	Apps	(Gls)
1939–1945	Chile	12	(0)

Humberto Roa (21 February 1912 – 19 February 1986) was a Chilean footballer. He played in 12 matches for the Chile national football team from 1939 to 1945. He was also part of Chile's squad for the 1939 South American Championship.
