= Juan Flores (1930s footballer) =

Peruvian footballer

Personal information
- Place of birth: Peru
- Position: Forward

Senior career*
Years	Team	Apps	(Gls)
1937	Mariscal Sucre		(10)
- * Club domestic league appearances and goals

Juan Flores was a professional association footballer from Peru. He played primarily as a forward.

== Club career ==
During his career, Flores played for Mariscal Sucre FBC and in the 1937 Campeonato Peruano de Fútbol season he finished as the league's top scorer.
