= Julio Córdova =

Chilean footballer (1911–1986)

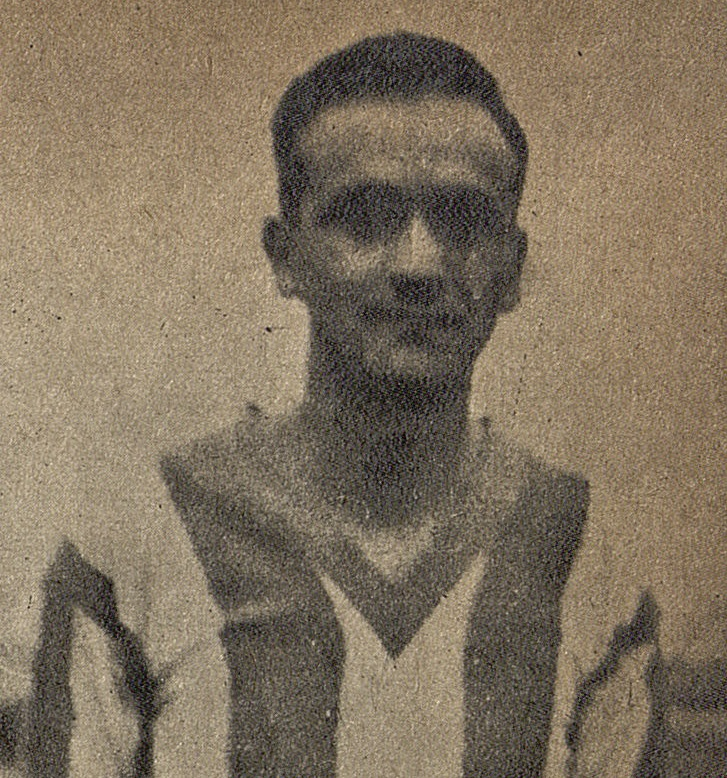

Personal information
- Date of birth: 7 February 1911
- Date of death: 9 July 1986 (aged 75)
- Position: Defender

International career
Years	Team	Apps	(Gls)
1939	Chile	3	(0)

Julio Córdova (7 February 1911 – 9 July 1986) was a Chilean footballer. He played in three matches for the Chile national football team in 1939. He was also part of Chile's squad for the 1939 South American Championship.
