= General Viana =

Uruguayan footballer (1913-1958)

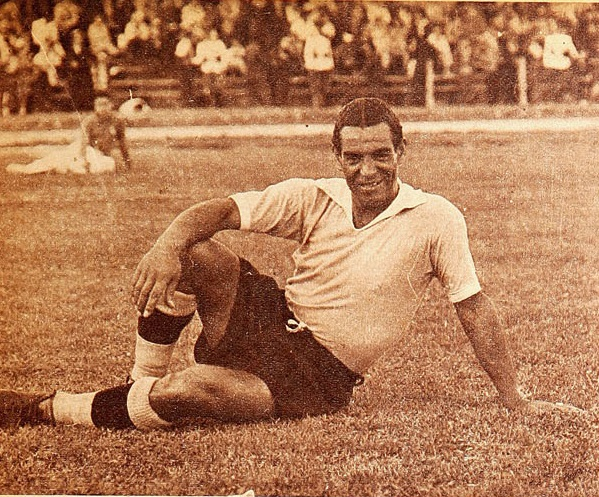

Personal information
- Full name: General Viana Spósito
- Date of birth: 3 December 1913
- Place of birth: Montevideo, Uruguay
- Date of death: 6 November 1958 (aged 44)

International career
Years	Team	Apps	(Gls)
1939–1945	Uruguay	9	(0)

General Viana (3 December 1913 – 6 November 1958) was a Uruguayan footballer. He played in nine matches for the Uruguay national football team from 1939 to 1945. He was also part of Uruguay's squad for the 1945 South American Championship.
