= List of Colombia national football team managers =

The Colombia national football team has been under the supervision of 42 different managers since its first match in 1938.

== Managers ==
#	Manager	Nat	Tenure	Pld	W	D*	L	Win %	GF	GA	GD	Major tournaments
1	Alfonso Novoa	(Colombia)	10/02/1938 – 23/02/1938	5	2	0	3	40%	10	11	–1	
2	Fernando Paternoster	(Argentina)	08/08/1938 – 21/08/1938	4	1	0	3	25%	6	8	–2	
3	Roberto Meléndez	(Colombia)	21/01/1945 – 21/02/1945	6	1	1	4	17%	7	25	–18	CA 1945 – Fifth place
4	José Arana Cruz	(Peru)	09/12/1946 – 20/12/1946	6	6	0	0	100%	20	7	13	
5	Lino Taioli	(Argentina) (Venezuela)	02/12/1947 – 29/12/1947	7	0	2	5	0%	2	19	–17	CA 1947 – Eighth place
6	Friedrich Donnenfeld	(Austria)	03/04/1949 – 11/05/1949	7	0	2	5	0%	4	23	–19	CA 1949 – Eighth place
7	Pedro López	(Colombia)	16/03/1957 – 01/04/1957	6	2	0	4	33%	10	25	–15	CA 1957 – Fifth place
8	Rodolfo Orlandini	(Argentina)	16/06/1957 – 07/07/1957	5	0	1	4	0%	4	10	–6	WC 1958
9	Adolfo Pedernera	(Argentina)	05/02/1961 – 07/06/1962	9	2	3	4	22%	11	16	–5	WC 1962 – Group stage
10	Gabriel Ochoa Uribe	(Colombia)	10/03/1963 – 31/03/1963	6	0	1	5	0%	10	19	–9	CA 1963 – Seventh place
11	Efraín Sánchez	(Colombia)	01/09/1963 – 04/09/1963	2	1	0	1	50%	5	5	0	
12	Antonio Julio de la Hoz	(Colombia)	20/06/1965 – 07/08/1965	4	1	0	3	25%	4	10	–6	WC 1966
13	Cesar López Fretes	(Paraguay)	30/11/1966 – 11/12/1966	2	0	1	1	0%	2	5	–3	CA 1967 – Did not qualify
14	Francisco Zuluaga	(Colombia)	16/10/1968 – 24/08/1969	14	1	3	10	7%	14	29	–15	WC 1970
15	Cesar López Fretes	(Paraguay)	20/05/1970 – 20/05/1970	1	0	0	1	0%	0	4	–4	
16	Toza Veselinović	(Socialist Federal Republic of Yugoslavia)	29/03/1972 – 05/07/1973	13	2	5	6	15%	12	20	–8	WC 1974
17	Efraín Sánchez	(Colombia)	20/07/1975 – 28/10/1975	9	6	0	3	67%	11	5	6	CA 1975 – Runners-up
18	Blagoje Vidinić	(Socialist Federal Republic of Yugoslavia)	15/10/1976 – 05/09/1979	14	3	3	8	21%	10	20	–10	WC 1978 CA 1979 – Group stage
19	Carlos Bilardo	(Argentina)	05/01/1980 – 13/09/1981	10	1	4	5	10%	10	16	–6	WC 1982
20	Efraín Sánchez	(Colombia)	14/02/1983 – 11/10/1984	14	3	8	3	21%	11	11	0	CA 1983 – Group stage
21	Gabriel Ochoa Uribe	(Colombia)	01/02/1985 – 03/11/1985	19	8	5	6	42%	23	23	0	WC 1986
22	Francisco Maturana	(Colombia)	11/06/1987 – 23/06/1990	40	20	11	9	50%	49	30	19	CA 1987 – Third place CA 1989 – Group stage WC 1990 – Round of 16
23	Luis Augusto García	(Colombia)	29/01/1991 – 21/07/1991	11	3	4	4	27%	10	11	–1	CA 1991 – Fourth place
24	Humberto Ortiz	(Colombia)	08/07/1992 – 02/08/1992	3	1	1	1	33%	1	1	0	
25	Francisco Maturana	(Colombia)	24/02/1993 – 26/06/1994	34	18	13	3	53%	49	20	29	CA 1993 – Third place WC 1994 – Group stage
26	Hernán Darío Gómez	(Colombia)	31/01/1995 – 26/06/1998	58	21	18	19	36%	68	64	4	CA 1995 – Third place CA 1997 – Quarter-finals WC 1998 – Group stage
27	Javier Álvarez	(Colombia)	09/02/1999 – 19/11/1999	15	5	5	5	33%	24	21	3	CA 1999 – Quarter-finals
28	Luis Augusto García	(Colombia)	12/02/2000 – 24/04/2001	21	11	5	5	52%	27	20	7	
29	Francisco Maturana	(Colombia)	03/06/2001 – 14/11/2001	13	9	2	2	69%	21	7	14	CA 2001 – Champions WC 2002
30	Reinaldo Rueda	(Colombia)	07/05/2002 – 12/05/2002	3	1	1	1	33%	3	3	0	
31	Francisco Maturana	(Colombia)	20/11/2002 – 19/11/2003	18	3	7	8	17%	9	17	–8	
32	Reinaldo Rueda	(Colombia)	18/02/2004 – 12/10/2006	40	17	12	11	43%	55	39	16	CA 2004 – Fourth place WC 2006
33	Jorge Luis Pinto	(Colombia)	01/01/2007 – 01/09/2008	25	11	7	7	44%	33	27	6	CA 2007 – Group stage
34	Eduardo Lara	(Colombia)	01/09/2008 – 01/11/2009	17	8	1	8	47%	18	20	–2	WC 2010
35	Hernán Darío Gómez	(Colombia)	04/05/2010 – 22/08/2011	15	5	5	5	33%	12	11	1	CA 2011 – Quarter-finals
36	Leonel Álvarez	(Colombia)	25/08/2011 – 14/12/2011	5	3	1	1	60%	8	4	4	
37	José Pékerman	(Argentina)	04/01/2012 – 04/09/2018	78	42	20	16	54%	124	59	65	WC 2014 – Quarter-finals CA 2015 – Quarter-finals; CA 2016 – Third place WC 2018 – Round of 16
38	Arturo Reyes	(Colombia)	01/09/2018 – 31/10/2018	4	3	1	0	75%	9	4	5	
39	Carlos Queiroz	(Portugal)	07/02/2019 – 02/12/2020	18	9	5	4	50%	22	18	4	CA 2019 – Quarter-finals
40	Reinaldo Rueda	(Colombia)	14/01/2021 – 18/04/2022	22	7	10	5	32%	23	13	7	CA 2021 – Third place WC 2022
41	Héctor Cárdenas	(Colombia)	05/06/2022	1	1	0	0	100%	1	0	1	
42	Néstor Lorenzo	(Argentina)	24/09/2022 – present	51	31	13	7	61%	93	40	53	CA 2024 – Runners-up WC 2026 – Round of 16
Totals				660	271	183	206	41%	849	745	+104	

Last updated: Colombia vs. Chile, 17 November 2026. Statistics include official FIFA-recognised matches only.
