= Ramón Unamuno =

Ecuadorian footballer and coach (1907–1973)

- Born: 4 February 1907
- Died: 7 July 1973 (aged 66)
- Occupations: Football player and coach

Ramón Isaías Unamuno Álvarez (4 February 1907 — 7 July 1973) was an Ecuadorian footballer and coach. He coached the Ecuador national team at the 1939 and 1947 South American Championships, and also played one match as a forward in the first of these, featuring in a 5–2 loss to Peru.

During his career he also coached the Emelec and Barcelona teams, both from the Ecuador's largest city, Guayaquil. His tenure at Barcelona was particularly successful. He had two spells as manager, claiming a Serie A title during each - the first in 1960 and the second exactly a decade later.

Due to his success as a coach, there is a stadium in Guayaquil named Estadio Ramón Unamuno. Built in 1922 as Estadio Guayaquil and housing around 5,000 spectators, it was the home stadium for both Barcelona and Emelec until the construction of Estadio George Capwell in 1945. It was renamed in Unamuno's honour after his time as coach of these teams, and is now home to smaller local teams Fedeguayas and Estudiantes de Guayas.
