= Alfredo France =

Chilean footballer (1895–1938)

Personal information
- Date of birth: 29 October 1895
- Date of death: 17 March 1938 (aged 42)
- Position: Forward

International career
Years	Team	Apps	(Gls)
1916	Chile	4	(1)

Alfredo France (29 October 1895 – 17 March 1938) was a Chilean footballer. He played in four matches for the Chile national football team in 1916. He was also part of Chile's squad for the 1916 South American Championship.
