= Football at the 1938 Bolivarian Games =

Tournament details
- Host country: Colombia
- Dates: 6–22 August 1938 (16 days)
- Teams: 5 (from 1 confederation)
- Venue: 1 (in 1 host city)

Final positions
- Champions: Peru (1st title)
- Runners-up: Bolivia
- Third place: Ecuador
- Fourth place: Colombia

Tournament statistics
- Matches played: 11
- Goals scored: 46 (4.18 per match)
- Top scorer: Jorge Alcalde (6 goals)

The football tournament at the 1938 Bolivarian Games was held in Bogotá from 6 to 22 August.

Five of the six participating countries entered the tournament, which were Peru, Bolivia, Ecuador, Colombia, Venezuela. This was the first and only time that full national teams for every country took part in this tournament. The gold medal was won by Peru, who earned 8 points.

== Table ==
Each team played against each of the other teams. 2 points system used.

| Pos | Team | Pld | W | D | L | GF | GA | GD | Pts |
|---|---|---|---|---|---|---|---|---|---|
| 1 | Peru (C) | 4 | 4 | 0 | 0 | 18 | 4 | +14 | 8 |
| 2 | Bolivia | 4 | 2 | 1 | 1 | 6 | 6 | 0 | 5 |
| 3 | Ecuador | 4 | 2 | 1 | 1 | 9 | 13 | −4 | 5 |
| 4 | Colombia | 4 | 1 | 0 | 3 | 6 | 8 | −2 | 2 |
| 5 | Venezuela | 4 | 0 | 0 | 4 | 4 | 12 | −8 | 0 |

(C) Champions
- As Bolivia and Ecuador were tied for second place, a playoff was disputed.

== Results ==
=== First round ===
8 August 1938

| Bolivia | 1–1 | Ecuador |
|---|---|---|
| | Report |

Estadio Universitario, Bogotá
Referee: Esteva Tejada (Mexico)

8 August 1938
10:45

| Colombia | 2–4 | Peru |
|---|---|---|
| Botto 71', 75' | Report | Ibáñez 10', 60'; T. Fernández 40'; Alcalde 57' |

Estadio Universitario, Bogotá
Attendance: 20,000
Referee: Esteva Tejada (Mexico)

10 August 1938

| Colombia | 1–2 | Ecuador |
|---|---|---|
| Mier 33' | Report | Freire (??); Herrera (??) |

Estadio El Campín, Bogotá
Referee: Esteva Tejada (Mexico)

11 August 1938

| Bolivia | 3–1 | Venezuela |
|---|---|---|
| Molina 35', 48', 80' | Report | Mújica 10' |

Estadio Universitario, Bogotá
Referee: Esteva Tejada (Mexico)

11 August 1938

| Peru | 9–1 | Ecuador |
|---|---|---|
| Alcalde 40', 43', 60', 88'; Bielich 65', 68'; Espinar 14', 24', 50' | Report | Suárez 16' |

Estadio Universitario, Bogotá
Referee: Esteva Tejada (Mexico)

13 August 1938

| Colombia | 2–0 | Venezuela |
|---|---|---|
| Umaña 25'; Torres 35' | Report |

Estadio Universitario, Bogotá
Referee: Esteva Tejada (Mexico)

14 August 1938

| Peru | 3–0 | Bolivia |
|---|---|---|
| T. Fernández 18', 85'; Alcalde 33' | Report |

Estadio Universitario, Bogotá
Referee: Esteva Tejada (Mexico)

16 August 1938

| Bolivia | 2–1 | Colombia |
|---|---|---|
| Alborta (??); Montoya (??) | Report | Mejía (??) |

Estadio Universitario, Bogotá
Referee: Esteva Tejada (Mexico)

17 August 1938

| Peru | 2–1 | Venezuela |
|---|---|---|
| Bielich 45'; Paredes 47' | Report | Ríos 75' |

Estadio Universitario, Bogotá
Referee: Esteva Tejada (Mexico)

19 August 1938

| Ecuador | 5–2 | Venezuela |
|---|---|---|
| Andara (??); Arenas (??); Freire (??); Herrera (??); Suárez (??) | Report | Corao (??); Ríos (??) |

Estadio El Campín, Bogotá
Referee: Esteva Tejada (Mexico)

=== Silver medal match ===
22 August 1938

| Bolivia | 2–1 | Ecuador |
|---|---|---|
| Plaza (??) | Report | Zambrano (??) |

Estadio Universitario, Bogotá
Referee: Esteva Tejada (Mexico)
