= Manuel Muñoz (footballer) =

Chilean footballer (1928–2022)

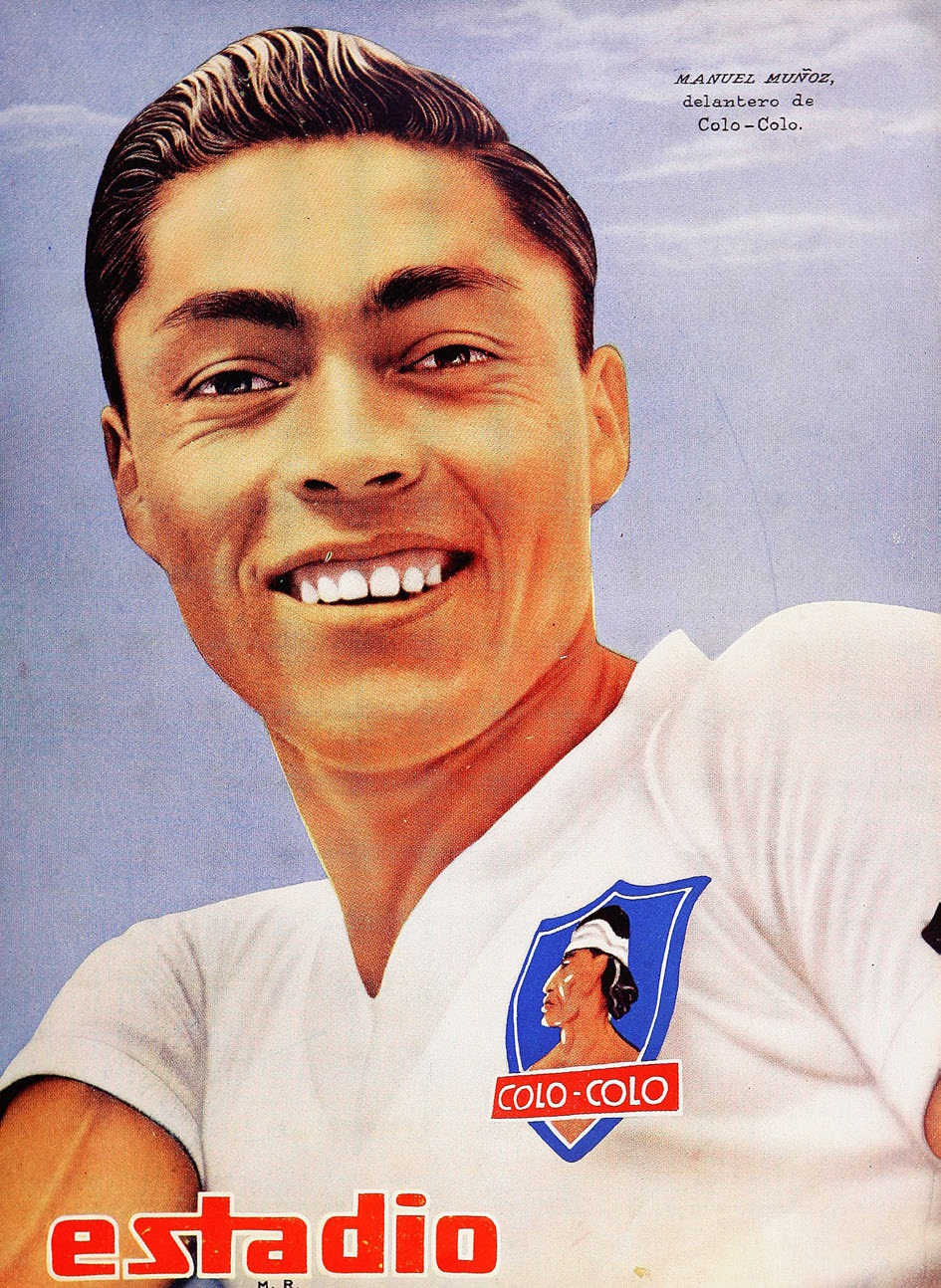
- Muñoz in 1951

Personal information
- Full name: Manuel Muñoz Muñoz
- Date of birth: 28 April 1928
- Place of birth: Tocopilla, Chile
- Date of death: 17 December 2022 (aged 94)
- Place of death: Arica, Chile
- Position: Forward

Senior career*
Years	Team	Apps	(Gls)
1949–1958	Colo-Colo		(55)

International career
1950–1956	Chile	26	(8)
- * Club domestic league appearances and goals

Manuel Muñoz Muñoz (28 April 1928 – 17 December 2022) was a Chilean footballer who played as a forward for Chile in the 1950 FIFA World Cup. He also played for Colo-Colo.

Muñoz died on 17 December 2022, at the age of 94.
