= Guillermo Díaz (footballer, born 1930) =

Chilean footballer (1930–1997)

Guillermo Diaz
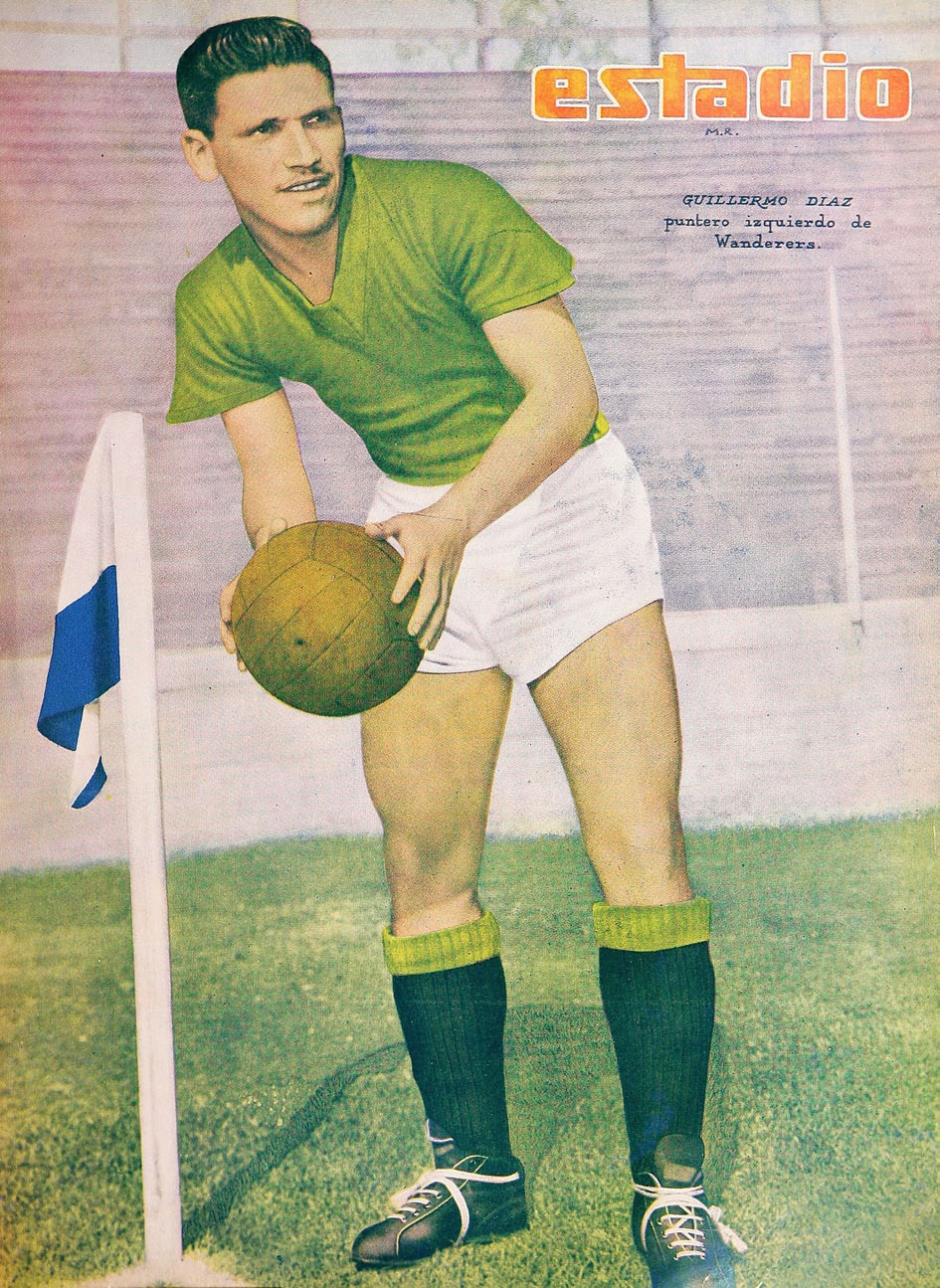

Personal information
- Full name: Guillermo Eduardo Díaz Zambrano
- Date of birth: 29 December 1930
- Place of birth: Valparaíso, Chile
- Date of death: 25 September 1997 (aged 66)
- Place of death: Santiago, Chile
- Position: Left winger

Youth career
- Yelcho
- Gold Cross
- Santiago Wanderers

Senior career*
Years	Team	Apps	(Gls)
1949–1952	Santiago Wanderers		(1)
1953	Real Zaragoza	5	(0)
1953–1954	Santiago Wanderers		
1955–1960	Palestino		
1961–1963	Santiago Wanderers	13	
1964	Montreal Cantalia		
1964	Santiago Wanderers		

International career
1950–1957	Chile	19	(7)

Managerial career
- 1963: Marcos Serrano
- 1964–1966: Luis Cruz Martínez
- 1967: Santiago Wanderers
- 1968: Unión San Felipe
- 1969: Universidad Católica (assistant)
- 1975–1977: Deportes Ovalle
- 1978–1979: Santiago Wanderers
- 1979–1981: San Antonio Unido
- 1981: Cobresal
- 1982: Santiago Wanderers
- 1984–1986: Santiago Wanderers
- 1989–1990: Santiago Wanderers (youth)
- 1991: Provincial Osorno
- * Club domestic league appearances and goals

Guillermo Eduardo Díaz Zambrano (29 December 1930 – 25 September 1997) was a Chilean footballer who played as a left winger. He played for Chile in the 1950 FIFA World Cup. He also played for Santiago Wanderers.

== Record at FIFA Tournaments ==
National team	Year	Apps	Goals
Chile	1950	2	0
Chile	1958	3	1
