= Iván Mayo =

Chilean footballer (1910–1979)

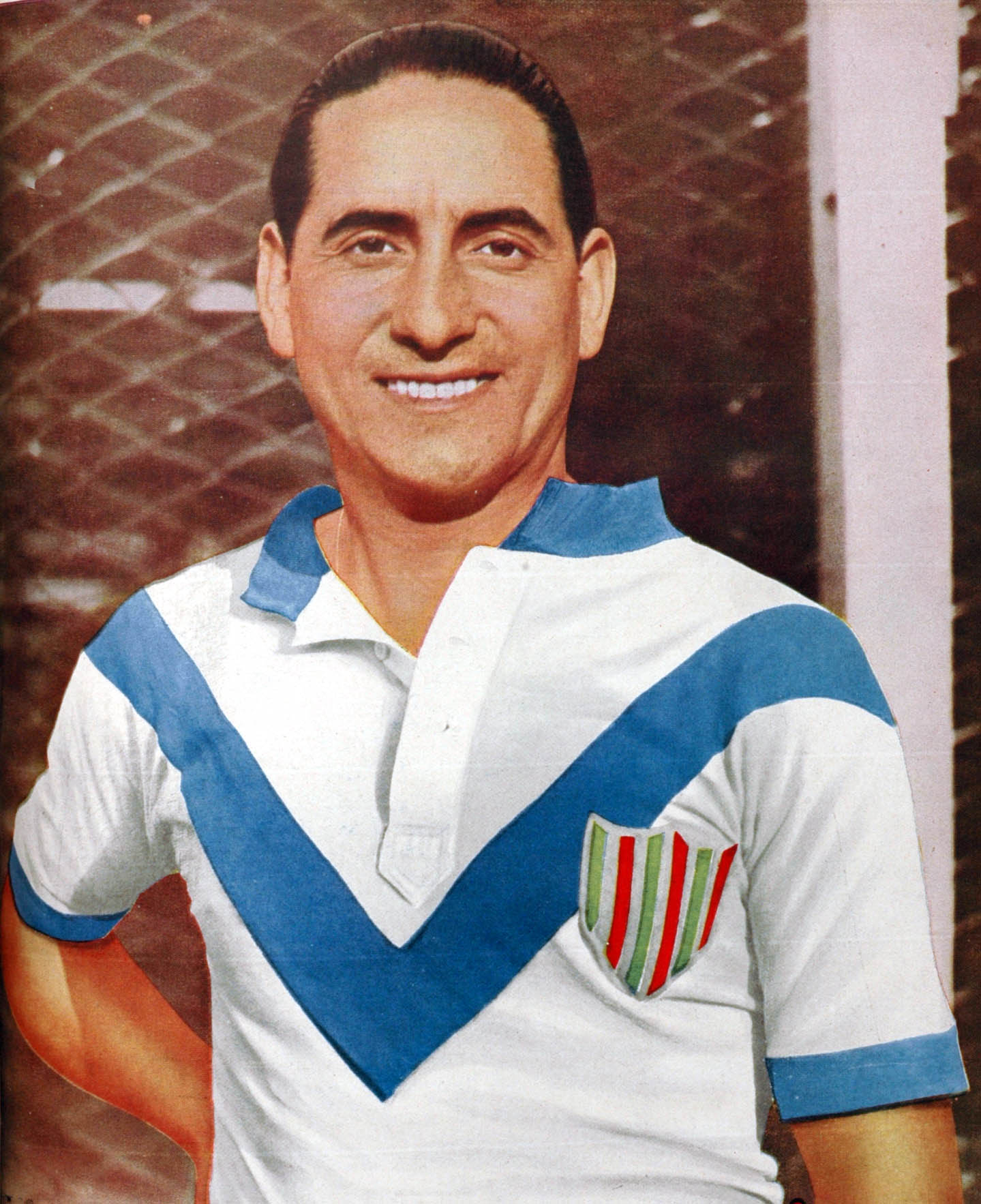
- Mayo with Vélez Sarsfield.

Personal information
- Full name: Iván Mayo Román
- Date of birth: 23 June 1910
- Place of birth: Quillota, Chile
- Date of death: 22 January 1979 (aged 68)
- Place of death: Santiago, Chile
- Position: Forward

Youth career
- San Luis

Senior career*
Years	Team	Apps	(Gls)
1925–1931	San Luis		
1928	→ Deportes Santiago (loan)		
1929	→ Combinado Universitario (loan)		
1932–1933	Colo-Colo		
1933–1938	Vélez Sarsfield	108	(46)
1939	Santiago Morning		
1943	Iberia		
- * Club domestic league appearances and goals

Iván Mayo Román (23 June 1910 – 22 January 1979) was a Chilean footballer who played as a forward.

== Early years ==
Born in Quillota, his father, Liborio Mayo, was Spanish and his mother, María Ester Román, was Argentine. The Mayo family owned a bakery and the older son, Liborio Jr., was one of the founders of San Luis de Quillota. In his studying career at the Quillota Institute he stood out as a sportsman in football, boxing and basketball.

== Career ==
In 1925, Mayo joined San Luis de Quillota first team at the age of 15, in addition to take part of the basketball team of the same club along with his fellow footballer Óscar Alfaro. In 1928 and 1929 he was loaned to Deportes Santiago, in a tour for Lima, and Combinado Universitario, in a tour for Buenos Aires, respectively. Along with San Luis, he won the Copa Confraternidad Chileno Peruana, in a friendly match versus Peruvian club Atlético Chalaco played in 1928, the first international game for the club, where Mayo scored 3 goals in the 4–3 win.

In 1932, he moved to Colo-Colo, where he made an important attacking pair along with Guillermo Subiabre, becoming a renowned goalscorer and an idol for the club before the Chilean Primera División began in 1933.

In 1933, he moved to Argentina and tried to join Racing Club de Avellaneda, but finally he joined Vélez Sarsfield, becoming the team captain and making two appearances in the cover of the renowned sports magazine El Gráfico: 737 edition (26 August 1933) and 823 edition (20 April 1935). As an important landmark, he scored in the first win of Vélez Sarsfield as a professional club.

After suffering serious injuries, he returned to Chile and joined Santiago Morning. His last club was Deportes Iberia in 1943.

Despite having been a successful player in Chile and Argentina, he couldn't take part of the Chile national team for the 1935 South American Championship due to the fact that players abroad weren't repatriated by the Chilean football association.

== Personal life ==
Mayo was nicknamed Chincolito (Little Andean Sparrow), due to the fact that he used to run like the bird, making little jumps.

Following his retirement, he worked as administrator of the Estadio Municipal Lucio Fariña Fernández.

In his last years, he lived sick and had many debts. In 1963, some former fellow footballers organized a match in the Estadio Santa Laura to help him and collected 3 thousand Chilean escudos.

He died in Santiago and was laid to rest in the Colo-Colo mausoleum inside the Santiago General Cemetery.

== Legacy ==
In 16 March 1938, it was founded Club Deportivo Iván Mayo from Villa Alemana, in honor of Iván. The club has taken part of both the Tercera and the Segunda División of the Chilean football until 1996. Since 2019, it has tried to return to the Chilean football league system.

His great-great-grandnephew, Ignacio Mayo Correa, has played for the Unión Española youth ranks as a right midfielder.

== Honours ==
San Luis

- Copa Confraternidad Chileno Peruana: 1928
