= Gustavo Pizarro =

Chilean footballer (1916-1989)

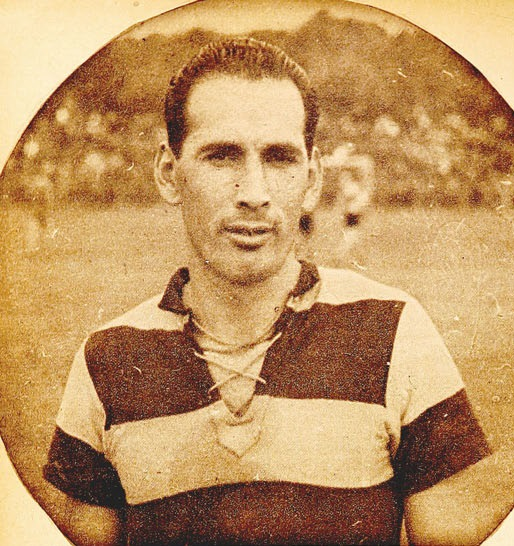

Personal information
- Date of birth: 24 April 1916
- Date of death: 22 December 1989 (aged 73)
- Position: Forward

International career
Years	Team	Apps	(Gls)
1939	Chile	4	(0)

Gustavo Pizarro (24 April 1916 – 22 December 1989) was a Chilean footballer. He played in four matches for the Chile national football team in 1939. He was also part of Chile's squad for the 1939 South American Championship.
