= Roberto Luco (footballer, born 1907) =

Chilean footballer

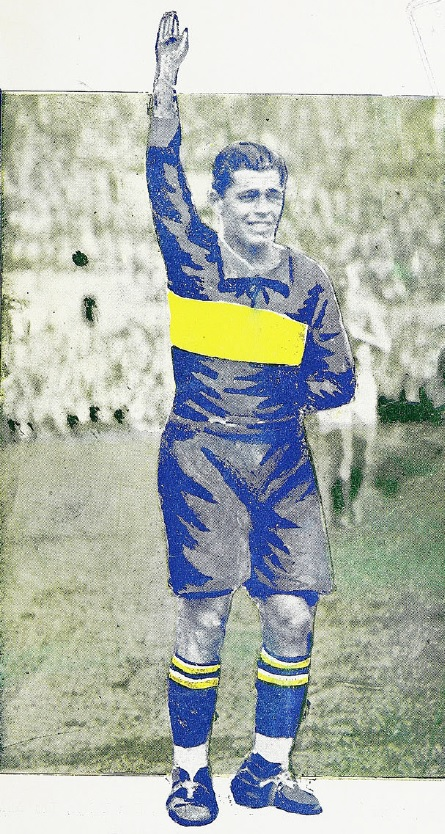
- Luco with Boca Juniors in 1934

Personal information
- Full name: Roberto Santiago Luco Belmar
- Date of birth: 9 January 1907
- Place of birth: Antofagasta, Chile
- Date of death: 16 August 1974 (aged 67)
- Position: Forward

Senior career*
Years	Team	Apps	(Gls)
1930–1931	Bádminton		
1932–1933	Colo-Colo		
1934–1936	Boca Juniors	9	(0)
1936–1939	Colo-Colo		

International career
1933	Combinado del Pacífico		
1939	Chile	3	(1)
- * Club domestic league appearances and goals

Roberto Santiago Luco Belmar (9 January 1907 – 16 August 1974) was a Chilean footballer.

== Club career ==
Born in Antofagasta, Luco began his career playing for the amateur team of Curicó at the beginning of the 1930s and then he played for Badminton and Colo-Colo before moving to Argentina and joining Boca Juniors in 1934. The deal was for thirty four thousand Chilean pesos, a lot of money at these time, becoming the first Chilean to play for that club and the second one to play in Argentina after Iván Mayo, who played for Vélez Sarsfield. Along with Boca Juniors, he won two local championships and then he returned Colo-Colo, winning the first professional title for the club in 1937.

== International career ==
In 1933, Luco took part of the Combinado del Pacífico (Pacific Ocean Team), a squad made up for both Chilean and Peruvian players, that played friendly matches in both America and Europe

For the Chile national football team, he played in three matches in 1939. He was also part of Chile's squad for the 1939 South American Championship.

== Honours ==
Boca Juniors

- Argentine Primera División (2): 1934, 1935

Colo-Colo

- Chilean Primera División (2): 1937, 1939
