= 1937 Ligas Provinciales de Lima y Callao =

Ligas Provinciales de Lima y Callao
- Season: 1937
- Dates: 19 September 1937 – 29 May 1938
- Champions: Ciclista Lima (Lima); Progresista Apurímac (Callao)
- Relegated: Alianza Cóndor; Sport Inca; Atlético Excelsior

The 1937 Ligas Provinciales de Lima y Callao, the second division of Peruvian football (soccer), was played by 19 teams (10 from the Liga Provincial de Lima and 8 from the Liga Provincial del Callao). The tournament winners, Ciclista Lima and Progresista Apurímac were promoted to the 1938 Peruvian Primera División. From 1931 until 1942 the points system was W:3, D:2, L:1, walkover:0.

== Teams ==
=== Team changes ===
Promoted from 1936 División Intermedia (Lima)	Promoted from 1936 División Intermedia (Callao)
▲ Alianza Cóndor (1st) ▲ Atlético Peruano (2nd) ▲ Santiago Barranco (Serie 1 - 2nd) ▲ Miguel Grau (Serie 2 - 2nd) ▲ Independencia Miraflores (Serie 1 - 3rd) ▲ Sport Inca (Serie 2 - 3rd)	▲ Unión Estrella (1st) ▲ Social San Carlos (2nd)

=== Stadia and Locations ===
Team	City
Alianza Cóndor	La Victoria, Lima
Atlético Córdoba	Barrios Altos, Lima
Atlético Excelsior	Callao
Atlético Peruano	Rímac, Lima
Ciclista Lima	Cercado de Lima
Independencia Miraflores	Miraflores, Lima
Jorge Chávez	Callao
Miguel Grau	Rímac, Lima
Porteño	Callao
Progresista Apurímac	Callao
Santiago Barranco	Barranco, Lima
Social San Carlos	Callao
Sport Inca	Rímac, Lima
Sport Progreso	Rímac, Lima
Unión Buenos Aires	Callao
Unión Carbone	Barrios Altos, Lima
Unión Estrella	Callao
White Star	Callao

== Liga Provincial de Lima ==
=== Primeros Equipos ===
Pos	Team	Pld	W	D	L	GF	GA	GD	Pts	Promotion or relegation
1	Ciclista Lima	9	6	1	2	27	13	+14	22	Title Play-off
2	Unión Carbone	9	6	1	2	11	4	+7	22	Title Play-off
3	Sport Progreso	9	6	1	2	16	10	+6	22	Title Play-off
4	Santiago Barranco	9	5	1	3	16	14	+2	20	
5	Atlético Córdoba	9	3	3	3	16	12	+4	18	
6	Miguel Grau	9	4	0	5	13	14	−1	16	
7	Atlético Peruano	9	2	3	4	8	9	−1	16	
8	Independencia Miraflores	9	3	1	5	10	20	−10	16	
9	Alianza Cóndor	9	2	2	5	10	18	−8	15	
10	Sport Inca	9	1	1	7	10	23	−13	12	

==== Results ====
Teams play each other once, either home or away. The matches were played only in Lima.

Home \ Away	ALI	COR	PER	CIC	IND	GRA	SAN	INC	PRO	CAR
Alianza Cóndor		3–3	0–0			1–3		3–1		
Atlético Córdoba			2–0		2–3			4–0	1–1	
Atlético Peruano				0–2		4–1			0–2	1–0
Ciclista Lima	5–2	3–3				2–1	6–0			0–2
Independencia Miraflores	0–1		0–0	3–2			1–4			0–3
Miguel Grau		1–0			1–2			3–0	0–3	
Santiago Barranco	3–0	1–0	1–0			2–3		3–1		
Sport Inca			1–1	2–3	4–0					1–2
Sport Progreso	1–0			0–4	3–1		2–0	4–0		
Unión Carbone	2–0	0–1				W.O.	1–1		1–0	

Updated to match(es) played on unknown. Source: Diario El Comercio, La Prensa and Crónica.
Legend: Blue = home team win; Yellow = draw; Red = away team win.

==== Title Play-off ====
Pos	Team	Pld	W	D	L	GF	GA	GD	Pts	Promotion or relegation
1	Ciclista Lima (C, O)	2	2	0	0	7	4	+3	6	1938 Primera División
2	Sport Progreso	2	0	1	1	4	5	−1	3	
3	Unión Carbone	2	0	1	1	4	6	−2	3	

(C) Champions; (O) Play-off winners
23 May 1938

Unión Carbone	2–2	Sport Progreso

Lima
26 May 1938

Ciclista Lima	3–2	Sport Progreso

Lima
29 May 1938

Ciclista Lima	4–2	Unión Carbone

Lima

=== Tabla Absoluta ===
Pos	Team	Pld	W	D	L	GF	GA	GD	Pts	Resv.	Total	Qualification or relegation
1	Ciclista Lima (C)	9	6	1	2	27	13	+14	22	3.25	25.25	1938 Primera División
2	Sport Progreso	9	6	1	2	16	10	+6	22	2.5	24.5	
3	Unión Carbone	9	6	1	2	11	4	+7	22	2.25	24.25	
4	Santiago Barranco	9	5	1	3	16	14	+2	20	0.75	20.75	
5	Atlético Córdoba	9	3	3	3	16	12	+4	18	2.25	20.25	
6	Independencia Miraflores	9	3	1	5	10	20	−10	16	3.375	19.375	
7	Miguel Grau	9	4	0	5	13	14	−1	16	3.125	19.125	
8	Atlético Peruano	9	2	3	4	8	9	−1	16	2.125	18.125	
9	Alianza Cóndor (R)	9	2	2	5	10	18	−8	15	2	17	1938 División Intermedia
10	Sport Inca (R)	9	1	1	7	10	23	−13	12	1.75	13.75	1938 División Intermedia

== Liga Provincial del Callao ==
=== Primeros Equipos ===
Pos	Team	Pld	W	D	L	GF	GA	GD	Pts
1	Progresista Apurímac	7	5	2	0	14	6	+8	19
2	Unión Buenos Aires	7	4	1	2	24	14	+10	16
3	White Star	7	3	2	2	15	11	+4	15
4	Porteño	7	3	1	3	14	18	−4	14
5	Unión Estrella	7	2	2	3	12	11	+1	13
6	Social San Carlos	7	2	2	3	11	13	−2	13
7	Jorge Chávez	7	2	2	3	10	17	−7	13
8	Atlético Excelsior	7	0	2	5	5	15	−10	9

==== Results ====
Teams play each other once, either home or away. The matches were played only in Callao.

Home \ Away	EXC	JCH	POR	PRO	CAR	UBA	UES	WHI
Atlético Excelsior			0–3		0–0		1–1	2–3
Jorge Chávez	3–2				1–1	1–7		
Porteño		1–4		2–2				0–5
Progresista Apurímac	1–0	3–0			1–0		1–1	
Social San Carlos			3–2			3–4		2–0
Unión Buenos Aires	4–0		3–4	2–3			2–1	
Unión Estrella		2–0	1–2		5–2			1–3
White Star		1–1		1–3		2–2		

Updated to match(es) played on 1937. Source: Diario El Comercio, La Prensa and Crónica.
Legend: Blue = home team win; Yellow = draw; Red = away team win.

=== Tabla Absoluta ===
Pos	Team	Pld	W	D	L	GF	GA	GD	Pts	Resv.	Total	Qualification or relegation
1	Progresista Apurímac (C)	7	5	2	0	14	6	+8	19	2.375	21.375	1938 Primera División
2	White Star	7	3	2	2	15	11	+4	15	2.5	17.5	
3	Unión Buenos Aires	7	4	1	2	24	14	+10	16	1.25	17.25	
4	Porteño	7	3	1	3	14	18	−4	14	2.875	16.875	
5	Jorge Chávez	7	2	2	3	10	17	−7	13	2.5	15.5	
6	Social San Carlos	7	2	2	3	11	13	−2	13	2.125	15.125	
7	Unión Estrella	7	2	2	3	12	11	+1	13	1.875	14.875	
8	Atlético Excelsior (R)	7	0	2	5	5	15	−10	9	0.625	9.625	1938 División Intermedia

== See also ==
- 1937 Peruvian Primera División
