= Armando Contreras =

Chilean footballer (1919–1991)

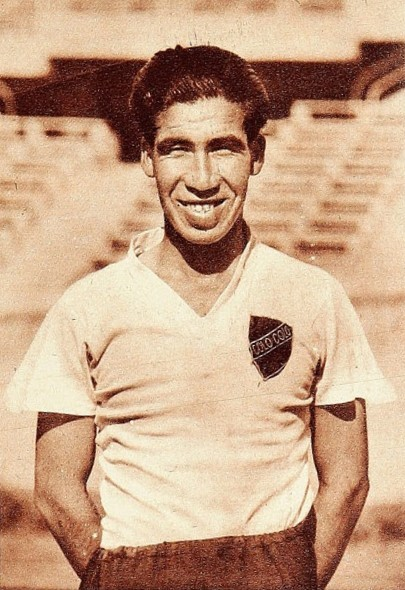
- Contreras 1953

Personal information
- Full name: Luis Armando Contreras Reyes
- Date of birth: 15 June 1919
- Place of birth: Aguas Blancas, Chile
- Date of death: 3 August 1991 (aged 72)
- Place of death: Santiago, Chile
- Position: Winger

Youth career
- Escuela 57
- Colo-Colo

Senior career*
Years	Team	Apps	(Gls)
1939–1943	Colo-Colo	83	(45)
1943–1944	Banfield		
1944–1946	Colo-Colo	30	(12)
1946–1947	América		

International career
1941–1945	Chile	14	(2)
- * Club domestic league appearances and goals

Luis Armando Contreras Reyes (15 June 1919 – 3 August 1991), known as Armando Contreras, was a Chilean footballer who played as a winger.

== Club career ==
Born in Aguas Blancas, an extinct commune in the current Antofagasta Province, Contreras made his debut with Colo-Colo on 20 May 1939.

In 1943–44 he played for Argentine club Banfield.

Back in Chile, he rejoined Colo-Colo until 1946. In total, he made 137 appearances and scored 70 goals in all tournaments for them.

At the end of his career, he played for Mexican club América.

== International career ==
Contreras played in 14 matches for the Chile national team from 1941 to 1945. He was also part of Chile's squad for the 1941 South American Championship.

== Personal life ==
Contreras was nicknamed and well known as Norton Contreras.
