= Pedro Hugo López =

Chilean footballer (1927-1959)

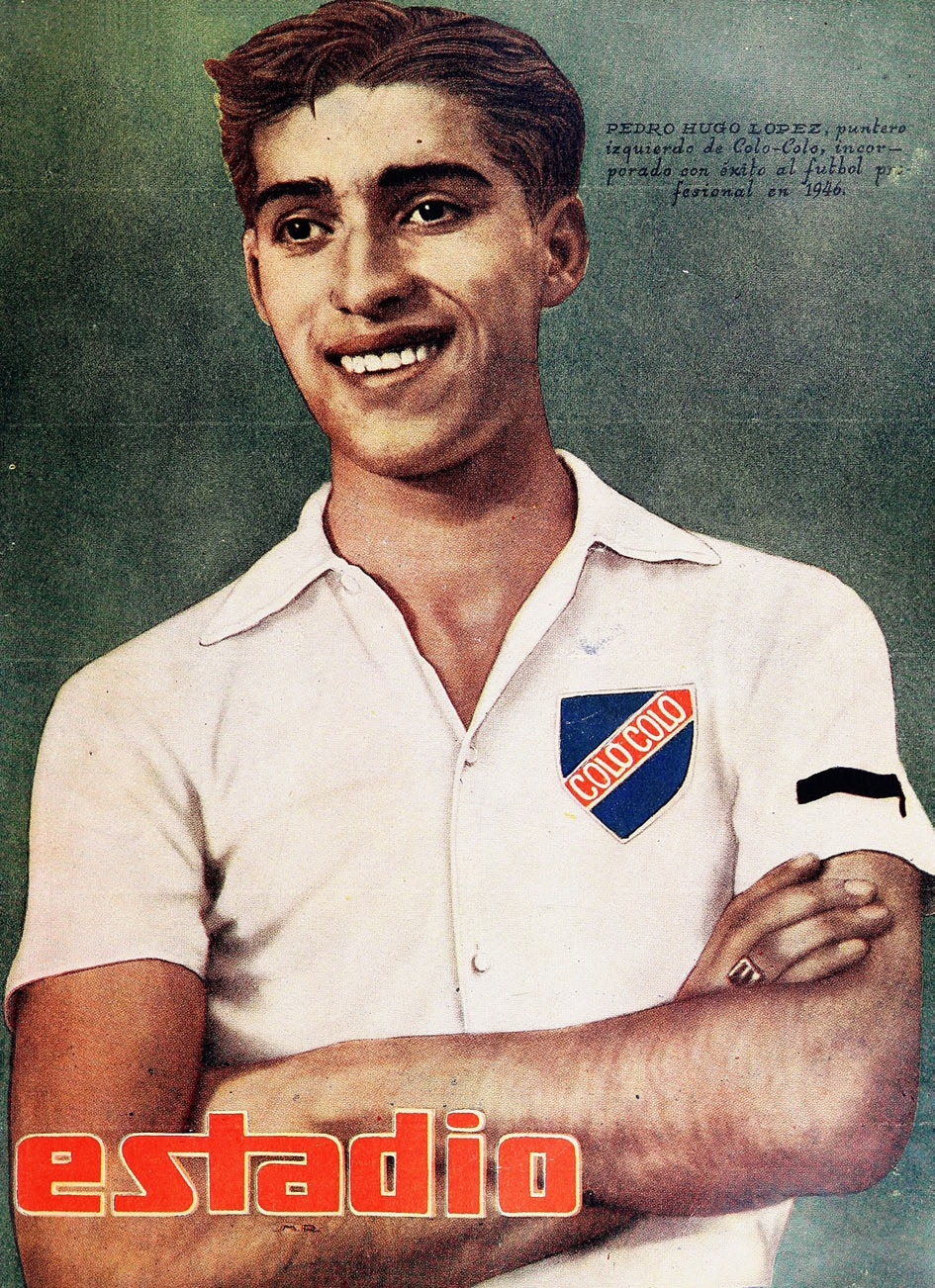

Personal information
- Date of birth: 25 October 1927
- Date of death: 26 October 1959 (aged 32)
- Position: Forward

International career
Years	Team	Apps	(Gls)
1952	Chile	2	(0)

Pedro Hugo López (25 October 1927 – 26 October 1959) was a Chilean footballer. He played in two matches for the Chile national football team in 1952. He was also part of Chile's squad for the 1949 South American Championship.
