= Jorge Alcalde =

Peruvian footballer (1916-1990)

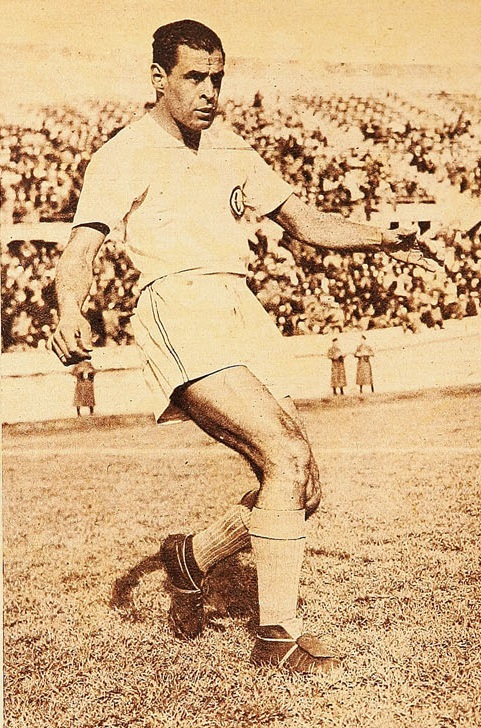

Personal information
- Full name: Jorge Luis Félix Alcalde Millos
- Date of birth: 5 December 1911
- Place of birth: Callao, Peru
- Date of death: 25 June 1990 (aged 78)
- Place of death: Lima, Peru
- Height: 1.80 m (5 ft 11 in)
- Position: Inside forward

Senior career*
| Years | Team | Apps | (Gls) |
| 1933–1938 | Sport Boys | 38 | (37) |
| 1939–1942 | River Plate | 49 | (18) |
| 1943–1945 | Banfield | 57 | (22) |
| 1945–1946 | Talleres (RE) | 21 | (9) |
| 1946 | Liverpool Montevideo | 16 | (8) |
| 1947 | Club Deportivo Municipal | 20 | (16) |
| 1948–1949 | Universitario | 37 | (28) |
| 1950 | Sport Boys | 15 | (9) |

International career
| 1935–1939 | Peru | 16 | (14) |
Medal record
Men's football
Representing Peru
South American Championship
| Winner | 1939 |
- * Club domestic league appearances and goals

Jorge Luis Félix "Campolo" Alcalde Millos (5 December 1911 – 25 June 1990) was a Peruvian professional footballer. He played as a striker, and was especially noted for his time spent with the Peru national football team. He was part of Peru's squad at the 1936 Summer Olympics.

== Biography ==
Alcalde was included in the Peru national football team for the Copa America 1939 that won. He was the second highest goal scorer with 5 goals. He made 16 appearances and scored 14 goals for the Peru national team. The Peruvian newspaper El Comercio and El Callao considered him the best soccer player of the Copa America 1939.

== Career statistics ==
=== International ===
Scores and results table. Peru's goal tally first:

List of international goals scored by Jorge Alcalde

| # | Date | Venue | Opponent | Score | Result | Competition |
|---|---|---|---|---|---|---|
| 1. | 8 August 1936 | Berlin, Germany | Austria | 1–2 | 4–2 a.e.t. | 1936 Summer Olympics |
| 2. | 21 June 1937 | Buenos Aires, Argentina | Chile | 1–0 | 2–2 | 1937 South American Championship |
| 3. | 21 June 1937 | Buenos Aires, Argentina | Chile | 2–0 | 2–2 | 1937 South American Championship |
| 4. | 8 August 1938 | Bogotá, Colombia | Colombia | 3–0 | 4–2 | 1938 Bolivarian Games |
| 5. | 11 August 1938 | Bogotá, Colombia | Ecuador | 3–1 | 9–1 | 1938 Bolivarian Games |
| 6. | 11 August 1938 | Bogotá, Colombia | Ecuador | 4–1 | 9–1 | 1938 Bolivarian Games |
| 7. | 11 August 1938 | Bogotá, Colombia | Ecuador | 6–1 | 9–1 | 1938 Bolivarian Games |
| 8. | 11 August 1938 | Bogotá, Colombia | Ecuador | 9–1 | 9–1 | 1938 Bolivarian Games |
| 9. | 14 August 1938 | Bogotá, Colombia | Bolivia | 2–0 | 3–0 | 1938 Bolivarian Games |
| 10. | 15 January 1939 | Lima, Peru | Ecuador | 2–0 | 5–2 | 1939 South American Championship |
| 11. | 15 January 1939 | Lima, Peru | Ecuador | 4–0 | 5–2 | 1939 South American Championship |
| 12. | 22 January 1939 | Lima, Peru | Chile | 3–1 | 3–1 | 1939 South American Championship |
| 13. | 29 January 1939 | Lima, Peru | Paraguay | 3–0 | 3–0 | 1939 South American Championship |
| 14. | 12 February 1939 | Lima, Peru | Uruguay | 1–0 | 2–1 | 1939 South American Championship |

== Honors ==
=== Team ===
| Season | Team | Title |
|---|---|---|
| 1935 | Sport Boys | Peruvian League |
| 1937 | Sport Boys | Peruvian League |
| 1938 | Peru National Team | Bolivarian Games |
| 1939 | Peru National Team | Copa América |
| 1941 | River Plate | Primera División Argentina |
| 1942 | River Plate | Primera División Argentina |
| 1949 | Universitario | Peruvian League |

=== Individual awards ===
- Peruvian League: Top Scorer 1935, 1938
- Bolivarian Games Top Scorer: 1938
