= Enrique Sorrel =

Chilean footballer and manager (1912-1991)

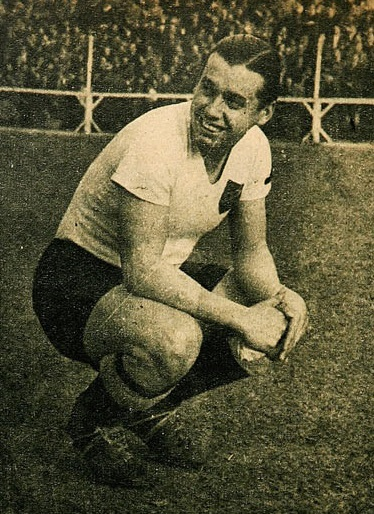

Personal information
- Full name: Enrique Sorrel Contreras
- Date of birth: 3 February 1912
- Place of birth: Linares, Chile
- Date of death: 20 October 1991 (aged 79)
- Place of death: Santiago, Chile
- Height: 1.72 m (5 ft 7 1/2 in)
- Position: Midfielder

Senior career*
Years	Team	Apps	(Gls)
1929–1933	Audax Italiano	108	(24)
1934–1945	Colo-Colo	119	(86)

International career^{‡}
1935–1941	Chile	10	(5)

Managerial career
- 1947–1950: Colo-Colo
- 1955: San Luis Quillota
- 1959–1960: Audax Italiano
- * Club domestic league appearances and goals as of 29 August 2015 ‡ National team caps and goals as of 29 August 2015

Enrique Sorrel Contreras (3 February 1912 – 26 October 1991) was a Chilean footballer and manager.

He won two unbeaten titles with Colo-Colo as player (1937 and 1941) and was decorated by Chilean president Pedro Aguirre Cerda, recognizing his services as a national team player during the 1939 South American Championship at Lima with a medal for the merit.

== Honours ==
=== Club ===
==== Player ====
Colo-Colo

- Primera División de Chile (4): 1937, 1939, 1941, 1947
- Copa Chile (2): 1938, 1940

=== Club ===
Colo-Colo

- Primera División de Chile: 1947

San Luis Quillota

- Primera División de Chile: 1955
