= José Avendaño =

Chilean footballer (1912–1968)

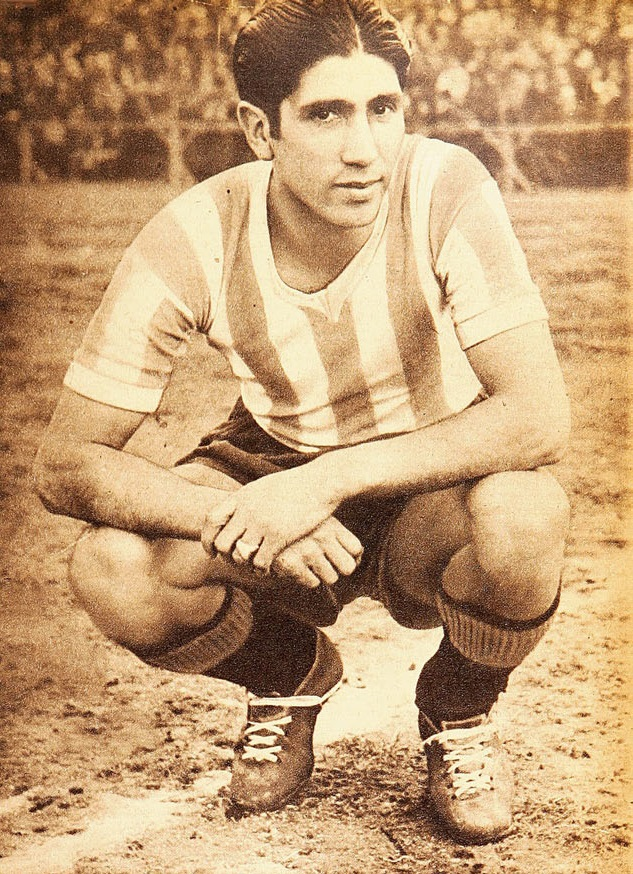
- José Avendaño in 1942

Personal information
- Full name: José Doroteo Avendaño Avendaño
- Date of birth: 12 February 1912
- Place of birth: Talcahuano, Chile
- Date of death: 27 September 1968
- Position: Forward

Youth career
- El Torbellino
- Brasil
- Real Zúñiga
- Gente De Mar

Senior career*
| Years | Team | Apps | (Gls) |
| 1929 | Gente de Mar | | |
| 1930 | Deportivo Naval | | |
| 1931 | Talcahuano-Concepción (city team) | | |
| 1933–1945 | Magallanes | | |

International career
| 1935–1939 | Chile | 11 | (3) |
- * Club domestic league appearances and goals

José Doroteo Avendaño Avendaño (8 February 1912 – 27 September 1968) was a Chilean footballer. He played in 11 matches for the Chile national football team from 1935 to 1939, scoring 3 goals. He was also part of Chile's squad for the 1935 South American Championship.

== Personal life ==
He was nicknamed Chorero (worker in mussel farming) due to his hometown.
