= 1937 Peruvian Primera División =

Peruvian Primera División
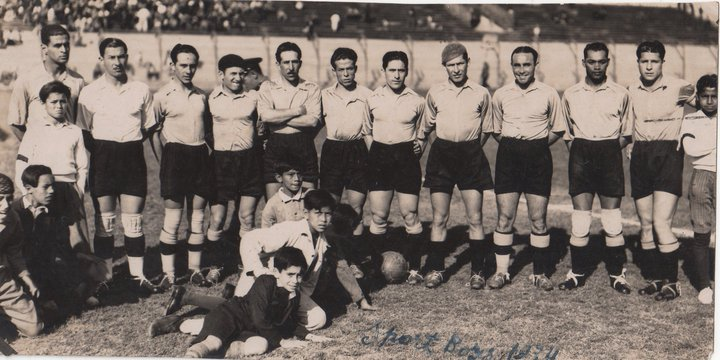
- Sport Boys, champion
- Season: 1937
- Dates: 30 May 1937 – 12 September 1937
- Champions: Sport Boys (2nd title)
- Runner up: Alianza Lima
- Relegated: Telmo Carbajo; Sportivo Melgar; Sportivo Tarapacá
- Matches: 45
- Goals: 167 (3.71 per match)
- Top goalscorer: Juan Flores (10 goals)

The 1937 season of the Peruvian Primera División, the top category of Peruvian football, was played by 10 teams. The national champions were Sport Boys.

The whole tournament was played in two stadiums:

Stadium	City
National Stadium	Lima
Estadio Modelo de Bellavista	Callao

== Format ==
- In this season, the results of a reserve teams league were added as bonus points.
- From 1931 until 1942 the points system was W:3, D:2, L:1, walkover:0.

== Teams ==
=== Team changes ===
Promoted from 1935 Primera B	Promoted from 1935 Liga Provincial del Callao	Promoted from 1936 Primera División Unificada
▲ Sporting Tabaco (1st)	▲ Atlético Chalaco (1st) ▲ Telmo Carbajo (2nd)	▲ Deportivo Municipal (1st) ▲ Sportivo Melgar (2nd)

=== Stadia and Locations ===
Team	City
Alianza Lima	La Victoria, Lima
Atlético Chalaco	Callao
Deportivo Municipal	Cercado de Lima
Sport Boys	Callao
Sporting Tabaco	Rímac, Lima
Sportivo Melgar	Barrios Altos
Sportivo Tarapacá Ferrocarril	Cercado de Lima
Sucre	La Victoria, Lima
Telmo Carbajo	Callao
Universitario	Cercado de Lima

== Torneo Primeros Equipos ==
=== Standings ===
Pos	Team	Pld	W	D	L	GF	GA	GD	Pts	Qualification
1	Sport Boys	9	7	2	0	26	11	+15	25	Champions
2	Alianza Lima	9	5	2	2	21	11	+10	21	
3	Universitario	9	5	1	3	21	22	−1	20	
4	Atlético Chalaco	9	4	2	3	16	18	−2	19	
5	Deportivo Municipal	9	3	3	3	15	8	+7	18	
6	Sucre	9	4	0	5	21	20	+1	17	
7	Sporting Tabaco	9	3	2	4	10	11	−1	17	
8	Telmo Carbajo	9	3	2	4	10	15	−5	17	
9	Sportivo Melgar	9	3	1	5	21	27	−6	16	
10	Sportivo Tarapacá Ferrocarril	9	0	1	8	6	24	−18	10	

== Results ==
Teams play each other once, either home or away. All matches were played in Lima.

Home \ Away	ALI	CHA	MUN	SBA	TAB	MEL	TAR	SUC	TEL	UNI
Alianza Lima		4–0	0–0		1–3	6–3		3–2		
Atlético Chalaco				3–3		1–0	2–0		0–0	
Deportivo Municipal		4–1			1–1			0–2		6–0
Sport Boys	1–1		1–0			4–2		4–2	3–0	
Sporting Tabaco		2–4		1–2		0–1	1–1			0–1
Sportivo Melgar			1–1				5–2	2–7		3–5
Sportivo Tarapacá Ferrocarril	0–3		0–2	1–4					0–2	
Sucre		3–2			0–1		2–0		2–3	
Telmo Carbajo	0–2		2–1		0–1	1–4				
Universitario	2–1	2–3		1–4			3–2	5–1	2–2	

Updated to match(es) played on 1937. Source: Diario El Comercio, La Prensa and Crónica.
Legend: Blue = home team win; Yellow = draw; Red = away team win.

== Tabla Absoluta ==
Pos	Team	Pld	W	D	L	GF	GA	GD	Pts	Resv.	Total	Qualification or relegation
1	Sport Boys (C)	9	7	2	0	26	11	+15	25	2.625	27.625	Champions
2	Alianza Lima	9	5	2	2	21	11	+10	21	3.125	24.125	
3	Universitario	9	5	1	3	21	22	−1	20	3.5	23.5	
4	Deportivo Municipal	9	3	3	3	15	8	+7	18	3.75	21.75	
5	Atlético Chalaco	9	4	2	3	16	18	−2	19	2.625	21.625	
6	Sucre	9	4	0	5	21	20	+1	17	2.5	19.5	
7	Sporting Tabaco	9	3	2	4	10	11	−1	17	2.5	19.5	
8	Telmo Carbajo (R)	9	3	2	4	10	15	−5	17	2	19	1938 Liga Provincial del Callao
9	Sportivo Melgar (R)	9	3	1	5	21	27	−6	16	3	19	1938 Liga Provincial de Lima
10	Sportivo Tarapacá Ferrocarril (R)	9	0	1	8	6	24	−18	10	1.375	11.375	1938 Liga Provincial de Lima

== See also ==
- 1937 Ligas Provinciales de Lima y Callao
