= Raúl Muñoz (footballer, born 1919) =

Chilean footballer

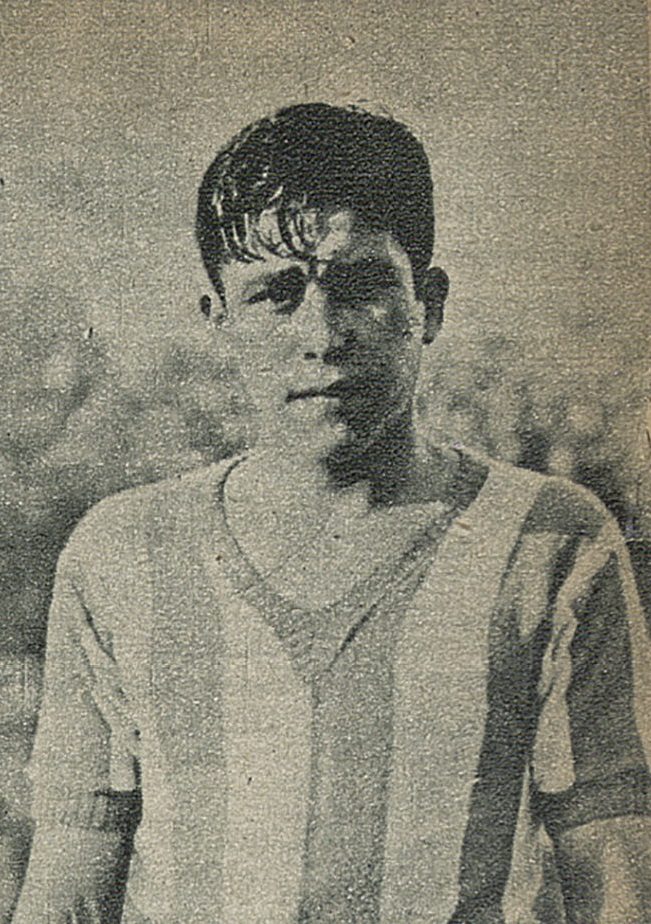

Personal information
- Date of birth: 28 April 1919
- Date of death: 3 October 1959 (aged 40)
- Position: Forward

International career
Years	Team	Apps	(Gls)
1939	Chile	4	(1)

Raúl Muñoz (28 April 1919 – 3 October 1959) was a Chilean footballer. He played in four matches for the Chile national football team in 1939. He was also part of Chile's squad for the 1939 South American Championship.
