= 1939 South American Championship =

Football tournament

Tournament details
- Host country: Peru
- Dates: 15 January – 12 February 1939
- Teams: 5
- Venue(s): Estadio Nacional, Lima

Final positions
- Champions: Peru (1st title)
- Runners-up: Uruguay
- Third place: Paraguay
- Fourth place: Chile

Tournament statistics
- Matches played: 10
- Goals scored: 47 (4.7 per match)
- Top scorer: (Peru) Teodoro Fernández (7 goals)
- Best player: (Peru) Teodoro Fernández

The 1939 South American Championship (Spanish: Campeonato Sudamericano 1939) was the 15th international association football championship for members of the Confederación Sudamericana de Fútbol (CONMEBOL). Hosted by Peru, the competition ran from 15 January – 12 February 1939 and was contested by the national teams of Chile, Ecuador, Paraguay, Peru and Uruguay.

Hosts Peru won the title for the first time after defeating Uruguay 2–1 in the final and decisive match of the round-robin tournament.

== Background ==
In 1910, the Asociación del Fútbol Argentino (AFA) organised a tournament to mark the 100th anniversary of the May Revolution. The Copa Centenario Revolución de Mayo was contested by the national teams of Argentina, Chile and Uruguay and is considered to be a precursor to the South American Championship. Six years later, the AFA organised a second tournament, this time to celebrate the centenary of the Argentine Declaration of Independence. Alongside the three who had contested the Copa Centenario Revolución de Mayo, Brazil were invited to compete and the South American Championship was born. During the competition, the four associations of the competing teams met on 9 July 1916 and founded the Confederación Sudamericana de Fútbol (CONMEBOL).

Argentina were the defending champions having won the 1937 edition after defeating Brazil 2–1 in the championship play-off. Uruguay were the most successful team in the history of the competition having won the trophy on seven occasions.

Three teams – Argentina, Bolivia and Brazil – withdrew prior to the start of the competition so only five of the eight CONMEBOL members would compete. As a result, Argentina would be unable to defend their title.

== Format ==
The tournament was played as a round-robin where each team would play all of the others once. The winner would be decided by the total number of points obtained across all matches played.

=== Participants ===
- Chile
- Ecuador
- Paraguay
- Peru
- Uruguay

== Venue ==
All matches were held at the Estadio Nacional in Lima.

Lima
Estadio Nacional
Capacity: 40,000
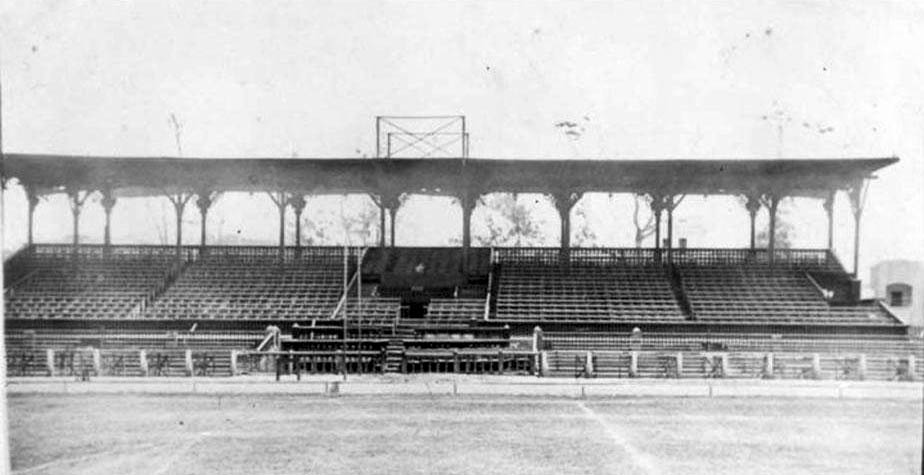

== Summary ==
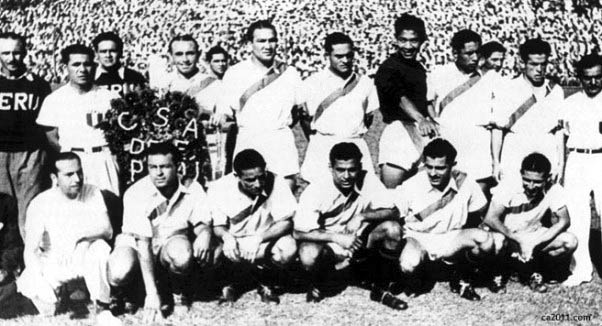
The Peruvian team that won its first title

The competition began on 15 January when Paraguay defeated Chile 5–1 and Peru won 5–2 against Ecuador. A week later, a hat-trick from Severino Varela helped Uruguay to a 6–0 win against Ecuador and Peru defeated Chile 3-1. On 29 January, Uruguay came from behind to defeat Chile 3–2 and Peru defeated Paraguay 3–0. With just four matches left to play, Peru were at the top of the table with six points from six, two ahead of Uruguay who had played a game less.

A week later, Chile defeated Ecuador 4–1 and Uruguay defeated Paraguay 3–1 to leave them tied on points with Peru and the two teams were scheduled to meet in the final match. The last two matches took place on 12 February when Paraguay defeated Ecuador 3–1 and goals from Jorge Alcalde and Víctor Bielich helped Peru to a 2–1 win against Uruguay as they won the competition for the first time.

== Table ==
Pos	Team	Pld	W	D	L	GF	GA	GD	Pts
1	Peru	4	4	0	0	13	4	+9	8
2	Uruguay	4	3	0	1	13	5	+8	6
3	Paraguay	4	2	0	2	9	8	+1	4
4	Chile	4	1	0	3	8	12	−4	2
5	Ecuador	4	0	0	4	4	18	−14	0

== Results ==
15 January 1939

Paraguay	5–1	Chile
Godoy 10', 24'; Barrios 47', 75'; Aquino 88'		Sorrel 8'

Estadio Nacional, Lima
Referee: Alberto March (Ecuador)
15 January 1939

Peru	5–2	Ecuador
T. Fernández 6', 34', 77'; J. Alcalde 16', 58'		Alcívar 55', 89'

Estadio Nacional, Lima
Referee: Carlos Puyol (Uruguay)

22 January 1939

Uruguay	6–0	Ecuador
Porta 22'; S. Varela 53', 55', 81'; Lago 65', 70'

Estadio Nacional, Lima
Referee: Enrique Cuenca (Peru)
22 January 1939

Peru	3–1	Chile
T. Fernández 46', 65' (pen.); J. Alcalde 80'		Domínguez 55'

Estadio Nacional, Lima
Referee: Carlos Puyol (Uruguay)

29 January 1939

Uruguay	3–2	Chile
S. Varela 11'; Camaití 30'; Chirimini 73'		Muñoz 3'; Luco 39'

Estadio Nacional, Lima
Referee: Enrique Cuenca (Peru)
29 January 1939

Peru	3–0	Paraguay
T. Fernández 11', 30'; J. Alcalde 78'

Estadio Nacional, Lima
Referee: Alfredo Vargas (Chile)

5 February 1939

Chile	4–1	Ecuador
Toro 6'; Avendaño 15', 79'; Sorrel 19' (pen.)		Arenas 35'

Estadio Nacional, Lima
Referee: Carlos Puyol (Uruguay)
5 February 1939

Uruguay	3–1	Paraguay
Lago 14'; S. Varela 40' (pen.); Porta 66'		Barrios 59'

Estadio Nacional, Lima
Referee: Enrique Cuenca (Peru)

12 February 1939

Paraguay	3–1	Ecuador
Mingo 4'; Godoy 61'; Barreiro 63'		Arenas 75'

Estadio Nacional, Lima
Referee: Enrique Cuenca (Peru)
12 February 1939

Peru	2–1	Uruguay
J. Alcalde 7'; Bielich 35'		Porta 44'

Estadio Nacional, Lima
Referee: Alfredo Vargas (Chile)

== Goalscorers ==
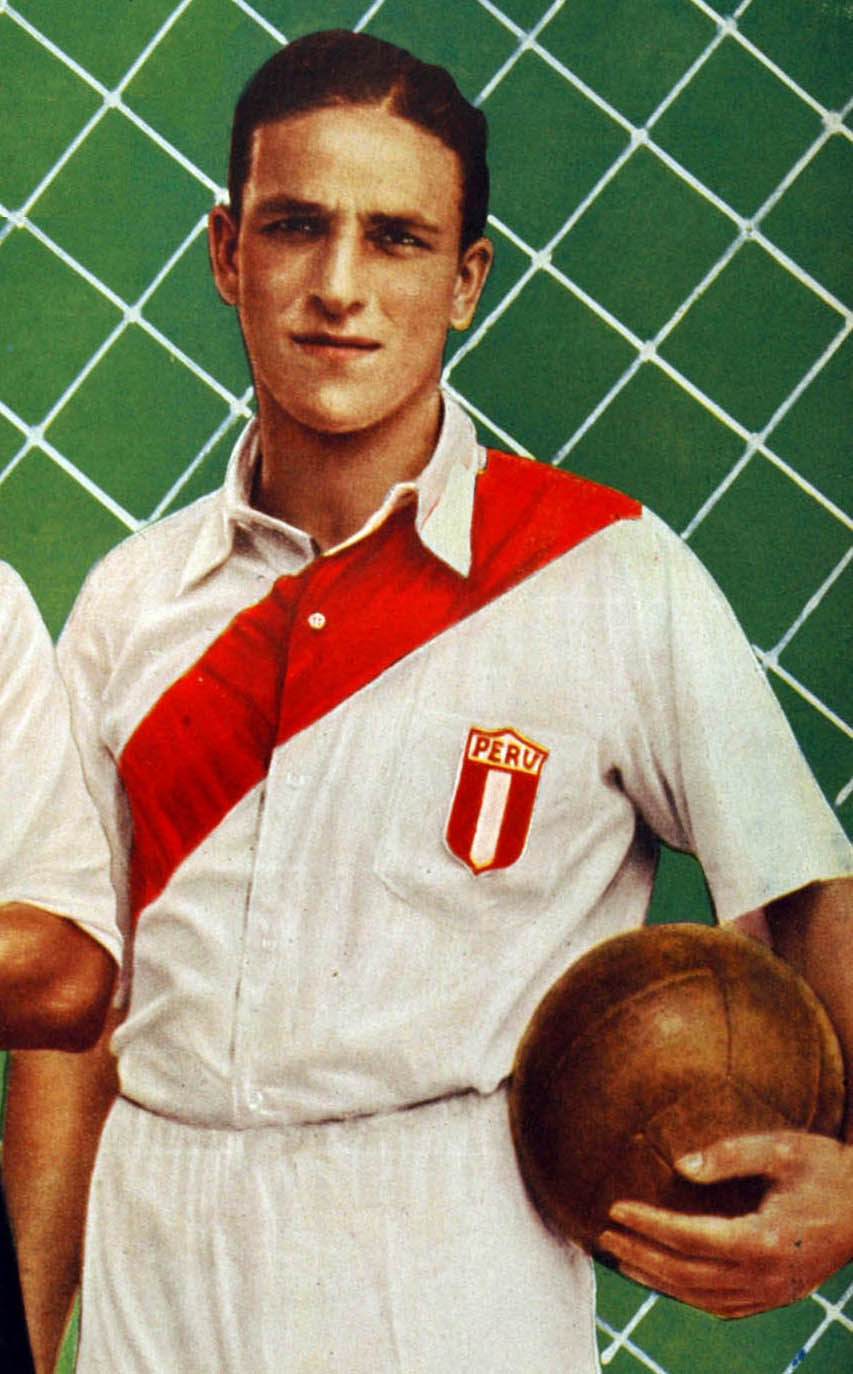
Teodoro Fernández, top scorer

There were 47 goals scored in 10 matches, for an average of 4.7 goals per match.

7 goals

- (Peru) Teodoro Fernández

5 goals

- (Peru) Jorge Alcalde
- (Uruguay) Severino Varela

3 goals

- (Paraguay) Tiberio Godoy
- (Paraguay) Marcial Barrios
- (Uruguay) Pedro Lago
- (Uruguay) Roberto Porta

2 goals

- (Chile) José Avendaño
- (Chile) Enrique Sorrel
- (Ecuador) Marino Alcívar
- (Ecuador) Manuel Arenas

1 goal

- (Chile) Alfonso Domínguez
- (Chile) Roberto Luco
- (Chile) Raúl Muñoz
- (Chile) Raúl Toro
- (Paraguay) Ricardo Aquino
- (Paraguay) Eustaquio Barreiro
- (Paraguay) Eduardo Mingo
- (Peru) Víctor Bielich
- (Uruguay) Adelaido Camaití
- (Uruguay) Oscar Chirimini
