= 1942 South American Championship squads =

List of footballers

The following squads were named for the 1942 South American Championship that took place in Uruguay.

== Argentina ==
Head coach: Guillermo Stábile

No.	Pos.	Player	Date of birth (age)	Caps	Goals	Club
	GK	Sebastián Gualco	26 April 1912 (aged 29)	12	0	(Argentine Football Association) Ferro Carril Oeste
	DF	Jorge Alberti	18 May 1912 (aged 29)	13	0	(Argentine Football Association) Huracán
	DF	Héctor Blotto		4	0	(Argentine Football Association) Estudiantes (LP)
	DF	Oscar Montañés	14 August 1912 (aged 29)	12	0	(Argentine Football Association) Gimnasia y Esgrima (LP)
	DF	José Salomón	9 July 1916 (aged 25)	16	0	(Argentine Football Association) Racing Club
	DF	Víctor Valussi	8 May 1912 (aged 29)	6	0	(Argentine Football Association) Boca Juniors
	MF	Gregorio Juan Esperón	15 February 1917 (aged 24)	5	1	(Argentine Football Association) Platense
	MF	Juan Silvano Ferreyra		0	0	(Argentine Football Association) Newell's Old Boys
	MF	Ángel Perucca	19 August 1919 (aged 22)	4	0	(Argentine Football Association) Newell's Old Boys
	MF	José Ramos	13 November 1918 (aged 23)	0	0	(Argentine Football Association) River Plate
	MF	Enrique García	12 November 1912 (aged 29)	27	7	(Argentine Football Association) Racing Club
	MF	Raimundo Sandoval		0	0	(Argentine Football Association) Tigre
	MF	Eusebio Videla	19 August 1914 (aged 27)	5	0	(Argentine Football Association) Tigre
	FW	Juan Carlos Heredia	27 April 1922 (aged 19)	1	0	(Argentine Football Association) Rosario Central
	FW	Ángel Laferrara	27 March 1917 (aged 24)	4	5	(Argentine Football Association) Estudiantes (LP)
	FW	Herminio Masantonio	5 August 1910 (aged 31)	14	14	(Argentine Football Association) Huracán
	FW	José Manuel Moreno	3 August 1916 (aged 25)	18	9	(Argentine Football Association) River Plate
	FW	Adolfo Alfredo Pedernera	15 November 1918 (aged 23)	8	1	(Argentine Football Association) River Plate
	FW	Mario Tossoni	30 November 1918 (aged 23)	0	0	(Argentine Football Association) Tigre

== Brazil ==
Head coach: Adhemar Pimenta

No.	Pos.	Player	Date of birth (age)	Caps	Goals	Club
	GK	Aymoré Moreira	24 April 1912 (aged 29)	3	0	(Brazilian Football Confederation) Botafogo
	GK	Caju	14 January 1915 (aged 26)	0	0	(Brazilian Football Confederation) Athletico Paranaense
	DF	Begliomini	27 November 1914 (aged 27)	0	0	(Brazilian Football Confederation) Palestra Itália
	DF	Domingos	19 November 1912 (aged 29)	8	0	(Brazilian Football Confederation) Flamengo
	DF	Norival	5 June 1917 (aged 24)	4	0	(Brazilian Football Confederation) Fluminense
	DF	Osvaldo Gerico	1 May 1914 (aged 27)	0	0	(Brazilian Football Confederation) Vasco da Gama
	MF	Afonsinho	8 March 1914 (aged 27)	13	1	(Brazilian Football Confederation) Fluminense
	MF	Argemiro	3 June 1915 (aged 26)	7	0	(Brazilian Football Confederation) Vasco da Gama
	MF	Brandão	21 April 1911 (aged 30)	11	0	(Brazilian Football Confederation) Corinthians
	MF	Dino	5 April 1915 (aged 26)	0	0	(Brazilian Football Confederation) Corinthians
	MF	Jaime	28 August 1920 (aged 21)	0	0	(Brazilian Football Confederation) Flamengo
	MF	Tim	20 February 1915 (aged 26)	10	0	(Brazilian Football Confederation) Fluminense
	MF	Zizinho	14 September 1921 (aged 20)	0	0	(Brazilian Football Confederation) Flamengo
	FW	Cláudio Pinho	18 July 1922 (aged 19)	0	0	(Brazilian Football Confederation) Palestra Itália
	FW	Joanino	7 June 1912 (aged 29)	0	0	(Brazilian Football Confederation) Athletico Paranaense
	FW	Patesko	12 November 1910 (aged 31)	12	4	(Brazilian Football Confederation) Botafogo
	FW	Paulo Flôrencio	26 June 1918 (aged 23)	0	0	(Brazilian Football Confederation) Siderúrgica
	FW	Pedro Amorim	13 October 1919 (aged 22)	2	1	(Brazilian Football Confederation) Fluminense
	FW	Pipi	10 December 1915 (aged 26)	0	0	(Brazilian Football Confederation) Palestra Itália
	FW	Russo	26 July 1915 (aged 26)	0	0	(Brazilian Football Confederation) Fluminense
	FW	Servílio de Jesús	15 April 1915 (aged 26)	0	0	(Brazilian Football Confederation) Corinthians
	FW	Sylvio Pirillo	26 July 1916 (aged 25)	0	0	(Brazilian Football Confederation) Flamengo

== Chile ==
Head coach: (Hungary) Ferenc Plattkó

No.	Pos.	Player	Date of birth (age)	Caps	Goals	Club
	GK	Hernán Fernández	17 March 1921 (aged 20)	0	0	(Football Federation of Chile) Unión Española
	GK	Mario Ibáñez	27 July 1921 (aged 20)	0	0	(Football Federation of Chile) Universidad de Chile
	GK	Sergio Livingstone	26 March 1920 (aged 21)	4	0	(Football Federation of Chile) Universidad Católica
	DF	Roberto Cabrera	2 January 1914 (aged 28)	4	0	(Football Federation of Chile) Audax Italiano
	DF	Humberto Roa	21 February 1912 (aged 29)	5	0	(Football Federation of Chile) Audax Italiano
	DF	Santiago Salfate	16 January 1912 (aged 29)	0	0	(Football Federation of Chile) Colo-Colo
	MF	Florencio Barrera	6 June 1915 (aged 26)	0	0	(Football Federation of Chile) Magallanes
	MF	Armando Contreras	1 June 1918 (aged 23)	2	1	(Football Federation of Chile) Colo-Colo
	MF	Francisco Las Heras	3 July 1914 (aged 27)	0	0	(Football Federation of Chile) Universidad de Chile
	MF	Óscar Medina	21 May 1917 (aged 24)	0	0	(Football Federation of Chile) Colo-Colo
	MF	José Pastenes	10 July 1915 (aged 26)	2	0	(Football Federation of Chile) Colo-Colo
	FW	Carlos Arancibia	16 July 1911 (aged 30)	0	0	(Football Federation of Chile) Green Cross
	FW	Manuel Arancibia	25 May 1908 (aged 33)	4	2	(Football Federation of Chile) Green Cross
	FW	Benito Armingol	7 September 1919 (aged 22)	0	0	(Football Federation of Chile) Unión Española
	FW	Guillermo Casanova	21 May 1918 (aged 23)	0	0	(Football Federation of Chile) Santiago Morning
	FW	Alfonso Domínguez	18 December 1916 (aged 25)	6	1	(Football Federation of Chile) Colo-Colo
	FW	Raúl Pérez	21 June 1915 (aged 26)	3	2	(Football Federation of Chile) River Plate de Valdivia
	FW	Fernando Riera	27 June 1920 (aged 21)	0	0	(Football Federation of Chile) Universidad Católica
	FW	Guillermo Torres	21 September 1909 (aged 32)	5	1	(Football Federation of Chile) Santiago Wanderers

== Ecuador ==
Head coach: (Argentina) Juan Parodi

No.	Pos.	Player	Date of birth (age)	Caps	Goals	Club
	GK	Napoleón Medina	26 November 1919 (aged 22)	0	0	(Ecuadorian Football Federation) Italia Guayaquil
	GK	Humberto Vásquez		3	0	(Ecuadorian Football Federation)
	DF	Luis Hungria	25 August 1915 (aged 26)	5	0	(Ecuadorian Football Federation)
	DF	Romualdo Ronquillo	23 March 1910 (aged 31)	0	0	(Ecuadorian Football Federation) LDU Quito
	DF	Félix Leyton Zurita		0	0	(Ecuadorian Football Federation)
	MF	Vicente Aguirre		1	0	(Ecuadorian Football Federation)
	MF	Jorge Laurido		5	0	(Ecuadorian Football Federation)
	MF	Luis Antonio Mendoza	25 May 1914 (aged 27)	4	0	(Ecuadorian Football Federation)
	MF	José Merino	15 April 1915 (aged 26)	4	0	(Ecuadorian Football Federation)
	MF	José Peralta		7	0	(Ecuadorian Football Federation)
	MF	Manuel Sempértegui	20 November 1916 (aged 25)	0	0	(Ecuadorian Football Federation)
	MF	Celso Torres		0	0	(Ecuadorian Football Federation)
	MF	Arturo Zambrano		2	0	(Ecuadorian Football Federation)
	FW	Antonio Abril	23 April 1910 (aged 31)	0	0	(Ecuadorian Football Federation)
	FW	Pedro Acevedo	25 June 1915 (aged 26)	0	0	(Ecuadorian Football Federation)
	FW	Marino Alcívar	21 May 1916 (aged 25)	8	2	(Ecuadorian Football Federation) Emelec
	FW	Enrique Álvarez	18 October 1920 (aged 21)	0	0	(Ecuadorian Football Federation) 9 de Octubre
	FW	Ernesto Cevallos		8	0	(Ecuadorian Football Federation)
	FW	Guillermo Gavilánez		0	0	(Ecuadorian Football Federation)
	FW	José Herrera	15 June 1907 (aged 34)	1	0	(Ecuadorian Football Federation)
	FW	José María Jiménez	22 July 1921 (aged 20)	0	0	(Ecuadorian Football Federation)
	FW	José Luis Mendoza	25 August 1914 (aged 27)	0	0	(Ecuadorian Football Federation)

== Paraguay ==
Head coach: Manuel Fleitas Solich

No.	Pos.	Player	Date of birth (age)	Caps	Goals	Club
	GK	Isidro Alonso		0	0	(Paraguayan Football Association)
	GK	Dionisio Ríos		0	0	(Paraguayan Football Association) Club Nacional
	DF	Avelino Acosta	10 November 1917 (aged 24)	0	0	(Paraguayan Football Association)
	DF	Domingo Benítez		0	0	(Paraguayan Football Association)
	DF	Martín Carballo		0	0	(Paraguayan Football Association)
	MF	Julián Benegas		0	0	(Paraguayan Football Association)
	MF	Isidro Escobar		0	0	(Paraguayan Football Association)
	MF	Eulalio Granje		0	0	(Paraguayan Football Association)
	MF	Miguel Ortega	5 July 1917 (aged 24)	9	0	(Brazilian Football Confederation) Ypiranga-RS
	FW	Ruben Aveiro	18 November 1919 (aged 22)	0	0	(Paraguayan Football Association)
	FW	Marcial Barrios	26 June 1919 (aged 22)	5	2	(Argentine Football Association) Unión de Santa Fe
	FW	Fabio Pascual Baudo Franco		0	0	(Paraguayan Football Association) Club Nacional
	FW	Castor Cantero	12 January 1918 (aged 23)	0	0	(Paraguayan Football Association) Olimpia
	FW	José Ibáñez		5	0	(Paraguayan Football Association)
	FW	Gorgonio Ibarrola		0	0	(Paraguayan Football Association)
	FW	Tranquilino Mello	14 March 1922 (aged 19)	0	0	(Paraguayan Football Association)
	FW	Eduardo Mingo		4	2	(Paraguayan Football Association)
	FW	Ignacio Romero		0	0	(Paraguayan Football Association)
	FW	Lorenzo Romero		2	0	(Paraguayan Football Association)
	FW	Vicente Sánchez		0	0	(Paraguayan Football Association) Club Nacional
	FW	Sabino Villalba		0	0	(Paraguayan Football Association) Club Nacional

== Peru ==
Head coach: Ángel Fernández Roca

No.	Pos.	Player	Date of birth (age)	Caps	Goals	Club
	GK	Juan Honores	4 March 1915 (aged 26)	11	0	(Argentine Football Association) Newell's Old Boys
	GK	Jose Soriano	19 April 1917 (aged 24)	0	0	(Peruvian Football Federation) Alfonso Ugarte
	DF	Orestes Jordán	21 November 1913 (aged 28)	7	0	(Peruvian Football Federation) Universitario de Deportes
	DF	Pedro Luna		1	0	(Peruvian Football Federation)
	DF	Tulio Obando	6 January 1913 (aged 29)	0	0	(Peruvian Football Federation) Universitario de Deportes
	DF	Enrique Perales	18 January 1914 (aged 27)	4	0	(Peruvian Football Federation) Deportivo Municipal
	DF	Carlos Portal	11 April 1911 (aged 30)	4	0	(Peruvian Football Federation) Atlético Chalaco
	DF	Juan Quispe	18 July 1914 (aged 27)	5	0	(Peruvian Football Federation) Alianza Lima
	MF	Alfredo Biffi	27 February 1916 (aged 25)	0	0	(Peruvian Football Federation) Universitario de Deportes
	MF	Teobaldo Guzmán	29 October 1918 (aged 23)	0	0	(Argentine Football Association) Banfield
	MF	Máximo Lobatón	13 August 1914 (aged 27)	4	0	(Peruvian Football Federation) Alianza Lima
	MF	Pedro Magán		2	0	(Peruvian Football Federation)
	MF	Pablo Pasache	1 February 1915 (aged 26)	0	0	(Football Federation of Chile) Magallanes
	FW	Armando Agurto	13 November 1927 (aged 14)	0	0	(Peruvian Football Federation) Sport Boys
	FW	Alberto Delgado		0	0	(Peruvian Football Federation)
	FW	Teodoro Fernández	20 May 1913 (aged 28)	21	22	(Peruvian Football Federation) Universitario de Deportes
	FW	Luis Guzmán	2 September 1918 (aged 23)	0	0	(Peruvian Football Federation) Deportivo Municipal
	FW	Marcial Hurtado	30 June 1919 (aged 22)	2	0	(Peruvian Football Federation) Sport Boys
	FW	Adelfo Magallanes	29 August 1910 (aged 31)	12	1	(Peruvian Football Federation) Alianza Lima
	FW	Roberto Morales	11 January 1921 (aged 20)	0	0	(Peruvian Football Federation) Sporting Tabaco
	FW	Leopoldo Quiñónez		3	0	(Peruvian Football Federation) Deportivo Municipal
	FW	Antonio Zegarra		0	0	(Peruvian Football Federation)

== Uruguay ==
Head coach: Pedro Cea

No.	Pos.	Player	Date of birth (age)	Caps	Goals	Club
	GK	Aníbal Paz	18 February 1918 (aged 23)	6	0	(Uruguayan Football Association) Nacional
	GK	Flavio Pereyra Nattero	2 March 1920 (aged 21)	0	0	(Uruguayan Football Association) Sud América
	DF	Secundino Arrascaeta	1 January 1915 (aged 27)	0	0	(Uruguayan Football Association) Rampla Juniors
	DF	Blas Bas		0	0	(Uruguayan Football Association) Racing de Montevideo
	DF	Joaquín Bermúdez	20 October 1919 (aged 22)	0	0	(Uruguayan Football Association) Peñarol
	DF	Agenor Muñiz	2 February 1910 (aged 31)	18	1	(Uruguayan Football Association) Peñarol
	DF	Héctor Romero		3	0	(Uruguayan Football Association) Nacional
	MF	Eugenio Galvalisi	15 November 1915 (aged 26)	10	0	(Uruguayan Football Association) Nacional
	MF	Schubert Gambetta	14 April 1920 (aged 21)	4	1	(Uruguayan Football Association) Nacional
	MF	Sixto González	30 December 1915 (aged 26)	3	0	(Uruguayan Football Association) Liverpool
	MF	Luis Pérez Luz	5 July 1917 (aged 24)	0	0	(Uruguayan Football Association) Nacional
	MF	Raúl Rodríguez		0	2	(Uruguayan Football Association) Peñarol
	MF	Obdulio Varela	20 September 1917 (aged 24)	4	1	(Uruguayan Football Association) Montevideo Wanderers
	FW	Antonio Álvarez		1	0	(Uruguayan Football Association) Racing de Montevideo
	FW	Enrique Castro	4 October 1918 (aged 23)	0	0	(Uruguayan Football Association) Nacional
	FW	Luis Castro	31 July 1921 (aged 20)	0	0	(Uruguayan Football Association) Nacional
	FW	Oscar Chirimini	28 March 1917 (aged 24)	9	2	(Uruguayan Football Association) Peñarol
	FW	Aníbal Ciocca	23 July 1915 (aged 26)	13	4	(Uruguayan Football Association) Nacional
	FW	José María Correa		0	0	(Uruguayan Football Association) Sud América
	FW	Hector Magliano	30 November 1919 (aged 22)	5	0	(Uruguayan Football Association) Montevideo Wanderers
	FW	Roberto Porta	7 June 1913 (aged 28)	15	5	(Uruguayan Football Association) Nacional
	FW	Severino Varela	14 September 1913 (aged 28)	15	11	(Uruguayan Football Association) Peñarol
	FW	Bibiano Zapirain	2 December 1919 (aged 22)	0	0	(Uruguayan Football Association) Nacional
