= Ecuador at the Copa América =

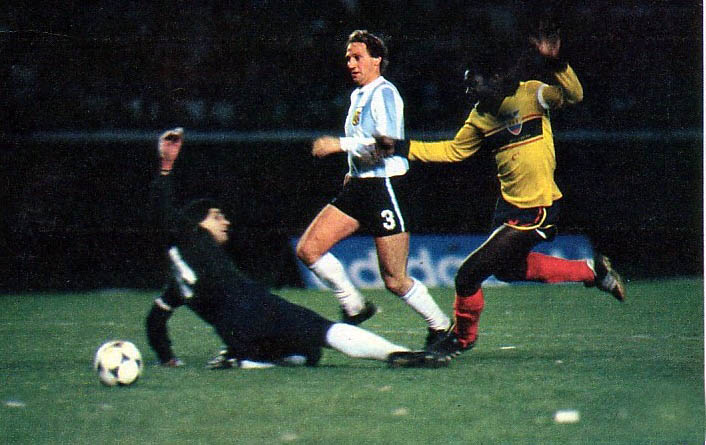
Ecuadorian striker Lupo Quiñónez in the away match against Argentina in 1983, where he scored the opening goal. The match ended 2–2. Ecuador did not advance from the strong group which also included Brazil.

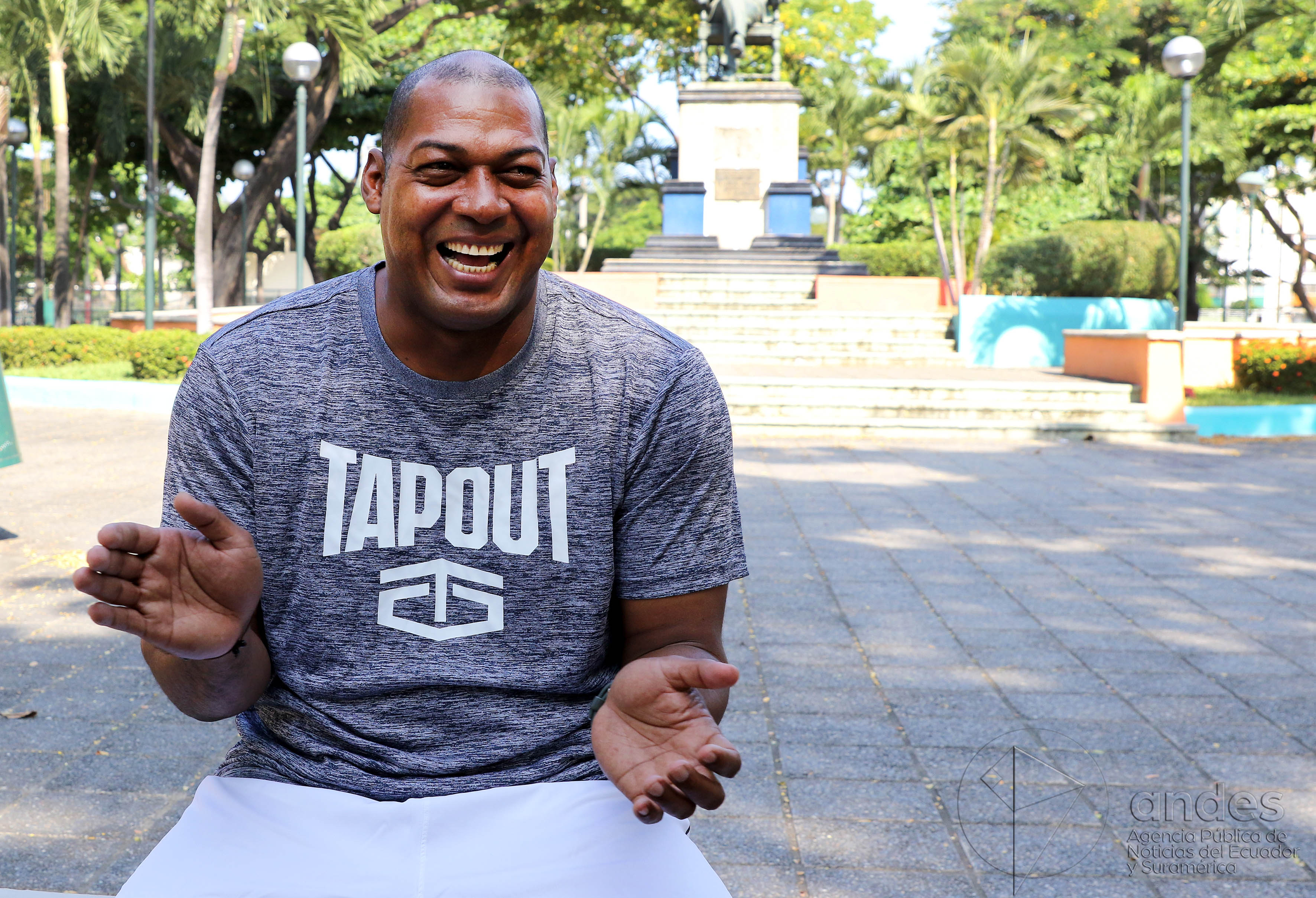
Eduardo Hurtado (here in 2016) scored three goals in Ecuador's home tournament in 1993. The team achieved their best-ever result that year, placing fourth.

The Copa América is South America's major tournament in senior men's football and determines the continental champion. Until 1967, the tournament was known as South American Championship. It is the oldest continental championship in the world.

Ecuador are one of only two CONMEBOL members who have never won a continental title, the other one being Venezuela. Both teams have never even placed in the top three.

With six goals in 1963, Carlos Alberto Raffo became that tournament's top scorer and the only Ecuadorian to ever receive an individual award at a continental championship. In spite of Raffo's goals, however, Ecuador only placed sixth out of seven nations that year.

== Overall record ==
South American Championship / Copa América record
Year	Round	Position	Pld	W	D	L	GF	GA	Squad
(Argentina) 1916	Not a CONMEBOL member								
(Uruguay) 1917	Not a CONMEBOL member								
(Brazil) 1919	Not a CONMEBOL member								
(Chile) 1920	Not a CONMEBOL member								
(Argentina) 1921	Not a CONMEBOL member								
(Brazil) 1922	Not a CONMEBOL member								
(Uruguay) 1923	Not a CONMEBOL member								
(Uruguay) 1924	Not a CONMEBOL member								
(Argentina) 1925	Not a CONMEBOL member								
(Chile) 1926	Not a CONMEBOL member								
(Peru) 1927	Did not participate								
(Argentina) 1929	Did not participate								
(Peru) 1935	Did not participate								
(Argentina) 1937	Did not participate								
(Peru) 1939	Fifth place	5th	4	0	0	4	4	18	Squad
(Chile) 1941	Fifth place	5th	4	0	0	4	1	21	Squad
(Uruguay) 1942	Seventh place	7th	6	0	0	6	4	31	Squad
(Chile) 1945	Seventh place	7th	6	0	1	5	9	27	Squad
(Argentina) 1946	Withdrew								
(Ecuador) 1947	Sixth place	6th	7	0	3	4	3	17	Squad
(Brazil) 1949	Seventh place	7th	7	1	0	6	7	21	Squad
(Peru) 1953	Seventh place	7th	6	0	2	4	1	13	Squad
(Chile) 1955	Sixth place	6th	5	0	0	5	4	22	Squad
(Uruguay) 1956	Withdrew								
(Peru) 1957	Seventh place	7th	6	0	1	5	7	23	Squad
(Argentina) 1959	Withdrew								
(Ecuador) 1959	Fourth place	4th	4	1	1	2	5	9	Squad
(Bolivia) 1963	Sixth place	6th	6	1	2	3	14	18	Squad
(Uruguay) 1967	Did not qualify								
1975	Group stage	9th	4	0	1	3	4	10	Squad
1979	Group stage	9th	4	1	0	3	4	7	Squad
1983	Group stage	9th	4	0	2	2	4	10	Squad
(Argentina) 1987	Group stage	8th	2	0	1	1	1	4	Squad
(Brazil) 1989	Group stage	7th	4	1	2	1	2	2	Squad
(Chile) 1991	Group stage	7th	4	1	1	2	6	5	Squad
(Ecuador) 1993	Fourth place	4th	6	4	0	2	13	5	Squad
(Uruguay) 1995	Group stage	9th	3	1	0	2	2	3	Squad
(Bolivia) 1997	Quarter-finals	5th	4	2	2	0	5	2	Squad
(Paraguay) 1999	Group stage	11th	3	0	0	3	3	7	Squad
(Colombia) 2001	Group stage	9th	3	1	0	2	5	5	Squad
(Peru) 2004	Group stage	12th	3	0	0	3	3	10	Squad
(Venezuela) 2007	Group stage	11th	3	0	0	3	3	6	Squad
(Argentina) 2011	Group stage	10th	3	0	1	2	2	5	Squad
(Chile) 2015	Group stage	10th	3	1	0	2	4	6	Squad
(United States) 2016	Quarter-finals	8th	4	1	2	1	7	4	Squad
(Brazil) 2019	Group stage	11th	3	0	1	2	2	7	Squad
(Brazil) 2021	Quarter-finals	8th	5	0	3	2	5	9	Squad
(United States) 2024	Quarter-finals	8th	4	1	2	1	5	4	Squad
Total	Fourth place	30/48	130	17	28	85	139	331	—

== Record by opponent ==
Ecuador fell victim to the highest defeat in tournament history when they were beaten 12–0 by Argentina in 1942. Ecuador's own highest victory was a 6–1 win against Venezuela in 1993.

Ecuador do not have a positive head-to-head record against any other CONMEBOL member at the tournament.

Copa América matches (by team)
Opponent	W	D	L	Pld	GF	GA
Argentina	0	6	11	17	13	56
Bolivia	1	5	2	8	13	12
Brazil	0	3	12	15	12	53
Chile	1	1	13	16	15	47
Colombia	2	1	10	13	12	23
Haiti	1	0	0	1	4	0
Jamaica	1	0	0	1	3	1
Japan	0	1	0	1	1	1
Mexico	1	2	3	6	5	8
Paraguay	3	3	9	15	15	26
Peru	1	4	8	13	14	30
United States	1	0	1	2	3	2
Uruguay	3	1	14	18	16	66
Venezuela	2	1	2	5	13	6
Total	17	28	85	130	139	331

== Record players ==
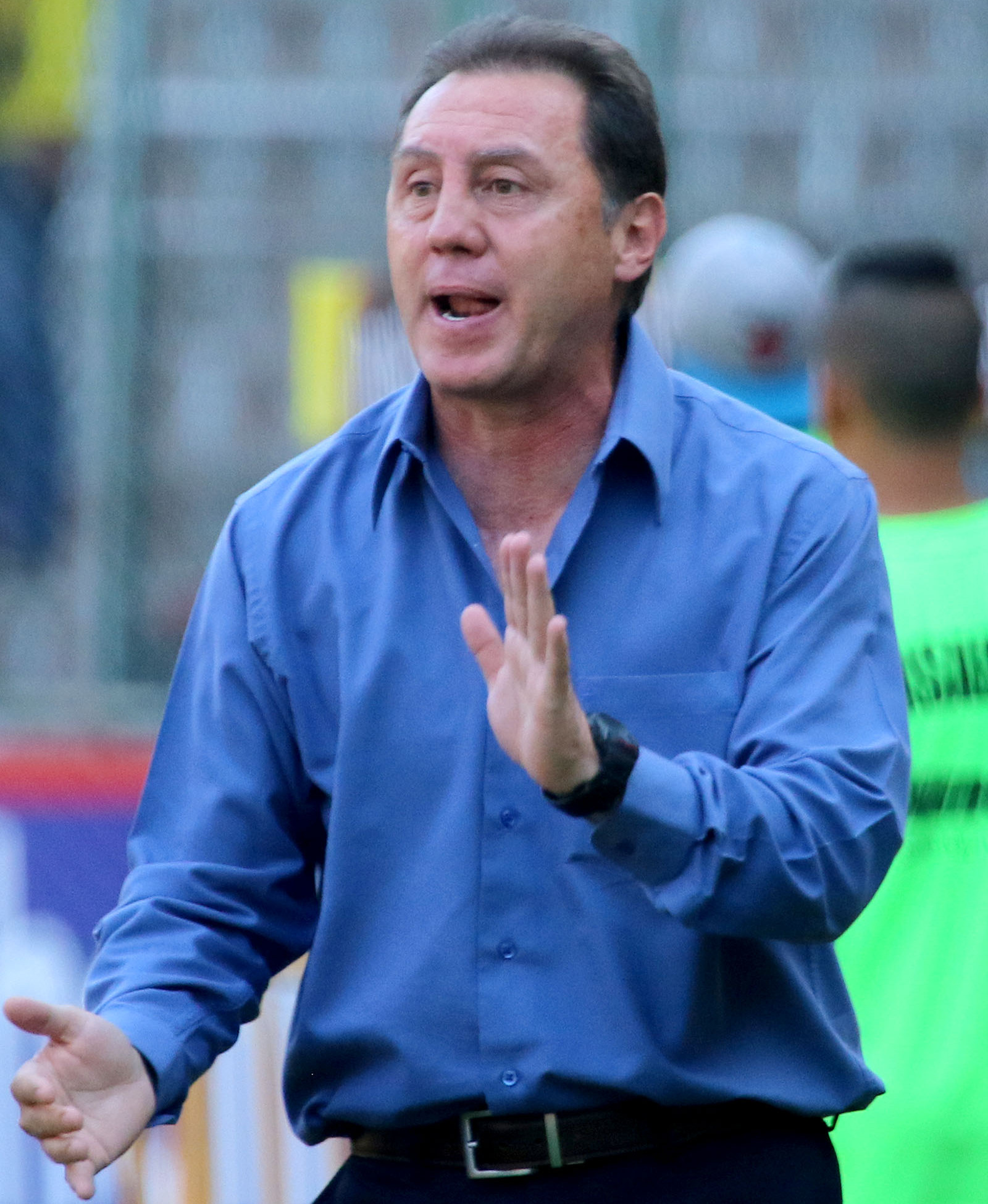
Álex Aguinaga's (here as team coach in 2015) international career spanned 17 years.

Álex Aguinaga took part in eight Copa América tournaments. The only other player with that number of tournaments is Uruguayan striker Ángel Romano, who competed in a time when the continental championship was held annually.

Rank	Player	Matches	Tournaments
1	Álex Aguinaga	25	1987, 1989, 1991, 1993, 1995, 1999, 2001 and 2004
2	Luis Capurro	22	1987, 1989, 1991, 1993, 1995 and 1997
3	Luis Antonio Mendoza	21	1941, 1942, 1945 and 1947
4	José María Jiménez	20	1942, 1945, 1947 and 1949
5	Jorge Henríquez	18	1945, 1947 and 1953
5	Carlos Sánchez	18	1947, 1949, 1953 and 1957
7	Enrique Álvarez	17	1942, 1945 and 1947
7	Napoleón Medina	17	1942, 1945 and 1947
7	Félix Zurita	17	1942, 1945 and 1947
7	José Vargas	17	1947, 1949, 1953 and 1957
7	Iván Hurtado	17	1993, 1995, 1999, 2001, 2004 and 2007
7	Enner Valencia	17	2015, 2016, 2019, 2021 and 2024

== Top goalscorers ==
Rank	Player	Goals	Tournaments (goals)
1	Carlos Alberto Raffo	8	1959 [Ecuador] (2) and 1963 (6)
2	Ney Avilés	6	1989 (1), 1991 (2) and 1993 (3)
3	José María Jiménez	5	1942 (2), 1945 (1) and 1947 (2)
3	Enner Valencia	5	2015 (2), 2016 (2) and 2019 (1)
5	Víctor Aguayo	4	1945
5	Jorge Cantos	4	1949 (1) and 1957 (3)
5	Jorge Larraz	4	1957
5	Álex Aguinaga	4	1991 (2) and 1993 (2)
5	Agustín Delgado	4	2001 (2) and 2004 (2)

== Awards and records ==
Individual awards

- Top scorer 1963: Carlos Alberto Raffo (6 goals)

Team records

- Most goals conceded (331)
- Most matches until first victory (34, 4–1 against Colombia in 1949)
- Highest defeat (0–12, against Argentina in 1942)
- Match with most goals (12, Argentina 12-0 Ecuador in 1942)

Individual records

- Most tournament participations: Álex Aguinaga (8, 1987–2004) (shared with Ángel Romano, 1916–1926)
- Longest time span between first and last match: Álex Aguinaga (17y 9d, 4 July 1987, against Peru at age 18 – 13 July 2004, against Mexico at age 36)
- Most own goals in one match: Honorato Gonzabay (2, 2–4 against Peru in 1955)

== See also ==
- Ecuador at the FIFA World Cup
- Ecuador at the CONCACAF Gold Cup
