= Hernán Fernández =

Hernán Fernández can refer to:

- Hernán Fernández (Argentine footballer)
- Hernán Fernández (Chilean footballer)
