= Avelino =

Avelino may refer to:

== Given name ==
=== Sports ===
- Avelino Acosta (1917–2008), Paraguayan football (soccer) player
- Avelino Asprilla (born 1981), former minor league baseball player
- Avelino Cañizares (1919–1993), Cuban baseball shortstop
- Avelino Chaves (1931–2021), Spanish footballer
- Avelino Jackson Coelho (born 1986), known as Jajá Coelho, Brazilian football forward/midfielder
- Julio Avelino Comesaña (born 1948), Uruguayan football manager and former Uruguayan footballer
- Avelino Gomez (1928–1980), Cuban-born Hall of Fame jockey in American and Canadian thoroughbred horse racing
- Avelino Lopes (footballer) (born 1974), Angolan football player
- Eduardo Avelino Magaña (born 1984), athlete from Mexico
- Avelino Martins (1905–?), Portuguese footballer
- Avelino Julio Robles Hernández (1951–2001), Spanish bullfighter

=== Politics ===
- Andrés Avelino Cáceres (1836–1923), three times President of Peru during the 19th century
- Avelino Coelho da Silva, candidate in the Presidential Elections in East Timor in April 2007
- Avelino González-Claudio (1942–2019), Puerto Rican independence activist who served time in a U.S. federal prison
- Avelino Méndez Rangel (1958–2021), Mexican politician

=== Other people ===
- Avelino Arredondo, Uruguayan assassin
- Avelino Cachafeiro (1899–1972), Galician musician who played the gaita, the traditional Galician bagpipe
- Avelino Corma Canos (born 1951), Spanish chemist working on heterogeneous catalysis

== Surname ==
- José Avelino (1890–1986), first President of the Senate of the Third Republic of the Philippines
- Nuno Avelino (born 1976), Portuguese professional footballer, goalkeeper
- Paulo Avelino (born 1988), Filipino television and film actor, model and singer

== Stage name ==
- Avelino (rapper) (born 1993), English musician signed to Labrinth's Odd Child Recordings

== Municipalities ==
- Pedro Avelino, municipality in the state of Rio Grande do Norte in the Northeast region of Brazil
- Senador Georgino Avelino, municipality in the state of Rio Grande do Norte in the Northeast region of Brazil
- Avelino Lopes, municipality in the state of Piauí in the Northeast region of Brazil

== See also ==
- Avelino Gomez Memorial Award, Canadian thoroughbred horse racing honour
- Estádio Avelino Ferreira Torres, multi-use stadium in Marco de Canaveses, Portugal
- Avelin
- Avellino
- Velino
