= Osvaldo Gerico =

Brazilian footballer

Personal information
- Full name: Osvaldo de Carvalho
- Date of birth: 1 May 1914
- Place of birth: Rio de Janeiro, Brazil
- Position: Defender

International career
Years	Team	Apps	(Gls)
1942	Brazil	5	(0)

Osvaldo de Carvalho nicknamed Osvaldo Gerico (born 1 May 1914, date of death unknown) was a Brazilian footballer. He played in five matches for the Brazil national football team in 1942. He was also part of Brazil's squad for the 1942 South American Championship.
