= Norival =

Brazilian footballer (1917–?)

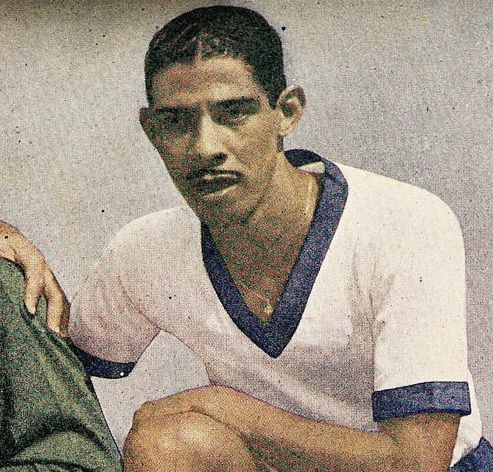
- Norival in 1945

Personal information
- Full name: Norival Pereira da Silva
- Date of birth: 5 June 1917
- Place of birth: Rio de Janeiro, Brazil
- Date of death: January 1988 (aged 70)
- Position: Defender

Senior career*
Years	Team	Apps	(Gls)
1935–1937	Madureira		
1937–1938	Vasco da Gama		
1939	Madureira		
1940–1945	Fluminense		
1945–1949	Flamengo		
1949	Corinthians		
1950–1951	Atlético Junior		

International career
1940–1946	Brazil	20	(1)
- * Club domestic league appearances and goals

Norival Pereira da Silva (born 5 June 1917 – January 1988), known as just Norival, was a Brazilian footballer who played as a defender. He made 20 appearances for the Brazil national team from 1940 to 1946. He was also part of Brazil's squad for the 1942 South American Championship. He died in January 1988, at the age of 70.
