= Paulo Flôrencio =

Brazilian footballer

Personal information
- Date of birth: 26 June 1918
- Position: Forward

International career
Years	Team	Apps	(Gls)
1942	Brazil	1	(0)

Paulo Flôrencio (born 26 June 1918, date of death unknown) was a Brazilian footballer. He played in one match for the Brazil national football team in 1942. He was also part of Brazil's squad for the 1942 South American Championship.
