= Cajú (footballer, born 1915) =

Brazilian footballer (1915 –2001)

Personal information
- Full name: Alfredo Gottardi
- Date of birth: 14 January 1915
- Place of birth: Curitiba, Brazil
- Date of death: 23 April 2001 (aged 86)
- Position: Goalkeeper

International career
| Years | Team | Apps | (Gls) |
| 1942 | Brazil | 6 | (0) |

Alfredo Gottardi (14 January 1915 – 23 April 2001), known as Cajú, was a Brazilian footballer. He played in six matches for the Brazil national football team in 1942. He was also part of Brazil's squad for the 1942 South American Championship.
