= Carlos Arancibia =

Chilean footballer (1911–1987)

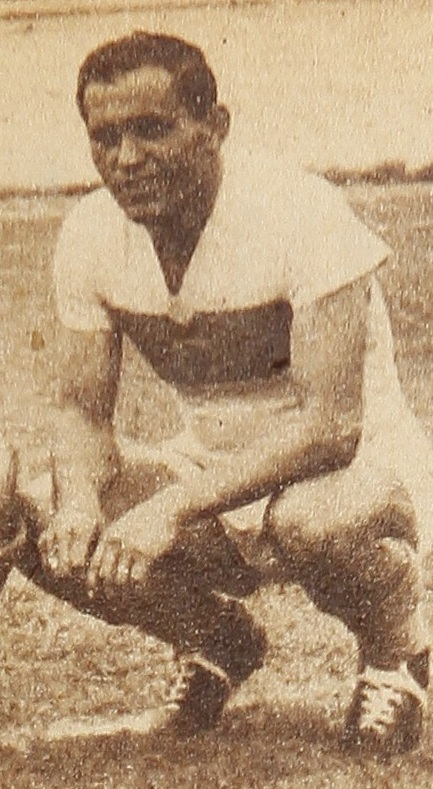

Personal information
- Full name: Carlos Arancibia Trivik
- Date of birth: 16 July 1911
- Date of death: 17 March 1987 (aged 75)
- Position: Forward

International career
| Years | Team | Apps | (Gls) |
| 1942 | Chile | 3 | (0) |

Carlos Arancibia Trivik (16 July 1911 – 17 March 1987) was a Chilean footballer. He played in three matches for the Chile national football team in 1942. He was also part of Chile's squad for the 1942 South American Championship.
