= Joanino =

Brazilian footballer

Personal information
- Date of birth: 7 June 1912
- Date of death: 26 May 1999 (aged 86)

International career
Years	Team	Apps	(Gls)
1942	Brazil	1	(0)

Joanino Beviláqua (7 June 1912 – 26 May 1999), known as just Joanino, was a Brazilian footballer. He played in one match for the Brazil national football team in 1942. He was also part of Brazil's squad for the 1942 South American Championship.
