= Mario Ibáñez =

Chilean footballer (1921–2004)

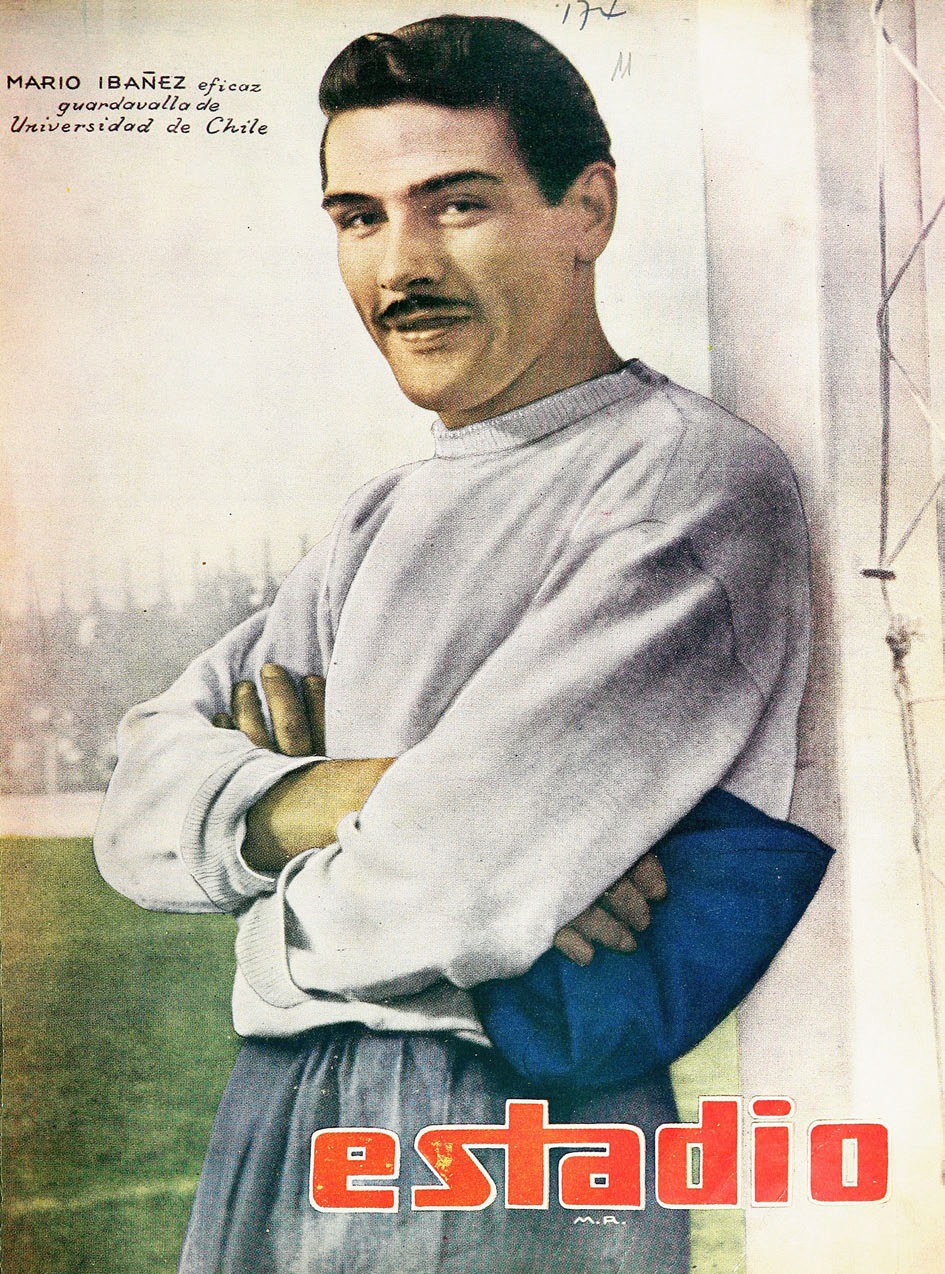

Personal information
- Date of birth: 27 July 1921
- Place of birth: Valparaíso, Chile
- Date of death: 25 November 2004 (aged 83)
- Position: Goalkeeper

International career
Years	Team	Apps	(Gls)
1942	Chile	1	(0)

Mario Ibáñez (27 July 1921 – 25 November 2004) was a Chilean footballer. He played in one match for the Chile national football team in 1942. He was also part of Chile's squad for the 1942 South American Championship.
