= Florencio Barrera =

Chilean footballer (1915–1975)

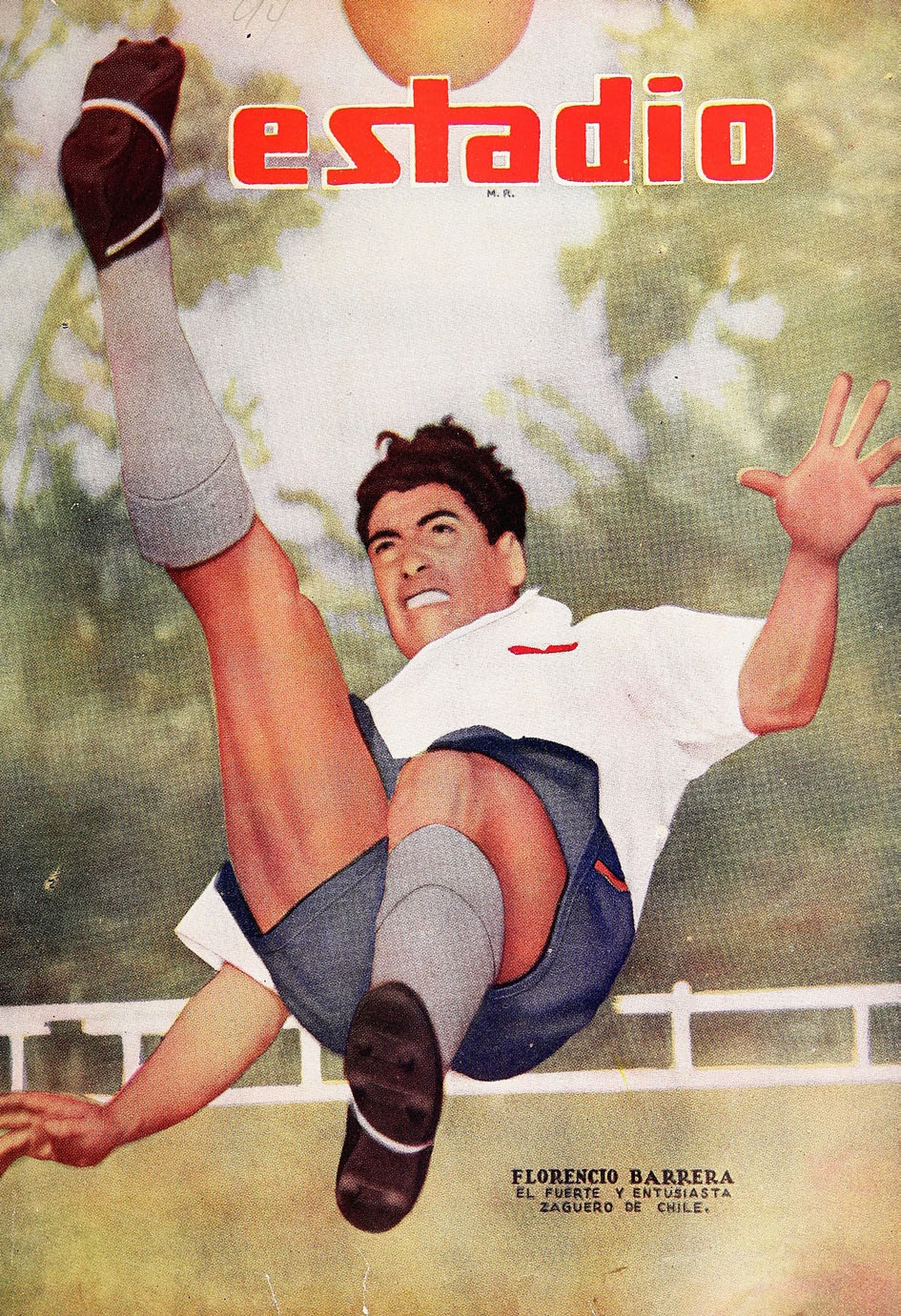

Personal information
- Full name: Florencio Segundo Barrera Godoy
- Date of birth: 6 June 1915
- Date of death: 28 March 1975 (aged 59)
- Position: Midfielder

Senior career*
Years	Team	Apps	(Gls)
- Magallanes

International career
1942–1945	Chile	10	(0)
- * Club domestic league appearances and goals

Florencio Segundo Barrera Godoy (6 June 1915 – 28 March 1975) was a Chilean footballer as a midfielder. He made ten appearances for the Chile national team from 1942 to 1945. He was also part of Chile's squad for the 1942 South American Championship.
