= Óscar Medina =

Chilean footballer (1917-1984)

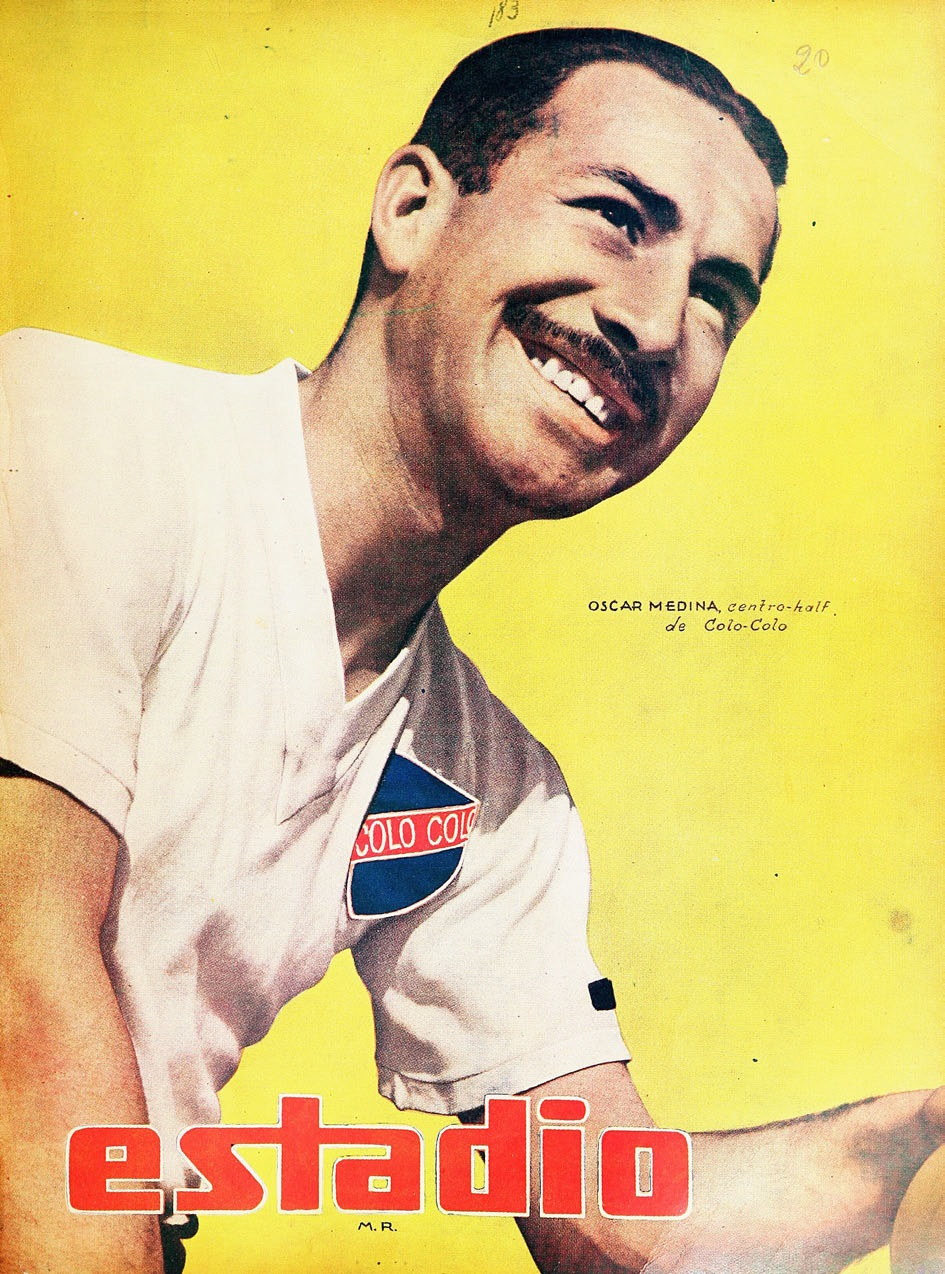
- Medina on the cover of Estadio in 1946

Personal information
- Full name: Óscar Segundo Ricardo Medina Valencia
- Date of birth: 21 May 1917
- Date of death: 10 January 1984 (aged 66)
- Position: Midfielder

Senior career*
Years	Team	Apps	(Gls)
1936–1937	Green Cross		
1938–1948	Colo-Colo	151	(1)

International career
1942	Chile	6	(0)
- * Club domestic league appearances and goals

Óscar Segundo Ricardo Medina Valencia (21 May 1917 – 10 January 1984) was a Chilean footballer. He played in six matches for the Chile national football team in 1942. He was also part of Chile's squad for the 1942 South American Championship.

== Career ==
During his career, Medina played for Green Cross and Colo-Colo. For Colo-Colo, he made 170 appearances in total and scored one goal.

== Personal life ==
He was the father of the renowned Chilean actor Hugo Medina (actor).
