= Ecuador at the FIFA World Cup =

International football delegation

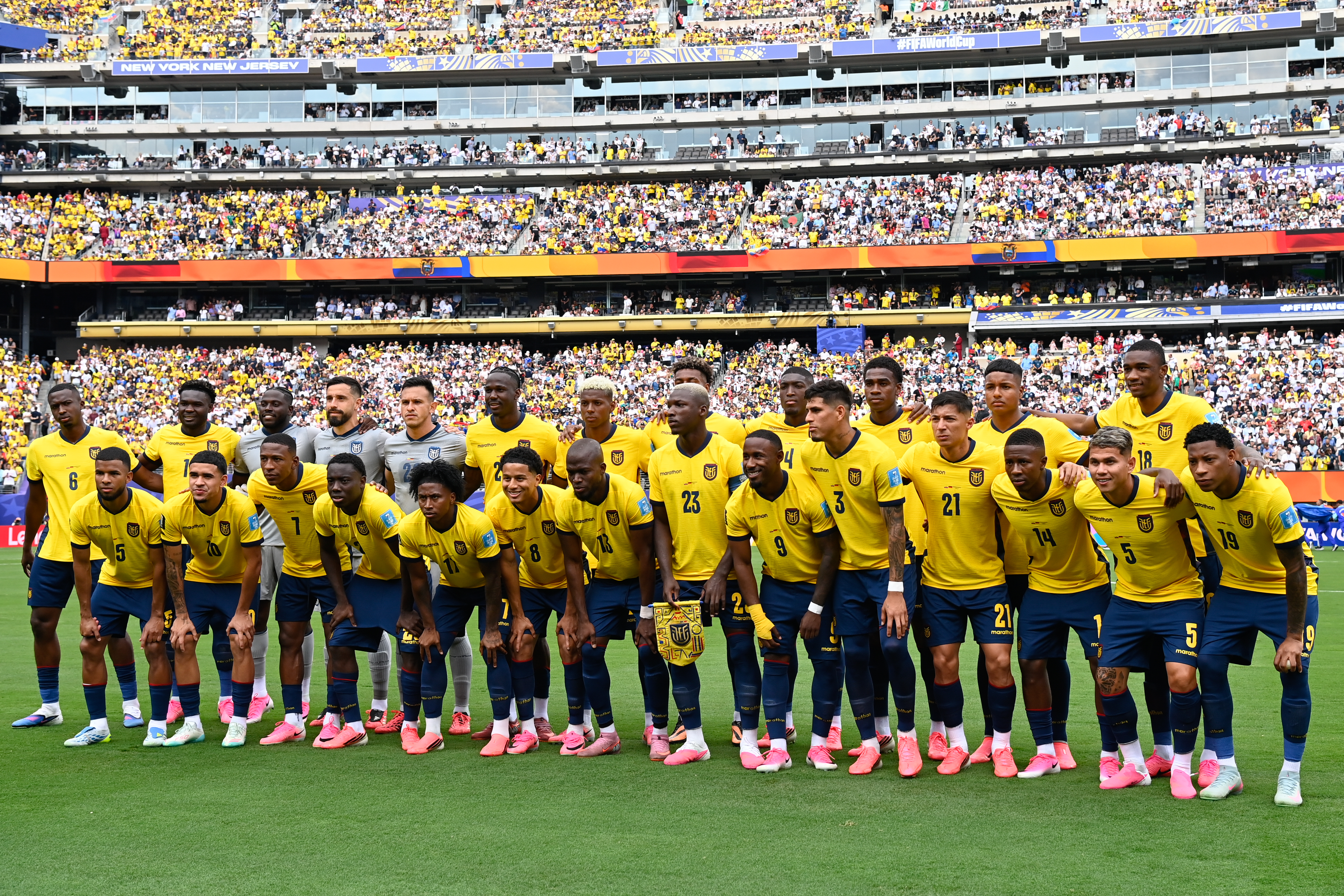
The Ecuadorian squad at the 2026 FIFA World Cup

The Ecuador national football team has appeared at five FIFA World Cups, the world's premier football tournament for national football teams. Ecuador's first participation in the World Cup was in 2002. Their best performance was in 2006, where they were eliminated in the round of 16.

== Qualification history ==
From 1930 to 1938, Ecuador refrained from FIFA World Cup qualification tournaments. Their first entry was the 1950 qualifying tournament; however, they later withdrew during qualification. Ecuador did not enter the 1954 and 1958 qualifying tournaments. From 1962 to 1998, Ecuador failed to qualify for the world's premier football tournament. They earned their first qualification in 2002 after finishing second in the CONMEBOL table. The qualification for a second tournament in 2006 was achieved after finishing third in the CONMEBOL table. Ecuador finished sixth in 2010 but did not qualify for a third consecutive World Cup tournament. Ecuador returned for the 2014 tournament before they were failed to qualify in 2018. They then qualified for back-to-back tournaments in 2022 and 2026.

Year	Position	Pld	W	D	L	GF	GA	GD	Pts	Ref.
1930	Did not enter									
1934	Did not enter									
1938	Did not enter									
1950	Withdrew									
1954	Did not enter									
1958	Did not enter									
1962	2nd in Group 1	2	0	0	2	3	11	−8	0	
1966	3rd in Group 3	4	1	0	3	4	10	−6	2	
1970	3rd in Group 3	4	0	1	3	2	8	−6	1	
1974	3rd in Group 1	4	0	2	2	3	8	−5	2	
1978	3rd in Group 3	4	0	1	3	1	9	−8	1	
1982	2nd in Group 3	4	1	1	2	2	5	−3	3	
1986	3rd in Group 2	4	0	1	3	4	11	−7	1	
1990	3rd in Group 2	4	1	1	2	4	5	−1	3	
1994	4th in Group 2	8	1	3	4	7	7	0	5	
1998	6th	16	6	3	7	22	21	+1	21	
2002	2nd	18	9	4	5	23	20	+3	31	
2006	3rd	18	8	4	6	23	19	+4	28	
2010	6th	18	6	5	7	22	26	−4	23	
2014	4th	16	7	4	5	20	16	+4	25	
2018	8th	18	6	2	10	26	29	−3	20	
2022	4th	18	7	5	6	27	19	+8	26	
2026	2nd	18	8	8	2	14	5	+9	29 (Note: Ecuador were penalized 3 points for the use of false birth documents for Byron Castillo in the previous World Cup qualification cycle.)	
Total	5 Times	179	62	46	71	208	223	−15	—	

== Overall record ==
Ecuador has advanced past the group stage twice and have managed to win at least one match in each tournament they participated in. In three of the five World Cups Ecuador has played, they were coached by Colombian managers.

FIFA World Cup finals record
Year	Result	Position	Pld	W	D*	L	GF	GA
(Uruguay) 1930	Did not enter							
(Italy) 1934	Did not enter							
(France) 1938	Did not enter							
(Brazil) 1950	Withdrew							
(Switzerland) 1954	Did not enter							
(Sweden) 1958	Did not enter							
(Chile) 1962	Did not qualify							
(England) 1966	Did not qualify							
(Mexico) 1970	Did not qualify							
(West Germany) 1974	Did not qualify							
(Argentina) 1978	Did not qualify							
(Spain) 1982	Did not qualify							
(Mexico) 1986	Did not qualify							
(Italy) 1990	Did not qualify							
(United States) 1994	Did not qualify							
(France) 1998	Did not qualify							
(South Korea) (Japan) 2002	Group stage	24th	3	1	0	2	2	4
(Germany) 2006	Round of 16	12th	4	2	0	2	5	4
(South Africa) 2010	Did not qualify							
(Brazil) 2014	Group stage	17th	3	1	1	1	3	3
(Russia) 2018	Did not qualify							
(Qatar) 2022	Group stage	18th	3	1	1	1	4	3
(Canada) (Mexico) (United States) 2026	Round of 32	25th	4	1	1	2	2	4
(Morocco) (Portugal) (Spain) 2030	To be determined							
(Saudi Arabia) 2034	To be determined							
Total	Round of 16	5/26	17	6	3	8	16	18

== 2002 FIFA World Cup ==
Ecuador qualified for their first FIFA World Cup by finishing second in the CONMEBOL qualification tournament, finishing ahead of Brazil. Ecuador were drawn into Group G, alongside Mexico, Italy, and Croatia.

Ecuador made a losing World Cup debut against world powers Italy, falling 2–0 by courtesy of a Christian Vieri double. Their next match against Mexico went better, but ended in their 2–1 defeat. Agustín Delgado scored for Ecuador's first ever World Cup goal and put them ahead, but goals from Jared Borgetti and Gerardo Torrado canceled the early strike and effectively eliminated them from the tournament. A second-half goal from Édison Méndez did seal a 1–0 consolation win in the final match against Croatia. Although they finished the tournament last in their group, they managed to eliminate Croatia, previous third-place in 1998 World Cup, from the competition.

Final Group G standings
Team	Pld	W	D	L	GF	GA	GD	Pts
Mexico	3	2	1	0	4	2	+2	7
Italy	3	1	1	1	4	3	+1	4
Croatia	3	1	0	2	2	3	−1	3
Ecuador	3	1	0	2	2	4	−2	3

June 3, 2002 Group Stage	Italy	2–0	Ecuador	Sapporo
20:30 UTC+09:00	Vieri 7', 27'	Report		Stadium: Sapporo Dome; Attendance: 31,081; Referee: Brian Hall (United States)

June 9, 2002 Group Stage	Mexico	2–1	Ecuador	Miyagi
15:30 UTC+09:00	Borgetti 28'; Torrado 57'	Report	Delgado 5'	Stadium: Miyagi Stadium; Attendance: 45,610; Referee: Mourad Daami (Tunisia)

June 13, 2002 Group Stage	Ecuador	1–0	Croatia	Yokohama
20:30 UTC+09:00	Méndez 48'	Report		Stadium: International Stadium Yokohama; Attendance: 65,862; Referee: William Mattus (Costa Rica)

Squad statistics
Num	Pos	Player	Date of birth (age)	Club	Minutes played			
Num	Pos	Player	Date of birth (age)	Club	ITA	MEX	CRO	Total
1	GK	José Francisco Cevallos	April 17, 1971 (aged 31)	(Ecuador) Barcelona	90	90	90	270
2	DF	Augusto Porozo	April 13, 1974 (aged 28)	(Ecuador) Emelec	90	90	90	270
3	DF	Iván Hurtado	August 16, 1974 (aged 27)	(Ecuador) Barcelona	90	90	90	270
4	DF	Ulises de la Cruz	February 8, 1974 (aged 28)	(Scotland) Hibernian	90	90	90	270
5	MF	Alfonso Obregón	May 12, 1972 (aged 30)	(Ecuador) LDU Quito	90	58	40	188
6	DF	Raúl Guerrón	October 12, 1976 (aged 25)	(Ecuador) Deportivo Quito	90	90	90	270
7	MF	Nicolás Asencio	April 26, 1975 (aged 27)	(Ecuador) Barcelona	5	0	0	5
8	DF	Luis Gómez	April 20, 1972 (aged 30)	(Ecuador) Barcelona	0	0	0	0
9	FW	Iván Kaviedes	October 24, 1977 (aged 24)	(Ecuador) Barcelona	0	53	14	67
10	MF	Álex Aguinaga	July 9, 1968 (aged 33)	(Mexico) Necaxa	45	32	50	127
11	FW	Agustín Delgado	December 23, 1974 (aged 27)	(England) Southampton	90	90	90	270
12	GK	Oswaldo Ibarra	September 8, 1969 (aged 32)	(Ecuador) El Nacional	0	0	0	0
13	FW	Ángel Fernández	August 2, 1971 (aged 30)	(Ecuador) El Nacional	0	0	0	0
14	MF	Juan Carlos Burbano	February 15, 1969 (aged 33)	(Ecuador) El Nacional	0	0	0	0
15	DF	Marlon Ayoví	September 27, 1971 (aged 30)	(Ecuador) Deportivo Quito	31	55	90	176
16	MF	Cléber Chalá	June 29, 1971 (aged 30)	(Ecuador) El Nacional	85	90	90	265
17	DF	Giovanny Espinoza	April 12, 1977 (aged 25)	(Ecuador) Aucas	0	0	0	0
18	MF	Carlos Tenorio	May 14, 1979 (aged 23)	(Ecuador) LDU Quito	45	37	76	158
19	MF	Édison Méndez	March 16, 1979 (aged 23)	(Ecuador) Deportivo Quito	90	90	90	270
20	MF	Edwin Tenorio	June 16, 1976 (aged 25)	(Ecuador) Barcelona	59	35	0	94
21	MF	Wellington Sánchez	June 19, 1974 (aged 27)	(Ecuador) Emelec	0	0	0	0
22	GK	Daniel Viteri	December 12, 1981 (aged 20)	(Ecuador) Emelec	0	0	0	0
23	MF	Walter Ayoví	August 11, 1979 (aged 22)	(Ecuador) Emelec	0	0	0	0
Manager: (Colombia) Hernán Darío Gómez

== 2006 FIFA World Cup ==
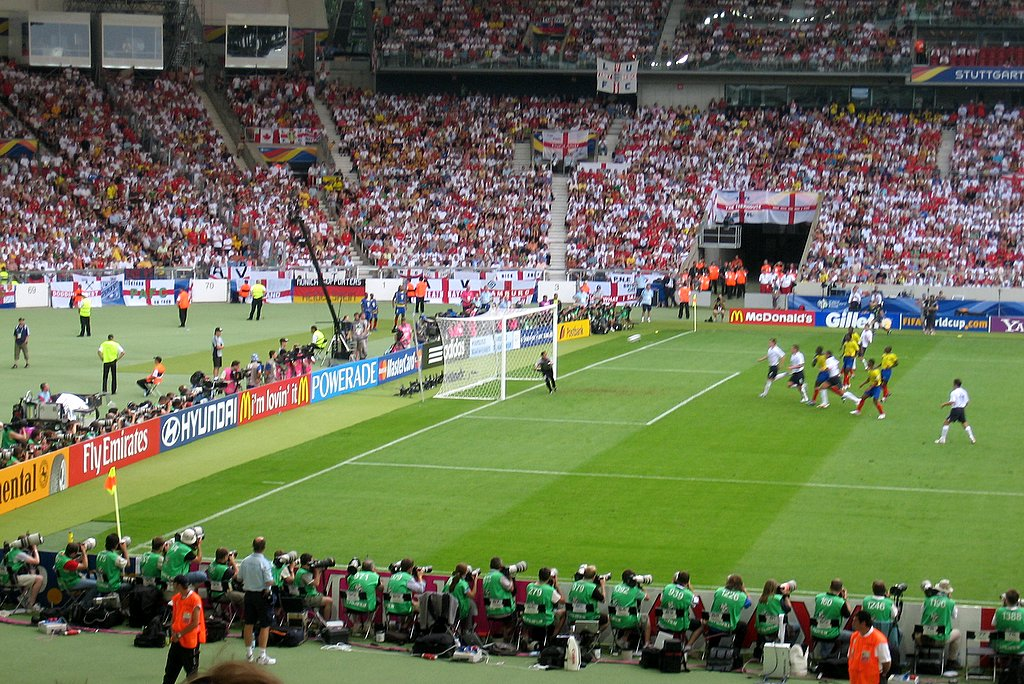
Ecuador facing England at the Round of 16

Ecuador qualified for their second FIFA World Cup by finishing third in the CONMEBOL qualification tournament. They were drawn into Group A, alongside hosts Germany, Poland, and Costa Rica.

Ecuador campaign got off with a shock 2–0 win against Poland in their first game in Gelsenkirchen, with goals from Carlos Tenorio and Agustín Delgado. They then beat Costa Rica 3–0 in Hamburg with goals coming from Carlos Tenorio, Agustín Delgado, and Iván Kaviedes. The win advanced them to the next round. Their qualification complete, they rested key players against the hosts Germany and were beaten 3–0. Ecuador finished second in Group A behind Germany and faced England in the Round of 16. A second-half free-kick from David Beckham was the only goal of the game, which eliminated Ecuador from the World Cup.

Final Group A standings
Team	Pld	W	D	L	GF	GA	GD	Pts
Germany	3	3	0	0	8	2	+6	9
Ecuador	3	2	0	1	5	3	+2	6
Poland	3	1	0	2	2	4	−2	3
Costa Rica	3	0	0	3	3	9	−6	0

June 9, 2006 Group Stage	Poland	0–2	Ecuador	Gelsenkirchen
21:00 UTC+02:00		Report	C. Tenorio 24'; Delgado 80'	Stadium: FIFA WM Stadion Gelsenkirchen; Attendance: 52,000; Referee: Toru Kamikawa (Japan)

June 15, 2006 Group Stage	Ecuador	3–0	Costa Rica	Hamburg
15:00 UTC+02:00	C. Tenorio 8'; Delgado 54'; Kaviedes 90+2'	Report		Stadium: FIFA WM Stadion Hamburg; Attendance: 50,000; Referee: Coffi Codjia (Benin)

June 20, 2006 Group Stage	Ecuador	0–3	Germany	Berlin
16:00 UTC+02:00		Report	Klose 4', 44'; Podolski 57'	Stadium: Olympiastadion; Attendance: 72,000; Referee: Valentin Ivanov (Russia)

June 25, 2006 Round of 16	England	1–0	Ecuador	Stuttgart
17:00 UTC+02:00	Beckham 60'	Report		Stadium: Gottlieb-Daimler-Stadion; Attendance: 52,000; Referee: Frank De Bleeckere (Belgium)

Squad statistics
Num	Pos	Player	Date of birth (age)	Club	Minutes played				
Num	Pos	Player	Date of birth (age)	Club	POL	CRC	GER	ENG	Total
1	GK	Edwin Villafuerte	March 12, 1979 (aged 27)	(Ecuador) Deportivo Quito	0	0	0	0	0
2	DF	Jorge Guagua	September 28, 1981 (aged 24)	(Ecuador) El Nacional	21	21	90	0	132
3	DF	Iván Hurtado	August 16, 1974 (aged 31)	(Qatar) Al-Arabi	69	90	0	90	249
4	DF	Ulises de la Cruz	February 8, 1974 (aged 32)	(England) Aston Villa	90	90	90	90	360
5	DF	José Luis Perlaza	October 6, 1981 (aged 24)	(Ecuador) Olmedo	0	0	0	0	0
6	MF	Patricio Urrutia	October 15, 1977 (aged 28)	(Ecuador) LDU Quito	7	17	22	0	46
7	MF	Christian Lara	April 27, 1980 (aged 26)	(Ecuador) El Nacional	0	0	27	21	48
8	MF	Édison Méndez	March 16, 1979 (aged 27)	(Ecuador) LDU Quito	90	90	90	90	360
9	FW	Félix Borja	April 2, 1983 (aged 23)	(Ecuador) El Nacional	0	0	45	0	45
10	FW	Iván Kaviedes	October 24, 1977 (aged 28)	(Argentina) Argentinos Juniors	25	45	90	18	178
11	FW	Agustín Delgado	December 23, 1974 (aged 31)	(Ecuador) LDU Quito	83	90	0	90	263
12	GK	Cristian Mora	August 26, 1979 (aged 26)	(Ecuador) LDU Quito	90	90	90	90	360
13	DF	Paúl Ambrosi	October 14, 1980 (aged 25)	(Ecuador) LDU Quito	0	0	90	0	0
14	MF	Segundo Castillo	May 15, 1982 (aged 24)	(Ecuador) El Nacional	90	90	0	90	270
15	MF	Marlon Ayoví	August 27, 1971 (aged 34)	(Ecuador) Deportivo Quito	0	0	68	0	68
16	MF	Antonio Valencia	August 4, 1985 (aged 20)	(Spain) Recreativo de Huelva	90	73	63	90	316
17	DF	Giovanny Espinoza	April 12, 1977 (aged 29)	(Ecuador) LDU Quito	90	69	90	90	339
18	DF	Néicer Reasco	July 23, 1977 (aged 28)	(Ecuador) LDU Quito	90	90	0	90	270
19	MF	Luis Saritama	October 20, 1983 (aged 22)	(Ecuador) Deportivo Quito	0	0	0	0	0
20	MF	Edwin Tenorio	June 16, 1976 (aged 29)	(Ecuador) Barcelona	90	90	90	69	339
21	FW	Carlos Tenorio	May 14, 1979 (aged 27)	(Qatar) Al-Sadd	65	45	0	72	182
22	GK	Damián Lanza	April 10, 1982 (aged 24)	(Ecuador) Aucas	0	0	0	0	0
23	FW	Christian Benítez	May 1, 1986 (aged 20)	(Ecuador) El Nacional	0	0	0	45	0
Coach: (Colombia) Luis Fernando Suárez

== 2014 FIFA World Cup ==
Michael Arroyo taking a free kick against Switzerland

Ecuador qualified for their third FIFA World Cup by finishing fourth in the CONMEBOL qualification tournament. Ecuador was drawn into Group E, alongside France, Honduras and Switzerland.

Ecuador played its first match in Brasília, capital of Brazil. Enner Valencia scored the first goal of the match for Ecuador against Switzerland, but the squad happened to allow the European team to win 2–1. In the second match, played in the city of Curitiba, Honduras scored the first goal, but Enner Valencia scored twice, giving Ecuador its first victory at the 2014 World Cup. The last match of the group was played in Rio de Janeiro against France, but nobody scored any goal, despite Ecuador captain Antonio Valencia getting sent off in the 50th minute. These results, however, were not enough to make the country qualify to the next phase of the tournament.

Final Group E standings
Team	Pld	W	D	L	GF	GA	GD	Pts
France	3	2	1	0	8	2	+6	7
Switzerland	3	2	0	1	7	6	+1	6
Ecuador	3	1	1	1	3	3	0	4
Honduras	3	0	0	3	1	8	−7	0

June 15, 2014 Group Stage	Switzerland	2–1	Ecuador	Brasília
13:00 UTC-03:00	Mehmedi 48'; Seferovic 90+3'	Report	E. Valencia 22'	Stadium: Estádio Nacional Mané Garrincha; Attendance: 68,351; Referee: Ravshan Irmatov (Uzbekistan)

June 20, 2014 Group Stage	Honduras	1–2	Ecuador	Curitiba
19:00 UTC-03:00	Costly 31'	Report	E. Valencia 34', 65'	Stadium: Arena da Baixada; Attendance: 39,224; Referee: Ben Williams (Australia)

June 25, 2014 Group Stage	Ecuador	0–0	France	Rio de Janeiro
17:00 UTC-03:00		Report		Stadium: Estádio do Maracanã; Attendance: 73,749; Referee: Noumandiez Doué (Ivory Coast)

Squad statistics
Num	Pos	Player	Date of birth (age)	Club	Minutes played			
Num	Pos	Player	Date of birth (age)	Club	SUI	HON	FRA	Total
1	GK	Máximo Banguera	December 16, 1985 (aged 28)	(Ecuador) Barcelona	0	0	0	0
2	DF	Jorge Guagua	September 28, 1981 (aged 32)	(Ecuador) Emelec	90	90	90	270
3	DF	Frickson Erazo	May 5, 1988 (aged 26)	(Brazil) Flamengo	90	90	90	270
4	DF	Juan Carlos Paredes	July 8, 1987 (aged 26)	(Ecuador) Barcelona	90	90	90	270
5	MF	Renato Ibarra	January 20, 1991 (aged 23)	(Netherlands) Vitesse	0	0	27	27
6	MF	Christian Noboa	April 9, 1985 (aged 29)	(Russia) Dynamo Moscow	90	90	89	269
7	MF	Jefferson Montero	September 1, 1989 (aged 24)	(Mexico) Monarcas Morelia	77	90	63	230
8	MF	Édison Méndez	March 16, 1979 (aged 35)	(Colombia) Independiente Santa Fe	0	8	0	8
9	MF	Joao Rojas	June 14, 1989 (aged 24)	(Mexico) Cruz Azul	13	0	0	13
10	DF	Walter Ayoví	August 11, 1979 (aged 34)	(Mexico) Pachuca	0	0	0	0
11	FW	Felipe Caicedo	September 5, 1988 (aged 25)	(United Arab Emirates) Al-Jazira	70	82	1	153
12	GK	Adrián Bone	September 8, 1988 (aged 25)	(Ecuador) El Nacional	0	0	0	0
13	FW	Enner Valencia	April 11, 1989 (aged 25)	(Mexico) Pachuca	90	90	90	270
14	MF	Oswaldo Minda	July 26, 1983 (aged 30)	(United States) Chivas USA	0	83	90	177
15	MF	Michael Arroyo	April 23, 1987 (aged 27)	(Mexico) Atlante	20	0	82	102
16	MF	Antonio Valencia	August 4, 1985 (aged 28)	(England) Manchester United	90	90	50	230
17	FW	Jaime Ayoví	February 21, 1988 (aged 26)	(Mexico) Tijuana	0	0	0	0
18	DF	Óscar Bagüí	December 10, 1982 (aged 31)	(Ecuador) Emelec	0	0	0	0
19	MF	Luis Saritama	October 20, 1983 (aged 30)	(Ecuador) Barcelona	0	0	0	0
20	MF	Fidel Martínez	February 15, 1990 (aged 24)	(Mexico) Tijuana	0	0	0	0
21	DF	Gabriel Achilier	March 24, 1985 (aged 29)	(Ecuador) Emelec	0	2	8	10
22	GK	Alexander Domínguez	June 5, 1987 (aged 27)	(Ecuador) LDU Quito	90	90	90	270
23	MF	Carlos Gruezo	April 19, 1995 (aged 19)	(Germany) VfB Stuttgart	90	7	0	97
Manager: (Colombia) Reinaldo Rueda

== 2022 FIFA World Cup ==
=== Group stage ===
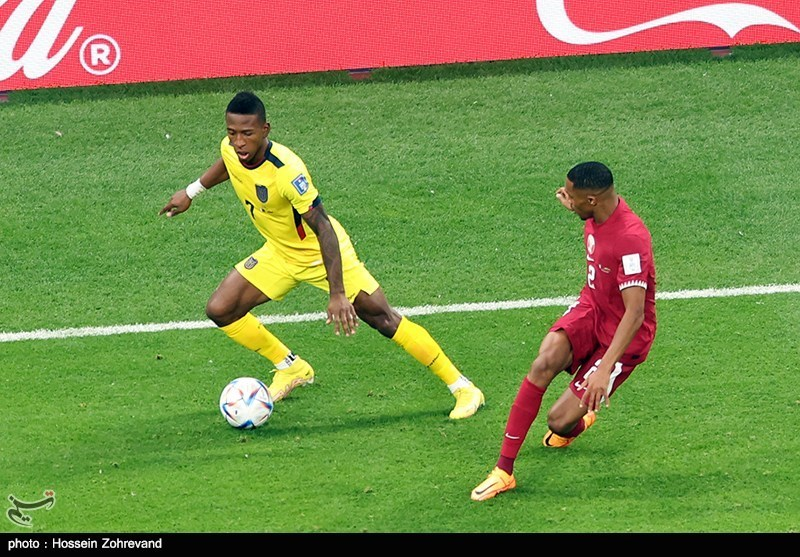
Ecuador opened the 2022 FIFA World Cup against hosts Qatar

Pos	Team	Pld	W	D	L	GF	GA	GD	Pts	Qualification
1	Netherlands	3	2	1	0	5	1	+4	7	Advanced to knockout stage
2	Senegal	3	2	0	1	5	4	+1	6	Advanced to knockout stage
3	Ecuador	3	1	1	1	4	3	+1	4	
4	Qatar (H)	3	0	0	3	1	7	−6	0	

Source: FIFA
Rules for classification: Group stage tiebreakers
(H) Hosts
20 November 2022
19:00

Qatar	0–2	Ecuador
		Valencia 16' (pen.), 31'

Al Bayt Stadium, Al Khor
Attendance: 67,372
Referee: Daniele Orsato (Italy)

25 November 2022
19:00

Netherlands	1–1	Ecuador
Gakpo 6'		Valencia 49'

Khalifa International Stadium, Al Rayyan
Attendance: 44,833
Referee: Mustapha Ghorbal (Algeria)

29 November 2022
18:00

Ecuador	1–2	Senegal
Caicedo 67'		I. Sarr 44' (pen.); Koulibaly 70'

Khalifa International Stadium, Al Rayyan
Attendance: 44,569
Referee: Clément Turpin (France)

Num	Pos	Player	Date of birth (age)	Club	Minutes played			
Num	Pos	Player	Date of birth (age)	Club	QAT	NED	SEN	Total
1	GK	Hernán Galíndez	March 30, 1987 (aged 35)	(Ecuador) Aucas	90	90	90	270
2	DF	Félix Torres	January 11, 1997 (aged 25)	(Mexico) Santos Laguna	90	90	90	270
3	DF	Piero Hincapié	January 9, 2002 (aged 20)	(Germany) Bayer 04 Leverkusen	90	90	90	270
4	DF	Robert Arboleda	October 22, 1991 (aged 31)	(Brazil) São Paulo	0	0	0	0
5	MF	José Cifuentes	March 12, 1999 (aged 23)	(United States) Los Angeles FC	13	0	45	58
6	DF	Willian Pacho	October 16, 2001 (aged 21)	(Belgium) Royal Antwerp	0	0	0	0
7	DF	Pervis Estupiñán	January 21, 1998 (aged 24)	(England) Brighton & Hove Albion	90	90	90	270
8	MF	Carlos Gruezo	April 19, 1995 (aged 27)	(Germany) Augsburg	0	0	45	45
9	MF	Ayrton Preciado	July 17, 1994 (aged 28)	(Mexico) Santos Laguna	0	0	0	0
10	MF	Romario Ibarra	September 24, 1994 (aged 28)	(Mexico) Pachuca	68	1	0	69
11	FW	Michael Estrada	April 7, 1996 (aged 26)	(Mexico) Cruz Azul	90	74	64	228
12	GK	W. Moisés Ramírez	September 9, 2000 (aged 22)	(Ecuador) Independiente del Valle	0	0	0	0
13	FW	Enner Valencia	November 4, 1989 (aged 33)	(Turkey) Fenerbahçe	77	90	90	257
14	DF	Xavier Arreaga	September 28, 1994 (aged 28)	(United States) Seattle Sounders FC	0	0	0	0
15	MF	Ángel Mena	January 21, 1988 (aged 34)	(Mexico) León	0	0	0	0
16	MF	Jeremy Sarmiento	June 16, 2002 (aged 20)	(England) Brighton & Hove Albion	22	16	45	83
17	DF	Angelo Preciado	February 18, 1998 (aged 24)	(Belgium) Genk	90	90	85	265
18	DF	Diego Palacios	July 12, 1999 (aged 23)	(United States) Los Angeles FC	0	0	0	0
19	MF	Gonzalo Plata	November 1, 2000 (aged 22)	(Spain) Real Valladolid	90	90	90	270
20	MF	Jhegson Méndez	April 26, 1997 (aged 25)	(United States) Los Angeles FC	90	90	0	180
21	MF	Alan Franco	August 21, 1998 (aged 24)	(Argentina) Talleres (C)	1	0	45	46
22	GK	Alexander Domínguez	June 5, 1987 (aged 35)	(Ecuador) LDU Quito	0	0	0	0
23	MF	Moisés Caicedo	November 2, 2001 (aged 21)	(England) Brighton & Hove Albion	0	90	90	270
24	FW	Djorkaeff Reasco	January 18, 1999 (aged 23)	(Argentina) Newell's Old Boys	0	0	26	26
25	DF	Jackson Porozo	August 4, 2000 (aged 22)	(France) ES Troyes AC	0	90	5	95
26	FW	Kevin Rodríguez	March 4, 2000 (aged 22)	(Ecuador) Imbabura SC	1	1	0	2
Manager: (Argentina) Gustavo Alfaro

== 2026 FIFA World Cup ==
=== Group stage ===
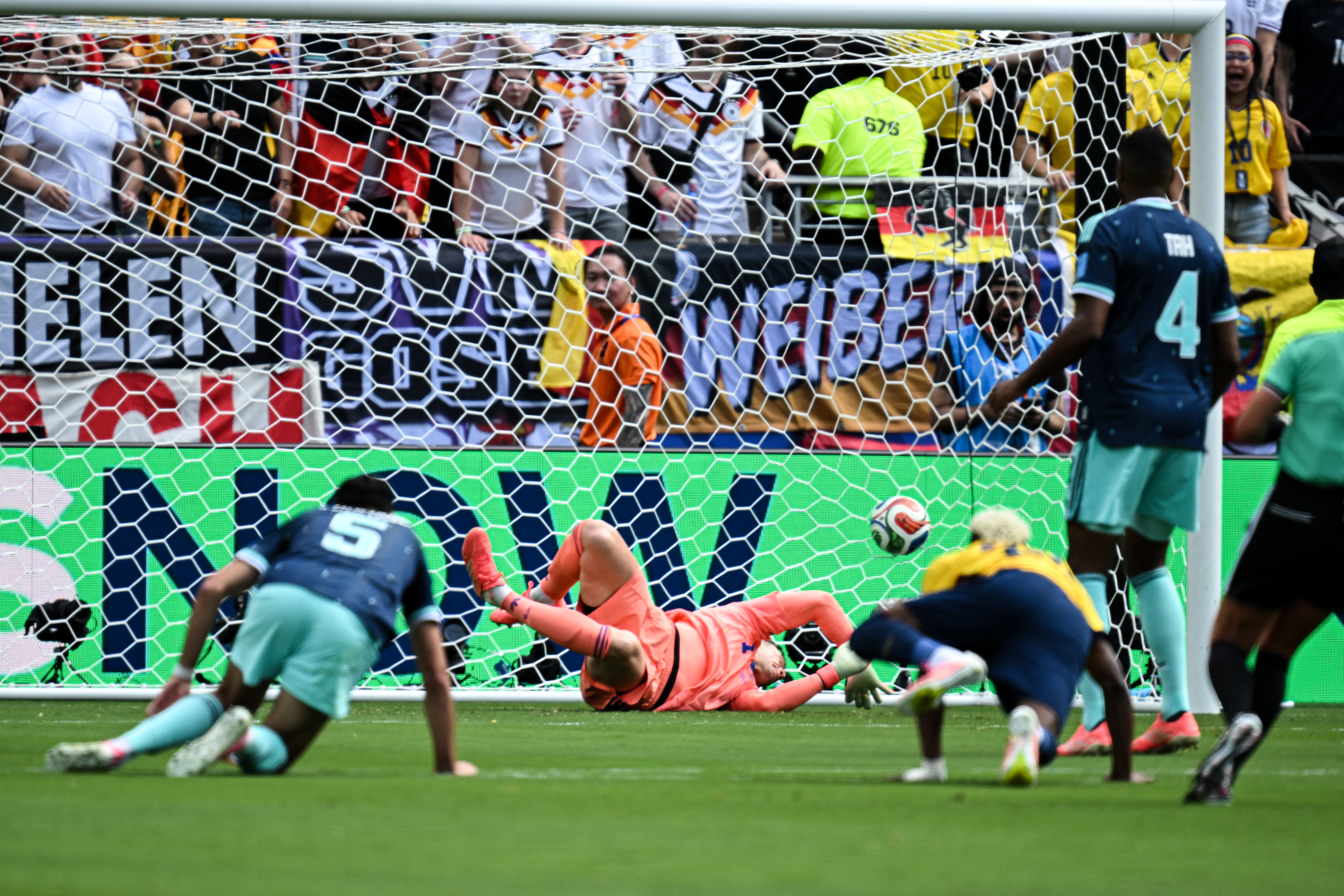
Nilson Angulo scoring against Germany

Pos	Team	Pld	W	D	L	GF	GA	GD	Pts	Qualification
1	Germany	3	2	0	1	10	4	+6	6 (Note: Head-to-head result: Germany 2–1 Ivory Coast.)	Advance to knockout stage
2	Ivory Coast	3	2	0	1	4	2	+2	6	Advance to knockout stage
3	Ecuador	3	1	1	1	2	2	0	4	Advance to knockout stage
4	Curaçao	3	0	1	2	1	9	−8	1	

Source: FIFA
Rules for classification: Group stage tiebreakers
Notes:
June 14, 2026
7:00 p.m. UTC−4

Ivory Coast	1–0	Ecuador
Diallo 90'	(Note: "Côte d'Ivoire vs Ecuador | First Stage | FIFA World Cup 2026". FIFA. Retrieved June 14, 2026.; "Match Report – Group E – Côte d'Ivoire v. Ecuador". FIFA. June 15, 2026. Retrieved June 15, 2026.; "Post match summary report – Group E – Côte d'Ivoire v. Ecuador". FIFA. June 14, 2026. Retrieved June 15, 2026.)

Lincoln Financial Field, Philadelphia
Attendance: 68,274
Referee: François Letexier (France) (Note: Michael Oliver (England) was originally appointed to the Ivory Coast vs Ecuador match, but he pulled out due to a minor injury.)

June 20, 2026
7:00 p.m. UTC−5

Ecuador	0–0	Curaçao
	(Note: "Ecuador vs Curaçao | First Stage | FIFA World Cup 2026". FIFA. Retrieved June 21, 2026.; "Match Report – Group E – Ecuador v. Curaçao". FIFA. June 21, 2026. Retrieved June 21, 2026.; "Post match summary report – Group E – Ecuador v. Curaçao". FIFA. June 21, 2026. Retrieved June 21, 2026.)

Arrowhead Stadium, Kansas City
Attendance: 68,598
Referee: Ma Ning (China)

June 25, 2026
4:00 p.m. UTC−4

Ecuador	2–1	Germany
Angulo 9'; Plata 77'	(Note: "Ecuador vs Germany | First Stage | FIFA World Cup 2026". FIFA. Retrieved June 25, 2026.; "Match Report – Group E – Ecuador v. Germany". FIFA. June 25, 2026. Retrieved June 25, 2026.; "Post match summary report – Group E – Ecuador v. Germany". FIFA. June 25, 2026. Retrieved June 27, 2026.)	Sané 2'

MetLife Stadium, East Rutherford
Attendance: 80,663
Referee: Tori Penso (United States)

Ranking of third-placed teams

Pos	Grp	Team	Pld	W	D	L	GF	GA	GD	Pts	Qualification
1	K	DR Congo	3	1	1	1	4	3	+1	4	Advance to knockout stage
2	F	Sweden	3	1	1	1	7	7	0	4	Advance to knockout stage
3	L	Ghana	3	1	1	1	2	2	0	4 (Note: Team conduct score: Ghana −3, Ecuador −5.)	Advance to knockout stage
4	E	Ecuador	3	1	1	1	2	2	0	4	Advance to knockout stage
5	B	Bosnia and Herzegovina	3	1	1	1	5	6	−1	4	Advance to knockout stage
6	J	Algeria	3	1	1	1	5	7	−2	4	Advance to knockout stage
7	D	Paraguay	3	1	1	1	2	4	−2	4	Advance to knockout stage
8	I	Senegal	3	1	0	2	8	6	+2	3	Advance to knockout stage
9	G	Iran	3	0	3	0	3	3	0	3	
10	A	South Korea	3	1	0	2	2	3	−1	3	
11	C	Scotland	3	1	0	2	1	4	−3	3	
12	H	Uruguay	3	0	2	1	3	4	−1	2	

Source: FIFA
Rules for classification: 1) Points; 2) Goal difference; 3) Goals scored; 4) Team conduct ("fair play") score; 5) Latest FIFA ranking (June 11, 2026); 6) Previous FIFA ranking(s) report.

=== Knockout stage ===
Round of 32

June 30, 2026
8:00 p.m. UTC−6 (Note: The Mexico v Ecuador match, originally scheduled for 7:00 p.m. UTC−6, was delayed by an hour due to adverse weather conditions.)

Mexico	2–0	Ecuador
Quiñones 22'; Jiménez 31'	(Note: "Mexico vs Ecuador | Round of 32 | FIFA World Cup 2026". FIFA. Retrieved July 1, 2026.; "Match Report – Round of 32 – Mexico v. Ecuador". FIFA. July 1, 2026. Retrieved July 1, 2026.; "Post match summary report – Round of 32 – Mexico v. Ecuador". FIFA. July 1, 2026. Retrieved July 1, 2026.)

Estadio Azteca, Mexico City
Attendance: 80,824
Referee: Slavko Vinčić (Slovenia)

== Player records ==
=== Most appearances ===
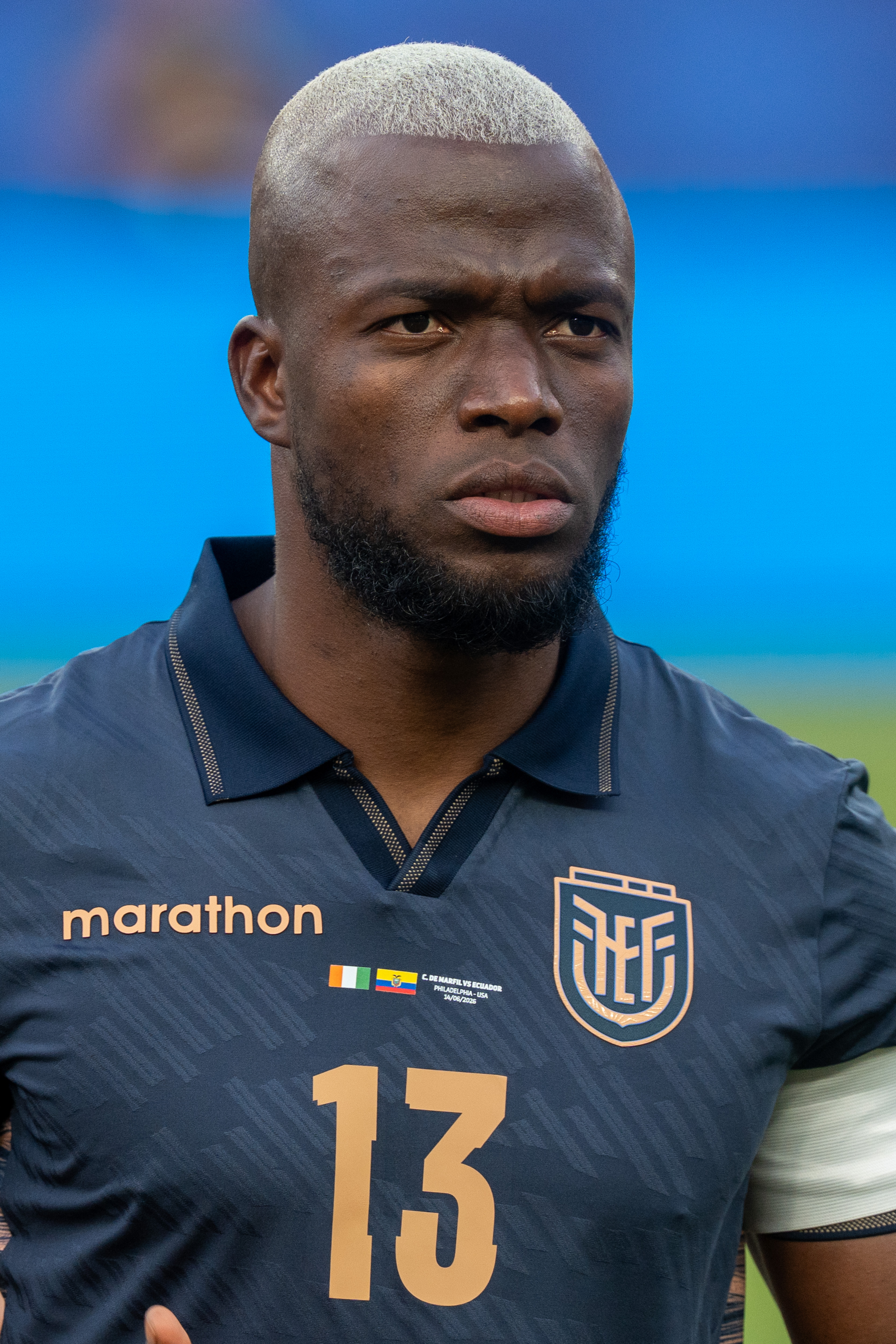
Enner Valencia is Ecuador's most capped player at the FIFA World Cup, appearing in ten matches

Rank	Player	Matches	World Cups
1	Enner Valencia	10	2014, 2022 and 2026
2	Édison Méndez	8	2002, 2006 and 2014
3	Ulises de la Cruz	7	2002 and 2006
3	Antonio Valencia	7	2006 and 2014
3	Moisés Caicedo	7	2022 and 2026
3	Hernán Galíndez	7	2022 and 2026
3	Piero Hincapié	7	2022 and 2026
3	Gonzalo Plata	7	2022 and 2026
3	Ángelo Preciado	7	2022 and 2026
10	Agustín Delgado	6	2002 and 2006
10	Iván Hurtado	6	2002 and 2006
10	Iván Kaviedes	6	2002 and 2006
10	Carlos Tenorio	6	2002 and 2006
10	Edwin Tenorio	6	2002 and 2006
10	Jorge Guagua	6	2006 and 2014
10	Alan Franco	6	2022 and 2026
10	Kevin Rodríguez	6	2022 and 2026

=== Goalscorers ===
Enner Valencia, Ecuador's top goalscorer, netting the first goal of the 2022 FIFA World Cup against Qatar

Player	Goals	2002	2006	2014	2022	2026
Enner Valencia	6			3	3	
Agustín Delgado	3	1	2			
Carlos Tenorio	2		2			
Édison Méndez	1	1				
Iván Kaviedes	1		1			
Moisés Caicedo	1				1	
Nilson Angulo	1					1
Gonzalo Plata	1					1
Total	16	2	5	3	4	2

== Head-to-head record ==
Opponent	Pld	W	D	L	GF	GA	GD	Win %
Costa Rica	1	1	0	0	3	0	+3	100.00
Croatia	1	1	0	0	1	0	+1	100.00
Curaçao	1	0	1	0	0	0	+0	0.00
England	1	0	0	1	0	1	−1	0.00
France	1	0	1	0	0	0	+0	0.00
Germany	2	1	0	1	2	4	−2	50.00
Honduras	1	1	0	0	2	1	+1	100.00
Italy	1	0	0	1	0	2	−2	0.00
Ivory Coast	1	0	0	1	0	1	−1	0.00
Mexico	2	0	0	2	1	4	−3	0.00
Netherlands	1	0	1	0	1	1	+0	0.00
Poland	1	1	0	0	2	0	+2	100.00
Qatar	1	1	0	0	2	0	+2	100.00
Senegal	1	0	0	1	1	2	−1	0.00
Switzerland	1	0	0	1	1	2	−1	0.00
Total	17	6	3	8	16	18	−2	35.29

== See also ==
- Ecuador at the CONCACAF Gold Cup
- Ecuador at the Copa América
- South American nations at the FIFA World Cup
