= Oscar Montañés =

Argentine footballer

Personal information
- Date of birth: 18 April 1912
- Date of death: 1985 (aged 72–73)
- Position: Defender

International career
Years	Team	Apps	(Gls)
1937–1942	Argentina	15	(0)

Oscar Eusebio Montañez (18 April 1912 – 1985) was an Argentine footballer. He played in 15 matches for the Argentina national football team from 1937 to 1942. He was also part of Argentina's squad for the 1942 South American Championship.
