= Guillermo Casanova =

Chilean footballer (1918-1981)

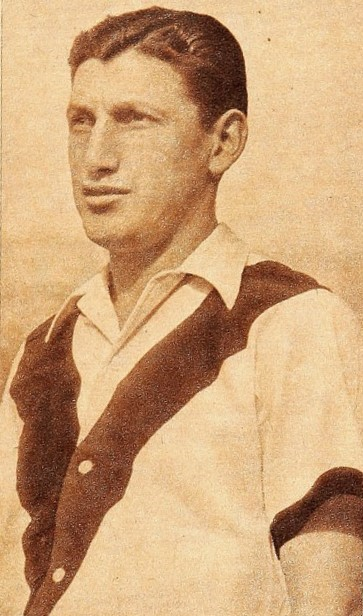

Personal information
- Full name: Guillermo Segundo Casanova Miranda
- Date of birth: 21 May 1918
- Date of death: 16 July 1981 (aged 63)
- Position: Midfielder

International career
Years	Team	Apps	(Gls)
1942	Chile	5	(0)

Guillermo Casanova (21 May 1918 – 16 July 1981) was a Chilean footballer. He played in five matches for the Chile national football team in 1942. He was also part of Chile's squad for the 1942 South American Championship.
