= Ecuador at the CONCACAF Gold Cup =

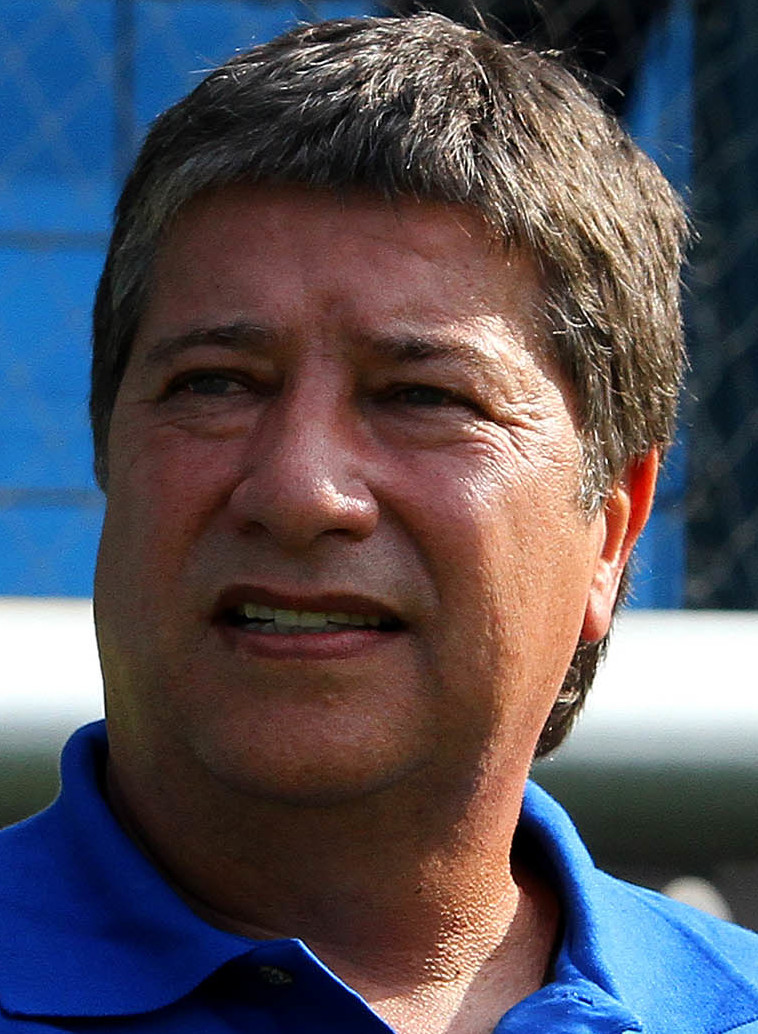
Former Colombian international Hernán Darío Gómez was Ecuador's head coach at the time of the 2002 CONCACAF Gold Cup.

The CONCACAF Gold Cup is North America's major tournament in senior men's football and determines the continental champion. Until 1989, the tournament was known as CONCACAF Championship. It is currently held every two years. From 1996 to 2005, nations from other confederations have regularly joined the tournament as invitees. In earlier editions, the continental championship was held in different countries, but since the inception of the Gold Cup in 1991, the United States are constant hosts or co-hosts.

From 1973 to 1989, the tournament doubled as the confederation's World Cup qualification. CONCACAF's representative team at the FIFA Confederations Cup was decided by a play-off between the winners of the last two tournament editions in 2015 via the CONCACAF Cup, but was then discontinued along with the Confederations Cup.

Since the inaugural tournament in 1963, the Gold Cup was held 28 times and has been won by seven different nations, most often by Mexico (13 titles).

Ecuador have participated as invitees once, in 2002. After one victory and one defeat in the group stage, Ecuador was sent home with a stroke of bad luck; all three teams were equal on both points and goals, and lots were drawn to determine the teams' positions. Haiti and Canada were drawn into first and second place and advanced to the quarter-finals, while Ecuador were eliminated.

== Record at the CONCACAF Championship/Gold Cup ==
=== Record ===
CONCACAF Gold Cup
| Year | Result | Position | Pld | W | D | L | GF | GA |
|---|---|---|---|---|---|---|---|---|
| (United States) 2002 | Group stage | 9th | 2 | 1 | 0 | 1 | 2 | 2 |
| Total | 1/28 | 25/33 | 2 | 1 | 0 | 1 | 2 | 2 |

=== Match overview ===
| Year | Round | Opponent | Result | Ecuador scorers | Venue |
|---|---|---|---|---|---|
| (United States) 2002 | Group stage | Haiti | 0–2 | | Miami |
| (United States) 2002 | Group stage | Canada | 2–0 | A. Aguinaga (2) | Miami |

== 2002 CONCACAF Gold Cup ==
=== Group stage ===
| Team | Pld | W | D | L | GF | GA | GD | Pts |
|---|---|---|---|---|---|---|---|---|
| Haiti | 2 | 1 | 0 | 1 | 2 | 2 | 0 | 3 |
| Canada | 2 | 1 | 0 | 1 | 2 | 2 | 0 | 3 |
| Ecuador | 2 | 1 | 0 | 1 | 2 | 2 | 0 | 3 |

January 19, 2002

| Ecuador | 0–2 | Haiti |
|---|---|---|
| | Report | Méndez 6' (o.g.); Alerte 44' |

Orange Bowl, Miami
Attendance: 12,253
Referee: Carlos Batres (Guatemala)

January 21, 2002

| Canada | 0–2 | Ecuador |
|---|---|---|
| | Report | Aguinaga 88', 90' |

Orange Bowl, Miami
Attendance: 3,827
Referee: Brian Hall (United States)

== Record players ==
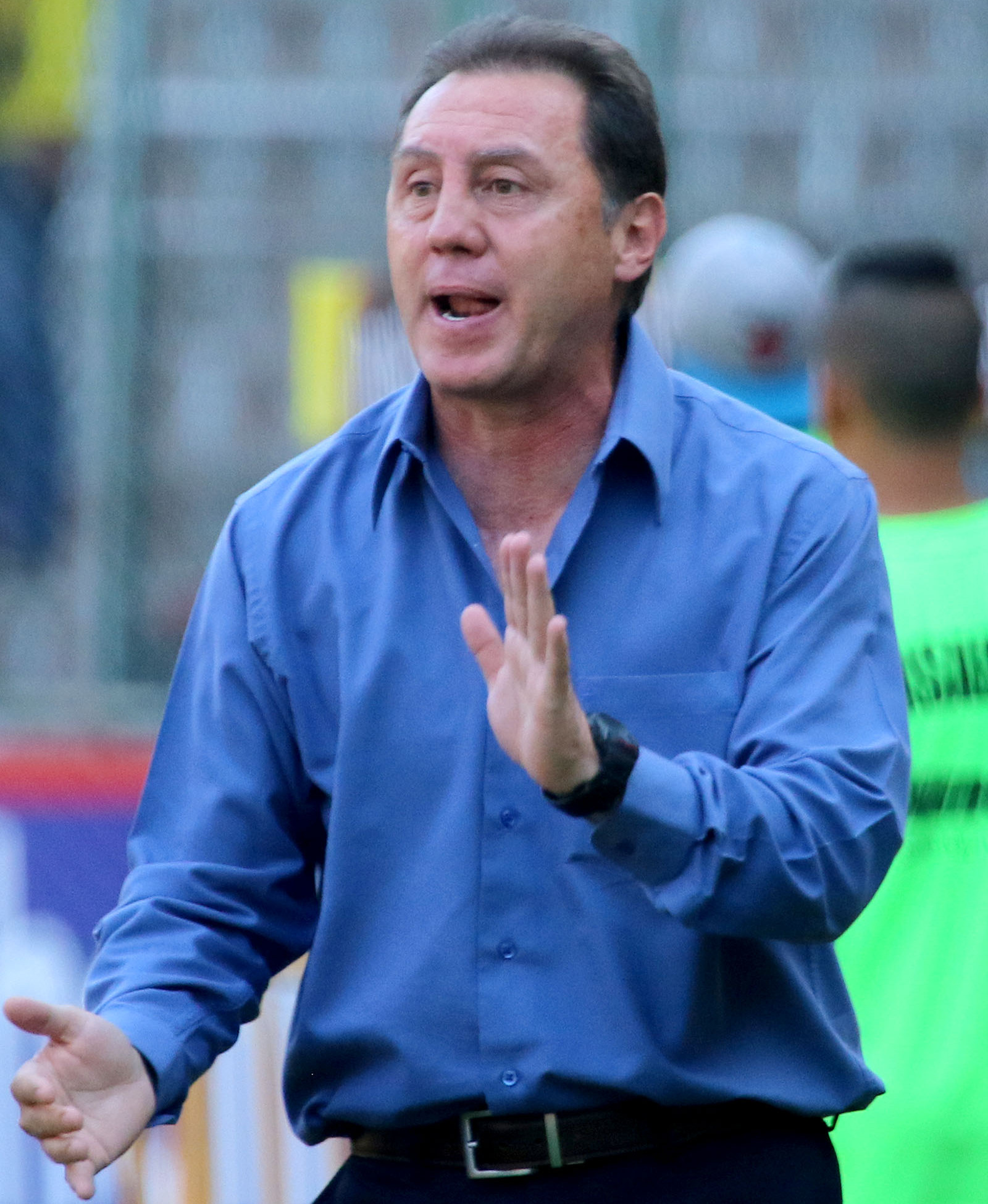
Álex Aguinaga (here as club coach in 2015) played both matches and scored both goals at Ecuador's only Gold Cup participation.

The following ten players have been fielded in both Gold Cup matches for Ecuador:

| Rank | Player | Matches | Gold Cups |
|---|---|---|---|
| 1 | Álex Aguinaga | 2 | 2002 |
| 1 | Nicolás Asencio | 2 | 2002 |
| 1 | José Francisco Cevallos | 2 | 2002 |
| 1 | Cléber Chalá | 2 | 2002 |
| 1 | Ángel Fernández | 2 | 2002 |
| 1 | Luis Gómez | 2 | 2002 |
| 1 | Carlos Ramón Hidalgo | 2 | 2002 |
| 1 | Iván Hurtado | 2 | 2002 |
| 1 | Alfonso Obregón | 2 | 2002 |
| 1 | Edwin Tenorio | 2 | 2002 |

== Goalscorers ==
Both Ecuadorian goals were scored by Álex Aguinaga, late in the match against Canada, one of them per penalty.

== See also ==
- Ecuador at the Copa América
- Ecuador at the FIFA World Cup
