= Dino (footballer, born 1917) =

Brazilian footballer

Personal information
- Full name: Oswaldo Rodolfo da Silva
- Date of birth: 7 July 1917
- Place of birth: São Paulo, Brazil
- Date of death: 7 July 1987 (aged 70)
- Position: Midfielder

Senior career*
Years	Team	Apps	(Gls)
1935–1939	Portuguesa Santista		
1940–1944	Corinthians		
1944–1946	Vasco da Gama		
1946–1947	América		
1947–1948	Corinthians		
1948–1950	Jabaquara		

International career
1942	Brazil	4	(0)
- * Club domestic league appearances and goals

Oswaldo Rodolfo da Silva (7 July 1917 – 7 July 1987), known as Dino, was a Brazilian footballer. He played in four matches for the Brazil national football team in 1942. He was also part of Brazil's squad for the 1942 South American Championship.
