= Begliomini =

Brazilian footballer (1914-2001)

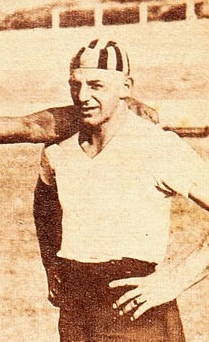

Personal information
- Full name: Pelegrino Adelmo Begliomini
- Date of birth: 27 November 1914
- Date of death: 10 October 2001 (aged 86)
- Position: Defender

International career
Years	Team	Apps	(Gls)
1942–1945	Brazil	6	(0)

Pelegrino Adelmo Begliomini (27 November 1914 – 10 October 2001), known as just Begliomini, was a Brazilian footballer. He played in six matches for the Brazil national football team from 1942 to 1945. He was also part of Brazil's squad for the 1942 South American Championship.
