= Hernán Fernández (Argentine footballer) =

Argentine footballer

Personal information
- Full name: Hernán Fernández
- Date of birth: June 14, 1984 (age 42)
- Place of birth: Río Tercero, Córdoba, Argentina
- Height: 1.86 m (6 ft 1 in)
- Position: Centre back

Team information
- Current team: Sarmiento Resistencia

Senior career*
Years	Team	Apps	(Gls)
2005–2006	Belgrano de Córdoba		
2006–2007	Defensa y Justicia		
2007–2010	Racing Córdoba		
2010–2011	Dinamo Tirana	0	(0)
2011–2013	Racing de Córdoba		
2013–2014	Juventud Antoniana	24	(1)
2014–2015	San Jorge	14	(0)
2015–	Sarmiento Resistencia		
- * Club domestic league appearances and goals

Hernán Fernández (born 14 June 1984 in Río Tercero, Córdoba) is an Argentine football defender. He currently plays for Sarmiento Resistencia.
