= Benito Armingol =

Chilean footballer (1919-1971)

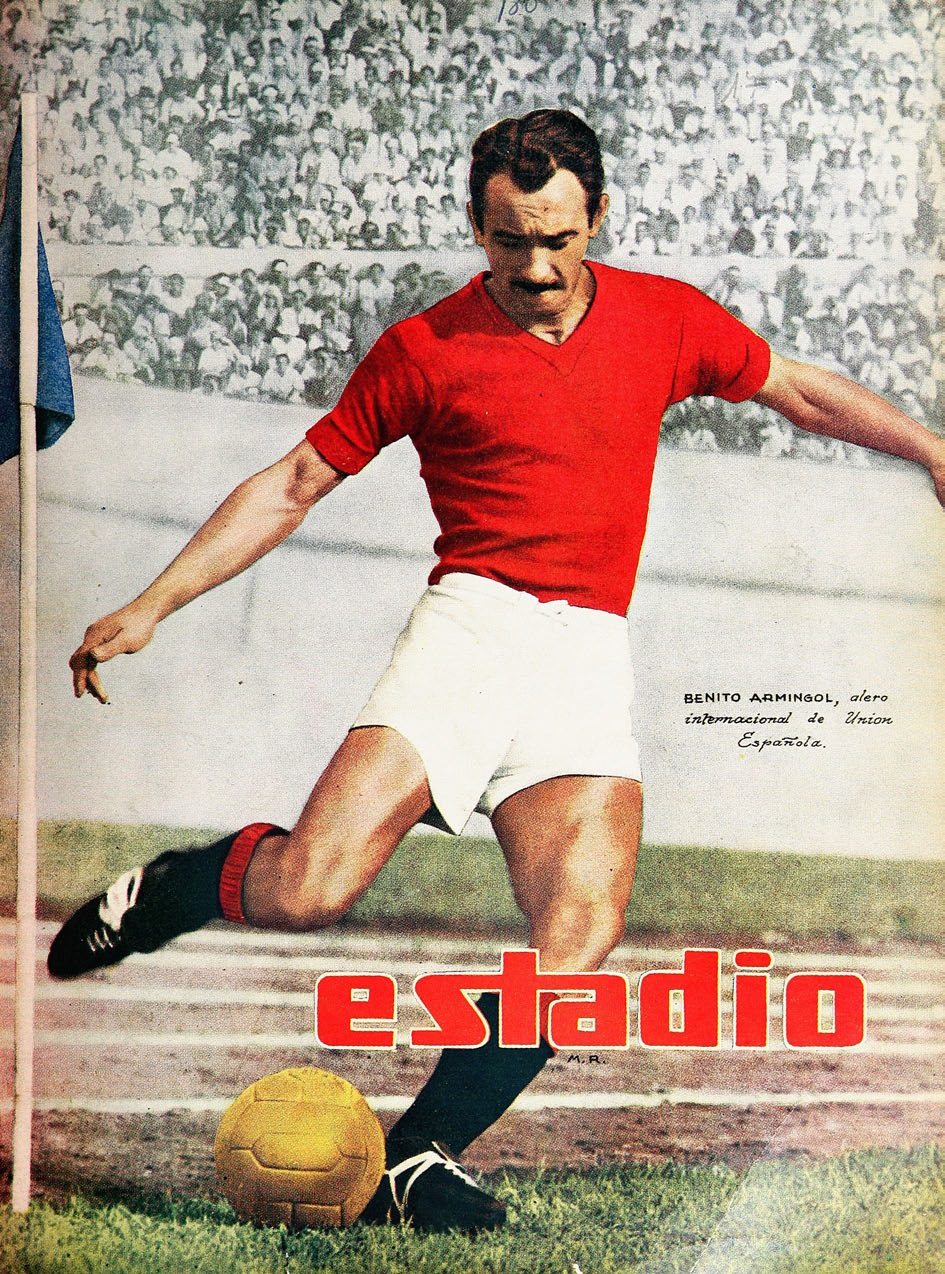

Personal information
- Full name: Benito Armingol García
- Date of birth: 7 September 1919
- Place of birth: Santiago, Chile
- Date of death: 9 November 1971 (aged 52)
- Place of death: Santiago, Chile
- Position: Winger

Youth career
- 1936–1939: Unión Española

Senior career*
Years	Team	Apps	(Gls)
1940–1951	Unión Española		
1953	Unión Española		
Total		239	(90)

International career
1942–1945	Chile	8	(1)
- * Club domestic league appearances and goals

Benito Armingol García (7 September 1919 – 9 November 1971) was a Chilean footballer. He played in eight matches for the Chile national football team from 1942 to 1945. He was also part of Chile's squad for the 1942 South American Championship.

== Career ==
Armingol only played for Unión Española during his professional career. He joined the youth ranks in 1936, made his senior debut in 1940 and was a key player in the first league title in 1943. Retired in 1951, he briefly returned to play in 1953. In total, he made 239 appearances and scored 90 goals.

== Personal life ==
Born in Santiago, Chile, his father, Francisco Armingol Bermejo, was a Spanish trader and his mother was Gregoria García Luis. Died on 9 November 1971, he was laid to rest in the Santiago General Cemetery.
