= Hernán Fernández (Chilean footballer) =

Chilean footballer (1921-2010)

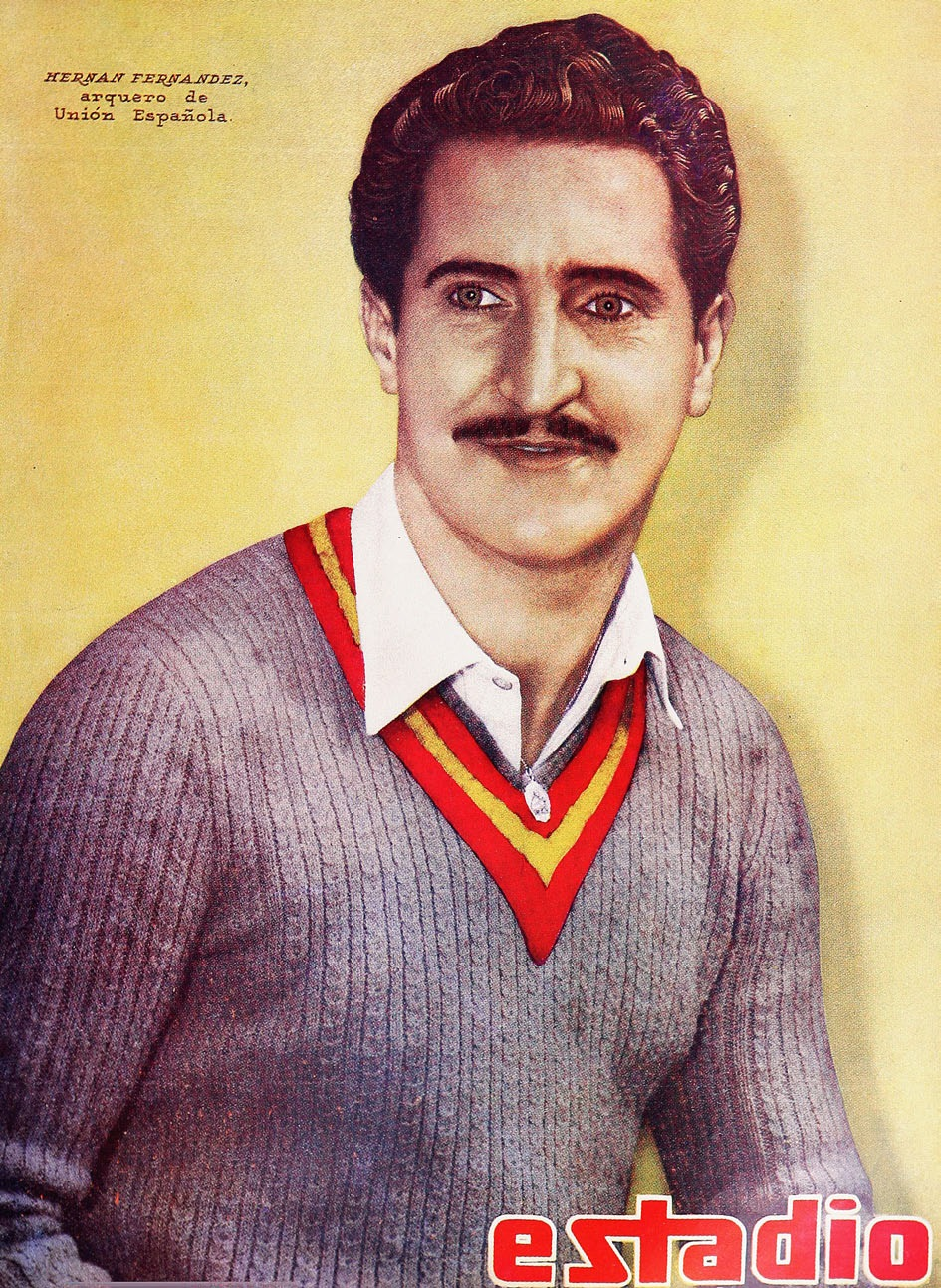
- Fernández in 1951

Personal information
- Full name: Hernán Fernández Vilaspaz
- Date of birth: 17 March 1921
- Place of birth: Santiago, Chile
- Date of death: 5 July 2010 (aged 89)
- Place of death: Santiago, Chile
- Position: Goalkeeper

Youth career
- Instituto Nacional
- 1933–1934: Unión Deportiva Española
- 1935–1937: Unión Española

Senior career*
Years	Team	Apps	(Gls)
1938–1951	Unión Española		
1952–1953	Santiago Morning		
1953	Unión Española		

International career
1942–1952	Chile	10	(0)
- * Club domestic league appearances and goals

Hernán Fernández Vilaspaz (17 March 1921 – 5 July 2010) was a Chilean footballer. He played in ten matches for the Chile national football team from 1942 to 1952. He was also part of Chile's squad for the 1942 South American Championship.

== Career ==
Fernández joined Unión Deportiva Española, the previous club to Unión Española, in 1933 from Instituto Nacional. He made his senior debut with Unión Española in 1938, aged 17, and won the first two Chilean Primera División league titles in 1943 and 1951.

== Personal life ==
Fernández was born in Santiago, Chile, to a Riojan father, Marcelino Fernández Sáez, who came to Chile in 1912, and a Catalonian mother, Pilar Vilaspaz Nalda.
