= Avelino Acosta =

Paraguayan footballer (1917-2008)

Personal information
- Date of birth: 10 November 1917
- Date of death: August 2008 (aged 90)
- Position: Defender

Senior career*
| Years | Team | Apps | (Gls) |
- Club Oriental
- Cerro Porteño
- Atlántida SC
- Atlético Corrales

International career
| 1942 | Paraguay national football team | | |
- * Club domestic league appearances and goals

Andrés Avelino Acosta Parra (10 November 1917 – August 2008) was a Paraguayan Association football player that also defended his country during the Chaco War.

As a footballer, Acosta played for Club Oriental, Cerro Porteño, Atlántida SC and most importantly for Atlético Corrales where he was part of the longest tour by a Paraguay national team around Latin American (it lasted 1 year and 15 days). Acosta also played in several occasions for the Paraguay national football team, including the 1942 Copa America. He played as a defender.
