= Bibiano Zapirain =

Uruguayan footballer (1919-2000)

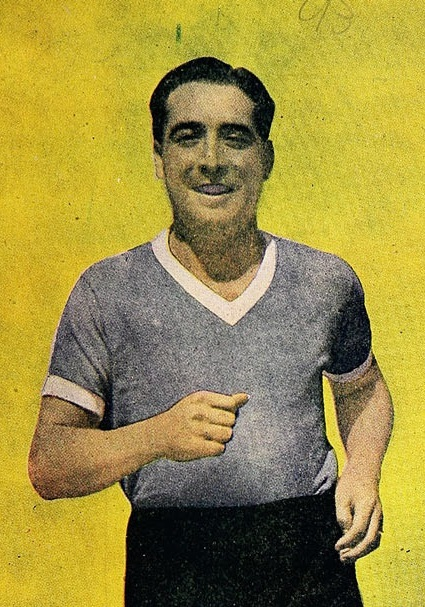

Personal information
- Full name: Bibiano Zapirain
- Date of birth: 2 December 1919
- Place of birth: Tomás Gomensoro, Uruguay
- Date of death: 2 December 2000 (aged 81)
- Place of death: Bogotá, Colombia
- Position: Striker

Senior career*
| Years | Team | Apps | (Gls) |
| 1937 | Selezione di Artigas | | |
| 1939 | Bagé | | |
| 1940–1946 | Nacional | 196 | (118) |
| 1946–1948 | Internazionale | 58 | (18) |
| 1950 | Nacional | | |
| 1951–1952 | Cúcuta Deportivo | | |
| 1953 | Nacional | | |
| 1955–1956 | Cúcuta Deportivo | | |

International career
| 1942–1946 | Uruguay | 21 | (5) |
Medal record
Men's football
Representing Uruguay
South American Championship
| Winner | 1942 Uruguay |
- * Club domestic league appearances and goals

Bibiano Zapirain (2 December 1919 – 2 December 2000) was a Uruguayan footballer.

== Honours ==
Nacional

- Primera División: 6

1940, 1941, 1942, 1943, 1950, 1952

Uruguay

- Copa América: 1

1942
