= Napoleón Medina =

Ecuadorian footballer (1919-2005)

Personal information
- Date of birth: 26 November 1919
- Date of death: 24 February 2005 (aged 85)
- Position: Goalkeeper

International career
Years	Team	Apps	(Gls)
1942–1947	Ecuador	14	(0)

Napoleón Medina (26 November 1919 – 24 February 2005) was an Ecuadorian footballer. He played in 14 matches for the Ecuador national football team from 1942 to 1947. He was also part of Ecuador's squad for the 1945 South American Championship.
