= Luis Castro (footballer, born 1921) =

Uruguayan footballer (1921-2002)

Luis Ernesto Castro
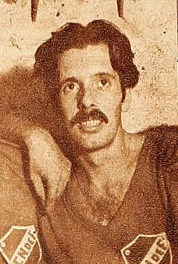

Personal information
- Full name: Luis Ernesto Castro Sánchez
- Date of birth: 31 July 1921
- Place of birth: Montevideo, Uruguay
- Date of death: 17 December 2002 (aged 81)
- Position: Forward

Senior career*
Years	Team	Apps	(Gls)
1936–1950	Nacional	274	(166)

International career
1942–1954	Uruguay	19	(4)
- * Club domestic league appearances and goals

Luis Ernesto Castro Sánchez (31 July 1921 – 17 December 2002), nicknamed Mandrake, was a Uruguayan football forward who played for Uruguay in the 1954 FIFA World Cup. He also played for Club Nacional de Football.
