= Ángel Perucca =

Argentine footballer

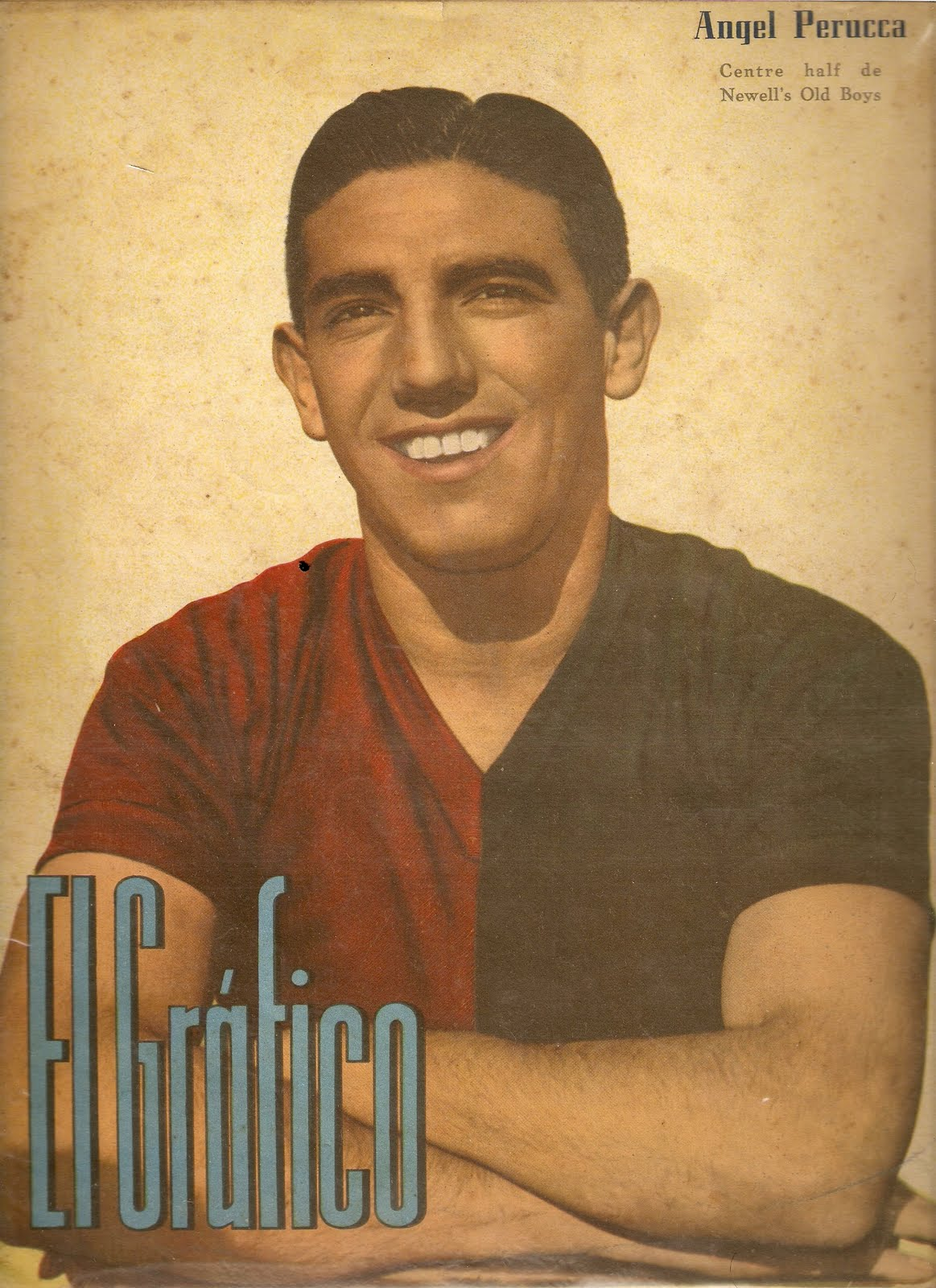

Personal information
- Date of birth: 19 August 1918
- Date of death: 19 September 1981 (aged 63)
- Position: Midfielder

International career
Years	Team	Apps	(Gls)
1940–1947	Argentina	25	(2)

Ángel Perucca (19 August 1918 – 19 September 1981) was an Argentine footballer. He played in 25 matches for the Argentina national football team from 1940 to 1947. He was also part of Argentina's squad for the 1945 South American Championship.
