= 1942 South American Championship =

Football tournament

Tournament details
- Host country: Uruguay
- Dates: 10 January – 7 February
- Teams: 7 (from 1 confederation)
- Venue: 1 (in 1 host city)

Final positions
- Champions: Uruguay (8th title)
- Runners-up: Argentina
- Third place: Brazil
- Fourth place: Paraguay

Tournament statistics
- Matches played: 21
- Goals scored: 81 (3.86 per match)
- Top scorer(s): (Argentina) Herminio Masantonio (Argentina) José Manuel Moreno (7 goals each)

The seventeenth edition of the South American Championship, an association football competition, was held in Montevideo, Uruguay, from 10 January to 7 February.

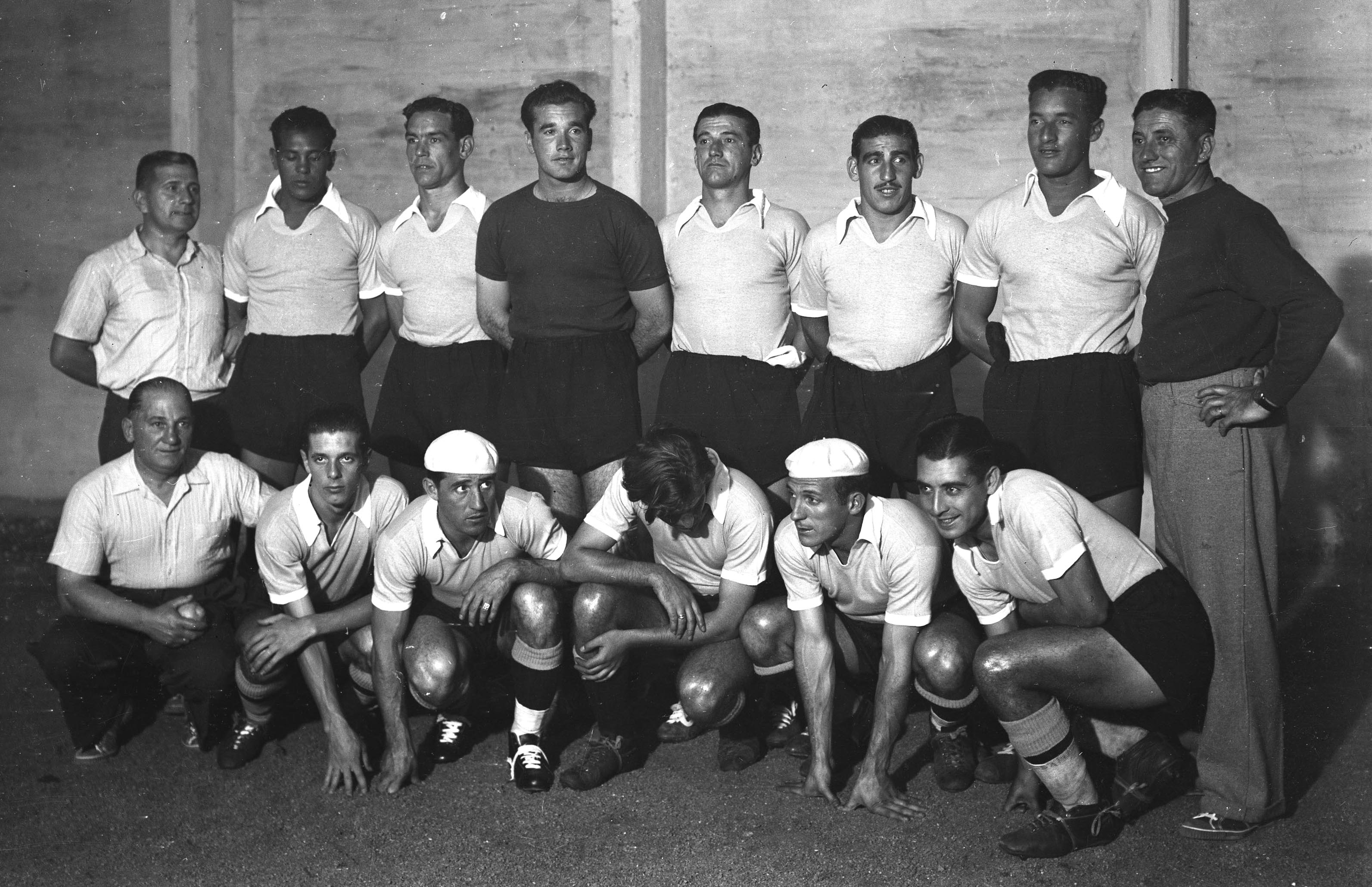
The Uruguayan squad, champions

For the first time seven teams took part of the event; the participating countries were Argentina, Brazil, Chile, Ecuador, Paraguay, Peru, and Uruguay.

Bolivia, and Colombia withdrew from the tournament.

The tournament featured a match between Argentina and Ecuador in which Argentina's José Manuel Moreno surpassed the 500-goal mark for goals in Copa América history, scoring 5 in a 12–0 drubbing of Ecuador. As of 2015, the 12-goal difference of that match remains the widest ever in Copa Américas. José Manuel Moreno and Herminio Masantonio of Argentina were joint top scorers of the tournament, with 7 goals each.

== Venues ==
Montevideo
Estadio Centenario
Capacity: 65,235
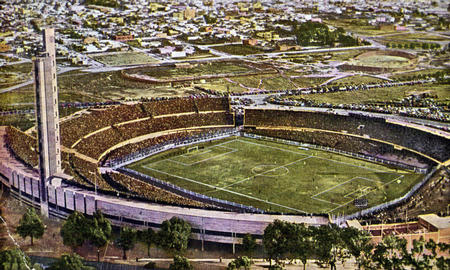

== Final round ==
Each team played against each of the other teams. Two points were awarded for a win, one point for a draw and no (0) points for a defeat.

Team	Pld	W	D	L	GF	GA	GD	Pts
Uruguay	6	6	0	0	21	2	+19	12
Argentina	6	5	0	1	21	6	+15	10
Brazil	6	3	1	2	15	7	+8	7
Paraguay	6	2	2	2	11	10	+1	6
Peru	6	1	2	3	5	10	−5	4
Chile	6	1	1	4	4	15	−11	3
Ecuador	6	0	0	6	4	31	−27	0

10 January 1942

Uruguay	6–1	Chile
L. E. Castro 7', 76'; O. Varela 12'; Ciocca 15'; Zapirain 37'; Porta 54'		Contreras 1'

Estadio Centenario, Montevideo
Referee: José Bartolomé Macías (Argentina)

11 January 1942

Argentina	4–3	Paraguay
Sandoval 9'; Masantonio 30', 47'; Perucca 88'		Sánchez 59'; Aveiro 75', 86'

Estadio Centenario, Montevideo
Referee: José Ferreira Lemos (Brazil)

14 January 1942

Brazil	6–1	Chile
Patesko 1', 78'; Pirillo 23', 63', 86'; Cláudio 66'		Domínguez 35'

Estadio Centenario, Montevideo
Referee: Aníbal Tejada (Uruguay)

17 January 1942

Argentina	2–1	Brazil
E. García 3'; Masantonio 27'		Servílio 37'

Estadio Centenario, Montevideo
Referee: Enrique Cuenca (Peru)

18 January 1942

Uruguay	7–0	Ecuador
Zapirain 1'; Gambetta 13'; S. Varela 16', 24', 29'; Porta 23', 42'

Estadio Centenario, Montevideo
Referee: Marcos Gerinaldo Rojas (Paraguay)

18 January 1942

Paraguay	1–1	Peru
Barrios 35'		Magallanes 1'

Estadio Centenario, Montevideo
Referee: José Bartolomé Macías (Argentina)

21 January 1942

Brazil	2–1	Peru
Amorim 43', 56'		Fernández 73'

Estadio Centenario, Montevideo
Referee: Marcos Gerinaldo Rojas (Paraguay)

22 January 1942

Paraguay	2–0	Chile
Barrios 33'; Baudo Franco 54'

Estadio Centenario, Montevideo
Referee: José Ferreira Lemos (Brazil)

22 January 1942

Argentina	12–0	Ecuador
E. García 2'; Moreno 12', 16', 22', 32', 89'; Pedernera 25'; Masantonio 54', 65', 68', 70'; Perucca 88'

Estadio Centenario, Montevideo
Referee: Manuel Soto (Chile)

24 January 1942

Uruguay	1–0	Brazil
S. Varela 32'

Estadio Centenario, Montevideo
Referee: Marcos Gerinaldo Rojas (Paraguay)

25 January 1942

Paraguay	3–1	Ecuador
Baudo Franco 5'; Mingo 57'; Ibarrola 62'		Jiménez 46'

Estadio Centenario, Montevideo
Referee: Manuel Soto (Chile)

25 January 1942

Argentina	3–1	Peru
Heredia 12'; Moreno 65', 72'		Fernández 17'

Estadio Centenario, Montevideo
Referee: Aníbal Tejada (Uruguay)

28 January 1942

Peru	2–1	Ecuador
Quiñónez 32'; Guzmán 62'		Jiménez 52'

Estadio Centenario, Montevideo
Referee: Aníbal Tejada (Uruguay)

28 January 1942

Uruguay	3–1	Paraguay
S. Varela 9'; Porta 26'; Ciocca 65'		Barrios 58'

Estadio Centenario, Montevideo
Referee: Enrique Cuenca (Peru)

31 January 1942

Argentina	0–0	Chile

Estadio Centenario, Montevideo
Referee: Enrique Cuenca (Peru)
Chile left the pitch on the 43rd minute in protest of the dreadful referee performance.
Argentina was awarded a victory but with no goals.

31 January 1942

Brazil	5–1	Ecuador
Tim 10'; Pirillo 12', 29', 76'; Zizinho 60'		Álvarez 19' (pen.)

Estadio Centenario, Montevideo
Referee: José Bartolomé Macías (Argentina)

1 February 1942

Uruguay	3–0	Peru
Chirimini 47'; L. E. Castro 54'; Porta 77'

Estadio Centenario, Montevideo
Referee: José Bartolomé Macías (Argentina)

5 February 1942

Chile	2–1	Ecuador
Domínguez 20'; Armingol 42'		Alcívar 5'

Estadio Centenario, Montevideo
Referee: Marcos Gerinaldo Rojas (Paraguay)

5 February 1942

Brazil	1–1	Paraguay
Zizinho 5'		Baudo Franco 23'

Estadio Centenario, Montevideo
Referee: José Bartolomé Macías (Argentina)

7 February 1942

Chile	0–0	Peru

Estadio Centenario, Montevideo
Referee: José Bartolomé Macías (Argentina)

7 February 1942

Uruguay	1–0	Argentina
Zapirain 57'

Estadio Centenario, Montevideo
Referee: Marcos Gerinaldo Rojas (Paraguay)

== Result ==
1942 South American Championship champions

Uruguay
Eighth title

== Goal scorers ==
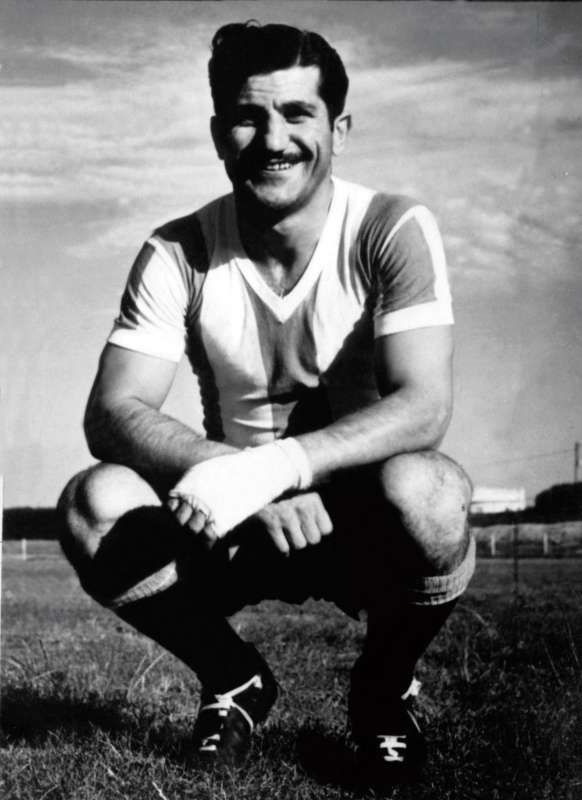
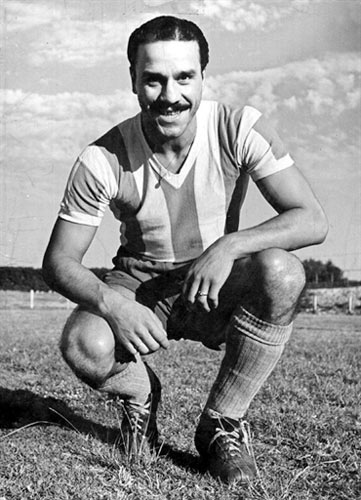
Herminio Masantonio (left) and José M. Moreno, top scorers with 7 goals each

7 goals

- (Argentina) Herminio Masantonio
- (Argentina) José Manuel Moreno

6 goals

- (Brazil) Sylvio Pirillo

5 goals

- (Uruguay) Roberto Porta
- (Uruguay) Severino Varela

3 goals

- (Paraguay) Marcial Barrios
- (Paraguay) Fabio Baudo Franco
- (Uruguay) Luis Castro
- (Uruguay) Bibiano Zapirain

2 goals

- (Argentina) Enrique García
- (Argentina) Ángel Perucca
- (Brazil) Pedro Amorim
- (Brazil) Patesko
- (Brazil) Zizinho
- (Chile) Alfonso Domínguez
- (Ecuador) José María Jiménez
- (Paraguay) Ruben Aveiro
- (Peru) Teodoro Fernández
- (Uruguay) Anibal Ciocca

1 goal

- (Argentina) Juan Carlos Heredia
- (Argentina) Adolfo Pedernera
- (Argentina) Sandoval
- (Brazil) Cláudio
- (Brazil) Servílio
- (Brazil) Tim
- (Chile) Benito Armingol
- (Chile) Armando Contreras
- (Ecuador) Marino Alcívar
- (Ecuador) Enrique Álvarez
- (Paraguay) Gorgonio Ibarrola
- (Paraguay) Eduardo Mingo
- (Paraguay) Vicente Sánchez
- (Peru) Luis Guzmán
- (Peru) Quiñónez
- (Peru) Adelfo Magallanes
- (Uruguay) Chirimini
- (Uruguay) Schubert Gambetta
- (Uruguay) Obdulio Varela
