= 1935 South American Championship squads =

List of footballers

The following squads were named for the 1935 South American Championship that took place in Peru.

== Argentina ==
Head coach: (Argentina) Manuel Seoane

No.	Pos.	Player	Date of birth (age)	Caps	Goals	Club
—	DF	Jorge Alberti	18 May 1912 (aged 22)	0	0	(Argentine Football Association) Huracán
—	FW	Arturo Arrieta	12 June 1911 (aged 23)	2	0	(Argentine Football Association) San Lorenzo
—	FW	Ricardo Barraza		0	0	(Argentine Football Association) Chacarita Juniors
—	GK	Fernando Bello	29 November 1910 (aged 24)	1	0	(Argentine Football Association) Independiente
—	MF	Antonio Campilongo	18 November 1911 (aged 23)	0	0	(Argentine Football Association) Platense
—	FW	Agustín Cosso	10 September 1909 (aged 25)	0	0	(Argentine Football Association) Vélez Sarsfield
—	DF	Rodolfo De Jonge	1 January 1909 (aged 26)	1	0	(Argentine Football Association) Independiente
—	DF	Antonio De Mare	11 December 1909 (aged 25)	0	0	(Argentine Football Association) Racing Club
—	FW	Diego García	23 January 1907 (aged 27)	0	0	(Argentine Football Association) San Lorenzo
—	DF	Lorenzo Gilli	28 May 1905 (aged 29)	0	0	(Argentine Football Association) San Lorenzo
—	GK	Sebastián Gualco	26 April 1912 (aged 22)	0	0	(Argentine Football Association) San Lorenzo
—	MF	Miguel Ángel Lauri	29 August 1908 (aged 26)	5	0	(Argentine Football Association) Estudiantes (LP)
—	FW	Herminio Masantonio	5 August 1910 (aged 24)	0	0	(Argentine Football Association) Huracán
—	MF	José María Minella	6 August 1909 (aged 25)	3	0	(Argentine Football Association) Gimnasia y Esgrima (LP)
—	MF	Mario Pajoni		0	0	(Argentine Football Association) Platense
—	MF	Antonio Sastre	27 April 1911 (aged 23)	2	0	(Argentine Football Association) Independiente
—	MF	Roberto Sbarra	8 August 1912 (aged 22)	0	0	(Argentine Football Association) Estudiantes (LP)
—	DF	Arturo Scarcella		2	0	(Argentine Football Association) Racing Club
—	DF	Carlos Wilson	14 August 1912 (aged 22)	0	0	(Argentine Football Association) Talleres (RE)
—	FW	Vicente Zito	24 November 1912 (aged 22)	2	0	(Argentine Football Association) Racing Club

== Chile ==
Head coach: (Uruguay) Pedro Mazullo

No.	Pos.	Player	Date of birth (age)	Caps	Goals	Club
—	MF	Carlos Aranda		0	0	(Football Federation of Chile) Audax Italiano
—	MF	Enrique Araneda	11 November 1907 (aged 27)	0	0	(Football Federation of Chile) Audax Italiano
—	FW	José Avendaño	8 February 1912 (aged 22)	0	0	(Football Federation of Chile) Magallanes
—	FW	Moisés Avilés	12 February 1909 (aged 25)	0	0	(Football Federation of Chile) Audax Italiano
—	GK	Isaías Azerman	21 July 1912 (aged 22)	0	0	(Football Federation of Chile) Audax Italiano
—	FW	Arturo Carmona	28 September 1909 (aged 25)	0	0	(Football Federation of Chile) Magallanes
—	DF	Ascanio Cortés	5 July 1914 (aged 20)	0	0	(Football Federation of Chile) Audax Italiano
—	GK	Roberto Cortés	2 February 1905 (aged 29)	6	0	(Football Federation of Chile) Colo-Colo
—	FW	Carlos Giudice	3 June 1906 (aged 28)	0	0	(Football Federation of Chile) Audax Italiano
—	MF	Guillermo Gornall	31 August 1907 (aged 27)	0	0	(Football Federation of Chile) Audax Italiano
—	DF	Guillermo Riveros	10 February 1906 (aged 28)	3	0	(Football Federation of Chile) Audax Italiano
—	MF	Eduardo Schneeberger	27 January 1911 (aged 23)	0	0	(Football Federation of Chile) Colo-Colo
—	MF	Enrique Sorrel	3 February 1912 (aged 22)	0	0	(Football Federation of Chile) Colo-Colo
—	MF	Arturo Torres	20 October 1906 (aged 28)	6	0	(Football Federation of Chile) Magallanes
—	DF	Quintín Vargas	13 October 1905 (aged 29)	0	0	(Football Federation of Chile) Magallanes
—	FW	Carlos Vidal	24 February 1902 (aged 32)	3	2	(Football Federation of Chile) Magallanes
—	DF	Conrado Welsh	26 March 1908 (aged 26)	0	0	(Football Federation of Chile) Colo-Colo

== Peru ==
Head coach: (Peru) Telmo Carbajo

No.	Pos.	Player	Date of birth (age)	Caps	Goals	Club
—	FW	Jorge Alcalde	5 October 1911 (aged 23)	0	0	(Peruvian Football Federation) Sport Boys
—	MF	Vicente Arce	22 January 1910 (aged 24)	0	0	(Peruvian Football Federation) Universitario de Deportes
—	DF	Mario de las Casas	31 January 1901 (aged 33)	2	0	(Peruvian Football Federation) Atlético Chalaco
—	MF	Alberto Denegri	7 August 1906 (aged 28)	5	0	(Peruvian Football Federation) Universitario de Deportes
—	DF	Arturo Fernández	3 February 1910 (aged 24)	0	0	(Peruvian Football Federation) Universitario de Deportes
—	FW	Teodoro Fernández	20 May 1913 (aged 21)	0	0	(Peruvian Football Federation) Universitario de Deportes
—	MF	Domingo García	30 November 1904 (aged 30)	1	0	(Peruvian Football Federation) Alianza Lima
—	MF	Eulogio García	11 March 1911 (aged 23)	0	0	(Peruvian Football Federation) Alianza Lima
—	FW	Jorge Góngora	12 October 1906 (aged 28)	1	0	(Football Federation of Chile) Unión Española
—	FW	José María Lavalle	5 June 1911 (aged 23)	5	0	(Peruvian Football Federation) Alianza Lima
—	DF	Narciso León		0	0	(Peruvian Football Federation) Alianza Lima
—	FW	Alberto Montellanos	14 March 1899 (aged 35)	3	1	(Peruvian Football Federation) Alianza Lima
—	FW	José Morales	30 October 1909 (aged 25)	0	0	(Peruvian Football Federation) Alianza Lima
—	FW	Lizardo Rodríguez Nue	30 August 1910 (aged 19)	0	0	(Peruvian Football Federation) Sportivo Tarapacá Ferrocarril
—	MF	Lorenzo Pacheco	10 August 1919 (aged 15)	0	0	(Peruvian Football Federation) KDT Nacional
—	MF	Juan Rivero	24 June 1909 (aged 25)	0	0	(Peruvian Football Federation) Atlético Chalaco
—	MF	Carlos Tovar	2 April 1914 (aged 20)	0	0	(Peruvian Football Federation) Universitario de Deportes
—	GK	Juan Humberto Valdivieso	6 May 1910 (aged 24)	1	0	(Peruvian Football Federation) Alianza Lima
—	FW	Alejandro Villanueva	4 June 1908 (aged 26)	4	1	(Peruvian Football Federation) Alianza Lima

== Uruguay ==
Head coach: (Uruguay) Raúl Blanco

No.	Pos.	Player	Date of birth (age)	Caps	Goals	Club
—	MF	Miguel Ángel Andreolo	6 September 1912 (aged 22)	0	0	(Uruguayan Football Association) Nacional
—	FW	Juan Peregrino Anselmo	30 April 1902 (aged 32)	7	3	(Uruguayan Football Association) Peñarol
—	GK	Enrique Ballestrero	18 January 1905 (aged 29)	10	0	(Uruguayan Football Association) Rampla Juniors
—	MF	Braulio Castro	20 March 1913 (aged 21)	3	0	(Uruguayan Football Association) Peñarol
—	FW	Hector Castro	29 November 1904 (aged 30)	19	16	(Uruguayan Football Association) Nacional
—	FW	Aníbal Ciocca	23 June 1912 (aged 22)	0	0	(Uruguayan Football Association) Nacional
—	MF	Luis Denis	1 January 1912 (aged 23)	1	0	(Uruguayan Football Association) Montevideo Wanderers
—	FW	Enrique Fernández	10 June 1912 (aged 22)	4	1	(Uruguayan Football Association) Nacional
—	MF	Lorenzo Fernández	20 May 1900 (aged 34)	21	4	(Uruguayan Football Association) Peñarol
—	MF	Conrado Häberli		2	1	(Uruguayan Football Association) Rampla Juniors
—	GK	Héctor Macchiavello	21 September 1903 (aged 31)	0	0	(Uruguayan Football Association) Racing de Montevideo
—	DF	Agenor Muñiz	2 February 1910 (aged 24)	1	0	(Uruguayan Football Association) Montevideo Wanderers
—	DF	José Nasazzi	24 May 1901 (aged 33)	34	0	(Uruguayan Football Association) Nacional
—	DF	Miguel Juan Olivera		0	0	(Uruguayan Football Association) River Plate
—	MF	Marcelino Pérez	23 October 1912 (aged 22)	1	0	(Uruguayan Football Association) Nacional
—	FW	Juan Emilio Píriz	1 January 1908 (aged 27)	7	1	(Uruguayan Football Association) Defensor Sporting
—	FW	José Alberto Taboada		0	0	(Uruguayan Football Association) Montevideo Wanderers
—	MF	Erebo Zunino		2	0	(Uruguayan Football Association) Peñarol
