= List of Uruguay international footballers born outside Uruguay =

This is a list of football players who have represented the Uruguay national football team in international football since 1900 and were born outside Uruguay.

== List of Players ==
The following players:

1. have played at least one game for the full (senior male) Uruguay national team since 1900; and
2. were born outside Uruguay.

This list includes players who have dual citizenship with Uruguay and/or have become naturalised Uruguayan citizens. The players are ordered per modern-day country of birth.

List of players
Country of birth	Player	Caps	Goals	Period
Argentina	Atilio García	6	5	1945–1946
Argentina	Juan Eduardo Hohberg	9	3	1954–1959
Argentina	Gustavo Matosas	7	1	1987–1992
Argentina	Fernando Muslera	137	0	2009–2026
Argentina	Marcelino Pérez	3	0	1933–1935
Argentina	Juan José Rodríguez	1	0	1962
Brazil	Matías Aguirregaray	6	0	2012–2014
Brazil	Damián Rodríguez	3	0	2000–2002
Ecuador	Alberto Spencer	6	1	1962–1967
England	Robert Sidney Buck	3	2	1909–1910
England	Leonard Crossley	2	0	1910–1911
England	William Leslie Poole	1	1	1901
Italy	Nicolás Fonseca	6	0	2024–
Italy	Ernesto Vidal	8	2	1950–1952
Lithuania	Ladislao Brazionis	5	0	1956
Paraguay	Abraham Rébori	1	0	1919
Peru	Juan Joya	1	0	1965
Scotland	John Harley	22	0	1909–1916
Spain	Pedro Cea	28	13	1923–1932
Spain	Lorenzo Fernández	31	4	1925–1935
Spain	Rodrigo Zalazar	7	2	2023–

=== Players with only youth caps ===
- Pablo Alcoba (born in Madrid, Spain) (2025–)
- Álvaro Rodríguez (born in Palamós, Spain) (2026–)

== With local national team ==
In April 2024, it was announced the creation of a Uruguay local national team to play international matches other than the official Uruguay national team.

The following players:

1. have played at least one game for the Uruguay local national team since 2024; and
2. were born outside Uruguay.

List of players
Country of birth	Player	Caps	Goals	Period
Brazil	Lucas Monzón	2	0	2024
Italy	Matias Fonseca	2	0	2024

== See also ==
- List of Uruguay international footballers
