= History of the FIFA World Cup =

FIFA World Cup history

The FIFA World Cup was first held in 1930, when FIFA, the world's football governing body, decided to stage an international men's football tournament under the era of FIFA president Jules Rimet who put this idea into place. Rimet, the president of FIFA from 1921 to 1954, was appreciated so much for bringing the idea of FIFA to life that in 1946 the trophy was named the Jules Rimet Cup instead of the World Cup Trophy. The inaugural edition, held in 1930, was contested as a final tournament of only thirteen teams invited by the organization. Since then, the World Cup has experienced successive expansions and format remodeling, with its current 48-team final tournament preceded by a two-year qualifying process involving over 200 teams worldwide.

== International football before 1930 ==
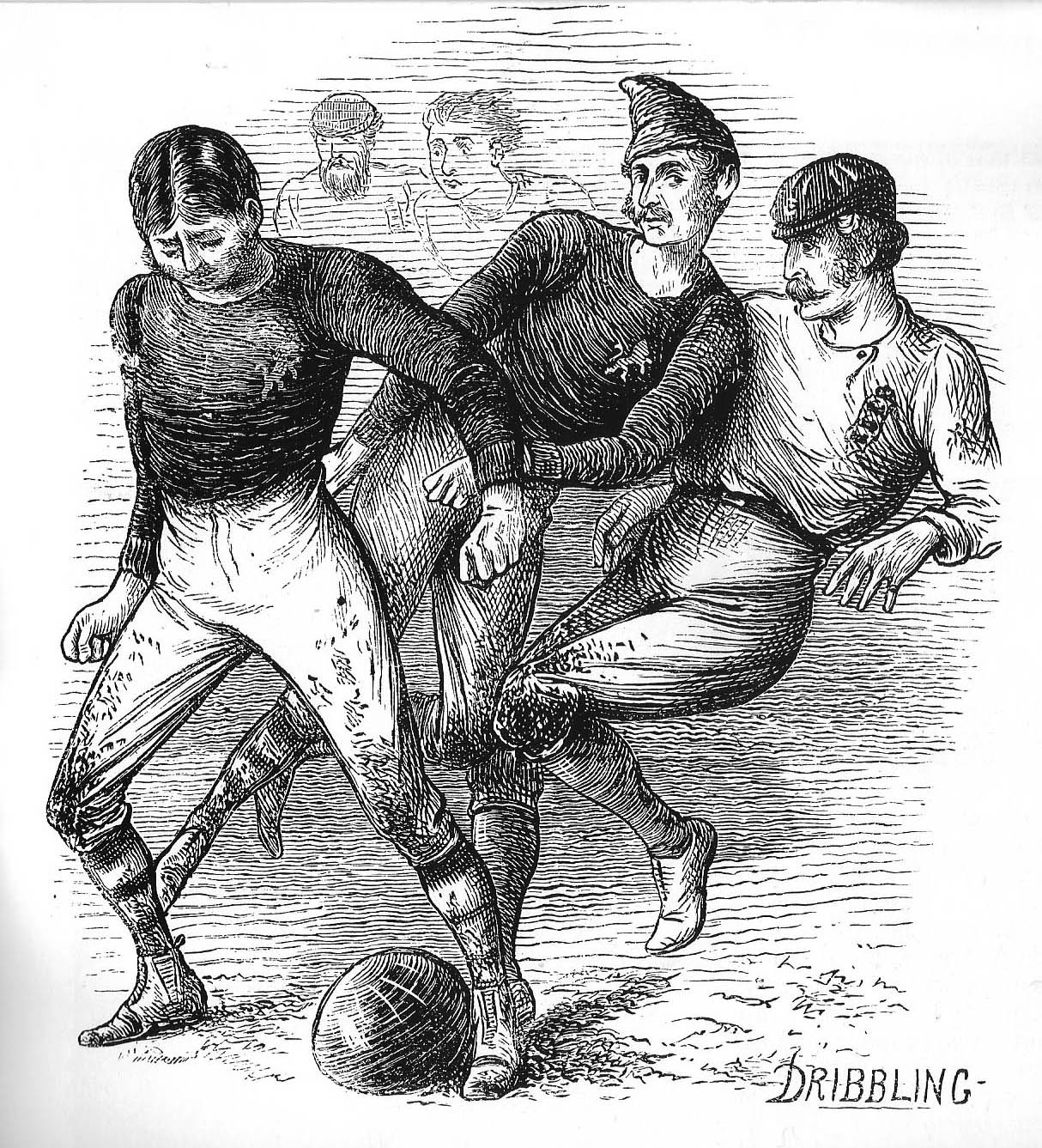
Illustration of the first international match between England and Scotland, 1872

The first official international football match was played in 1872 in Glasgow between Scotland and England, although at this stage the sport was rarely played outside Great Britain.

At the end of the 19th century, games that were considered the "football world championship" were meetings between leading English and Scottish clubs, like the 1895 game between Sunderland A.F.C. and the Heart of Midlothian F.C., which Sunderland won.

By the twentieth century, football had gained ground all around the world and national football associations were being founded. The first official international match outside the British Isles was played between Uruguay and Argentina in Montevideo in July 1902. The Fédération Internationale de Football Association (FIFA) was founded in Paris on 21 May 1904 – comprising football associations from France, Belgium (the preceding two teams having played their first national against each other earlier in the month), Denmark, the Netherlands, Spain, Sweden, and Switzerland, with Germany pledging to join.

As football began to increase in popularity, it was contested as an IOC-recognized Olympic sport at the 1900 and 1904 Summer Olympics, as well as at the 1906 Intercalated Games, before becoming an official FIFA-supervised Olympic competition at the 1908 Summer Olympics. Organised by England's Football Association, the event was for amateur players only and was regarded suspiciously as a show rather than a competition. The England national amateur football team won the event in both 1908 and 1912.

There was an attempt made by FIFA to organize an international football tournament between nations outside of the Olympic framework in 1906 and this took place in Switzerland. These were very early days for international football and the official history of FIFA describes the competition as having been a failure.

With the Olympic event continuing to be contested only between amateur teams, competitions involving professional teams also started to appear. The Torneo Internazionale Stampa Sportiva, held in Turin in 1908, was one of the first, and the following year; Sir Thomas Lipton organized the Sir Thomas Lipton Trophy, also held in Turin. Both tournaments were contested between individual clubs (not national teams), each one of which represented an entire nation. For this reason, neither was really a direct forerunner of the World Cup, but notwithstanding that, the Thomas Lipton Trophy is sometimes described as The First World Cup, at the expense of its less well-known Italian predecessor.

In 1914, FIFA agreed to recognize the Olympic tournament as a "world football championship for amateurs", and took responsibility for organizing the event. However, the outbreak of the First World War led to the cancellation of the 1916 Summer Olympics. The tournament that was played that year instead was the inaugural edition of the competition now known as the Copa América. That same year, CONMEBOL, the South American continental confederation, was founded.

Olympic football resumed at the 1920 Summer Olympics, won by Belgium. Uruguay won the tournaments in 1924 and 1928.

== Beginning of the World Cup ==
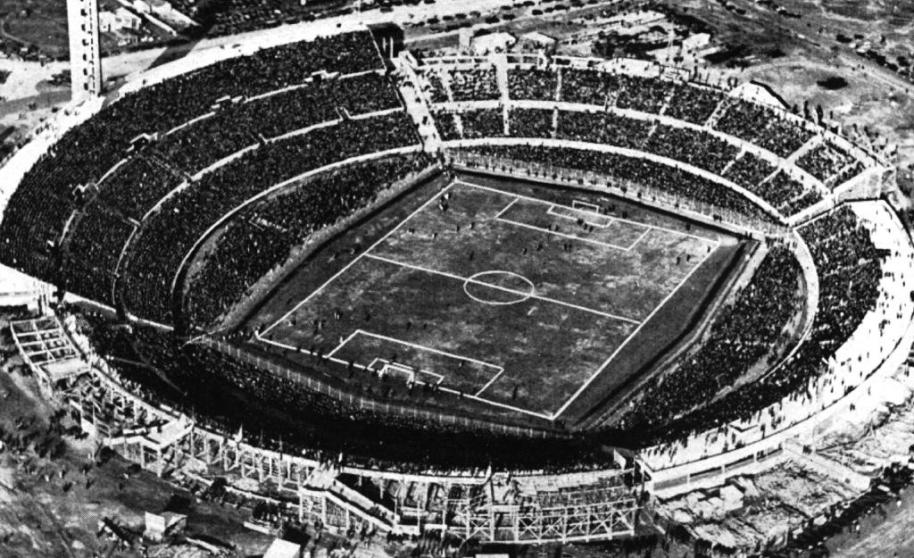
Centenario Stadium in the Uruguayan city of Montevideo, stage of the final of the first FIFA World Cup in 1930

Eventually, FIFA made the decision to stage their own international tournament. FIFA president Jules Rimet thus set about organizing the inaugural World Cup tournament. With Uruguay now a two-time Olympic champion and due to celebrate its centenary of independence in 1930, FIFA named Uruguay as the host country.

The national associations of selected nations were invited to send a team, but the choice of Uruguay as a venue for the competition meant a long and costly trip across the Atlantic Ocean for the European sides at the time of the Great Depression. No European country pledged to send a team until two months before the start of the competition. Rimet eventually persuaded the national teams of Belgium, France, Romania, Hungary and Yugoslavia to make the trip and play the tournament. In total, 13 nations took part – seven from South America, four from Europe, and two from North America.

The first two World Cup matches took place simultaneously and were won by France and the United States, who beat Mexico 4–1 and Belgium 3–0, respectively. The first goal in World Cup history was scored by Lucien Laurent of France. Four days later, the first World Cup hat-trick was achieved by Bert Patenaude of the U.S. in the Americans' 3–0 win against Paraguay. In the final, Uruguay defeated Argentina 4–2 in front of a crowd of 93,000 people in Montevideo to become the first nation to win the World Cup.

The 1932 Summer Olympics held in Los Angeles did not include football as part of the programme. FIFA and the IOC also disagreed over the status of amateur players, and so football was dropped from the Games.

The 1934 World Cup was hosted by Italy and was the first World Cup to include a qualification stage. Sixteen teams qualified for the tournament, a number which would be retained until the expansion of the finals tournament in 1982. Uruguay, the titleholders from 1930, still upset about the poor European attendance at their World Cup in 1930, boycotted the 1934 World Cup, the only time the defending champions didn't take part in the next tournament. Bolivia and Paraguay were also absent, allowing Argentina and Brazil to progress to the finals in Italy without having to play any qualifying matches. Egypt became the first African team to compete, but lost to Hungary in the first round. Italy won the tournament, with a 2-1 extra time win over Czechoslovakia, becoming the first European team to do so.

The 1938 World Cup competition was also held in Europe (in France), much to the consternation of many South Americans, with Uruguay and Argentina boycotting. For the first time, the title holders and the host country were given automatic qualifications. Following a play-off match against Latvia, Austria qualified for the tournament, but because of the Anschluss, the annexation of Austria by Nazi Germany on 12 March 1938, Austria withdrew from the tournament, with some Austrian players being added to the German team, which was eliminated in the first round by Switzerland. Austria's place was offered to England, but they declined. This left the finals with 15 nations competing. France hosted, but for the first time the hosts did not win the competition, as Italy retained their title, beating Hungary 4-2 in the final. Polish striker Ernest Willimowski became the first player to score four goals in a World Cup game during Poland's 6–5 loss against Brazil; his record was later equalled by other players, but was not bettered until 56 years later in the 1994 World Cup.

== Hiatus due to World War II ==
1942 & 1946 FIFA World Cup bids
Country	Result
Germany	Cancelled
Brazil (resume)	Cancelled

The FIFA World Cup was planned to take place in 1942. Germany officially applied to host the 1942 FIFA World Cup at the 23rd FIFA Congress on 13 August 1936 in Berlin. In June 1939, Brazil also applied to host the tournament.

On 1 September 1939, Nazi Germany invaded Poland, triggering the outbreak of World War II. This fact, along with the United Kingdom and France declaring war on Nazi Germany, resulted in further plans for the 1942 FIFA World Cup to be cancelled, before a host country could be selected. During World War II, FIFA struggled to keep itself afloat, and had no financial or personnel resources to plan a peacetime tournament for when hostilities ended.

When the war ended in 1945, FIFA had no hope in planning and scheduling a 1946 World Cup in one year. FIFA's first meeting was on 1 July 1946 – around the time the 1946 FIFA World Cup would ordinarily have been played. When FIFA planned the next World Cup for 1949 no country would host the competition. The only major international tournament in 1946 was the 1946 South American Championship in which Argentina beat Brazil 2–0 on 10 February 1946. Eventually, the World Cup would resume in 1950, with Brazil (who was unaffected by the war despite joining the Allies and sending an expeditionary force to Italy to fight) hosting the tournament.

== Post-war years ==
=== 1950s ===
The competition resumed with the 1950 World Cup in Brazil, which was the first to include England. British teams withdrew from FIFA in 1920, partly out of unwillingness to play against the countries they had been at war with, and partly as a protest against foreign influence on football, but rejoined in 1946 following FIFA's invitation. England's involvement, however, was not to be a success. The English failed to make the final group round in a campaign that included a surprise 1–0 loss to the United States.

The tournament also saw the return of 1930 champions Uruguay, who had boycotted the previous two World Cups. For political reasons, Eastern European countries (such as Hungary, the Soviet Union and Czechoslovakia) did not enter. Title-holder Italy did take part, despite the Superga air disaster of 1949 in which the entire Grande Torino team (many of whom were national team players) were killed. The 1950 World Cup was the only tournament not to stage a final tie, replacing knockout rounds with two group phases. The last match of the second group phase, however, is sometimes referred to as a "final", as the group standings meant the winners would be the overall winners. Uruguay were surprise victors over hosts Brazil with a final score of 2–1 (the game would later be known as Maracanazo), and became champions for the second time. This game also held the record for the highest attendance at any sporting match, at roughly 200,000.

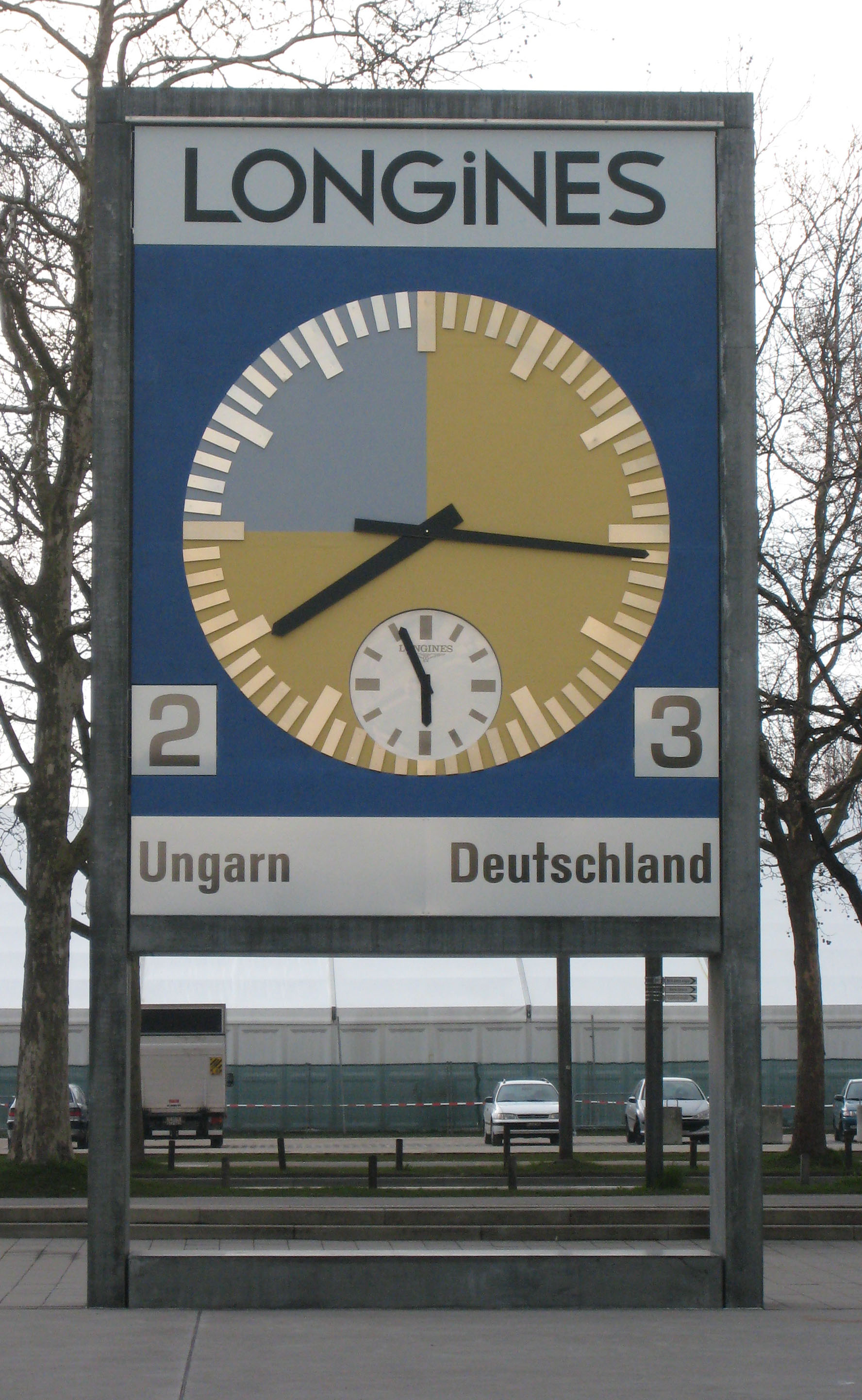
Clock installed in the Wankdorf Stadium in Bern in the final match of the 1954 FIFA World Cup

The 1954 World Cup was held in Switzerland during FIFA's 50th anniversary, and it was the first to be televised. The Soviet Union did not participate because of their dismal performance at the 1952 Summer Olympics. Scotland made their first appearance in the tournament, but were unable to register a win, going out after the group stage. This tournament set a number of all-time goal-scoring records, including highest average goals per game and highest-scoring team (Hungary), and most goals in a single match (Austria's 7–5 quarter-final victory over Switzerland). Despite losing 8-3 to Hungary in the group stage, West Germany won the tournament for the first time after defeating the defending Olympic champions 3–2 in the final, overturning a 2–0 deficit in the process, with Helmut Rahn scoring the winner. The match is known as the Miracle of Bern in Germany.

The 1958 World Cup was held in Sweden. The Soviet Union debuted in this tournament. During the qualification cycle, the USSR won gold medal at the 1956 Summer Olympics held in Melbourne. For the first (and so far only) time, all four British teams, England, Scotland, Wales, and Northern Ireland, qualified for the tournament. Wales was able to take advantage of a situation in the Africa/Asia zone, where the number of withdrawals would give Israel qualification without having played a single qualifying match. This prompted FIFA to rule that no team could qualify without playing a match, and so Israel were ordered to play against one of the teams finishing second in the other groups. A tie was created, and Wales defeated Israel 2–0 twice in 1958. It was the first, and so far the only time that a country played a World Cup after having been eliminated in the regular qualifiers. The tournament also saw the emergence of Pelé, who scored two goals in the final. French striker Just Fontaine was the top scorer of the tournament with 13 goals, a record that still stands despite expansion. Brazil won the tournament for the first time after beating hosts Sweden 5-2 in the final. Brazil became the first team to win a World Cup outside their home continent, a feat repeated by Brazil itself in 1970, 1994 and 2002, Argentina in 1986 and 2022, Spain in 2010 and 2026 and Germany in 2014.

=== 1960s ===
Chile hosted the 1962 World Cup. Two years before the tournament, an earthquake struck, the largest ever recorded at 9.5 magnitude, prompting officials to rebuild due to major damage to infrastructure. When the competition began, two of the best players were in poor form as Pelé was injured in Brazil's second group match against Czechoslovakia. Also, the Soviet Union saw their goalkeeper Lev Yashin show poor form including a 2–1 loss to hosts Chile as the hosts captured third place.

The competition was also marred by overly defensive and often violent tactics. This poisonous atmosphere culminated in what was known as the Battle of Santiago first round match between Italy and Chile in which Chile won 2–0. Prior to the match, two Italian journalists wrote unflattering articles about the host country. In the match, players on both sides made deliberate attempts to harm opponents though only two players from Italy were sent off by English referee Ken Aston. In the end, the Italian team needed police protection to leave the field in safety.

In a rematch of the group stage, Brazil beat Czechoslovakia in the final 3–1 led by Garrincha and Amarildo, in Pelé's absence, and retained the title. This was the second successful defense of a World Cup title, after Italy in 1938, and the most recent.

Colombia's Marcos Coll made World Cup history when he scored a goal direct from a corner kick (called an Olympic goal in Latin America), the only one ever made in a World Cup, past legendary Soviet goalkeeper Lev Yashin.

The 1966 World Cup, hosted by England, was the first to embrace marketing, featuring a mascot and official logo for the first time. The trophy was stolen in the run-up to the tournament but was found a week later by a dog named "Pickles". South Africa was banned due to the apartheid regime that governed the country at the time. The ban remained in effect until 1992 when the South Africa Football Association had their ban repealed by FIFA after the end of racial discrimination. The qualifying rounds of the tournament saw a controversy when the African nations decided to withdraw in protest of only one qualifying place allocated by FIFA to the regions of Asia, Oceania and Africa. The eventual qualifiers from the zone, North Korea, became the first Asian team to reach the quarter-finals, eliminating Italy in the group stages, before being eliminated by also debutants Portugal 5-3 in the quarter-finals. Defending champions Brazil were eliminated in the group stage. England won the tournament with a 4-2 win over West Germany in extra time. Geoff Hurst became the first player to score a hat-trick in a World Cup final. Eusébio from Portugal was the tournament top-scorer, with nine goals to his name.

João Havelange, the Brazilian FIFA president from 1974 to 1998, later claimed that the 1966 and 1974 World Cups were fixed so that England and Germany would win respectively.

=== 1970s ===
The 1970 World Cup was held in Mexico, the first time the tournament was held in North America, and the first time the tournament was held outside Europe or South America. The qualification stages of the tournament were marred by the Football War between Honduras and El Salvador. Israel had been a member of AFC, but due to a boycott by Arab countries, it was becoming harder to place them adequately in the qualifying rounds. They were grouped in Asia/Oceania. North Korea then refused to play Israel, even though this meant automatic disqualification for North Korea. Israel debuted in the 1970 tournament. Israel were eventually expelled from the AFC, and eventually admitted into UEFA.

The group stage clash between defending champions England and Brazil lived up to its billing, and is still remembered for England goalkeeper Gordon Banks' save from a Pelé header on the six-yard line. The tournament is also remembered for the semi-final match between Italy and West Germany, in which five goals were scored in extra time, and Franz Beckenbauer played with a broken arm, since Germany had used up all their allowed substitutions. Italy were the eventual 4–3 winners, but were defeated 1–4 in the final by Brazil, who became the first nation to win three World Cups, and were awarded the Jules Rimet trophy permanently for their achievement.

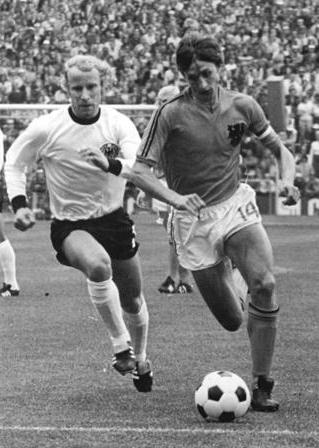
Johan Cruyff in action during the 1974 FIFA World Cup

A new trophy was created for the 1974 edition, held in West Germany. After a draw in their first UEFA/CONMEBOL Intercontinental play-off match against Chile in the qualifiers, the Soviet Union refused to travel to Santiago for the second fixture protesting the political situation in Chile, and in accordance with the regulations, Chile were awarded a victory. East Germany, Haiti, Australia and Zaire made their first finals. The tournament also saw a new format, where the two top teams from each of the earlier four groups were divided into two groups of four each again, the winner of either group playing each other in the final.

Poland finished third, after defeating defending champions Brazil 1–0 (and after defeating Argentina 3–2 and eliminating Italy 2–1 in the initial group play), having barely lost in terrible rain in the semi-finals to West Germany 0–1. The revolutionary Total Football system of the Dutch captured the footballing world's imagination, despite hosts West Germany winning the competition by beating the Netherlands 2–1 in the final.

The 1978 World Cup was held in Argentina, causing controversy as a military coup had taken place in the country two years earlier. Allegations that Dutch star Johan Cruyff refused to participate because of political convictions were refuted by him 30 years later. and none of the teams decided to stay away.

This was the hardest ever World Cup to qualify for. With 95 countries vying for 14 places (the holders and hosts qualified automatically), there were nearly seven teams competing for each place in Argentina. Hungary won their European group but still had to win a play-off against Bolivia to qualify, while England and Italy - the only former champions involved in European qualifying - were placed in the same group, with the result that England were eliminated on goal difference despite winning five of their six qualifying matches.

Iran and Tunisia were first-time participants. Tunisia won their first match against Mexico 3–1 and became the first African team to ever win a World Cup game. There was some on-field controversy as well. During the second round, Argentina had an advantage in their match against Peru since the kick off was several hours after Brazil's match with Poland. Brazil won their match 3–1, so Argentina knew that they had to beat Peru by four goals to advance to the final. Trailing 2–0 at half-time, Peru simply collapsed in the second half, and Argentina eventually won 6–0. Rumors suggested that Peru might have been bribed into allowing Argentina to win the match by such a large margin. Argentina went on to win the final 3–1 against the Netherlands in extra time, with the Dutch being runners-up for the second time in a row.

== Late 20th century ==
=== 1980s ===
The 1982 World Cup was held in Spain, and was the first held with 24 teams after an expansion. The teams were divided into six groups of four, with the top two teams in each group advancing to the second round, where they split into four groups of three. The winners of each group advanced to the semi-finals. Cameroon, Algeria, Honduras, New Zealand and Kuwait were the debutants. The group match between Kuwait and France was stage of a farcical incident. As the French were leading 3–1, the Kuwaiti team stopped playing after hearing a whistle from the stands which they thought had come from referee, as French defender Maxime Bossis scored. As the Kuwaiti team were protesting the goal, Sheikh Fahid Al-Ahmad Al-Sabah, president of the Kuwait Football Association, rushed onto the pitch and gave the referee a piece of his mind, who proceeded to disallow the goal. Bossis scored another valid goal a few minutes later and France won 4–1.

Also during the group stages, Hungary beat El Salvador with a 10–1 score, which has been the only occasion to this day that a team scored ten goals in a World Cup match, and the biggest victory in World Cup history. The group match between West Germany and Austria, which ended in a 1-0 win for West Germany, later resulted in a change of World Cup rules, after both teams visibly aimed to keep the scoreline ensuring both teams qualifying to the next round at the expense of Algeria. The semi-final between West Germany and France saw another controversy when German keeper Harald Schumacher's challenge took out Patrick Battiston, with the score at 1–1. Schumacher escaped a red card, and West Germany won in a penalty shoot-out, after coming back to level from having gone 1–3 down. The final was won by Italy 3-1 against West Germany, making Italian captain Dino Zoff the oldest player to win the World Cup at 40 years old. Italian striker Paolo Rossi, who was making his comeback after a match-fixing scandal and the ensuing ban, was the tournament top-scorer with six goals including a classic hat-trick against Brazil.

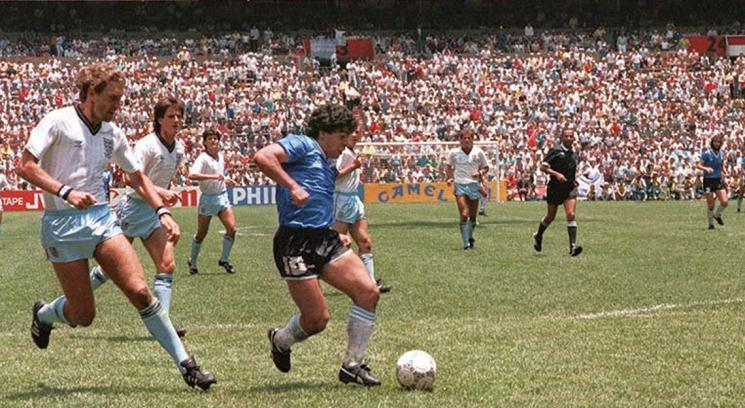
1986 FIFA World Cup: Argentine player Diego Maradona scoring against England

The 1986 World Cup was supposed to be hosted by Colombia. However, Colombia withdrew as the host to the tournament on 25 October 1982. Replacement hosts Mexico became the first nation to host two World Cup editions. The format changed again, with the second round being replaced by the round of 16 and the return of the quarter-finals. It was also decided that the final two matches in all groups would kick off simultaneously, to ensure complete fairness. Colombia then failed to even qualify. Canada, Denmark and Iraq debuted. José Batista of Uruguay set a World Cup record being sent off after a mere 56 seconds into the game against Scotland. The quarter-final match between England and Argentina is remembered for two remarkable Diego Maradona goals, later regarded as player of the tournament, the first, the controversial handball goal, and the second, considered to be the Goal of the Century, in which he dribbled half the length of the field past five English players before scoring. In the final, Argentina beat West Germany 3–2, inspired by Diego Maradona, who set up Jorge Burruchaga for the winner.

=== 1990s ===
The 1990 World Cup was held in Italy. Cameroon, participating in their second World Cup, made it to the quarter-finals after beating Argentina in the opening game. No African country had ever reached the quarter-finals before. Mexico was banned from the competition as a result of a two-year ban for age fraud at a youth championship, an incident known as Cachirules. The United States qualified for the first time since 1950 with a 1-0 away win at Trinidad and Tobago. An unpleasant episode marred the South American qualifiers: during the match between Brazil and Chile, a firework landed close to the Chilean goalkeeper Roberto Rojas, who then feigned injury by cutting his own face with a razor blade he had hidden in his glove. His team refused to continue the match (as they were down a goal at the time). The plot was discovered and resulted in a 12-year suspension for Rojas and to Chile being banned from the 1994 World Cup.

Costa Rica, the United Arab Emirates and the Republic of Ireland made their first appearances in the tournament, with the Republic of Ireland reaching the quarter-finals without winning a single game. The team drew all three group stage matches, defeated Romania in the round of 16 with a 5-4 win on penalties after a goalless draw, before being knocked out by hosts Italy 1-0 in the quarter-finals. This is the furthest a team has ever advanced in the World Cup without winning a game. The final was a rematch of the previous one. Unlike the previous final, West Germany beat Argentina 1–0 in the final to win their third title. That was the last tournament before German reunification.

The 1994 World Cup was held in the United States. Yugoslavia was excluded due to UN sanctions in connection to the Bosnian War. Colombia qualified after defeating Argentina 5-0. Japan almost qualified to the World Cup for the first time, but Japan drew with Iraq 2-2 in the final match of the qualification round, remembered by Japanese fans as the Agony of Doha. As a result, South Korea qualified to the tournament. Russia played the first World Cup competition after the fall of the Soviet Union in 1991. Greece, Nigeria and Saudi Arabia debuted in this tournament.

Oleg Salenko of Russia became the first player to score five goals in a single World Cup finals game in his country's 6–1 group stage win over Cameroon. In the same match, 42-year-old Roger Milla scored the only goal for Cameroon, becoming the oldest player ever to score in a World Cup match. Diego Maradona was banned mid-tournament after testing positive for cocaine. Without him, Argentina were eliminated in the last 16 by Romania 3-2. Hristo Stoichkov shared the Golden Boot as the joint top goal scorer in the tournament with Oleg Salenko (six goals), as well as earning the Bronze Ball award. He led Bulgaria to a shock 2–1 win over defending champions Germany in the quarter-finals, before losing 2–1 to Italy in the semi-finals and losing the match for third place to Sweden, 4–0. Brazil defeated Italy 3-2 on penalties after a goalless draw after extra time in the final. It was the first final to end 0-0, and the first to be decided by a penalty shoot-out.

The total attendance for the tournament of 3,587,538 remains the biggest in World Cup history. Despite soccer's relative lack of popularity in the host nation, the tournament was the most financially successful in World Cup history. It broke tournament records with an average attendance of 68,991 per match, marks that stood unbroken as of 2025 despite later expansion of the competition.

The 1998 World Cup was held in France, and had an expanded format featuring 32 teams. Japan debuted in this tournament after defeating Iran 3-2 in a playoff. But Iran also qualified for the tournament after defeating Australia in the intercontinental playoffs on away goals. In the second round match between France and Paraguay witnessed the first golden goal in World Cup history, as Laurent Blanc scored to give the hosts a 1–0 victory. Hosts France won the tournament by beating Brazil 3–0 in the final, with Brazilian star player Ronaldo controversially playing in the match after having had a seizure hours before kickoff. Debutants Croatia finished third.

== 21st century ==
=== 2000s ===
The 2002 World Cup was hosted jointly by South Korea and Japan, and it was the first to be held in Asia, and the first to have two hosts. Togolese Souleymane Mamam became the youngest player ever to take to a World Cup qualifiers game field at 13 years, 310 days in Lomé in May 2001. Australia defeated American Samoa 31–0 in a preliminary match – a new record for the margin of victory, and the highest-scoring match ever. However, both failed to qualify for this edition, with Australia being knocked out in the intercontinental playoffs by Uruguay.

The tournament was a successful one for teams traditionally regarded as minnows, with South Korea, Senegal and the United States all reaching the last eight. Turkish player Hakan Sukur made history by scoring the earliest World Cup goal of all time against South Korea at only 11 seconds in the match for third place. Turkey's third place was the best performance by a Muslim country in World Cup history, and South Korea had the best performance by an Asian team at World Cups. Brazil beat Germany 2–0 in the final for their fifth title.

The 2006 World Cup was held in Germany. It was the first World Cup for which the previous winner had to qualify; the host nation(s) continue to receive an automatic berth. First seed and holders Brazil and second seeded England were initially English bookmakers' favourites. Four African teams also made their debut in the World Cup: Togo, Ivory Coast, Angola and Ghana, who made it to last 16 by beating the Czech Republic, third ranked in the world, 2–1, along with the United States 2–0, before losing to the defending champions Brazil 0–3. Defending champions Brazil were eliminated by France with a 1-0 in the quarter-finals.

A strong performance by Germany brought them as far as the semi-finals, being defeated in the semi-finals by Italy with a 2-0 score after extra time. Germany won third place against Portugal 3-1. The final was between Italy and France, in which French captain Zinedine Zidane was sent off in the last ten minutes of extra time for a headbutt to the chest of Italian central defender Marco Materazzi. Italy went on to win 5–3 in a penalty shoot-out, the score having been 1–1 after 90 minutes and extra time.

=== 2010s ===
The 2010 World Cup was held in South Africa. It was the first cup hosted in Africa, and the cup was won by Spain. The tournament was noted for its highly defensive opening matches, controversies surrounding goal-line technology, and the introduction of vuvuzelas. Though considered as one of the tournament favorites, the Spaniards won the cup despite scoring only eight goals in seven games and losing their opening match to Switzerland. David Villa led the squad in scoring with five goals. In a final which saw a record number of yellow cards distributed and what some considered violent play from the Dutch side, the ten-man Netherlands squad were defeated 1–0 in the 116th minute of extra time by an Andrés Iniesta goal.

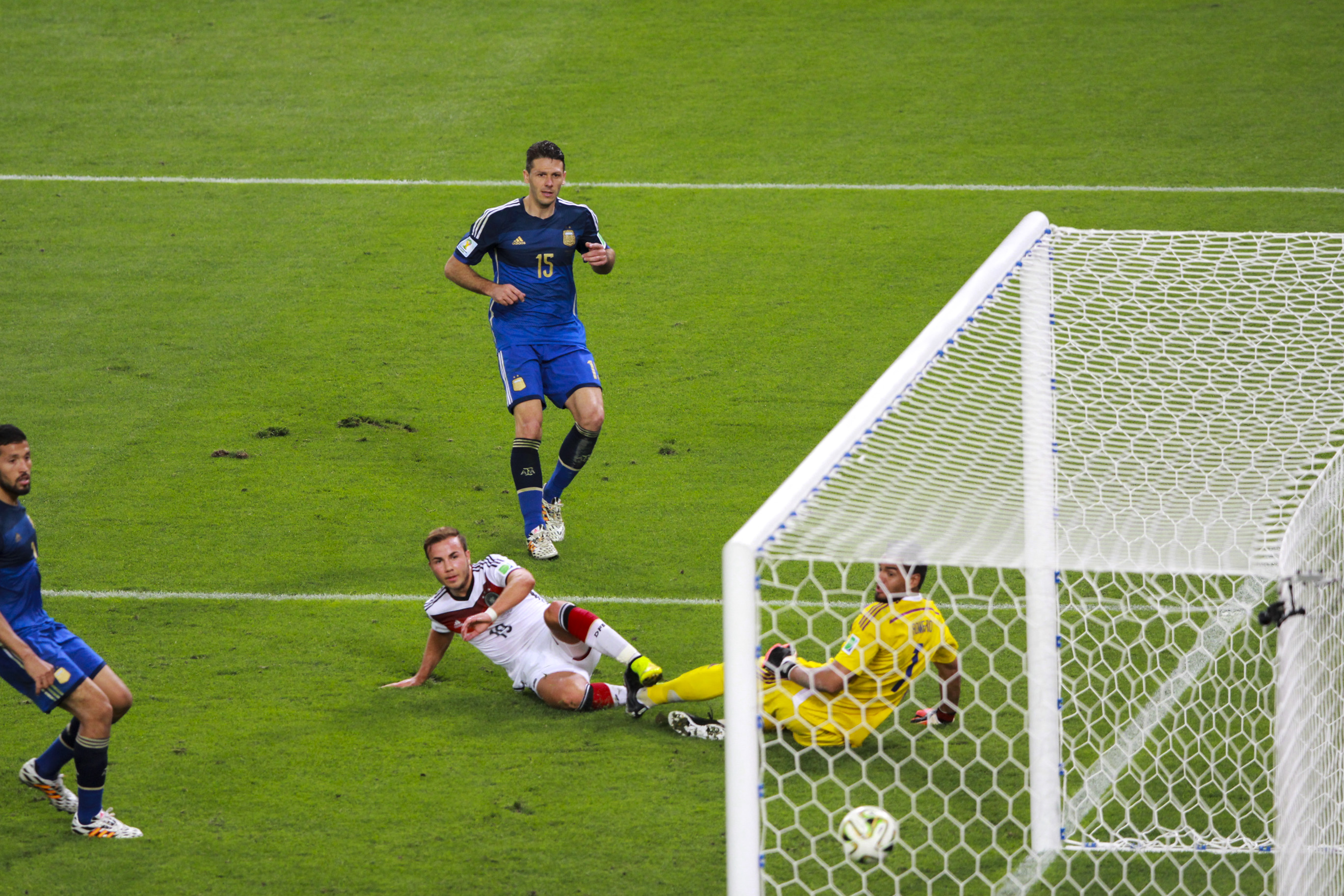
Mario Götze scoring the match winning goal that gave Germany its fourth World Cup title.

The 2014 World Cup was held in Brazil, marking the second time that Brazil hosted the competition. The cup was won by Germany, who beat Argentina 1–0 in the final. The Netherlands defeated Brazil (who lost to the eventual winners, Germany, 7–1 in the semi-finals) 3–0 in the match for third place.

Because of the relatively high ambient temperatures in Brazil, particularly at the northern venues, cooling breaks for the players were first introduced during these games. In this World Cup there was the debut of sensors to avoid phantom goals with the Goal-line technology, used to determine, in doubtful situations, whether the ball crossed the goal line.

The 2018 World Cup was held in Russia. It was the first cup to be held in Eastern Europe. The cup was won by France, who beat Croatia 4–2 in the final. Belgium defeated England 2–0 in the match for third place. It was also the first cup to use the video assistant referee (VAR) system.

=== 2020s ===
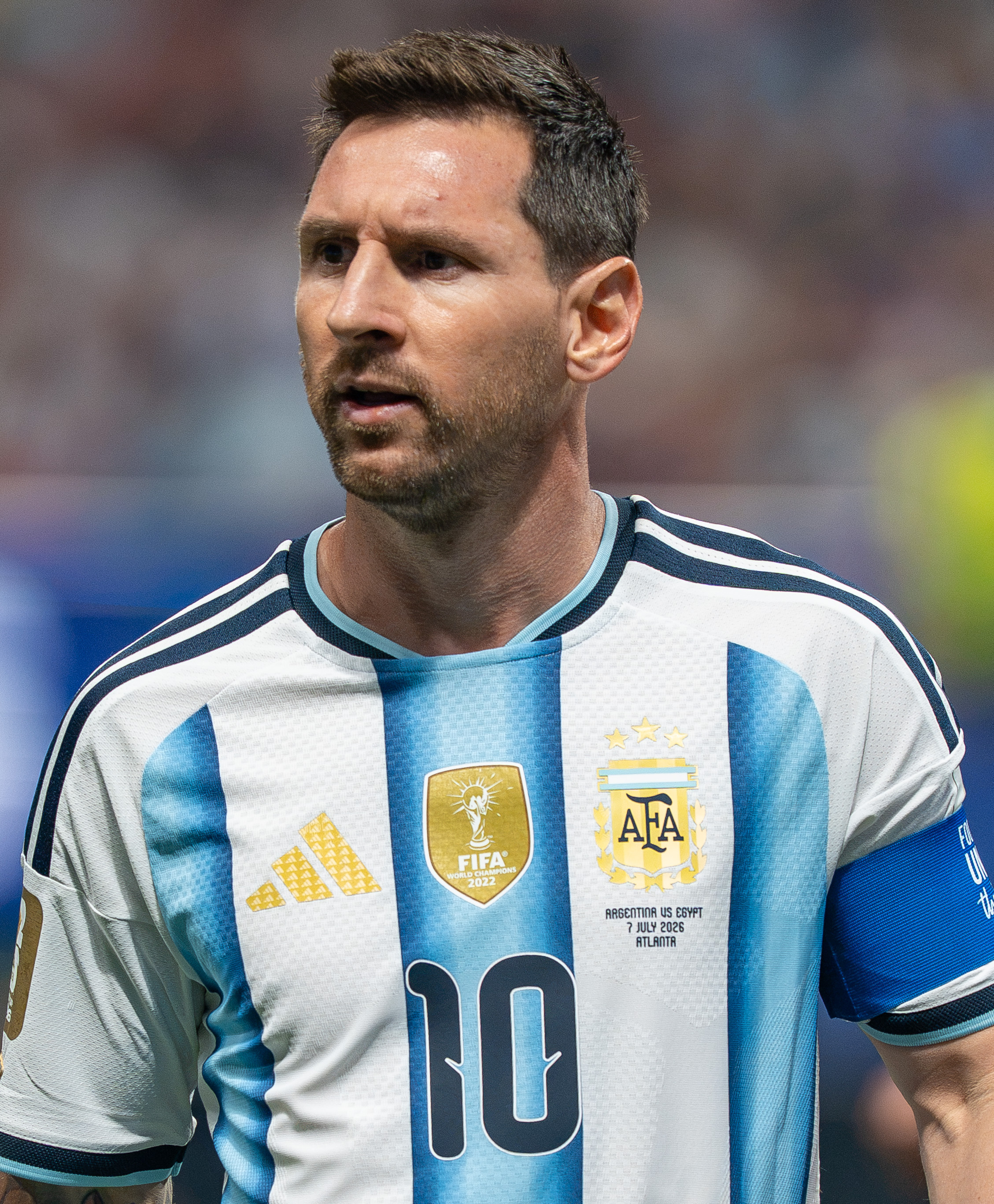
Lionel Messi, captain of Argentina, the only player to win the Ballon d'Or at a World Cup twice.

The 2022 World Cup was hosted by Qatar, and was the first tournament to not be held in the northern hemisphere summer time in which it is usually held, and it was also the first to be held in the Middle East. The cup was won by Argentina, who prevailed over defending champions France 4–2 in the penalty shoot-out, after the final was drawn 3–3 after extra time, despite France's Kylian Mbappé netting a hat-trick, becoming only the second player to do so in a World Cup Final. Previous tournament runners-up Croatia won the match for third place, beating Morocco 2–1, whose fourth-place finish was the furthest of any African or Arab nation at the World Cup. It was also the last to feature 32 teams.

The 2026 World Cup was co-hosted by the United States, Canada and Mexico, all in North America, making it the first to be hosted by three nations. It is also the first tournament to feature 48 teams. The cup was won by Spain, who prevailed over defending champions Argentina 1–0.

=== 2030s ===
The hosts for the 2030 World Cup will be Argentina, Uruguay, and Paraguay in South America for the opening matches to honor the centennial of the first FIFA World Cup, as well as Morocco in Africa, and Spain and Portugal in Europe.

The 2034 World Cup will be hosted by Saudi Arabia.

== Evolution of the format ==
The number of teams and the format of each final tournament have varied considerably over the years. In most tournaments, the tournament consists of a round-robin group stage followed by a single-elimination knockout stage.

Year	Teams	Matches		Format
Year	Teams	Min.	Act.	Format
1930	13	18		4 groups of 3–4, semi-finals, final
1934	16	16	17	round of 16, quarter-finals, semi-finals, match for third place, final
1938	15	15	18	round of 16, (Note: One team received bye to the quarter-finals.) quarter-finals, semi-finals, match for third place, final
1950	13	22		4 groups of 2–4, final round-robin group of 4
1954	16	24	26	4 groups of 4, (Note: Each group had two seeded and two unseeded teams, and only matches were played that featured a seeded and an unseeded team.) quarter-finals, semi-finals, match for third place, final
1958	16	32	35	4 groups of 4, quarter-finals, semi-finals, match for third place, final
1962	16	32		4 groups of 4, quarter-finals, semi-finals, match for third place, final
1966	16	32		4 groups of 4, quarter-finals, semi-finals, match for third place, final
1970	16	32		4 groups of 4, quarter-finals, semi-finals, match for third place, final
1974	16	38		4 groups of 4 (first round), 2 groups of 4 (second round), match for third place, final
1978	16	38		4 groups of 4 (first round), 2 groups of 4 (second round), match for third place, final
1982	24	52		6 groups of 4 (first round), 4 groups of 3 (second round), semi-finals, match for third place, final
1986	24	52		6 groups of 4, round of 16, quarter-finals, semi-finals, match for third place, final
1990	24	52		6 groups of 4, round of 16, quarter-finals, semi-finals, match for third place, final
1994	24	52		6 groups of 4, round of 16, quarter-finals, semi-finals, match for third place, final
1998	32	64		8 groups of 4, round of 16, quarter-finals, semi-finals, match for third place, final
2002	32	64		8 groups of 4, round of 16, quarter-finals, semi-finals, match for third place, final
2006	32	64		8 groups of 4, round of 16, quarter-finals, semi-finals, match for third place, final
2010	32	64		8 groups of 4, round of 16, quarter-finals, semi-finals, match for third place, final
2014	32	64		8 groups of 4, round of 16, quarter-finals, semi-finals, match for third place, final
2018	32	64		8 groups of 4, round of 16, quarter-finals, semi-finals, match for third place, final
2022	32	64		8 groups of 4, round of 16, quarter-finals, semi-finals, match for third place, final
2026	48	104		12 groups of 4, round of 32, round of 16, quarter-finals, semi-finals, match for third place, final
2030	48	104	?	12 groups of 4, round of 32, round of 16, quarter-finals, semi-finals, match for third place, final
2034	48	104	?	12 groups of 4, round of 32, round of 16, quarter-finals, semi-finals, match for third place, final

Notes

In 1934 and 1938 draws in knockout matches were resolved via a replay. Later, drawing of lots was provided for, though never invoked. Since 1974, penalty shoot-outs are used.

In 1954 each group had two seeded and two unseeded teams; the seeded teams played only unseeded teams and vice versa.

Up to 1958, ranking ties in groups were to be broken via a playoff; this only happened in 1954 and 1958.

Until the 1990 FIFA World Cup, 2 points were conceded for a win and 1 point was conceded for a draw. Since the 1994 FIFA World Cup, 3 points are conceded for a win and 1 point is conceded for a draw.

Each group of four teams plays a round-robin schedule. As of the 1986 World Cup, all final group games must be held simultaneously, a rule instituted by FIFA to minimize collusion amongst teams requiring a certain result to advance. FIFA instituted a policy to award three points for a win in the 1994 World Cup. Although goals for was already a tiebreaker, FIFA hoped to create an additional incentive for teams to pursue victory. The first team affected by the rule was Paraguay in 1998, which would have won its group on goal differential over Nigeria under prior FIFA rules. Paraguay advanced to the knockout phase as group runner-up and was defeated by host nation and eventual champion France in the round of 16. It is not possible under the new point system to be eliminated from the group stage with a second place or higher winning percentage, however it is possible to finish behind a team with the same winning percentage yet a lower goal difference. This took place in the 2010 World Cup when New Zealand finished with three draws and Slovakia finished with one win, one draw, and one loss. Slovakia advanced in Group F by finishing second with four points, eliminating New Zealand with three points. Under the previous FIFA point allotment system, New Zealand would have advanced with a zero goal difference, while Slovakia would have been eliminated with a goal difference of −1.

The criteria for advancement to knockout phase is as follows:

1. Greatest number of points in group matches
2. Greatest total goal difference in the three group matches
3. Greatest number of goals scored in the three group matches
4. If teams remained level after those criteria, a mini-group would be formed from those teams, who would be ranked on:
  1. Most points earned in matches against other teams in the tie
  2. Greatest goal difference in matches against other teams in the tie
  3. Greatest number of goals scored in matches against other teams in the tie
5. If teams remained level after all these criteria, FIFA would hold a drawing of lots
6. The drawing of lots for tied teams takes place one hour after the final game in the group at the stadium where the championship match is held. The drawing of lots is similar to the World Cup draw in terms of style and format; a ball is drawn from a pot, which contains balls with the names of each tied team.

As of the 2022 World Cup, lots have only been drawn once in tournament history. However, they were used to separate second and third place in a group (Republic of Ireland and the Netherlands in 1990) where both were already assured of qualification. Thus, a team has never been eliminated based upon drawn lots.

== World Cup–winning teams, captains, and managers ==
Year	Host	Winning team	Captain	Head coach
1930	Uruguay	Uruguay	José Nasazzi	Alberto Suppici
1934	Italy	Italy	Giampiero Combi	Vittorio Pozzo
1938	France	Italy	Giuseppe Meazza	Vittorio Pozzo
1950	Brazil	Uruguay	Obdulio Varela	Juan López Fontana
1954	Switzerland	West Germany	Fritz Walter	Sepp Herberger
1958	Sweden	Brazil	Hilderaldo Bellini	Vicente Feola
1962	Chile	Brazil	Mauro Ramos	Aymoré Moreira
1966	England	England	Bobby Moore	Alf Ramsey
1970	Mexico	Brazil	Carlos Alberto Torres	Mário Zagallo
1974	West Germany	West Germany	Franz Beckenbauer	Helmut Schön
1978	Argentina	Argentina	Daniel Passarella	César Luis Menotti
1982	Spain	Italy	Dino Zoff	Enzo Bearzot
1986	Mexico	Argentina	Diego Maradona	Carlos Bilardo
1990	Italy	West Germany	Lothar Matthäus	Franz Beckenbauer
1994	United States	Brazil	Dunga	Carlos Alberto Parreira
1998	France	France	Didier Deschamps	Aimé Jacquet
2002	South Korea; Japan	Brazil	Cafu	Luiz Felipe Scolari
2006	Germany	Italy	Fabio Cannavaro	Marcello Lippi
2010	South Africa	Spain	Iker Casillas	Vicente del Bosque
2014	Brazil	Germany	Philipp Lahm	Joachim Löw
2018	Russia	France	Hugo Lloris	Didier Deschamps
2022	Qatar	Argentina	Lionel Messi	Lionel Scaloni
2026	Canada; Mexico; United States	Spain	Rodri	Luis de la Fuente

== See also ==
- History of FIFA
- List of FIFA World Cup hosts
