= Campilongo =

Campilongo is an Italian surname. Notable people with the surname include:

- Antonio Campilongo (1911–?), Argentine footballer
- Jim Campilongo (born 1958), American jazz musician
- Martín Campilongo (born 1969), Argentine actor
- Salvatore Campilongo (born 1961), Italian footballer and manager
