= Moisés Avilés =

Chilean footballer (1909–1972)

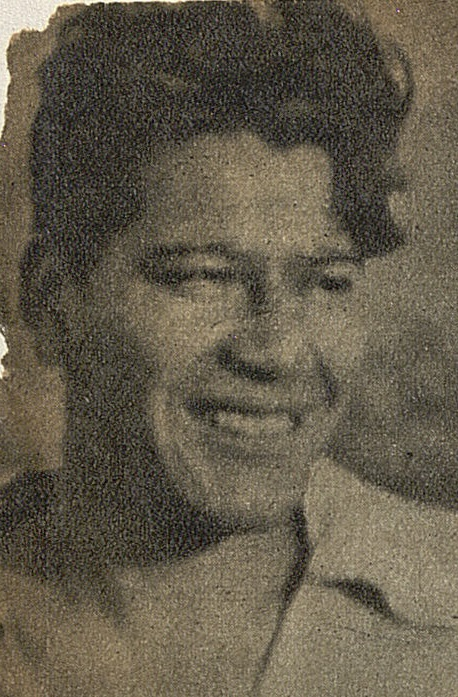

Personal information
- Full name: Moisés Elías Avilés Obregón
- Date of birth: 12 February 1909
- Date of death: 19 April 1972 (aged 63)
- Position: Forward

International career
Years	Team	Apps	(Gls)
1935–1937	Chile	4	(0)

Moisés Avilés (12 February 1909 – 19 April 1972) was a Chilean footballer. He played in four matches for the Chile national football team from 1935 to 1937. He was also part of Chile's squad for the 1935 South American Championship.
