= Héctor Macchiavello =

Uruguayan footballer

Hector Macchiavello
Personal information
- Date of birth: 21 September 1903
- Place of birth: Montevideo, Uruguay
- Date of death: Unknown
- Position: Goalkeeper

Senior career*
Years	Team	Apps	(Gls)
- Racing Montevideo
- Audax Italiano

International career
1932–1935	Uruguay	2	(0)
Medal record
Men's football
Representing Uruguay
South American Championship
Winner	1935 Peru
- * Club domestic league appearances and goals

Héctor Macchiavello (21 September 1903 – date of death unknown) was a Uruguayan footballer who played as a goalkeeper. He was part of Uruguay national team which won 1935 South American Championship.

== Career statistics ==
=== International ===
National team	Year	Apps	Goals
Uruguay	1932	1	0
Uruguay	1933	0	0
Uruguay	1934	0	0
Uruguay	1935	1	0
Total		2	0

== Honours ==
Uruguay

- Copa América: 1935
