= Eduardo Schneeberger =

Chilean footballer (1911-1992)

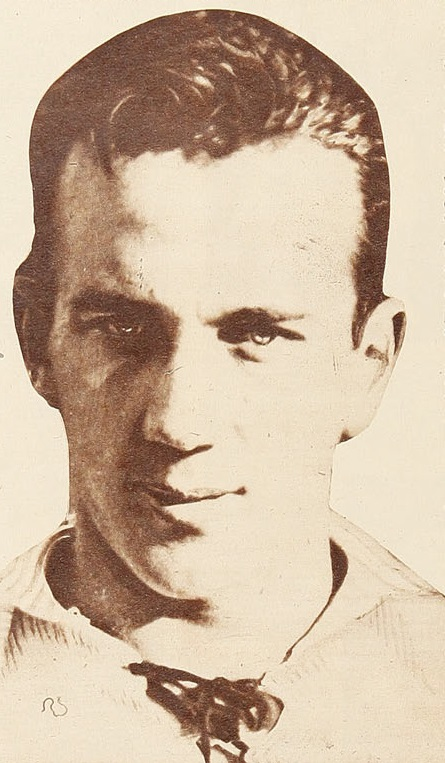

Personal information
- Full name: Eduardo Schneeberger Schöfer
- Date of birth: 27 January 1911
- Place of birth: Santiago, Chile
- Date of death: 27 December 1992 (aged 81)

Senior career*
Years	Team	Apps	(Gls)
- Colo-Colo

International career
1935–1937	Chile	3	(0)
- * Club domestic league appearances and goals

Eduardo Schneeberger Schöfer (27 January 1911 – 27 December 1992) was a Chilean footballer. He played in three matches for the Chile national football team from 1935 to 1937. He was also part of Chile's squad for the 1935 South American Championship.
