= Isaías Azerman =

Chilean footballer (1912-1983)

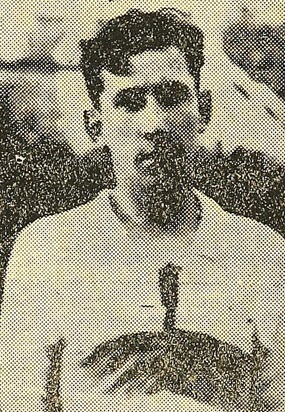

Personal information
- Date of birth: 21 July 1912
- Place of birth: Santiago, Chile
- Date of death: 13 November 1983 (aged 71)
- Height: 1.75 m (5 ft 9 in)
- Position: Goalkeeper

Senior career*
Years	Team	Apps	(Gls)
- Audax Italiano

International career
1935	Chile	1	(0)
- * Club domestic league appearances and goals

Isaías Azerman (21 July 1912 – 13 November 1983) was a Chilean footballer who played as a goalkeeper. He appeared in one match for the Chile national football team in 1935. He was also part of Chile's squad for the 1935 South American Championship.

At the club level Azerman played for Audax Italiano, joining them on their 1933 barnstorming tour of South, Central and North America.

Azerman was of Jewish descent.
