= Agenor Muñiz =

Uruguayan footballer (1910-1962)

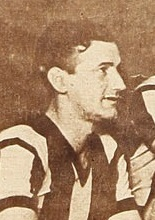

Personal information
- Date of birth: 2 February 1910
- Place of birth: Montevideo, Uruguay
- Date of death: 28 January 1962 (aged 51)

Senior career*
Years	Team	Apps	(Gls)
- Montevideo Wanderers
- Peñarol

International career
1933–1943	Uruguay	30	(1)
Medal record
Men's football
Representing Uruguay
South American Championship
Winner	1935 Peru
Winner	1942 Uruguay
Third place	1937 Argentina
- * Club domestic league appearances and goals

Agenor Muñiz (2 February 1910 – 28 January 1962) was a Uruguayan footballer.

== Playing career ==
=== Club career ===
Muñiz played for Montevideo Wanderers and Peñarol in the Uruguayan national league. He made over 200 appearances for Montevideo Wanderers.

=== International career ===
Muñiz made his international debut for Uruguay national football team in December 1933. In the course of his career he played in two South American Championship winning teams. He played his last match for La Celeste in April 1943.
