= César Luis Menotti =

Argentine footballer and manager (1938–2024)

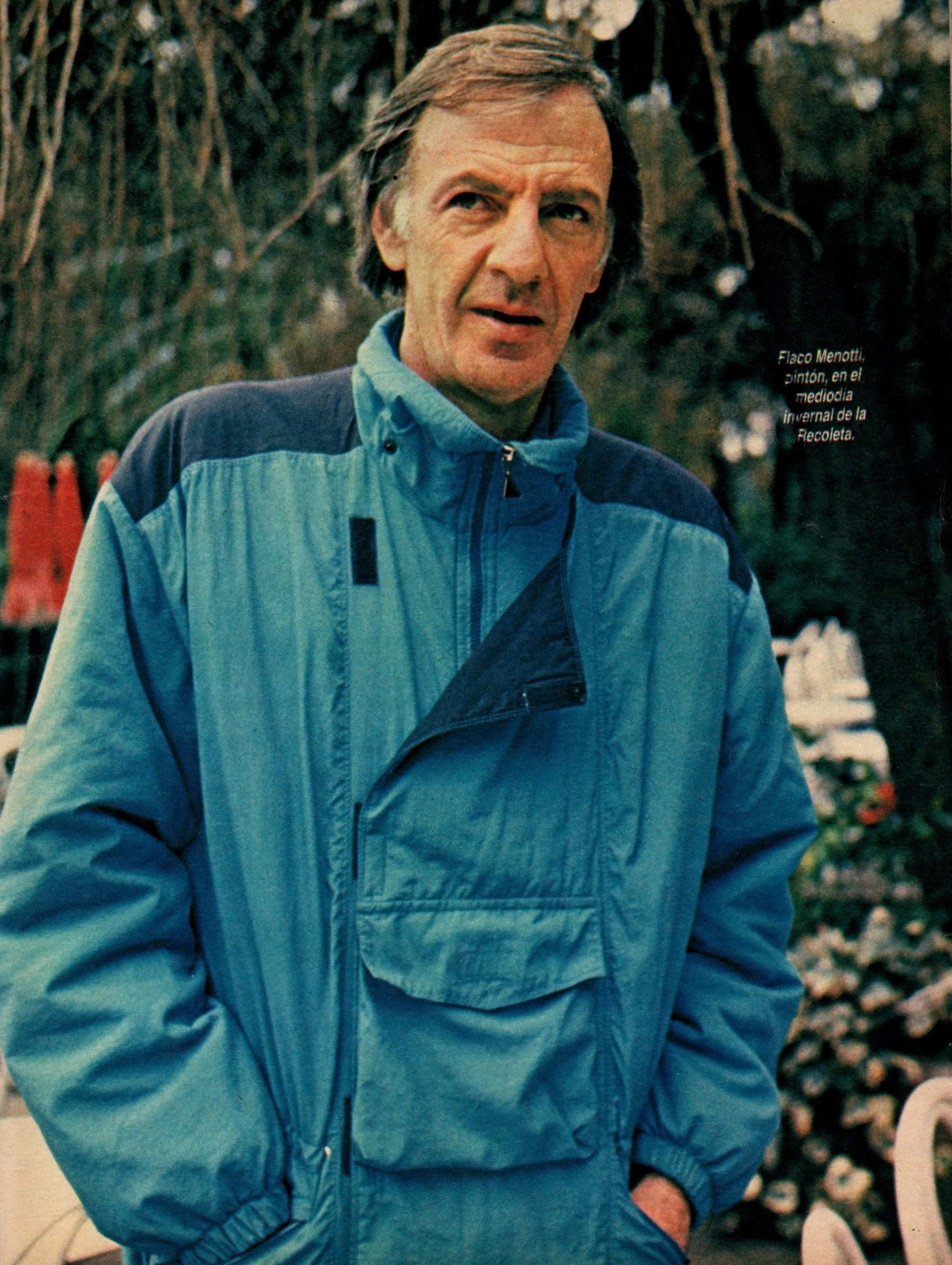
- Menotti in 1987

Personal information
- Date of birth: 22 October 1938
- Place of birth: Rosario, Argentina
- Date of death: 5 May 2024 (aged 85)
- Place of death: Buenos Aires, Argentina
- Height: 1.93 m (6 ft 4 in)
- Position: Striker

Senior career*
Years	Team	Apps	(Gls)
1960–1963	Rosario Central	86	(47)
1964	Racing Club		
1965–1966	Boca Juniors	18	(6)
1967–1968	New York Generals	29	(9)
1968	Santos	0	
1969–1970	Juventus-SP	8	(2)

International career
1963–1968	Argentina	11	(2)

Managerial career
- 1970: Newell's Old Boys
- 1971–1974: Huracán
- 1974–1983: Argentina
- 1978–1979: Argentina U20
- 1983–1984: Barcelona
- 1986–1987: Boca Juniors
- 1987–1988: Atlético Madrid
- 1989: River Plate
- 1990–1991: Peñarol
- 1991–1992: Mexico
- 1993–1994: Boca Juniors
- 1996–1997: Independiente
- 1997: Sampdoria
- 1997–1999: Independiente
- 2002: Rosario Central
- 2005: Independiente
- 2006: Puebla
- 2007: Tecos
- 2019–2023: Argentina (director)
Medal record
Men's football
Representing Argentina (as manager)
FIFA World Cup
Gold medal – first place	1978 Argentina
FIFA U-20 World Cup
Gold medal – first place	1979 Japan
- * Club domestic league appearances and goals

César Luis Menotti (Spanish pronunciation: [ˈsesaɾ ˈlwis meˈnoti]; 22 October 1938 – 5 May 2024), known as El Flaco ("Slim"), was an Argentine football player and manager who won the 1978 FIFA World Cup as the head coach of the Argentina national team.

Menotti played as a striker, most notably for Argentine clubs Rosario Central and Boca Juniors. As a manager, he won three cups with Barcelona and also led Atlético Madrid in La Liga in the 1980s, as well as leading Superclásico rivals Boca Juniors and River Plate. He was briefly the manager of Mexico and Italian Serie A club Sampdoria in the 1990s.

During Menotti's tenure as manager of the Argentina national team (from 1974 to 1982), he carried out a project that differed from previous processes, bringing him to be recognised as one of the most influential managers in the history of Argentine football.

== Playing career ==
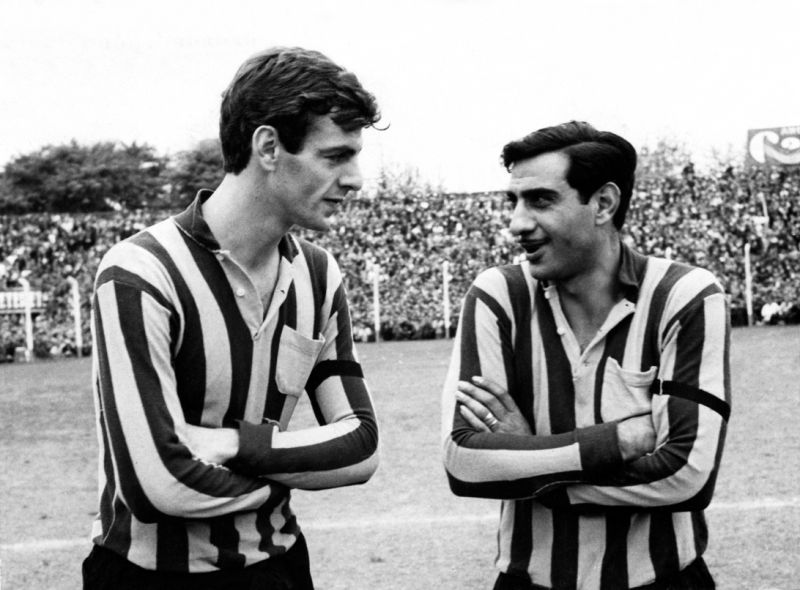
Menotti (left) with Miguel "Gitano" Juárez in Rosario Central. They would then work together in Newell's Old Boys

After playing some games for the reserve team, Menotti debuted in Primera División playing for Rosario Central in 1960. His first professional match was on 3 July versus Boca Juniors, a 3–1 victory.

On 27 November 1963, Menotti played a friendly for River Plate against Juventus. He scored in the 2–1 loss in Italy. The following June, he scored in another exhibition defeat, 2–1 away to Nacional in Montevideo, and was then approached by the host team.

Menotti remained four seasons in Rosario Central prior to be transferred in 1964 to Racing, then moving to Boca Juniors in 1965, where he would win his first title as player, the 1965 Primera División. Two years later Menotti arrived to the North American Soccer League to play for the New York Generals. In 1968 Menotti was traded to Santos where he was teammate of Pelé and won the Torneio Roberto Gomes Pedrosa, a tournament later recognized as national championship of Brazil, of that year. Menotti signed with Clube Atlético Juventus, where he retired from football in 1970 after playing games and scoring twice.

== Managerial career ==
=== Early career ===
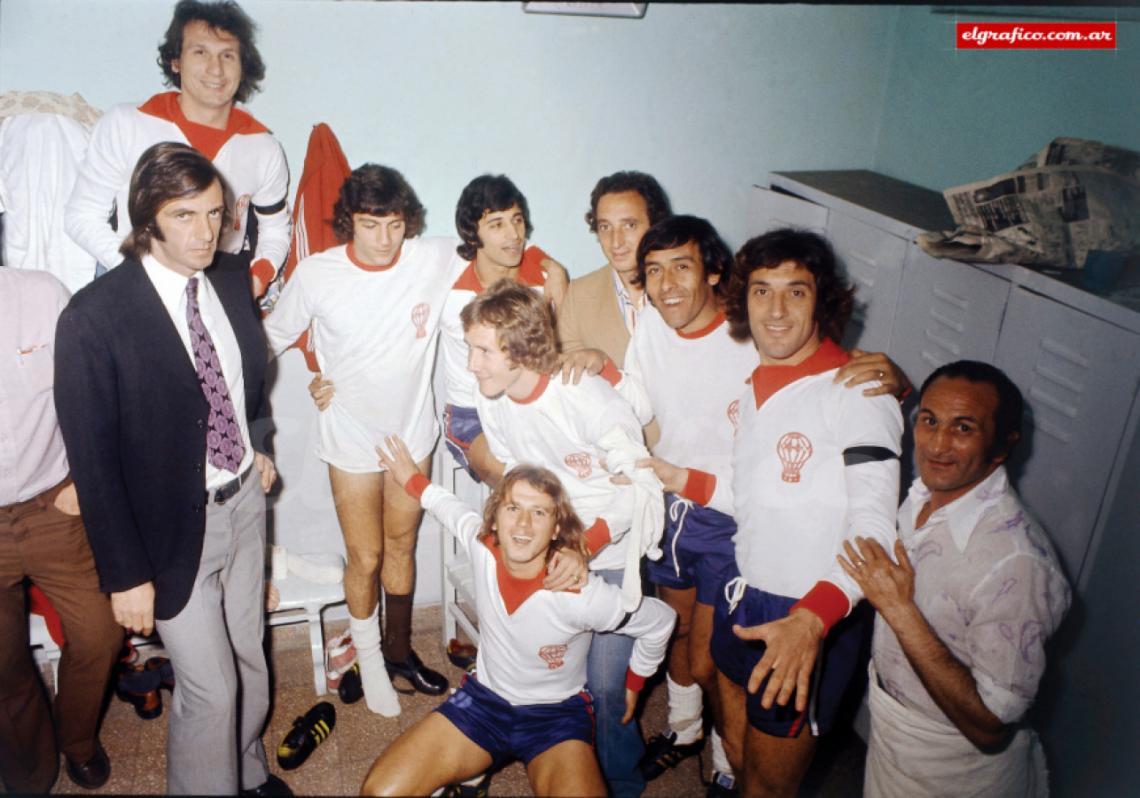
Menotti and players of Huracán celebrating the 1973 Primera División championship

After retiring from play, Menotti became friends with coach Miguel "Gitano" Juárez, with whom he traveled to the 1970 FIFA World Cup in Mexico. Fascinated by the Brazilian style of play led by his friend Pelé, he decided to become a coach himself. Menotti worked as coach assistant of Juárez in Newell's Old Boys.

As manager, Menotti won his first title with Huracán, the 1973 Torneo Metropolitano with a side that included notable players such as Carlos Babington, Miguel Brindisi, Roque Avallay and the outstanding René Houseman. That squad was widely praised by the media due to their style of playing, being considered one of the best Argentine teams of all time. Huracán played 32 matches, winning 19 with 5 losses. The squad scored 62 goals and conceded 30.

=== Argentina national team ===
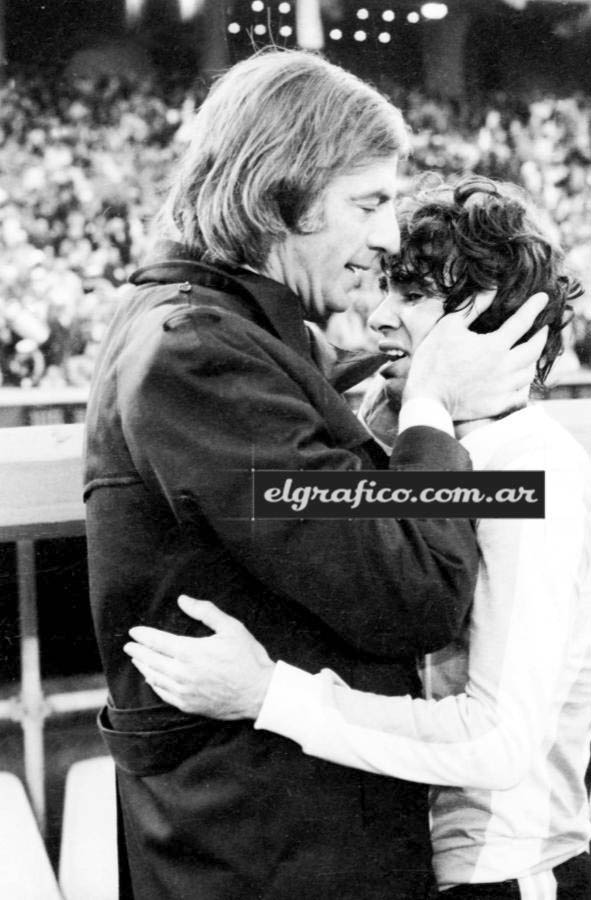
Menotti and Jorge Olguín when Argentina won the FIFA World Cup in 1978

Menotti was appointed the head coach of the Argentina national team in October 1974. He led them to their first FIFA World Cup in 1978, defeating the Netherlands in the final. He had faced considerable criticism before the tournament when he excluded 17-year-old Diego Maradona from the squad, believing him to be too young to cope with the pressure.

After the World Cup triumph, Menotti demanded for a large raise from the Argentine Football Association, which complicated his contract negotiations. The Uruguayan Football Association offered him US$1.1 million to lead their national team for four years, but were unsuccessful in their approach.

In 1979, Menotti led the Argentina U20 national team to success in the World Youth Championship in Japan, with Maradona the team's star player. At the 1982 World Cup, Menotti chose Maradona, who made his World Cup debut at age 21. He was unable to advance past the second round.

=== 1980s ===
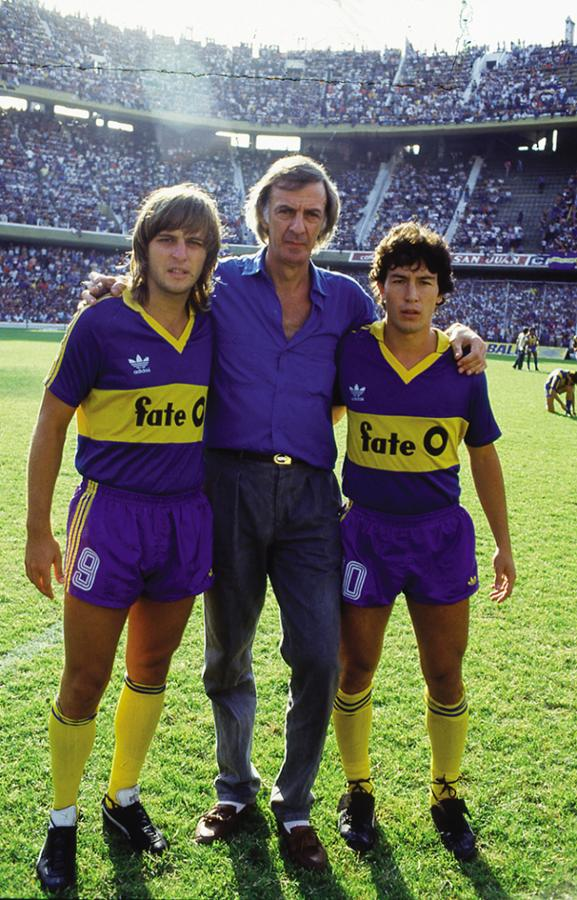
Menotti, Jorge Rinaldi and Carlos Daniel Tapia at Boca Juniors in 1987

In March 1983, Barcelona sacked Udo Lattek and brought in Menotti, who reunited with Maradona. In the final three months of the season, he led them to the Copa del Rey and the Copa de la Liga, both against El Clásico rivals Real Madrid. In the following season, he won only the 1983 Supercopa de España and his final game was the 1–0 loss to Athletic Bilbao in the 1984 Copa del Rey final, after which he left and Maradona was sold to Napoli.

After a brief spell back home with Boca Juniors, Menotti returned to Spain in July 1987 to manage Atlético Madrid, who had gone a decade without a league title. He won 4–0 away at Real Madrid in the Madrid derby on 7 November. After 23 games of the season, Atlético were second to Real Madrid, but went on a six-game winless run culminating in a 3–1 home loss to their city rivals on 20 March 1988. Chairman Jesús Gil had already had talks with Menotti – including about the players' nightlife before their draw away to Real Sociedad in October – and subsequently dismissed him.

Menotti returned to Buenos Aires in July 1988, taking over at Boca's Superclásico rivals River Plate. He brought in players such as Jorge Higuaín, but was unable to make Paraguayan goalkeeper José Luis Chilavert a permanent signing after two weeks training at the club. The Millonarios finished fourth in the 1988–89.

=== 1990s ===
In July 1990, Menotti was hired at Peñarol, a Uruguayan club going through restructuring after selling most of their team that had won the Copa Libertadores in 1987. After showing good form on a pre-season tour of Europe, the club finished third in the Uruguayan Primera División and missed out on Libertadores qualification. In the Supercopa Libertadores, an event for teams that had previously won the continental tournament, they eliminated Santos and Boca before a 7–2 aggregate loss in the semi-finals to Paraguay's Olimpia; his team had three players sent off in the 6–0 second-leg defeat in Asunción.

In 1991, Menotti returned to international football when he was appointed by Mexico, who were recovering from the Cachirules scandal that had seen them banned from the 1990 FIFA World Cup. He oversaw the opening qualifiers for the 1994 FIFA World Cup but resigned in 1992 in solidarity with two associates who had left the Mexican Football Federation.

Menotti had a third spell in Europe when he led Sampdoria of the Italian Serie A briefly in 1997. His squad included the likes of Siniša Mihajlović, Vincenzo Montella, Jürgen Klinsmann and Alain Boghossian. He oversaw elimination from the UEFA Cup by Athletic Bilbao, and took 11 points from 8 games before being replaced by returning championship-winning coach Vujadin Boškov.

Before and after his short stint in Italy, Menotti was manager of Independiente. His team came runners-up in the 1996–97 Argentine Primera División.

=== Later career ===
In March 2002, Menotti was hired at Rosario Central, his hometown club where he had begun playing and had always supported. On 1 September that year, he oversaw their first win away to city rivals Newell's Old Boys in 22 years, but that was followed by nine games without a win and his dismissal. He refused to leave and accused the board of cowardice, as he had learned of the decision from the newspapers.

Menotti returned to Independiente for 2005, amidst financial problems at the club. He resigned on 19 April, and criticised the club's establishment.

Through his friendship with Emilio Maurer – one of the executives he resigned from the Mexico national team in solidarity with – Menotti was hired by Puebla. He was due to be the coach, but could not fit this responsibility around a commitment to be an analyst for TV Azteca at the 2006 FIFA World Cup. He instead worked as an advisor at the club and his coaching staff prepared Puebla in Argentina for a promotion play-off, lost 5–1 on aggregate to Querétaro.

In late August 2007, Menotti was hired by another Mexican team, Tecos of the Liga MX. He took offence when Pumas UNAM hosted his team on a pitch that had just been used for American football, likening it to having a woman selling tacos in the crowd while Luciano Pavarotti sang at the opera. He resigned in January 2008, between the Apertura and Clausura tournaments, after a dispute with the board.

On 3 February 2017, Guadalajara made a formal offer to sign him on as their academy director. In January 2019, Menotti was named as the director of the Argentina national teams.

== Personal life ==
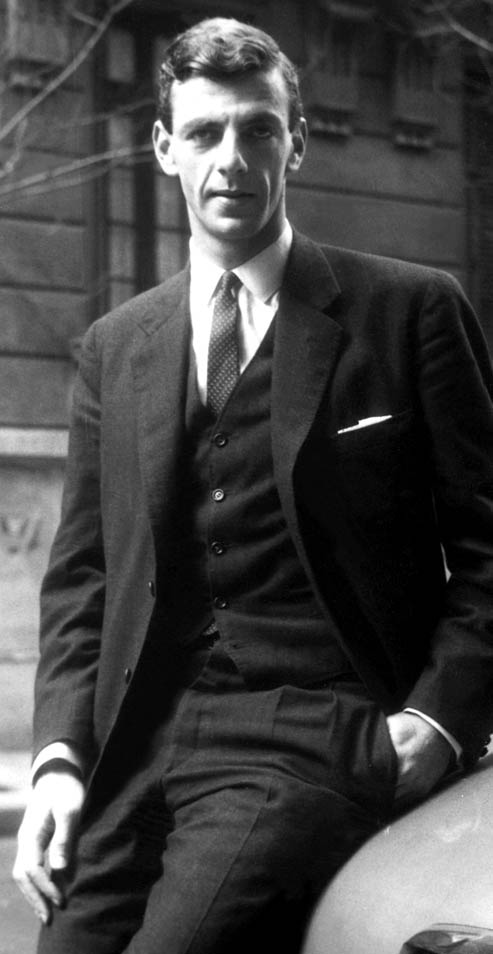
Menotti in 1962

Menotti was born on 22 October 1938 in Rosario, Argentina. At the time, his father was working in San Miguel de Tucumán and the window of time to register his birth had already passed by the time he returned. Menotti was therefore registered as if he had been born on the day that his father went to the registry office, 5 November. While Menotti's documentation always carried the 5 November date, he always celebrated his birthday on 22 October.

Menotti was the only child of Antonio Menotti and Olga Fasola, and grew up in Barrio Fisherton in Rosario. As a child he was nicknamed Cito, a shortening of Césarcito ("Little César"), though he believed it was a reference to Racing Club player Vicente Zito. He was known as El Flaco ("Slim") later in life. Antonio Menotti, an accomplished boxer and footballer, died of cancer in 1955, aged 51. The elder Menotti was a heavy smoker, a habit that the younger was also known for. César Luis Menotti had a growth removed from his right lung in 2011.

Menotti died on 5 May 2024, at the age of 85, after being hospitalized for a month with severe anemia. The cause of death was stomach cancer. His funeral was held two days later at the Argentine Football Association's complex in Rosario, attended by figures including 1978 captain Daniel Passarella and incumbent national manager Lionel Scaloni. The President of Argentina, Javier Milei, described Menotti as a leader who had given "one of the biggest joys to the country".

=== Personality, influence and political views ===
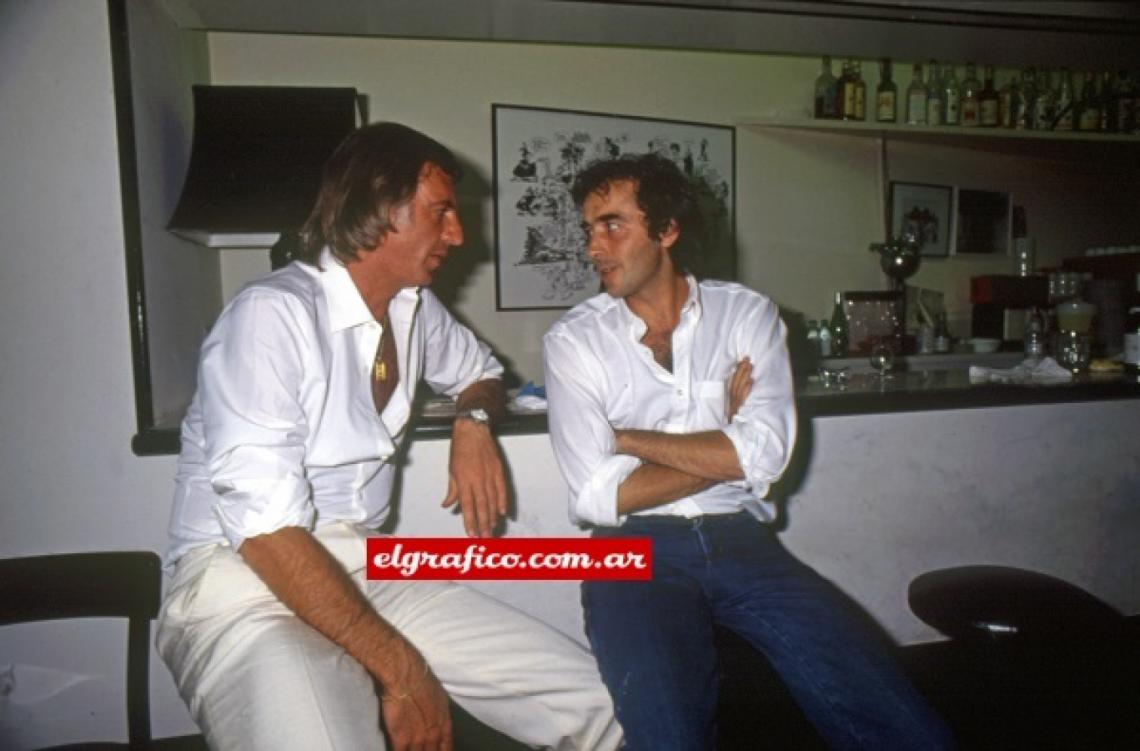
Menotti and one of his heroes, singer Joan Manuel Serrat, in 1984

Menotti always displayed a rebellious streak and cultivated an image of coolness. He wore long hair, dressed casually, and used to drop references to cultural icons in his conversations, from writer Ernesto Sabato to singer Joan Manuel Serrat. He was opinionated on politics, projecting a left-wing socialist image that contrasted with his holding a very visible post during the right-wing military dictatorship.

Menotti proclaimed:

There's a right-wing football and a left-wing football. Right-wing football wants to suggest that life is struggle. It demands sacrifices. We have to become of steel and win by any method... obey and function, that's what those with power want from the players. That's how they create retards, useful idiots that go with the system.

== Honours ==
=== Player ===
Boca Juniors

- Primera División: 1965

Santos

- Campeonato Brasileiro Série A: 1968

=== Manager ===
Huracán

- Primera División: 1973 Metropolitano

Barcelona

- Copa del Rey: 1982–83
- Copa de la Liga: 1983
- Supercopa de España: 1983

Argentina Youth

- Toulon Tournament: 1975
- FIFA U-20 World Cup: 1979
- South American Games: 1982

Argentina

- FIFA World Cup: 1978

=== Individual ===
- World Soccer 22nd Greatest Manager of All Time: 2013
