= Matias Fonseca =

Matias Fonseca may refer to:

- Matías Fonseca (footballer, born 1995), Argentine football forward
- Matias Fonseca (footballer, born 2001), Italian football forward for Montevideo Wanderers
