= Rodolfo De Jonge =

Argentine footballer

Personal information
- Date of birth: 1909
- Position: Defender

International career
Years	Team	Apps	(Gls)
1931–1935	Argentina	4	(0)

Rodolfo De Jonge (born 1909, date of death unknown) was an Argentine footballer. He played in four matches for the Argentina national football team from 1931 to 1935. He was also part of Argentina's squad for the 1935 South American Championship.
