= Enrique Araneda =

Chilean footballer (1907-2001)

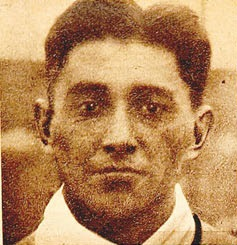

Personal information
- Date of birth: 11 November 1907
- Date of death: 10 December 2001 (aged 94)
- Position: Midfielder

International career
Years	Team	Apps	(Gls)
1935	Chile	3	(0)

Enrique Araneda (11 November 1907 – 10 December 2001) was a Chilean footballer. He played in three matches for the Chile national football team in 1935. He was also part of Chile's squad for the 1935 South American Championship.
