= Conrado Welsh =

Chilean footballer (1908-1954)

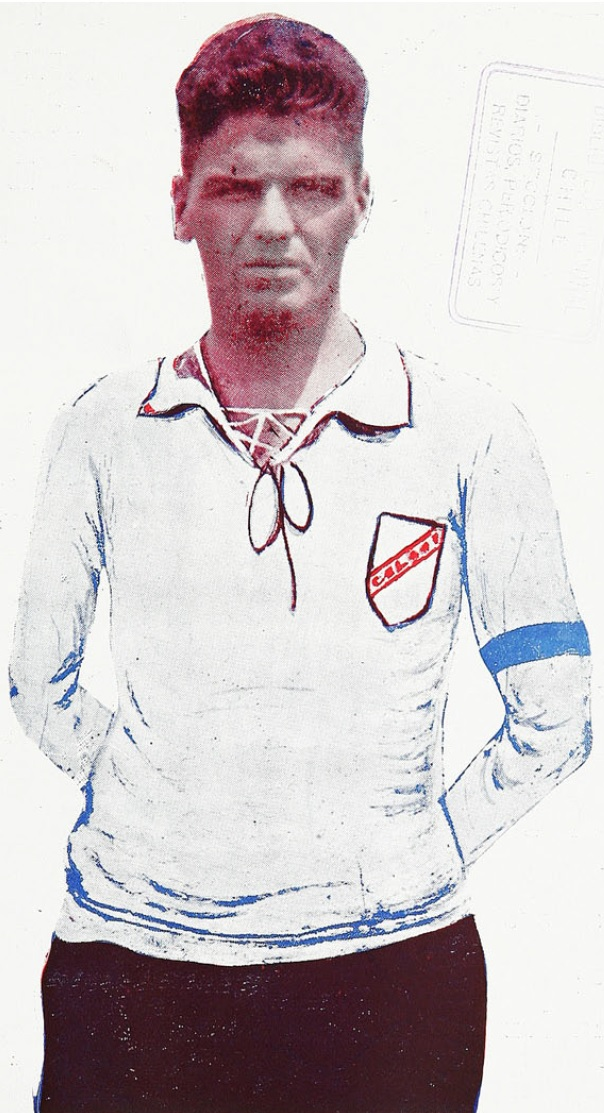
- Welch in 1934

Personal information
- Full name: Conrado Heriberto Welsh Shepperd
- Date of birth: 1908
- Place of birth: Valparaíso, Chile
- Date of death: 1954 (aged 45–46)
- Position: Defender

International career
Years	Team	Apps	(Gls)
1935	Chile	3	(0)

Conrado Welsh (1908 – 1954) was a Chilean footballer. He played in three matches for the Chile national football team in 1935. He was also part of Chile's squad for the 1935 South American Championship.
