= Antonio De Mare =

Argentine footballer

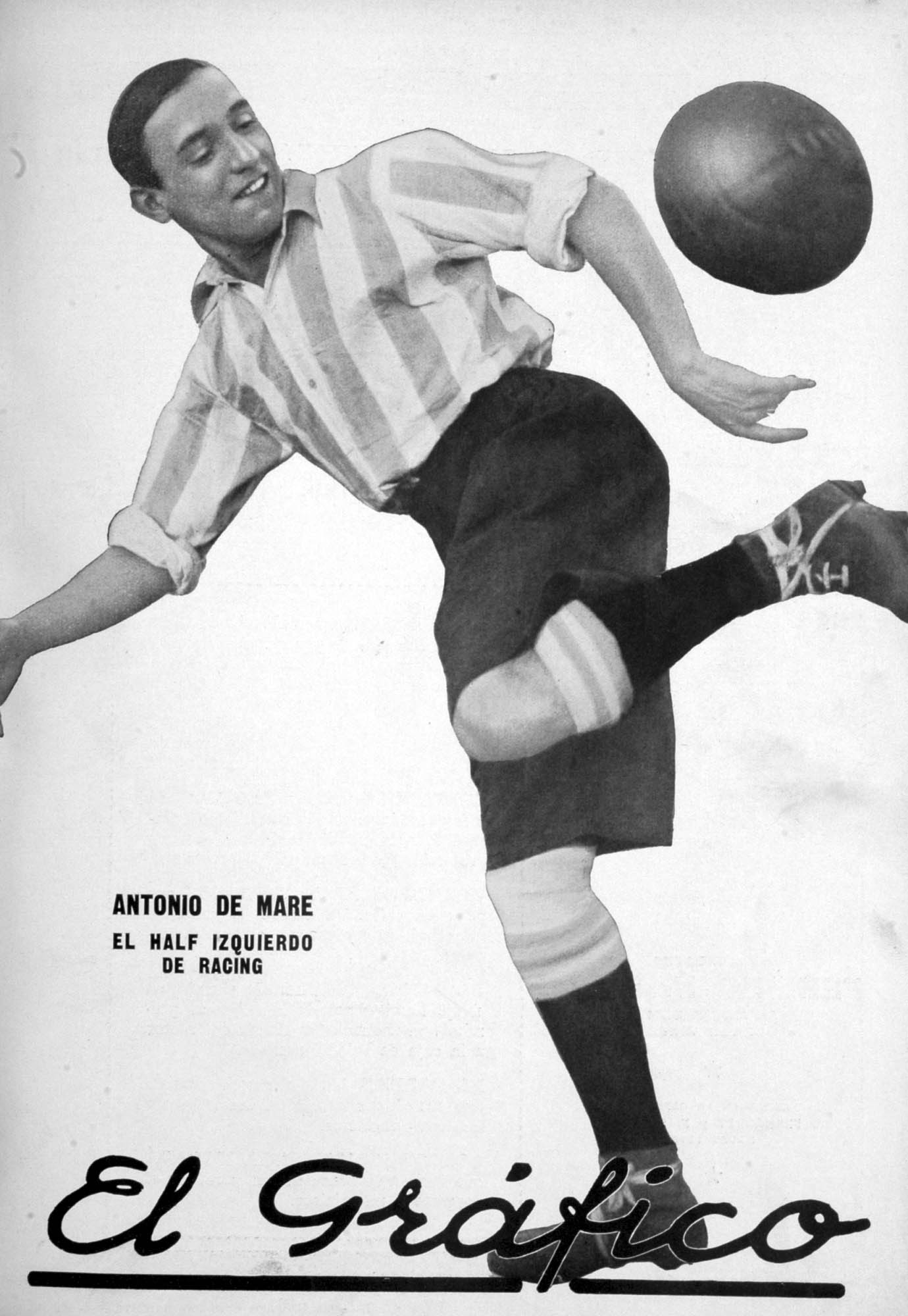
- De Mare on the cover of El Gráfico in 1930

Personal information
- Date of birth: 11 December 1909
- Place of birth: Argentina
- Date of death: 3 September 1969 (aged 59)
- Place of death: Avellaneda, Buenos Aires, Argentina
- Position: Defender

Senior career*
Years	Team	Apps	(Gls)
1926–1938	Racing Club	142	(2)
1939–1940	Juventus		

International career
1935	Argentina	3	(0)

Managerial career
- Universidad Católica (youth)
- 1943–1946: Universidad Católica
- 1958–1959: Palestino
- * Club domestic league appearances and goals

Antonio De Mare (11 December 1909 – 3 September 1969) was an Argentine footballer. He played in three matches for the Argentina national football team in 1935. He was also part of Argentina's squad for the 1935 South American Championship.

== Career ==
A left-half, De Mare played for Racing Club de Avellaneda from 1926 to 1938. In 1939, he moved to Italy and played for Juventus.

As a football coach, De Mare led Chilean clubs Universidad Católica and Palestino. He also coached the Universidad Católica youth ranks.
