= Vicente Zito =

Argentine footballer

Personal information
- Full name: Vicente Antonio Zito
- Date of birth: 24 November 1912
- Place of birth: Quilmes, Argentina
- Date of death: 26 July 1989 (aged 76)
- Position: Forward

International career
Years	Team	Apps	(Gls)
1933–1935	Argentina	4	(0)

Vicente Zito (24 November 1912 – 26 July 1989) was an Argentine footballer. He played in four matches for the Argentina national football team from 1933 to 1935. He was also part of Argentina's squad for the 1935 South American Championship.
