= Carlos Giudice =

Chilean footballer (1906–1979)

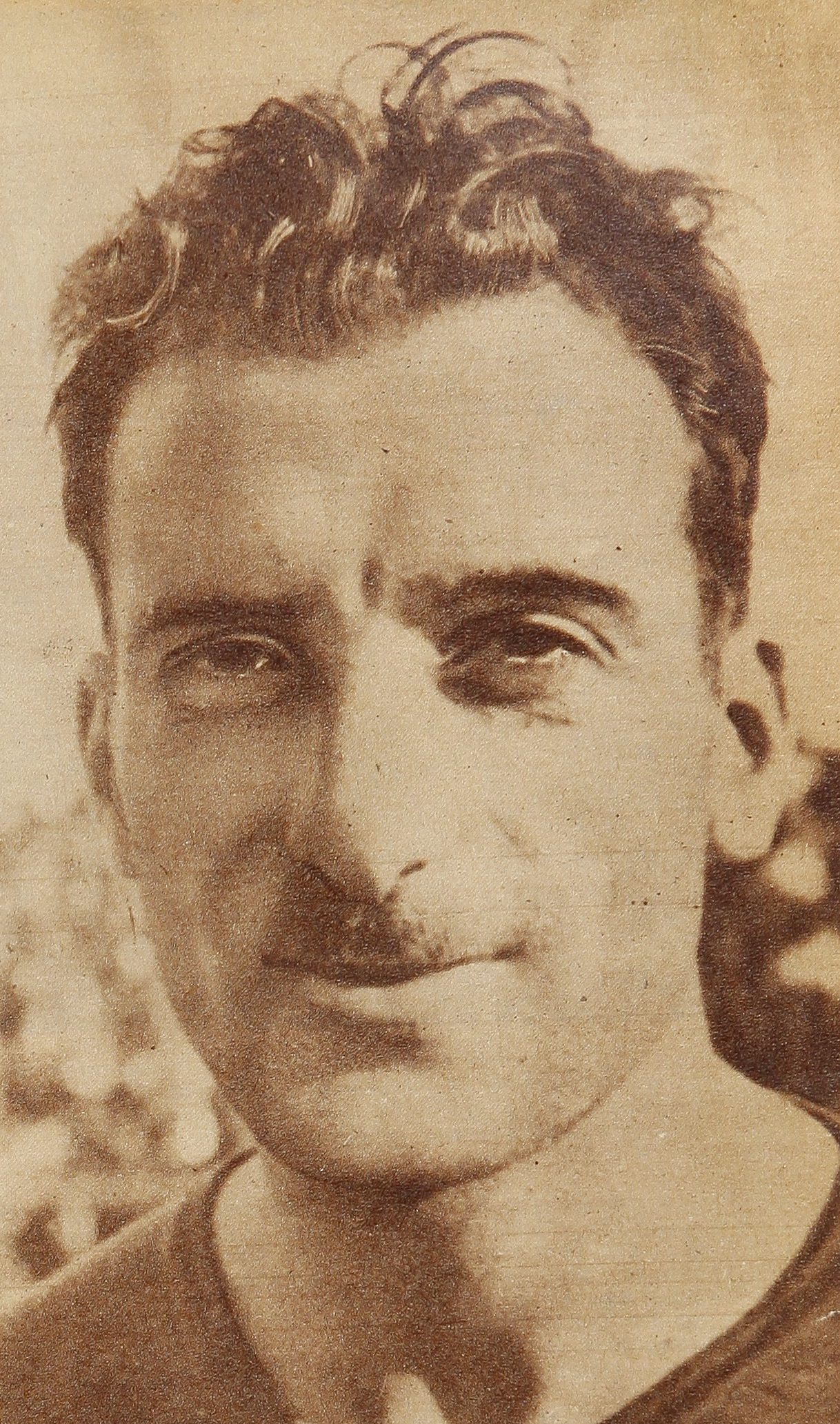
- Giudice in 1943.

Personal information
- Full name: Joaquín Carlos Giudice Ghío
- Date of birth: 3 June 1906
- Place of birth: Villa Alemana, Chile
- Date of death: 12 October 1979 (aged 73)
- Place of death: Santiago, Chile
- Height: 1.85 m (6 ft 1 in)
- Position: Forward

Youth career
- Peñablanca FC

Senior career*
| Years | Team | Apps | (Gls) |
| 1926–1932 | Santiago Wanderers | | |
| 1928 | Sportiva Italiana | | |
| 1933 | Peñarol | | |
| 1934–1939 | Audax Italiano | | |

International career
| 1935 | Chile | 3 | (1) |

Managerial career
- 1935: Chile
- * Club domestic league appearances and goals

Joaquín Carlos Giudice Ghío (3 June 1906 – 12 October 1979), known as Carlos Giudice, was a Chilean footballer.

== Career ==
He is one of the greatest players in Audax Italiano history.

At international level, he made 3 appearances for the Chile national team and scored one goal in the 1935 South American Championship. At the championship, he performed as the team captain as well as the deputy director of Chilean delegation and the team coach alongside Joaquín Morales, the head director of the delegation.

== Honours ==
=== Club ===
Audax Italiano

- Campeonato Nacional (Chile): 1936

=== Individual ===
- Campeonato Nacional (Chile) Top-Scorer: 1934
