= Jorge Alberti (footballer) =

Argentine footballer

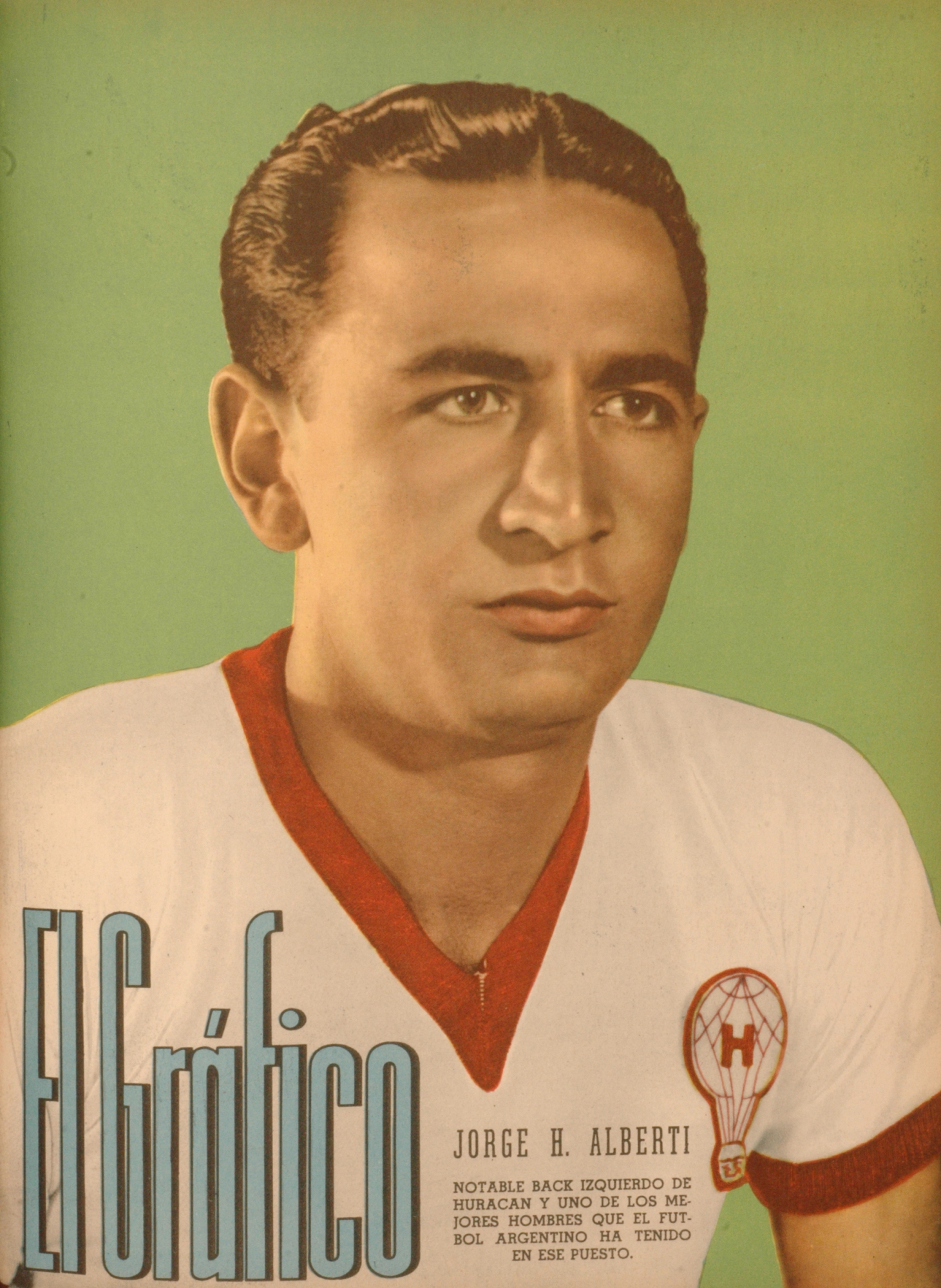

Personal information
- Date of birth: 18 May 1912
- Place of birth: Buenos Aires, Argentina
- Date of death: 1985 (aged 72–73)
- Position: Defender

International career
Years	Team	Apps	(Gls)
1940–1945	Argentina	23	(1)

Jorge Alberti (18 May 1912 – 1985) was an Argentine footballer. He played in 23 matches for the Argentina national football team from 1940 to 1945. He was also part of Argentina's squad for the 1941 South American Championship.

== Honours ==
Huracán

- Copa Adrián C. Escobar: 1942, 1943
- Copa de Competencia: 1944

Argentina

- Copa América: 1941
