= Marcelino Pérez (footballer, born 1912) =

Uruguayan footballer (1912–1983)

Personal information
- Full name: Marcelino Pérez Jardón
- Date of birth: 23 October 1912
- Date of death: 1983 (aged 70–71)

International career
Years	Team	Apps	(Gls)
1933–1935	Uruguay	2	(0)

Marcelino Pérez Jardón (23 October 1912 – 1983) was an Uruguayan footballer. He played in two matches for the Uruguay national team in 1933 and 1935. He was also part of Uruguay's squad for the 1935 South American Championship.
