= Matías Fonseca (footballer, born 1995) =

Argentine footballer

Personal information
- Full name: Matías Nicolás Fonseca
- Date of birth: 4 October 1995 (age 31)
- Place of birth: San José de Feliciano, Argentina
- Height: 1.73 m (5 ft 8 in)
- Position: Forward

Youth career
- Feliciano
- Lanús
- 2015–2018: Patronato

Senior career*
Years	Team	Apps	(Gls)
2018–2020	Patronato	2	(0)
2019	→ San Ramón (loan)		
2019–2020	→ Gimnasia CdU (loan)	17	(2)
2020	Juventud Unida	7	(0)
2021	Villa Ramallo	15	(0)
- * Club domestic league appearances and goals as of 21:05, 17 April 2022 (UTC)

Matías Nicolás Fonseca (born 4 October 1995) is an Argentine professional footballer who plays as a forward.

== Career ==
Fonseca started his career with local side Feliciano, prior to joining Lanús and subsequently Patronato. He first featured for the club's senior squad in May 2018, when manager Juan Pablo Pumpido selected him as a substitute for Primera División fixtures with Temperley and Banfield; though he didn't make an appearance in either encounter. Fonseca's professional debut arrived on 1 September 2018, when the forward was subbed on for the last eleven minutes of an away loss to Banfield. He made one more appearance, in October against Rosario Central, before departing on loan to Costa Rican club A.D. Municipal San Ramón in January 2019 for six months. After returning, he was loaned out once again, this time to Gimnasia y Esgrima.

After seventeen matches and two goals, scored home and away versus Boca Unidos, Fonseca returned from Torneo Federal A to his parent club in June 2020. However, he was soon released following the expiration of his contract.

In November 2020, Fonseca moved to Juventud Unida Universitario. In 2021, Fonseca played for Villa Ramallo.

== Career statistics ==
As of 15 October 2020.

Club statistics
Club	Season	League			Cup		League Cup		Continental		Other		Total	
Club	Season	Division	Apps	Goals	Apps	Goals	Apps	Goals	Apps	Goals	Apps	Goals	Apps	Goals
Patronato	2017–18	Primera División	0	0	0	0	—		—		0	0	0	0
Patronato	2018–19	Primera División	2	0	0	0	0	0	—		0	0	2	0
Patronato	2019–20	Primera División	0	0	0	0	0	0	—		0	0	0	0
Patronato	Total		2	0	0	0	0	0	—		0	0	2	0
Gimnasia y Esgrima (loan)	2019–20	Torneo Federal A	17	2	0	0	—		—		0	0	17	2
Career total			19	2	0	0	0	0	—		0	0	19	2
