= Luis de la Fuente =

Luis de la Fuente may refer to:

- Luís de la Fuente (bishop) (died 1566), bishop of Nicaragua
- Luis de la Fuente (footballer, born 1914) (1914–1972), Mexican footballer
  - Estadio Luis "Pirata" Fuente, stadium in Veracruz, Mexico, named for him
- Luis de la Fuente (footballer, born 1961), Spanish footballer and manager
