= Arturo Carmona (footballer) =

Chilean footballer (1909-1966)

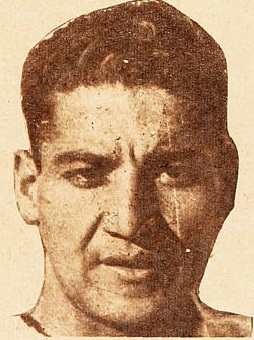

Personal information
- Date of birth: 28 September 1909
- Date of death: 4 December 1966 (aged 57)
- Position: Forward

International career
Years	Team	Apps	(Gls)
1935–1937	Chile	8	(1)

Arturo Carmona (28 September 1909 – 4 December 1966) was a Chilean footballer. He played in eight matches for the Chile national football team from 1935 to 1937. He was also part of Chile's squad for the 1935 South American Championship.
