= Diego García (footballer, born 1907) =

Argentine footballer

Personal information
- Date of birth: 23 January 1907
- Position: Forward

International career
| Years | Team | Apps | (Gls) |
| 1935–1936 | Argentina | 5 | (4) |

Diego García (born 23 January 1907, date of death unknown) was an Argentine footballer. He played in five matches for the Argentina national football team in 1935 and 1936, scoring four goals. He was also part of Argentina's squad for the 1935 South American Championship.
