= José Morales (footballer, born 1909) =

Peruvian footballer (1909–1944)

Personal information
- Full name: José Morales
- Date of birth: 30 October 1909
- Place of birth: Peru
- Date of death: 2 November 1944 (aged 35)

International career
| Years | Team | Apps | (Gls) |
| 1936 | Peru | 2 | (0) |

Jose Morales (30 October 1909 – 2 November 1944) was a Peruvian international football player. During his career, he participated with the Peru national football team in the 1936 Summer Olympics held in Berlin, Germany.
