= Aníbal Ciocca =

Uruguayan footballer (1915–1981)

Anibal Ciocca
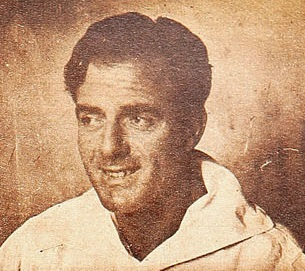

Personal information
- Full name: Anibal Ciocca
- Date of birth: 23 June 1915
- Place of birth: Montevideo, Uruguay
- Date of death: 7 November 1981 (aged 69)
- Position: Striker

Youth career
- ?-1932: Montevideo Wanderers

Senior career*
Years	Team	Apps	(Gls)
1932-1947	Nacional	354	(154)

International career
1935-1943	Uruguay	20	(6)
Medal record
Representing Uruguay
South American Championship
Winner	1935 Peru
Winner	1942 Uruguay
- * Club domestic league appearances and goals

Aníbal Ciocca (23 June 1912 – 7 November 1981) was a Uruguayan football-player notably active during the 1930s and 1940s, member of the forward line that conquered the Quinquenio de Oro (five consecutive Uruguayan league titles from 1939 to 1943) for Nacional. He won the 1935 and 1942 Copa Américas with Uruguay.

He came to Nacional in 1932 from Montevideo Wanderers.

In Nacional he was Uruguayan champion eight times: in 1933, 1934, 1939, 1940, 1941, 1942, 1943 and 1946.

== National team ==
He played for the Uruguay national football team on 20 occasions, in which he scored 6 goals.

He was part of the teams that won the Copa América in 1935 and 1942. He also played in the 1939 Copa América.

== Clubs ==
Club	Country	Year
Montevideo Wanderers	Uruguay	?-1932
Nacional	Uruguay	1932—1947

== Honours ==
=== National Tournaments ===
Cup	Club	Country	Year
Uruguayan Primera División	Nacional	Uruguay	1933
Uruguayan Primera División	Nacional	Uruguay	1934
Uruguayan Primera División	Nacional	Uruguay	1939
Uruguayan Primera División	Nacional	Uruguay	1940
Uruguayan Primera División	Nacional	Uruguay	1941
Uruguayan Primera División	Nacional	Uruguay	1942
Uruguayan Primera División	Nacional	Uruguay	1943
Uruguayan Primera División	Nacional	Uruguay	1946

=== International honours ===
Cup	Team	Year
Copa América	Uruguay	1935
Copa América	Uruguay	1942
