= Antonio Campilongo =

Argentine footballer

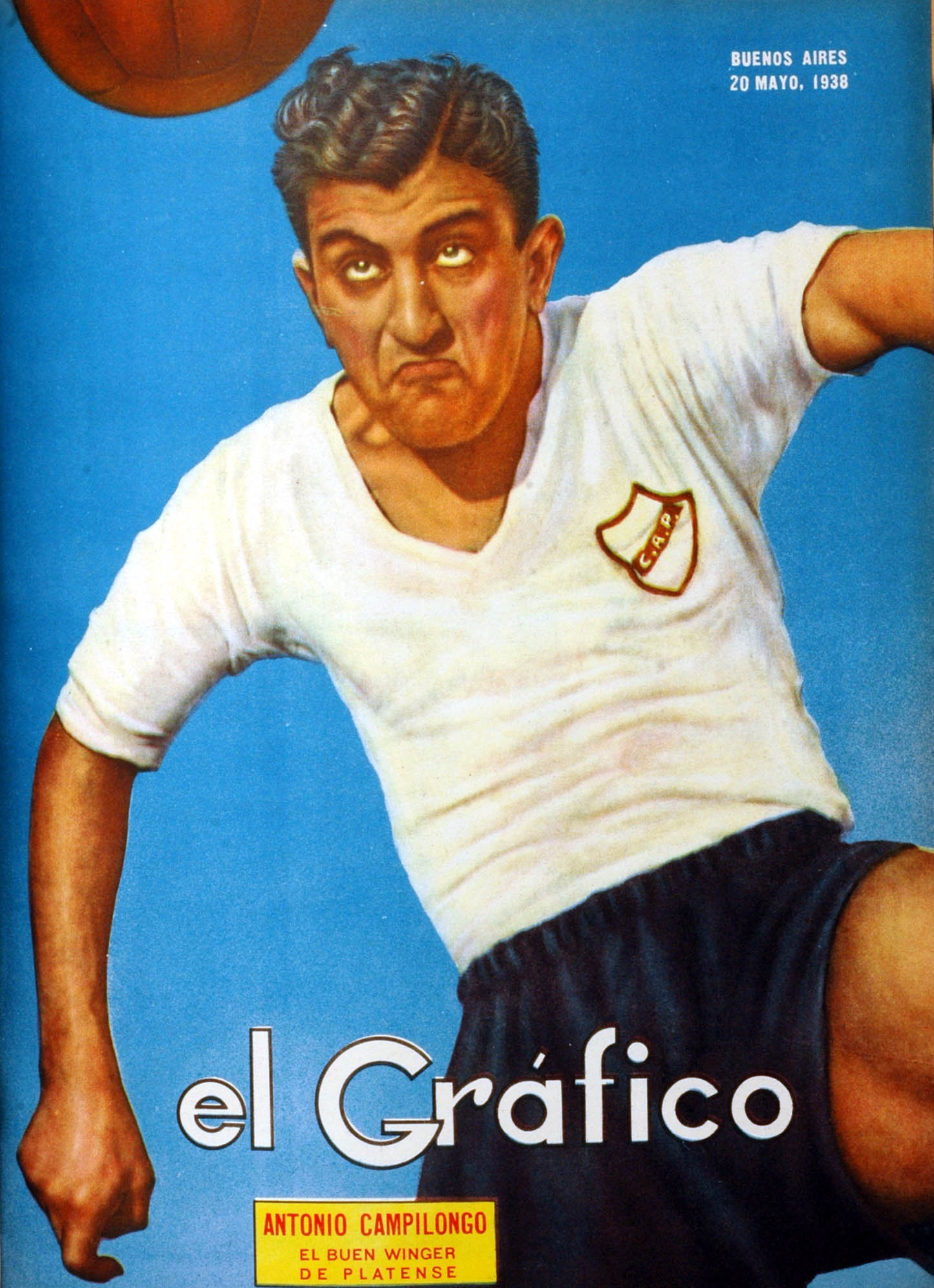

Personal information
- Date of birth: November 18, 1911
- Place of birth: Buenos Aires, Argentina
- Height: 1.70 m (5 ft 7 in)
- Position: Midfielder

Senior career*
Years	Team	Apps	(Gls)
1931–1939	Platense	228	(42)
1939–1940	Roma	10	(2)
- * Club domestic league appearances and goals

Antonio Campilongo (born November 18, 1911) was an Argentine professional football player.

He played one season (1939/40, 10 games, 2 goals) in the Serie A for A.S. Roma. He also held Italian citizenship.
