= 1935 South American Championship =

Football tournament

Tournament details
- Host country: Peru
- Dates: 6–27 January
- Teams: 4 (from 1 confederation)
- Venue: 1 (in 1 host city)

Final positions
- Champions: Uruguay (7th title)
- Runners-up: Argentina
- Third place: Peru
- Fourth place: Chile

Tournament statistics
- Matches played: 6
- Goals scored: 18 (3 per match)
- Top scorer(s): (Argentina) Herminio Masantonio (4 goals)

The 1935 South American Championship was the thirteenth edition of the football tournament, held from 6–27 January 1935 in Lima, Peru, used for Argentina, Chile, Peru, and Uruguay to qualify for the 1936 Summer Olympics. Brazil, Bolivia and Paraguay did not join the tournament.

There was some doubt the tournament would take place as during the 1930 FIFA World Cup, where Uruguay defeated Argentina, 4–2 in the final match, Argentina broke off football relations with their Uruguayan counterparts, claiming to have been heavily pressured, and that aggressions had been directed at them, before and during the tournament.

Six years after the previous edition, it was decided to continue the tournament. This tournament is classified as Extraordinary Championship (Campeonato extraordinario in Spanish) and did not have a trophy in dispute. The tournament was held on the occasion of the fourth centenary of the founding of the city of Lima.

== Squads ==
For a complete list of participating squads see: 1935 South American Championship squads

== Venues ==
Lima
Estadio Nacional
Capacity: 40,000
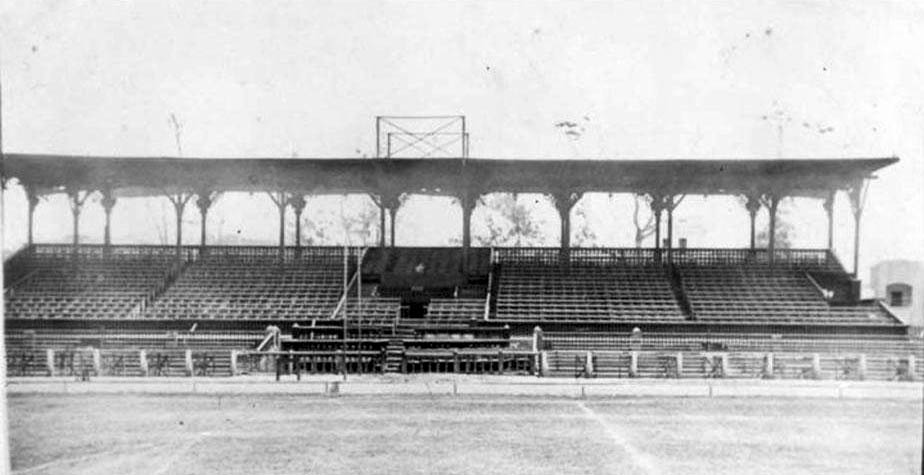

== Final round ==
Each team played three matches. Two points were awarded for a win, one point for a draw and no points for a loss.

Team	Pld	W	D	L	GF	GA	GD	Pts
Uruguay	3	3	0	0	6	1	+5	6
Argentina	3	2	0	1	8	5	+3	4
Peru	3	1	0	2	2	5	−3	2
Chile	3	0	0	3	2	7	−5	0

6 January 1935

Argentina	4–1	Chile
Lauri 28'; Arrieta 49'; García 57'; Masantonio 71'		Carmona 8'

Estadio Nacional, Lima
Referee: Miguel Serra Hurtado (Peru)

13 January 1935

Uruguay	1–0	Peru
H. Castro 80'

Estadio Nacional, Lima
Referee: Humberto Reginato (Chile)

18 January 1935

Uruguay	2–1	Chile
Ciocca 33', 55'		Giudice 54'

Estadio Nacional, Lima
Referee: José Artemio Serra (Peru)

20 January 1935

Argentina	4–1	Peru
Masantonio 10', 61', 81'; García 50'		T. Fernández 2'

Estadio Nacional, Lima
Referee: César Pioli (Uruguay)

26 January 1935

Peru	1–0	Chile
Montellanos 50'

Estadio Nacional, Lima
Referee: Eduardo Forte (Argentina)

27 January 1935

Argentina	0–3	Uruguay
		H. Castro 18'; Taboada 28'; Ciocca 36'

Estadio Nacional, Lima
Referee: Humberto Reginato (Chile)

== Result ==
1935 South American Championship champions

Uruguay
Seventh title

== Goal scorers ==
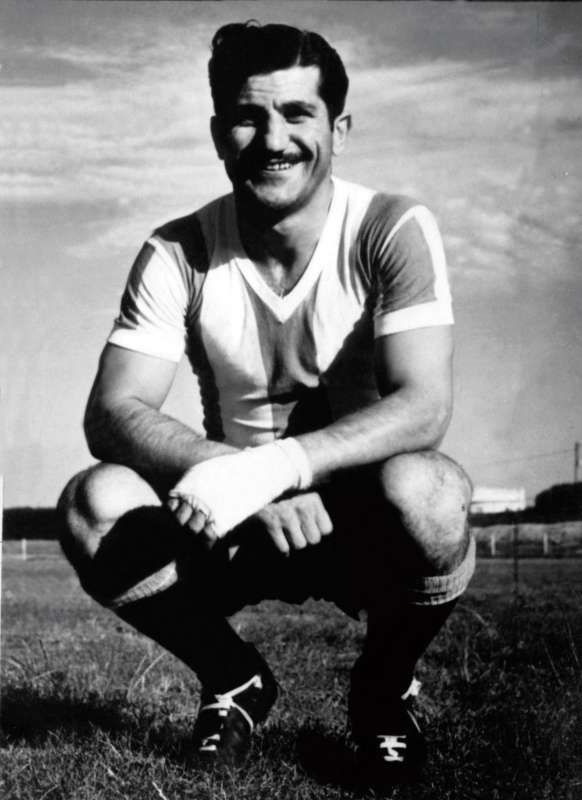
Herminio Masantonio, top scorer

4 goals

- (Argentina) Herminio Masantonio

3 goals

- (Uruguay) Aníbal Ciocca

2 goals

- (Argentina) Diego García
- (Uruguay) Héctor Castro

1 goal

- (Argentina) Arturo Arrieta
- (Argentina) Miguel Angel Lauri
- (Chile) Arturo Carmona
- (Chile) Carlos Giudice
- (Peru) Teodoro Fernández
- (Peru) Alberto Montellanos
- (Uruguay) José A. Taboada
