= 1941 South American Championship squads =

List of footballers

The following squads were named for the 1941 South American Championship that took place in Chile.

== Argentina ==
Head coach: (Argentina) Guillermo Stábile

No.	Pos.	Player	Date of birth (age)	Caps	Goals	Club
—	FW	Ricardo Alarcón	12 January 1914 (aged 27)	4	0	(Argentine Football Association) Boca Juniors
—	DF	Jorge Alberti	18 May 1912 (aged 28)	9	0	(Argentine Football Association) Huracán
—	FW	Gabino Arregui	7 November 1914 (aged 26)	6	2	(Argentine Football Association) Gimnasia y Esgrima (LP)
—	FW	Luis Arrieta	8 March 1914 (aged 26)	8	6	(Argentine Football Association) Lanús
—	MF	José Batagliero	1 January 1916 (aged 25)	5	0	(Argentine Football Association) Atlanta
—	FW	Alberto Belén	22 June 1917 (aged 23)	5	2	(Argentine Football Association) Newell's Old Boys
—	DF	Sabino Coletta	12 May 1914 (aged 26)	6	0	(Argentine Football Association) Independiente
—	MF	Bartolomé Colombo	24 August 1916 (aged 24)	6	0	(Argentine Football Association) San Lorenzo
—	MF	Gregorio Esperón	15 August 1912 (aged 28)	4	1	(Argentine Football Association) Platense
—	GK	Juan Estrada	28 October 1912 (aged 28)	14	0	(Argentine Football Association) Boca Juniors
—	FW	Enrique García	20 November 1912 (aged 28)	24	6	(Argentine Football Association) Racing Club
—	FW	Juan Gayol		2	0	(Argentine Football Association) Newell's Old Boys
—	DF	Lorenzo Gilli	21 May 1905 (aged 35)	2	0	(Argentine Football Association) San Lorenzo
—	GK	Sebastián Gualco	26 April 1912 (aged 28)	11	0	(Argentine Football Association) San Lorenzo
—	FW	Juan Marvezzi	16 November 1915 (aged 25)	6	4	(Argentine Football Association) Tigre
—	MF	José María Minella	6 August 1909 (aged 31)	20	0	(Argentine Football Association) River Plate
—	FW	José Manuel Moreno	3 August 1916 (aged 24)	14	6	(Argentine Football Association) River Plate
—	FW	Adolfo Pedernera	15 November 1918 (aged 22)	5	1	(Argentine Football Association) River Plate
—	DF	José Salomón	9 July 1916 (aged 24)	12	0	(Argentine Football Association) Racing Club
—	FW	Antonio Sastre	27 April 1911 (aged 29)	30	5	(Argentine Football Association) Independiente
—	MF	Roberto Sbarra	8 August 1912 (aged 28)	7	0	(Argentine Football Association) Estudiantes (LP)
—	MF	Eusebio Videla		3	0	(Argentine Football Association) Tigre

== Chile ==
Head coach: (Hungary) Máximo Garay

No.	Pos.	Player	Date of birth (age)	Caps	Goals	Club
—	MF	Manuel Arancibia	25 May 1908 (aged 32)	3	2	(Football Federation of Chile) Green Cross
—	FW	José Avendaño	2 August 1912 (aged 28)	11	3	(Football Federation of Chile) Magallanes
—	DF	Roberto Cabrera	2 January 1914 (aged 27)	0	0	(Football Federation of Chile) Audax Italiano
—	MF	Osvaldo Carvajal	15 November 1914 (aged 26)	0	0	(Football Federation of Chile) Green Cross
—	MF	Armando Contreras	15 June 1919 (aged 21)	0	0	(Football Federation of Chile) Colo-Colo
—	DF	Ascanio Cortés	5 July 1914 (aged 26)	12	0	(Football Federation of Chile) Audax Italiano
—	MF	Alfonso Domínguez	18 December 1916 (aged 24)	4	1	(Football Federation of Chile) Colo-Colo
—	DF	Oscar Ellis	3 May 1909 (aged 31)	0	0	(Football Federation of Chile) Santiago Morning
—	DF	Segundo Flores	6 March 1906 (aged 34)	0	0	(Football Federation of Chile) Colo-Colo
—	GK	Sergio Livingstone	26 March 1920 (aged 20)	0	0	(Football Federation of Chile) Universidad Católica
—	FW	Desiderio Medina	10 October 1919 (aged 21)	0	0	(Football Federation of Chile) Everton
—	MF	Juan Muñoz	8 February 1912 (aged 28)	0	0	(Football Federation of Chile) Bádminton
—	MF	José Pastenes	10 July 1915 (aged 25)	0	0	(Football Federation of Chile) Colo-Colo
—	FW	Raúl Pérez	21 June 1915 (aged 25)	0	0	(Football Federation of Chile) River Plate de Valdivia
—	DF	Humberto Roa	21 February 1912 (aged 28)	1	0	(Football Federation of Chile) Audax Italiano
—	FW	David Ruíz	23 July 1912 (aged 28)	0	0	(Football Federation of Chile) Audax Italiano
—	MF	Oscar Sánchez	2 April 1910 (aged 30)	0	0	(Football Federation of Chile) Universidad de Chile
—	FW	Enrique Sorrel	3 February 1912 (aged 28)	6	2	(Football Federation of Chile) Colo-Colo
—	FW	Raúl Toro	21 February 1911 (aged 29)	9	11	(Football Federation of Chile) Santiago Morning
—	MF	Héctor Trejo	15 July 1919 (aged 21)	0	0	(Football Federation of Chile) Audax Italiano
—	DF	Luis Vidal	30 March 1916 (aged 24)	0	0	(Football Federation of Chile) Universidad Católica

== Ecuador ==
Head coach: (Argentina) Juan Parodi

No.	Pos.	Player	Date of birth (age)	Caps	Goals	Club
—	MF	Vicente Aguirre		0	0	(Ecuadorian Football Federation)
—	FW	Marino Alcívar	21 May 1916 (aged 24)	4	2	(Ecuadorian Football Federation) Emelec
—	DF	Clemente Angulo		0	0	(Ecuadorian Football Federation)
—	FW	Ernesto Cevallos		4	0	(Ecuadorian Football Federation)
—	DF	Luis Contreras		0	0	(Ecuadorian Football Federation)
—	DF	Vicente Delgado		0	0	(Ecuadorian Football Federation)
—	FW	César Augusto Freire	18 November 1911 (aged 29)	3	0	(Ecuadorian Football Federation)
—	MF	Carlos Garnica	23 September 1917 (aged 23)	0	0	(Ecuadorian Football Federation)
—	DF	Humberto Gavilánez		0	0	(Ecuadorian Football Federation)
—	FW	José Herrera	15 June 1907 (aged 33)	0	0	(Ecuadorian Football Federation)
—	DF	Luis Hungría	25 August 1915 (aged 25)	1	0	(Ecuadorian Football Federation)
—	MF	Jorge Laurido		1	0	(Ecuadorian Football Federation)
—	MF	Luis Antonio Mendoza	25 August 1914 (aged 26)	0	0	(Ecuadorian Football Federation)
—	MF	José Merino	15 April 1915 (aged 25)	2	0	(Ecuadorian Football Federation)
—	GK	Ignacio Molina		0	0	(Ecuadorian Football Federation) 9 de Octubre
—	MF	José Peralta		4	0	(Ecuadorian Football Federation)
—	FW	Enrique Raymondi Chávez		0	0	(Ecuadorian Football Federation)
—	MF	Alfonso Romo		0	0	(Ecuadorian Football Federation) 9 de Octubre
—	GK	Luis Santoliva		0	0	(Ecuadorian Football Federation)
—	FW	Eduardo Stacey		0	0	(Ecuadorian Football Federation)
—	FW	Alfonso Suárez Rizzo	24 June 1913 (aged 27)	4	0	(Football Federation of Chile) Santiago Wanderers

== Peru ==
Head coach: (Spain) Domingo Arrillaga

No.	Pos.	Player	Date of birth (age)	Caps	Goals	Club
—	MF	Gerardo Arce	22 September 1917 (aged 23)	0	0	(Peruvian Football Federation) Alianza Lima
—	MF	Vicente Arce	22 January 1910 (aged 31)	6	0	(Peruvian Football Federation) Sporting Tabaco
—	FW	Teodoro Fernández	20 May 1913 (aged 27)	17	19	(Peruvian Football Federation) Universitario de Deportes
—	MF	Alejandro González	17 March 1915 (aged 25)	0	0	(Peruvian Football Federation)
—	GK	Juan Honores	24 March 1915 (aged 25)	7	0	(Peruvian Football Federation) Universitario de Deportes
—	FW	Marcial Hurtado	30 June 1919 (aged 21)	0	0	(Peruvian Football Federation) Sport Boys
—	DF	Guillermo Janneau	29 July 1918 (aged 22)	0	0	(Peruvian Football Federation) Alianza Lima
—	DF	Orestes Jordán	21 November 1913 (aged 27)	7	0	(Peruvian Football Federation) Universitario de Deportes
—	MF	Máximo Lobatón	13 August 1914 (aged 26)	0	0	(Football Federation of Chile) Magallanes
—	DF	Pedro Luna		0	0	(Peruvian Football Federation)
—	FW	Adelfo Magallanes	29 August 1910 (aged 30)	8	1	(Peruvian Football Federation) Alianza Lima
—	MF	Pedro Magán		0	0	(Peruvian Football Federation)
—	FW	Roberto Morales	11 January 1921 (aged 20)	0	0	(Peruvian Football Federation) Sporting Tabaco
—	DF	Enrique Perales	18 January 1914 (aged 27)	0	0	(Peruvian Football Federation) Universitario de Deportes
—	DF	Carlos Portal	11 April 1911 (aged 29)	1	0	(Peruvian Football Federation) Sport Boys
—	FW	Leopoldo Quiñónez		0	0	(Peruvian Football Federation) Deportivo Municipal
—	DF	Juan Quispe	18 July 1914 (aged 26)	2	0	(Peruvian Football Federation) Ciclista Lima
—	FW	César Socarraz	5 June 1910 (aged 30)	0	0	(Peruvian Football Federation) Universitario de Deportes
—	FW	Manuel Vallejas		0	0	(Peruvian Football Federation)

== Uruguay ==
Head coach: (Uruguay) José Pedro Cea

No.	Pos.	Player	Date of birth (age)	Caps	Goals	Club
—	FW	Antonio Álvarez		0	0	(Uruguayan Football Association) Racing de Montevideo
—	FW	Juan Cabrera		0	0	(Uruguayan Football Association) Nacional
—	DF	Avelino Cadilla	5 June 1910 (aged 30)	3	0	(Uruguayan Football Association) River Plate
—	GK	Juan Carvidón	18 August 1917 (aged 23)	0	0	(Uruguayan Football Association) Montevideo Wanderers
—	FW	Ubaldo Cruche	25 May 1920 (aged 20)	0	0	(Uruguayan Football Association) Peñarol
—	FW	Oscar Chirimini	28 March 1917 (aged 23)	5	1	(Uruguayan Football Association) River Plate
—	MF	Alberto Delgado		0	0	(Uruguayan Football Association) Rampla Juniors
—	MF	Schubert Gambetta	14 April 1920 (aged 20)	0	0	(Uruguayan Football Association) Nacional
—	MF	Sixto González		0	0	(Uruguayan Football Association) Liverpool
—	FW	Héctor Magliano	30 November 1919 (aged 21)	1	0	(Uruguayan Football Association) Montevideo Wanderers
—	DF	Carlos Martínez		0	0	(Uruguayan Football Association) Rampla Juniors
—	FW	José María Medina	13 February 1921 (aged 19)	0	0	(Uruguayan Football Association) Montevideo Wanderers
—	GK	Aníbal Luis Paz	21 May 1917 (aged 23)	2	0	(Uruguayan Football Association) Nacional
—	FW	Roberto Porta	7 June 1913 (aged 27)	10	4	(Uruguayan Football Association) Nacional
—	MF	Juan Riephoff	27 February 1922 (aged 18)	1	0	(Uruguayan Football Association) Rampla Juniors
—	FW	Ismael Rivero		2	2	(Uruguayan Football Association) Rampla Juniors
—	DF	Héctor Romero		0	0	(Uruguayan Football Association) Nacional
—	MF	Obdulio Varela	20 September 1917 (aged 23)	2	0	(Uruguayan Football Association) Montevideo Wanderers
—	FW	Bibiano Zapirain	2 December 1919 (aged 21)	0	0	(Uruguayan Football Association) Nacional
