= Argentina national football team records and statistics =

This is a list of statistical records for the Argentina national football team.

== Individual records ==
As of 6 October 2026
Players in bold are still active with Argentina.

=== Most-capped players ===
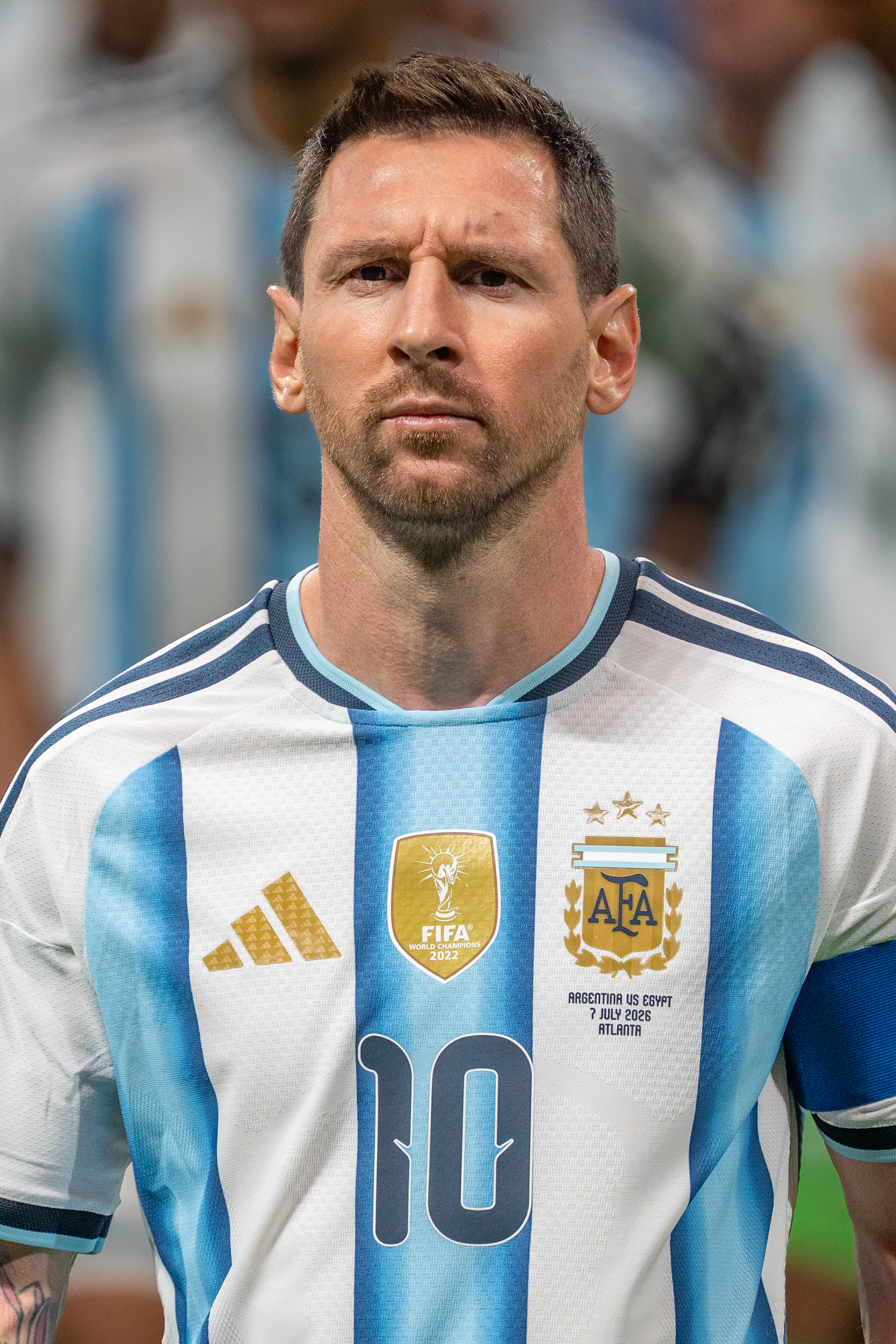
Lionel Messi is Argentina's most-capped player and all-time top goalscorer.

Rank	Player	Caps	Goals	Career
1	Lionel Messi	208	126	2005–2026
2	Javier Mascherano	147	3	2003–2018
3	Ángel Di María	145	31	2008–2024
3	Javier Zanetti	145	5	1994–2011
5	Nicolás Otamendi	140	9	2009–2026
6	Roberto Ayala	115	7	1994–2007
7	Diego Simeone	104	11	1988–2002
8	Sergio Agüero	101	41	2006–2021
9	Oscar Ruggeri	97	7	1983–1994
10	Sergio Romero	96	0	2009–2018

=== Top goalscorers ===
Rank	Player	Goals	Caps	Ratio	Career
1	Lionel Messi (list)	126	208	0.61	2005–2026
2	Gabriel Batistuta (list)	56	78	0.72	1991–2002
3	**Lautaro Martínez**	42	87	0.48	2018–present
4	Sergio Agüero	41	101	0.41	2006–2021
5	Hernán Crespo	35	64	0.55	1995–2007
6	Diego Maradona (list)	34	91	0.37	1977–1994
7	Gonzalo Higuaín	31	75	0.41	2009–2018
7	Ángel Di María	31	145	0.21	2008–2024
9	Luis Artime	24	25	0.96	1961–1967
10	Leopoldo Luque	22	45	0.49	1975–1981
10	Daniel Passarella	22	70	0.31	1976–1986

=== Top assisters ===
Rank	Player	Assists	Caps	Ratio	Career
1	Lionel Messi	67	208	0.32	2005–2026
2	Ángel Di María	29	145	0.2	2008–2024
3	Diego Maradona	26	91	0.29	1977–1994
4	Ariel Ortega	21	88	0.24	1993–2010
5	Juan Román Riquelme	17	51	0.33	1997–2008
6	**Giovani Lo Celso**	16	69	0.24	2017–present
7	Sergio Agüero	15	101	0.15	2006–2021
8	Claudio López	12	55	0.22	1995–2003
8	Juan Sebastián Verón	12	72	0.17	1996–2010
8	Carlos Tevez	12	76	0.16	2004–2015

=== World Cup winning captains ===
World Cup winning captains of Argentina

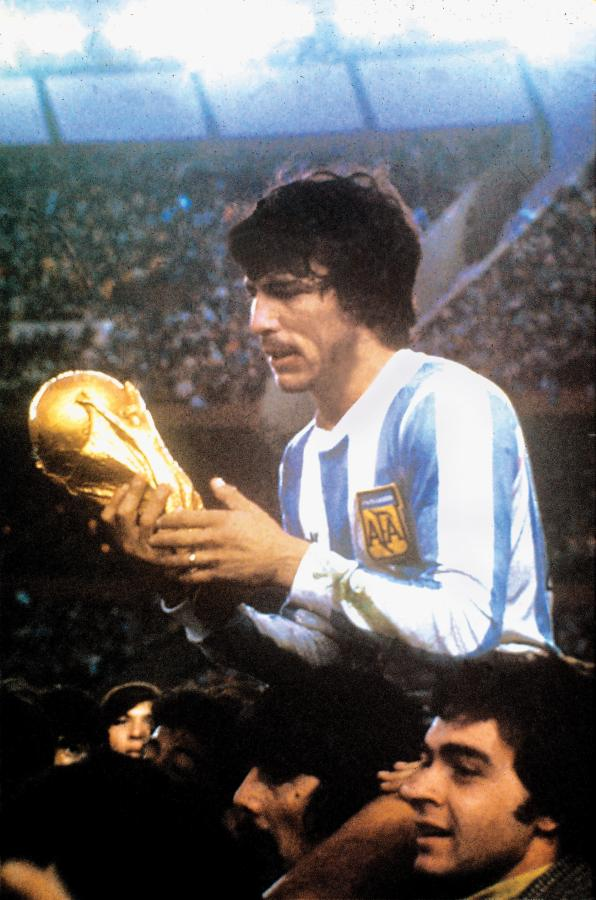
Daniel Passarella in 1978

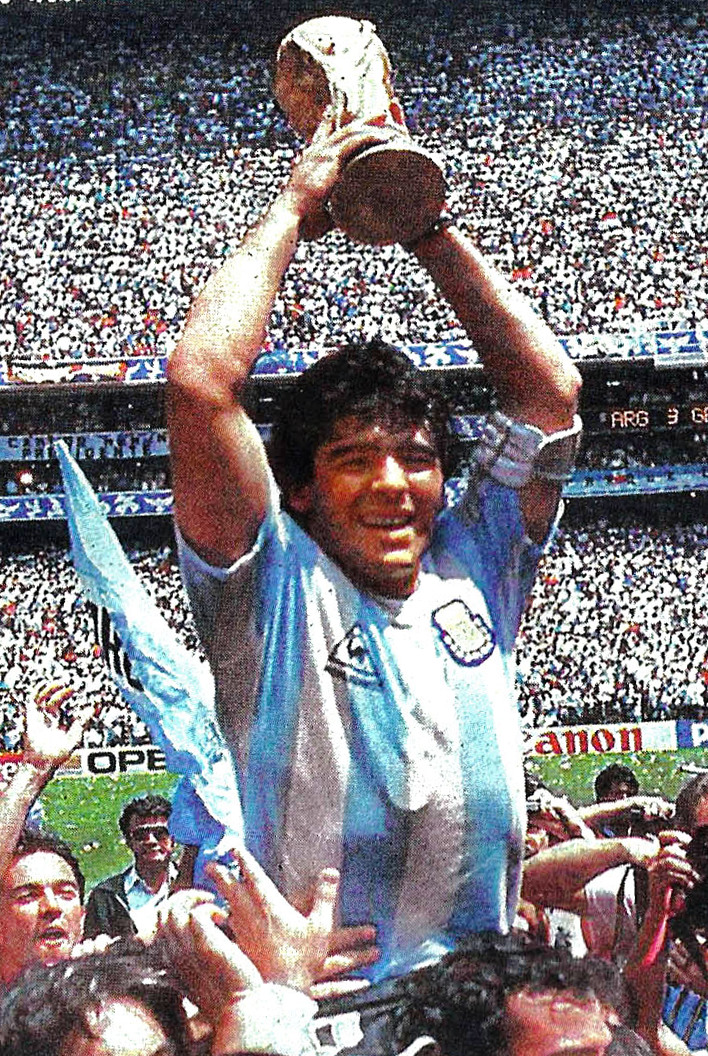
Diego Maradona in 1986

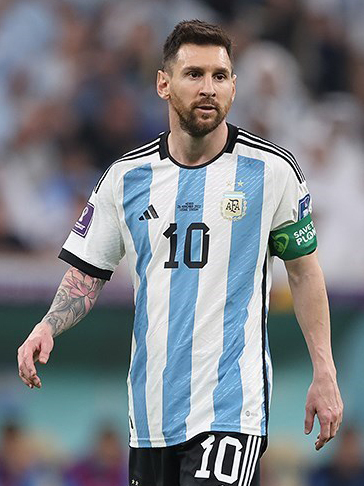
Lionel Messi in 2022

Year	Player	Caps	Goals
1978	Daniel Passarella	70	22
1986	Diego Maradona	91	34
2022	Lionel Messi	208	126

=== Caps ===
- Most capped player overall: **208** – Lionel Messi, 2005–2026
- Most FIFA World Cup tournaments played: **6** – Lionel Messi in 2006, 2010, 2014, 2018, 2022 and 2026
- Most FIFA World Cup appearances made: **34** – Lionel Messi
- Most FIFA World Cup appearances made as captain: **26** – Lionel Messi
- Most CONMEBOL FIFA World Cup qualification appearances made: **72** – Lionel Messi
- Most Copa América tournaments played: **7** – Lionel Messi in 2007, 2011, 2015, 2016, 2019, 2021, 2024
- Most Copa América appearances made: **39** – Lionel Messi
- Youngest player: Diego Maradona, 16 years, 120 days old against Hungary on 27 February 1977.
- Youngest player to appear in a competitive match: Franco Mastantuono, 17 years and 296 days old against Chile on 5 June 2025 at the 2026 FIFA World Cup qualifiers.
- Youngest player to reach 100 caps: Lionel Messi, 27 years, 361 days old against Jamaica at the 2015 Copa América on 20 June 2015.
- Youngest player to appear in a FIFA World Cup match: Lionel Messi, 18 years, 357 days old against Serbia and Montenegro on 16 June 2006.
- Youngest player to appear in a FIFA World Cup match as captain: Lionel Messi, 22 years, 363 days old against Greece on 22 June 2010.
- Oldest player: Ángel Labruna, 39 years, 260 days old against Czechoslovakia at the 1958 FIFA World Cup on 15 June 1958.

=== Goals/assists ===
- Most goals scored: **126** – Lionel Messi, 2005–2026
- Most goals scored in competitive matches: **71** – Lionel Messi
- Most goals scored in international friendlies: **55** – Lionel Messi
- Youngest goalscorer: Diego Maradona, 18 years, 7 months and 4 days old against Scotland on 2 June 1979.
- Youngest player to score in a FIFA World Cup match: Lionel Messi, 18 years, 357 days old against Serbia and Montenegro on 16 June 2006.
- Oldest goalscorer: Lionel Messi, 39 years and 104 days old against Benin on 6 October 2026.
- Most hat-tricks scored in all international competitions, including friendlies: **11** – Lionel Messi
- Most goals scored in a single match: **5** – Juan Marvezzi against Ecuador on 16 February 1941, Lionel Messi against Estonia on 5 June 2022.
- Most goals scored in a calendar year in all international competitions, including friendlies: **18** – Lionel Messi in 2022.
- Most direct free kick goals scored in all international competitions, including friendlies: **12** – Lionel Messi
- Most FIFA World Cup tournaments scored in: **5** – Lionel Messi in 2006, 2014, 2018, 2022 and 2026.
- Most goals scored at the FIFA World Cup: **21** – Lionel Messi
- Most goals scored at one FIFA World Cup: **8** – Guillermo Stábile in 1930 and Lionel Messi in 2026
- Most hat-tricks scored at the FIFA World Cup: **2** – Gabriel Batistuta
- Most goals scored in FIFA World Cup finals: **2** – Mario Kempes in 1978 and Lionel Messi in 2022
- Most goals scored in CONMEBOL FIFA World Cup qualification matches: **36** – Lionel Messi
- Most goals scored in one CONMEBOL FIFA World Cup qualification campaign: **10** – Lionel Messi in 2014 FIFA World Cup qualification
- Most hat-tricks scored in CONMEBOL FIFA World Cup qualification matches: **3** – Lionel Messi
- Most direct free kick goals scored in CONMEBOL FIFA World Cup qualification matches: **4** – Juan Román Riquelme and Lionel Messi
- Most Copa América tournaments scored in: **6** – Lionel Messi in 2007, 2015, 2016, 2019, 2021 and 2024
- Most goals scored at the Copa América: **17** – Norberto Méndez
- Most goals scored at one Copa América: **9** – Humberto Maschio in 1957
- Most direct free kick goals scored at the Copa América: **4** – Lionel Messi
- Most assists provided in all international competitions, including friendlies: **67** – Lionel Messi
- Most FIFA World Cup tournaments assisted in: **6** – Lionel Messi in 2006, 2010, 2014, 2018, 2022 and 2026
- Most assists provided at the FIFA World Cup: **12** – Lionel Messi
- Most assists provided in CONMEBOL FIFA World Cup qualification matches: **13** – Lionel Messi
- Most Copa América tournaments assisted in: **7** – Lionel Messi in 2007, 2011, 2015, 2016, 2019, 2021 and 2024
- Most assists provided at the Copa América: **18** – Lionel Messi
- Most assists provided at one Copa América: **5** – Lionel Messi in 2021

=== World Cup awards and achievements ===
World Cup Golden Ball

The World Cup Golden Ball has been given by FIFA to the best player at the World Cup since 1982; Argentina players have won it thrice; Maradona in 1986 and Messi in 2014 and 2022.

World Cup top goalscorer

Guillermo Stábile in 1930 and Mario Kempes in 1978 were both the top-scoring players at their respective World Cups.

World Cup Golden Glove

The best goalkeeper at the World Cup is awarded the FIFA World Cup Golden Glove. In 2022 this award was won by Emiliano Martínez.

World Cup Young Player Award

The best player at the World Cup who is no older than 21 during the calendar year of the tournament is awarded the FIFA World Cup Young Player Award. In 2022 this award was won by Enzo Fernández.

=== Manager records ===
Most appearances
Guillermo Stábile: 123 Guillermo coached Argentina in 123 matches which made him among the few coaches who were in charge of more than 100 international matches. While still with the national team, he led them to victories in the South American Championship in 1941, 1945, 1946, 1947, 1955, and 1957.

== Competitive record ==
Champions Runners-up Third place Tournament played fully or partially on home soil

=== FIFA World Cup ===
FIFA World Cup record										Qualification record					
Year	Round	Position	Pld	W	D	L	GF	GA	Squad	Pld	W	D	L	GF	GA
(Uruguay) 1930	Runners-up	2nd	5	4	0	1	18	9	Squad	Qualified as invitees					
(Italy) 1934	Round of 16	9th	1	0	0	1	2	3	Squad	Qualified automatically					
(France) 1938	Withdrew									Withdrew					
(Brazil) 1950	Withdrew									Withdrew					
(Switzerland) 1954	Withdrew									Withdrew					
(Sweden) 1958	Group stage	13th	3	1	0	2	5	10	Squad	4	3	0	1	10	2
(Chile) 1962	Group stage	10th	3	1	1	1	2	3	Squad	2	2	0	0	11	3
(England) 1966	Quarter-finals	5th	4	2	1	1	4	2	Squad	4	3	1	0	9	2
(Mexico) 1970	Did not qualify									4	1	1	2	4	6
(West Germany) 1974	Quarter-finals (Note: Last 8 held as second group stage.)	8th	6	1	2	3	9	12	Squad	4	3	1	0	9	2
(Argentina) 1978	Champions	1st	7	5	1	1	15	4	Squad	Qualified as hosts					
(Spain) 1982	Second group stage	11th	5	2	0	3	8	7	Squad	Qualified as defending champions					
(Mexico) 1986	Champions	1st	7	6	1	0	14	5	Squad	6	4	1	1	12	6
(Italy) 1990	Runners-up	2nd	7	2	3	2	5	4	Squad	Qualified as defending champions					
(United States) 1994	Round of 16	10th	4	2	0	2	8	6	Squad	8	4	2	2	9	10
(France) 1998	Quarter-finals	6th	5	3	1	1	10	4	Squad	16	8	6	2	23	13
(South Korea) (Japan) 2002	Group stage	18th	3	1	1	1	2	2	Squad	18	13	4	1	42	15
(Germany) 2006	Quarter-finals	6th	5	3	2	0	11	3	Squad	18	10	4	4	29	17
(South Africa) 2010	Quarter-finals	5th	5	4	0	1	10	6	Squad	18	8	4	6	23	20
(Brazil) 2014	Runners-up	2nd	7	5	1	1	8	4	Squad	16	9	5	2	35	15
(Russia) 2018	Round of 16	16th	4	1	1	2	6	9	Squad	18	7	7	4	19	16
(Qatar) 2022	Champions	1st	7	4	2	1	15	8	Squad	17	11	6	0	27	8
(Canada) (Mexico) (United States) 2026	Runners-up	2nd	8	7	0	1	19	8	Squad	18	12	2	4	31	10
(Morocco) (Portugal) (Spain) 2030	Qualified as commemorative match hosts									Qualified as commemorative match hosts					
(Saudi Arabia) 2034	To be determined									To be determined					
Total	3 Title	19/23	96	54	17	25	171	109	—	171	98	44	29	293	145

=== Copa América ===
South American Championship / Copa América record
Year	Round	Position	Pld	W	D	L	GF	GA	Squad
(Argentina) 1916	Runners-up	2nd	3	1	2	0	7	2	Squad
(Uruguay) 1917	Runners-up	2nd	3	2	0	1	5	3	Squad
(Brazil) 1919	Third place	3rd	3	1	0	2	7	7	Squad
(Chile) 1920	Runners-up	2nd	3	1	2	0	4	2	Squad
(Argentina) 1921	Champions	1st	3	3	0	0	5	0	Squad
(Brazil) 1922	Fourth place	4th	4	2	0	2	6	3	Squad
(Uruguay) 1923	Runners-up	2nd	3	2	0	1	6	6	Squad
(Uruguay) 1924	Runners-up	2nd	3	1	2	0	2	0	Squad
(Argentina) 1925	Champions	1st	4	3	1	0	11	4	Squad
(Chile) 1926	Runners-up	2nd	4	2	1	1	14	3	Squad
(Peru) 1927	Champions	1st	3	3	0	0	15	4	Squad
(Argentina) 1929	Champions	1st	3	3	0	0	9	1	Squad
(Peru) 1935	Runners-up	2nd	3	2	0	1	8	5	Squad
(Argentina) 1937	Champions	1st	6	5	0	1	14	5	Squad
(Peru) 1939	Withdrew								
(Chile) 1941	Champions	1st	4	4	0	0	10	2	Squad
(Uruguay) 1942	Runners-up	2nd	6	4	1	1	21	6	Squad
(Chile) 1945	Champions	1st	6	5	1	0	22	5	Squad
(Argentina) 1946	Champions	1st	5	5	0	0	17	3	Squad
(Ecuador) 1947	Champions	1st	7	6	1	0	28	4	Squad
(Brazil) 1949	Withdrew								
(Peru) 1953	Withdrew								
(Chile) 1955	Champions	1st	5	4	1	0	18	6	Squad
(Uruguay) 1956	Third place	3rd	5	3	0	2	5	3	Squad
(Peru) 1957	Champions	1st	6	5	0	1	25	6	Squad
(Argentina) 1959	Champions	1st	6	5	1	0	19	5	Squad
(Ecuador) 1959	Runners-up	2nd	4	2	1	1	9	9	Squad
(Bolivia) 1963	Third place	3rd	6	3	1	2	15	10	Squad
(Uruguay) 1967	Runners-up	2nd	5	4	0	1	12	3	Squad
1975	Group stage	5th	4	2	0	2	17	4	Squad
1979	Group stage	8th	4	1	1	2	7	6	Squad
1983	Group stage	6th	4	1	3	0	5	4	Squad
(Argentina) 1987	Fourth place	4th	4	1	1	2	5	4	Squad
(Brazil) 1989	Third place	3rd	7	2	3	2	2	4	Squad
(Chile) 1991	Champions	1st	7	6	1	0	16	6	Squad
(Ecuador) 1993	Champions	1st	6	2	4	0	6	4	Squad
(Uruguay) 1995	Quarter-finals	5th	4	2	1	1	8	6	Squad
(Bolivia) 1997	Quarter-finals	6th	4	1	2	1	4	3	Squad
(Paraguay) 1999	Quarter-finals	8th	4	2	0	2	6	6	Squad
(Colombia) 2001	Withdrew								
(Peru) 2004	Runners-up	2nd	6	4	1	1	16	6	Squad
(Venezuela) 2007	Runners-up	2nd	6	5	0	1	16	6	Squad
(Argentina) 2011	Quarter-finals	7th	4	1	3	0	5	2	Squad
(Chile) 2015	Runners-up	2nd	6	3	3	0	10	3	Squad
(United States) 2016	Runners-up	2nd	6	5	1	0	18	2	Squad
(Brazil) 2019	Third place	3rd	6	3	1	2	7	6	Squad
(Brazil) 2021	Champions	1st	7	5	2	0	12	3	Squad
(United States) 2024	Champions	1st	6	5	1	0	9	1	Squad
Total	16 Titles	44/48	208	132	43	33	483	183	—

=== CONMEBOL–UEFA Cup of Champions ===
CONMEBOL–UEFA Cup of Champions record
Year	Round	Position	Pld	W	D	L	GF	GA
(France) 1985	Did not qualify							
(Argentina) 1993	Champions	1st	1	0	1	0	1	1
(England) 2022	Champions	1st	1	1	0	0	3	0
(Qatar) 2026	Cancelled							
Total	2 Title	2/3	2	1	1	0	4	1

=== FIFA Confederations Cup ===
FIFA Confederations Cup record
Year	Round	Position	Pld	W	D	L	GF	GA	Squad
(Saudi Arabia) 1992	Champions	1st	2	2	0	0	7	1	Squad
(Saudi Arabia) 1995	Runners-up	2nd	3	1	1	1	5	3	Squad
(Saudi Arabia) 1997	Did not qualify								
(Mexico) 1999	Did not qualify								
(South Korea) (Japan) 2001	Did not qualify								
(France) 2003	Did not qualify								
(Germany) 2005	Runners-up	2nd	5	2	2	1	10	10	Squad
(South Africa) 2009	Did not qualify								
(Brazil) 2013	Did not qualify								
(Russia) 2017	Did not qualify								
Total	1 Titles	3/10	10	5	3	2	22	14	—

=== Olympic Games ===
Olympic Games record
Year	Round	Position	Pld	W	D	L	GF	GA	Squad
(Greece) 1896	No football tournament								
(France) 1900	Only club teams participated								
(United States) 1904	Only club teams participated								
(United Kingdom) 1908	Did not participate								
(Sweden) 1912	Did not participate								
(Belgium) 1920	Did not participate								
(France) 1924	Did not participate								
(Netherlands) 1928	Runners-up	2nd	5	3	1	1	25	7	Squad
(United States) 1932	No football tournament								
(Nazi Germany) 1936	Did not participate								
(United Kingdom) 1948	Did not participate								
(Finland) 1952	Did not participate								
(Australia) 1956	Did not participate								
(Italy) 1960	Quarter-finals	7th	3	2	0	1	6	4	Squad
(Japan) 1964	Group stage	10th	2	0	1	1	3	4	Squad
(Mexico) 1968	Did not qualify								
(West Germany) 1972	Did not qualify								
(Canada) 1976	Did not qualify								
(Soviet Union) 1980	Qualified but withdrew								
(United States) 1984	Did not qualify								
(South Korea) 1988	Quarter-finals	8th	4	1	1	2	4	5	Squad
Since 1992	See Argentina national under-23 football team								
Total	Runners-up	4/19	14	6	3	5	38	20	—

=== Pan American Games ===
Pan American Games record
Year	Round	Position	Pld	W	D	L	GF	GA
(Argentina) 1951	Champions	1st	4	4	0	0	16	2
(Mexico) 1955	Champions	1st	6	5	1	0	23	7
(United States) 1959	Champions	1st	6	5	1	0	20	4
(Brazil) 1963	Runners-up	2nd	4	2	2	0	11	3
(Canada) 1967	Preliminary round	5th	3	1	1	1	7	3
(Colombia) 1971	Champions	1st	8	6	2	0	13	4
(Mexico) 1975	Third place	3rd	6	5	1	0	19	1
(Puerto Rico) 1979	Third place	3rd	5	4	1	0	9	0
(Venezuela) 1983	Preliminary round	5th	2	0	0	2	0	4
(United States) 1987	Third place	3rd	5	3	1	1	11	3
(Cuba) 1991	Did not qualify							
(Argentina) 1995	Champions	1st	6	4	2	0	10	4
Since 1999	See Argentina national under-23 football team							
Total	5 Title	11/12	55	39	12	4	139	35

== Head-to-head record ==
Below is a result summary of all matches Argentina has played against FIFA recognised teams.

As of 17 November 2026, after the match against Costa Rica

Positive record Neutral record Negative record

Opponents	Pld	W	D	L	GF	GA	GD	Win %
Albania	1	1	0	0	4	0	+4	100%
Algeria	2	2	0	0	7	3	+4	100%
Angola	2	2	0	0	4	0	+4	100%
Australia	9	7	1	1	16	8	+8	77.7%
Austria	3	2	1	0	8	2	+6	75.00%
Belarus	1	0	1	0	0	0	0	00.00%
Belgium	5	4	0	1	12	4	+8	80.00%
Benin	1	1	0	0	3	0	+3	100.00%
Bolivia	44	32	5	7	120	36	+84	73%
Bosnia and Herzegovina	3	3	0	0	9	1	+8	100%
Brazil (Note: There is a dispute in the official count of matches. Many sources do not count a few matches played between the first team of Argentina against Brazilian State Selection teams, or matches played between the first team of Argentina or Brazil against a "B" team of the rival, so they would not be "International Class A" matches. Many sources say that Argentina leads by 1 match (43–42), many others say that Argentina leads by 2 matches (41–39) and many others say Brazil leads by 1 match (43–42). For more information, see the article Argentina–Brazil football rivalry.)	111	43	26	42	167	167	0	38.7%
Bulgaria	9	8	0	1	18	6	+12	88.8%
Burkina Faso	1	1	0	0	7	0	+7	100%
Cameroon	2	0	1	1	2	3	−1	0%
Canada	3	3	0	0	9	0	+9	100%
Cape Verde	1	1	0	0	3	2	+1	100%
Chile	97	64	27	6	201	74	+127	65.9%
China	1	0	0	1	0	1	−1	0%
Colombia	43	21	12	10	74	42	+32	48.8%
Costa Rica	9	7	2	0	24	6	+18	77.7%
Croatia	6	3	1	2	8	7	+1	50%
Curaçao	1	1	0	0	7	0	+7	100%
Czechoslovakia	6	2	3	1	7	10	−3	33.3%
Denmark	2	0	1	1	1	3	−2	0%
East Germany	2	1	1	0	3	1	+2	50%
Ecuador	42	24	12	6	99	37	+62	57.1%
Egypt	3	3	0	0	11	2	+9	100%
El Salvador	3	3	0	0	7	0	+7	100%
England (Note: A match against England on 17 May 1953 was abandoned, and the result declared void, hence the number of matches played is greater than the total of wins/draws/losses.)	16	4	5	6	20	23	−3	31.25%
Estonia	1	1	0	0	5	0	+5	100%
France	13	6	4	3	18	14	+4	46.1%
Germany (Note: Includes matches against West Germany.)	23	10	6	7	34	33	+1	43.4%
Ghana	1	1	0	0	2	0	+2	100%
Greece	2	2	0	0	6	0	+6	100%
Guatemala	4	4	0	0	17	1	+16	100%
Haiti	3	3	0	0	12	1	+11	100%
Honduras	4	4	0	0	9	1	+8	100%
Hong Kong	1	1	0	0	7	0	+7	100%
Hungary	7	5	1	1	15	6	+9	71.4%
Iceland	2	1	1	0	4	1	3	50%
India	1	1	0	0	1	0	+1	100%
Indonesia	1	1	0	0	2	0	+2	100%
Iran	2	1	1	0	2	1	+1	50%
Iraq	1	1	0	0	4	0	+4	100%
Israel	5	3	1	1	14	6	+8	60%
Italy	16	5	5	6	18	22	−4	31.2%
Ivory Coast	2	2	0	0	6	1	+5	100%
Jamaica	4	4	0	0	11	1	+10	100%
Japan	7	6	0	1	15	4	+11	85.7%
Jordan	1	1	0	0	3	1	+2	100%
Libya	1	1	0	0	3	1	+2	100%
Lithuania	1	0	1	0	0	0	0	0%
Mauritania	1	1	0	0	2	1	+1	100%
Mexico	32	16	12	4	53	28	+25	50%
Morocco	2	2	0	0	4	1	+3	100%
Netherlands	10	1	5	4	8	15	−7	10%
Nicaragua	1	1	0	0	5	1	+4	100%
Nigeria	9	6	1	2	15	13	+2	66.6%
Northern Ireland	1	1	0	0	3	1	+2	100%
Norway	2	0	0	2	1	3	−2	0%
Panama	3	3	0	0	10	1	+9	100%
Paraguay	108	56	35	17	219	113	+106	51.8%
Peru	56	37	14	5	110	45	+65	66%
Poland	12	7	2	3	20	12	+8	58.3%
Portugal	8	5	1	2	13	7	+6	62.5%
Puerto Rico	1	1	0	0	6	0	+6	100%
Qatar	2	2	0	0	5	0	+5	100%
Republic of Ireland	6	5	1	0	8	1	+7	83.3%
Romania	9	6	2	1	12	6	+6	66.6%
Russia (Note: Includes matches against the Soviet Union.)	13	4	7	2	13	11	+2	30.7%
Saudi Arabia	5	2	2	1	8	5	+3	40%
Serbia and Montenegro (Note: Includes matches against Yugoslavia.)	10	5	2	3	21	15	+6	50%
Scotland	4	2	1	1	5	3	+2	50%
Singapore	1	1	0	0	6	0	+6	100%
South Africa	3	1	1	1	3	2	+1	50%
South Korea	3	3	0	0	8	2	+6	75%
Slovakia	1	1	0	0	6	0	+6	100%
Slovenia	1	1	0	0	2	0	+2	100%
Spain	15	6	2	7	18	20	−2	42.8%
Sweden	3	1	1	1	6	6	0	33.3%
Switzerland	8	6	2	0	18	4	+14	75%
Trinidad and Tobago	1	1	0	0	3	0	+3	100%
Tunisia	1	1	0	0	2	1	+1	100%
United Arab Emirates	1	1	0	0	5	0	+5	100%
United States	11	7	2	2	30	9	+21	63.6%
Uruguay	205	95	49	61	327	238	+89	46.34%
Venezuela	30	25	3	2	95	19	+76	83.3%
Wales	2	1	1	0	2	1	+1	50%
Zambia	1	1	0	0	5	0	+5	100%
Total (89)	1,114	622	265	226	2,136	1,116	+1,090	56%

== See also ==
- List of Argentina national football team hat-tricks
- Argentina–Uruguay football rivalry
- Argentina–England football rivalry
- Argentina–Brazil football rivalry
