= List of Argentina national football team hat-tricks =

List of Argentina national team hat-tricks

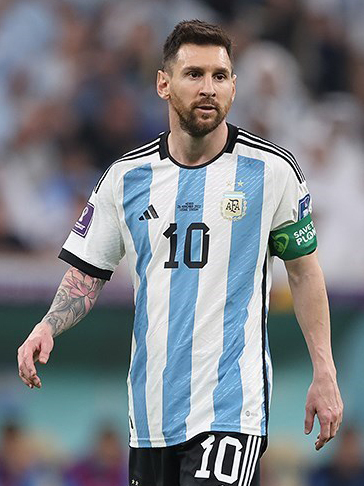
Lionel Messi holds the record for the most hat-tricks scored by an Argentine player, with eleven in total.

This page is a list of the hat-tricks scored for the Argentina national football team. Since Argentina's first international association football match in 1902, there have been 70 hat-tricks recorded. The first hat-trick was scored by Carlos Guidi against Uruguay in 1913. The most goals scored by a single player in a match is five, a record achieved by three different players: Juan Marvezzi against Ecuador in 1941; José Manuel Moreno against Ecuador in 1942; and Lionel Messi against Estonia in 2022.

Lionel Messi holds the record for most hat-tricks scored by an Argentinian player with eleven, with the first coming against Switzerland in 2012. Four Argentinians have scored hat-tricks at the FIFA World Cup: Guillermo Stábile at the 1930 edition against Mexico; Gabriel Batistuta at both the 1994 and 1998 editions against Greece and Jamaica; Gonzalo Higuaín at the 2010 edition against South Korea; and Lionel Messi at the 2026 edition against Algeria.

Argentina have conceded five hat-tricks in total, two coming against Brazil. The most notable hat-trick scored against Argentina was scored by Kylian Mbappé in the 2022 World Cup final; a tournament which Argentina ultimately went on to win on penalties.

== Hat-tricks scored by Argentina ==
| No. | Player | Date | Opponent | Venue | Goals | Result | Competition | Ref. |
|---|---|---|---|---|---|---|---|---|
| 1 | Carlos Guidi | 13 July 1913 | Uruguay | Montevideo, Uruguay | 3 – (9', 28', 30') | 4–5 | Friendly | |
| 2 | Maximiliano Susan | 15 August 1913 | Uruguay | Estadio Racing Club, Avellaneda, Argentina | 4 – (32', 45', 76', 87') | 4–0 | 1913 Copa Lipton | |
| 3 | Eduardo Hiller | 1 October 1916 | Uruguay | Estadio Racing Club, Avellaneda, Argentina | 3 – (20', 50', 71') | 7–2 | Friendly | |
| 4 | Edwin Clarke | 22 May 1919 | Chile | Estádio de Laranjeiras, Rio de Janeiro, Brazil | 3 – (10', 23', 62') | 4–1 | 1919 South American Championship | |
| 5 | Julio Libonatti | 19 October 1919 | Uruguay | Estadio GEBA, Buenos Aires, Argentina | 3 – (11', 80', 83') | 6–1 | 1919 Copa Premier Honor Argentino | |
| 6 | Manuel Seoane | 25 September 1921 | Chile | Valparaiso Sporting Club, Viña del Mar, Chile | 3 – (15', 70', 73') | 4–1 | Friendly | |
| 7 | Vicente Aguirre | 29 October 1923 | Paraguay | Estadio Gran Parque Central, Montevideo, Uruguay | 3 – (58', 77', 86') | 4–3 | 1923 South American Championship | |
| 8 | Manuel Seoane (2) | 3 December 1923 | Chile | Buenos Aires, Argentina | 3 | 6–0 | Friendly | |
| 9 | Domingo Tarasconi | 3 December 1923 | Chile | Buenos Aires, Argentina | 3 | 6–0 | Friendly | |
| 10 | Osvaldo Goicoechea | 25 May 1924 | Uruguay | Estadio Sportivo Barracas, Buenos Aires, Argentina | 3 – (21', 29', 66') | 4–0 | 1924 Copa Newton | |
| 11 | Manuel Seoane (3) | 13 December 1925 | Brazil | Estadio Sportivo Barracas, Buenos Aires, Argentina | 3 – (41', 48', 74') | 4–1 | 1925 South American Championship | |
| 12 | Gabino Sosa | 20 October 1926 | Paraguay | Campos de Sports de Ñuñoa, Santiago, Chile | 4 – (11', 32', 59', 87') | 8–0 | 1926 South American Championship | |
| 13 | Roberto Cherro | 29 May 1928 | United States | Olympic Stadium, Amsterdam, Netherlands | 3 – (47', 49', 57') | 11–2 | 1928 Summer Olympics | |
| 14 | Domingo Tarasconi (2) | 29 May 1928 | United States | Olympic Stadium, Amsterdam, Netherlands | 4 – (24', 63', 66', 89') | 11–2 | 1928 Summer Olympics | |
| 15 | Domingo Tarasconi (3) | 2 June 1928 | Belgium | Olympic Stadium, Amsterdam, Netherlands | 4 – (1', 10', 75', 89') | 6–3 | 1928 Summer Olympics | |
| 16 | Domingo Tarasconi (4) | 6 June 1928 | Egypt | Olympic Stadium, Amsterdam, Netherlands | 3 – (37', 54', 61') | 6–0 | 1928 Summer Olympics | |
| 17 | Guillermo Stábile | 19 July 1930 | Mexico | Estadio Centenario, Montevideo, Uruguay | 3 – (8', 17', 80') | 6–3 | 1930 FIFA World Cup | |
| 18 | Roberto Cherro (2) | 5 February 1933 | Uruguay | Estadio de Independiente, Avellaneda, Argentina | 4 – (7', 48', 79' pen., 87') | 4–1 | Friendly | |
| 19 | Herminio Masantonio | 20 January 1935 | Peru | Estadio Nacional, Lima, Peru | 3 – (10', 61', 81') | 4–1 | 1935 South American Championship | |
| 20 | Alberto Zozaya | 9 January 1937 | Paraguay | Estadio Gasómetro, Buenos Aires, Argentina | 3 – (33', 75', 82') | 6–1 | 1937 South American Championship | |
| 21 | Herminio Masantonio (2) | 11 November 1937 | Uruguay | Estadio de Independiente, Avellaneda, Argentina | 3 – (1', 36' pen., 84') | 5–1 | 1937 Copa Lipton | |
| 22 | Ángel Laferrara | 2 March 1940 | Chile | Buenos Aires, Argentina | 3 – (42', 57', 68') | 4–1 | Friendly | |
| 23 | Carlos Peucelle | 5 March 1940 | Brazil | Buenos Aires, Argentina | 3 | 6–1 | 1940 Roca Cup | |
| 24 | Luis Arrieta | 9 March 1940 | Chile | Estadio Gasómetro, Buenos Aires, Argentina | 3 – (56', 74', 83') | 3–2 | Friendly | |
| 25 | Juan Marvezzi | 16 February 1941 | Ecuador | Estadio Nacional, Santiago, Chile | 5 – (3', 17', 28', 39', 59') | 6–1 | 1941 South American Championship | |
| 26 | José Manuel Moreno | 22 January 1942 | Ecuador | Estadio Centenario, Montevideo, Uruguay | 5 – (12', 16', 22', 32', 89') | 12–0 | 1942 South American Championship | |
| 27 | Herminio Masantonio (3) | 22 January 1942 | Ecuador | Estadio Centenario, Montevideo, Uruguay | 4 – (54', 65', 68', 70') | 12–0 | 1942 South American Championship | |
| 28 | René Pontoni | 9 January 1945 | Paraguay | Buenos Aires, Argentina | 3 | 5–3 | Friendly | |
| 29 | Norberto Méndez | 15 February 1945 | Brazil | Estadio Nacional, Santiago, Chile | 3 – (14', 20', 40') | 3–1 | 1945 South American Championship | |
| 30 | René Pontoni (2) | 2 December 1947 | Paraguay | Estadio George Capwell, Guayaquil, Ecuador | 3 – (40', 50', 82') | 6–0 | 1947 South American Championship | |
| 31 | Alfredo Di Stéfano | 18 December 1947 | Colombia | Estadio George Capwell, Guayaquil, Ecuador | 3 – (30', 62', 75') | 6–0 | 1947 South American Championship | |
| 32 | Rodolfo Micheli | 2 March 1955 | Paraguay | Estadio Nacional, Santiago, Chile | 4 – (5', 18' pen., 64', 83') | 5–3 | 1955 South American Championship | |
| 33 | Ángel Labruna | 27 March 1955 | Uruguay | Estadio Nacional, Santiago, Chile | 3 – (39', 71',87') | 6–1 | 1955 South American Championship | |
| 34 | Omar Sívori | 6 March 1956 | Costa Rica | Estadio Olímpico Universitario, Mexico City, Mexico | 3 – (60', 79', 85') | 4–3 | 1956 Panamerican Championship | |
| 35 | Humberto Maschio | 13 March 1957 | Colombia | Estadio Nacional, Lima, Peru | 4 – (16', 23', 53', 85') | 8–2 | 1957 South American Championship | |
| 36 | José Sanfilippo | 9 December 1959 | Paraguay | Estadio Modelo, Guayaquil, Ecuador | 3 – (8', 57', 89' pen.) | 4–2 | 1959 South American Championship | |
| 37 | José Sanfilippo (2) | 22 December 1959 | Brazil | Estadio Modelo, Guayaquil, Ecuador | 3 – (27', 89', 90') | 4–1 | 1959 South American Championship | |
| 38 | José Sanfilippo (3) | 27 August 1960 | Uruguay | Estadio Monumental, Buenos Aires, Argentina | 3 – (48', 59', 69') | 4–0 | 1960 Taça do Atlântico | |
| 39 | Raúl Savoy | 20 March 1963 | Ecuador | Estadio Félix Capriles, Cochabamba, Brazil | 3 – (34', 53', 90') | 4–2 | 1963 South American Championship | |
| 40 | Luis Artime | 8 December 1964 | Paraguay | Estadio Monumental, Buenos Aires, Argentina | 4 | 8–1 | Friendly | |
| 41 | Luis Artime (2) | 25 January 1967 | Venezuela | Estadio Centenario, Montevideo, Uruguay | 3 – (18', 65', 88') | 5–1 | 1967 South American Championship | |
| 42 | Rodolfo Fischer | 18 June 1972 | CONCACAF | Estádio Rei Pelé, Maceió, Brazil | 4 – (26', 68', 81', 86') | 7–0 | Brazil Independence Cup | |
| 43 | Carlos Bianchi | 22 June 1972 | Colombia | Estádio Fonte Nova, Salvador, Brazil | 3 – (17', 49', 62') | 4–1 | Brazil Independence Cup | |
| 44 | Leopoldo Luque | 3 August 1975 | Venezuela | Olympic Stadium, Caracas, Venezuela | 3 – (12', 34', 66') | 5–1 | 1975 Copa América | |
| 45 | Daniel Killer | 10 August 1975 | Venezuela | Estadio Gigante de Arroyito, Rosario, Argentina | 3 – (8', 41', 62') | 11–0 | 1975 Copa América | |
| 46 | Héctor Scotta | 25 February 1976 | Paraguay | Estadio Defensores del Chaco, Asunción, Paraguay | 3 – (11', 38', 52') | 3–2 | 1976 Taça do Atlântico | |
| 47 | Daniel Bertoni | 27 February 1977 | Hungary | Buenos Aires, Argentina | 3 | 5–1 | Friendly | |
| 48 | Diego Maradona | 21 May 1980 | Austria | Praterstadion, Vienna, Austria | 3 – (15', 75', 89') | 5–1 | Friendly | |
| 49 | Sergio Almirón | 4 May 1986 | Israel | The National Stadium, Ramat Gan, Israel | 3 – (5', 57', 62') | 7–2 | Friendly | |
| 50 | Gabriel Batistuta | 21 June 1994 | Greece | Foxboro Stadium, Foxborough, United States | 3 – (1', 44', 89' pen.) | 4–0 | 1994 FIFA World Cup | |
| 51 | Hernán Crespo | 24 February 1998 | FR Yugoslavia | Estadio José María Minella, Mar del Plata, Argentina | 3 – (45' pen., 85', 89') | 3–1 | Friendly | |
| 52 | Gabriel Batistuta (2) | 14 May 1998 | Bosnia and Herzegovina | Estadio Córdoba, Córdoba, Argentina | 3 – (6', 24', 80') | 4–0 | Friendly | |
| 53 | Gabriel Batistuta (3) | 21 June 1998 | Jamaica | Parc des Princes, Paris, France | 3 – (73', 79', 88' pen.) | 5–0 | 1998 FIFA World Cup | |
| 54 | Javier Saviola | 7 July 2004 | Ecuador | Estadio Elías Aguirre, Chiclayo, Peru | 3 – (64', 74', 79') | 6–1 | 2004 Copa América | |
| 55 | Luciano Figueroa | 18 June 2005 | Australia | Frankenstadion, Nuremberg, Germany | 3 – (12', 53' pen., 89' pen.) | 4–2 | 2005 FIFA Confederations Cup | |
| 56 | Gonzalo Higuaín | 17 June 2010 | South Korea | Soccer City, Johannesburg, South Africa | 3 – (33', 76', 80') | 4–1 | 2010 FIFA World Cup | |
| 57 | Gonzalo Higuaín (2) | 7 October 2011 | Chile | Estadio Monumental, Buenos Aires, Argentina | 3 – (7', 52', 63') | 4–1 | 2014 FIFA World Cup qualification | |
| 58 | Lionel Messi | 29 February 2012 | Switzerland | Stade de Suisse, Bern, Switzerland | 3 – (20', 88', 90+3' pen.) | 3–1 | Friendly | |
| 59 | Lionel Messi (2) | 9 June 2012 | Brazil | MetLife Stadium, New York City, United States | 3 – (31', 34', 85') | 4–3 | Friendly | |
| 60 | Lionel Messi (3) | 14 June 2013 | Guatemala | Estadio Nacional Mateo Flores, Guatemala City, Guatemala | 3 – (14', 40' pen., 49') | 4–0 | Friendly | |
| 61 | Sergio Agüero | 6 June 2015 | Bolivia | Estadio San Juan del Bicentenario, San Juan, Argentina | 3 – (29' pen., 31', 51') | 5–0 | Friendly | |
| 62 | Lionel Messi (4) | 10 June 2016 | Panama | Soldier Field, Chicago, United States | 3 – (68', 78', 87') | 5–0 | Copa América Centenario | |
| 63 | Lionel Messi (5) | 10 October 2017 | Ecuador | Atahualpa Olympic Stadium, Quito, Ecuador | 3 – (12', 20', 62') | 3–1 | 2018 FIFA World Cup qualification | |
| 64 | Lionel Messi (6) | 29 May 2018 | Haiti | La Bombonera, Buenos Aires, Argentina | 3 – (17' pen., 58', 66') | 4–0 | Friendly | |
| 65 | Lautaro Martínez | 10 September 2019 | Mexico | Alamodome, San Antonio, United States | 3 – (17', 22', 39') | 4–0 | Friendly | |
| 66 | Lionel Messi (7) | 9 September 2021 | Bolivia | Estadio Monumental, Buenos Aires, Argentina | 3 – (14', 64', 88') | 3–0 | 2022 FIFA World Cup qualification | |
| 67 | Lionel Messi (8) | 5 June 2022 | Estonia | El Sadar Stadium, Pamplona, Spain | 5 – (8' pen., 45', 47', 71', 76') | 5–0 | Friendly | |
| 68 | Lionel Messi (9) | 28 March 2023 | Curaçao | Estadio Único Madre de Ciudades, Santiago del Estero, Argentina | 3 – (20', 33', 37') | 7–0 | Friendly | |
| 69 | Lionel Messi (10) | 15 October 2024 | Bolivia | Estadio Monumental, Buenos Aires, Argentina | 3 – (19', 84', 86') | 6–0 | 2026 FIFA World Cup qualification | |
| 70 | Lionel Messi (11) | 16 June 2026 | Algeria | Arrowhead Stadium, Kansas City, United States | 3 – (17', 60', 76') | 3–0 | 2026 FIFA World Cup | |

== Hat-tricks conceded by Argentina ==
| No. | Player | Date | Opponent | Venue | Goals | Result | Competition | Ref. |
|---|---|---|---|---|---|---|---|---|
| 1 | Rivaldo | 7 September 1999 | Brazil | Estádio Beira-Rio, Porto Alegre, Brazil | 3 – (40', 42', 70') | 2–4 | Friendly | |
| 2 | Ronaldo | 2 June 2004 | Brazil | Mineirão, Belo Horizonte, Brazil | 3 – (16' pen., 67' pen., 90+6' pen.) | 1–3 | 2006 FIFA World Cup qualification | |
| 3 | Joaquín Botero | 1 April 2009 | Bolivia | Hernando Siles Stadium, La Paz, Bolivia | 3 – (33' pen., 53', 65') | 1–6 | 2010 FIFA World Cup qualification | |
| 4 | Isco | 27 March 2018 | Spain | Metropolitano Stadium, Madrid, Spain | 3 – (27', 52', 74') | 1–6 | Friendly | |
| 5 | Kylian Mbappé | 18 December 2022 | France | Lusail Stadium, Lusail, Qatar | 3 – (80' pen., 81', 118' pen.) | 3–3 (a.e.t.) (4–2 p) | 2022 FIFA World Cup | |

== See also ==
- Argentina national football team records and statistics
