= Óscar Sánchez =

Óscar Sánchez may refer to:

- Oscar Sánchez (footballer, born 1955), Guatemalan football striker
- Óscar Sánchez (wrestler) (born 1967), Spanish Olympic wrestler
- Óscar Sánchez (footballer, born 1971), Bolivian football sweeper
- Óscar Sánchez (footballer, born 1979), Spanish football leftback
- Óscar Eduardo Sánchez (born 1985), Colombian cyclist
- Óscar Sánchez (footballer, born 1989), Mexican football midfielder
- Oscar Sánchez (Chilean footballer)
- Oz Sanchez, American Paralympic handcyclist and triathlete

== See also ==
- Oscar Flores Sánchez (1907–1986), Mexican politician
- Óscar Gómez Sánchez (1934–2008), Peruvian footballer
