= David Ruiz =

David Ruiz may refer to:

- David A. Ruiz (born 1973), American judge
- David Resendez Ruíz, American plaintiff in Ruiz v. Estelle
- David Ruíz (footballer, born 1912) (1912–1994), Chilean football forward
- David Ruiz (screenwriter) (born 1976), Mexican screenwriter
- David Ruiz (footballer, born 2004), Honduran football midfielder
