= Lobatón =

Lobatón is a surname. Notable people with the surname include:

- Abel Lobatón Vesgas (born 1957), Peruvian footballer
- Abel Lobatón (born 1977), Peruvian football striker
- Carlos Lobatón (born 1980), Peruvian football midfielder
- Hugo Lobatón (1941–2015), Peruvian footballer
- José Lobatón (born 1984), Venezuelan baseball catcher
- Máximo Lobatón (1914–?), Peruvian footballer and manager
- Paco Lobatón (born 1951), Spanish journalist
- Víctor Lobatón (1943–1990), Peruvian footballer and manager
