= Joaquín Muñoz =

Joaquín Muñoz may refer to:

- Joaquín Muñoz Hurtado (died 1922), Chilean naval officer
- Joaquín Muñoz Peirats (1931–1987), Spanish politician
- Quino Muñoz (born 1975), Spanish tennis player
- Joaquín Muñoz (footballer, born 1992), Chilean footballer
- Joaquín Muñoz (footballer, born 1999), Spanish footballer

== See also ==
- Estadio Municipal Joaquín Muñoz García, a sports stadium in Santa Cruz, Chile
