= Héctor Trejo =

Chilean footballer (1919-1992)

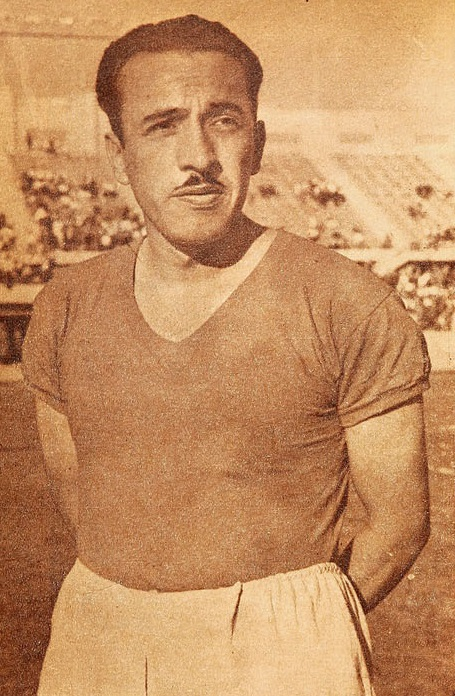

Personal information
- Full name: Héctor Jovino Trejo Hernández
- Date of birth: 15 July 1919
- Date of death: 15 April 1992 (aged 72)

International career
Years	Team	Apps	(Gls)
1941	Chile	3	(0)

Héctor Trejo (15 July 1919 – 15 April 1992) was a Chilean footballer. He played in three matches for the Chile national football team in 1941. He was also part of Chile's squad for the 1941 South American Championship.
