= Sabino Coletta =

Argentine footballer

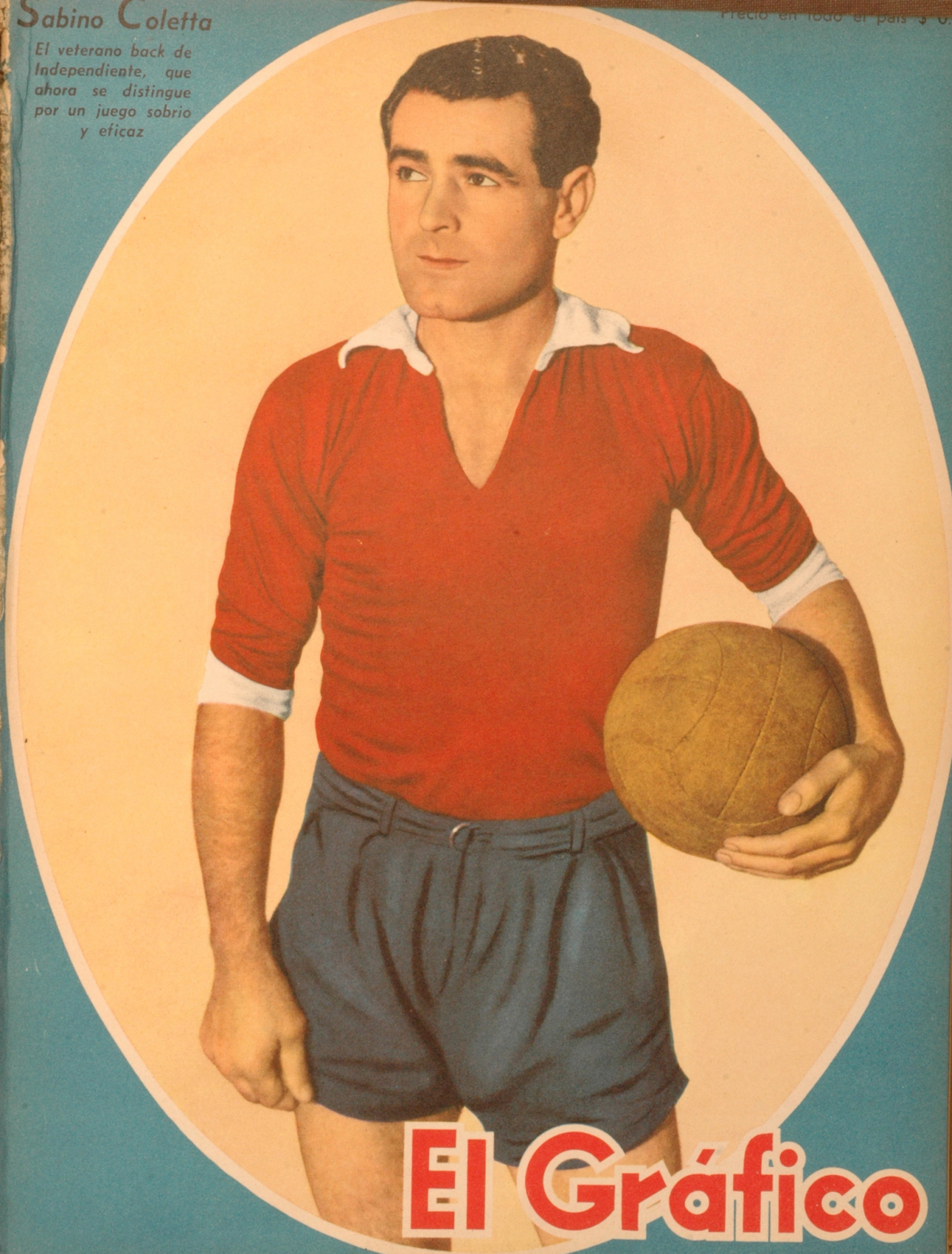

Personal information
- Date of birth: 12 May 1914
- Position: Defender

International career
Years	Team	Apps	(Gls)
1936–1941	Argentina	7	(0)

Sabino Coletta (born 12 May 1914, date of death unknown) was an Argentine footballer. He played in seven matches for the Argentina national football team from 1936 to 1941. He was also part of Argentina's squad for the 1941 South American Championship.
