= Manuel Pichulman =

Chilean footballer (born 1952)

Personal information
- Full name: Manuel Caupolicán Pichulman Plaza
- Date of birth: 14 September 1952 (age 74)
- Place of birth: Santiago, Chile
- Position: Forward

Senior career*
Years	Team	Apps	(Gls)
- Colo-Colo
1972–1973	Magallanes		
1974–1975	Everton		
1976–1977	Audax Italiano		
1978–1979	Royal Crossing Schaerbeek		
- Santiago Morning
- Iberia
- * Club domestic league appearances and goals

Manuel Caupolicán Pichulman Plaza (born 14 September 1952), is a Chilean former professional footballer. He played forward for clubs in Chile, Belgium, and Central America.

== Career ==
In Chile Pichulman played for Colo-Colo, Magallanes, Audax Italiano, Everton, Santiago Morning, and Iberia; he is most known for his stint at Magallanes. He was a member of Audax Italiano in 1976, when they were promoted to the Chilean Primera División. He made 18 appearances and scored 9 goals in the 1977 season.

In 1978, he emigrated to Europe and joined Royal Crossing Schaerbeek in the Belgian second level for the 1978–79 season. He also played in Central America.

== After football ==
Pichulman started an eponymous football academy (Escuela de Fútbol Manuel Pichulman) near Cuncumén, San Antonio.

== Personal life ==
Pichulman is of Mapuche descent, his "Pichulman" means "condor feather" in Mapudungun.
