= Osvaldo Carvajal =

Chilean footballer (1914–1991)

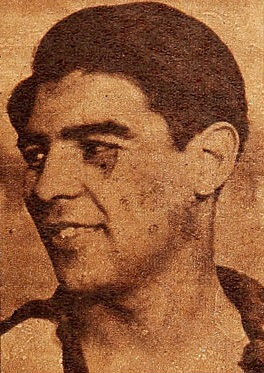

Personal information
- Date of birth: 15 November 1914
- Date of death: 11 July 1991 (aged 76)
- Position: Midfielder

International career
Years	Team	Apps	(Gls)
1941	Chile	4	(0)

Osvaldo Carvajal (15 November 1914 – 11 July 1991) was a Chilean footballer. He played in four matches for the Chile national football team in 1941. He was also part of Chile's squad for the 1941 South American Championship.
