= Juan Parodi =

Argentine football manager

Juan Parodi was an Argentine football coach who coached the Ecuador national team at the 1941 and 1942 South American Championships. The team lost all ten matches that they played under his leadership.
