= José Batagliero =

Argentine footballer (1916–1976)

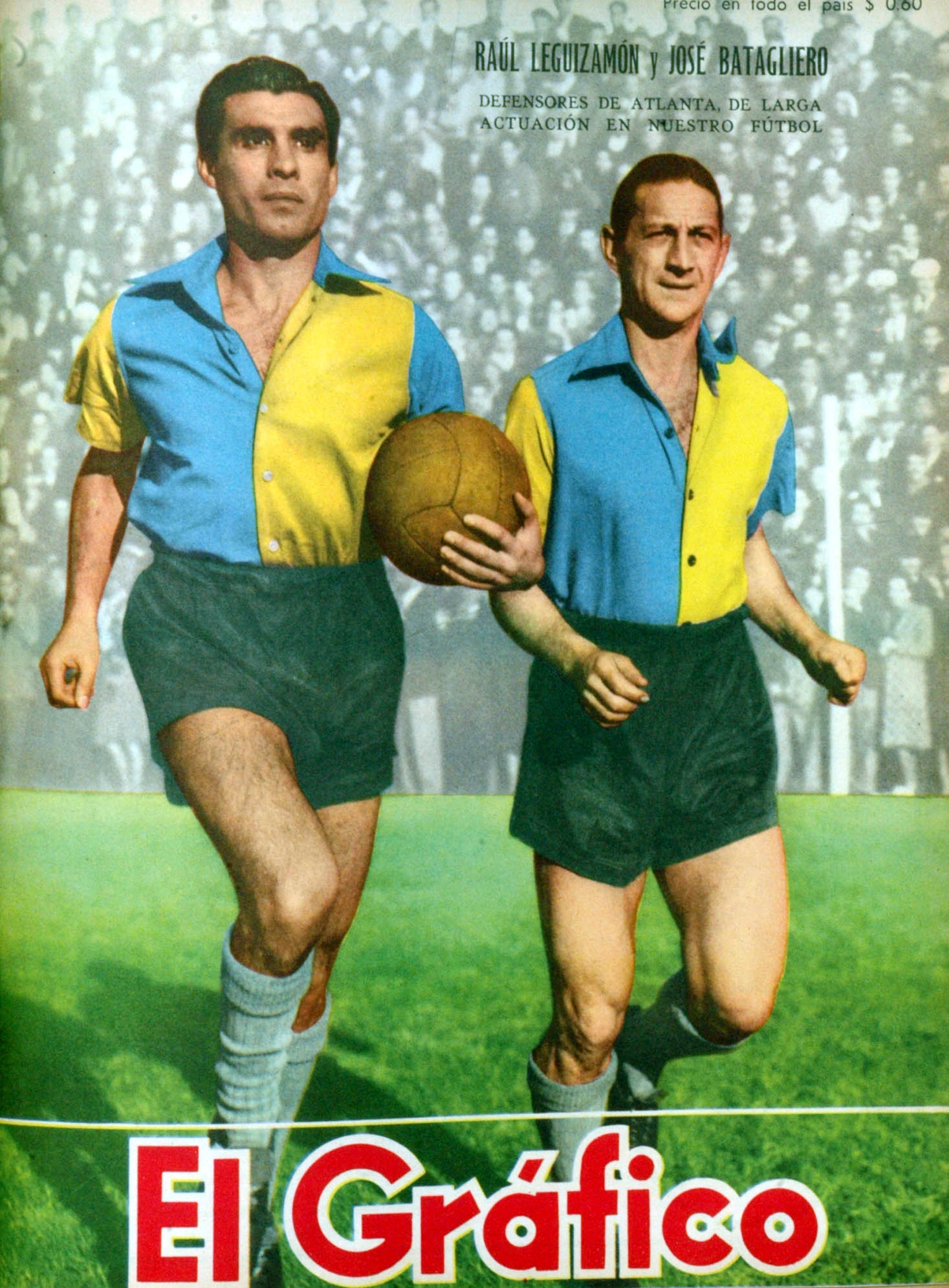

Personal information
- Date of birth: 1 January 1916
- Date of death: 11 March 1976 (aged 60)
- Position: Defender

International career
Years	Team	Apps	(Gls)
1940–1945	Argentina	10	(0)

José Batagliero (1 January 1916 – 11 March 1976) was an Argentine footballer. He played in ten matches for the Argentina national football team from 1940 to 1945. He was also part of Argentina's squad for the 1941 South American Championship.
