= Roberto Cabrera =

Chilean footballer (1914-1995)

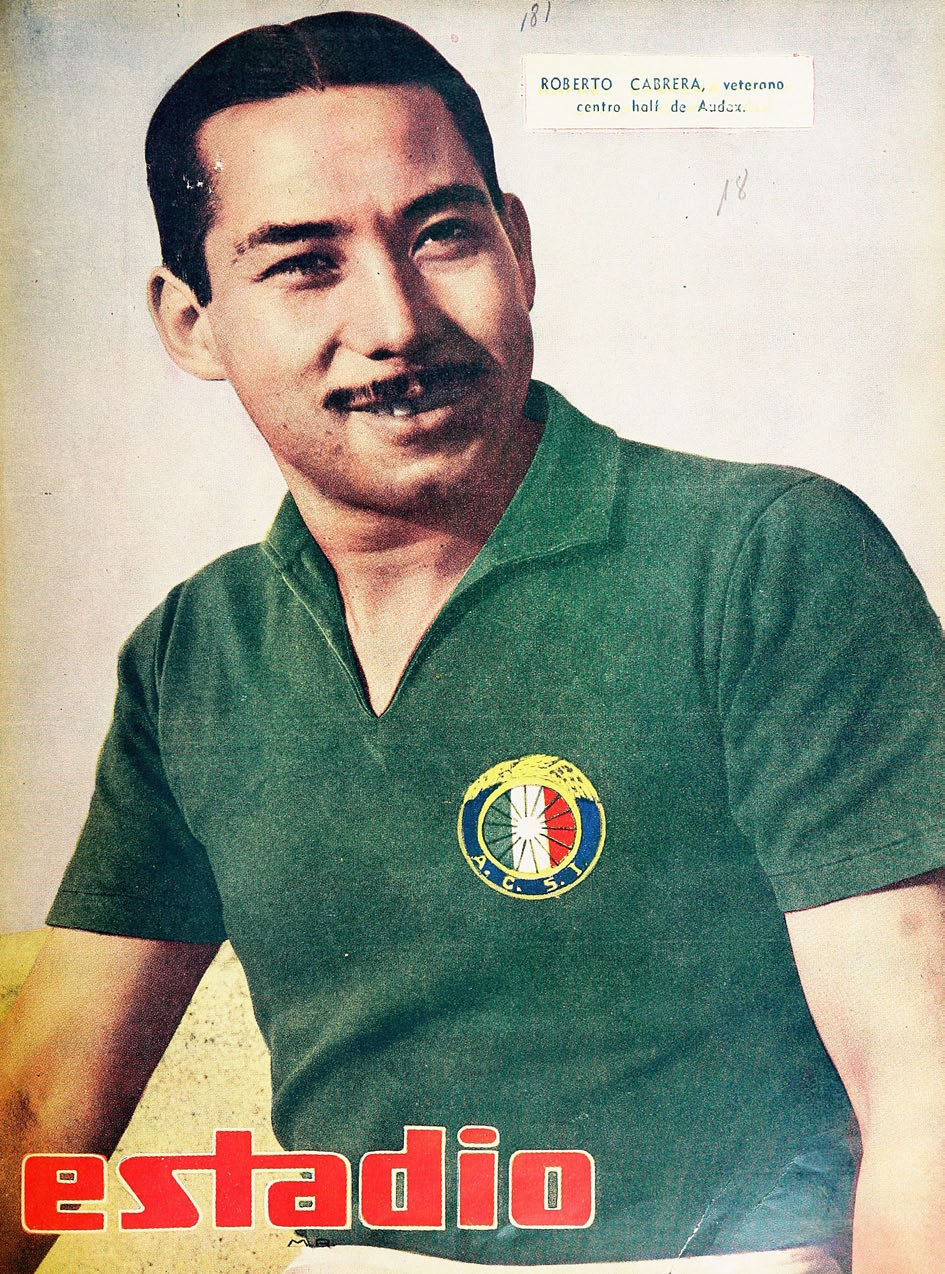

Personal information
- Date of birth: 2 January 1914
- Date of death: 7 October 1995 (aged 81)
- Position: Defender

International career
Years	Team	Apps	(Gls)
1941–1942	Chile	8	(0)

Roberto Cabrera (2 January 1914 – 7 October 1995) was a Chilean footballer. He played in eight matches for the Chile national football team from 1941 to 1942. He was also part of Chile's squad for the 1941 South American Championship.
