= Segundo Flores =

Chilean footballer (1906-1971)

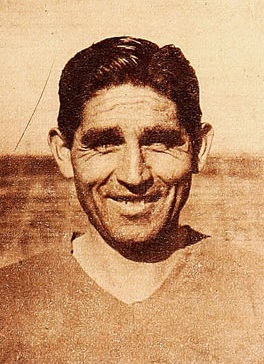

Personal information
- Date of birth: 6 March 1906
- Date of death: 22 February 1971 (aged 64)
- Position: Defender

International career
Years	Team	Apps	(Gls)
1941	Chile	3	(0)

Segundo Flores (6 March 1906 – 22 February 1971) was a Chilean footballer. He played in three matches for the Chile national football team in 1941. He was also part of Chile's squad for the 1941 South American Championship.
