= Waldemar Méndez =

Argentine-Chilean footballer (born 1971)

Personal information
- Full name: Enrique Waldemar Méndez Martijena
- Date of birth: 12 January 1971 (age 55)
- Place of birth: Laprida, Buenos Aires, Argentina
- Height: 1.79 m (5 ft 10 1/2 in)
- Position: Goalkeeper

Youth career
- 1986–1990: Ferro Carril Oeste

Senior career*
Years	Team	Apps	(Gls)
1990–1994	Ferro Carril Oeste	0	(0)
1994	Unión La Calera		
1995	Deportes Ovalle		
1996–1999	Deportes La Serena		
2000	Deportes Melipilla		
2001	Unión La Calera		
2002	Deportes Temuco	7	(0)
2003	O'Higgins		
2004	Provincial Osorno	2	(0)
2005	Unión La Calera		

Managerial career
- 2006: Magallanes (interim)
- * Club domestic league appearances and goals

Enrique Waldemar Méndez Martijena (born 20 May 1971), known as Waldemar Méndez, is an Argentine naturalized Chilean footballer who played for clubs of Argentina and Chile.

== Career ==
A product of Ferro Carril Oeste, he moved to Chile and played in both the Primera B and the Primera División for clubs such as Unión La Calera, Deportes Ovalle, Deportes La Serena, among others. Along with Deportes La Serena, he won the 1996 Primera B, getting promotion to the Primera División.

Following his retirement, he graduated as a football manager. In 2006, he assumed as interim coach of Magallanes in the Primera B de Chile.

== Personal life ==
He naturalized Chilean by residence and Spanish by descent.

On 29 February 2020, he married María Gracia Subercaseaux, a Chilean photographer and media personality.

He worked as a in-match analyst for Canal del Futbol, commonly known as "CDF", a cable soccer channel that holds the exclusive TV rights to all the matches of the first and second division of the Chilean professional league. Then he joined ESPN Chile for the program ESPN F90 (before ESPN Radio). He also works for Radio Futuro in the program Futuro Fútbol Club.

== Honours ==
Deportes La Serena

- Primera B (1): 1996
