= Oscar Ellis =

Chilean footballer (1909-1987)

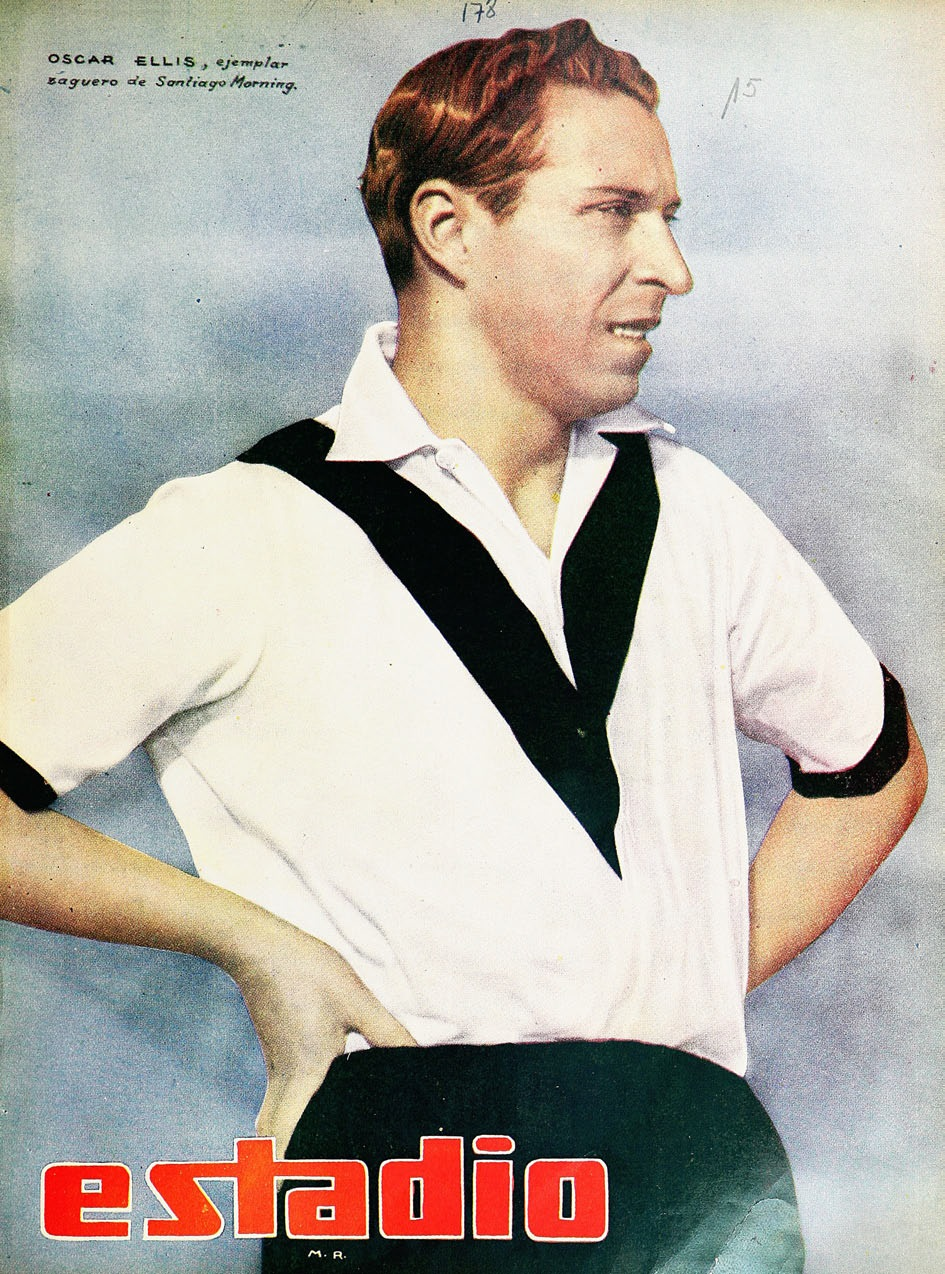

Personal information
- Date of birth: 3 May 1909
- Date of death: 1 April 1987 (aged 77)
- Position: Defender

International career
Years	Team	Apps	(Gls)
1941	Chile	1	(0)

Oscar Ellis (3 May 1909 – 1 April 1987) was a Chilean footballer. He played in one match for the Chile national football team in 1941. He was also part of Chile's squad for the 1941 South American Championship.
