= José Pastenes =

Chilean footballer (1915-1993)

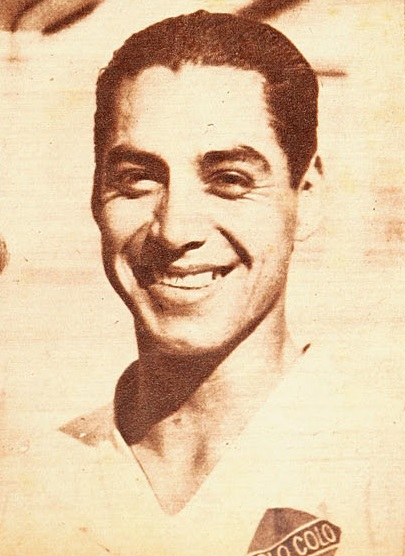

Personal information
- Full name: José Félix Pastenes Salinas
- Date of birth: 10 July 1915
- Date of death: 16 July 1993 (aged 78)
- Position: Midfielder

International career
Years	Team	Apps	(Gls)
1941–1945	Chile	14	(0)

José Pastenes (10 July 1915 – 16 July 1993) was a Chilean footballer. He played in 14 matches for the Chile national football team from 1941 to 1945. He was also part of Chile's squad for the 1941 South American Championship.
