= Santiago Coronel =

Argentine footballer

Personal information
- Full name: Santiago Agustín Coronel
- Date of birth: 12 July 2000 (age 26)
- Place of birth: Ituzaingó, Argentina
- Height: 1.70 m (5 ft 7 in)
- Position: Midfielder

Team information
- Current team: Magallanes
- Number: 12

Youth career
- 2014–2021: Vélez Sarsfield

Senior career*
Years	Team	Apps	(Gls)
2021–2026	Vélez Sarsfield	0	(0)
2021–2022	→ Musou Argentina (loan)	–	(–)
2022–2023	→ Deportivo Morón (loan)	57	(7)
2024	→ Barracas Central (loan)	19	(0)
2025	→ Atlanta (loan)	31	(1)
2026–	Magallanes	1	(0)
- * Club domestic league appearances and goals as of 24 February 2026

Santiago Agustín Coronel (born 12 July 2000) is an Argentine professional footballer who plays as a midfielder for Chilean club Magallanes.

== Career ==
A product of Vélez Sarsfield, Coronel signed his first professional contract in November 2021. After playing for Musou FC in the 2021–22 Torneo Regional Federal Amateur, he was loaned out to Deportivo Morón in the Primera B Nacional.

In 2024, Coronel played on loan for Barracas Central in the Argentiune top level and switched to Atlanta the next season.

In February 2026, Coronel ended his contract with Vélez Sarsfield and moved abroad to play for Chilean club Magallanes.
