= Oscar Sánchez (Chilean footballer) =

Chilean footballer (1910-1974)

Óscar Sánchez
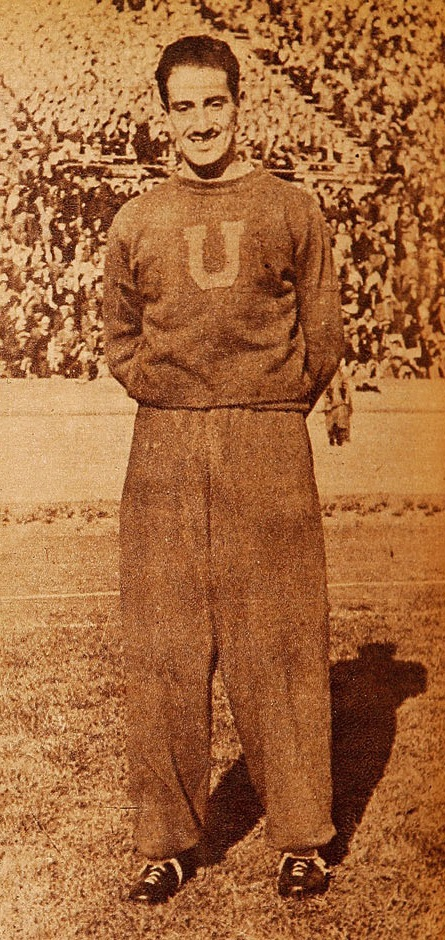

Personal information
- Full name: Óscar Armando Sánchez Labra
- Date of birth: 2 April 1910
- Place of birth: Cauquenes, Chile
- Date of death: 22 March 1974 (aged 63)
- Place of death: Chillán, Chile
- Position: Midfielder

Youth career
- 1927: Liceo de Cauquenes

Senior career*
Years	Team	Apps	(Gls)
1927–1931	Independiente Cauquenes		
1931–1933	Badminton		
1933	Morning Star		
1934	Sportiva Italiana		
1934–1937	Unión Española		
1938–1941	Universidad de Chile		
1948	Rangers		

International career
1941	Chile	2	(0)
- * Club domestic league appearances and goals

Óscar Armando Sánchez Labra (2 April 1910 – 22 March 1974) was a Chilean footballer. He played in two matches for the Chile national football team in 1941. He was also part of Chile's squad for the 1941 South American Championship.

== Career ==
Born in Cauquenes, Chile, Sánchez represented the team of Liceo de Cauquenes, aged 17. Alongside another students, he founded and played for Independiente de Cauquenes. He also represented the city teams of both Talca and Cauquenes. In 1931, he moved to Santiago and joined Badminton.

Since the professional era of the Chilean football, Sánchez played for Morning Star, the previous club to Santiago Morning, Sportiva Italiana, Unión Española and Universidad de Chile, at league level. He also reinforced Colo-Colo, Magallanes and Audax Italiano for international matches. He retired in 1941.

In 1940, Sánchez and his fellow Domingo Sepúlveda tried to constitute the first trade union of professional footballers in Chile, receiving a suspension for 2 years what later was revoked.

After his retirement, Sánchez played for Rangers de Talca in 1948 at city level.
