= Juan Muñoz (footballer, born 1912) =

Chilean footballer

Personal information
- Full name: Juan Juvencio Muñoz Castañeda
- Date of birth: 8 February 1912
- Date of death: 2 January 1977 (aged 64)
- Position: Forward

International career
Years	Team	Apps	(Gls)
1941	Chile	1	(0)

Juan Muñoz (8 February 1912 – 2 January 1977) was a Chilean footballer. He played in one match for the Chile national football team in 1941. He was also part of Chile's squad for the 1941 South American Championship.
