= Máximo Lobatón =

Peruvian footballer and manager (born 1914)

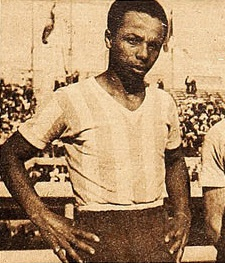
- Máximo Lobaton in 1941

Personal information
- Date of birth: 13 August 1914
- Place of birth: Chincha Alta, Peru
- Date of death: ?
- Position: Midfielder

Youth career
- Alianza Lima

Senior career*
Years	Team	Apps	(Gls)
1937–1938	Deportivo Municipal		
1939–1940	Deportes Magallanes		
1941	Alianza Lima		
1942	Huracán	10	(0)
1943–1947	Alianza Lima		
1948–1952	Deportivo Cali		

International career
1941–1942	Peru	12	(0)

Managerial career
- 1944: Sport Boys
- 1955: Deportivo Cali
- 1959–1961: Cúcuta Deportivo
- 1966: Alfonso Ugarte de Chiclín
- * Club domestic league appearances and goals

Máximo Lobatón (13 August 1914 – unknown) was a Peruvian manager and former player.

== Playing career ==
=== Club career ===
Trained at Alianza Lima, Lobatón nevertheless began his career at Deportivo Municipal in 1937. He first moved abroad in 1939 to Deportes Magallanes (Chile), before returning to Peru to play for his boyhood club, Alianza Lima, in 1941. He moved abroad a second time, signing with Huracán (Argentina), where he played 10 matches in 1942. He was, in fact, the first Peruvian player to play for Huracán.

He returned to Peru and played for Alianza from 1943 to 1947 before moving abroad a third and final time to Colombia in 1948, where he joined Deportivo Cali along with the exodus of Peruvian footballers to ‘El Dorado’.

=== International career ===
Lobatón was a Peruvian international 12 times between 1941 and 1942. He participated in the South American Championships of 1941 (4 matches) and 1942 (5 matches).

== Managerial career ==
Máximo Lobatón coached Sport Boys in 1944. He also managed Deportivo Cali (on an interim basis) and Cúcuta Deportivo in Colombia. In 1966, he took over as manager of Alfonso Ugarte de Chiclín.

== Honours ==
=== Player ===
Deportivo Municipal

- Peruvian Primera División: 1938
