= David Ruíz (footballer, born 1912) =

Chilean footballer (1912-1994)

Personal information
- Full name: José David Ruíz
- Date of birth: 23 July 1912
- Date of death: 11 January 1994 (aged 81)
- Position: Forward

International career
Years	Team	Apps	(Gls)
1941	Chile	2	(0)

David Ruíz (23 July 1912 – 11 January 1994) was a Chilean footballer. He played in two matches for the Chile national football team in 1941. He was also part of Chile's squad for the 1941 South American Championship.
