= Joaquín Muñoz (footballer, born 1992) =

Chilean footballer

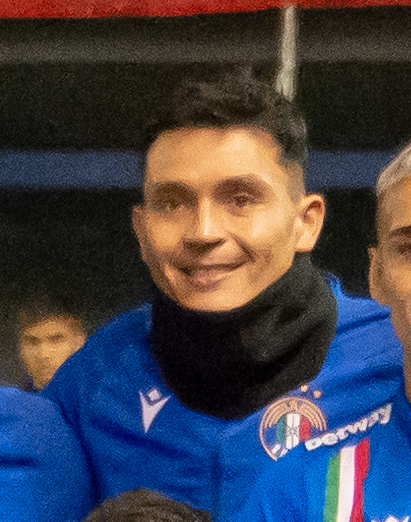
- Muñoz with Audax Italiano in 2023

Personal information
- Full name: Joaquín Emanuel Muñoz Esparza
- Date of birth: 17 August 1992 (age 34)
- Place of birth: Quinta Normal, Santiago, Chile
- Height: 1.81 m (5 ft 11 1/2 in)
- Position: Goalkeeper

Team information
- Current team: Magallanes
- Number: 1

Youth career
- Audax Italiano

Senior career*
Years	Team	Apps	(Gls)
2010–2023	Audax Italiano	109	(0)
2010–2011	→ Municipal La Pintana (loan)	24	(0)
2012–2014	Audax Italiano B	32	(0)
2024–2025	Deportes Concepción	17	(0)
2026–	Magallanes	0	(0)
- * Club domestic league appearances and goals as of 24 December 2025

Joaquín Emanuel Muñoz Esparza (born 17 August 1992) is a Chilean footballer who plays as a goalkeeper for Magallanes.

== Career ==
After spending almost all his career with Audax Italiano, with a stint on loan to Municipal La Pintana in 2010–11, he ended his contract with them in December 2023.

In 2024, Muñoz joined Deportes Concepción in the Segunda División Profesional de Chile. He left them at the end of 2025.

On 7 January 2026, Muñoz joined Magallanes.

== Honours ==
Deportes Concepción

- Segunda División Profesional de Chile: 2024
