= Máximo Garay =

Hungarian Naturalised Chilean Football Manager

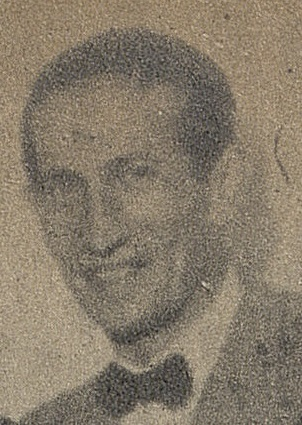

Personal information
- Full name: Máximo Garay S.
- Date of birth: 10 June 1898
- Place of birth: Budapest, Austria-Hungary
- Date of death: 8 August 1960 (aged 62)
- Place of death: Santiago, Chile
- Height: 1.78 m (5 ft 10 in)

Managerial career
- Years: Team
- 1934–1935: Platense
- 1936: Independiente
- 1937: Gimnasia LP
- 1938: San Lorenzo
- 1938: Universidad Católica
- 1940: Colo-Colo
- 1940–1941: El Salvador
- 1941: Chile
- 1941: Magallanes
- 1942: Badminton
- 1945–1946: Badminton

Máximo Garay S. (Hungarian: Garay Miksa, 10 June 1898 – 8 August 1960) was a Hungarian naturalized Chilean football manager.

== Career ==
Born Miska Garay Magnuzs in Hungary, he naturalized Chilean. He worked for clubs in Argentina and Chile. In addition, he was the manager of both El Salvador and Chile national teams. In 1940, he was the manager of Colo-Colo.
