= Oscar Chirimini =

Uruguayan footballer (1917–1961)

Personal information
- Date of birth: 28 March 1917
- Date of death: 3 April 1961 (aged 44)
- Position: Forward

International career
Years	Team	Apps	(Gls)
1937–1944	Uruguay	21	(4)
Medal record
Men's football
Representing Uruguay
South American Championship
Winner	1942 Uruguay
Runner-up	1939 Peru
Runner-up	1941 Chile
Third place	1937 Argentina

Oscar Chirimini (28 March 1917 – 3 April 1961) was a Uruguayan footballer. He played 21 matches for the Uruguay national football team from 1937 to 1944. He was also part of Uruguay's squad at 1941 South American Championship.
