= Raúl Pérez (Chilean footballer) =

Chilean footballer (1915-1967)

Personal information
- Full name: Raúl Enrique Pérez Vergara
- Date of birth: 21 June 1915
- Date of death: 26 July 1967 (aged 52)
- Position: Forward

International career
| Years | Team | Apps | (Gls) |
| 1941–1942 | Chile | 4 | (1) |

Raúl Pérez (21 June 1915 – 26 July 1967) was a Chilean footballer. He played in four matches for the Chile national football team from 1941 to 1942. He was also part of Chile's squad for the 1941 South American Championship.
