= Juan Marvezzi =

Argentine footballer

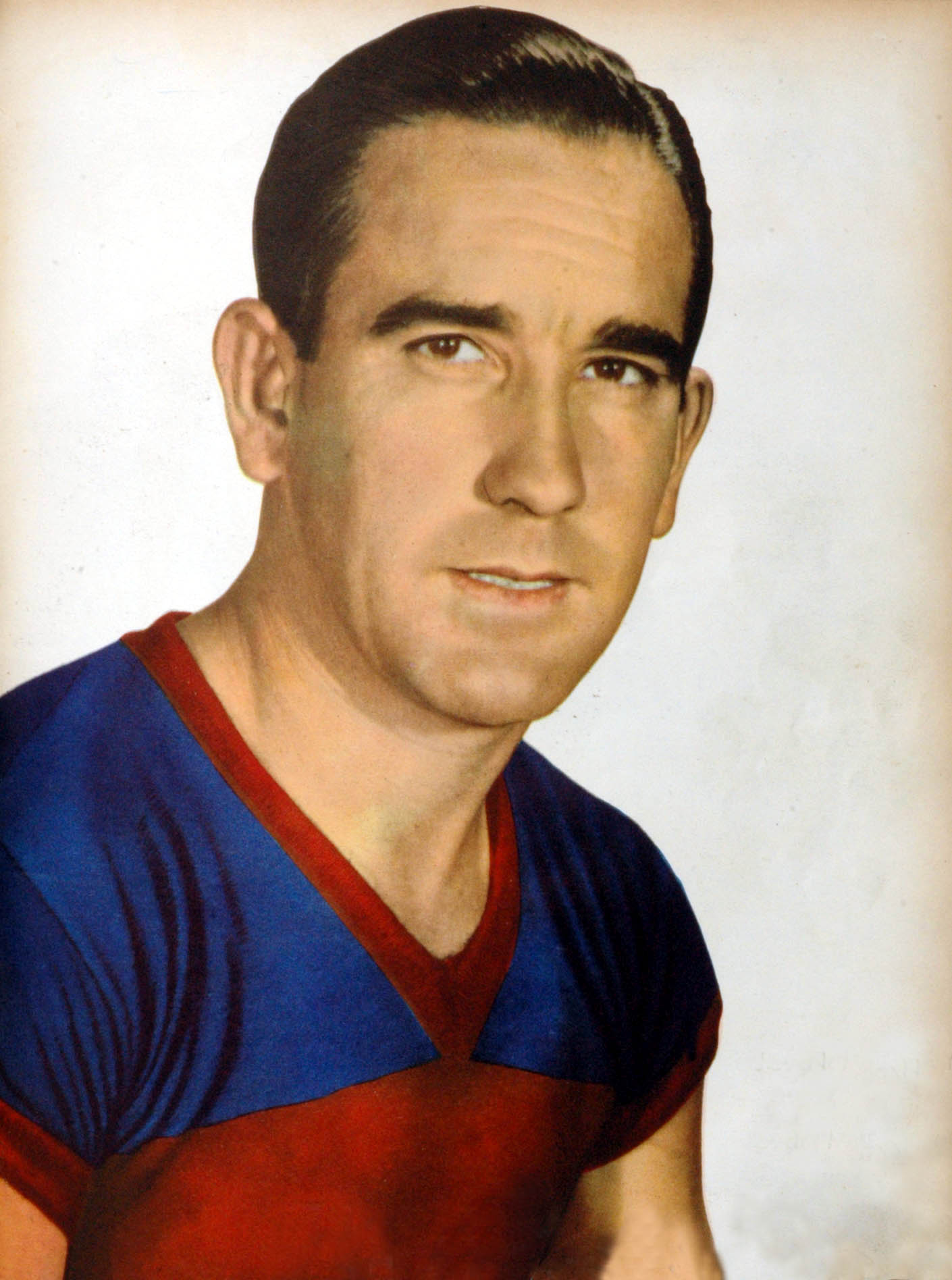
- Marvezzi at Tigre in 1941

Personal information
- Full name: Juan Andrés Marvezzi
- Date of birth: 16 November 1915
- Place of birth: San Miguel de Tucumán, Argentina
- Date of death: 4 April 1971 (aged 55)
- Place of death: Munro, Argentina
- Position: Striker

Senior career*
Years	Team	Apps	(Gls)
- Argentino de Rosario
- Bella Vista de Tucumán
1937–1942	Tigre	173	(116)
1942	Racing Club		
1943	Tigre	(see above)	

International career
1937–1941	Argentina	9	(9)
- * Club domestic league appearances and goals as of March 2008

Juan Andrés Marvezzi (16 November 1915 - 4 April 1971) was an Argentine football striker, he played for Argentina was the top scorer in the Copa América 1941. He holds the record as Club Atlético Tigre's all-time top scorer, with 116 goals.

== Club career ==
Marvezzi spent his early years with Argentino de Rosario and Bella Vista de Tucumán before joining Tigre in 1937, he played for the club until 1942 when he had a brief spell at Racing Club de Avellaneda before returning to Tigre in 1943.

== International career ==
Marvezzi played for Argentina in the Copa América 1941, eventually finishing as the tournament top scorer, he scored five goals in a single game against Ecuador

== Titles ==
Season	Team	Title
1941	Argentina	Copa América
