= Deportes Magallanes =

Chilean football club

Magallanes
- Full name: Club Deportivo Magallanes
- Nicknames: Albicelestes; Carabeleros; Manojito de Claveles; Academia; El Viejo y Querido; El Primer Grande
- Founded: October 27, 1897; 129 years ago
- Ground: Estadio Municipal de San Bernardo, San Bernardo, Santiago
- Capacity: 3,500
- Chairman: Pablo Vera
- Manager: Braulio Leal
- League: Primera B
- 2025: Primera B, 10th of 16
Home colours	Away colours

Magallanes is a Chilean football club based in San Bernardo, Chile. They play in the Primera B de Chile, after being relegated from the Chilean Primera División in 2023.

== History ==
The club was on October 27, 1897, with the name Atlético Escuela Normal F.C. In 1933 they became the first national champions of Chile.

They won a hat trick of titles in the formative years of Chilean football (1933, 1934 and 1935) but their last major title came in 1938.

In 2022 they won the Primera B championship and promotion to the top tier having not competed since 1986, they also won the Copa Chile for the first time in the same year which meant they qualified for the 2023 Copa Libertadores.

Magallanes, adopting their official name in 1904, is one of the oldest clubs in the country. Since the year 2000, after accepting the regulations of the Chilean law 20019, the team has been managed by a limited sports company.

It is one of the eight founding clubs of the Nation Chilean Football League, the first football league established in the country, which also instituted the Premier Division (Primera Division) of Chile.

In this league, Magallanes won their first championship in 1933. In addition, they were the first club to win three consecutive professional championships in Chile.

== Colours ==
The club adopted white and sky blue as their official colors in 1908. These colors are used in their sportswear as well as their logo, which depicts a Caravel on the ocean.

== Stadium ==
Since August 2015, Magallanes has practiced in their hometown of San Bernardo in the city stadium, which seats 3,500 spectators.

== Rivalries ==
They often compete in the Metropolitan Classic against their longtime rival, Santiago Morning. In addition, they have a rivalry against Colo-Colo, dubbed "Clásico de la Chilenidad".

== Honours ==
Magallanes is ranked sixth for national titles in the Premier Division, tying Everton de Viña del Mar and Audax Italiano, with four each.

They have been the runner up behind Colo-Colo, Universidad de Chile, Universidad Católica, Cobreloa and Unión Española. They also have one title from the Third Division (Tercera Division), one title from the Campeonato de Apertura, one from the Campeonato Relámpago and one from the Campeonato Absoluto.

Despite their lack of titles in the last 70 years the club are still ranked as the seventh most successful team in the history of Chilean football.

=== National ===
- Primera División
  - Winners (4): 1933, 1934, 1935, 1938
- Copa Chile
  - Winners (1): 2022
- Supercopa de Chile
  - Winners (1): 2023
- Campeonato de Apertura
  - Winners (1): 1937
- Primera B
  - Winners (1): 2022
- Tercera División A
  - Winners (2): 1995, 2010

=== Regional ===
- Copa Municipal de Santiago
  - Winners (1): 1908
- Copa Chile de la Asociación Arturo Prat
  - Winners (1): 1909
- Copa Unión de la Primera División de la Asociación de Football de Santiago
  - Winners (4): 1908, 1913, 1916, 1920
- Copa República de la Primera División de la Asociación de Football de Santiago
  - Winners (2): 1920, 1921
- Copa Independencia de la Segunda División de la Asociación de Football de Santiago
  - Winners (2): Serie A 1919, 1921
- Copa Miguel Blanco de la Tercera División de la Asociación de Football de Santiago
  - Winners (1): 1919
- Copa de Campeones de Santiago
  - Winners (2): 1920, 1921
- División de Honor de la Liga Metropolitana de Deportes
  - Winners (1): 1926
- Primera División de la Liga Central de Football de Santiago
  - Winners (1): Serie E 1928
- Campeonato de Apertura de la Asociación de Football de Santiago
  - Winners (1): 1931
- Copa Félix Alegría
  - Winners (1): 1920
- Copa Alberto Downe
  - Winners (1): 1920
- Copa 12 de octubre
  - Winners (1): 1920

== Performance in CONMEBOL competitions ==
- Copa Libertadores: 2 appearances

1985: First Round
2023: Third Round

== Current squad ==
Current squad of Deportes Magallanes as of 5 August 2026 (edit)
Sources: ANFP Official Web Site

No.		Position	Player
1	CHI	GK	Joaquín Muñoz
2	CHI	DF	Diego Figueroa
3	CHI	DF	Alonso Walters
4	CHI	DF	Matías Vásquez (c)
5	ARG	MF	Bruno Liuzzi
6	ARG	DF	Jeremías James
7	CHI	FW	Alessandro Toledo
8	CHI	MF	Diego Fernández
9	URU	FW	Facundo Peraza
10	CHI	MF	Cristóbal Jorquera
11	CHI	FW	Matías Fredes
12	CHI	GK	Martín Riffo
13	CHI	MF	Martín Arévalo
14	CHI	FW	Máximo Espínola
15	CHI	DF	Martín López
16	CHI	FW	Matías Osorio
17	ARG	GK	Juan Pablo Zozaya (loan from Estudiantes)

No.		Position	Player
18	CHI	DF	Elías Berríos
19	CHI	FW	Rubén Farfán
20	CHI	MF	Esteban Neira
21	CHI	MF	Javier Quiroz
22	CHI	DF	Maximilliano Bezanilla
23	ARG	FW	Milton Alegre
24	CHI	DF	Felipe Yáñez (loan from Colo-Colo)
28	CHI	MF	Gamalier Guzmán
29	CHI	MF	Matías Cofré
30	CHI	DF	Hans Salinas
32	ARG	MF	Santiago Coronel
33	CHI	MF	Víctor González
34	CHI	DF	Rocco Abruzzese
35	CHI	MF	Vicente Cabezas
36	CHI	FW	Ian Sanzana
38	CHI	GK	Benjamín Sánchez
40	ARG	FW	Ignacio Serpa

Manager: Miguel Ponce

=== 2021 Winter Transfers ===
==== In ====
Note: Flags indicate national team as defined under FIFA eligibility rules; some limited exceptions apply. Players may hold more than one non-FIFA nationality.

No. / Pos. / Nation / Player; -- / MF / USA / Andrés Souper (Loan from C.D. Antofagasta)	No. / Pos. / Nation / Player

==== Out ====
Note: Flags indicate national team as defined under FIFA eligibility rules; some limited exceptions apply. Players may hold more than one non-FIFA nationality.

No.	Pos.	Nation	Player
5	DF	PAR	Jonathan Espínola (Released)
6	MF	CHI	Gino Alucema (Released)

No.	Pos.	Nation	Player
27	FW	CHI	Luis Jiménez (Retired)

== Notable players ==
- (Chile) Manuel Pichulman
- (Australia) John Crawley

== Managers ==
- (Chile) Luis Tirado (1931)
- (Chile) Pedro Bahamondes (1933)
- (Chile) Arturo Torres (1933–1935)
- (Chile) Leoncio Veloso (1938)
- (Hungary) Máximo Garay (1941)
- (Hungary) Jorge Orth (1942–1943)
- (Hungary) Francisco Platko (1945)
- (Argentina) José Luis Boffi (1946–1947)
- (Chile) Francisco Las Heras (1948)
- (Argentina) Francisco Villegas (1956)
- (Argentina) Carlos Orlandelli (1959)
- (Chile) Sergio Cruzat (1961)
- (Chile) Hugo Cheix (1962)
- (Argentina) Martín García (1963)
- (Chile) Sergio Cruzat (1964–1966)
- (Chile) Osvaldo Caldera (1966)
- (Argentina) Donato Hernández (1967–1968)
- (Argentina) Salvador Biondi (1969)
- (Chile) Ramón Estay (1969–1972)
- (Chile) Sergio Navarro (1973)
- (Chile) Rosamel Miranda (1974–1975)
- (Argentina) Donato Hernández (1975)
- (Chile) Sergio Cruzat (1978)
- (Chile) Humberto Cruz (1978)
- (Chile) Guillermo Duarte (1979)
- (Chile) Eugenio Jara (1980–1982)
- (Chile) Jorge Venegas (1983)
- (Chile) Manuel Rodríguez Vega (1984)
- (Chile) Eugenio Jara (1985)
- (Chile) Hernán Castro (1986)
- (Chile) Jorge Venegas (1986)
- (Chile) Roberto Spicto (1986)
- (Chile) Ricardo Horta (1986)
- (Chile) Francisco Graells (1986)
- (Chile) Eugenio Jara (1988)
- (Chile) Alfonso Lara (1988)
- (Chile) Guillermo Páez (1989–1990)
- (Chile) Alfonso Lara (1991)
- (Chile) Hugo Solís (1991)
- (Chile) Carlos Valenzuela (1992)
- (Chile) Arturo Jáuregui (1992)
- (Argentina) Ricardo Dabrowski (1993)
- (Chile) Arturo Jáuregui (1993)
- (Chile) Manuel Espinoza (1995-1996)
- (Chile) Guillermo Yávar (1996)
- (Chile) Francisco Valdés (1996)
- (Chile) Luis Rojas (1997)
- (Chile) Guillermo Yávar (1997)
- (Argentina) Alfredo Funes (1998)
- (Chile) Juan Páez (1999)
- (Chile) Ronald Yávar (1999–2000)
- (Chile) Manuel Rodríguez Araneda (2000–2001)
- (Chile) Guillermo Maureira (2001)
- (Chile) Orlando Aravena (2002–2003)
- (Chile) Osvaldo Hurtado (2003–2005)
- (Chile) Horacio Rivas (2005)
- (Chile) Juan Ubilla (2006)
- (Chile) Horacio Rivas (2006)
- (Chile) Guillermo Páez (2006)
- (Argentina) José Miguel Burgos (2006)
- (Argentina) (Chile) Waldemar Méndez (2006)
- (Chile) Fernando Vergara (2007)
- (Chile) Mauricio Riffo (2008)
- (Chile) Osvaldo Hurtado (2008–2014)
- (Argentina) Claudio Úbeda (2014–2015)
- (Chile) Pedro Rivera (2015)
- (Argentina) Pablo Abraham (2015–2016)
- (Argentina) (Chile) Ariel Pereyra (2016)
- (Chile) Hugo Balladares (2017–2018)
- (Chile) Jaime Gutiérrez (2018)
- (Chile) Óscar Correa (2018–2019)
- (Chile) Patricio Ormazábal (2019)
- (Argentina) (Chile) Ariel Pereyra (2019–2020)
- (Chile) Fernando Vergara (2020–2021)
- (Chile) Nicolás Núñez (2021–2023)
- (Chile) Braulio Leal (2023)
- (Chile) Mario Salas (2023)
- (Chile) Ronald Fuentes (2024)
- (Chile) Braulio Leal (2025)
- (Chile) Iván Vásquez (2025)
- (Chile) Ivo Basay (2025)
- (Chile) Miguel Ponce (2025–Present)

== See also ==
- Chilean football league system
