= 1941 South American Championship =

Football tournament

Tournament details
- Host country: Chile
- Dates: 2 February – 4 March
- Teams: 5 (from 1 confederation)
- Venue: 1 (in 1 host city)

Final positions
- Champions: Argentina (6th title)
- Runners-up: Uruguay
- Third place: Chile
- Fourth place: Peru

Tournament statistics
- Matches played: 10
- Goals scored: 32 (3.2 per match)
- Top scorer(s): (Argentina) Juan Marvezzi (5 goals)

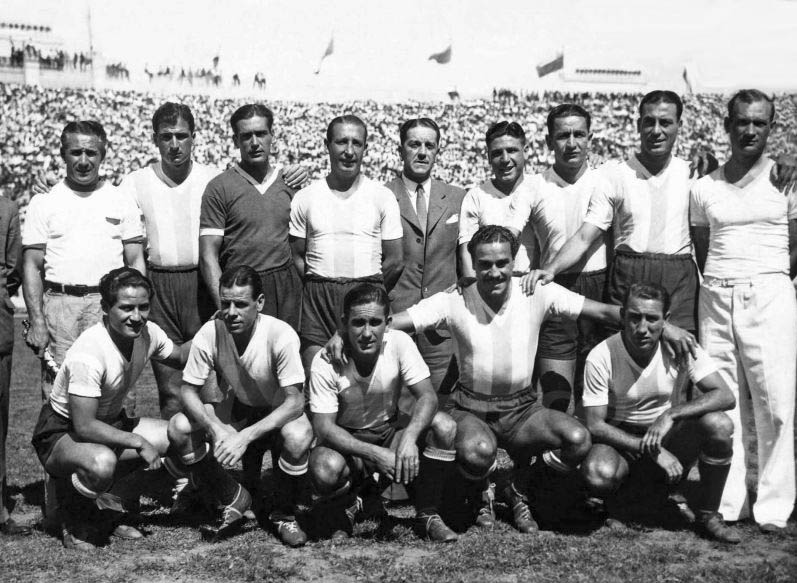
The Argentina squad that won its 6th South American title

The sixteenth edition of the South American Championship was held in Santiago, Chile from 2 February to 4 March.

With the purpose of celebrating the fourth centenary of Santiago's foundation by Pedro de Valdivia, Chile requested to host this tournament's edition. Because of that, this edition is considered extra (no trophy was handed to the winners).

The participating countries were Argentina, Chile, Ecuador, Peru, and Uruguay.

Bolivia, Brazil, Colombia and Paraguay withdrew from the tournament.

== Venues ==
Santiago
Campos de Sports
Capacity: 70,000
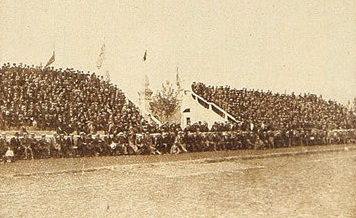

== Final round ==
Each team played against each of the other teams. Two points were awarded for a win, one point for a draw and zero points for a defeat.

Team	Pld	W	D	L	GF	GA	GD	Pts
Argentina	4	4	0	0	10	2	+8	8
Uruguay	4	3	0	1	10	1	+9	6
Chile	4	2	0	2	6	3	+3	4
Peru	4	1	0	3	5	5	0	2
Ecuador	4	0	0	4	1	21	−20	0

2 February 1941

Chile	5–0	Ecuador
Toro 10'; Sorrel 18', 78'; Pérez 25'; Contreras 43'

Estadio Nacional, Santiago
Referee: José Bartolomé Macías (Argentina)

9 February 1941

Uruguay	6–0	Ecuador
Rivero 9', 23', 87'; Gambetta 16'; Porta 39'; Laurido 75' (o.g.)

Estadio Nacional, Santiago
Referee: Alfredo Vargas (Chile)

9 February 1941

Chile	1–0	Peru
Pérez 20'

Estadio Nacional, Santiago
Referee: José Bartolomé Macías (Argentina)

12 February 1941

Argentina	2–1	Peru
Moreno 2', 72'		Socarraz 53'

Estadio Nacional, Santiago
Referee: Alfredo Vargas (Chile)

16 February 1941

Argentina	6–1	Ecuador
Marvezzi 3', 17', 28', 39', 59'; Moreno 30'		Freire 47'

Estadio Nacional, Santiago
Referee: Aníbal Tejada (Uruguay)

16 February 1941

Uruguay	2–0	Chile
Cruche 35'; Chirimini 78'

Estadio Nacional, Santiago
Referee: José Bartolomé Macías (Argentina)

23 February 1941

Peru	4–0	Ecuador
T. Fernández 25', 32', 48'; Vallejas 36'

Estadio Nacional, Santiago
Referee: Víctor Francisco Rivas (Chile)

23 February 1941

Argentina	1–0	Uruguay
Sastre 53'

Estadio Nacional, Santiago
Referee: Alfredo Vargas (Chile)

26 February 1941

Uruguay	2–0	Peru
Riephoff 37'; Varela 70'

Estadio Nacional, Santiago
Referee: José Bartolomé Macías (Argentina)

4 March 1941

Argentina	1–0	Chile
García 71'

Estadio Nacional, Santiago
Referee: Aníbal Tejada (Uruguay)

== Result ==
1941 South American Championship champions

Argentina
Sixth title

== Goal scorers ==
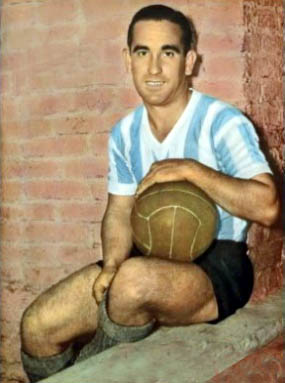
Juan Marvezzi, top scorer with 5 goals

5 goals

- (Argentina) Juan Marvezzi

3 goals

- (Argentina) José Manuel Moreno
- (Peru) Teodoro Fernández
- (Uruguay) Ismael Rivero

2 goals

- (Chile) Raúl Pérez
- (Chile) Enrique Sorrel

1 goal

- (Argentina) Enrique García
- (Argentina) Antonio Sastre
- (Chile) Armando Contreras
- (Chile) Raúl Toro
- (Ecuador) César Freire
- (Peru) César Socarraz
- (Peru) Manuel Vallejas
- (Uruguay) Oscar Chirimini
- (Uruguay) Ubaldo Cruche
- (Uruguay) Schubert Gambetta
- (Uruguay) Obdulio Varela
- (Uruguay) Roberto Porta
- (Uruguay) Juan P. Riephoff

Own Goal

- (Ecuador) Jorge Laurido (for Uruguay)
