= 1924 South American Championship squads =

List of footballers

The following are the squad lists for the countries that played in the 1924 South American Championship held in Uruguay. The participating countries were Argentina, Chile, Paraguay and Uruguay. The teams plays in a single round-robin tournament, earning two points for a win, one point for a draw, and zero points for a loss.

== Argentina ==
Head Coach: (Argentina) Ángel Vázquez (Note: Vázquez was the first coach in the history of Argentina national team.)

No.	Pos.	Player	Date of birth (age)	Caps	Goals	Club
—	DF	Florindo Bearzotti		12	0	(Argentine Football Association) Belgrano (R)
—	DF	Ludovico Bidoglio	5 February 1900 (aged 24)	13	0	(Argentine Football Association) Boca Juniors
—	DF	Roberto Cochrane		1	0	(Argentine Football Association) Tiro Federal
—	MF	Mario Fortunato	19 March 1905 (aged 19)	2	0	(Argentine Football Association) Huracán
—	FW	Alfredo Garasini	1 June 1897 (aged 27)	0	0	(Argentine Football Association) Boca Juniors
—	FW	Juan Tomás Loyarte	16 October 1901 (aged 22)	0	0	(Argentine Football Association) Colón
—	DF	Ángel Médici	20 December 1897 (aged 26)	15	0	(Argentine Football Association) Boca Juniors
—	FW	Cesáreo Onzari	1 February 1903 (aged 21)	11	5	(Argentine Football Association) Huracán
—	FW	Manuel Seoane	19 March 1902 (aged 22)	6	3	(Argentine Football Association) El Porvenir
—	MF	Emilio Solari	4 January 1900 (aged 24)	23	0	(Argentine Football Association) Sportivo Barracas
—	MF	Gabino Sosa	4 October 1899 (aged 25)	6	0	(Argentine Football Association) Central Córdoba (R)
—	FW	Domingo Tarasconi	20 December 1903 (aged 20)	7	5	(Argentine Football Association) Boca Juniors
—	GK	Américo Tesoriere	18 March 1899 (aged 25)	31	0	(Argentine Football Association) Boca Juniors
—	MF	Luis Vaccaro	6 November 1898 (aged 25)	6	0	(Argentine Football Association) Argentinos Juniors

== Chile ==
Head coach: (Chile) Carlos Acuña

No.	Pos.	Player	Date of birth (age)	Caps	Goals	Club
—	MF	Heriberto Abarzúa		0	0	(Football Federation of Chile) Primero de Mayo
—	FW	David Arellano	29 July 1901 (aged 23)	0	0	(Football Federation of Chile) Magallanes
—	DF	Francisco Arellano	6 December 1896 (aged 27)	0	0	(Football Federation of Chile) Magallanes
—	MF	Aurelio Domínguez	31 May 1896 (aged 28)	11	1	(Football Federation of Chile) Artillero de Costa
—	MF	Otto Ernst	7 September 1898 (aged 26)	1	0	(Football Federation of Chile) Magallanes
—	DF	Antenor Amable	2 June 1900 (aged 24)	0	0	(Football Federation of Chile) Ferroviarios
—	FW	Óscar Molina		0	0	(Football Federation of Chile) Ferroviarios
—	DF	Víctor Morales	10 May 1905 (aged 19)	0	0	(Football Federation of Chile) Camilo Henríquez
—	FW	José Olguín	2 August 1903 (aged 21)	0	0	(Football Federation of Chile) Escuela Normal
—	GK	Aníbal Ramírez	27 September 1903 (aged 21)	0	0	(Football Federation of Chile) Gold Cross
—	MF	Germán Reyes	20 November 1902 (aged 21)	0	0	(Football Federation of Chile) Liceo de Concepción
—	GK	Alberto Robles	7 September 1897 (aged 27)	0	0	(Football Federation of Chile) Arturo Fernández Vial
—	MF	Víctor Toro		3	0	(Football Federation of Chile) Diez de Julio

== Paraguay ==
Head Coach: (Paraguay) Manuel Fleitas Solich

No.	Pos.	Player	Date of birth (age)	Caps	Goals	Club
—	GK	Modesto Denis	9 March 1901 (aged 23)	7	0	(Paraguayan Football Association) Nacional
—	GK	Carlos Torres		0	0	(Paraguayan Football Association)
—	DF	Abdón Benítez Casco		0	0	(Paraguayan Football Association) Libertad
—	DF	Tomás Durand		0	0	(Paraguayan Football Association)
—	DF	Axel Sirvent		0	0	(Paraguayan Football Association) Olimpia
—	MF	Isidoro Benítez Casco		8	0	(Paraguayan Football Association) Libertad
—	MF	Roque Centurión Miranda		8	0	(Paraguayan Football Association) Guaraní
—	MF	Eusebio Díaz	21 June 1898 (aged 26)	3	0	(Paraguayan Football Association) Guaraní
—	MF	Manuel Fleitas Solich	30 December 1900 (aged 23)	8	0	(Paraguayan Football Association) Nacional
—	FW	Luciano Capdevila		8	0	(Paraguayan Football Association) Cerro Porteño
—	FW	Luis Fretes		6	2	(Paraguayan Football Association) Guaraní
—	FW	Ildefonso López		10	3	(Paraguayan Football Association) Guaraní
—	FW	Silvio Molinas		0	0	(Paraguayan Football Association) Olimpia
—	FW	Gerardo Rivas		11	3	(Paraguayan Football Association) Libertad
—	FW	Pasiano Urbita Sosa		0	0	(Paraguayan Football Association) Nacional

== Uruguay ==
Head Coach: (Uruguay) Ernesto Meliante

No.	Pos.	Player	Date of birth (age)	Caps	Goals	Club
—	DF	Juan Carlos Alzugaray		1	0	(Uruguayan Football Association) Rampla Juniors
—	MF	José Leandro Andrade	22 November 1901 (aged 22)	11	0	(Uruguayan Football Association) Bella Vista
—	DF	Pedro Arispe	30 September 1900 (aged 24)	4	0	(Uruguayan Football Association) Rampla Juniors
—	FW	Ángel Barlocco	14 December 1899 (aged 24)	1	0	(Uruguayan Football Association) Nacional
—	DF	Ramón Bucetta	13 September 1894 (aged 30)	0	0	(Uruguayan Football Association) Nacional
—	GK	Pedro Casella	31 October 1898 (aged 25)	7	0	(Uruguayan Football Association) Rampla Juniors
—	FW	Pedro Cea	1 September 1900 (aged 24)	10	6	(Uruguayan Football Association) Lito
—	MF	Alfredo Ghierra	31 August 1891 (aged 33)	9	0	(Uruguayan Football Association) Universal
—	GK	Andrés Mazali	22 July 1902 (aged 22)	7	0	(Uruguayan Football Association) Nacional
—	DF	José Nasazzi	24 March 1901 (aged 23)	10	0	(Uruguayan Football Association) Bella Vista
—	FW	Pedro Petrone	11 May 1905 (aged 19)	10	10	(Uruguayan Football Association) Nacional
—	FW	Ángel Romano	2 August 1893 (aged 31)	61	25	(Uruguayan Football Association) Nacional
—	FW	Zoilo Saldombide	26 October 1903 (aged 20)	3	1	(Uruguayan Football Association) Montevideo Wanderers
—	FW	Héctor Scarone	26 November 1898 (aged 25)	31	16	(Uruguayan Football Association) Nacional
—	FW	Santos Urdinarán	30 March 1900 (aged 24)	6	1	(Uruguayan Football Association) Nacional
—	DF	Fermín Uriarte	1 January 1902 (aged 22)	8	0	(Uruguayan Football Association) Lito
—	MF	José Vidal	15 December 1896 (aged 27)	7	1	(Uruguayan Football Association) Belgrano
—	MF	Alfredo Zibecchi	30 October 1894 (aged 29)	37	0	(Uruguayan Football Association) Nacional
—	MF	Pedro Zingone	20 July 1898 (aged 26)	2	0	(Uruguayan Football Association) Lito
