= Paraguay national football team records and statistics =

This is a list of statistical records for the Paraguay national football team.

== Individual records ==
=== Player records ===
As of 4 July 2026
Players in bold are still active at international level.

==== Most capped players ====
Rank	Player	Caps	Goals	Career
1	Paulo da Silva	148	3	2000–2017
2	Justo Villar	120	0	1999–2018
3	Roque Santa Cruz	112	32	1999–2016
4	Carlos Gamarra	110	12	1993–2006
5	Cristian Riveros	101	16	2005–2018
6	Roberto Acuña	100	5	1993–2011
6	Denis Caniza	100	1	1996–2010
8	**Gustavo Gómez**	94	4	2013–present
9	Celso Ayala	85	6	1993–2003
10	José Saturnino Cardozo	82	25	1991–2006

==== Top goalscorers ====
Rank	Player	Goals	Caps	Ratio	Career
1	Roque Santa Cruz	32	112	0.29	1999–2016
2	José Saturnino Cardozo	25	82	0.3	1991–2006
3	Cristian Riveros	16	101	0.16	2005–2018
4	Saturnino Arrúa	13	27	0.48	1969–1980
4	Romerito	13	34	0.38	1979–1989
4	Nelson Valdez	13	77	0.17	2004–2017
7	Óscar Cardozo	12	58	0.21	2006–2023
7	Carlos Gamarra	12	110	0.11	1993–2006
9	Roberto Cabañas	11	28	0.39	1981–1993
9	Miguel Ángel Benítez	11	30	0.37	1996–1999

== Competitive record ==
=== FIFA World Cup ===
Champions Runners-up Third place Fourth place

FIFA World Cup record										Qualification record					
Year	Round	Position	Pld	W	D*	L	GF	GA	Squad	Pld	W	D	L	GF	GA
(Uruguay) 1930	Group stage	9th	2	1	0	1	1	3	Squad	Qualified as invitees					
(Italy) 1934	Did not enter									Declined participation					
(France) 1938	Did not enter									Declined participation					
(Brazil) 1950	Group stage	11th	2	0	1	1	2	4	Squad	Qualified automatically					
(Switzerland) 1954	Did not qualify									4	2	0	2	8	6
(Sweden) 1958	Group stage	12th	3	1	1	1	9	12	Squad	4	3	0	1	11	4
(Chile) 1962	Did not qualify									2	0	1	1	0	1
(England) 1966	Did not qualify									4	1	1	2	3	5
(Mexico) 1970	Did not qualify									6	4	0	2	6	5
(West Germany) 1974	Did not qualify									4	2	1	1	8	5
(Argentina) 1978	Did not qualify									4	1	2	1	3	3
(Spain) 1982	Did not qualify									4	1	0	3	3	6
(Mexico) 1986	Round of 16	13th	4	1	2	1	4	6	Squad	8	3	3	2	14	8
(Italy) 1990	Did not qualify									4	2	0	2	6	7
(United States) 1994	Did not qualify									6	1	4	1	6	7
(France) 1998	Round of 16	14th	4	1	2	1	3	2	Squad	16	9	2	5	21	14
(South Korea) (Japan) 2002	Round of 16	16th	4	1	1	2	6	7	Squad	18	9	3	6	29	23
(Germany) 2006	Group stage	18th	3	1	0	2	2	2	Squad	18	8	4	6	23	23
(South Africa) 2010	Quarter-finals	8th	5	1	3	1	3	2	Squad	18	10	3	5	24	16
(Brazil) 2014	Did not qualify									16	3	3	10	17	31
(Russia) 2018	Did not qualify									18	7	3	8	19	25
(Qatar) 2022	Did not qualify									18	3	7	8	12	26
(Canada) (Mexico) (United States) 2026	Round of 16	16th	5	1	2	2	3	6	Squad	18	7	7	4	14	10
(Morocco) (Portugal) (Spain) 2030	Qualified as commemorative match hosts									Qualified as commemorative match hosts					
(Saudi Arabia) 2034	To be determined									To be determined					
Total	Quarter-finals	9/23	32	8	12	12	33	44	—	190	76	44	70	227	225

*Draws include knockout matches decided via penalty shoot-out.

=== Copa América ===
South American Championship / Copa América record
Year	Round	Position	Pld	W	D*	L	GF	GA	Squad
(Argentina) 1916	Not a CONMEBOL member								
(Uruguay) 1917	Not a CONMEBOL member								
(Brazil) 1919	Not a CONMEBOL member								
(Chile) 1920	Not a CONMEBOL member								
(Argentina) 1921	Fourth place	4th	3	1	0	2	2	7	Squad
(Brazil) 1922	Runners-up	2nd	5	2	1	2	5	6	Squad
(Uruguay) 1923	Third place	3rd	3	1	0	2	4	6	Squad
(Uruguay) 1924	Third place	3rd	3	1	1	1	4	4	Squad
(Argentina) 1925	Third place	3rd	4	0	0	4	4	13	Squad
(Chile) 1926	Fourth place	4th	4	1	0	3	8	20	Squad
(Peru) 1927	Did not enter								
(Argentina) 1929	Runners-up	2nd	3	2	0	1	9	4	Squad
(Peru) 1935	Did not enter								
(Argentina) 1937	Fourth place	4th	5	2	0	3	8	16	Squad
(Peru) 1939	Third place	3rd	4	2	0	2	9	8	Squad
(Chile) 1941	Did not enter								
(Uruguay) 1942	Fourth place	4th	6	2	2	2	11	10	Squad
(Chile) 1945	Did not enter								
(Argentina) 1946	Third place	3rd	5	2	1	2	8	8	Squad
(Ecuador) 1947	Runners-up	2nd	7	5	1	1	16	11	Squad
(Brazil) 1949	Runners-up	2nd	8	6	0	2	21	13	Squad
(Peru) 1953	Champions	1st	7	4	2	1	14	8	Squad
(Chile) 1955	Fifth place	5th	5	1	1	3	7	14	Squad
(Uruguay) 1956	Fifth place	5th	5	0	2	3	3	8	Squad
(Peru) 1957	Did not enter								
(Argentina) 1959	Third place	3rd	6	3	0	3	12	12	Squad
(Ecuador) 1959	Fifth place	5th	4	0	1	3	6	11	Squad
(Bolivia) 1963	Runners-up	2nd	6	4	1	1	13	7	Squad
(Uruguay) 1967	Fourth place	4th	5	2	0	3	9	13	Squad
1975	Group stage	7th	4	1	1	2	5	5	Squad
1979	Champions	1st	9	4	4	1	13	7	Squad
1983	Third place	3rd	2	0	2	0	1	1	Squad
(Argentina) 1987	Group stage	9th	2	0	1	1	0	3	Squad
(Brazil) 1989	Fourth place	4th	7	3	1	3	9	10	Squad
(Chile) 1991	Group stage	6th	4	2	0	2	7	8	Squad
(Ecuador) 1993	Quarter-finals	8th	4	1	1	2	2	7	Squad
(Uruguay) 1995	Quarter-finals	6th	4	2	1	1	6	5	Squad
(Bolivia) 1997	Quarter-finals	7th	4	1	1	2	2	5	Squad
(Paraguay) 1999	Quarter-finals	6th	4	2	2	0	6	1	Squad
(Colombia) 2001	Group stage	10th	3	0	2	1	4	6	Squad
(Peru) 2004	Quarter-finals	5th	4	2	1	1	5	5	Squad
(Venezuela) 2007	Quarter-finals	5th	4	2	0	2	8	8	Squad
(Argentina) 2011	Runners-up	2nd	6	0	5	1	5	8	Squad
(Chile) 2015	Fourth place	4th	6	1	3	2	6	12	Squad
(United States) 2016	Group stage	12th	3	0	1	2	1	3	Squad
(Brazil) 2019	Quarter-finals	8th	4	0	3	1	3	4	Squad
(Brazil) 2021	Quarter-finals	6th	5	2	1	2	8	6	Squad
(United States) 2024	Group stage	14th	3	0	0	3	3	8	Squad
Total	2 Titles	39/44	180	64	43	73	267	311	—

=== Pan American Games ===
Pan American Games record
Year	Round	Position	Pld	W	D*	L	GF	GA
(Argentina) 1951	Fourth place	4th	4	1	0	3	5	14
(Mexico) 1955	Did not participate							
(United States) 1959	Did not participate							
(Brazil) 1963	Did not participate							
(Canada) 1967	Did not participate							
(Colombia) 1971	Did not participate							
(Mexico) 1975	Did not participate							
(Puerto Rico) 1979	Did not participate							
(Venezuela) 1983	Did not participate							
(United States) 1987	Preliminary round	9th	3	0	2	1	1	8
(Cuba) 1991	Did not qualify							
(Argentina) 1995	Quarter-finals	7th	4	2	0	2	4	3
Since 1999	See Paraguay national under-23 football team							
Total	Fourth place	3/12	11	3	2	6	10	25

== Head-to-head record ==
The list shown below shows the Paraguay national football team all-time international record against opposing nations. The stats are composed of FIFA World Cup and qualifiers, the Copa América, as well as numerous other international friendly tournaments and matches.

Updated to 2 October 2026 after the match against Colombia.

Positive Record Neutral Record Negative Record

Opponent	Pld	W	D	L	GF	GA	GD	Win %
Argentina	108	17	35	56	113	219	−106	15.74%
Armenia	2	1	0	1	3	2	+1	50%
Australia	6	0	4	2	2	4	−2	0%
Austria	1	0	1	0	0	0	0	0%
Bahrain	1	1	0	0	2	1	+1	100%
Belgium	3	1	1	1	3	3	0	33.3%
Bolivia	72	37	19	16	139	76	+63	51.39%
Bosnia and Herzegovina	1	1	0	0	3	0	+3	100.00%
Brazil	85	12	22	51	68	184	−116	14.11%
Bulgaria	2	1	1	0	1	0	+1	50%
Cameroon	1	1	0	0	2	1	+1	100%
Canada	1	0	1	0	0	0	0	0%
Chile	69	30	8	31	94	96	−2	43.47%
China	3	1	1	1	4	3	+1	33.3%
Colombia	52	19	10	23	56	61	−5	36.53%
Costa Rica	10	3	3	4	7	7	0	30%
Czech Republic	1	0	0	1	0	1	−1	0%
Denmark	1	0	1	0	1	1	0	0%
Ecuador	42	22	8	12	72	52	+20	52.38%
El Salvador	6	6	0	0	11	1	+10	100%
England	3	0	0	3	0	8	−8	0%
France	6	0	2	4	4	15	−11	0%
Georgia	1	1	0	0	1	0	+1	100%
Germany	3	0	2	1	4	5	−1	0%
Greece	2	2	0	0	3	0	+3	100%
Guadeloupe	1	1	0	0	2	0	+2	100%
Guatemala	11	9	2	0	25	10	+15	81.8%
Honduras	7	2	4	1	9	6	+3	37.5%
Hong Kong	2	1	1	0	8	1	+7	50%
Hungary	1	0	1	0	1	1	0	0%
Indonesia	1	1	0	0	3	2	+1	100%
Iran	1	0	1	0	1	1	0	0%
Iraq	1	1	0	0	1	0	+1	100%
Italy	3	0	1	2	2	6	−4	0%
Ivory Coast	2	0	2	0	3	3	0	0%
Jamaica	6	4	0	2	11	7	+4	66.6%
Japan	12	2	5	5	12	17	−5	16.67%
Jordan	1	1	0	0	4	2	+2	100%
Martinique	1	1	0	0	2	0	+2	100%
Mexico	22	6	5	11	19	38	−19	27.27%
Morocco	2	0	1	1	1	2	–1	0%
Netherlands	2	0	1	1	1	3	−2	0%
New Zealand	3	2	1	0	5	2	+3	66.6%
Nicaragua	2	2	0	0	6	0	+6	100%
Nigeria	2	1	1	0	4	2	+2	50%
North Korea	1	1	0	0	1	0	+1	100%
North Macedonia	1	1	0	0	1	0	+1	100%
Norway	1	0	1	0	2	2	0	0%
Oman	1	1	0	0	1	0	+1	100%
Panama	6	5	1	0	10	1	+9	83.3%
Peru	60	25	16	19	79	67	+12	41.67%
Poland	1	1	0	0	4	0	+4	100%
Portugal	1	0	1	0	0	0	0	0%
Qatar	4	1	2	1	6	5	+1	25%
Republic of Ireland	2	0	0	2	1	4	−3	0%
Romania	2	1	0	1	4	3	+1	50%
Saudi Arabia	3	0	3	0	1	1	0	0%
Scotland	1	1	0	0	3	2	+1	100%
Serbia (Note: Includes matches against Yugoslavia.)	4	1	1	2	6	6	0	25%
Slovakia	2	1	1	0	3	1	+2	50%
Slovenia	1	1	0	0	3	1	+2	100%
South Africa	5	1	3	1	6	7	−1	20%
South Korea	8	2	3	3	8	9	–1	25%
Spain	4	0	2	2	1	4	−3	0%
Sweden	3	1	1	1	4	4	0	33.3%
Togo	1	1	0	0	4	2	+2	100%
Trinidad and Tobago	3	1	2	0	5	3	+2	33.3%
Turkey	2	1	1	0	1	0	+1	50.00%
United Arab Emirates	2	1	1	0	1	0	+1	50%
United States	10	2	2	6	9	15	−6	20%
Uruguay	79	26	20	33	96	116	−20	32.91%
Venezuela	29	19	5	5	51	25	+26	65.51%
Wales	1	0	1	0	0	0	0	0%
Total	802	285	212	305	1028	1118	−90	35.53%
