= Karłowicz =

Karłowicz is a gender-neutral Polish surname that may refer to the following notable people:

- Dariusz Karłowicz (born 1964), Polish philosopher, university lecturer, columnist, and a book publisher
- Jan Karłowicz (1836–1903), ethnographer, musicologist, composer, linguist, folklorist, lexicographer, dialectologist, one of the first Lithuanianists
- Mieczysław Karłowicz (1876–1909), Polish composer and conductor
- Mieczysław Karłowicz (cyclist) (born 1963), Polish cyclist

== See also ==
- Karlovich, Russian-language equivalent
- Karlović, Croatian surname
