= Croatian Argentines =

(Argentina) Croatian Argentines (Croatia)
Hrvati u Argentini (Croatian) Croata-argentinos (Spanish)
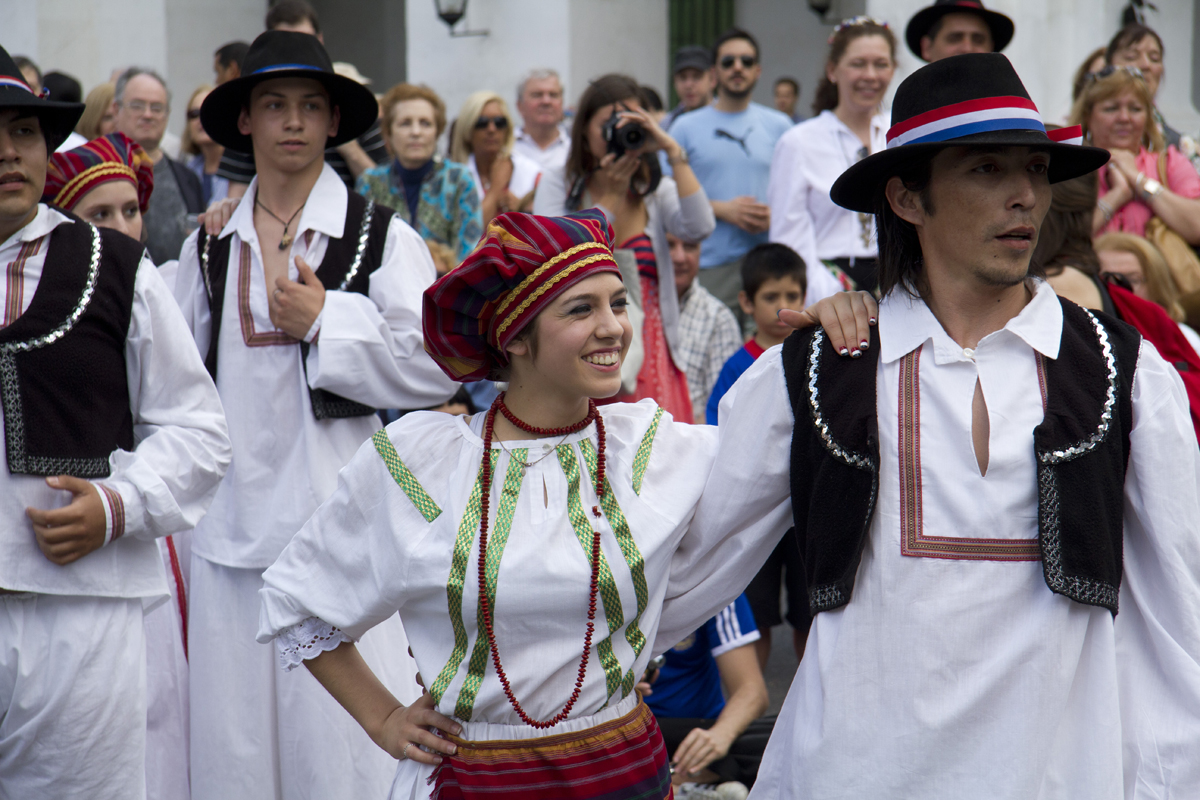
- Celebrations of the Croatian community Buenos Aires (2011)

Total population
- 350,000

Regions with significant populations
- In Buenos Aires, Santa Fe, Chaco, Mendoza and Argentine Patagonia

Languages
- Argentine Spanish • Croatian

Religion
- Catholicism

Related ethnic groups
- Croats; Croatian Brazilians; Croatian Uruguayans; Croatian Americans; Croatian Canadians; Croatian Australians

Croatian Argentines are Argentine citizens of Croatian descent or Croatian-born people who reside in Argentina. Croats and their descendants settled in Buenos Aires, the homonymous province, Santa Fe, Córdoba, Chaco, and Patagonia. Argentines of Croatian descent number over 350,000.

== History ==
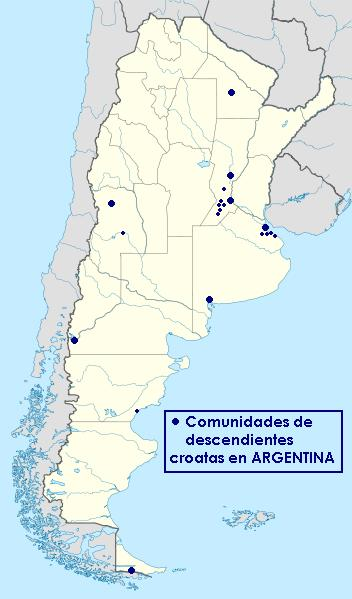
Communities of Croatian descendants in Argentina

At the turn of the 19th and 20th centuries there were 133 settlements, with some 120,000 Croats in Argentina, for the most part hailing from the coastal regions of Dalmatia and the Croatian Littoral, who were among the first European immigrants to settle in the Argentine pampas. The pioneers from the island of Hvar were followed by emigrants from other parts of Dalmatia and the other historic Croatian lands, mostly present-day Croatia.

The most financially successful of all the Croats in Argentina was also almost the first to arrive: Nikola Mihanović came to Montevideo, Uruguay in 1867, and, having settled in Buenos Aires, Mihanović owned 350 vessels of one kind or another by 1909, including 82 steamers. By 1918, he employed 5,000 people, mostly from his native Dalmatia. Mihanović by himself was thus a major factor in building up a Croat community that remains primarily Dalmatian to this day.

The second wave of Croat immigration was far more numerous, totaling 15,000 by 1939. Mostly peasants, these immigrants fanned out to work the land in Buenos Aires Province, Santa Fe, Chaco, and Patagonia. This wave was accompanied by numerous clergy to attend their spiritual needs, especially Franciscans.

If the first two waves had been primarily economic, the third wave after World War II was eminently political. Some 20,000 Croatian political refugees came to Argentina, and most became construction workers on Peron's public works projects until they started to pick up some Spanish. Argentina today has the third-largest number of Croatian descendants in the world.

== Notable Croatian Argentines ==
- Ante Garmaz – Actor, fashion designer, television presenter and model
- Alejandro Spajić – Volleyball player
- Alicia Kirchner Ostoić – Politician
- Mateo Bajamich – Football player
- Daniel Bilos – Football player
- Daniel Orsanic – Tennis player
- Darío Cvitanich – Football player
- Diego Maradona – Football player. His maternal grandmother, Salvadora Kariolic, was of Croatian origin.
- Davor Ivo Stier – Croatian Democratic Union politician
- Antonio Mohamed Matijevich – Football player
- El Trinche - Football player. Both of his parents were of Croatian descent.
- Emilio Ogñénovich – Bishop of the Roman Catholic Church
- Estanislao Esteban Karlic – Cardinal of the Roman Catholic Church
- Fernando Siro – Born Francisco Luksich, actor and director
- Iván Gabrich – Football player
- Javier Milei - President of Argentina
- Javier Frana – Tennis player
- José María Buljubasich – Football player
- Juan Vucetich – Anthropologist and police official who pioneered the use of fingerprinting
- Juan Yustrich – Football goalkeeper
- Leonardo Pisculichi – Football player
- Lita Stantic – Filmmaker
- Ljerko Spiller – Violinist
- Marcos Milinkovic – Volleyball player
- Martin Šarić – Football player
- Nicolás Mihanovich – Shipping magnate
- Nicolás Pavlovich – Football player
- Néstor Kirchner – Former President of Argentina
- Juan Pablo Krilanovich – Football player
- Pablo Vranjicán – Football player
- Sandra Mihanovich – Singer/songwriter
- Sebastián Crismanich – Taekwondo athlete
- Federico Grabich – Swimmer
- Maximiliano Stanic – Basketball player
- Drago Pilsel – Civil rights activist
- Mario Markic – Journalist and writer
- Ramón Miérez – Football player. His mother is of Croatian origin.
- Roberto Curilovic - Navy pilot awarded with Medal of Valour in Combat

== See also ==
- Argentina–Croatia relations
- Argentines of European descent
- Serbian Argentines
- Armenian Argentines
- German Argentines
