= Argentina–Croatia relations =

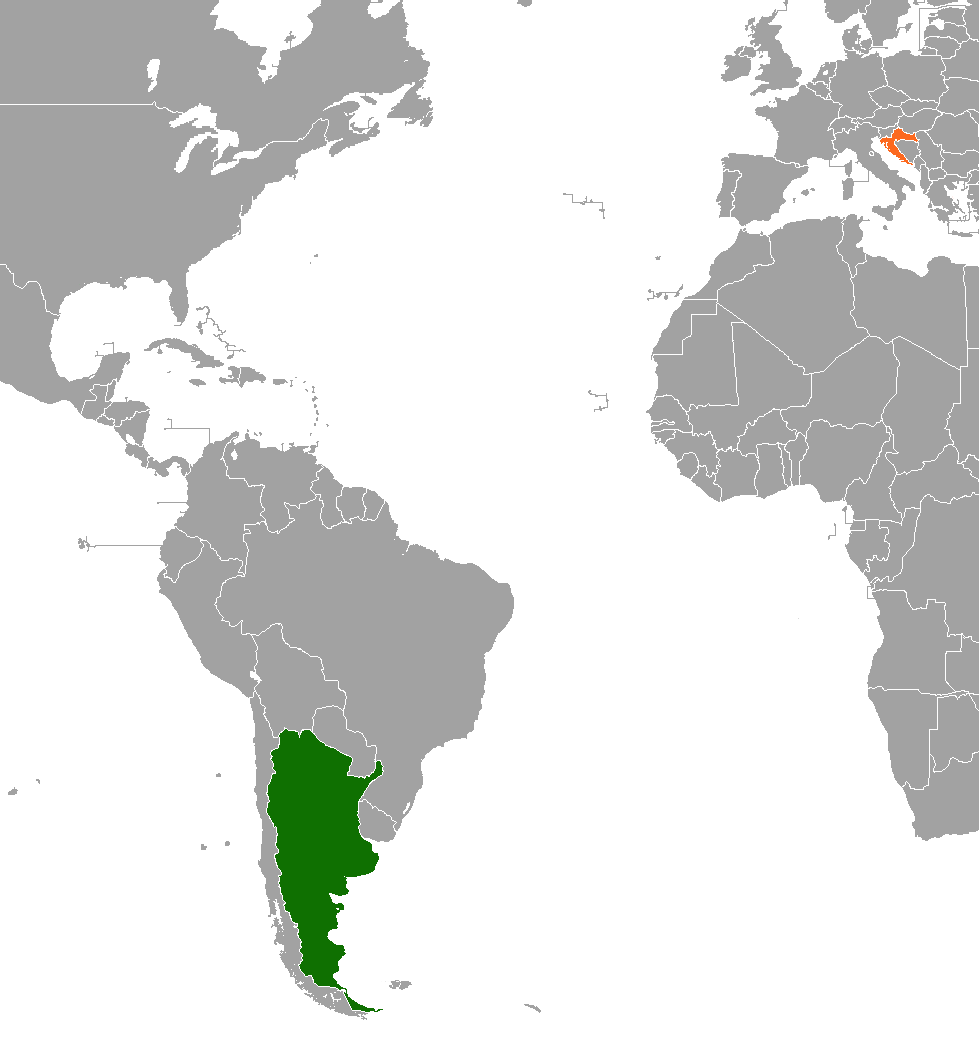

- Argentina: Croatia

Argentina–Croatia relations are the historical and bilateral relations between the Argentine Republic and the Republic of Croatia, the importance of which centers on the history of Croatian migration to Argentina. There is approximately a community of 250,000 Argentines of Croatian descent. Argentina is accredited to Croatia from its embassy in Budapest, Hungary, while Croatia has an embassy in Buenos Aires. Both nations are members of the World Trade Organization and the United Nations.

== History ==
In 1864, Argentina and the Austro-Hungarian Empire (which Croatia was part of at the time) established diplomatic relations. In 1918 after World War I, the Austro-Hungarian Empire dissolved and Croatia soon became part of Yugoslavia. After World War II, approximately 35,000 Croatians immigrated to Argentina. In June 1991, Croatia declared its independence from Yugoslavia.

During the Croatian War of Independence, the Argentine government of President Carlos Menem smuggled arms to Croatia despite the United Nations embargo imposed on Croatia (and all territories of Yugoslavia). Argentine weapons for Croatia were sent in seven shipments between 1991 and 1995. Approximately 400 Argentines (primarily of Croatian descent) fought for Croatia in the country's war for independence. Argentina also contributed soldiers to the United Nations Confidence Restoration Operation in Croatia. In January 1993, Argentine President Carlos Menem paid a visit to Croatia to visit the Argentine troops stationed in the country.

After its independence, Argentina recognized and established diplomatic relations with Croatia on 13 April 1992, becoming the first American nation to recognize Croatia. Soon after the establishment of diplomatic relations, Croatia opened a resident embassy in Buenos Aires. In 1994, Croatian President Franjo Tuđman paid a visit to Argentina, becoming the first Croatian head-of-state to visit the South American nation.

In May 2003, Argentine President Néstor Kirchner Ostoić (of Croatian descent) was elected President of Argentina. In April 2010, the second meeting of the Croatia-Argentina interparliamentary friendship group was held in the Croatian Parliament in Zagreb and attended by Argentine Secretary of Foreign Relations Victorio Taccetti. In October 2017, Croatian Deputy Foreign Minister Zdravka Bušić paid a visit to Argentina to attend the 2nd Political Consultations Meeting between both nations.

In March 2018, Croatian President Kolinda Grabar-Kitarović paid a visit to Argentina and met with President Mauricio Macri. While in Argentina President Grabar-Kitarović also traveled to Rosario and San Miguel de Tucumán to meet with members of the Croatian-Argentine community.

== High-level visits ==
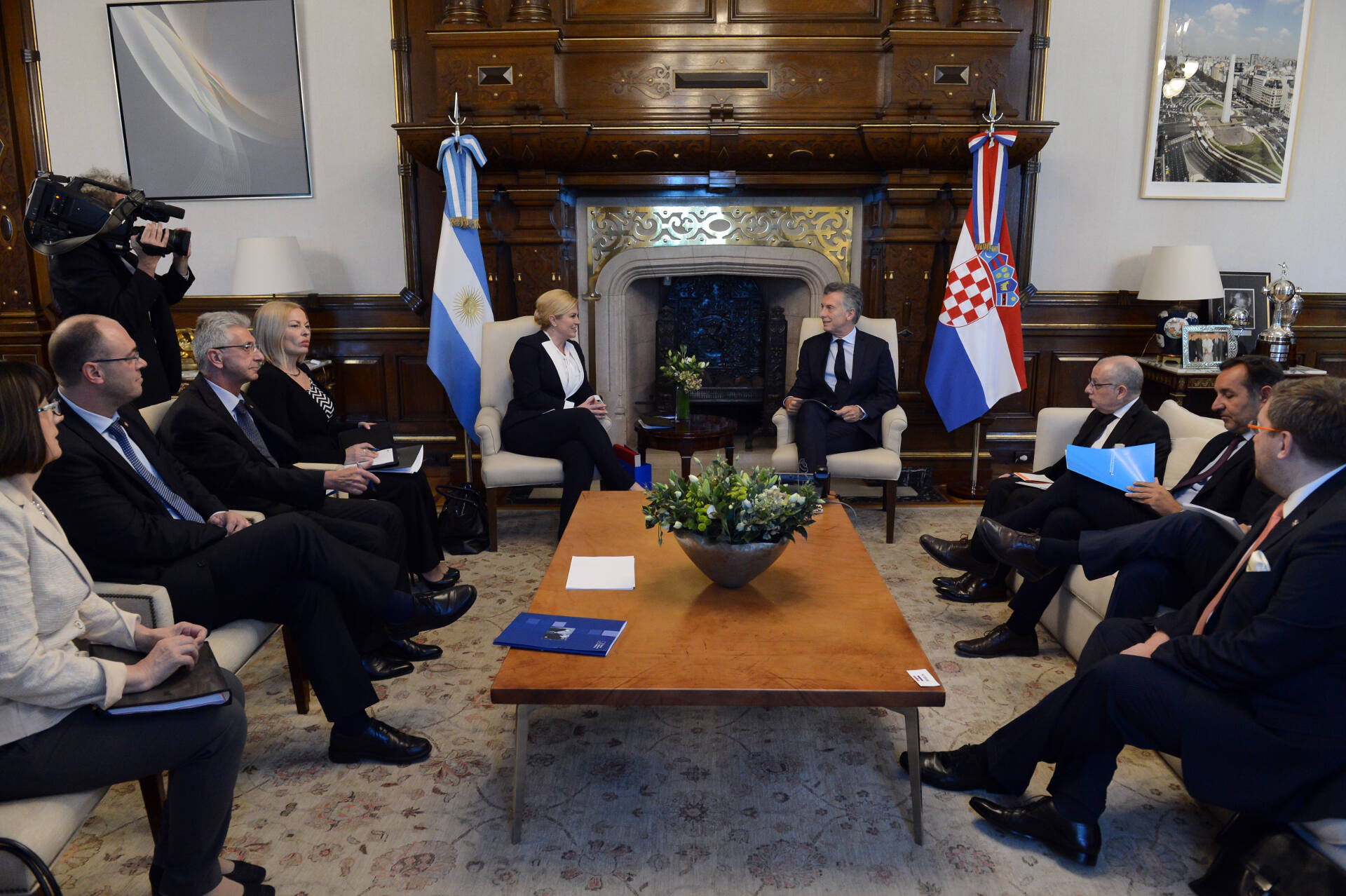
Argentine President Mauricio Macri and Croatian President Kolinda Grabar-Kitarović in Buenos Aires; March 2018.

High-level visits from Argentina to Croatia

- President Carlos Menem (1993)
- Secretary of Foreign Relations Victorio Taccetti (2010)

High-level visits from Croatia to Argentina

- President Franjo Tuđman (1994)
- President Kolinda Grabar-Kitarović (2018)
- Deputy Foreign Minister Zdravka Bušić (2017, 2018)
- Foreign Minister Gordan Grlić-Radman (2024)

== Bilateral agreements ==
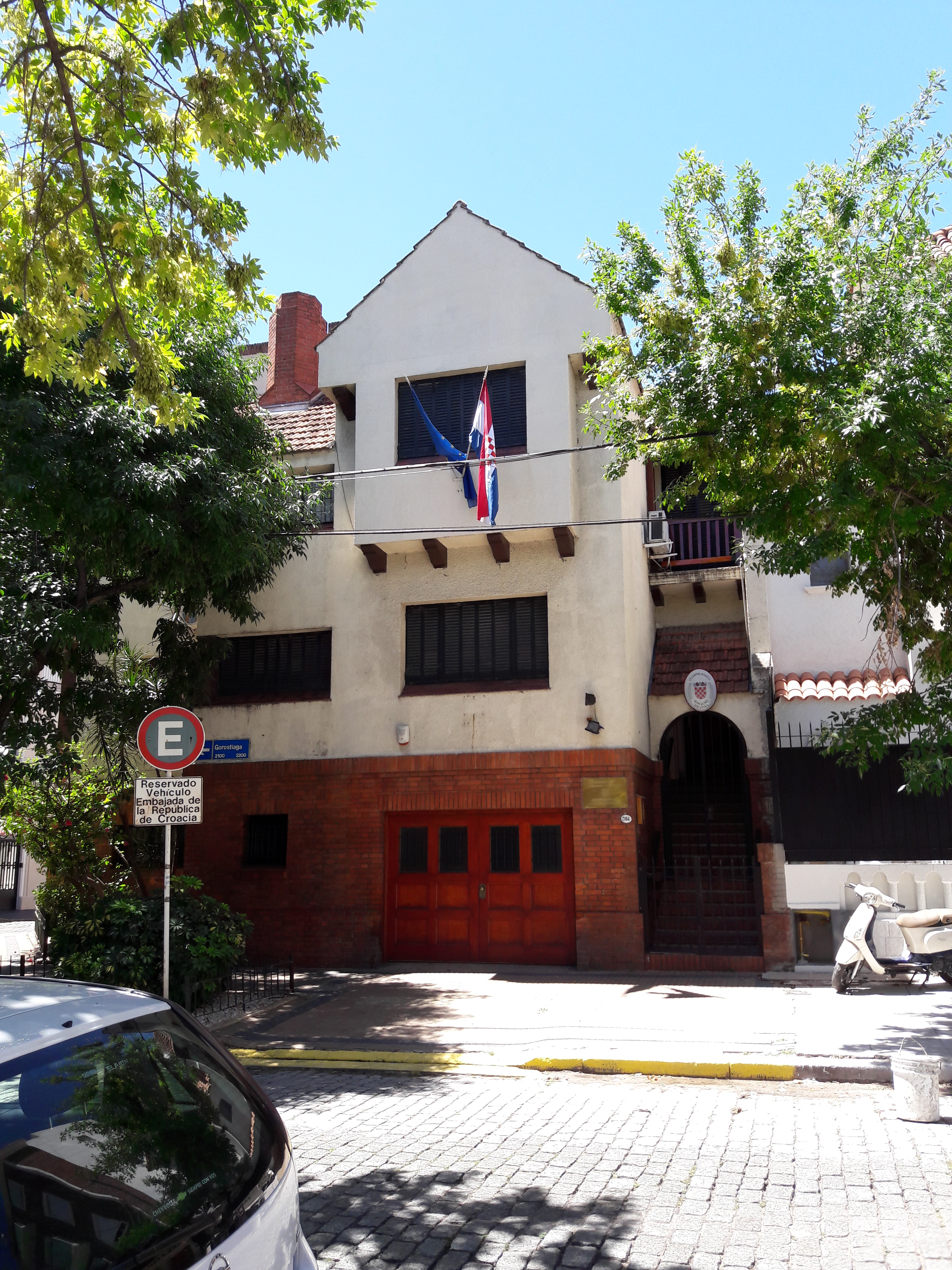
Embassy of Croatia in Buenos Aires

Both nations have signed several bilateral agreements such as an Agreement on the Promotion and Mutual Protection of Investments (1994); Agreement on Trade and Economic Cooperation (1994); Visa Waiver Agreement (1994); Agreement of Cooperation in the Field of Animal Health (2000); Agreement in Educational Cooperation (2007); Agreement in Economic Cooperation (2014); Agreement of Cooperation in the Fields of Science and Technology (2014); Memorandum of Understanding in the field of diplomatic training between the diplomatic academies of both nations (2018); and an Agreement in Cultural Cooperation (2018).

== Resident diplomatic missions ==
- Argentina is accredited to Croatia from its embassy in Budapest, Hungary.
- Croatia has an embassy in Buenos Aires.

== See also ==
- Foreign relations of Argentina
- Foreign relations of Croatia
- Croatian Argentines
- Argentina–European Union relations
