= Argentina–Greece relations =

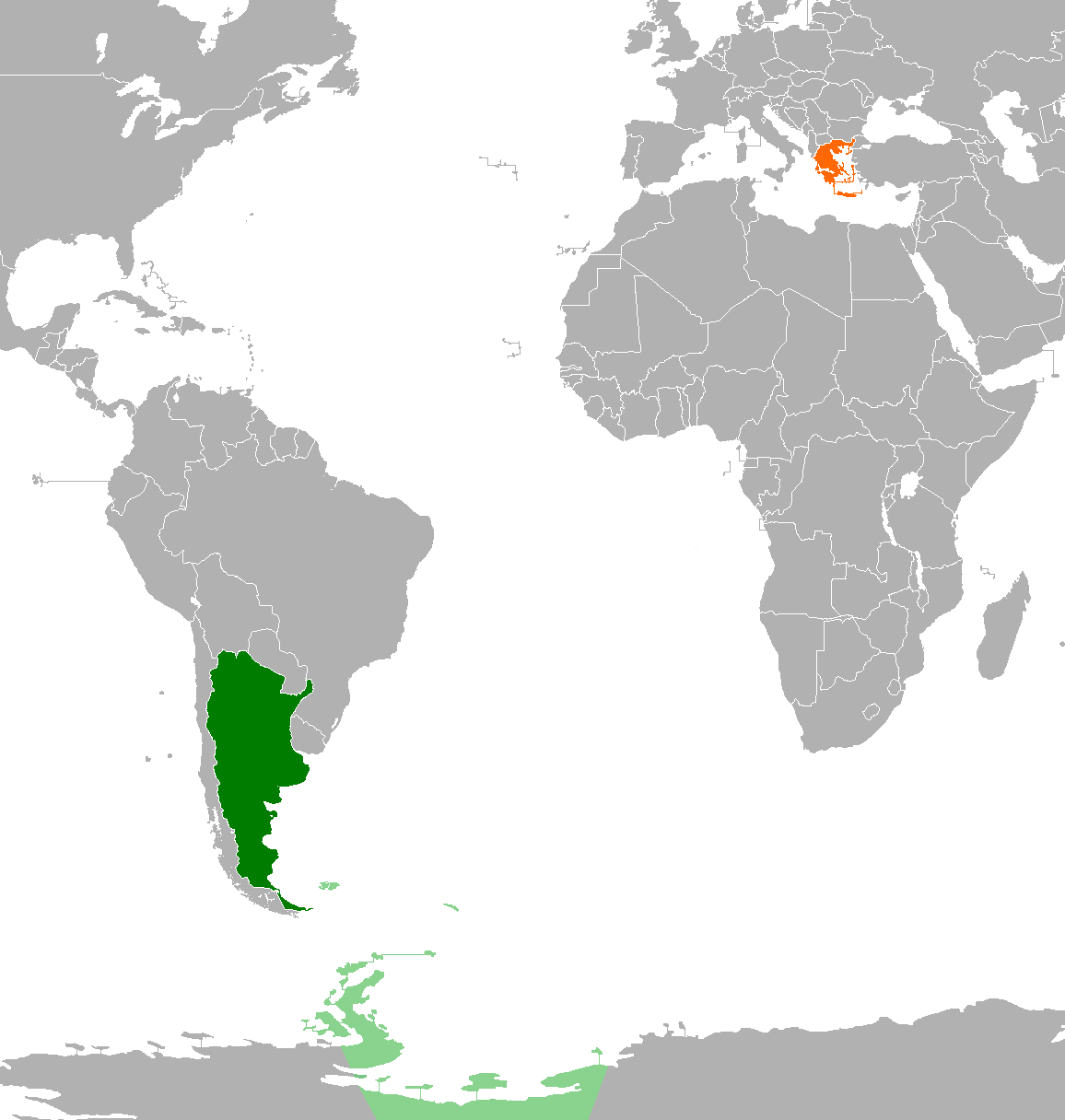
- Argentina: Greece

Foreign relations between Argentina and Greece have existed for about half a century. Both countries are represented by an embassy in the other one's capital. According to the Greek foreign ministry, at least 50,000 persons of Greek descent live in Argentina with about 5,000 with Greek passports. The majority of Greeks live in Buenos Aires.

== History ==
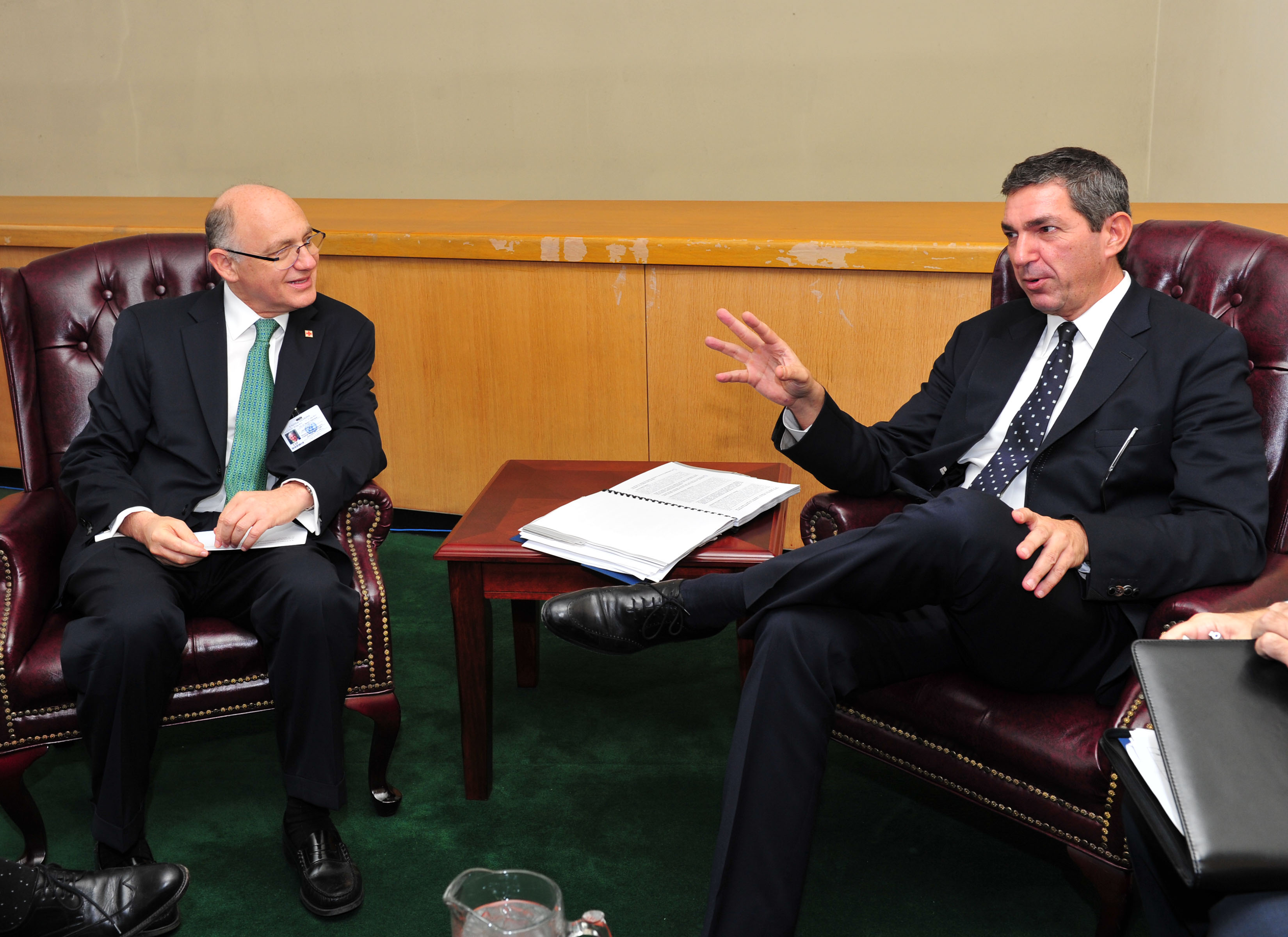
Greek Foreign Minister Stavros Lambrinidis meeting with Argentine Foreign Minister Hector Timerman on the sidelines of the 66th UN General Assembly

On June 1, 1959, the two countries signed an agreement on the Abolition of Visas for Holders of Diplomatic and Service passports. On January 31, 1975, they signed an agreement on the Abolition of Tourist Visas for the Citizens of the two Countries.

In 2008 Greek Deputy Foreign Ministers Yannis Valinakis and Theodoros Kassimis visited Argentina, and met with representatives of the Greek community. Deputy Minister Valinakis talked about the important role played by the Greek communities in Argentina, and signed a bilateral agreement on Economic Cooperation. For his part, Deputy Minister Kassimis met with Victorio Taccetti, and signed a bilateral agreement on Scientific and Technological Cooperation. He also met with relatives of members of the Greek community, who disappeared during the military dictatorship.

== Economic relations ==
The bilateral trade volume is low. Argentine exports to Greece remained limited but steady during the period 2004–2008. In October 2008, a representation of the Argentine Federal Council for Investments visited Greece aiming at the strengthening of the bilateral cooperation in the field of renewable energy sources.

== Resident diplomatic missions ==
- Argentina has an embassy in Athens.
- Greece has an embassy in Buenos Aires

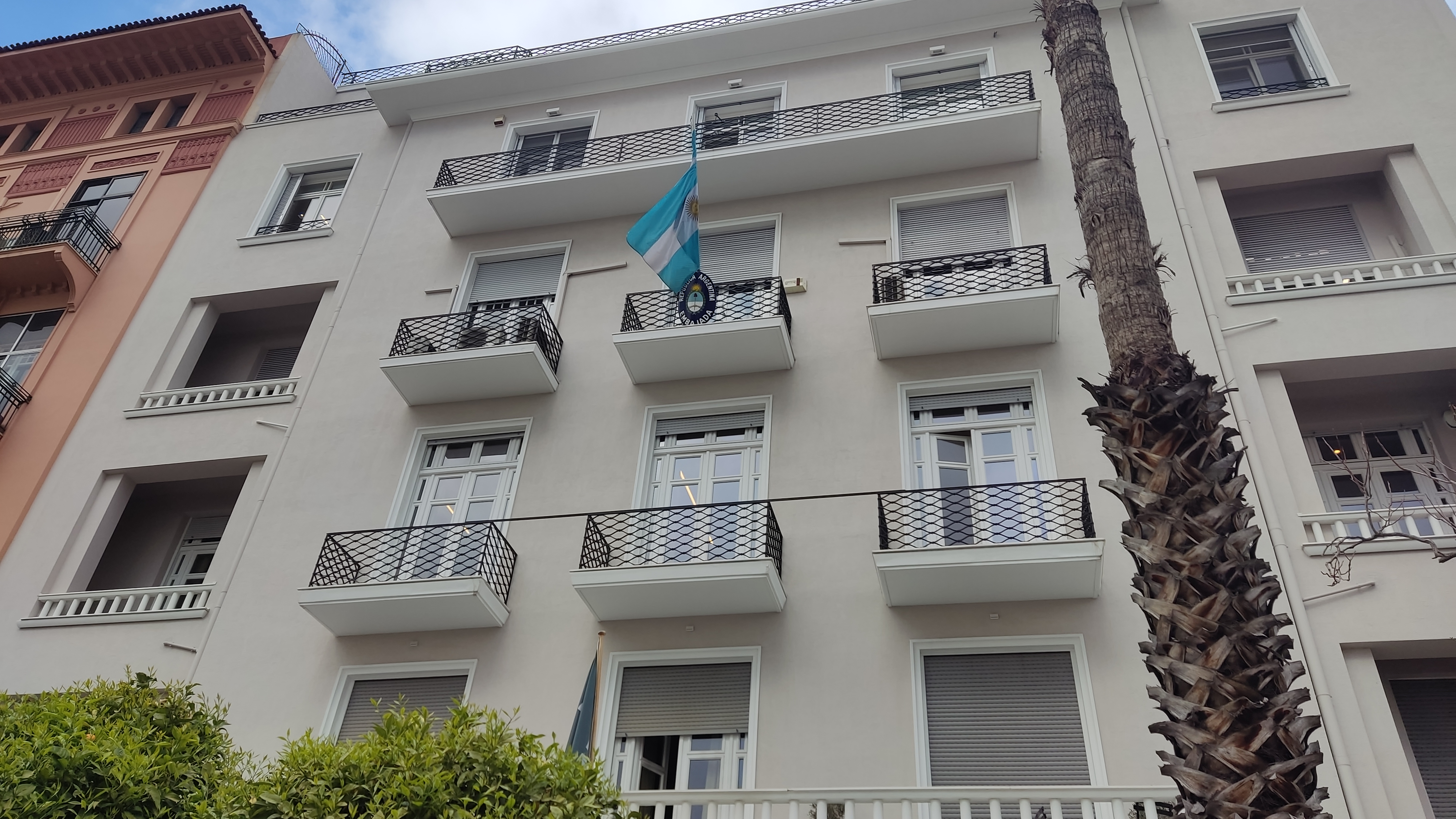
Embassy of Argentina in Athens

== See also ==
- Foreign relations of Argentina
- Foreign relations of Greece
- Greeks in Argentina
