= Kurlovich =

Kurlovich (Russian: Курло́вич, Belarusian: Курловіч, Polish: Kurłowicz, Ukrainian: Курлович) is a gender-neutral Slavic surname that may refer to:

- Aleksandr Kurlovich (born 1961), Belarusian weightlifter
- Boguslav Kurlovich (born 1948), Russian-Finnish scientific agronomist
- Vadim Kurlovich (born 1992), Belarusian football player

== See also ==
- Karlovich
