= Karpovich =

Karpovich is a surname that may refer to:

- Andrei Karpovich (born 1981), Kazakh footballer who currently plays for FC Lokomotiv Astana
- Ihar Karpovich (born 1988), Belarusian footballer who currently plays for Naftan Novopolotsk
- Maksim Karpovich (born 1986), Belarusian footballer who currently plays for Naftan Novopolotsk
- Michael Karpovich (1888–1959), Russian-American historian of Russia
- Miroslava Karpovich (born 1986), Russian actress of Ukrainian origin

== See also ==
- Karlovich
