= 1933 Copa Beccar Varela Final =

1933 Copa Beccar Varela
- Event: Copa Beccar Varela
Racing	Central Córdoba (R)
2	2
- Match suspended on 88', points and title awarded to Central Córdoba
- Date: February 11, 1934
- Venue: River Plate, Buenos Aires
- Referee: Manuel Sobreira (Uruguay)
- Attendance: 35,000

The 1933 Copa Beccar Varela Final was the final that decided the winner of the 2nd edition of the Argentine domestic cup. The cup was contested by Racing Club (for second consecutive time), and Rosarian Club Central Córdoba. The match was held in River Plate Stadium on February 11, 1934.

The match was suspended after 88 minutes when Racing players abandoned the field in protest of a penalty kick awarded to Central Córdoba. On February 22, the organising body Liga Argentina de Football, awarded the title to Central Córdoba, which won their first national championship.

== Qualified teams ==
Team	Previous finals app.
Racing	**1932**
Central Córdoba	(none)

Bold indicates winning years

== Overview ==
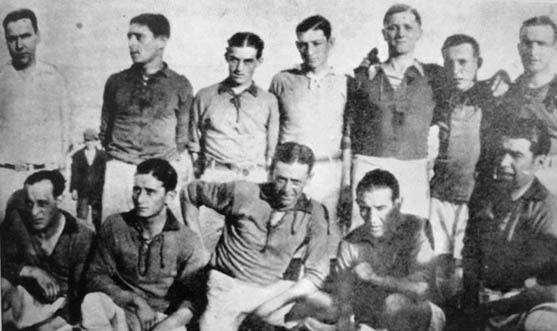
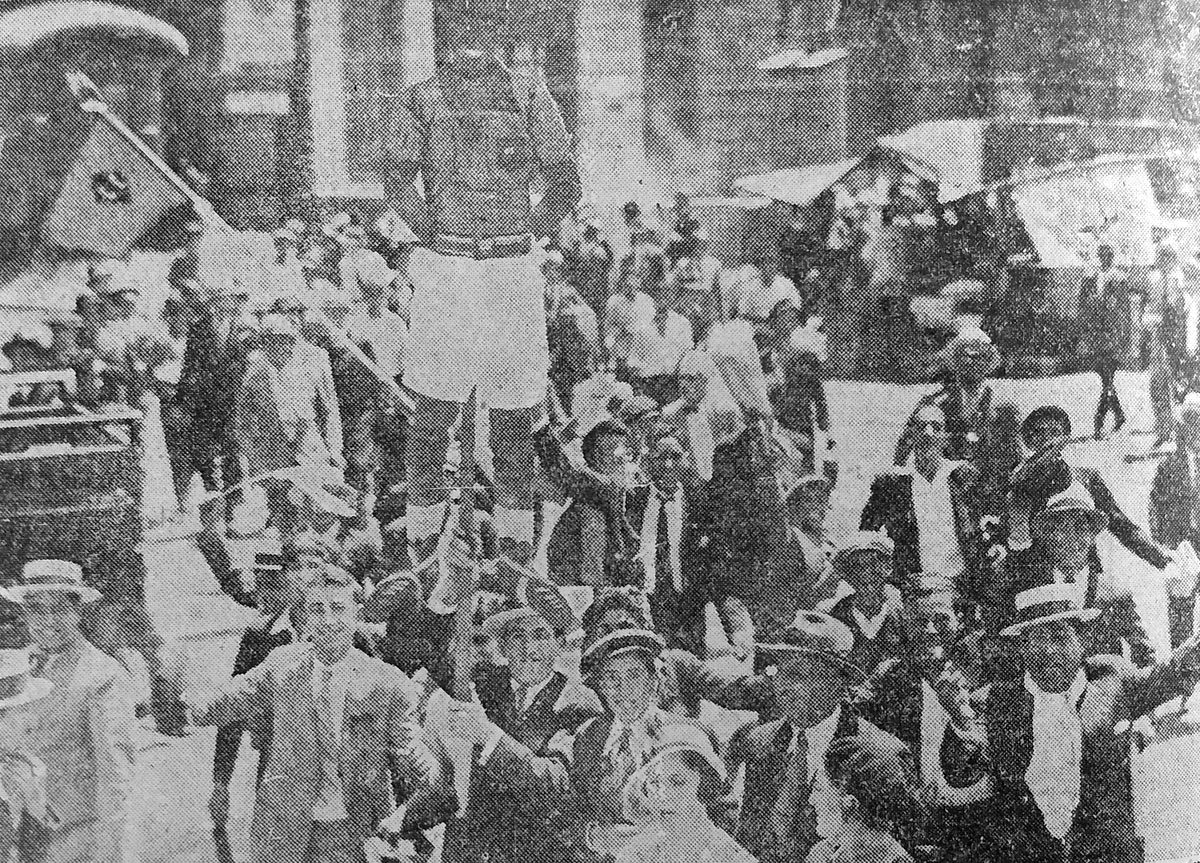
(Left): Team of Central Córdoba that played the final; (right): club supporters holing an image of idol Gabino Sosa celebrate the title in Barrio Tablada

The cup was contested by 30 teams which included clubs participating in the 1933 Primera División organised by dissident association, Liga Argentina de Football (the first professional in Argentina), 6 from Liga Rosarina de Football, 1 from Liga Santafesina, 1 from Liga Cordobesa, and 4 Uruguayan clubs (including Peñarol and Nacional) that gave the cup international status. Teams played a single round-robin before entering to the second stage, which was played in a direct elimination format.

In the first stage, Racing beat Boca Juniors (with a conclusive 7–1), loss to Atlanta 3–4, and beat San Lorenzo 3–0, and Argentinos Juniors 3–0, earning a place in the knockout stage, where the team eliminated Nacional de Rosario (32), Belgrano de Córdoba 5–0, and rival Independiente in the semifinals (3–3, 4–1 playoff)

Central Córdoba beat Nacional (R) 4–1, Tiro Federal 2–1, Newell's Old Boys 2–1, tied with Belgrano 1–1, and lost to Rosario Central 0–1, finishing 1st in the group and therefore qualifying for the second stage. Central Córdoba then eliminated Platense 2–0, Atlanta 2–0, and Gimnasia y Esgrima de Santa Fe 3–2 in the semifinal.

In the final match, held in River Plate Stadium in Recoleta, Buenos Aires, Racing quickly took advantage when Demetrio Conidares scored in the second minute. Tomás Constantini fired back, scoring twice to put Central Córdoba in the lead at 2–1. Racing goalkeeper Juan Botasso then stopped a penalty kick by winger Telmo Collins. In the second half, Vicente Zito scored for Racing forcing a 2–2 tie. With only 2 minutes to play, Uruguayan referee Sobreira awarded a penalty kick to Central Córdoba. Players of Racing abandoned the field in protest against the decision, and the match was then ended abruptly. On February 22, the Liga Argentina awarded points to Central Córdoba therefore the Rosarian team was crowned champion of the competition, winning not only their first Beccar Varela trophy but also their first national title ever.

== Road to the final ==
- H: home
- A: away
- N: neutral

Racing		Round	Central Córdoba (R)	
Opponent	Result	Group stage	Opponent	Result
Boca Juniors	7–1 (A)	Matchday 1	Nacional (R)	4–1 (H)
Atlanta	3–4 (H)	Matchday 2	Tiro Federal	2–1 (H)
San Lorenzo	3–0 (A)	Matchday 3	Belgrano (R)	1–1 (H)
Argentinos Juniors	3–0 (H)	Matchday 4	Newell's Old Boys	2–1 (A)
– (Note: The Racing group had four rounds.)		Matchday 5	Rosario Central	0–1 (H)
Nacional (R)	3–2 (A)	Round of 8	Platense	2–0 (A)
Belgrano (C)	4–0 (H)	Quarter final	Atlanta	2–0 (H)
Independiente	3–3 (N), 4–1 (N) (Note: The first match played at San Lorenzo Stadium, the playoff at River Plate (Alvear y Tagle).)	Semifinal	Gimnasia y Esgrima (SF) (Note: Team from Santa Fe.)	3–2 (N) (Note: Played in Villa Crespo (Atlanta venue?).)

== Match details ==
1933 Copa Beccar Varela Final
February 11, 1934

Racing	2–2 (suspended on 88')	Central Córdoba
Conidares 2'; Zito 53'	Report	Constantino 37', 60'

River Plate, Buenos Aires
Attendance: 35,000
Referee: Manuel Sobreira (Uruguay)

**Racing**	**Central Córdoba**

GK	(Argentina) Juan Botasso
DF	(Argentina) Rodríguez
DF	(Argentina) Arturo Scarcella
MF	(Argentina) Pedro Pompey
MF	(Argentina) Ángel Serramía
MF	(Argentina) Antonio De Mare
FW	(Argentina) Demetrio Conidares
FW	(Argentina) Vicente Zito
FW	(Argentina) Alberto Fassora
FW	(Argentina) Eduardo Leoncio
FW	(Argentina) Roberto Bugueyro
Manager:
(Hungary) Eugenio Medgyessy

GK	(Argentina) Ernesto Funes
DF	(Argentina) Andrés Garramendi
DF	(Argentina) José Busano
MF	(Argentina) Lorenzo D'Uva
MF	(Argentina) Germán Gaitán
MF	(Argentina) Ricardo Solero
FW	(Argentina) Telmo Collins
FW	(Argentina) Tomás Constantino
FW	(Argentina) Gabino Sosa
FW	(Argentina) Antonio Morales
FW	(Argentina) Guillermo Fernández
Manager:
(Argentina) Héctor Di Giovanni

Note: Racing players abandoned the pitch under protest after the referee Sobreira awarded a penalty kick for Central Córdoba. The LAF declared Central Córdoba as champion of the tournament.
