= Arsenio Rodríguez (footballer) =

Paraguayan association football player

Personal information
- Place of birth: Paraguay
- Position: Midfielder

International career
Years	Team	Apps	(Gls)
1921	Paraguay	8	(0)

Arsenio Rodríguez was a Paraguayan footballer who played as a midfielder. He represented the Paraguay national football team during the early years of international football in the country and participated in the 1921 South American Championship, the tournament now known as the Copa América.

== International career ==
Rodríguez was a member of the Paraguay squad that participated in the 1921 South American Championship, held in Buenos Aires, Argentina, from 2 to 30 October 1921. The tournament marked Paraguay's first appearance in the competition, which featured four national teams: Argentina, Brazil, Uruguay and Paraguay.

Paraguay finished fourth in the competition, recording one victory and two defeats.

Rodríguez appeared in two of Paraguay's three matches, playing against Uruguay and Brazil.

=== Match against Uruguay ===
On 9 October 1921, Rodríguez played in Paraguay's opening match of the tournament against Uruguay at the Estadio Sportivo Barracas in Buenos Aires.

Paraguay won the match 2–1, recording a historic victory in its first South American Championship appearance. Gerardo Rivas and Ildefonso López scored for Paraguay, while José Piendibene scored Uruguay's only goal.

Rodríguez played in midfield alongside Isidoro Benítez Casco and Manuel Fleitas Solich. The Paraguayan team was coached by José Durand Laguna.

=== Match against Brazil ===
On 12 October 1921, Rodríguez also played in Paraguay's match against Brazil at the Estadio Sportivo Barracas.

Brazil won 3–0, with Machado scoring twice and Candiota scoring the other goal. Rodríguez was included in Paraguay's midfield during the match.

Paraguay subsequently lost 3–0 to Argentina and finished in fourth place.

=== Later international appearances ===
Rodríguez also represented Paraguay in a friendly match against Uruguay on 2 November 1921, played at the Estadio Gran Parque Central in Montevideo. Uruguay won the match 4–2.

Historical player records credit Rodríguez with eight appearances for the Paraguayan national team without scoring a goal, although the complete dates of his international appearances have not been established.

== Career statistics ==
=== International ===
National team	Appearances	Goals
Paraguay	8	0

== Honours ==
Paraguay

- 1921 South American Championship: Fourth place

== Bibliography ==
- Wołek, Tomasz (1995). Encyklopedia piłkarska FUJI. Copa America. Katowice: Wydawnictwo GiA, p. 22. ISBN 83-902751-2-0.
