= José Nasazzi =

Uruguayan footballer (1901–1968)

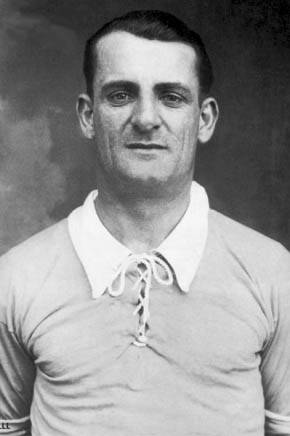
- Nasazzi with the Uruguay national team.

Personal information
- Full name: José Nasazzi Yarza
- Date of birth: 24 March 1901
- Place of birth: Montevideo, Uruguay
- Date of death: 17 June 1968 (aged 67)
- Place of death: Montevideo, Uruguay
- Height: 1.82 m (5 ft 11 1/2 in)
- Position: Defender

Senior career*
Years	Team	Apps	(Gls)
1918–1920	Lito		
1921	Roland Moor		
1922–1933	Bella Vista	322	(17)
1933–1937	Nacional	58	(0)

International career
1923–1936	Uruguay	41	(0)

Managerial career
- 1942–1945: Uruguay
Medal record
Men's football
Representing Uruguay
Olympic Games
Gold medal – first place	1924 Paris	Team
Gold medal – first place	1928 Amsterdam	Team
FIFA World Cup
Winner	1930 Uruguay	Team
Copa América
Winner	1923 Uruguay	Team
Winner	1924 Uruguay	Team
Winner	1926 Chile	Team
Third place	1929 Argentina	Team
Winner	1935 Peru	Team
- * Club domestic league appearances and goals

José Nasazzi Yarza (24 March 1901 – 17 June 1968) was a Uruguayan footballer who played as a right-back or centre-back. He captained his country when they won the inaugural FIFA World Cup in 1930.

== Career ==
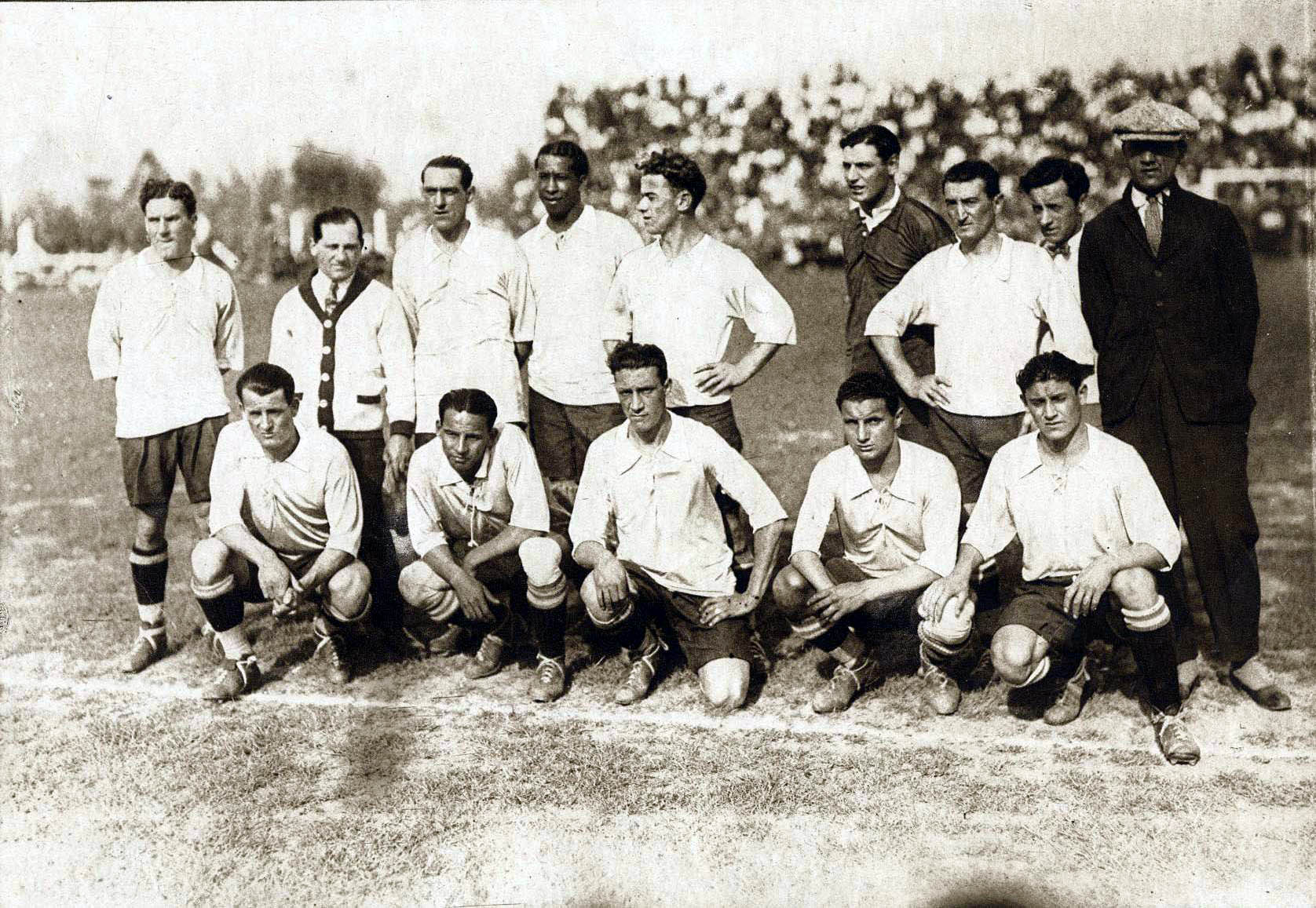
Nasazzi (first from left, at bottom) with the Uruguay team in 1926.

He was born in Bella Vista, Montevideo to Giuseppe, an Italian immigrant from Esino Lario (near Lecco), and María Jacinta Yarza from the Basque Country of Spain.

Nasazzi is regarded by many as Uruguay's greatest ever football player. He was known as El Gran Mariscal ("The Great Marshal"), and had already won the gold medal at the 1924 and 1928 Olympic Games, as well as the South American Championship in 1923, 1924, and 1926, by the time of the first World Cup. On individual level, he was selected as best player at FIFA World Cup 1930 and twice (1923 and 1935) at South American Championship (the predecessor of Copa America).

During the 1930 FIFA World Cup tournament, Uruguay's only serious rivals were their neighbors Argentina. After defeating Peru and Romania in the first round, Uruguay defeated Yugoslavia 6–1 in the semi-finals to set up a final against Argentina. Although his team were 2–1 behind at half-time, Nasazzi rallied his teammates in the second half, leading them to a 4–2 victory and making himself the first captain to lift the Jules Rimet Trophy.

Although Uruguay refused to defend their title in 1934, Nasazzi won the South American Championship again (in 1935), before retiring in 1936 with 41 international appearances. Throughout his career at Nacional, he played 110 matches and scored 10 goals, including friendlies.

== Nasazzi's Baton ==
Nasazzi's Baton is an unofficial title named after José similar to the Unofficial Football World Championship. It is said to have been held by Uruguay after the first World Cup, and subsequently to have been taken over by any team to beat the holders over 90 minutes in a full international match.

== Honours ==
=== Club ===
Lito

- Uruguayan Intermedia: 1917, 1920

Roland Moor

- Uruguayan 3era Extra: 1921

Nacional

- Primera División: 1933 – 1937; 1925: European Tour with Nacional; 1927: US Tour with Nacional;.

=== International ===
Uruguay

- FIFA World Cup: 1930
- Football at the Summer Olympics: 1924, 1928
- South American Championship: 1923, 1924, 1926, 1935

=== Individual ===
- Best player at the South American Championship: 1923, 1935
- FIFA World Cup Golden Ball: 1930
- France Football's World Cup Top-100 1930–1990, 56th: 1994
- IFFHS South American Footballer of the Century, 26th: 1999
- World Soccer's 100 Greatest Footballers of All Time, 75th: 1999
- RSSSF Uruguay All-Time Team: 1999
- Copa América Historical Dream Team: 2011
- IFFHS Uruguayan Men's Dream Team
