= Francisco Arellano =

Chilean footballer (1896–1976)

Personal information
- Date of birth: 6 December 1896
- Place of birth: Santiago, Chile
- Date of death: 6 May 1976 (aged 79)
- Place of death: Santiago, Chile
- Position: Midfielder

International career
| Years | Team | Apps | (Gls) |
| 1924 | Chile | 3 | (0) |

Francisco Arellano (6 December 1896 – 6 May 1976) was a Chilean footballer. He played in three matches for the Chile national football team in 1924. He was also part of Chile's squad for the 1924 South American Championship, and for the 1928 Summer Olympics, but he did not play in any matches in the latter.
