= Antenor Amable =

Chilean footballer

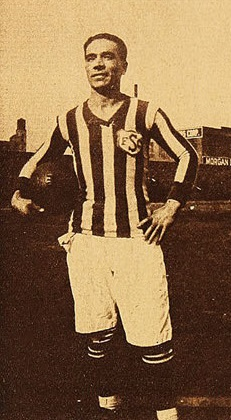

Personal information
- Date of birth: 2 June 1900
- Position: Defender

International career
Years	Team	Apps	(Gls)
1924	Chile	3	(0)

Antenor Amable (born 2 June 1900, date of death unknown) was a Chilean footballer. He played in three matches for the Chile national football team in 1924. He was also part of Chile's squad for the 1924 South American Championship.
