= Ángel Barlocco =

Uruguayan footballer

Personal information
- Date of birth: 14 December 1899
- Position: Forward

International career
Years	Team	Apps	(Gls)
1924	Uruguay	2	(0)

Ángel Barlocco (born 14 December 1899, date of death unknown) was a Uruguayan footballer. He played in two matches for the Uruguay national football team in 1924. He was also part of Uruguay's squad for the 1924 South American Championship.
