= Estadio Gabino Sosa =

Football stadium in Rosario, Argentina

Coordinates: 32°58′14.55″S 60°38′10.60″W

Gabino Sosa Stadium
- Estadio Gabino Sosa
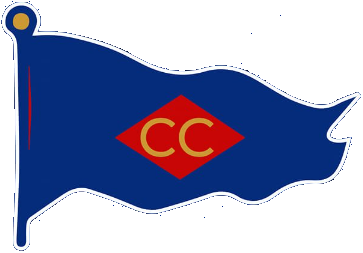

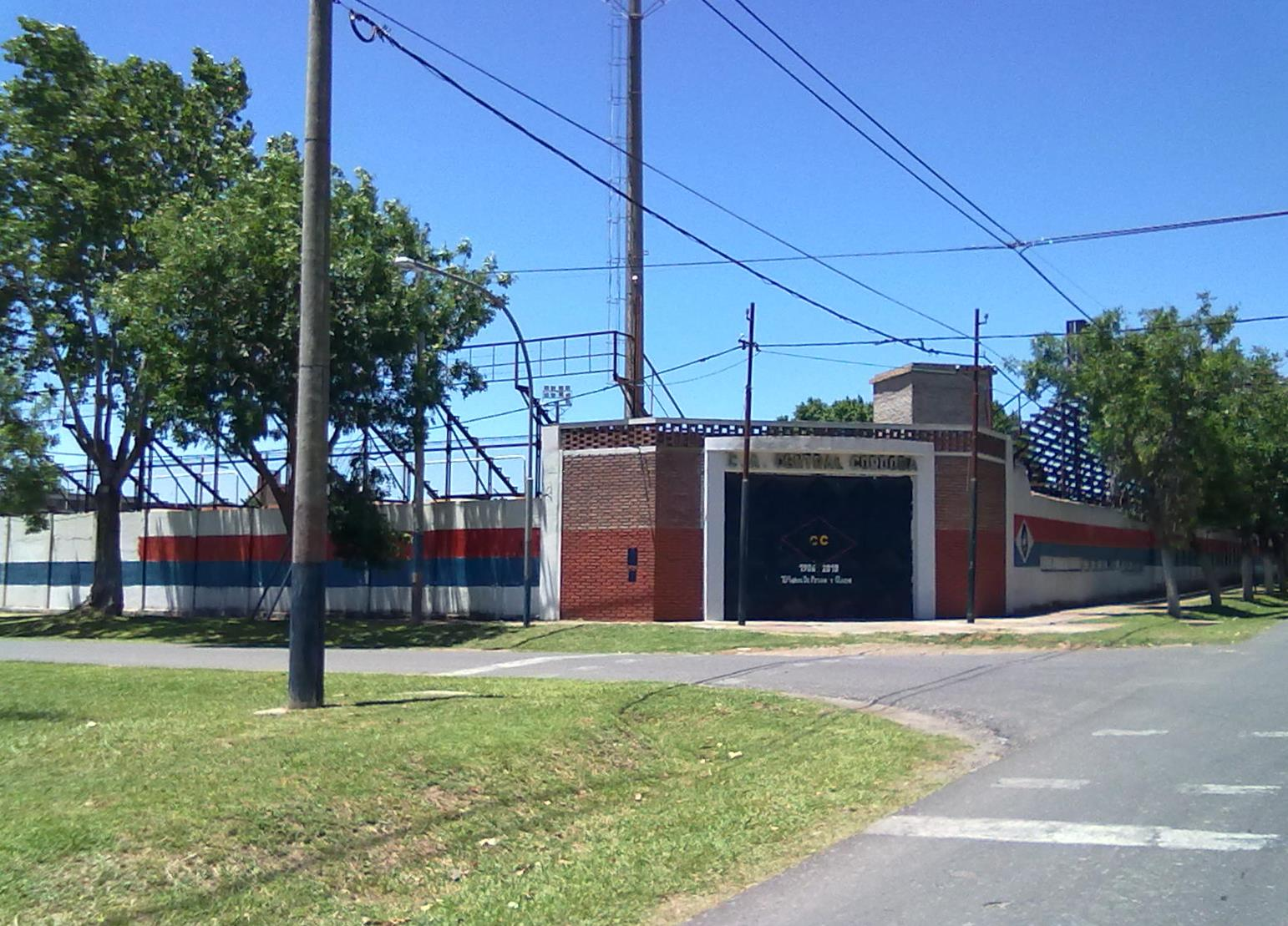
- Entrance to the stadium in 2012
- Interactive map of Gabino Sosa Stadium
- Address: J.M. de Rosas y Virasoro; Rosario; Argentina
- Owner: C.A. Central Córdoba
- Capacity: 10,000
- Type: Stadium
- Surface: Grass

Construction
- Opened: 1907; 119 years ago
- Expanded: 1920, 1931, 1959

Website
- centralcordoba.com.ar/estadio

Estadio Gabino Sosa is a football stadium located in the city of Rosario, Santa Fe, Argentina. It is owned and operated by C.A. Central Córdoba. Opened in 1907, the stadium has a capacity of 10,000 people.

In November 1969, the stadium was named after former Central Córdoba and Argentina national team player Gabino Sosa, highly regarded as one of the best players in Central Córdoba history.

== History ==
The first Central Córdoba field was located on Boulevard Argentino and 25 de Diciembre (today, 'Juan Manuel de Rosas'). In 1907, the club moved to their current location on Rosas and Virasoro streets.

As the club had a close relationship with the owners of Córdoba Central Railway (Ferrocarril Central Córdoba) due to most of their members were employees of the FCCC, the company allowed the club to use a land where a new stadium was built. In 1916, both parties signed an agreement that established the club would pay a rent for the land. In the 1920s, the club built the first grandstands in the stadium, placed on the east side.

In 1931 a new metallic grandstand was built in the stadium. It was 100 m wide and 6 m high, and replaced the old east side stands. Works were carried out by the Chaina & Cía. company, and were completed in only seven days. In 1958, Central Córdoba acquired the land to Ferrocarriles Argentinos, owner of it after the Argentine railway system was nationalised in 1948.

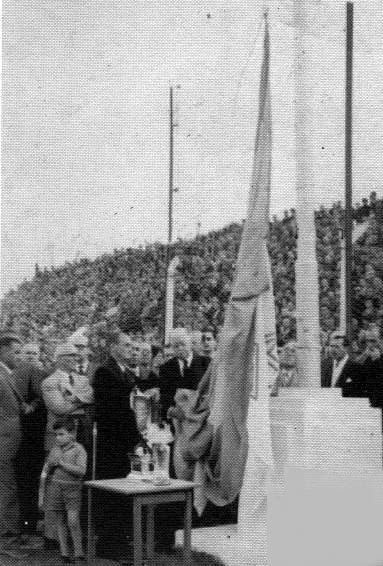
Ceremony of re-inauguration of the stadium after the refurbishments made in 1959

When Central Córdoba won the 1957 Primera B championship and were promoted to Primera División, the Argentine Football Association (AFA) forced the club to expand the capacity of their stadium as a requirement to host matches in the top division. Therefore, in 1958 Central Córdoba built two new grandstands (on the north and south sides) while the goal posts were moved to the east and west sides to fit the AFA's rules.

The club inaugurated a lighting system in a friendly match vs Banfield that Central Córdoba won 5–4 in January 1942. Nonetheless, only friendly matches (usually pre-season tournaments) were played by night at the stadium during the subsequent decades. In 1994 the original wooden towers were replaced by concrete ones. During the Central Córdoba's stay in Primera B Nacional, the squad played several night matches.

In October 2023, the lighting system of the stadium was used again after a five-year hiatus. It was possible thanks to a donation of neighbour club Newell's Old Boys, which gave Central Córdoba forty lamps that had been replaced in their own venue, Marcelo Bielsa Stadium. Central Córdoba's members, supporters and executives also gave money to help with costs. The last match played at night was in April 2018.
