= Karlovich =

Karlovich is a Russian-language surname. It should be distinguished from the East Slavic patronymic with exactly same spelling, derived from the given name Karl (given name). The difference is that the patronymic is pronounce with the stress of the first syllable, but in the surname the stress is ion the second syllable. Notable people with this name include:

- Anastasiya Karlovich (born 1982), Ukrainian chess grandmaster

Karlovich may also be an alternative Anglicisation, or a phonetic misspelling, of the following surnames:

- Carlovich, the surname of Argentine football player Tomás Carlovich
- Karlović, a Croatian surname
- Karłowicz, a Polish surname

== See also ==
- Karlowitz (disambiguation)
- Karlovica
- Karlovice (disambiguation)
