= Karlović =

Karlović (pronounced [kâːrloʋitɕ]) is a Croatian surname. Notable people with the surname include:

- Ivo Karlović, Croatian tennis player
- Ivan Karlović, Croatian nobleman
- Mario Karlović, Croatian Australian soccer player
- Tomás Carlovich, Argentine football player of Croatian descent

== See also ==
- Karlovich
