= Germán Reyes =

Chilean footballer (1902–1970)

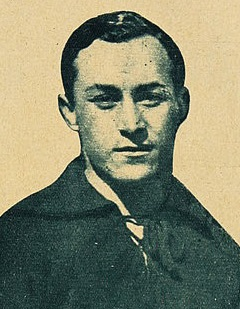

Personal information
- Full name: Germán Reyes Opazo
- Date of birth: 20 November 1902
- Date of death: 21 July 1970 (aged 67)
- Position: Midfielder

International career
Years	Team	Apps	(Gls)
1924	Chile	3	(0)

Germán Reyes (20 November 1902 – 21 July 1970) was a Chilean footballer. He played in three matches for the Chile national football team in 1924. He was also part of Chile's squad for the 1924 South American Championship, and for the 1928 Summer Olympics, but he did not play in any matches in the latter.
