= Karlovice =

Karlovice may refer to places in the Czech Republic:

- Karlovice (Bruntál District), a municipality and village in the Moravian-Silesian Region
- Karlovice (Semily District), a municipality and village in the Liberec Region
- Karlovice (Zlín District), a municipality and village in the Zlín Region
- Karlovice, a village and part of Kostelec u Holešova in the Zlín Region
- Karlovice, a village and part of Tísek in the Moravian-Silesian Region
- Karlovice, a hamlet and part of Úžice (Kutná Hora District) in the Central Bohemian Region
- Velké Karlovice, a municipality and village in the Zlín Region
