= Otto Ernst =

Chilean footballer (1898-1940)

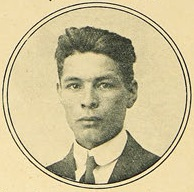

Personal information
- Date of birth: 7 September 1898
- Date of death: 28 February 1940 (aged 41)
- Position: Defender

International career
Years	Team	Apps	(Gls)
1913–1924	Chile	4	(0)

Otto Ernst (7 September 1898 – 28 February 1940) was a Chilean footballer. He played in four matches for the Chile national football team from 1913 to 1924. He was also part of Chile's squad for the 1924 South American Championship.
