= Tomás Carlovich =

Argentine footballer and coach (1946–2020)

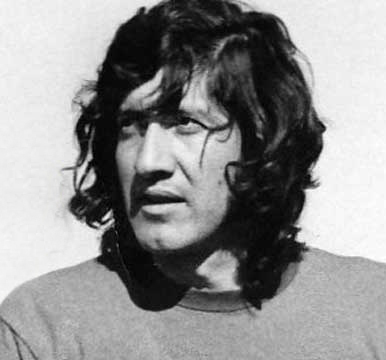
- Carlovich with Central Córdoba, c. 1975

Personal information
- Full name: Tomás Felipe Carlovich
- Date of birth: 19 April 1946
- Place of birth: Rosario, Argentina
- Date of death: 8 May 2020 (aged 74)
- Place of death: Rosario, Argentina
- Height: 1.83 m (6 ft 0 in)
- Position: Midfielder

Youth career
- 1960–1964: Rosario Central

Senior career*
Years	Team	Apps	(Gls)
1965	Rosario Central	2	(0)
1965–1969	→ Sporting of Bigand (loan)	70	(10)
1970–1971	Flandria	17	(2)
1972–1975	Central Córdoba	82	(8)
1975–1976	Independiente Rivadavia	15	(3)
1977	Colón de Santa Fe	15	(1)
1978	Central Córdoba	12	(1)
1978–1979	Deportivo Maipú	13	(3)
1979	Andes Talleres	17	(4)
1980–1983	Central Córdoba	150	(17)
1984	Juventud de Pergamino	10	(3)
1985	Newell's Old Boys of Cañada de Gómez	17	(1)
1986	Central Córdoba	12	(2)
1987–88	Argentino of Monte Maíz	40	(13)
Total		472+	(68+)
- * Club domestic league appearances and goals

Tomás Felipe Carlovich (19 April 1946 – 8 May 2020), nicknamed El Trinche ("The Maradona that never was"), was an Argentine professional football player and coach. His position on the field was central midfielder, playing for several clubs although he is mostly associated with Central Córdoba, where he became an idol and the most representative player of the club along with Gabino Sosa. Due to his ball control and dribbling ability, many people saw Carlovich as a pure representative of creole football, although he had played only a few matches in the top division of Argentine football. Carlovich also had a brief stint as coach in Central Córdoba, although he stated that he was not interested in taking over the senior squad again after resigning.

== Early life and non-League career ==
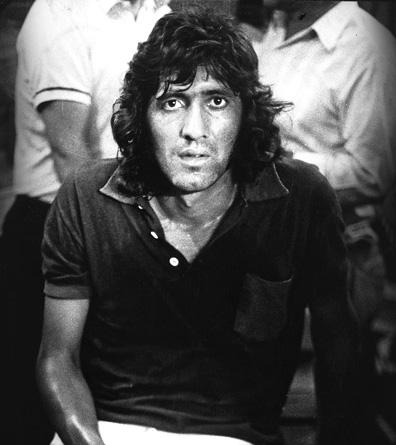
Carlovich with Central Córdoba in 1973

Carlovich grew up in Belgrano neighborhood, Rosario. Carlovich (Croatian: Karlović) was of Croatian descent: his father, Mario Karlović, was an immigrant from Zagreb. Once settled in San Francisco de Santa Fe he met Carlovich's mother, Elvira Vega; he was the last of seven siblings (three girls and four boys). He started in the youth ranks of Rosario Central in 1960s decade he played two matches for the senior team, and in 1965 he was briefly loaned to Sporting of Bigand, where he won the Southern Sports League championship. but he received most recognition during his tenure in Central Córdoba. Playing for Central Córdoba, Carlovich won the promotions Primera C to Primera B 1973 and 1982. He was in Central Córdoba in four stages: 1972–1975, 1978, 1980–1983 and 1986, playing nine seasons, and scoring 28 goals in 236 games.

In 1976 he played for Independiente Rivadavia won the promotions to Primera Nacional. In one of the friendly matches, the team defeated Italian AC Milan with a score of 4–1. In 1977 he played for Colón de Santa Fe in top League Argentine Primera División led the team to a 5th place finish, the highest in his career. In 1978 he played for Central Córdoba Played 2 matches in the Argentina championship. In 1978–1979 he played for Deportivo Maipú. In 1979, the team defeated Inter Milan with a score of 3–1 in a friendly match. In 1979 he played for Andes Talleres. In one of the friendly matches, the team defeated AC Milan with a score of 3–2.

Furthermore, in 1984 he went through Juventud de Pergamino and, in 1985, he played for Newell's Old Boys of Cañada de Gómez, an entity belonging to the Cañadense Football League. He retired in October 1988, at the age of 42, in Argentino of Monte Maíz.

=== The historical "forward and back nutmeg" ===
During a match between Central Córdoba and Talleres de Remedios de Escalada, a supporter encouraged Carlovich to make a double nutmeg, moving the ball first forward, then back. This request was immediately fulfilled by "El Trinche", causing a huge ovation from his fans in the grandstand. This nutmeg would be repeated many times by Carlovich during his career.

A specialist in pipes, one of his characteristic plays was the so-called "double pipe", by which he passed the ball between the opponent's legs in two consecutive moments, snubbing the same player twice.

=== Legend of the 1974 consecration ===
The last match as a preparation for the 1974 World Cup found the Argentina national football team going to Rosario to play a friendly game against a squad formed exclusively by players born in that city. Some of the Rosarian players were prominent footballers, such as Mario Zanabria, Daniel Killer, Carlos Aimar and Carlovich as well.

At the end of the first half, the team from Rosario led 3–0. The supremacy of the local team was so big that the Argentina national team coach, Vladislao Cap, asked for his colleague to exclude Carlovich for the second half, and this is what finally happened. The final score was 3–1

In 1976, he was called up to the Argentina national team for one of the friendly matches before the 1978 World Cup, but did not arrive at the team's location. Because he went fishing and the water level rose, he was unable to attend.

== Style of play and temperament ==
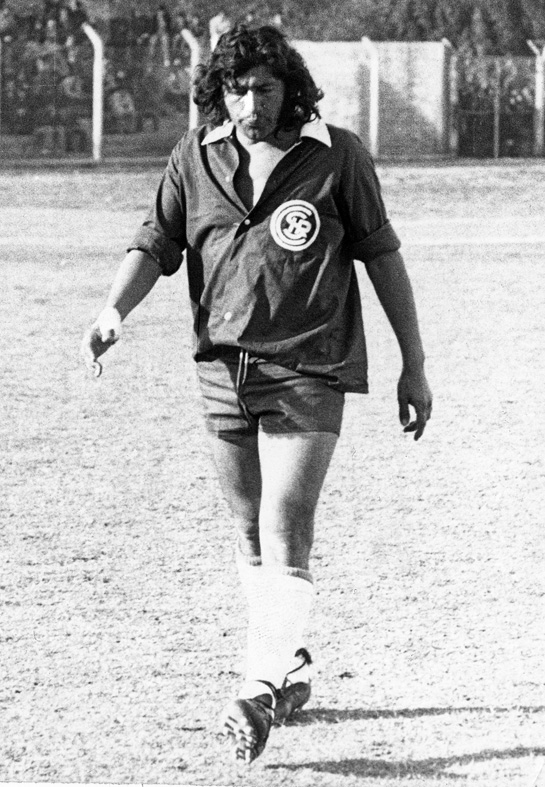
Carlovich playing for Independiente Rivadavia in 1976

A left-footed central midfielder who typically wore the number 5 jersey, Carlovich was noted for his technical skills. During the friendly match against the Argentine selection in 1974, he inflicted a bridge on Francisco Sá. A claim was made that he invented the double small bridge. El Trinche himself wanted to put things into perspective. “Here in Rosario, there are tons of inventions around me. But they are false. People in Rosario love to tell stories. I would have made small bridges going back and forth (the famous doble caño), but it’s not that important." It became a signature throughout his football career. El Trinche was a subjectively tall and slow player. Those who have seen him play often compare him to Diego Maradona for his ball-control-keeping skills, to Fernando Redondo for his defensive focus, and Juan Román Riquelme for his presence on the pitch. He was a deep playmaker, able to cross the ball 40 yards with precision.

The prestigious sports magazine El Grafico described him like this: He had his style: he was an elegant, virtuous and somewhat disdainful central midfielder. He walked slowly, but with reasoning inversely proportional to his walk. Carlovich is something like the greatest exponent of the lyrical arc of Argentine football. According to the record, the playing style during the peak period in 1974, continued in the 1983 documentary. Because he played most of his career in lower categories of Argentine football (he gave up fame and the first division to continue playing with his friends), GloboEsporte.com defined him as "The best Argentine player that the world hasn't seen".

== Personal life and health ==
After hanging up his boots, he worked as a construction worker until he retired and was quite poor. In 2002, the municipality of Rosario named him an Illustrious Athlete, which allowed him to collect the only money he contributed monthly in the house he shared with his wife Bruno and María-Laura two of his daughter at that time, until he began laying floors with one of his siblings. His tribulations came from before, when severe pain began to afflict him that turned out to be the product of coxofemoral osteoporosis. Friends and relatives mobilized and, with the collaboration of Rosario mayor Miguel Lifschitz, he was able to get a prosthesis on his right hip in October 2005.

In 2011, the program Informe Robinson on the Spanish radio station Canal Plus made a special program about him. During that report, Jorge Valdano revealed that the former Rosario player and technical director Marcelo Bielsa attended Central Córdoba games, for four uninterrupted years, to see him play. Furthermore, in said report, it was mentioned that Trinche was once considered a reinforcement for the New York Cosmos, but that Pelé would have prevented him from being hired.

In 2019, a play titled El Trinche, the best soccer player in the world, written by Jorge Eines and José Ramón Fernández, inspired by his legacy, was presented at the Cooperation Cultural Center in the city of Buenos Aires.

== Death ==
On 6 May 2020, Carlovich was assaulted and beaten by a young man who stole his bicycle. Carlovich fell and hit his head on the ground, taken to hospital and died two days later On 8 May 2020. Juan Ariel Maidana, 32, was arrested by the police as the alleged perpetrator of the attack, and he was remanded in preventive detention. After due judicial process, he was sentenced to 33 years in prison for the crime of homicide. On May 10, he was farewelled at the Central Córdoba stadium by a crowd of fans who violated the ban on gatherings issued in connection with the SARS-CoV-2 virus pandemic.

== Recognition ==
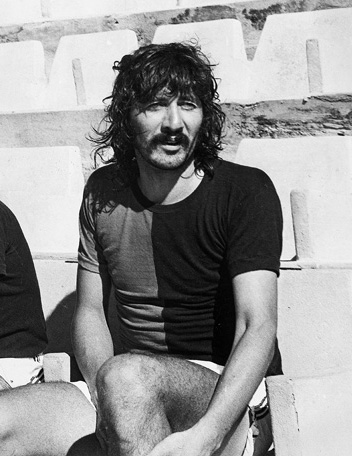
Carlovich with Colón de Santa Fe in 1977

El Trinche was widely recognized, nationally and international. The lack of audiovisual documentation of his matches has meant that, through oral transmission, his figure has reached mythical records.

He is considered one of the most talented players of his time, despite the fact that he spent almost his entire career in the lower divisions of Argentina. It is believed that Karlovic did not fully realize his talent, as he did not want to leave his hometown and country. He also had problems with discipline - he missed games and training. "The Maradona who never was" - this is how the media writes about him. The athlete's character also hindered his career in big football: "an introverted and hermit personality who disdained any idea of success." Karlovic himself said: “I had no other ambitions than to play football.”

Carlovich was even compared with Diego Maradona when some referred to him as "the Maradona that never was" because of his bohemian style of life his refusal Famous teams like Boca Juniors and his refusal to play in clubs outside Argentina. famous overseas teams like. AC Milan, Inter Milan and Paris Saint-Germain tried to sign him, but Carlovich declined the offers. At the end of his career, Brazilian star Pelé tried to convince him to play for the New York Cosmos but he also refused.

Carlovich is considered one of the best Argentine football players ever. José Pékerman he had no hesitation in choosing Carlovich as "the most wonderful footballer I've ever seen."; César Luis Menotti said, "Carlovich is one of those kids whose unique toy has been a ball since they were born. Watching him playing football was impressive."; Carlos Timoteo Griguol said: "He has outstanding technical ability. When you mark him, he disappears everywhere and the ball disappears with him". Daniel Passarella said about Carlovich: "When I played for Sarmiento de Junín, in the lower leagues, I fell in love with Carlovich. He was the best player I saw before I reached the top division. A star, I would have liked to be like him." in 1993 Diego Maradona, when arriving at Newell's Old Boys and after being defined by a journalist as "the best footballer", replied: "The best footballer has already played in Rosario, and his name is Carlovich". In February 2020, when Gimnasia y Esgrima La Plata went to Rosario to play Rosario Central, Maradona met Carlovich and expressed his admiration again, saying to him "you were better than me" before that Mágico González.

== Legacy in his own words ==
"Many things about me were told, but most of them were not true. The real thing is I never liked being so far from my neighborhood, my parents' house, the bar I used to go, my friends, and 'the Vasco' Artola, who teach me how to hit the ball when I was a boy.

"Sometimes I sat on the ball during the matches, but I did it just to have a break and not to mock the rivals on the field. My style of playing football was very modest, as my own life was, despite the sins of youth I could have committed".

"The most beautiful gift that football gave me were Central Córdoba and Independiente Rivadavia; I would define them as 'the two loves of my life'. In both teams I have played the best years of my career which totalises 16 years as a professional. With the 'Charrúas' I obtained two Second Division championships, in 1973 and 1982. The club administrators paid me a special bonus by nutmeg and double bonus by double nutmeg. The fans used to encourage me from the grandstand shouting like this: 'Go Trinche, make a double nutmeg'".

"When Diego (Maradona) came to Rosario, some Central Córdoba executives emphasized on me so much to go see him at the hotel, that I said 'well, let's go'. I was 20 meters away from where Diego –surrounded by 15 or 20 people– was... Suddenly he appeared in front of me, gave me a hug and began talking non-stop. He even signed me a t-shirt and put on it for "Trinche the only one who is greater than me". The only thing I could answer is 'Diego, now I can leave this world in peace, you were the greatest player I saw in my life. Unusual things happen to me'.

== Honours ==
Sporting of Bigand

- Southern Sports League Championship: 1965

Central Córdoba

- Primera B Metropolitana Northern zone: 1974
- Primera C Metropolitana: 1973
  - Primera C Play-offs: 1982

Independiente Rivadavia

- Primera A de Liga Mendocina: 1976

Individual

- Central Córdoba player of the season: 1973, 1974, 1981, 1982
- Independiente Rivadavia player of the season: 1976
- Central Córdoba Hall of Fame: 2020

== Bibliography ==
- Caravario, Alejandro (2019). "Trinche: un viaje por la leyenda del genio secreto del fútbol". Planeta. ISBN 9789504964827.
