= José Olguín (footballer) =

Chilean footballer (1903–1991)

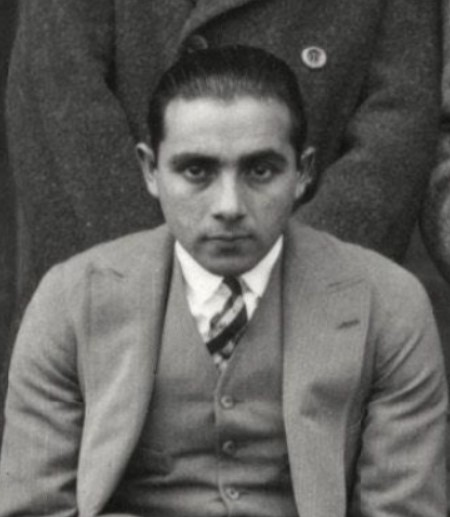

Personal information
- Full name: José Miguel Olguín Farías
- Date of birth: 2 August 1903
- Place of birth: La Ligua, Chile
- Date of death: 16 November 1991 (aged 88)
- Place of death: Santiago, Chile

International career
Years	Team	Apps	(Gls)
- Chile

José Miguel Olguín Farías (2 August 1903 – 16 November 1991) was a Chilean footballer. He competed in the men's tournament at the 1928 Summer Olympics.
