= Kostelec u Holešova =

- Municipality
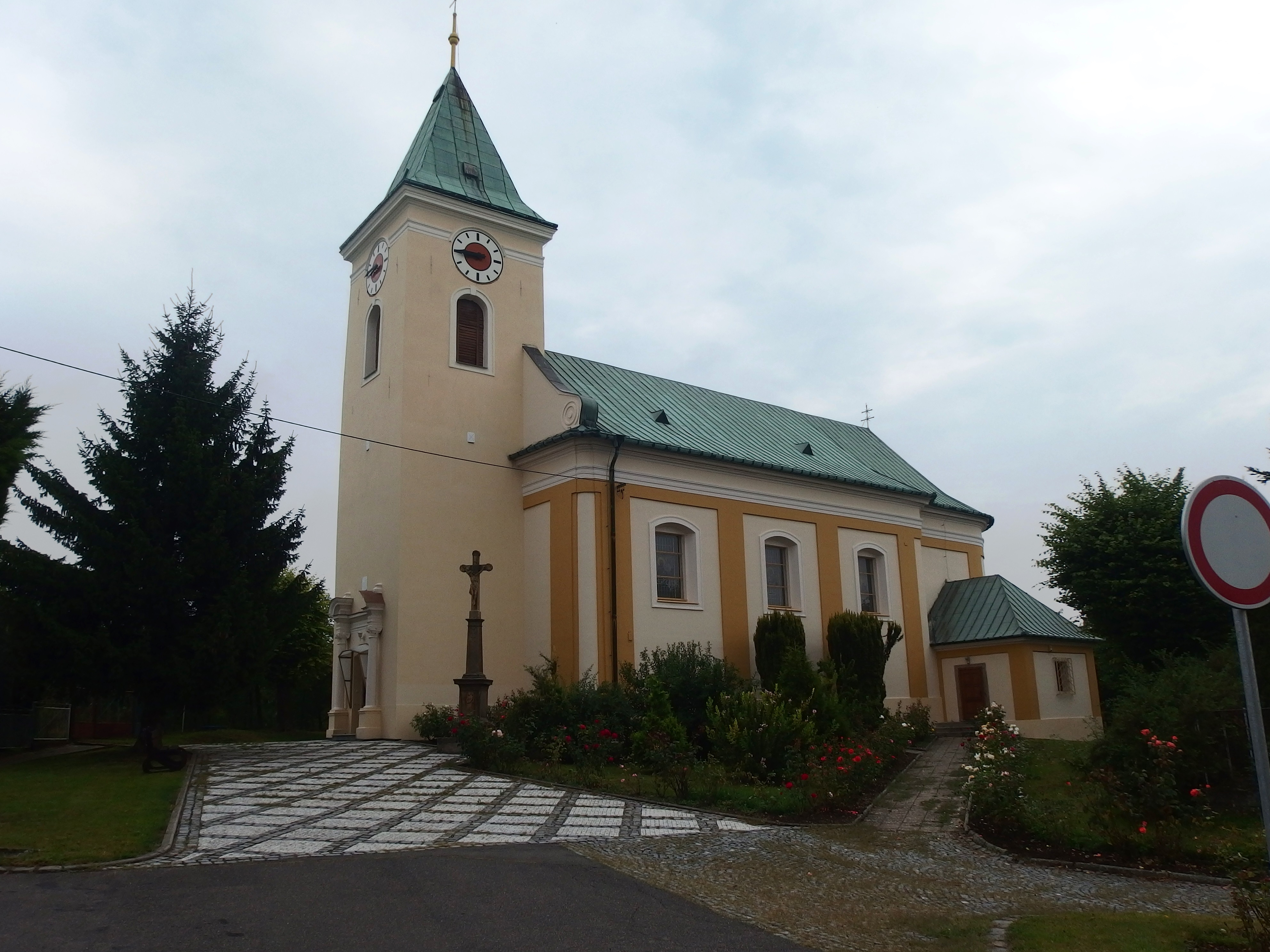
- Church of Saints Peter and Paul

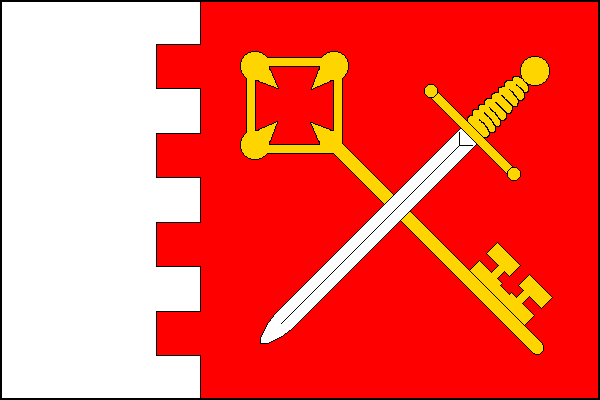
- Flag Coat of arms

- Location in the Czech Republic
- Coordinates: 49°22′29″N 17°30′44″E
- Country: Czech Republic
- Region: Zlín
- District: Kroměříž
- First mentioned: 1131

Area
  - Total: 15.03 km^{2} (5.80 sq mi)
- Elevation: 260 m (850 ft)

Population (2026-01-01)
  - Total: 979
  - Density: 65.1/km^{2} (169/sq mi)
- Time zone: UTC+1 (CET)
  - Summer (DST): UTC+2 (CEST)
- Postal code: 768 43
- Website: www.kostelecuholesova.cz

Kostelec u Holešova is a municipality and village in Kroměříž District in the Zlín Region of the Czech Republic. It has about 1,000 inhabitants.

Kostelec u Holešova lies approximately 13 kilometres (8 mi) north-east of Kroměříž, 19 km (12 mi) north-west of Zlín, and 237 km (147 mi) east of Prague.

== Administrative division ==
Kostelec u Holešova consists of two municipal parts (in brackets population according to the 2021 census):

- Kostelec u Holešova (860)
- Karlovice (122)

== Demographics ==
Historical population
Year	Pop.	±%
1869	993	—
1880	1,053	+6.0%
1890	1,074	+2.0%
1900	1,137	+5.9%
1910	1,199	+5.5%
1921	1,137	−5.2%
1930	1,099	−3.3%
1950	1,039	−5.5%
1961	1,058	+1.8%
1970	964	−8.9%
1980	875	−9.2%
1991	913	+4.3%
2001	976	+6.9%
2011	966	−1.0%
2021	982	+1.7%
Source: Censuses

== Notable people ==
- Otakar Odložilík (1899–1973), historian and archivist
