= Club Atlético Belgrano (Rosario) =

Belgrano (Rosario)
- Full name: Club Atlético Belgrano
- Nicknames: Papero, Celeste
- Founded: June 17, 1911; 115 years ago
- League: Asociación Rosarina
- 1979: ?
colours

Club Atlético Belgrano is an Argentine sports club based in Rosario, Santa Fe. Its main activity was football, with its senior team competing in Asociación Rosarina de Fùtbol (successor of defunct Liga Rosarina, where Belgrano played as well), until 1980 when the club disaffiliated from it.

Nowadays, Belgrano hosts a variety of sports and social activities such as basketball, futsal, roller skating, Arabic dance, ballet, yoga, and gymnastics (for aged people). The club is mainly focused on bringing low income people to the club, through a cheap fee that allowed them to use the facilities and practising sports and other activities offered there. By 2016, the club had 350 members.Its sky-blue color is due to its namesake, Belgrano of Córdoba.

== History ==
In the first decade of the 20th century, employees of the Central Market and North Market of Rosario used to play football just for fun. They soon decided to establish a club so on June 17, 1911, "Centro Recreativo Mercado Central" was founded. The club affiliated to Liga Rosarina, playing in the second division changing its name to "Club atlético Belgrano". In that division, Belgrano won the "Copa de la Torre" beating Rosario Atlético.

In 1915 the squad promoted to the LRF first division to play Copa Nicasio Vila (the main league championship in Rosario by then), won by Belgrano in 1924 after beating Tiro Federal in the final with a goal by forward Silvio Bearzotti.

As the origins of the club were related to the Central Market (marketplace), they were nicknamed paperos (in Spanish, an expression referring to people who sell potatoes).

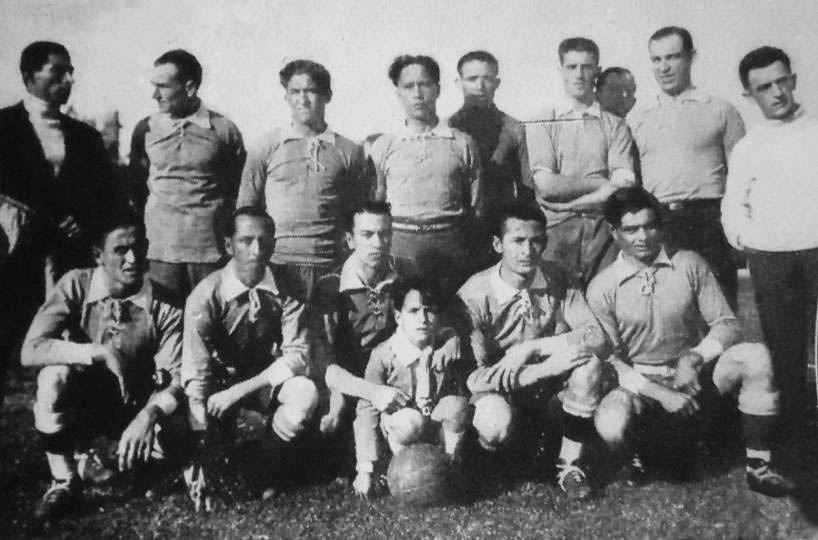
Team of Belgrano that played v Boca Juniors in 1926

As representative of LRF, Belgrano earned right to play the 1924 Copa Ibarguren v Boca Juniors (Primera División champion). The final was delayed and played in May 1926, when Belgrano was defeated 3–2.

When the first professional league was created in Argentina in 1931 and LRF folded, Belgrano was a founding member of Asociación Rosarina, established that same year to organise professional competitions. During those years, Belgrano made irregular campaigns. The highlight of the 1930s was the raise of forward Rinaldo Martino, who would be a notable player in San Lorenzo de Almagro and the Argentina national team in the 1940s, achieving a successful career.

When Rosario Central and Newell's joined AFA to play in 1939 Argentine Primera División, the Rosario regional competitions lost importance. Teams affiliated to ARF registered to "Torneo del Litoral", with Belgrano merging with Club Atlético Provincial to play the tournament, but the team finished 6th of 8. Belgrano returned to ARF to play the "Torneo Gobernador Luciano Molinas", the first division, contesting that championship until 1980, when the club disaffiliated from ARF leaving the professional activity.

== Colors ==
The first shirt of the club (still under the "C.R. Mercado Central" name) was black; when it changed to "C.A. Belgrano", light blue was adopted as club's color. That shirt was worn until 1918 when the club switched to a dark blue with thin stripes shirt. That model remained until 1923, returning to the traditional light blue that has remained up to present days.

1911	1912–17	1918–23	1924–pres.

== Notable players ==
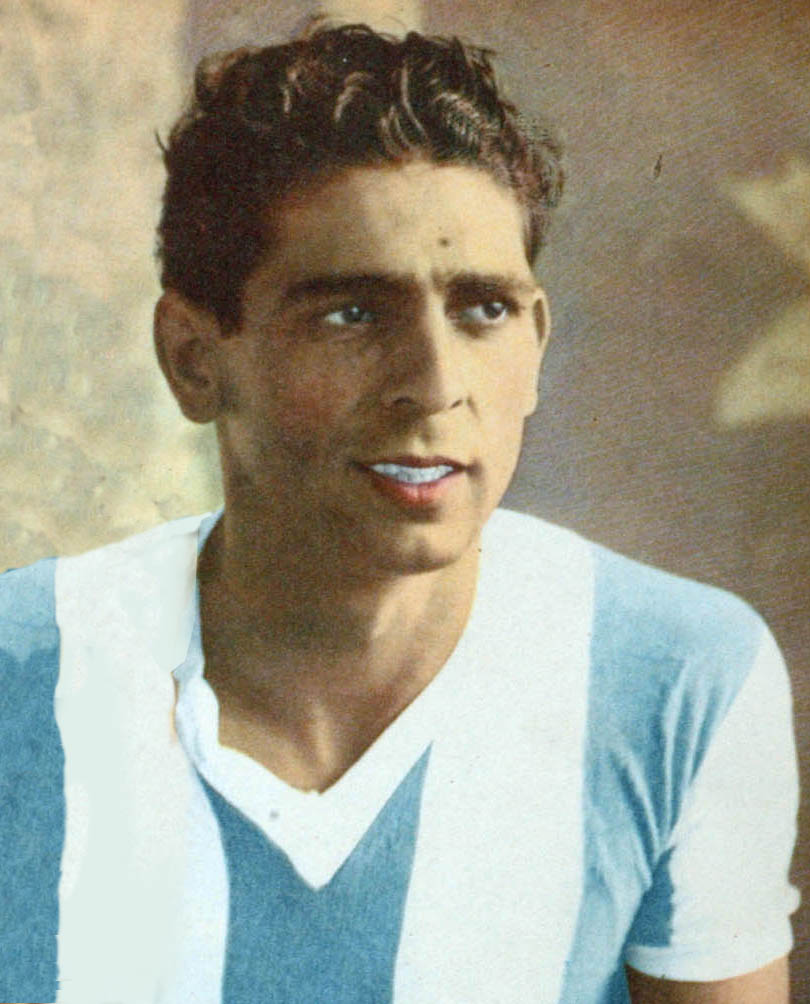
Rinaldo Martino played three years for Belgrano before signing for San Lorenzo de Almagro.

- Rinaldo Martino (1937–40): the most notable player of Belgrano, traded to San Lorenzo de Almagro in 1940 for m$n 13,000. San Lorenzo's main interest was Waldino Aguirre, player of Central Còrdoba, but the match where he had to play was suspended. As a result, San Lorenzo representatives went to Belgrano's field, where they were astonished by Martino's playing and skills and decided to hire him.
- Florindo Bearzotti: Centre back and captain of the 1924 champion, was called up by Argentina for the 1920, 1921, and 1924 Copa América, playing a total of 14 matches with the national side.
- Silvio Bearzotti: Top scorer of the club during the 1920s, scored the only goal of the 1924 title.

== Honours ==
=== Regional ===
- Copa Nicasio Vila
  - Winners (1): 1924
