= Pedro Zingone =

Uruguayan footballer

Personal information
- Full name: Pedro Antonio Zingone Guarzo
- Date of birth: 20 July 1898
- Place of birth: Montevideo, Uruguay
- Date of death: 16 August 1929 (aged 31)
- Place of death: Montevideo, Uruguay

Senior career*
| Years | Team | Apps | (Gls) |
- Lito

International career
| 1923–1924 | Uruguay | 4 | (1) |
Medal record
Men's football
Representing Uruguay
Olympic Games
| Gold medal – first place | 1924 Paris | Team |
South American Championship
| Winner | 1923 Uruguay |
| Winner | 1924 Uruguay |
- * Club domestic league appearances and goals

Pedro Zingone (20 July 1898 – 16 August 1929) was a Uruguayan footballer.

Zingone was a member of the Uruguay squad which won gold medal at 1924 Olympics, but he did not play in any matches. He was also part of national team which won South American Championship in 1923 and 1924. He played club football for Lito.

== Honours ==
=== Country ===
Uruguay

- South American Championship Winner: 1923, 1924
- Olympic Games Gold medallist: 1924
