= Gabino Sosa (footballer) =

Argentine footballer

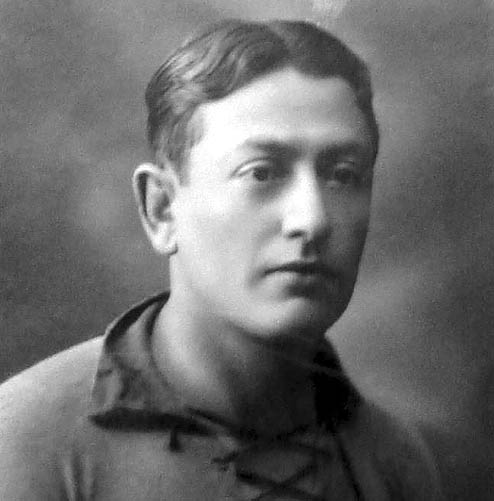

Personal information
- Date of birth: October 4, 1899
- Place of birth: Rosario, Argentina
- Date of death: March 3, 1971 (aged 71)
- Place of death: Rosario, Argentina
- Position: Midfielder

Youth career
- Central Córdoba

Senior career*
Years	Team	Apps	(Gls)
1913–1938	Central Córdoba		

International career
1921–1927	Argentina	15	(6)
- * Club domestic league appearances and goals as of October 2008

Gabino Sosa (4 October 1899 – 3 March 1971) was an Argentine football forward who spent all his career for Central Córdoba de Rosario, playing 24 years for the club. He also played in the Argentina national team.

His dribbling technique made Sosa to be one of the most prominent players not only in Rosario but in Argentina. Sosa was highly regarded as the best Central Córdoba player of those times, apart from being considered the first great player from the city of Rosario.

The Central Córdoba venue was named in his honour in 1969, two years before his death.

== Career ==
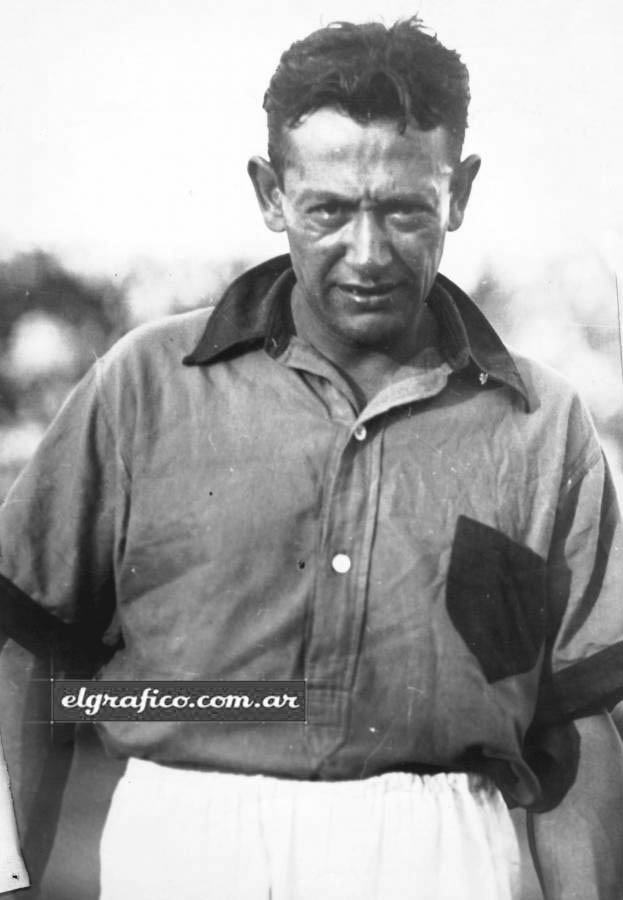
Sosa in Central Córdoba, the club where he spent his entire career

Born in Rosario, Santa Fe, Sosa began playing football for local club Central Córdoba. Playing as left wing, he made his debut in the Asociación Rosarina championship in 1913. Sosa would then switch to forward. In 1916 (with only 17 years old) Gabino Sosa was called up for the Seleccionado Rosarino, a combined team where the most prominent players of Rosario.

Sosa played his entire club career as an amateur for Central Córdoba, winning four regional championships and the 1934 Copa Adrián Beccar Varela (the most notable achievement for Central Córdoba in its history). Central Córdoba won the cup after eliminating Atlanta, Platense and Gimnasia y Esgrima (Santa Fe). Central Córdoba played the final v Racing, being awarded champion after the porteño team retired from the field in disagreement with the referee's performance.

When Argentine football turned professional in 1931, Sosa declined professional contract offers from clubs in Buenos Aires and stayed on with Central Córdoba. Sosa signed his first contract for only $ 400 and a doll that he gave his little daughter.

Sosa was first called up by the Argentina national team in 1921, to play the Campeonato Sudamericano that would win by Argentina achieving its first title. Sosa also played the 1926 championship where he scored four goals to Paraguay. Sosa played a total of 14 matches for Argentina, scoring 6 goals.

== Later years ==
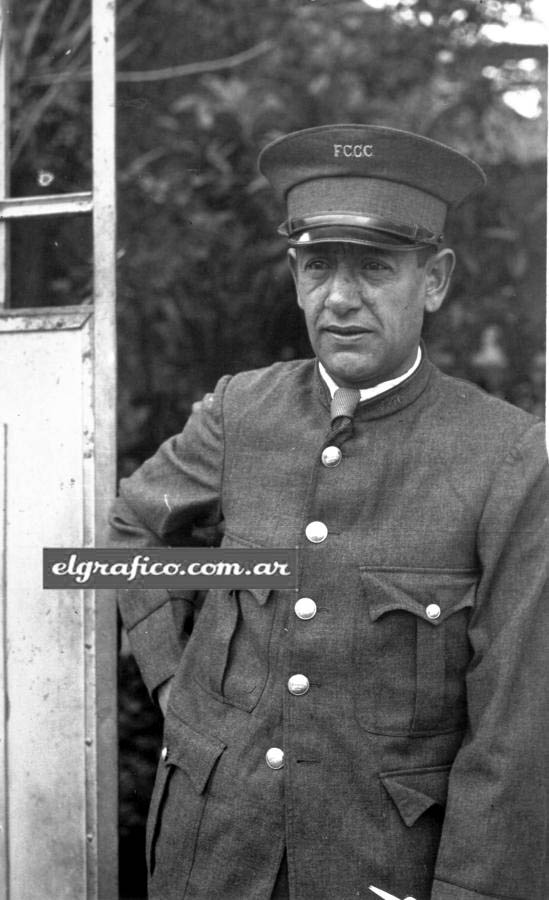
Sosa worked at the Córdoba Central Railway until his retirement in 1955

After retiring as a player Sosa worked in the Córdoba Central Railway ("Ferrocarril Central Córdoba", the British railway company from which he club took its name), until his retirement in 1955. He also became a coach, managing Central Córdoba from 1939. Sosa then remained in Central Córdoba working in the youth divisions of the club. Some of the players that develop a career under his guidance and then became notable footballers were Vicente de la Mata, Waldino Aguirre, Vicente Aguirre, José Casalini, Federico Monestés, Humberto Fiore, among others.

== Quotes ==
By 1934, my father had received an offer from Boca Juniors. The club offered him to manage a bar in La Boca plus his salary as footballer. Nevertheless, his love for Rosario and Central Córdoba was higher so he renewed his contract with Central Córdoba for $ 300. Due to the financial crisis in Argentina, the club could not pay such amount of money. While (Sosa) discussed the terms of his contract, he saw a beautiful jointed doll (made in Germany) exhibited at club's secretary. He immediately decided that the doll would be the payment for a contract extension of one year, because he wanted to give me the doll as a gift.

— María Margarita Sosa, Gabino's daughter

== Titles ==
=== Club ===
- Copa Beccar Varela (1): 1933
- Torneo Gobernador Luciano Molinas (2): 1932, 1936
- Torneo Preparación (2): 1931, 1934

=== National team ===
- Campeonato Sudamericano (1): 1921

== Bibliography ==
- Gabino Sosa, el Payador de la Redonda by Julio Rodríguez, 2017
