= Mieczysław Karłowicz (cyclist) =

Polish cyclist

Personal information
- Born: 8 September 1963 (age 63) Poland

Cycling career
- Sport: Cycling
- Role: Rider

Mieczysław Karłowicz (born 8 September 1963) is a Polish former racing cyclist. He won the Tour de Pologne 1990.
