= Copa Beccar Varela =

Copa Adrián Beccar Varela
- Organising body: LAF
- Founded: 1932
- Abolished: 1934; 91 years ago (Note: The 2nd edition of the championship was played from Dec 1933 to Feb 1934.)
- Region: Argentina
- Number of teams: 18 (1933)
- Last champions: Central Córdoba (R) (1933)

The Copa de Honor Adrián Beccar Varela (or simply Copa Adrián Beccar Varela) was an Argentine official football competition organized by dissident "Liga Argentina de Football", the first league that organised professional competition in Argentina. The trophy was named after Adrián Beccar Varela, president of both bodies, dissident "Asociación Amateurs de Football" (1920) and the official association (1927–28).

== Overview ==
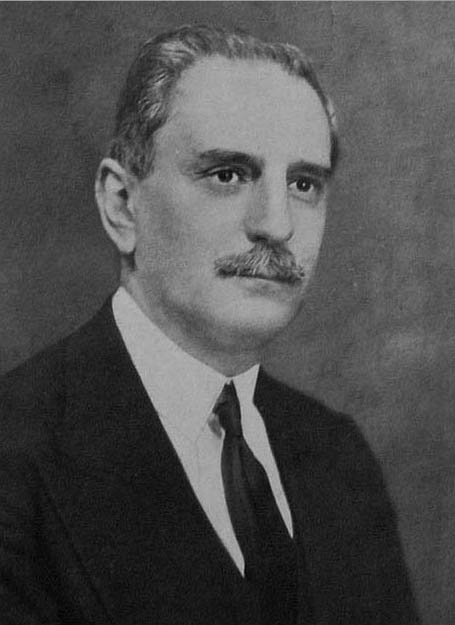
The trophy was named after Adrián Beccar Varela, president of the Argentine Football Association from 1927 to his death in 1929

The first edition was contested by 18 Primera División teams. The format of the tournament was a group stage where teams competed within 3 groups of 6 teams each. Each group played a round-robin tournament, in which each team was scheduled for three matches against other teams in the same group. The team finishing first of each group advanced to the next stage where they played each other, and the team with more points at the end of the round was proclaimed champion.

For the second edition played in 1933, four Uruguayan clubs (Peñarol, Nacional, Defensor and Sud América) took part of the competition, although the Association considered it as a national cup.

== Champions ==
Ed.	Year	Champion	Score	Runner-up	Venue	City
1	1932	Racing	– (Note: In this first edition, no final was held. The three finalists (Racing, Boca Juniors, and Tigre) played a final round, won by Racing on points (4) after beating its two rivals.)	Boca Juniors	–	
2	1933	Central Córdoba (R) (Note: The association awarded Central Córdoba the championship after Racing Club players abandoned the match in disagreement with referee's rulings.)	2–2	Racing	River Plate	Buenos Aires

=== Topscorers ===
Year	Player	Goals	Club
1932	(Argentina) Evaristo Barrera	7	Racing
1933	(Argentina) Demetrio Conidares	13	Racing

== Other trophies ==
Otherwise, there was another trophy also named "Copa Adrián Beccar Varela" but organized by the official association and played by teams of regional leagues. The first edition was held in 1929 and won by a combined from Liga Rosarina de Football.
