= Isidoro Benítez Casco =

Paraguayan footballer

Personal information
- Position: Midfielder

International career
Years	Team	Apps	(Gls)
	Paraguay	11	(0)
Medal record
Men's football
Silver medal – second place	Brazil 1922
Bronze medal – third place	Uruguay 1924

Isidoro Benítez Casco was a Paraguayan footballer who played as a midfielder.

Benítez Casco represented Paraguay at the 1921 South American Championship, where Paraguay finished fourth and last. He played in all three of Paraguay's matches, against Uruguay, Brazil and Argentina.

A year later, he took part in the 1922 South American Championship, where Paraguay finished as runners-up. Benítez Casco appeared in all five of the team's matches, against Brazil, Chile, Uruguay and Argentina, as well as in the championship play-off against Brazil.

He also played in the 1924 South American Championship, where Paraguay finished third. He appeared in all three matches, against Argentina, Uruguay and Chile.
