= Mario Markic =

Argentine journalist and writer (born 1953)

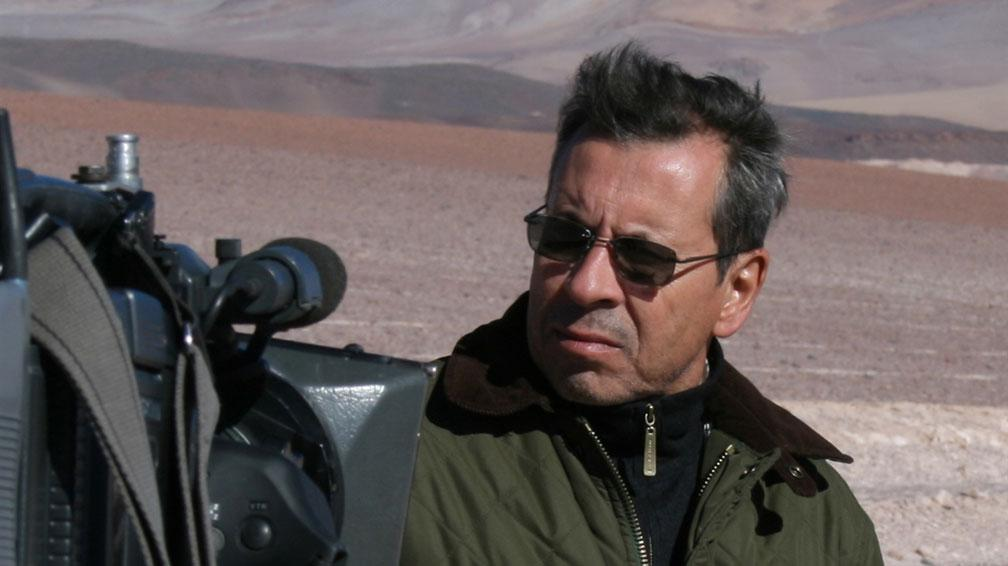
- Argentine journalist and writer
- Born: 1953 (age 72–73); Río Gallegos, Argentina
- Writing career
- Language: Spanish
- Notable works: "Patagonia de puño y letra" "Cuadernos del camino"

Mario Markic (born 1953 in Río Gallegos, Argentina) is an Argentine journalist and writer. He has written "Cuadernos del camino" and "Patagonia de puño y letra", he also hosts "En el camino" and "La mejor publicidad del mundo", TV shows.

In 2011 he won the Martín Fierro in the category of "Mejor labor periodistica masculina" for his work in Telenoche.
