= Central Córdoba de Rosario =

Central Córdoba
- Full name: Club Atlético Central Córdoba
- Nickname: Charrúa
- Founded: 20 October 1906; 119 years ago
- Ground: Estadio Gabino Sosa, Rosario, Santa Fe
- Capacity: 17,000
- Chairman: Jorge Cornú
- Manager: Marcelo Vivas
- League: Primera C
- 2016: 18°
- Website: https://www.centralcordoba.com.ar/
Home colours	Away colours

Club Atlético Central Córdoba de Rosario, usually just Central Córdoba de Rosario is an Argentine football club based in the city of Rosario, Santa Fe. The team currently plays in Primera C Metropolitana, the regionalised fourth division of the Argentine football league system.

== History ==
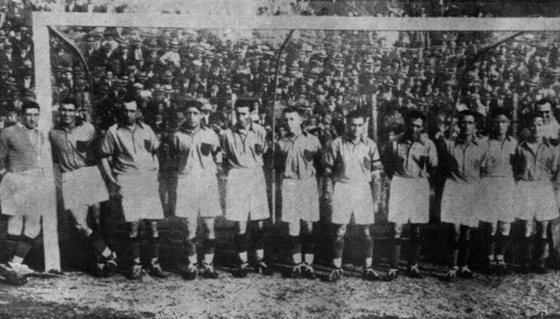
The 1933 team that won the Copa Beccar Varela, its only title in Primera División

The club was founded in 1906 by a group of railway workers and named after the Córdoba Central Railway that ran from Retiro railway station to Córdoba through Rosario.

The nickname "Charrúas" was born from a misspelling, when the journalist Alejandro Berrutti wrote an article in "La Nota" (a satirical newspaper printed in Rosario) where he wrongly named "Arturo Charrúa" to Arturo Charra, the manager who represented Central Córdoba in the Rosario Football League. This mistake has remained as the most popular nickname for Central Cordoba since then, such as the Club and players as its supporters too.

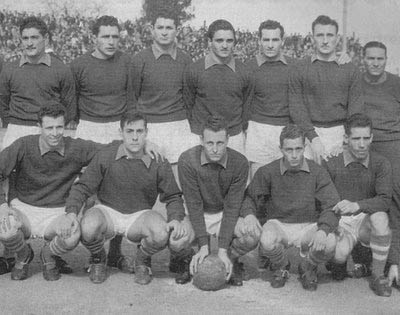
The team that won the Primera B title in 1957

Some of the most highlighted footballers were Gabino Sosa (who gave his name to the stadium), Vicente De la Mata -although he spent most of his career in Independiente-, and Tomás "El Trinche" Carlovich, who has been recognized by Diego Maradona and José Pekerman as the best domestic football player ever. Carlovich's legend rose during a friendly match between a team formed by some prominent Rosarino players, such as Daniel Killer, Mario Kempes, Mario Zanabria, Gabriel Caballero and Carlovich, and the Argentina national football team which was to dispute the 1974 World Cup.

At the end of the first half, the Rosario team was defeating Argentina 3–0. The journalist attending the match stated that Carlovich's performance during the first 45 minutes had been so outstanding that national team coach Vladislao Cap, asked the Rosario coach if Carlovich could be substituted at halftime. Rosario's coach agreed to that requirement so Carlovich did not play the 2nd half, with Rosario winning the match 3–1.

Another notable player was Daniel "Pato" Núñez, who is the all-time leading scorer, and Andrés Radice. Central Córdoba played in Argentine Primera División in 1958 and 1959.

== Honours ==
=== National ===
==== League ====
- Primera División B (1): 1957
- Primera B Metropolitana (1): 1990–91
- Primera División C (1): 1973
- Segunda División (1): 1952
- Primera C (1): 1987–88

==== National cups ====
- Copa Adrián Beccar Varela (1): 1933

=== Regional ===
- Torneo del Litoral (1): 1939
- Torneo Gobernador Luciano Molinas (10): 1932, 1936, 1939, 1947, 1954, 1955, 1957, 1967, 1989, 2019
- Torneo Eliminatorio de la Asociación Rosarina de Fútbol (1): 1931
- Torneo Preparación de la Asociación Rosarina de Fútbol (1): 1934
- Torneo Hermenegildo Ivancich (5): 1941, 1942, 2007, 2009, 2018
- Copa Santiago Pinasco (Segunda división) (3): 1923, 1927, 1928
