= Victorio Taccetti =

Argentine diplomat

Victorio María José Taccetti (born 22 January 1943) is an Argentine career diplomat. He served as ambassador to Mexico, Italy and Germany, and Secretary of Foreign Relations of the Nation (2008–2010).

== Background ==
In December 2003, he was appointed ambassador to Italy, also being Permanent Representative of Argentina to the Food and Agriculture Organization (FAO), and concurrent ambassador to Albania and Malta.

He was Foreign Affairs Secretary of the Ministry of Foreign Affairs till 2010. In 2021 he held the position of Director of the National Foreign Service Institute for 5 months, from February to June 2021.
