= David Arellano =

Chilean footballer (1901-1927)

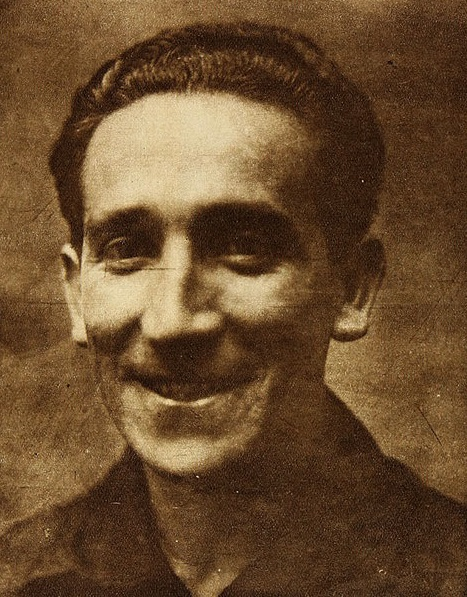

Personal information
- Full name: David Alfonso Arellano Moraga
- Date of birth: 29 July 1901
- Place of birth: Santiago, Chile
- Date of death: 3 May 1927 (aged 25)
- Place of death: Valladolid, Spain
- Height: 1.74 m (5 ft 9 in)
- Positions: Forward; winger

Senior career*
Years	Team	Apps	(Gls)
1919–1925	Magallanes		
1925–1927	Colo-Colo		

International career
1924–1926	Chile	6	(7)
- * Club domestic league appearances and goals

David Alfonso Arellano Moraga (29 July 1901 – 3 May 1927) was a Chilean footballer and founder of the Colo-Colo football club. A winger, he scored in the 1926 South American Championship (Copa América) and is considered one of the best Chilean football players in history.

== Career ==
Arellano was born in Santiago, Chile on 29 July 1901. His professional debut came aged 17 for Chilean football club Magallanes in 1919. In 1925 he, along with other members, parted from the Magallanes football club to form a new club, which came to be known in Chile as Colo-Colo. Arellano played for the Chile national team that participated in the 1924 and 1926 editions of Copa America. In the latter, he was the top scorer, with 7 goals.

== Introduced and popularized the bicycle kick across Europe ==
Arellano is attributed with showcasing the bicycle kick or, in Chile and other parts of South America known as the Chilena through footballing tours that were conducted in Europe.

== Death ==
On 3 May 1927 in Valladolid, Spain while on tour with Colo-Colo, David Arellano suffered peritonitis after being hit by an opposing player during a match. Shortly after the incident, Arellano was brought to a nearby clinic, where he would ultimately die. In his memory, Colo-Colo club shirts carry a black line over the main emblem, as does the Estadio Monumental David Arellano.
