= 1924 South American Championship =

Football tournament

Tournament details
- Host country: Uruguay
- Dates: 12 October – 2 November
- Teams: 4 (from 1 confederation)
- Venue: 1 (in 1 host city)

Final positions
- Champions: Uruguay (5th title)
- Runners-up: Argentina
- Third place: Paraguay
- Fourth place: Chile

Tournament statistics
- Matches played: 6
- Goals scored: 15 (2.5 per match)
- Top scorer(s): (Uruguay) Pedro Petrone (4 goals)

The eighth edition of the South American Championship was held in Montevideo, Uruguay from 12 October to 2 November 1924.

== Overview ==
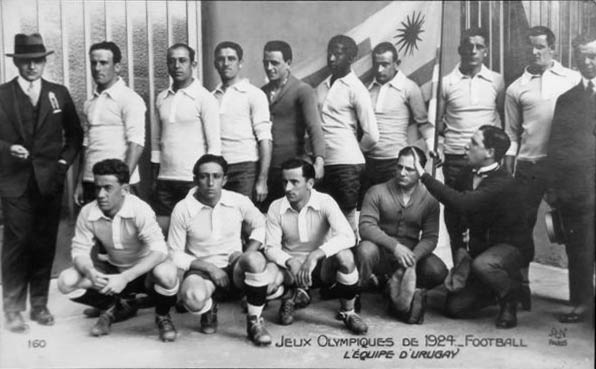
The Uruguayan side had previously won the Olympics championship in Paris

CONMEBOL asked the Paraguayan Football Association to organize it, but it refused because they lacked the infrastructure for such an event. However, the association did organize it, but by way of honouring the recent Paris 1924 gold-medallists, Uruguay, it was held there.

The participating countries were Argentina, Chile, Paraguay and Uruguay. Brazil withdrew from the tournament.

== Squads ==
For a complete list of participants squads see: 1924 South American Championship squads

== Venues ==
Montevideo
Estadio Gran Parque Central
Capacity: 20,000
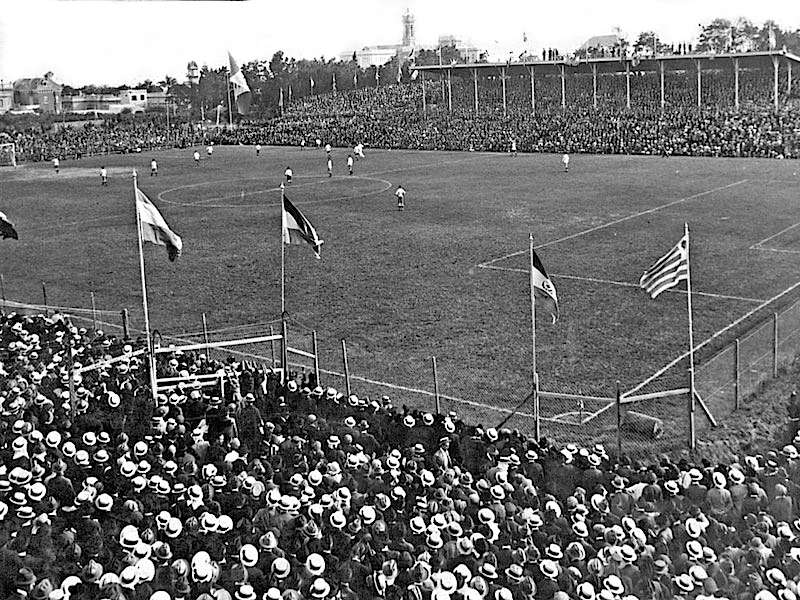

== Final round ==
Each team played one match against each of the other teams. Two points were awarded for a win, one point for a draw and zero points for a defeat.

| Team | Pld | W | D | L | GF | GA | GD | Pts |
|---|---|---|---|---|---|---|---|---|
| Uruguay | 3 | 2 | 1 | 0 | 8 | 1 | +7 | 5 |
| Argentina | 3 | 1 | 2 | 0 | 2 | 0 | +2 | 4 |
| Paraguay | 3 | 1 | 1 | 1 | 4 | 4 | 0 | 3 |
| Chile | 3 | 0 | 0 | 3 | 1 | 10 | −9 | 0 |

12 October 1924

| Argentina | 0–0 | Paraguay |

Parque Central, Montevideo
Referee: Angel Minoli (Uruguay)

19 October 1924

| Uruguay | 5–0 | Chile |
|---|---|---|
| Petrone 40', 53', 88'; Zingone 73'; Romano 78' |

Parque Central, Montevideo
Referee: Eduardo Jara (Paraguay)

25 October 1924

| Argentina | 2–0 | Chile |
|---|---|---|
| Sosa 5'; Loyarte 78' |

Parque Central, Montevideo
Referee: Angel Minoli (Uruguay)

26 October 1924

| Uruguay | 3–1 | Paraguay |
|---|---|---|
| Petrone 28'; Romano 37'; Cea 53' | | Urbita Sosa 77' |

Parque Central, Montevideo
Referee: Alberto Parodi (Chile)

1 November 1924

| Paraguay | 3–1 | Chile |
|---|---|---|
| López 15', 33'; Rivas 52' | | David Arellano 6' |

Parque Central, Montevideo
Referee: Servando Pérez (Argentina)

2 November 1924

| Uruguay | 0–0 | Argentina |

Parque Central, Montevideo
Referee: Carlos Fanta (Chile)

== Result ==
1924 South American Championship champions

Uruguay
Fifth title

== Goal scorers ==
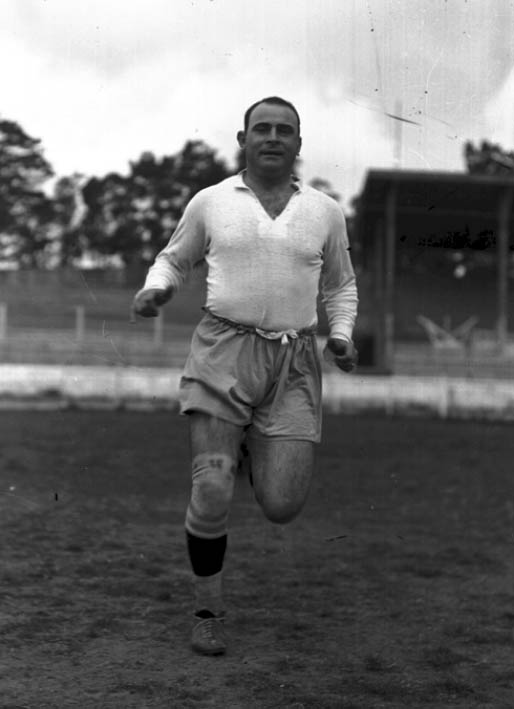
Pedro Petrone, top scorer

4 goals

- (Uruguay) Pedro Petrone

2 goals

- (Paraguay) Ildefonso López
- (Uruguay) Ángel Romano

1 goal

- (Argentina) Gabino Sosa
- (Argentina) Juan Loyarte
- (Chile) David Arellano
- (Paraguay) Gerardo Rivas
- (Paraguay) Pasiano Urbita
- (Uruguay) José Cea
- (Uruguay) Pedro Zingone
