= 1958 FIFA World Cup Group 2 =

Football tournament group stage

Group 2 of the 1958 FIFA World Cup took place from 8 to 15 June 1958. The group consisted of France, Paraguay, Scotland, and Yugoslavia.

== Standings ==
Pos	Team	Pld	W	D	L	GF	GA	GR	Pts	Qualification
1	France	3	2	0	1	11	7	1.571	4 (Note: France finished ahead of Yugoslavia on goal average.)	Advance to knockout stage
2	Yugoslavia	3	1	2	0	7	6	1.167	4	Advance to knockout stage
3	Paraguay	3	1	1	1	9	12	0.750	3	
4	Scotland	3	0	1	2	4	6	0.667	1	

Source: FIFA

== Matches ==
All times listed are local time.

=== France vs Paraguay ===
8 June 1958
19:00 (CET)

France	7–3	Paraguay
Fontaine 24', 30', 67'; Piantoni 52'; Wisnieski 61'; Kopa 70'; Vincent 83'		Amarilla 20', 44' (pen.); Romero 50'

Idrottsparken, Norrköping
Attendance: 16,518
Referee: Juan Gardeazábal Garay (Spain)

France
Paraguay

GK	3	François Remetter
DF	4	Raymond Kaelbel
DF	5	André Lerond
DF	13	Armand Penverne
MF	10	Robert Jonquet (c)
MF	12	Jean-Jacques Marcel
FW	22	Maryan Wisnieski
FW	18	Raymond Kopa
FW	17	Just Fontaine
FW	20	Roger Piantoni
FW	21	Jean Vincent
Manager:
Albert Batteux

GK	1	Ramon Mayeregger
DF	2	Edelmiro Arévalo
DF	17	Agustín Miranda
DF	4	Ignacio Achúcarro
MF	3	Juan Vicente Lezcano
MF	5	Salvador Villalba
FW	7	Juan Bautista Agüero (c)
FW	8	José Parodi
FW	9	Jorge Lino Romero
FW	21	Cayetano Ré
FW	11	Florencio Amarilla
Manager:
Aurelio González

=== Yugoslavia vs Scotland ===
8 June 1958
19:00 (CET)

Yugoslavia	1–1	Scotland
Petaković 6'		Murray 49'

Arosvallen, Västerås
Attendance: 9,591
Referee: Raymond Wyssling (Switzerland)

Yugoslavia
Scotland

GK	1	Vladimir Beara
DF	3	Vasilije Šijaković
DF	4	Tomislav Crnković
DF	6	Branko Zebec (c)
MF	8	Dobrosav Krstić
MF	9	Vujadin Boškov
FW	12	Aleksandar Petaković
FW	13	Todor Veselinović
FW	7	Miloš Milutinović
FW	15	Dragoslav Šekularac
FW	17	Zdravko Rajkov
Manager:
Aleksandar Tirnanić

GK	1	Tommy Younger (c)
DF	4	Eric Caldow
DF	5	John Hewie
DF	9	Bobby Evans
MF	8	Eddie Turnbull
MF	12	Doug Cowie
FW	14	Graham Leggat
FW	16	Jimmy Murray
FW	17	Jackie Mudie
FW	19	Bobby Collins
FW	21	Stewart Imlach
Manager:
Dawson Walker

=== Yugoslavia vs France ===
11 June 1958
19:00 (CET)

Yugoslavia	3–2	France
Petaković 16'; Veselinović 63', 88'		Fontaine 4', 85'

Arosvallen, Västerås
Attendance: 12,217
Referee: Benjamin Griffiths (Wales)

Yugoslavia
France

GK	1	Vladimir Beara
DF	5	Novak Tomić
DF	4	Tomislav Crnković
DF	6	Branko Zebec (c)
MF	8	Dobrosav Krstić
MF	9	Vujadin Boškov
FW	12	Aleksandar Petaković
FW	13	Todor Veselinović
FW	7	Miloš Milutinović
FW	15	Dragoslav Šekularac
FW	17	Zdravko Rajkov
Manager:
Aleksandar Tirnanić

GK	3	François Remetter
DF	4	Raymond Kaelbel
DF	6	Roger Marche (c)
DF	13	Armand Penverne
MF	10	Robert Jonquet
MF	5	André Lerond
FW	22	Maryan Wisnieski
FW	18	Raymond Kopa
FW	17	Just Fontaine
FW	20	Roger Piantoni
FW	21	Jean Vincent
Manager:
Albert Batteux

=== Paraguay vs Scotland ===
11 June 1958
19:00 (CET)

Paraguay	3–2	Scotland
Agüero 4'; Ré 45'; Parodi 73'		Mudie 24'; Collins 74'

Idrottsparken, Norrköping
Attendance: 11,665
Referee: Vincenzo Orlandini (Italy)

Paraguay
Scotland

GK	12	Samuel Aguilar
DF	2	Edelmiro Arévalo
DF	6	Eligio Echagüe
DF	4	Ignacio Achúcarro
MF	3	Juan Vicente Lezcano
MF	5	Salvador Villalba
FW	7	Juan Bautista Agüero (c)
FW	8	José Parodi
FW	9	Jorge Lino Romero
FW	21	Cayetano Ré
FW	11	Florencio Amarilla
Manager:
Aurelio González

GK	1	Tommy Younger (c)
DF	3	Alex Parker
DF	4	Eric Caldow
DF	9	Bobby Evans
MF	8	Eddie Turnbull
MF	12	Doug Cowie
FW	14	Graham Leggat
FW	17	Jackie Mudie
FW	19	Bobby Collins
FW	20	Archie Robertson
FW	22	Willie Fernie
Manager:
Dawson Walker

=== France vs Scotland ===
15 June 1958
19:00 (CET)

France	2–1	Scotland
Kopa 22'; Fontaine 44'		Baird 66'

Eyravallen, Örebro
Attendance: 13,554
Referee: Juan Regis Brozzi (Argentina)

France
Scotland

GK	1	Claude Abbes
DF	4	Raymond Kaelbel
DF	5	André Lerond
DF	13	Armand Penverne
MF	10	Robert Jonquet (c)
MF	12	Jean-Jacques Marcel
FW	22	Maryan Wisnieski
FW	18	Raymond Kopa
FW	17	Just Fontaine
FW	20	Roger Piantoni
FW	21	Jean Vincent
Manager:
Albert Batteux

GK	2	Bill Brown
DF	4	Eric Caldow
DF	5	John Hewie
DF	9	Bobby Evans (c)
MF	8	Eddie Turnbull
MF	11	Dave Mackay
FW	19	Bobby Collins
FW	16	Jimmy Murray
FW	17	Jackie Mudie
FW	13	Sammy Baird
FW	21	Stewart Imlach
Manager:
Dawson Walker

=== Paraguay vs Yugoslavia ===
15 June 1958
19:00 (CET)

Paraguay	3–3	Yugoslavia
Parodi 20'; Agüero 52'; Romero 80'		Ognjanović 18'; Veselinović 21'; Rajkov 73'

Tunavallen, Eskilstuna
Attendance: 13,103
Referee: Martin Macko (Czechoslovakia)

Paraguay
Yugoslavia

GK	12	Samuel Aguilar
DF	2	Edelmiro Arévalo
DF	6	Eligio Echagüe
DF	4	Ignacio Achúcarro
MF	3	Juan Vicente Lezcano
MF	5	Salvador Villalba
FW	7	Juan Bautista Agüero (c)
FW	8	José Parodi
FW	9	Jorge Lino Romero
FW	21	Cayetano Ré
FW	11	Florencio Amarilla
Manager:
Aurelio González

GK	1	Vladimir Beara
DF	5	Novak Tomić
DF	4	Tomislav Crnković
DF	6	Branko Zebec (c)
MF	8	Dobrosav Krstić
MF	9	Vujadin Boškov
FW	12	Aleksandar Petaković
FW	13	Todor Veselinović
FW	19	Radivoje Ognjanović
FW	15	Dragoslav Šekularac
FW	17	Zdravko Rajkov
Manager:
Aleksandar Tirnanić

== See also ==
- France at the FIFA World Cup
- Paraguay at the FIFA World Cup
- Scotland at the FIFA World Cup
- Yugoslavia at the FIFA World Cup
