= 1958 FIFA World Cup qualification (CONMEBOL – Group 3) =

Football tournament qualification stage

The three teams in this group played against each other on a home-and-away basis. The group winner Paraguay qualified for the sixth FIFA World Cup held in Sweden.

== Table ==
Pos	Team	Pld	W	D	L	GF	GA	GR	Pts	Qualification	Paraguay national football team	Uruguay national football team	Colombia national football team
1	Paraguay	4	3	0	1	11	4	2.750	6	Qualification to 1958 FIFA World Cup	—	5–0	3–0
2	Uruguay	4	2	1	1	4	6	0.667	5		2–0	—	1–0
3	Colombia	4	0	1	3	3	8	0.375	1		2–3	1–1	—

== Matches ==
16 June 1957

Colombia	1–1	Uruguay
Arango 15'		Ambrois 46'

Referee: Husband (England)

20 June 1957

Colombia	2–3	Paraguay
Gutiérrez 10'; Díaz 89'		A. Jara 34'; Agüero 68'; Aguilera 88'

Referee: Husband (England)

30 June 1957

Uruguay	1–0	Colombia
Míguez 89' (pen.)

Referee: Husband (England)

7 July 1957

Paraguay	3–0	Colombia
E. Jara 11', 77'; Agüero 27'

Referee: Husband (England)

14 July 1957

Paraguay	5–0	Uruguay
Amarilla 5', 48', 57'; A. Jara 88'; Agüero 90'

Referee: Husband (England)

28 July 1957

Uruguay	2–0	Paraguay
Benítez 8'; Martínez 88'

Referee: Husband (England)

== Team stats ==
=== Paraguay ===
Head coach: (Paraguay) Aurelio González

Pos.	Player	DoB	Games played	Goals	Minutes played	Sub off	Sub on	(Colombia)	(Colombia)	(Uruguay)	(Uruguay)	Club
DF	Ignacio Achúcarro	July 31, 1936	4	0	360	0	0	90	90	90	90	(Paraguay) Club Olimpia
FW	Juan Agüero	June 24, 1935	4	2	360	0	0	90	90	90	90	(Paraguay) Club Olimpia
FW	Óscar Aguilera	March 11, 1935	4	0	360	0	0	90	90	90	90	(Paraguay) Club Olimpia
FW	Florencio Amarilla	January 3, 1935	2	3	180	0	0	-	-	90	90	(Paraguay) Club Nacional
DF	Edelmiro Arévalo	January 7, 1929	4	0	360	0	0	90	90	90	90	(Paraguay) Club Olimpia
FW	Genaro Benítez	July 17, 1929	2	0	180	0	0	90	90	-	-	(Paraguay) Cerro Porteño
GK	Honorio Casco		2	0	180	0	0	90	90	-	-	(Paraguay) Cerro Porteño
DF	Eligio Echagüe	December 31, 1938	3	0	270	0	0	90	90	90	-	(Paraguay) Club Olimpia
FW	Ángel Jara	October 1, 1936	4	2	360	0	0	90	90	90	90	(Paraguay) Cerro Porteño
FW	Enrique Jara Saguier	July 12, 1934	4	3	360	0	0	90	90	90	90	(Paraguay) Cerro Porteño
MF	Juan Vicente Lezcano	April 5, 1937	4	0	360	0	0	90	90	90	90	(Paraguay) Club Olimpia
DF	Agustín Miranda	1930	1	0	90	0	0	-	-	-	90	(Paraguay) Cerro Porteño
GK	Rubén Noceda	May 11, 1931	2	0	180	0	0	-	-	90	90	(Paraguay) Presidente Hayes
MF	Salvador Villalba	August 29, 1924	4	0	360	0	0	90	90	90	90	(Paraguay) Club Libertad

=== Uruguay ===
Head coach: (Uruguay) Juan López Fontana

Pos.	Player	DoB	Games played	Goals	Minutes played	Sub off	Sub on	(Colombia)	(Colombia)	(Paraguay)	(Paraguay)	Club
FW	Julio Acosta		1	0	90	0	0	-	-	-	90	(Uruguay) Nacional
FW	Javier Ambrois	May 9, 1932	3	1	270	0	0	90	90	90	-	(Uruguay) Nacional
FW	Eladio Benítez		1	1	90	0	0	-	-	-	90	(Uruguay) Racing
FW	Carlos Borges	January 14, 1932	4	0	360	0	0	90	90	90	90	(Uruguay) C.A. Peñarol
FW	Luis Campero		1	0	90	0	0	90	-	-	-	(Uruguay) Liverpool
DF	Carlos Correa		3	1	270	0	0	90	90	-	90	(Uruguay) Danubio F.C.
MF	Héctor de Marco	May 31, 1936	1	0	90	0	0	-	-	-	90	(Uruguay) Defensor
MF	Néstor Gonçalves	April 27, 1936	4	0	360	0	0	90	90	90	90	(Uruguay) C.A. Peñarol
MF	Edgardo González	September 30, 1936	4	0	360	0	0	90	90	90	90	(Uruguay) Liverpool
DF	William Martínez	January 13, 1928	4	0	360	0	0	90	90	90	90	(Uruguay) C.A. Peñarol
FW	Óscar Míguez	December 5, 1927	2	1	180	0	0	-	90	90	-	(Uruguay) C.A. Peñarol
MF	Luis Miramontes		4	0	360	0	0	90	90	90	90	(Uruguay) Defensor
FW	Héctor Núñez	May 8, 1936	1	0	90	0	0	-	-	-	90	(Uruguay) Nacional
FW	Rodolfo Pippo		2	0	180	0	0	90	-	90	-	(Uruguay) C.A. Cerro
FW	Héctor Rodríguez	1935	2	0	180	0	0	90	90	-	-	(Uruguay) Nacional
FW	José Roque		2	0	180	0	0	-	90	90	-	(Uruguay) Rampla Juniors
GK	Walter Taibo	March 7, 1931	4	0	360	0	0	90	90	90	90	(Uruguay) Nacional
MF	Óscar Vilariño		1	0	90	0	0	-	-	90	-	(Uruguay) C.A. Cerro

=== Colombia ===
Head coach: (Argentina) Rodolfo Orlandini

Pos.	Player	DoB	Games played	Goals	Minutes played	Sub off	Sub on	(Uruguay)	(Paraguay)	(Uruguay)	(Paraguay)	Club
FW	Carlos Arango	January 31, 1928	4	1	360	0	0	90	90	90	90	(Colombia) Santa Fe
MF	Ignacio Calle	November 16, 1930	2	0	180	0	0	-	-	90	90	(Colombia) Atlético Nacional
FW	Alejandro Carrillo	February 22, 1931	4	0	360	0	0	90	90	90	90	(Colombia) Atlético Quindío
DF	Hernando Caicedo	March 23, 1929	2	0	180	0	0	-	-	90	90	(Colombia) Independiente Medellín
FW	Marcos Coll	August 23, 1935	3	0	270	0	0	90	90	90	-	(Colombia) Deportes Tolima
FW	Valerio de la Tour	April 26, 1929	1	0	90	0	0	-	-	-	90	(Colombia) Cúcuta Deportivo
MF	Ricardo Díaz	August 7, 1932	4	1	360	0	0	90	90	90	90	(Colombia) Atlético Quindío
DF	Héctor Echeverry	April 10, 1938	2	0	180	0	0	-	90	-	90	(Colombia) Independiente Medellín
GK	Fernando Fernández	December 31, 1928	0	0	0	0	0	-	-	-	-	(Colombia) Unión Magdalena
FW	Delio Gamboa	January 28, 1936	2	0	180	0	0	-	-	90	90	(Colombia) Atlético Nacional
FW	Héctor García	April 11, 1936	2	0	180	0	0	90	90	-	-	(Colombia) Millonarios
FW	Jaime Gutiérrez	February 29, 1930	4	1	360	0	0	90	90	90	90	(Colombia) Independiente Medellín
MF	Hernando Moyano	October 7, 1929	2	0	180	0	0	90	90	-	-	(Colombia) Millonarios
FW	Miguel Panesso	April 2, 1933	0	0	0	0	0	-	-	-	-	(Colombia) Boca Juniors de Cali
MF	Hernando Reyes	May 24, 1932	0	0	0	0	0	-	-	-	-	(Colombia) Santa Fe
DF	Luis Alberto Rubio	February 28, 1928	2	0	180	0	0	90	90	-	-	(Colombia) Millonarios
GK	Efraín Sánchez	February 27, 1926	4	0	360	0	0	90	90	90	90	(Colombia) Independiente Medellín
MF	Jaime Silva	October 10, 1935	4	0	360	0	0	90	90	90	90	(Colombia) Santa Fe
MF	Roaldo Viáfara	May 23, 1926	0	0	0	0	0	-	-	-	-	(Colombia) América
FW	Luis Alfonso Villegas	March 5, 1934	0	0	0	0	0	-	-	-	-	(Colombia) Independiente Medellín
DF	Francisco Zuluaga	February 4, 1929	2	0	180	0	0	90	-	90	-	(Colombia) Millonarios
