= 1960 Copa Libertadores finals =

1960 Copa de Campeones finals
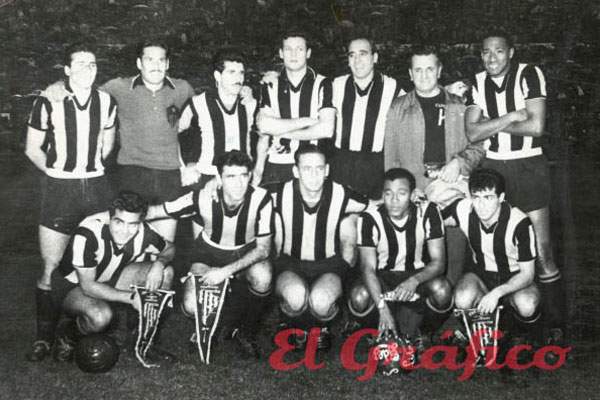
- Peñarol, champions
- Event: 1960 Copa de Campeones de América
Peñarol	Olimpia
(Uruguay)	(Paraguay)
2	1
- Peñarol won 3–1 on points.

First leg
Peñarol	Olimpia
1	0
- Date: June 12, 1960
- Venue: Estadio Centenario, Montevideo, Uruguay
- Referee: Carlos Robles (Chile)
- Attendance: 44,690

Second leg
Olimpia	Peñarol
1	1
- Date: June 19, 1960
- Venue: Puerto Sajonia, Asunción, Paraguay
- Referee: José Luis Praddaude (Argentina)
- Attendance: 20,000

The 1960 Copa de Campeones finals was a football series between Peñarol and Olimpia on June 12 and 19. It was the final of the first staging of the Copa de Campeones de América (known in the modern era as the Copa Libertadores), which would go on to become the premier club competition in South American football and one of the most prestigious competitions in the world. Seven teams entered the competition in its first season, and due to the odd number of teams, Olimpia reached the finals, having won only one match and playing merely two. Peñarol had dispatched Jorge Wilstermann and needed a playoff to overcome San Lorenzo to reach the finals with the weight of having played five matches.

Alberto Spencer became the first player to score a goal in the final of this tournament. He also became the first person to score two goals in a final series. Juan Vicente Lezcano became the first player to be sent off in the finals when he was given his marching order on the first leg. The final was effectively decided by a late equalizer in the second leg, scored six minutes from full-time by Alberto Spencer, in a volatile and highly charged game in Asunción. The Manyas became the first-ever winners of South America's premier club tournament.

== Qualified teams ==
Team	Previous finals appearances (bold indicates winners)
(Uruguay) Peñarol	None
(Paraguay) Olimpia	None

== Stadiums ==
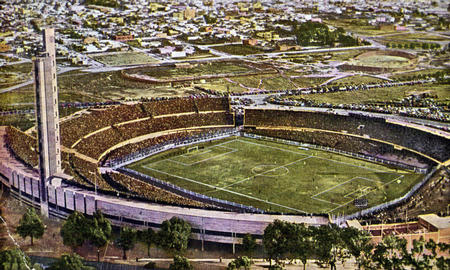
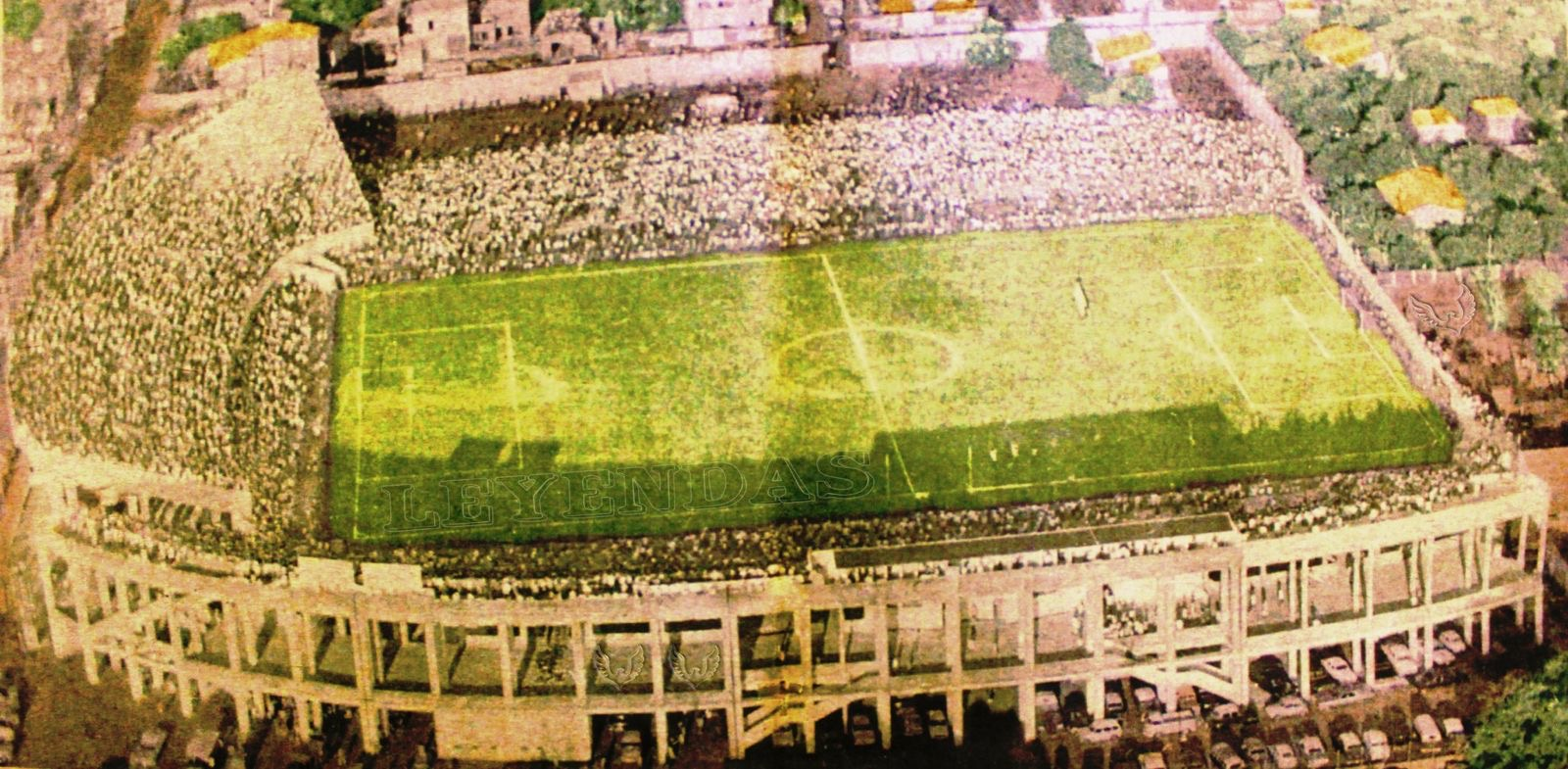
Estadio Centenario of Uruguay and Puerto Sajonia were the venues for the finals.

== Rules ==
The final were played over two legs; home and away. The team that accumulated the most points —two for a win, one for a draw, zero for a loss— after the two legs would be crowned the champion. Should the two teams be tied on points after the second leg, the team with the best goal difference would win. If the two teams had equal goal difference, a playoff match at a neutral venue would be contested.

== Match details ==
=== First leg ===
1960 Copa Libertadores finals
June 12, 1960
First leg

Peñarol (Uruguay)	1–0	(Paraguay) Olimpia
Spencer 79'

Estadio Centenario, Montevideo
Attendance: 44,690
Referee: Carlos Robles (Chile)

**Peñarol**	**Olimpia**

GK	(Uruguay) Luis Maidana
DF	(Uruguay) William Martínez
DF	(Brazil) Salvador
DF	(Uruguay) Santiago Pino
DF	(Uruguay) Néstor Gonçalves (c)
MF	(Uruguay) Walter Aguerre
MF	(Uruguay) Luis Cubilla
FW	(Uruguay) Carlos Abel Linazza
FW	(Ecuador) Alberto Spencer
FW	(Uruguay) Júpiter Crescio
FW	(Uruguay) Carlos Borges
Manager:
(Uruguay) Roberto Scarone

GK	(Paraguay) Herminio Arias
DF	(Paraguay) Edelmiro Arévalo
DF	(Paraguay) Juan Vicente Lezcano (red card)
DF	(Paraguay) Mariano Osorio
DF	(Paraguay) Claudio Lezcano (c)
MF	(Paraguay) Pascual Rojas
MF	(Paraguay) Vicente Rodríguez
FW	(Paraguay) Hipólito Recalde
FW	(Paraguay) Luis Doldán
FW	(Paraguay) Pedro Antonio Cabral
FW	(Paraguay) Teovaldo Melgarejo
Manager:
(Paraguay) Aurelio González

=== Second leg ===
June 19, 1960
Second leg

Olimpia (Paraguay)	1–1	(Uruguay) Peñarol
Recalde 28'		Cubilla 83'

Puerto Sajonia, Asunción
Attendance: 20,000
Referee: José Luis Praddaude (Argentina)

**Olimpia**	**Peñarol**

GK	(Paraguay) Herminio Arias
DF	(Paraguay) Edelmiro Arévalo
DF	(Paraguay) Juan Peralta
DF	(Paraguay) Pascual Rojas
DF	(Paraguay) Claudio Lezcano (c)
MF	(Paraguay) Eligio Echagüe
MF	(Paraguay) Vicente Rodríguez
FW	(Paraguay) Hipólito Recalde
FW	(Paraguay) Luis Doldán
FW	(Paraguay) Pedro Antonio Cabral
FW	(Paraguay) Teovaldo Melgarejo
Manager:
(Paraguay) Aurelio González

GK	(Uruguay) Luis Maidana
DF	(Uruguay) William Martínez
DF	(Brazil) Salvador
DF	(Uruguay) Santiago Pino
DF	(Uruguay) Néstor Gonçalves (c)
MF	(Uruguay) Walter Aguerre
MF	(Uruguay) Luis Cubilla
FW	(Uruguay) Carlos Abel Linazza
FW	(Ecuador) Alberto Spencer
FW	(Uruguay) José Mario Griecco
FW	(Uruguay) Carlos Borges
Manager:
(Uruguay) Roberto Scarone
