= 1958 FIFA World Cup qualification (CONMEBOL) =

FIFA World Cup qualification (CONMEBOL)
Tournament details
- Dates: 13 April 1957 — 27 October 1957
- Teams: 8 (from 1 confederation)

Tournament statistics
- Matches played: 14
- Goals scored: 39 (2.79 per match)
- Attendance: 529,460 (37,819 per match)
- Top scorer(s): (Argentina) Omar Oreste Corbatta (Argentina) Norberto Menéndez (Bolivia) Máximo Alcócer (Paraguay) Juan Bautista Agüero (Paraguay) Florencio Amarilla (3 goals)

The South American section of the 1958 FIFA World Cup qualification saw 8 teams competing 3 berths in the finals.

== Format ==
The 9 teams were divided into 3 groups of 3 teams each. The teams played against each other on a home-and-away basis with the group winners qualifying for the final tournament.

== Groups ==
=== Group 1 ===
Pos	Team	Pld	W	D	L	GF	GA	GR	Pts	Qualification	Brazil national football team	Peru national football team	(Venezuela)
1	Brazil	2	1	1	0	2	1	2.000	3	Qualification to 1958 FIFA World Cup	—	1–0	
2	Peru	2	0	1	1	1	2	0.500	1		1–1	—	—
3	Venezuela	0	0	0	0	0	0	—	0	Withdrew	—	—	—

Source: FIFA

(Venezuela withdrew)

=== Group 2 ===
Pos	Team	Pld	W	D	L	GF	GA	GR	Pts	Qualification	Argentina national football team	Bolivia national football team	Chile national football team
1	Argentina	4	3	0	1	10	2	5.000	6	Qualification to 1958 FIFA World Cup	—	4–0	4–0
2	Bolivia	4	2	0	2	6	6	1.000	4		2–0	—	3–0
3	Chile	4	1	0	3	2	10	0.200	2		0–2	2–1	—

Source: FIFA

=== Group 3 ===
Pos	Team	Pld	W	D	L	GF	GA	GR	Pts	Qualification	Paraguay national football team	Uruguay national football team	Colombia national football team
1	Paraguay	4	3	0	1	11	4	2.750	6	Qualification to 1958 FIFA World Cup	—	5–0	3–0
2	Uruguay	4	2	1	1	4	6	0.667	5		2–0	—	1–0
3	Colombia	4	0	1	3	3	8	0.375	1		2–3	1–1	—

== Qualified Teams ==
Team	Qualified as	Qualified on	Previous appearances in FIFA World Cup^{1}
Brazil	Group 1 winners	21 April 1957	5 (1930, 1934, 1938, 1950, 1954)
Argentina	Group 2 winners	27 October 1957	2 (1930, 1934)
Paraguay	Group 3 winners	8 July 1957	2 (1930, 1950)

^{1} Bold indicates champions for that year. Italic indicates hosts for that year.

== Goalscorers ==
3 goals

- (Argentina) Omar Oreste Corbatta
- (Argentina) Norberto Menéndez
- (Bolivia) Máximo Alcócer
- (Paraguay) Juan Bautista Agüero
- (Paraguay) Florencio Amarilla

2 goals

- (Argentina) Roberto Zárate
- (Paraguay) Ángel Jara Saguier
- (Paraguay) Enrique Jara Saguier

1 goal

- (Argentina) Norberto Conde
- (Argentina) Eliseo Prado
- (Bolivia) Ricardo Alcón
- (Bolivia) Ausberto García
- (Bolivia) Máximo Ramírez
- (Brazil) Didi
- (Brazil) Índio
- (Chile) Guillermo Díaz
- (Chile) Jaime Ramírez
- (Colombia) Carlos Arango
- (Colombia) Ricardo Díaz
- (Colombia) Jaime Gutiérrez
- (Paraguay) Óscar Aguilera
- (Peru) Alberto Terry
- (Uruguay) Javier Ambrois
- (Uruguay) Eladio Benítez
- (Uruguay) William Martínez
- (Uruguay) Óscar Míguez
