= Football at the 1951 Pan American Games – Men's team squads =

The football tournament at the 1951 Pan American was an international football tournament in Argentina from 27 February to 7 March 1951. The age listed for each player is on 27 February, the first day of the tournament. The numbers of caps and goals listed for each player do not include any matches played after the start of the tournament. The club listed is the club for which the player last played a competitive match before the tournament. The nationality for each club reflects the national association (not the league) to which the club is affiliated. A flag is included for coaches who are of a different nationality than their own national team.:

== Argentina ==
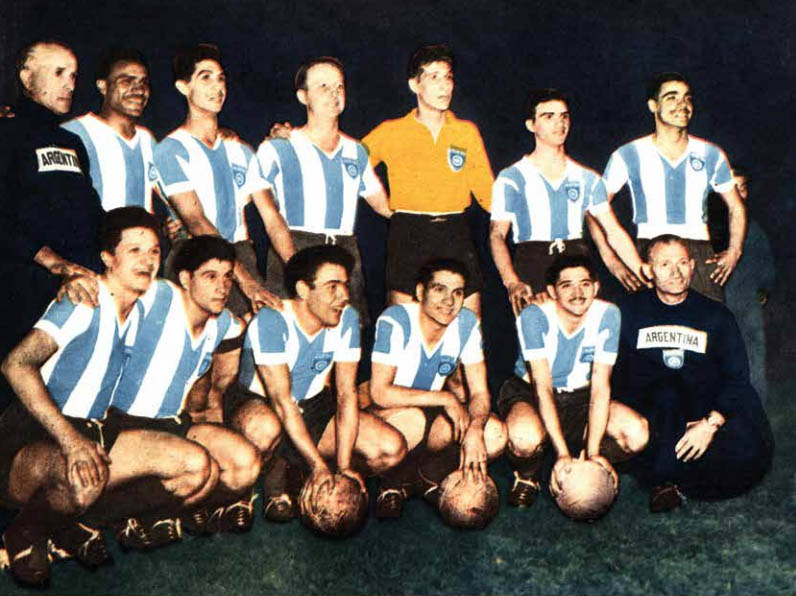
The Argentina squad for the 1951 Pan American Games

Head Coach: Guillermo Stábile

| No. | Pos. | Player | Date of birth (age) | Caps | Goals | Club |
|---|---|---|---|---|---|---|
| | GK | Rogelio Antonio Domínguez | 9 March 1931 (aged 19) | 0 | 0 | (Argentine Football Association) Racing Club |
| | GK | Arturo Rodenak | 13 April 1931 (aged 19) | 0 | 0 | (Argentine Football Association) Gimnasia LP |
| | DF | Juan Carlos Gini | | | | (Argentine Football Association) San Lorenzo |
| | DF | Perfecto Seijo | | | | (Argentine Football Association) Banfield |
| | DF | Jorge Moussegne | | | | (Argentine Football Association) Independiente |
| | DF | Ángel Rubén Ambrosi | 8 March 1930 (aged 20) | | | (Argentine Football Association) Gimnasia LP |
| | DF | Alejandro Simión | 1930 (aged 20–21) | | | (Argentine Football Association) Chacarita Juniors |
| | DF | Enrique Olivero | | | | (Argentine Football Association) Gimnasia LP |
| | MF | Manuel Julián Miranda | 28 January 1931 (aged 20) | | | (Argentine Football Association) Gimnasia LP |
| | MF | Roberto Comaschi | | | | (Argentine Football Association) Quilmes |
| | MF | Osvaldo Vallone | | | | (Argentine Football Association) Racing Club |
| | MF | Roberto Infantino | | | | (Argentine Football Association) Ferro Carril Oeste |
| | FW | José Pellejero | 16 August 1935 (aged 15) | | | (Argentine Football Association) Estudiantes de La Plata |
| | FW | Juan Carlos Mendiburu | 11 July 1939 (aged 11) | | | (Argentine Football Association) Vélez Sarsfield |
| | FW | René Seghini | 26 February 1931 (aged 20) | | | (Argentine Football Association) Boca Juniors |
| | FW | Alfredo Raúl Martínez | 4 April 1930 (aged 20) | | | (Argentine Football Association) Boca Juniors |
| | FW | Norberto Cupo | 8 July 1932 (aged 18) | | | (Argentine Football Association) Racing Club |
| | FW | Miguel Ángel Baiocco | 30 September 1930 (aged 20) | | | (Argentine Football Association) Estudiantes de La Plata |
| | FW | Juan Intini | 11 January 1932 (aged 19) | | | (Argentine Football Association) Rosario Central |
| | FW | Ángel Carlos Cuchero | | | | (Argentine Football Association) Ferro Carril Oeste |
| | FW | José Giarrizo | 5 August 1932 (aged 18) | | | (Argentine Football Association) San Lorenzo |
| | FW | José Giarrizo | 2 January 1931 (aged 20) | | | (Argentine Football Association) Lanús |

== Chile ==
The Chile squad for the 1951 Pan American Games

Head Coach: Luis Tirado

| No. | Pos. | Player | Date of birth (age) | Caps | Goals | Club |
|---|---|---|---|---|---|---|
| | GK | Rubén Pizarro | 10 April 1931 (aged 19) | | | (Football Federation of Chile) Deportivo Viña del Mar |
| | GK | Alberto Cerda Castro | | | | (Football Federation of Chile) Cuarta Zona |
| | DF | Domingo Massaro | | | | (Football Federation of Chile) Sportivo Italiano |
| | DF | Óscar Mogollones | | | | (Football Federation of Chile) Small Star |
| | DF | Jorge García Cuevas | | | | (Football Federation of Chile) María Elena |
| | MF | Isaac Carrasco | 14 August 1928 (aged 22) | | | (Football Federation of Chile) Naval de Talcahuano |
| | MF | Salvador Arenas | 23 October 1931 (aged 19) | | | (Football Federation of Chile) Universidad de Chile |
| | MF | Mario Labbé | 26 July 1928 (aged 22) | | | (Football Federation of Chile) Luis Matte Larraín |
| | MF | David Buzada | 29 February 1932 (aged 18) | | | (Football Federation of Chile) Universidad Técnica |
| | MF | Hugo Eduardo Núñez | 26 June 1929 (aged 21) | | | (Football Federation of Chile) Universidad de Chile |
| | MF | Luis Alberto Rojas | 20 July 1927 (aged 23) | | | (Football Federation of Chile) Walter Müller |
| | FW | Ernesto Saaverda | 14 July 1924 (aged 26) | | | (Football Federation of Chile) Naval de Talcahuano |
| | FW | Arnoldo Weber | 12 July 1925 (aged 25) | | | (Football Federation of Chile) Naval de Talcahuano |
| | FW | Roberto Apiolaza | 12 July 1925 (aged 25) | | | (Football Federation of Chile) Luis Matte Larraín |
| | FW | Javier Briones | 25 June 1926 (aged 24) | | | (Football Federation of Chile) Copal |
| | FW | Jorge Villablanca | 4 July 1929 (aged 21) | | | (Football Federation of Chile) Copal |
| | FW | Rubén Esquivel | 22 July 1930 (aged 20) | | | (Football Federation of Chile) Deportivo Almagro |
| | FW | Pedro Araya Ferrer | 30 May 1928 (aged 22) | | | (Football Federation of Chile) Small Star |
| | FW | Gerardo Valenzuela | 15 April 1916 (aged 34) | | | (Football Federation of Chile) Diva |
| | FW | Sergio González | 1 March 1930 (aged 20) | | | (Football Federation of Chile) Naval de Talcahuano |

== Costa Rica ==
The Costa Rica squad for the 1951 Pan American Games

Head Coach: Ricardo Saprissa

| No. | Pos. | Player | Date of birth (age) | Caps | Goals | Club |
|---|---|---|---|---|---|---|
| | GK | Carlos Alvarado Villalobos | 11 December 1927 (aged 23) | | | (Costa Rican Football Federation) Alajuelense |
| | GK | Rodolfo Sanabria | 7 December 1930 (aged 20) | | | (Costa Rican Football Federation) Saprissa |
| | DF | Mario Cordero | 7 April 1930 (aged 20) | | | (Costa Rican Football Federation) Saprissa |
| | DF | Alex Sánchez | 20 July 1930 (aged 20) | | | (Costa Rican Football Federation) Saprissa |
| | DF | Nelson Morera | | | | (Costa Rican Football Federation) Alajuelense |
| | DF | José Luis Quesada | | | | (Costa Rican Football Federation) Alajuelense |
| | DF | León Alvarado | 30 March 1925 (aged 25) | | | (Costa Rican Football Federation) Herediano |
| | MF | Elías Valenciano | 4 April 1925 (aged 25) | | | (Costa Rican Football Federation) Alajuelense |
| | MF | Tulio Quirós | 7 August 1930 (aged 20) | | | (Costa Rican Football Federation) Saprissa |
| | MF | Héctor Julio González | | | | (Costa Rican Football Federation) Alajuelense |
| | MF | Evelio Alpizar | | | | (Costa Rican Football Federation) Gimnástica Española |
| | MF | Sigifredo Alvarado | | | | (Costa Rican Football Federation) Orión |
| | FW | Álvaro Murillo | 24 November 1930 (aged 20) | | | (Costa Rican Football Federation) Saprissa |
| | FW | Rodolfo Herrera González | 11 August 1931 (aged 19) | | | (Costa Rican Football Federation) Saprissa |
| | FW | Miguel Ángel Zeledón | | | | (Costa Rican Football Federation) Alajuelense |
| | FW | José Manuel Retana | | | | (Costa Rican Football Federation) Alajuelense |
| | FW | Felo García | 30 July 1928 (aged 22) | | | (Costa Rican Football Federation) Alajuelense |
| | FW | Alberto Armijo | 27 September 1926 (aged 24) | | | (Costa Rican Football Federation) UCR |
| | FW | Walker Rodríguez | | | | (Costa Rican Football Federation) Orión |
| | FW | Rafael Campos | | | | (Costa Rican Football Federation) La Libertad |
| | FW | Jorge Quesada | | | | (Costa Rican Football Federation) Orión |
| | FW | Raúl Jiménez | | | | (Costa Rican Football Federation) Cartaginés |

== Paraguay ==
Head Coach: Unknown

| No. | Pos. | Player | Date of birth (age) | Caps | Goals | Club |
|---|---|---|---|---|---|---|
| | GK | Rubén Noceda | 11 May 1931 (aged 19) | | | (Paraguayan Football Association) Presidente Hayes |
| | DF | Pastor Miño | | | | (Paraguayan Football Association) Nacional |
| | DF | Agustín Miranda | 1 January 1930 (aged 21) | | | (Paraguayan Football Association) Cerro Porteño |
| | DF | Cándido Duarte | | | | (Paraguayan Football Association) Presidente Hayes |
| | MF | Adolfo Vaccaro | 9 December 1927 (aged 23) | | | (Paraguayan Football Association) Olimpia |
| | MF | Alfonso Colman | | | | (Paraguayan Football Association) Sport Colombia |
| | MF | Francisco León | | | | (Paraguayan Football Association) Sport Colombia |
| | FW | Silvio Parodi | 6 November 1931 (aged 19) | | | (Paraguayan Football Association) Sportivo Luqueño |
| | FW | Antonio Ramón Gómez | | | | (Paraguayan Football Association) Libertad |
| | FW | Silvio Parodi | 6 November 1931 (aged 19) | | | (Paraguayan Football Association) Sportivo Luqueño |
| | FW | Eligio Insfrán | 27 October 1935 (aged 15) | | | (Paraguayan Football Association) Guaraní |
| | FW | J. Alcaraz | | | | (Paraguayan Football Association) Sport Colombia |
| | FW | R. Carballo | | | | (Paraguayan Football Association) Sport Colombia |
| | FW | Antonio Duarte | | | | (Paraguayan Football Association) Sport Colombia |
| | | J. L. Pirris | | | | (Paraguayan Football Association) Sport Colombia |
| | | V. Torrales | | | | (Paraguayan Football Association) Sport Colombia |
| | | C. Maíz | | | | (Paraguayan Football Association) Sport Colombia |
| | | Eladio Cabrera | | | | (Paraguayan Football Association) Sport Colombia |
| | | J. Álvarez | | | | (Paraguayan Football Association) Sport Colombia |
| | | Chillo | | | | (Paraguayan Football Association) |

== Venezuela ==
The Venezuela squad for the 1951 Pan American Games.

Head Coach: (Brazil) Orlando Fantoni

| No. | Pos. | Player | Date of birth (age) | Caps | Goals | Club |
|---|---|---|---|---|---|---|
| | GK | Policarpo Espejo | | | | (Venezuelan Football Federation) UCV |
| | GK | Pedro Delfino | | | | (Venezuelan Football Federation) La Salle |
| | GK | Freddy Brant (Note: Player would ultimately not travel with the team.) | 13 September 1928 (aged 22) | | | (Venezuelan Football Federation) La Salle |
| | DF | Manuel Antonio Pérez | | | | (Venezuelan Football Federation) UCV |
| | DF | David Zamudio | | | | (Venezuelan Football Federation) Unión Española de Lara |
| | DF | Rafael Márquez | | | | (Venezuelan Football Federation) UCV |
| | DF | César Bello | | | | (Venezuelan Football Federation) Dos Caminos |
| | MF | Marco Eugenio | | | | (Venezuelan Football Federation) Loyola |
| | MF | Luis Osorio | | | | (Venezuelan Football Federation) UCV |
| | MF | Hely Olivares | 13 February 1929 (aged 22) | | | (Venezuelan Football Federation) La Salle |
| | MF | Rafael Campos | | | | (Venezuelan Football Federation) Loyola |
| | MF | Carlos González | | | | (Venezuelan Football Federation) Dos Caminos |
| | MF | Gustavo López | | | | (Venezuelan Football Federation) Unión Española de Lara |
| | MF | Leopoldo Moreno | | | | (Venezuelan Football Federation) Loyola |
| | MF | Luis Palacios | | | | (Venezuelan Football Federation) UCV |
| | FW | Ernesto Blanco | | | | (Venezuelan Football Federation) UCV |
| | FW | César Díaz | | | | (Venezuelan Football Federation) Loyola |
| | FW | Preston Bunicardi | | | | (Venezuelan Football Federation) Bolivarian Military University |
| | FW | Gastón Monterola | | | | (Venezuelan Football Federation) Loyola |
| | FW | Enrique Rodríguez | | | | (Venezuelan Football Federation) Dos Caminos |
| | FW | Odoardo Mendoza | | | | (Venezuelan Football Federation) Unión Española de Lara |
