= Benčić =

Benčić (pronounced [bêːntʃitɕ]) is a Croatian and Serbian surname. It is the most common surname in Istria County in Croatia. Notable people with the surname include:

- Irma Benčić (died 1945), Croatian resistance fighter
- Ljubo Benčić (1905–1992), Croatian and Yugoslav footballer
- Sandra Benčić (born 1978), Croatian activist and politician
- Vojkan Benčić (born 1969), Serbian basketball player and coach

== See also ==
- Bencic
- Benčič, Slovak surname
- Bencsics, Hungarian spelling of the surname
