= Valero Iriarte =

Spanish painter

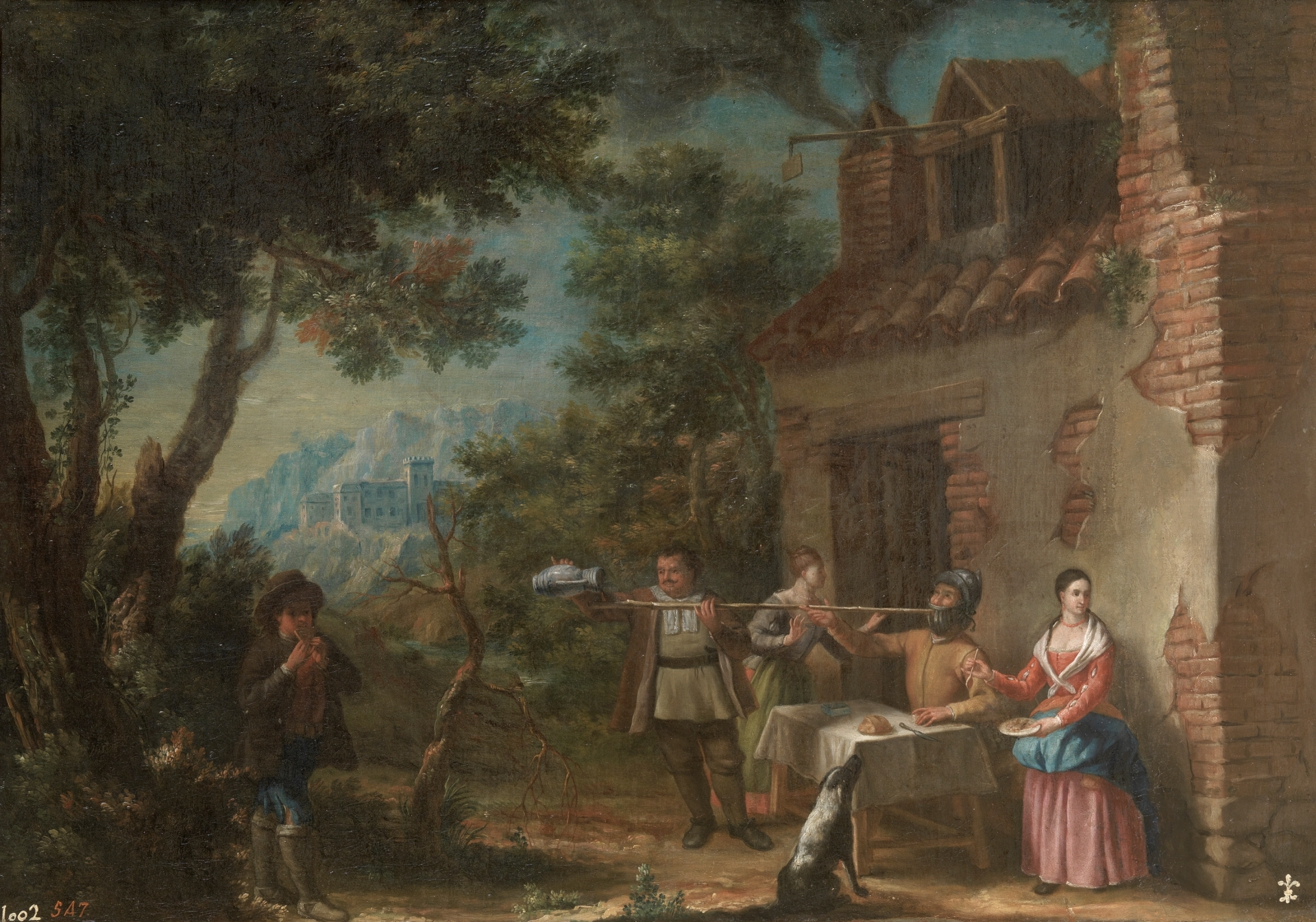
Don Quixote at the Inn

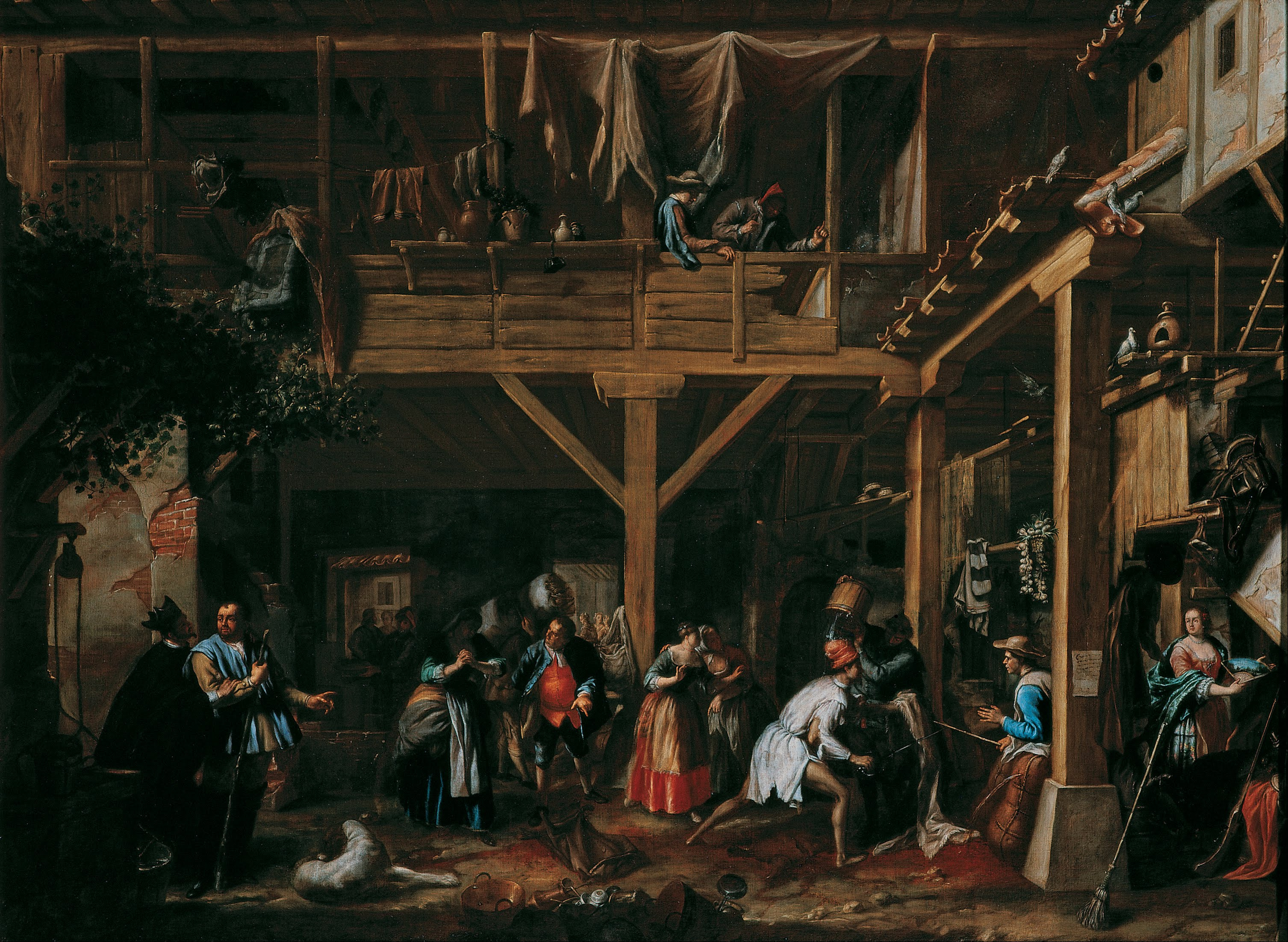
Don Quixote's Battle with the Wineskins

Valero Iriarte (c. 1680, Zaragoza - c. 1753, Madrid) was a Spanish Baroque painter; specializing in portraits.

== Life and work ==
While still a young man, he left home and went to Madrid. In 1711, after creating a portrait of Louis, the Prince of Asturias, then only four years old, he was given free access to the palace and received numerous commissions from King Philip V and his wife, Elisabeth Farnese. In 1720, he applied for the position of "Painter to the King", made vacant by the death of Nicolò Maria Vaccaro, but did not receive the appointment. Two years later, the Council of Castile appointed him "Appraiser of Antique Paintings".

Although trained in the conventional Baroque style, he was exposed to the works of French painters at the court; especially notable in the backgrounds of three scenes from Don Quixote which were commissioned by Elisabeth. Two are now in the Museo del Prado and one is in the possession of the Fundación Banco Santander.

Many of his portraits, done in traditional style, show the influence of Juan Carreño de Miranda, but also incorporate novelties he acquired from the French portraitists, Jean Ranc and Michel-Ange Houasse, which made him popular among the bourgeoisie as well as the aristocracy. Some of his portraits, notably those of the doctors Martín Martínez and José Cervi, were issued as engravings by Juan Bernabé Palomino.
