= Arne Eriksson =

Finnish football referee (1916–1983)

- Full name: Aarne Eriksson
- Born: 15 January 1916; Jakobstad, Finland
- Died: 1 August 1983 (aged 67)

International
Years	League	Role
1955–1958	FIFA	Referee

Aarne (Arne) Eriksson (15 January 1916 – 1 August 1983) was a Finnish football referee. He was born in Jakobstad. He was a FIFA international referee from 1955 to 1958.

Eriksson is known for supervising one match in the 1958 FIFA World Cup and assisting another. Arne Eriksson along with Tapio Yli-Karro are the only Finnish referees appointed to the World Cup finals so far.

== International matches ==
Date	Venue	Competition	Teams	Result	Assignment
11 September 1955	Ullevaal Stadion, Oslo	Nordic Championship	Norway vs. Denmark	1–1	Referee
15 June 1958	Jernvallen, Sandviken	FIFA World Cup	Hungary vs. Mexico	4–0	Referee
17 June 1958	Råsunda Stadium, Solna	FIFA World Cup	Wales vs. Hungary	2–1	Assistant referee
