= Benčič =

Benčič, feminine form Benčičová, is a Slovak surname and a Slovene surname. Notable people with the name include:

- Alfréd Benčič (1930-1997), Slovak film editor, known for Pictures of the Old World, Rosy Dreams
- Anton Benčič, one of the first proponents of the Slovak language, born in Vištuk in 1745
- Dragomir Benčič (1911–1967), Slovene civil engineer, World War II partisan, and general

== See also ==
- Belinda Bencic (born 1997), Swiss tennis player
- Bencic
- Benčić
- Bencsics, Hungarian spelling of the surname
