= Ricardo Diaz =

Ricardo Diaz may refer to:

- Ricardo Diaz (comics), a DC Comics character
- Ricardo Diaz (Arrowverse), the Arrowverse version of the character
- Ricardo Diaz (Grand Theft Auto: Vice City), a character in Grand Theft Auto: Vice City
- Ricardo Díaz (footballer), Salvadoran footballer
