= Vaccaro =

Vaccaro is a surname. Notable people with the surname include:

- Adolfo Vaccaro (1927–2020), Paraguayan football player and coach
- Alessandra Melucco Vaccaro (1940–2000), Italian historian and archaeologist
- Andrea Vaccaro (1600–1670), Neapolitan painter of the Baroque period
- Angelo Vaccaro (born 1981), Italian football player
- Brenda Vaccaro (born 1939), American actress
- Cris Vaccaro (born 1958), American professional soccer player
- Domenico Antonio Vaccaro (1678–1745), Neapolitan painter, sculptor and architect
- Francesco Vaccaro (footballer) (born 1999), Italian footballer
- Francesco Vaccaro (painter) (c. 1636–1675), Bolognese painter and engraver of the Baroque period
- Giuseppe Vaccaro (1896-1970), Italian architect
- Joan Vaccaro (born 1956), Australian physicist
- Kenny Vaccaro (born 1991), American former National Football League player
- Laura Vaccaro Seeger, American children's books author and artist
- Leopold Saverio Vaccaro (1887–1963), American surgeon who raised money for the reconstruction of post-World War I Italy
- Lorenzo Vaccaro (1655–1706), Neapolitan late-Baroque sculptor
- Luciana Vaccaro (born 1969), Italian-Swiss physicist
- Luigi Vaccaro (born 1991), Belgian football player
- Mike Vaccaro, sports columnist for The New York Post
- Nicolò Maria Vaccaro (1659–1720), Italian Baroque painter
- Rodney Vaccaro (born 1952) American screenwriter and film producer
- Sonny Vaccaro (born 1939), American sports marketing executive
- Tony Vaccaro (1922–2022), American photographer
- Tracy Vaccaro (born 1962), Playboy Playmate of the Month for October 1983
- Vaccaro brothers, Italian-American banana businessmen Joseph, Felix and Luca Vaccaro
