= Zaccaro =

Zaccaro is a surname. Notable people with the surname include:

- John Zaccaro (born 1933), American real estate developer
- Maurizio Zaccaro (born 1952), Italian film director, cinematographer, film editor, and screenwriter
- Stephen Zaccaro (born 1955), American psychology professor

== See also ==
- Vaccaro
