= Bencic =

Bencic is a surname of multiple origins. Notable people with the surname include:

- Belinda Bencic (born 1997), Swiss tennis player

It may also be a spelling without diacritics of the following surnames:

- Benčič, Slovak and Slovene surname
- Benčić,Croatian and Serbian surname

== See also ==
- Bencsics, Hungarian spelling of the surname
