= Jernvallen =

Sports venue in Sandviken, Sweden

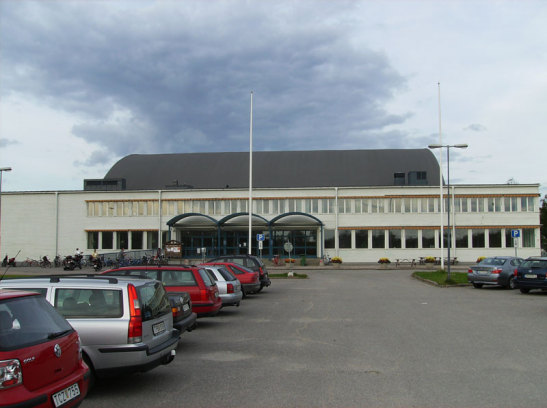
- Interactive map of Jernvallen
- Location: Sandviken, Sweden
- Coordinates: 60°36′32″N 16°46′23″E
- Owner: Jernvallen Drift AB
- Capacity: 7,000

Construction
- Opened: 1938

Tenants
- Sandvikens IF; Sandvikens AIK FK

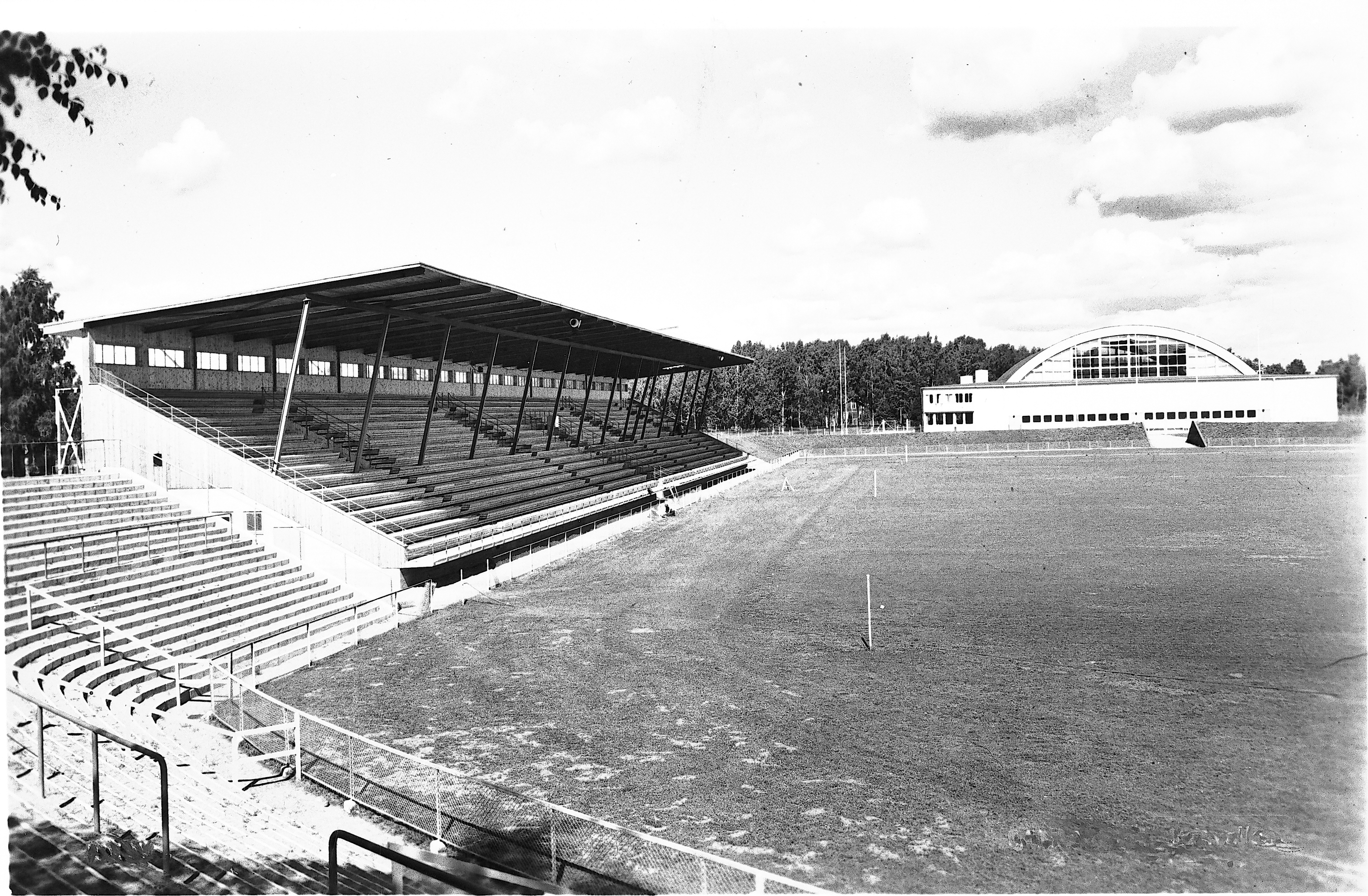
Jernvallen in 1941.

Jernvallen is a multi-use stadium in Sandviken, Sweden. In the 1958 FIFA World Cup there were two matches played at Jernvallen. It has the distinction of being the northernmost stadium to host a World Cup match. It is currently used mostly for football matches. Although the record for the stadium is 20,000 people in 1958, today the stadium holds 7,000 people.

== FIFA World Cup 1958 ==
8 June 1958
19:00 (CET)

Hungary	1 – 1	Wales
Bozsik 5'	Report	J. Charles 27'

Jernvallen, Sandviken
Attendance: 20,000
Referee: Codesal (Uruguay)

15 June 1958
19:00 (CET)

Hungary	4 – 0	Mexico
Tichy 19', 46'; Sándor 54'; Bencsics 69'	Report

Jernvallen, Sandviken
Attendance: 13,300
Referee: Eriksson (Finland)
