= Samuel Aguilar =

Paraguayan footballer (1933–2013)

Personal information
- Full name: Samuel Aguilar Alvarenga
- Date of birth: 16 March 1933
- Place of birth: Paraguay
- Date of death: 12 May 2013 (aged 80)
- Place of death: Fernando de la Mora, Paraguay
- Height: 1.88 m (6 ft 2 in)
- Position: Goalkeeper

Senior career*
Years	Team	Apps	(Gls)
- Club Libertad
- Club Sport Colombia
- Club Olimpia
1965–1967	Deportivo Pereira	11	(0)

International career
1958–1962	Paraguay	14	(0)
- * Club domestic league appearances and goals

Samuel Aguilar Alvarenga (16 March 1933 – 12 May 2013) was a Paraguayan football goalkeeper who played for Paraguay in the 1958 FIFA World Cup. He also played for Club Libertad. Aguilar died on 12 May 2013, at the age of 80.
