= Claudio Lezcano =

Paraguayan footballer (died 1999)

Personal information
- Full name: Claudio Lezcano López
- Place of birth: Paraguay
- Date of death: 29 August 1999
- Position: Forward

Senior career*
Years	Team	Apps	(Gls)
- Club Olimpia

International career
- Paraguay
- * Club domestic league appearances and goals

Claudio Lezcano López (died 29 August 1999) was a Paraguayan football forward who played for Paraguay in the 1958 FIFA World Cup. He also played for Club Olimpia. Lezcano died on 29 August 1999.
