= André Lerond =

French footballer (1930-2018)

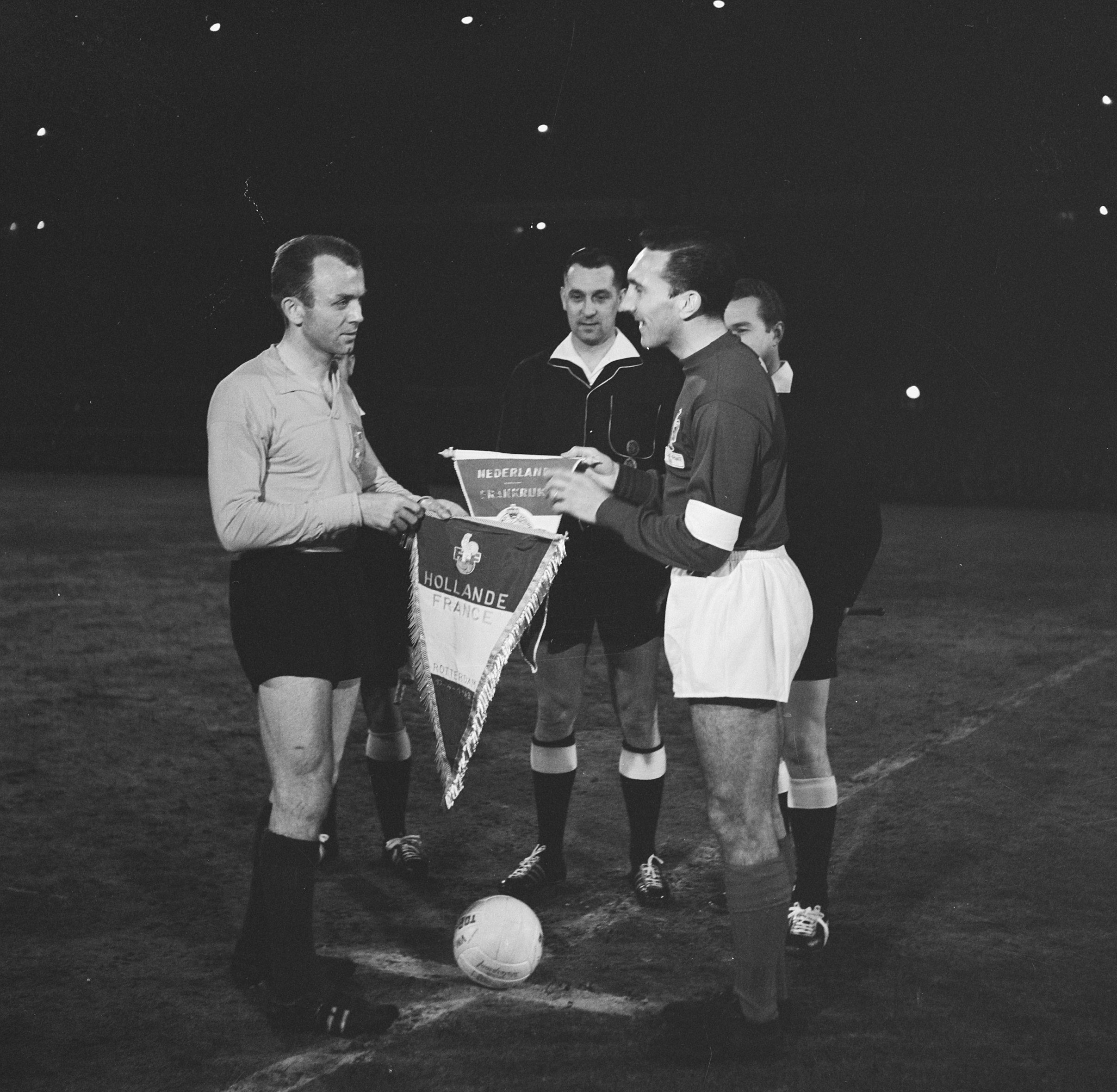
- Lerond changes pennants w. Fons van Wissen (1963)

Personal information
- Full name: André Lerond
- Date of birth: 6 December 1930
- Place of birth: Le Havre, France
- Date of death: 8 April 2018 (aged 87)
- Place of death: Bron, France
- Position: Sweeper

Youth career
- 1941–1949: Coutances

Senior career*
Years	Team	Apps	(Gls)
1951	Cannes	10	(?)
1951–1959	Lyon	246	(3)
1959–1963	Stade Français	144	(2)

International career
1957–1963	France	31	(0)
Medal record
Representing France
FIFA World Cup
Third place	1958 Sweden
- * Club domestic league appearances and goals

André Lerond (6 December 1930 – 8 April 2018) was a French footballer who played as a defender. He played mainly as a centre back or at left back, and occasionally as a left half. He was part of the French national teams of the 1950s. According to France Football in 2007, Lerond was "of average size, but extremely quick, a great technician, calm and always at the right place. He was a very gifted footballer." He captained the France national team 14 times. He died on 8 April 2018 at the age of 87.

== Honours ==
=== International ===
France

- FIFA World Cup (3rd Place): 1958

=== Individudal ===
- French Player of the Year: 1962
