= Irma Benčić =

Croatian partisan

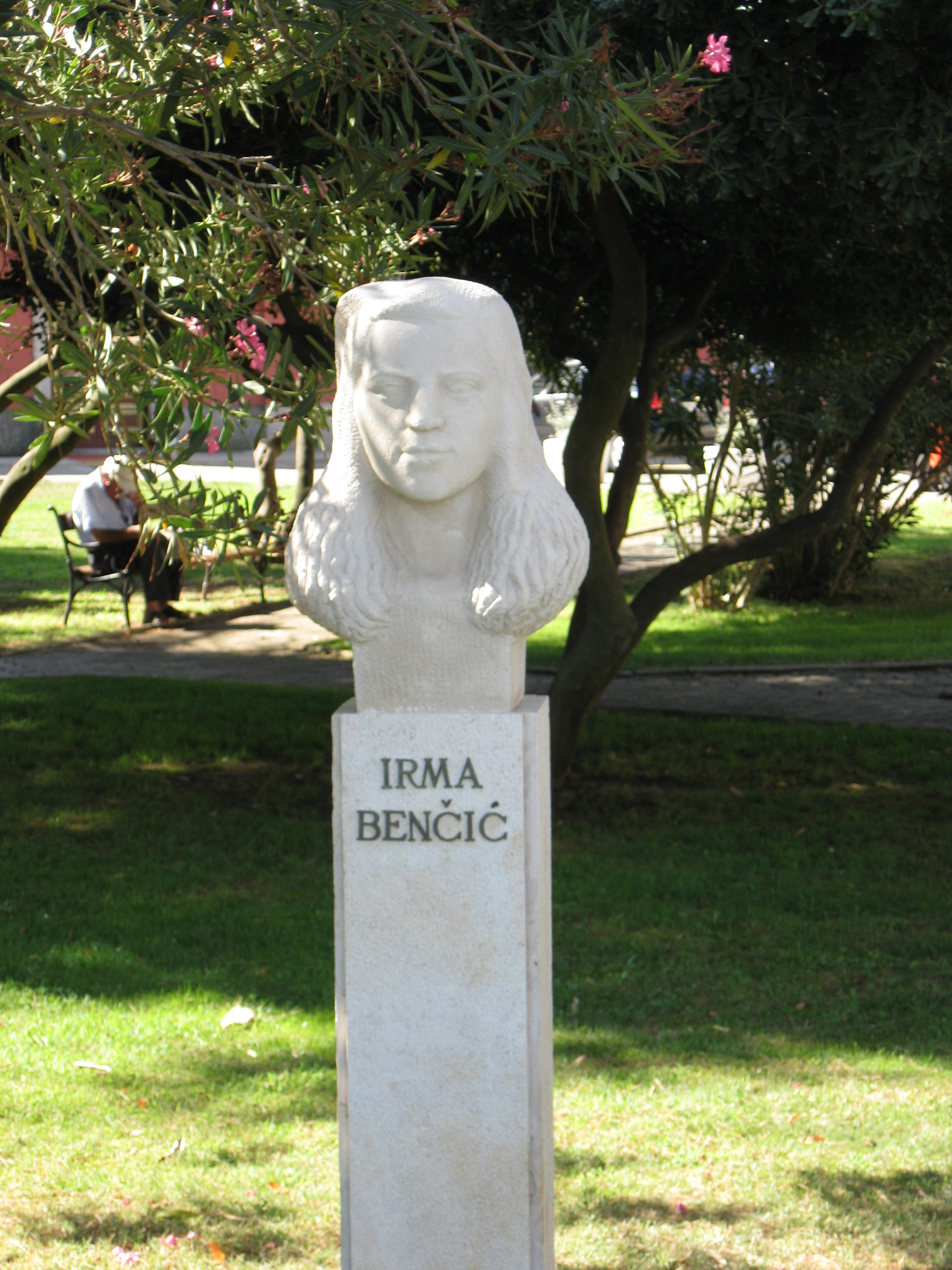
A bust of Irma Benčić in Novigrad, Croatia

Irma Benčić was a Croat partisan and anti-fascist. She was active in the Istrian resistance movement against an occupying German army during World War II. Benčić was killed in March 1945 by the Germans; her efforts to liberate Istra are commemorated by a memorial park in her name, as well with an annual ceremony, decrying fascism and laying wreaths.

== Biography ==
Irma Benčić was a native of Istria Province, part of modern-day Croatia; during Irma's lifetime, the province was part of [Italy]. When Nazi Germany invaded Yugoslavia in 1940, a resistance movement, later widely referred to as the NOP (hr), was formed in Istria to oppose the German occupiers of the Operational Zone of the Adriatic Littoral. Benčić joined the partisans during the conflict, actively resisting against the Germans.

On the night of 1 March 1945, she met with other freedom fighters, her father, Anton, and another freedom fighter, Antun Ružić from Labin, and the three were killed by a bomb dropped the German army in Novigrad, two months before the city was liberated by the advancing Yugoslav army.

== Memorial ==
A bust of Benčić is displayed in a memorial park named after her in Novigrad. There is an annual commemoration of her actions at the park at the beginning of March, which focusses on her status as a young woman fighting for freedom, decrying fascism and bigotry. The ceremony includes laying of wreaths at the site of her death and at her memorial, followed by speeches and artistic presentations from local schools and choirs at the local Centre for Events and Culture.
