= Eligio Echagüe =

Paraguayan footballer (1938–2009)

Personal information
- Full name: Eligio Silvestre Echagüe Delgado
- Date of birth: 31 December 1938
- Place of birth: Concepción, Paraguay
- Date of death: 6 December 2009 (aged 70)
- Place of death: Lambaré, Paraguay
- Height: 1.70 m (5 ft 7 in)
- Position: Defender

Youth career
- 1946: Club Adolfo Riquelme
- 1947–1959: Olimpia

Senior career*
Years	Team	Apps	(Gls)
1950–1960	Olimpia	?	(?)

International career
	Paraguay	?	(?)
- * Club domestic league appearances and goals

Eligio Silvestre Echagüe Delgado (31 December 1938 – 6 December 2009) was a Paraguayan football defender; most commonly playing in the left-back position.

== Career ==
Echagüe started his career at Club Adolfo Riquelme from his hometown, Concepción. In 1947, he was transferred to Olimpia Asunción and made his debut in the first team squad in 1950. He was part of the Olimpia team that won five consecutive titles coached then by the great Aurelio González. Echagüe played for the Paraguay national football team in several occasions, most notably in the 1958 FIFA World Cup.

== Titles ==
Season	Team	Title
1956	Olimpia	Paraguayan 1st division
1957	Olimpia	Paraguayan 1st division
1958	Olimpia	Paraguayan 1st division
1959	Olimpia	Paraguayan 1st division
1960	Olimpia	Paraguayan 1st division
