= Jorge Romero (footballer) =

Paraguayan footballer (born 1932)

Personal information
- Full name: Jorge Lino Romero Santa Cruz
- Date of birth: 23 September 1932 (age 94)
- Place of birth: Paraguay
- Position: Forward

Senior career*
Years	Team	Apps	(Gls)
1950–1955	Sportivo Luqueño		
1956	Libertad		
1956–1958	Sol de América		
1958–1961	Real Oviedo	29	(8)

International career
1958	Paraguay	3	(2)
- * Club domestic league appearances and goals

Jorge Lino Romero Santa Cruz (born 23 September 1932) is a Paraguayan football forward who played for Paraguay in the 1958 FIFA World Cup. He also played for Club Sol de América and Real Oviedo.
