= Adolfo Vaccaro =

Paraguayan footballer and coach (1927–2020)

Personal information
- Full name: Adolfo Aníbal Vaccaro Mena
- Date of birth: 9 December 1927
- Place of birth: Asunción, Paraguay
- Date of death: 16 January 2020 (aged 92)
- Position: Winger

Youth career
- 1946: General Genes

Senior career*
| Years | Team | Apps | (Gls) |
| 1947–1950 | Atlántida SC | ? | (?) |
| 1951–1954 | Olimpia | ? | (?) |
| 1955 | General Genes | ? | (?) |

International career
| 1951 | Paraguay | ? | (?) |
- * Club domestic league appearances and goals

Adolfo Aníbal Vaccaro Mena (9 December 1927 – 16 January 2020) was a Paraguayan football midfielder/forward and coach.

Vaccaro started his career at General Genes in his neighborhood of Villa Morra. He then went on to play for Atlántida SC and Olimpia Asunción before finishing his career in General Genes in 1955 where he played the role of player/manager and helped the team win the second division tournament in 1955, thus being promoted.

Other teams that he managed include Sportivo Clorinda (Argentina, 1961), 22 de Setiembre of Encarnación (1962), General Caballero de Cnel. Bogado (1964), Capitán Alfonso del Puerto de Misiones (1967) and Atlético Posadas de (from Posadas, Argentina).

Vaccaro died on 16 January 2020, at the age of 92.
