= Salvador Villalba =

Paraguayan footballer (1924–2021)

Personal information
- Date of birth: 29 August 1924
- Place of birth: Paraguay
- Date of death: December 2021 (aged 97)
- Position: Midfielder

Senior career*
Years	Team	Apps	(Gls)
- Club Libertad

International career
- Paraguay
- * Club domestic league appearances and goals

Salvador Villalba (29 August 1924 – December 2021) was a Paraguayan football midfielder who played for Paraguay in the 1958 FIFA World Cup. He also played for Club Libertad.

On 26 December 2021, the Paraguayan Football Association (APF) reported his death, at the age of 97.
