= Salvador (footballer) =

Brazilian footballer

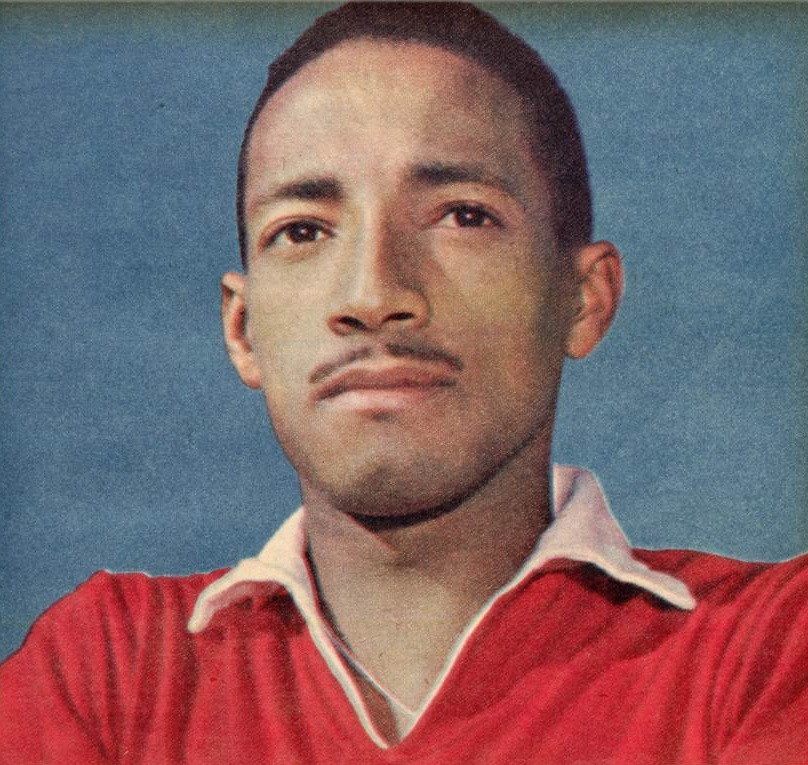

Personal information
- Full name: Milton Alves da Silva
- Date of birth: October 16, 1930
- Place of birth: Porto Alegre, Brazil
- Date of death: January 1, 1973 (aged 41)
- Place of death: São Paulo, Brazil
- Position: Defender

Senior career*
Years	Team	Apps	(Gls)
1949	Corinthians-RS		
1950–1955	Internacional		
1955–1960	Peñarol		
1961–1962	River Plate		
1962	→ San Telmo (loan)		
1963	Metropol		
Medal record
First place	Campeonato Gaúcho	1952
First place	Campeonato Gaúcho	1953
First place	Campeonato Gaúcho	1955
First place	Uruguayan Primera División	1958
First place	Uruguayan Primera División	1959
First place	Uruguayan Primera División	1960
First place	Copa Libertadores	1960
- * Club domestic league appearances and goals

Mílton Alves da Silva (born October 16, 1930 - 1979), known as Salvador, was a Brazilian former football player. He was born in Porto Alegre, Brazil, and played for clubs in Brazil, Argentina and Uruguay. He died in São Paulo.

== Titles ==
- Internacional 1950, 1951, 1952 and 1953 (Rio Grande do Sul State Championship)
- Peñarol 1958, 1959 and 1960 (Uruguayan Primera División Championship), 1960 (Copa Libertadores de América)
