= Ignacio Achúcarro =

Paraguayan footballer (1936–2021)

Ignacio Achucarro
Personal information
- Full name: Ignacio Achucarro Ayala
- Date of birth: 31 July 1936
- Place of birth: Asunción, Paraguay
- Date of death: 14 August 2021 (aged 85)
- Position: Defender

Senior career*
Years	Team	Apps	(Gls)
1956–1958	Olimpia		
1958–1968	Sevilla FC	240	(10)
1969–1970	Olimpia		

International career
- Paraguay
- * Club domestic league appearances and goals

Ignacio Achucarro Ayala (31 July 1936 – 14 August 2021) was a Paraguayan footballer. He played as a defender.

== Career ==
Achúcarro started his career in Olimpia Asunción of Paraguay, where he won two national championships before being transferred to Europe in 1958 to play for Sevilla FC. At Sevilla, he would spend 10 years before returning to Paraguay to play for Olimpia for the 1969 and 1970 seasons. Achucarro was part of the Paraguay national football team that qualified and played in the 1958 FIFA World Cup, where he played all three games for Paraguay.

== Death ==
Achúcarro died in August 2021, at the age of 85.

== Titles ==
Season	Team	Title
1956	Olimpia	Paraguayan 1st division
1957	Olimpia	Paraguayan 1st division
