= Juan Lezcano =

Paraguayan footballer (1937–2012)

Personal information
- Full name: Juan Vicente Lezcano López
- Date of birth: 5 April 1937
- Place of birth: Asunción, Paraguay
- Date of death: 6 February 2012 (aged 74)

Senior career*
Years	Team	Apps	(Gls)
1954-1960	Olimpia		
1961-1967	Peñarol		
1968-1969	Colón	70	(0)

International career
1957-1963	Paraguay	26	(0)
- * Club domestic league appearances and goals

Juan Vicente Lezcano López (5 April 1937 – 6 February 2012) was a Paraguayan football defender.

== Career ==
Lezcano started his career at Olimpia of Asunción in 1954. He was part of the historical Olimpia team coached by Aurelio González that won five Paraguayan league championships in a row, from 1956 to 1960 and reached the final of the first edition of the Copa Libertadores in 1960, where Olimpia lost against Peñarol of Uruguay. Soon after in 1961, Peñarol signed him and became one of the key players of the Uruguayan club along with other stars such as Alberto Spencer, Pedro Rocha and Ladislao Mazurkiewicz that helped Peñarol win several national and international championships. In 1968, he played for Colón de Santa Fe of Argentina.

Lezcano made 26 appearances for the Paraguay national football team, and was part of the squad that qualified for the 1958 World Cup tournament.

== Personal life and death ==
Juan Lezcano was born in the neighbourhood of Santísima Trinidad in Asunción, Paraguay on 5 April 1937. His father, Juan Félix Lezcano, was also a Paraguayan international footballer.

Lezcano died on 6 February 2012, at the age of 74.
