= Héctor Rodríguez (footballer) =

Uruguayan footballer (born 1968)

Héctor Rodríguez Peña
Personal information
- Full name: Héctor Ignacio Rodríguez Peña
- Date of birth: 22 October 1968 (age 58)
- Place of birth: Montevideo, Uruguay
- Height: 1.82 m (6 ft 0 in)
- Position: Defender

Senior career*
Years	Team	Apps	(Gls)
1988–1993	Defensor Sporting		
1993–1995	Deportivo Mandiyú	48	(3)
1995–1998	Colón	82	(6)
1999	Nacional		
2000	Colón	16	(0)
2001	Bella Vista		
2001	América de Cali		
2002	Racing Montevideo		
2003–2004	Everton Viña del Mar		
2005–2007	Uruguay Montevideo		

International career
1991–1997	Uruguay	10	(0)

Managerial career
- 2008–2011: Fénix (youth)
- 2012–2015: Montevideo Wanderers (assistant)
- 2016: Santiago Wanderers (assistant)
- 2016–2018: Emelec (assistant)
- 2018: Bolívar (assistant)
- 2019: Universidad de Chile (assistant)
- 2021–2022: Defensor Sporting
- * Club domestic league appearances and goals

Héctor Ignacio Rodríguez Peña (born 22 October 1968 in Montevideo) is a Uruguayan football manager and former player who played as a central defender.

== Club career ==
Rodríguez Peña played for Deportivo Mandiyú and Colón in the Primera División de Argentina.

== International career ==
Rodríguez Peña made ten appearances for the senior Uruguay national football team from 1991 to 1997, including four 1998 FIFA World Cup qualifying matches. He played for Uruguay at the Copa América 1993.
