= Villa Morra =

Coordinates: 25°17′35″S 57°34′48″W

- Neighbourhood
- Interactive map of Villa Morra
- Country: Paraguay
- Department: Central Department
- Metropolitan area: Gran Asunción
- City: Asunción

Population
  - Total: 5,000

Villa Morra is a neighbourhood of Asunción, the capital of Paraguay. It has a population of 5,000 people. The name "Villa Morra" comes from the family name of one of the first owners of the Asunción Tramways company, Mr. Francisco Morra.

Villa Morra is an upscale commercial and residential neighbourhood. Villa Morra has seen an important development in the last few years with the opening of new high end stores, restaurants, hotels, nightclubs and even banks and financial firms. Some important sites in this barrio include the Senador Long street and the Villa Morra Suites Hotel (built based on the early 20th-century European architecture).
