= Rubén Noceda =

Paraguayan footballer (1931–2007)

Ruben Noceda
Personal information
- Date of birth: 11 May 1931
- Place of birth: Asunción, Paraguay
- Date of death: 8 April 2007 (aged 75)

Senior career*
Years	Team	Apps	(Gls)
1946-1956	Presidente Hayes		
- Atlético Chalaco

International career
1953-1957	Paraguay	4	(0)
Medal record
Representing Paraguay
Copa América
Winner	1953 Peru
- * Club domestic league appearances and goals

Rubén Noceda (11 May 1931 – 8 April 2007) was a Paraguayan footballer who played as a goalkeeper. He was part of the Paraguay national football team that participated in the 1953 Copa America which was eventually won by Paraguay.

== Club career ==
Noceda started his career in the youth divisions of Presidente Hayes and made his debut in the first team squad in 1946. He played for Presidente Hayes until 1956 and won the only Paraguayan 1st division title in the club's history in 1952. Noceda also played for Peruvian club Atlético Chalaco.

== International career ==
Noceda was selected in Paraguay's squad for the 1953 South American Championship. He played two games in the tournament, against Peru on 8 March, his first cap with Paraguay, and against Uruguay on 12 March.

He played two games for the 1958 FIFA World Cup qualification, both against Uruguay on 14 July 1957, and 28 July 1957. The latter was his fourth and last cap with Paraguay.

== Titles ==
Season	Team	Title
1952	(Paraguay) Presidente Hayes	Paraguayan 1st division
1953	Paraguay	Copa América
