= Edelmiro Arévalo =

Paraguayan footballer (1929–2008)

Personal information
- Date of birth: 17 July 1929
- Place of birth: Paraguay
- Date of death: 3 January 2008 (aged 78)
- Position: Defender

Senior career*
Years	Team	Apps	(Gls)
- Club Olimpia

International career
- Paraguay
- * Club domestic league appearances and goals

Edelmiro Arévalo (7 January 1929 – 3 January 2008) was a Paraguayan football defender who played for Paraguay in the 1958 FIFA World Cup. He also played for Club Olimpia. Arévalo died on 3 January 2008, at the age of 78.
