= Eladio Benítez =

Uruguayan footballer (1939–2018)

Personal information
- Full name: Eladio Benítez Amuedo
- Date of birth: 24 February 1939
- Date of death: 23 October 2018 (aged 79)
- Position: Inside left

Senior career*
Years	Team	Apps	(Gls)
1957–1963	Racing Club de Montevideo		
1964	Deportes Temuco		
1965–1967	Green Cross Temuco		
1968	Unión La Calera		
1969-1970	Rangers de Talca		

International career
1957–1962	Uruguay	8	(1)
- * Club domestic league appearances and goals

Eladio Benítez Amuedo (24 February 1939 – 23 October 2018) was a Uruguayan footballer who played as an inside left.

== Career ==
Benítez played professionally between 1957 and 1970 for Racing Club de Montevideo, Deportes Temuco, Green Cross, Unión La Calera and Rangers de Talca.

He earned 8 international caps for Uruguay, and was a squad member at the 1959 South American Championship in Ecuador.
