= José Parodi =

Paraguayan footballer and coach (1932–2006)

Personal information
- Full name: Silvio José del Rosario Parodi Rojas
- Date of birth: 30 August 1932
- Place of birth: Luque, Paraguay
- Date of death: 22 August 2006 (aged 73)
- Position: Striker

Senior career*
Years	Team	Apps	(Gls)
1950–1955	Sportivo Luqueño		
1955–1956	Padova		
1956–1957	Genoa		
1957–1958	Sportivo Luqueño		
1958–1961	Las Palmas		
1961–1967	Nîmes	182	(47)
1967–1969	Mulhouse		

International career
- Paraguay
- * Club domestic league appearances and goals

Silvio José del Rosario Parodi Rojas (30 August 1932 – 22 August 2006) was a Paraguayan football player and coach.

Parodi was born in Luque. He played for Sportivo Luqueño, Calcio Padova, Genoa, UD Las Palmas, Nîmes Olympique and FC Mulhouse. After retiring from football as a player he became a coach and his first managerial job was for the French side FC Mulhouse.

Parodi died on 22 August 2006, at the age of 73. He was buried in his native town of Luque.
