= Juan Bautista Agüero =

Paraguayan footballer (1935–2018)

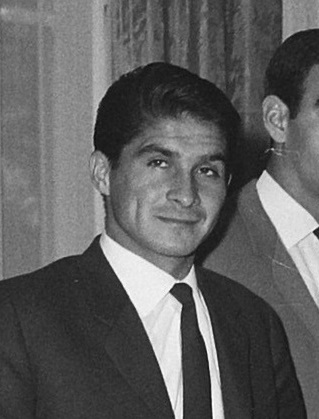

Personal information
- Full name: Juan Bautista Agüero Sánchez
- Date of birth: 24 June 1935
- Place of birth: Caacupé, Paraguay
- Date of death: 27 December 2018 (aged 83)
- Place of death: Caacupé, Paraguay
- Position: Striker

Senior career*
Years	Team	Apps	(Gls)
1955–1958	Olimpia	?	(?)
1958–1965	Sevilla FC	116	(32)
1965–1966	Real Madrid	5	(1)
1966–1967	Granada CF	13	(1)

International career
	Paraguay	35	(19)
- * Club domestic league appearances and goals

Juan Bautista Agüero Sánchez (24 June 1935 – 27 December 2018) was a Paraguayan football striker.

== Career ==
Agüero started his career at Olimpia Asunción, which was at the time coached by the great Aurelio González. There, Agüero won some national championships. He was later transferred to Sevilla FC of Spain, where he would spend 8 years, playing more than 100 games. For the 1965/1966, he signed for Real Madrid and had a brief stint in Granada CF.

Agüero was part of the Paraguay national football team that qualified for and played in the 1958 FIFA World Cup, where he scored two goals for Paraguay.

== Titles ==
Season	Team	Title
1955	Olimpia	Paraguayan 1st division
1956	Olimpia	Paraguayan 1st division
1957	Olimpia	Paraguayan 1st division

Real Madrid

- European Cup: 1965–66
