= Agustín Miranda (footballer, born 1930) =

Paraguayan footballer (born 1930)

Personal information
- Date of birth: 1930 (age 95–96)
- Place of birth: Paraguay
- Position: Defender

Senior career*
Years	Team	Apps	(Gls)
- Cerro Porteño

International career
1951-1958	Paraguay	8	(0)
- * Club domestic league appearances and goals

Agustín Miranda (born 1930) is a Paraguayan football defender who played for Paraguay in the 1958 FIFA World Cup. He also played for Cerro Porteño.
