= Nicolò Maria Vaccaro =

Italian painter

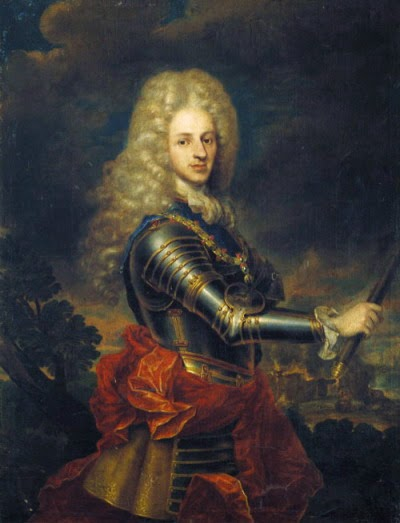
Portrait of Philip V of Spain by Nicolo Vaccaro, c. 1715.

Nicolò Maria Vaccaro (1659–1720) was an Italian Baroque painter who specialised in portraits and worked in Madrid as the court painter of King Philip V of Spain.

Born in Genoa, he worked in Parma at the court of Ranuccio II Farnese, Duke of Parma. As a protégé of Cardinal Giulio Alberoni, he followed the Cardinal to Spain around 1711–1712. Here, he became «Pictor Regius» (Court painter) and made a painting of the King in 1715, which Alberoni sent to his college in Piacenza.

He did not just paint portraits. The Prado museum possesses his Alegoría de la Tierra, painted for the Palacio del Buen Retiro.

Vaccarro died in Madrid.

== Sources ==
- Nicolò Maria Vaccaro, Tracce per i ritratti genovesi, by Daniele Sanguineti
- Museo del Prado
