= Ricardo Díaz (footballer) =

Salvadoran footballer (1939-2011)

Personal information
- Full name: Ricardo Díaz Bach
- Date of birth: 6 September 1939
- Place of birth: Zacatecoluca, La Paz, El Salvador
- Date of death: August 8, 2011
- Place of death: San Salvador, El Salvador
- Position: Striker

Youth career
- –1956: Comunicaciones

Senior career*
| Years | Team | Apps | (Gls) |
| 1962–1964 | Universidad Concepción | | |
| 1965 | Huachipato | | |
| 1966–1967 | Juventud Olímpica | | |
| 1968–1970 | Once Municipal | | |

International career
| 1956 | El Salvador | | |
- * Club domestic league appearances and goals

Ricardo Díaz Bach (6 September 1939 – 8 August 2011) was a Salvadoran footballer.

== Club career ==
Nicknamed el Nene, Díaz played club football in El Salvador, before going to Chile to play professionally at Universidad de Concepción and C.D. Huachipato.

== International career ==
Díaz was part of the El Salvador national football team that won Central American and Caribbean games in 1956.
