= Florencio Amarilla =

Paraguayan footballer (1935–2012)

Personal information
- Full name: Florencio Amarilla Lacasa
- Date of birth: 3 January 1935
- Place of birth: Coronel Bogado, Paraguay
- Date of death: 25 August 2012 (aged 77)
- Place of death: Vélez-Rubio, Spain
- Position: Left winger

Senior career*
Years	Team	Apps	(Gls)
1953–1958	Nacional		
1958–1961	Real Oviedo	33	(4)
1961–1962	Elche	2	(1)
1962–1964	Constància	50	(8)
1964–1965	L'Hospitalet	12	(3)
1965–1966	Abarán		
1966–1967	Manchego		
1967–1969	CD Almería		
1969–1971	Adra CF		
1971–1972	AD Almería		

International career
1956–1958	Paraguay	13	(6)
- * Club domestic league appearances and goals

Florencio Amarilla Lacasa (3 January 1935 – 25 August 2012) was a Paraguayan footballer, coach and later actor.

Amarilla was born in Coronel Bogado, Paraguay. He started his career in with Club Nacional in Paraguay before being transferred to Europe to play for teams like Elche CF and Real Oviedo of Spain. After leaving Elche, he wandered through a number of teams in the Spanish second and third levels before retiring at AD Almería in 1972. He played as a striker.

Amarilla was also part of the Paraguay national team that qualified to the 1958 FIFA World Cup. In the qualifiers, Amarilla was Paraguay's top scorer with three goals and he was also one of the top scorers for Paraguay in the World Cup with two goals.

== Later career ==
Amarilla stayed in the Province of Almería in Spain after his career and began appearing in films shot in the region, most often as an unlisted extra but sometimes credited with a minor role. His on-screen appearances include 100 Rifles, Patton, El Condor, Catlow and Conan the Barbarian.

== Death ==
Amarilla died in Vélez-Rubio, Spain on 25 August 2012, at the age of 77.

== Partial filmography ==
- 100 Rifles (1969) - (uncredited)
- Patton (1970) - Soldier (uncredited)
- El Condor (1970) - Aguila
- The Horsemen (1971) - Arabian Man (uncredited)
- Doc (1971) - Man (uncredited)
- Red Sun (1971) - Man (uncredited)
- Catlow (1971) - Tarahumara
- Rum Runners (1971) - Man (uncredited)
- Duck, You Sucker! (1971) - Revolutionary (uncredited)
- Hannie Caulder (1971) - American Indian (uncredited)
- Chato's Land (1972)
- Chino (1973) - Little Bear (uncredited)
- Conan the Barbarian (1982) - Man (uncredited)
- Yellow Hair and the Fortress of Gold (1984) - Stagecoach Apache
