= József Bencsics =

Hungarian footballer

Personal information
- Date of birth: 6 August 1933
- Place of birth: Szombathely, Hungary
- Date of death: 13 July 1995 (aged 61)
- Place of death: Budapest, Hungary
- Position: Forward

Senior career*
Years	Team	Apps	(Gls)
1954–1956	Szombathelyi Haladás	42	(14)
1956–1961	Újpest FC	75	(17)
1961–1962	Pécsi Mecsek FC	7	(1)
Total		124	(32)

International career
1957–1958	Hungary	8	(1)
- * Club domestic league appearances and goals

József Bencsics (6 August 1933 – 13 July 1995) was a Hungarian footballer who played for Haladás, Újpest FC and Pécsi Dózsa as well as on the Hungary national football team at the 1958 FIFA World Cup. He played 8 games and scored 1 goal for the Hungary national team. Bencsics died in Budapest on 13 July 1995, at the age of 61.
