= Aurelio González (footballer) =

Paraguayan footballer and coach (1905-1997)

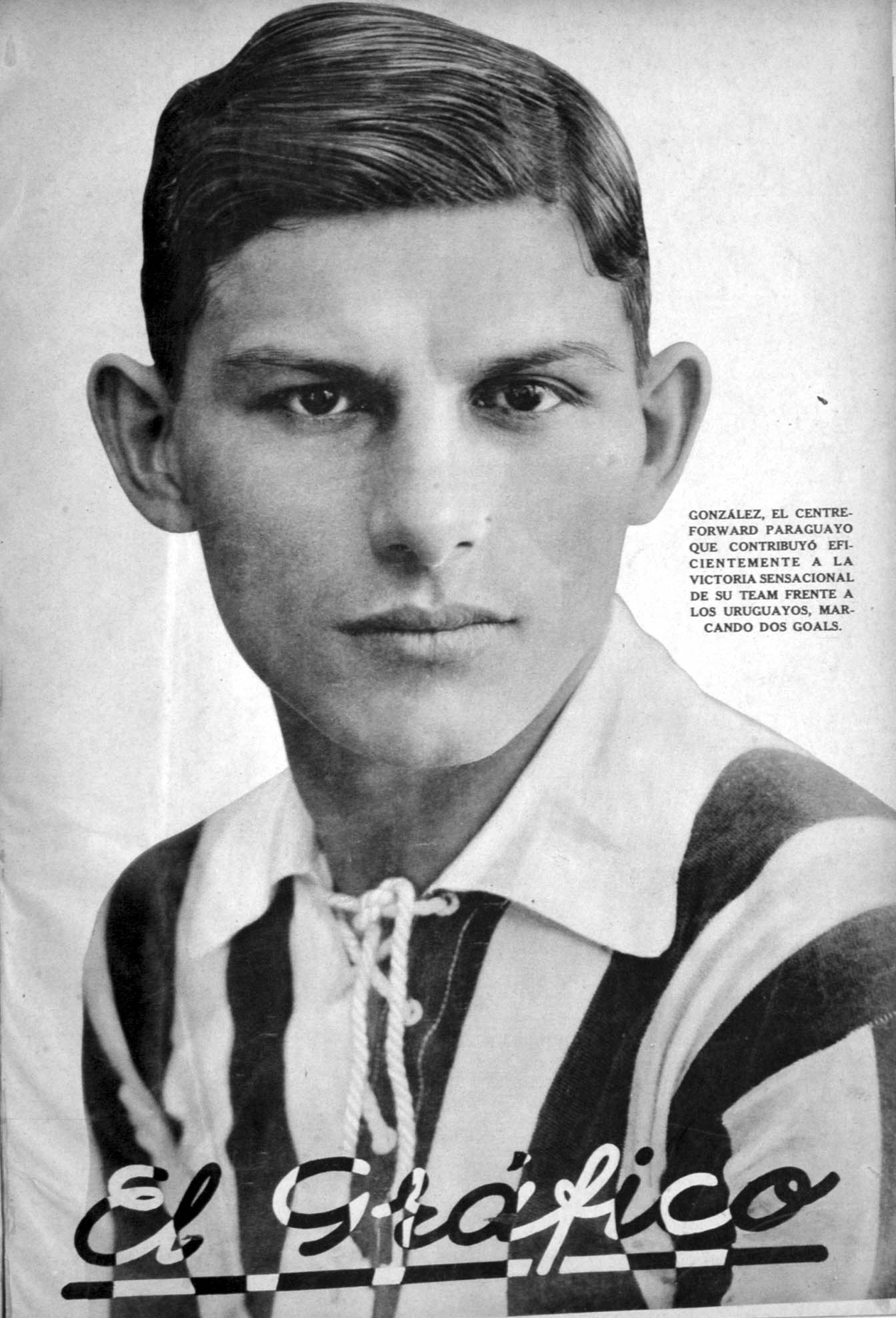
- González, covered on El Gráfico in 1929

Personal information
- Full name: Aurelio Ramón González Benítez
- Date of birth: 25 September 1905
- Place of birth: Luque, Paraguay
- Date of death: 9 July 1997 (aged 91)
- Height: 1.70 m (5 ft 7 in)
- Position: Forward

International career
| Years | Team | Apps | (Gls) |
- Paraguay

Aurelio Ramón González Benítez (25 September 1905 – 9 July 1997) was a Paraguayan football player and coach.

González is one of the greatest football players of Paraguay, considered by many as the second best player behind Arsenio Erico. He started his career in Sportivo Luqueño and then moved to Olimpia of Asunción where he spent the rest of his career winning several championships, most notably the three consecutive national championships obtained by Olimpia in 1927, 1928 and 1929.

In the early 1930s he rejected an offer worth millions from San Lorenzo de Almagro of Argentina in order to fight for his country, Paraguay, in the Chaco War. He also was a vital player of the Paraguay national team scoring several goals in the 1920s and 1930s, and participated at the 1930 World Cup.

As a coach, he led Olimpia of Asunción to numerous championships and to the first Copa Libertadores final in 1960. He also coached Sportivo Luqueño on a pro bono basis, and the Paraguay national team in the 1958 World Cup.
