= 1958 FIFA World Cup =

Association football tournament in Sweden

Världsmästerskapet i Fotboll Sverige 1958 (Swedish)

Tournament details
- Host country: Sweden
- Dates: 8–29 June
- Teams: 16 (from 3 confederations)
- Venues: 12 (in 12 host cities)

Final positions
- Champions: Brazil (1st title)
- Runners-up: Sweden
- Third place: France
- Fourth place: West Germany

Tournament statistics
- Matches played: 35
- Goals scored: 126 (3.6 per match)
- Attendance: 819,810 (23,423 per match)
- Top scorer: (France) Just Fontaine (13 goals)
- Best player: (Brazil) Didi
- Best young player: (Brazil) Pelé
- Best goalkeeper: (Northern Ireland) Harry Gregg

The 1958 FIFA World Cup was the sixth FIFA World Cup, the quadrennial football tournament for senior national teams. It was played in Sweden from 8 to 29 June 1958. It remains the only Nordic country to have hosted a FIFA World Cup.

Brazil beat Sweden 5–2 in the final in Solna, Stockholm, to claim their first title, having beaten France in the semi-final and Wales in the quarter-final. The tournament also marked the arrival of a 17 year old Pelé on the world stage. He scored in all three of Brazil's knockout games. French striker Just Fontaine scored 13 goals, the record for the most goals ever scored in a single tournament.

This was the first appearance of Wales at the FIFA World Cup. They did not qualify for another until 2022. This tournament also marked the debuts of Northern Ireland, as well as the Soviet Union. Defending champions West Germany were eliminated by runners-up and host Sweden in the semi-final.

== Host selection ==
Argentina, Chile, Mexico, and Sweden expressed interest in hosting the tournament. Swedish delegates lobbied other countries at the FIFA Congress held in Rio de Janeiro around the opening of the 1950 World Cup finals. Sweden was awarded the 1958 tournament unopposed on 23 June 1950.

== Qualification ==
The hosts (Sweden) and the defending champions (West Germany) qualified automatically. Of the remaining 14 places, nine were allocated to Europe, three to South America, one to North/Central America, and one to Asia/Africa.

Aside from the main European zone matches, Wales, which finished second in its group behind Czechoslovakia, was drawn into a play-off with Israel after Israel won its group by default because its three opponents, Turkey, Indonesia and Sudan, refused to play. FIFA had imposed a rule that no team would qualify without playing at least one match, something that had happened in several previous World Cups. Wales won the play-off and qualified for the first time (something they did not do again until 2022). With Northern Ireland making its debut, and England and Scotland also qualifying, this World Cup was the only one to date to feature all four of the United Kingdom’s Home Nations.

This World Cup also featured the entry and qualification of the Soviet Union for the first time, while Argentina appeared for the first time since 1934. It was also the first one for which Italy failed to qualify (Italy did not take part in the 1930 tournament but there was no qualification for that competition). Other teams that failed to qualify included two-time champions and 1954 semi-finalists Uruguay, as well as Spain and Belgium.

On 8 February 1958, in Solna, Lennart Hyland and Sven Jerring presented the results of the draw in which the qualified teams were divided into four groups. Seeding was geographical rather than by team strength, with each group containing one western European team, one eastern European team, one of the four British teams that had qualified, and one from the Americas.

=== List of qualified teams ===
The following 16 teams qualified for the final tournament.

AFC (0)

- None qualified

CAF (0)

- None qualified

NAFC (1)

- Mexico

CCCF (0)

- None qualified

CONMEBOL (3)

- Argentina
- Brazil
- Paraguay

UEFA (12)

- Austria
- Czechoslovakia
- England
- France
- Hungary
- Northern Ireland (debut)
- Scotland
- Soviet Union (debut)
- Sweden (hosts)
- Wales (debut)
- West Germany (holders)
- Yugoslavia

== Format ==
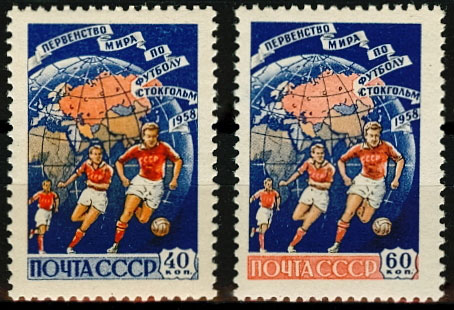
USSR stamps marking the tournament; the Soviet Union qualified for the first time

The format of the competition changed from 1954: 16 teams still competed in four groups of four, but this time each team played each of the other teams in its group at least once, without extra time in the event of a draw. Two points were awarded for a win and one point for a draw. If the first two teams finished on equal points, then goal average (or goal ratio) decided their placements with the top two teams from each group going through to the quarter finals. As in 1954, if the second- and third-placed teams finished on the same points, then there would be a play-off with the winner going through. If a play-off resulted in a draw, goal average from the group games would be used to determine who went through to the next round. If the goal averages were equal, then lots would have been drawn. By the time the competition began, these arrangements were still in discussion. Some teams complained that a play-off match, meaning three games in five days, was too much, and before the second round of group matches, FIFA informed the teams that goal average would be used before resorting to a play-off. This was overturned when the Swedish Football Association complained, stating that it was wrong to change the rules mid-tournament, but also because it wanted the extra revenue from playoff matches.

This was the first time that goal average was available to separate teams in a World Cup. It was used to separate the teams finishing first and second in one of the groups. However, all three playoffs finished with decisive results and so it was not needed to separate the teams involved in a tied playoff.

Almost all the matches kicked off simultaneously in each of the three rounds of the group phase, as did the quarter-finals and semi-finals. The exceptions were Sweden's three group matches, all of which were televised by Sveriges Radio; these started at other times so Swedes could attend other matches without missing their own team's. Apart from these, one match per round was televised, and relayed across Europe by the European Broadcasting Union (EBU). Many Swedes bought their first television for the World Cup.

The official ball was the "Top-Star VM-bollen 1958" model made by Sydsvenska Läder & Remfabriks AB (aka "Remmen" or "Sydläder") in Ängelholm. Four FIFA officials conducted a blind test to choose it from 102 candidates.

== Seeding ==
There was no seeding by strength for this World Cup; the teams were instead allocated geographically into four pots chosen by the FIFA World Cup Organisers. Teams were drawn from each pot into Groups 1–4 in numerical order.

Preventing the defending champions from meeting the hosts in the group stage, either by seeding or predetermined group positions, was a practiced tradition throughout the history of the FIFA World Cup, with 1934 and 1954 being the only two exceptions. This tradition continued in 1958, with West Germany as defending champion and host nation Sweden both being allocated into the same Western European Pot, which kept them from meeting in the group stage.

Western European Pot	Eastern European Pot	British Pot	Americas Pot
Sweden (hosts); West Germany (holders); Austria; France	Czechoslovakia; Hungary; Soviet Union; Yugoslavia	England; Northern Ireland; Scotland; Wales	Argentina; Brazil; Mexico; Paraguay

The geographical basis of the seeding attracted criticism, especially from Austria, who were drawn against the teams considered strongest in each of the other three pots.

== Summary ==
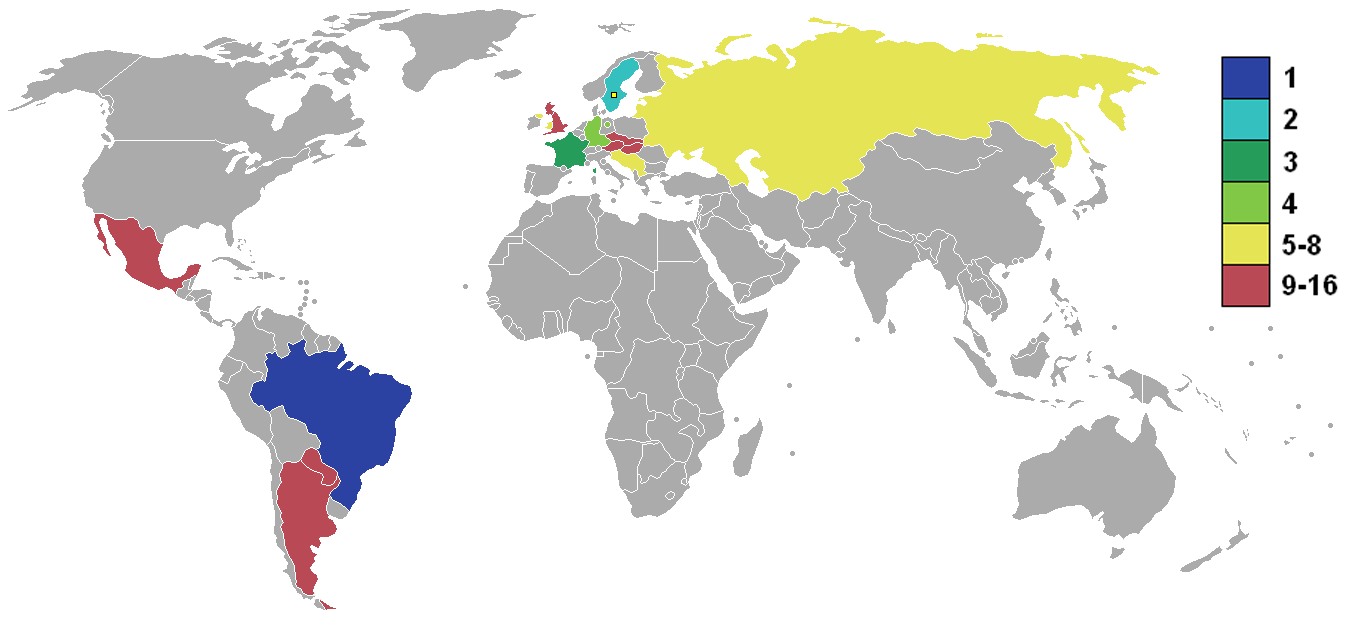
Qualifying countries and their results

In Group 4, Pelé and Garrincha did not play until the last of Brazil's group games, against the Soviet Union. Pelé failed to score, but provided the assist to Vavá's second goal. Brazil won the game 2–0 (also thanks to an impressive exhibition of dribbling prowess by Garrincha) and the group by two points. Previously, they had drawn 0–0 with England in what was the first ever goalless game in World Cup history. Eventually, the Soviet Union and England went to a playoff game, in which Anatoli Ilyin scored in the 67th minute to knock England out, while Austria had already been eliminated. The English side had been weakened by the Munich air disaster earlier in the year, which killed three internationals on the books of Manchester United, including England's young star Duncan Edwards.

Playoffs were also needed in Group 1 (Northern Ireland beat Czechoslovakia to join the defending champions West Germany in the quarter-finals) and Group 3 (Wales topped Hungary to advance with hosts Sweden). Hungary had become a spent force after their appearance in the final of the previous tournament. They had lost their best players two years before, when they fled in the wake of the failed uprising against the communist regime. From the 1954 team, only goalkeeper Gyula Grosics, defender Jozsef Bozsik and forward Nándor Hidegkuti remained.

In Group 2, Scotland faced Yugoslavia, Paraguay, and France. France topped the group, with Just Fontaine netting six goals. Yugoslavia finished second, while Scotland came in last.

In the quarter-finals, France's Just Fontaine continued his group stage form, managing another two goals as France triumphed over Northern Ireland. West Germany's Helmut Rahn put them into the semi-finals with a single goal against Yugoslavia, while Sweden went through at the expense of the Soviet Union. In the other quarter-final, Pelé scored the only goal for Brazil against Wales.

In the semi-finals, Sweden continued their strong run as they defeated West Germany 3–1 in a vicious game in which the German player Erich Juskowiak was sent off (the first ever German player to be sent off in an international game) and German veteran forward Fritz Walter was injured, further weakening the German team (substitutes were first allowed in the 1970 FIFA World Cup).

In the other semi-final, Brazil and France were tied 1–1 for much of the first half. However, 36 minutes into the game, French captain and most experienced defender Robert Jonquet suffered a broken leg in a clash with Vavá, and France was down to ten men for the rest of the game. Brazil dominated the rest of the match, as a Pelé hat-trick gave them a 5–2 victory. Fontaine of France added one goal to his impressive tally.

In the match for third place, Fontaine scored four more goals as France defeated West Germany 6–3. This brought his total to 13 goals in one competition, a record that still stands.

=== Final ===
Official 1958 FIFA World Cup poster.

The final was played in Solna, in the Råsunda Stadium; 50,000 people watched as the Brazilians went a goal down after four minutes. However, Vavá equalised shortly afterwards and then put them a goal ahead before half time. In the second half, Pelé outshone everyone, notching two goals. For the first one, he lobbed the ball over Bengt Gustavsson then followed it with a precise volley shot. Zagallo added a goal in between, and Sweden managed a consolation goal.

In the final, many World Cup records were set that still stand as of 2018. At age 17, Pelé simultaneously became the youngest player to participate in, score, and win a World Cup final. Conversely, Nils Liedholm became the oldest player to score in a World Cup Final at 35 years 263 days. This final had the highest number of goals scored by a winning team (5), the highest number of total goals scored (7), and together with the 1970 and 1998 finals shares the highest goal margin of difference (3); Brazil played in all those three finals.

The game is also notable for many firsts in FIFA World Cup. With the exception of the 1950 FIFA World Cup final group stage, this marked the first time that a World Cup host reached the final without winning it. Additionally, the match marked the first time two nations from different continents (Europe and South America) met in a World Cup final. It also marks the first and only World Cup hosted in Europe not won by a European team, a feat mirrored in 2014, when a World Cup hosted in the Americas was not won by a team from the Americas for the first time, when Germany beat Argentina 1–0 in the final. It is also presently the only FIFA World Cup when all teams earned at least one point in the group stage.

== Venues ==
A total of twelve cities throughout the central and southern parts of Sweden hosted the tournament. FIFA regulations required at least six stadiums to have a capacity of at least 20,000. If Denmark had qualified, the organisers had planned to use the Idrætsparken in Copenhagen for Denmark's group matches. The Idrætsparken was renovated in 1956 with this in mind, but Denmark lost out to England in qualification. When doubts arose about whether funding would be forthcoming for rebuilding the Ullevi and Malmö Stadion, the organisers considered stadiums in Copenhagen and Oslo as contingency measures.

The Råsunda Stadium was expanded from 38,000 for the World Cup by building end stands. Organising committee chairman Holger Bergérus mortgaged his house to pay for this. The new Malmö Stadion was built for the World Cup, replacing the 1896 Malmö Stadion at a new site. The Idrottsparken had 4,709 seats added for the World Cup. The Social Democratic municipal government refused to pay for this until the organisers threatened to select Folkungavallen in Linköping instead. At the Rimnersvallen, a stand from the smaller Oddevallen stadium was moved to Rimnersvallen for the World Cup. The crowd at Brazil v. Austria was estimated at 21,000, with more looking in from the adjoining hillside. The most used stadium was the Råsunda Stadium in Stockholm, which hosted 8 matches, including the final, followed by the Ullevi Stadium in Gothenburg (the biggest stadium used during the tournament), which hosted 7 matches. The Malmö Stadium hosted 4 matches, Norrköping hosted 3 matches; Borås, Halmstad, Helsingborg, Västerås, and Sandviken hosted 2 matches each, and Örebro, Eskilstuna, and Uddevalla each hosted 1 match.

Gothenburg	Solna (Stockholm area)	Malmö	Helsingborg
Ullevi Stadium	Råsunda Stadium	Malmö Stadion	Olympia
Capacity: 53,500	Capacity: 52,400	Capacity: 30,000	Capacity: 27,000
Eskilstuna	1958 FIFA World Cup is located in Southern Sweden		Norrköping
Tunavallen	1958 FIFA World Cup is located in Southern Sweden		Idrottsparken
Capacity: 22,000	1958 FIFA World Cup is located in Southern Sweden		Capacity: 20,000
Sandviken	1958 FIFA World Cup is located in Southern Sweden		Uddevalla
Jernvallen	1958 FIFA World Cup is located in Southern Sweden		Rimnersvallen
Capacity: 20,000	1958 FIFA World Cup is located in Southern Sweden		Capacity: 17,778
Borås	Halmstad	Örebro	Västerås
Ryavallen	Örjans Vall	Eyravallen	Arosvallen
Capacity: 15,000	Capacity: 15,000	Capacity: 13,000	Capacity: 10,000

== Match officials ==
22 match officials were assigned to the tournament to serve as referees and assistant referees.

Europe

- (Austria) Fritz Seipelt
- (Belgium) Lucien van Nuffel
- (Czechoslovakia) Martin Macko
- (Denmark) Carl Jørgensen
- (England) Arthur Ellis
- (England) Reginald Leafe
- (Finland) Arne Eriksson
- (France) Maurice Guigue
- (Hungary) István Zsolt
- (Italy) Vincenzo Orlandini
- (Netherlands) Jan Bronkhorst
- (Portugal) Joaquim Campos
- (Scotland) Jack Mowat
- (Spain) Juan Gardeazábal Garay
- (Sweden) Sten Ahlner
- (Switzerland) Raymond Wyssling
- (Soviet Union) Nikolai Latyshev
- (Wales) Mervyn Griffiths
- (West Germany) Albert Dusch
- (Socialist Federal Republic of Yugoslavia) Leo Lemešić

South America

- (Argentina) Juan Brozzi
- (Uruguay) José María Codesal

== Squads ==
For a list of all squads that appeared in the final tournament, see 1958 FIFA World Cup squads.

== Group stage ==
=== Group 1 ===
Pos	Team	Pld	W	D	L	GF	GA	GR	Pts	Qualification
1	West Germany	3	1	2	0	7	5	1.400	4	Advance to knockout stage
2	Northern Ireland	3	1	1	1	4	5	0.800	3 (Note: Northern Ireland finished ahead of Czechoslovakia by winning a play-off.)	Advance to knockout stage
3	Czechoslovakia	3	1	1	1	8	4	2.000	3	
4	Argentina	3	1	0	2	5	10	0.500	2	

Source: FIFA
Notes:

The West Germans, surprise world champions four years before, were still very strong, and fielded a young forward with lots of potential in Uwe Seeler. The Germans had to contend with a tournament favorites in Argentina's team, competing for the first time since 1934. Argentina had been given a chance of reaching the semi-finals or even winning the World Cup this time. Czechoslovakia was a fairly strong team with a rich football tradition, and was considered to be no walkover for the West Germans or the Argentinians.

Northern Ireland had qualified for the tournament after defeating two-time world champions Italy during World Cup qualifying despite being considered underdogs. They ultimately advanced to the quarter-finals of the World Cup Finals by defeating Czechoslovakia in a play-off match, cited as one of the major upsets in early World Cup history.

Argentina experienced a horrible blow finishing last in the group with a −5 goal differential. Arriving home, the Argentinian team met the wrath of several thousand angry football fans at Ezeiza Airport in Buenos Aires.

8 June 1958
19:00 (CET)

Argentina	1–3	West Germany
Corbatta 3'		Rahn 32', 79'; Seeler 42'

Malmö Stadion, Malmö
Attendance: 31,156
Referee: Reginald Leafe (England)
8 June 1958
19:00 (CET)

Northern Ireland	1–0	Czechoslovakia
Cush 21'

Örjans Vall, Halmstad
Attendance: 10,647
Referee: Fritz Seipelt (Austria)

11 June 1958
19:00 (CET)

West Germany	2–2	Czechoslovakia
Schäfer 60'; Rahn 71'		Dvořák 24' (pen.); Zikán 42'

Olympiastadion, Helsingborg
Attendance: 25,000
Referee: Arthur Edward Ellis (England)
11 June 1958
19:00 (CET)

Argentina	3–1	Northern Ireland
Corbatta 37' (pen.); Menéndez 56'; Avio 60'		McParland 4'

Örjans Vall, Halmstad
Attendance: 14,174
Referee: Sten Ahlner (Sweden)

15 June 1958
19:00 (CET)

West Germany	2–2	Northern Ireland
Rahn 20'; Seeler 78'		McParland 18', 60'

Malmö Stadion, Malmö
Attendance: 21,990
Referee: Joaquim Campos (Portugal)
15 June 1958
19:00 (CET)

Czechoslovakia	6–1	Argentina
Dvořák 8'; Zikán 17', 40'; Feureisl 69'; Hovorka 82', 89'		Corbatta 65' (pen.)

Olympiastadion, Helsingborg
Attendance: 16,418
Referee: Arthur Edward Ellis (England)

==== Play-off ====
17 June 1958
19:00 (CET)

Northern Ireland	2–1 (a.e.t.)	Czechoslovakia
McParland 44', 99'		Zikán 19'

Malmö Stadion, Malmö
Attendance: 6,196
Referee: Maurice Guigue (France)

=== Group 2 ===
Pos	Team	Pld	W	D	L	GF	GA	GR	Pts	Qualification
1	France	3	2	0	1	11	7	1.571	4 (Note: France finished ahead of Yugoslavia on goal average.)	Advance to knockout stage
2	Yugoslavia	3	1	2	0	7	6	1.167	4	Advance to knockout stage
3	Paraguay	3	1	1	1	9	12	0.750	3	
4	Scotland	3	0	1	2	4	6	0.667	1	

Source: FIFA
Notes:

The second group had the largest number of goals scored in a single group in the 1958 World Cup, with 31 goals in total (~5.16 goals per game). Just Fontaine of France scored 6 of his 13 goals in the tournament, making him the tournament's top scorer going into the quarter-finals.

The teams in this group had not achieved significant success in past World Cups. France, even as hosts in 1938, did not secure notable achievements; Yugoslavia failed to match their 1930 semi-final run; and both Paraguay and Scotland entered the tournament as underdogs.

France won the group ahead of Yugoslavia and went on to finish third.

8 June 1958
19:00 (CET)

France	7–3	Paraguay
Fontaine 24', 30', 67'; Piantoni 52'; Wisnieski 61'; Kopa 70'; Vincent 83'		Amarilla 20', 44' (pen.); Romero 50'

Idrottsparken, Norrköping
Attendance: 16,518
Referee: Juan Gardeazábal Garay (Spain)
8 June 1958
19:00 (CET)

Yugoslavia	1–1	Scotland
Petaković 6'		Murray 49'

Arosvallen, Västerås
Attendance: 9,591
Referee: Raymond Wyssling (Switzerland)

11 June 1958
19:00 (CET)

Yugoslavia	3–2	France
Petaković 16'; Veselinović 63', 88'		Fontaine 4', 85'

Arosvallen, Västerås
Attendance: 12,217
Referee: Benjamin Griffiths (Wales)
11 June 1958
19:00 (CET)

Paraguay	3–2	Scotland
Agüero 4'; Ré 45'; Parodi 73'		Mudie 24'; Collins 74'

Idrottsparken, Norrköping
Attendance: 11,665
Referee: Vincenzo Orlandini (Italy)

15 June 1958
19:00 (CET)

France	2–1	Scotland
Kopa 22'; Fontaine 44'		Baird 66'

Eyravallen, Örebro
Attendance: 13,554
Referee: Juan Regis Brozzi (Argentina)
15 June 1958
19:00 (CET)

Paraguay	3–3	Yugoslavia
Parodi 20'; Agüero 52'; Romero 80'		Ognjanović 18'; Veselinović 21'; Rajkov 73'

Tunavallen, Eskilstuna
Attendance: 13,103
Referee: Martin Macko (Czechoslovakia)

=== Group 3 ===
Pos	Team	Pld	W	D	L	GF	GA	GR	Pts	Qualification
1	Sweden	3	2	1	0	5	1	5.000	5	Advance to knockout stage
2	Wales	3	0	3	0	2	2	1.000	3 (Note: Wales finished ahead of Hungary by winning a play-off.)	Advance to knockout stage
3	Hungary	3	1	1	1	6	3	2.000	3	
4	Mexico	3	0	1	2	1	8	0.125	1	

Source: FIFA
Notes:

The Swedish hosts could count themselves lucky in ending up in a rather weak group, which they proceeded to win fairly easily with their powerful, workmanlike football. The group included Hungary which had been considered by far the best team in the world some years ago, although the Hungarians could not beat West Germany in the final of the World Cup in 1954. But the Hungarian team had been dealt a blow by the Hungarian Revolution of 1956 after which star players like Sándor Kocsis and Ferenc Puskás left their homeland. Striker Nándor Hidegkuti was still playing, but he was 36 years old and nowhere near his peak form.

In spite of Hungary's recent travails, they were still considered a strong side and were expected to advance from their group. The success of Wales was a surprise but they drew all their group games and beat the Hungarians in a play-off match to follow Sweden into the knockout stage. Wales played Brazil in the quarter-finals and became the recipient of young Pelé's first World Cup goal.

The 1–1 draw between Wales and Mexico was the first point scored by Mexico in a World Cup, having lost all eight matches in their previous three appearances in the World Cup, as well as their first match in this group against Sweden. To date, no other team has ever lost nine consecutive games in the World Cup.

The match between Hungary and Wales in Sandviken became the northernmost World Cup match in history.

8 June 1958
14:00 (CET)

Sweden	3–0	Mexico
Simonsson 17', 64'; Liedholm 57' (pen.)

Råsunda Stadium, Solna
Attendance: 34,107
Referee: Nikolay Latyshev (Soviet Union)
8 June 1958
19:00 (CET)

Hungary	1–1	Wales
Bozsik 5'		J. Charles 27'

Jernvallen, Sandviken
Attendance: 15,343
Referee: José María Codesal (Uruguay)

11 June 1958
19:00 (CET)

Mexico	1–1	Wales
Belmonte 89'		I. Allchurch 32'

Råsunda Stadium, Solna
Attendance: 15,150
Referee: Leo Lemesic (Yugoslavia)
12 June 1958
19:00 (CET)

Sweden	2–1	Hungary
Hamrin 34', 55'		Tichy 77'

Råsunda Stadium, Solna
Attendance: 38,850
Referee: Jack Mowat (Scotland)

15 June 1958
14:00 (CET)

Sweden	0–0	Wales

Råsunda Stadium, Solna
Attendance: 30,287
Referee: Lucien van Nuffel (Belgium)
15 June 1958
19:00 (CET)

Hungary	4–0	Mexico
Tichy 19', 46'; Sándor 54'; Bencsics 69'

Jernvallen, Sandviken
Attendance: 13,300
Referee: Arne Eriksson (Finland)

==== Play-off ====
17 June 1958
19:00 (CET)

Wales	2–1	Hungary
I. Allchurch 55'; Medwin 76'		Tichy 33'

Råsunda Stadium, Solna
Attendance: 2,823
Referee: Nikolay Latyshev (Soviet Union)

=== Group 4 ===
Pos	Team	Pld	W	D	L	GF	GA	GR	Pts	Qualification
1	Brazil	3	2	1	0	5	0	—	5	Advance to knockout stage
2	Soviet Union	3	1	1	1	4	4	1.000	3 (Note: The Soviet Union finished ahead of England by winning a play-off.)	Advance to knockout stage
3	England	3	0	3	0	4	4	1.000	3	
4	Austria	3	0	1	2	2	7	0.286	1	

Source: FIFA
Notes:

Despite setbacks in earlier tournaments, Brazil was still regarded as a formidable force, a reputation that they justified. The Soviet Union, having clinched the Olympic gold in 1956, and Austria, securing the bronze medal at the 1954 World Cup in Switzerland, were also strong contenders. England, despite being weakened by the tragic Munich air disaster that claimed several players, remained a team of considerable strength.

In the end, this group had the highest average attendance (31,320 per game), even higher than Group 3 with the host nation, Sweden.

The quality of the football in this group did not quite live up to expectations, however. Only 15 goals were scored in the whole group, only one more than Group 3. And when England and Brazil drew 0–0, it was the first time in World Cup history that a game ended goalless. It was also the first time Brazil had failed to score in a World Cup finals match.

Brazil won the group without conceding a single goal. The teenage Pelé played Brazil's last game against the Soviet Union. He did not score but drew wild reviews for his play. The Soviet Union, in their first World Cup, took second place.

8 June 1958
19:00 (CET)

Brazil	3–0	Austria
Altafini 37', 85'; Nílton Santos 50'

Rimnersvallen, Uddevalla
Attendance: 17,788
Referee: Maurice Guigue (France)
8 June 1958
19:00 (CET)

Soviet Union	2–2	England
Simonyan 13'; A. Ivanov 56'		Kevan 66'; Finney 85' (pen.)

Ullevi, Gothenburg
Attendance: 49,348
Referee: István Zsolt (Hungary)

11 June 1958
19:00 (CET)

Brazil	0–0	England

Ullevi, Gothenburg
Attendance: 40,895
Referee: Albert Dusch (West Germany)
11 June 1958
19:00 (CET)

Soviet Union	2–0	Austria
Ilyin 15'; V. Ivanov 62'

Ryavallen, Borås
Attendance: 21,239
Referee: Carl Jørgensen (Denmark)

15 June 1958
19:00 (CET)

England	2–2	Austria
Haynes 56'; Kevan 74'		Koller 15'; Körner 71'

Ryavallen, Borås
Attendance: 15,872
Referee: Jan Bronkhorst (Netherlands)
15 June 1958
19:00 (CET)

Brazil	2–0	Soviet Union
Vavá 3', 77'

Ullevi, Gothenburg
Attendance: 50,928
Referee: Maurice Guigue (France)

==== Play-off ====
17 June 1958
19:00 (CET)

Soviet Union	1–0	England
Ilyin 69'

Ullevi, Gothenburg
Attendance: 23,182
Referee: Albert Dusch (West Germany)

== Knockout stage ==
=== Bracket ===
Quarter-finals
19 June – Gothenburg
Brazil	1
Wales	0
19 June – Norrköping
France	4
Northern Ireland	0
19 June – Solna
Sweden	2
Soviet Union	0
19 June – Malmö
West Germany	1
Yugoslavia	0

Semi-finals
24 June – Solna
Brazil	5
France	2
24 June – Gothenburg
Sweden	3
West Germany	1

Final
29 June – Solna
Brazil	5
Sweden	2
Match for third place
28 June – Gothenburg
France	6
West Germany	3

=== Quarter-finals ===
19 June 1958
19:00 (CET)

Brazil	1–0	Wales
Pelé 66'

Ullevi, Gothenburg
Attendance: 25,923
Referee: Fritz Seipelt (Austria)

19 June 1958
19:00 (CET)

France	4–0	Northern Ireland
Wisnieski 44'; Fontaine 55', 63'; Piantoni 68'

Idrottsparken, Norrköping
Attendance: 11,800
Referee: Juan Gardeazábal Garay (Spain)

19 June 1958
19:00 (CET)

Sweden	2–0	Soviet Union
Hamrin 49'; Simonsson 88'

Råsunda Stadium, Solna
Attendance: 31,900
Referee: Reginald Leafe (England)

19 June 1958
19:00 (CET)

West Germany	1–0	Yugoslavia
Rahn 12'

Malmö Stadion, Malmö
Attendance: 20,055
Referee: Raymond Wyssling (Switzerland)

=== Semi-finals ===
24 June 1958
19:00 (CET)

Brazil	5–2	France
Vavá 2'; Didi 39'; Pelé 52', 64', 75'		Fontaine 9'; Piantoni 83'

Råsunda Stadium, Solna
Attendance: 27,100
Referee: Benjamin Griffiths (Wales)

24 June 1958
19:00 (CET)

Sweden	3–1	West Germany
Skoglund 32'; Gren 81'; Hamrin 88'		Schäfer 24'

Ullevi, Gothenburg
Attendance: 49,471
Referee: István Zsolt (Hungary)

=== Match for third place ===
28 June 1958
17:00 (CET)

France	6–3	West Germany
Fontaine 16', 36', 78', 89'; Kopa 27' (pen.); Douis 50'		Cieslarczyk 18'; Rahn 52'; Schäfer 84'

Ullevi, Gothenburg
Attendance: 32,483
Referee: Juan Regis Brozzi (Argentina)

=== Final ===
29 June 1958
15:00 (CET)

Brazil	5–2	Sweden
Vavá 9', 32'; Pelé 55', 90'; Zagallo 68'		Liedholm 4'; Simonsson 80'

Råsunda Stadium, Solna
Attendance: 49,737
Referee: Maurice Guigue (France)

== Statistics ==
=== Goalscorers ===
With 13 goals, Just Fontaine was the top scorer in the tournament. As of 2026, no player has ever scored more goals in a single FIFA World Cup Final stage. In total, 126 goals were scored by 60 players, with none of them credited as an own goal.

13 goals

- (France) Just Fontaine

6 goals

- (Brazil) Pelé
- (West Germany) Helmut Rahn

5 goals

- (Brazil) Vavá
- (Northern Ireland) Peter McParland

4 goals

- (Czechoslovakia) Zdeněk Zikán
- (Hungary) Lajos Tichy
- (Sweden) Kurt Hamrin
- (Sweden) Agne Simonsson

3 goals

- (Argentina) Oreste Corbatta
- (France) Raymond Kopa
- (France) Roger Piantoni
- (West Germany) Hans Schäfer
- (Socialist Federal Republic of Yugoslavia) Todor Veselinović

2 goals

- (Brazil) José Altafini
- (Czechoslovakia) Milan Dvořák
- (Czechoslovakia) Václav Hovorka
- (England) Derek Kevan
- (France) Maryan Wisniewski
- (Paraguay) Juan Bautista Agüero
- (Paraguay) Florencio Amarilla
- (Paraguay) José Parodi
- (Paraguay) Jorge Lino Romero
- (Soviet Union) Anatoli Ilyin
- (Sweden) Nils Liedholm
- (Wales) Ivor Allchurch
- (West Germany) Uwe Seeler
- (Socialist Federal Republic of Yugoslavia) Aleksandar Petaković

1 goal

- (Argentina) Ludovico Avio
- (Argentina) Norberto Menéndez
- (Austria) Karl Koller
- (Austria) Alfred Körner
- (Brazil) Didi
- (Brazil) Nílton Santos
- (Brazil) Mário Zagallo
- (Czechoslovakia) Jiří Feureisl
- (England) Tom Finney
- (England) Johnny Haynes
- (France) Yvon Douis
- (France) Jean Vincent
- (Hungary) József Bencsics
- (Hungary) József Bozsik
- (Hungary) Károly Sándor
- (Mexico) Jaime Belmonte
- (Northern Ireland) Wilbur Cush
- (Paraguay) Cayetano Ré
- (Scotland) Sammy Baird
- (Scotland) Bobby Collins
- (Scotland) Jackie Mudie
- (Scotland) Jimmy Murray
- (Soviet Union) Aleksandr Ivanov
- (Soviet Union) Valentin Ivanov
- (Soviet Union) Nikita Simonyan
- (Sweden) Gunnar Gren
- (Sweden) Lennart Skoglund
- (Wales) John Charles
- (Wales) Terry Medwin
- (West Germany) Hans Cieslarczyk
- (Socialist Federal Republic of Yugoslavia) Radivoje Ognjanović
- (Socialist Federal Republic of Yugoslavia) Zdravko Rajkov

=== Team of the Tournament ===
FIFA selected the following players for the 1958 FIFA World Cup All-Star Team.

Goalkeeper	Defenders	Midfielders	Forwards
(Northern Ireland) Harry Gregg	(Brazil) Djalma Santos (Brazil) Bellini (Brazil) Nílton Santos	(Northern Ireland) Danny Blanchflower (Brazil) Didi (Sweden) Gunnar Gren (France) Raymond Kopa	(Brazil) Pelé (Brazil) Garrincha (France) Just Fontaine

=== Tournament ranking ===
In 1986, FIFA published a report that ranked all teams in each World Cup up to and including 1986, based on progress in the competition and overall results (not counting play-off results). The rankings for the 1958 tournament were as follows:

Per statistical convention in football, matches decided in extra time are counted as wins and losses. Per FIFA's ranking, the results of play-offs are not considered in the tournament ranking.

Pos	Grp	Team	Pld	W	D	L	GF	GA	GD	Pts	Final result
1	4	Brazil	6	5	1	0	16	4	+12	11	Champions
2	3	Sweden (H)	6	4	1	1	12	7	+5	9	Runners-up
3	2	France	6	4	0	2	23	15	+8	8	Third place
4	1	West Germany	6	2	2	2	12	14	−2	6	Fourth place
5	2	Yugoslavia	4	1	2	1	7	7	0	4	Eliminated in quarter-finals
6	3	Wales	4	0	3	1	2	3	−1	3 (Note: Wales's record including the play-off: 5 pld, 1 won, 3 drawn, 1 lost, 4 GF, 4 GA, 0 GD, 5 pts.)	Eliminated in quarter-finals
7	4	Soviet Union	4	1	1	2	4	6	−2	3 (Note: Soviet Union's record including the play-off: 5 pld, 2 won, 1 drawn, 2 lost, 5 GF, 6 GA, −1 GD, 5 pts.)	Eliminated in quarter-finals
8	1	Northern Ireland	4	1	1	2	4	9	−5	3 (Note: Northern Ireland's record including the play-off: 5 pld, 2 won, 1 drawn, 2 lost, 6 GF, 10 GA, −4 GD, 5 pts.)	Eliminated in quarter-finals
9	1	Czechoslovakia	3	1	1	1	8	4	+4	3 (Note: Czechoslovakia's record including the play-off: 4 pld, 1 won, 1 drawn, 2 lost, 9 GF, 6 GA, +3 GD, 3 pts.)	Eliminated in group stage
10	3	Hungary	3	1	1	1	6	3	+3	3 (Note: Hungary's record including the play-off: 4 pld, 1 won, 1 drawn, 2 lost, 7 GF, 5 GA, +2 GD, 3 pts.)	Eliminated in group stage
11	4	England	3	0	3	0	4	4	0	3 (Note: England's record including the play-off: 4 pld, 0 won, 3 drawn, 1 lost, 4 GF, 5 GA, −1 GD, 3 pts.)	Eliminated in group stage
12	2	Paraguay	3	1	1	1	9	12	−3	3	Eliminated in group stage
13	1	Argentina	3	1	0	2	5	10	−5	2	Eliminated in group stage
14	2	Scotland	3	0	1	2	4	6	−2	1	Eliminated in group stage
15	4	Austria	3	0	1	2	2	7	−5	1	Eliminated in group stage
16	3	Mexico	3	0	1	2	1	8	−7	1	Eliminated in group stage

Source: FIFA
(H) Hosts

== In popular culture ==
The 1958 FIFA World Cup is depicted in the 2016 American film Pelé: Birth of a Legend which is centered around Pelé and the Brazilian team's journey to winning the tournament.
