= Paraguay national football team results (1919–1959) =

National football team results

This page details the match results and statistics of the Paraguay national football team from 1919 to 1959.

== Key ==
Key to matches

- Att.=Match attendance
- (H)=Home ground
- (A)=Away ground
- (N)=Neutral ground

Key to record by opponent

- Pld=Games played
- W=Games won
- D=Games drawn
- L=Games lost
- GF=Goals for
- GA=Goals against

== Results ==
Paraguay's score is shown first in each case.

No.	Date	Venue	Opponents	Score	Competition	Paraguay scorers	Att.	Ref.
1	11 May 1919	Estadio de Puerto Sajonia, Asunción (H)	Argentina	1–5	Friendly	Casado	4,000	
2	20 May 1919	Estadio de Puerto Sajonia, Asunción (H)	Argentina	1–2	Friendly	Mena Porta	5,000	
3	24 May 1919	Estadio de Puerto Sajonia, Asunción (H)	Argentina	1–2	Friendly	Unknown	8,000	
4	7 April 1921	Asunción (H)	Argentina	3–1	Friendly	Uriarte, Schaerer (2)	—	
5	14 April 1921	Asunción (H)	Argentina	2–2	Friendly	Uriarte (2)	—	
6	8 October 1921	Estadio Sportivo Barracas, Buenos Aires (N)	Uruguay	2–1	1921 South American Championship	Rivas, I. López	12,000	
7	12 October 1921	Estadio Sportivo Barracas, Buenos Aires (N)	Brazil	0–3	1921 South American Championship		25,000	
8	16 October 1921	Estadio Sportivo Barracas, Buenos Aires (N)	Argentina	0–3	1921 South American Championship		25,000	
9	2 November 1921	Parque Central, Montevideo (A)	Uruguay	2–4	Friendly	I. López, Zelada	8,000	
10	24 September 1922	Estádio das Laranjeiras, Rio de Janeiro (N)	Brazil	1–1	1922 South American Championship	Rivas	25,000	
11	5 October 1922	Estádio das Laranjeiras, Rio de Janeiro (N)	Chile	3–0	1922 South American Championship	J. Ramírez, I. López, Fretes	1,000	
12	12 October 1922	Estádio das Laranjeiras, Rio de Janeiro (N)	Uruguay	1–0	1922 South American Championship	Elizeche	3,000	
13	18 October 1922	Estádio das Laranjeiras, Rio de Janeiro (N)	Argentina	0–2	1922 South American Championship		8,000	
14	22 October 1922	Estádio das Laranjeiras, Rio de Janeiro (N)	Brazil	0–3	1922 South American Championship		20,000	
15	29 October 1922	Campo da Floresta, São Paulo (A)	Brazil	1–3	Taça Rodrigues Alves	Fretes	—	
16	20 May 1923	Estadio Sportivo Barracas, Buenos Aires (A)	Argentina	2–0	Copa Rosa Chevallier Boutell	I. López, Vigliola	25,000	
17	25 May 1923	Estadio Sportivo Barracas, Buenos Aires (A)	Argentina	0–1	Copa Rosa Chevallier Boutell		25,000	
18	29 October 1923	Parque Central, Montevideo (N)	Argentina	3–4	1923 South American Championship	Rivas, Zelada, Fretes	20,000	
19	4 November 1923	Parque Central, Montevideo (N)	Uruguay	0–2	1923 South American Championship		20,000	
20	11 November 1923	Parque Central, Montevideo (N)	Brazil	1–0	1923 South American Championship	I. López	15,000	
21	22 November 1923	Parque Central, Montevideo (N)	Brazil	0–2	Taça Rodrigues Alves		—	
22	15 May 1924	Asunción (H)	Argentina	1–3	Copa Rosa Chevallier Boutell	Fleitas Solich	—	
23	18 May 1924	Asunción (H)	Argentina	2–1	Copa Rosa Chevallier Boutell	Rivas, Fleitas Solich	—	
24	12 October 1924	Parque Central, Montevideo (N)	Argentina	0–0	1924 South American Championship		12,000	
25	26 October 1924	Parque Central, Montevideo (N)	Uruguay	1–3	1924 South American Championship	Urbita Sosa	13,000	
26	1 November 1924	Parque Central, Montevideo (N)	Chile	3–1	1924 South American Championship	Rivas (2), I. López	1,000	
27	9 July 1925	Estadio Ministro Brin y Senguel, Buenos Aires (A)	Argentina	1–1	Copa Rosa Chevallier Boutell	Fretes	20,000	
28	12 July 1925	Estadio Sportivo Barracas, Buenos Aires (A)	Argentina	1–1	Copa Rosa Chevallier Boutell	Fretes	15,000	
29	14 July 1925	Parque Central, Montevideo (A)	Uruguay	1–0	Copa Bossio	Rivas	18,000	
30	18 July 1925	Parque Central, Montevideo (A)	Uruguay	1–0	Copa Bossio	I. López	15,000	
31	15 August 1925	Estadio de Puerto Sajonia, Asunción (H)	Uruguay	1–0	Copa Bossio	Rivas	20,000	
32	19 August 1925	Estadio de Puerto Sajonia, Asunción (H)	Uruguay	0–1	Copa Bossio		18,000	
33	23 August 1925	Estadio de Puerto Sajonia, Asunción (H)	Uruguay	0–0	Copa Bossio		20,000	
34	29 November 1925	Estadio Ministro Brin y Senguel, Buenos Aires (N)	Argentina	0–2	1925 South American Championship		18,000	
35	6 December 1925	Estadio Sportivo Barracas, Buenos Aires (N)	Brazil	2–5	1925 South American Championship	Rivas (2)	12,000	
36	17 December 1925	Estadio Ministro Brin y Senguel, Buenos Aires (N)	Brazil	1–3	1925 South American Championship	Fretes	14,000	
37	20 December 1925	Estadio Ministro Brin y Senguel, Buenos Aires (N)	Argentina	1–3	1925 South American Championship	Fleitas Solich	25,000	
38	29 May 1926	Estadio Ministro Brin y Senguel, Buenos Aires (A)	Argentina	1–2	Copa Rosa Chevallier Boutell	I. López	6,000	
39	3 June 1926	Estadio Sportivo Barracas, Buenos Aires (A)	Argentina	1–2	Copa Rosa Chevallier Boutell	Fretes	3,000	
40	20 October 1926	Estadio Sport de Ñuñoa, Santiago (N)	Argentina	0–8	1926 South American Championship		3,000	
41	23 October 1926	Estadio Sport de Ñuñoa, Santiago (N)	Bolivia	6–1	1926 South American Championship	I. López (2), C. Ramírez (3), P. Ramírez	2,000	
42	1 November 1926	Estadio Sport de Ñuñoa, Santiago (N)	Uruguay	1–6	1926 South American Championship	Fleitas Solich	12,000	
43	3 November 1926	Estadio Sport de Ñuñoa, Santiago (N)	Chile	1–5	1926 South American Championship	Vargas Peña	6,000	
44	15 August 1928	Estadio de Puerto Sajonia, Asunción (H)	Uruguay	3–1	Friendly	Ortega, Molinas, A. González	15,000	
45	19 August 1928	Estadio de Puerto Sajonia, Asunción (H)	Uruguay	1–1	Friendly	Ortega	12,000	
46	1 November 1929	Estadio Alvear y Tagle, Buenos Aires (N)	Uruguay	3–0	1929 South American Championship	A. González (2), Domínguez	40,000	
47	10 November 1929	Estadio Gasómetro, Buenos Aires (N)	Argentina	1–4	1929 South American Championship	Domínguez	20,000	
48	16 November 1929	Estadio Independiente, Avellaneda (N)	Peru	5–0	1929 South American Championship	Nessi, A. González (3), Domínguez	8,000	
49	17 July 1930	Parque Central, Montevideo (N)	United States	0–3	1930 FIFA World Cup		18,306	
50	20 July 1930	Estadio Centenario, Montevideo (N)	Belgium	1–0	1930 FIFA World Cup	Vargas Peña	12,000	
51	19 April 1931	Estadio de Puerto Sajonia, Asunción (H)	Argentina	0–1	Friendly		—	
52	25 April 1931	Estadio de Puerto Sajonia, Asunción (H)	Argentina	1–1	Friendly	Unknown	—	
53	4 July 1931	Estadio Sportivo Barracas, Buenos Aires (A)	Argentina	1–1	Copa Rosa Chevallier Boutell	A. González	10,000	
54	9 July 1931	Estadio Sportivo Barracas, Buenos Aires (A)	Argentina	1–3	Copa Rosa Chevallier Boutell	Benítez Cáceres	5,532	
55	2 January 1937	Estadio Gasómetro, Buenos Aires (N)	Uruguay	4–2	1937 South American Championship	Ortega (2), A. González, Erico	35,000	
56	9 January 1937	Estadio Gasómetro, Buenos Aires (N)	Argentina	1–6	1937 South American Championship	A. González	42,000	
57	13 January 1937	Estadio Gasómetro, Buenos Aires (N)	Brazil	0–5	1937 South American Championship		20,000	
58	17 January 1937	Estadio Gasómetro, Buenos Aires (N)	Chile	3–2	1937 South American Championship	Amarilla, Flor, Núñez Velloso	12,000	
59	24 January 1937	Estadio Alvear y Tagle, Buenos Aires (N)	Peru	0–1	1937 South American Championship		8,000	
60	15 January 1939	Original Estadio Nacional, Lima (N)	Chile	5–1	1939 South American Championship	Barrios, Godoy (2), Mingo, Aquino	10,000	
61	29 January 1939	Original Estadio Nacional, Lima (N)	Peru	0–3	1939 South American Championship		15,000	
62	5 February 1939	Original Estadio Nacional, Lima (N)	Uruguay	1–3	1939 South American Championship	Barrios	10,000	
63	12 February 1939	Original Estadio Nacional, Lima (N)	Ecuador	3–1	1939 South American Championship	Mingo, Godoy, Barreiro	15,000	
64	26 February 1939	Santiago (A)	Chile	1–4	Friendly	Ferreira	—	
65	14 August 1939	Estadio de Puerto Sajonia, Asunción (H)	Argentina	0–1	Copa Rosa Chevallier Boutell		20,000	
66	16 August 1939	Estadio de Puerto Sajonia, Asunción (H)	Argentina	2–2	Copa Rosa Chevallier Boutell	Diaz (o.g.), Espinola	20,000	
67	18 February 1940	Estadio de Independiente, Avellaneda (A)	Argentina	1–3	Copa Rosa Chevallier Boutell	Mingo	—	
68	25 February 1940	San Martín (A)	Argentina	0–4	Copa Rosa Chevallier Boutell		—	
69	11 January 1942	Estadio Centenario, Montevideo (N)	Argentina	3–4	1942 South American Championship	Sánchez, Aviero (2)	20,000	
70	18 January 1942	Estadio Centenario, Montevideo (N)	Peru	1–1	1942 South American Championship	Barrios	45,000	
71	22 January 1942	Estadio Centenario, Montevideo (N)	Chile	2–0	1942 South American Championship	Barrios, Baundo Franco	20,000	
72	25 January 1942	Estadio Centenario, Montevideo (N)	Ecuador	3–1	1942 South American Championship	Baundo Franco, Mingo, Ibarrola	12,000	
73	28 January 1942	Estadio Centenario, Montevideo (N)	Uruguay	1–3	1942 South American Championship	Barrios	40,000	
74	5 February 1942	Estadio Centenario, Montevideo (N)	Brazil	1–1	1942 South American Championship	Baundo Franco	15,000	
75	10 July 1943	Estadio Defensores del Chaco, Asunción (H)	Argentina	2–5	Copa Rosa Chevallier Boutell	Mellone, Ferreira	—	
76	11 July 1943	Estadio Defensores del Chaco, Asunción (H)	Argentina	2–1	Copa Rosa Chevallier Boutell	Alvarez. Marin	—	
77	6 January 1945	Estadio Gasómetro, Buenos Aires (A)	Argentina	2–5	Copa Rosa Chevallier Boutell	E. Benitez, P. Fernández	—	
78	9 January 1945	Estadio Gasómetro, Buenos Aires (A)	Argentina	3–5	Copa Rosa Chevallier Boutell	E. Benitez (2), Esquivel	—	
79	7 July 1945	Estadio Defensores del Chaco, Asunción (H)	Argentina	5–1	Copa Rosa Chevallier Boutell	J. B. Villalba, Sánchez, Sosa, Benítez Cáceres, P. Fernández	—	
80	9 July 1945	Estadio Defensores del Chaco, Asunción (H)	Argentina	1–3	Copa Rosa Chevallier Boutell	P. Fernández	—	
81	12 January 1946	Estadio Monumental, Buenos Aires (N)	Argentina	0–2	1946 South American Championship		70,000	
82	19 January 1946	Estadio Gasómetro, Buenos Aires (N)	Chile	1–2	1946 South American Championship	P. Rolón	60,000	
83	26 January 1946	Estadio Monumental, Buenos Aires (N)	Bolivia	4–2	1946 South American Championship	Genés, Benítez Cáceres, J. B. Villalba (2)	80,000	
84	29 January 1946	Estadio de Independiente, Avellaneda (N)	Brazil	1–1	1946 South American Championship	J. B. Villalba	30,000	
85	8 February 1946	Estadio Gasómetro, Buenos Aires (N)	Uruguay	2–1	1946 South American Championship	J. B. Villalba, Rodríguez	18,000	
86	2 December 1947	Estadio George Capwell, Guayaquil (N)	Argentina	0–6	1947 South American Championship		20,000	
87	6 December 1947	Estadio George Capwell, Guayaquil (N)	Peru	2–2	1947 South American Championship	J. B. Villalba, Marín	20,000	
88	13 December 1947	Estadio George Capwell, Guayaquil (N)	Uruguay	4–2	1947 South American Championship	Génes (2), Marín, J. B. Villalba	18,000	
89	18 December 1947	Estadio George Capwell, Guayaquil (N)	Bolivia	3–1	1947 South American Championship	Marín, Génes, Avalos	12,000	
90	20 December 1947	Estadio George Capwell, Guayaquil (N)	Colombia	2–0	1947 South American Championship	J. B. Villalba (2)	20,000	
91	23 December 1947	Estadio George Capwell, Guayaquil (N)	Chile	1–0	1947 South American Championship	J. B. Villalba	5,000	
92	30 December 1947	Estadio George Capwell, Guayaquil (N)	Ecuador	4–0	1947 South American Championship	Marín (3), Génes	5,000	
93	6 April 1949	Pacaembu Stadium, São Paulo (N)	Colombia	3–0	1949 South American Championship	López Fretes (2), J. D. Benítez	30,000	
94	10 April 1949	Estádio São Januário, Rio de Janeiro (N)	Ecuador	1–0	1949 South American Championship	Barrios	15,000	
95	13 April 1949	Estádio São Januário, Rio de Janeiro (N)	Peru	3–1	1949 South American Championship	Barrios, Arce, López Fretes	30,000	
96	20 April 1949	Pacaembu Stadium, São Paulo (N)	Uruguay	1–2	1949 South American Championship	Arce	20,000	
97	27 April 1949	Pacaembu Stadium, São Paulo (N)	Chile	4–2	1949 South American Championship	Arce (3), J. D. Benítez	1,000	
98	30 April 1949	Estádio São Januário, Rio de Janeiro (N)	Bolivia	7–0	1949 South American Championship	J. D. Benítez (4), Arce (2), P. Fernández	45,000	
99	8 May 1949	Estádio São Januário, Rio de Janeiro (N)	Brazil	2–1	1949 South American Championship	Avalos, J. D. Benítez	35,000	
100	11 May 1949	Estádio São Januário, Rio de Janeiro (N)	Brazil	0–7	1949 South American Championship		55,000	
101	25 May 1950	Estadio Monumental, Buenos Aires (A)	Argentina	2–2	Copa Rosa Chevallier Boutell	I. Garceron (o.g.), Sosa	—	
102	29 May 1950	Estadio Gasómetro, Buenos Aires (A)	Argentina	0–4	Copa Rosa Chevallier Boutell		—	
103	30 April 1950	Rio de Janeiro (N)	Uruguay	3–2	Copa Trompowski	Avalos, A. López, López Fretes	—	
104	7 May 1950	Estádio São Januário, Rio de Janeiro (A)	Brazil	0–2	Taça Oswaldo Cruz		—	
105	13 May 1950	Pacaembu Stadium, São Paulo (A)	Brazil	3–3	Taça Oswaldo Cruz	Calonga, López Fretes, Sosa	—	
106	29 June 1950	Estádio Durival Britto, Curitiba (N)	Sweden	2–2	1950 FIFA World Cup	López Fretes, A. López	7,903	
107	2 July 1950	Pacaembu Stadium, São Paulo (N)	Italy	0–2	1950 FIFA World Cup		25,811	
108	25 February 1953	Estadio Nacional, Lima (N)	Chile	3–0	1953 South American Championship	R. Fernández (2), Berni	45,000	
109	4 March 1953	Estadio Nacional, Lima (N)	Ecuador	0–0	1953 South American Championship		45,000	
110	8 March 1953	Estadio Nacional, Lima (N)	Peru	2–2	1953 South American Championship	R. Fernández, Berni	45,000	
111	12 March 1953	Estadio Nacional, Lima (N)	Uruguay	2–2	1953 South American Championship	A. López, Berni	35,000	
112	16 March 1953	Estadio Nacional, Lima (N)	Bolivia	2–1	1953 South American Championship	Romero, Berni	15,000	
113	27 March 1953	Estadio Nacional, Lima (N)	Brazil	2–1	1953 South American Championship	A. López, León	35,000	
114	1 April 1953	Estadio Nacional, Lima (N)	Brazil	3–2	1953 South American Championship	A. López, Gavilán, R. Fernández	35,000	
115	14 February 1954	Asunción (H)	Chile	4–0	1954 FIFA World Cup qualification	Lugo, S. Parodi, Hermosilla, J. Parodi	—	
116	21 February 1954	Estadio Nacional, Santiago (A)	Chile	3–1	1954 FIFA World Cup qualification	Lugo (2), J. Parodi	—	
117	7 March 1954	Estadio Club Libertad, Asunción (H)	Brazil	0–1	1954 FIFA World Cup qualification		—	
118	21 March 1954	Maracanã Stadium, Rio de Janeiro (A)	Brazil	1–4	1954 FIFA World Cup qualification	Martínez	174,599	
119	10 April 1954	Estadio Centenario, Montevideo (A)	Uruguay	4–1	Friendly	Romero, Martínez (2), Vazquez	—	
120	18 April 1954	Asunción (H)	Uruguay	1–1	Friendly	Martínez	—	
121	2 March 1955	Estadio Nacional, Santiago (N)	Argentina	3–5	1955 South American Championship	M. Rolón, Martínez, S. Villalba	35,000	
122	9 March 1955	Estadio Nacional, Santiago (N)	Uruguay	1–3	1955 South American Championship	M. Rolón	48,000	
123	16 March 1955	Estadio Nacional, Santiago (N)	Ecuador	2–0	1955 South American Championship	M. Rolón (2)	35,000	
124	20 March 1955	Estadio Nacional, Santiago (N)	Chile	0–5	1955 South American Championship		55,000	
125	23 March 1955	Estadio Nacional, Santiago (N)	Peru	1–1	1955 South American Championship	M. Rolón	25,000	
126	13 November 1955	Maracanã Stadium, Rio de Janeiro (A)	Brazil	0–3	Taça Oswaldo Cruz		65,277	
127	17 November 1955	Pacaembu Stadium, São Paulo (A)	Brazil	3–3	Taça Oswaldo Cruz	H. González, Gómez, Olavo (o.g.)	41,478	
128	21 January 1956	Estadio Centenario, Montevideo (N)	Uruguay	2–4	1956 South American Championship	M. Rolón, Gómez	55,000	
129	29 January 1956	Estadio Centenario, Montevideo (N)	Brazil	0–0	1956 South American Championship		45,000	
130	1 February 1956	Estadio Centenario, Montevideo (N)	Argentina	0–1	1956 South American Championship		20,000	
131	5 February 1956	Estadio Centenario, Montevideo (N)	Peru	1–1	1956 South American Championship	M. Rolón	25,000	
132	12 February 1956	Estadio Centenario, Montevideo (N)	Chile	0–2	1956 South American Championship		4,000	
133	12 June 1956	Estadio Club Libertad, Asunción (H)	Brazil	0–2	Taça Oswaldo Cruz		—	
134	17 June 1956	Estadio Club Libertad, Asunción (H)	Brazil	2–5	Taça Oswaldo Cruz	M. Rolón, D. Jara Saguier	—	
135	15 July 1956	Asunción (H)	Uruguay	2–2	Friendly	Dominguez, H. González	—	
136	15 August 1956	Asunción (H)	Argentina	0–1	Copa Rosa Chevallier Boutell		—	
137	6 June 1957	Asunción (H)	Bolivia	5–2	Copa Paz del Chaco	Agüero (2), Aguilera (2), G. Benitez	15,000	
138	13 June 1957	Asunción (H)	Bolivia	0–1	Copa Paz del Chaco		—	
139	20 June 1957	Estadio El Campín, Bogotá (A)	Colombia	3–2	1958 FIFA World Cup qualification	Á. Jara Saguier, Agüero, Aguilera	—	
140	23 June 1957	Estadio Atanasio Girardot, Medellín (A)	Colombia	2–1	Friendly	Amarilla, Agüero	—	
141	7 July 1957	Estadio Defensores del Chaco, Asunción (H)	Colombia	3–0	1958 FIFA World Cup qualification	E. Jara Saguier, Á. Jara Saguier, Aguilera	—	
142	14 July 1957	Estadio Defensores del Chaco, Asunción (H)	Uruguay	5–0	1958 FIFA World Cup qualification	Amarilla (3), Á. Jara Saguier, Agüero	—	
143	28 July 1957	Estadio Centenario, Montevideo (A)	Uruguay	0–2	1958 FIFA World Cup qualification		—	
144	18 August 1957	La Paz (A)	Bolivia	3–3	Copa Paz del Chaco	Dominguez, Ré (2)	—	
145	21 August 1957	La Paz (A)	Bolivia	1–2	Copa Paz del Chaco	Aguilera	—	
146	20 April 1958	Asunción (H)	Argentina	1–0	Friendly	Aveiro	—	
147	26 April 1958	Buenos Aires (A)	Argentina	0–2	Friendly		—	
148	4 May 1958	Maracanã Stadium, Rio de Janeiro (A)	Brazil	1–5	Taça Oswaldo Cruz	Arévalo	—	
149	7 May 1958	Pacaembu Stadium, São Paulo (A)	Brazil	0–0	Taça Oswaldo Cruz		—	
150	8 June 1958	Idrottsparken, Norrköping (N)	France	3–7	1958 FIFA World Cup	Amarilla (2), Romero	16,518	
151	11 June 1958	Idrottsparken, Norrköping (N)	Scotland	3–2	1958 FIFA World Cup	Agüero, Ré, J. Parodi	11,665	
152	15 June 1958	Tunavallen, Eskilstuna (N)	Yugoslavia	3–3	1958 FIFA World Cup	J. Parodi, Agüero, Romero	13,103	
153	11 March 1959	Estadio Monumental, Buenos Aires (N)	Chile	2–1	First 1959 South American Championship	Aveiro (2)	45,000	
154	15 March 1959	Estadio Monumental, Buenos Aires (N)	Bolivia	5–0	First 1959 South American Championship	Ré (3), Sanabria, Aveiro	40,000	
155	18 March 1959	Estadio Monumental, Buenos Aires (N)	Uruguay	1–3	First 1959 South American Championship	Aveiro	70,000	
156	22 March 1959	Estadio Monumental, Buenos Aires (N)	Argentina	1–3	First 1959 South American Championship	S. Parodi	50,000	
157	29 March 1959	Estadio Monumental, Buenos Aires (N)	Brazil	1–4	First 1959 South American Championship	S. Parodi	40,000	
158	2 April 1959	Estadio Monumental, Buenos Aires (N)	Peru	2–1	First 1959 South American Championship	Aveiro (2)	5,000	
159	1 May 1959	Estadio Centenario, Montevideo (A)	Uruguay	3–1	Friendly	Ré, Nunez (2)	—	
160	5 December 1959	Estadio Modelo, Guayaquil (N)	Brazil	2–3	Second 1959 South American Championship	S. Parodi (2)	35,000	
161	9 December 1959	Estadio Modelo, Guayaquil (N)	Argentina	2–4	Second 1959 South American Championship	Insfrán, Cabral	15,000	
162	22 December 1959	Estadio Modelo, Guayaquil (N)	Uruguay	1–1	Second 1959 South American Championship	S. Parodi	45,000	
163	25 December 1959	Estadio Modelo, Guayaquil (N)	Ecuador	1–3	Second 1959 South American Championship	Gómez (o.g.)	55,000	

Notes

1. A: Abandoned after 79 minutes when the Paraguay squad left the field in protest against the award of a penalty to Argentina.
2. B: Match awarded to Peru due to the unsportsman like behaviour of Paraguay who made one extra substitution.

== Record by opponent ==
Team	Pld	W	D	L	GF	GA	GD	WPCT
Argentina	48	6	8	34	56	125	−69	12.50
Belgium	1	1	0	0	1	0	+1	100.00
Bolivia	10	7	1	2	36	13	+23	70.00
Brazil	28	4	7	17	28	73	−45	14.29
Chile	16	11	0	5	36	26	+10	68.75
Colombia	5	5	0	0	13	3	+10	100.00
Ecuador	7	5	1	1	14	5	+9	71.43
France	1	0	0	1	3	7	−4	0.00
Italy	1	0	0	1	0	2	−2	0.00
Peru	10	3	4	3	17	13	+4	30.00
Scotland	1	1	0	0	3	2	+1	100.00
Sweden	1	0	1	0	2	2	0	0.00
United States	1	0	0	1	0	3	−3	0.00
Uruguay	32	15	6	11	57	52	+5	46.88
Yugoslavia	1	0	1	0	3	3	0	0.00
Total	163	58	29	76	269	329	−60	35.58

Source: Results
