= Estadio Gran Parque Central =

Stadium in Montevideo, Uruguay

Coordinates: 34.884373°S 56.158800°W

Gran Parque Central Stadium
- Estadio Gran Parque Central
- El Parque el Templo Tricolor, El primer estadio mundialista Venue of the 1930 FIFA World Cup
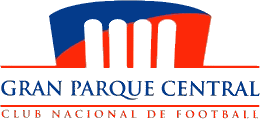

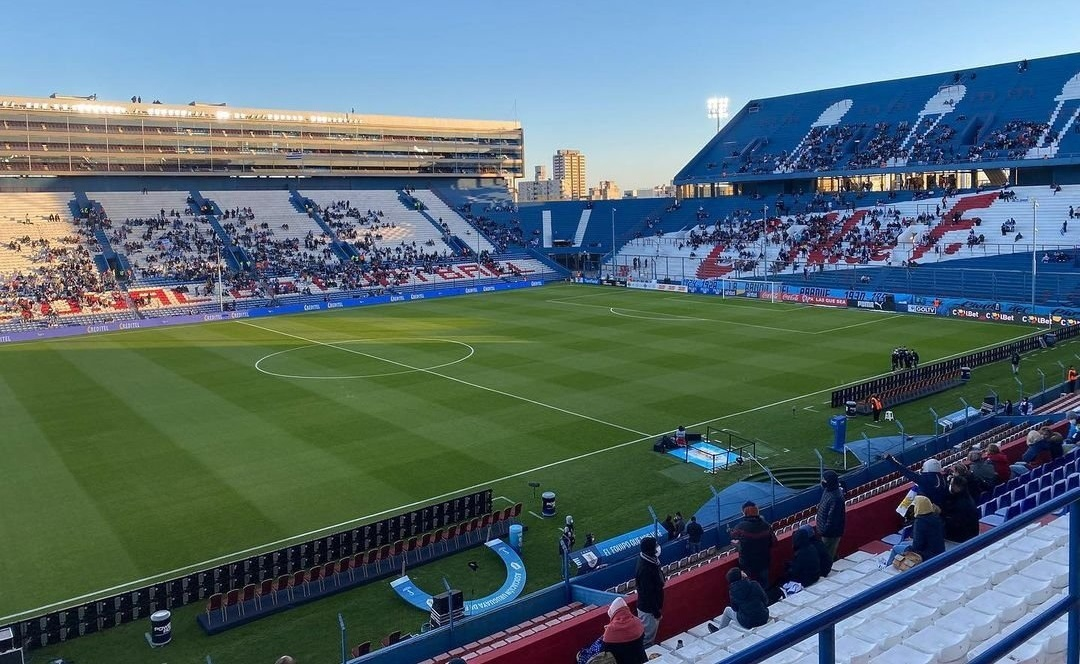
- Interactive map of Gran Parque Central Stadium
- Location: Montevideo, Uruguay
- Owner: Club Nacional de Football
- Capacity: 34,361 (domestic); 28,251 (international)
- Surface: Grass
- Field size: 105 m × 68 m (344 ft × 223 ft)

Construction
- Built: 1898-99
- Opened: 25 May 1900
- Renovated: 1911, 1944, 1974, 2005

Tenants
- Nacional (1901–present); Deutscher Fussball Klub (1900–1909); Uruguay national football team (1900–1930)

Website
- nacional.uy/granparquecentral

The Estadio Gran Parque Central is the stadium of Club Nacional de Football located in Montevideo, Uruguay, near Nacional headquarters (between the streets Carlos Anaya, Jaime Cibils, General Urquiza and Comandante Braga), in the La Blanqueada neighbourhood.

Due to various factors, it is considered a historical stadium. Built in 1900, it is the oldest current stadium in America and the fifteenth in the world. But it mainly stands out for having hosted the 1930 FIFA World Cup opening match, one of the first two matches in the history of the competition, when on 13 July 1930 United States defeated Belgium 3–0 in Group D. FIFA remembered this fact when in 2005 a delegation headed by its president, Joseph Blatter, came to visit the reforms and placed a commemorative plaque at the stadium. This historical fact was remembered by FIFA on two occasions: 1987 and 2005.

In addition, the stadium was also the venue for the Uruguay national team, both in football and in other disciplines. Since its creation and until 1930, it was the main sports arena in Uruguay, so until the inauguration of the Centenario Stadium, the Uruguayan team officiated as a local in the Gran Parque Central. It was also the venue for other important international tournaments, like the 1923 and 1924 South American Championships (current Copa América), the 2015 South American U-20 Championship or the 2021 Women's Copa Libertadores final.

Together with the Centenario Stadium, it is the Uruguayan stadium with the best artificial light, after a reform carried out in 2021. It is also, after the Centenario, the stadium in which the Uruguayan football team has played more official matches. In addition, on 31 October 2018, it was the stadium to register the highest ticket sales for a stadium in Uruguay without being the Centenario, selling the 34,000 tickets available.

== History ==
The Estadio Gran Parque Central is an important landmark in the history of Uruguay, not only because of its relevance in sports, but also for its bonds with the rich history of Uruguayans and their patriotic feelings.

Before the existence of Parque Central as a sports ground, in exactly the same location (which used to be known as "Quinta de la Paraguaya"), Uruguay's national hero José Artigas was named Jefe de los Orientales (leader of the Uruguayan people) in 1811.

=== The beginnings ===
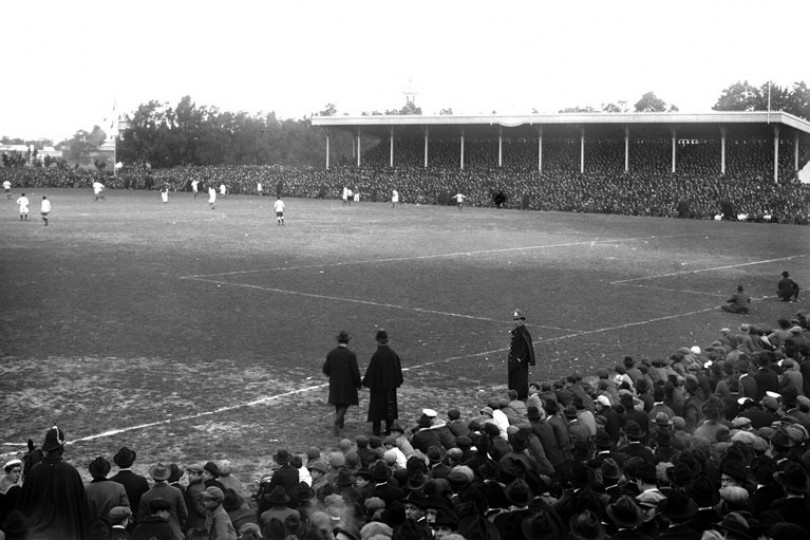
In its beginnings, the Gran Parque Central stadium had wooden grandstands

The Parque Central was opened for the practice of sports in 1900, having been the site of Montevideo's bullring until the abolition of this activity. At first, the tenants of the stadium were Deutscher Fussball Klub for their home games at the first Uruguayan league championship in the 1900s. As a sports stadium, the Parque Central was inaugurated on March 25, 1900 with a match between the Deutscher Fussball Klub and the CURCC (Central Uruguay Railway Cricket Club). The final score was CURCC 2 – Deutscher 0. Before the game, a lunch was served at Hotel Lanata, among personalities from the Government and leaders of the clubs. According to some chronicles from that period, the inauguration included the Don Bosco Band and the "Flora" gunship Band. There was also a special highlight with a Scottish skirt dancer who took the 7,000 people present by surprise, as they were unaware of the Scottish traditions. Two days after Nacional would meet the Deutscher F. K. in a game that ended 1–1.

The land was the property of "Tranvias a la Union y Maroñas", a German streetcar company whose employees were the founders of the Deutscher F. K. The venue consisted of four tennis courts and two football fields. By 1901, the streetcar company conceded Nacional the second field as they entered the AUF league. From that year until now, the Estadio Gran Parque Central has witnessed several championships won by Nacional (the last one in 2010/2011 season) and Uruguay national football team.

Many parts of the stadium remain unchanged since 1900, like the old "Mirador" located behind the Tribuna Atilio García stand, although the current pitch is different from that of the beginning of the past century. The current orientation is east-west, opposite to the first one that was north-south, and there was another field in the actual place of the east stands and eastern part of the pitch.

Until 1930, the Parque Central was the main sports venue in Uruguay. It was only with the building of the Estadio Centenario that Nacional's stadium was superseded.

=== Time of modernization ===
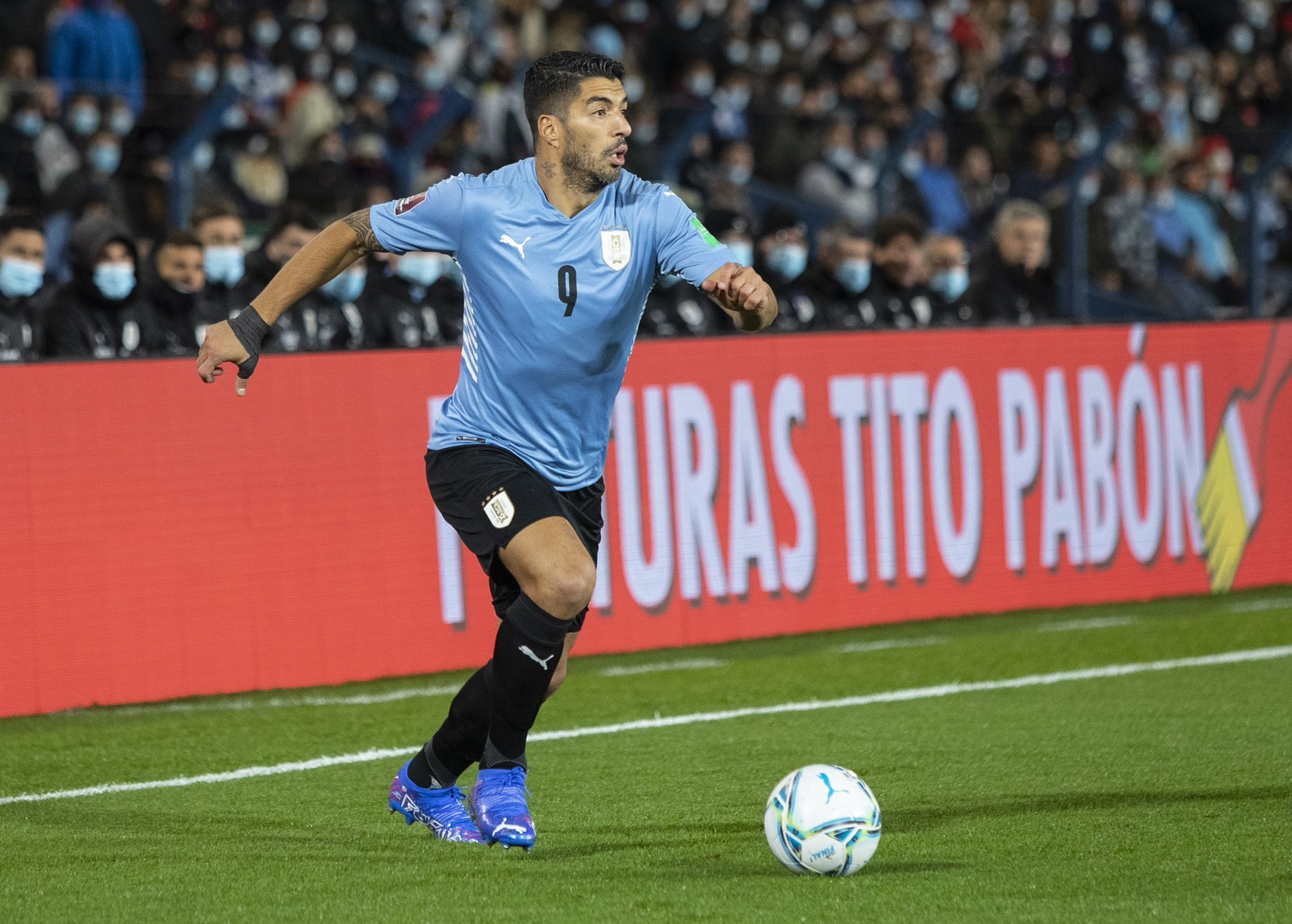
Luis Suárez playing a match between Uruguay and Colombia, for the qualifiers for the 2022 FIFA World Cup.

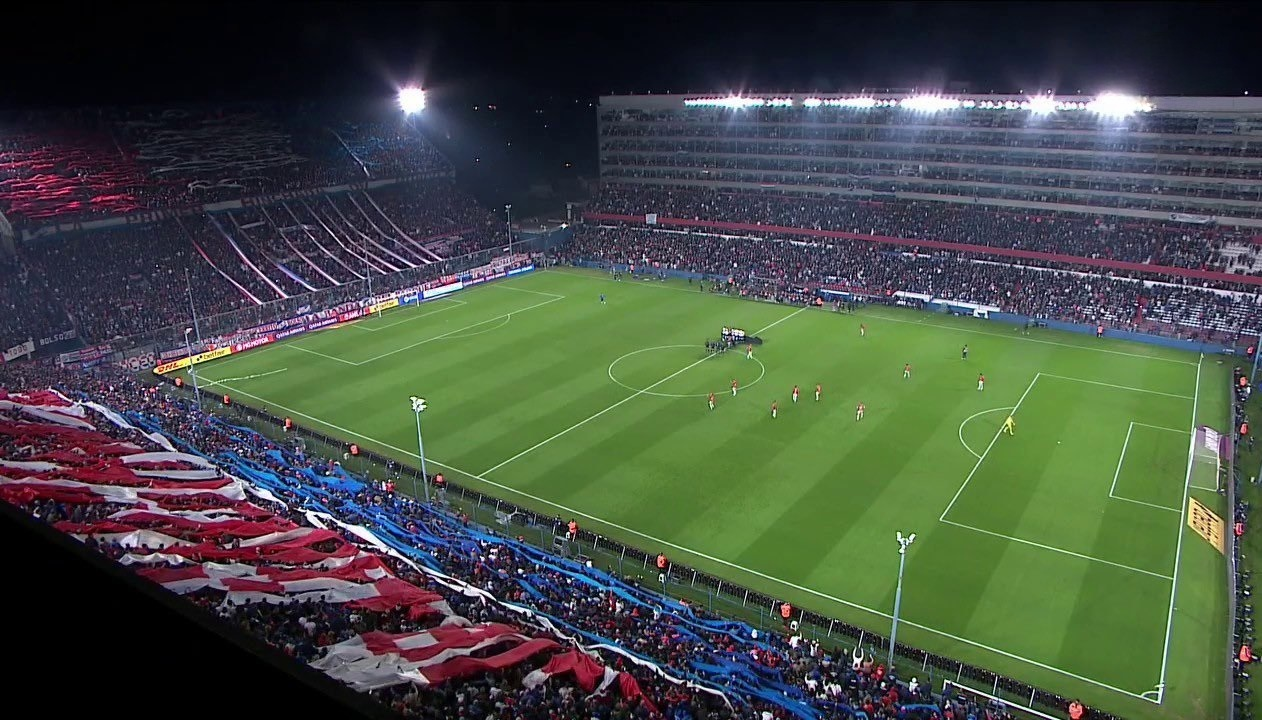
Present situation of the Gran Parque Central stadium.

The 2003 reform allowed its reopening in 2005. In this year, through the efforts of Nacional fans and the sale of modern, special seats in the Tribuna José María Delgado stand, the Estadio Gran Parque Central was remodelled once again. The aim of this remodelling was to meet international football standards, which would allow Nacional to play home games for the Uruguayan Championship and the Copa Libertadores at its historic stadium. Over the years, the stadium began to be expanded, going from 20,000 people to a capacity of 34,000 spectators, constantly growing. This increase in capacity is accompanied by works to modernize its facilities, which allowed the team to no longer have to leave the tricolor stage for any kind of event.

These changes allowed the Gran Parque Central to host the 2015 South American Under-20 tournament, the 2021 Women's Copa Libertadores final and other events, both sporting and musical. In turn, in recent years it was requested as a training ground for different teams and international teams.

Together with the Centenario Stadium, it is the Uruguayan stadium with the best artificial light, with lighting of 1,500 lux, after a renovation carried out in 2021. In addition, in 2022, the stadium installed a modern giant screen 15.8 meters long by 5.2 meters high, being the screen with the largest inch in the entire country.

== Remodellings ==
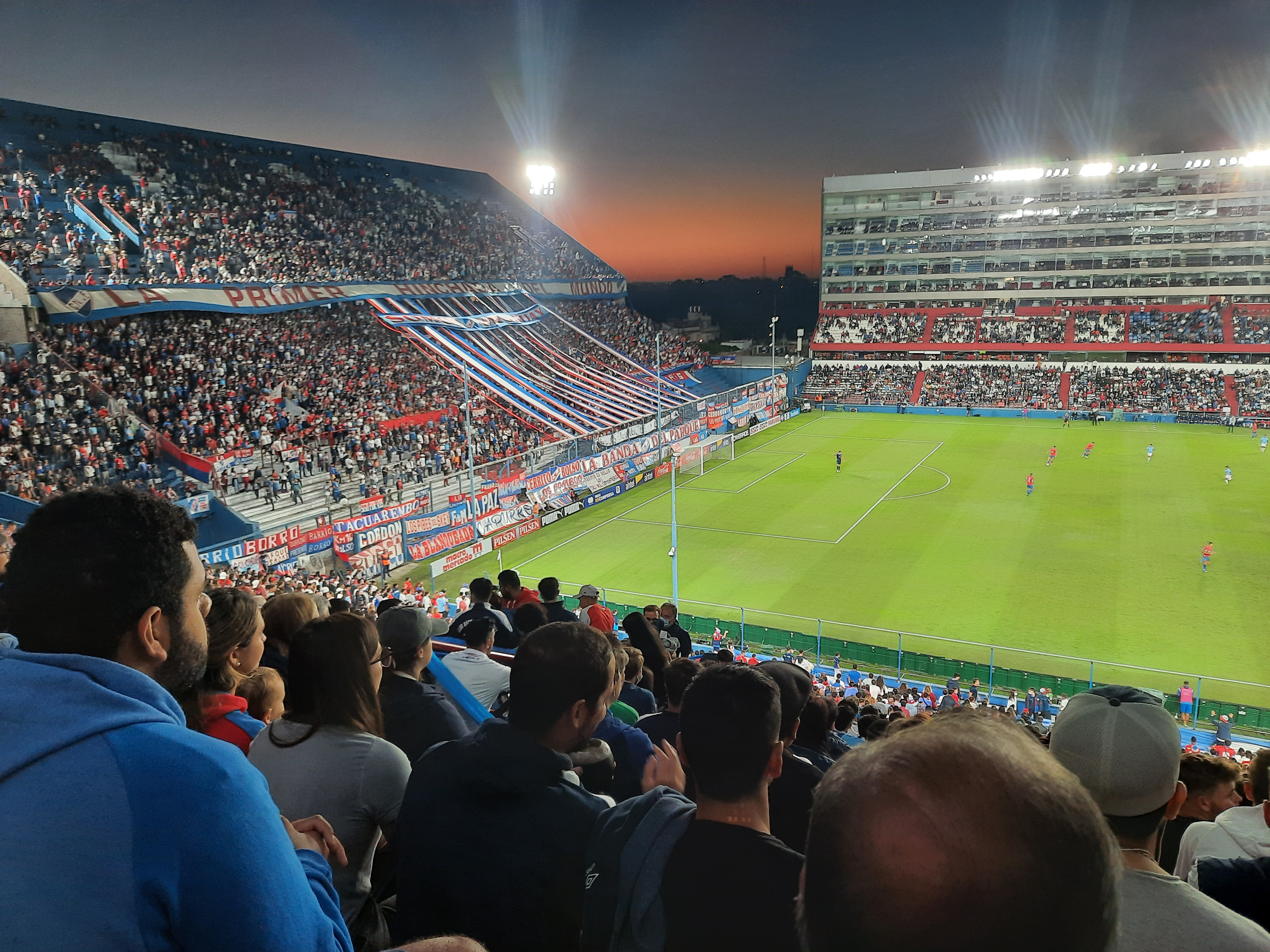

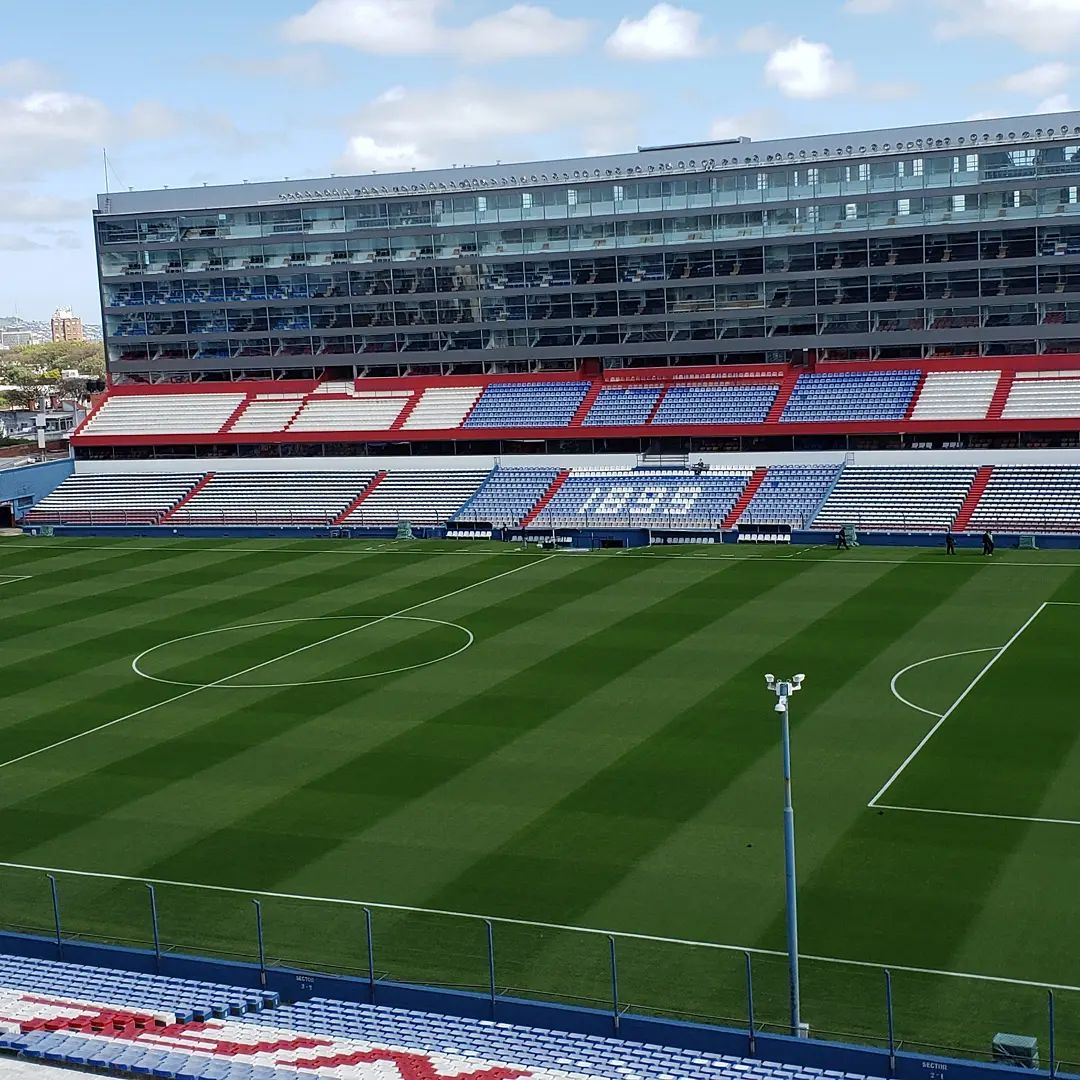

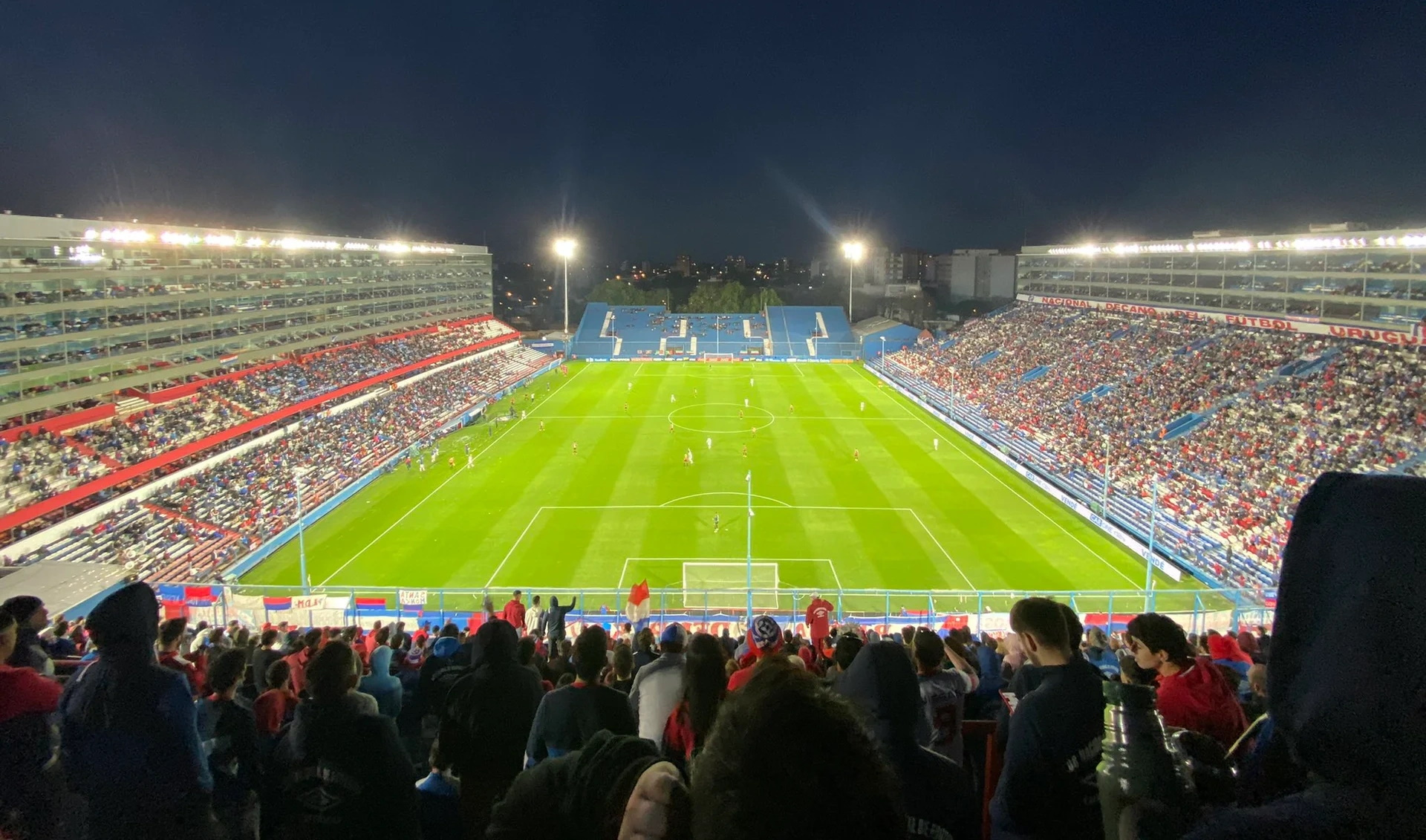

Burnt almost completely after the fire of 1911, it was rebuilt a couple of years later. The second remodelling of the Estadio Gran Parque Central took place in 1944. On that occasion, improvements of the pitch and the four stands were made, and more seats were added in the main stand, Tribuna José María Delgado.

Thirty years later, the Parque Central was remodelled once again due to a fire that destroyed part of the stadium.

== Acknowledgements ==
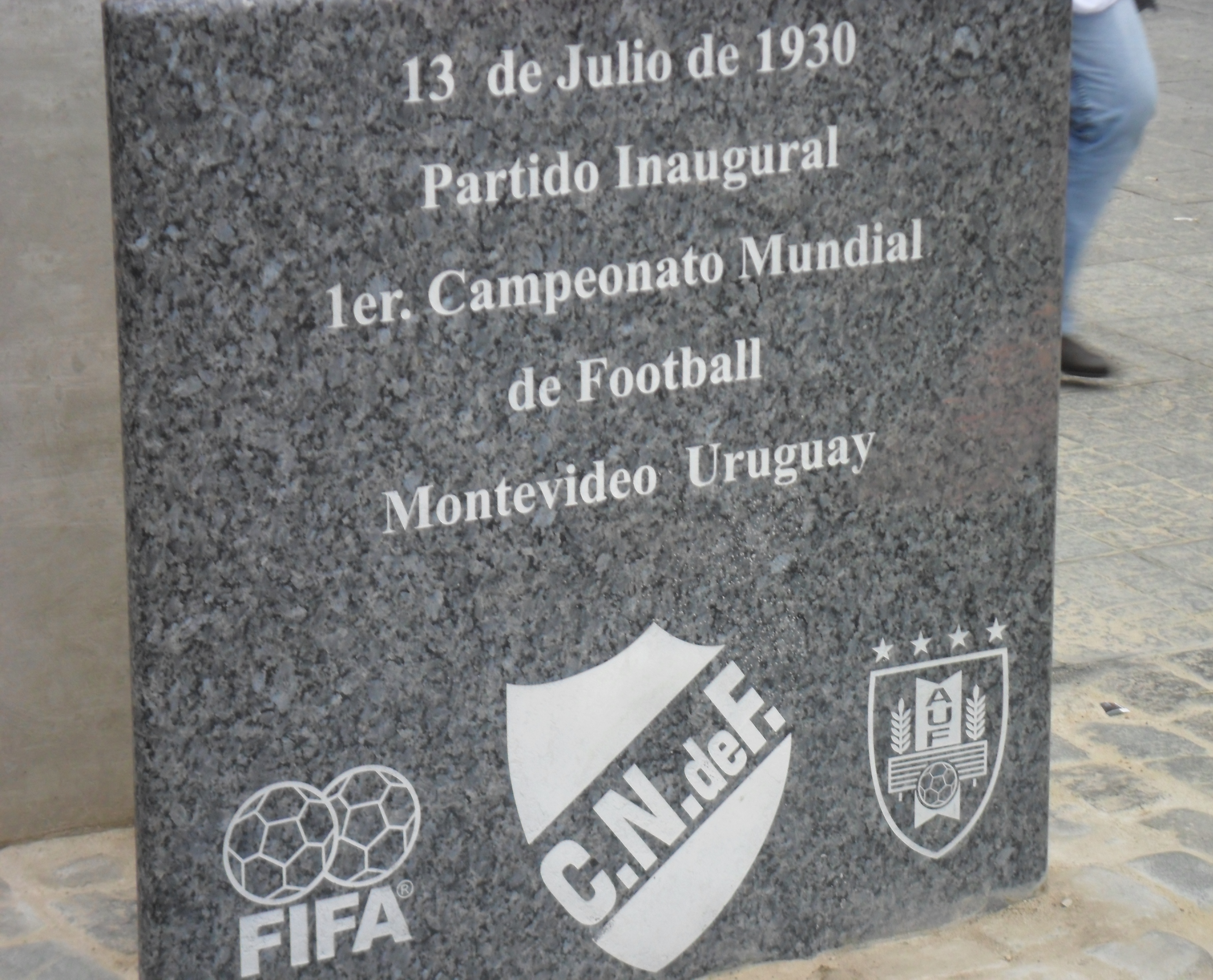
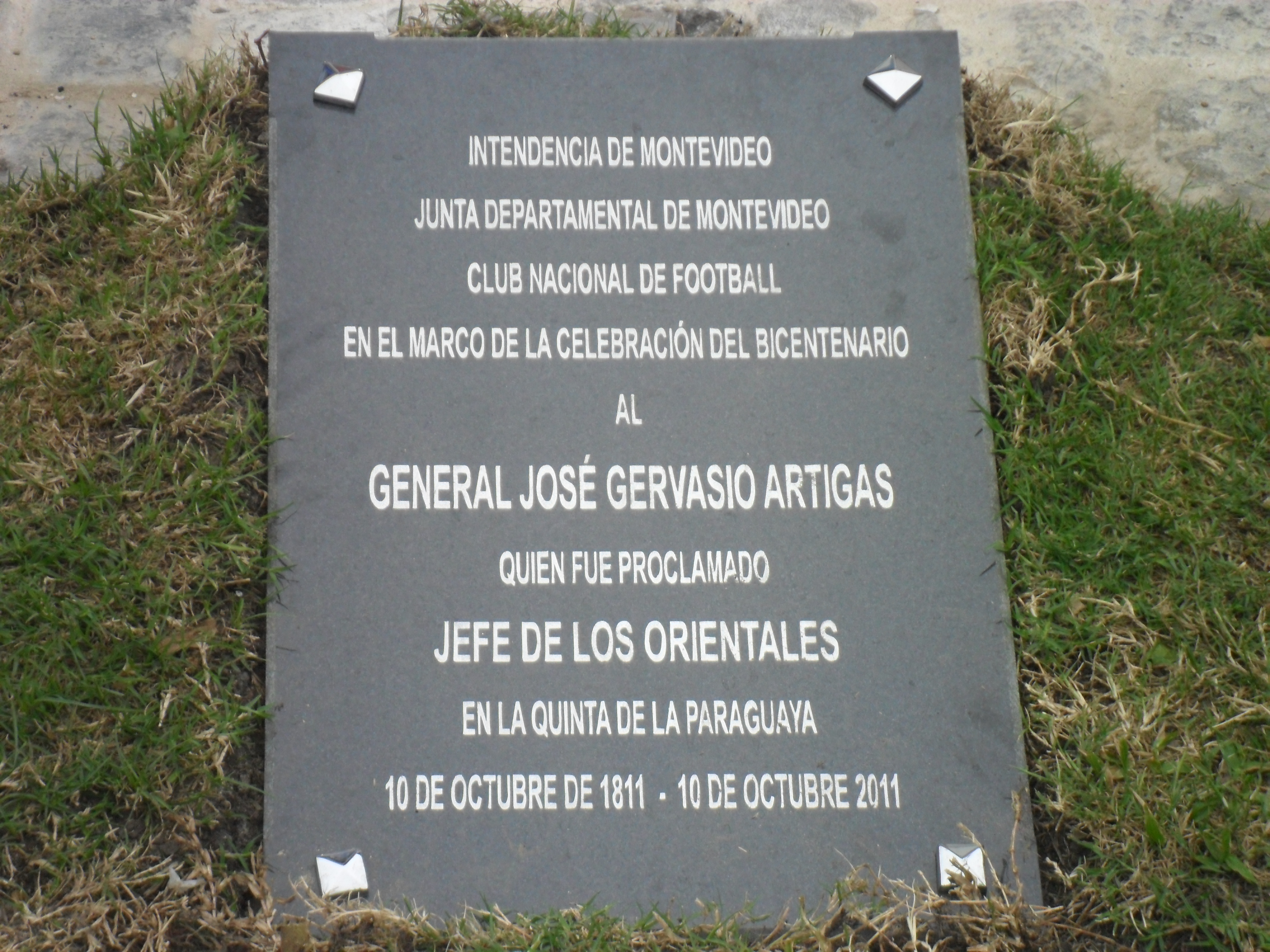
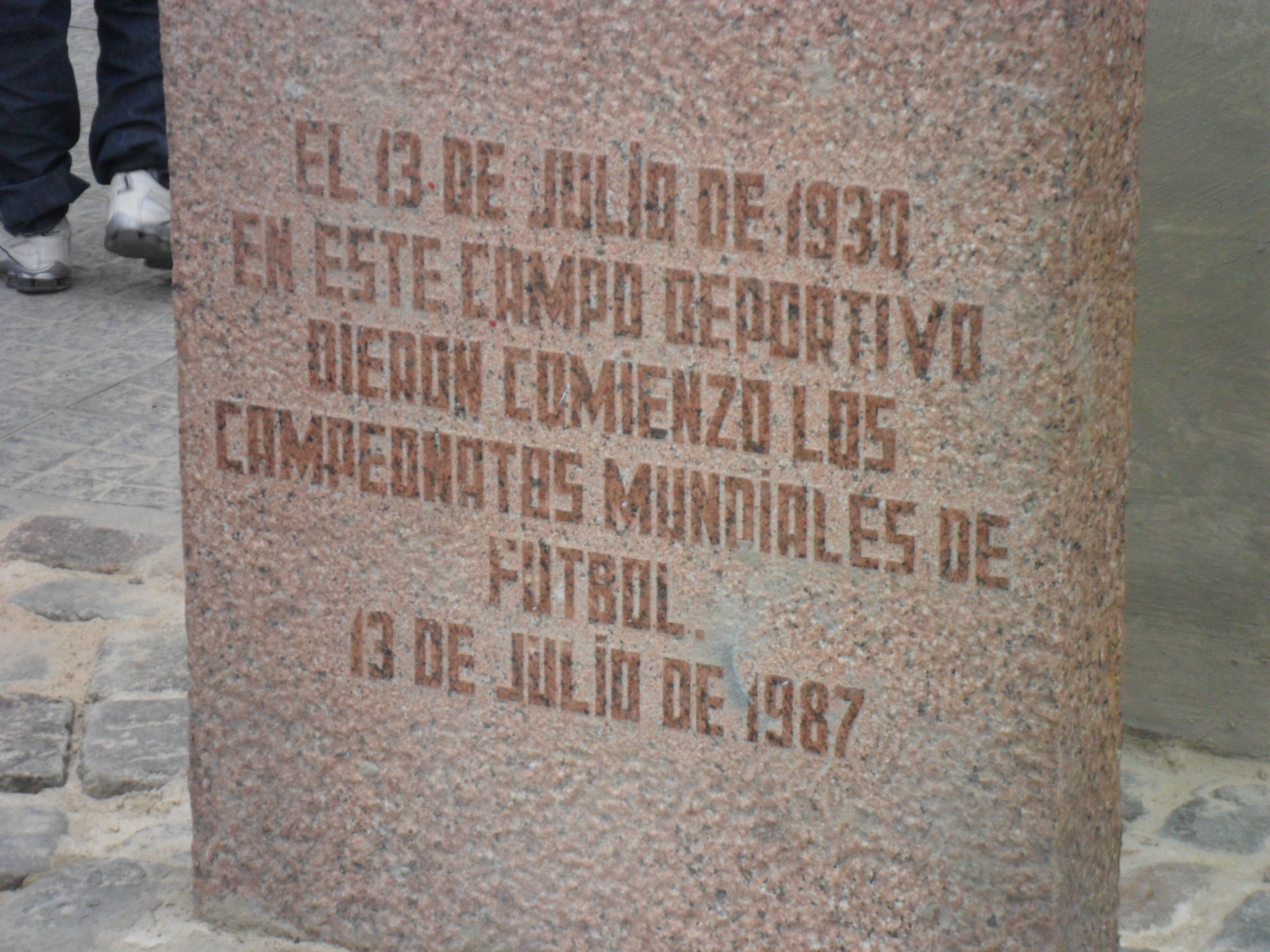
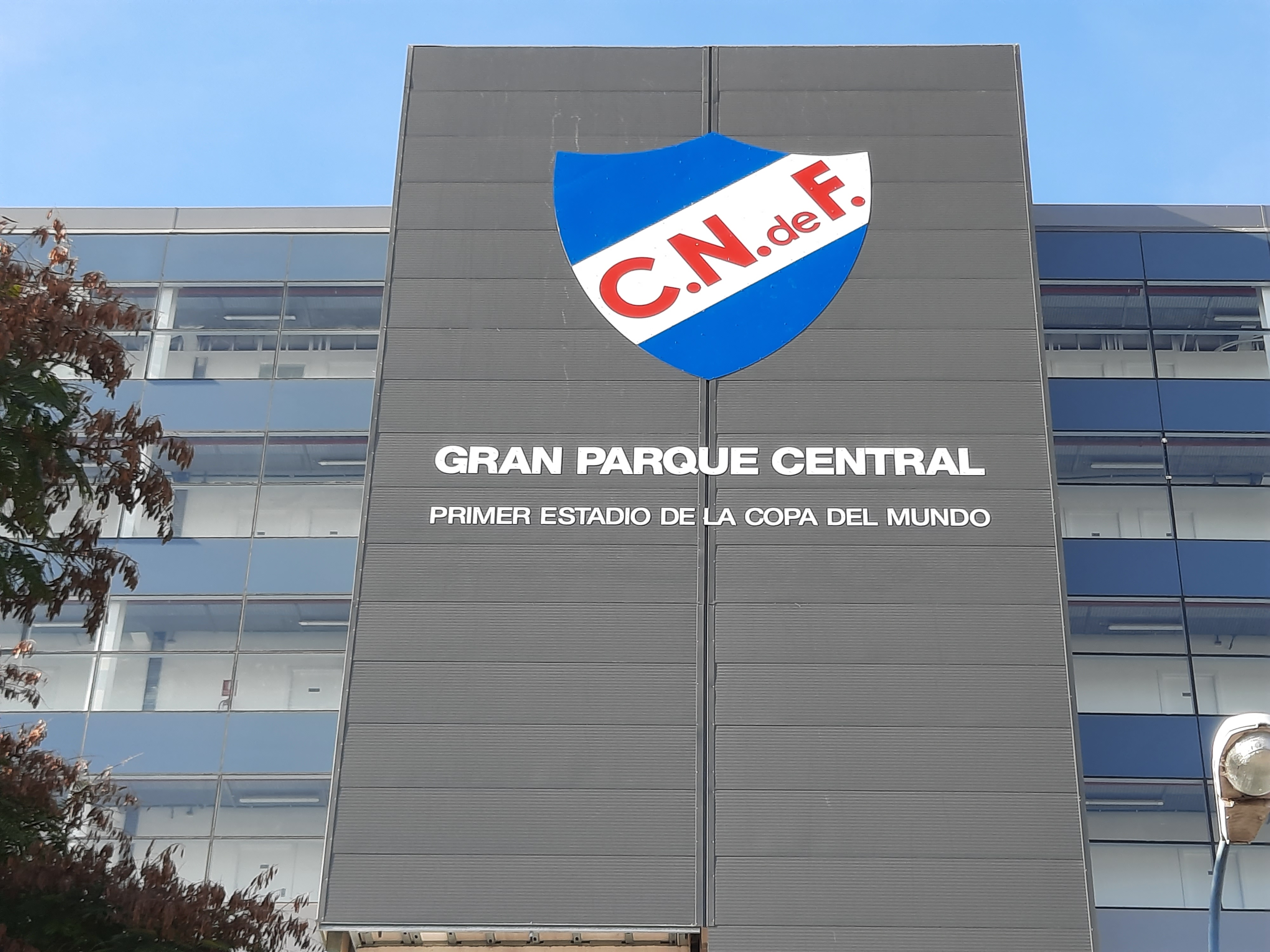
Some acknowledgments to the Gran Parque Central Stadium

The Gran Parque Central stadium is commonly called by the Tricolor supporters as the first World Cup stadium. In this regard, the Tricolor Temple has received several awards, like a plaque placed by FIFA in 2005 commemorating the celebration in this stadium of the first match in the history of the FIFA World Cups.

For the occasion, a FIFA delegation came to visit the works, led by its president, Joseph Blatter, with Eugenio Figueredo, Nicolás Leoz, Ricardo Texeira and Julio Grondona.

Years later, another FIFA delegation, headed by its president Gianni Infantino, visited the Gran Parque Central stadium, emphasizing that "it is a World Cup Stadium, pure history" and that "when you are in such a historic place it is a very emotional strong".

«The Gran Parque Central stadium, home of the National Football Club and historical heritage of world football. Why? The first match in the history of the FIFA World Cup was played there (...) "It is a great pride to be present here with our entire entourage. Uruguay has written a golden page in the history of football"» (Joseph S. Blatter)
FIFA Official Website, in 2005.

«The Central Park is the history of football. It's the first stadium, the first World Cup, the first game... so he's the true football legend, it's very impressive (...) When you're in such a historic place, it's a very strong emotion».
Gianni Infantino, president of FIFA, in 2016.

«It's wonderful... just thinking that the first match of the first World Cup was played here, is something to go down in history and a satisfaction for us to be here».
Fernando Hierro, ex footballer, in 2016.

«It is a stadium with a lot of history (...) This is, perhaps, the most important in the world in the football history».
Fernando Niembro, journalist at ESPN, in 2022.

== Major international tournaments ==
The Gran Parque Central stadium hosted several international sporting events. Regarding competitions with national teams, the Nacional stadium hosted some tournaments, highlighting the 1923 South American Championship, the 1924 South American Championship, the 1930 FIFA World Cup or the 2015 South American U-20 Championship. In the case of the South American Championships (currently known as Copa América), the Gran Parque Central was the only venue, while in the 1930 World Cup and in the 2015 South American U-20 Championship it hosted some matches. During the 1930 World Cup, teams such as Argentina and Brazil made their World Cup debuts at this stadium.

This stadium was the headquarters of the Uruguay national team, both in football and in other sports. Until 1930 it was the main sports arena in Uruguay, recently surpassed by the Estadio Centenario, so until the inauguration of the Estadio Centenario, Parque Central was the stadium where Uruguay played its home games. In recent years, the Uruguayan rugby team played some matches here too. It is also common for foreign teams to opt for this stadium as a training camp prior to international matches.

The Uruguay national football team has never lost a game in international tournaments in the Gran Parque Central stadium.

=== 1923 Copa América ===
During the 1923 Copa América, the stadium hosted all the matches:

29 October 1923	Argentina	4–3	Paraguay	Gran Parque Central, Montevideo
	Saruppo 18'; Aguirre 58', 77', 86'		Rivas 10'; Zelada 50'; Fretes 75'	Attendance: 20,000; Referee: Ángel Minoli (Uruguay)

4 November 1923	Uruguay	2–0	Paraguay	Gran Parque Central, Montevideo
	Scarone 11'; Petrone 88'			Attendance: 20,000; Referee: Servando Pérez (Argentina)

11 November 1923	Paraguay	1–0	Brazil	Gran Parque Central, Montevideo
	I. López 56'			Attendance: 15,000; Referee: Servando Pérez (Argentina)

18 November 1923	Argentina	2–1	Brazil	Gran Parque Central, Montevideo
	Onzari 11'; Saruppo 76'		Nilo 15'	Attendance: 15,000; Referee: Miguel Barba (Paraguay)

25 November 1923	Uruguay	2–1	Brazil	Gran Parque Central, Montevideo
	Petrone 56'; Cea 75'		Nilo 59'	Attendance: 20,000; Referee: Servando Pérez (Argentina)

2 December 1923	Uruguay	2–0	Argentina	Gran Parque Central, Montevideo
	Petrone 28'; Somma 88'			Attendance: 22,000; Referee: Antônio Carneiro de Campos (Brazil)

=== 1924 Copa América ===
During the 1924 Copa América, the stadium hosted all the matches:

12 October 1924	Argentina	0–0	Paraguay	Gran Parque Central, Montevideo
				Attendance: 12,000; Referee: Ángel Minoli (Uruguay)

19 October 1924	Uruguay	5–0	Chile	Gran Parque Central, Montevideo
	Petrone 40', 53', 88'; Zingone 73'; Romano 78'			Attendance: 15,000; Referee: Eduardo Jara (Paraguay)

25 October 1924	Argentina	2–0	Chile	Gran Parque Central, Montevideo
	Sosa 5'; Loyarte 78'			Attendance: 15,000; Referee: Ángel Minoli (Uruguay)

26 October 1924	Uruguay	3–1	Paraguay	Gran Parque Central, Montevideo
	Petrone 28'; Romano 37'; Cea 53'		Sosa 77'	Attendance: 14,000; Referee: Alberto Parodi (Chile)

1 November 1924	Paraguay	3–1	Chile	Gran Parque Central, Montevideo
	González 15', 52'; López 33'		Arellano 6'	Attendance: 10,000; Referee: Servando Pérez (Argentina)

2 November 1924	Uruguay	0–0	Argentina	Gran Parque Central, Montevideo
				Attendance: 20,000; Referee: Carlos Fanta (Chile)

=== 1930 FIFA World Cup ===
During the 1930 FIFA World Cup, the stadium hosted six matches:

13 July 1930	United States	3–0	Belgium	Gran Parque Central, Montevideo
15:00	McGhee 23'; Florie 45'; Patenaude 69'			Attendance: 18,346; Referee: José Macias (Argentina)

14 July 1930	Yugoslavia	2–1	Brazil	Gran Parque Central, Montevideo
12:45	Tirnanic 21'; Bek 30'		Preguinho 62'	Attendance: 24,059; Referee: Aníbal Tejada (Uruguay)

15 July 1930	Argentina	1–0	France	Gran Parque Central, Montevideo
16:00	Monti 81'			Attendance: 23,409; Referee: Almeida Rego (Brazil)

16 July 1930	Chile	3–0	Mexico	Gran Parque Central, Montevideo
14:45	Vidal 3', 65'; Rosas 51' (o.g.)			Attendance: 9,249; Referee: Henry Cristophe (Bélgica)

17 July 1930	Yugoslavia	4–0	Bolivia	Gran Parque Central, Montevideo
12:45	Bek 60', 67'; Marjanovic 65'; Vujadinovic 85'			Attendance: 18,306; Referee: Francisco Mateucci (Uruguay)

17 July 1930	United States	3–0	Paraguay	Gran Parque Central, Montevideo
14:45	Patenaude 10', 15', 50'			Attendance: 18,306; Referee: José Macias (Argentina)

== Major games ==
=== 2021 Copa Libertadores Femenina ===
Conmebol determined that the tournament would have the final match in the Gran Parque Central stadium, in Uruguay:

21 November 2021	Santa Fe (Colombia)	0–2	(Brazil) Corinthians	Gran Parque Central, Montevideo
			Adriana 10'; Gabi Portilho 42'	Attendance: 15,000; Referee: Laura Fortunato (Argentina); VAR: Salomé Di Iorio (Argentina)

== Concerts ==
- Elton John — 1995, 2013
- Erasure — 1990
- Joaquin Sabina — 2006
- Ricardo Arjona — 2006
- Sheryl Crow — 1995
- Violetta - 2015

== See also ==
- List of football stadiums in Uruguay
- Lists of stadiums

Events and tenants
Preceded by None	FIFA World Cup; Opening Venue; 1930	Succeeded by All 8 venues used for the 1934 FIFA World Cup, matches on the first day were all played at the same time

Preceded by Estádio das Laranjeiras; Rio de Janeiro	South American Championship; Finals Venue; 1923	Succeeded by Estadio Gran Parque Central; Montevideo
Preceded by Estadio Gran Parque Central; Montevideo	South American Championship; Finals Venue; 1924	Succeeded by Multiple venues
Preceded by -	FIFA World Cup; Inaugural Venue; 1930	Succeeded by Multiple venues
Preceded by Estadio José Amalfitani; Buenos Aires	Copa Libertadores Femenina; Final Venue; 2021	Succeeded by Estadio Rodrigo Paz Delgado; Quito
