= Primera División de Paraguay topscorers =

The following article contains a year-by-year list and statistics of football topscorers in the Primera División de Paraguay (Paraguayan First Division).

== Topscorers by year ==
The following list only comprises the professional era and is missing data from 1906 to 1934 (amateur era).

Also, since 2008 the Paraguayan football association (APF) awards two national champions per year; one for the Torneo Apertura and another for the Torneo Clausura. Therefore, the following legends are used from 2008 and on:

- [A] = Apertura
- [C] = Clausura
- [O] = Overall topscorer for that year

Year	Player	Club	Goals
1935	(Paraguay) Pedro Osorio	Cerro Porteño	18
1936	(Paraguay) Flaminio Silva	Olimpia	34
1937	(Paraguay) Francisco Sosa	Cerro Porteño	21
1938	(Paraguay) Martín Flor (Paraguay) Amado Salinas	Cerro Porteño; Libertad	17
1939	(Paraguay) Teófilo Salinas	Libertad	28
1940	(Paraguay) José Vinsac	Cerro Porteño	30
1941	(Paraguay) Benjamín Laterza (Paraguay) Fabio Franco	Cerro Porteño; Nacional	18
1942	(Paraguay) Francisco Sosa	Cerro Porteño	23
1943	(Paraguay) Atilio Mellone	Guaraní	27
1944	(Paraguay) Porfirio Rolón (Paraguay) Sixto Noceda	Libertad; Presidente Hayes	18
1945	(Paraguay) Porfirio Rolón	Libertad	18
1946	(Paraguay) Leocadio Marín	Olimpia	26
1947	(Paraguay) Leocadio Marín	Olimpia	27
1948	(Paraguay) Fabio Franco	Nacional	24
1949	(Paraguay) Darío Jara Saguier	Cerro Porteño	18
1950	(Paraguay) Darío Jara Saguier	Cerro Porteño	18
1951	(Paraguay) Antonio Ramón Gómez	Libertad	19
1952	(Paraguay) Antonio Ramón Gómez (Paraguay) Rubén Fernández	Libertad; Libertad	16
1953	(Paraguay) Antonio Acosta	Presidente Hayes	15
1954	(Paraguay) Máximo Rolón	Libertad	24
1955	(Paraguay) Máximo Rolón	Libertad	25
1956	(Paraguay) Máximo Rolón	Libertad	23
1957	(Paraguay) Juan Bautista Agüero	Olimpia	14
1958	(Paraguay) Juan Bautista Agüero	Olimpia	16
1959	(Paraguay) Ramón Rodríguez	River Plate	17
1960	(Paraguay) Gilberto Penayo	Cerro Porteño	18
1961	(Paraguay) Justo Pastor Leiva	Guaraní	17
1962	(Paraguay) Cecilio Martínez	Nacional	19
1963	(Paraguay) Juan Cabañas	Libertad	17
1964	(Paraguay) Genaro García (Paraguay) Anastacio Jara (Paraguay) Antonio González	Guaraní; Sol de América; Rubio Ñú	8
1965	(Paraguay) Genaro García	Guaraní	15
1966	(Paraguay) Celino Mora	Cerro Porteño	14
1967	(Paraguay) Sebastián Fleitas Miranda	Libertad	18
1968	(Paraguay) Pedro Antonio Cibils	Libertad	13
1969	(Paraguay) Benicio Ferreira	Olimpia	13
1970	(Paraguay) Saturnino Arrúa	Cerro Porteño	19
1971	(Paraguay) Cristóbal Maldonado	Libertad	11
1972	(Paraguay) Saturnino Arrúa	Cerro Porteño	17
1973	(Paraguay) Mario Beron (Paraguay) Clemente Rolón	Cerro Porteño; River Plate	15
1974	(Paraguay) Mario Beron (Paraguay) Fermín Cabrera	Cerro Porteño; Sportivo Luqueño	10
1975	(Paraguay) Hugo Kiesse	Olimpia	12
1976	(Paraguay) Arsenio Meza	River Plate	11
1977	(Paraguay) Gustavo Fanego	Guaraní	12
1978	(Paraguay) Enrique Villalba	Olimpia	10
1979	(Paraguay) Edgar Ozuna	Capitán Figari	10
1980	(Paraguay) Miguel Michelagnoli	Olimpia	11
1981	(Paraguay) Eulalio Mora	Guaraní	9
1982	(Paraguay) Pedro Fernánez	River Plate	13
1983	(Paraguay) Rafael Bobadilla	Olimpia	14
1984	(Paraguay) Amancio Mereles (Paraguay) Milciades Morel	Cerro Porteño	12
1985	(Paraguay) Adriano Samaniego	Olimpia	19
1986	(Paraguay) Félix Ricardo Torres	Sol de América	13
1987	(Paraguay) Félix Brítez Román	Cerro Porteño	11
1988	(Paraguay) Raúl Vicente Amarilla	Olimpia	17
1989	(Paraguay) Jorge López	San Lorenzo	16
1990	(Paraguay) Buenaventura Ferreira (Paraguay) Romerito	Libertad / Cerro Porteño; Sportivo Luqueño	17
1991	(Paraguay) Carlos Luis Torres (Paraguay) Lilio Torales	Olimpia; Atl. Colegiales	12
1992	(Paraguay) Felipe Nery Franco	Libertad	13
1993	(Paraguay) Francisco Ferreira	Sportivo Luqueño	13
1994	(Argentina) Héctor Núñez	Cerro Porteño	27
1995	(Argentina) Héctor Núñez	Cerro Porteño	17
1996	(Paraguay) Arístides Rojas	Guaraní	22
1997	(Paraguay) Luis Molinas	Nacional / Tembetary	13
1998	(Paraguay) Mauro Caballero	Olimpia	21
1999	(Brazil) Gauchinho	Cerro Porteño	22
2000	(Paraguay) Francisco Ferreira	Cerro Porteño	23
2001	(Paraguay) Mauro Caballero	Cerro Porteño / Libertad	13
2002	(Paraguay) Juan Samudio	Libertad	23
2003	(Paraguay) Erwin Avalos	Cerro Porteño	16
2004	(Paraguay) Juan Samudio	Libertad	22
2005	(Paraguay) Dante López	Nacional / Olimpia	21
2006	(Uruguay) Hernán Rodrigo López	Libertad	27
2007	(Paraguay) Fabio Ramos (Paraguay) Pablo Zeballos	Nacional; Sol de América	15
2008 (A)	(Paraguay) Fabio Escobar	Nacional	13
2008 (C)	(Paraguay) Edgar Benítez	Sol de América	14
2008 (O)	(Paraguay) Edgar Benítez	Sol de América	20
2009 (A)	(Paraguay) Pablo Velázquez	Rubio Ñú	16
2009 (C)	(Paraguay) César Cáceres Cañete	Guaraní	11
2009 (O)	(Paraguay) Pablo Velázquez	Rubio Ñú	26
2010 (A)	(Brazil) Rodrigo Teixeira (Paraguay) Pablo Zeballos	Guaraní; Cerro Porteño	16
2010 (C)	(Argentina) Juan Carlos Ferreyra (Argentina) Roberto Nanni	Olimpia; Cerro Porteño	12
2010 (O)	(Paraguay) Pablo Zeballos	Cerro Porteño	24
2011 (A)	(Paraguay) Pablo Zeballos	Olimpia	13
2011 (C)	(Paraguay) Freddy Bareiro	Cerro Porteño	13
2011 (O)	(Paraguay) Pablo Zeballos	Olimpia	25
2012 (A)	(Paraguay) José Maria Ortigoza	Sol de América	13
2012 (C)	(Paraguay) Diego Centurión (Paraguay) José Ariel Núñez	Club Guaraní; Libertad	13
2012 (O)	(Paraguay) Pablo Velázquez	Libertad	16
2013 (A)	(Paraguay) Julián Benítez	Nacional	13
2013 (C)	(Uruguay) Hernán Rodrigo López	Sportivo Luqueño	17
2013 (O)	(Uruguay) Hernán Rodrigo López	Sportivo Luqueño	17
2014 (A)	(Uruguay) Hernán Rodrigo López (Paraguay) Christian Ovelar	Libertad; Sol de América	19
2014 (C)	(Paraguay) Fernando Fernández	Guaraní	17
2014 (O)	(Paraguay) Fernando Fernández	Guaraní	31
2015 (A)	(Paraguay) Fernando Fernández (Paraguay) José Ortigoza (Paraguay) Santiago Salcedo	Guaraní; Cerro Porteño; Sol de América	11
2015 (C)	(Paraguay) Santiago Salcedo	Sol de América	19
2015 (O)	(Paraguay) Santiago Salcedo	Sol de América	30
2016 (A)	(Paraguay) Brian Montenegro	Nacional	18
2016 (C)	(Paraguay) Ernesto Álvarez (Paraguay) Cecilio Domínguez	Sol de América; Cerro Porteño	14
2016 (O)	(Paraguay) Santiago Salcedo	Sol de América	26
2017 (A)	(Paraguay) Santiago Salcedo	Libertad	15
2017 (C)	(Paraguay) Rodrigo Bogarín (Argentina) Diego Churín	Guaraní; Cerro Porteño	11
2017 (O)	(Paraguay) Alfio Oviedo	Independiente CG / Cerro Porteño	19
2018 (A)	(Paraguay) Néstor Camacho	Olimpia	14
2018 (C)	(Paraguay) Óscar Cardozo	Libertad	15
2018 (O)	(Paraguay) Óscar Cardozo	Libertad	23
2019 (A)	(Paraguay) William Mendieta (Paraguay) Roque Santa Cruz	Olimpia; Olimpia	11
2019 (C)	(Paraguay) Roque Santa Cruz	Olimpia	15
2019 (O)	(Paraguay) Roque Santa Cruz	Olimpia	26
2020 (A)	(Paraguay) Sebastián Ferreira	Libertad	13
2020 (C)	(Paraguay) Jorge Recalde	Olimpia	9
2020 (O)	(Paraguay) Roque Santa Cruz	Olimpia	17
2021 (A)	(Paraguay) Leonardo Villagra	Nacional	10
2021 (C)	(Paraguay) Sebastián Ferreira	Libertad	9
2021 (O)	(Paraguay) Leonardo Villagra	Nacional	14

== Topscorers by club ==
The number of topscorers included in the following table only represent the overall topscorers for the entire year (those labeled with a [O] since 2008). Topscorers for specific tournaments (like Apertura [A] and Clausura [C]) are not included.

Rank	Club	Number of topscorers
1	Cerro Porteño	24
2	Libertad	22
3	Olimpia	17
4	Guaraní	8
5	Nacional	7
6	Sol de América	6
7	River Plate	4
7	Sportivo Luqueño	4
9	Presidente Hayes	2
9	Rubio Ñú	2
11	Atl. Colegiales	1
11	Capitán Figari	1
11	Tembetary	1

== All-time goalscorers ==
As of 28 July 2024

Rank	Player	Goals	Years
1	(Paraguay) Santiago Salcedo	166	2001
2	(Paraguay) Oscar Cardozo	130	2004
3	(Argentina) Hernán López	127	2002-2017

== See also ==
- Primera División de Paraguay
- Paraguayan football league system
