= Jaray =

Jaray is a surname. Notable people with the surname include:

- Hans Jaray (1906−1990), Austrian actor, director, and author
- Paul Jaray (1889−1974), Hungarian engineer, designer, and pioneer of automotive streamlining
- Tess Jaray (born 1937), British painter and printmaker

== See also ==
- Jara (surname)
