= Penayo =

Penayo is a surname. Notable people with the surname include:

- Gilberto Penayo (1933–2020), Paraguayan footballer
- Gloria Penayo (born 1962), former First Lady of Paraguay
- Pedro Wilfrido Garay Penayo (born 1982), Paraguayan long-distance runner
