= Francisco Ferreira =

Francisco Ferreira may refer to:

- Francisco Ferreira (Paraguayan footballer) (born 1970), former Paraguayan football striker
- Francisco Ferreira (Portuguese footballer) (1919–1986), Portuguese football midfield
- Francisco Reis Ferreira (born 1997), Portuguese footballer
- Patxi Ferreira (Francisco Ferreira Colmenero, born 1967), retired Spanish footballer
