= Jara Saguier =

Jara Saguier is the last name of several former football (soccer) players from Paraguay. Notable people with the surname include:

- Alberto Jara Saguier
- Ángel Jara Saguier
- Carlos Jara Saguier
- Darío Jara Saguier
- Enrique Jara Saguier

== See also ==
- Jara (surname)
