= Flaminio Silva =

Paraguayan footballer

Flaminio Silva is a former football striker from Paraguay who played for Olimpia Asunción in the 1930s.

Silva was the top goalscorer in a single season in Paraguayan football, after scoring 34 goals in 1936.

== Titles ==
Season	Team	Title
1936	(Paraguay) Olimpia	Paraguayan 1st Division
1937	(Paraguay) Olimpia	Paraguayan 1st Division
1938	(Paraguay) Olimpia	Paraguayan 1st Division

== See also ==
- Players and Records in Paraguayan Football
