= Jara (surname) =

Jara is a Spanish surname, popular in various places in southern Spain, meaning rockrose or cistus.

== People with the surname ==
=== Association football ===
==== Europe ====
- Francisco Chaparro Jara (born 1942), Spanish footballer and manager
- Kurt Jara (born 1950), Austrian footballer
- Santi Jara (born 1991), Spanish footballer

==== North America ====
- Claudio Jara (born 1959), Costa Rican footballer
- Francisco Jara (1941–2024), Mexican footballer
- Geovanny Jara (born 1967), Costa Rican footballer
- Guillermo Jara (born 1973), American football (soccer) player

==== South America ====
- Ángel Jara (1936–2008), Paraguayan footballer
- Cristino Jara (born 1973), Paraguayan footballer
- Diego Jara (born 1983), Argentine footballer
- Franco Jara (born 1988), Argentine footballer
- Gonzalo Jara (born 1985), Chilean footballer
- Gualberto Jara (born 1959), Paraguayan football manager in Chile
- Leonardo Jara (born 1991), Argentine footballer
- Rodrigo Jara (born 1985), Chilean footballer

=== Other ===
- Alan Jara (born 1957), Colombian politician kidnapped by the FARC
- Albino Jara (1877–1912), Paraguayan president
- Cristóbal Magallanes Jara (1869–1927), Mexican Roman Catholic priest and saint
- Fernando Jara (born 1987), Panamanian jockey
- Ginés de la Jara, Spanish Christian saint
- Jeannette Jara (born 1974), Chilean politician
- Joan Jara (1927–2023), Chilean activist
- Juan Antonio Jara (1845–1887), Paraguayan politician
- Luis Jara (singer) (born 1965), Chilean singer and actor
- Max Jara (1886–1965), Chilean poet
- Patricio Jara (born 1974), Chilean writer and journalist
- Víctor Jara (1932–1973), Chilean teacher, theatre director, poet, singer-songwriter, and political activist

== See also ==
- Jara Saguier
