= Nery Franco =

Paraguayan footballer (born 1959)

Felipe Nery Franco
Personal information
- Full name: Nery Franco
- Date of birth: 26 May 1959 (age 67)
- Height: 1.86 m (6 ft 1 in)
- Position: Forward

Senior career*
Years	Team	Apps	(Gls)
- Cerro Porteño
1982–1985	Elche CF		
1985–1986	Cartagena FC		
1986–1988	Unión Magdalena		
1988–1989	Cúcuta Deportivo		
- Olimpia Asunción
- Club Libertad

International career
1993	Paraguay	1	(1)
- * Club domestic league appearances and goals

Felipe Nery Franco (born 26 May 1959) is a Paraguayan former footballer who played as a striker.

During his career, Franco played for teams such as Olimpia Asunción, Club Libertad and Deportivo Humaitá of Paraguay; and for Cúcuta Deportivo and Unión Magdalena of Colombia. While in Olimpia, he won important titles with the club, although he came in as a substitute most of the time. Franco's biggest achievement as a striker came in 1992, when he was the topscorer in the Paraguayan 1st division with 13 goals.
