= Alberto Jara Saguier =

Paraguayan footballer and coach (born 1943)

Personal information
- Full name: Alberto Isidoro Jara Saguier
- Date of birth: 30 September 1943 (age 83)
- Place of birth: Asunción, Paraguay
- Position: Midfielder

Senior career*
| Years | Team | Apps | (Gls) |
| 1961–1966 | Rubio Ñú | | |
| 1966 | Red Star Saint-Ouen | 3 | (0) |
| 1967–1968 | Real Mallorca | | |
| 1969 | Olimpia Asunción | | |
| 1970 | Libertad | | |
| 1971 | River Plate (Asunción) | | |

International career
- Paraguay
- * Club domestic league appearances and goals

Alberto Isidoro Jara Saguier (born 30 September 1943) is a former football midfielder and coach. Alberto is one of the seven Jara Saguier brothers that played professional football in Paraguay.

== Career ==
=== As player ===
Born in Asunción, Paraguay, Jara Saguier started his career in the youth divisions of his hometown club Rubio Ñú and eventually made the first team, helping the club win the second division tournament in 1963. He was then transferred to French club Red Star Saint-Ouen in 1966, and the following year signed for Real Mallorca of Spain before returning to Paraguay to play for Olimpia Asunción (1969), Libertad (1970) and River Plate de Asunción (1971).

At the national team level, Alberto Jara Saguier was part of the Paraguay squad that competed in the qualifiers for the 1966 FIFA World Cup, which Paraguay failed to qualify.

=== As coach ===
Alberto Jara Saguier managed the youth divisions of Olimpia, Cerro Porteño, General Caballero ZC and other small teams in the Ciudad del Este area. He managed the first team of clubs like Sportivo Iteño, Sportivo Isla Pucú, Sportivo Coronel Oviedo, Minga Guazú, Deportivo Boquerón and Club Atletico 3 de Febrero

== Titles ==
=== As player ===
| Season | Team | Title |
|---|---|---|
| 1963 | Rubio Ñú | Paraguayan 2nd division |
