= Enrique Jara Saguier =

Paraguayan footballer (born 1934)

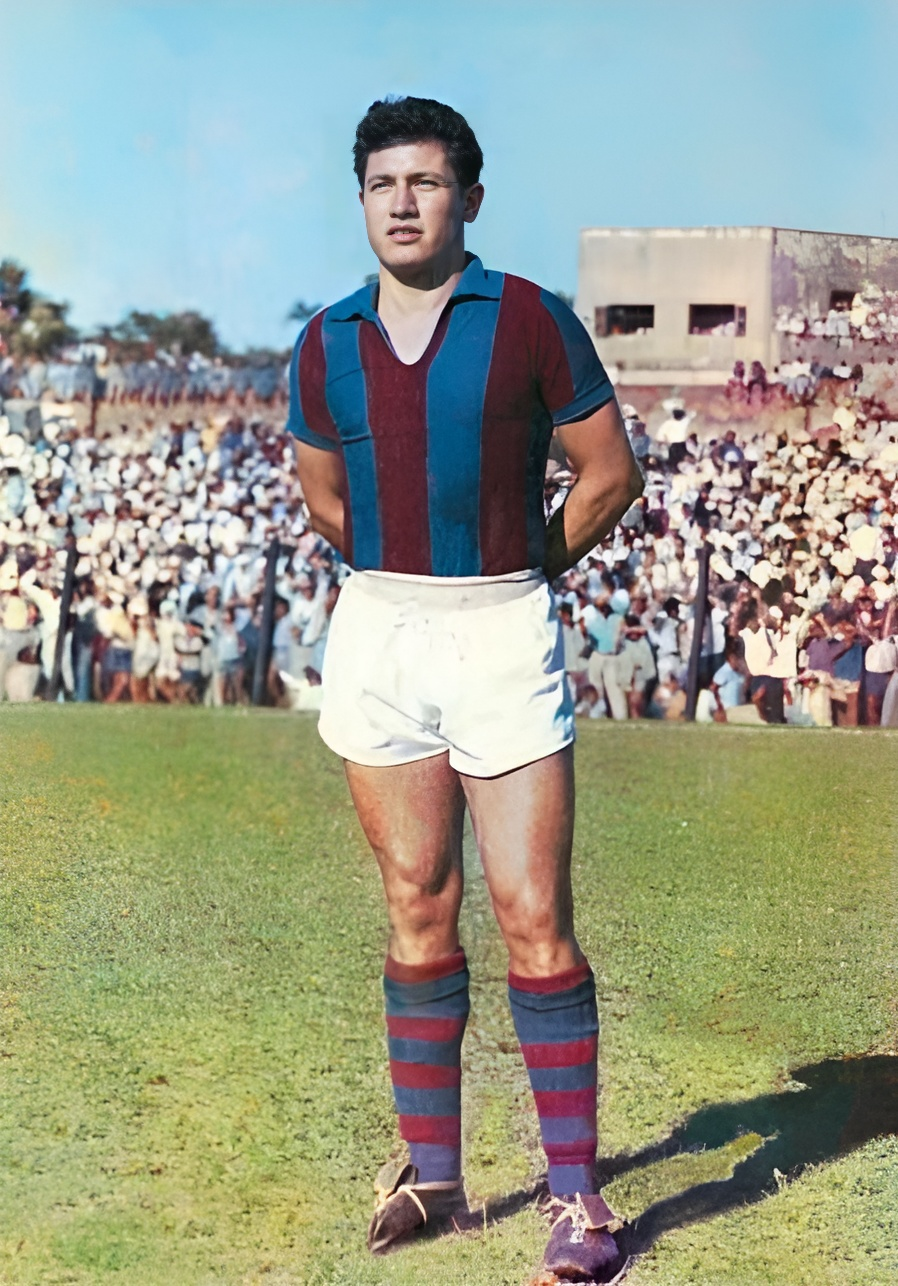

Personal information
- Full name: Enrique Augusto Jara Saguier
- Date of birth: 12 July 1934 (age 92)
- Place of birth: Asunción, Paraguay

Senior career*
Years	Team	Apps	(Gls)
1950–1964	Cerro Porteño	?	(?)

International career
- Paraguay
- * Club domestic league appearances and goals

Enrique Augusto Jara Saguier (born 12 July 1934 in Asunción, Paraguay) is a former football player. Enrique is one of the seven Jara Saguier brothers that played professional football in Paraguay.

== Career ==
Enrique Jara Saguier spent most of his career playing for Cerro Porteño, team in which he made his debut in 1950. At the national team level, Enrique was part of the Paraguay squad that competed in the qualifiers for the 1958 FIFA World Cup, in which Paraguay competed.

== Titles ==
=== As player ===
Season	Team	Title
1950	Cerro Porteño	Paraguayan 1st division
1954	Cerro Porteño	Paraguayan 1st division
1961	Cerro Porteño	Paraguayan 1st division
1963	Cerro Porteño	Paraguayan 1st division
