= Vicente Aguirre =

Argentine footballer

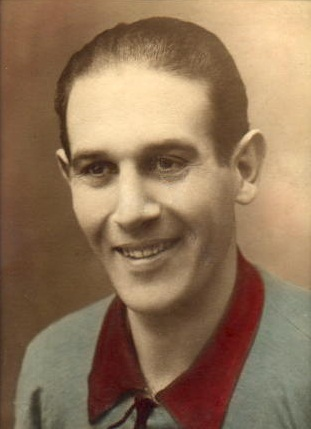
- Vicente "Chueco" Aguirre

Personal information
- Date of birth: 22 January 1901
- Place of birth: Rosario, Argentina
- Date of death: 11 June 1990 (aged 89)
- Place of death: Santa Fe, Argentina
- Position: Striker

Youth career
- 1916: Rosario Central

Senior career*
Years	Team	Apps	(Gls)
1917–1917	Rosario Central	1	(0)
1919–1924	Central Córdoba	?	(?)
1925–1928	Newell's Old Boys	65	(80)
1929–1932	Central Córdoba	?	(?)
Total		?	(?)

International career
1923–1924	Argentina	4	(4)
- * Club domestic league appearances and goals

Vicente Aguirre (January 22, 1901 - June 11, 1990) was an Argentine footballer, prominent in the history of Club Atlético Central Córdoba and Newell's Old Boys, who also made four appearances for the Argentina national team in 1923–24.

== Club career ==
In 1916, when he was fifteen years old, he started playing football in the lower divisions of Rosario Central. First he joined the team of the fourth division and then, in 1917, played in the team which won the third division tournament. In the final match that season, Aguirre scored two goals in the extra time that gave the team a 3:1 victory against Gimnasia y Esgrima.

In 1918, Aguirre transferred to Central Córdoba. He won the Rosarina Football Association championships with Central Córdoba and once in Newell's Old Boys. With the Charrúas he won the 1931 Preparation Tournament and the Governor Luciano Molinas Tournament in 1932, the first 2 official titles in the history of the club.

== International career ==
As a player of the Argentinian team, he made 4 appearances for the national team and scoring four goals, including a hat-trick in Montevideo (Copa América) in 1923, leading Argentina to a 4–3 win over Paraguay. Aguirre appeared in all three games for Argentina, who finished runners-up to Uruguay, at the 1923 Copa América.

=== Clubs ===
Rosario Central

- Copa Nicasio Vila (1): 1917

Newell's Old Boys

- Copa Estímulo de la Asociación Rosarina (1): 1925

Central Córdoba

- Torneo Preparación (1): 1931
- Torneo Gobernador Luciano Molinas (1): 1932

=== Individual ===
- Copa América Top-scorer: 1923 with 3 goals.
