= Enrique Avalos =

Paraguayan footballer (born 1922)

Enrique Ávalos
Personal information
- Full name: Rafael Enrique Ávalos
- Date of birth: 1922
- Place of birth: Paraguay
- Position: Forward

Senior career*
Years	Team	Apps	(Gls)
- Cerro Porteño

International career
- Paraguay
- * Club domestic league appearances and goals

Rafael Enrique Ávalos (born 1922, date of death unknown) was a Paraguayan football forward who played for Paraguay in the 1950 FIFA World Cup. He also played for Cerro Porteño. Avalos is deceased.
