= Óscar Aguilera =

Paraguayan footballer (born 1935)

Personal information
- Full name: Óscar Antonio Aguilera Valdés
- Date of birth: 11 March 1935
- Place of birth: Paraguay
- Date of death: c. 1979 (aged 44)
- Place of death: Seville, Spain
- Position: Forward

Senior career*
Years	Team	Apps	(Gls)
- Club Olimpia

International career
- Paraguay
- * Club domestic league appearances and goals

Óscar Antonio Aguilera Valdés (11 March 1935 – c. 1979) was a Paraguayan football forward who played for Paraguay in the 1958 FIFA World Cup. He also played for Club Olimpia.

Aguilera later moved to Seville, Spain, and had five children. He never returned to his native Paraguay, and died in Seville at the age of 44.
