= Hermes González =

Paraguayan footballer (born 1935)

Personal information
- Full name: Hermes Celestino González Flores
- Date of birth: 6 April 1935 (age 91)
- Place of birth: Asunción, Paraguay
- Position: Midfielder

Senior career*
Years	Team	Apps	(Gls)
1951–1956	Club Libertad		
1956–1959	FC Barcelona	5	(1)
1959–1962	Real Oviedo	37	(11)

International career
1955–1956	Paraguay	11	(0)
- * Club domestic league appearances and goals

Hermes González (born 6 April 1935) is a Paraguayan former footballer. He notably played for FC Barcelona. He was in Paraguay’s squads for the 1955 and 1956 Copa Americas.

== Honours ==
Libertad

- Paraguayan Primera División: 1955

Barcelona

- La Liga: 1958-1959
- Copa del Rey: 1958-1959
- Inter-Cities Fairs Cup: 1955-1958
