= Silvio Parodi (footballer) =

Paraguayan footballer (1931–1989)

Personal information
- Full name: Silvio Parodi Ramos
- Date of birth: 3 November 1931
- Place of birth: Luque, Paraguay
- Date of death: 9 October 1989 (aged 57)
- Position: Forward

Senior career*
Years	Team	Apps	(Gls)
1950–1953	Sportivo Luqueño		
1954–1955	Vasco de Gama		
1956–1957	Fiorentina	8	(2)
1957–1961	Vasco de Gama		
1961–1962	Racing de Santander	13	(3)
1963–1964	Millonarios		

International career
1953–1961	Paraguay	17	(7)

Managerial career
- 1987: Sol de América
- 1987: Paraguay
Medal record
Representing Paraguay
Copa América
Winner	1953 Peru
- * Club domestic league appearances and goals

Silvio Parodi (3 November 1931 – 9 October 1989) was a Paraguayan football player and manager. He was part of Paraguay's squad that won the 1953 South American Championship. He later coached Paraguay during the 1987 Copa América.

== International career ==
Parodi was selected to Paraguay's squad for the 1953 South American Championship. He only played one game in the tournament, the final against Brazil on 1 April. Paraguay defeated Brazil and won the competition, its first Copa America title. It was Parodi's first cap with Paraguay.

He was again in Paraguay's squad for the 1st 1959 South American Championship in Argentina, played four games and scored two goals

Eight months later, he was in Paraguay's squad for the 2nd 1959 South American Championship in Ecuador, playing four games and scoring three goals.

The friendly against Brazil on 29 June 1961 was his 17th and last cap with Paraguay, and he scored his seventh and last goal with the national team.
