= Darío Jara Saguier =

Paraguayan footballer and coach (1930–2023)

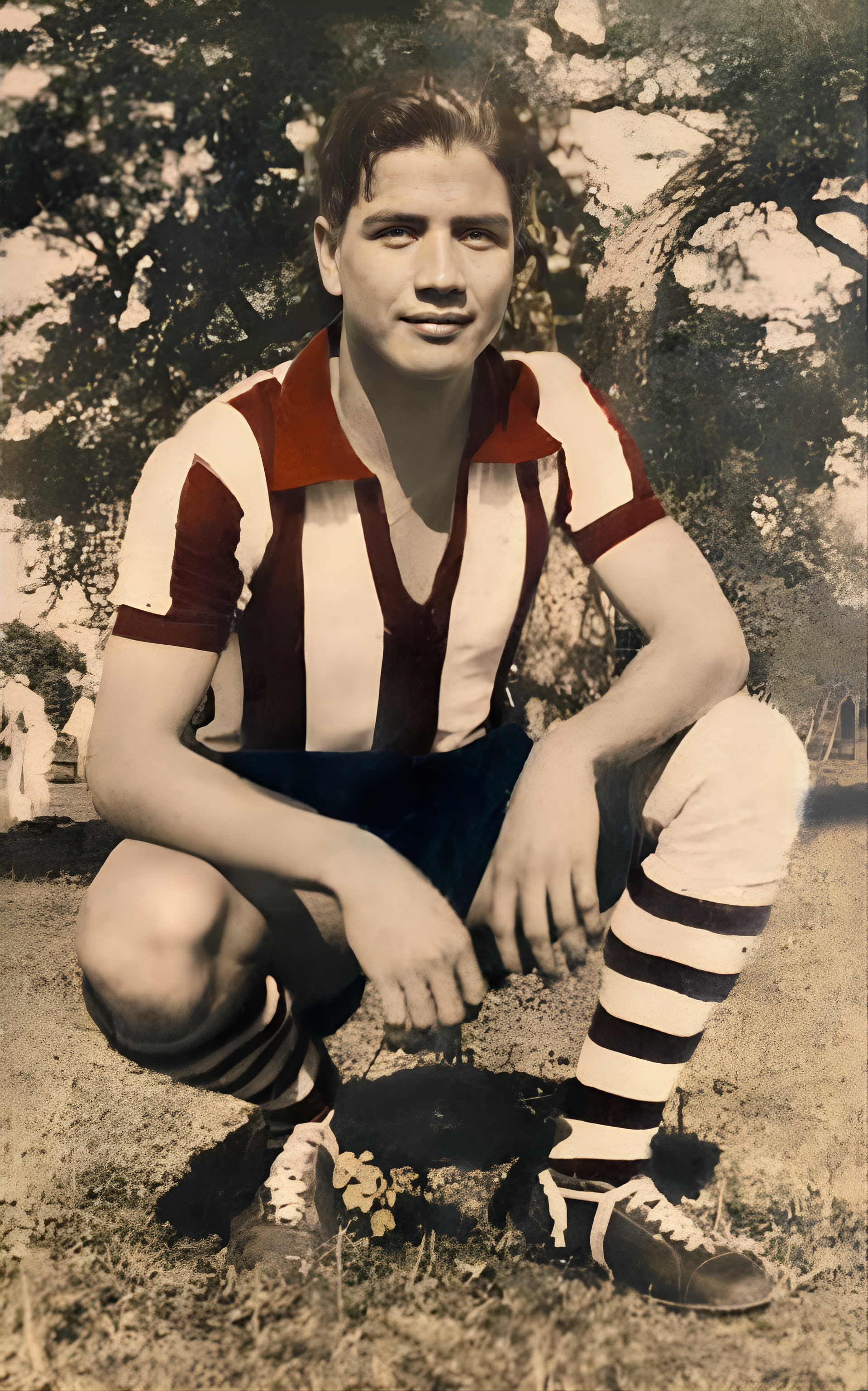

Personal information
- Date of birth: 27 January 1930
- Place of birth: Asunción, Paraguay
- Date of death: 22 January 2023 (aged 92)
- Position: Striker

Senior career*
Years	Team	Apps	(Gls)
1946–1947	Rubio Ñú		
1948–1960	Cerro Porteño		
1961	General Caballero ZC		
1962	Club Rubio Ñú		
1963	Club L.A. de Herrera		
1964	Olimpia de Itá		

International career
1950–1956	Paraguay		
- * Club domestic league appearances and goals

Darío Jara Saguier (27 January 1930 – 22 January 2023) was a Paraguayan football player and coach who played as a striker. Dario is one of the seven Jara Saguier brothers that played professional football in Paraguay.

== Career ==
=== As player ===
Jara Saguier started his career in his hometown club Club Rubio Ñú in 1946 before moving to Cerro Porteño where he spent most of his career and became a key player. He was the 1st division topscorer two consecutive seasons (1949 and 1950), scoring 18 goals on each season. In 1960, after a long career with Cerro Porteño, Saguier went on to play for several Paraguayan clubs such as General Caballero ZC, Rubio Ñú, Luis Alberto de Herrera (Guarambaré) and Olimpia de Itá before retiring in 1965.

At the national team level, Darío Jara Saguier was part of the Paraguay squad that competed in the 1950 FIFA World Cup in Brazil.

=== As coach ===
Darío Jara Saguier started his coaching career while playing for Olimpia de Itá, where he had the role of player-manager. Along the years he coached teams like Sportivo Trinidense, Rubio Ñu, Resistencia S.C., Deportivo Recoleta, Pdte. Hayes, Club Cerro Corá, Sportivo Ameliano, Cerro Porteño, Luis Alberto de Herrera de Guarambaré, and Olimpia de Ita.

== Honours ==
Cerro Porteño

- Paraguayan Primera División: 1950, 1954
