= Amadeo Ortega =

Paraguayan footballer (born 1983)

Personal information
- Place of birth: Paraguay
- Date of death: 17 October 1983
- Position: Forward

Senior career*
Years	Team	Apps	(Gls)
- Club River Plate
1932-1933	Atlanta		
1934	Atlanta-Argentinos Juniors	13	(14)
1935	Atlanta		

International career
- Paraguay
- * Club domestic league appearances and goals

Amadeo Ortega (date of birth unknown, died 17 October 1983) was a Paraguayan football forward who played for Paraguay in the 1930 FIFA World Cup. He also played for Club River Plate.
