= 1923 South American Championship =

Football tournament

Tournament details
- Host country: Uruguay
- Dates: 29 October – 2 December
- Teams: 4 (from 1 confederation)
- Venue: 1 (in 1 host city)

Final positions
- Champions: Uruguay (4th title)
- Runners-up: Argentina
- Third place: Paraguay
- Fourth place: Brazil

Tournament statistics
- Matches played: 6
- Goals scored: 18 (3 per match)
- Top scorer(s): (Argentina) Vicente Aguirre (Uruguay) Pedro Petrone (3 goals each)

The seventh edition of the South American Championship was held in Montevideo, Uruguay from 29 October to 2 December 1923.

== Overview ==
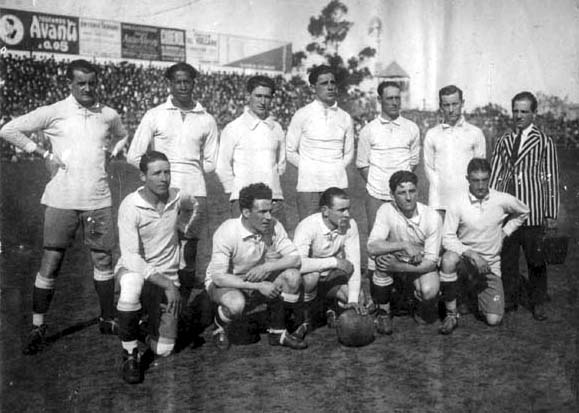
The Uruguayan squad won its 4th. title

The participating countries were Argentina, Brazil, Paraguay and Uruguay. Chile withdrew for the second time since the tournament was created.

The tournament was also used as a qualifier for the 1924 Summer Olympics.

== Squads ==
For a complete list of participants squads see: 1923 South American Championship squads

== Venues ==
Montevideo
Estadio Gran Parque Central
Capacity: 20,000
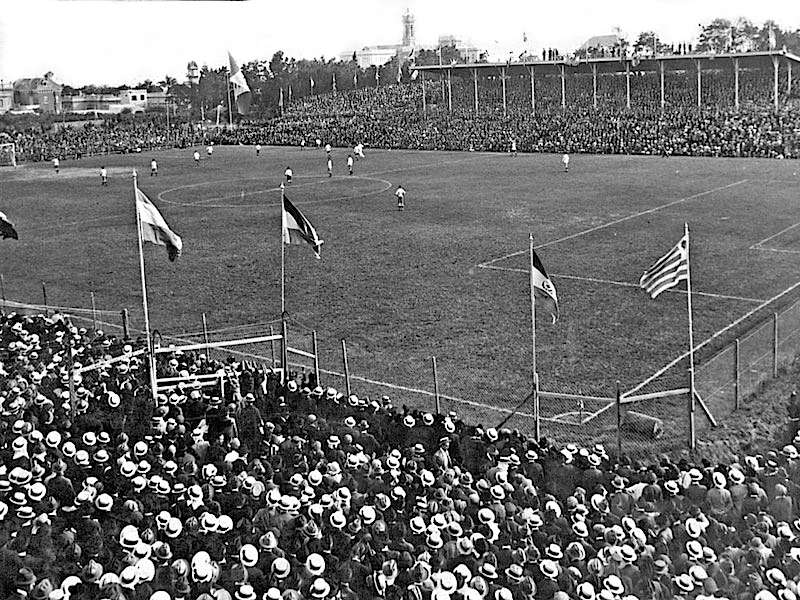

== Final round ==
Each team played one match against each of the other teams. Two points were awarded for a win, one point for a draw and zero points for a defeat.

Team	Pld	W	D	L	GF	GA	GD	Pts
Uruguay	3	3	0	0	6	1	+5	6
Argentina	3	2	0	1	6	6	0	4
Paraguay	3	1	0	2	4	6	−2	2
Brazil	3	0	0	3	2	5	−3	0

29 October 1923

Argentina	4–3	Paraguay
Saruppo 18'; Aguirre 58', 77', 86'		Rivas 10'; Zelada 49'; Fretes 65'

Parque Central, Montevideo
Referee: Angel Minoli (Uruguay)

4 November 1923

Uruguay	2–0	Paraguay
Scarone 11'; Petrone 87'

Parque Central, Montevideo
Referee: Servando Pérez (Argentina)

11 November 1923

Brazil	0–1	Paraguay
		I. López 56'

Parque Central, Montevideo
Referee: Servando Pérez (Argentina)

18 November 1923

Argentina	2–1	Brazil
Onzari 11'; Saruppo 76'		Nilo 15'

Parque Central, Montevideo
Referee: Miguel Barba (Paraguay)

25 November 1923

Uruguay	2–1	Brazil
Petrone 56'; Cea 75'		Nilo 59'

Parque Central, Montevideo
Referee: Servando Pérez (Argentina)

2 December 1923

Uruguay	2–0	Argentina
Petrone 28'; Somma 88'

Parque Central, Montevideo
Referee: Antônio Carneiro de Campos (Brazil)

== Result ==
1923 South American Championship champions

Uruguay
Fourth title

== Goal scorers ==
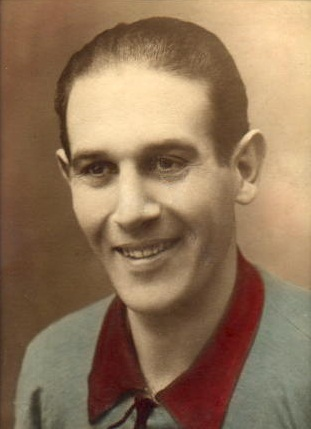
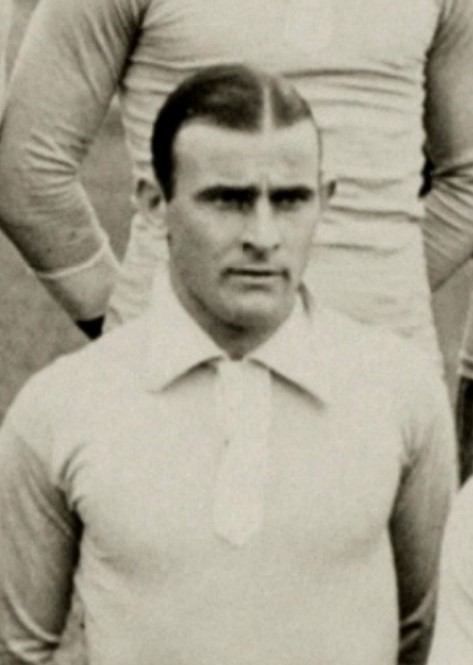
Vicente Aguirre (left) and Pedro Petrone, top scorers

3 goals

- (Argentina) Vicente Aguirre
- (Uruguay) Pedro Petrone

2 goals

- (Argentina) Blas Saruppo
- (Brazil) Nilo

1 goals

- (Argentina) Cesáreo Onzari
- (Paraguay) Luis Fretes
- (Paraguay) Ildefonso López
- (Paraguay) Gerardo Rivas
- (Paraguay) Agustín Zelada
- (Uruguay) José Cea
- (Uruguay) Héctor Scarone
- (Uruguay) Pascual Somma
