= Francisco Ferreira (footballer, born 1970) =

Paraguayan footballer

Personal information
- Full name: Francisco Flaminio Ferreira Romero
- Date of birth: 17 September 1970 (age 56)
- Place of birth: Atyra, Paraguay
- Height: 1.83 m (6 ft 0 in)
- Position: Striker

Senior career*
| Years | Team | Apps | (Gls) |
| 1991–1993 | Sportivo Luqueño | 45 | (22) |
| 1994–1995 | Olimpia | 0 | (0) |
| 1995–1998 | Sol de América | 17 | (11) |
| 1998–1999 | Millonarios | 30 | (8) |
| 1999 | Deportes La Serena | 29 | (15) |
| 2000 | Cerro Porteño | 29 | (23) |
| 2001 | Pachuca | 14 | (0) |
| 2001 | Sportivo Luqueño | 15 | (10) |
| 2002 | Cerro Porteño | 7 | (3) |
| 2002 | Sportivo Luqueño | 19 | (2) |
| 2003 | Oriente Petrolero | 18 | (13) |
| 2004 | The Strongest | 8 | (4) |
| 2005 | Deportivo Quevedo | 7 | (2) |
| 2005 | Universidad César Vallejo | 12 | (2) |
| 2006 | Deportivo Azogues | 3 | (0) |
| Total | | 253 | (115) |

International career
| 1992 | Paraguay U23 | | |
| 1996–2000 | Paraguay | 1 | (0) |
- * Club domestic league appearances and goals

Francisco Flaminio Ferreira Romero (born 17 September 1970), commonly known as Francisco Ferreira, is a former Paraguayan football striker.

Ferreira started his career in Sportivo Luqueño, where at a very young age became one of the team's most prolific strikers leading the Paraguayan League in goalscoring in 1993. His excellent form in 1993 caught the attention of Club Olimpia, who signed Ferreira for the 1994 season. He would then play for teams in Colombia, Chile, Peru, Bolivia and Ecuador, as well as returning to Paraguay to play for Sportivo Luqueño and Cerro Porteño. In 2000, he was the league's topscorer again, with 23 goals.

At the national team level, Ferreira was part of the Paraguay squad during the 1992 Olympic Games and was capped for a few other occasions until 2000.
