= Juan Bautista Villalba =

Paraguayan footballer (1924-2003)

Juan Villalba
Personal information
- Full name: Juan Bautista Villalba Maldonado
- Date of birth: 29 August 1924
- Place of birth: Luque, Paraguay
- Date of death: 18 April 2003 (aged 78)
- Position: Striker

Senior career*
Years	Team	Apps	(Gls)
1940–1941	Gral. Aquino	?	(?)
1941–1947	Sportivo Luqueño	?	(?)
1947–1948	CA Huracán	?	(?)
1948–1950	Boca Juniors (Cali)	?	(?)
1953–1954	Olimpia	?	(?)

International career
1945–1947	Paraguay	14	(10)
- * Club domestic league appearances and goals

Juan Bautista Villalba Maldonado (29 August 1924 in Luque – 18 April 2003) was a Paraguayan footballer who played as a striker.

Villalba was a striker, known for his great scoring ability and speed. He played for the Paraguay national football team between 1945 and 1947, scoring ten goals. Villalba had to retire early from football at the age of 30 due to injuries.
