= Rubén Barrios =

Paraguayan footballer

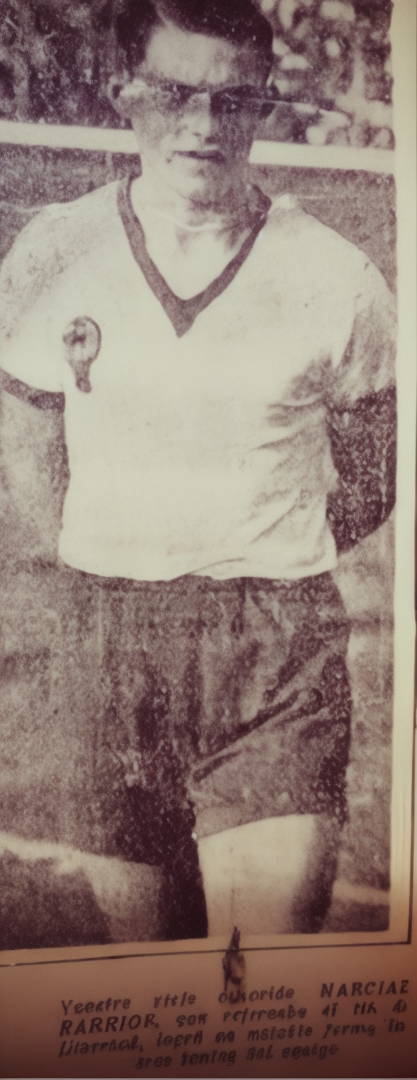

Personal information
- Full name: Rubén Marcial Barrios González
- Date of birth: 26 June 1919
- Place of birth: Lambaré, Paraguay
- Date of death: Unknown
- Position: Inside forward

Senior career*
Years	Team	Apps	(Gls)
1937–1938	Olimpia		
1939	Huracán	2	(1)
1939–1941	Unión Santa Fe		
1942–1943	Boca Juniors	22	(10)
1944	Fluminense	1	(0)
1944–1947	São Paulo	98	(40)
1948	Olimpia		
1949–1950	Cerro Porteño		

International career
1937–1949	Paraguay		(8)

Managerial career
- 1974: Paraguay (caretaker)
- * Club domestic league appearances and goals as of 16 August 2025

Rubén Marcial Barrios González (26 June 1919 – ?) was a Paraguayan professional footballer who played as a forward.

== Club career ==
Having started his career at Olimpia, Barrios stood out in particular for his good performances in the 1939 South American Championship. He was signed by Huracán, where he played for just two matches in April 1939, later moving to Unión Santa Fé.

In 1942 he arrived at Boca Juniors where he made 22 appearances and scored 10 goals over two years, becoming national champion in 1943. He later played for Fluminense but only played a single match with the team, moving to São Paulo where he made 98 appearances, scoring 40 goals and becoming state champion in 1945 and 1946. He returned to Paraguayan football with Olimpia in 1948 and later played for Cerro Porteño.

== International career ==
Barrios participated in four editions of the South American Championship: 1937, 1939, 1942 and 1949, scoring 3 goals in 1939, another 3 goals in 1942, and 2 goals in 1949.

He also had a brief experience as a coach for Paraguay in two friendly matches, alongside Aurelio González, against Brazil and Chile, teams that were in preparation for the 1974 FIFA World Cup.

== Honours ==
Olimpia

- Paraguayan Primera División: 1938, 1948

Boca Juniors

- Argentine Primera División: 1943

São Paulo

- Campeonato Paulista: 1945, 1946
