= Gilberto Penayo =

Paraguayan footballer (1933–2020)

Personal information
- Full name: Benigno Gilberto Penayo Ortiz
- Date of birth: 3 April 1933
- Place of birth: Asunción, Paraguay
- Date of death: 27 October 2020 (aged 87)
- Position: Striker

Senior career*
Years	Team	Apps	(Gls)
1951–1958	Sol de América	?	(?)
1958–1964	Cerro Porteño	?	(?)
1964–1965	Silvio Pettirossi	?	(?)

International career
1958-1961	Paraguay	10	(0)
- * Club domestic league appearances and goals

Benigno Gilberto Penayo Ortiz (3 April 1933 – 27 October 2020) was a Paraguayan football striker.

== Career ==
Penayo was born in Asunción. He started playing in his school's football team and decided to attend a tryout by Club Libertad where he was turned down. Despite that, Penayo kept trying and was eventually signed by Club Sol de América. He made his debut with the club in 1951 and remained there until 1958 before moving to Cerro Porteño, where he won two national championships and was the 1st division topscorer in 1960 with 18 goals. In 1964 he signed for Club Silvio Pettirossi, his final club before retiring from football in 1965.

Penayo played for the Paraguay national football team in several occasions, most notably in the 1958 FIFA World Cup.

== Titles ==
Season	Team	Title
1961	Cerro Porteño	Paraguayan 1st division
1963	Cerro Porteño	Paraguayan 1st division
