= Ildefonso López =

Paraguayan footballer

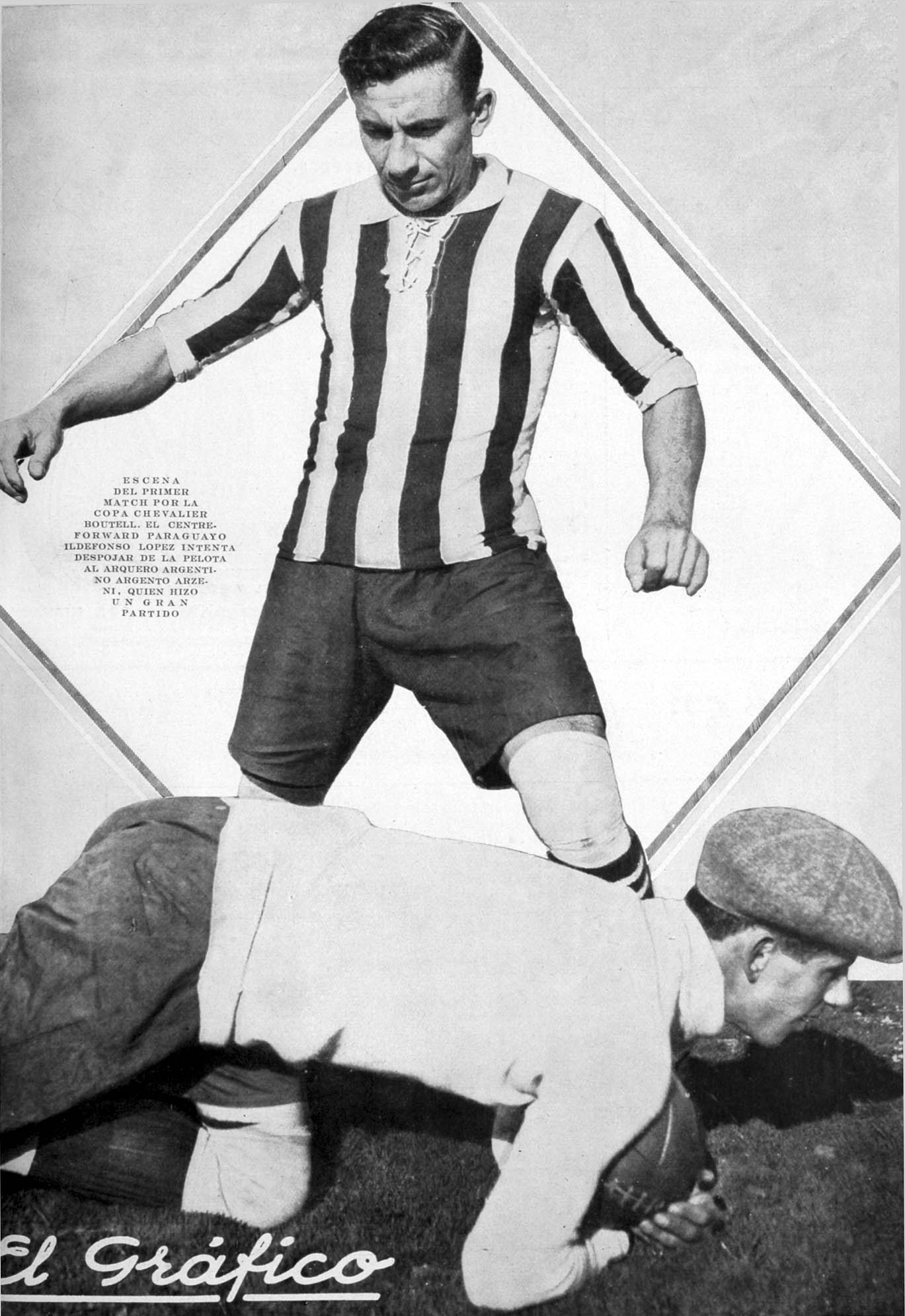
- Ildefonso López (Paraguay) and Argento Arzeni (Argentina)

Personal information
- Position: Forward

Senior career*
Years	Team	Apps	(Gls)
19??–??	Club Guaraní		

International career
1921–1926	Paraguay	30	(8)
Medal record
Men's football
Silver medal – second place	Brazil 1922	{{{2}}}
Bronze medal – third place	Uruguay 1923	{{{2}}}
Bronze medal – third place	Uruguay 1924	{{{2}}}
- * Club domestic league appearances and goals

Ildefonso López was a Paraguayan footballer who played as a forward.

As a player for Club Guaraní, López took part in the 1921 South American Championship, where Paraguay finished fourth and last. He played in all three matches, against Uruguay (scoring one goal), Brazil and Argentina.

A year later, he competed in the 1922 South American Championship, where Paraguay finished as runners-up. López played in four matches, against Brazil, Chile (scoring one goal), Argentina and the championship play-off against Brazil.

Still representing Club Guaraní, he took part in the 1923 South American Championship, where Paraguay finished third. López played in all three matches, against Argentina, Uruguay and Brazil, scoring the winning goal against Brazil.

He made his fourth consecutive appearance at the continental championship in the 1924 South American Championship, where Paraguay again finished third. López played in two matches, against Argentina and Chile, scoring two goals. His tally of two goals was enough for him to finish as one of the tournament's joint second-highest scorers.

López made his fifth and final appearance in the continental championship at the 1926 South American Championship, where Paraguay finished fourth. He played in two matches, against Bolivia (scoring one goal) and Chile.

With Club Guaraní, López won the Paraguayan Primera División championship twice, in 1921 and 1923.
