= Ángel Jara Saguier =

Paraguayan footballer (1936–2008)

Ángel Jara
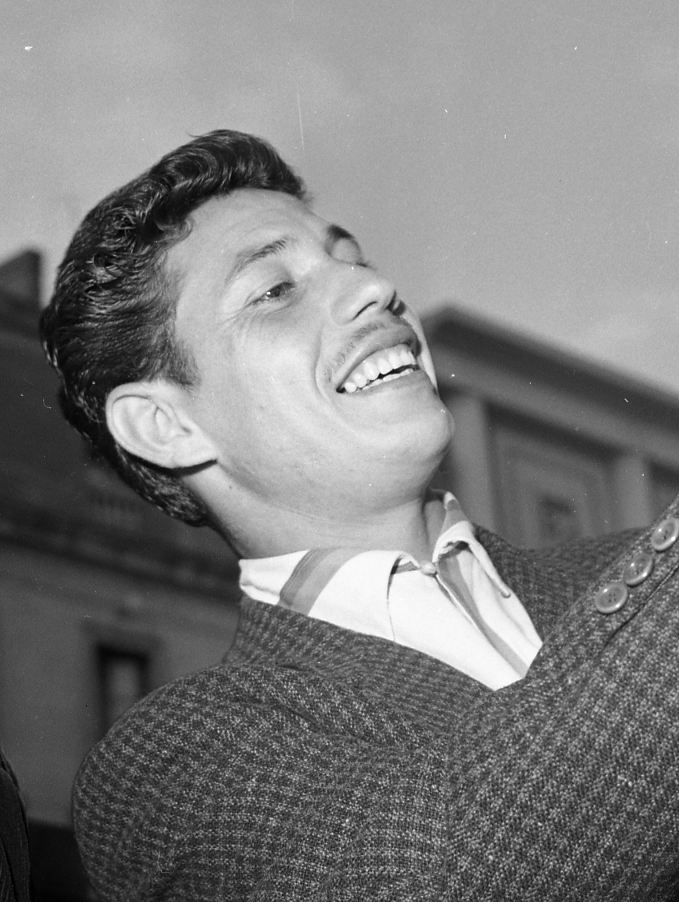
- Jara in 1962

Personal information
- Full name: Ángel Críspulo Jara Saguier
- Date of birth: 1 October 1936
- Place of birth: Asunción, Paraguay
- Date of death: 15 September 2008 (aged 71)
- Position: Midfielder

Senior career*
Years	Team	Apps	(Gls)
1953–1962	Cerro Porteño		
1962–1965	Toulouse	24	(2)
1965–1967	Red Star	60	(5)
1967–1969	RC Besançon	64	(2)

International career
- Paraguay
- * Club domestic league appearances and goals

Ángel Críspulo Jara Saguier (Asunción, 1 October 1936 — 15 September 2008) was a Paraguayan footballer. Ángel is one of the seven Jara Saguier brothers that played professional football in Paraguay.

He played for Cerro Porteño, before joining France, where he played for Toulouse (Ligue 1), Red Star (Ligue 1 and Ligue 2) and RC Besançon (Ligue 2).

== External links and references ==
- Biography
- Barreaud, Marc (1998). Dictionnaire des footballeurs étrangers du championnat professionnel français (1932–1997). L'Harmattan, Paris. ISBN 2-7384-6608-7.
