= Luis Fretes =

Paraguayan footballer

Personal information
- Date of birth: unknown
- Position: Forward

Senior career*
Years	Team	Apps	(Gls)
- Guaraní

International career
1922–1929	Paraguay	28	(7)
- * Club domestic league appearances and goals

Luis Fretes was a Paraguayan footballer who played as a forward.

As a player for Club Guaraní, he participated in the 1922 South American Championship, in which the Paraguay national team finished as runners-up in South America. Fretes played in three matches, against Chile, in which he scored a goal, Uruguay, and Brazil in the championship play-off.

The following year, he participated in the 1923 South American Championship, where Paraguay finished in third place. Fretes played in all three matches, against Argentina, in which he scored a goal, Uruguay and Brazil.

In 1923, Fretes won the Paraguayan championship with Guaraní.

He subsequently participated in the 1924 South American Championship, where Paraguay again finished in third place. Fretes played in all three matches, against Argentina, Uruguay and Chile.

Fretes made his fourth appearance in the continental championship at the 1925 South American Championship, where Paraguay finished in last place among the three participating teams. He played in all four matches, appearing in both matches against Argentina and both matches against Brazil. He scored a goal in the second match against Brazil.

The 1926 South American Championship was his fifth continental championship. Paraguay finished fourth, and Fretes played in three matches, against Argentina, Bolivia and Uruguay.

He made his sixth and final appearance in the continental championship at the 1929 South American Championship, where Paraguay finished as runners-up. Fretes played only in the match against Peru.

Fretes also participated in the 1924, 1925 and 1926 Copa Chevallier Boutell tournaments. Between 1922 and 1929, he made 28 appearances for Paraguay and scored seven goals.

== Bibliography ==
- Tomasz Wołek, Encyklopedia piłkarska FUJI. Copa America, Wydawnictwo GiA, Katowice, 1995, ISBN 83-902751-2-0, pp. 25, 28, 37, 39, 41, 46.
