= Francisco Sosa =

Paraguayan footballer

- Sosa in Rosario Central

Personal information
- Place of birth: Paraguay
- Position: Forward

Senior career*
Years	Team	Apps	(Gls)
1939-1940	Rosario Central	10	(6)
1950	Cerro Porteño		

International career
- Paraguay
- * Club domestic league appearances and goals

Francisco Sosa was a Paraguayan football forward who played for Paraguay in the 1950 FIFA World Cup. He also played for Cerro Porteño. Sosa is deceased.
