= Agustín Zelada =

Paraguayan footballer

Personal information
- Position: Forward

International career
Years	Team	Apps	(Gls)
1921–1924	Paraguay		

Agustín Zelada was a Paraguayan association football player who played as a forward. He represented the Paraguay national football team during the early 1920s and took part in the 1921 South American Championship and the 1923 South American Championship.

== International career ==
Zelada was part of the Paraguay squad that competed at the 1921 South American Championship, the country's first appearance in the competition. He played in Paraguay's opening match against Uruguay on 9 October 1921, when Paraguay won 2–1. The match was Paraguay's first game in the South American Championship. Gerardo Rivas and Ildefonso López scored Paraguay's goals, while Zelada started in the forward line.

Later that year, Zelada appeared in a friendly against Uruguay in Montevideo on 2 November 1921. Paraguay lost 4–2, with Zelada scoring one of the Paraguayan goals.

Zelada returned to the national team for the 1923 South American Championship in Uruguay. Paraguay finished third, behind Uruguay and Argentina. Zelada appeared against Argentina, Uruguay and Brazil, and scored in the 4–3 defeat to Argentina on 29 October 1923. He therefore finished the tournament with one goal.

Zelada also played in Paraguay's 1–0 victory over Brazil on 11 November 1923.

Available international records indicate that Zelada remained involved with the national team into 1924, including an appearance against Argentina on 15 May 1924. He also took part in the first match of the Copa Chevallier Boutell in 1924.

== Bibliography ==
- Tomasz Wołek, Encyklopedia piłkarska FUJI. Copa America, Wydawnictwo GiA, Katowice, 1995, ISBN 83-902751-2-0, pp. 22, 28.
