= Máximo Rolón =

Paraguayan footballer (born 1934)

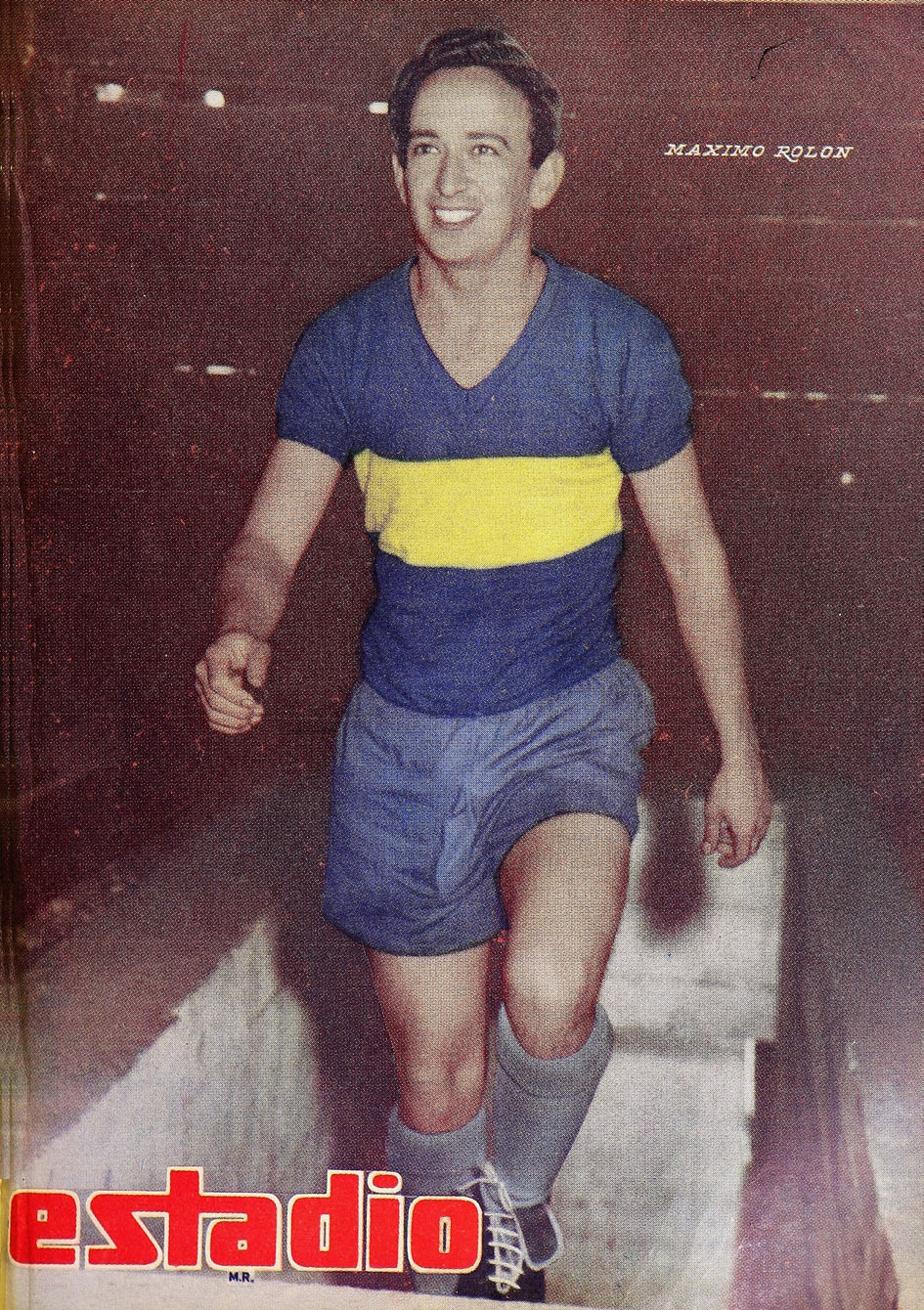

Personal information
- Full name: Máximo Rolón Villa
- Date of birth: 18 November 1934 (age 91)
- Place of birth: Asunción, Paraguay
- Position: Striker

Youth career
- Libertad

Senior career*
Years	Team	Apps	(Gls)
1954–1956	Libertad		(72)
1957–1959	Everton		
1960	San Luis		
1961	América de Cali		
1962	Santiago Wanderers		
1963	Valparaíso Ferroviarios		

International career
1955–1956	Paraguay	13	(9)
- * Club domestic league appearances and goals

Máximo Rolón Villa (born November 18, 1934, in Asunción, Paraguay) is a former Paraguayan footballer who played for clubs in Paraguay, Chile and Colombia. He was in Paraguay’s squads for the 1955 and 1956 Copa Américas.

== Teams ==
- (Paraguay) Libertad 1954-1956
- (Chile) Everton 1957-1959
- (Chile) San Luis de Quillota 1960
- (Colombia) América de Cali 1961
- (Chile) Santiago Wanderers 1962
- (Chile) Valparaíso Ferroviarios 1963

== Titles ==
- (Paraguay) Libertad 1955 (Paraguayan Primera División Championship)

== Honours ==
- (Paraguay) Libertad 1954, 1955 and 1956 (Top Scorer Paraguayan Primera División Championship)
- Everton 1958 (Top Scorer Copa Chile)
