= 1921 South American Championship squads =

List of footballers

These are the squads for the countries that played in the 1921 South American Championship. The participating countries were Argentina, Brazil, Paraguay and Uruguay. The teams plays in a single round-robin tournament, earning two points for a win, one point for a draw, and zero points for a loss.

== Argentina ==
Head Coach: n/i (Note: The first appointed coach of the Argentina national team was Ángel Vásquez in 1924.)

No.	Pos.	Player	Date of birth (age)	Caps	Goals	Club
—	DF	Florindo Bearzotti		5	0	(Argentine Football Association) Belgrano (Rosario)
—	FW	Pedro Calomino	13 March 1892 (aged 29)	30	4	(Argentine Football Association) Boca Juniors
—	DF	Adolfo Celli	31 December 1896 (aged 24)	3	0	(Argentine Football Association) Newell's Old Boys
—	FW	Jaime Chavín	25 July 1899 (aged 22)	3	1	(Argentine Football Association) Huracán
—	MF	Miguel Dellavalle	1 December 1898 (aged 22)	3	1	(Argentine Football Association) Belgrano (C)
—	FW	Raúl Echeverría		4	2	(Argentine Football Association) Estudiantes (LP)
—	MF	Alfredo Elli		0	0	(Argentine Football Association) Boca Juniors
—	FW	Vicente González	1 January 1901 (aged 20)	0	0	(Argentine Football Association) Gimnasia y Esgrima (Mza)
—	FW	Julio Libonatti	5 July 1901 (aged 20)	8	5	(Argentine Football Association) Newell's Old Boys
—	MF	José Alfredo López	24 January 1897 (aged 24)	7	0	(Argentine Football Association) Boca Juniors
—	GK	Ernesto Kiessel		1	0	(Argentine Football Association) Huracán
—	DF	Juan Presta		3	0	(Argentine Football Association) Porteño
—	FW	Blas Saruppo	25 July 1895 (aged 26)	0	0	(Argentine Football Association) Newell's Old Boys
—	MF	Emilio Solari	4 January 1900 (aged 21)	0	0	(Argentine Football Association) Nueva Chicago
—	MF	Gabino Sosa	4 October 1899 (aged 21)	0	0	(Argentine Football Association) Central Córdoba (R)
—	GK	Américo Tesoriere	18 March 1899 (aged 22)	8	0	(Argentine Football Association) Boca Juniors

== Brazil ==
Head coach: (Brazil) Ferreira Vianna Netto

No.	Pos.	Player	Date of birth (age)	Caps	Goals	Club
—	FW	Alfredinho	5 May 1896 (aged 25)	0	0	(Brazilian Football Confederation) Botafogo
—	DF	Barata	29 December 1899 (aged 21)	0	0	(Brazilian Football Confederation) America-RJ
—	FW	Candiota	14 June 1900 (aged 21)	0	0	(Brazilian Football Confederation) Flamengo
—	DF	Caratório		0	0	(Brazilian Football Confederation) Andarahy
—	GK	Carnaval		0	0	(Brazilian Football Confederation) São Cristóvão
—	MF	Dino	21 September 1901 (aged 20)	0	0	(Brazilian Football Confederation) Flamengo
—	FW	Fréderico	17 April 1901 (aged 20)	0	0	(Brazilian Football Confederation) Bangu
—	GK	Kuntz	3 September 1897 (aged 24)	4	0	(Brazilian Football Confederation) Flamengo
—	MF	Laís	11 November 1899 (aged 21)	1	0	(Brazilian Football Confederation) Fluminense
—	FW	Machado	30 September 1900 (aged 21)	0	0	(Brazilian Football Confederation) Fluminense
—	MF	Maxambomba	21 December 1897 (aged 23)	0	0	(Brazilian Football Confederation) Coritiba
—	FW	Nonô	1 January 1899 (aged 22)	0	0	(Brazilian Football Confederation) Flamengo
—	FW	Orlandinho	30 November 1899 (aged 21)	0	0	(Brazilian Football Confederation) Flamengo
—	FW	Paulo Vianna		0	0	(Brazilian Football Confederation) Fluminense
—	MF	Pena		0	0	(Brazilian Football Confederation) Coritiba
—	FW	Suíço	13 February 1899 (aged 22)	0	0	(Brazilian Football Confederation) Paysandu
—	DF	Telefone	21 July 1901 (aged 20)	2	0	(Brazilian Football Confederation) Flamengo
—	FW	Zezé	2 May 1899 (aged 22)	3	0	(Brazilian Football Confederation) Fluminense

Player Suíço, although called up, could not travel to Argentina.

== Paraguay ==
Head Coach: (Argentina) José Durand Laguna

No.	Pos.	Player	Date of birth (age)	Caps	Goals	Club
—	MF	Isidoro Benítez Casco		0	0	(Paraguayan Football Association) Libertad
—	MF	Alejandro Delgado		0	0	(Paraguayan Football Association)
—	MF	Manuel Fleitas Solich	30 December 1900 (aged 20)	0	0	(Paraguayan Football Association) Nacional
—	DF	Ramón González		0	0	(Paraguayan Football Association)
—	FW	Darío Lima		0	0	(Paraguayan Football Association)
—	FW	Ildefonso López		0	0	(Paraguayan Football Association) Guaraní
—	DF	Venancio Paredes		0	0	(Paraguayan Football Association) Guaraní
—	GK	Ángel Portaluppi	14 April 1898 (aged 23)	0	0	(Paraguayan Football Association) Libertad
—	GK	Manuel Radice		0	0	(Paraguayan Football Association)
—	FW	Gerardo Rivas		0	0	(Paraguayan Football Association) Libertad
—	MF	Arsenio Rodríguez		0	0	(Paraguayan Football Association)
—	FW	Daniel Schaerer		0	0	(Paraguayan Football Association)
—	FW	Francisco Vera		0	0	(Paraguayan Football Association)
—	FW	Agustín Zelada		0	0	(Paraguayan Football Association)

== Uruguay ==
Head Coach: (Uruguay) Ernesto Fígoli

No.	Pos.	Player	Date of birth (age)	Caps	Goals	Club
—	GK	Manuel Beloutas		1	0	(Uruguayan Football Association) Universal
—	DF	José Pedro Benincasa	16 June 1891 (aged 30)	34	0	(Uruguayan Football Association) Peñarol
—	MF	Oscar Bianchi		0	0	(Uruguayan Football Association) Charley
—	MF	Fausto Broncini		0	0	(Uruguayan Football Association) Central Español
—	FW	Antonio Cámpolo	7 February 1897 (aged 24)	9	1	(Uruguayan Football Association) Peñarol
—	FW	Norberto Casanello		0	0	(Uruguayan Football Association) Montevideo Wanderers
—	GK	Pedro Casella	31 October 1898 (aged 22)	0	0	(Uruguayan Football Association) Belgrano
—	DF	Alfredo Foglino	1 February 1893 (aged 28)	42	0	(Uruguayan Football Association) Nacional
—	DF	Marcelo Lietti		0	0	(Uruguayan Football Association) Universal
—	MF	Sebastián Marroche		0	0	(Uruguayan Football Association) Nacional
—	DF	Juan Molinari		0	0	(Uruguayan Football Association) Universal
—	FW	Ladislao Pérez		0	0	(Uruguayan Football Association) Universal
—	FW	José Piendibene	5 June 1890 (aged 31)	39	19	(Uruguayan Football Association) Peñarol
—	FW	Ángel Romano	2 August 1893 (aged 28)	46	17	(Uruguayan Football Association) Nacional
—	DF	Esteban Ruibal		0	0	(Uruguayan Football Association) Central Español
—	FW	Pascual Somma	2 February 1899 (aged 22)	20	2	(Uruguayan Football Association) Nacional
—	MF	Luis Villazú		0	0	(Uruguayan Football Association) Lito
—	MF	Alfredo Zibecchi	30 October 1895 (aged 25)	20	0	(Uruguayan Football Association) Nacional
