= 1922 South American Championship play-off =

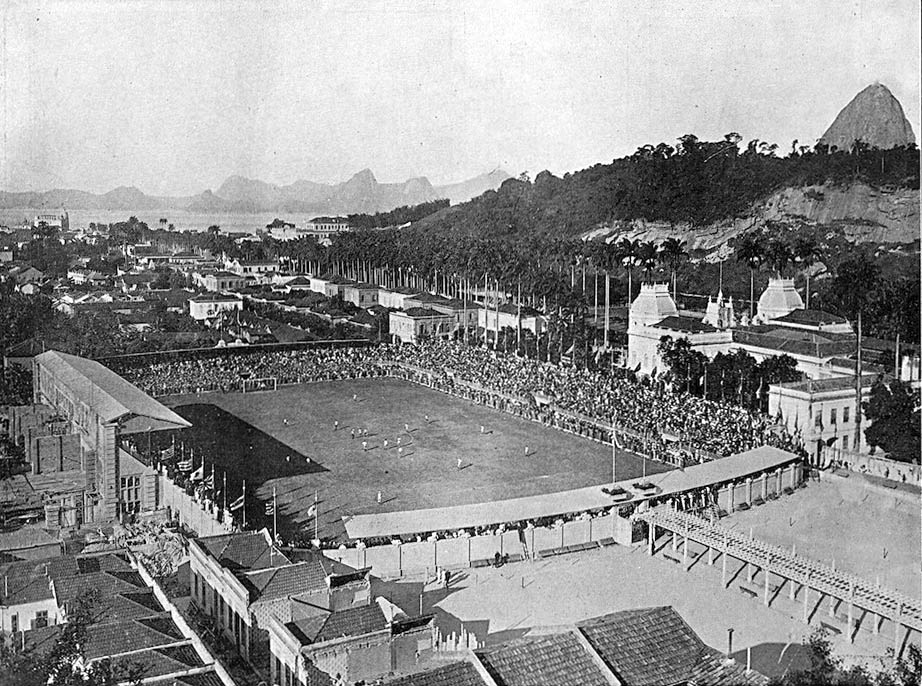
- Estádio das Laranjeiras, venue of the match
- Event: 1922 South American Championship
Brazil	Paraguay
3	0
- Date: November 6, 1922
- Venue: Estádio das Laranjeiras, Rio de Janeiro
- Referee: Servando Pérez (Argentina)
- Attendance: 20,000

The 1922 South American Championship play-off was a match held between Brazil and Paraguay to determine the winner of the 1922 South American Championship, the 6th edition of this continental championship. It was held on November 6, 1922, at Estádio das Laranjeiras of Rio de Janeiro. At the end of the regular tournament, those two teams, along with Uruguay, were tied for the first place, but Uruguay withdrew from competing further.

Brazil won the match 3–0. With this victory, the team won its second continental title.

== Background ==
Brazil
Round
Paraguay
Opponent
Result
Group stage
Opponent
Result
Chile
1–1
Match 1
Brazil
1–1

Paraguay
1–1
Match 2
Chile
3–0

Uruguay
0–0
Match 3
Uruguay
1–0

Argentina
2–0
Match 4
Argentina
0–2

Team	Pld	W	D	L	GF	GA	GD	Pts
Brazil	4	1	3	0	4	2	+2	5
Paraguay	4	2	1	1	5	3	+2	5
Uruguay	4	2	1	1	3	1	+2	5
Argentina	4	2	0	2	6	3	+3	4
Chile	4	0	1	3	1	10	−9	1

Notes

- Brazil, Paraguay and Uruguay finished tied on points so a final round should have been played to decide the champion. As Uruguay withdrew, Brazil and Paraguay played a final match.

== Match details ==
November 6, 1922

Brazil	3–0	Paraguay
Neco 11'; Formiga 48', 89'

Estadio das Laranjeiras, Rio de Janeiro
Attendance: 20,000
Referee: Servando Pérez (Argentina)

Brazil	Paraguay

GK	Kuntz
RB	Palamone
LB	Barthô
RH	Laís
CH	Amílcar
LH	Fortes
OR	Formiga
IR	Neco
CF	Heitor Dominguez
IL	Tatú
OL	Rodrigues
Manager:
Laís

GK	Modesto Denis
RB	Ramón González
LB	Venancio Paredes
RH	Roque Centurión
CH	Manuel Fleitas Solich
LH	Luis Fretes
OR	Isidoro Benítez
IR	Luciano Capdevila
CF	Daniel Schaerer
IL	Ildefonso López
OL	Gerardo Rivas
Manager:
Manuel Fleitas Solich

== Aftermath ==
Brazil are the champions only because the tournament was held in Brazil

— Argentine magazine El Gráfico N° 174, 1922,
