= 1921 in Brazilian football =

Football in Brazil
- Season: 1921

The following article presents a summary of the 1921 football (soccer) season in Brazil, which was the 20th season of competitive football in the country.

== Campeonato Paulista ==
Final Standings

Position	Team	Points	Played	Won	Drawn	Lost	For	Against	Difference
1	Paulistano	39	22	19	1	2	98	14	84
2	Palestra Itália-SP	38	22	19	0	3	81	23	58
3	Corinthians	38	22	18	2	2	79	22	57
4	AA São Bento	25	22	11	3	8	42	41	1
5	Ypiranga-SP	22	22	9	4	9	35	58	−23
6	Minas Gerais	21	22	8	5	9	39	41	−2
7	Sírio	20	22	9	2	11	40	55	−15
8	Mackenzie-Portuguesa	17	22	7	3	12	25	48	−23
9	AA das Palmeiras	14	22	5	4	13	33	40	−7
10	Santos	13	22	5	3	14	26	61	−35
11	SC Internacional de São Paulo	8	22	4	2	16	36	83	−47
12	Germânia	7	22	2	3	17	19	67	−48

Paulistano declared as the Campeonato Paulista champions.

== State championship champions ==
State	Champion	State	Champion
Amazonas	Rio Negro	Paraná	Britânia
Bahia	Ypiranga-BA	Pernambuco	América-PE
Ceará	Fortaleza	Rio de Janeiro (DF)	Flamengo
Espírito Santo	Rio Branco-ES	Rio Grande do Norte	ABC
Maranhão	Football Athletic Club	Rio Grande do Sul	Grêmio
Minas Gerais	América-MG	São Paulo	Paulistano
Pará	Paysandu	Sergipe	Industrial
Paraíba	Palmeiras-PB		

== Brazil national team ==
The following table lists all the games played by the Brazil national football team in official competitions and friendly matches during 1921.

Date	Opposition	Result	Score	Brazil scorers	Competition
October 2, 1921	Argentina	L	0–1	–	South American Championship
October 12, 1921	Paraguay	W	3–0	Candiota, Machado (2)	South American Championship
October 23, 1921	Uruguay	L	1–2	Zezé I	South American Championship
