= Alfredinho =

Alfredinho is a nickname, a diminute for Alfredo in Portuguese. It may refer to:

- Alfredinho (footballer, born 1896) (1896–?), Brazilian football attacking midfielder
- Alfredinho (footballer, born 1927) (1927–2017), Brazilian football manager and former winger
