= 1921 Campeonato Carioca =

Campeonato Carioca
- Season: 1921
- Champions: Flamengo
- Matches: 88
- Goals: 339 (3.85 per match)
- Top goalscorer: Cecy (Villa Isabel) – 15 goals
- Biggest home win: Villa Isabel 7-1 Palmeiras (June 26, 1921)
- Biggest away win: Andarahy 0-5 Fluminense (April 10, 1921)
- Highest scoring: Villa Isabel 4-6 Mackenzie (April 24, 1921)

The 1921 Campeonato Carioca, the sixteenth edition of that championship, kicked off on April 3, 1921 and ended on September 7, 1921. It was organized by LMDT (Liga Metropolitana de Desportos Terrestres, or Metropolitan Land Sports League). Fourteen teams participated. Flamengo won the title for the 4th time. No teams were relegated.

== Participating teams ==
Club	Home location	Previous season
América	Tijuca, Rio de Janeiro	3rd
Americano	Engenho de Dentro, Rio de Janeiro	2nd (Second level)
Andarahy	Andaraí, Rio de Janeiro	5th
Bangu	Bangu, Rio de Janeiro	6th
Botafogo	Botafogo, Rio de Janeiro	4th
Carioca	Jardim Botânico, Rio de Janeiro	1st (Second level)
Flamengo	Flamengo, Rio de Janeiro	1st
Fluminense	Laranjeiras, Rio de Janeiro	2nd
Mackenzie	Méier, Rio de Janeiro	3rd (Second level)
Mangueira	Tijuca, Rio de Janeiro	10th
Palmeiras	São Cristóvão, Rio de Janeiro	9th
São Cristóvão	São Cristóvão, Rio de Janeiro	7th
Vasco da Gama	São Cristóvão, Rio de Janeiro	4th (Second level)
Villa Isabel	Vila Isabel, Rio de Janeiro	8th

== System ==
The tournament would be disputed in two stages:

- First stage: The fourteen teams would be divided into two groups of seven: Série A, with the teams that had finished from 1st to 7th in the previous year's championship, and Série B, with those that had finished from 8th to 10th, and four teams promoted from the Second Level. The teams in each group played each other in a double round-robin format. The champions of Série A and Série B would qualify into the Finals, while the last-placed team in Série B would dispute a playoff against the champions of the Second Level.
- Final stage: However, before the Finals, the champions of Série B would have to play against the last-placed team of Série A. If they won that match, they qualified for the Finals while the other team would be relegated to the Série B. In case of any other result, the Série A champions would win the title automatically, and no relegation or promotion across groups would take place.

== Championship ==
=== Série A ===
Pos	Team	Pld	W	D	L	GF	GA	GD	Pts	Qualification or relegation
1	Flamengo	12	5	5	2	33	24	+9	15	Playoffs to Finals
2	América	12	6	3	3	28	25	+3	15	Playoffs to Finals
3	Bangu	12	4	4	4	22	25	−3	12	
4	Andarahy	12	5	2	5	22	28	−6	12	
5	Botafogo	12	4	3	5	21	17	+4	11	
6	São Cristóvão	12	4	3	5	16	21	−5	11	
7	Fluminense	12	3	2	7	22	24	−2	8	Qualifying Match for Finals

Updated to match(es) played on August 28, 1921. Source: RSSSF.com
Rules for classification: 1) points; 2) goal difference; 3) wins; 4) number of goals scored.

==== Playoffs ====
4 September 1921

Flamengo	2 – 1 (a.e.t.)	América
Nonô 62'; Candiota 87'		Chiquinho 43'

Laranjeiras, Rio de Janeiro
Attendance: 25,000
Referee: Everardo Martins Tinoco

=== Série B ===
Pos	Team	Pld	W	D	L	GF	GA	GD	Pts	Qualification or relegation
1	Villa Isabel	12	9	0	3	42	19	+23	18	Qualifying Match for Finals
2	Carioca	12	6	4	2	25	18	+7	16	
3	Vasco da Gama	12	6	3	3	27	17	+10	15	
4	Mangueira	12	4	0	8	15	27	−12	10 (Note: Mangueira won the points of a loss against Americano)	
5	Mackenzie	12	4	1	7	25	31	−6	9	
6	Americano	12	3	4	5	17	25	−8	8	Playouts
7	Palmeiras	12	3	2	7	15	29	−14	8	Playouts

Updated to match(es) played on August 28, 1921. Source: RSSSF.com
Rules for classification: 1) points; 2) goal difference; 3) wins; 4) number of goals scored.

==== Playouts ====
25 September 1921

Americano	1 – 0	Palmeiras

Rua Campos Salles, Rio de Janeiro

=== Relegation Playoffs ===
2 October 1921

Palmeiras	2 – 1	Bomsuccesso

Rua General Severiano, Rio de Janeiro

=== Final phase ===
7 September 1921

Fluminense	3 – 1	Villa Isabel
Harry Welfare; Machado		Cecy 43'

Rua General Severiano, Rio de Janeiro
Referee: Virgílio Fedrighi

Villa Isabel eliminated; Flamengo declared champions

=== Final standings ===
Pos	Team	Pld	W	D	L	GF	GA	GD	Pts	Qualification or relegation
1	Flamengo	12	5	5	2	33	24	+9	15	Champions
2	América	12	6	3	3	28	25	+3	15	
3	Bangu	12	4	4	4	22	25	−3	12	
4	Andarahy	12	5	2	5	22	28	−6	12	
5	Botafogo	12	4	3	5	21	17	+4	11	
6	São Cristóvão	12	4	3	5	16	21	−5	11	
7	Fluminense	12	3	2	7	22	24	−2	8	
8	Villa Isabel	12	9	0	3	42	19	+23	18	
9	Carioca	12	6	4	2	25	18	+7	16	
10	Vasco da Gama	12	6	3	3	27	17	+10	15	
11	Mangueira	12	4	0	8	15	27	−12	10	
12	Mackenzie	12	4	1	7	25	31	−6	9	
13	Americano	12	3	4	5	17	25	−8	8	
14	Palmeiras	12	3	2	7	15	29	−14	8	

Updated to match(es) played on September 7, 1921. Source: RSSSF.com
Rules for classification: 1) points; 2) goal difference; 3) wins; 4) number of goals scored.
