= Roca Cup =

Copa Julio A. Roca
- The trophy awarded to champions
- Organiser(s): AFA; CBF
- Founded: 1914
- Abolished: 1976; 50 years ago
- Region: South America
- Teams: 2
- Related competitions: Superclásico de las Américas
- Last champions: Brazil (1976)
- Most championships: Brazil (8 titles)

The Roca Cup (Spanish: Copa Roca) was a football competition contested between Argentina and Brazil national teams from 1914 to 1976 on irregular basis. The Copa Roca was the first trophy, official or unofficial, ever won by a Brazil national team.

== History ==
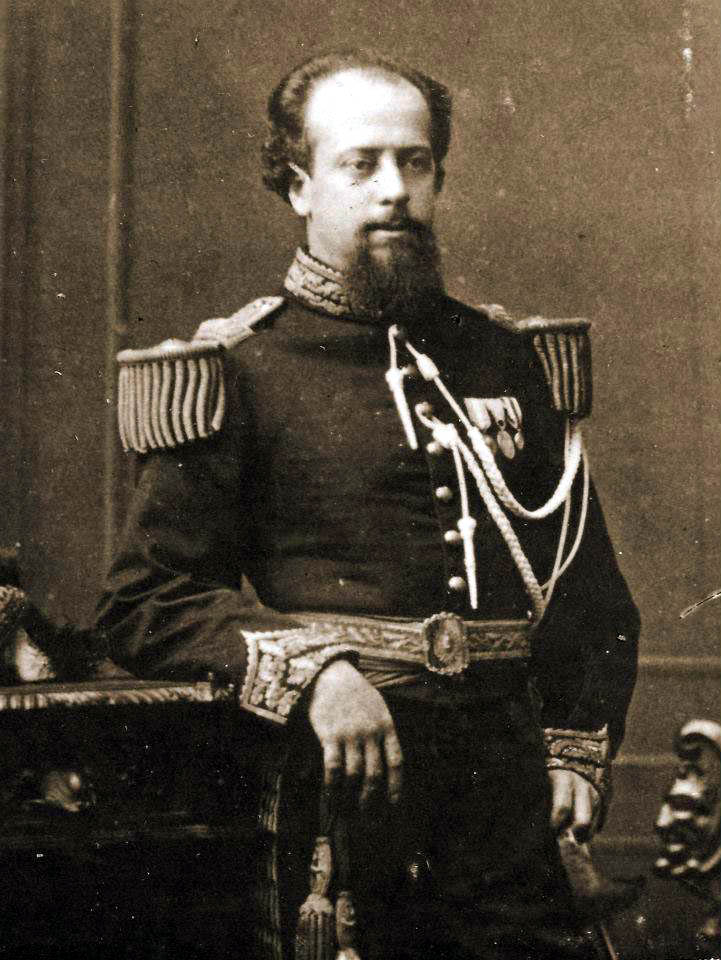
Julio A. Roca, then President of Argentina, donated the trophy

The competition was created by former President of Argentina, General Julio Argentino Roca, in 1913. A football enthusiast, Roca was at the time the Argentine ambassador in Brazil and felt matches between both countries would create a healthy rivalry and help the sport to develop. The Cup would be played each year in a different country, a fact that was actually kept in spite of the many changes to the Cup's format.

Roca donated a trophy to dissident body Federación Argentina de Football ("Argentine Football Federation" – FAF) and it was agreed that the competition would be played for three consecutive years in a single-leg format and the country with two wins would conquer the trophy forever. But in 1915 the FAF merged with Argentine Football Association, and the following matches were not played. In 1922, the Brazilian Football Confederation agreed to play the competition again, which Brazil won for the second time, and thus claimed the Roca Cup ownership, even though Argentina beat them the following year. Many sources say the 1922 match would not be a Class A match, because Brazil played with their B team; the brazilian first team played the same day the 1922 Copa America final vs. Paraguay). Argentine Football Association do not consider this match as official.

In 1938, both football associations, AFA and CBF, accepted to play the competition once again. The format was changed and the trophy would be kept by the most recent winner. In case the first two matches finished in draws or each team had a win, then a third leg had to be played. In January 1939, Argentina got a 5–1 victory in Rio de Janeiro. The following game was packed with incidents and the visiting team left the pitch enraged after the referee awarded a penalty to Brazil. However the home side went on to score a third goal when the Argentine team had already left the field in protest. A third and fourth match were played in São Paulo, giving the victory to Argentina. The 1940 edition was played in Argentina, where Argentina won two matches (6–1 and 5–1) and Brazil won one (7-1)

In 1957's match, at Maracanã, Pelé made his debut in Brazil national team, drafted by coach Sylvio Pirillo, where he scored the first of many goals with the Brazilian jersey. From 1940 on, Brazil won every edition, except for the 1971 Cup, when with two draws, the Cup was also declared tied.

== List of champions ==
=== Matches ===
The following list includes all the editions of the Copa Julio A. Roca. Since 1939, the cup was played under a two-legged format. No goal difference was taken into account so in case of both teams won one match each, a playoff was held to define a champion. Nevertheless, since 1957 the cup was defined by goal difference between both matches.

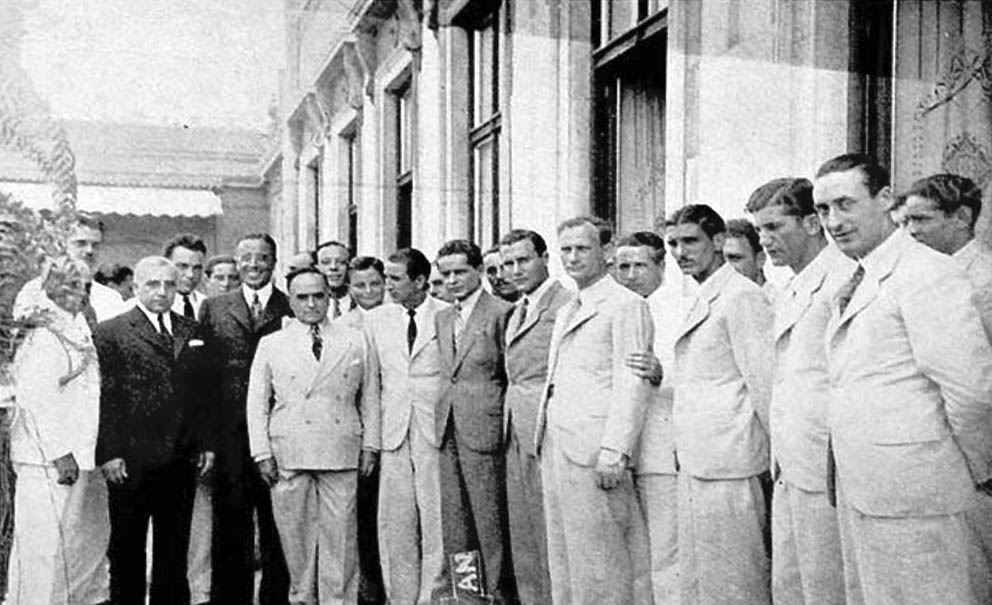
President of Brazil Getúlio Vargas meeting the Argentine players, January 1939

| Ed. | Year | Winner | Score | City | Venue | Agg. |
|---|---|---|---|---|---|---|
| 1 | 1914 | Brazil | 1–0 | Buenos Aires | GEBA | – |
| 2 | 1922 (Note: Many sources say it was not a “Class A match”. Brazil played with their B team, because the A team played the same day the 1922 Copa America final vs. Paraguay. Argentine Football Association do not consider this match as official.) | Brazil | 2–1 | São Paulo | Parque Antarctica | – |
| 3 | 1923 | Argentina | 2–0 | Buenos Aires | Sportivo Barracas | – |
| 4 | 1939 (Note: The first two games were held in 1939, and the other two, postponed to February 1940 due to incidents in the second match. As the playoff game ended in a 2–2 draw after extra time, a fourth match was held to break the tie.) | Argentina | 5–1 | Rio de Janeiro | São Januário | 5–3 (Note: Final score on points.) |
| 4 | 1939 | Argentina | 2–3 | Rio de Janeiro | São Januário | 5–3 |
| 4 | 1939 | Argentina | 2–2 (a.e.t.) | São Paulo | Parque Antarctica | 5–3 |
| 4 | 1939 | Argentina | 3–0 | São Paulo | Parque Antarctica | 5–3 |
| 5 | 1940 | Argentina | 6–1 | Buenos Aires | San Lorenzo | 4–2 |
| 5 | 1940 | Argentina | 2–3 | Buenos Aires | San Lorenzo | 4–2 |
| 5 | 1940 | Argentina | 5–1 | Avellaneda | Independiente | 4–2 |
| 6 | 1945 | Brazil | 3–4 | São Paulo | Pacaembu | 4–2 |
| 6 | 1945 | Brazil | 6–2 | Rio de Janeiro | São Januário | 4–2 |
| 6 | 1945 | Brazil | 3–1 | Rio de Janeiro | São Januário | 4–2 |
| 7 | 1957 | Brazil | 1–2 | Rio de Janeiro | Maracanã | 3–2 |
| 7 | 1957 | Brazil | 2–0 (a.e.t.) | São Paulo | Pacaembu | 3–2 |
| 8 | 1960 | Brazil | 2–4 | Buenos Aires | River Plate | 6–5 |
| 8 | 1960 | Brazil | 4–1 (a.e.t.) | Buenos Aires | River Plate | 6–5 |
| 9 | 1963 | Brazil | 2–3 | São Paulo | Morumbi | 7–5 |
| 9 | 1963 | Brazil | 5–2 (a.e.t.) | Rio de Janeiro | Maracanã | 7–5 |
| 10 | 1971 | Argentina & Brazil (Note: As Brazil and Argentina had won one match each and no playoff was held, the title was shared.) | 1–1 | Buenos Aires | River Plate | 3–3 |
| 10 | 1971 | Argentina & Brazil | 2–2 (a.e.t.) | Buenos Aires | River Plate | 3–3 |
| 11 | 1976 | Brazil | 2–1 | Buenos Aires | River Plate | 4–1 |
| 11 | 1976 | Brazil | 2–0 | Rio de Janeiro | Maracanã | 4–1 |

=== Titles by country ===
| Team | Titles | Years won |
|---|---|---|
| Brazil | 8 | 1914, 1922 (Note: Argentine Football Association do not consider this match as official.), 1945, 1957, 1960, 1963, 1971, 1976 |
| Argentina | 4 | 1923, 1939, 1940, 1971 |
