= Venancio Paredes =

Paraguayan footballer

Personal information
- Place of birth: Paraguay
- Position: Defender

Senior career*
Years	Team	Apps	(Gls)
1919–1923	Club Guaraní		

International career
1919–1923	Paraguay	18	(0)
- * Club domestic league appearances and goals

Venancio Paredes was a Paraguayan footballer who played as a defender. He represented Club Guaraní and the Paraguay national team during the early decades of organised football in Paraguay.

Paredes participated in three editions of the South American Championship, the predecessor of the Copa América, in 1921, 1922 and 1923. He was a member of the Paraguayan team that finished as runners-up in 1922 and third in 1923.

At club level, he won the Paraguayan Primera División with Guaraní in 1921 and 1923.

== Club career ==
Paredes played for Club Guaraní, a football club based in Asunción, Paraguay.

Historical records identify him as a Guaraní player between 1919 and 1923, although the precise dates of his arrival and departure from the club, as well as his total number of league appearances, are not known.

Paredes was part of the Guaraní team that won the Paraguayan First Division championship in 1921.

The club won the championship again in 1923, with Paredes among its prominent players.

The Paraguayan championship was not held in 1922 because of political unrest and the Paraguayan Civil War. Consequently, Guaraní's victories in 1921 and 1923 represented consecutive editions of the national championship.

In a historical review of the club, Paraguayan newspaper ABC Color identified Paredes alongside Ildefonso López, Vicente Perito, Lázaro Ávila, Mauricio Dúo, Eusebio Díaz, Rafael Zorazábal and Jaime Parceriza as notable members of the championship-winning teams.

== International career ==
=== Early international appearances (1919) ===
Paredes represented Paraguay before the country's first participation in the South American Championship.

Historical international records list three appearances for Paredes against Argentina in May 1919.

The matches were played in Paraguay on 18, 21 and 24 May 1919. Paraguay lost 3–0 in the opening match and 2–1 in each of the following two encounters.

These matches formed part of Paraguay's early international football history, before the national team began competing regularly in continental tournaments.

=== 1921 South American Championship ===
As a player for Club Guaraní, Paredes was selected for the Paraguay squad participating in the 1921 South American Championship, held in Buenos Aires, Argentina.

The competition marked Paraguay's first appearance in the South American Championship.

Paredes appeared in all three of Paraguay's matches:

- 9 October 1921: Paraguay defeated Uruguay 2–1.
- 12 October 1921: Paraguay lost 3–0 to Brazil.
- 16 October 1921: Paraguay lost 3–0 to Argentina.

Paraguay finished fourth in the four-team tournament, recording one victory and two defeats.

The opening victory over Uruguay was a significant result in Paraguay's early international football history, as it represented the country's first victory in the South American Championship.

Paredes also represented Paraguay in a friendly against Uruguay on 2 November 1921, which Uruguay won 4–2.

=== 1922 South American Championship ===
Paredes was again selected for the national team at the 1922 South American Championship, hosted by Brazil in Rio de Janeiro.

Paraguay produced a much stronger performance than in the previous tournament and finished as runners-up.

Paredes appeared in all five of Paraguay's matches, including the championship play-off.

Paraguay's results were:

- 24 September: Brazil 1–1 Paraguay.
- 5 October: Paraguay 3–0 Chile.
- 12 October: Uruguay 0–1 Paraguay.
- 18 October: Paraguay 0–2 Argentina.
- 6 November: Brazil 3–0 Paraguay (championship play-off).

At the end of the initial round-robin stage, Brazil, Paraguay and Uruguay were level on points. A play-off was arranged to determine the championship.

Uruguay withdrew from the play-off, leaving Brazil and Paraguay to contest the title.

Brazil won the decisive match 3–0 at the Estádio das Laranjeiras, becoming South American champions, while Paraguay finished second.

Paredes played in defence during the final, alongside Ramón González. The Paraguayan team was coached by Manuel Fleitas Solich.

=== 1923 Copa Chevallier Boutell ===
In May 1923, Paredes participated in the Copa Chevallier Boutell, an international competition contested between Argentina and Paraguay.

The inaugural edition was played in Buenos Aires over two matches.

On 20 May 1923, Paraguay defeated Argentina 2–0 at the Estadio Sportivo Barracas. Paredes was included in Paraguay's starting line-up as a defender.

In the second match, played on 25 May, Argentina defeated Paraguay 1–0.

Despite losing the return match, Paraguay won the competition on aggregate by two goals to one.

Paredes appeared in both encounters, contributing to Paraguay's first Copa Chevallier Boutell title.

=== 1923 South American Championship ===
Paredes took part in his third consecutive South American Championship in 1923, hosted by Uruguay.

He remained a player for Club Guaraní during the tournament.

Paredes appeared in two of Paraguay's three championship matches:

- 29 October: Argentina defeated Paraguay 4–3.
- 4 November: Uruguay defeated Paraguay 2–0.

Paraguay subsequently defeated Brazil 1–0 in its final match and finished third in the competition.

Paredes also appeared in an international friendly against Brazil in November 1923, which Brazil won 2–0.

== Career statistics ==
=== International ===
The following statistics are based on historical records compiled by National Football Teams.

International appearances for Paraguay
Year	Appearances	Goals
1919	3	0
1921	4	0
1922	6	0
1923	5	0
Total	18	0

The National Football Teams database records 18 appearances between 1919 and 1923. The higher total includes three appearances in 1919 and additional international friendly matches.

== Honours ==
Club Guaraní

- Paraguayan Primera División: 1921, 1923

Paraguay

- South American Championship
  - Runners-up: 1922
  - Third place: 1923
- Copa Chevallier Boutell: 1923

== Bibliography ==
- Wołek, Tomasz (1995). Encyklopedia piłkarska FUJI. Copa America. Katowice: Wydawnictwo GiA, pp. 22, 24–25, 28. ISBN 83-902751-2-0.
