= Vicente González (footballer) =

Argentine footballer

Personal information
- Date of birth: 1904
- Position: Forward

International career
Years	Team	Apps	(Gls)
1921	Argentina	2	(0)

Vicente González (born 1904, date of death unknown) was an Argentine footballer. He played in two matches for the Argentina national football team in 1921. He was also part of Argentina's squad for the 1921 South American Championship.
