= Manuel Radice =

Paraguayan footballer

Personal information
- Position: Goalkeeper

International career
Years	Team	Apps	(Gls)
1921	Paraguay	2	(0)

Manuel Radice was a Paraguayan footballer who played as a goalkeeper. He represented the Paraguay national team in 1921 and was a member of the Paraguayan squad that participated in the 1921 South American Championship, now known as the Copa América.

== International career ==
Radice represented Paraguay during the country's early years of international football. He was selected for the 1921 South American Championship, held in Buenos Aires, Argentina, from 2 to 30 October 1921. The competition was Paraguay's first appearance in the South American Championship.

Four national teams participated in the tournament: Argentina, Brazil, Paraguay and Uruguay. Each team played the other three once.

Paraguay began the tournament with a historic 2–1 victory over Uruguay on 9 October 1921, with goals from Gerardo Rivas and Ildefonso López. This was Paraguay's first match in the competition and its first victory in the South American Championship.

Ángel Portaluppi was Paraguay's goalkeeper in the opening two matches, including the 3–0 defeat against Brazil on 12 October. Radice replaced Portaluppi for Paraguay's final match against the hosts, Argentina, on 16 October 1921.

The match took place at the Estadio Sportivo Barracas in Buenos Aires, in front of approximately 25,000 spectators. Argentina defeated Paraguay 3–0, with goals scored by Julio Libonatti, Blas Saruppo and Raúl Echeverría. Radice played the entire match in goal for Paraguay.

Paraguay finished fourth in the tournament, recording one victory and two defeats. Argentina won the championship, securing its first South American title.

After the tournament, Radice made another international appearance on 2 November 1921, when Paraguay faced Uruguay in a friendly at the Parque Central stadium in Montevideo. Paraguay lost the match 4–2.

According to National Football Teams, Radice made two international appearances for Paraguay in 1921, without scoring a goal.

== International appearances ==
Date	Opponent	Result	Competition	Venue
16 October 1921	Argentina	0–3	1921 South American Championship	Buenos Aires, Argentina
2 November 1921	Uruguay	2–4	Friendly	Montevideo, Uruguay

== Career statistics ==
=== International ===
National team	Year	Appearances	Goals
Paraguay	1921	2	0
Total		2	0

== See also ==
- Paraguay national football team
- 1921 South American Championship
- Paraguay at the Copa América
