= Frederico Pinheiro =

Brazilian footballer (born 1901)

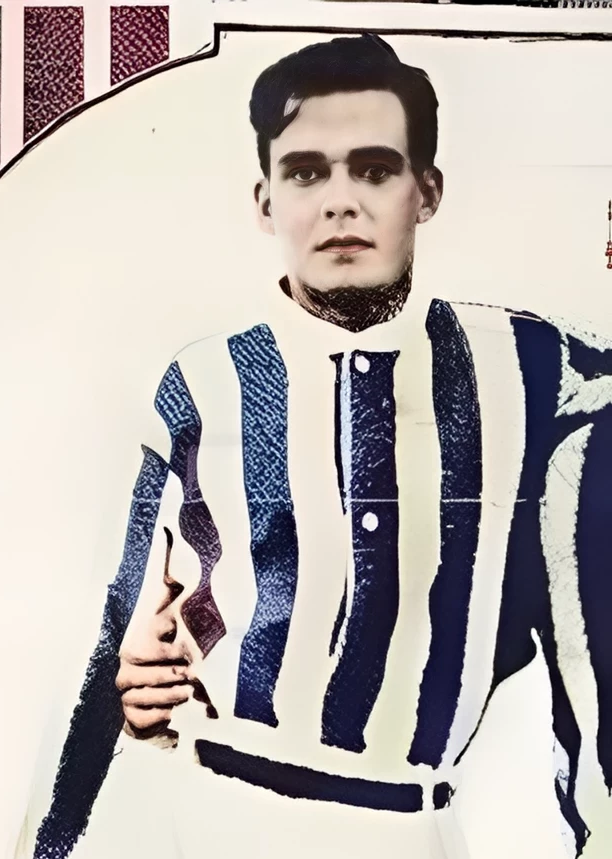

Personal information
- Date of birth: 17 April 1901
- Position: Forward

International career
Years	Team	Apps	(Gls)
1921	Brazil	2	(0)

Frederico Pinheiro (born 17 April 1901, date of death unknown) was a Brazilian footballer. He played in two matches for the Brazil national football team in 1921. He was also part of Brazil's squad for the 1921 South American Championship.
