= Barata (footballer, born 1899) =

Brazilian footballer (born 1899)

Personal information
- Full name: Lair Paulo Barata Ribeiro
- Date of birth: 29 December 1899
- Place of birth: Rio de Janeiro, Brazil
- Position: Defender

International career
| Years | Team | Apps | (Gls) |
| 1921 | Brazil | 3 | (0) |

Lair Paulo Barata Ribeiro (born 29 December 1899, date of death unknown), known as just Barata, was a Brazilian footballer. He played in three matches for the Brazil national football team in 1921. He was also part of Brazil's squad for the 1921 South American Championship.
