= Cecy =

Brazilian footballer

Personal information
- Full name: Sylvio Moreira
- Date of birth: 7 December 1897
- Place of birth: Niterói, Brazil
- Date of death: Unknown (after 1951)
- Position: Inside left

Senior career*
Years	Team	Apps	(Gls)
1917–1922	Vila Isabel		
1923–1924	Vasco da Gama	39	(21)
- * Club domestic league appearances and goals as of 22 February 2024

Sylvio Moreira (7 December 1897 –?), better known as Cecy, was a Brazilian footballer who played as a Inside left.

== Career ==
An employee of a weaving company, Sylvio Moreira, known as Cecy, began his football career with Vila Isabel, a team for which he had played since 1917 and was top scorer in 1921, champion of group B of the LMDT. In 1923, he went to Vasco, and there he became one of the first great idols in the club's history. A midfielder, he stood out for his ability to score goals from behind, and as part of the squad called "Camisas Negras" (Black Shirts) he was one of the first black players to achieve success in the Campeonato Carioca. For Vasco he made 39 appearances and scored 21 goals, two of them in the 3–1 victory against Flamengo, in the first victory of Vasco da Gama at the Clássico dos Milhões. He was honored by Vasco in 1951, but little is known about his life after leaving football.

== Honours ==
Vasco da Gama

- Campeonato Carioca: 1923, 1924

Vila Isabel

- Group B of LMDT league: 1921

Individual

- 1921 Campeonato Carioca top scorer: 15 goals
