= Orlandinho =

Brazilian footballer

Personal information
- Full name: Orlando Moreira
- Date of birth: 30 November 1899

International career
Years	Team	Apps	(Gls)
1921	Brazil	3	(0)

Orlando Moreira (born 30 November 1899, date of death unknown), known as Orlandinho, was a Brazilian footballer. He played in three matches for the Brazil national football team in 1921. He was also part of Brazil's squad for the 1921 South American Championship.
