= Angel Portaluppi =

Paraguayan football and tennis player

Ángel Portaluppi
Personal information
- Date of birth: 14 April 1898
- Place of birth: Paraguay
- Position: Goalkeeper

Senior career*
Years	Team	Apps	(Gls)
1917–1921	Libertad		

International career
1919–1921	Paraguay	2	(0)
- * Club domestic league appearances and goals

Ángel Portaluppi (born 14 April 1898) was a Paraguayan sportsman who played as a goalkeeper for Club Libertad and the Paraguay national football team. He was part of the Paraguayan team that participated in the 1921 South American Championship, the country's first appearance in the competition. He also played tennis and represented Paraguay in the Davis Cup.

== Football career ==
=== Club career ===
Portaluppi played for Club Libertad, one of Paraguay's oldest football clubs, during the early decades of organised football in the country.

In 1917, he helped Libertad win the Paraguayan Primera División championship. He was the club's goalkeeper in the championship-deciding match against Club Olimpia on 4 November 1917, played at the Estadio de la Liga Paraguaya in Sajonia. Libertad's starting team included Portaluppi, Romero, Andreu, Pane, Masi, Cantuni, Caballero, Arbo, Rufino Gorostiaga, Basiliano Villamayor and Almeida Huerta.

=== International career ===
==== Early international appearances ====
Portaluppi was among the footballers who represented Paraguay during the early years of the national team's international history.

He played in matches against Argentina in May 1919, when Paraguay was beginning to establish regular international competition. He was part of the team that lost 5–1 to Argentina in Asunción on 11 May 1919 and subsequently appeared in further matches against the same opponents.

==== 1921 South American Championship ====
Portaluppi was selected for Paraguay's squad at the 1921 South American Championship, held in Buenos Aires, Argentina. The tournament marked Paraguay's debut in the continental championship, which later became known as the Copa América.

On 9 October 1921, Portaluppi was the starting goalkeeper in Paraguay's first match of the competition, against defending champions Uruguay at the Estadio Sportivo Barracas in Buenos Aires.

Paraguay achieved a historic 2–1 victory, with goals from Gerardo Rivas and Ildefonso López. Uruguay's goal was scored by José Piendibene. The result was Paraguay's first victory in the South American Championship and one of the country's earliest major international football achievements.

Portaluppi retained his position for Paraguay's second match on 12 October, when the team lost 3–0 to Brazil. Brazil's goals were scored by Machado, who scored twice, and Candiota.

He made two appearances during the championship, conceding four goals. Manuel Radice replaced him in goal for Paraguay's final match, a 3–0 defeat against Argentina on 16 October.

Paraguay finished fourth in the competition, behind Argentina, Brazil and Uruguay.

==== Later appearances in 1921 ====
Following the South American Championship, Portaluppi continued to represent Paraguay.

On 6 November 1921, he played in goal in a friendly against Tiro Federal in Rosario. The match took place at the ground of Newell's Old Boys and ended in a 4–0 victory for the Argentine club.

== Tennis career ==
In addition to football, Portaluppi was active as a tennis player and represented Paraguay in the Davis Cup, the leading international team competition in men's tennis.

== Honours ==
=== Club Libertad ===
- Paraguayan Primera División: 1917

== Bibliography ==
- Bestard, Miguel Ángel. 80 años de fútbol en el Paraguay, 1900 a 1980.
- Wołek, Tomasz. Encyklopedia piłkarska FUJI. Copa America. Wydawnictwo GiA, Katowice, 1995. ISBN 83-902751-2-0, p. 22.
