= Américo Tesoriere =

Argentine footballer (1899–1977)

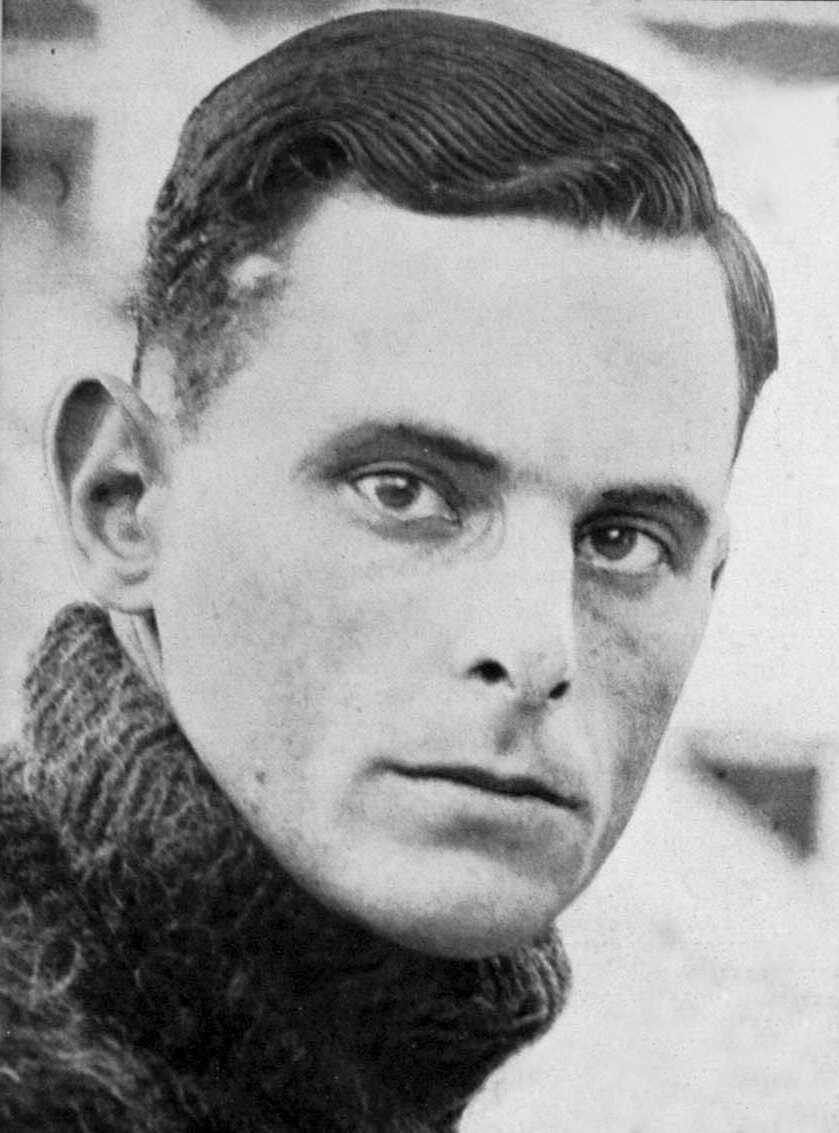
- Tesoriere in 1927 as he appeared on the cover of El Gráfico

Personal information
- Full name: Américo Miguel Tesoriere
- Date of birth: March 18, 1899
- Place of birth: Buenos Aires, Argentina
- Date of death: December 30, 1977 (aged 78)
- Position: Goalkeeper

Youth career
- 1916–1917: Boca Juniors

Senior career*
Years	Team	Apps	(Gls)
1917–1920	Boca Juniors	47	(0)
1921	Sportivo del Norte	?	(?)
1922–1927	Boca Juniors	97	(0)

International career
1919–1925	Argentina	37	(0)
- * Club domestic league appearances and goals

Américo Miguel Tesoriere, sometimes nicknamed Mérico (Buenos Aires, March 18, 1899 – December 30, 1977), was an Argentine football goalkeeper who spent most of his career in Boca Juniors, where he became an early idol and remaining as a legend of the club. Tesoriere is also regarded as one of the best Argentine goalkeepers ever.

Tesoriere was the third goalkeeper in the history-of the Argentina national team after José Buruca Laforia and Carlos Wilson, winning two Copa América with the squad and keeping his goal unbeaten in both competitions.

At club level, Tesoriere won 13 titles with Boca Juniors, being one of the most winning players in the history of the club behind Sebastián Battaglia.

He played for Argentina national football team between 1919 and 1925.

== Biography ==
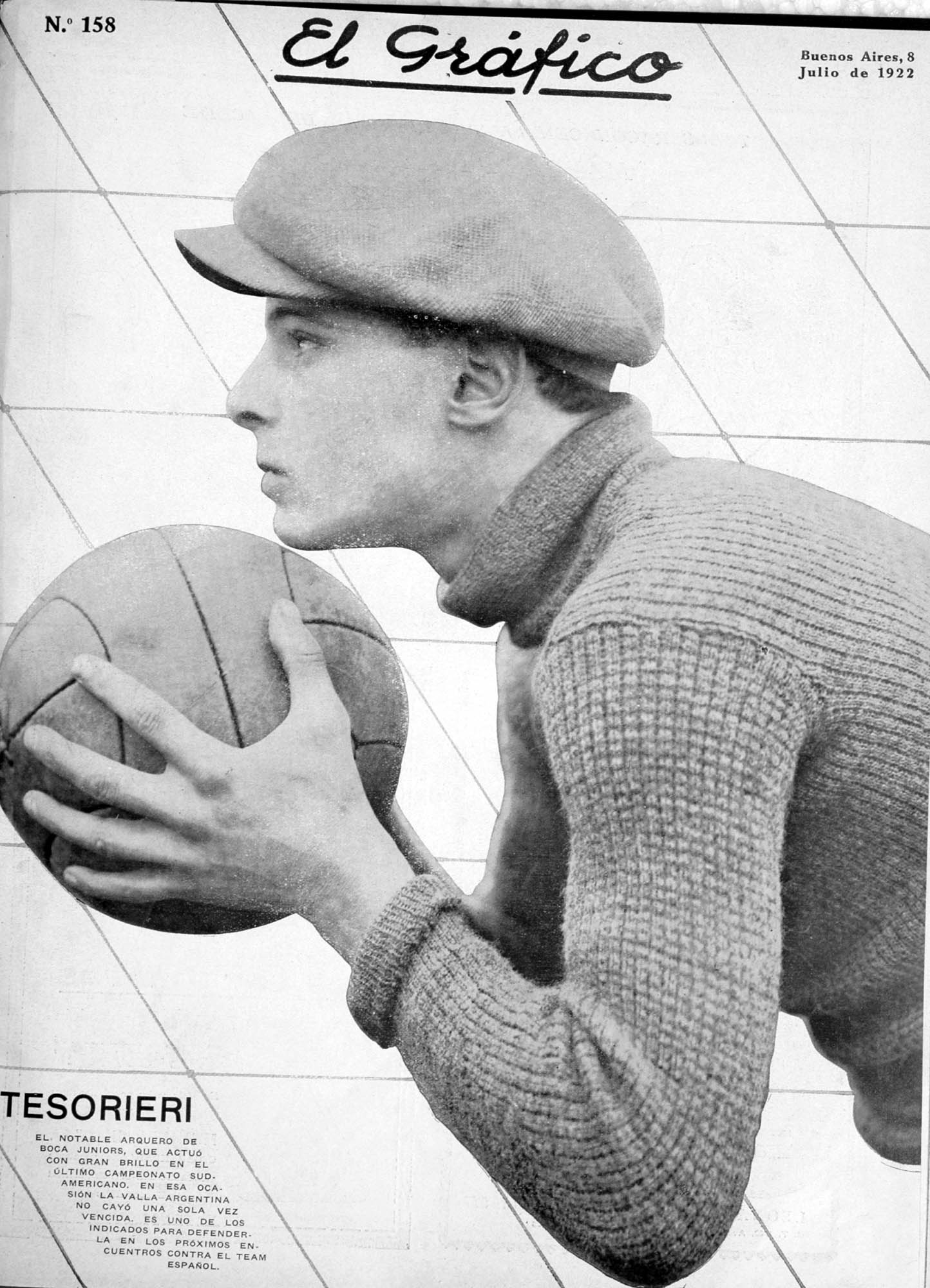
Tesoriere on the cover of El Gráfico n° 158 (July 1922), the first time the publication displayed a football player as its main subject

Born in Barracas as Américo Miguel Tesoriero in 1899, he "established" a club with his boyhood friends, "Coronel Brandsen", named after the street where they used to play football, just in front of a butcher shop. They paid the butcher 10 cents a month to play there. When he was ten, Tesoriere went to a Boca Juniors match with his friends, becoming a strong club supporter since then. In those times Boca Juniors was not the mass phenomenon that the club would become in successive years so most of the supporters knew each other.

Tesoriere started his career as goalkeeper in Club Aurora of La Boca. In 1916 a representative of Boca Juniors, Antonio Buccelli, offered Tesoriere to play for the club in the second division. Bucceli discovered Tesoriere while he was playing on a vacant land next to BA&ER rail tracks, just on Brandsen on Del Crucero streets, where the Boca Juniors stadium would start to be built in 1922. After a meeting between Tesoriere and the executives of the club, some of them did not show interest in the goalkeeper (they considered he was not physically fit to play football) but Buccelli convinced them and Tesoriere joined Boca Juniors.

Tesoriere bought his first football boots to former Alumni's legend Jorge Brown. He played in the youth divisions until his official debut in the senior squad in the 1917 Primera División championship on July 22, when Boca Juniors played v Gimnasia y Esgrima (BA). Tesoriere replaced Nicolás Fabbiani, who had been seriously injured in the previous match v Tigre.

Tesoriere played for Boca Juniors until 1927, except for the 1921 season when he played for Sportivo del Norte.

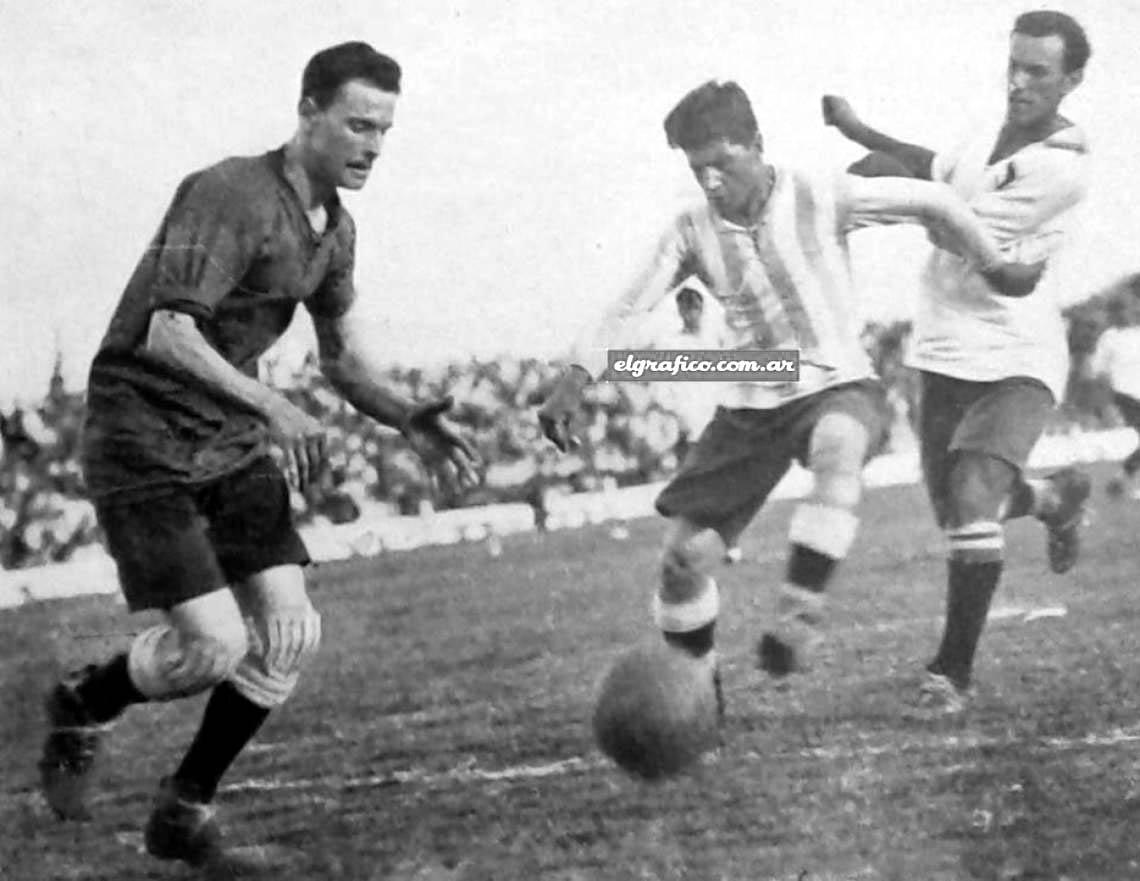
Tesoriere (wearing his characteristic tricot) playing for Argentina in 1925

Nicknamed La Gloria, Tesoriere soon gained the attention of media and fans for his skills and good performances, being called up for the Argentina national team in 1920. With Argentina he won the 1921 and 1925 Copa América (then called "Campeonato Sudamericano"). In the 1921 edition, he kept his goal unbeaten.

At the end of the Argentina v. Uruguay match for the 1924 South American Championship, Tesoriere was carried aloft by the Uruguayan supporters as a recognition for his outstanding performance during the game. The crowd said to President of Uruguay, José Serrato (who had attended the match): "Sir, this man did not allow us to defeat the Argentine team".

Tesoriere was also the first footballer to appear on the cover of El Gráfico, the most famous sports magazine of Argentina, in July 1922.

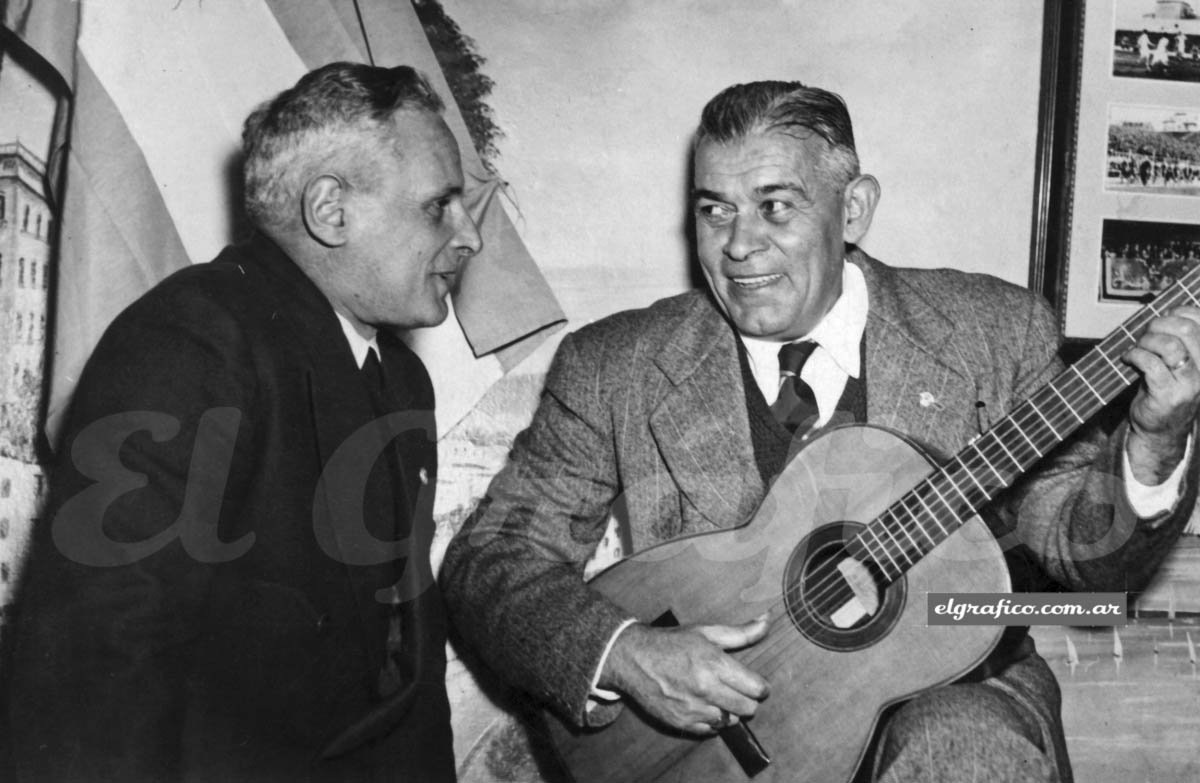
Tesoriere (left) with former Rosario Central goalkeeper Octavio Díaz in July 1950

He was part of the Boca Juniors team that toured on Europe in 1925, receiving only 16 goals in 19 matches played. With Boca Juniors, Tesoriere played 184 matches, winning a total of 14 titles, including five Primera División championships and seven National cups and two international cups. With the Argentina national team, he won two Copa Américas in 32 matches played.

On 31 December 1927, Tesoriere played his last official match for Boca Juniors, when the squad beat San Lorenzo 2–1 at Estadio Gasómetro in the last round of the 1927 Primera División championship. Nevertheless, Tesoriere played nine friendly pre-season matches in 1928, the last on August 4. Manuel Merello (who had debuted in the club in 1924) replaced Tesoriere since the 1928 season.

After leaving the club, Tesoriere returned to Boca Juniors ten years later in an administrative role and stayed with the club as groundsman until 1953. On May 25, 1940, Tesoriere raised the Argentine flag at the inauguration of La Bombonera.

When he was answered about his retirement at a short age, Tesoriere stated: "I decided to retire because of the internal problems in Boca Juniors. I was part of the elections, but always in the loser side, of course".

Tesoriere died on December 30, 1977, at the age of 78.

The famous song "We have a goalkeeper who is a marvel himself; He stops penalty shots sitting on a chair" was composed by the Boca Juniors supporters in honor of Tesoriere.

== Titles ==
=== Club ===
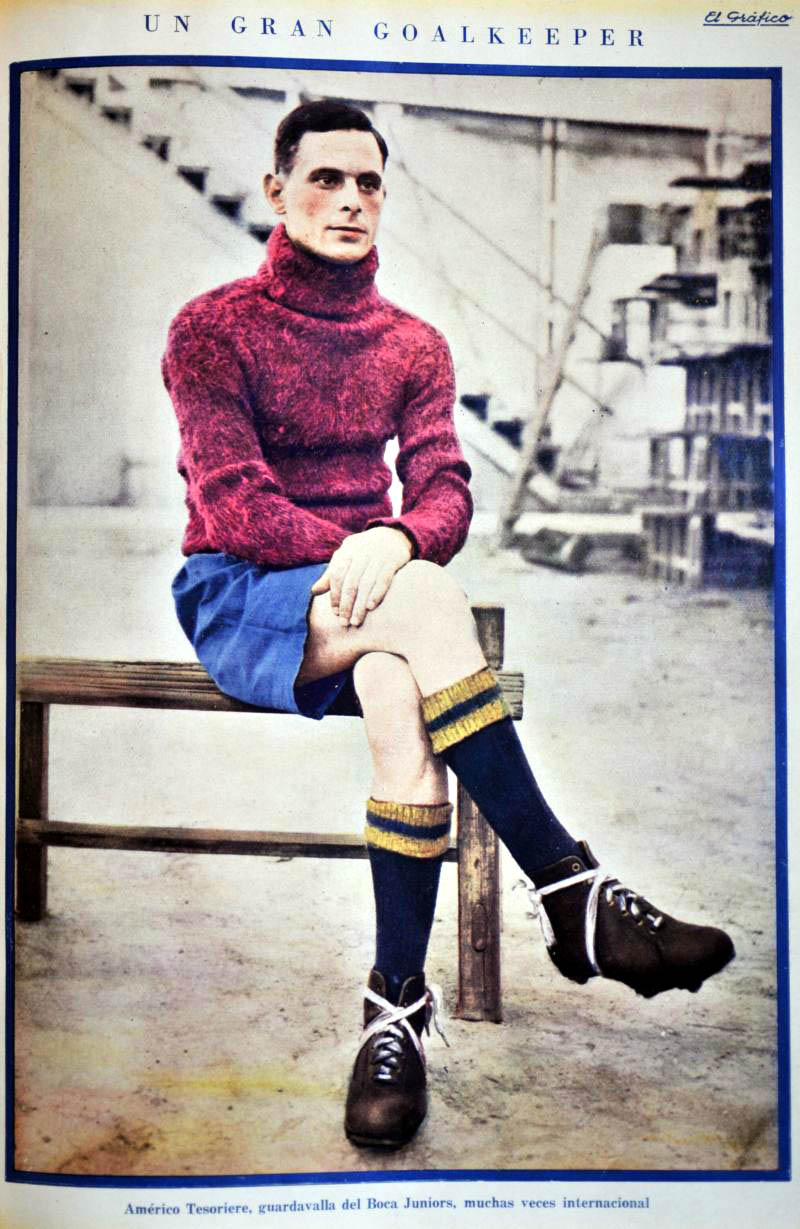
Tesoriere portrayed on a El Gráfico poster, being described as "a great goalkeeper", 1926

Boca Juniors

- Primera División (5): 1919, 1920, 1923, 1924, 1926
- Copa Competencia Jockey Club (3): 1919, 1925
- Copa Ibarguren (3): 1919, 1923, 1924
- Copa Estímulo (1): 1926
- Tie Cup (1): 1919
- Copa de Honor Cousenier (1): 1920

=== National team ===
Argentina

- Copa América (2): 1921, 1925

== Writing ==
Tesoriere was very fond of poetry, having written several poems that were compiled by his son Eduardo and edited on the book Américo, el poeta del arco, published in 2017. The book also contained Tesoriere's memories, written as chronicles for magazines and newspapers in the 1960s. The poems depicted some of the most characteristics landscapes of La Boca, describing its carnivals, the first matches of Boca Juniors, the bars, and streets of the neighborhood.

The moon was one of the favorite topics to write his poems. The book also mentioned people from La Boca (including notable painter Benito Quinquela Martín) and John Diggs (Jonedick), player of River Plate during the 1910s, when the club was still located in La Boca. Diggs was the field keeper of the club and allowed children to play there.

Old moon,
indiscreet,
if you have spied
the unfortunate poet
rolling like a dog
without an owner,
through riverside coffee shops
of alcohol and small dreams

— Américo Tesoriere, "Secreto", Américo, el poeta del arco

== In his own words ==
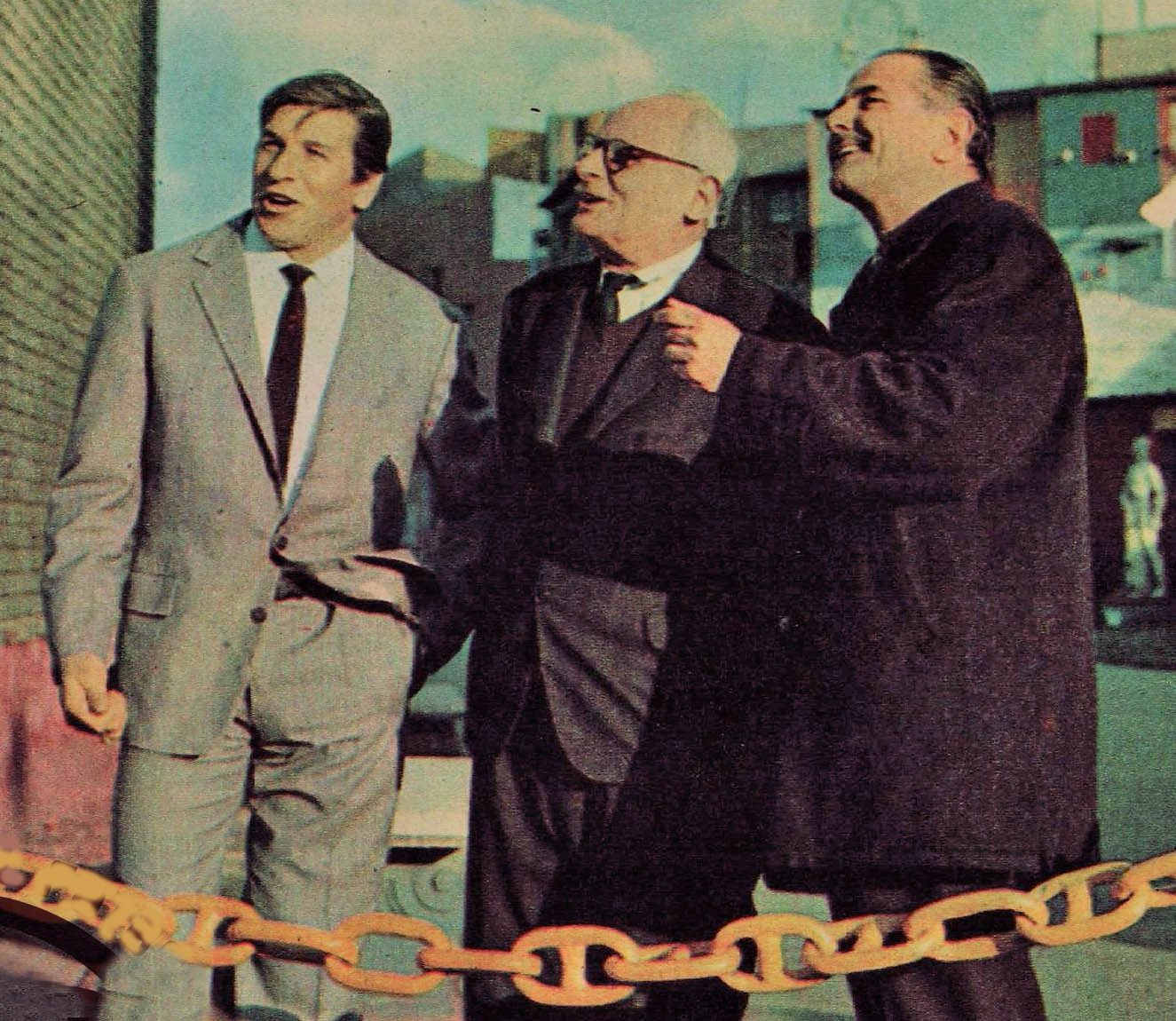
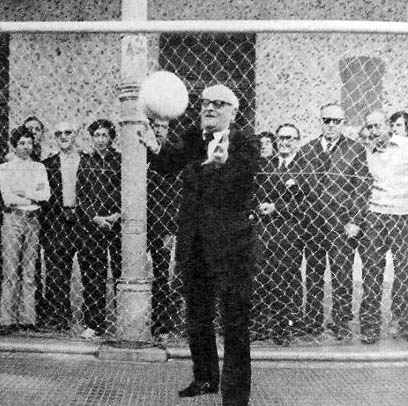
Two moments of an elder Tesoriere, (left): in La Boca with other two legend goalkeepers of Boca Juniors, Antonio Roma (left) and Claudio Vacca, in the 1960s; (right): during a football exhibition in 1974

When I was on the field, I begged the rival did not come to play. I was afraid, terribly afraid.

— Tesoriere confessing his fears before his debut v Estudiantes de Buenos Aires. As the team did not attend to play the match, it was finally suspended

I think the goalkeeper has to play as a third defender. I constantly analysed my abilities, seeking for better techniques. I wished to increase my aculty of vision to overcome my lack of agility.

— Tesoriere about his strengths and weaknesses, 1917

I am saddened because I can't play anymore ... I never attend football matches. But this year I will go. Sometimes on Sundays, when the wind blows to the riverside, it brings the echoes of the crowd at the stadium.

— Tesoriere during an interview with journalist Borocotó in 1932
