= Alfredinho (footballer, born 1927) =

Brazilian footballer and manager

Personal information
- Full name: Alfredo Sampaio Filho
- Date of birth: 7 February 1927
- Place of birth: Cascavel, Brazil
- Date of death: 4 April 2017 (aged 90)
- Place of death: Ribeirão Preto, Brazil
- Position: Winger

Senior career*
Years	Team	Apps	(Gls)
1948–1950	Ceará	31	(44)
1950	Sampaio Corrêa		
1950	Remo		
1951	Madureira		
1952	Palmeiras	0	(0)
1952–1955	Linense		
1955–1959	Santos	121	(32)
1957–1958	→ Grêmio (loan)		
1959	XV de Piracicaba		
1960–1961	Comercial-SP		

Managerial career
- 1961–1963: Santos (assistant)
- 1965–1966: Comercial-SP
- 1967: Guarani
- 1968: Botafogo-SP
- 1968: Paulista
- 1969: Paulista
- 1970: Comercial-SP
- 1970: Marília
- 1971: Marília
- 1972: Botafogo-SP
- 1973: Marília
- 1973–1974: Botafogo-SP
- 1974: Paulista
- 1975: Comercial-SP
- 1976: Santos
- 1977: Comercial-SP
- 1978: Noroeste
- 1979: Inter de Limeira
- 1980: Inter de Limeira
- 1981: Marília
- 1981: Comercial-SP
- 1982: Francana
- 1983: Botafogo-SP
- 1983: Rio Preto
- 1984: Taquaritinga
- 1999: Comercial-SP (interim)
- * Club domestic league appearances and goals

Alfredo Sampaio Filho (7 February 1927 – 4 April 2017), known as Alfredinho, was a Brazilian football player and later manager for nearly four decades, from 1961 to 1999. He played as a right winger.

== Honours ==
=== Player ===
Santos

- Campeonato Paulista: 1955, 1956
- Torneio Rio – São Paulo: 1959

Grêmio

- Campeonato Gaúcho: 1957
