= Modesto Denis =

Paraguayan footballer (1901-1956)

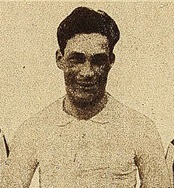

Personal information
- Date of birth: 9 March 1901
- Place of birth: Paraguay
- Date of death: 30 April 1956 (aged 55)
- Position: Goalkeeper

Senior career*
Years	Team	Apps	(Gls)
- Club Nacional

International career
1922–1930	Paraguay	30	(0)
- * Club domestic league appearances and goals

Modesto Denis (9 March 1901 – 30 April 1956) was a Paraguayan football goalkeeper who played for Paraguay in the 1930 FIFA World Cup. He also played for Club Nacional.
