= Alfredinho (footballer, born 1896) =

Brazilian footballer (1896–?)

Personal information
- Full name: Alfredo Silva
- Date of birth: 5 May 1896
- Place of birth: São Paulo, Brazil
- Position: Midfielder

International career
Years	Team	Apps	(Gls)
1921–1922	Brazil	4	(0)

Alfredo Silva (born 5 May 1896, date of death unknown), known as Alfredinho, was a Brazilian footballer who played as a midfielder. He made four appearances for the Brazil national team from 1921 to 1922. He was also part of Brazil's squad for the 1921 South American Championship. He was the Campeonato Carioca top scorer in 1934.
