= Ramón González (Paraguayan footballer) =

Paraguayan footballer

Personal information
- Position: Defender

International career
Years	Team	Apps	(Gls)
1921–1922	Paraguay	4	(0)
Medal record
Representing Paraguay
Men's football
South American Championship
Silver medal – second place	Brazil 1922

Ramón González was a Paraguayan footballer who played as a defender. He represented the Paraguay national football team between 1921 and 1922 and was a member of the Paraguayan squad that finished as runners-up at the 1922 South American Championship.

== International career ==
González represented Paraguay at the 1921 South American Championship, the country's first appearance in the tournament. Paraguay finished fourth in the four-team competition. González played in all three of Paraguay's matches, against Uruguay, Brazil and Argentina.

The following year, González was again selected for Paraguay at the 1922 South American Championship in Brazil. Paraguay enjoyed a much stronger tournament and finished as runners-up to the hosts. González made one appearance, playing in the championship-deciding play-off against Brazil.

In total, González made four appearances for the Paraguay national team between 1921 and 1922, without scoring.

== Bibliography ==
- Tomasz Wołek, Encyklopedia piłkarska FUJI. Copa America, Wydawnictwo GiA, Katowice, 1995, ISBN 83-902751-2-0, p. 22.
