= Candiota (footballer) =

Brazilian footballer (1900–1949)

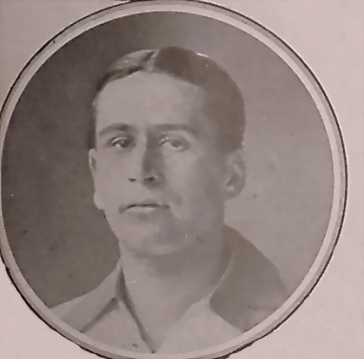

Personal information
- Full name: Aníbal Médicis Candiota
- Date of birth: 14 June 1900
- Place of birth: Bagé, Brazil
- Date of death: 15 October 1949 (aged 49)
- Position: Forward

International career
Years	Team	Apps	(Gls)
1921	Brazil	3	(1)

Aníbal Médicis Candiota (14 June 1900 – 15 October 1949), known as just Candiota, was a Brazilian footballer. He played in three matches for the Brazil national football team in 1921. He was also part of Brazil's squad for the 1921 South American Championship.
