= Machado (footballer) =

Brazilian footballer (born 1900)

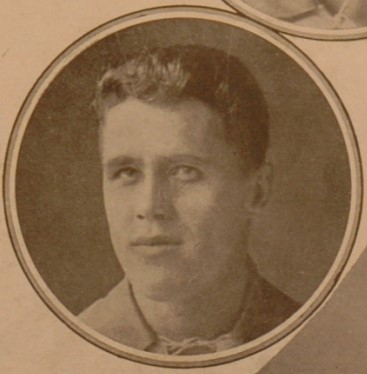
- Machado in 1921

Personal information
- Full name: Ernesto Duarte Machado da Silva
- Date of birth: 30 September 1900

International career
Years	Team	Apps	(Gls)
1921	Brazil	3	(0)

Ernesto Duarte Machado da Silva (born 30 September 1900, date of death unknown), known as just Machado, was a Brazilian footballer. He played in three matches for the Brazil national football team in 1921. He was also part of Brazil's squad for the 1921 South American Championship.
