= Júlio Kuntz =

Brazilian footballer

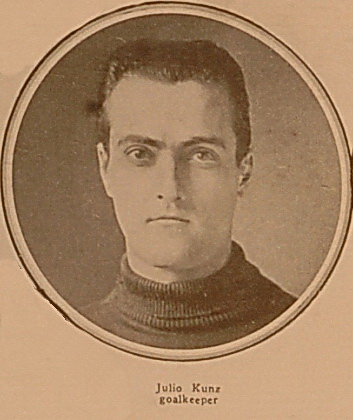

Personal information
- Date of birth: 3 September 1897
- Date of death: 19 August 1938 (aged 40)
- Position: Goalkeeper

International career
Years	Team	Apps	(Gls)
1920–1922	Brazil	10	(0)

Júlio Kuntz (3 September 1897 – 19 August 1938) was a Brazilian footballer. He played in ten matches for the Brazil national football team from 1920 to 1922. He was also part of Brazil's squad for the 1920 South American Championship.
