= Laís (footballer) =

Brazilian footballer (1899–1963)

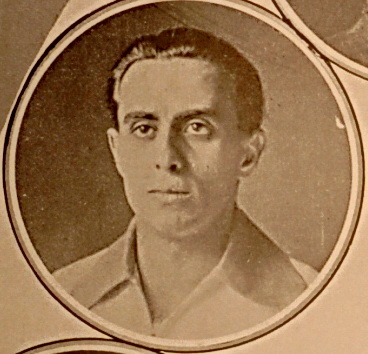

Personal information
- Full name: Arthur Antunes de Moraes e Castro
- Date of birth: 11 November 1899
- Place of birth: Rio de Janeiro, Brazil
- Date of death: 20 December 1963 (aged 64)

International career
Years	Team	Apps	(Gls)
1919–1922	Brazil	9	(0)

Arthur Antunes de Moraes e Castro (11 November 1899 – 20 December 1963), known as Laís, was a Brazilian footballer who played as a midfielder. He played in nine matches for the Brazil national football team from 1919 to 1922. He was also part of Brazil's squad for the 1919 South American Championship.
