= Manuel Fleitas Solich =

Paraguayan footballer and coach (1900-1984)

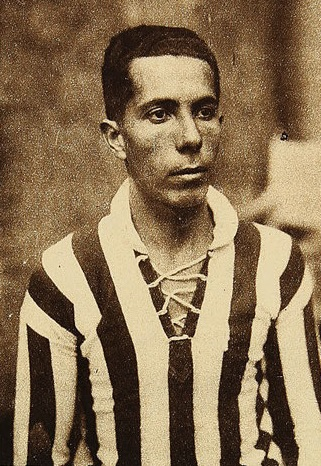

Personal information
- Full name: Manuel Agustín Fleitas Solich
- Date of birth: 30 December 1900
- Place of birth: Asunción, Paraguay
- Date of death: 24 March 1984 (aged 83)
- Place of death: Rio de Janeiro, Brazil
- Position: Midfielder

Senior career*
| Years | Team | Apps | (Gls) |
| 1918–1926 | Club Nacional | | |
| 1927–1931 | Boca Juniors | | |
| 1931 | Racing Club | | |
| 1932–1933 | Platense | | |
| 1933 | Talleres (RE) | | |
| 1933–1936 | Boca Juniors | | |

International career
| 1919–1926 | Paraguay | 32 | (6) |

Managerial career
- 1922–1929: Paraguay
- 1932: Lanús
- 1933: Newell's Old Boys
- 1934–1935: Quilmes
- 1936: Talleres (RE)
- 1937: Lanús
- 1937–1938: Club Nacional
- 1939: Paraguay
- 1940–1941: River Plate
- 1942: Olimpia
- 1942: Paraguay
- 1943–1944: Libertad
- 1944-1945: Newell's Old Boys
- 1945–1946: Paraguay
- 1946: Lanús
- 1947: Quilmes
- 1947–1953: Paraguay
- 1953–1957: Flamengo
- 1958–1959: Flamengo
- 1959–1960: Real Madrid
- 1960–1962: Flamengo
- 1962: Corinthians
- 1962: Fluminense
- 1966: Palmeiras
- 1967–1968: Atlético Mineiro
- 1970–1971: Bahia
- 1971: Flamengo
- * Club domestic league appearances and goals

Manuel Agustín Fleitas Solich (30 December 1900 – 24 March 1984) was a Paraguayan football player and coach. He was known as "El Brujo" (the Wizard).

== Career as a player ==
Fleitas Solich played for Club Nacional of Paraguay where he won two Paraguayan League titles, in 1924 and 1926. He also played for Boca Juniors where as the captain of the team he led them to the 1930 Argentine title. During his time at Boca he played 99 games for the club in all competitions, scoring 15 goals. He suffered an injury in 1930 and never recovered to his full ability.

In Argentina he also played for clubs such as Racing Club, Platense and Talleres (RE).

While playing for the Paraguay national football team, Solich had 32 caps and 6 goals.

== Career as a coach ==
Solich's career as a coach proved to be impressive as he led the Paraguay national team to a final in the 1947 Copa América and won the 1953 tournament (which was the first Copa América ever won by Paraguay). He also coached the Paraguay national team at the 1950 FIFA World Cup. At the club level coached several Brazilian clubs such as Palmeiras, Corinthians, Atlético, Fluminense and Flamengo, being this last club where he won several titles. In Europe, Solich coached Real Madrid for seven months of the 1959–1960 season, where he led the Spanish team to 21 wins, 5 draws and 4 losses. He also coached the Peru national football team, Newell's Old Boys, Quilmes, Club Libertad and his beloved Club Nacional.

== Managerial statistics ==
| Team | Nation | From | To | Record | | | | |
| Team | Nation | From | To | G | W | D | L | Win % |
|---|---|---|---|---|---|---|---|---|
| Paraguay | Paraguay | 1922 | 1929 | 40 | 13 | 6 | 21 | 32.5 |
| Lanús | Argentina | 1932 | 1932 | 37 | 8 | 7 | 22 | 21.62 |
| Quilmes | Argentina | 1934 | 1935 | 64 | 16 | 12 | 36 | 25 |
| Talleres (RE) | Argentina | 1936 | 1936 | 34 | 7 | 5 | 22 | 20.59 |
| Lanús | Argentina | 1937 | 1937 | 34 | 13 | 6 | 15 | 38.24 |
| Paraguay | Paraguay | 1939 | 1939 | 5 | 2 | 0 | 3 | 40 |
| Olimpia | Paraguay | 1942 | 1942 | 18 | 9 | 5 | 4 | 50 |
| Libertad | Paraguay | 1943 | 1944 | 34 | 24 | 6 | 6 | 50 |
| Paraguay | Paraguay | 1945 | 1946 | 9 | 3 | 1 | 5 | 33.33 |
| Lanús | Argentina | 1946 | 1946 | 30 | 8 | 10 | 12 | 26.67 |
| Quilmes | Argentina | 1947 | 1947 | 38 | 23 | 8 | 7 | 60.53 |
| Paraguay | Paraguay | 1947 | 1953 | 28 | 15 | 7 | 6 | 53.57 |
| Flamengo | Brazil | 1953 | 1957 | 276 | 175 | 47 | 54 | 63.41 |
| Flamengo | Brazil | 1958 | 1959 | 90 | 53 | 18 | 19 | 58.89 |
| Real Madrid | Spain | 1959 | 1960 | 30 | 21 | 5 | 4 | 70 |
| Flamengo | Brazil | 1960 | 1962 | 99 | 59 | 18 | 22 | 59.6 |
| Fluminense | Brazil | 1962 | 1962 | 12 | 9 | 0 | 3 | 75 |
| Corinthians | Brazil | 1962 | 1962 | 17 | 9 | 4 | 4 | 52.94 |
| Palmeiras | Brazil | 1966 | 1966 | 31 | 20 | 5 | 6 | 64.52 |
| Atlético Mineiro | Brazil | 1967 | 1968 | 76 | 42 | 19 | 15 | 55.26 |
| Bahia | Brazil | 1970 | 1971 | 32 | 15 | 10 | 7 | 46.88 |
| Flamengo | Brazil | 1971 | 1971 | 39 | 13 | 17 | 9 | 33.33 |
| Total | | | | 1,079 | 559 | 222 | 303 | 51.81 |

As of 22 May 2023

== See also ==
- List of football managers with the most matches
