= 1921 South American Championship =

Football tournament

1921 South American Championship of Nations
Copa América (since 1975)

Tournament details
- Host country: Argentina
- Dates: 2–30 October
- Teams: 4 (from 1 confederation)
- Venue: 1 (in 1 host city)

Final positions
- Champions: Argentina (1st title)
- Runners-up: Brazil
- Third place: Uruguay
- Fourth place: Paraguay

Tournament statistics
- Matches played: 6
- Goals scored: 14 (2.33 per match)
- Top scorer(s): (Argentina) Julio Libonatti (3 goals)

The 1921 South American Championship was the fifth continental championship for nations in South America. It was held in Buenos Aires, Argentina, from 2 to 30 October 1921.

The participating countries were Argentina, Brazil, Paraguay (which debuted in this edition) and Uruguay. Chile was also invited but withdrew before the draw due to internal dissent, and an invitation was sent to Argentine dissident Asociación Amateurs de Football that originated a conflict with the Argentine Football Association (the official local governing body and organiser of the competition).

Argentina won the tournament, being also its first official title, after several friendly competitions won such as Copa Lipton or Copa Newton.

== Squads ==
For a complete list of participating squads see: 1921 South American Championship squads

== Venues ==
Buenos Aires
Sportivo Barracas
Capacity: 30,000
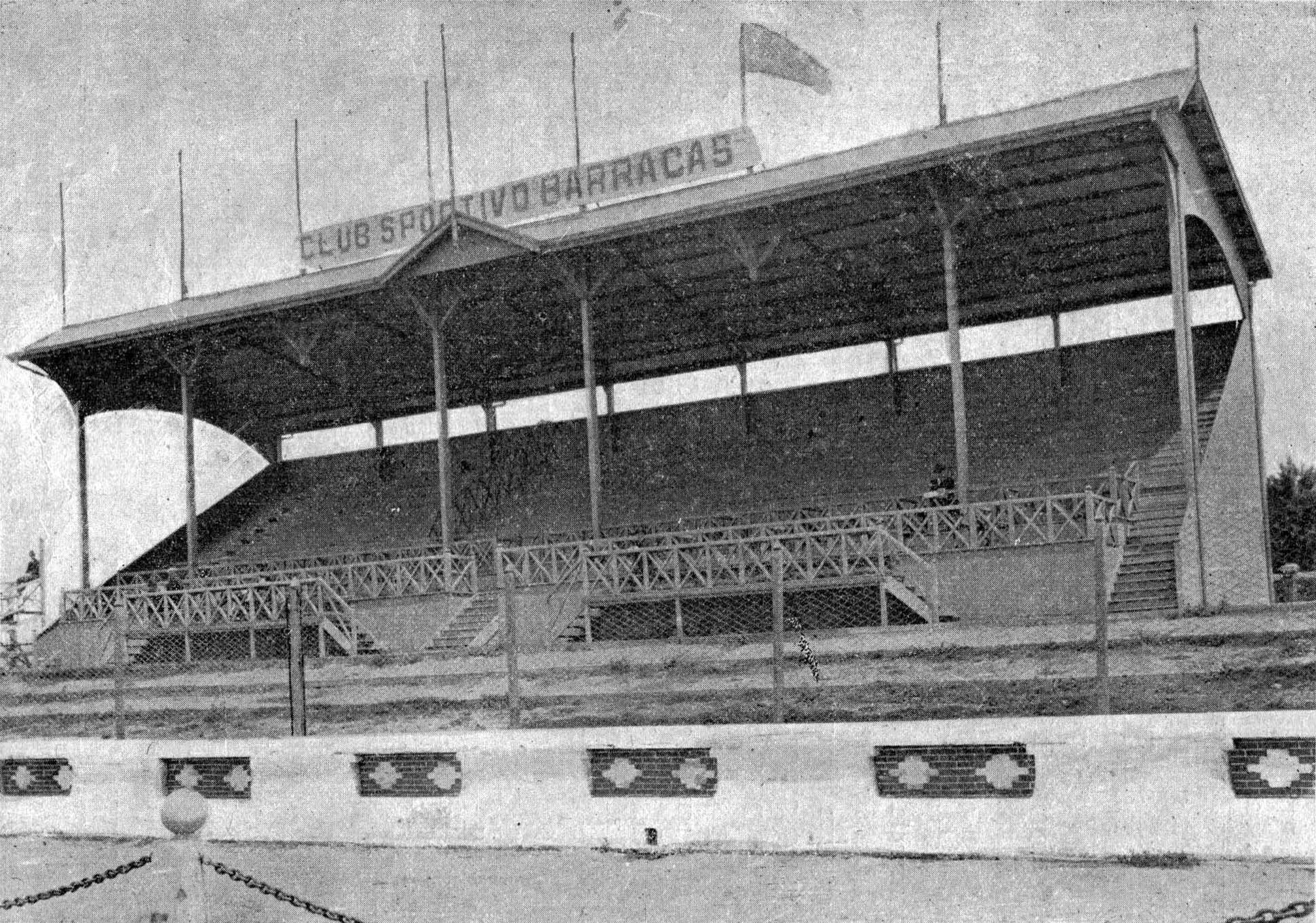

== History ==
=== Background ===
The tournament was marked by the strong dispute between the Argentine Football Association (AFA) and dissident Asociación Amateurs de Football (AAmF, formed one year before). The AAmF had received an invitation from the Football Federation of Chile to play a tournament in that country. Most of the Big Five (with the exception of Boca Juniors) were affiliated to AAmF, which had 20 teams competing in their own championship. After the AAmF accepted the invitation, some of its most prominent players trip to Chile by train. Manuel Seoane, Humberto Recanatini, Luis Célico, Cándido García, Albérico Zabaleta, were among them. The invitation was taken as a pure provocation by the AFA, which requested South American Football Confederation (CSF) the FFCh to be punished.

Being aware that they could receive a punishment, the FFCh retired its team from the competition so Chile did not attended the cup. Brazil did not include Paulista players (only Cariocas) due to a strong conflict, similar to what happened in Argentina. Paraguay arrived in Buenos Aires via Rosario, where the squad played some friendly matches v Newell's Old Boys and Tiro Federal. As a curious fact, it is worth mentioned that the Paraguayan ship also brought Rosarian players Ernesto Celli, Gabino Sosa, and Julio Libonatti (called up for Argentina) to Buenos Aires.

On 29 September, there was a meeting where the Chilean case was debated. Argentine Minister of Foreign Affairs, Honorio Pueyrredón, host the meeting, where the Paraguayan delegate complained about the few time to train before their debut, contrasting with other teams that would play their first matches with more time to rest. That was solved after Argentina and Brazil agreed to open the competition. Following that discussion, the Chilean representative stated that the invitation sent to AAmF had to be seen as "a step forward to the reunification of Argentine football". On the other hand, the Uruguayan representative threatened to suspend the competition in case of Chile was penalised. After the other delegates supported the argument, Argentina was forced to accept those conditions and the competition was held with no punishment for Chile.

The AAmF ignored the competition, with its Primera División championship running at the same time that Campeonato Sudamericano. In fact, the 35th. round was scheduled for 30 October, the same day as the final match where Argentina crowned champion.

=== Tournament ===
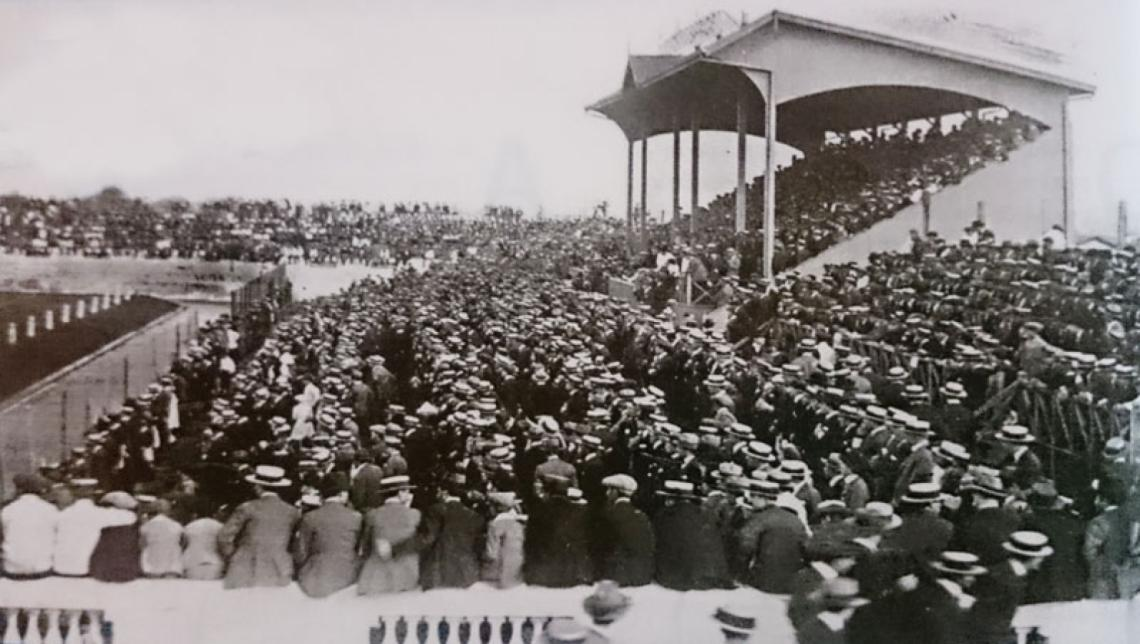
The tournament was a success, with high attendance to the matches, as shown in this photo

The inaugural match between Argentina and Brazil was attended by 30,000 spectators (although the maximum capacity of Estadio Sportivo Barracas was 22,000) due to reselling ticket for twice or more its original value. Brazil came into the field with no black players because they had been banned after a suggestion from the President of Brazil, Epitácio Pessoa. Therefore Arthur Friedenreich, considered the first star of Brazilian football, was not part of that team. Argentina won 1–0 with a goal scored by Julio Libonatti.

There was great expectations for the final match between Argentina and Uruguay. Sebastián García, president of Liga Rosarina de Football, made the arrangements for people to attend the match travelling from Rosario to Buenos Aires, with tickets at low prices. Near 3,000 people from Rosario travelled to support fellow citizens Julio Libonatti, Blas Saruppo, Adolfo Celli and Florindo Bearzotti. The train departed at 6 a.m., returning to Rosario at 6 p.m.

To take pressure off the players, Argentine executives carried them to a training camp in Tigre, Buenos Aires Province. Bocce, fishing and music were some of the activities during their time there.

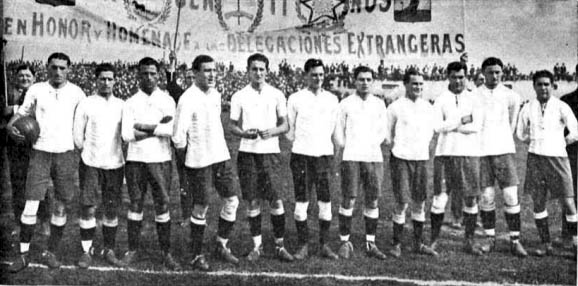
The Argentina team that beat Uruguay in the last game

The Friday before the final, while the Uruguayan players played basketball in their camp in Vicente López, the Argentine executives moved the players from Tigre to a hotel in Buenos Aires downtown, where they were strictly controlled. No one could escape from there, although the duo Carlos Gardel–José Razzano were performing at Teatro Esmeralda, not far from the hotel.

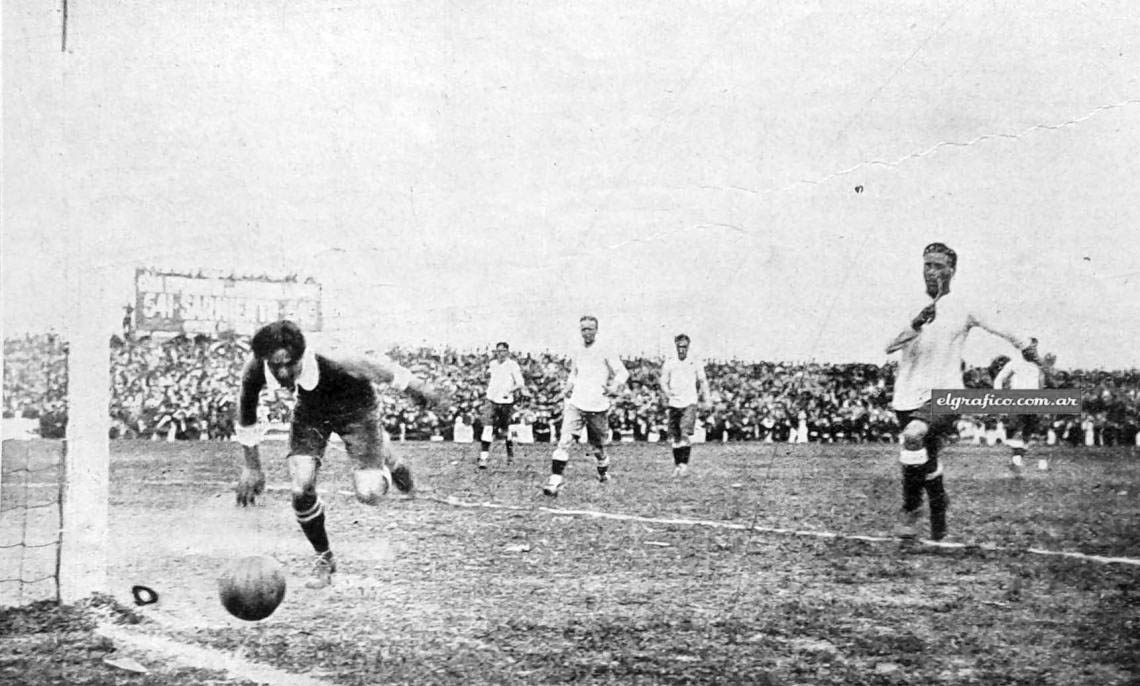
A moment of the Argentina v Uruguay match

The championship received wide media coverage, especially from Crítica, a newspaper founded and directed by Natalio Botana which increased its sales to become the most selling newspaper in Argentina. Botana would be then preside the AFA for a brief period in 1926. The newspaper took on a critical position regarding the AAmF and its leaders, sometimes in very harsh terms, even calling them "cretins".

The final was attended by near 40,000 people, who were at the stadium three hours prior to the start. Argentina beat Uruguay 1–0 in the last match and won the competition after earning the most points (6 in 3 games). When the match ended, the players of both teams were raised by the crowd that had entered to the pitch and carried them to the hotel where the Argentine stayed during the competition, sited on the corner of Florida and Cangallo streets.

Argentina won all the games without conceding any goal, helped by the good performance of goalkeeper Américo Tesoriere, one of the most notable footballers of the team along with Julio Libonatti, who scored three goals (one per match).

== Aftermath ==
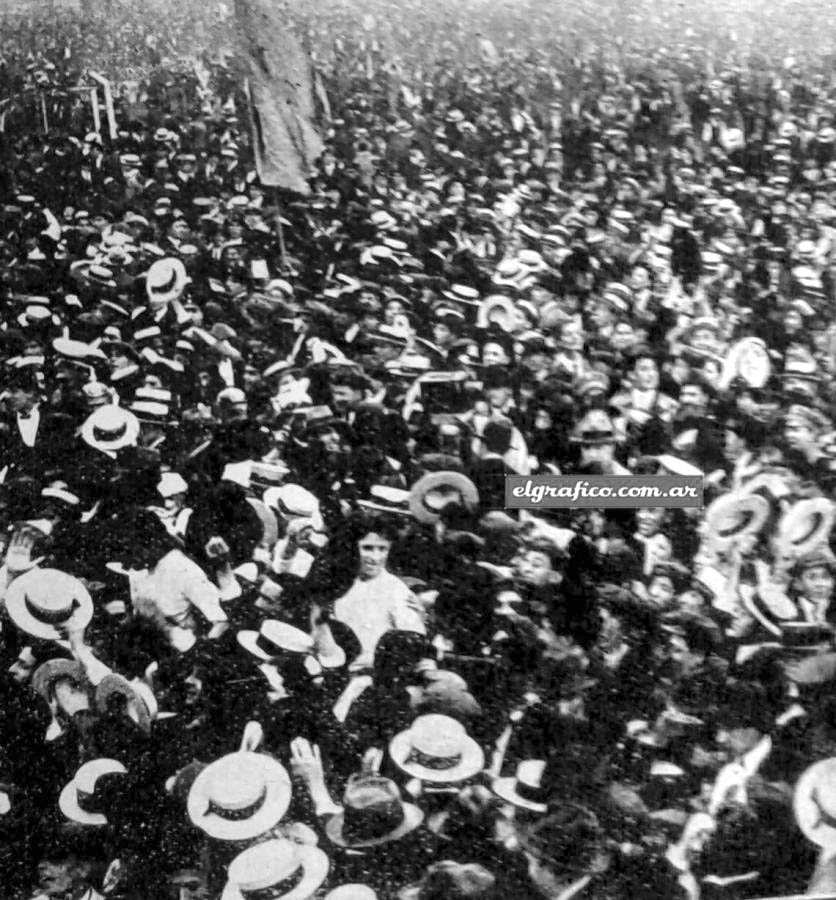
The crowd raising the Argentine and Uruguayan players after the final match. The championship was a sporting and commercial success, consolidating the huge popularity of football in Argentina

The large number of people who attended the matches at Sportivo Barracas and the celebrations after the victory consolidated football as a popular passion throughout the country.

The South American championship was also a commercial success, with $147,033 income from ticket sales and a $15,000 donation from the Buenos Aires City Council against total expenses of $113,801; this gave a profit of $48,232, a substantial sum at a time when football was still amateur in Argentina.

== Final round ==
Team	Pld	W	D	L	GF	GA	GD	Pts
Argentina	3	3	0	0	5	0	+5	6
Brazil	3	1	0	2	4	3	+1	2
Uruguay	3	1	0	2	3	4	−1	2
Paraguay	3	1	0	2	2	7	−5	2

2 October 1921

Argentina	1–0	Brazil
Libonatti 27'

Sportivo Barracas, Buenos Aires
Attendance: 30,000
Referee: Ricardo Vallarino (Uruguay)

9 October 1921

Paraguay	2–1	Uruguay
Rivas 9'; López 66'		Piendibene 83'

Sportivo Barracas, Buenos Aires
Referee: Gerónimo Rapossi (Argentina)

12 October 1921

Paraguay	0–3	Brazil
		Machado 21', 44'; Candiota 46'

Sportivo Barracas, Buenos Aires
Referee: Ricardo Vallarino (Uruguay)

16 October 1921

Argentina	3–0	Paraguay
Libonatti 1'; Saruppo 71'; Echeverría 76'

Sportivo Barracas, Buenos Aires
Referee: Ricardo Vallarino (Uruguay)

23 October 1921

Uruguay	2–1	Brazil
Romano 1', 8'		Zezé I 53'

Sportivo Barracas, Buenos Aires
Referee: Víctor Cabañas Saguier (Paraguay)

30 October 1921

Argentina	1–0	Uruguay
Libonatti 57'

Sportivo Barracas, Buenos Aires
Attendance: 40,000
Referee: Pedro Santos (Brazil)

Argentina: Tesoriere; Celli, Bearzotti; J. López, Dellavalle, E. Solari; Calomino, Libonatti, Saruppo, Echeverría, González

== Result ==
1921 South American
Championship champions

Argentina
First title

== Goal scorers ==
3 goals

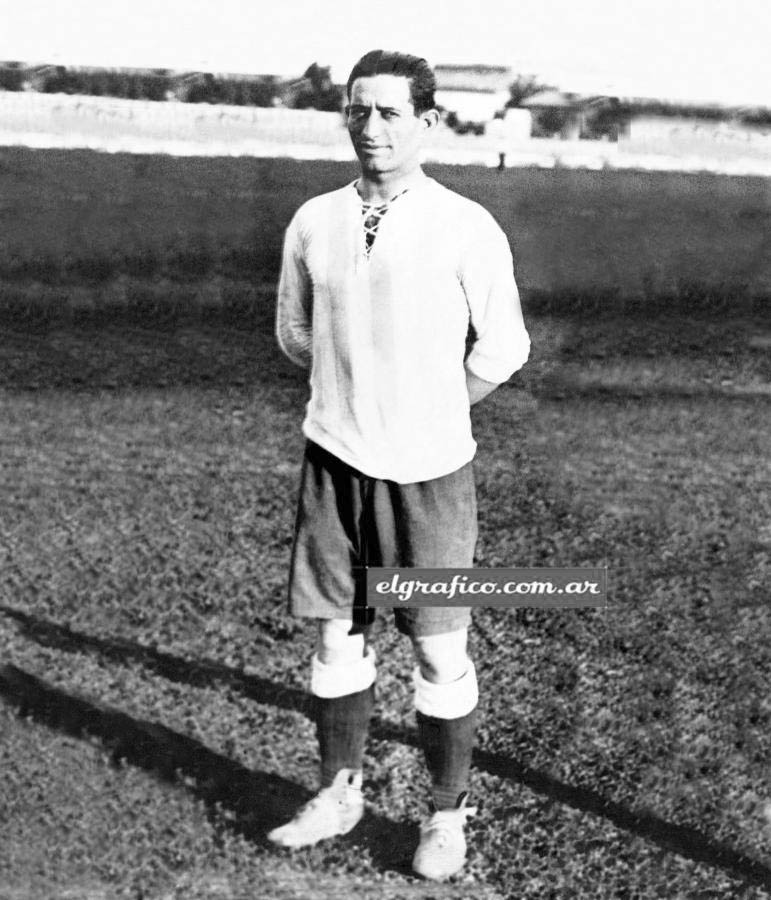
Julio Libonatti, top scorer

- (Argentina) Julio Libonatti

2 goals

- (Brazil) Machado
- (Uruguay) Ángel Romano

1 goal

- (Argentina) Raúl Echeverría
- (Argentina) Blas Saruppo
- (Brazil) Candiota
- (Brazil) Zezé
- (Paraguay) Ildefonso López
- (Paraguay) Gerardo Rivas
- (Uruguay) José Piendibene
